= 1998–99 Pittsburgh Penguins season =

NHL team season

1998–99 Pittsburgh Penguins
- Division: 3rd Atlantic
- Conference: 8th Eastern
- 1998–99 record: 38–30–14
- Home record: 21–10–10
- Road record: 17–20–4
- Goals for: 242
- Goals against: 225

Team information
- General manager: Craig Patrick
- Coach: Kevin Constantine
- Captain: Jaromir Jagr
- Alternate captains: Alexei Kovalev; Martin Straka
- Arena: Civic Arena
- Average attendance: 14,824
- Minor league affiliates: Syracuse Crunch; Wheeling Nailers

Team leaders
- Goals: Jaromir Jagr (44)
- Assists: Jaromir Jagr (83)
- Points: Jaromir Jagr (127)
- Penalty minutes: Brad Werenka (93)
- Plus/minus: German Titov (+18)
- Wins: Tom Barrasso (19)
- Goals against average: Jean-Sebastien Aubin (2.22)

The 1998–99 Pittsburgh Penguins season was the Penguins' 32nd season in the National Hockey League (NHL).

== Regular season ==
The Penguins were the least penalized team during the regular season, with just 302 power-play opportunities against. They also allowed the most short-handed goals, with 14.

=== Final standings ===
Atlantic Division
R	CR		GP	W	L	T	GF	GA	Pts
1	1	**New Jersey Devils**	82	47	24	11	248	196	105
2	5	**Philadelphia Flyers**	82	37	26	19	231	196	93
3	8	**Pittsburgh Penguins**	82	38	30	14	242	225	90
4	10	New York Rangers	82	33	38	11	217	227	77
5	13	New York Islanders	82	24	48	10	194	244	58

Eastern Conference
R		Div	GP	W	L	T	GF	GA	Pts
**1**	**y – New Jersey Devils**	**ATL**	**82**	**47**	**24**	**11**	**248**	**196**	**105**
**2**	**y – Ottawa Senators**	**NE**	**82**	**44**	**23**	**15**	**239**	**179**	**103**
**3**	**y – Carolina Hurricanes**	**SE**	**82**	**34**	**30**	**18**	**210**	**202**	**86**
**4**	**Toronto Maple Leafs**	**NE**	**82**	**45**	**30**	**7**	**268**	**231**	**97**
**5**	**Philadelphia Flyers**	**ATL**	**82**	**37**	**26**	**19**	**231**	**196**	**93**
**6**	**Boston Bruins**	**NE**	**82**	**39**	**30**	**13**	**214**	**181**	**91**
**7**	**Buffalo Sabres**	**NE**	**82**	**37**	**28**	**17**	**207**	**175**	**91**
**8**	**Pittsburgh Penguins**	**ATL**	**82**	**38**	**30**	**14**	**242**	**225**	**90**
9	Florida Panthers	SE	82	30	34	18	210	228	78
10	New York Rangers	ATL	82	33	38	11	217	227	77
11	Montreal Canadiens	NE	82	32	39	11	184	209	75
12	Washington Capitals	SE	82	31	45	6	200	218	68
13	New York Islanders	ATL	82	24	48	10	194	244	58
14	Tampa Bay Lightning	SE	82	19	54	9	179	292	47

Divisions: ATL – Atlantic Division, NE – Northeast Division, SE – Southeast Division

bold – Qualified for playoffs; y – Won division

== Schedule and results ==
=== Regular season ===
1998–99 regular season
October: 4–3–2 (home: 0–1–1; road: 4–2–1), 10 points

#	Date	Visitor	Score	Home	Record	Points	Recap
1	October 10	Pittsburgh Penguins	4–3	New York Islanders	1–0–0	2	W
2	October 14	Pittsburgh Penguins	3–1	New Jersey Devils	2–0–0	4	W
3	October 17	New York Rangers	3–3	Pittsburgh Penguins	2–0–1	5	T
4	October 21	Pittsburgh Penguins	0–5	Tampa Bay Lightning	2–1–1	5	L
5	October 24	Toronto Maple Leafs	6–6	Pittsburgh Penguins	2–2–1	5	L
6	October 26	Pittsburgh Penguins	2–0	Toronto Maple Leafs	3–2–1	7	W
7	October 28	Pittsburgh Penguins	5–2	Calgary Flames	4–2–1	9	W
8	October 30	Pittsburgh Penguins	2–2	Vancouver Canucks	4–2–2	10	T
9	October 31	Pittsburgh Penguins	1–4	Edmonton Oilers	4–3–2	10	L

November: 6–3–3 (home: 3–1–3; road: 3–2–0), 15 points

#	Date	Visitor	Score	Home	Record	Points	Recap
10	November 3	Philadelphia Flyers	4–4	Pittsburgh Penguins	4–3–3	11	T
11	November 5	Pittsburgh Penguins	4–2	Ottawa Senators	5–3–3	13	W
12	November 7	Boston Bruins	0–0	Pittsburgh Penguins	5–3–4	14	T
13	November 10	New York Islanders	2–2	Pittsburgh Penguins	6–3–4	16	W
14	November 13	Pittsburgh Penguins	3–4	New Jersey Devils	6–4–4	16	L
15	November 14	Florida Panthers	0–0	Pittsburgh Penguins	7–4–4	18	W
16	November 17	Philadelphia Flyers	4–4	Pittsburgh Penguins	7–5–4	18	L
17	November 19	Pittsburgh Penguins	5–1	Tampa Bay Lightning	8–5–4	20	W
18	November 21	Tampa Bay Lightning	2–2	Pittsburgh Penguins	9–5–4	22	W
19	November 25	Pittsburgh Penguins	4–5	Washington Capitals	9–6–4	22	L
20	November 27	New York Rangers	2–2	Pittsburgh Penguins	9–6–5	23	T
21	November 28	Pittsburgh Penguins	4–3	Montreal Canadiens	10–6–5	25	W

December: 5–4–2 (home: 4–1–1; road: 1–3–1), 12 points

#	Date	Visitor	Score	Home	Record	Points	Recap
22	December 1	Mighty Ducks of Anaheim	4–4	Pittsburgh Penguins	10–6–6	26	T
23	December 4	Pittsburgh Penguins	3–3	Carolina Hurricanes	10–6–7	27	T
24	December 5	Pittsburgh Penguins	1–2	Boston Bruins	10–7–7	27	L
25	December 12	Pittsburgh Penguins	4–3	St. Louis Blues	11–7–7	29	W
26	December 15	Tampa Bay Lightning	2–3 OT	Pittsburgh Penguins	12–7–7	31	W
27	December 16	Pittsburgh Penguins	1–4	Florida Panthers	12–8–7	31	L
28	December 19	Washington Capitals	0–0	Pittsburgh Penguins	13–8–7	33	W
29	December 21	Pittsburgh Penguins	1–7	Toronto Maple Leafs	13–9–7	33	L
30	December 22	Los Angeles Kings	3–3	Pittsburgh Penguins	13–10–7	33	L
31	December 26	Ottawa Senators	1–2 OT	Pittsburgh Penguins	14–10–7	35	W
32	December 30	Florida Panthers	4–4	Pittsburgh Penguins	15–10–7	37	W

January: 8–5–0 (home: 5–2–0; road: 3–3–0), 16 points

#	Date	Visitor	Score	Home	Record	Points	Recap
33	January 2	Pittsburgh Penguins	4–2	Florida Panthers	16–10–7	39	W
34	January 5	Calgary Flames	1–1	Pittsburgh Penguins	17–10–7	41	W
35	January 7	Carolina Hurricanes	2–2	Pittsburgh Penguins	18–10–7	43	W
36	January 9	St. Louis Blues	1–1	Pittsburgh Penguins	19–10–7	45	W
37	January 13	Pittsburgh Penguins	3–5	Phoenix Coyotes	19–11–7	45	L
38	January 15	Pittsburgh Penguins	2–3	San Jose Sharks	19–12–7	45	L
39	January 16	Pittsburgh Penguins	5–1	Los Angeles Kings	20–12–7	47	W
40	January 18	Pittsburgh Penguins	3–5	Mighty Ducks of Anaheim	20–13–7	47	L
41	January 21	New York Islanders	5–5	Pittsburgh Penguins	20–14–7	47	L
42	January 26	Carolina Hurricanes	5–5	Pittsburgh Penguins	20–15–7	47	L
43	January 28	Toronto Maple Leafs	0–0	Pittsburgh Penguins	21–15–7	49	W
44	January 30	Boston Bruins	2–2	Pittsburgh Penguins	22–15–7	51	W
45	January 31	Pittsburgh Penguins	5–3	Montreal Canadiens	23–15–7	53	W

February: 9–5–0 (home: 7–0–0; road: 2–5–0), 18 points

#	Date	Visitor	Score	Home	Record	Points	Recap
46	February 2	Buffalo Sabres	3–5	Pittsburgh Penguins	24–15–7	55	W
47	February 5	Florida Panthers	0–0	Pittsburgh Penguins	25–15–7	57	W
48	February 7	Detroit Red Wings	1–1	Pittsburgh Penguins	26–15–7	59	W
49	February 9	Montreal Canadiens	2–3 OT	Pittsburgh Penguins	27–15–7	61	W
50	February 11	Vancouver Canucks	5–6 OT	Pittsburgh Penguins	28–15–7	63	W
51	February 13	Pittsburgh Penguins	3–2 OT	Nashville Predators	29–15–7	65	W
52	February 15	Washington Capitals	3–3	Pittsburgh Penguins	30–15–7	67	W
53	February 17	Pittsburgh Penguins	1–3	New York Islanders	30–16–7	67	L
54	February 19	Pittsburgh Penguins	1–6	New York Rangers	30–17–7	67	L
55	February 21	Pittsburgh Penguins	1–2	Philadelphia Flyers	30–18–7	67	L
56	February 22	Phoenix Coyotes	1–1	Pittsburgh Penguins	31–18–7	69	W
57	February 25	Pittsburgh Penguins	3–2	Colorado Avalanche	32–18–7	71	W
58	February 26	Pittsburgh Penguins	4–6	Dallas Stars	32–19–7	71	L
59	February 28	Pittsburgh Penguins	3–4	Washington Capitals	32–20–7	71	L

March: 4–5–6 (home: 2–3–5; road: 2–2–1), 14 points

#	Date	Visitor	Score	Home	Record	Points	Recap
60	March 3	Montreal Canadiens	4–4	Pittsburgh Penguins	32–20–8	72	T
61	March 5	Edmonton Oilers	2–2	Pittsburgh Penguins	32–20–9	73	T
62	March 7	Colorado Avalanche	3–1	Pittsburgh Penguins	32–21–9	73	L
63	March 9	New Jersey Devils	3–2	Pittsburgh Penguins	32–22–9	73	L
64	March 10	Pittsburgh Penguins	3–2 OT	Carolina Hurricanes	33–22–9	75	W
65	March 13	Philadelphia Flyers	0–4	Pittsburgh Penguins	34–22–9	77	W
66	March 16	Dallas Stars	2–2	Pittsburgh Penguins	34–22–10	78	T
67	March 17	Pittsburgh Penguins	2–0	Tampa Bay Lightning	35–22–10	80	W
68	March 20	Nashville Predators	1–1	Pittsburgh Penguins	35–22–11	81	T
69	March 21	Pittsburgh Penguins	2–2	New York Rangers	35–22–12	82	T
70	March 23	Chicago Blackhawks	2–2	Pittsburgh Penguins	36–22–12	84	W
71	March 25	Pittsburgh Penguins	3–5	New Jersey Devils	36–23–12	84	L
72	March 27	Buffalo Sabres	1–1	Pittsburgh Penguins	36–23–13	85	T
73	March 28	Pittsburgh Penguins	3–4 OT	Buffalo Sabres	36–24–13	85	L
74	March 30	Ottawa Senators	6–6	Pittsburgh Penguins	36–25–13	85	L

April: 2–5–1 (home: 0–2–0; road: 2–3–1), 5 points

#	Date	Visitor	Score	Home	Record	Points	Recap
75	April 1	Pittsburgh Penguins	3–3	Ottawa Senators	36–25–14	86	T
76	April 3	New Jersey Devils	4–4	Pittsburgh Penguins	36–26–14	86	L
77	April 5	Pittsburgh Penguins	1–3	Buffalo Sabres	36–27–14	86	L
78	April 8	Pittsburgh Penguins	1–3	Philadelphia Flyers	36–28–14	86	L
79	April 11	Pittsburgh Penguins	3–0	Detroit Red Wings	37–28–14	88	W
80	April 15	Pittsburgh Penguins	2–4	Boston Bruins	37–29–14	88	L
81	April 17	New York Islanders	7–7	Pittsburgh Penguins	37–30–14	88	L
82	April 18	Pittsburgh Penguins	2–1 OT	New York Rangers	38–30–14	90	W

Legend: W Win (2 points) L Loss (0 points) T Tie (1 point)

=== Playoffs ===
1999 Stanley Cup playoffs
Eastern Conference Quarterfinals vs. (1) New Jersey Devils – Penguins win 4–3

Game	Date	Visitor	Score	Home	Series	Recap
1	April 22	Pittsburgh Penguins	1–3	New Jersey Devils	0–1	L
2	April 24	Pittsburgh Penguins	4–1	New Jersey Devils	1–1	W
3	April 25	New Jersey Devils	2–4	Pittsburgh Penguins	2–1	W
4	April 27	New Jersey Devils	4–2	Pittsburgh Penguins	2–2	L
5	April 30	Pittsburgh Penguins	3–4	New Jersey Devils	2–3	L
6	May 2	New Jersey Devils	2–3 OT	Pittsburgh Penguins	3–3	W
7	May 4	Pittsburgh Penguins	4–2	New Jersey Devils	4–3	W

Eastern Conference Semifinals vs. (4) Toronto Maple Leafs – Maple Leafs win 4–2

Game	Date	Visitor	Score	Home	Series	Recap
1	May 7	Pittsburgh Penguins	2–0	Toronto Maple Leafs	1–0	W
2	May 9	Pittsburgh Penguins	2–4	Toronto Maple Leafs	1–1	L
3	May 11	Toronto Maple Leafs	3–4	Pittsburgh Penguins	2–1	W
4	May 13	Toronto Maple Leafs	3–2 OT	Pittsburgh Penguins	2–2	L
5	May 15	Pittsburgh Penguins	1–4	Toronto Maple Leafs	2–3	L
6	May 17	Toronto Maple Leafs	4–3 OT	Pittsburgh Penguins	2–4	L

Legend: W Win L Loss

== Player statistics ==
Skaters

Regular season
Player	GP	G	A	Pts	+/−	PIM
Jaromir Jagr	81	44	83	127	17	66
Martin Straka	80	35	48	83	12	26
German Titov	72	11	45	56	18	34
Alex Kovalev^{†}	63	20	26	46	8	37
Robert Lang	72	21	23	44	-10	24
Kip Miller	77	19	23	42	1	22
Jan Hrdina	82	13	29	42	-2	40
Kevin Hatcher	66	11	27	38	11	24
Stu Barnes^{‡}	64	20	12	32	-12	20
Rob Brown	58	13	11	24	-15	16
Brad Werenka	81	6	18	24	17	93
Jiri Slegr	63	3	20	23	13	86
Aleksey Morozov	67	9	10	19	5	14
Bobby Dollas	70	2	8	10	-3	60
Dan Kesa	67	2	8	10	-9	27
Ian Moran	62	4	5	9	1	37
Maxim Galanov	51	4	3	7	-8	14
Jeff Serowik	26	0	6	6	-4	16
Darius Kasparaitis	48	1	4	5	12	70
Matthew Barnaby^{†}	18	2	2	4	-10	34
Martin Sonnenberg	44	1	1	2	-2	19
Patrick Lebeau	8	1	0	1	-2	2
Greg Andrusak	7	0	1	1	4	4
Victor Ignatjev	11	0	1	1	-3	6
Neil Wilkinson	24	0	0	0	-2	22
Chris Tamer	11	0	0	0	-2	32
Tyler Wright	61	0	0	0	-2	90
Sean Pronger	2	0	0	0	0	0
Brian Bonin	5	0	0	0	-2	0
Sven Butenschon	17	0	0	0	-7	6
Ryan Savoia	3	0	0	0	-1	0
Harry York	2	0	0	0	0	0
Pavel Skrbek	4	0	0	0	2	2
Total		242	414	656	—	943

Playoffs
Player	GP	G	A	Pts	+/−	PIM
Martin Straka	13	6	9	15	0	6
Jaromir Jagr	9	5	7	12	1	16
Alex Kovalev	10	5	7	12	0	14
Kip Miller	13	2	7	9	-1	19
German Titov	11	3	5	8	4	4
Rob Brown	13	2	5	7	-2	8
Jan Hrdina	13	4	1	5	-1	12
Kevin Hatcher	13	2	3	5	1	4
Jiri Slegr	13	1	3	4	1	12
Brad Werenka	13	1	1	2	0	6
Aleksey Morozov	10	1	1	2	1	0
Robert Lang	12	0	2	2	-3	0
Ian Moran	13	0	2	2	-3	8
Bobby Dollas	13	1	0	1	-4	6
Greg Andrusak	12	1	0	1	-1	6
Dan Kesa	13	1	0	1	-2	0
Todd Hlushko	2	0	0	0	0	0
Tyler Wright	13	0	0	0	-2	19
Matthew Barnaby	13	0	0	0	-2	35
Brian Bonin	3	0	0	0	-1	0
Victor Ignatjev	1	0	0	0	0	2
Maxim Galanov	1	0	0	0	0	0
Martin Sonnenberg	7	0	0	0	-2	0
Total		35	53	88	—	177

Goaltenders

Regular season
Player	GP	GS	TOI	W	L	T	GA	GAA	SA	SV%	SO	G	A	PIM
Tom Barrasso	43	43	2306:15	19	16	3	98	2.55	993	0.901	4	0	3	20
Peter Skudra	37	28	1914:12	15	11	5	89	2.79	822	0.892	3	0	0	2
Jean-Sebastien Aubin	17	11	756:15	4	3	6	28	2.22	304	0.908	2	0	0	0
Total		82	4976:42	38	30	14	215	2.59	2119	0.899	9	0	3	22

Playoffs
Player	GP	GS	TOI	W	L	T	GA	GAA	SA	SV%	SO	G	A	PIM
Tom Barrasso	13	13	787:20	6	7	0	35	2.67	350	0.900	1	0	0	4
Total		13	787:20	6	7	0	35	2.67	350	0.900	1	0	0	4

^{†}Denotes player spent time with another team before joining the Penguins. Stats reflect time with the Penguins only.
^{‡}Denotes player was traded mid-season. Stats reflect time with the Penguins only.

== Awards and records ==
=== Awards ===
Type	Award/honor	Recipient	Ref
League (annual)	Art Ross Trophy	Jaromir Jagr	
League (annual)	Hart Memorial Trophy	Jaromir Jagr	
League (annual)	Lester B. Pearson Award	Jaromir Jagr	
League (annual)	NHL First All-Star Team	Jaromir Jagr (Right wing)	
League (in-season)	NHL All-Star Game selection	Jaromir Jagr (Note: Jagr was voted to the starting lineup.)	
League (in-season)	NHL All-Star Game selection	Martin Straka	
League (in-season)	NHL Player of the Month	Jaromir Jagr (March)	
League (in-season)	NHL Player of the Week	Jaromir Jagr (February 1)	
League (in-season)	NHL Rookie of the Month	Jan Hrdina (January)	
Team	A. T. Caggiano Memorial Booster Club Award	Jaromir Jagr	
Team	Aldege "Baz" Bastien Memorial Good Guy Award	Jiri Slegr	
Team	Bob Johnson Memorial Badger Bob Award	Martin Straka	
Team	Leading Scorer Award	Jaromir Jagr	
Team	Michel Briere Memorial Rookie of the Year Trophy	Jan Hrdina	
Team	Most Valuable Player Award	Jaromir Jagr	
Team	Players' Player Award	Jaromir Jagr	
Team	Players' Player Award	Martin Straka	
Team	The Edward J. DeBartolo Community Service Award	Rob Brown	
Team	The Edward J. DeBartolo Community Service Award	Tyler Wright	

=== Milestones ===
Milestone	Player	Date	Ref
First game	Jan Hrdina	October 10, 1998	
First game	Viktors Ignatjevs	October 10, 1998	
First game	Jean-Sebastien Aubin	October 21, 1998	
First game	Martin Sonnenberg	November 21, 1998	
First game	Ryan Savoia	March 27, 1999	
First game	Pavel Skrbek	March 28, 1999	
First game	Brian Bonin	April 8, 1999	
1,000th game played	Kevin Hatcher	January 18, 1999	

== Transactions ==
The Penguins have been involved in the following transactions during the 1998–99 season:

=== Trades ===
November 25, 1998	To New York Rangers Petr Nedved; Sean Pronger; Chris Tamer	To Pittsburgh Penguins Alexei Kovalev; Harry York future considerations
February 10, 1999	To Philadelphia Flyers Sean O`Brien	To Pittsburgh Penguins future considerations
March 11, 1999	To Buffalo Sabres Stu Barnes	To Pittsburgh Penguins Matthew Barnaby
March 18, 1999	To Tampa Bay Lightning future considerations (cash)	To Pittsburgh Penguins Brent Peterson

=== Free agents acquired ===
Player	Former team	Date
Dan Kesa	Hartford Whalers	August 20, 1998

=== Free agents lost ===
Player	New team	Date
Ron Francis	Carolina Hurricanes	July 13, 1998
Stefan Bergkvist	Leksands IF (Sweden)	July 14, 1998
Domenic Pittis	Buffalo Sabres	August 10, 1998
Chris Ferraro	Edmonton Oilers	August 13, 1998
Ed Olczyk	Chicago Blackhawks	August 26, 1998
Joe Dziedzic	Phoenix Coyotes	August 27, 1998
Fredrik Olausson	Mighty Ducks of Anaheim	August 28, 1998
Andreas Johansson	Ottawa Senators	September 29, 1998
Maxim Galanov	Atlanta Thrashers (Expansion Draft)	June 25, 1999

=== Claimed via waivers ===
Date	Player	Previous team
October 5, 1998	Kip Miller	New York Islanders
October 5, 1998	Maxim Galanov	New York Rangers

=== Lost via waivers ===
Date	Player	New team
December 8, 1998	Harry York	Vancouver Canucks

=== Player signings ===
Player	Date
Sean Pronger	August 10, 1998
Rob Brown	August 11, 1998
Sean O'Brien	August 11, 1998
Viktors Ignatjevs	August 11, 1998
Robert Lang	September 22, 1998
Martin Sonnenberg	October 9, 1998
Brian Leitza	October 12, 1998
Patrick Lebeau	October 18, 1998
Greg Andrusak	March 19, 1999
Hans Jonsson	June 21, 1999

== Draft picks ==
Pittsburgh Penguins' picks at the 1998 NHL entry draft.

Round	#	Player	Pos	Nationality	College/Junior/Club team (League)
1	23	Milan Kraft	Center	Czech Republic	Keramika Plzeň (Czech)
2	54	Alexander Zevakhin	Right wing	Russia	CSKA Moscow (RSL)
3	80^{[a]}	David Cameron	Center	Canada	Prince Albert Raiders (WHL)
4	110	Scott Myers	Goaltender	Canada	Prince George Cougars (WHL)
5	134^{[b]}	Rob Scuderi	Defense	United States	Boston College (Hockey East)
6	169	Jan Fadrny	Center	Czech Republic	Slavia Praha (Czech)
7	196	Joel Scherban	Center	Canada	London Knights (OHL)
8	224	Mika Lehto	Goaltender	Finland	Assat (SM-liiga)
9	244^{[c]}	Toby Petersen	Center	United States	Colorado College (WCHA)
9	254	Matt Hussey	Center	United States	Avon Old Farms (USHS-CN)

Draft notes

- ^{a} The Colorado Avalanche's third-round pick went to the Pittsburgh Penguins as a result of a September 28, 1997, trade that sent Francois Leroux to the Avalanche in exchange for this pick.
- The Pittsburgh Penguins' third-round pick went to the Edmonton Oilers as the result of an August 12, 1997, trade that sent Jiri Slegr to the Penguins in exchange for this pick.
- ^{b} The Buffalo Sabres' fifth-round pick went to the Pittsburgh Penguins as a result of a September 24, 1997, trade that sent Jason Woolley to the Sabres in exchange for this pick.
- The Pittsburgh Penguins' fifth-round pick went to the Vancouver Canucks as the result of a March 18, 1997, trade that sent Josef Beranek to the Penguins in exchange for this pick.
- ^{c} Compensatory pick received from NHL as compensation for free agent Craig Muni.

== Farm teams ==
The American Hockey League's Syracuse Crunch finished last overall in the standings with a record of 18-50-9-3.

== See also ==
- 1998–99 NHL season
