= 1998–99 Los Angeles Kings season =

National Hockey League team season

1998–99 Los Angeles Kings
- Division: 5th Pacific
- Conference: 11th Western
- 1998–99 record: 32–45–5
- Home record: 18–20–3
- Road record: 14–25–2
- Goals for: 189
- Goals against: 222

Team information
- General manager: Dave Taylor
- Coach: Larry Robinson
- Captain: Rob Blake
- Alternate captains: Mattias Norstrom; Luc Robitaille; Garry Galley
- Arena: Great Western Forum
- Average attendance: 12,795
- Minor league affiliates: Long Beach Ice Dogs; Springfield Falcons; Mississippi Sea Wolves

Team leaders
- Goals: Luc Robitaille (39)
- Assists: Luc Robitaille (35)
- Points: Luc Robitaille (74)
- Penalty minutes: Sean O'Donnell (186)
- Plus/minus: Donald Audette (+7)
- Wins: Stephane Fiset (18)
- Goals against average: Jamie Storr (2.40)

The 1998–99 Los Angeles Kings season was the Kings' 32nd season in the National Hockey League (NHL). This was the team's final season at the Great Western Forum before moving to the Staples Center for the 1999–2000 season. The Kings did not qualify for the 1999 playoffs, despite qualifying the previous year.

== Regular season ==
=== Final standings ===
Pacific Division
R	CR		GP	W	L	T	GF	GA	Pts
1	1	**Dallas Stars**	82	51	19	12	236	168	114
2	4	**Phoenix Coyotes**	82	39	31	12	205	197	90
3	6	**Mighty Ducks of Anaheim**	82	35	34	13	215	206	83
4	7	**San Jose Sharks**	82	31	33	18	196	191	80
5	11	Los Angeles Kings	82	32	45	5	189	222	69

Note: CR = Conference rank; GP = Games played; W = Wins; L = Losses; T = Ties; GF = Goals for; GA = Goals against; Pts = Points
Bolded teams qualified for the playoffs.

Western Conference
R		Div	GP	W	L	T	GF	GA	Pts
**1**	**p – Dallas Stars**	**PAC**	**82**	**51**	**19**	**12**	**236**	**168**	**114**
**2**	**y – Colorado Avalanche**	**NW**	**82**	**44**	**28**	**10**	**239**	**205**	**98**
**3**	**y – Detroit Red Wings**	**CEN**	**82**	**43**	**32**	**7**	**245**	**202**	**93**
**4**	**Phoenix Coyotes**	**PAC**	**82**	**39**	**31**	**12**	**205**	**197**	**90**
**5**	**St. Louis Blues**	**CEN**	**82**	**37**	**32**	**13**	**237**	**209**	**87**
**6**	**Mighty Ducks of Anaheim**	**PAC**	**82**	**35**	**34**	**13**	**215**	**206**	**83**
**7**	**San Jose Sharks**	**PAC**	**82**	**31**	**33**	**18**	**196**	**191**	**80**
**8**	**Edmonton Oilers**	**NW**	**82**	**33**	**37**	**12**	**230**	**226**	**78**
9	Calgary Flames	NW	82	30	40	12	211	234	72
10	Chicago Blackhawks	CEN	82	29	41	12	202	248	70
11	Los Angeles Kings	PAC	82	32	45	5	189	222	69
12	Nashville Predators	CEN	82	28	47	7	190	261	63
13	Vancouver Canucks	NW	82	23	47	12	192	258	58

Divisions: CEN – Central, PAC – Pacific, NW – Northwest

bold – Qualified for playoffs; p – Won Presidents' Trophy; y – Won division

== Schedule and results ==
1998–99 regular season
October: 4–4–2 (home: 1–1–1; road: 3–3–1)

Game	Date	Score	Opponent	Record	Recap
1	October 10, 1998	2–1	@ Edmonton Oilers (1998–99)	1–0–0	W
2	October 12, 1998	2–4	@ Vancouver Canucks (1998–99)	1–1–0	L
3	October 16, 1998	2–1 OT	Boston Bruins (1998–99)	2–1–0	W
4	October 18, 1998	5–5 OT	Colorado Avalanche (1998–99)	2–1–1	T
5	October 21, 1998	1–1 OT	@ Florida Panthers (1998–99)	2–1–2	T
6	October 23, 1998	2–3	@ Tampa Bay Lightning (1998–99)	2–2–2	L
7	October 25, 1998	3–2	@ Carolina Hurricanes (1998–99)	3–2–2	W
8	October 27, 1998	0–1	@ New York Islanders (1998–99)	3–3–2	L
9	October 28, 1998	4–0	@ New Jersey Devils (1998–99)	4–3–2	W
10	October 30, 1998	0–3	Tampa Bay Lightning (1998–99)	4–4–2	L

November: 2–10–1 (home: 1–6–1; road: 1–4–0)

Game	Date	Score	Opponent	Record	Recap
11	November 1, 1998	0–3	Phoenix Coyotes (1998–99)	4–5–2	L
12	November 5, 1998	2–2 OT	St. Louis Blues (1998–99)	4–5–3	T
13	November 7, 1998	3–4	Dallas Stars (1998–99)	4–6–3	L
14	November 9, 1998	4–3	@ Vancouver Canucks (1998–99)	5–6–3	W
15	November 10, 1998	4–5 OT	@ Calgary Flames (1998–99)	5–7–3	L
16	November 12, 1998	1–3	Nashville Predators (1998–99)	5–8–3	L
17	November 14, 1998	3–5	Carolina Hurricanes (1998–99)	5–9–3	L
18	November 16, 1998	1–3	@ Mighty Ducks of Anaheim (1998–99)	5–10–3	L
19	November 18, 1998	4–5	@ San Jose Sharks (1998–99)	5–11–3	L
20	November 19, 1998	1–5	New York Rangers (1998–99)	5–12–3	L
21	November 21, 1998	5–0	Chicago Blackhawks (1998–99)	6–12–3	W
22	November 28, 1998	0–4	Phoenix Coyotes (1998–99)	6–13–3	L
23	November 30, 1998	1–3	@ Montreal Canadiens (1998–99)	6–14–3	L

December: 6–7–0 (home: 3–3–0; road: 3–4–0)

Game	Date	Score	Opponent	Record	Recap
24	December 2, 1998	1–3	@ Toronto Maple Leafs (1998–99)	6–15–3	L
25	December 3, 1998	1–3	@ Ottawa Senators (1998–99)	6–16–3	L
26	December 5, 1998	3–4	Detroit Red Wings (1998–99)	6–17–3	L
27	December 9, 1998	2–1	Washington Capitals (1998–99)	7–17–3	W
28	December 12, 1998	3–0	Vancouver Canucks (1998–99)	8–17–3	W
29	December 13, 1998	0–3	@ Mighty Ducks of Anaheim (1998–99)	8–18–3	L
30	December 17, 1998	4–5 OT	New York Islanders (1998–99)	8–19–3	L
31	December 19, 1998	2–5	@ St. Louis Blues (1998–99)	8–20–3	L
32	December 20, 1998	4–1	@ Chicago Blackhawks (1998–99)	9–20–3	W
33	December 22, 1998	3–0	@ Pittsburgh Penguins (1998–99)	10–20–3	W
34	December 26, 1998	1–2	Phoenix Coyotes (1998–99)	10–21–3	L
35	December 28, 1998	4–2	@ Phoenix Coyotes (1998–99)	11–21–3	W
36	December 30, 1998	5–1	San Jose Sharks (1998–99)	12–21–3	W

January: 5–6–1 (home: 3–3–1; road: 2–3–0)

Game	Date	Score	Opponent	Record	Recap
37	January 2, 1999	4–2	Colorado Avalanche (1998–99)	13–21–3	W
38	January 5, 1999	4–3 OT	@ Edmonton Oilers (1998–99)	14–21–3	W
39	January 7, 1999	4–2	Buffalo Sabres (1998–99)	15–21–3	W
40	January 9, 1999	1–1 OT	Edmonton Oilers (1998–99)	15–21–4	T
41	January 11, 1999	0–4	@ San Jose Sharks (1998–99)	15–22–4	L
42	January 14, 1999	3–0	Calgary Flames (1998–99)	16–22–4	W
43	January 16, 1999	1–5	Pittsburgh Penguins (1998–99)	16–23–4	L
44	January 19, 1999	4–5	Colorado Avalanche (1998–99)	16–24–4	L
45	January 21, 1999	2–3	New Jersey Devils (1998–99)	16–25–4	L
46	January 27, 1999	2–3	@ Dallas Stars (1998–99)	16–26–4	L
47	January 29, 1999	6–3	@ Washington Capitals (1998–99)	17–26–4	W
48	January 30, 1999	1–4	@ Buffalo Sabres (1998–99)	17–27–4	L

February: 6–6–1 (home: 4–2–0; road: 2–4–1)

Game	Date	Score	Opponent	Record	Recap
49	February 1, 1999	2–4	@ Philadelphia Flyers (1998–99)	17–28–4	L
50	February 4, 1999	3–2	Chicago Blackhawks (1998–99)	18–28–4	W
51	February 6, 1999	2–0	San Jose Sharks (1998–99)	19–28–4	W
52	February 10, 1999	0–3	@ Phoenix Coyotes (1998–99)	19–29–4	L
53	February 11, 1999	4–3	Philadelphia Flyers (1998–99)	20–29–4	W
54	February 13, 1999	2–3	Dallas Stars (1998–99)	20–30–4	L
55	February 15, 1999	1–3	Mighty Ducks of Anaheim (1998–99)	20–31–4	L
56	February 18, 1999	3–2	Edmonton Oilers (1998–99)	21–31–4	W
57	February 20, 1999	2–2 OT	@ Calgary Flames (1998–99)	21–31–5	T
58	February 22, 1999	1–5	@ St. Louis Blues (1998–99)	21–32–5	L
59	February 24, 1999	3–2 OT	@ Detroit Red Wings (1998–99)	22–32–5	W
60	February 26, 1999	2–1	@ Chicago Blackhawks (1998–99)	23–32–5	W
61	February 28, 1999	0–1	@ Dallas Stars (1998–99)	23–33–5	L

March: 5–8–0 (home: 4–4–0; road: 1–4–0)

Game	Date	Score	Opponent	Record	Recap
62	March 3, 1999	1–2	@ Mighty Ducks of Anaheim (1998–99)	23–34–5	L
63	March 4, 1999	3–4	Nashville Predators (1998–99)	23–35–5	L
64	March 6, 1999	1–4	Calgary Flames (1998–99)	23–36–5	L
65	March 9, 1999	4–2	Detroit Red Wings (1998–99)	24–36–5	W
66	March 13, 1999	3–1	Vancouver Canucks (1998–99)	25–36–5	W
67	March 15, 1999	4–0	Ottawa Senators (1998–99)	26–36–5	W
68	March 18, 1999	2–4	Mighty Ducks of Anaheim (1998–99)	26–37–5	L
69	March 20, 1999	4–3	Florida Panthers (1998–99)	27–37–5	W
70	March 21, 1999	1–4	@ Phoenix Coyotes (1998–99)	27–38–5	L
71	March 25, 1999	1–2	Dallas Stars (1998–99)	27–39–5	L
72	March 28, 1999	2–7	@ Colorado Avalanche (1998–99)	27–40–5	L
73	March 30, 1999	2–1 OT	@ Boston Bruins (1998–99)	28–40–5	W
74	March 31, 1999	1–2	@ Detroit Red Wings (1998–99)	28–41–5	L

April: 4–4–0 (home: 2–1–0; road: 2–3–0)

Game	Date	Score	Opponent	Record	Recap
75	April 3, 1999	2–3	@ Nashville Predators (1998–99)	28–42–5	L
76	April 5, 1999	1–4	@ Colorado Avalanche (1998–99)	28–43–5	L
77	April 8, 1999	3–2	San Jose Sharks (1998–99)	29–43–5	W
78	April 11, 1999	2–6	@ Dallas Stars (1998–99)	29–44–5	L
79	April 12, 1999	4–3	@ Nashville Predators (1998–99)	30–44–5	W
80	April 15, 1999	4–3 OT	Mighty Ducks of Anaheim (1998–99)	31–44–5	W
81	April 16, 1999	2–0	@ San Jose Sharks (1998–99)	32–44–5	W
82	April 18, 1999	2–3	St. Louis Blues (1998–99)	32–45–5	L

Legend: W Win (2 points) L Loss (0 points) T Tie (1 point)

== Player statistics ==
=== Scoring ===
- Position abbreviations: C = Center; D = Defense; G = Goaltender; LW = Left wing; RW = Right wing
- † = Joined team via a transaction (e.g., trade, waivers, signing) during the season. Stats reflect time with the Kings only.
- ‡ = Left team via a transaction (e.g., trade, waivers, release) during the season. Stats reflect time with the Kings only.

No.	Player	Pos	Regular season					
No.	Player	Pos	GP	G	A	Pts	+/-	PIM
20	Luc Robitaille	LW	82	39	35	74	−1	54
10 (Note: Audette wore number 34 in his first two games.)	Donald Audette†	RW	49	18	18	36	7	51
4	Rob Blake	D	62	12	23	35	−7	128
15	Jozef Stumpel	C	64	13	21	34	−18	10
27	Glen Murray	RW	61	16	15	31	−14	36
26	Ray Ferraro	C	65	13	18	31	0	59
44	Yanic Perreault‡	C	64	10	17	27	−3	30
9	Vladimir Tsyplakov	LW	69	11	12	23	−7	32
28	Steve Duchesne‡	D	60	4	19	23	−6	22
12	Olli Jokinen	C	66	9	12	21	−10	44
23	Craig Johnson	LW	69	7	12	19	−12	32
19	Russ Courtnall	RW	57	6	13	19	−9	19
3	Garry Galley	D	60	4	12	16	−9	30
55	Pavel Rosa	RW	29	4	12	16	0	6
8	Doug Bodger	D	65	3	11	14	1	34
6	Sean O'Donnell	D	80	1	13	14	1	186
22	Ian Laperriere	RW	72	3	10	13	−5	138
43	Philippe Boucher	D	45	2	6	8	−12	32
14	Mattias Norstrom	D	78	2	5	7	−10	36
45	Sandy Moger	C	42	3	2	5	−9	26
24	Nathan LaFayette	C	33	2	2	4	0	35
21 (Note: Green wore number 47 in his first two games.)	Josh Green	LW	27	1	3	4	−5	8
48	Mark Visheau	D	28	1	3	4	−7	107
17	Matt Johnson	LW	49	2	1	3	−5	131
44	Dave Babych†	D	8	0	2	2	−2	2
11	Jason Blake†	C	1	1	0	1	1	0
7	Steve McKenna	LW	20	1	0	1	−3	36
54	Jan Nemecek	D	6	1	0	1	−1	4
29	Eric Lacroix†‡	LW	27	0	1	1	−5	12
32	Manny Legace	G	17	0	1	1		0
33	Jaroslav Modry	D	5	0	1	1	1	0
29	Sean Pronger†	C	13	0	1	1	2	4
1	Jamie Storr	G	28	0	1	1		6
31	Ryan Bach†	G	3	0	0	0		0
42	Dan Bylsma	RW	8	0	0	0	−1	2
11	Brandon Convery†	C	3	0	0	0	−1	4
35	Stephane Fiset	G	42	0	0	0		2
28	Jason Podollan†	RW	6	0	0	0	−3	5
29	Roman Vopat‡	C	3	0	0	0	0	6

=== Goaltending ===
- † = Joined team via a transaction (e.g., trade, waivers, signing) during the season. Stats reflect time with the Kings only.

No.	Player	Regular season									
No.	Player	GP	W	L	T	SA	GA	GAA	SV%	SO	TOI
35	Stephane Fiset	42	18	21	1	1217	104	2.60	.915	3	2403
1	Jamie Storr	28	12	12	2	724	61	2.40	.916	4	1525
32	Manny Legace	17	2	9	2	439	39	2.60	.911	0	899
31	Ryan Bach†	3	0	3	0	66	8	4.44	.879	0	108

== Awards and records ==
=== Awards ===
Type	Award/honor	Recipient	Ref
League (annual)	NHL All-Rookie Team	Jamie Storr (Goaltender)	
League (in-season)	NHL All-Star Game selection	Rob Blake	
League (in-season)	NHL All-Star Game selection	Mattias Norstrom (Note: Norstrom and Robitaille were injury replacements, Robitaille for Steve Yzerman of the Detroit Red Wings.)	
League (in-season)	NHL All-Star Game selection	Luc Robitaille	
League (in-season)	NHL Rookie of the Month	Olli Jokinen (November)	
Team	Best Newcomer	Donald Audette	
Team	Bill Libby Memorial Award	Luc Robitaille	
Team	Defensive Player	Ian Laperriere	
Team	Jim Fox Community Service	Rob Blake	
Team	Jim Fox Community Service	Sean O'Donnell	
Team	Leading Scorer	Luc Robitaille	
Team	Most Inspirational	Mattias Norstrom	
Team	Most Popular Player	Luc Robitaille	
Team	Outstanding Defenseman	Mattias Norstrom	
Team	Unsung Hero	Mattias Norstrom	

=== Milestones ===
Milestone	Player	Date	Ref
First game	Josh Green	October 10, 1998	
First game	Manny Legace	October 21, 1998	
First game	Ryan Bach	October 23, 1998	
First game	Jan Nemecek	November 7, 1998	
First game	Pavel Rosa	December 17, 1998	
First game	Jason Blake	April 18, 1999	
1,000th game played	Doug Bodger	October 25, 1998	
1,000th game played	Garry Galley	February 1, 1999	
1,000th game played	Russ Courtnall	February 10, 1999	
1,000th game played	Ray Ferraro	February 28, 1999	

== Transactions ==
The Kings were involved in the following transactions during the 1998–99 season.

=== Trades ===
May 29, 1998	To Los Angeles Kings Future considerations	To Nashville Predators Marian Cisar
June 18, 1998	To Los Angeles Kings Doug Bodger	To New Jersey Devils 4th round pick in 1998 - Pierre Dagenais
June 26, 1998	To Los Angeles Kings Predators promise to not select Garry Galley in 1998 NHL expansion draft	To Nashville Predators Jan Vopat; Kimmo Timonen
July 7, 1998	To Los Angeles Kings Future considerations	To Nashville Predators Vitali Yachmenev
July 29, 1998	To Los Angeles Kings Manny Legace	To Carolina Hurricanes Future considerations
September 3, 1998	To Los Angeles Kings 3rd round pick in 1999 - Frantisek Kaberle	To Chicago Blackhawks Doug Zmolek
October 22, 1998	To Los Angeles Kings Ryan Bach	To Detroit Red Wings 6th round pick in 2000 - Par Backer
October 29, 1998	To Los Angeles Kings Eric Lacroix	To Colorado Avalanche Roman Vopat; 6th round pick in 1999 - Martin Prusek
December 18, 1998	To Los Angeles Kings Donald Audette	To Buffalo Sabres 2nd round pick in 1999 - Milan Bartovic
February 12, 1999	To Los Angeles Kings Sean Pronger	To New York Rangers Eric Lacroix
March 23, 1999	To Los Angeles Kings Dave Babych; 5th round pick in 2000 - Nathan Marsters	To Philadelphia Flyers Steve Duchesne
March 23, 1999	To Los Angeles Kings Jason Podollan; 3rd round pick in 1999 - Cory Campbell	To Toronto Maple Leafs Yanic Perreault

=== Free agent signings ===
July 2, 1998	From St. Louis Blues Steve Duchesne (3 years, $11.25 million)
April 17, 1999	From University of North Dakota (WCHA) Jason Blake

=== Free agents lost ===
July 22, 1998	To Boston Bruins Chris Taylor (1 year, $350,000)
August 18, 1998	To New York Islanders Steve Valiquette
August 26, 1998	To Cincinnati Cyclones (IHL) Jeff Shevalier

=== Expansion draft ===
June 26, 1998	To Nashville Predators Frederic Chabot

=== Waivers ===
July 17, 1998	From Nashville Predators Frederic Chabot
October 5, 1998	To Montreal Canadiens Frederic Chabot
November 19, 1998	From Vancouver Canucks Brandon Convery

== Draft picks ==
Los Angeles's draft picks at the 1998 NHL entry draft held at the Marine Midland Arena in Buffalo, New York.

Round	#	Player	Nationality	College/Junior/Club team (League)
1	21	Mathieu Biron	Canada	Shawinigan Cataractes (QMJHL)
2	46	Justin Papineau	Canada	Belleville Bulls (OHL)
3	76	Aleksei Volkov	Russia	Krylya Sovetov-2 (Russia)
4	103	Kip Brennan	Canada	Sudbury Wolves (OHL)
5	133	Joe Rullier	Canada	Rimouski Océanic (QMJHL)
6	163	Tomas Zizka	Czech Republic	ZPS Zlín (Czech Republic)
7	190	Tommi Hannus	Finland	TPS Jr. (Finland)
8	217	Jim Henkel	United States	Ottawa 67's (OHL)
9	248	Matthew Yeats	Canada	Olds Grizzlys (AJHL)

== See also ==
- 1998–99 NHL season
