= Pronger =

Pronger is a surname. Notable people with the surname include:

- Chris Pronger (born 1974), Canadian ice hockey player
- Sean Pronger (born 1972), Canadian ice hockey player
