= 1998–99 Tampa Bay Lightning season =

National Hockey League team season

1998–99 Tampa Bay Lightning
- Division: 4th Southeast
- Conference: 14th Eastern
- 1998–99 record: 19–54–9
- Home record: 12–25–4
- Road record: 7–29–5
- Goals for: 179
- Goals against: 292

Team information
- General manager: Phil Esposito (Oct.); Jacques Demers (Oct.–Apr.)
- Coach: Jacques Demers
- Captain: Rob Zamuner
- Arena: Ice Palace
- Average attendance: 11,510
- Minor league affiliates: Cleveland Lumberjacks; Chesapeake Icebreakers

Team leaders
- Goals: Wendel Clark (28)
- Assists: Darcy Tucker (22)
- Points: Darcy Tucker (43)
- Penalty minutes: Darcy Tucker (176)
- Plus/minus: Andrei Skopintsev (+1)
- Wins: Corey Schwab (8)
- Goals against average: Corey Schwab (3.52)

The 1998–99 Tampa Bay Lightning season was the franchise's seventh season of operation in the National Hockey League (NHL). For the third consecutive year, the Lighting were unable to qualify for the playoffs for the third year in a row for the first time since the 1992–93 season and the 1994–95 season. They also finished in last place for the second consecutive year as well.

== Offseason ==
On the eve of the regular season opener, Mikael Renberg stepped down as team captain and was replaced by Rob Zamuner.

== Regular season ==
The Lightning again finished last in scoring, with just 179 goals for. They also allowed the most goals of all 27 teams, with 292 goals against.

=== All-Star Game ===
The logo for the All-Star Game.

The 49th National Hockey League All-Star Game took place on January 24, 1999, at the Ice Palace in Tampa Bay, Florida, home to the Tampa Bay Lightning. It would be Wayne Gretzky's last All-Star Game.

=== Season standings ===
Southeast Division
R	CR		GP	W	L	T	GF	GA	PIM	Pts
1	3	**Carolina Hurricanes**	82	34	30	18	210	202	1158	86
2	9	Florida Panthers	82	30	34	18	210	228	1522	78
3	12	Washington Capitals	82	31	45	6	200	218	1381	68
4	14	Tampa Bay Lightning	82	19	54	9	179	292	1316	47

Eastern Conference
R		Div	GP	W	L	T	GF	GA	Pts
**1**	**y – New Jersey Devils**	**ATL**	**82**	**47**	**24**	**11**	**248**	**196**	**105**
**2**	**y – Ottawa Senators**	**NE**	**82**	**44**	**23**	**15**	**239**	**179**	**103**
**3**	**y – Carolina Hurricanes**	**SE**	**82**	**34**	**30**	**18**	**210**	**202**	**86**
**4**	**Toronto Maple Leafs**	**NE**	**82**	**45**	**30**	**7**	**268**	**231**	**97**
**5**	**Philadelphia Flyers**	**ATL**	**82**	**37**	**26**	**19**	**231**	**196**	**93**
**6**	**Boston Bruins**	**NE**	**82**	**39**	**30**	**13**	**214**	**181**	**91**
**7**	**Buffalo Sabres**	**NE**	**82**	**37**	**28**	**17**	**207**	**175**	**91**
**8**	**Pittsburgh Penguins**	**ATL**	**82**	**38**	**30**	**14**	**242**	**225**	**90**
9	Florida Panthers	SE	82	30	34	18	210	228	78
10	New York Rangers	ATL	82	33	38	11	217	227	77
11	Montreal Canadiens	NE	82	32	39	11	184	209	75
12	Washington Capitals	SE	82	31	45	6	200	218	68
13	New York Islanders	ATL	82	24	48	10	194	244	58
14	Tampa Bay Lightning	SE	82	19	54	9	179	292	47

Divisions: ATL – Atlantic Division, NE – Northeast Division, SE – Southeast Division

bold – Qualified for playoffs; y – Won division

== Schedule and results ==
1998–99 regular season
October: 4–6–1 (home: 3–3–0; road: 1–3–1)

Game	Date	Score	Opponent	Record	Recap
1	October 9, 1998	1–4	@ Florida Panthers (1998–99)	0–1–0	L
2	October 10, 1998	4–4 OT	@ Carolina Hurricanes (1998–99)	0–1–1	T
3	October 14, 1998	0–2	New York Islanders (1998–99)	0–2–1	L
4	October 16, 1998	2–5	Philadelphia Flyers (1998–99)	0–3–1	L
5	October 18, 1998	1–4	Washington Capitals (1998–99)	0–4–1	L
6	October 21, 1998	5–0	Pittsburgh Penguins (1998–99)	1–4–1	W
7	October 23, 1998	3–2	Los Angeles Kings (1998–99)	2–4–1	W
8	October 25, 1998	3–2	Vancouver Canucks (1998–99)	3–4–1	W
9	October 28, 1998	3–5	@ Mighty Ducks of Anaheim (1998–99)	3–5–1	L
10	October 30, 1998	3–0	@ Los Angeles Kings (1998–99)	4–5–1	W
11	October 31, 1998	1–6	@ San Jose Sharks (1998–99)	4–6–1	L

November: 2–8–1 (home: 1–5–1; road: 1–3–0)

Game	Date	Score	Opponent	Record	Recap
12	November 4, 1998	5–2	@ Washington Capitals (1998–99)	5–6–1	W
13	November 6, 1998	2–2 OT	Chicago Blackhawks (1998–99)	5–6–2	T
14	November 8, 1998	3–1	New Jersey Devils (1998–99)	6–6–2	W
15	November 10, 1998	2–10	New York Rangers (1998–99)	6–7–2	L
16	November 13, 1998	1–8	@ Colorado Avalanche (1998–99)	6–8–2	L
17	November 14, 1998	1–4	@ Phoenix Coyotes (1998–99)	6–9–2	L
18	November 19, 1998	1–5	Pittsburgh Penguins (1998–99)	6–10–2	L
19	November 21, 1998	2–5	@ Pittsburgh Penguins (1998–99)	6–11–2	L
20	November 24, 1998	1–4	Boston Bruins (1998–99)	6–12–2	L
21	November 27, 1998	1–2	Florida Panthers (1998–99)	6–13–2	L
22	November 29, 1998	3–6	Buffalo Sabres (1998–99)	6–14–2	L

December: 3–10–1 (home: 1–4–0; road: 2–6–1)

Game	Date	Score	Opponent	Record	Recap
23	December 3, 1998	1–4	@ Calgary Flames (1998–99)	6–15–2	L
24	December 4, 1998	2–1	@ Edmonton Oilers (1998–99)	7–15–2	W
25	December 6, 1998	5–7	@ Chicago Blackhawks (1998–99)	7–16–2	L
26	December 8, 1998	2–4	Ottawa Senators (1998–99)	7–17–2	L
27	December 11, 1998	1–2	Calgary Flames (1998–99)	7–18–2	L
28	December 12, 1998	2–1 OT	@ New York Islanders (1998–99)	8–18–2	W
29	December 15, 1998	2–3 OT	@ Pittsburgh Penguins (1998–99)	8–19–2	L
30	December 18, 1998	1–4	Edmonton Oilers (1998–99)	8–20–2	L
31	December 20, 1998	2–2 OT	@ Philadelphia Flyers (1998–99)	8–20–3	T
32	December 21, 1998	2–3	@ Boston Bruins (1998–99)	8–21–3	L
33	December 23, 1998	0–2	@ Buffalo Sabres (1998–99)	8–22–3	L
34	December 26, 1998	1–3	Florida Panthers (1998–99)	8–23–3	L
35	December 29, 1998	3–0	New York Islanders (1998–99)	9–23–3	W
36	December 30, 1998	3–4	@ Carolina Hurricanes (1998–99)	9–24–3	L

January: 2–9–1 (home: 1–3–0; road: 1–6–1)

Game	Date	Score	Opponent	Record	Recap
37	January 4, 1999	4–5 OT	@ Toronto Maple Leafs (1998–99)	9–25–3	L
38	January 7, 1999	1–4	@ Montreal Canadiens (1998–99)	9–26–3	L
39	January 8, 1999	1–5	@ Ottawa Senators (1998–99)	9–27–3	L
40	January 10, 1999	2–5	@ New York Rangers (1998–99)	9–28–3	L
41	January 12, 1999	3–4	Toronto Maple Leafs (1998–99)	9–29–3	L
42	January 15, 1999	1–3	@ New Jersey Devils (1998–99)	9–30–3	L
43	January 16, 1999	2–2 OT	@ Boston Bruins (1998–99)	9–30–4	T
44	January 19, 1999	2–1	Buffalo Sabres (1998–99)	10–30–4	W
45	January 21, 1999	3–2	@ Nashville Predators (1998–99)	11–30–4	W
46	January 26, 1999	1–2	Montreal Canadiens (1998–99)	11–31–4	L
47	January 29, 1999	1–4	Dallas Stars (1998–99)	11–32–4	L
48	January 30, 1999	2–6	@ Philadelphia Flyers (1998–99)	11–33–4	L

February: 2–8–1 (home: 2–6–0; road: 0–2–1)

Game	Date	Score	Opponent	Record	Recap
49	February 2, 1999	0–3	Toronto Maple Leafs (1998–99)	11–34–4	L
50	February 3, 1999	1–10	@ Washington Capitals (1998–99)	11–35–4	L
51	February 5, 1999	3–5	Mighty Ducks of Anaheim (1998–99)	11–36–4	L
52	February 10, 1999	4–5	St. Louis Blues (1998–99)	11–37–4	L
53	February 13, 1999	1–3	San Jose Sharks (1998–99)	11–38–4	L
54	February 15, 1999	3–3 OT	@ New York Islanders (1998–99)	11–38–5	T
55	February 17, 1999	1–7	@ New Jersey Devils (1998–99)	11–39–5	L
56	February 19, 1999	4–2	Phoenix Coyotes (1998–99)	12–39–5	W
57	February 20, 1999	2–3	Carolina Hurricanes (1998–99)	12–40–5	L
58	February 22, 1999	2–3	New Jersey Devils (1998–99)	12–41–5	L
59	February 26, 1999	4–1	Philadelphia Flyers (1998–99)	13–41–5	W

March: 4–9–1 (home: 2–4–0; road: 2–5–1)

Game	Date	Score	Opponent	Record	Recap
60	March 2, 1999	2–8	Washington Capitals (1998–99)	13–42–5	L
61	March 4, 1999	2–1	Colorado Avalanche (1998–99)	14–42–5	W
62	March 6, 1999	6–1	@ Montreal Canadiens (1998–99)	15–42–5	W
63	March 8, 1999	3–9	@ Ottawa Senators (1998–99)	15–43–5	L
64	March 9, 1999	1–6	@ Toronto Maple Leafs (1998–99)	15–44–5	L
65	March 11, 1999	5–2	@ Buffalo Sabres (1998–99)	16–44–5	W
66	March 13, 1999	0–1	@ Florida Panthers (1998–99)	16–45–5	L
67	March 17, 1999	0–2	Pittsburgh Penguins (1998–99)	16–46–5	L
68	March 19, 1999	3–5	Detroit Red Wings (1998–99)	16–47–5	L
69	March 22, 1999	6–3	New York Rangers (1998–99)	17–47–5	W
70	March 24, 1999	0–3	Nashville Predators (1998–99)	17–48–5	L
71	March 26, 1999	1–6	@ Detroit Red Wings (1998–99)	17–49–5	L
72	March 28, 1999	3–3 OT	@ Carolina Hurricanes (1998–99)	17–49–6	T
73	March 31, 1999	4–6	@ Dallas Stars (1998–99)	17–50–6	L

April: 2–4–3 (home: 2–0–3; road: 0–4–0)

Game	Date	Score	Opponent	Record	Recap
74	April 1, 1999	0–3	@ St. Louis Blues (1998–99)	17–51–6	L
75	April 3, 1999	4–3	Washington Capitals (1998–99)	18–51–6	W
76	April 5, 1999	4–4 OT	Ottawa Senators (1998–99)	18–51–7	T
77	April 8, 1999	3–0	Boston Bruins (1998–99)	19–51–7	W
78	April 10, 1999	2–3	@ Boston Bruins (1998–99)	19–52–7	L
79	April 12, 1999	1–2	@ New York Rangers (1998–99)	19–53–7	L
80	April 13, 1999	2–2 OT	Montreal Canadiens (1998–99)	19–53–8	T
81	April 16, 1999	2–2 OT	Carolina Hurricanes (1998–99)	19–53–9	T
82	April 17, 1999	2–6	@ Florida Panthers (1998–99)	19–54–9	L

Legend: W Win (2 points) L Loss (0 points) T Tie (1 point)

== Player statistics ==
=== Scoring ===
- Position abbreviations: C = Center; D = Defense; G = Goaltender; LW = Left wing; RW = Right wing
- † = Joined team via a transaction (e.g., trade, waivers, signing) during the season. Stats reflect time with the Lightning only.
- ‡ = Left team via a transaction (e.g., trade, waivers, release) during the season. Stats reflect time with the Lightning only.

No.	Player	Pos	Regular season					
No.	Player	Pos	GP	G	A	Pts	+/-	PIM
16	Darcy Tucker	RW	82	21	22	43	−34	176
17	Wendel Clark‡	LW	65	28	14	42	−25	35
44	Stephane Richer	RW	64	12	21	33	−10	22
8	Vincent Lecavalier	C	82	13	15	28	−19	23
77 (Note: Gratton wore number 20 in his first two games.)	Chris Gratton†	C	52	7	19	26	−20	102
33	Benoit Hogue‡	C	62	11	14	25	−12	50
21	Craig Janney‡	C	38	4	18	22	−13	10
13 (Note: Kubina wore number 3 in his first game.)	Pavel Kubina	D	68	9	12	21	−33	80
7	Rob Zamuner	LW	58	8	11	19	−15	24
61 (Note: Selivanov wore number 29 through December 8.)	Alexander Selivanov‡	RW	43	6	13	19	−8	18
4	Cory Cross	D	67	2	16	18	−25	92
5	Jassen Cullimore	D	78	5	12	17	−22	81
23	Petr Svoboda†	D	34	1	16	17	−4	53
21	Alexandre Daigle†	C	32	6	6	12	−12	2
10	Sandy McCarthy‡	RW	67	5	7	12	−22	135
20	Mikael Renberg‡	RW	20	4	8	12	−2	4
26 (Note: Sillinger wore number 18 in his first game.)	Mike Sillinger†	C	54	8	2	10	−20	28
18	Daymond Langkow‡	C	22	4	6	10	0	15
9 (Note: Nylander wore number 25 in his first game.)	Michael Nylander†	C	24	2	7	9	−10	6
49 (Note: Wilkie wore number 6 through January 21.)	David Wilkie	D	46	1	7	8	−19	69
14	Robert Petrovicky†	C	28	3	4	7	−8	6
2	Mike McBain	D	37	0	6	6	−11	14
34	Mikael Andersson‡	LW	40	2	3	5	−8	4
28	Kjell Samuelsson†	D	46	1	4	5	−6	38
27	Colin Forbes†	C	14	3	1	4	−5	10
11	Steve Kelly	C	34	1	3	4	−15	27
32	Corey Schwab	G	40	0	4	4		4
14	Karl Dykhuis‡	D	33	2	1	3	−21	18
27 (Note: Peterson wore number 47 through January 21.)	Brent Peterson‡	LW	20	2	1	3	−2	0
55	Drew Bannister†	D	21	1	2	3	−4	24
23	Michal Sykora	D	10	1	2	3	−7	0
64	Jason Bonsignore	C	23	0	3	3	−4	8
3	Sergey Gusev†	D	14	0	3	3	−8	10
62	Andrei Nazarov‡	LW	26	2	0	2	−5	43
39	Enrico Ciccone‡	D	16	1	1	2	−1	24
22	Paul Mara	D	1	1	1	2	−3	0
46	Andrei Skopintsev	D	19	1	1	2	1	10
6	Karel Betik	D	3	0	2	2	−3	2
3	Sami Helenius†‡	D	4	1	0	1	−3	15
93	Daren Puppa	G	13	0	1	1		0
20	Corey Spring	RW	8	0	1	1	0	2
15	Paul Ysebaert	C	10	0	1	1	−5	2
1	Zac Bierk	G	1	0	0	0		0
12	John Cullen‡	C	4	0	0	0	−2	2
43	Xavier Delisle	C	2	0	0	0	0	0
31	Kevin Hodson†	G	5	0	0	0		0
71	Mario Larocque	D	5	0	0	0	−4	16
30	Bill Ranford‡	G	32	0	0	0		2
35	Derek Wilkinson	G	5	0	0	0		0

=== Goaltending ===
- † = Joined team via a transaction (e.g., trade, waivers, signing) during the season. Stats reflect time with the Lightning only.
- ‡ = Left team via a transaction (e.g., trade, waivers, release) during the season. Stats reflect time with the Lightning only.

No.	Player	Regular season									
No.	Player	GP	W	L	T	SA	GA	GAA	SV%	SO	TOI
32	Corey Schwab	40	8	25	3	1153	126	3.52	.891	0	2146
93	Daren Puppa	13	5	6	1	350	33	2.87	.906	2	691
30	Bill Ranford‡	32	3	18	3	858	102	3.90	.881	1	1568
31	Kevin Hodson†	5	2	1	1	118	11	2.77	.907	0	238
35	Derek Wilkinson	5	1	3	1	128	13	3.08	.898	0	253
1	Zac Bierk	1	0	1	0	21	2	2.03	.905	0	59

== Awards and records ==
=== Awards ===
Type	Award/honor	Recipient	Ref
League (annual)	Bill Masterton Memorial Trophy	John Cullen	
League (in-season)	NHL All-Star Game selection	Wendel Clark	
League (in-season)	NHL Rookie of the Month	Vincent Lecavalier (February)	

=== Milestones ===
Milestone	Player	Date	Ref
First game	Vincent Lecavalier	October 9, 1998	
First game	Andrei Skopintsev	November 19, 1998	
First game	Mario Larocque	January 7, 1999	
First game	Xavier Delisle	February 13, 1999	
First game	Karel Betik	February 15, 1999	
First game	Paul Mara	April 17, 1999	

== Draft picks ==
Tampa Bay's draft picks at the 1998 NHL entry draft held at the Marine Midland Arena in Buffalo, New York.

Round	#	Player	Nationality	College/Junior/Club team (League)
1	1	Vincent Lecavalier	Canada	Rimouski Oceanic (QMJHL)
3	64	Brad Richards	Canada	Rimouski Oceanic (QMJHL)
3	72	Dmitri Afanasenkov	Russia	Torpedo Yaroslavl (Russia)
4	92	Eric Beaudoin	Canada	Guelph Storm (OHL)
5	121	Curtis Rich	Canada	Calgary Hitmen (WHL)
6	146	Sergei Kuznetsov	Russia	Torpedo-2 Yaroslavl (Russia)
7	174	Brett Allan	Canada	Swift Current Broncos (WHL)
7	194	Oak Hewer	Canada	North Bay Centennials (OHL)
8	221	Daniel Hulak	Canada	Swift Current Broncos (WHL)
9	229	Chris Lyness	Canada	Cape Breton Screaming Eagles (QMJHL)
