= 1998–99 Florida Panthers season =

National Hockey League team season

1998–99 Florida Panthers
- Division: 2nd Southeast
- Conference: 9th Eastern
- 1998–99 record: 30–34–18
- Home record: 17–17–7
- Road record: 13–17–11
- Goals for: 210
- Goals against: 228

Team information
- General manager: Bryan Murray
- Coach: Terry Murray
- Captain: Scott Mellanby
- Arena: National Car Rental Center
- Average attendance: 18,493
- Minor league affiliates: Beast of New Haven; Kentucky Thoroughblades; Miami Matadors; Port Huron Border Cats

Team leaders
- Goals: Ray Whitney (26)
- Assists: Ray Whitney (38)
- Points: Ray Whitney (64)
- Penalty minutes: Peter Worrell (258)
- Plus/minus: Jaroslav Spacek (+15)
- Wins: Sean Burke (21)
- Goals against average: Sean Burke (2.66)

The 1998–99 Florida Panthers season was their sixth season in the National Hockey League (NHL). Though they made a major move in acquiring star forward Pavel Bure during the season, the Panthers failed to qualify for the playoffs for the second consecutive season for the first time since the 1993–94 season and the 1994–95 season.

== Regular season ==
=== Final standings ===
Southeast Division
R	CR		GP	W	L	T	GF	GA	PIM	Pts
1	3	**Carolina Hurricanes**	82	34	30	18	210	202	1158	86
2	9	Florida Panthers	82	30	34	18	210	228	1522	78
3	12	Washington Capitals	82	31	45	6	200	218	1381	68
4	14	Tampa Bay Lightning	82	19	54	9	179	292	1316	47

Eastern Conference
R		Div	GP	W	L	T	GF	GA	Pts
**1**	**y – New Jersey Devils**	**ATL**	**82**	**47**	**24**	**11**	**248**	**196**	**105**
**2**	**y – Ottawa Senators**	**NE**	**82**	**44**	**23**	**15**	**239**	**179**	**103**
**3**	**y – Carolina Hurricanes**	**SE**	**82**	**34**	**30**	**18**	**210**	**202**	**86**
**4**	**Toronto Maple Leafs**	**NE**	**82**	**45**	**30**	**7**	**268**	**231**	**97**
**5**	**Philadelphia Flyers**	**ATL**	**82**	**37**	**26**	**19**	**231**	**196**	**93**
**6**	**Boston Bruins**	**NE**	**82**	**39**	**30**	**13**	**214**	**181**	**91**
**7**	**Buffalo Sabres**	**NE**	**82**	**37**	**28**	**17**	**207**	**175**	**91**
**8**	**Pittsburgh Penguins**	**ATL**	**82**	**38**	**30**	**14**	**242**	**225**	**90**
9	Florida Panthers	SE	82	30	34	18	210	228	78
10	New York Rangers	ATL	82	33	38	11	217	227	77
11	Montreal Canadiens	NE	82	32	39	11	184	209	75
12	Washington Capitals	SE	82	31	45	6	200	218	68
13	New York Islanders	ATL	82	24	48	10	194	244	58
14	Tampa Bay Lightning	SE	82	19	54	9	179	292	47

Divisions: ATL – Atlantic Division, NE – Northeast Division, SE – Southeast Division

bold – Qualified for playoffs; y – Won division

== Schedule and results ==
1998–99 regular season
October: 3–3–3 (home: 1–2–1; road: 2–1–2)

Game	Date	Score	Opponent	Record	Recap
1	October 9, 1998	4–1	Tampa Bay Lightning (1998–99)	1–0–0	W
2	October 10, 1998	1–0	@ Nashville Predators (1998–99)	2–0–0	W
3	October 16, 1998	2–2 OT	@ Buffalo Sabres (1998–99)	2–0–1	T
4	October 21, 1998	1–1 OT	Los Angeles Kings (1998–99)	2–0–2	T
5	October 23, 1998	0–5	Vancouver Canucks (1998–99)	2–1–2	L
6	October 24, 1998	2–2 OT	@ Washington Capitals (1998–99)	2–1–3	T
7	October 28, 1998	2–7	Detroit Red Wings (1998–99)	2–2–3	L
8	October 30, 1998	7–3	@ Chicago Blackhawks (1998–99)	3–2–3	W
9	October 31, 1998	1–3	@ New Jersey Devils (1998–99)	3–3–3	L

November: 5–5–2 (home: 3–3–0; road: 2–2–2)

Game	Date	Score	Opponent	Record	Recap
10	November 2, 1998	2–6	@ New York Islanders (1998–99)	3–4–3	L
11	November 4, 1998	2–1	Chicago Blackhawks (1998–99)	4–4–3	W
12	November 7, 1998	3–4	New Jersey Devils (1998–99)	4–5–3	L
13	November 11, 1998	4–1	New York Rangers (1998–99)	5–5–3	W
14	November 12, 1998	2–1	@ Philadelphia Flyers (1998–99)	6–5–3	W
15	November 14, 1998	0–4	@ Pittsburgh Penguins (1998–99)	6–6–3	L
16	November 19, 1998	5–5 OT	@ Boston Bruins (1998–99)	6–6–4	T
17	November 21, 1998	3–3 OT	@ New Jersey Devils (1998–99)	6–6–5	T
18	November 22, 1998	1–2 OT	Philadelphia Flyers (1998–99)	6–7–5	L
19	November 25, 1998	0–1	Boston Bruins (1998–99)	6–8–5	L
20	November 27, 1998	2–1	@ Tampa Bay Lightning (1998–99)	7–8–5	W
21	November 28, 1998	6–2	Buffalo Sabres (1998–99)	8–8–5	W

December: 5–5–1 (home: 4–2–1; road: 1–3–0)

Game	Date	Score	Opponent	Record	Recap
22	December 1, 1998	4–5 OT	@ New York Rangers (1998–99)	8–9–5	L
23	December 2, 1998	1–2	@ Buffalo Sabres (1998–99)	8–10–5	L
24	December 5, 1998	3–3 OT	Carolina Hurricanes (1998–99)	8–10–6	T
25	December 9, 1998	6–5	Ottawa Senators (1998–99)	9–10–6	W
26	December 12, 1998	2–4	Calgary Flames (1998–99)	9–11–6	L
27	December 16, 1998	4–1	Pittsburgh Penguins (1998–99)	10–11–6	W
28	December 19, 1998	3–1	Edmonton Oilers (1998–99)	11–11–6	W
29	December 23, 1998	0–4	Washington Capitals (1998–99)	11–12–6	L
30	December 26, 1998	3–1	@ Tampa Bay Lightning (1998–99)	12–12–6	W
31	December 28, 1998	5–1	New York Islanders (1998–99)	13–12–6	W
32	December 30, 1998	4–7	@ Pittsburgh Penguins (1998–99)	13–13–6	L

January: 5–4–6 (home: 2–3–2; road: 3–1–4)

Game	Date	Score	Opponent	Record	Recap
33	January 1, 1999	3–3 OT	Carolina Hurricanes (1998–99)	13–13–7	T
34	January 2, 1999	2–4	Pittsburgh Penguins (1998–99)	13–14–7	L
35	January 5, 1999	2–2 OT	@ Phoenix Coyotes (1998–99)	13–14–8	T
36	January 6, 1999	2–2 OT	@ Colorado Avalanche (1998–99)	13–14–9	T
37	January 8, 1999	1–1 OT	@ Vancouver Canucks (1998–99)	13–14–10	T
38	January 10, 1999	2–1	@ Calgary Flames (1998–99)	14–14–10	W
39	January 13, 1999	3–3 OT	Toronto Maple Leafs (1998–99)	14–14–11	T
40	January 14, 1999	2–3	@ Carolina Hurricanes (1998–99)	14–15–11	L
41	January 16, 1999	1–0	New York Islanders (1998–99)	15–15–11	W
42	January 18, 1999	0–4	Buffalo Sabres (1998–99)	15–16–11	L
43	January 20, 1999	5–2	@ New York Islanders (1998–99)	16–16–11	W
44	January 21, 1999	2–1	@ New York Rangers (1998–99)	17–16–11	W
45	January 26, 1999	3–3 OT	@ Philadelphia Flyers (1998–99)	17–16–12	T
46	January 27, 1999	2–1	Montreal Canadiens (1998–99)	18–16–12	W
47	January 30, 1999	2–5	Dallas Stars (1998–99)	18–17–12	L

February: 4–5–4 (home: 3–1–1; road: 1–4–3)

Game	Date	Score	Opponent	Record	Recap
48	February 3, 1999	5–2	Toronto Maple Leafs (1998–99)	19–17–12	W
49	February 5, 1999	0–3	@ Pittsburgh Penguins (1998–99)	19–18–12	L
50	February 6, 1999	3–3 OT	@ Carolina Hurricanes (1998–99)	19–18–13	T
51	February 8, 1999	4–5	St. Louis Blues (1998–99)	19–19–13	L
52	February 11, 1999	3–1	@ Ottawa Senators (1998–99)	20–19–13	W
53	February 13, 1999	0–4	@ Montreal Canadiens (1998–99)	20–20–13	L
54	February 15, 1999	2–2 OT	San Jose Sharks (1998–99)	20–20–14	T
55	February 17, 1999	1–2	@ Dallas Stars (1998–99)	20–21–14	L
56	February 18, 1999	0–0 OT	@ St. Louis Blues (1998–99)	20–21–15	T
57	February 20, 1999	7–1	Phoenix Coyotes (1998–99)	21–21–15	W
58	February 24, 1999	5–3	Philadelphia Flyers (1998–99)	22–21–15	W
59	February 26, 1999	5–5 OT	@ Detroit Red Wings (1998–99)	22–21–16	T
60	February 27, 1999	1–4	@ Toronto Maple Leafs (1998–99)	22–22–16	L

March: 5–6–2 (home: 2–3–2; road: 3–3–0)

Game	Date	Score	Opponent	Record	Recap
61	March 3, 1999	5–7	Colorado Avalanche (1998–99)	22–23–16	L
62	March 6, 1999	2–2 OT	Carolina Hurricanes (1998–99)	22–23–17	T
63	March 8, 1999	5–2	@ Montreal Canadiens (1998–99)	23–23–17	W
64	March 9, 1999	0–2	@ Boston Bruins (1998–99)	23–24–17	L
65	March 11, 1999	2–1	@ Washington Capitals (1998–99)	24–24–17	W
66	March 13, 1999	1–0	Tampa Bay Lightning (1998–99)	25–24–17	W
67	March 17, 1999	2–4	@ San Jose Sharks (1998–99)	25–25–17	L
68	March 20, 1999	3–4	@ Los Angeles Kings (1998–99)	25–26–17	L
69	March 21, 1999	5–2	@ Mighty Ducks of Anaheim (1998–99)	26–26–17	W
70	March 24, 1999	1–2	New York Rangers (1998–99)	26–27–17	L
71	March 26, 1999	4–1	Nashville Predators (1998–99)	27–27–17	W
72	March 28, 1999	2–2 OT	New Jersey Devils (1998–99)	27–27–18	T
73	March 31, 1999	3–5	New York Islanders (1998–99)	27–28–18	L

April: 3–6–0 (home: 2–3–0; road: 1–3–0)

Game	Date	Score	Opponent	Record	Recap
74	April 1, 1999	3–5	@ Washington Capitals (1998–99)	27–29–18	L
75	April 3, 1999	4–6	Ottawa Senators (1998–99)	27–30–18	L
76	April 5, 1999	0–3	Washington Capitals (1998–99)	27–31–18	L
77	April 7, 1999	2–5	Boston Bruins (1998–99)	27–32–18	L
78	April 9, 1999	1–3	@ Buffalo Sabres (1998–99)	27–33–18	L
79	April 10, 1999	1–9	@ Toronto Maple Leafs (1998–99)	27–34–18	L
80	April 12, 1999	2–0	@ Ottawa Senators (1998–99)	28–34–18	W
81	April 14, 1999	3–2 OT	Montreal Canadiens (1998–99)	29–34–18	W
82	April 17, 1999	6–2	Tampa Bay Lightning (1998–99)	30–34–18	W

Legend: W Win (2 points) L Loss (0 points) T Tie (1 point)

== Player statistics ==
=== Scoring ===
- Position abbreviations: C = Center; D = Defense; G = Goaltender; LW = Left wing; RW = Right wing
- † = Joined team via a transaction (e.g., trade, waivers, signing) during the season. Stats reflect time with the Panthers only.
- ‡ = Left team via a transaction (e.g., trade, waivers, release) during the season. Stats reflect time with the Panthers only.

No.	Player	Pos	Regular season					
No.	Player	Pos	GP	G	A	Pts	+/-	PIM
14	Ray Whitney	LW	81	26	38	64	−3	18
44	Rob Niedermayer	C	82	18	33	51	−13	50
25	Viktor Kozlov	C	65	16	35	51	13	24
27	Scott Mellanby	RW	67	18	27	45	5	85
19	Radek Dvorak	RW	82	19	24	43	7	29
21	Mark Parrish	RW	73	24	13	37	−6	25
24	Robert Svehla	D	80	8	29	37	−13	83
11	Bill Lindsay	RW	75	12	15	27	−1	92
16	Oleg Kvasha	LW	68	12	13	25	5	45
29	Johan Garpenlov	LW	64	8	9	17	−9	42
10	Pavel Bure†	RW	11	13	3	16	3	4
55	Ed Jovanovski‡	D	41	3	13	16	−4	82
9	Kirk Muller	LW	82	4	11	15	−11	49
8	Jaroslav Spacek	D	63	3	12	15	15	28
15	Dave Gagner‡	C	36	4	10	14	−7	39
2	Terry Carkner	D	62	2	9	11	0	54
4	Bret Hedican†	D	25	3	7	10	−2	17
3	Paul Laus	D	75	1	9	10	−1	218
28	Peter Worrell	LW	62	4	5	9	0	258
26	Dan Boyle	D	22	3	5	8	0	6
22	Dino Ciccarelli	RW	14	6	1	7	−1	27
5	Gord Murphy	D	51	0	7	7	4	16
7	Rhett Warrener‡	D	48	0	7	7	−1	64
18	Alex Hicks†	LW	51	0	6	6	−4	58
31	Sean Burke	G	59	0	4	4		27
12 (Note: Nilson wore number 10 in his first two games.)	Marcus Nilson	LW	8	1	1	2	2	5
6	Peter Ratchuk	D	24	1	1	2	−1	10
23	Chris Wells	C	20	0	2	2	−4	31
17	Ryan Johnson	C	1	1	0	1	0	0
33	Filip Kuba	D	5	0	1	1	2	0
26	David Nemirovsky‡	RW	2	0	1	1	1	0
15	Jeff Ware†	D	6	0	1	1	−6	6
12	Chris Allen	D	1	0	0	0	1	0
17	Vyacheslav Butsayev‡	C	1	0	0	0	−1	2
12	Dwayne Hay	LW	9	0	0	0	−1	0
15	John Jakopin	D	3	0	0	0	−1	0
1	Kirk McLean	G	30	0	0	0		2
6	Jeff Norton‡	D	3	0	0	0	0	2
37	Herberts Vasiljevs	RW	5	0	0	0	−1	2
17	Steve Washburn‡	C	4	0	0	0	−1	4
7	Mike Wilson†	D	4	0	0	0	2	0

=== Goaltending ===
No.	Player	Regular season									
No.	Player	GP	W	L	T	SA	GA	GAA	SV%	SO	TOI
31	Sean Burke	59	21	24	14	1624	151	2.66	.907	3	3402
1	Kirk McLean	30	9	10	4	727	73	2.74	.900	2	1597

== Awards and records ==
=== Awards ===
Type	Award/honor	Recipient	Ref
League (in-season)	NHL All-Star Game selection	Viktor Kozlov (Note: Kozlov did not play.)	
League (in-season)	NHL Rookie of the Month	Mark Parrish (October)	

=== Milestones ===
Milestone	Player	Date	Ref
First game	Oleg Kvasha	October 9, 1998	
First game	Mark Parrish	October 9, 1998	
First game	Jaroslav Spacek	October 9, 1998	
First game	Peter Ratchuk	December 16, 1998	
First game	Marcus Nilson	January 6, 1999	
First game	Dan Boyle	February 18, 1999	
First game	Filip Kuba	April 9, 1999	
First game	Herberts Vasiljevs	April 9, 1999	
500th game played	Sean Burke	January 18, 1999	

== Draft picks ==
Florida's draft picks at the 1998 NHL entry draft held at the Marine Midland Arena in Buffalo, New York.

Round	#	Player	Nationality	College/Junior/Club team (League)
2	30	Kyle Rossiter	Canada	Spokane Chiefs (WHL)
3	61	Joe DiPenta	Canada	Boston University (Hockey East)
3	63	Lance Ward	Canada	Red Deer Rebels (WHL)
4	89	Ryan Jardine	Canada	Sault Ste. Marie Greyhounds (OHL)
5	117	Jaroslav Spacek	Czech Republic	Färjestads BK (Sweden)
6	148	Chris Ovington	Canada	Red Deer Rebels (WHL)
7	176	B. J. Ketcheson	Canada	Peterborough Petes (OHL)
8	203	Ian Jacobs	Canada	Ottawa 67's (OHL)
9	231	Adrian Wichser	Switzerland	EHC Kloten (Switzerland)
