= 1998–99 New York Islanders season =

NHL hockey team season

1998–99 New York Islanders
- Division: 5th Atlantic
- Conference: 13th Eastern
- 1998–99 record: 24–48–10
- Home record: 11–23–7
- Road record: 13–25–3
- Goals for: 194
- Goals against: 244

Team information
- General manager: Mike Milbury
- Coach: Mike Milbury (Oct.–Jan.); Bill Stewart (Jan.–Apr.)
- Captain: Trevor Linden
- Arena: Nassau Veterans Memorial Coliseum
- Average attendance: 11,299
- Minor league affiliates: Lowell Lock Monsters; Roanoke Express

Team leaders
- Goals: Zigmund Palffy (22)
- Assists: Robert Reichel (37)
- Points: Robert Reichel (56)
- Penalty minutes: Gino Odjick (133)
- Plus/minus: Vladimir Chebaturkin (+6)
- Wins: Tommy Salo (17)
- Goals against average: Tommy Salo (2.62)

The 1998–99 New York Islanders season was the 27th season in the franchise's history. The Islanders had yet another disappointing season and were unable to qualify for the playoffs for the fifth straight year.

== Regular season ==
=== Final standings ===
Atlantic Division
R	CR		GP	W	L	T	GF	GA	Pts
1	1	**New Jersey Devils**	82	47	24	11	248	196	105
2	5	**Philadelphia Flyers**	82	37	26	19	231	196	93
3	8	**Pittsburgh Penguins**	82	38	30	14	242	225	90
4	10	New York Rangers	82	33	38	11	217	227	77
5	13	New York Islanders	82	24	48	10	194	244	58

Eastern Conference
R		Div	GP	W	L	T	GF	GA	Pts
**1**	**y – New Jersey Devils**	**ATL**	**82**	**47**	**24**	**11**	**248**	**196**	**105**
**2**	**y – Ottawa Senators**	**NE**	**82**	**44**	**23**	**15**	**239**	**179**	**103**
**3**	**y – Carolina Hurricanes**	**SE**	**82**	**34**	**30**	**18**	**210**	**202**	**86**
**4**	**Toronto Maple Leafs**	**NE**	**82**	**45**	**30**	**7**	**268**	**231**	**97**
**5**	**Philadelphia Flyers**	**ATL**	**82**	**37**	**26**	**19**	**231**	**196**	**93**
**6**	**Boston Bruins**	**NE**	**82**	**39**	**30**	**13**	**214**	**181**	**91**
**7**	**Buffalo Sabres**	**NE**	**82**	**37**	**28**	**17**	**207**	**175**	**91**
**8**	**Pittsburgh Penguins**	**ATL**	**82**	**38**	**30**	**14**	**242**	**225**	**90**
9	Florida Panthers	SE	82	30	34	18	210	228	78
10	New York Rangers	ATL	82	33	38	11	217	227	77
11	Montreal Canadiens	NE	82	32	39	11	184	209	75
12	Washington Capitals	SE	82	31	45	6	200	218	68
13	New York Islanders	ATL	82	24	48	10	194	244	58
14	Tampa Bay Lightning	SE	82	19	54	9	179	292	47

Divisions: ATL – Atlantic Division, NE – Northeast Division, SE – Southeast Division

bold – Qualified for playoffs; y – Won division

== Schedule and results ==
1998–99 regular season
October: 5–5–0 (home: 3–3–0; road: 2–2–0)

Game	Date	Score	Opponent	Record	Recap
1	October 10, 1998	3–4	Pittsburgh Penguins (1998–99)	0–1–0	L
2	October 12, 1998	0–3	@ Boston Bruins (1998–99)	0–2–0	L
3	October 14, 1998	2–0	@ Tampa Bay Lightning (1998–99)	1–2–0	W
4	October 17, 1998	1–0	@ St. Louis Blues (1998–99)	2–2–0	W
5	October 21, 1998	2–4	Edmonton Oilers (1998–99)	2–3–0	L
6	October 22, 1998	2–3	@ New York Rangers (1998–99)	2–4–0	L
7	October 24, 1998	5–4	Buffalo Sabres (1998–99)	3–4–0	W
8	October 27, 1998	1–0	Los Angeles Kings (1998–99)	4–4–0	W
9	October 29, 1998	1–2	New Jersey Devils (1998–99)	4–5–0	L
10	October 31, 1998	3–2	Philadelphia Flyers (1998–99)	5–5–0	W

November: 5–8–0 (home: 3–3–0; road: 2–5–0)

Game	Date	Score	Opponent	Record	Recap
11	November 2, 1998	6–2	Florida Panthers (1998–99)	6–5–0	W
12	November 5, 1998	3–6	Carolina Hurricanes (1998–99)	6–6–0	L
13	November 7, 1998	2–4	@ Montreal Canadiens (1998–99)	6–7–0	L
14	November 9, 1998	3–1	@ Toronto Maple Leafs (1998–99)	7–7–0	W
15	November 10, 1998	2–3	@ Pittsburgh Penguins (1998–99)	7–8–0	L
16	November 12, 1998	4–0	Montreal Canadiens (1998–99)	8–8–0	W
17	November 14, 1998	3–5	Washington Capitals (1998–99)	8–9–0	L
18	November 17, 1998	2–5	@ Colorado Avalanche (1998–99)	8–10–0	L
19	November 20, 1998	2–4	@ Dallas Stars (1998–99)	8–11–0	L
20	November 21, 1998	6–3	@ Nashville Predators (1998–99)	9–11–0	W
21	November 25, 1998	4–2	Philadelphia Flyers (1998–99)	10–11–0	W
22	November 26, 1998	1–4	@ Ottawa Senators (1998–99)	10–12–0	L
23	November 28, 1998	1–3	Carolina Hurricanes (1998–99)	10–13–0	L

December: 3–9–2 (home: 1–4–1; road: 2–5–1)

Game	Date	Score	Opponent	Record	Recap
24	December 2, 1998	2–3	New York Rangers (1998–99)	10–14–0	L
25	December 4, 1998	1–5	@ Washington Capitals (1998–99)	10–15–0	L
26	December 5, 1998	5–7	New Jersey Devils (1998–99)	10–16–0	L
27	December 8, 1998	1–2	Colorado Avalanche (1998–99)	10–17–0	L
28	December 12, 1998	1–2 OT	Tampa Bay Lightning (1998–99)	10–18–0	L
29	December 15, 1998	1–0	@ San Jose Sharks (1998–99)	11–18–0	W
30	December 17, 1998	5–4 OT	@ Los Angeles Kings (1998–99)	12–18–0	W
31	December 18, 1998	2–2 OT	@ Mighty Ducks of Anaheim (1998–99)	12–18–1	T
32	December 20, 1998	2–4	@ Phoenix Coyotes (1998–99)	12–19–1	L
33	December 22, 1998	3–3 OT	St. Louis Blues (1998–99)	12–19–2	T
34	December 26, 1998	4–2	Boston Bruins (1998–99)	13–19–2	W
35	December 28, 1998	1–5	@ Florida Panthers (1998–99)	13–20–2	L
36	December 29, 1998	0–3	@ Tampa Bay Lightning (1998–99)	13–21–2	L
37	December 31, 1998	0–1	@ Chicago Blackhawks (1998–99)	13–22–2	L

January: 2–8–2 (home: 1–2–2; road: 1–6–0)

Game	Date	Score	Opponent	Record	Recap
38	January 2, 1999	3–4 OT	San Jose Sharks (1998–99)	13–23–2	L
39	January 5, 1999	1–1 OT	Chicago Blackhawks (1998–99)	13–23–3	T
40	January 7, 1999	0–5	@ Philadelphia Flyers (1998–99)	13–24–3	L
41	January 9, 1999	2–3	@ Montreal Canadiens (1998–99)	13–25–3	L
42	January 11, 1999	3–4	@ Washington Capitals (1998–99)	13–26–3	L
43	January 13, 1999	3–4 OT	@ New York Rangers (1998–99)	13–27–3	L
44	January 16, 1999	0–1	@ Florida Panthers (1998–99)	13–28–3	L
45	January 20, 1999	2–5	Florida Panthers (1998–99)	13–29–3	L
46	January 21, 1999	5–2	@ Pittsburgh Penguins (1998–99)	14–29–3	W
47	January 26, 1999	4–1	Boston Bruins (1998–99)	15–29–3	W
48	January 29, 1999	4–4 OT	Phoenix Coyotes (1998–99)	15–29–4	T
49	January 30, 1999	2–9	@ Ottawa Senators (1998–99)	15–30–4	L

February: 4–5–3 (home: 2–3–2; road: 2–2–1)

Game	Date	Score	Opponent	Record	Recap
50	February 3, 1999	1–5	@ Detroit Red Wings (1998–99)	15–31–4	L
51	February 4, 1999	5–4	@ Boston Bruins (1998–99)	16–31–4	W
52	February 7, 1999	3–3 OT	Vancouver Canucks (1998–99)	16–31–5	T
53	February 9, 1999	1–2	Washington Capitals (1998–99)	16–32–5	L
54	February 12, 1999	1–2	Nashville Predators (1998–99)	16–33–5	L
55	February 13, 1999	2–2 OT	@ Buffalo Sabres (1998–99)	16–33–6	T
56	February 15, 1999	3–3 OT	Tampa Bay Lightning (1998–99)	16–33–7	T
57	February 17, 1999	3–1	Pittsburgh Penguins (1998–99)	17–33–7	W
58	February 20, 1999	3–2	@ New Jersey Devils (1998–99)	18–33–7	W
59	February 21, 1999	1–4	@ Carolina Hurricanes (1998–99)	18–34–7	L
60	February 25, 1999	1–4	Toronto Maple Leafs (1998–99)	18–35–7	L
61	February 27, 1999	3–1	Detroit Red Wings (1998–99)	19–35–7	W

March: 2–10–2 (home: 0–6–1; road: 2–4–1)

Game	Date	Score	Opponent	Record	Recap
62	March 2, 1999	2–4	Ottawa Senators (1998–99)	19–36–7	L
63	March 4, 1999	2–3 OT	Dallas Stars (1998–99)	19–37–7	L
64	March 6, 1999	3–3 OT	@ Philadelphia Flyers (1998–99)	19–37–8	T
65	March 7, 1999	2–4	New Jersey Devils (1998–99)	19–38–8	L
66	March 9, 1999	2–2 OT	Philadelphia Flyers (1998–99)	19–38–9	T
67	March 11, 1999	1–2	Toronto Maple Leafs (1998–99)	19–39–9	L
68	March 14, 1999	2–3 OT	New York Rangers (1998–99)	19–40–9	L
69	March 15, 1999	1–2	@ Buffalo Sabres (1998–99)	19–41–9	L
70	March 19, 1999	3–1	@ Vancouver Canucks (1998–99)	20–41–9	W
71	March 21, 1999	1–2	@ Calgary Flames (1998–99)	20–42–9	L
72	March 24, 1999	1–2	@ Carolina Hurricanes (1998–99)	20–43–9	L
73	March 27, 1999	3–7	Ottawa Senators (1998–99)	20–44–9	L
74	March 29, 1999	1–3	@ New York Rangers (1998–99)	20–45–9	L
75	March 31, 1999	5–3	@ Florida Panthers (1998–99)	21–45–9	W

April: 3–3–1 (home: 1–2–1; road: 2–1–0)

Game	Date	Score	Opponent	Record	Recap
76	April 3, 1999	2–2 OT	Mighty Ducks of Anaheim (1998–99)	21–45–10	T
77	April 6, 1999	3–4	Buffalo Sabres (1998–99)	21–46–10	L
78	April 8, 1999	3–1	Montreal Canadiens (1998–99)	22–46–10	W
79	April 10, 1999	1–6	Carolina Hurricanes (1998–99)	22–47–10	L
80	April 12, 1999	4–2	@ New Jersey Devils (1998–99)	23–47–10	W
81	April 14, 1999	2–3 OT	@ Toronto Maple Leafs (1998–99)	23–48–10	L
82	April 17, 1999	7–2	@ Pittsburgh Penguins (1998–99)	24–48–10	W

Legend: W Win (2 points) L Loss (0 points) T Tie (1 point)

== Player statistics ==
=== Scoring ===
- Position abbreviations: C = Center; D = Defense; G = Goaltender; LW = Left wing; RW = Right wing
- † = Joined team via a transaction (e.g., trade, waivers, signing) during the season. Stats reflect time with the Islanders only.
- ‡ = Left team via a transaction (e.g., trade, waivers, release) during the season. Stats reflect time with the Islanders only.

No.	Player	Pos	Regular season					
No.	Player	Pos	GP	G	A	Pts	+/-	PIM
21	Robert Reichel‡	C	70	19	37	56	−15	50
16	Zigmund Palffy	RW	50	22	28	50	−6	34
32	Trevor Linden	RW	82	18	29	47	−14	32
20	Bryan Smolinski	C	82	16	24	40	−7	49
25	Mariusz Czerkawski	RW	78	21	17	38	−10	14
13	Claude Lapointe	C	82	14	23	37	−19	62
44	Mark Lawrence	RW	60	14	16	30	−8	38
29	Kenny Jonsson	D	63	8	18	26	−18	34
12	Mike Watt	LW	75	8	17	25	−2	12
38	Barry Richter	D	72	6	18	24	−4	34
15	Ted Donato†‡	LW	55	7	11	18	−10	27
17	Sergei Nemchinov‡	LW	67	8	8	16	−17	22
34	Bryan Berard‡	D	31	4	11	15	−6	26
4	Eric Brewer	D	63	5	6	11	−14	32
7	Scott Lachance‡	D	59	1	8	9	−19	30
10	Mats Lindgren†	C	12	5	3	8	2	2
3	Zdeno Chara	D	59	2	6	8	−8	83
6	David Harlock	D	70	2	6	8	−16	68
24	Gino Odjick	RW	23	4	3	7	−2	133
11	Kevin Miller	C	33	1	5	6	−5	13
10	Jason Dawe‡	RW	22	2	3	5	0	8
11	Craig Janney†	C	18	1	4	5	−2	4
2	Rich Pilon	D	52	0	4	4	−8	88
14	Joe Sacco	RW	73	3	0	3	−24	45
33	Eric Cairns†	D	9	0	3	3	1	23
33	Ken Belanger‡	LW	9	1	1	2	1	30
36	Ted Crowley†	D	6	1	1	2	0	0
37	Dmitri Nabokov	C	4	0	2	2	4	2
49	Vladimir Orszagh	RW	12	1	0	1	2	6
15	Tom Chorske‡	LW	2	0	1	1	1	2
39	Dean Malkoc	D	2	0	1	1	3	7
55	Vladimir Chebaturkin	D	8	0	0	0	6	12
1 (Note: Cousineau wore number 56 in his first three games.)	Marcel Cousineau	G	6	0	0	0		0
30	Wade Flaherty	G	20	0	0	0		4
18	Mike Hough	LW	11	0	0	0	−2	2
67	Mike Kennedy	C	1	0	0	0	0	2
48	Warren Luhning	RW	11	0	0	0	−4	8
28	Felix Potvin†	G	11	0	0	0		0
35	Tommy Salo‡	G	51	0	0	0		12
36	Ray Schultz	D	4	0	0	0	−2	7
8	Steve Webb	RW	45	0	0	0	−10	32

=== Goaltending ===
- † = Joined team via a transaction (e.g., trade, waivers, signing) during the season. Stats reflect time with the Islanders only.
- ‡ = Left team via a transaction (e.g., trade, waivers, release) during the season. Stats reflect time with the Islanders only.

No.	Player	Regular season									
No.	Player	GP	W	L	T	SA	GA	GAA	SV%	SO	TOI
35	Tommy Salo‡	51	17	26	7	1368	132	2.62	.904	5	3018
30	Wade Flaherty	20	5	11	2	491	53	3.03	.892	0	1048
28	Felix Potvin†	11	2	7	1	345	37	3.66	.893	0	606
1	Marcel Cousineau	6	0	4	0	119	14	2.87	.882	0	293

== Awards and records ==
=== Awards ===
Type	Award/honor	Recipient	Ref
League (in-season)	NHL All-Star Game selection	Kenny Jonsson (Note: Jonsson was injured and did not play.)	
Team	Bob Nystrom Award	Claude Lapointe	

=== Milestones ===
Milestone	Player	Date	Ref
First game	Eric Brewer	October 10, 1998	

== Draft picks ==
New York's draft picks at the 1998 NHL entry draft held at the Marine Midland Arena in Buffalo, New York.

Round	#	Player	Nationality	College/Junior/Club team (League)
1	9	Mike Rupp	United States	Erie Otters (OHL)
2	36	Chris Nielsen	Canada	Calgary Hitmen (WHL)
4	95	Andy Burnham	Canada	Windsor Spitfires (OHL)
5	123	Jiri Dopita	Czech Republic	Petra Vsetín (Czech Republic)
6	155	Kevin Clauson	United States	Western Michigan University (CCHA)
7	182	Evgeny Korolev	Russia	London Knights (OHL)
8	209	Frederick Brind'Amour	Canada	Sherbrooke Faucons (QMJHL)
9	237	Ben Blais	United States	Walpole High School (USHS-MA)
9	242	Jason Doyle	Canada	Sault Ste. Marie Greyhounds (OHL)
9	250	Radek Matejovsky	Czech Republic	Slavia Prague (Czech Republic)
