= 1998–99 Boston Bruins season =

NHL team season

1998–99 Boston Bruins
- Division: 3rd Northeast
- Conference: 6th Eastern
- 1998–99 record: 39–30–13
- Home record: 22–10–9
- Road record: 17–20–4
- Goals for: 214
- Goals against: 181

Team information
- General manager: Harry Sinden
- Coach: Pat Burns
- Captain: Ray Bourque
- Arena: Fleet Center
- Average attendance: 16,299 (91.3%); Total: 668,290
- Minor league affiliate: Providence Bruins (AHL)

Team leaders
- Goals: Dmitri Khristich (29)
- Assists: Jason Allison (53)
- Points: Jason Allison (76)
- Penalty minutes: Ken Belanger (152)
- Plus/minus: Don Sweeney (+14)
- Wins: Byron Dafoe (32)
- Goals against average: Byron Dafoe (2.00)

The 1998–99 Boston Bruins season was the teams' 75th season.

== Regular season ==
The Bruins' 11 shutouts were the most among all 27 teams. The Bruins also scored the fewest short-handed goals (3), allowed the fewest power-play goals (33) and had the best penalty-kill percentage (89.18%)

=== Final standings ===
Northeast Division
R	CR		GP	W	L	T	GF	GA	PIM	Pts
1	2	**Ottawa Senators**	82	44	23	15	239	179	892	103
2	4	**Toronto Maple Leafs**	82	45	30	7	268	231	1095	97
3	6	**Boston Bruins**	82	39	30	13	214	181	1182	91
4	7	**Buffalo Sabres**	82	37	28	17	207	175	1561	91
5	11	Montreal Canadiens	82	32	39	11	184	209	1299	75

Note: CR = Conference rank; GP = Games played; W = Wins; L = Losses; T = Ties; GF = Goals for; GA = Goals against; Pts = Points
Bolded teams qualified for the playoffs.

Eastern Conference
R		Div	GP	W	L	T	GF	GA	Pts
**1**	**y – New Jersey Devils**	**ATL**	**82**	**47**	**24**	**11**	**248**	**196**	**105**
**2**	**y – Ottawa Senators**	**NE**	**82**	**44**	**23**	**15**	**239**	**179**	**103**
**3**	**y – Carolina Hurricanes**	**SE**	**82**	**34**	**30**	**18**	**210**	**202**	**86**
**4**	**Toronto Maple Leafs**	**NE**	**82**	**45**	**30**	**7**	**268**	**231**	**97**
**5**	**Philadelphia Flyers**	**ATL**	**82**	**37**	**26**	**19**	**231**	**196**	**93**
**6**	**Boston Bruins**	**NE**	**82**	**39**	**30**	**13**	**214**	**181**	**91**
**7**	**Buffalo Sabres**	**NE**	**82**	**37**	**28**	**17**	**207**	**175**	**91**
**8**	**Pittsburgh Penguins**	**ATL**	**82**	**38**	**30**	**14**	**242**	**225**	**90**
9	Florida Panthers	SE	82	30	34	18	210	228	78
10	New York Rangers	ATL	82	33	38	11	217	227	77
11	Montreal Canadiens	NE	82	32	39	11	184	209	75
12	Washington Capitals	SE	82	31	45	6	200	218	68
13	New York Islanders	ATL	82	24	48	10	194	244	58
14	Tampa Bay Lightning	SE	82	19	54	9	179	292	47

Divisions: ATL – Atlantic Division, NE – Northeast Division, SE – Southeast Division

bold – Qualified for playoffs; y – Won division

== Schedule and results ==
=== Regular season ===
1998–99 regular season
October: 4–5–2 (home: 1–1–2; road: 3–4–0)

Game	Date	Score	Opponent	Record	Recap
1	October 10, 1998	3–3 OT	St. Louis Blues (1998–99)	0–0–1	T
2	October 12, 1998	3–0	New York Islanders (1998–99)	1–0–1	W
3	October 14, 1998	3–0	@ Colorado Avalanche (1998–99)	2–0–1	W
4	October 16, 1998	1–2 OT	@ Los Angeles Kings (1998–99)	2–1–1	L
5	October 18, 1998	3–0	@ San Jose Sharks (1998–99)	3–1–1	W
6	October 19, 1998	1–3	@ Phoenix Coyotes (1998–99)	3–2–1	L
7	October 21, 1998	0–3	@ Mighty Ducks of Anaheim (1998–99)	3–3–1	L
8	October 24, 1998	1–3	@ New Jersey Devils (1998–99)	3–4–1	L
9	October 28, 1998	9–2	@ Montreal Canadiens (1998–99)	4–4–1	W
10	October 29, 1998	1–1 OT	Montreal Canadiens (1998–99)	4–4–2	T
11	October 31, 1998	0–2	Carolina Hurricanes (1998–99)	4–5–2	L

November: 6–2–3 (home: 3–1–1; road: 3–1–2)

Game	Date	Score	Opponent	Record	Recap
12	November 3, 1998	2–4	@ Buffalo Sabres (1998–99)	4–6–2	L
13	November 5, 1998	4–1	Toronto Maple Leafs (1998–99)	5–6–2	W
14	November 7, 1998	0–0 OT	@ Pittsburgh Penguins (1998–99)	5–6–3	T
15	November 8, 1998	5–2	@ Carolina Hurricanes (1998–99)	6–6–3	W
16	November 13, 1998	3–3 OT	@ New York Rangers (1998–99)	6–6–4	T
17	November 14, 1998	1–3	Dallas Stars (1998–99)	6–7–4	L
18	November 19, 1998	5–5 OT	Florida Panthers (1998–99)	6–7–5	T
19	November 21, 1998	5–4 OT	Washington Capitals (1998–99)	7–7–5	W
20	November 24, 1998	4–1	@ Tampa Bay Lightning (1998–99)	8–7–5	W
21	November 25, 1998	1–0	@ Florida Panthers (1998–99)	9–7–5	W
22	November 27, 1998	5–1	Montreal Canadiens (1998–99)	10–7–5	W

December: 6–6–1 (home: 4–2–1; road: 2–4–0)

Game	Date	Score	Opponent	Record	Recap
23	December 1, 1998	1–1 OT	Vancouver Canucks (1998–99)	10–7–6	T
24	December 5, 1998	2–1	Pittsburgh Penguins (1998–99)	11–7–6	W
25	December 10, 1998	3–2	@ Carolina Hurricanes (1998–99)	12–7–6	W
26	December 12, 1998	1–4	Buffalo Sabres (1998–99)	12–8–6	L
27	December 16, 1998	3–5	@ Detroit Red Wings (1998–99)	12–9–6	L
28	December 17, 1998	5–2	Ottawa Senators (1998–99)	13–9–6	W
29	December 19, 1998	4–1	Detroit Red Wings (1998–99)	14–9–6	W
30	December 21, 1998	3–2	Tampa Bay Lightning (1998–99)	15–9–6	W
31	December 23, 1998	1–2	Philadelphia Flyers (1998–99)	15–10–6	L
32	December 26, 1998	2–4	@ New York Islanders (1998–99)	15–11–6	L
33	December 28, 1998	1–5	@ Washington Capitals (1998–99)	15–12–6	L
34	December 30, 1998	5–2	@ Nashville Predators (1998–99)	16–12–6	W
35	December 31, 1998	1–6	@ Dallas Stars (1998–99)	16–13–6	L

January: 4–6–2 (home: 4–2–2; road: 0–4–0)

Game	Date	Score	Opponent	Record	Recap
36	January 2, 1999	2–1	Mighty Ducks of Anaheim (1998–99)	17–13–6	W
37	January 4, 1999	5–1	Calgary Flames (1998–99)	18–13–6	W
38	January 7, 1999	2–1	Toronto Maple Leafs (1998–99)	19–13–6	W
39	January 9, 1999	3–6	@ Toronto Maple Leafs (1998–99)	19–14–6	L
40	January 15, 1999	1–2	@ Buffalo Sabres (1998–99)	19–15–6	L
41	January 16, 1999	2–2 OT	Tampa Bay Lightning (1998–99)	19–15–7	T
42	January 18, 1999	8–1	Nashville Predators (1998–99)	20–15–7	W
43	January 21, 1999	1–3	Ottawa Senators (1998–99)	20–16–7	L
44	January 26, 1999	1–4	@ New York Islanders (1998–99)	20–17–7	L
45	January 28, 1999	0–2	New Jersey Devils (1998–99)	20–18–7	L
46	January 30, 1999	2–5	@ Pittsburgh Penguins (1998–99)	20–19–7	L
47	January 31, 1999	0–0 OT	Carolina Hurricanes (1998–99)	20–19–8	T

February: 5–5–2 (home: 3–2–1; road: 2–3–1)

Game	Date	Score	Opponent	Record	Recap
48	February 2, 1999	2–3	Colorado Avalanche (1998–99)	20–20–8	L
49	February 4, 1999	4–5	New York Islanders (1998–99)	20–21–8	L
50	February 6, 1999	2–2 OT	@ Philadelphia Flyers (1998–99)	20–21–9	T
51	February 7, 1999	3–2	New York Rangers (1998–99)	21–21–9	W
52	February 9, 1999	2–0	@ Edmonton Oilers (1998–99)	22–21–9	W
53	February 12, 1999	3–4	@ Calgary Flames (1998–99)	22–22–9	L
54	February 13, 1999	1–3	@ Vancouver Canucks (1998–99)	22–23–9	L
55	February 18, 1999	0–2	@ Ottawa Senators (1998–99)	22–24–9	L
56	February 21, 1999	6–3	@ Chicago Blackhawks (1998–99)	23–24–9	W
57	February 23, 1999	5–2	Ottawa Senators (1998–99)	24–24–9	W
58	February 25, 1999	3–3 OT	New Jersey Devils (1998–99)	24–24–10	T
59	February 27, 1999	4–3	Washington Capitals (1998–99)	25–24–10	W

March: 7–4–3 (home: 2–2–2; road: 5–2–1)

Game	Date	Score	Opponent	Record	Recap
60	March 2, 1999	3–2	Phoenix Coyotes (1998–99)	26–24–10	W
61	March 3, 1999	1–2	@ Carolina Hurricanes (1998–99)	26–25–10	L
62	March 5, 1999	4–1	@ New Jersey Devils (1998–99)	27–25–10	W
63	March 7, 1999	1–3	New York Rangers (1998–99)	27–26–10	L
64	March 9, 1999	2–0	Florida Panthers (1998–99)	28–26–10	W
65	March 12, 1999	5–4	@ New York Rangers (1998–99)	29–26–10	W
66	March 13, 1999	1–3	@ Buffalo Sabres (1998–99)	29–27–10	L
67	March 17, 1999	4–1	@ Toronto Maple Leafs (1998–99)	30–27–10	W
68	March 20, 1999	2–2 OT	San Jose Sharks (1998–99)	30–27–11	T
69	March 21, 1999	4–1	@ Washington Capitals (1998–99)	31–27–11	W
70	March 24, 1999	3–0	@ Ottawa Senators (1998–99)	32–27–11	W
71	March 25, 1999	3–3 OT	Chicago Blackhawks (1998–99)	32–27–12	T
72	March 27, 1999	2–2 OT	@ Toronto Maple Leafs (1998–99)	32–27–13	T
73	March 30, 1999	1–2 OT	Los Angeles Kings (1998–99)	32–28–13	L

April: 7–2–0 (home: 5–0–0; road: 2–2–0)

Game	Date	Score	Opponent	Record	Recap
74	April 1, 1999	3–2	@ Montreal Canadiens (1998–99)	33–28–13	W
75	April 3, 1999	3–0	Philadelphia Flyers (1998–99)	34–28–13	W
76	April 5, 1999	3–0	Montreal Canadiens (1998–99)	35–28–13	W
77	April 7, 1999	5–2	@ Florida Panthers (1998–99)	36–28–13	W
78	April 8, 1999	0–3	@ Tampa Bay Lightning (1998–99)	36–29–13	L
79	April 10, 1999	3–2	Tampa Bay Lightning (1998–99)	37–29–13	W
80	April 15, 1999	4–2	Pittsburgh Penguins (1998–99)	38–29–13	W
81	April 17, 1999	2–1 OT	Buffalo Sabres (1998–99)	39–29–13	W
82	April 18, 1999	1–3	@ Philadelphia Flyers (1998–99)	39–30–13	L

Legend: W Win (2 points) L Loss (0 points) T Tie (1 point)

=== Playoffs ===
1999 Stanley Cup playoffs
Eastern Conference Quarterfinals vs. (3) Carolina Hurricanes – Bruins win 4–2

Game	Date	Score	Opponent	Series	Recap
1	April 22, 1999	2–0	@ Carolina Hurricanes	Bruins lead 1–0	W
2	April 24, 1999	2–3 OT	@ Carolina Hurricanes	Series tied 1–1	L
3	April 26, 1999	2–3	Carolina Hurricanes	Hurricanes lead 2–1	L
4	April 28, 1999	4–1	Carolina Hurricanes	Series tied 2–2	W
5	April 30, 1999	4–3 2OT	@ Carolina Hurricanes	Bruins lead 3–2	W
6	May 2, 1999	2–0	Carolina Hurricanes	Bruins win 4–2	W

Eastern Conference Semifinals vs. (7) Buffalo Sabres – Sabres win 4–2

Game	Date	Score	Opponent	Series	Recap
1	May 6, 1999	4–2	Buffalo Sabres	Bruins lead 1–0	W
2	May 9, 1999	1–3	Buffalo Sabres	Series tied 1–1	L
3	May 12, 1999	2–3	@ Buffalo Sabres	Sabres lead 2–1	L
4	May 14, 1999	0–3	@ Buffalo Sabres	Sabres lead 3–1	L
5	May 16, 1999	5–3	Buffalo Sabres	Sabres lead 3–2	W
6	May 18, 1999	2–3	@ Buffalo Sabres	Sabres win 4–2	L

Legend: W Win L Loss

== Player statistics ==
=== Scoring ===
- Position abbreviations: C = Center; D = Defense; G = Goaltender; LW = Left wing; RW = Right wing
- † = Joined team via a transaction (e.g., trade, waivers, signing) during the season. Stats reflect time with the Bruins only.
- ‡ = Left team via a transaction (e.g., trade, waivers, release) during the season. Stats reflect time with the Bruins only.

No.	Player	Pos	Regular season						Playoffs					
No.	Player	Pos	GP	G	A	Pts	+/-	PIM	GP	G	A	Pts	+/-	PIM
41	Jason Allison	C	82	23	53	76	5	68	12	2	9	11	1	6
12	Dmitri Khristich	LW	79	29	42	71	11	48	12	3	4	7	1	6
77	Ray Bourque	D	81	10	47	57	−7	34	12	1	9	10	1	14
14	Sergei Samsonov	LW	79	25	26	51	−6	18	11	3	1	4	3	0
6	Joe Thornton	C	81	16	25	41	3	69	11	3	6	9	1	4
33	Anson Carter	C	55	24	16	40	7	22	12	4	3	7	−3	0
23	Steve Heinze	RW	73	22	18	40	7	30	12	4	3	7	−1	0
18	Kyle McLaren	D	52	6	18	24	1	48	12	0	3	3	4	10
19	Rob DiMaio	C	71	7	14	21	−14	95	12	2	0	2	2	8
20	Darren Van Impe	D	60	5	15	20	−5	66	11	1	2	3	−3	4
11	P. J. Axelsson	LW	77	7	10	17	−14	18	12	1	1	2	−1	4
42	Peter Ferraro	C	46	6	8	14	10	44	—	—	—	—	—	—
36	Grant Ledyard	D	47	4	8	12	−8	33	2	0	0	0	−1	2
32	Don Sweeney	D	81	2	10	12	14	64	11	3	0	3	2	6
26	Tim Taylor	C	49	4	7	11	−10	55	12	0	3	3	1	8
25	Hal Gill	D	80	3	7	10	−10	63	12	0	0	0	−1	14
17	Shawn Bates	C	33	5	4	9	3	2	12	0	0	0	−1	4
38 (Note: Taylor wore number 50 through November 14.)	Chris Taylor	C	37	3	5	8	−3	12	—	—	—	—	—	—
10	Cameron Mann	RW	33	5	2	7	0	17	1	0	0	0	0	0
27	Landon Wilson	RW	22	3	3	6	0	17	—	—	—	—	—	—
44	Dave Ellett	D	54	0	6	6	11	25	8	0	0	0	0	4
37	Mattias Timander	D	22	0	6	6	4	10	4	1	1	2	3	2
16	Ken Belanger†	LW	45	1	4	5	−2	152	12	1	0	1	2	16
22	Ken Baumgartner	LW	69	1	3	4	−6	119	3	0	0	0	0	0
21	Ted Donato‡	LW	14	1	3	4	0	4	—	—	—	—	—	—
57	Antti Laaksonen	LW	11	1	2	3	−1	2	—	—	—	—	—	—
34	Byron Dafoe	G	68	0	2	2		25	12	0	0	0		2
21	Randy Robitaille	C	4	0	2	2	−1	0	1	0	0	0	0	0
28 (Note: Savage wore number 54 in his first two games.)	Andre Savage	C	6	1	0	1	2	0	—	—	—	—	—	—
55	Jonathan Girard	D	3	0	0	0	1	0	—	—	—	—	—	—
51	Jay Henderson	LW	4	0	0	0	−1	2	—	—	—	—	—	—
61	Marquis Mathieu†	C	9	0	0	0	−1	8	—	—	—	—	—	—
72	Eric Nickulas	C	2	0	0	0	0	0	1	0	0	0	0	2
56	Peter Nordstrom	C	2	0	0	0	−1	0	—	—	—	—	—	—
53	Brandon Smith	D	5	0	0	0	2	0	—	—	—	—	—	—
35	Robbie Tallas	G	17	0	0	0		0	—	—	—	—	—	—
29	Dennis Vaske	D	3	0	0	0	−3	6	—	—	—	—	—	—
71	Terry Virtue	D	4	0	0	0	2	0	—	—	—	—	—	—

=== Goaltending ===
No.	Player	Regular season											Playoffs									
No.	Player	GP	GS	W	L	T	SA	GA	GAA	SV%	SO	TOI	GP	GS	W	L	SA	GA	GAA	SV%	SO	TOI
34	Byron Dafoe	68	67	32	23	11	1,800	133	2.00	.926	10	4,001:17	12	12	6	6	330	26	1.98	.921	2	767:58
35	Robbie Tallas	17	15	7	7	2	421	43	2.61	.898	1	986:53	—	—	—	—	—	—	—	—	—	—

== Awards and records ==
=== Awards ===
Type	Award/honor	Recipient	Ref
League (annual)	Lester Patrick Trophy	Harry Sinden	
League (annual)	NHL Second All-Star Team	Ray Bourque (Defense)	
League (annual)	NHL Second All-Star Team	Byron Dafoe (Goaltender)	
League (in-season)	NHL All-Star Game selection	Ray Bourque (Note: Bourque was voted to the starting lineup.)	
League (in-season)	NHL All-Star Game selection	Dmitri Khristich	
League (in-season)	NHL Player of the Month	Byron Dafoe (April)	
League (in-season)	NHL Player of the Week	Ray Bourque (December 21)	
Team	Elizabeth C. Dufresne Trophy	Byron Dafoe	
Team	Seventh Player Award	Byron Dafoe	
Team	Three Stars Awards	Byron Dafoe (1st)	
Team	Three Stars Awards	Ray Bourque (2nd)	
Team	Three Stars Awards	Jason Allison (3rd)	

=== Milestones ===
Milestone	Player	Date	Ref
First game	Antti Laaksonen	October 10, 1998	
First game	Peter Nordstrom	October 10, 1998	
First game	Jonathan Girard	October 18, 1998	
First game	Jay Henderson	October 28, 1998	
First game	Marquis Mathieu	October 28, 1998	
First game	Eric Nickulas	January 7, 1999	
First game	Andre Savage	January 7, 1999	
First game	Brandon Smith	January 9, 1999	
First game	Terry Virtue	January 16, 1999	

== Transactions ==
=== Trades ===
Date	Details	
June 27, 1998	To New York Islanders 1998 9th-round pick (#250 overall)	To Boston Bruins 1999 9th-round pick (#247 overall)
November 7, 1998	To New York Islanders Ted Donato	To Boston Bruins Ken Belanger

=== Free agents ===
Date	Player	Team	Contract term
July 14, 1998	Anders Myrvold	to Djurgårdens IF (Elitserien)	
July 14, 1998	P. C. Drouin	to Bracknell Bees (BISL)	
July 21, 1998	Peter Ferraro	from New York Rangers	1-year
July 22, 1998	Brandon Smith	from Detroit Red Wings	1-year
July 22, 1998	Chris Taylor	from Los Angeles Kings	1-year
July 23, 1998	Jon Rohloff	to San Jose Sharks	
August 17, 1998	Barry Richter	to New York Islanders	
August 19, 1998	Dean Malkoc	to New York Islanders	
August 28, 1998	Terry Virtue	from St. Louis Blues	
September 10, 1998	Dennis Vaske	from New York Islanders	1-year with a 1-year option
September 14, 1998	Guy Larose	to Chicago Wolves (IHL)	
October 9, 1998	Trent McCleary	to Montreal Canadiens	1-year

=== Signings ===
Date	Player	Contract term
July 7, 1998	Peter Nordstrom	1-year
September 9, 1998	Aaron Downey	1-year
September 9, 1998	Ray Bourque	2-year (voiding current contract)
September 10, 1998	Eric Nickulas	2-year
September 13, 1998	Steve Heinze	2-year
September 25, 1998	Jonathan Girard	3-year
October 1, 1998	Jason Allison	2-year
October 1, 1998	Ted Donato	1-year
October 26, 1998	Marquis Mathieu	
November 5, 1998	Anson Carter	2-year
November 10, 1998	Kyle McLaren	3-year

=== Waivers ===
Date	Player	Team
October 5, 1999	Rory Fitzpatrick	from St. Louis Blues in Waiver Draft
October 7, 1999	Rory Fitzpatrick	to St. Louis Blues

== Draft picks ==
Boston's draft picks at the 1998 NHL entry draft held at the Marine Midland Arena in Buffalo, New York.

Round	#	Player	Position	Nationality	College/Junior/Club team (League)
2	48	Jonathan Girard	D	Canada	Laval Titan Collège Français (QMJHL)
2^{1}	52	Bobby Allen	D	United States	Boston College (Hockey East)
3	78	Peter Nordstrom	LW	Sweden	Färjestad BK (Sweden)
5	135	Andrew Raycroft	G	Canada	Sudbury Wolves (OHL)
6	165	Ryan Milanovic	LW	Canada	Kitchener Rangers (OHL)

Notes

1. The Bruins acquired this pick as the result of a trade on March 1, 1997 that sent Bill Ranford, Adam Oates and Rick Tocchet to Washington in exchange for Jason Allison, Jim Carey, Anson Carter, a third-round pick in 1997 and this pick (being conditional at the time of the trade).
- The Bruins first-round pick went to the Colorado Avalanche as the result of a trade on November 22, 1996 that sent Landon Wilson and Anders Myrvold to Boston in exchange for this pick (19th overall).
- The Bruins fourth-round pick went to the New Jersey Devils as the result of a trade on June 18, 1998 that sent Doug Bodger to Los Angeles in exchange for this pick (105th overall).

Los Angeles previously acquired this pick as the result of a trade on August 29, 1997 that sent Byron Dafoe and Dmitri Khristich to Boston in exchange for Jozef Stumpel, Sandy Moger and this pick.

- The Bruins seventh-round pick went to the Calgary Flames as the result of a trade on June 21, 1997 that sent Mike Sullivan to Boston in exchange for this pick (192nd overall).
- The Bruins eighth-round pick went to the Vancouver Canucks as the result of a trade on March 3, 1998 that sent Grant Ledyard to Boston in exchange for this pick (219th overall).
- The Bruins ninth-round pick went to the New York Islanders as the result of a trade on June 27, 1998 that sent and ninth-round pick in 1999 to Boston in exchange for this pick (250th overall).
