= 1998–99 Montreal Canadiens season =

NHL hockey team season

1998–99 Montreal Canadiens
- Division: 5th Northeast
- Conference: 11th Eastern
- 1998–99 record: 32–39–11
- Home record: 21–15–5
- Road record: 11–24–6
- Goals for: 184
- Goals against: 209

Team information
- General manager: Rejean Houle
- Coach: Alain Vigneault
- Captain: Vincent Damphousse (Oct.–Mar.); Vacant (Mar.–Apr.)
- Arena: Molson Centre
- Average attendance: 20,740 (97.5%)
- Minor league affiliates: Quebec Citadelles; New Orleans Brass

Team leaders
- Goals: Martin Rucinsky (17)
- Assists: Mark Recchi (35)
- Points: Mark Recchi (47)
- Penalty minutes: Shayne Corson (147)
- Plus/minus: Patrick Poulin; Turner Stevenson (+6)
- Wins: Jeff Hackett (24)
- Goals against average: Frederic Chabot (2.23)

The 1998–99 Montreal Canadiens season was the club's 90th season of play. The club finished fifth in the Northeast Division and did not qualify for the 1999 Stanley Cup playoffs for the first time since the 1994–95 season. It had been the worst season in over 48 years for the club. The Canadiens finished last in their division for the first time since the 1939–40 season. Martin Rucinsky led the club in goals scored throughout the season with only a measly 17 in total. It was the first time since the 1940–41 season that the Canadiens did not have at least one 20-goal scorer. On March 31, 1999, ownership announced it has lost $3.8 million in its last fiscal year. Following the season, team president Ronald Corey resigned in May 1999.

== Regular season ==
In March 1999, captain Vincent Damphousse was traded to the San Jose Sharks.

=== Final standings ===
Northeast Division
R	CR		GP	W	L	T	GF	GA	PIM	Pts
1	2	**Ottawa Senators**	82	44	23	15	239	179	892	103
2	4	**Toronto Maple Leafs**	82	45	30	7	268	231	1095	97
3	6	**Boston Bruins**	82	39	30	13	214	181	1182	91
4	7	**Buffalo Sabres**	82	37	28	17	207	175	1561	91
5	11	Montreal Canadiens	82	32	39	11	184	209	1299	75

Note: CR = Conference rank; GP = Games played; W = Wins; L = Losses; T = Ties; GF = Goals for; GA = Goals against; Pts = Points
Bolded teams qualified for the playoffs.

Eastern Conference
R		Div	GP	W	L	T	GF	GA	Pts
**1**	**y – New Jersey Devils**	**ATL**	**82**	**47**	**24**	**11**	**248**	**196**	**105**
**2**	**y – Ottawa Senators**	**NE**	**82**	**44**	**23**	**15**	**239**	**179**	**103**
**3**	**y – Carolina Hurricanes**	**SE**	**82**	**34**	**30**	**18**	**210**	**202**	**86**
**4**	**Toronto Maple Leafs**	**NE**	**82**	**45**	**30**	**7**	**268**	**231**	**97**
**5**	**Philadelphia Flyers**	**ATL**	**82**	**37**	**26**	**19**	**231**	**196**	**93**
**6**	**Boston Bruins**	**NE**	**82**	**39**	**30**	**13**	**214**	**181**	**91**
**7**	**Buffalo Sabres**	**NE**	**82**	**37**	**28**	**17**	**207**	**175**	**91**
**8**	**Pittsburgh Penguins**	**ATL**	**82**	**38**	**30**	**14**	**242**	**225**	**90**
9	Florida Panthers	SE	82	30	34	18	210	228	78
10	New York Rangers	ATL	82	33	38	11	217	227	77
11	Montreal Canadiens	NE	82	32	39	11	184	209	75
12	Washington Capitals	SE	82	31	45	6	200	218	68
13	New York Islanders	ATL	82	24	48	10	194	244	58
14	Tampa Bay Lightning	SE	82	19	54	9	179	292	47

Divisions: ATL – Atlantic Division, NE – Northeast Division, SE – Southeast Division

bold – Qualified for playoffs; y – Won division

== Schedule and results ==
1998–99 regular season
October: 3–5–2 (home: 3–4–0; road: 0–1–2)

Game	Date	Score	Opponent	Record	Recap
1	October 10, 1998	7–1	New York Rangers (1998–99)	1–0–0	W
2	October 13, 1998	1–0	Mighty Ducks of Anaheim (1998–99)	2–0–0	W
3	October 16, 1998	2–2 OT	@ Washington Capitals (1998–99)	2–0–1	T
4	October 17, 1998	3–4	Buffalo Sabres (1998–99)	2–1–1	L
5	October 19, 1998	1–2	Chicago Blackhawks (1998–99)	2–2–1	L
6	October 21, 1998	3–2	Ottawa Senators (1998–99)	3–2–1	W
7	October 24, 1998	0–3	Detroit Red Wings (1998–99)	3–3–1	L
8	October 28, 1998	2–9	Boston Bruins (1998–99)	3–4–1	L
9	October 29, 1998	1–1 OT	@ Boston Bruins (1998–99)	3–4–2	T
10	October 31, 1998	1–5	@ Ottawa Senators (1998–99)	3–5–2	L

November: 5–7–0 (home: 4–3–0; road: 1–4–0)

Game	Date	Score	Opponent	Record	Recap
11	November 4, 1998	4–1	@ New York Rangers (1998–99)	4–5–2	W
12	November 7, 1998	4–2	New York Islanders (1998–99)	5–5–2	W
13	November 9, 1998	5–1	Philadelphia Flyers (1998–99)	6–5–2	W
14	November 11, 1998	0–3	@ New Jersey Devils (1998–99)	6–6–2	L
15	November 12, 1998	0–4	@ New York Islanders (1998–99)	6–7–2	L
16	November 14, 1998	1–4	Edmonton Oilers (1998–99)	6–8–2	L
17	November 17, 1998	4–5	@ Carolina Hurricanes (1998–99)	6–9–2	L
18	November 19, 1998	4–3	Calgary Flames (1998–99)	7–9–2	W
19	November 21, 1998	2–3	Colorado Avalanche (1998–99)	7–10–2	L
20	November 27, 1998	1–5	@ Boston Bruins (1998–99)	7–11–2	L
21	November 28, 1998	3–4	Pittsburgh Penguins (1998–99)	7–12–2	L
22	November 30, 1998	3–1	Los Angeles Kings (1998–99)	8–12–2	W

December: 3–6–5 (home: 0–1–3; road: 3–5–2)

Game	Date	Score	Opponent	Record	Recap
23	December 2, 1998	1–4	@ Carolina Hurricanes (1998–99)	8–13–2	L
24	December 4, 1998	1–1 OT	@ New Jersey Devils (1998–99)	8–13–3	T
25	December 5, 1998	3–4 OT	Toronto Maple Leafs (1998–99)	8–14–3	L
26	December 9, 1998	2–4	@ Phoenix Coyotes (1998–99)	8–15–3	L
27	December 11, 1998	2–3	@ Dallas Stars (1998–99)	8–16–3	L
28	December 12, 1998	2–2 OT	@ Nashville Predators (1998–99)	8–16–4	T
29	December 14, 1998	2–2 OT	Phoenix Coyotes (1998–99)	8–16–5	T
30	December 18, 1998	2–4	@ Buffalo Sabres (1998–99)	8–17–5	L
31	December 19, 1998	1–1 OT	New Jersey Devils (1998–99)	8–17–6	T
32	December 21, 1998	2–2 OT	Dallas Stars (1998–99)	8–17–7	T
33	December 23, 1998	1–3	@ Ottawa Senators (1998–99)	8–18–7	L
34	December 26, 1998	2–1	@ Toronto Maple Leafs (1998–99)	9–18–7	W
35	December 29, 1998	5–2	@ Edmonton Oilers (1998–99)	10–18–7	W
36	December 31, 1998	2–1	@ Calgary Flames (1998–99)	11–18–7	W

January: 7–6–1 (home: 4–2–1; road: 3–4–0)

Game	Date	Score	Opponent	Record	Recap
37	January 2, 1999	2–1	@ Vancouver Canucks (1998–99)	12–18–7	W
38	January 4, 1999	3–4	@ Colorado Avalanche (1998–99)	12–19–7	L
39	January 7, 1999	4–1	Tampa Bay Lightning (1998–99)	13–19–7	W
40	January 9, 1999	3–2	New York Islanders (1998–99)	14–19–7	W
41	January 11, 1999	3–1	St. Louis Blues (1998–99)	15–19–7	W
42	January 12, 1999	1–5	@ Detroit Red Wings (1998–99)	15–20–7	L
43	January 15, 1999	3–0	@ Washington Capitals (1998–99)	16–20–7	W
44	January 16, 1999	3–0	New York Rangers (1998–99)	17–20–7	W
45	January 18, 1999	4–4 OT	Washington Capitals (1998–99)	17–20–8	T
46	January 21, 1999	0–3	@ Chicago Blackhawks (1998–99)	17–21–8	L
47	January 26, 1999	2–1	@ Tampa Bay Lightning (1998–99)	18–21–8	W
48	January 27, 1999	1–2	@ Florida Panthers (1998–99)	18–22–8	L
49	January 30, 1999	1–3	Carolina Hurricanes (1998–99)	18–23–8	L
50	January 31, 1999	3–5	Pittsburgh Penguins (1998–99)	18–24–8	L

February: 6–5–0 (home: 4–0–0; road: 2–5–0)

Game	Date	Score	Opponent	Record	Recap
51	February 3, 1999	2–1	Vancouver Canucks (1998–99)	19–24–8	W
52	February 4, 1999	2–5	@ Philadelphia Flyers (1998–99)	19–25–8	L
53	February 6, 1999	3–2	Buffalo Sabres (1998–99)	20–25–8	W
54	February 9, 1999	2–3 OT	@ Pittsburgh Penguins (1998–99)	20–26–8	L
55	February 11, 1999	2–5	@ Buffalo Sabres (1998–99)	20–27–8	L
56	February 13, 1999	4–0	Florida Panthers (1998–99)	21–27–8	W
57	February 17, 1999	6–3	@ New York Rangers (1998–99)	22–27–8	W
58	February 18, 1999	3–1	@ Philadelphia Flyers (1998–99)	23–27–8	W
59	February 20, 1999	2–3 OT	@ Toronto Maple Leafs (1998–99)	23–28–8	L
60	February 25, 1999	1–3	@ Ottawa Senators (1998–99)	23–29–8	L
61	February 27, 1999	4–1	Ottawa Senators (1998–99)	24–29–8	W

March: 5–5–2 (home: 3–3–1; road: 2–2–1)

Game	Date	Score	Opponent	Record	Recap
62	March 2, 1999	4–1	Philadelphia Flyers (1998–99)	25–29–8	W
63	March 3, 1999	4–4 OT	@ Pittsburgh Penguins (1998–99)	25–29–9	T
64	March 6, 1999	1–6	Tampa Bay Lightning (1998–99)	25–30–9	L
65	March 8, 1999	2–5	Florida Panthers (1998–99)	25–31–9	L
66	March 11, 1999	3–0	@ St. Louis Blues (1998–99)	26–31–9	W
67	March 13, 1999	2–1	Toronto Maple Leafs (1998–99)	27–31–9	W
68	March 18, 1999	3–2	Nashville Predators (1998–99)	28–31–9	W
69	March 20, 1999	0–1	Washington Capitals (1998–99)	28–32–9	L
70	March 22, 1999	1–1 OT	San Jose Sharks (1998–99)	28–32–10	T
71	March 24, 1999	2–0	@ Edmonton Oilers (1998–99)	29–32–10	W
72	March 25, 1999	1–2	@ Calgary Flames (1998–99)	29–33–10	L
73	March 27, 1999	1–5	@ Vancouver Canucks (1998–99)	29–34–10	L

April: 3–5–1 (home: 3–2–0; road: 0–3–1)

Game	Date	Score	Opponent	Record	Recap
74	April 1, 1999	2–3	Boston Bruins (1998–99)	29–35–10	L
75	April 3, 1999	2–1	Buffalo Sabres (1998–99)	30–35–10	W
76	April 5, 1999	0–3	@ Boston Bruins (1998–99)	30–36–10	L
77	April 7, 1999	2–0	Carolina Hurricanes (1998–99)	31–36–10	W
78	April 8, 1999	1–3	@ New York Islanders (1998–99)	31–37–10	L
79	April 10, 1999	2–6	New Jersey Devils (1998–99)	31–38–10	L
80	April 13, 1999	2–2 OT	@ Tampa Bay Lightning (1998–99)	31–38–11	T
81	April 14, 1999	2–3 OT	@ Florida Panthers (1998–99)	31–39–11	L
82	April 17, 1999	3–2	Toronto Maple Leafs (1998–99)	32–39–11	W

Legend: W Win (2 points) L Loss (0 points) T Tie (1 point)

== Player statistics ==
=== Scoring ===
- Position abbreviations: C = Centre; D = Defence; G = Goaltender; LW = Left wing; RW = Right wing
- † = Joined team via a transaction (e.g., trade, waivers, signing) during the season. Stats reflect time with the Canadiens only.
- ‡ = Left team via a transaction (e.g., trade, waivers, release) during the season. Stats reflect time with the Canadiens only.

No.	Player	Pos	Regular season					
No.	Player	Pos	GP	G	A	Pts	+/-	PIM
8	Mark Recchi‡	RW	61	12	35	47	−4	28
11	Saku Koivu	C	65	14	30	44	−7	38
25	Vincent Damphousse‡	C	65	12	24	36	−7	46
26	Martin Rucinsky	LW	73	17	17	34	−25	50
38	Vladimir Malakhov	D	62	13	21	34	−7	77
27	Shayne Corson	LW	63	12	20	32	−10	147
17	Benoit Brunet	LW	60	14	17	31	−1	31
23	Turner Stevenson	RW	69	10	17	27	6	88
5	Stephane Quintal	D	82	8	19	27	−23	84
49	Brian Savage	LW	54	16	10	26	−14	20
37	Patrick Poulin	C	81	8	17	25	6	21
34	Sergei Zholtok	C	70	7	15	22	−12	6
44	Jonas Hoglund	LW	74	8	10	18	−5	16
22 (Note: Weinrich wore number 3 in his first game.)	Eric Weinrich†	D	66	6	12	18	−12	77
43	Patrice Brisebois	D	54	3	9	12	−8	28
55	Igor Ulanov	D	76	3	9	12	−3	109
24	Scott Thornton	LW	47	7	4	11	−2	87
52	Craig Rivet	D	66	2	8	10	−3	66
21	Jason Dawe†	RW	37	4	5	9	0	14
28 (Note: Zubrus wore number 57 in his first game.)	Dainius Zubrus†	C	17	3	5	8	−3	4
29	Brett Clark	D	61	2	2	4	−3	16
15	Eric Houde	C	8	1	1	2	−2	2
20	Scott Lachance†	D	17	1	1	2	−2	11
22	Dave Manson‡	D	11	0	2	2	−3	48
46	Matt Higgins	C	25	1	0	1	−2	0
48	Miloslav Guren	D	12	0	1	1	−1	4
31	Jeff Hackett†	G	53	0	1	1		6
45	Arron Asham	RW	7	0	0	0	−4	0
35	Andrei Bashkirov	LW	10	0	0	0	−3	0
53	Sylvain Blouin	LW	5	0	0	0	0	19
3	Brad Brown‡	D	5	0	0	0	0	21
39	Frederic Chabot	G	11	0	0	0		2
42	Jonathan Delisle	RW	1	0	0	0	0	0
30	Jean-Francois Jomphe†	C	6	0	0	0	0	0
6	Trent McCleary	RW	46	0	0	0	−1	29
36	Dave Morissette	LW	10	0	0	0	1	52
56	Alain Nasreddine†	D	8	0	0	0	1	33
14	Terry Ryan	LW	1	0	0	0	0	5
60	Jose Theodore	G	18	0	0	0		0
41	Jocelyn Thibault‡	G	10	0	0	0		0

=== Goaltending ===
- † = Joined team via a transaction (e.g., trade, waivers, signing) during the season. Stats reflect time with the Canadiens only.
- ‡ = Left team via a transaction (e.g., trade, waivers, release) during the season. Stats reflect time with the Canadiens only.

No.	Player	Regular season									
No.	Player	GP	W	L	T	SA	GA	GAA	SV%	SO	TOI
31	Jeff Hackett†	53	24	20	9	1360	117	2.27	.914	5	3091
60	Jose Theodore	18	4	12	0	406	50	3.29	.877	1	913
41	Jocelyn Thibault‡	10	3	4	2	250	23	2.61	.908	1	529
39	Frederic Chabot	11	1	3	0	188	16	2.23	.915	0	430

== Awards and records ==
=== Awards ===
Type	Award/honour	Recipient	Ref
League (in-season)	NHL All-Star Game selection	Mark Recchi	
League (in-season)	NHL Player of the Week	Mark Recchi (November 9)	
League (in-season)	NHL Player of the Week	Jeff Hackett (January 4)	
Team	Jacques Beauchamp Molson Trophy	Benoit Brunet	
Team	Molson Cup	Jeff Hackett	

=== Milestones ===
Milestone	Player	Date	Ref
First game	Miloslav Guren	October 10, 1998	
First game	Dave Morissette	October 16, 1998	
First game	Jonathan Delisle	October 21, 1998	
First game	Andrei Bashkirov	November 21, 1998	
First game	Arron Asham	November 28, 1998	

== Draft picks ==
Montreal's draft picks at the 1998 NHL entry draft held at the Marine Midland Arena in Buffalo, New York.

Round	#	Player	Nationality	College/Junior/Club team (League)
1	16	Eric Chouinard	Canada	Quebec Remparts (QMJHL)
2	45	Mike Ribeiro	Canada	Rouyn-Noranda Huskies (QMJHL)
3	75	Francois Beauchemin	Canada	Laval Titan Collège Français (QMJHL)
5	132	Andrei Bashkirov	Russia	Fort Wayne Komets (IHL)
6	152	Gordie Dwyer	Canada	Beauport Harfangs (QMJHL)
6	162	Andrei Markov	Russia	Khimik Voskresensk (Russia)
7	189	Andrei Kruchinin	Russia	Lada Togliatti (Russia)
8	201	Craig Murray	Canada	University of Michigan (CCHA)
8	216	Michael Ryder	Canada	Hull Olympiques (QMJHL)
9	247	Darcy Harris	Canada	Kitchener Rangers (OHL)

== See also ==
- 1998–99 NHL season
