= Dan Kesa =

Scottish-Canadian ice hockey player

- Born: November 23, 1971 (age 54) Vancouver, British Columbia, Canada
- Height: 6 ft 0 in (183 cm)
- Weight: 208 lb (94 kg; 14 st 12 lb)
- Position: Right wing
- Shot: Right
- Played for: Vancouver Canucks; Dallas Stars; Pittsburgh Penguins; Tampa Bay Lightning; Avangard Omsk; Vienna Capitals
- NHL draft: 95th overall, 1991; Vancouver Canucks
- Playing career: 1992–2003

Dragan "Dan" Kesa (born November 23, 1971) is a Serbian-Canadian former professional ice hockey player who played in the National Hockey League for the Vancouver Canucks, Dallas Stars, Pittsburgh Penguins and the Tampa Bay Lightning.

== Career ==
Drafted 95th overall by the Canucks in the 1991 NHL entry draft, Kesa played 139 regular season games, scoring 8 goals and 22 assists for 30 points and collecting 66 penalty minutes. Previously to the NHL he played for a short period for the Detroit Vipers. Kesa had spells in the Russian Super League for Avangard Omsk and the Austrian Hockey League for the Vienna Capitals before hanging up his skates.

== Personal life ==
Kesa was born in Vancouver, British Columbia. He is the uncle of Milan Lucic who is currently playing in the National Hockey League (NHL) for the Boston Bruins, Jovan Lučić who is a footballer and plays for POFC Botev Vratsa of the First Professional Football League (Bulgaria), and Nikola Lucic. Kesa resides in Vancouver, British Columbia.

== Career statistics ==
=== Regular season and playoffs ===
			Regular season					Playoffs
Season	Team	League	GP	G	A	Pts	PIM	GP	G	A	Pts	PIM
1988–89	Richmond Sockeyes	BCJHL	44	21	21	42	71	—	—	—	—	—
1989–90	Richmond Sockeyes	BCJHL	54	39	38	77	103	—	—	—	—	—
1990–91	Prince Albert Raiders	WHL	69	30	23	53	116	3	1	1	2	0
1991–92	Prince Albert Raiders	WHL	62	46	51	97	201	10	9	10	19	27
1992–93	Hamilton Canucks	AHL	62	16	24	40	76	—	—	—	—	—
1993–94	Hamilton Canucks	AHL	53	37	33	70	33	4	1	4	5	4
1993–94	Vancouver Canucks	NHL	19	2	4	6	18	—	—	—	—	—
1994–95	Syracuse Crunch	AHL	70	34	44	78	81	—	—	—	—	—
1995–96	Michigan K-Wings	IHL	15	4	11	15	33	—	—	—	—	—
1995–96	Detroit Vipers	IHL	27	9	6	15	22	12	6	4	10	4
1995–96	Springfield Falcons	AHL	22	10	5	15	13	—	—	—	—	—
1995–96	Dallas Stars	NHL	3	0	0	0	0	—	—	—	—	—
1996–97	Detroit Vipers	IHL	60	22	21	43	19	20	7	5	12	20
1997–98	Detroit Vipers	IHL	76	40	37	77	40	20	13	5	18	14
1998–99	Pittsburgh Penguins	NHL	67	2	8	10	27	13	1	0	1	0
1998–99	Detroit Vipers	IHL	8	3	5	8	12	—	—	—	—	—
1999–00	Tampa Bay Lightning	NHL	50	4	10	14	21	—	—	—	—	—
1999–00	Detroit Vipers	IHL	5	3	0	3	2	—	—	—	—	—
1999–00	Manitoba Moose	IHL	1	0	0	0	0	—	—	—	—	—
2000–01	Manitoba Moose	IHL	79	16	31		13	2	3	5	12
2001–02	Omsk Avangard	RSL	9	0	1	1	4	—	—	—	—	—
2002–03	Vienna Capitals	AUT	27	4	16	20	12	—	—	—	—	—
NHL totals			139	8	22	30	66	13	1	0	1	0
