= Karel Bětík =

- Born: October 28, 1978 (age 47) Ostrava, Czechoslovakia
- Height: 6 ft 2 in (188 cm)
- Weight: 203 lb (92 kg; 14 st 7 lb)
- Position: Defence
- Shot: Left
- Played for: Tampa Bay Lightning
- NHL draft: 112th overall, 1997; Tampa Bay Lightning
- Playing career: 1998–2005

Karel Bětík (born October 28, 1978) is a Czech former professional ice hockey defenceman. He was drafted in the fifth round, 112th overall, by the Tampa Bay Lightning in the 1997 NHL entry draft. He played three games in the National Hockey League with the Lightning, during the 1998–99 season, scoring two assists.

== Career statistics ==
=== Regular season and playoffs ===
| | | | Regular season | | | | | Playoffs |
| Season | Team | League | GP | G | A | Pts | PIM | GP | G | A | Pts | PIM |
|---|---|---|---|---|---|---|---|---|---|---|---|---|
| 1996–97 | Kelowna Rockets | WHL | 56 | 3 | 10 | 13 | 76 | 6 | 1 | 1 | 2 | 2 |
| 1997–98 | Kelowna Rockets | WHL | 61 | 5 | 25 | 30 | 121 | 7 | 1 | 2 | 3 | 8 |
| 1998–99 | Tampa Bay Lightning | NHL | 3 | 0 | 2 | 2 | 2 | — | — | — | — | — |
| 1998–99 | Cleveland Lumberjacks | IHL | 74 | 5 | 11 | 16 | 97 | — | — | — | — | — |
| 1999–00 | Detroit Vipers | IHL | 17 | 0 | 0 | 0 | 22 | — | — | — | — | — |
| 1999–00 | Toledo Storm | ECHL | 22 | 0 | 7 | 7 | 42 | — | — | — | — | — |
| 2000–01 | Bakersfield Condors | WCHL | 62 | 3 | 18 | 21 | 105 | 3 | 0 | 1 | 1 | 10 |
| 2001–02 | B.C. Icemen | UHL | 70 | 7 | 26 | 33 | 74 | 8 | 0 | 2 | 2 | 15 |
| 2002–03 | Flint Generals | UHL | 56 | 5 | 11 | 16 | 51 | — | — | — | — | — |
| 2002–03 | Rockford IceHogs | UHL | 10 | 1 | 2 | 3 | 8 | 3 | 0 | 0 | 0 | 4 |
| 2003–04 | Sherbrooke Saint-François | QSMHL | 50 | 5 | 20 | 25 | 54 | 10 | 0 | 1 | 1 | 8 |
| 2004–05 | Sherbrooke Saint-François | LNAH | 50 | 2 | 9 | 11 | 34 | — | — | — | — | — |
| NHL totals | | | 3 | 0 | 2 | 2 | 2 | — | — | — | — | — |
