= Sean Pronger =

Canadian ice hockey player

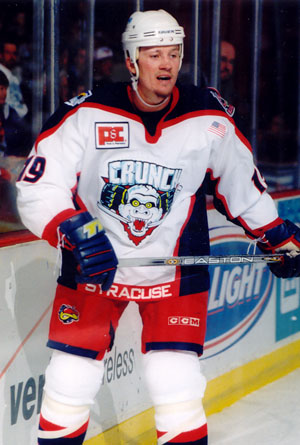
- Pronger with the Syracuse Crunch during the 2001–02 season
- Born: November 30, 1972 (age 53) Thunder Bay, Ontario, Canada
- Height: 6 ft 3 in (191 cm)
- Weight: 210 lb (95 kg; 15 st 0 lb)
- Position: Centre
- Shot: Left
- Played for: Anaheim Ducks; Pittsburgh Penguins; New York Rangers; Los Angeles Kings; Boston Bruins; Columbus Blue Jackets; Vancouver Canucks; Frankfurt Lions
- NHL draft: 51st overall, 1991; Vancouver Canucks
- Playing career: 1994–2005

Sean James Pronger (born November 30, 1972) is a Canadian former professional ice hockey player who grew up in Dryden, Ontario, and played in the National Hockey League (NHL) from 1995 to 2004. He played for the following teams: Anaheim Ducks, Pittsburgh Penguins, New York Rangers, Los Angeles Kings, Boston Bruins, Columbus Blue Jackets and Vancouver Canucks, having been drafted 51st overall by Vancouver in 1991. In 260 regular-season games, he scored 23 goals and 36 assists for 59 points, picking up 159 penalty minutes. He is the older brother of Chris Pronger. Their mother Eila Pronger is from Pori, Finland.

== Career statistics ==
=== Regular season and playoffs ===
			Regular season					Playoffs
Season	Team	League	GP	G	A	Pts	PIM	GP	G	A	Pts	PIM
1988–89	Kenora Boise	MMHL	33	38	30	68	—	—	—	—	—	—
1989–90	Thunder Bay Flyers	USHL	48	18	34	52	61	—	—	—	—	—
1990–91	Bowling Green State University	CCHA	40	3	7	10	30	—	—	—	—	—
1991–92	Bowling Green State University	CCHA	34	9	7	16	28	—	—	—	—	—
1992–93	Bowling Green State University	CCHA	39	23	23	46	35	—	—	—	—	—
1993–94	Bowling Green State University	CCHA	38	17	17	34	38	—	—	—	—	—
1994–95	San Diego Gulls	IHL	8	0	0	0	2	—	—	—	—	—
1994–95	Greensboro Monarchs	ECHL	2	0	2	2	0	—	—	—	—	—
1994–95	Knoxville Cherokees	ECHL	34	18	23	41	55	—	—	—	—	—
1995–96	Mighty Ducks of Anaheim	NHL	7	0	1	1	6	—	—	—	—	—
1995–96	Baltimore Bandits	AHL	72	16	17	33	61	12	3	7	10	16
1996–97	Mighty Ducks of Anaheim	NHL	39	7	7	14	20	9	0	2	2	4
1996–97	Baltimore Bandits	AHL	41	26	17	43	17	—	—	—	—	—
1997–98	Mighty Ducks of Anaheim	NHL	62	5	15	20	30	—	—	—	—	—
1997–98	Pittsburgh Penguins	NHL	5	1	0	1	2	5	0	0	0	4
1998–99	Houston Aeros	IHL	16	11	7	18	32	—	—	—	—	—
1998–99	Pittsburgh Penguins	NHL	2	0	0	0	0	—	—	—	—	—
1998–99	New York Rangers	NHL	14	0	3	3	4	—	—	—	—	—
1998–99	Los Angeles Kings	NHL	13	0	1	1	4	—	—	—	—	—
1999–00	Providence Bruins	AHL	51	11	18	29	26	—	—	—	—	—
1999–00	Boston Bruins	NHL	11	0	1	1	13	—	—	—	—	—
1999–00	Manitoba Moose	IHL	14	3	5	8	21	2	0	1	1	2
2000–01	Manitoba Moose	IHL	82	18	21	39	85	13	3	6	9	2
2001–02	Syracuse Crunch	AHL	54	23	26	49	53	8	4	1	5	10
2001–02	Columbus Blue Jackets	NHL	26	3	1	4	4	—	—	—	—	—
2002–03	Columbus Blue Jackets	NHL	78	7	6	13	72	—	—	—	—	—
2003–04	Syracuse Crunch	AHL	7	2	0	2	7	—	—	—	—	—
2003–04	Manitoba Moose	AHL	68	17	15	32	68	—	—	—	—	—
2003–04	Vancouver Canucks	NHL	3	0	1	1	4	—	—	—	—	—
2004–05	Frankfurt Lions	DEL	51	6	10	16	78	4	0	0	0	6
NHL totals			260	23	36	59	159	14	0	2	2	8

== Transactions ==
- June 22, 1991 - Drafted by the Vancouver Canucks in the 3rd round, 51st overall, in the 1991 NHL entry draft.
- February 14, 1995 - Signed as a free agent with the Mighty Ducks of Anaheim
- March 24, 1998 - Traded by the Mighty Ducks of Anaheim to the Pittsburgh Penguins in exchange for Patrick Lalime.
- November 25, 1998 - Traded by the Pittsburgh Penguins, along with Petr Nedvěd and Chris Tamer, to the New York Rangers in exchange for Alexei Kovalev and Harry York.
- February 12, 1999 - Traded by the New York Rangers to the Los Angeles Kings in exchange for Eric Lacroix.
- August 25, 1999 - Signed as a free agent with the Boston Bruins.
- December 5, 2000 - Traded by the Boston Bruins to the New York Islanders in exchange for future considerations.
- May 18, 2001 - Claimed on waivers by the Columbus Blue Jackets from the New York Islanders.
- October 30, 2003 - Traded by the Columbus Blue Jackets to the Vancouver Canucks in exchange for Zenith Komarniski.
