= 1998–99 Edmonton Oilers season =

NHL team season

1998–99 Edmonton Oilers
- Division: 2nd Northwest
- Conference: 8th Western
- 1998–99 record: 33–37–12
- Home record: 17–19–5
- Road record: 16–18–7
- Goals for: 230
- Goals against: 226

Team information
- General manager: Glen Sather
- Coach: Ron Low
- Captain: Kelly Buchberger
- Alternate captains: Bill Guerin; Boris Mironov (Oct.–Mar.); Doug Weight
- Arena: Skyreach Centre
- Average attendance: 16,244 (95.0%)
- Minor league affiliates: Hamilton Bulldogs (AHL); New Orleans Brass (ECHL)

Team leaders
- Goals: Bill Guerin (30)
- Assists: Bill Guerin (34)
- Points: Bill Guerin (64)
- Penalty minutes: Sean Brown (188)
- Plus/minus: Tom Poti (+10)
- Wins: Bob Essensa (12); Mikhail Shtalenkov (12)
- Goals against average: Mikhail Shtalenkov (2.67)

The 1998–99 Edmonton Oilers season was the Oilers' 20th season in the NHL, and they were coming off a 35–37–10 record in 1997–98, earning their 2nd straight playoff appearance.

During the off-season, the Oilers franchise remaining in Edmonton looked very unlikely, as Oilers owner Peter Pocklington would be talking to a group from Houston which, if successful in the purchase, would relocate the club to Houston. At the last minute, the Edmonton Investors Group, a consortium of 37 Edmonton-based owners, raised the funds to purchase the team from Pocklington, vowing to keep the Oilers in Edmonton. The Oilers received support throughout the NHL, and the club would remain.

Also during the off-season, the Oilers would lose goaltender Curtis Joseph, as he would leave the team as a free agent and join the Toronto Maple Leafs, leaving the goaltending duties to Bob Essensa and former Mighty Ducks of Anaheim backup Mikhail Shtalenkov, and Edmonton would join the newly created Northwest Division, along with their Western Canada rivals the Calgary Flames and Vancouver Canucks, as well as the Colorado Avalanche.

Edmonton would start the season with a 7–4–0 record in their opening 11 games, and would remain close to the .500 mark until early February, despite losing Doug Weight to injuries. Edmonton would then go into a slump, and would drop out of a playoff spot, and on March 17, the Oilers would be 25–33–10, sitting in ninth place. Three days later, the Oilers would send Mats Lindgren and an eighth-round draft pick to the New York Islanders in exchange for goaltender Tommy Salo. Edmonton would also deal Boris Mironov and Dean McAmmond to the Chicago Blackhawks for youngsters Ethan Moreau, Christian Laflamme and Chad Kilger, and acquire Jason Smith from the Toronto Maple Leafs for a fourth-round draft pick on March 23.

The moves paid off for the Oilers, as they would post an 8–4–2 record after the Salo deal and sneak into the final playoff position, finishing the season with a 33–37–12 record. On April 3, 1999, Patrick Roy defeated the Edmonton Oilers and passed Glenn Hall with his 408th victory.

Offensively, Bill Guerin would be Edmonton's leader, scoring a team high 30 goals and 34 assists for 64 points. Josef Beranek would earn 49 points, while Mike Grier would have a breakout season, scoring 20 goals and earning 44 points. Doug Weight would register 37 points in only 43 games. Defensively, Boris Mironov would lead blueline with 40 points, but was dealt to Chicago at the trade deadline. Roman Hamrlik chipped in with 32 points, while Janne Niinimaa would earn 28. Sean Brown would have a team high 188 penalty minutes in only 51 games.

In goal, Bob Essensa and Mikhail Shtalenkov would split time for a majority of the season, each earning 12 victories. Shtalenkov would then be traded to the Phoenix Coyotes, and the Oilers would acquire Tommy Salo to become the new starter, and in 13 games, Salo would go 8–2–2 with a 2.31 goals against average (GAA).

The Oilers opened the playoffs against the Presidents' Trophy-winning Dallas Stars, who had finished the year with 114 points, 36 higher than the Oilers. Edmonton found themselves down in the series 2–0 after dropping two close games in Dallas. The Stars quickly eliminated the Oilers, winning the next two games in Edmonton by 3–2 scores to sweep the series. The Stars continued on to win the Stanley Cup.

== Regular season ==
The Oilers lead the NHL in power-play opportunities, with 438.

=== Season standings ===
Northwest Division
| R | CR | | GP | W | L | T | GF | GA | PIM | Pts |
|---|---|---|---|---|---|---|---|---|---|---|
| 1 | 2 | **Colorado Avalanche** | 82 | 44 | 28 | 10 | 239 | 205 | 1619 | 98 |
| 2 | 8 | **Edmonton Oilers** | 82 | 33 | 37 | 12 | 230 | 226 | 1373 | 78 |
| 3 | 9 | Calgary Flames | 82 | 30 | 40 | 12 | 211 | 234 | 1389 | 72 |
| 4 | 13 | Vancouver Canucks | 82 | 23 | 47 | 12 | 192 | 258 | 1764 | 58 |

Western Conference
| R | | Div | GP | W | L | T | GF | GA | Pts |
|---|---|---|---|---|---|---|---|---|---|
| **1** | **p – Dallas Stars** | **PAC** | **82** | **51** | **19** | **12** | **236** | **168** | **114** |
| **2** | **y – Colorado Avalanche** | **NW** | **82** | **44** | **28** | **10** | **239** | **205** | **98** |
| **3** | **y – Detroit Red Wings** | **CEN** | **82** | **43** | **32** | **7** | **245** | **202** | **93** |
| **4** | **Phoenix Coyotes** | **PAC** | **82** | **39** | **31** | **12** | **205** | **197** | **90** |
| **5** | **St. Louis Blues** | **CEN** | **82** | **37** | **32** | **13** | **237** | **209** | **87** |
| **6** | **Mighty Ducks of Anaheim** | **PAC** | **82** | **35** | **34** | **13** | **215** | **206** | **83** |
| **7** | **San Jose Sharks** | **PAC** | **82** | **31** | **33** | **18** | **196** | **191** | **80** |
| **8** | **Edmonton Oilers** | **NW** | **82** | **33** | **37** | **12** | **230** | **226** | **78** |
| 9 | Calgary Flames | NW | 82 | 30 | 40 | 12 | 211 | 234 | 72 |
| 10 | Chicago Blackhawks | CEN | 82 | 29 | 41 | 12 | 202 | 248 | 70 |
| 11 | Los Angeles Kings | PAC | 82 | 32 | 45 | 5 | 189 | 222 | 69 |
| 12 | Nashville Predators | CEN | 82 | 28 | 47 | 7 | 190 | 261 | 63 |
| 13 | Vancouver Canucks | NW | 82 | 23 | 47 | 12 | 192 | 258 | 58 |

Divisions: CEN – Central, PAC – Pacific, NW – Northwest

bold – Qualified for playoffs; p – Won Presidents' Trophy; y – Won division

== Schedule and results ==
=== Regular season ===
1998–99 regular season
October: 5–4–0 (home: 2–2–0; road: 3–2–0)

| Game | Date | Visitor | Score | Home | OT | Decision | Attendance | Record | Pts | Recap |
|---|---|---|---|---|---|---|---|---|---|---|
| 1 | October 10 | Los Angeles Kings | 2 – 1 | Edmonton Oilers | | Shtalenkov | 17,100 | 0–1–0 | 0 | L |
| 2 | October 13 | Toronto Maple Leafs | 3 – 2 | Edmonton Oilers | | Shtalenkov | 16,433 | 0–2–0 | 0 | L |
| 3 | October 14 | Edmonton Oilers | 4 – 1 | Vancouver Canucks | | Shtalenkov | 14,474 | 1–2–0 | 2 | W |
| 4 | October 17 | Edmonton Oilers | 4 – 2 | New Jersey Devils | | Shtalenkov | 15,737 | 2–2–0 | 4 | W |
| 5 | October 20 | Edmonton Oilers | 2 – 3 | New York Rangers | | Essensa | 18,200 | 2–3–0 | 4 | L |
| 6 | October 21 | Edmonton Oilers | 4 – 2 | New York Islanders | | Shtalenkov | 5,200 | 3–3–0 | 6 | W |
| 7 | October 24 | Edmonton Oilers | 4 – 6 | Colorado Avalanche | | Essensa | 16,061 | 3–4–0 | 6 | L |
| 8 | October 28 | Washington Capitals | 2 – 8 | Edmonton Oilers | | Essensa | 14,290 | 4–4–0 | 8 | W |
| 9 | October 31 | Pittsburgh Penguins | 1 – 4 | Edmonton Oilers | | Essensa | 16,171 | 5–4–0 | 10 | W |

November: 7–5–1 (home: 3–3–0; road: 4–2–1)

| Game | Date | Visitor | Score | Home | OT | Decision | Attendance | Record | Pts | Recap |
|---|---|---|---|---|---|---|---|---|---|---|
| 10 | November 2 | Vancouver Canucks | 3 – 5 | Edmonton Oilers | | Essensa | 15,260 | 6–4–0 | 12 | W |
| 11 | November 4 | Nashville Predators | 2 – 3 | Edmonton Oilers | | Essensa | 14,054 | 7–4–0 | 14 | W |
| 12 | November 6 | Colorado Avalanche | 5 – 2 | Edmonton Oilers | | Essensa | 17,100 | 7–5–0 | 14 | L |
| 13 | November 8 | Edmonton Oilers | 3 – 2 | Chicago Blackhawks | OT | Shtalenkov | 16,395 | 8–5–0 | 16 | W |
| 14 | November 11 | Edmonton Oilers | 2 – 3 | Toronto Maple Leafs | | Shtalenkov | 15,726 | 8–6–0 | 16 | L |
| 15 | November 12 | Edmonton Oilers | 1 – 1 | Ottawa Senators | OT | Essensa | 14,680 | 8–6–1 | 17 | T |
| 16 | November 14 | Edmonton Oilers | 4 – 1 | Montreal Canadiens | | Shtalenkov | 20,341 | 9–6–1 | 19 | W |
| 17 | November 18 | Detroit Red Wings | 6 – 2 | Edmonton Oilers | | Essensa | 17,100 | 9–7–1 | 19 | L |
| 18 | November 20 | Edmonton Oilers | 3 – 2 | Mighty Ducks of Anaheim | OT | Shtalenkov | 16,367 | 10–7–1 | 21 | W |
| 19 | November 21 | Edmonton Oilers | 2 – 3 | Phoenix Coyotes | OT | Shtalenkov | 16,210 | 10–8–1 | 21 | L |
| 20 | November 25 | Colorado Avalanche | 0 – 3 | Edmonton Oilers | | Shtalenkov | 15,499 | 11–8–1 | 23 | W |
| 21 | November 27 | Edmonton Oilers | 3 – 2 | Calgary Flames | | Shtalenkov | 17,104 | 12–8–1 | 25 | W |
| 22 | November 29 | Chicago Blackhawks | 3 – 2 | Edmonton Oilers | | Shtalenkov | 15,515 | 12–9–1 | 25 | L |

December: 3–8–2 (home: 2–4–0; road: 1–4–2)

| Game | Date | Visitor | Score | Home | OT | Decision | Attendance | Record | Pts | Recap |
|---|---|---|---|---|---|---|---|---|---|---|
| 23 | December 2 | Phoenix Coyotes | 3 – 4 | Edmonton Oilers | | Shtalenkov | 14,281 | 13–9–1 | 27 | W |
| 24 | December 4 | Tampa Bay Lightning | 2 – 1 | Edmonton Oilers | | Shtalenkov | 15,303 | 13–10–1 | 27 | L |
| 25 | December 6 | Dallas Stars | 6 – 2 | Edmonton Oilers | | Essensa | 16,458 | 13–11–1 | 27 | L |
| 26 | December 8 | Edmonton Oilers | 3 – 3 | Nashville Predators | OT | Shtalenkov | 14,529 | 13–11–2 | 28 | T |
| 27 | December 9 | Edmonton Oilers | 1 – 3 | Chicago Blackhawks | | Shtalenkov | 15,546 | 13–12–2 | 28 | L |
| 28 | December 11 | Edmonton Oilers | 2 – 3 | Detroit Red Wings | | Essensa | 19,983 | 13–13–2 | 28 | L |
| 29 | December 13 | Edmonton Oilers | 2 – 2 | Philadelphia Flyers | OT | Shtalenkov | 19,513 | 13–13–3 | 29 | T |
| 30 | December 15 | Edmonton Oilers | 0 – 3 | Carolina Hurricanes | | Shtalenkov | 5,684 | 13–14–3 | 29 | L |
| 31 | December 18 | Edmonton Oilers | 4 – 1 | Tampa Bay Lightning | | Essensa | 10,289 | 14–14–3 | 31 | W |
| 32 | December 19 | Edmonton Oilers | 1 – 3 | Florida Panthers | | Shtalankov | 17,953 | 14–15–3 | 31 | L |
| 33 | December 23 | San Jose Sharks | 5 – 3 | Edmonton Oilers | | Essensa | 16,350 | 14–16–3 | 31 | L |
| 34 | December 27 | Vancouver Canucks | 0 – 3 | Edmonton Oilers | | Shtalenkov | 17,100 | 15–16–3 | 33 | W |
| 35 | December 29 | Montreal Canadiens | 5 – 2 | Edmonton Oilers | | Shtalenkov | 17,100 | 15–17–3 | 33 | L |

January: 4–3–4 (home: 2–2–2; road: 2–1–2)

| Game | Date | Visitor | Score | Home | OT | Decision | Attendance | Record | Pts | Recap |
|---|---|---|---|---|---|---|---|---|---|---|
| 36 | January 3 | Philadelphia Flyers | 3 – 3 | Edmonton Oilers | OT | Shtalenkov | 17,100 | 15–17–4 | 34 | T |
| 37 | January 5 | Los Angeles Kings | 4 – 3 | Edmonton Oilers | OT | Shtalenkov | 14,370 | 15–18–4 | 34 | L |
| 38 | January 7 | Edmonton Oilers | 7 – 1 | Phoenix Coyotes | | Essensa | 15,102 | 16–18–4 | 36 | W |
| 39 | January 9 | Edmonton Oilers | 1 – 1 | Los Angeles Kings | OT | Essensa | 14,936 | 16–18–5 | 37 | T |
| 40 | January 10 | Edmonton Oilers | 4 – 6 | Mighty Ducks of Anaheim | | Shtalenkov | 17,174 | 16–19–5 | 37 | L |
| 41 | January 12 | Dallas Stars | 2 – 2 | Edmonton Oilers | OT | Essensa | 16,201 | 16–19–6 | 38 | T |
| 42 | January 14 | Edmonton Oilers | 3 – 1 | Vancouver Canucks | | Essensa | 15,910 | 17–19–6 | 40 | W |
| 43 | January 17 | Detroit Red Wings | 1 – 4 | Edmonton Oilers | | Essensa | 17,100 | 18–19–6 | 42 | W |
| 44 | January 21 | Edmonton Oilers | 3 – 3 | San Jose Sharks | OT | Essensa | 17,483 | 18–19–7 | 43 | T |
| 45 | January 27 | Chicago Blackhawks | 4 – 3 | Edmonton Oilers | OT | Essensa | 16,281 | 18–20–7 | 43 | L |
| 46 | January 30 | Mighty Ducks of Anaheim | 0 – 1 | Edmonton Oilers | | Shtalenkov | 17,100 | 19–20–7 | 45 | W |

February: 4–8–2 (home: 2–4–2; road: 2–4–0)

| Game | Date | Visitor | Score | Home | OT | Decision | Attendance | Record | Pts | Recap |
|---|---|---|---|---|---|---|---|---|---|---|
| 47 | February 1 | St. Louis Blues | 4 – 3 | Edmonton Oilers | OT | Shtalenkov | 14,021 | 19–21–7 | 45 | L |
| 48 | February 3 | Ottawa Senators | 2 – 2 | Edmonton Oilers | OT | Essensa | 14,487 | 19–21–8 | 46 | T |
| 49 | February 5 | Nashville Predators | 2 – 4 | Edmonton Oilers | | Essensa | 15,552 | 20–21–8 | 48 | W |
| 50 | February 8 | Edmonton Oilers | 1 – 2 | Calgary Flames | | Essensa | 16,842 | 20–22–8 | 48 | L |
| 51 | February 9 | Boston Bruins | 2 – 0 | Edmonton Oilers | | Shtalenkov | 16,173 | 20–23–8 | 48 | L |
| 52 | February 11 | Edmonton Oilers | 2 – 4 | Detroit Red Wings | | Essensa | 19,983 | 20–24–8 | 48 | L |
| 53 | February 13 | Edmonton Oilers | 3 – 2 | St. Louis Blues | | Essensa | 20,209 | 21–24–8 | 50 | W |
| 54 | February 15 | Edmonton Oilers | 1 – 4 | Dallas Stars | | Essensa | 16,928 | 21–25–8 | 50 | L |
| 55 | February 17 | Edmonton Oilers | 6 – 2 | Mighty Ducks of Anaheim | | Shtalenkov | 14,540 | 22–25–8 | 52 | W |
| 56 | February 18 | Edmonton Oilers | 2 – 3 | Los Angeles Kings | | Shtalenkov | 11,287 | 22–26–8 | 52 | L |
| 57 | February 21 | New York Rangers | 2 – 1 | Edmonton Oilers | OT | Essensa | 17,100 | 22–27–8 | 52 | L |
| 58 | February 24 | Mighty Ducks of Anaheim | 2 – 1 | Edmonton Oilers | | Passmore | 16,001 | 22–28–8 | 52 | L |
| 59 | February 26 | Buffalo Sabres | 3 – 6 | Edmonton Oilers | | Essensa | 17,100 | 23–28–8 | 54 | W |
| 60 | February 27 | Carolina Hurricanes | 2 – 2 | Edmonton Oilers | OT | Passmore | 17,100 | 23–28–9 | 55 | T |

March: 5–7–2 (home: 3–3–1; road: 2–4–1)

| Game | Date | Visitor | Score | Home | OT | Decision | Attendance | Record | Pts | Recap |
|---|---|---|---|---|---|---|---|---|---|---|
| 61 | March 1 | Edmonton Oilers | 4 – 3 | Colorado Avalanche | | Essensa | 16,061 | 24–28–9 | 57 | W |
| 62 | March 3 | Edmonton Oilers | 5 – 3 | Buffalo Sabres | | Passmore | 18,595 | 25–28–9 | 59 | W |
| 63 | March 5 | Edmonton Oilers | 2 – 2 | Pittsburgh Penguins | OT | Essnesa | 15,688 | 25–28–10 | 60 | T |
| 64 | March 6 | Edmonton Oilers | 3 – 4 | Washington Capitals | | Passmore | 19,740 | 25–29–10 | 60 | L |
| 65 | March 10 | Edmonton Oilers | 4 – 7 | Dallas Stars | | Shtalenkov | 16,928 | 25–30–10 | 60 | L |
| 66 | March 13 | Edmonton Oilers | 4 – 6 | St. Louis Blues | | Essensa | 18,071 | 25–31–10 | 60 | L |
| 67 | March 14 | Edmonton Oilers | 1 – 3 | Nashville Predators | | Passmore | 16,148 | 25–32–10 | 60 | L |
| 68 | March 17 | New Jersey Devils | 4 – 1 | Edmonton Oilers | | Passmore | 15,581 | 25–33–10 | 60 | L |
| 69 | March 20 | Vancouver Canucks | 3 – 4 | Edmonton Oilers | | Salo | 17,100 | 26–33–10 | 62 | W |
| 70 | March 22 | Calgary Flames | 2 – 2 | Edmonton Oilers | OT | Salo | 17,100 | 26–33–11 | 63 | T |
| 71 | March 24 | Montreal Canadiens | 2 – 0 | Edmonton Oilers | | Salo | 17,100 | 26–34–11 | 63 | L |
| 72 | March 26 | St. Louis Blues | 1 – 2 | Edmonton Oilers | | Salo | 16,318 | 27–34–11 | 65 | W |
| 73 | March 28 | San Jose Sharks | 2 – 5 | Edmonton Oilers | | Salo | 16,512 | 28–34–11 | 67 | W |
| 74 | March 30 | Phoenix Coyotes | 7 – 4 | Edmonton Oilers | | Essensa | 17,100 | 28–35–11 | 67 | L |

April: 5–2–1 (home: 3–1–0; road: 2–1–1)

| Game | Date | Visitor | Score | Home | OT | Decision | Attendance | Record | Pts | Recap |
|---|---|---|---|---|---|---|---|---|---|---|
| 75 | April 1 | Toronto Maple Leafs | 5 – 1 | Edmonton Oilers | | Salo | 17,100 | 28–36–11 | 67 | L |
| 76 | April 3 | Edmonton Oilers | 2 – 5 | Colorado Avalanche | | Essensa | 16,061 | 28–37–11 | 67 | L |
| 77 | April 7 | Calgary Flames | 2 – 4 | Edmonton Oilers | | Salo | 17,100 | 29–37–11 | 69 | W |
| 78 | April 9 | Edmonton Oilers | 4 – 1 | Calgary Flames | | Salo | 17,104 | 30–37–11 | 71 | W |
| 79 | April 10 | Edmonton Oilers | 1 – 1 | Vancouver Canucks | OT | Salo | 16,217 | 30–37–12 | 72 | T |
| 80 | April 12 | Edmonton Oilers | 5 – 4 | San Jose Sharks | OT | Salo | 17,483 | 31–37–12 | 74 | W |
| 81 | April 16 | Colorado Avalanche | 1 – 5 | Edmonton Oilers | | Salo | 17,100 | 32–37–12 | 76 | W |
| 82 | April 17 | Calgary Flames | 2 – 3 | Edmonton Oilers | | Salo | 17,100 | 33–37–12 | 78 | W |

Legend: W Win (2 points) L Loss (0 points) T Tie (1 point)

=== Playoffs ===
1999 Stanley Cup playoffs
Western Conference Quarterfinals vs. (1) Dallas Stars – Stars win 4–0

| Game | Date | Visitor | Score | Home | OT | Decision | Attendance | Series | Recap |
|---|---|---|---|---|---|---|---|---|---|
| 1 | April 21 | Edmonton Oilers | 1 – 2 | Dallas Stars | | Salo | 17,001 | 0–1 | L |
| 2 | April 23 | Edmonton Oilers | 2 – 3 | Dallas Stars | | Salo | 17,001 | 0–2 | L |
| 3 | April 25 | Dallas Stars | 3 – 2 | Edmonton Oilers | | Salo | 17,100 | 0–3 | L |
| 4 | April 27 | Dallas Stars | 3 – 2 | Edmonton Oilers | 3OT | Salo | 17,100 | 0–4 | L |

Legend: W Win L Loss

== Player statistics ==
=== Scoring ===
- Position abbreviations: C = Centre; D = Defence; G = Goaltender; LW = Left wing; RW = Right wing
- † = Joined team via a transaction (e.g., trade, waivers, signing) during the season. Stats reflect time with the Oilers only.
- ‡ = Left team via a transaction (e.g., trade, waivers, release) during the season. Stats reflect time with the Oilers only.

| No. | Player | Pos | Regular season | | | | | | Playoffs | | | | | |
| No. | Player | Pos | GP | G | A | Pts | +/- | PIM | GP | G | A | Pts | +/- | PIM |
|---|---|---|---|---|---|---|---|---|---|---|---|---|---|---|
| 9 | Bill Guerin | RW | 80 | 30 | 34 | 64 | 7 | 133 | 3 | 0 | 2 | 2 | −4 | 2 |
| 20 | Josef Beranek | LW | 66 | 19 | 30 | 49 | 6 | 23 | 2 | 0 | 0 | 0 | −1 | 4 |
| 25 | Mike Grier | RW | 82 | 20 | 24 | 44 | 5 | 54 | 4 | 1 | 1 | 2 | 3 | 6 |
| 10 | Pat Falloon | RW | 82 | 17 | 23 | 40 | −4 | 20 | 4 | 0 | 1 | 1 | 0 | 4 |
| 2 | Boris Mironov‡ | D | 63 | 11 | 29 | 40 | 6 | 104 | — | — | — | — | — | — |
| 17 | Rem Murray | LW | 78 | 21 | 18 | 39 | 4 | 20 | 4 | 1 | 1 | 2 | −1 | 2 |
| 39 | Doug Weight | C | 43 | 6 | 31 | 37 | −8 | 12 | 4 | 1 | 1 | 2 | −3 | 15 |
| 26 | Todd Marchant | C | 82 | 14 | 22 | 36 | 3 | 65 | 4 | 1 | 1 | 2 | 2 | 12 |
| 22 | Roman Hamrlik | D | 75 | 8 | 24 | 32 | 9 | 70 | 3 | 0 | 0 | 0 | 1 | 2 |
| 94 | Ryan Smyth | LW | 71 | 13 | 18 | 31 | 0 | 62 | 3 | 3 | 0 | 3 | −1 | 0 |
| 44 | Janne Niinimaa | D | 81 | 4 | 24 | 28 | 7 | 88 | 4 | 0 | 0 | 0 | −2 | 2 |
| 51 | Andrei Kovalenko‡ | RW | 43 | 13 | 14 | 27 | −4 | 30 | — | — | — | — | — | — |
| 37 | Dean McAmmond‡ | C | 65 | 9 | 16 | 25 | 5 | 36 | — | — | — | — | — | — |
| 5 | Tom Poti | D | 73 | 5 | 16 | 21 | 10 | 42 | 4 | 0 | 1 | 1 | −3 | 2 |
| 14 | Mats Lindgren‡ | C | 48 | 5 | 12 | 17 | 4 | 22 | — | — | — | — | — | — |
| 28 | Alexander Selivanov† | RW | 29 | 8 | 6 | 14 | 0 | 24 | 2 | 0 | 1 | 1 | 0 | 2 |
| 19 | Boyd Devereaux | C | 61 | 6 | 8 | 14 | 2 | 23 | 1 | 0 | 0 | 0 | 0 | 0 |
| 16 | Kelly Buchberger | RW | 52 | 4 | 4 | 8 | −6 | 68 | 4 | 0 | 0 | 0 | −4 | 0 |
| 23 | Sean Brown | D | 51 | 0 | 7 | 7 | 1 | 188 | 1 | 0 | 0 | 0 | 0 | 10 |
| 42 | Kevin Brown‡ | RW | 12 | 4 | 2 | 6 | −2 | 0 | — | — | — | — | — | — |
| 18 | Ethan Moreau† | LW | 14 | 1 | 5 | 6 | 2 | 8 | 4 | 0 | 3 | 3 | 3 | 6 |
| 27 | Georges Laraque | RW | 39 | 3 | 2 | 5 | −1 | 57 | 4 | 0 | 0 | 0 | −2 | 2 |
| 33 | Marty McSorley | D | 46 | 2 | 3 | 5 | −5 | 101 | 3 | 0 | 0 | 0 | 1 | 2 |
| 46 | Todd Reirden | D | 17 | 2 | 3 | 5 | −1 | 20 | — | — | — | — | — | — |
| 8 | Frank Musil | D | 39 | 0 | 3 | 3 | 0 | 34 | 1 | 0 | 0 | 0 | −1 | 2 |
| 34 | Vladimir Vorobiev† | RW | 2 | 2 | 0 | 2 | 1 | 2 | 1 | 0 | 0 | 0 | −1 | 0 |
| 15 | Chad Kilger† | C | 13 | 1 | 1 | 2 | −3 | 4 | 4 | 0 | 0 | 0 | −2 | 4 |
| 21 | Jason Smith† | D | 12 | 1 | 1 | 2 | 0 | 11 | 4 | 0 | 1 | 1 | 0 | 4 |
| 32 | Craig Millar | D | 24 | 0 | 2 | 2 | −6 | 19 | — | — | — | — | — | — |
| 38 | Chris Ferraro | RW | 2 | 1 | 0 | 1 | 1 | 0 | — | — | — | — | — | — |
| 30 | Bob Essensa | G | 39 | 0 | 1 | 1 | | 0 | — | — | — | — | — | — |
| 24 | Christian Laflamme† | D | 11 | 0 | 1 | 1 | −3 | 0 | 4 | 0 | 1 | 1 | −4 | 2 |
| 29 | Steve Passmore | G | 6 | 0 | 1 | 1 | | 2 | — | — | — | — | — | — |
| 7 | Fredrik Bremberg | C | 8 | 0 | 0 | 0 | −2 | 2 | — | — | — | — | — | — |
| 34 | Jim Dowd | C | 1 | 0 | 0 | 0 | 0 | 0 | — | — | — | — | — | — |
| 28 | Bill Huard‡ | LW | 3 | 0 | 0 | 0 | 0 | 0 | — | — | — | — | — | — |
| 12 | Joe Hulbig | LW | 1 | 0 | 0 | 0 | 1 | 2 | — | — | — | — | — | — |
| 15 | Dan LaCouture | LW | 3 | 0 | 0 | 0 | 1 | 0 | — | — | — | — | — | — |
| 21 | Daniel Lacroix | LW | 4 | 0 | 0 | 0 | 0 | 13 | — | — | — | — | — | — |
| 35 | Tommy Salo† | G | 13 | 0 | 0 | 0 | | 0 | 4 | 0 | 0 | 0 | | 0 |
| 35 | Mikhail Shtalenkov‡ | G | 34 | 0 | 0 | 0 | | 2 | — | — | — | — | — | — |

=== Goaltending ===
- † = Joined team via a transaction (e.g., trade, waivers, signing) during the season. Stats reflect time with the Oilers only.
- ‡ = Left team via a transaction (e.g., trade, waivers, release) during the season. Stats reflect time with the Oilers only.

| No. | Player | Regular season | | | | | | | | | | Playoffs | | | | | | | | |
| No. | Player | GP | W | L | T | SA | GA | GAA | SV% | SO | TOI | GP | W | L | SA | GA | GAA | SV% | SO | TOI |
|---|---|---|---|---|---|---|---|---|---|---|---|---|---|---|---|---|---|---|---|---|
| 30 | Bob Essensa | 39 | 12 | 14 | 6 | 974 | 96 | 2.76 | .901 | 0 | 2091 | — | — | — | — | — | — | — | — | — |
| 35 | Mikhail Shtalenkov‡ | 34 | 12 | 17 | 3 | 782 | 81 | 2.67 | .896 | 3 | 1819 | — | — | — | — | — | — | — | — | — |
| 35 | Tommy Salo† | 13 | 8 | 2 | 2 | 279 | 27 | 2.32 | .903 | 0 | 700 | 4 | 0 | 4 | 149 | 11 | 2.23 | .926 | 0 | 296 |
| 29 | Steve Passmore | 6 | 1 | 4 | 1 | 183 | 17 | 2.82 | .907 | 0 | 362 | — | — | — | — | — | — | — | — | — |

== Awards and records ==
=== Awards ===
| Type | Award/honour | Recipient | Ref |
|---|---|---|---|
| League (annual) | NHL All-Rookie Team | Tom Poti | |
| League (in-season) | NHL All-Star Game selection | Roman Hamrlik | |
| Team | Community Service Award | Pat Falloon | |
| Team | Defenceman of the Year | Roman Hamrlik | |
| Team | Molson Cup | Bill Guerin | |
| Team | Most Popular Player | Doug Weight | |
| Team | Top Defensive Forward | Todd Marchant | |
| Team | Top First Year Oiler | Tom Poti | |
| Team | Unsung Hero | Mike Grier | |
| Team | Zane Feldman Trophy | Bill Guerin | |

=== Milestones ===
Regular Season
| Player | Milestone | Reached |
| Fredrik Bremberg | 1st NHL Game | October 10, 1998 |
| Tom Poti | 1st NHL Game | October 10, 1998 |
| Ryan Smyth | 200th NHL Game | October 17, 1998 |
| Andrei Kovalenko | 400th NHL Game | October 21, 1998 |
| Mike Grier | 1st NHL Gordie Howe hat trick | October 24, 1998 |
| Sean Brown | 100th NHL PIM | October 31, 1998 |
| Craig Millar | 1st NHL Assist | October 31, 1998 |
| Andrei Kovalenko | 300th NHL PIM | November 8, 1998 |
| Todd Marchant | 300th NHL Game | November 12, 1998 |
| Tom Poti | 1st NHL Goal; 1st NHL Point | November 18, 1998 |
| Kelly Buchberger | 1,700th NHL PIM | November 25, 1998 |
| Tom Poti | 1st NHL Assist | November 29, 1998 |
| Josef Beranek | 100th NHL Assist | December 6, 1998 |
| Bill Guerin | 600th NHL PIM | December 23, 1998 |
| Marty McSorley | 900th NHL Game | December 23, 1998 |
| Boris Mironov | 500th NHL PIM | January 3, 1999 |
| Georges Laraque | 1st NHL Goal; 1st NHL Point | January 7, 1999 |
| Todd Reirden | 1st NHL Game | January 7, 1999 |
| Todd Reirden | 1st NHL Goal; 1st NHL Assist; 1st NHL Point | January 19, 1999 |
| Janne Niinimaa | 100th NHL Point | January 14, 1999 |
| Georges Laraque | 1st NHL Assist | January 17, 1999 |
| Janne Niinimaa | 200th NHL Game | February 1, 1999 |
| Josef Beranek | 200th NHL Point | February 3, 1999 |
| Mike Grier | 200th NHL Game | February 17, 1999 |
| Alexander Selivanov | 1st NHL Hat-trick | February 17, 1999 |
| Dean McAmmond | 100th NHL Assist | February 21, 1999 |
| Dan LaCouture | 1st NHL Game | February 24, 1999 |
| Georges Laraque | 100th NHL PIM | February 24, 1999 |
| Steve Passmore | 1st NHL Game | February 24, 1999 |
| Sean Brown | 200th NHL PIM | February 26, 1999 |
| Dean McAmmond | 300th NHL Game | February 27, 1999 |
| Ryan Smyth | 200th NHL PIM | February 27, 1999 |
| Rem Murray | 200th NHL Game | March 1, 1999 |
| Steve Passmore | 1st NHL Win | March 3, 1999 |
| Steve Passmore | 1st NHL Assist | March 17, 1999 |
| Mike Grier | 1st NHL Hat-trick | March 20, 1999 |
| Marty McSorley | 3,300th NHL PIM | March 20, 1999 |
| Janne Niinimaa | 200th NHL PIM | March 20, 1999 |
| Pat Falloon | 500th NHL Game | March 22, 1999 |
| Bill Guerin | 300th NHL Point | March 22, 1999 |
| Janne Niinimaa | 100th NHL Assist | March 28, 1999 |
| Chad Kilger | 200th NHL Game | March 30, 1999 |
| Bill Guerin | 500th NHL Game | April 12, 1999 |
| Tommy Salo | 200th NHL Game | April 17, 1999 |

Playoffs
| Player | Milestone | Reached |
| Sean Brown | 1st NHL Game | April 21, 1999 |
| Christian Laflamme | 1st NHL Game | April 21, 1999 |
| Georges Laraque | 1st NHL Game | April 21, 1999 |
| Tom Poti | 1st NHL Game | April 21, 1999 |
| Tommy Salo | 1st NHL Game | April 21, 1999 |
| Vladimir Vorobiev | 1st NHL Game | April 21, 1999 |
| Ethan Moreau | 1st NHL Assist | April 23, 1999 |
| Jason Smith | 1st NHL Assist | April 23, 1999 |
| Tom Poti | 1st NHL Assist; 1st NHL Point | April 25, 1999 |
| Boyd Devereaux | 1st NHL Game | April 27, 1999 |
| Christian Laflamme | 1st NHL Assist; 1st NHL Point | April 27, 1999 |

== Transactions ==
=== Trades ===
| June 16, 1998 | To Pittsburgh Penguins Bobby Dollas; Tony Hrkac | To Edmonton Oilers Josef Beranek |
| June 18, 1998 | To New York Islanders Mike Watt | To Edmonton Oilers Éric Fichaud |
| June 27, 1998 | To New Jersey Devils 3rd round pick in 1998 (Brian Gionta) | To Edmonton Oilers Fredrik Bremberg; 4th round pick in 1998; 5th round pick in 1998 |
| October 1, 1998 | To Nashville Predators Drake Berehowsky; Greg de Vries; Eric Fichaud | To Edmonton Oilers Jim Dowd; Mikhail Shtalenkov |
| October 5, 1998 | To Philadelphia Flyers Valeri Zelepukin | To Edmonton Oilers Daniel Lacroix |
| January 29, 1999 | To Philadelphia Flyers Andrei Kovalenko | To Edmonton Oilers Alexandre Daigle |
| January 29, 1999 | To Tampa Bay Lightning Alexandre Daigle | To Edmonton Oilers Alexander Selivanov |
| February 3, 1999 | To Washington Capitals Barrie Moore | To Edmonton Oilers Brad Church |
| March 11, 1999 | To Phoenix Coyotes Mikhail Shtalenkov | To Edmonton Oilers 5th round pick in 2000 |
| March 20, 1999 | To Chicago Blackhawks Boris Mironov; Dean McAmmond; Jonas Elofsson; 2nd round pick in 1999 | To Edmonton Oilers Ethan Moreau; Chad Kilger; Christian Laflamme; Daniel Cleary; 2nd round pick in 1999 |
| March 20, 1999 | To New York Islanders Mats Lindgren; 8th round pick in 1999 | To Edmonton Oilers Tommy Salo |
| March 23, 1999 | To New York Rangers Kevin Brown | To Edmonton Oilers Vladimir Vorobiev |
| March 23, 1999 | To Toronto Maple Leafs 4th round pick in 1999; 2nd round pick in 2000 | To Edmonton Oilers Jason Smith |

=== Players acquired ===
| Date | Player | Former team | Contract terms |
|---|---|---|---|
| August 13, 1998 | Chris Ferraro | Pittsburgh Penguins | 1 year, |
| August 14, 1998 | Kevin Brown | Carolina Hurricanes | 1 year, $330,900 |
| August 21, 1998 | Pat Falloon | Ottawa Senators | 1 year, $297,810 |
| September 10, 1998 | Mike Matteucci | Long Beach Ice Dogs (IHL) | |
| September 17, 1998 | Todd Reirden | New Jersey Devils | 1 year, |
| October 1, 1998 | Marty McSorley | San Jose Sharks | 1 year, $1 million |

=== Players lost ===
| Date | Player | New team |
|---|---|---|
| July 13, 1998 | Terran Sandwith | Mighty Ducks of Anaheim |
| July 15, 1998 | Curtis Joseph | Toronto Maple Leafs |
| July 30, 1998 | Jean-François Labbe | New York Rangers |
| August 18, 1998 | Jesse Belanger | Tampa Bay Lightning |
| August 29, 1998 | Scott Fraser | New York Rangers |
| January 6, 1999 | Fred Brathwaite | Calgary Flames |
| January 11, 1999 | Petr Klíma | Detroit Red Wings |

=== Waivers ===
| Date | Player | Team |
|---|---|---|
| October 5, 1998 | Dennis Bonvie | to Chicago Blackhawks |
| October 5, 1998 | Zdeno Cíger | to Nashville Predators |

== Draft picks ==
Edmonton's draft picks at the 1998 NHL entry draft.

| Round | # | Player | Nationality | College/junior/club team (league) |
|---|---|---|---|---|
| 1 | 13 | Michael Henrich | Canada | Barrie Colts (OHL) |
| 3 | 67 | Alex Henry | Canada | London Knights (OHL) |
| 4 | 99 | Shawn Horcoff | Canada | Michigan State University (CCHA) |
| 4 | 113 | Kristian Antila | Finland | Ilves (Finland) |
| 5 | 128 | Paul Elliott | Canada | Lethbridge Hurricanes (WHL) |
| 5 | 144 | Oleg Smirnov | Russia | Kristall Elektrostal (Russia) |
| 6 | 159 | Trevor Ettinger | Canada | Cape Breton Screaming Eagles (QMJHL) |
| 7 | 186 | Mike Morrison | United States | Exeter High School (USHS–NH) |
| 8 | 213 | Christian Lefebvre | Canada | Baie-Comeau Drakkar (QMJHL) |
| 9 | 241 | Maxim Spiridonov | Russia | London Knights (OHL) |
