= 2000–01 Edmonton Oilers season =

NHL team season

2000–01 Edmonton Oilers
- Division: 2nd Northwest
- Conference: 6th Western
- 2000–01 record: 39–28–12–3
- Home record: 23–9–7–2
- Road record: 16–19–5–1
- Goals for: 243
- Goals against: 222

Team information
- General manager: Kevin Lowe
- Coach: Craig MacTavish
- Captain: Doug Weight
- Alternate captains: Mike Grier (Nov.–Apr.); Bill Guerin (Oct.–Nov.); Todd Marchant (Nov.–Apr.); Rem Murray (Nov.–Apr.); Jason Smith
- Arena: Skyreach Centre
- Average attendance: 15,611 (91.3%)
- Minor league affiliates: Hamilton Bulldogs (AHL); Tallahassee Tiger Sharks (ECHL)

Team leaders
- Goals: Ryan Smyth (31)
- Assists: Doug Weight (65)
- Points: Doug Weight (90)
- Penalty minutes: Georges Laraque (148)
- Plus/minus: Eric Brewer and Igor Ulanov (+15)
- Wins: Tommy Salo (36)
- Goals against average: Tommy Salo (2.46)

The 2000–01 Edmonton Oilers season was the Oilers' 22nd season in the NHL. They were coming off a 32–26–16–8 record in 1999–2000 earning 88 points, their highest point total since 1989–90. They made the playoffs for the fifth-straight season. The Oilers would lose to the Dallas Stars in six games in the first round, the fifth consecutive season the two teams met in the playoffs and their fourth consecutive elimination at the hands of the Stars.

== Off-season ==
During the off-season, general manager Glen Sather announced he was leaving the club to become the general manager of the New York Rangers. Sather had been the Oilers general manager since the 1980–81 season and helped build the teams dynasty of the 1980s, when Edmonton won 5 Stanley Cups in 7 years. Edmonton replaced Sather with Kevin Lowe, who was the team's head coach in 1999–2000, and they named former Oilers player Craig MacTavish as the head coach of the team.

== Regular season ==
Early in the season, the Oilers traded Bill Guerin to the Boston Bruins in exchange for Anson Carter and the Bruins' first two rounds of draft picks in 2001. Guerin had earned 22 points in 21 games with Edmonton at the time, though Carter immediately provided solid scoring for the Oilers, earning 42 points in 61 games.

The highlight of the Oilers season was a nine-game winning streak in mid-February, which helped ensure the team make the playoffs for the fifth-straight season. Edmonton finished the year with 39 wins and 93 points, their highest totals since the 1987–88 season. They finished in the sixth spot in the Western Conference.

Offensively, Doug Weight led the club with 90 points, scoring 25 goals and adding 65 assists. Ryan Smyth scored a team-high 31 goals and added 39 assists to finish the year with 70 points. Janne Niinimaa led the defense with 12 goals and 46 points, while fellow blueliner Tom Poti also scored 12 goals, finishing with 32 points. Georges Laraque led the Oilers in penalty minutes with 148.

In goal, Tommy Salo got the majority of action, winning a career-high 36 games, along with a 2.46 goals against average (GAA) and earning eight shutouts.

=== Season standings ===
Northwest Division
No.	CR		GP	W	L	T	OTL	GF	GA	Pts
1	1	**Colorado Avalanche**	82	52	16	10	4	270	192	118
2	6	**Edmonton Oilers**	82	39	28	12	3	243	222	93
3	8	**Vancouver Canucks**	82	36	28	11	7	239	238	90
4	11	Calgary Flames	82	27	36	15	4	197	236	73
5	14	Minnesota Wild	82	25	39	13	5	168	210	68

Note: CR = Conference rank; GP = Games played; W = Wins; L = Losses; T = Ties; OTL = Overtime loss; GF = Goals for; GA = Goals against; Pts = Points
Bolded teams qualified for the playoffs.

Western Conference
R		Div	GP	W	L	T	OTL	GF	GA	Pts
**1**	**p – Colorado Avalanche**	**NW**	**82**	**52**	**16**	**10**	**4**	**270**	**192**	**118**
**2**	**y – Detroit Red Wings**	**CEN**	**82**	**49**	**20**	**9**	**4**	**253**	**202**	**111**
**3**	**y – Dallas Stars**	**PAC**	**82**	**48**	**24**	**8**	**2**	**241**	**187**	**106**
**4**	**St. Louis Blues**	**CEN**	**82**	**43**	**22**	**12**	**5**	**249**	**195**	**103**
**5**	**San Jose Sharks**	**PAC**	**82**	**40**	**27**	**12**	**3**	**217**	**192**	**95**
**6**	**Edmonton Oilers**	**NW**	**82**	**39**	**28**	**12**	**3**	**243**	**222**	**93**
**7**	**Los Angeles Kings**	**PAC**	**82**	**38**	**28**	**13**	**3**	**252**	**228**	**92**
**8**	**Vancouver Canucks**	**NW**	**82**	**36**	**28**	**11**	**7**	**239**	**238**	**90**
8.5
9	Phoenix Coyotes	PAC	82	35	27	17	3	214	212	90
10	Nashville Predators	CEN	82	34	36	9	3	186	200	80
11	Calgary Flames	NW	82	27	36	15	4	197	236	73
12	Chicago Blackhawks	CEN	82	29	40	8	5	210	246	71
13	Columbus Blue Jackets	CEN	82	28	39	9	6	190	233	71
14	Minnesota Wild	NW	82	25	39	13	5	168	210	68
15	Mighty Ducks of Anaheim	PAC	82	25	41	11	5	188	245	66

Divisions: CEN – Central, PAC – Pacific, NW – Northwest

bold – Qualified for playoffs; p – Won Presidents' Trophy; y – Won division

== Playoffs ==
The Oilers opened the playoffs against the Dallas Stars, making it the fifth-straight year that the two clubs would face each other, including the third-straight time in the first round. The teams split the first two games in Dallas, and then split the two games in Edmonton, with both games in Edmonton being decided in overtime. Game 5 also went into overtime, with Dallas winning the game 4–3, and taking a 3–2 series lead. Game 6 returned to Edmonton, and the Stars held off the Oilers and won the game 3–1 and the series 4–2, eliminating the Oilers for the fourth-straight season.

== Schedule and results ==
=== Regular season ===
2000–01 regular season
October: 6–5–2–0 (home: 4–2–2–0; road: 2–3–0–0)

Game	Date	Visitor	Score	Home	OT	Decision	Attendance	Record	Pts	Recap
1	October 6	Detroit Red Wings	1 – 2	Edmonton Oilers		Salo	15,897	1–0–0–0	2	W
2	October 7	Colorado Avalanche	1 – 1	Edmonton Oilers	OT	Salo	15,158	1–0–1–0	3	T
3	October 10	Edmonton Oilers	2 – 5	Montreal Canadiens		Salo	20,108	1–1–1–0	3	L
4	October 11	Edmonton Oilers	4 – 3	Detroit Red Wings		Salo	19,995	2–1–1–0	5	W
5	October 13	Buffalo Sabres	2 – 3	Edmonton Oilers		Salo	13,002	3–1–1–0	7	W
6	October 15	Edmonton Oilers	5 – 3	Minnesota Wild		Gage	18,064	4–1–1–0	9	W
7	October 17	Boston Bruins	1 – 6	Edmonton Oilers		Salo	12,377	5–1–1–0	11	W
8	October 19	Toronto Maple Leafs	4 – 1	Edmonton Oilers		Salo	17,100	5–2–1–0	11	L
9	October 22	Phoenix Coyotes	3 – 3	Edmonton Oilers	OT	Salo	14,003	5–2–2–0	12	T
10	October 25	Atlanta Thrashers	3 – 1	Edmonton Oilers		Gage	11,576	5–3–2–0	12	L
11	October 27	Edmonton Oilers	2 – 3	Mighty Ducks of Anaheim		Salo	13,592	5–4–2–0	12	L
12	October 28	Edmonton Oilers	2 – 4	Colorado Avalanche		Salo	18,007	5–5–2–0	12	L
13	October 30	Mighty Ducks of Anaheim	3 – 5	Edmonton Oilers		Salo	12,002	6–5–2–0	14	W

November: 8–5–1–0 (home: 5–1–1–0; road: 3–4–0–0)

Game	Date	Visitor	Score	Home	OT	Decision	Attendance	Record	Pts	Recap
14	November 1	Calgary Flames	2 – 3	Edmonton Oilers		Salo	15,206	7–5–2–0	16	W
15	November 3	Minnesota Wild	0 – 3	Edmonton Oilers		Salo	12,811	8–5–2–0	18	W
16	November 5	Edmonton Oilers	4 – 2	Columbus Blue Jackets		Salo	16,041	9–5–2–0	20	W
17	November 7	Edmonton Oilers	3 – 4	New York Rangers		Salo	18,200	9–6–2–0	20	L
18	November 9	Edmonton Oilers	0 – 2	Philadelphia Flyers		Salo	19,418	9–7–2–0	20	L
19	November 11	Edmonton Oilers	2 – 5	Pittsburgh Penguins		Salo	16,653	9–8–2–0	20	L
20	November 12	Edmonton Oilers	5 – 4	Minnesota Wild	OT	Gage	18,064	10–8–2–0	22	W
21	November 14	St. Louis Blues	0 – 3	Edmonton Oilers		Salo	12,512	11–8–2–0	24	W
22	November 17	Chicago Blackhawks	3 – 3	Edmonton Oilers	OT	Salo	16,002	11–8–3–0	25	T
23	November 19	Calgary Flames	0 – 2	Edmonton Oilers		Salo	17,100	12–8–3–0	27	W
24	November 22	Edmonton Oilers	3 – 4	Toronto Maple Leafs		Salo	19,212	12–9–3–0	27	L
25	November 23	Edmonton Oilers	5 – 3	Ottawa Senators		Salo	18,087	13–9–3–0	29	W
26	November 25	Mighty Ducks of Anaheim	2 – 3	Edmonton Oilers		Salo	17,100	14–9–3–0	31	W
27	November 29	Montreal Canadiens	3 – 2	Edmonton Oilers		Salo	16,418	14–10–3–0	31	L

December: 4–5–3–1 (home: 3–1–1–0; road: 1–4–2–1)

Game	Date	Visitor	Score	Home	OT	Decision	Attendance	Record	Pts	Recap
28	December 2	Edmonton Oilers	2 – 5	Vancouver Canucks		Salo	18,422	14–11–3–0	31	L
29	December 3	San Jose Sharks	3 – 3	Edmonton Oilers	OT	Salo	13,739	14–11–4–0	32	T
30	December 6	Nashville Predators	0 – 4	Edmonton Oilers		Salo	13,113	15–11–4–0	34	W
31	December 9	Los Angeles Kings	4 – 2	Edmonton Oilers		Salo	16,619	15–12–4–0	34	L
32	December 13	Edmonton Oilers	2 – 5	Dallas Stars		Salo	17,001	15–13–4–0	34	L
33	December 14	Edmonton Oilers	6 – 2	Nashville Predators		Salo	14,184	16–13–4–0	36	W
34	December 16	Edmonton Oilers	0 – 4	Washington Capitals		Gage	15,036	16–14–4–0	36	L
35	December 18	Edmonton Oilers	3 – 4	Detroit Red Wings	OT	Salo	19,995	16–14–4–1	37	OTL
36	December 20	Vancouver Canucks	2 – 3	Edmonton Oilers	OT	Salo	16,401	17–14–4–1	39	W
37	December 22	Edmonton Oilers	1 – 1	Calgary Flames	OT	Salo	17,139	17–14–5–1	40	T
38	December 27	Edmonton Oilers	2 – 3	Colorado Avalanche		Salo	18,007	17–15–5–1	40	L
39	December 28	Edmonton Oilers	2 – 2	San Jose Sharks	OT	Salo	17,496	17–15–6–1	41	T
40	December 30	Montreal Canadiens	2 – 3	Edmonton Oilers	OT	Salo	17,100	18–15–6–1	43	W

January: 7–6–2–0 (home: 4–2–2–0; road: 3–4–0–0)

Game	Date	Visitor	Score	Home	OT	Decision	Attendance	Record	Pts	Recap
41	January 1	Edmonton Oilers	2 – 5	St. Louis Blues		Salo	19,686	18–16–6–1	43	L
42	January 3	Edmonton Oilers	2 – 5	Columbus Blue Jackets		Salo	15,217	18–17–6–1	43	L
43	January 5	Edmonton Oilers	2 – 1	Chicago Blackhawks		Salo	16,416	19–17–6–1	45	W
44	January 7	Columbus Blue Jackets	2 – 4	Edmonton Oilers		Salo	14,186	20–17–6–1	47	W
45	January 10	Nashville Predators	5 – 2	Edmonton Oilers		Salo	13,615	20–18–6–1	47	L
46	January 12	Vancouver Canucks	3 – 2	Edmonton Oilers		Salo	17,100	20–19–6–1	47	L
47	January 14	Ottawa Senators	1 – 4	Edmonton Oilers		Roussel	16,362	21–19–6–1	49	W
48	January 16	Edmonton Oilers	2 – 1	Nashville Predators		Salo	14,525	22–19–6–1	51	W
49	January 18	Edmonton Oilers	1 – 4	St. Louis Blues		Roussel	19,184	22–20–6–1	51	L
50	January 20	Detroit Red Wings	1 – 2	Edmonton Oilers		Salo	17,100	23–20–6–1	53	W
51	January 22	San Jose Sharks	2 – 2	Edmonton Oilers	OT	Salo	15,300	23–20–7–1	54	T
52	January 24	Edmonton Oilers	1 – 6	San Jose Sharks		Roussel	17,496	23–21–7–1	54	L
53	January 26	Phoenix Coyotes	1 – 1	Edmonton Oilers	OT	Salo	16,669	23–21–8–1	55	T
54	January 30	Edmonton Oilers	5 – 3	Calgary Flames		Salo	17,139	24–21–8–1	57	W
55	January 31	Chicago Blackhawks	2 – 3	Edmonton Oilers		Salo	15,378	25–21–8–1	59	W

February: 5–3–1–1 (home: 3–1–0–1; road: 2–2–1–0)

Game	Date	Visitor	Score	Home	OT	Decision	Attendance	Record	Pts	Recap
56	February 7	Edmonton Oilers	2 – 3	Dallas Stars		Salo	17,001	25–22–8–1	59	L
57	February 9	Edmonton Oilers	0 – 2	Phoenix Coyotes		Salo	15,070	25–23–8–1	59	L
58	February 12	Edmonton Oilers	6 – 3	Los Angeles Kings		Salo	14,059	26–23–8–1	61	W
59	February 14	Edmonton Oilers	3 – 3	Mighty Ducks of Anaheim	OT	Salo	11,307	26–23–9–1	62	T
60	February 16	New York Islanders	4 – 2	Edmonton Oilers		Roussel	16,801	26–24–9–1	62	L
61	February 17	Vancouver Canucks	6 – 5	Edmonton Oilers	OT	Salo	17,100	26–24–9–2	63	OTL
62	February 20	Los Angeles Kings	0 – 5	Edmonton Oilers		Salo	16,349	27–24–9–2	65	W
63	February 24	Edmonton Oilers	3 – 1	Calgary Flames		Salo	17,139	28–24–9–2	67	W
64	February 25	Dallas Stars	2 – 3	Edmonton Oilers	OT	Salo	17,100	29–24–9–2	69	W
65	February 28	St. Louis Blues	3 – 5	Edmonton Oilers		Salo	16,346	30–24–9–2	71	W

March: 8–3–1–1 (home: 4–2–0–1; road: 4–1–1–0)

Game	Date	Visitor	Score	Home	OT	Decision	Attendance	Record	Pts	Recap
66	March 2	Minnesota Wild	1 – 3	Edmonton Oilers		Salo	16,280	31–24–9–2	73	W
67	March 7	Toronto Maple Leafs	0 – 4	Edmonton Oilers		Salo	17,100	32–24–9–2	75	W
68	March 9	Edmonton Oilers	4 – 0	Buffalo Sabres		Salo	18,690	33–24–9–2	77	W
69	March 11	Edmonton Oilers	3 – 2	Carolina Hurricanes		Salo	13,124	34–24–9–2	79	W
70	March 13	Edmonton Oilers	5 – 4	Tampa Bay Lightning	OT	Salo	14,596	35–24–9–2	81	W
71	March 14	Edmonton Oilers	2 – 2	Florida Panthers	OT	Salo	13,100	35–24–10–2	82	T
72	March 17	New Jersey Devils	6 – 5	Edmonton Oilers	OT	Salo	17,100	35–24–10–3	83	OTL
73	March 19	Philadelphia Flyers	4 – 2	Edmonton Oilers		Roussel	17,100	35–25–10–3	83	L
74	March 21	Edmonton Oilers	7 – 0	Los Angeles Kings		Salo	15,666	36–25–10–3	85	W
75	March 24	Edmonton Oilers	4 – 7	Phoenix Coyotes		Salo	15,318	36–26–10–3	85	L
76	March 26	Columbus Blue Jackets	2 – 4	Edmonton Oilers		Salo	16,563	37–26–10–3	87	W
77	March 28	Colorado Avalanche	1 – 4	Edmonton Oilers		Salo	17,100	38–26–10–3	89	W
78	March 30	Dallas Stars	5 – 4	Edmonton Oilers		Salo	17,100	38–27–10–3	89	L

April: 1–1–2–0 (home: 0–0–1–0; road: 1–1–1–0)

Game	Date	Visitor	Score	Home	OT	Decision	Attendance	Record	Pts	Recap
79	April 1	Edmonton Oilers	3 – 3	Chicago Blackhawks	OT	Salo	14,387	38–27–11–3	90	T
80	April 2	Edmonton Oilers	3 – 5	Colorado Avalanche		Salo	18,007	38–28–11–3	90	L
81	April 4	Minnesota Wild	2 – 2	Edmonton Oilers	OT	Salo	17,100	38–28–12–3	91	T
82	April 7	Edmonton Oilers	4 – 2	Vancouver Canucks		Salo	18,422	39–28–12–3	93	W

Legend: W Win (2 points) L Loss (0 points) T Tie (1 point) OTL Overtime loss (1 point)

=== Playoffs ===
2001 Stanley Cup playoffs
Western Conference Quarterfinals vs. (3) Dallas Stars – Stars win 4–2

Game	Date	Visitor	Score	Home	OT	Decision	Attendance	Series	Recap
1	April 11	Edmonton Oilers	1 – 2	Dallas Stars	OT	Salo	17,001	0–1	L
2	April 14	Edmonton Oilers	4 – 3	Dallas Stars		Salo	17,001	1–1	W
3	April 15	Dallas Stars	3 – 2	Edmonton Oilers	OT	Salo	17,100	1–2	L
4	April 17	Dallas Stars	1 – 2	Edmonton Oilers	OT	Salo	17,100	2–2	W
5	April 19	Edmonton Oilers	3 – 4	Dallas Stars	OT	Salo	17,001	2–3	L
6	April 21	Dallas Stars	3 – 1	Edmonton Oilers		Salo	17,100	2–4	L

Legend: W Win L Loss

== Player statistics ==
=== Scoring ===
- Position abbreviations: C = Centre; D = Defence; G = Goaltender; LW = Left wing; RW = Right wing
- † = Joined team via a transaction (e.g., trade, waivers, signing) during the season. Stats reflect time with the Oilers only.
- ‡ = Left team via a transaction (e.g., trade, waivers, release) during the season. Stats reflect time with the Oilers only.

No.	Player	Pos	Regular season						Playoffs					
No.	Player	Pos	GP	G	A	Pts	+/-	PIM	GP	G	A	Pts	+/-	PIM
39	Doug Weight	C	82	25	65	90	12	91	6	1	5	6	0	17
94	Ryan Smyth	RW	82	31	39	70	10	58	6	3	4	7	0	4
44	Janne Niinimaa	D	82	12	34	46	6	90	6	0	2	2	−1	6
22	Anson Carter†	LW	61	16	26	42	1	23	6	3	1	4	1	4
26	Todd Marchant	C	71	13	26	39	1	51	6	0	0	0	−3	4
25	Mike Grier	RW	74	20	16	36	11	20	6	0	0	0	−2	8
17	Rem Murray	LW	82	15	21	36	5	24	6	2	0	2	−2	6
7	Daniel Cleary	RW	81	14	21	35	5	37	6	1	1	2	−2	8
5	Tom Poti	D	81	12	20	32	−4	60	6	0	2	2	2	2
27	Georges Laraque	RW	82	13	16	29	5	148	6	1	1	2	2	8
55	Igor Ulanov	D	67	3	20	23	15	90	6	0	0	0	−6	4
9	Bill Guerin‡	RW	21	12	10	22	11	18	—	—	—	—	—	—
89	Mike Comrie	C	41	8	14	22	6	14	6	1	2	3	0	0
2	Eric Brewer	D	77	7	14	21	15	53	6	1	5	6	−3	2
21	Jason Smith	D	82	5	15	20	14	120	6	0	2	2	−3	6
34	Sergei Zholtok†	C	37	4	16	20	8	22	3	0	0	0	−1	0
18	Ethan Moreau	LW	68	9	10	19	−6	90	4	0	0	0	−2	2
36	Shawn Horcoff	RW	49	9	7	16	8	10	5	0	0	0	0	0
14	Domenic Pittis	C	47	4	5	9	−5	49	3	0	0	0	−1	2
15	Chad Kilger‡	C	34	5	2	7	−7	17	—	—	—	—	—	—
33	Dan LaCouture‡	LW	37	2	4	6	−2	29	—	—	—	—	—	—
23	Sean Brown	D	62	2	3	5	2	110	—	—	—	—	—	—
19	Sven Butenschon†	D	7	1	1	2	2	2	—	—	—	—	—	—
37	Brian Swanson	C	16	1	1	2	−1	6	—	—	—	—	—	—
8	Frank Musil	D	13	0	2	2	−2	4	—	—	—	—	—	—
32	Scott Ferguson	D	20	0	1	1	2	13	6	0	0	0	2	0
34	Michel Riesen	RW	12	0	1	1	2	4	—	—	—	—	—	—
35	Tommy Salo	G	73	0	1	1		4	6	0	0	0		0
20	Jason Chimera	C	1	0	0	0	0	0	—	—	—	—	—	—
29	Patrick Cote	LW	6	0	0	0	−2	18	—	—	—	—	—	—
31	Joaquin Gage	G	5	0	0	0		0	—	—	—	—	—	—
19	Chris Hajt	D	1	0	0	0	−1	0	—	—	—	—	—	—
30	Dominic Roussel†	G	8	0	0	0		2	—	—	—	—	—	—
12	Josh Green	LW	—	—	—	—	—	—	3	0	0	0	1	0

=== Goaltending ===
- † = Joined team via a transaction (e.g., trade, waivers, signing) during the season. Stats reflect time with the Oilers only.

No.	Player	Regular season										Playoffs								
No.	Player	GP	W	L	T	SA	GA	GAA	SV%	SO	TOI	GP	W	L	SA	GA	GAA	SV%	SO	TOI
35	Tommy Salo	73	36	25	12	1856	179	2.46	.904	8	4364	6	2	4	187	15	2.22	.920	0	406
31	Joaquin Gage	5	2	2	0	125	15	3.46	.880	0	260	—	—	—	—	—	—	—	—	—
30	Dominic Roussel†	8	1	4	0	151	21	3.62	.861	0	348	—	—	—	—	—	—	—	—	—

== Awards and records ==
=== Awards ===
Type	Award/honor	Recipient	Ref
League (in-season)	NHL All-Star Game selection	Janne Niinimaa	
League (in-season)	NHL All-Star Game selection	Doug Weight	
League (in-season)	NHL Player of the Week	Tommy Salo (November 20)	
League (in-season)	NHL Player of the Week	Tommy Salo (March 12)	
Team	Community Service Award	Not awarded	
Team	Defenceman of the Year	Jason Smith	
Team	Molson Cup	Tommy Salo	
Team	Most Popular Player	Doug Weight	
Team	Top Defensive Forward	Todd Marchant	
Team	Top First Year Oiler	Not awarded	
Team	Unsung Hero	Not awarded	
Team	Zane Feldman Trophy	Tommy Salo	

=== Milestones ===
Regular Season
Player	Milestone	Reached
Janne Niinimaa	300th NHL PIM	October 6, 2000
Michel Riesen	1st NHL Game	October 6, 2000
Brian Swanson	1st NHL Game	October 6, 2000
Chris Hajt	1st NHL Game	October 11, 2000
Tommy Salo	100th NHL Win	October 13, 2000
Michel Riesen	1st NHL Assist; 1st NHL Point	October 15, 2000
Brian Swanson	1st NHL Assist; 1st NHL Point	October 15, 2000
Jason Smith	400th NHL PIM	October 15, 2000
Brian Swanson	1st NHL Goal	October 17, 2000
Mike Grier	300th NHL Game	October 19, 2000
Ryan Smyth	200th NHL Point	October 27, 2000
Patrick Cote	100th NHL Game	October 28, 2000
Eric Brewer	100th NHL Game	November 5, 2000
Ethan Moreau	300th NHL Game	November 7, 2000
Igor Ulanov	500th NHL Game	November 7, 2000
Ryan Smyth	3rd NHL Hat-trick; 2nd NHL Natural Hat-trick	November 14, 2000
Georges Laraque	300th NHL PIM	December 3, 2000
Ryan Smyth	100th NHL Assist	December 3, 2000
Shawn Horcoff	1st NHL Game; 1st NHL Assist; 1st NHL Point	December 6, 2000
Tommy Salo	20th NHL Shutout	December 6, 2000
Jason Chimera	1st NHL Game	December 9, 2000
Shawn Horcoff	1st NHL Goal	December 13, 2000
Ethan Moreau	100th NHL Point	December 14, 2000
Tommy Salo	300th NHL Game	December 14, 2000
Daniel Cleary	100th NHL Game	December 16, 2000
Rem Murray	300th NHL Game	December 18, 2000
Ryan Smyth	300th NHL PIM	December 18, 2000
Doug Weight	600th NHL Point	December 27, 2000
Mike Comrie	1st NHL Game	December 30, 2000
Ethan Moreau	400th NHL PIM	January 5, 2000
Mike Comrie	1st NHL Assist; 1st NHL Point	January 10, 2001
Ryan Smyth	4th NHL Hat-trick	January 14, 2001
Ryan Smyth	400th NHL Game	January 18, 2001
Mike Comrie	1st NHL Goal	January 20, 2001
Sean Brown	500th NHL PIM	January 24, 2001
Tom Poti	200th NHL Game	January 24, 2001
Dominic Roussel	200th NHL Game	January 24, 2001
Sean Brown	200th NHL Game	February 12, 2001
Igor Ulanov	100th NHL Assist	February 14, 2001
Todd Marchant	500th NHL Game	February 20, 2001
Todd Marchant	100th NHL Goal	February 25, 2001
Rem Murray	100th NHL PIM	March 9, 2001
Eric Brewer	100th NHL PIM	March 14, 2001
Georges Laraque	200th NHL Game	March 21, 2001
Sergei Zholtok	100th NHL PIM	March 21, 2001
Doug Weight	600th NHL PIM	March 24, 2001
Doug Weight	700th NHL Game	March 26, 2001
Anson Carter	100th NHL Assist	March 28, 2001
Sven Butenschon	1st NHL Goal	April 7, 2001
Todd Marchant	400th NHL PIM	April 7, 2001
Jason Smith	500th NHL Game; 500th NHL PIM	April 7, 2001

Playoffs
Player	Milestone	Reached
Eric Brewer	1st NHL Game	April 11, 2001
Mike Comrie	1st NHL Game	April 11, 2001
Scott Ferguson	1st NHL Game	April 11, 2001
Shawn Horcoff	1st NHL Game	April 11, 2001
Eric Brewer	1st NHL Assist; 1st NHL Point	April 14, 2001
Daniel Cleary	1st NHL Goal	April 14, 2001
Georges Laraque	1st NHL Goal	April 14, 2001
Josh Green	1st NHL Game	April 15, 2001
Domenic Pittis	1st NHL Game	April 15, 2001
Mike Comrie	1st NHL Goal; 1st NHL Assist; 1st NHL Point	April 17, 2001
Doug Weight	50th NHL PIM	April 17, 2001
Eric Brewer	1st NHL Goal	April 19, 2001

== Transactions ==
The Oilers were involved in the following transactions from June 11, 2000, the day after the deciding game of the 2000 Stanley Cup Final, through June 9, 2001, the day of the deciding game of the 2001 Stanley Cup Final.

=== Trades ===
Date	Details		Ref
June 12, 2000	To Nashville Predators: 5th-round pick in 2000	To Edmonton Oilers: Patrick Cote	
June 24, 2000	To New York Islanders: Roman Hamrlik	To Edmonton Oilers: Eric Brewer; Josh Green; 2nd-round pick in 2000	
June 25, 2000	To Boston Bruins: 9th-round pick in 2000	To Edmonton Oilers: 9th-round pick in 2001	
July 20, 2000	To Boston Bruins: Kay Whitmore	To Edmonton Oilers: Future considerations	
November 15, 2000	To Boston Bruins: Bill Guerin	To Edmonton Oilers: Rights to Anson Carter; Option to switch 1st-round picks in 2001 or 2002; 2nd-round pick in 2001; Future considerations	
December 18, 2000	To Montreal Canadiens: Chad Kilger	To Edmonton Oilers: Sergei Zholtok	
January 12, 2001	To Nashville Predators: Future considerations	To Edmonton Oilers: Rory Fitzpatrick	
March 13, 2001	To Pittsburgh Penguins: Dan LaCouture	To Edmonton Oilers: Sven Butenschon	

=== Players acquired ===
Date	Player	Former team	Term	Via	Ref
July 5, 2000	Scott Ferguson	Anaheim Mighty Ducks	2-year	Free agency	
July 19, 2000	Terran Sandwith	Toronto Maple Leafs	1-year	Free agency	
July 25, 2000	Joaquin Gage	Hamilton Bulldogs (AHL)	1-year	Free agency	
July 26, 2000	Domenic Pittis	Buffalo Sabres	2-year	Free agency	
August 31, 2000	Paul Healey	Nashville Predators	1-year	Free agency	
January 10, 2001	Dominic Roussel	Anaheim Mighty Ducks		Waivers	
March 6, 2001	Sean McAslan	Calgary Hitmen (WHL)	3-year	Free agency	
April 18, 2001	Ty Conklin	University of New Hampshire (HE)	3-year	Free agency	
May 29, 2001	Marc-Andre Bergeron	Shawinigan Cataractes (QMJHL)	3-year	Free agency	
May 29, 2001	Kevin McDonald	Roanoke Express (ECHL)	1-year	Free agency	
May 29, 2001	Craig Reichert	Dusseldorfer EG (DEL)	2-year	Free agency	

=== Players lost ===
Date	Player	New team	Via (Note: In parentheses is the player's free agency group on July 1 if applicable.)	Ref
N/A	Vladimir Vorobiev	Severstal Cherepovets (RSL)	Free agency (VI)	
June 23, 2000	Jim Dowd	Minnesota Wild	Expansion draft	
June 23, 2000	Bert Robertsson	Columbus Blue Jackets	Expansion draft	
July 1, 2000	German Titov	Anaheim Mighty Ducks	Free agency (III)	
July 24, 2000	Rob Murray	Philadelphia Flyers	Free agency (UFA)	
August 14, 2000	Michel Picard	Philadelphia Flyers	Free agency (UFA)	
August 23, 2000	Boyd Devereaux	Detroit Red Wings	Free agency (UFA)	
September 10, 2000	Kevin Brown	Manchester Storm (BISL)	Free agency (VI)	
N/A	Mike Minard	St. John's Maple Leafs (AHL)	Free agency (UFA)	
November 7, 2000	Adam Copeland	Tallahassee Tiger Sharks (ECHL)	Free agency (UFA)	
November 22, 2000	Alexander Selivanov	Columbus Blue Jackets	Free agency (UFA)	

=== Signings ===
Date	Player	Term	Contract type	Ref
July 13, 2000	Josh Green		Re-signing	
July 13, 2000	Alexei Semenov		Entry-level	
July 26, 2000	Brad Norton	1-year	Re-signing	
July 27, 2000	Igor Ulanov	1-year	Re-signing	
August 8, 2000	Todd Marchant	2-year	Re-signing	
August 12, 2000	Jason Smith	2-year	Re-signing	
August 15, 2000	Sean Brown	1-year (Note: Club option for second year.)	Re-signing	
August 18, 2000	Mike Grier	2-year	Re-signing	
August 23, 2000	Dan LaCouture	1-year	Re-signing	
August 24, 2000	Ethan Moreau	3-year	Re-signing	
August 31, 2000	Alain Nasreddine		Re-signing	
September 5, 2000	Shawn Horcoff	3-year	Entry-level	
September 5, 2000	Rem Murray	3-year	Re-signing	
September 7, 2000	Doug Weight	1-year	Re-signing	
September 8, 2000	Georges Laraque	3-year	Re-signing	
September 23, 2000	Ryan Smyth	3-year	Re-signing	
November 2, 2000	Tommy Salo	3-year (Note: Club option for two additional years.)	Extension	
November 15, 2000	Anson Carter	2-year	Re-signing	
December 30, 2000	Mike Comrie	3-year	Entry-level	

== Draft picks ==
Edmonton's draft picks at the 2000 NHL entry draft.

Round	#	Player	Nationality	College/Junior/Club team (League)
1	17	Alexei Mikhnov	Russia	Yaroslavl Torpedo (Russia)
2	35	Brad Winchester	United States	University of Wisconsin–Madison Badgers (NCAA)
3	83	Alexander Lyubimov	Russia	Samara CSK VVS (Russia)
4	113	Lou Dickenson	Canada	Mississauga IceDogs (OHL)
5	152	Paul Flache	Canada	Brampton Battalion (OHL)
6	184	Shaun Norrie	Canada	Calgary Hitmen (WHL)
7	211	Joe Cullen	United States	Colorado College Tigers (NCAA)
7	215	Matthew Lombardi	Canada	Victoriaville Tigres (QMJHL)
8	247	Jason Platt	United States	Omaha Lancers (USHL)
9	274	Evgeny Muratov	Russia	Ak Bars Kazan (Russia)
