= 1999–2000 Edmonton Oilers season =

NHL team season

1999–2000 Edmonton Oilers
- Division: 2nd Northwest
- Conference: 7th Western
- 1999–2000 record: 32–26–16–8
- Home record: 18–11–9–3
- Road record: 14–15–7–5
- Goals for: 226
- Goals against: 212

Team information
- General manager: Glen Sather
- Coach: Kevin Lowe
- Captain: Doug Weight
- Alternate captains: Bill Guerin; Jason Smith
- Arena: Skyreach Centre
- Average attendance: 15,800 (92.4%)
- Minor league affiliates: Hamilton Bulldogs (AHL); Tallahassee Tiger Sharks (ECHL)

Team leaders
- Goals: Ryan Smyth (28)
- Assists: Doug Weight (51)
- Points: Doug Weight (72)
- Penalty minutes: Sean Brown (192)
- Plus/minus: Jason Smith (+16)
- Wins: Tommy Salo (27)
- Goals against average: Tommy Salo (2.33)

The 1999–2000 Edmonton Oilers season was the Oilers' 21st season in the NHL, and they were coming off a 33–37–12 record in 1998–99, earning their third-straight playoff appearance. However, they were defeated in the first round by the eventual Western Conference Champions, the Dallas Stars.

The Oilers did not bring back Head Coach Ron Low, who had been with the team since 1995, and hired former Oilers defenceman Kevin Lowe as his replacement. Lowe played with Edmonton from 1979 to 1992, and then again from 1996 to 1998, winning five Stanley Cups with the team, and scored the first NHL goal in Oilers history.

Edmonton saw its win total drop to 32; however, it earned 88 points, the team's highest point total since the Stanley Cup-winning 1989–90 season, and qualified for the playoffs for the fourth-straight season, finishing in seventh place in the Western Conference.

Offensively, newly named captain Doug Weight rebounded from his injury-plagued 1998–99 season and led the club with 51 assists and 72 points. Ryan Smyth was the Oilers' goal-scoring leader, with 28 goals. Alexander Selivanov scored 27 goals and 47 points in his first full season with the Oilers, while Bill Guerin scored 24 goals. Defenceman Roman Hamrlik led the blueline with 45 points, while second-year player Tom Poti scored nine goals and earned 35 points. Sean Brown led the club in penalty minutes once again, with 192.

In goal, Tommy Salo got the bulk of the action, winning 27 games, while recording a goals against average (GAA) of 2.33, earning two shutouts along the way.

The Oilers opened the playoffs against the Dallas Stars, the fourth-straight season that these teams faced each other. The Stars finished in second place in the Western Conference with 102 points, 14 points higher than the Oilers. The Stars earned a 2–0 series lead by winning both games in Dallas; however, the Oilers cut the lead in half with a 5–2 victory in Game 3 at Skyreach Centre. Dallas won Game 4 by a 4–3 score, earning them a 3–1 lead. They then finished off the series in Game 5 in Dallas, ending the Oilers' season for the third year in a row.

== Season standings ==
Northwest Division
No.	CR		GP	W	L	T	OTL	GF	GA	Pts
1	3	**Colorado Avalanche**	82	42	28	11	1	233	201	96
2	7	**Edmonton Oilers**	82	32	26	16	8	226	212	88
3	10	Vancouver Canucks	82	30	29	15	8	227	237	83
4	12	Calgary Flames	82	31	36	10	5	211	256	77

Note: CR = Conference rank; GP = Games played; W = Wins; L = Losses; T = Ties; OTL = Overtime loss; GF = Goals for; GA = Goals against; PIM = Penalties in minutes; Pts = Points
Bolded teams qualified for the playoffs.

Western Conference
R		Div	GP	W	L	T	OTL	GF	GA	Pts
**1**	**p – St. Louis Blues**	**CEN**	**82**	**51**	**19**	**11**	**1**	**248**	**165**	**114**
**2**	**y – Dallas Stars**	**PAC**	**82**	**43**	**23**	**10**	**6**	**211**	**184**	**102**
**3**	**y – Colorado Avalanche**	**NW**	**82**	**42**	**28**	**11**	**1**	**233**	**201**	**96**
**4**	**Detroit Red Wings**	**CEN**	**82**	**48**	**22**	**10**	**2**	**278**	**210**	**108**
**5**	**Los Angeles Kings**	**PAC**	**82**	**39**	**27**	**12**	**4**	**245**	**228**	**94**
**6**	**Phoenix Coyotes**	**PAC**	**82**	**39**	**31**	**8**	**4**	**232**	**228**	**90**
**7**	**Edmonton Oilers**	**NW**	**82**	**32**	**26**	**16**	**8**	**226**	**212**	**88**
**8**	**San Jose Sharks**	**PAC**	**82**	**35**	**30**	**10**	**7**	**225**	**214**	**87**
8.5
9	Mighty Ducks of Anaheim	PAC	82	34	33	12	3	217	227	83
10	Vancouver Canucks	NW	82	30	29	15	8	227	237	83
11	Chicago Blackhawks	CEN	82	33	37	10	2	242	245	78
12	Calgary Flames	NW	82	31	36	10	5	211	256	77
13	Nashville Predators	CEN	82	28	40	7	7	199	240	70

Divisions: CEN – Central, PAC – Pacific, NW – Northwest

bold – Qualified for playoffs; p – Won Presidents' Trophy; y – Won division

== Schedule and results ==
=== Regular season ===
1999–2000 regular season
October: 4–3–2–2 (home: 4–1–2–0; road: 0–2–0–2)

Game	Date	Visitor	Score	Home	OT	Decision	Attendance	Record	Pts	Recap
1	October 1	New York Rangers	1 – 1	Edmonton Oilers	OT	Salo	17,100	0–0–1–0	1	T
2	October 6	Montreal Canadiens	1 – 2	Edmonton Oilers		Salo	16,052	1–0–1–0	3	W
3	October 7	Edmonton Oilers	2 – 3	San Jose Sharks	OT	Ranford	16,301	1–0–1–1	4	OTL
4	October 9	St. Louis Blues	4 – 2	Edmonton Oilers		Salo	14,236	1–1–1–1	4	L
5	October 13	Carolina Hurricanes	3 – 3	Edmonton Oilers	OT	Ranford	13,372	1–1–2–1	5	T
6	October 16	Los Angeles Kings	4 – 5	Edmonton Oilers		Salo	16,094	2–1–2–1	7	W
7	October 20	Edmonton Oilers	1 – 2	Dallas Stars		Salo	17,001	2–2–2–1	7	L
8	October 21	Edmonton Oilers	2 – 3	St. Louis Blues	OT	Salo	15,530	2–2–2–2	8	OTL
9	October 23	Edmonton Oilers	3 – 4	Nashville Predators		Ranford	16,822	2–3–2–2	8	L
10	October 26	Phoenix Coyotes	1 – 3	Edmonton Oilers		Salo	13,390	3–3–2–2	10	W
11	October 31	Nashville Predators	2 – 4	Edmonton Oilers		Salo	13,323	4–3–2–2	12	W

November: 2–5–4–1 (home: 1–2–2–0; road: 1–3–2–1)

Game	Date	Visitor	Score	Home	OT	Decision	Attendance	Record	Pts	Recap
12	November 3	Florida Panthers	2 – 2	Edmonton Oilers	OT	Salo	13,646	4–3–3–2	13	T
13	November 5	St. Louis Blues	2 – 1	Edmonton Oilers	OT	Salo	16,282	4–4–3–2	13	L
14	November 7	Edmonton Oilers	1 – 3	Mighty Ducks of Anaheim		Ranford	13,555	4–5–3–2	13	L
15	November 9	Edmonton Oilers	1 – 1	Los Angeles Kings	OT	Salo	13,282	4–5–4–2	14	T
16	November 10	Edmonton Oilers	4 – 5	Phoenix Coyotes	OT	Salo	13,796	4–5–4–3	15	OTL
17	November 12	Edmonton Oilers	2 – 2	St. Louis Blues	OT	Salo	15,671	4–5–5–3	16	T
18	November 14	Edmonton Oilers	6 – 3	Chicago Blackhawks		Salo	14,424	5–5–5–3	18	W
19	November 20	Detroit Red Wings	1 – 2	Edmonton Oilers		Salo	17,100	6–5–5–3	20	W
20	November 21	New York Islanders	4 – 4	Edmonton Oilers	OT	Ranford	14,077	6–5–6–3	21	T
21	November 24	Chicago Blackhawks	3 – 2	Edmonton Oilers		Salo	13,351	6–6–6–3	21	L
22	November 26	Edmonton Oilers	2 – 4	Detroit Red Wings		Salo	19,983	6–7–6–3	21	L
23	November 27	Edmonton Oilers	2 – 5	Toronto Maple Leafs		Salo	19,337	6–8–6–3	21	L

December: 6–4–3–2 (home: 4–0–2–0; road: 2–4–1–2)

Game	Date	Visitor	Score	Home	OT	Decision	Attendance	Record	Pts	Recap
24	December 1	Colorado Avalanche	1 – 3	Edmonton Oilers		Salo	16,009	7–8–6–3	23	W
25	December 2	Edmonton Oilers	2 – 3	Vancouver Canucks	OT	Salo	13,038	7–8–6–4	24	OTL
26	December 4	Vancouver Canucks	2 – 3	Edmonton Oilers		Salo	17,100	8–8–6–4	26	W
27	December 6	Edmonton Oilers	1 – 5	Chicago Blackhawks		Salo	13,688	8–9–6–4	26	L
28	December 8	Edmonton Oilers	1 – 2	New York Rangers	OT	Salo	18,200	8–9–6–5	27	OTL
29	December 9	Edmonton Oilers	2 – 2	Boston Bruins	OT	Ranford	14,806	8–9–7–5	28	T
30	December 11	Edmonton Oilers	3 – 1	New Jersey Devils		Ranford	14,224	9–9–7–5	30	W
31	December 14	Edmonton Oilers	4 – 2	New York Islanders		Salo	6,526	10–9–7–5	32	W
32	December 15	Edmonton Oilers	1 – 5	Detroit Red Wings		Ranford	19,983	10–10–7–5	32	L
33	December 17	Dallas Stars	2 – 2	Edmonton Oilers	OT	Salo	17,100	10–10–8–5	33	T
34	December 19	Ottawa Senators	3 – 3	Edmonton Oilers	OT	Salo	16,217	10–10–9–5	34	T
35	December 21	Washington Capitals	2 – 6	Edmonton Oilers		Ranford	14,288	11–10–9–5	36	W
36	December 23	Edmonton Oilers	1 – 2	Calgary Flames		Salo	16,807	11–11–9–5	36	L
37	December 27	Mighty Ducks of Anaheim	1 – 4	Edmonton Oilers		Salo	17,100	12–11–9–5	38	W
38	December 30	Edmonton Oilers	2 – 8	Los Angeles Kings		Ranford	18,118	12–12–9–5	38	L

January: 5–3–4–2 (home: 2–1–3–2; road: 3–2–1–0)

Game	Date	Visitor	Score	Home	OT	Decision	Attendance	Record	Pts	Recap
39	January 1	Edmonton Oilers	5 – 4	Phoenix Coyotes		Salo	15,154	13–12–9–5	40	W
40	January 3	Edmonton Oilers	2 – 2	Colorado Avalanche	OT	Salo	18,007	13–12–10–5	41	T
41	January 5	San Jose Sharks	1 – 1	Edmonton Oilers	OT	Salo	14,217	13–12–11–5	42	T
42	January 7	Tampa Bay Lightning	1 – 5	Edmonton Oilers		Salo	14,212	14–12–11–5	44	W
43	January 11	Dallas Stars	3 – 2	Edmonton Oilers		Salo	17,100	14–13–11–5	44	L
44	January 14	Toronto Maple Leafs	3 – 2	Edmonton Oilers	OT	Salo	17,100	14–13–11–6	45	OTL
45	January 16	Detroit Red Wings	3 – 3	Edmonton Oilers	OT	Salo	17,100	14–13–12–6	46	T
46	January 19	Calgary Flames	0 – 7	Edmonton Oilers		Salo	15,691	15–13–12–6	48	W
47	January 22	Vancouver Canucks	3 – 3	Edmonton Oilers	OT	Salo	17,100	15–13–13–6	49	T
48	January 24	Nashville Predators	3 – 2	Edmonton Oilers	OT	Salo	13,427	15–13–13–7	50	OTL
49	January 25	Edmonton Oilers	5 – 4	Vancouver Canucks	OT	Salo	13,133	16–13–13–7	52	W
50	January 28	Edmonton Oilers	7 – 3	Tampa Bay Lightning		Ranford	12,395	17–13–13–7	54	W
51	January 29	Edmonton Oilers	1 – 2	Florida Panthers		Salo	16,181	17–14–13–7	54	L
52	January 31	Edmonton Oilers	1 – 2	Dallas Stars		Salo	17,001	17–15–13–7	54	L

February: 8–2–2–1 (home: 4–0–0–1; road: 4–2–2–0)

Game	Date	Visitor	Score	Home	OT	Decision	Attendance	Record	Pts	Recap
53	February 2	Chicago Blackhawks	1 – 4	Edmonton Oilers		Salo	13,472	18–15–13–7	56	W
54	February 8	Edmonton Oilers	5 – 4	Dallas Stars	OT	Salo	19,668	19–15–13–7	58	W
55	February 10	Edmonton Oilers	3 – 2	Philadelphia Flyers		Salo	19,730	20–15–13–7	60	W
56	February 11	Edmonton Oilers	2 – 2	Pittsburgh Penguins	OT	Salo	16,732	20–15–14–7	61	T
57	February 13	Edmonton Oilers	2 – 2	Buffalo Sabres	OT	Salo	18,690	20–15–15–7	62	T
58	February 15	Edmonton Oilers	2 – 1	Nashville Predators		Salo	16,034	21–15–15–7	64	W
59	February 18	Edmonton Oilers	2 – 4	Calgary Flames		Salo	17,145	21–16–15–7	64	L
60	February 19	Calgary Flames	3 – 2	Edmonton Oilers	OT	Salo	17,100	21–16–15–8	65	OTL
61	February 21	Los Angeles Kings	3 – 6	Edmonton Oilers		Salo	14,615	22–16–15–8	67	W
62	February 23	Boston Bruins	2 – 4	Edmonton Oilers		Ranford	15,108	23–16–15–8	69	W
63	February 25	Atlanta Thrashers	4 – 5	Edmonton Oilers		Salo	17,100	24–16–15–8	71	W
64	February 27	Edmonton Oilers	2 – 3	Mighty Ducks of Anaheim		Salo	17,174	24–17–15–8	71	L
65	February 29	Edmonton Oilers	3 – 1	Colorado Avalanche		Salo	18,007	25–17–15–8	73	W

March: 4–7–1–0 (home: 2–5–0–0; road: 2–2–1–0)

Game	Date	Visitor	Score	Home	OT	Decision	Attendance	Record	Pts	Recap
66	March 4	Pittsburgh Penguins	3 – 2	Edmonton Oilers		Salo	17,000	25–18–15–8	73	L
67	March 7	Toronto Maple Leafs	2 – 0	Edmonton Oilers		Salo	17,100	25–19–15–8	73	L
68	March 10	Colorado Avalanche	4 – 2	Edmonton Oilers		Salo	17,100	25–20–15–8	73	L
69	March 12	Edmonton Oilers	3 – 4	Nashville Predators		Ranford	17,113	25–21–15–8	73	L
70	March 13	Edmonton Oilers	3 – 0	Atlanta Thrashers		Salo	14,311	26–21–15–8	75	W
71	March 15	Edmonton Oilers	2 – 2	Carolina Hurricanes	OT	Salo	9,789	26–21–16–8	76	T
72	March 17	Ottawa Senators	2 – 4	Edmonton Oilers		Salo	17,100	27–21–16–8	78	W
73	March 19	Calgary Flames	3 – 2	Edmonton Oilers		Salo	17,100	27–22–16–8	78	L
74	March 22	Mighty Ducks of Anaheim	1 – 2	Edmonton Oilers		Salo	15,673	28–22–16–8	80	W
75	March 25	Vancouver Canucks	3 – 2	Edmonton Oilers		Salo	17,100	28–23–16–8	80	L
76	March 27	Edmonton Oilers	2 – 1	San Jose Sharks		Salo	17,483	29–23–16–8	82	W
77	March 29	Edmonton Oilers	2 – 3	Colorado Avalanche		Salo	18,007	29–24–16–8	82	L

April: 3–2–0–0 (home: 1–2–0–0; road: 2–0–0–0)

Game	Date	Visitor	Score	Home	OT	Decision	Attendance	Record	Pts	Recap
78	April 1	Phoenix Coyotes	3 – 4	Edmonton Oilers	OT	Salo	17,100	30–24–16–8	84	W
79	April 3	San Jose Sharks	1 – 0	Edmonton Oilers		Salo	16,283	30–25–16–8	84	L
80	April 5	Colorado Avalanche	3 – 2	Edmonton Oilers		Salo	17,100	30–26–16–8	84	L
81	April 7	Edmonton Oilers	5 – 4	Vancouver Canucks	OT	Salo	18,422	31–26–16–8	86	W
82	April 8	Edmonton Oilers	6 – 3	Calgary Flames		Minard	17,145	32–26–16–8	88	W

Legend: W Win (2 points) L Loss (0 points) T Tie (1 point) OTL Overtime loss (1 point)

=== Playoffs ===
2000 Stanley Cup playoffs
Western Conference Quarterfinals vs. (2) Dallas Stars – Stars win 4–1

Game	Date	Visitor	Score	Home	OT	Decision	Attendance	Series	Recap
1	April 12	Edmonton Oilers	1 – 2	Dallas Stars		Salo	17,001	0–1	L
2	April 13	Edmonton Oilers	0 – 3	Dallas Stars		Salo	17,001	0–2	L
3	April 16	Dallas Stars	2 – 5	Edmonton Oilers		Salo	17,100	1–2	W
4	April 18	Dallas Stars	4 – 3	Edmonton Oilers		Salo	17,100	1–3	L
5	April 21	Edmonton Oilers	2 – 3	Dallas Stars		Salo	17,001	1–4	L

Legend: W Win L Loss

== Player statistics ==
=== Scoring ===
- Position abbreviations: C = Centre; D = Defence; G = Goaltender; LW = Left wing; RW = Right wing
- † = Joined team via a transaction (e.g., trade, waivers, signing) during the season. Stats reflect time with the Oilers only.
- ‡ = Left team via a transaction (e.g., trade, waivers, release) during the season. Stats reflect time with the Oilers only.

No.	Player	Pos	Regular season						Playoffs					
No.	Player	Pos	GP	G	A	Pts	+/-	PIM	GP	G	A	Pts	+/-	PIM
39	Doug Weight	C	77	21	51	72	6	54	5	3	2	5	−3	4
94	Ryan Smyth	LW	82	28	26	54	−2	58	5	1	0	1	−2	6
29 (Note: Selivanov wore number 28 in his first four games.)	Alexander Selivanov	RW	67	27	20	47	2	46	5	0	0	0	0	8
9	Bill Guerin	RW	70	24	22	46	4	123	5	3	2	5	−1	9
22	Roman Hamrlik	D	80	8	37	45	1	68	5	0	1	1	−4	4
26	Todd Marchant	C	82	17	23	40	7	70	3	1	0	1	−1	2
5	Tom Poti	D	76	9	26	35	8	65	5	0	1	1	−3	0
44	Janne Niinimaa	D	81	8	25	33	14	89	5	0	2	2	1	2
25	Mike Grier	RW	65	9	22	31	9	68	—	—	—	—	—	—
18	Ethan Moreau	LW	73	17	10	27	8	62	5	0	1	1	0	0
19	Boyd Devereaux	C	76	8	19	27	7	20	—	—	—	—	—	—
34	Jim Dowd	C	69	5	18	23	10	45	5	2	1	3	−2	4
10	Pat Falloon‡	RW	33	5	13	18	6	4	—	—	—	—	—	—
20	Josef Beranek‡	C	58	9	8	17	−6	39	—	—	—	—	—	—
27	Georges Laraque	RW	76	8	8	16	5	123	5	0	1	1	−1	6
17	Rem Murray	C	44	9	5	14	−2	8	5	0	1	1	−1	2
21	Jason Smith	D	80	3	11	14	16	60	5	0	1	1	0	4
23	Sean Brown	D	72	4	8	12	1	192	3	0	0	0	−1	23
37	Daniel Cleary	LW	17	3	2	5	−1	8	4	0	1	1	1	2
15	Chad Kilger	C	40	3	2	5	−6	18	3	0	0	0	0	0
24	Christian Laflamme‡	D	50	0	5	5	−4	32	—	—	—	—	—	—
14	Bert Robertsson	D	52	0	4	4	−3	34	5	0	0	0	−1	0
13	German Titov†	LW	7	0	4	4	2	4	5	1	1	2	−2	0
47	Paul Comrie	C	15	1	2	3	−2	4	—	—	—	—	—	—
55 (Note: Ulanov wore number 2 in his first three games.)	Igor Ulanov†	D	14	0	3	3	−3	10	5	0	0	0	−1	6
2	Brett Hauer	D	5	0	2	2	−2	2	—	—	—	—	—	—
35	Tommy Salo	G	70	0	1	1		8	5	0	0	0		2
10	Kevin Brown†	RW	7	0	0	0	0	0	1	0	0	0	0	0
33	Dan LaCouture	LW	5	0	0	0	0	10	1	0	0	0	0	0
1	Mike Minard	G	1	0	0	0		0	—	—	—	—	—	—
12	Michel Picard†	LW	2	0	0	0	0	2	—	—	—	—	—	—
30	Bill Ranford	G	16	0	0	0		2	—	—	—	—	—	—

=== Goaltending ===
No.	Player	Regular season										Playoffs								
No.	Player	GP	W	L	T	SA	GA	GAA	SV%	SO	TOI	GP	W	L	SA	GA	GAA	SV%	SO	TOI
35	Tommy Salo	70	27	28	13	1875	162	2.33	.914	2	4164	5	1	4	133	14	2.83	.895	0	297
30	Bill Ranford	16	4	6	3	407	47	3.59	.885	0	785	—	—	—	—	—	—	—	—	—
1	Mike Minard	1	1	0	0	36	3	3.00	.917	0	60	—	—	—	—	—	—	—	—	—

== Awards and records ==
=== Awards ===
Type	Award/honour	Recipient	Ref
League (in-season)	NHL All-Star Game selection	Tommy Salo	
Team	Community Service Award	Todd Marchant	
Team	Defenceman of the Year	Jason Smith	
Team	Molson Cup	Tommy Salo	
Team	Most Popular Player	Georges Laraque	
Team	Top Defensive Forward	Mike Grier	
Team	Top First Year Oiler	Jim Dowd	
Team	Unsung Hero	Ethan Moreau	
Team	Zane Feldman Trophy	Tommy Salo	

=== Milestones ===
Regular Season
Player	Milestone	Reached
Josef Beranek	300th NHL PIM	October 1, 1999
Paul Comrie	1st NHL Game	October 1, 1999
Boyd Devereaux	100th NHL Game	October 1, 1999
Paul Comrie	1st NHL Assist; 1st NHL Point	October 6, 1999
Roman Hamrlik	500th NHL Game	October 20, 1999
Paul Comrie	1st NHL Goal	October 23, 1999
Josef Beranek	400th NHL Game	October 31, 1999
Ethan Moreau	300th NHL PIM	October 31, 1999
Alexander Selivanov	300th NHL PIM	October 31, 1999
Roman Hamrlik	600th NHL PIM	November 12, 1999
Alexander Selivanov	100th NHL Goal; 2nd NHL Hat-trick; 1st Four-Goal NHL Game	November 14, 1999
Doug Weight	500th NHL Point	November 14, 1999
Josef Beranek	100th NHL Goal	November 27, 1999
Bill Guerin	700th NHL PIM	November 27, 1999
Todd Marchant	100th NHL Assist	November 27, 1999
Sean Brown	100th NHL Game	December 1, 1999
Todd Marchant	300th NHL PIM	December 6, 1999
Tom Poti	100th NHL Game	December 11, 1999
Mike Grier	100th NHL Point	December 14, 1999
Ryan Smyth	300th NHL Game	December 14, 1999
Todd Marchant	400th NHL Game	December 17, 1999
Chad Kilger	100th NHL PIM	December 21, 1999
Pat Falloon	300th NHL Point	December 27, 1999
Sean Brown	300th NHL PIM	December 30, 1999
Mike Grier	200th NHL PIM	December 30, 1999
Alexander Selivanov	200th NHL Point	January 1, 2000
Sean Brown	1st NHL Gordie Howe hat trick	January 19, 2000
Roman Hamrlik	200th NHL Assist	January 25, 2000
Georges Laraque	100th NHL Game	February 8, 2000
Bill Guerin	2nd NHL Gordie Howe hat trick	February 10, 2000
Bert Robertsson	100th NHL Game	February 11, 2000
Doug Weight	600th NHL Game	February 15, 2000
Bill Guerin	3rd NHL Gordie Howe hat trick	February 18, 2000
Georges Laraque	200th NHL PIM; 1st NHL Hat-trick	February 21, 2000
Todd Marchant	200th NHL Point	February 23, 2000
Jason Smith	400th NHL Game	February 23, 2000
Sean Brown	400th NHL PIM	February 25, 2000
Janne Niinimaa	300th NHL Game	March 4, 2000
Jim Dowd	200th NHL Game	March 10, 2000
Ryan Smyth	2nd NHL Hat-trick; 1st NHL Natural Hat-trick	March 13, 2000
Doug Weight	500th NHL PIM	March 13, 2000
Boyd Devereaux	1st NHL Hat-trick	March 17, 2000
Ryan Smyth	100th NHL Goal	March 19, 2000
Bill Guerin	800th NHL PIM	March 27, 2000
Igor Ulanov	100th NHL Point	March 29, 2000
Tom Poti	100th NHL PIM	April 1, 2000
Alexander Selivanov	100th NHL Assist	April 1, 2000
Doug Weight	400th NHL Assist	April 1, 2000
Mike Minard	1st NHL Game; 1st NHL Win	April 8, 2000
Rem Murray	100th NHL Point	April 8, 2000
Alexander Selivanov	400th NHL Game; 3rd NHL Hat-trick	April 8, 2000

Playoffs
Player	Milestone	Reached
Daniel Cleary	1st NHL Game	April 12, 2000
Dan LaCouture	1st NHL Game	April 12, 2000
Bert Robertsson	1st NHL Game	April 12, 2000
Kevin Brown	1st NHL Game	April 13, 2000
Daniel Cleary	1st NHL Assist; 1st NHL Point	April 16, 2000
Tommy Salo	1st NHL Win	April 16, 2000
Doug Weight	1st NHL Hat-trick	April 16, 2000
Bill Guerin	1st NHL Hat-trick	April 18, 2000
Georges Laraque	1st NHL Assist; 1st NHL Point	April 21, 2000

== Transactions ==
=== Trades ===
June 26, 1999	To Nashville Predators Craig Millar	To Edmonton Oilers 3rd round pick in 1999
November 30, 1999	To Phoenix Coyotes Éric Houde	To Edmonton Oilers Rob Murray
December 29, 1999	To Boston Bruins Mike Matteucci	To Edmonton Oilers Kay Whitmore
February 4, 2000	To Washington Capitals 4th round pick in 2001	To Edmonton Oilers Alexandre Volchkov
March 9, 2000	To Montreal Canadiens Christian Laflamme; Matthieu Descoteaux	To Edmonton Oilers Igor Ulanov; Alain Nasreddine
March 14, 2000	To Pittsburgh Penguins Josef Beranek	To Edmonton Oilers German Titov

=== Players acquired ===
Date	Player	Former team	Contract terms
August 4, 1999	Bill Ranford	Detroit Red Wings	1 year, $455,000
August 11, 1999	Éric Houde	Montreal Canadiens	2 years
August 19, 1999	Bert Robertsson	Vancouver Canucks	1 year
August 19, 1999	Brian Swanson	New York Rangers	2 years, $1.05 million
December 2, 1999	Michel Picard	St. Louis Blues	1 year
March 7, 2000	Kevin Brown	New York Rangers	1 year

=== Players lost ===
Date	Player	New team
June 20, 1999	Marko Tuomainen	Los Angeles Kings
July 8, 1999	Steve Passmore	Chicago Blackhawks
July 19, 1999	Bill Huard	Los Angeles Kings
July 22, 1999	Jeff Daw	Chicago Blackhawks
July 22, 1999	Chris Ferraro	New York Islanders
July 23, 1999	Joe Hulbig	Boston Bruins
August 11, 1999	Daniel Lacroix	New York Islanders
August 26, 1999	Jason Bowen	Colorado Avalanche
September 5, 1999	Bob Essensa	Phoenix Coyotes
September 29, 1999	Ian Herbers	Tampa Bay Lightning
December 9, 1999	Marty McSorley	Boston Bruins

=== Waivers ===
Date	Player	Team
September 27, 1999	Ladislav Benýšek	to Mighty Ducks of Anaheim
September 30, 1999	Todd Reirden	to St. Louis Blues
February 4, 2000	Pat Falloon	to Pittsburgh Penguins

== Draft picks ==
Edmonton's draft picks at the 1999 NHL entry draft.

Round	#	Player	Nationality	College/junior/club team (league)
1	13	Jani Rita	Finland	Jokerit (Finland)
2	36	Alexei Semenov	Russia	Sudbury Wolves (OHL)
2	41	Tony Salmelainen	Finland	HIFK (Finland)
3	81	Adam Hauser	United States	University of Minnesota (WCHA)
3	91	Mike Comrie	Canada	University of Michigan (CCHA)
5	139	Jonathan Fauteux	Canada	Val-d'Or Foreurs (QMJHL)
6	171	Chris Legg	Canada	London Nationals (Ont. Jr. B)
7	199	Christian Chartier	Canada	Saskatoon Blades (WHL)
9	256	Tamas Groschl	Hungary	Leksands IF (Sweden)
