= Terran Sandwith =

Canadian ice hockey player

- Born: April 17, 1972 (age 54) Edmonton, Alberta, Canada
- Height: 6 ft 4 in (193 cm)
- Weight: 210 lb (95 kg; 15 st 0 lb)
- Position: Defence
- Shot: Left
- Played for: Edmonton Oilers
- National team: Canada
- NHL draft: 42nd overall, 1990; Philadelphia Flyers
- Playing career: 1992–2003

Terran Sandwith (born April 17, 1972) is a Canadian former professional ice hockey defenceman who played eight games in the National Hockey League (NHL) for the Edmonton Oilers during the 1997–98 season.

== Bio ==
Sandwith was born in Edmonton, Alberta. He started his junior career with the Tri-City Americans in the WHL, steadily improving his point totals in three seasons with the team. For the 1991–92 season, Sandwith split time with the Brandon Wheat Kings and the Saskatoon Blades. He totalled 27 points to go along with 198 penalty minutes. He was selected in the second round of the 1990 NHL entry draft, 42nd overall, by the Philadelphia Flyers.

Having never played a game with Philadelphia, Sandwith signed with the Edmonton Oilers as a free agent in April 1996. He made his NHL debut during the 1997-98 season with Edmonton. He later played in the minor leagues for the Anaheim Ducks and Toronto Maple Leafs organizations.

In 1995, Sandwith played with RHI's Los Angeles Blades, totalling 11 points in 11 games.

Sandwith is president and CEO of GS Construction in Acheson, Alberta.

== Career statistics ==
			Regular season					Playoffs
Season	Team	League	GP	G	A	Pts	PIM	GP	G	A	Pts	PIM
1987–88	Hobbema Hawks	AJHL	58	5	13	18	106	—	—	—	—	—
1988–89	Tri-City Americans	WHL	31	0	0	0	29	6	0	0	0	4
1989–90	Tri-City Americans	WHL	70	4	14	18	92	7	0	2	2	14
1990–91	Tri-City Americans	WHL	46	5	17	22	132	7	1	0	1	14
1991–92	Brandon Wheat Kings	WHL	41	6	14	20	115	—	—	—	—	—
1991–92	Saskatoon Blades	WHL	18	2	5	7	53	18	2	1	3	28
1992–93	Hershey Bears	AHL	61	1	12	13	140	—	—	—	—	—
1993–94	Hershey Bears	AHL	62	3	5	8	169	2	0	1	1	4
1994–95	Hershey Bears	AHL	11	1	1	2	32	—	—	—	—	—
1994–95	Kansas City Blades	IHL	25	0	3	3	73	—	—	—	—	—
1995–96	Cape Breton Oilers	AHL	5	0	2	2	4	—	—	—	—	—
1996–97	Hamilton Bulldogs	AHL	78	3	6	9	213	22	0	2	2	27
1997–98	Edmonton Oilers	NHL	8	0	0	0	6	—	—	—	—	—
1997–98	Hamilton Bulldogs	AHL	54	4	8	12	131	9	0	0	0	10
1998–99	Cincinnati Mighty Ducks	AHL	40	0	6	6	77	—	—	—	—	—
1999–00	St. John's Maple Leafs	AHL	78	1	10	11	155	—	—	—	—	—
2000–01	Hamilton Bulldogs	AHL	59	1	12	13	154	—	—	—	—	—
2000–01	Houston Aeros	IHL	14	0	0	0	17	5	0	0	0	6
2001–02	Belfast Giants	BISL	48	0	13	13	92	6	0	0	0	2
2002–03	Jokerit	Liiga	31	0	1	1	69	—	—	—	—	—
2002–03	EHC Linz	Austria	16	2	7	9	26	—	—	—	—	—
NHL totals			8	0	0	0	6	—	—	—	—	—
AHL totals			448	14	62	76	1,075	33	0	3	3	41
