= Kevin Brown (ice hockey) =

Canadian ice hockey player (born 1974)

- Born: 11 May 1974 (age 52) Birmingham, England
- Height: 6 ft 1 in (185 cm)
- Weight: 212 lb (96 kg; 15 st 2 lb)
- Position: Right wing
- Shot: Right
- Played for: Los Angeles Kings; Hartford Whalers; Carolina Hurricanes; Edmonton Oilers; Manchester Storm
- NHL draft: 87th overall, 1992; Los Angeles Kings
- Playing career: 1994–2003

Kevin J. Brown (born 11 May 1974) is a British former professional ice hockey player.

== Biography ==
Brown was born in Birmingham, England, and raised in Mississauga, Ontario. As a youth, he played in the 1988 Quebec International Pee-Wee Hockey Tournament with the Toronto Marlboros minor ice hockey team. In the 1992 Nhl Entry Draft he was chosen in the fourth round by the Los Angeles Kings at number 87

On March 20, 1996, he was traded by the Los Angeles Kings fo defenseman Jaroslav Modry and an eighth round draft pick from the Ottawa Senators.

On July 1, 1996, Ottawa traded Brown to Anaheim for Mike Maneluk.

On October 1, 1996, Anaheim traded Brown to Hartford for the rights to Espen Knutsen.

On August 14, 1998, Brown signed with Edmonton as a free agent.

On March 23, 1999, Edmonton traded Brown to New York for Vladimir Vorobiev.

On March 7, 2000, Brown returned to Edmonton as a free agent.

== Career statistics ==
			Regular season					Playoffs
Season	Team	League	GP	G	A	Pts	PIM	GP	G	A	Pts	PIM
1991–92	Belleville Bulls	OHL	66	24	24	48	52	5	1	4	5	8
1992–93	Belleville Bulls	OHL	6	2	5	7	4	—	—	—	—	—
1992–93	Detroit Junior Red Wings	OHL	56	48	86	134	76	15	10	18	28	18
1993–94	Detroit Junior Red Wings	OHL	57	54	81	135	85	17	14	26	40	28
1994–95	Los Angeles Kings	NHL	23	2	3	5	18	—	—	—	—	—
1994–95	Phoenix Roadrunners	IHL	48	19	31	50	64	—	—	—	—	—
1995–96	Los Angeles Kings	NHL	7	1	0	1	4	—	—	—	—	—
1995–96	Phoenix Roadrunners	IHL	45	10	16	26	39	—	—	—	—	—
1995–96	Prince Edward Island Senators	AHL	8	3	6	9	2	3	1	3	4	0
1996–97	Hartford Whalers	NHL	11	0	4	4	6	—	—	—	—	—
1996–97	Springfield Indians	AHL	48	32	16	48	45	17	11	6	17	24
1997–98	Carolina Hurricanes	NHL	4	0	0	0	0	—	—	—	—	—
1997–98	Beast of New Haven	AHL	67	28	44	72	65	3	0	2	2	0
1998–99	Edmonton Oilers	NHL	12	4	2	6	0	—	—	—	—	—
1998–99	Hamilton Bulldogs	AHL	32	9	14	23	47	—	—	—	—	—
1998–99	Hartford Wolf Pack	AHL	9	3	2	5	14	5	1	3	4	4
1999–00	Edmonton Oilers	NHL	7	0	0	0	0	1	0	0	0	0
1999–00	Hamilton Bulldogs	AHL	54	21	38	59	53	4	2	2	4	8
2000–01	Phoenix Mustangs	WCHL	13	7	7	14	32	—	—	—	—	—
2000–01	Manchester Storm	BISL	36	17	32	49	108	—	—	—	—	—
2000–01	Alaska Aces	WCHL	10	10	10	20	8	3	2	3	5	20
2001–02	Hamilton Bulldogs	AHL	70	28	36	64	154	10	2	9	11	6
2002–03	Augusta Lynx	ECHL	14	1	4	5	16	—	—	—	—	—
2002–03	Florida Everblades	ECHL	52	23	37	60	72	1	0	0	0	2
NHL totals			64	7	9	16	28	1	0	0	0	0
AHL totals			288	124	156	280	380	42	17	25	42	42

== Awards ==
- 1993 - OHL Second All-Star Team
- 1994 - OHL First All-Star Team
- 1994 - Canadian Major Junior Second All-Star Team

== Transactions ==
- 20 March 1996 - Los Angeles trades Brown to Ottawa for Jaroslav Modry and an eighth-round pick in the 1996 NHL entry draft
- 1 July 1996 - Ottawa trades Brown to Anaheim for Mike Maneluk
- 1 October 1996 - Anaheim trades Brown to Hartford for the rights to Espen Knutsen
- 14 August 1998 - Brown transferred to Carolina after Hartford franchise relocated
- 14 August 1998 - Brown signs with Edmonton as a free agent
- 23 March 1999 - Edmonton trades Brown to New York for Vladimir Vorobiev
- 7 March 2000 - Brown signs with Edmonton as a free agent
- 10 September 2000 - Brown signs with Manchester Storm as a free agent

== See also ==
- List of National Hockey League players born in the United Kingdom
