= Alexander Selivanov =

Russian ice hockey player (born 1971)

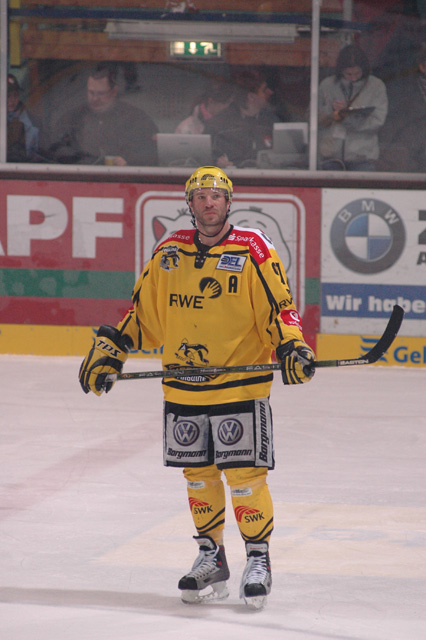
- Born: March 23, 1971 (age 55) Moscow, Russian SFSR, Soviet Union
- Height: 6 ft 0 in (183 cm)
- Weight: 208 lb (94 kg; 14 st 12 lb)
- Position: Right wing
- Shot: Left
- Played for: Spartak Moscow; Tampa Bay Lightning; Edmonton Oilers; Columbus Blue Jackets; Frankfurt Lions; Metallurg Magnitogorsk; SKA Saint Petersburg; Krefeld Pinguine; Fribourg-Gottéron; Füchse Duisburg; HYS The Hague
- NHL draft: 140th overall, 1994; Philadelphia Flyers
- Playing career: 1990–2012

Alexander Yurievich Selivanov (Russian: Александр Юръевич Селиванов); born March 23, 1971) is a Russian former professional ice hockey left winger who has played in the NHL and also in various European leagues. He quit playing after season 2011-2012. He is currently coaching Admiral Vladivostok of the KHL.

== Playing career ==
Selivanov was selected in the sixth round of the 1994 NHL entry draft, 140th overall, by the Philadelphia Flyers as an over-ager. He had previously played for the Russian club Spartak. Selivanov never played for Philadelphia, however, and made his NHL debut with the Tampa Bay Lightning, for whom he played parts of five seasons. He was later dealt to the Edmonton Oilers. During the 1999–2000 season, Selivanov briefly led the league in scoring, before injuries and a prolonged slump stopped him. He finished the season with 27 goals. After one more season, a disappointing one with the Columbus Blue Jackets, Selivanov returned to Europe, playing in Russia and Germany.

In January 2008 it was announced that he transferred from Germany to Switzerland to play with Fribourg-Gottéron in the National League A. In September 2009 HYS The Hague of the Dutch hockey league Eredivisie announced that Selivanov signed a one-year contract with them.

== Personal ==
Selivanov was married to the daughter of Hockey Hall of Famer Phil Esposito, Carrie. The couple had two sons together, Niko and Rocco, as well as a son from her previous marriage, Dylan. Carrie Esposito Selivanov died on January 30, 2012, from an abdominal aneurysm.

== Career statistics ==
=== Regular season and playoffs ===
			Regular season					Playoffs
Season	Team	League	GP	G	A	Pts	PIM	GP	G	A	Pts	PIM
1988–89	Spartak Moscow	URS	1	0	0	0	0	—	—	—	—	—
1988–89	MCOP Moscow	URS–3	6	0	0	0	0	—	—	—	—	—
1989–90	Spartak Moscow	URS	3	0	0	0	0	—	—	—	—	—
1989–90	Molot Perm	URS–2	2	0	0	0	0	—	—	—	—	—
1989–90	Traktor Lipetsk	URS–3	16	1	1	2	4	—	—	—	—	—
1990–91	Spartak Moscow	URS	21	3	1	4	6	—	—	—	—	—
1990–91	Buran Voronezh	URS–2	4	0	1	1	2	—	—	—	—	—
1991–92	Spartak Moscow	CIS	31	6	7	13	16	—	—	—	—	—
1992–93	Spartak Moscow	RUS	42	12	19	31	66	3	2	0	2	2
1993–94	Spartak Moscow	RUS	45	30	11	41	50	6	5	1	6	2
1994–95	Chicago Wolves	IHL	14	4	1	5	8	—	—	—	—	—
1994–95	Atlanta Knights	IHL	4	0	3	3	2	—	—	—	—	—
1994–95	Tampa Bay Lightning	NHL	43	10	6	16	14	—	—	—	—	—
1995–96	Tampa Bay Lightning	NHL	79	31	21	52	93	6	2	2	4	6
1996–97	Tampa Bay Lightning	NHL	69	15	18	33	61	—	—	—	—	—
1997–98	Tampa Bay Lightning	NHL	70	16	19	35	85	—	—	—	—	—
1998–99	Cleveland Lumberjacks	IHL	2	0	1	1	4	—	—	—	—	—
1998–99	Tampa Bay Lightning	NHL	43	6	13	19	18	—	—	—	—	—
1998–99	Edmonton Oilers	NHL	29	8	6	14	24	2	0	1	1	2
1999–00	Edmonton Oilers	NHL	67	27	20	47	46	5	0	0	0	8
2000–01	Columbus Blue Jackets	NHL	59	8	11	19	38	—	—	—	—	—
2001–02	Frankfurt Lions	DEL	58	26	35	61	87	—	—	—	—	—
2002–03	Metallurg Magnitogorsk	RSL	30	6	6	12	28	1	0	0	0	0
2002–03	Metallurg–2 Magnitogorsk	RUS–3	1	0	0	0	0	—	—	—	—	—
2003–04	SKA Saint Petersburg	RSL	21	1	6	7	10	—	—	—	—	—
2003–04	SKA–2 Saint Petersburg	RUS–3	2	2	3	5	0	—	—	—	—	—
2003–04	Krefeld Pinguine	DEL	30	14	11	25	14	—	—	—	—	—
2004–05	Krefeld Pinguine	DEL	50	18	24	42	101	—	—	—	—	—
2005–06	Krefeld Pinguine	DEL	51	30	29	59	101	5	0	1	1	6
2006–07	Krefeld Pinguine	DEL	52	15	25	40	62	2	0	0	0	4
2007–08	Krefeld Pinguine	DEL	32	10	11	21	24	—	—	—	—	—
2007–08	HC Fribourg–Gottéron	NLA	3	1	0	1	2	2	0	0	0	2
2008–09	Füchse Duisburg	DEL	47	18	22	40	48	—	—	—	—	—
2009–10	HYS The Hague	NED	25	16	33	49	63	5	2	2	4	6
2010–11	SC Bietigheim–Bissingen	GER–2	3	0	0	0	2	—	—	—	—	—
2010–11	Füchse Duisburg	GER–3	34	27	35	62	22	9	5	6	11	10
2011–12	HYS The Hague	NED	36	25	29	54	26	8	1	10	11	8
NHL totals			459	121	114	235	379	13	2	3	5	16
DEL totals			320	131	157	288	437	7	0	1	1	10

== Transactions ==
- 6 September 1994 – Philadelphia trades Selivanov to Tampa Bay for a fourth round pick (Flyers select Radovan Somik).
- 29 January 1999 – Tampa Bay trades Selivanov to Edmonton in exchange for Alexandre Daigle.
- 24 November 2000 – Signs as a free agent with the Columbus Blue Jackets.
