= Sean Brown (ice hockey) =

Canadian ice hockey player (born 1976)

- Born: November 5, 1976 (age 49) Oshawa, Ontario, Canada
- Height: 6 ft 3 in (191 cm)
- Weight: 216 lb (98 kg; 15 st 6 lb)
- Position: Defence
- Shot: Left
- Played for: Edmonton Oilers; Boston Bruins; New Jersey Devils; Vancouver Canucks; DEG Metro Stars; Nürnberg Ice Tigers; EC KAC
- NHL draft: 21st overall, 1995; Boston Bruins
- Playing career: 1996–2011

Sean P. R. Brown (born November 5, 1976) is a Canadian former professional ice hockey defenceman who played in the National Hockey League (NHL).

== Playing career ==
Brown was drafted late in the first round, 21st overall, in the 1995 NHL entry draft by the Boston Bruins following a successful career in the Ontario Hockey League as a defenceman with the Belleville Bulls and the Sarnia Sting. Less than a year later, he was dealt, along with Mariusz Czerkawski and a first-round draft choice to the Edmonton Oilers for Bill Ranford. Brown played parts of six seasons for the Oilers.

In March 2002, Brown was dealt back to Boston to provide defensive depth for a playoff run that never materialized. Going the other way in the trade was marginal defensive prospect Bobby Allen. After one more season with the Bruins, he was signed as an unrestricted free agent by the New Jersey Devils, and he has played for them and their American Hockey League affiliate, the Albany River Rats.

On March 9, 2006, Brown was dealt by the Devils to the Vancouver Canucks in exchange for a fourth-round draft pick. He featured in 12 games with the Canucks to conclude his NHL career.

He signed a contract with the Düsseldorf Metro Stars of the DEL on July 27, 2006. In summer 2007, the Nurnberg Ice Tigers, also of the DEL German League, signed Brown away from the Metro Stars. In March 2008, Brown was signed by EC KAC of the Austrian Hockey League.

== Career statistics ==
			Regular season					Playoffs
Season	Team	League	GP	G	A	Pts	PIM	GP	G	A	Pts	PIM
1992–93	Oshawa Legionaires	MetJHL	15	0	1	1	9	—	—	—	—	—
1993–94	Wellington Dukes	MetJHL	32	5	14	19	165	—	—	—	—	—
1993–94	Belleville Bulls	OHL	28	1	2	3	53	8	0	0	0	17
1994–95	Belleville Bulls	OHL	58	2	16	18	200	16	4	2	6	67
1995–96	Belleville Bulls	OHL	37	10	23	33	150	—	—	—	—	—
1995–96	Sarnia Sting	OHL	26	8	17	25	112	10	1	0	1	38
1996–97	Edmonton Oilers	NHL	5	0	0	0	4	—	—	—	—	—
1996–97	Hamilton Bulldogs	AHL	61	1	7	8	238	19	1	0	1	47
1997–98	Edmonton Oilers	NHL	18	0	1	1	43	—	—	—	—	—
1997–98	Hamilton Bulldogs	AHL	43	4	6	10	166	6	0	2	2	38
1998–99	Edmonton Oilers	NHL	51	0	7	7	188	1	0	0	0	10
1999–2000	Edmonton Oilers	NHL	72	4	8	12	192	3	0	0	0	23
2000–01	Edmonton Oilers	NHL	62	2	3	5	110	—	—	—	—	—
2001–02	Edmonton Oilers	NHL	61	6	4	10	127	—	—	—	—	—
2001–02	Boston Bruins	NHL	12	0	1	1	47	4	0	0	0	2
2002–03	Boston Bruins	NHL	69	1	5	6	117	—	—	—	—	—
2003–04	New Jersey Devils	NHL	39	0	3	3	44	1	0	0	0	2
2003–04	Albany River Rats	AHL	21	1	6	7	56	—	—	—	—	—
2005–06	New Jersey Devils	NHL	35	1	11	12	27	—	—	—	—	—
2005–06	Albany River Rats	AHL	1	0	1	1	2	—	—	—	—	—
2005–06	Vancouver Canucks	NHL	12	0	0	0	8	—	—	—	—	—
2006–07	DEG Metro Stars	DEL	28	2	6	8	100	3	0	0	0	64
2007–08	Nürnberg Ice Tigers	DEL	53	5	15	20	206	5	0	1	1	6
2008–09	EC KAC	EBEL	53	14	21	35	119	17	2	5	7	44
2009–10	EC KAC	EBEL	6	3	3	6	28	1	0	0	0	4
2010–11	EC KAC	EBEL	53	3	24	27	99	17	2	7	9	32
NHL totals			436	14	43	57	907	9	0	0	0	37

== Awards and honours ==
Award	Year
OHL
Second All-Star Team	1996

Sporting positions
Preceded by Kyle McLaren	Boston Bruins first-round draft pick 1995	Succeeded by Johnathan Aitken
