= Ethan Moreau =

Canadian ice hockey player (born 1975)

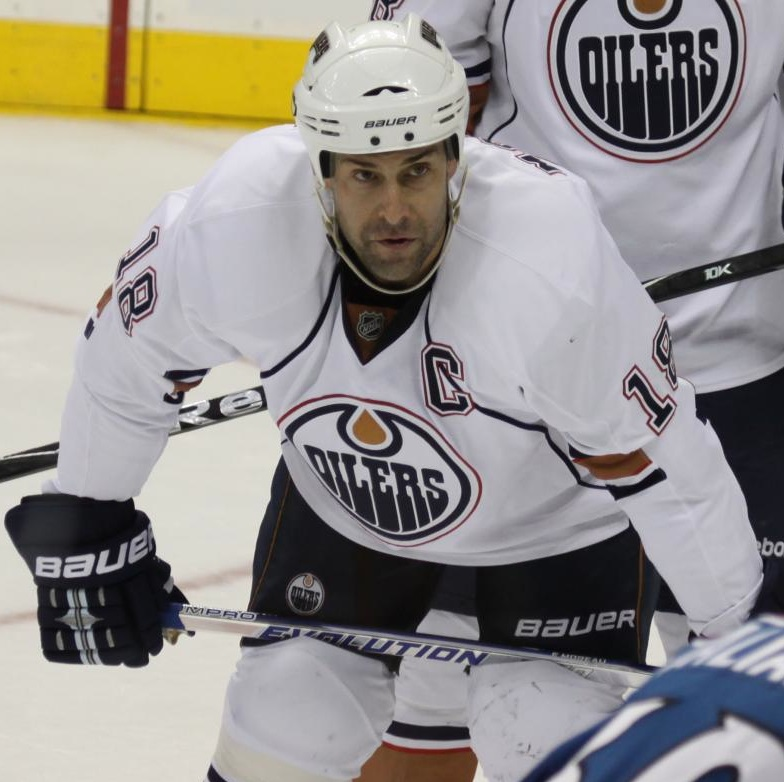
- Moreau with the Edmonton Oilers in 2010
- Born: September 22, 1975 (age 51) Huntsville, Ontario, Canada
- Height: 6 ft 2 in (188 cm)
- Weight: 220 lb (100 kg; 15 st 10 lb)
- Position: Left wing
- Shot: Left
- Played for: Chicago Blackhawks; Edmonton Oilers; Columbus Blue Jackets; Los Angeles Kings
- NHL draft: 14th overall, 1994; Chicago Blackhawks
- Playing career: 1995–2012

Ethan Byron Moreau (born September 22, 1975) is a Canadian former professional ice hockey player. Moreau was selected in the first round of the 1994 NHL entry draft, 14th overall, by the Chicago Blackhawks of the National Hockey League (NHL). He also played with the Edmonton Oilers, Columbus Blue Jackets, and the Los Angeles Kings of the NHL. He recently served as an assistant coach for Niagara University. Currently, Moreau is the owner of Ethan Moreau Hockey in Moose Jaw, Saskatchewan.

== Playing career ==
=== Minor ===
Moreau played his minor hockey with the Huntsville Blues of the OMHA, before playing Jr.B. hockey for the Orillia Terriers in the 1990—91 season.

=== Junior ===
Pre-OHL, Moreau played OHA-B junior hockey in Orillia, Ontario, for the Orillia Terriers, where he won the coveted Steve Philips Memorial Award for Most Improved Player (1990—91 season). When Moreau was selected by the Blackhawks, he had just completed his third year in the OHL, playing for Niagara Falls. In addition to good physical presence and skating, Moreau had shown a remarkable scoring touch in his draft year. The Blackhawks allowed Moreau to play another year in junior (for Sudbury), before bringing him to their IHL team in Indianapolis. Moreau also saw spot duty in the NHL, playing 8 games.

=== NHL ===
The following season (1996–97) was Moreau's first full year in the NHL, and he went on to play parts of four seasons with Chicago.

On March 20, 1999, Moreau was dealt in a blockbuster trade to the Edmonton Oilers along with Chad Kilger, Daniel Cleary and Christian Laflamme in exchange for Boris Mironov, Dean McAmmond and Jonas Elofsson.

In 2003-04, he scored a career-high 20 goals and was one of the team's best players in a failed late run for the playoffs. The following NHL season was cancelled due to the lockout, so Moreau played with EC VSV Villach of the Austrian Hockey League.

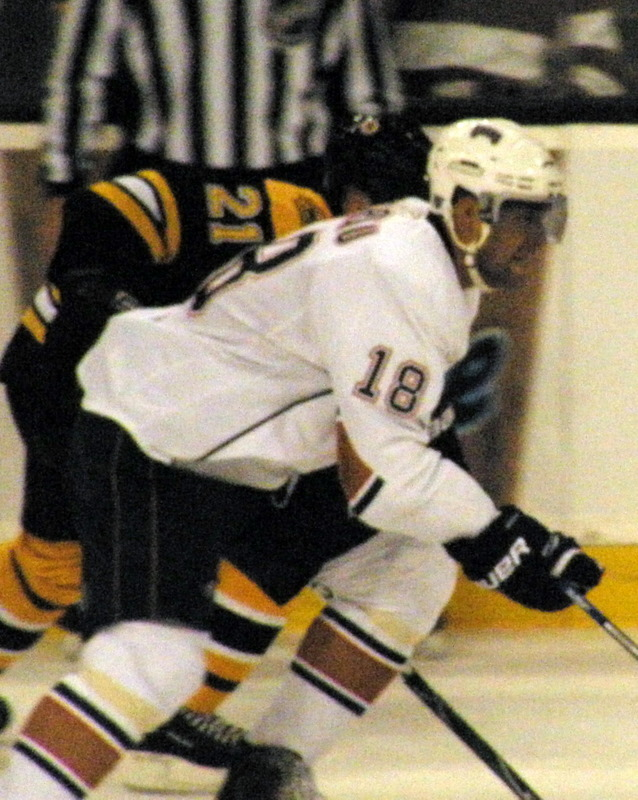
Ethan Moreau skates with the Edmonton Oilers during the 2009–10 season

Moreau was part of the Edmonton Oilers team that made a run to the Stanley Cup Finals in 2006, in which the Oilers lost in game 7 of the finals to the Carolina Hurricanes. Moreau had 2 goals and 1 assist in the playoffs.

On October 6, 2006, Moreau was signed by the Oilers to a 4-year contract extension, staving off the unrestricted free agency and keeping the winger with the team through the 2010–2011 season.

On October 2, 2007, Moreau was named captain of the Oilers, replacing the recently departed Jason Smith. However, he fractured his tibia a day later, (blocking a shot by Adrian Aucoin) during an exhibition game, which would result in missing 38 games. He returned during the mid-season, only to be injured again with a broken left leg, on February 25. Moreau had struggled with injuries during the 2006–07 and 2007–08 seasons and managed to play only 32 games, between these two seasons.

Moreau was also the last remaining asset that the Oilers retained, as a result of the Wayne Gretzky trade — taking all subsequent trades into account. He was also one of the longest-serving Oiler players in recent history, having been a member of the team from March 20, 1999, until June 30, 2010.

On January 18, 2009, Moreau scored his first career hat-trick in a 6-3 victory over the Phoenix Coyotes.

During a game against the Minnesota Wild, in Edmonton, on February 28, 2009, Moreau suffered an eye injury. Antti Miettinen of the Wild caught Moreau with a high stick, sending him sprawling to the ice. Doctors at the Royal Alexandra Hospital in Edmonton concluded that he suffered a scratched cornea and bleeding behind the eye.

On June 18, 2009, Ethan Moreau was awarded the King Clancy Memorial Trophy for best exemplifying leadership qualities on and off the ice and by also making significant humanitarian contributions to the Oilers Community Foundation.

On June 30, 2010, Moreau was claimed off waivers by the Columbus Blue Jackets. The Oilers were intending to buy out the final year of his contract had he gone unclaimed.

On August 20, 2011, he signed a one-year contract with the Los Angeles Kings for $600,000.

=== Retirement ===
On June 20, 2012, following the Kings' Stanley Cup Championship, Moreau joined the Montreal Canadiens' scouting staff as a professional scout for the Western Conference.

== Coaching ==
In 2016, he joined as the Niagara Purple Eagles men's ice hockey team as assistant coach of Dave Burkholder. As of 2026, he operates youth development camps; "Ethan Moreau Hockey (EMH)."

== Career statistics ==
=== Regular season and playoffs ===
			Regular season					Playoffs
Season	Team	League	GP	G	A	Pts	PIM	GP	G	A	Pts	PIM
1990–91	Orillia Terriers	COJHL	42	17	22	39	26	12	6	6	12	18
1991–92	Niagara Falls Thunder	OHL	62	30	25	55	39	17	4	6	10	4
1992–93	Niagara Falls Thunder	OHL	65	32	41	73	69	4	0	3	3	4
1993–94	Niagara Falls Thunder	OHL	59	44	54	98	100	—	—	—	—	—
1994–95	Niagara Falls Thunder	OHL	39	25	41	66	69	—	—	—	—	—
1994–95	Sudbury Wolves	OHL	23	13	17	30	22	18	6	12	18	26
1995–96	Chicago Blackhawks	NHL	8	0	1	1	4	—	—	—	—	—
1995–96	Indianapolis Ice	IHL	71	21	20	41	126	5	4	0	4	8
1996–97	Chicago Blackhawks	NHL	82	15	16	31	123	6	1	0	1	9
1997–98	Chicago Blackhawks	NHL	54	9	9	18	73	—	—	—	—	—
1998–99	Chicago Blackhawks	NHL	66	9	6	15	84	—	—	—	—	—
1998–99	Edmonton Oilers	NHL	14	1	5	6	8	4	0	3	3	6
1999–00	Edmonton Oilers	NHL	73	17	10	27	62	5	0	1	1	0
2000–01	Edmonton Oilers	NHL	68	9	10	19	90	4	0	0	0	2
2001–02	Edmonton Oilers	NHL	80	11	5	16	81	—	—	—	—	—
2002–03	Edmonton Oilers	NHL	78	14	17	31	112	6	0	1	1	16
2003–04	Edmonton Oilers	NHL	81	20	12	32	96	—	—	—	—	—
2004–05	EC VSV	AUT	16	10	6	16	73	3	4	0	4	0
2005–06	Edmonton Oilers	NHL	74	11	16	27	87	21	2	1	3	19
2006–07	Edmonton Oilers	NHL	7	1	0	1	12	—	—	—	—	—
2007–08	Edmonton Oilers	NHL	25	5	4	9	39	—	—	—	—	—
2008–09	Edmonton Oilers	NHL	77	14	12	26	133	—	—	—	—	—
2009–10	Edmonton Oilers	NHL	76	9	9	18	62	—	—	—	—	—
2010–11	Columbus Blue Jackets	NHL	37	1	5	6	24	—	—	—	—	—
2011–12	Los Angeles Kings	NHL	28	1	3	4	20	—	—	—	—	—
NHL totals			928	147	140	287	1110	46	3	6	9	52

Preceded by Eric Lecompte	Chicago Blackhawks first-round draft pick 1994	Succeeded by Dmitri Nabokov
Preceded by Jason Smith	Edmonton Oilers captain 2007–10	Succeeded by Shawn Horcoff
Preceded by Vincent Lecavalier	King Clancy Trophy winner 2009	Succeeded by Shane Doan
