= Jason Smith (ice hockey) =

Canadian ice hockey player (born 1973)

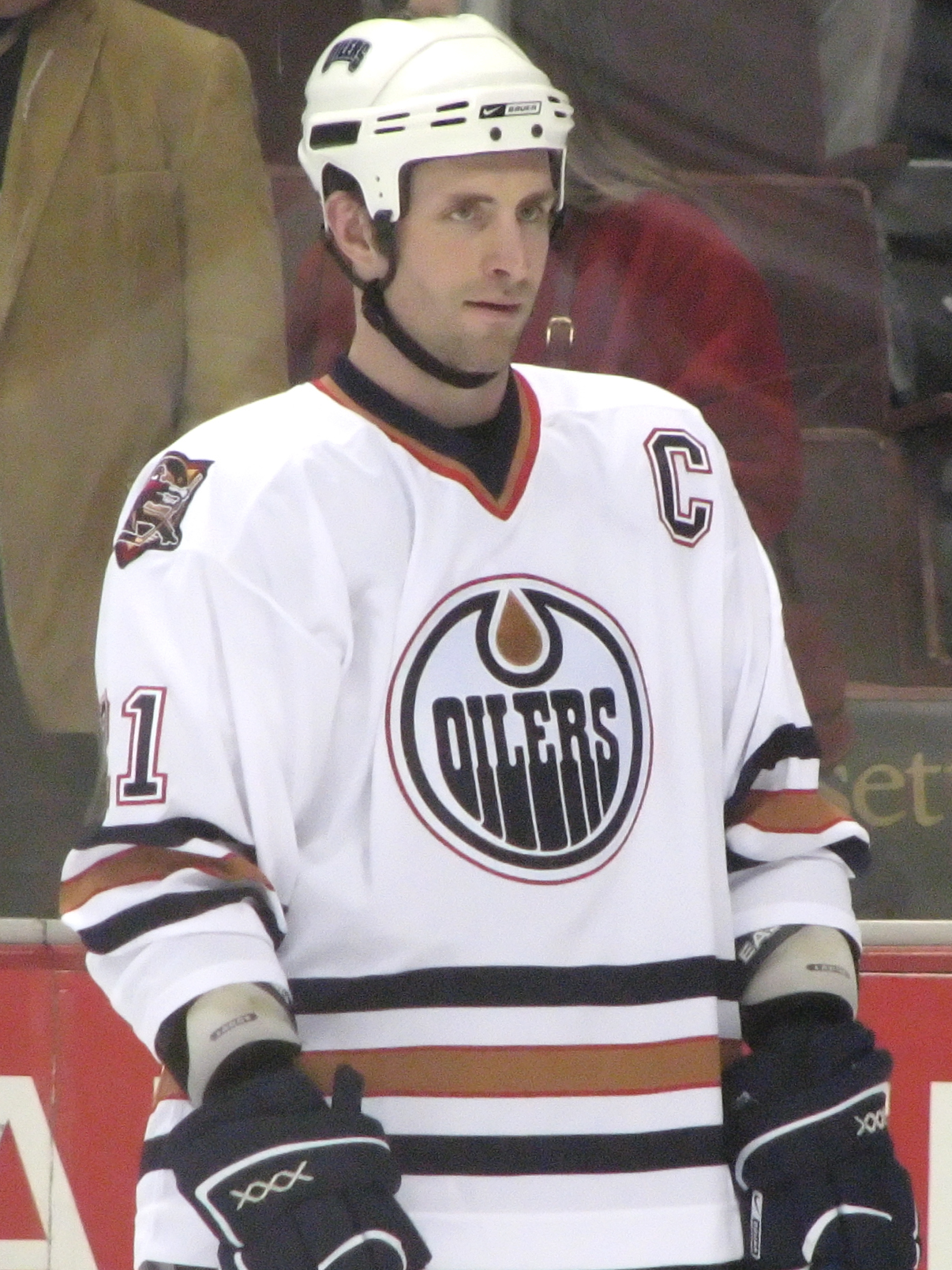
- Smith with the Edmonton Oilers in 2007
- Born: November 2, 1973 (age 52) Calgary, Alberta, Canada
- Height: 6 ft 3 in (191 cm)
- Weight: 215 lb (98 kg; 15 st 5 lb)
- Position: Defence
- Shot: Right
- Played for: New Jersey Devils; Toronto Maple Leafs; Edmonton Oilers; Philadelphia Flyers; Ottawa Senators
- National team: Canada
- NHL draft: 18th overall, 1992; New Jersey Devils
- Playing career: 1993–2009
Medal record
Representing Canada
World Junior Championships
Gold medal – first place	1993 Sweden

Jason Matthew Smith (born November 2, 1973) is a Canadian former professional ice hockey defenceman and current coach who played in over 1,000 regular season games in the National Hockey League (NHL) from 1993 to 2009. Smith played for the New Jersey Devils, Toronto Maple Leafs, Edmonton Oilers, Philadelphia Flyers and Ottawa Senators, having been originally selected by New Jersey in the first round, 18th overall, at the 1992 NHL entry draft. Smith served as team captain of both the Edmonton Oilers and Philadelphia Flyers, the former of which he led for five years and guided to the 2006 Stanley Cup Finals.

Smith was also the head coach for the Western Hockey League's Kelowna Rockets from 2016 to 2018, and is currently the head coach of the Edmonton Oil Kings.

== Playing career ==
=== Amateur ===
Smith was drafted in the first round, 18th overall, of the 1992 NHL entry draft by the New Jersey Devils. As a member of the Western Hockey League (WHL)'s Regina Pats, he was named to the WHL's All-Rookie Team for the 1991–92 season and the WHL First All-Star Team in 1992–93, also winning the Bill Hunter Trophy as the WHL's top defenceman in the latter season. Internationally, Smith was also a member of the gold medal-winning Canadian junior team at the World Junior Ice Hockey Championship in 1993 in Sweden, a roster also including future NHL stars Chris Pronger, Adrian Aucoin, Paul Kariya, Manny Legace and Martin Lapointe.

=== Professional ===
Smith made his NHL debut with the Devils during the 1993–94 season, though he spent the majority of the season in the American Hockey League (AHL) with the team's affiliate, the Albany River Rats. He then missed the majority of the 1994–95 season due to a knee injury, but recovered in time to play in one Stanley Cup playoff game, his playoff debut, before eventually returning to captain the River Rats to a Calder Cup championship in 1995, the same year the Devils captured their first Stanley Cup. Then next season, 1995–96, Smith became a regular fixture on New Jersey's NHL roster.

On February 25, 1997, during the 1996–97 season, Smith was involved in a blockbuster trade, moving to the Toronto Maple Leafs, along with Steve Sullivan and the rights to Alyn McCauley, in exchange for Doug Gilmour, Dave Ellett and New Jersey's fourth-round draft pick in 1999 (which Toronto had acquired in the Dave Andreychuk trade the year before.)

Smith spent parts of three seasons in Toronto before being traded to the Edmonton Oilers on March 3, 1999, during the 1998–99 season. When the Oilers' team captain Doug Weight was later traded to the St. Louis Blues, Smith's strong leadership tendencies resulted in his being handed the captaincy, where he would ultimately match Wayne Gretzky as the longest-serving captain in Oilers history at five seasons, wearing the "C" from 2001 to 2007, excluding the 2004–05 NHL lock-out in which the 2004–05 season was cancelled.

Smith captained the Oilers to a largely unexpected run to the 2006 Stanley Cup Finals, in which they faced the Carolina Hurricanes, another dark horse team. However, the Oilers lost in the Final game of a gruelling seven-game series. He contributed one goal and four assists during Edmonton's surprise playoff run.

On July 1, 2007, Edmonton General Manager Kevin Lowe traded Smith, along with forward Joffrey Lupul, to the Philadelphia Flyers in exchange for Joni Pitkänen, Geoff Sanderson and Philadelphia's third-round draft pick in 2009.

In his first and only season in Philadelphia, Smith captained a rebuilt Flyers squad to an Eastern Conference showdown against their inter-state rivals, the Pittsburgh Penguins. Despite the fact that the Penguins won the series, the Flyers' turnaround from the worst team in the NHL to their status in 2007–08 was a testament to Smith's leadership abilities.

In the 2008–09 season, Smith played his last year in the NHL with the Ottawa Senators before retiring from professional hockey on September 2, 2009. He later became an assistant coach for the Senators.

== Personal life ==
Smith's nickname throughout his playing career was "Gator", referring to his reptilian-looking hands and feet.

== Career statistics ==
=== Regular season and playoffs ===
			Regular season					Playoffs
Season	Team	League	GP	G	A	Pts	PIM	GP	G	A	Pts	PIM
1990–91	Calgary Canucks	AJHL	45	3	15	18	69	—	—	—	—	—
1990–91	Regina Pats	WHL	2	0	0	0	7	4	0	0	0	2
1991–92	Regina Pats	WHL	62	9	29	38	168	—	—	—
1992–93	Regina Pats	WHL	64	14	52	66	175	13	4	8	12	39
1992–93	Utica Devils	AHL	—	—	—	—	—	1	0	0	0	2
1993–94	Albany River Rats	AHL	20	6	3	9	31	—	—	—	—	—
1993–94	New Jersey Devils	NHL	41	0	5	5	43	6	0	0	0	7
1994–95	Albany River Rats	AHL	7	0	2	2	15	11	2	2	4	19
1994–95	New Jersey Devils	NHL	2	0	0	0	0	—	—	—	—	—
1995–96	New Jersey Devils	NHL	64	2	1	3	86	—	—	—	—	—
1996–97	New Jersey Devils	NHL	57	1	2	3	38	—	—	—	—	—
1996–97	Toronto Maple Leafs	NHL	21	0	5	5	16	—	—	—	—	—
1997–98	Toronto Maple Leafs	NHL	81	3	13	16	100	—	—	—	—	—
1998–99	Toronto Maple Leafs	NHL	60	2	11	13	40	—	—	—	—	—
1998–99	Edmonton Oilers	NHL	12	1	1	2	11	4	0	1	1	4
1999–2000	Edmonton Oilers	NHL	80	3	11	14	60	5	0	1	1	4
2000–01	Edmonton Oilers	NHL	82	5	15	20	120	6	0	2	2	6
2001–02	Edmonton Oilers	NHL	74	5	13	18	103	—	—	—	—	—
2002–03	Edmonton Oilers	NHL	68	4	8	12	64	6	0	0	0	19
2003–04	Edmonton Oilers	NHL	68	7	12	19	98	—	—	—	—	—
2005–06	Edmonton Oilers	NHL	76	4	13	17	84	24	1	4	5	16
2006–07	Edmonton Oilers	NHL	82	2	9	11	103	—	—	—	—	—
2007–08	Philadelphia Flyers	NHL	77	1	9	10	86	17	0	2	2	4
2008–09	Ottawa Senators	NHL	63	1	0	1	47	—	—	—	—	—
NHL totals			1,008	41	128	169	1,099	68	1	10	11	60

=== International ===
Year	Team	Event	Result	GP	G	A	Pts	PIM
1993	Canada	WJC	1st place, gold medalist(s)	7	1	3	4	10
2001	Canada	WC	5th	7	1	0	1	4
Junior totals				7	1	3	4	10
Senior totals				7	1	0	1	4

== Awards ==
- WHL East First All-Star Team – 1993

== Transactions ==
- February 25, 1997 – Traded by New Jersey, along with Steve Sullivan and the rights to Alyn McCauley, to Toronto in exchange for Dave Ellett, Doug Gilmour and a third-round draft pick;
- March 3, 1999 – Traded by Toronto to Edmonton in exchange for a fourth-round pick in the 1999 NHL entry draft and a second-round pick in the 2000 NHL entry draft;
- July 1, 2007 – Traded by Edmonton, along with Joffrey Lupul, to Philadelphia in exchange for Joni Pitkänen, Geoff Sanderson and a third-round pick in the 2009 NHL entry draft;
- July 8, 2008 – Signed as an unrestricted free agent by Ottawa;
- September 2, 2009 – Retired from the NHL.

== See also ==
- List of NHL players with 1,000 games played

Preceded by Brian Rolston	New Jersey Devils first-round draft pick 1992	Succeeded by Denis Pederson
Preceded by Doug Weight	Edmonton Oilers captain 2001–07	Succeeded by Ethan Moreau
Preceded by Peter Forsberg	Philadelphia Flyers captain 2007–08	Succeeded by Mike Richards
