= Vladimir Vorobiev =

Russian ice hockey player (born 1972)

- Born: November 2, 1972 (age 53) Cherepovets, Russian SFSR, Soviet Union
- Height: 6 ft 3 in (191 cm)
- Weight: 225 lb (102 kg; 16 st 1 lb)
- Position: Left wing
- Shot: Right
- Played for: Severstal Cherepovets; Dynamo Moscow; New York Rangers; Edmonton Oilers; Ak Bars Kazan; Salavat Yulaev Ufa
- National team: Russia
- NHL draft: 240th overall, 1992; New York Rangers
- Playing career: 1989–2011

Vladimir Anatolievich Vorobiev (Russian: Владимир Анатольевич Воробьёв, romanized: Vladimir Anatolyevich Vorobyev; born November 2, 1972) is a Russian former professional ice hockey player. He was selected in the tenth round of the 1992 NHL entry draft, 240th overall, by the New York Rangers, and played 33 games in the National Hockey League with the Rangers and Edmonton Oilers between 1997 and 1999. The vast majority of his career, which lasted from 1989 to 2011, was spent in the Russian Super League and its successor, the Kontinental Hockey League (KHL). Internationally Vorobiev played for the Russian national team at the 1995 and 1996 World Championships. After his retirement Vorobiev has worked in coaching roles in the KHL, and currently is an assistant coach with Avtomobilist Yekaterinburg.

== Playing career ==
Vorobiev did not come to North America until the 1996–97 NHL season, five years after he had been drafted. He split time between the New York Rangers, the Hartford Wolf Pack, and the Binghamton Rangers of the American Hockey League (AHL). He was traded to the Edmonton Oilers and spent two seasons in their system, (playing only two games at the NHL level, despite scoring a goal in both games) before returning to Russia.

== Career statistics ==
=== Regular season and playoffs ===
			Regular season					Playoffs
Season	Team	League	GP	G	A	Pts	PIM	GP	G	A	Pts	PIM
1989–90	Metallurg Cherepovets	USSR-2	19	1	1	2	2	—	—	—	—	—
1990–91	Metallurg Cherepovets	USSR-2	62	17	10	27	20	—	—	—	—	—
1991–92	Metallurg Cherepovets	USSR-2	57	16	7	25	34	—	—	—	—	—
1992–93	Metallurg Cherepovets	RUS	42	18	5	23	18	—	—	—	—	—
1992–93	Metallurg Cherepovets-2	RUS-2	1	0	0	0	0	—	—	—	—	—
1993–94	Dynamo Moscow	RUS	36	9	14	23	10	11	3	1	4	2
1994–95	Dynamo Moscow	RUS	48	9	20	29	28	14	1	7	8	2
1995–96	Dynamo Moscow	RUS	42	19	9	28	49	9	2	8	10	2
1996–97	New York Rangers	NHL	16	5	5	10	6	—	—	—	—	—
1996–97	Binghamton Rangers	AHL	61	22	27	49	6	4	1	1	2	2
1997–98	New York Rangers	NHL	15	2	2	4	6	—	—	—	—	—
1997–98	Hartford Wolf Pack	AHL	56	20	28	48	18	15	11	8	19	4
1998–99	Edmonton Oilers	NHL	2	2	0	2	2	1	0	0	0	0
1998–99	Hartford Wolf Pack	AHL	64	24	41	65	22	—	—	—	—	—
1998–99	Hamilton Bulldogs	AHL	8	3	6	9	2	6	0	1	1	2
1999–00	Hamilton Bulldogs	AHL	37	9	9	18	16	—	—	—	—	—
1999–00	Long Beach Ice Dogs	IHL	23	6	7	13	0	1	0	0	0	2
2000–01	Severstal Cherepovets	RSL	38	9	3	12	8	6	0	1	1	0
2002–03	Dynamo Moscow	RSL	47	8	9	17	20	5	1	3	4	2
2003–04	Dynamo Moscow	RSL	54	11	19	30	19	3	0	0	0	2
2003–04	Dynamo Moscow-2	RUS-3	1	0	0	0	2	—	—	—	—	—
2004–05	Dynamo Moscow	RSL	41	8	14	22	12	9	1	2	3	0
2005–06	Ak Bars Kazan	RSL	41	7	15	22	24	13	7	6	13	4
2006–07	Ak Bars Kazan	RSL	51	10	23	33	44	16	2	7	9	4
2007–08	Salavat Yulaev Ufa	RSL	41	9	19	28	26	—	—	—	—	—
2008–09	Salavat Yulaev Ufa	KHL	47	5	28	33	32	4	1	0	1	0
2009–10	Salavat Yulaev Ufa	KHL	21	0	6	6	0	2	0	0	0	0
2010–11	Severstal Cherepovets	KHL	33	2	4	6	16	2	0	0	0	6
RUS/RSL totals			481	117	150	267	269	86	17	35	52	18
KHL totals			101	7	38	45	48	8	1	0	1	6
NHL totals			33	9	7	16	14	1	0	0	0	0

=== International ===
Year	Team	Event	GP	G	A	Pts	PIM
1995	Russia	WC	6	0	2	2	6
1996	Russia	WC	8	0	2	2	2
Senior totals			14	0	4	4	6

== Awards and honors ==
- International Hockey League championship: 1995 (with Dynamo)
- AHL All-Star Game: 1998
- Russian Super League championship: 2005 (with Dynamo)
- IIHF European Champions Cup: 2006 (with Dynamo)
- Russian Super League championship: 2006 (with Ak Bars)
- IIHF European Champions Cup: 2007 (with Ak Bars)
