= 1998–99 Philadelphia Flyers season =

NHL hockey team season

1998–99 Philadelphia Flyers
- Division: 2nd Atlantic
- Conference: 5th Eastern
- 1998–99 record: 37–26–19
- Home record: 21–9–11
- Road record: 16–17–8
- Goals for: 231
- Goals against: 196

Team information
- General manager: Bob Clarke
- Coach: Roger Neilson
- Captain: Eric Lindros
- Alternate captains: Rod Brind'Amour; Eric Desjardins
- Arena: First Union Center
- Average attendance: 19,612
- Minor league affiliate: Philadelphia Phantoms

Team leaders
- Goals: John LeClair (43)
- Assists: Eric Lindros (53)
- Points: Eric Lindros (93)
- Penalty minutes: Eric Lindros (120)
- Plus/minus: John LeClair (+36)
- Wins: John Vanbiesbrouck (27)
- Goals against average: John Vanbiesbrouck (2.19)

The 1998–99 Philadelphia Flyers season was the franchise's 32nd season in the National Hockey League (NHL). The Flyers lost in the first round to the Toronto Maple Leafs in six games.

== Off-season ==
In the off-season, the Flyers went looking for a new goaltender. They opted not to re-sign Sean Burke, and Ron Hextall was about to enter his final season as a backup. They chose to sign former Florida Panther John Vanbiesbrouck over former Edmonton Oilers goalie Curtis Joseph, who ended up signing with the Toronto Maple Leafs.

== Regular season ==
Looking to put the previous year's disappointment behind them, the Flyers began the season 4–0–1. However, a quick 1–6–3 downturn caused the first casualties – as Trent Klatt was dealt to Vancouver and Shjon Podein was shipped to Colorado for Keith Jones. Jones scored a goal in his first game in orange and black, a 6–1 rout of New Jersey, keying a 6–1–0 run.

Turmoil continued, as, after a 5–4 overtime loss to the Devils on December 10 saw the Flyers blow a 4–1 lead, the decision was made to end the Chris Gratton experiment. He was dealt back to Tampa Bay along with Mike Sillinger for Mikael Renberg and Daymond Langkow, and the move paid immediate dividends. Philly topped Toronto, 3–0, spurring a 15-game unbeaten streak (10–0–5) during which the club matched a record by shutting out their opponents in four consecutive games (Islanders, Carolina, Nashville, Washington).

Another run, this time a 6–0–2 streak from January 18 to February 6, tied the Flyers atop the NHL standings with the Dallas Stars. That momentum did not last long, as the club went 1–4–1 after the All-Star break, including an inexplicable 4–3 loss in Los Angeles where the Kings scored three goals in the final minutes, including a 60-foot game-winner by Jozef Stumpel just before the final buzzer.

Following a win over Pittsburgh, the team suffered through a then franchise-worst 12 games without a victory (0–8–4), broken up only by a rally from two goals down to Detroit on March 21. Eric Lindros, who was having an MVP-type season with 40 goals and 53 assists in 71 games, was felled and lost for the season by a collapsed lung sustained during a 2–1 win against the expansion Nashville Predators on April 1. It is said that if roommate Keith Jones had not intervened at the last minute, Lindros might have died on the plane ride back to Philadelphia.

The Flyers managed to lock up the five-seed on the final day of the season with a win over Boston.

John LeClair continued his goal-scoring streak with 43 on the year, matching Tim Kerr's team record of four straight seasons with 40 or more goals. He was one of only a handful of players to make it through the entire season, as general manager Bob Clarke made 12 trades involving NHL players throughout the regular season, including re-acquiring former Flyer Mark Recchi from the Montreal Canadiens at the trade deadline.

=== Season standings ===
Atlantic Division
R	CR		GP	W	L	T	GF	GA	Pts
1	1	**New Jersey Devils**	82	47	24	11	248	196	105
2	5	**Philadelphia Flyers**	82	37	26	19	231	196	93
3	8	**Pittsburgh Penguins**	82	38	30	14	242	225	90
4	10	New York Rangers	82	33	38	11	217	227	77
5	13	New York Islanders	82	24	48	10	194	244	58

Eastern Conference
R		Div	GP	W	L	T	GF	GA	Pts
**1**	**y – New Jersey Devils**	**ATL**	**82**	**47**	**24**	**11**	**248**	**196**	**105**
**2**	**y – Ottawa Senators**	**NE**	**82**	**44**	**23**	**15**	**239**	**179**	**103**
**3**	**y – Carolina Hurricanes**	**SE**	**82**	**34**	**30**	**18**	**210**	**202**	**86**
**4**	**Toronto Maple Leafs**	**NE**	**82**	**45**	**30**	**7**	**268**	**231**	**97**
**5**	**Philadelphia Flyers**	**ATL**	**82**	**37**	**26**	**19**	**231**	**196**	**93**
**6**	**Boston Bruins**	**NE**	**82**	**39**	**30**	**13**	**214**	**181**	**91**
**7**	**Buffalo Sabres**	**NE**	**82**	**37**	**28**	**17**	**207**	**175**	**91**
**8**	**Pittsburgh Penguins**	**ATL**	**82**	**38**	**30**	**14**	**242**	**225**	**90**
9	Florida Panthers	SE	82	30	34	18	210	228	78
10	New York Rangers	ATL	82	33	38	11	217	227	77
11	Montreal Canadiens	NE	82	32	39	11	184	209	75
12	Washington Capitals	SE	82	31	45	6	200	218	68
13	New York Islanders	ATL	82	24	48	10	194	244	58
14	Tampa Bay Lightning	SE	82	19	54	9	179	292	47

Divisions: ATL – Atlantic Division, NE – Northeast Division, SE – Southeast Division

bold – Qualified for playoffs; y – Won division

== Playoffs ==
Although Vanbiesbrouck allowed nine goals to Curtis Joseph's eleven allowed, the Flyers lost their first round series with Toronto in six games. Flyers chairman Ed Snider and head coach Roger Neilson were fined $50,000 and $25,000, respectively, for criticizing the officiating in game six.

== Schedule and results ==
=== Preseason ===
1998 preseason
Preseason: 6–2–1 (home: 3–0–1; road: 3–1–0)

Game	Date	Score	Opponent	Record	Recap
1	September 19	6–3	@ Washington Capitals	1–0–0	W
2	September 22	2–2	Pittsburgh Penguins	1–0–1	T
3	September 23	7–1	@ Montreal Canadiens	2–0–1	W
4^{[a]}	September 26	0–1	Pittsburgh Penguins	2–1–1	L
5	September 29	5–1	Washington Capitals	3–1–1	W
6	October 1	4–2	@ Detroit Red Wings	4–1–1	W
7	October 2	1–2	@ New Jersey Devils	4–2–1	L
8	October 3	3–2	Detroit Red Wings	5–2–1	W
9	October 4	5–3	New Jersey Devils	6–2–1	W
Notes:^{a} Game played at Hersheypark Arena in Hershey, Pennsylvania.

Legend: W Win (2 points) L Loss (0 points) T Tie (1 point)

=== Regular season ===
1998–99 regular season
October: 5–3–2, 12 points (home: 3–1–1; road: 2–2–1)

Game	Date	Score	Opponent	Decision	Record	Points	Recap
1	October 9	1–0	@ New York Rangers	Vanbiesbrouck	1–0–0	2	W
2	October 11	4–1	Mighty Ducks of Anaheim	Vanbiesbrouck	2–0–0	4	W
3	October 16	5–2	@ Tampa Bay Lightning	Hextall	3–0–0	6	W
4	October 17	1–1 OT	@ Carolina Hurricanes	Vanbiesbrouck	3–0–1	7	T
5	October 20	3–1	San Jose Sharks	Vanbiesbrouck	4–0–1	9	W
6	October 22	2–3	New Jersey Devils	Vanbiesbrouck	4–1–1	9	L
7	October 24	2–2 OT	New York Rangers	Vanbiesbrouck	4–1–2	10	T
8	October 27	2–1	St. Louis Blues	Vanbiesbrouck	5–1–2	12	W
9	October 29	1–3	@ Ottawa Senators	Hextall	5–2–2	12	L
10	October 31	2–3	@ New York Islanders	Vanbiesbrouck	5–3–2	12	L

November: 6–4–2, 14 points (home: 3–2–1; road: 3–2–1)

Game	Date	Score	Opponent	Decision	Record	Points	Recap
11	November 1	4–5	Ottawa Senators	Hextall	5–4–2	12	L
12	November 3	4–4 OT	@ Pittsburgh Penguins	Vanbiesbrouck	5–4–3	13	T
13	November 7	2–2 OT	Buffalo Sabres	Vanbiesbrouck	5–4–4	14	T
14	November 9	1–5	@ Montreal Canadiens	Vanbiesbrouck	5–5–4	14	L
15	November 12	1–2	Florida Panthers	Vanbiesbrouck	5–6–4	14	L
16	November 14	6–1	New Jersey Devils	Hextall	6–6–4	16	W
17	November 17	4–1	@ Pittsburgh Penguins	Vanbiesbrouck	7–6–4	18	W
18	November 20	3–1	@ Carolina Hurricanes	Hextall	8–6–4	20	W
19	November 22	2–1 OT	@ Florida Panthers	Vanbiesbrouck	9–6–4	22	W
20	November 25	2–4	@ New York Islanders	Vanbiesbrouck	9–7–4	22	L
21	November 27	4–3	Toronto Maple Leafs	Vanbiesbrouck	10–7–4	24	W
22	November 29	6–2	Vancouver Canucks	Hextall	11–7–4	26	W

December: 7–2–5, 19 points (home: 2–1–3; road: 5–1–2)

Game	Date	Score	Opponent	Decision	Record	Points	Recap
23	December 4	0–3	@ Buffalo Sabres	Vanbiesbrouck	11–8–4	26	L
24	December 5	2–1	Washington Capitals	Hextall	12–8–4	28	W
25	December 8	5–5 OT	@ New Jersey Devils	Hextall	12–8–5	29	T
26	December 10	4–5 OT	New Jersey Devils	Hextall	12–9–5	29	L
27	December 12	3–0	@ Toronto Maple Leafs	Vanbiesbrouck	13–9–5	31	W
28	December 13	2–2 OT	Edmonton Oilers	Vanbiesbrouck	13–9–6	32	T
29	December 17	3–3 OT	Calgary Flames	Vanbiesbrouck	13–9–7	33	T
30	December 19	3–1	Chicago Blackhawks	Vanbiesbrouck	14–9–7	35	W
31	December 20	2–2 OT	Tampa Bay Lightning	Hextall	14–9–8	36	T
32	December 23	2–1	@ Boston Bruins	Vanbiesbrouck	15–9–8	38	W
33	December 26	3–2	@ Chicago Blackhawks	Vanbiesbrouck	16–9–8	40	W
34	December 28	1–1 OT	@ San Jose Sharks	Vanbiesbrouck	16–9–9	41	T
35	December 29	4–3 OT	@ Calgary Flames	Hextall	17–9–9	43	W
36	December 31	6–2	@ Vancouver Canucks	Vanbiesbrouck	18–9–9	45	W

January: 8–1–2, 18 points (home: 6–1–1; road: 2–0–1)

Game	Date	Score	Opponent	Decision	Record	Points	Recap
37	January 3	3–3 OT	@ Edmonton Oilers	Vanbiesbrouck	18–9–10	46	T
38	January 7	5–0	New York Islanders	Vanbiesbrouck	19–9–10	48	W
39	January 9	2–0	Carolina Hurricanes	Hextall	20–9–10	50	W
40	January 11	8–0	Nashville Predators	Vanbiesbrouck	21–9–10	52	W
41	January 13	3–0	@ Washington Capitals	Vanbiesbrouck	22–9–10	54	W
42	January 16	3–4	Toronto Maple Leafs	Vanbiesbrouck	22–10–10	56	L
43	January 18	5–0	@ Ottawa Senators	Vanbiesbrouck	23–10–10	56	W
44	January 21	4–1	Washington Capitals	Hextall	24–10–10	58	W
45	January 26	3–3 OT	Florida Panthers	Vanbiesbrouck	24–10–11	59	T
46	January 28	4–2	Phoenix Coyotes	Vanbiesbrouck	25–10–11	61	W
47	January 30	6–2	Tampa Bay Lightning	Hextall	26–10–11	63	W

February: 4–7–2, 10 points (home: 3–1–1; road: 1–6–1)

Game	Date	Score	Opponent	Decision	Record	Points	Recap
48	February 1	4–2	Los Angeles Kings	Vanbiesbrouck	27–10–11	65	W
49	February 4	5–2	Montreal Canadiens	Vanbiesbrouck	28–10–11	67	W
50	February 6	2–2 OT	Boston Bruins	Hextall	28–10–12	68	T
51	February 10	4–5	@ Mighty Ducks of Anaheim	Vanbiesbrouck	28–11–12	68	L
52	February 11	3–4	@ Los Angeles Kings	Hextall	28–12–12	68	L
53	February 14	4–4 OT	@ Colorado Avalanche	Vanbiesbrouck	28–12–13	69	T
54	February 16	4–1	@ Phoenix Coyotes	Vanbiesbrouck	29–12–13	71	W
55	February 18	1–3	Montreal Canadiens	Vanbiesbrouck	29–13–13	71	L
56	February 20	1–4	@ Ottawa Senators	Vanbiesbrouck	29–14–13	71	L
57	February 21	2–1	Pittsburgh Penguins	Hextall	30–14–13	73	W
58	February 24	3–5	@ Florida Panthers	Vanbiesbrouck	30–15–13	73	L
59	February 26	1–4	@ Tampa Bay Lightning	Hextall	30–16–13	73	L
60	February 28	5–6	@ New York Rangers	Vanbiesbrouck	30–17–13	73	L

March: 3–6–5, 11 points (home: 2–2–3; road: 1–4–2)

Game	Date	Score	Opponent	Decision	Record	Points	Recap
61	March 2	1–4	@ Montreal Canadiens	Vanbiesbrouck	30–18–13	73	L
62	March 4	0–5	Ottawa Senators	Pelletier	30–19–13	73	L
63	March 6	3–3 OT	New York Islanders	Vanbiesbrouck	30–19–14	74	T
64	March 7	1–1 OT	@ Buffalo Sabres	Vanbiesbrouck	30–19–15	75	T
65	March 9	2–2 OT	@ New York Islanders	Vanbiesbrouck	30–19–16	76	T
66	March 11	3–5	Colorado Avalanche	Vanbiesbrouck	30–20–16	76	L
67	March 13	0–4	@ Pittsburgh Penguins	Hextall	30–21–16	76	L
68	March 14	1–1 OT	Dallas Stars	Vanbiesbrouck	30–21–17	77	T
69	March 16	2–5	@ St. Louis Blues	Vanbiesbrouck	30–22–17	77	L
70	March 21	5–4	Detroit Red Wings	Vanbiesbrouck	31–22–17	79	W
71	March 22	3–1	@ Toronto Maple Leafs	Vanbiesbrouck	32–22–17	81	W
72	March 27	3–1	New York Rangers	Vanbiesbrouck	33–22–17	83	W
73	March 28	2–3 OT	@ Detroit Red Wings	Vanbiesbrouck	33–23–17	83	L
74	March 30	3–3 OT	Carolina Hurricanes	Hextall	33–23–18	84	T

April: 4–3–1, 9 points (home: 2–1–1; road: 2–2–0)

Game	Date	Score	Opponent	Decision	Record	Points	Recap
75	April 1	2–1	@ Nashville Predators	Vanbiesbrouck	34–23–18	86	W
76	April 3	0–3	@ Boston Bruins	Vanbiesbrouck	34–24–18	86	L
77	April 5	1–5	New York Rangers	Hextall	34–25–18	86	L
78	April 8	3–1	Pittsburgh Penguins	Vanbiesbrouck	35–25–18	88	W
79	April 10	2–1	@ Washington Capitals	Vanbiesbrouck	36–25–18	90	W
80	April 13	2–2 OT	Buffalo Sabres	Vanbiesbrouck	36–25–19	91	T
81	April 16	2–3 OT	@ New Jersey Devils	Vanbiesbrouck	36–26–19	91	L
82	April 18	3–1	Boston Bruins	Vanbiesbrouck	37–26–19	93	W

Legend: W Win (2 points) L Loss (0 points) T Tie (1 point)

=== Playoffs ===
1999 Stanley Cup playoffs
Eastern Conference quarterfinals vs. Toronto Maple Leafs – Maple Leafs win 4–2

Game	Date	Score	Opponent	Decision	Series	Recap
1	April 22	3–0	@ Toronto Maple Leafs	Vanbiesbrouck	Flyers lead 1–0	W
2	April 24	1–2	@ Toronto Maple Leafs	Vanbiesbrouck	Series tied 1–1	L
3	April 26	1–2	Toronto Maple Leafs	Vanbiesbrouck	Maple Leafs lead 2–1	L
4	April 28	5–2	Toronto Maple Leafs	Vanbiesbrouck	Series tied 2–2	W
5	April 30	1–2 OT	@ Toronto Maple Leafs	Vanbiesbrouck	Maple Leafs lead 3–2	L
6	May 2	0–1	Toronto Maple Leafs	Vanbiesbrouck	Maple Leafs win 4–2	L

Legend: W Win L Loss

== Player statistics ==
=== Scoring ===
- Position abbreviations: C = Center; D = Defense; G = Goaltender; LW = Left wing; RW = Right wing
- † = Joined team via a transaction (e.g., trade, waivers, signing) during the season. Stats reflect time with the Flyers only.
- ‡ = Left team via a transaction (e.g., trade, waivers, release) during the season. Stats reflect time with the Flyers only.

No.	Player	Pos	Regular season						Playoffs					
No.	Player	Pos	GP	G	A	Pts	+/-	PIM	GP	G	A	Pts	+/-	PIM
88	Eric Lindros	C	71	40	53	93	35	120	—	—	—	—	—	—
10	John LeClair	LW	76	43	47	90	36	30	6	3	0	3	0	12
17	Rod Brind'Amour	C	82	24	50	74	3	47	6	1	3	4	1	0
37	Eric Desjardins	D	68	15	36	51	18	38	6	2	2	4	1	0
20	Keith Jones†	RW	66	18	31	49	29	78	6	2	1	3	4	14
3	Dan McGillis	D	78	8	37	45	16	61	6	0	1	1	2	12
19	Mikael Renberg†	RW	46	11	15	26	7	14	6	0	1	1	−1	0
26	Valeri Zelepukin	LW	74	16	9	25	0	48	4	1	0	1	1	2
18	Daymond Langkow†	C	56	10	13	23	−8	24	6	0	2	2	3	2
6	Chris Therien	D	74	3	15	18	16	48	6	0	0	0	1	6
12	Colin Forbes‡	LW	66	9	7	16	0	51	—	—	—	—	—	—
8	Jody Hull	RW	72	3	11	14	−2	12	6	0	0	0	−1	4
28	Marc Bureau	C	71	4	6	10	−2	10	6	0	2	2	2	2
5	Dmitri Tertyshny	D	62	2	8	10	−1	30	1	0	0	0	0	2
9	Dainius Zubrus‡	RW	63	3	5	8	−5	25	—	—	—	—	—	—
15	Mike Maneluk‡	RW	13	2	6	8	4	8	—	—	—	—	—	—
77	Chris Gratton‡	C	26	1	7	8	−8	41	—	—	—	—	—	—
25	Steve Duchesne†	D	11	2	5	7	0	2	6	0	2	2	2	2
11	Mark Recchi†	RW	10	4	2	6	−3	6	6	0	1	1	−1	2
23	Petr Svoboda‡	D	25	4	2	6	5	28	—	—	—	—	—	—
44	Dave Babych‡	D	33	2	4	6	0	20	—	—	—	—	—	—
24 (Note: Dykhuis wore number 29 in his first two games after being re-acquired.)	Karl Dykhuis†	D	45	2	4	6	−2	32	5	1	0	1	1	4
22	Luke Richardson	D	78	0	6	6	−3	106	—	—	—	—	—	—
11 (Note: Daigle originally wore number 19 until Renberg was re-acquired.)	Alexandre Daigle‡	C	31	3	2	3	−1	2	—	—	—	—	—	—
9 (Note: Greig wore number 15 in his first three games of the season and number 23 in his next two games.)	Mark Greig	RW	7	1	3	4	1	2	2	0	1	1	1	0
11	Mike Sillinger‡	C	25	0	3	3	−9	8	—	—	—	—	—	—
29 (Note: Vopat originally wore number 24 before switching numbers with Dykhuis shortly after he was re-acquired.)	Roman Vopat†	C	48	0	3	3	−3	80	—	—	—	—	—	—
27	Ron Hextall	G	23	0	2	2		2	—	—	—	—	—	—
25	Shjon Podein‡	LW	14	1	0	1	−2	0	—	—	—	—	—	—
14	Mikael Andersson†	RW	7	0	1	1	1	0	6	0	1	1	1	2
32	Ryan Bast†	D	2	0	1	1	0	0	—	—	—	—	—	—
2	Adam Burt†	D	17	0	1	1	1	14	6	0	0	0	1	4
43	Andy Delmore	D	2	0	1	1	−1	0	—	—	—	—	—	—
15 (Note: Kovalenko wore number 25 in his first two games after being acquired.)	Andrei Kovalenko†‡	RW	13	0	1	1	−5	2	—	—	—	—	—	—
21	Sandy McCarthy†	RW	13	0	1	1	−2	25	6	0	1	1	1	0
34	John Vanbiesbrouck	G	62	0	1	1		12	6	0	0	0		2
32 (Note: Berube wore number 12 in his first six games after being acquired.)	Craig Berube†	LW	11	0	0	0	−3	28	6	1	0	1	1	4
25	Chris Joseph	D	2	0	0	0	0	2	—	—	—	—	—	—
20	Trent Klatt‡	RW	2	0	0	0	0	0	—	—	—	—	—	—
21	Dan Kordic	LW	2	0	0	0	−1	2	—	—	—	—	—	—
15	Richard Park	C	7	0	0	0	−1	0	—	—	—	—	—	—
49	Jean-Marc Pelletier	G	1	0	0	0		0	—	—	—	—	—	—
54	Brian Wesenberg	RW	1	0	0	0	1	5	—	—	—	—	—	—
14	Peter White	C	3	0	0	0	0	0	—	—	—	—	—	—
40	Jason Zent	LW	2	0	0	0	0	0	—	—	—	—	—	—

=== Goaltending ===
No.	Player	Regular season											Playoffs									
No.	Player	GP	GS	W	L	T	SA	GA	GAA	SV%	SO	TOI	GP	GS	W	L	SA	GA	GAA	SV%	SO	TOI
34	John Vanbiesbrouck	62	61	27	18	15	1380	135	2.19	.902	6	3,712	6	6	2	4	146	9	1.46	.938	1	369
27	Ron Hextall	23	19	10	7	4	464	52	2.52	.888	0	1,235	—	—	—	—	—	—	—	—	—	—
49	Jean-Marc Pelletier	1	1	0	1	0	29	5	5.00	.828	0	60	—	—	—	—	—	—	—	—	—	—

== Awards and records ==
=== Awards ===
Type	Award/honor	Recipient	Ref
League (annual)	Bud Light Plus-Minus Award	John LeClair	
League (annual)	NHL second All-Star team	Eric Desjardins (Defense)	
League (annual)	NHL second All-Star team	John LeClair (Left wing)	
League (in-season)	NHL All-Star Game selection	John LeClair	
League (in-season)	NHL All-Star Game selection	Eric Lindros	
League (in-season)	NHL Player of the Month	Eric Lindros (November)	
League (in-season)	NHL Player of the Week	John LeClair (November 30)	
League (in-season)	NHL Player of the Week	Eric Lindros (January 18)	
Team	Barry Ashbee Trophy	Eric Desjardins	
Team	Bobby Clarke Trophy	Eric Lindros	
Team	Pelle Lindbergh Memorial Trophy	Daymond Langkow	
Team	Yanick Dupre Memorial Class Guy Award	Eric Desjardins	

=== Records ===
Among the team records set during the 1998–99 season was Eric Lindros tying the team record for most points during a single period (4) on November 14. Lindros replicated this feat two weeks later on November 29, also tying the team record for most assists in a period (4), while John LeClair tied team records for goals scored in a regular season game (4) and period (3). From January 7 to January 13, the Flyers tied a team record with four straight shutouts. January 7 was also the first of 18 consecutive games until February 18 that Lindros recorded at least one point, tying Bobby Clarke’s team record set during the 1974–75 season. The season finale on April 18 was the 484th and final game of Rod Brind'Amour’s franchise record consecutive games streak. The Flyers nine goals allowed is the team record for the fewest allowed during a single playoff season.

1998–99 was the final NHL season for longtime Flyers goaltender Ron Hextall, who holds several career records for the team. Serving in a backup role to starter John Vanbiesbrouck, Hextall was able to surpass Bernie Parent for games played by a goaltender (489) and wins (240) during the season. He also holds the team playoff career goalie marks for games played (84), wins (45), and minutes played (4,928). Hextall holds the NHL career records for most penalty minutes by a goaltender in the regular season (569) and playoffs (115), and is one of only two goalies to score a goal during a Stanley Cup playoffs game.

=== Milestones ===
Milestone	Player	Date	Ref
First game	Mike Maneluk	October 9, 1998	
First game	Dmitri Tertyshny	October 11, 1998	
First game	Ryan Bast	November 1, 1998	
First game	Andy Delmore	November 1, 1998	
First game	Jean-Marc Pelletier	March 4, 1999	
First game	Brian Wesenberg	April 10, 1999	

== Transactions ==
The Flyers were involved in the following transactions from June 17, 1998, the day after the deciding game of the 1998 Stanley Cup Final, through June 19, 1999, the day of the deciding game of the 1999 Stanley Cup Final.

=== Trades ===
Date	Details		Ref
June 26, 1998	To Philadelphia Flyers: 7th-round pick in 1998	To Nashville Predators: Dominic Roussel; Jeff Staples	
June 27, 1998	To Philadelphia Flyers: NY Islanders' 5th-round pick in 1998	To Chicago Blackhawks: Paul Coffey (Note: The Flyers also agreed to pay $1 million of Coffey's salary.)	
June 27, 1998	To Philadelphia Flyers: 9th-round pick in 1998	To Dallas Stars: 9th-round pick in 1999	
August 6, 1998	To Philadelphia Flyers: 7th-round pick in 1999	To San Jose Sharks: Rights to Johan Hedberg	
August 25, 1998	To Philadelphia Flyers: 6th-round pick in 2000	To New York Islanders: Rights to Ray Giroux	
October 5, 1998	To Philadelphia Flyers: Valeri Zelepukin	To Edmonton Oilers: Daniel Lacroix	
October 13, 1998	To Philadelphia Flyers: Rights to Ryan Bast; 8th-round pick in 1999	To Calgary Flames: 3rd-round pick in 1999	
October 19, 1998	To Philadelphia Flyers: 6th-round pick in 2000	To Vancouver Canucks: Trent Klatt (Note: The Flyers also agreed to pay $1 million over three seasons of Klatt's salary.)	
November 12, 1998	To Philadelphia Flyers: Keith Jones	To Colorado Avalanche: Shjon Podein	
November 17, 1998	To Philadelphia Flyers: Roman Vopat	To Chicago Blackhawks: Mike Maneluk	
December 12, 1998	To Philadelphia Flyers: Daymond Langkow; Mikael Renberg	To Tampa Bay Lightning: Chris Gratton; Mike Sillinger	
December 28, 1998	To Philadelphia Flyers: Karl Dykhuis	To Tampa Bay Lightning: Petr Svoboda	
January 8, 1999	To Philadelphia Flyers: Dennis Bonvie	To Chicago Blackhawks: Frank Bialowas	
January 26, 1999	To Philadelphia Flyers: Future considerations	To Nashville Predators: Sergei Klimentiev	
January 29, 1999	To Philadelphia Flyers: Andrei Kovalenko	To Edmonton Oilers: Alexandre Daigle	
February 10, 1999	To Philadelphia Flyers: Sean O'Brien	To Pittsburgh Penguins: Future considerations	
March 6, 1999	To Philadelphia Flyers: Adam Burt	To Carolina Hurricanes: Andrei Kovalenko	
March 10, 1999	To Philadelphia Flyers: Mark Recchi	To Montreal Canadiens: Dainius Zubrus; Choice of a 2nd-round pick (Note: The Canadiens had the choice of receiving the Flyers' second-round pick in 1999 or 2000. The Canadiens chose the 1999 second-round pick.); Choice of a 6th or 7th-round pick (Note: The Canadiens had the choice of receiving the San Jose Sharks' seventh-round pick in 1999 or the New York Islanders' sixth-round pick in 2000. The Canadiens chose the Islanders' sixth-round pick.)	
March 20, 1999	To Philadelphia Flyers: Mikael Andersson; Sandy McCarthy	To Tampa Bay Lightning: Colin Forbes; Conditional draft pick in 1999 or 2000 (Note: Tampa Bay received the Flyers' 1999 fifth-round pick.)	
March 23, 1999	To Philadelphia Flyers: Craig Berube	To Washington Capitals: Future considerations	
March 23, 1999	To Philadelphia Flyers: Steve Duchesne	To Los Angeles Kings: Dave Babych; 5th-round pick in 2000	
May 25, 1999	To Philadelphia Flyers: Rights to Francis Lessard	To Carolina Hurricanes: 8th-round pick in 1999	
June 1, 1999	To Philadelphia Flyers: 6th-round pick in 1999	To Vancouver Canucks: Rights to Pat Kavanagh	

=== Players acquired ===
Date	Player	Former team	Term	Via	Ref
July 6, 1998	Marc Bureau	Montreal Canadiens	3-year	Free agency	
July 7, 1998	John Vanbiesbrouck	Florida Panthers	3-year (Note: Third year is option year)	Free agency	
July 9, 1998	Sergei Klimentiev	Rochester Americans (AHL)	2-year	Free agency	
July 28, 1998	Mark Eaton	University of Notre Dame (CCHA)	3-year	Free agency	
August 3, 1998	David MacIsaac	Philadelphia Phantoms (AHL)	1-year	Free agency	
August 4, 1998	Mark Greig	Grand Rapids Griffins (IHL)	2-year	Free agency	
August 4, 1998	Jason Zent	Ottawa Senators	2-year	Free agency	
August 17, 1998	Steve McLaren	Indianapolis Ice (IHL)	1-year	Free agency	
August 24, 1998	Richard Park	Anaheim Mighty Ducks	1-year	Free agency	
October 7, 1998	Jody Hull	Tampa Bay Lightning	2-year	Free agency	

=== Players lost ===
Date	Player	New team	Via (Note: In parentheses is the player's free agency group on July 1 if applicable.)	Ref
June 26, 1998	Craig Darby	Nashville Predators	Expansion draft	
August 6, 1998	Jamie Heward	Nashville Predators	Free agency	
September 5, 1998	Joel Otto		Retirement (III)	
September 11, 1998	Sean Burke	Florida Panthers	Free agency (III)	
N/A	John Druce	Hannover Scorpions (DEL)	Free agency	
October 14, 1998	Kjell Samuelsson	Tampa Bay Lightning	Free agency (III)	
October 16, 1998	Travis Van Tighem	Houston Aeros (IHL)	Free agency (UFA)	
December 29, 1998	Brett Bruininks	Florida Everblades (ECHL)	Free agency (UFA)	
February 10, 1999	John Stevens		Retirement	

=== Signings ===
Date	Player	Term	Contract type	Ref
June 22, 1998	Neil Little	1-year	Re-signing	
June 25, 1998	Eric Lindros	1-year	Re-signing	
July 15, 1998	Paul Healey	2-year	Re-signing	
July 15, 1998	Ron Hextall	1-year	Extension	
July 15, 1998	Jeff Lank	2-year	Extension	
July 16, 1998	Dmitri Tertyshny	2-year	Entry-level	
August 3, 1998	Mike Maneluk	1-year	Re-signing	
August 3, 1998	John Stevens	2-year	Re-signing	
August 13, 1998	Trent Klatt	1-year (Note: Klatt later signed a two-year contract extension.)	Arbitration award	
August 14, 1998	Rod Brind’Amour	3-year	Re-signing	
August 17, 1998	Peter White	3-year	Re-signing	
September 1, 1998	Daniel Lacroix	1-year	Re-signing	
March 30, 1999	Eric Desjardins	4-year	Extension	
May 10, 1999	Mark Recchi	5-year	Extension	

== Draft picks ==
Philadelphia's picks at the 1998 NHL entry draft, which was held at the Marine Midland Arena in Buffalo, New York, on June 27, 1998. The Flyers traded their third-round pick, 81st overall, to the Vancouver Canucks for Dave Babych and the Flyers' fifth-round pick, 139th overall, on March 24, 1998.

Round	Pick	Player	Position	Nationality	Team (league)	Notes
1	22	Simon Gagne	Left wing	Canada	Quebec Remparts (QMJHL)	
2	42	Jason Beckett	Defense	Canada	Seattle Thunderbirds (WHL)	(Note: The Flyers traded Janne Niinimaa to the Edmonton Oilers for Dan McGillis and the Oilers' second-round pick, 42nd overall, on March 24, 1998.)
2	51	Ian Forbes	Defense	Canada	Guelph Storm (OHL)	
4	109	J. P. Morin	Defense	Canada	Drummondville Voltigeurs (QMJHL)	
5	124	Francis Belanger	Left wing	Canada	Rimouski Océanic (QMJHL)	(Note: The Flyers traded Paul Coffey to the Chicago Blackhawks for the New York Islanders' fifth-round pick, 124th overall, on June 27, 1998.)
5	139	Garrett Prosofsky	Center	Canada	Saskatoon Blades (WHL)	
6	168	Antero Niittymaki	Goaltender	Finland	TPS (SM-liiga)	
7	175	Cam Ondrik	Goaltender	Canada	Medicine Hat Tigers (WHL)	(Note: The Flyers traded Dominic Roussel and Jeff Staples to the Nashville Predators for the Predators' seventh-round pick, 175th overall, on June 26, 1998.)
7	195	Tomas Divisek	Right wing	Czech Republic	HC Slavia Praha (CZE)	
8	222	Lubomir Pistek	Right wing	Slovakia	HC Slovan Bratislava (Slovakia)	
9	243	Petr Hubacek	Center	Czech Republic	HC Kometa Brno (Czech)	(Note: The Flyers received the 243rd overall pick as compensation for losing Michel Petit as a free agent.)
9	253	Bruno St. Jacques	Defense	Canada	Baie-Comeau Drakkar (QMJHL)	
9	258	Sergei Skrobot	Defense	Russia	Dynamo-2 Moscow (RUS)	(Note: The Flyers traded their 1999 ninth-round pick to the Dallas Stars for the Stars' ninth-round pick, 258th overall, on June 27, 1998.)

== Farm teams ==
The Flyers were affiliated with the Philadelphia Phantoms of the AHL.
