= 1998–99 Toronto Maple Leafs season =

NHL hockey team season

1998–99 Toronto Maple Leafs
- Division: 2nd Northeast
- Conference: 4th Eastern
- 1998–99 record: 45–30–7
- Home record: 23–13–5
- Road record: 22–17–2
- Goals for: 268
- Goals against: 231

Team information
- General manager: Ken Dryden
- Coach: Pat Quinn
- Captain: Mats Sundin
- Arena: Maple Leaf Gardens (Oct.–Feb.); Air Canada Centre (Feb.–May)
- Average attendance: 16,765
- Minor league affiliate: St. John's Maple Leafs

Team leaders
- Goals: Sergei Berezin (37)
- Assists: Mats Sundin (52)
- Points: Mats Sundin (83)
- Penalty minutes: Tie Domi (198)
- Plus/minus: Alexander Karpovtsev (+38)
- Wins: Curtis Joseph (35)
- Goals against average: Curtis Joseph (2.56)

The 1998–99 Toronto Maple Leafs season was the franchise's 82nd season. Two moves occurred this season. First, the club moved from the Western to the Eastern Conference of the National Hockey League (NHL). Secondly, the club moved from Maple Leaf Gardens to the new Air Canada Centre. Toronto qualified for the Stanley Cup playoffs after missing the prior two years, and made it to the Eastern Conference Finals before losing to the Buffalo Sabres.

== Off-season ==
The Toronto Maple Leafs moved from the Central Division of the Western Conference to the Northeast Division of the Eastern Conference.

== Regular season ==
The 1998–99 season was a tremendous improvement for the Maple Leafs over the 1997–98 season and the team got plenty of help from its new members, including Bryan Berard, Sylvain Cote, Curtis Joseph, Alexander Karpovtsev (who led the NHL in plus-minus with +39, but was not eligible for the NHL Plus-Minus Award because he played just 58 games), Yanic Perreault and Steve Thomas (who finished second on the team in points, with 73). Former Vancouver Canucks head coach Pat Quinn replaced Mike Murphy as Toronto's head coach. Six Maple Leafs scored 20 or more goals. Toronto set a club record for most regular season wins (45) and earned 97 points to finish second in the Northeast Division and fourth in the Eastern Conference. They led the NHL in most goals for, with 268, and were the only team to score 200 or more even-strength goals.

On November 12, 1998, the Maple Leafs defeated the Chicago Blackhawks 10–3 away. Mats Sundin recorded a hat trick in the game, which was the first regular season game in which the Leafs had scored ten goals since February 17, 1989, when they defeated the New York Rangers 10–6 away.

=== Maple Leaf Gardens ===
- On February 13, 1999, the Maple Leafs ended a 67-year tradition when they played their last game at Maple Leaf Gardens. The team lost 6–2 to the Chicago Blackhawks. Former Maple Leaf Doug Gilmour scored a fluke goal in that game and notorious tough guy Bob Probert scored the final NHL goal in Gardens history in the game's third period. During the emotional post-game ceremony, legendary Canadian singer Anne Murray performed "The Maple Leaf Forever" while wearing a Toronto jersey. The Leafs were the last of the Original Six teams to leave their Original Six-era arena, three years after the Canadiens did so.

=== Air Canada Centre ===
- The first Maple Leafs home game took place on February 20, 1999, against the Montreal Canadiens, won by the Leafs 3–2 on an overtime goal by Steve Thomas.

=== Season standings ===
Northeast Division
| R | CR | | GP | W | L | T | GF | GA | PIM | Pts |
|---|---|---|---|---|---|---|---|---|---|---|
| 1 | 2 | **Ottawa Senators** | 82 | 44 | 23 | 15 | 239 | 179 | 892 | 103 |
| 2 | 4 | **Toronto Maple Leafs** | 82 | 45 | 30 | 7 | 268 | 231 | 1095 | 97 |
| 3 | 6 | **Boston Bruins** | 82 | 39 | 30 | 13 | 214 | 181 | 1182 | 91 |
| 4 | 7 | **Buffalo Sabres** | 82 | 37 | 28 | 17 | 207 | 175 | 1561 | 91 |
| 5 | 11 | Montreal Canadiens | 82 | 32 | 39 | 11 | 184 | 209 | 1299 | 75 |

Note: CR = Conference rank; GP = Games played; W = Wins; L = Losses; T = Ties; GF = Goals for; GA = Goals against; Pts = Points
Bolded teams qualified for the playoffs.

Eastern Conference
| R | | Div | GP | W | L | T | GF | GA | Pts |
|---|---|---|---|---|---|---|---|---|---|
| **1** | **y – New Jersey Devils** | **ATL** | **82** | **47** | **24** | **11** | **248** | **196** | **105** |
| **2** | **y – Ottawa Senators** | **NE** | **82** | **44** | **23** | **15** | **239** | **179** | **103** |
| **3** | **y – Carolina Hurricanes** | **SE** | **82** | **34** | **30** | **18** | **210** | **202** | **86** |
| **4** | **Toronto Maple Leafs** | **NE** | **82** | **45** | **30** | **7** | **268** | **231** | **97** |
| **5** | **Philadelphia Flyers** | **ATL** | **82** | **37** | **26** | **19** | **231** | **196** | **93** |
| **6** | **Boston Bruins** | **NE** | **82** | **39** | **30** | **13** | **214** | **181** | **91** |
| **7** | **Buffalo Sabres** | **NE** | **82** | **37** | **28** | **17** | **207** | **175** | **91** |
| **8** | **Pittsburgh Penguins** | **ATL** | **82** | **38** | **30** | **14** | **242** | **225** | **90** |
| 9 | Florida Panthers | SE | 82 | 30 | 34 | 18 | 210 | 228 | 78 |
| 10 | New York Rangers | ATL | 82 | 33 | 38 | 11 | 217 | 227 | 77 |
| 11 | Montreal Canadiens | NE | 82 | 32 | 39 | 11 | 184 | 209 | 75 |
| 12 | Washington Capitals | SE | 82 | 31 | 45 | 6 | 200 | 218 | 68 |
| 13 | New York Islanders | ATL | 82 | 24 | 48 | 10 | 194 | 244 | 58 |
| 14 | Tampa Bay Lightning | SE | 82 | 19 | 54 | 9 | 179 | 292 | 47 |

Divisions: ATL – Atlantic Division, NE – Northeast Division, SE – Southeast Division

bold – Qualified for playoffs; y – Won division

== Playoffs ==
=== Eastern Conference Finals ===
The Maple Leafs and Buffalo Sabres met in the Eastern Conference Finals. The Maple Leafs were coming off a six-game series win over the Pittsburgh Penguins, while the Sabres were coming off a six-game series win themselves, over the Boston Bruins. Toronto was having its best playoff since 1994, when they last made a Conference Final series. Buffalo, meanwhile, was in the third round for the second consecutive year. With the series victory, the Sabres advanced to the Stanley Cup Final for the first time in 24 years.

== Schedule and results ==
=== Regular season ===
1998–99 regular season
October: 5–4–1 (home: 1–2–1; road: 4–2–0)

| Game | Date | Score | Opponent | Record | Recap |
|---|---|---|---|---|---|
| 1 | October 10, 1998 | 2–1 | Detroit Red Wings (1998–99) | 1–0–0 | W |
| 2 | October 13, 1998 | 3–2 | @ Edmonton Oilers (1998–99) | 2–0–0 | W |
| 3 | October 16, 1998 | 7–3 | @ Calgary Flames (1998–99) | 3–0–0 | W |
| 4 | October 17, 1998 | 1–4 | @ Vancouver Canucks (1998–99) | 3–1–0 | L |
| 5 | October 19, 1998 | 2–2 OT | Nashville Predators (1998–99) | 3–1–1 | T |
| 6 | October 23, 1998 | 5–3 | @ Detroit Red Wings (1998–99) | 4–1–1 | W |
| 7 | October 24, 1998 | 6–4 | @ Pittsburgh Penguins (1998–99) | 5–1–1 | W |
| 8 | October 26, 1998 | 0–2 | Pittsburgh Penguins (1998–99) | 5–2–1 | L |
| 9 | October 30, 1998 | 1–4 | @ Buffalo Sabres (1998–99) | 5–3–1 | L |
| 10 | October 31, 1998 | 3–6 | Buffalo Sabres (1998–99) | 5–4–1 | L |

November: 8–5–1 (home: 7–1–1; road: 1–4–0)

| Game | Date | Score | Opponent | Record | Recap |
|---|---|---|---|---|---|
| 11 | November 4, 1998 | 3–0 | Colorado Avalanche (1998–99) | 6–4–1 | W |
| 12 | November 5, 1998 | 1–4 | @ Boston Bruins (1998–99) | 6–5–1 | L |
| 13 | November 7, 1998 | 6–6 OT | New York Rangers (1998–99) | 6–5–2 | T |
| 14 | November 9, 1998 | 1–3 | New York Islanders (1998–99) | 6–6–2 | L |
| 15 | November 11, 1998 | 3–2 | Edmonton Oilers (1998–99) | 7–6–2 | W |
| 16 | November 12, 1998 | 10–3 | @ Chicago Blackhawks (1998–99) | 8–6–2 | W |
| 17 | November 14, 1998 | 2–1 | Ottawa Senators (1998–99) | 9–6–2 | W |
| 18 | November 18, 1998 | 1–4 | @ Washington Capitals (1998–99) | 9–7–2 | L |
| 19 | November 20, 1998 | 1–4 | @ Buffalo Sabres (1998–99) | 9–8–2 | L |
| 20 | November 21, 1998 | 2–1 | Buffalo Sabres (1998–99) | 10–8–2 | W |
| 21 | November 23, 1998 | 3–2 | Calgary Flames (1998–99) | 11–8–2 | W |
| 22 | November 25, 1998 | 5–1 | Vancouver Canucks (1998–99) | 12–8–2 | W |
| 23 | November 27, 1998 | 3–4 | @ Philadelphia Flyers (1998–99) | 12–9–2 | L |
| 24 | November 28, 1998 | 3–2 OT | Ottawa Senators (1998–99) | 13–9–2 | W |

December: 8–4–0 (home: 5–3–0; road: 3–1–0)

| Game | Date | Score | Opponent | Record | Recap |
|---|---|---|---|---|---|
| 25 | December 2, 1998 | 3–1 | Los Angeles Kings (1998–99) | 14–9–2 | W |
| 26 | December 5, 1998 | 4–3 OT | @ Montreal Canadiens (1998–99) | 15–9–2 | W |
| 27 | December 7, 1998 | 2–6 | @ New York Rangers (1998–99) | 15–10–2 | L |
| 28 | December 11, 1998 | 3–2 | @ Chicago Blackhawks (1998–99) | 16–10–2 | W |
| 29 | December 12, 1998 | 0–3 | Philadelphia Flyers (1998–99) | 16–11–2 | L |
| 30 | December 16, 1998 | 5–2 | Phoenix Coyotes (1998–99) | 17–11–2 | W |
| 31 | December 19, 1998 | 7–4 | New York Rangers (1998–99) | 18–11–2 | W |
| 32 | December 21, 1998 | 7–1 | Pittsburgh Penguins (1998–99) | 19–11–2 | W |
| 33 | December 23, 1998 | 1–5 | Dallas Stars (1998–99) | 19–12–2 | L |
| 34 | December 26, 1998 | 1–2 | Montreal Canadiens (1998–99) | 19–13–2 | L |
| 35 | December 30, 1998 | 4–1 | Mighty Ducks of Anaheim (1998–99) | 20–13–2 | W |
| 36 | December 31, 1998 | 4–2 | @ Detroit Red Wings (1998–99) | 21–13–2 | W |

January: 7–4–1 (home: 3–1–0; road: 4–3–1)

| Game | Date | Score | Opponent | Record | Recap |
|---|---|---|---|---|---|
| 37 | January 2, 1999 | 2–5 | Washington Capitals (1998–99) | 21–14–2 | L |
| 38 | January 4, 1999 | 5–4 OT | Tampa Bay Lightning (1998–99) | 22–14–2 | W |
| 39 | January 7, 1999 | 1–2 | @ Boston Bruins (1998–99) | 22–15–2 | L |
| 40 | January 9, 1999 | 6–3 | Boston Bruins (1998–99) | 23–15–2 | W |
| 41 | January 12, 1999 | 4–3 | @ Tampa Bay Lightning (1998–99) | 24–15–2 | W |
| 42 | January 13, 1999 | 3–3 OT | @ Florida Panthers (1998–99) | 24–15–3 | T |
| 43 | January 16, 1999 | 4–3 | @ Philadelphia Flyers (1998–99) | 25–15–3 | W |
| 44 | January 18, 1999 | 2–4 | @ Carolina Hurricanes (1998–99) | 25–16–3 | L |
| 45 | January 20, 1999 | 6–4 | @ Dallas Stars (1998–99) | 26–16–3 | W |
| 46 | January 21, 1999 | 4–2 | @ St. Louis Blues (1998–99) | 27–16–3 | W |
| 47 | January 28, 1999 | 0–6 | @ Pittsburgh Penguins (1998–99) | 27–17–3 | L |
| 48 | January 30, 1999 | 5–3 | Washington Capitals (1998–99) | 28–17–3 | W |

February: 6–4–2 (home: 2–2–1; road: 4–2–1)

| Game | Date | Score | Opponent | Record | Recap |
|---|---|---|---|---|---|
| 49 | February 2, 1999 | 3–0 | @ Tampa Bay Lightning (1998–99) | 29–17–3 | W |
| 50 | February 3, 1999 | 2–5 | @ Florida Panthers (1998–99) | 29–18–3 | L |
| 51 | February 6, 1999 | 3–2 | @ New Jersey Devils (1998–99) | 30–18–3 | W |
| 52 | February 10, 1999 | 5–6 | Carolina Hurricanes (1998–99) | 30–19–3 | L |
| 53 | February 13, 1999 | 2–6 | Chicago Blackhawks (1998–99) | 30–20–3 | L |
| 54 | February 15, 1999 | 3–3 OT | @ New Jersey Devils (1998–99) | 30–20–4 | T |
| 55 | February 17, 1999 | 3–2 OT | @ Buffalo Sabres (1998–99) | 31–20–4 | W |
| 56 | February 20, 1999 | 3–2 OT | Montreal Canadiens (1998–99) | 32–20–4 | W |
| 57 | February 22, 1999 | 3–4 | @ Washington Capitals (1998–99) | 32–21–4 | L |
| 58 | February 24, 1999 | 2–2 OT | Carolina Hurricanes (1998–99) | 32–21–5 | T |
| 59 | February 25, 1999 | 4–1 | @ New York Islanders (1998–99) | 33–21–5 | W |
| 60 | February 27, 1999 | 4–1 | Florida Panthers (1998–99) | 34–21–5 | W |

March: 6–7–1 (home: 2–4–1; road: 4–3–0)

| Game | Date | Score | Opponent | Record | Recap |
|---|---|---|---|---|---|
| 61 | March 3, 1999 | 2–5 | New Jersey Devils (1998–99) | 34–22–5 | L |
| 62 | March 4, 1999 | 4–0 | @ St. Louis Blues (1998–99) | 35–22–5 | W |
| 63 | March 6, 1999 | 1–3 | @ Ottawa Senators (1998–99) | 35–23–5 | L |
| 64 | March 8, 1999 | 2–3 OT | @ New York Rangers (1998–99) | 35–24–5 | L |
| 65 | March 9, 1999 | 6–1 | Tampa Bay Lightning (1998–99) | 36–24–5 | W |
| 66 | March 11, 1999 | 2–1 | @ New York Islanders (1998–99) | 37–24–5 | W |
| 67 | March 13, 1999 | 1–2 | @ Montreal Canadiens (1998–99) | 37–25–5 | L |
| 68 | March 17, 1999 | 1–4 | Boston Bruins (1998–99) | 37–26–5 | L |
| 69 | March 20, 1999 | 3–1 | New Jersey Devils (1998–99) | 38–26–5 | W |
| 70 | March 22, 1999 | 1–3 | Philadelphia Flyers (1998–99) | 38–27–5 | L |
| 71 | March 24, 1999 | 5–8 | San Jose Sharks (1998–99) | 38–28–5 | L |
| 72 | March 26, 1999 | 7–2 | @ Carolina Hurricanes (1998–99) | 39–28–5 | W |
| 73 | March 27, 1999 | 2–2 OT | Boston Bruins (1998–99) | 39–28–6 | T |
| 74 | March 31, 1999 | 6–5 | @ Vancouver Canucks (1998–99) | 40–28–6 | W |

April: 5–2–1 (home: 3–0–1; road: 2–2–0)

| Game | Date | Score | Opponent | Record | Recap |
|---|---|---|---|---|---|
| 75 | April 1, 1999 | 5–1 | @ Edmonton Oilers (1998–99) | 41–28–6 | W |
| 76 | April 3, 1999 | 5–1 | @ Calgary Flames (1998–99) | 42–28–6 | W |
| 77 | April 5, 1999 | 2–2 OT | St. Louis Blues (1998–99) | 42–28–7 | T |
| 78 | April 7, 1999 | 4–2 | Ottawa Senators (1998–99) | 43–28–7 | W |
| 79 | April 8, 1999 | 1–3 | @ Ottawa Senators (1998–99) | 43–29–7 | L |
| 80 | April 10, 1999 | 9–1 | Florida Panthers (1998–99) | 44–29–7 | W |
| 81 | April 14, 1999 | 3–2 OT | New York Islanders (1998–99) | 45–29–7 | W |
| 82 | April 17, 1999 | 2–3 | @ Montreal Canadiens (1998–99) | 45–30–7 | L |

Legend: W Win (2 points) L Loss (0 points) T Tie (1 point)

=== Playoffs ===
1999 Stanley Cup playoffs
Eastern Conference Quarterfinals vs. (5) Philadelphia Flyers – Maple Leafs win 4–2

| Game | Date | Score | Opponent | Series | Recap |
|---|---|---|---|---|---|
| 1 | April 22, 1999 | 0–3 | Philadelphia Flyers | Flyers lead 1–0 | L |
| 2 | April 24, 1999 | 2–1 | Philadelphia Flyers | Series tied 1–1 | W |
| 3 | April 26, 1999 | 2–1 | @ Philadelphia Flyers | Maple Leafs lead 2–1 | W |
| 4 | April 28, 1999 | 2–5 | @ Philadelphia Flyers | Series tied 2–2 | L |
| 5 | April 30, 1999 | 2–1 OT | Philadelphia Flyers | Maple Leafs lead 3–2 | W |
| 6 | May 2, 1999 | 1–0 | @ Philadelphia Flyers | Maple Leafs win 4–2 | W |

Eastern Conference Semifinals vs. (8) Pittsburgh Penguins – Maple Leafs win 4–2

| Game | Date | Score | Opponent | Series | Recap |
|---|---|---|---|---|---|
| 1 | May 7, 1999 | 0–2 | Pittsburgh Penguins | Penguins lead 1–0 | L |
| 2 | May 9, 1999 | 4–2 | Pittsburgh Penguins | Series tied 1–1 | W |
| 3 | May 11, 1999 | 3–4 | @ Pittsburgh Penguins | Penguins lead 2–1 | L |
| 4 | May 13, 1999 | 3–2 OT | @ Pittsburgh Penguins | Series tied 2–2 | W |
| 5 | May 15, 1999 | 4–1 | Pittsburgh Penguins | Maple Leafs lead 3–2 | W |
| 6 | May 17, 1999 | 4–3 OT | @ Pittsburgh Penguins | Maple Leafs win 4–2 | W |

Eastern Conference Finals vs. (7) Buffalo Sabres – Sabres win 4–1

| Game | Date | Score | Opponent | Series | Recap |
|---|---|---|---|---|---|
| 1 | May 23, 1999 | 4–5 | Buffalo Sabres | Sabres lead 1–0 | L |
| 2 | May 25, 1999 | 6–3 | Buffalo Sabres | Series tied 1–1 | W |
| 3 | May 27, 1999 | 2–4 | @ Buffalo Sabres | Sabres lead 2–1 | L |
| 4 | May 29, 1999 | 2–5 | @ Buffalo Sabres | Sabres lead 3–1 | L |
| 5 | May 31, 1999 | 2–4 | Buffalo Sabres | Sabres win 4–1 | L |

Legend: W Win L Loss

== Player statistics ==
=== Scoring ===
- Position abbreviations: C = Centre; D = Defence; G = Goaltender; LW = Left wing; RW = Right wing
- † = Joined team via a transaction (e.g., trade, waivers, signing) during the season. Stats reflect time with the Maple Leafs only.
- ‡ = Left team via a transaction (e.g., trade, waivers, release) during the season. Stats reflect time with the Maple Leafs only.

| No. | Player | Pos | Regular season | | | | | | Playoffs | | | | | |
| No. | Player | Pos | GP | G | A | Pts | +/- | PIM | GP | G | A | Pts | +/- | PIM |
|---|---|---|---|---|---|---|---|---|---|---|---|---|---|---|
| 13 | Mats Sundin | C | 82 | 31 | 52 | 83 | 22 | 58 | 17 | 8 | 8 | 16 | 2 | 16 |
| 32 | Steve Thomas | LW | 78 | 28 | 45 | 73 | 26 | 33 | 17 | 6 | 3 | 9 | −1 | 12 |
| 94 | Sergei Berezin | RW | 76 | 37 | 22 | 59 | 16 | 12 | 17 | 6 | 6 | 12 | 0 | 4 |
| 7 | Derek King | LW | 81 | 24 | 28 | 52 | 15 | 20 | 16 | 1 | 3 | 4 | 0 | 4 |
| 22 | Igor Korolev | RW | 66 | 13 | 34 | 47 | 11 | 46 | 1 | 0 | 0 | 0 | 0 | 0 |
| 20 | Mike Johnson | RW | 79 | 20 | 24 | 44 | 13 | 35 | 17 | 3 | 2 | 5 | −1 | 4 |
| 11 | Steve Sullivan | C | 63 | 20 | 20 | 40 | 12 | 28 | 13 | 3 | 3 | 6 | −3 | 14 |
| 19 | Fredrik Modin | LW | 67 | 16 | 15 | 31 | 14 | 35 | 8 | 0 | 0 | 0 | −2 | 6 |
| 10 | Garry Valk | LW | 77 | 8 | 21 | 29 | 8 | 53 | 17 | 3 | 4 | 7 | −1 | 22 |
| 3 | Sylvain Cote | D | 79 | 5 | 24 | 29 | 22 | 28 | 17 | 2 | 1 | 3 | −3 | 10 |
| 36 | Dmitri Yushkevich | D | 78 | 6 | 22 | 28 | 25 | 88 | 17 | 1 | 5 | 6 | 7 | 22 |
| 52 | Alexander Karpovtsev† | D | 56 | 2 | 25 | 27 | 38 | 52 | 14 | 1 | 3 | 4 | −7 | 12 |
| 18 | Alyn McCauley | C | 39 | 9 | 15 | 24 | 7 | 2 | — | — | — | — | — | — |
| 28 | Tie Domi | RW | 72 | 8 | 14 | 22 | 5 | 198 | 14 | 0 | 2 | 2 | −1 | 24 |
| 15 | Tomas Kaberle | D | 57 | 4 | 18 | 22 | 3 | 12 | 14 | 0 | 3 | 3 | 0 | 2 |
| 8 | Todd Warriner | LW | 53 | 9 | 10 | 19 | −6 | 28 | 9 | 0 | 0 | 0 | 0 | 2 |
| 34 | Bryan Berard† | D | 38 | 5 | 14 | 19 | 7 | 22 | 17 | 1 | 8 | 9 | −10 | 8 |
| 44 | Yanic Perreault† | C | 12 | 7 | 8 | 15 | 10 | 12 | 17 | 3 | 6 | 9 | −6 | 6 |
| 25 | Jason Smith‡ | D | 60 | 2 | 11 | 13 | −9 | 40 | — | — | — | — | — | — |
| 55 | Danny Markov | D | 57 | 4 | 8 | 12 | 5 | 47 | 17 | 0 | 6 | 6 | 9 | 18 |
| 38 | Yannick Tremblay | D | 35 | 2 | 7 | 9 | 0 | 16 | — | — | — | — | — | — |
| 14 | Darby Hendrickson‡ | C | 35 | 2 | 3 | 5 | −4 | 30 | — | — | — | — | — | — |
| 31 | Curtis Joseph | G | 67 | 0 | 5 | 5 | | 6 | 17 | 0 | 0 | 0 | | 2 |
| 12 | Kris King | LW | 67 | 2 | 2 | 4 | −16 | 105 | 17 | 1 | 1 | 2 | −1 | 25 |
| 39 | Ladislav Kohn | RW | 16 | 1 | 3 | 4 | 1 | 4 | 2 | 0 | 0 | 0 | 0 | 5 |
| 16 | Lonny Bohonos | RW | 7 | 3 | 0 | 3 | 3 | 4 | 9 | 3 | 6 | 9 | 3 | 2 |
| 2 | Dallas Eakins | D | 18 | 0 | 2 | 2 | 3 | 24 | 1 | 0 | 0 | 0 | 0 | 0 |
| 33 | Chris McAllister† | D | 20 | 0 | 2 | 2 | 4 | 39 | 6 | 0 | 1 | 1 | −1 | 4 |
| 42 | Kevyn Adams | C | 1 | 0 | 0 | 0 | 0 | 0 | 7 | 0 | 2 | 2 | −2 | 14 |
| 4 | Kevin Dahl | D | 3 | 0 | 0 | 0 | 0 | 2 | — | — | — | — | — | — |
| 30 | Glenn Healy | G | 9 | 0 | 0 | 0 | | 0 | 1 | 0 | 0 | 0 | | 0 |
| 37 | Jason Podollan‡ | RW | 4 | 0 | 0 | 0 | 0 | 0 | — | — | — | — | — | — |
| 29 | Felix Potvin‡ | G | 5 | 0 | 0 | 0 | | 0 | — | — | — | — | — | — |
| 35 | Jeff Reese† | G | 2 | 0 | 0 | 0 | | 0 | — | — | — | — | — | — |
| 21 | Adam Mair | C | — | — | — | — | — | — | 5 | 1 | 0 | 1 | −1 | 14 |

=== Goaltending ===
- † = Joined team via a transaction (e.g., trade, waivers, signing) during the season. Stats reflect time with the Maple Leafs only.
- ‡ = Left team via a transaction (e.g., trade, waivers, release) during the season. Stats reflect time with the Maple Leafs only.

| No. | Player | Regular season | | | | | | | | | | Playoffs | | | | | | | | |
| No. | Player | GP | W | L | T | SA | GA | GAA | SV% | SO | TOI | GP | W | L | SA | GA | GAA | SV% | SO | TOI |
|---|---|---|---|---|---|---|---|---|---|---|---|---|---|---|---|---|---|---|---|---|
| 31 | Curtis Joseph | 67 | 35 | 24 | 7 | 1903 | 171 | 2.56 | .910 | 3 | 4001 | 17 | 9 | 8 | 440 | 41 | 2.43 | .907 | 1 | 1011 |
| 30 | Glenn Healy | 9 | 6 | 3 | 0 | 257 | 27 | 2.97 | .895 | 0 | 546 | 1 | 0 | 0 | 5 | 0 | 0.00 | 1.000 | 0 | 20 |
| 29 | Felix Potvin‡ | 5 | 3 | 2 | 0 | 142 | 19 | 3.81 | .866 | 0 | 299 | — | — | — | — | — | — | — | — | — |
| 35 | Jeff Reese† | 2 | 1 | 1 | 0 | 51 | 8 | 4.53 | .843 | 0 | 106 | — | — | — | — | — | — | — | — | — |

== Awards and records ==
=== Awards ===
Curtis Joseph was a runner-up for the Lester B. Pearson Award and Vezina Trophy and Pat Quinn was a runner-up for the Jack Adams Award.

| Type | Award/honour | Recipient | Ref |
|---|---|---|---|
| League (in-season) | NHL All-Star Game selection | Curtis Joseph (Note: Joseph did not play and was replaced by Ron Tugnutt of the Ottawa Senators.) | |
| League (in-season) | NHL All-Star Game selection | Mats Sundin | |
| League (in-season) | NHL Player of the Week | Mats Sundin (October 26) | |
| League (in-season) | NHL Player of the Week | Sergei Berezin (April 5) | |
| Team | Molson Cup | Curtis Joseph | |

=== Milestones ===
| Milestone | Player | Date | Ref |
|---|---|---|---|
| First game | Tomas Kaberle | October 10, 1998 | |
| First game | Adam Mair | May 11, 1999 | |
| 500th game played | Curtis Joseph | February 10, 1999 | |

== Transactions ==
The Maple Leafs have been involved in the following transactions during the 1998-99 season.

=== Trades ===
| July 2, 1998 | To Calgary Flames David Cooper | To Toronto Maple Leafs Ladislav Kohn |
| October 14, 1998 | To New York Rangers Mathieu Schneider | To Toronto Maple Leafs Alexander Karpovtsev; 4th round pick in 1999 (Mirko Murovic) |
| January 9, 1999 | To New York Islanders Felix Potvin; 6th round pick in 1999 (Fedor Fedorov) | To Toronto Maple Leafs Bryan Berard; 6th round pick in 1999 (Jan Socher) |
| February 16, 1999 | To Vancouver Canucks Darby Hendrickson | To Toronto Maple Leafs Chris McAllister |
| February 17, 1999 | To Florida Panthers Jeff Ware | To Toronto Maple Leafs David Nemirovsky |
| March 23, 1999 | To Edmonton Oilers Jason Smith | To Toronto Maple Leafs 4th round pick in 1999 (Jonathan Zion); 2nd round pick in 2000 (Kris Vernarsky) |
| March 23, 1999 | To Los Angeles Kings Jason Podollan; 3rd round pick in 1999 (Cory Campbell) | To Toronto Maple Leafs Yanic Perreault |

=== Waivers ===
| October 5, 1998 | From St. Louis Blues Kevin Dahl |

=== Expansion draft ===
| June 25, 1999 | To Atlanta Thrashers Yannick Tremblay |

=== Free agents ===
| Player | Former team |
| Steve Thomas | New Jersey Devils |
| Dallas Eakins | Florida Panthers |
| Curtis Joseph | Edmonton Oilers |
| Niklas Andersson | San Jose Sharks |
| Garry Valk | Pittsburgh Penguins |
| Glen Featherstone | Chicago Wolves (IHL) |

| Player | New team |
| Kelly Fairchild | Dallas Stars |
| Mike Craig | San Jose Sharks |
| Marcel Cousineau | New York Islanders |
| Wendel Clark | Tampa Bay Lightning |
| Matt Martin | Dallas Stars |

== Draft picks ==
Toronto's draft picks at the 1998 NHL entry draft held at the Marine Midland Arena in Buffalo, New York.

| Round | # | Player | Nationality | College/Junior/Club team (League) |
|---|---|---|---|---|
| 1 | 10 | Nik Antropov | Kazakhstan | Torpedo Ust-Kamenogorsk (Kazakhstan) |
| 2 | 35 | Petr Svoboda | Czech Republic | BK Havlíčkův Brod (Czech Republic) |
| 3 | 69 | Jamie Hodson | Canada | Brandon Wheat Kings (WHL) |
| 4 | 87 | Alexei Ponikarovsky | Ukraine | Dynamo Moscow-2 (Russia) |
| 5 | 126 | Morgan Warren | Canada | Moncton Wildcats (QMJHL) |
| 6 | 154 | Allan Rourke | Canada | Kitchener Rangers (OHL) |
| 7 | 181 | Jonathan Gagnon | Canada | Cape Breton Screaming Eagles (QMJHL) |
| 8 | 215 | Dwight Wolfe | Canada | Halifax Mooseheads (QMJHL) |
| 8 | 228 | Michal Travnicek | Czech Republic | Chemopetrol Litvínov (Czech Republic) |
| 9 | 236 | Sergei Rostov | Russia | Dynamo Moscow-2 (Russia) |
