= Mike Maneluk =

Canadian ice hockey player

- Born: October 1, 1973 (age 52) Winnipeg, Manitoba, Canada
- Height: 6 ft 0 in (183 cm)
- Weight: 190 lb (86 kg; 13 st 8 lb)
- Position: Left wing
- Shot: Right
- Played for: Philadelphia Flyers; Chicago Blackhawks; New York Rangers; Columbus Blue Jackets; HC Lugano; EV Zug; EHC Basel; HC Davos; HC Dinamo Minsk; SC Langenthal; HC Ambrì-Piotta; Lausanne HC
- National team: Canada
- NHL draft: Undrafted
- Playing career: 1995–2010

Mike Maneluk
Medal record

Men's ice hockey

Representing Canada

World Championships
Bronze medal – third place	1995 Sweden	Ice hockey

Mike Maneluk (born October 1, 1973) is a Canadian former professional ice hockey left winger.

== Playing career ==
Maneluk played three seasons for the Brandon Wheat Kings of the Western Hockey League and one for the Canadian National Team before becoming a professional. He averaged nearly a point per game in the American Hockey League with the Baltimore Bandits, Worcester IceCats, and Philadelphia Phantoms over the course of his career. Maneluk won the Jack A. Butterfield Trophy as MVP of the 1998 Calder Cup Playoffs, and led the league in scoring in the 1999–2000 season.

He went to Switzerland for the 2001–02 season, playing with HC Lugano in the Swiss National League for four seasons. He then joined EV Zug, and played several seasons with the team. He played for EHC Basel in 2006-2007 and HC Davos in the 2007–08 season. After a stint with HC Dinamo Minsk of the Kontinental Hockey League, he finished his career in the Swiss B-League.

Maneluk played for Team Canada in the Spengler Cup (Davos) on 5 occasions as well as in the Men's World Championships. In 85 career NHL games, Maneluk scored eleven goals and added ten assists.

He retired from ice hockey in 2009 and he left Switzerland and returned to Canada. He now resides in Winnipeg, Manitoba.

== Career statistics ==
=== Regular season and playoffs ===
			Regular season					Playoffs
Season	Team	League	GP	G	A	Pts	PIM	GP	G	A	Pts	PIM
1990–91	St. Boniface Saints	MJHL	45	29	41	70	199	—	—	—	—	—
1991–92	Brandon Wheat Kings	WHL	68	23	30	53	102	—	—	—	—	—
1992–93	Brandon Wheat Kings	WHL	72	36	51	87	75	4	2	1	3	2
1993–94	Brandon Wheat Kings	WHL	63	50	47	97	112	1	0	0	0	0
1993–94	San Diego Gulls	IHL	—	—	—	—	—	1	0	0	0	0
1994–95	Canada	Intl	44	36	24	60	34	—	—	—	—	—
1994–95	San Diego Gulls	IHL	10	0	1	1	4	—	—	—	—	—
1995–96	Baltimore Bandits	AHL	74	33	38	71	73	6	4	3	7	14
1996–97	Worcester IceCats	AHL	70	27	27	54	89	5	1	2	3	14
1997–98	Worcester IceCats	AHL	5	3	3	6	4	—	—	—	—	—
1997–98	Philadelphia Phantoms	AHL	66	27	35	62	62	20	13	21	34	30
1998–99	Philadelphia Flyers	NHL	13	2	6	8	8	—	—	—	—	—
1998–99	Chicago Blackhawks	NHL	28	4	3	7	8	—	—	—	—	—
1998–99	New York Rangers	NHL	4	0	0	0	4	—	—	—	—	—
1999–2000	Philadelphia Phantoms	AHL	73	47	40	87	158	4	1	2	3	4
1999–2000	Philadelphia Flyers	NHL	1	0	0	0	4	—	—	—	—	—
2000–01	Chicago Wolves	IHL	10	2	2	4	11	—	—	—	—	—
2000–01	Columbus Blue Jackets	NHL	39	5	1	6	33	—	—	—	—	—
2001–02	HC Lugano	NLA	43	21	32	53	90	12	9	11	20	24
2002–03	HC Lugano	NLA	36	12	14	26	70	15	11	6	17	18
2003–04	HC Lugano	NLA	48	30	41	71	85	13	10	6	16	70
2004–05	HC Lugano	NLA	30	11	18	29	64	5	3	3	6	8
2005–06	EV Zug	NLA	43	16	21	37	46	7	1	1	2	14
2006–07	EV Zug	NLA	25	6	9	15	42	—	—	—	—	—
2006–07	EHC Basel	NLA	13	2	9	11	20	—	—	—	—	—
2007–08	EHC Basel	NLA	14	3	2	5	82	—	—	—	—	—
2007–08	HC Davos	NLA	19	8	8	16	16	6	2	1	3	14
2008–09	Dinamo Minsk	KHL	7	0	0	0	6	—	—	—	—	—
2008–09	HC Lugano	NLA	2	0	0	0	2	3	0	0	0	12
2008–09	SC Langenthal	SUI.2	34	13	21	34	56	4	5	1	6	4
2009–10	SC Langenthal	SUI.2	2	1	1	2	6	—	—	—	—	—
2009–10	HC Ambrì–Piotta	NLA	1	0	0	0	4	—	—	—	—	—
2009–10	Lausanne HC	NLB	5	2	4	6	4	—	—	—	—	—
AHL totals			288	137	143	280	386	35	19	28	47	62
NHL totals			85	11	10	21	57	—	—	—	—	—
NLA totals			274	109	154	263	521	61	36	28	64	168

=== International ===
Year	Team	Event	GP	G	A	Pts	PIM
1995	Canada	WC	8	0	2	2	0
Senior totals			8	0	2	2	0

Preceded by Mike McHugh	Winner of the Jack A. Butterfield Trophy; 1997–98	Succeeded by Peter Ferraro
