= 1998–99 Ottawa Senators season =

NHL hockey team season

1998–99 Ottawa Senators
- Northeast Division champions
- Division: 1st Northeast
- Conference: 2nd Eastern
- 1998–99 record: 44–23–15
- Home record: 22–11–8
- Road record: 22–12–7
- Goals for: 239
- Goals against: 179

Team information
- General manager: Rick Dudley
- Coach: Jacques Martin
- Captain: Alexei Yashin
- Alternate captains: Daniel Alfredsson; Wade Redden
- Arena: Corel Centre
- Average attendance: 17,219
- Minor league affiliate: Detroit Vipers

Team leaders
- Goals: Alexei Yashin (44)
- Assists: Alexei Yashin (50)
- Points: Alexei Yashin (94)
- Penalty minutes: Vaclav Prospal (58)
- Plus/minus: Magnus Arvedson (+33)
- Wins: Damian Rhodes and Ron Tugnutt (22)
- Goals against average: Ron Tugnutt (1.79)

The 1998–99 Ottawa Senators season was the seventh season of the Ottawa Senators of the National Hockey League (NHL). In this season the team cracked the 100 point barrier, as they finished with 103 points, and won the Northeast Division for the first time in club history.

Senators Head Coach Jacques Martin won the Jack Adams Trophy for the first time in his career and in Senators history, while Alexei Yashin, who was named team captain prior to the season, was a finalist for the Hart Memorial Trophy after his 94-point season. His 94 points obliterated the club record of 79, which Yashin himself set in the 1993–94 season.

Goaltenders Damian Rhodes and Ron Tugnutt split duties throughout the season, with each winning 22 games, sharing the team record for goaltender victories in a season, while Tugnutt's 1.79 goals against average (GAA) was an NHL low.

The Senators great regular season success did not continue to the playoffs, as the Buffalo Sabres, led by Dominik Hasek, swept the Senators out of the playoffs in four games, ending the Senators' season in the first round for the second time in three seasons.

== Regular season ==
Northeast Division teams

=== Final standings ===
Northeast Division
R	CR		GP	W	L	T	GF	GA	PIM	Pts
1	2	**Ottawa Senators**	82	44	23	15	239	179	892	103
2	4	**Toronto Maple Leafs**	82	45	30	7	268	231	1095	97
3	6	**Boston Bruins**	82	39	30	13	214	181	1182	91
4	7	**Buffalo Sabres**	82	37	28	17	207	175	1561	91
5	11	Montreal Canadiens	82	32	39	11	184	209	1299	75

Note: CR = Conference rank; GP = Games played; W = Wins; L = Losses; T = Ties; GF = Goals for; GA = Goals against; Pts = Points
Bolded teams qualified for the playoffs.

Eastern Conference
R		Div	GP	W	L	T	GF	GA	Pts
**1**	**y – New Jersey Devils**	**ATL**	**82**	**47**	**24**	**11**	**248**	**196**	**105**
**2**	**y – Ottawa Senators**	**NE**	**82**	**44**	**23**	**15**	**239**	**179**	**103**
**3**	**y – Carolina Hurricanes**	**SE**	**82**	**34**	**30**	**18**	**210**	**202**	**86**
**4**	**Toronto Maple Leafs**	**NE**	**82**	**45**	**30**	**7**	**268**	**231**	**97**
**5**	**Philadelphia Flyers**	**ATL**	**82**	**37**	**26**	**19**	**231**	**196**	**93**
**6**	**Boston Bruins**	**NE**	**82**	**39**	**30**	**13**	**214**	**181**	**91**
**7**	**Buffalo Sabres**	**NE**	**82**	**37**	**28**	**17**	**207**	**175**	**91**
**8**	**Pittsburgh Penguins**	**ATL**	**82**	**38**	**30**	**14**	**242**	**225**	**90**
9	Florida Panthers	SE	82	30	34	18	210	228	78
10	New York Rangers	ATL	82	33	38	11	217	227	77
11	Montreal Canadiens	NE	82	32	39	11	184	209	75
12	Washington Capitals	SE	82	31	45	6	200	218	68
13	New York Islanders	ATL	82	24	48	10	194	244	58
14	Tampa Bay Lightning	SE	82	19	54	9	179	292	47

Divisions: ATL – Atlantic Division, NE – Northeast Division, SE – Southeast Division

bold – Qualified for playoffs; y – Won division

== Playoffs ==
The Ottawa Senators ended the 1998–99 regular season as the Eastern Conference's second seed.

== Schedule and results ==
=== Regular season ===
1998–99 regular season
October: 5–3–0 (home: 3–2–0; road: 2–1–0)

Game	Date	Score	Opponent	Record	Attendance	Recap
1	October 10, 1998	4–3	@ Colorado Avalanche (1998–99)	1–0–0	16,061	W
2	October 11, 1998	4–1	@ Phoenix Coyotes (1998–99)	2–0–0	15,812	W
3	October 17, 1998	3–1	Nashville Predators (1998–99)	3–0–0	18,500	W
4	October 21, 1998	2–3	@ Montreal Canadiens (1998–99)	3–1–0	19,784	L
5	October 22, 1998	3–5	St. Louis Blues (1998–99)	3–2–0	14,293	L
6	October 24, 1998	1–3	Carolina Hurricanes (1998–99)	3–3–0	14,428	L
7	October 29, 1998	3–1	Philadelphia Flyers (1998–99)	4–3–0	15,738	W
8	October 31, 1998	5–1	Montreal Canadiens (1998–99)	5–3–0	17,653	W

November: 5–4–3 (home: 3–2–1; road: 2–2–2)

Game	Date	Score	Opponent	Record	Attendance	Recap
9	November 1, 1998	5–4	@ Philadelphia Flyers (1998–99)	6–3–0	19,442	W
10	November 5, 1998	2–4	Pittsburgh Penguins (1998–99)	6–4–0	13,686	L
11	November 7, 1998	5–8	Washington Capitals (1998–99)	6–5–0	15,221	L
12	November 10, 1998	2–2 OT	@ Buffalo Sabres (1998–99)	6–5–1	15,904	T
13	November 12, 1998	1–1 OT	Edmonton Oilers (1998–99)	6–5–2	14,680	T
14	November 14, 1998	1–2	@ Toronto Maple Leafs (1998–99)	6–6–2	15,726	L
15	November 15, 1998	2–2 OT	@ Chicago Blackhawks (1998–99)	6–6–3	15,906	T
16	November 20, 1998	4–1	@ Washington Capitals (1998–99)	7–6–3	19,740	W
17	November 21, 1998	4–1	Calgary Flames (1998–99)	8–6–3	17,154	W
18	November 23, 1998	4–3	Vancouver Canucks (1998–99)	9–6–3	15,330	W
19	November 26, 1998	4–1	New York Islanders (1998–99)	10–6–3	14,607	W
20	November 28, 1998	2–3 OT	@ Toronto Maple Leafs (1998–99)	10–7–3	15,726	L

December: 6–6–1 (home: 3–3–1; road: 3–3–0)

Game	Date	Score	Opponent	Record	Attendance	Recap
21	December 1, 1998	3–1	@ Nashville Predators (1998–99)	11–7–3	13,902	W
22	December 3, 1998	3–1	Los Angeles Kings (1998–99)	12–7–3	15,351	W
23	December 5, 1998	1–2	New York Rangers (1998–99)	12–8–3	18,500	L
24	December 8, 1998	4–2	@ Tampa Bay Lightning (1998–99)	13–8–3	10,587	W
25	December 9, 1998	5–6	@ Florida Panthers (1998–99)	13–9–3	16,994	L
26	December 12, 1998	0–2	Phoenix Coyotes (1998–99)	13–10–3	16,480	L
27	December 17, 1998	2–5	@ Boston Bruins (1998–99)	13–11–3	13,646	L
28	December 18, 1998	5–1	Carolina Hurricanes (1998–99)	14–11–3	15,124	W
29	December 20, 1998	2–3	Dallas Stars (1998–99)	14–12–3	17,581	L
30	December 23, 1998	3–1	Montreal Canadiens (1998–99)	15–12–3	18,500	W
31	December 26, 1998	1–2 OT	@ Pittsburgh Penguins (1998–99)	15–13–3	16,226	L
32	December 28, 1998	2–2 OT	Mighty Ducks of Anaheim (1998–99)	15–13–4	18,500	T
33	December 30, 1998	3–2 OT	@ Buffalo Sabres (1998–99)	16–13–4	18,595	W

January: 10–2–2 (home: 5–1–1; road: 5–1–1)

Game	Date	Score	Opponent	Record	Attendance	Recap
34	January 1, 1999	4–3	@ Washington Capitals (1998–99)	17–13–4	19,740	W
35	January 2, 1999	6–0	New Jersey Devils (1998–99)	18–13–4	18,037	W
36	January 4, 1999	4–4 OT	@ Carolina Hurricanes (1998–99)	18–13–5	5,655	T
37	January 6, 1999	2–0	@ Detroit Red Wings (1998–99)	19–13–5	19,983	W
38	January 8, 1999	5–1	Tampa Bay Lightning (1998–99)	20–13–5	16,174	W
39	January 10, 1999	4–1	Detroit Red Wings (1998–99)	21–13–5	18,500	W
40	January 11, 1999	4–2	@ New Jersey Devils (1998–99)	22–13–5	14,402	W
41	January 14, 1999	3–2	New Jersey Devils (1998–99)	23–13–5	18,037	W
42	January 16, 1999	1–1 OT	Buffalo Sabres (1998–99)	23–13–6	18,500	T
43	January 18, 1999	0–5	Philadelphia Flyers (1998–99)	23–14–6	17,858	L
44	January 19, 1999	2–1	@ New York Rangers (1998–99)	24–14–6	18,200	W
45	January 21, 1999	3–1	@ Boston Bruins (1998–99)	25–14–6	15,806	W
46	January 26, 1999	1–4	@ New Jersey Devils (1998–99)	25–15–6	15,891	L
47	January 30, 1999	9–2	New York Islanders (1998–99)	26–15–6	18,221	W

February: 7–3–2 (home: 5–1–1; road: 2–2–1)

Game	Date	Score	Opponent	Record	Attendance	Recap
48	February 1, 1999	1–0	@ Vancouver Canucks (1998–99)	27–15–6	16,019	W
49	February 3, 1999	2–2 OT	@ Edmonton Oilers (1998–99)	27–15–7	14,487	T
50	February 6, 1999	2–1	@ Calgary Flames (1998–99)	28–15–7	16,498	W
51	February 9, 1999	1–1 OT	Buffalo Sabres (1998–99)	28–15–8	17,079	T
52	February 11, 1999	1–3	Florida Panthers (1998–99)	28–16–8	16,355	L
53	February 13, 1999	2–1	Washington Capitals (1998–99)	29–16–8	18,500	W
54	February 15, 1999	6–2	Chicago Blackhawks (1998–99)	30–16–8	16,787	W
55	February 18, 1999	2–0	Boston Bruins (1998–99)	31–16–8	18,500	W
56	February 20, 1999	4–1	Philadelphia Flyers (1998–99)	32–16–8	18,500	W
57	February 23, 1999	2–5	@ Boston Bruins (1998–99)	32–17–8	14,336	L
58	February 25, 1999	3–1	Montreal Canadiens (1998–99)	33–17–8	18,500	W
59	February 27, 1999	1–4	@ Montreal Canadiens (1998–99)	33–18–8	21,273	L

March: 9–3–2 (home: 2–1–1; road: 7–2–1)

Game	Date	Score	Opponent	Record	Attendance	Recap
60	March 2, 1999	4–2	@ New York Islanders (1998–99)	34–18–8	9,283	W
61	March 4, 1999	5–0	@ Philadelphia Flyers (1998–99)	35–18–8	19,658	W
62	March 6, 1999	3–1	Toronto Maple Leafs (1998–99)	36–18–8	18,500	W
63	March 8, 1999	9–3	Tampa Bay Lightning (1998–99)	37–18–8	17,838	W
64	March 10, 1999	3–0	@ New York Rangers (1998–99)	38–18–8	18,200	W
65	March 13, 1999	2–3	@ San Jose Sharks (1998–99)	38–19–8	17,483	L
66	March 15, 1999	0–4	@ Los Angeles Kings (1998–99)	38–20–8	12,640	L
67	March 17, 1999	2–2 OT	@ Mighty Ducks of Anaheim (1998–99)	38–20–9	16,026	T
68	March 19, 1999	2–1	@ Dallas Stars (1998–99)	39–20–9	16,928	W
69	March 20, 1999	3–2	@ St. Louis Blues (1998–99)	40–20–9	19,736	W
70	March 24, 1999	0–3	Boston Bruins (1998–99)	40–21–9	18,500	L
71	March 26, 1999	1–1 OT	San Jose Sharks (1998–99)	40–21–10	18,283	T
72	March 27, 1999	7–3	@ New York Islanders (1998–99)	41–21–10	11,491	W
73	March 30, 1999	6–4	@ Pittsburgh Penguins (1998–99)	42–21–10	16,470	W

April: 2–2–5 (home: 1–1–3; road: 1–1–2)

Game	Date	Score	Opponent	Record	Attendance	Recap
74	April 1, 1999	3–3 OT	Pittsburgh Penguins (1998–99)	42–21–11	18,500	T
75	April 3, 1999	6–4	@ Florida Panthers (1998–99)	43–21–11	18,829	W
76	April 5, 1999	4–4 OT	@ Tampa Bay Lightning (1998–99)	43–21–12	11,326	T
77	April 7, 1999	2–4	@ Toronto Maple Leafs (1998–99)	43–22–12	18,800	L
78	April 8, 1999	3–1	Toronto Maple Leafs (1998–99)	44–22–12	18,500	W
79	April 10, 1999	1–1 OT	Buffalo Sabres (1998–99)	44–22–13	18,500	T
80	April 12, 1999	0–2	Florida Panthers (1998–99)	44–23–13	17,996	L
81	April 15, 1999	2–2 OT	New York Rangers (1998–99)	44–23–14	18,500	T
82	April 17, 1999	1–1 OT	@ Carolina Hurricanes (1998–99)	44–23–15	10,981	T

Legend: W Win (2 points) L Loss (0 points) T Tie (1 point)

=== Playoffs ===
1999 Stanley Cup playoffs
Eastern Conference Quarterfinals vs. (7) Buffalo Sabres – Sabres win 4–0

Game	Date	Score	Opponent	Series	Attendance	Recap
1	April 21, 1999	1–2	Buffalo Sabres	Sabres lead 1–0	18,500	L
2	April 23, 1999	2–3 2OT	Buffalo Sabres	Sabres lead 2–0	18,500	L
3	April 25, 1999	0–3	@ Buffalo Sabres	Sabres lead 3–0	18,595	L
4	April 27, 1999	3–4	@ Buffalo Sabres	Sabres win 4–0	18,595	L

Legend: W Win L Loss

== Player statistics ==
=== Scoring ===
- Position abbreviations: C = Centre; D = Defence; G = Goaltender; LW = Left wing; RW = Right wing
- † = Joined team via a transaction (e.g., trade, waivers, signing) during the season. Stats reflect time with the Senators only.
- ‡ = Left team via a transaction (e.g., trade, waivers, release) during the season. Stats reflect time with the Senators only.

No.	Player	Pos	Regular season						Playoffs					
No.	Player	Pos	GP	G	A	Pts	+/-	PIM	GP	G	A	Pts	+/-	PIM
19	Alexei Yashin	C	82	44	50	94	16	54	4	0	0	0	−4	10
15	Shawn McEachern	LW	77	31	25	56	8	46	4	2	0	2	1	6
10	Andreas Dackell	RW	77	15	35	50	9	30	4	0	1	1	−3	0
20	Magnus Arvedson	LW	80	21	26	47	33	50	3	0	1	1	−1	2
21	Andreas Johansson	C	69	21	16	37	1	34	2	0	0	0	−3	0
13	Vaclav Prospal	C	79	10	26	36	8	58	4	0	0	0	−2	0
33	Jason York	D	79	4	31	35	17	48	4	1	1	2	−1	4
11	Daniel Alfredsson	RW	58	11	22	33	8	14	4	1	2	3	−1	4
14	Radek Bonk	C	81	16	16	32	15	48	4	0	0	0	−1	6
18	Marian Hossa	RW	60	15	15	30	18	37	4	0	2	2	1	4
6	Wade Redden	D	72	8	21	29	7	54	4	1	2	3	−1	2
29	Igor Kravchuk	D	79	4	21	25	14	32	4	0	0	0	−5	0
5	Sami Salo	D	61	7	12	19	20	24	4	0	0	0	−3	0
22	Shaun Van Allen	C	79	6	11	17	3	30	4	0	0	0	−1	0
25	Bruce Gardiner	RW	59	4	8	12	6	43	3	0	0	0	0	4
27	Janne Laukkanen	D	50	1	11	12	18	40	4	0	0	0	1	4
3	Patrick Traverse	D	46	1	9	10	12	22	—	—	—	—	—	—
2	Lance Pitlick	D	50	3	6	9	7	33	2	0	0	0	−1	0
16	Steve Martins	C	36	4	3	7	4	10	—	—	—	—	—	—
12	David Oliver	RW	17	2	5	7	1	4	—	—	—	—	—	—
17	Chris Murray‡	RW	38	1	6	7	−2	65	—	—	—	—	—	—
4	Chris Phillips	D	34	3	3	6	−5	32	3	0	0	0	−1	0
28	Ted Donato†	LW	13	3	2	5	2	10	1	0	0	0	0	0
9	Bill Berg†	LW	44	2	2	4	4	28	2	0	0	0	0	0
7	Nelson Emerson†	RW	3	1	1	2	−1	2	4	1	3	4	0	0
1	Damian Rhodes	G	45	1	1	2		4	2	0	0	0		0
28	Steve Leach‡	RW	9	0	2	2	−1	6	—	—	—	—	—	—
24	Stanislav Neckar‡	D	3	0	2	2	−1	0	—	—	—	—	—	—
7	Vyacheslav Butsayev†	C	2	0	1	1	0	2	—	—	—	—	—	—
26	Phil Crowe	LW	8	0	1	1	1	4	—	—	—	—	—	—
24	John Gruden	D	13	0	1	1	0	8	—	—	—	—	—	—
37	Yves Sarault	LW	11	0	1	1	1	4	—	—	—	—	—	—
23	Radim Bicanek‡	D	7	0	0	0	−1	4	—	—	—	—	—	—
31	Ron Tugnutt	G	43	0	0	0		0	2	0	0	0		0

=== Goaltending ===
No.	Player	Regular season										Playoffs								
No.	Player	GP	W	L	T	SA	GA	GAA	SV%	SO	TOI	GP	W	L	SA	GA	GAA	SV%	SO	TOI
1	Damian Rhodes	45	22	13	7	1060	101	2.44	.905	3	2480	2	0	2	65	6	2.40	.908	0	150
31	Ron Tugnutt	43	22	10	8	1005	75	1.79	.925	3	2508	2	0	2	41	6	3.05	.854	0	118

== Awards and records ==
=== Awards ===
Type	Award/honour	Recipient	Ref
League (annual)	Jack Adams Award	Jacques Martin	
League (annual)	NHL All-Rookie Team	Marian Hossa (Forward)	
League (annual)	NHL All-Rookie Team	Sami Salo (Defence)	
League (annual)	NHL Second All-Star Team	Alexei Yashin (Centre)	
League (in-season)	NHL All-Star Game selection	Ron Tugnutt (Note: Tugnutt was an injury replacement for Curtis Joseph of the Toronto Maple Leafs.)	
League (in-season)	NHL All-Star Game selection	Alexei Yashin	
League (in-season)	NHL Player of the Week	Ron Tugnutt (January 11)	
League (in-season)	NHL Rookie of the Month	Marian Hossa (March)	
Team	Molson Cup	Alexei Yashin	

=== Milestones ===
Milestone	Player	Date	Ref
First game	Sami Salo	October 10, 1998	

== Transactions ==
=== Trades ===
June 27, 1998	To San Jose Sharks Ottawa's eighth-round pick 1999 entry draft	To Ottawa Senators San Jose's eighth-round pick 1998 entry draft (Sergei Verenikin)
August 21, 1998	To Chicago Blackhawks Justin Hocking	To Ottawa Senators Brian Felsner
November 27, 1998	To New York Rangers Stan Neckar	To Ottawa Senators Bill Berg; New York's second-round pick 1999 entry draft (Simon Lajeunesse)
March 8, 1999	To Florida Panthers Ottawa's sixth-round pick 1999 entry draft (later traded)	To Ottawa Senators Vyacheslav Butsayev
March 12, 1999	To Chicago Blackhawks Radim Bicanek	To Ottawa Senators Chicago's sixth-round pick 1999 entry draft (Martin Prusek)
March 19, 1999	To New York Islanders future considerations	To Ottawa Senators Chris Luongo
March 12, 1999	To Chicago Blackhawks Ottawa's fourth-round pick 1999 entry draft (Preston Mizzi)	To Ottawa Senators Ted Donato
March 23, 1999	To New York Islanders Chris Murray	To Ottawa Senators Nelson Emerson

=== Waivers ===
No waiver transactions.

=== Free agents ===
Player	Former team
David Oliver	Houston Aeros (IHL)
John Gruden	Detroit Vipers (IHL)
Steve Martins	Carolina Hurricanes
John Emmons	Michigan K-Wings (IHL)
Andreas Johansson	Pittsburgh Penguins
Steve Leach	Carolina Hurricanes
Brad Shaw	Detroit Vipers (IHL)
Andre Roy	Boston Bruins

Player	New team
Derek Armstrong	New York Rangers
Scott Ferguson	Mighty Ducks of Anaheim
Pat Falloon	Edmonton Oilers
Randy Cunneyworth	Buffalo Sabres
Sergei Zholtok	Montreal Canadiens
Steve Leach	Phoenix Coyotes

=== Expansion draft ===
June 26, 1998	To Nashville Predators Denny Lambert

Source: Ottawa Senators 2008–09 Media Guide. Ottawa Senators. 2008. p. 188.

== Draft picks ==
Ottawa's draft picks at the 1998 NHL entry draft in Buffalo, New York.

Round	#	Player	Nationality	College/Junior/Club team (League)
1	15	Mathieu Chouinard	Canada	Shawinigan Cataractes (QMJHL)
2	44	Mike Fisher	Canada	Sudbury Wolves (OHL)
2	58	Chris Bala	United States	Harvard University (NCAA)
3	74	Julien Vauclair	Switzerland	HC Lugano (Switzerland)
4	101	Petr Schastlivy	Russia	Yaroslavl Torpedo (Russia)
5	130	Gavin McLeod	Canada	Kelowna Rockets (WHL)
6	161	Chris Neil	Canada	North Bay Centennials (OHL)
7	188	Michel Periard	Canada	Shawinigan Cataractes (QMJHL)
8	223	Sergei Verenikin	Russia	Yaroslavl Torpedo (Russia)
9	246	Rastislav Pavlikovsky	Slovakia	Utah Grizzlies (IHL)

== Farm teams ==
=== Detroit Vipers ===
The Senators began a new affiliation with the Detroit Vipers of the International Hockey League for the 1998–99 season. The head coach of the club was Steve Ludzik.

The Vipers finished the season with the top record in the Northeast Division, as the club went 50–21–11, earning 111 points. In the post-season, the Vipers defeated the Indianapolis Ice before losing to the Orlando Solar Bears in the Turner Cup semi-finals.

Mike Prokopec led all Senators players with 25 goals and 53 points while John Gruden scored 10 goals and 35 points from the blueline. Jani Hurme had a 7–3–1 record with a 2.43 GAA and a .898 save percentage in 12 games. In the playoffs, Prokopec had nine points, as did John Emmons.

== See also ==
- 1998–99 NHL season
