= Ryan Bast =

Canadian ice hockey player

- Born: August 27, 1975 (age 49); Regina, Saskatchewan, Canada
- Height: 6 ft 3 in (191 cm)
- Weight: 215 lb (98 kg; 15 st 5 lb)
- Position: Defence
- Shot: Left
- Played for: Philadelphia Flyers
- NHL draft: Undrafted
- Playing career: 1996–2005

Ryan Bast (born August 27, 1975) is a Canadian former professional ice hockey defenceman. Undrafted, he played two games in the National Hockey League with the Philadelphia Flyers during the 1998–99 season. The rest of his career, which lasted from 1996 to 2005, was spent in the minor leagues. Bast concluded his 11-year professional career after his second year with the Alaska Aces of the ECHL in the 2004–05 season.

== Career statistics ==
=== Regular season and playoffs ===
			Regular season					Playoffs
Season	Team	League	GP	G	A	Pts	PIM	GP	G	A	Pts	PIM
1993–94	Portland Winter Hawks	WHL	6	0	0	0	4	—	—	—	—	—
1994–95	Prince Albert Raiders	WHL	47	2	8	10	139	—	—	—	—	—
1995–96	Prince Albert Raiders	WHL	42	1	10	11	149	14	0	3	3	13—
1995–96	Calgary Hitmen	WHL	3	0	0	0	24	—	—	—	—	—
1995–96	Swift Current Broncos	WHL	25	2	3	5	50	6	1	0	1	21
1996–97	Toledo Storm	ECHL	12	2	2	4	75	—	—	—	—	—
1996–97	Las Vegas Thunder	IHL	49	2	3	5	266	—	—	—	—	—
1996–97	Saint John Flames	AHL	12	0	0	0	21	5	0	0	0	4
1997–98	Saint John Flames	AHL	77	3	8	11	187	21	0	1	1	55
1998–99	Philadelphia Flyers	NHL	2	0	1	1	0	—	—	—	—	—
1998–99	Saint John Flames	AHL	2	0	0	0	5	—	—	—	—	—
1998–99	Philadelphia Phantoms	AHL	69	0	11	11	160	16	0	0	0	30
1999–00	Philadelphia Phantoms	AHL	71	1	9	10	198	5	0	0	0	6
2000–01	Hartford Wolf Pack	AHL	50	1	1	2	146	—	—	—	—	—
2001–02	Pee Dee Pride	ECHL	16	0	4	4	32	—	—	—	—	—
2001–02	Lowell Lock Monsters	AHL	59	1	7	8	88	5	0	1	1	4
2002–03	Lowell Lock Monsters	AHL	45	1	0	1	68	—	—	—	—	—
2002–03	Philadelphia Phantoms	AHL	11	0	1	1	21	—	—	—	—	—
2002–03	Hartford Wolf Pack	AHL	18	0	3	3	18	2	0	0	0	2
2003–04	Alaska Aces	ECHL	72	2	18	20	127	7	0	1	1	5
2004–05	Alaska Aces	ECHL	72	5	14	19	118	15	1	2	3	12
2006–07	Stony Plain Eagles	ChHL	17	0	15	15	50	—	—	—	—	—
2007–08	Stony Plain Eagles	ChHL	8	3	2	5	2	—	—	—	—	—
2008–09	Stony Plain Eagles	ChHL	7	1	5	6	18	—	—	—	—	—
2010–11	Stony Plain Eagles	ChHL	3	0	0	0	0	—	—	—	—	—
2016–17	Stony Plain Eagles	ChHL	2	0	0	0	0	—	—	—	—	—
AHL totals			414	7	40	47	912	54	0	2	2	101
NHL totals			2	0	1	1	0	—	—	—	—	—

== Awards and honours ==
Award	Year
AHL
Second All-Star Team	1998
