= 1998–99 Buffalo Sabres season =

NHL hockey team season

1998–99 Buffalo Sabres
- Eastern Conference champions
- Division: 4th Northeast
- Conference: 7th Eastern
- 1998–99 record: 37–28–17
- Home record: 23–12–6
- Road record: 14–16–11
- Goals for: 207
- Goals against: 175

Team information
- General manager: Darcy Regier
- Coach: Lindy Ruff
- Captain: Michael Peca
- Alternate captains: Jay McKee; Darryl Shannon
- Arena: Marine Midland Arena
- Average attendance: 17,982
- Minor league affiliates: Rochester Americans; South Carolina Stingrays; B.C. Icemen

Team leaders
- Goals: Miroslav Satan (40)
- Assists: Jason Woolley (33)
- Points: Miroslav Satan (66)
- Penalty minutes: Rob Ray (261)
- Plus/minus: Darryl Shannon (+28)
- Wins: Dominik Hasek (30)
- Goals against average: Dominik Hasek (1.87)

The 1998–99 Buffalo Sabres season was the Sabres' 29th season in the National Hockey League (NHL). Miroslav Satan scored 40 goals and the Sabres would add influential centers Stu Barnes and Joe Juneau from the Pittsburgh Penguins and Washington Capitals, respectively. Michal Grosek had the best season of his career, and the team finally returned to the Stanley Cup Final, which was a losing effort against the Dallas Stars.

== Off-season ==
In the 1998 NHL entry draft, the Sabres picked Dmitri Kalinin with their first-round pick, 18th overall.

== Regular season ==
=== Season standings ===
Northeast Division
R	CR		GP	W	L	T	GF	GA	PIM	Pts
1	2	**Ottawa Senators**	82	44	23	15	239	179	892	103
2	4	**Toronto Maple Leafs**	82	45	30	7	268	231	1095	97
3	6	**Boston Bruins**	82	39	30	13	214	181	1182	91
4	7	**Buffalo Sabres**	82	37	28	17	207	175	1561	91
5	11	Montreal Canadiens	82	32	39	11	184	209	1299	75

Note: CR = Conference rank; GP = Games played; W = Wins; L = Losses; T = Ties; GF = Goals for; GA = Goals against; Pts = Points
Bolded teams qualified for the playoffs.

Eastern Conference
R		Div	GP	W	L	T	GF	GA	Pts
**1**	**y – New Jersey Devils**	**ATL**	**82**	**47**	**24**	**11**	**248**	**196**	**105**
**2**	**y – Ottawa Senators**	**NE**	**82**	**44**	**23**	**15**	**239**	**179**	**103**
**3**	**y – Carolina Hurricanes**	**SE**	**82**	**34**	**30**	**18**	**210**	**202**	**86**
**4**	**Toronto Maple Leafs**	**NE**	**82**	**45**	**30**	**7**	**268**	**231**	**97**
**5**	**Philadelphia Flyers**	**ATL**	**82**	**37**	**26**	**19**	**231**	**196**	**93**
**6**	**Boston Bruins**	**NE**	**82**	**39**	**30**	**13**	**214**	**181**	**91**
**7**	**Buffalo Sabres**	**NE**	**82**	**37**	**28**	**17**	**207**	**175**	**91**
**8**	**Pittsburgh Penguins**	**ATL**	**82**	**38**	**30**	**14**	**242**	**225**	**90**
9	Florida Panthers	SE	82	30	34	18	210	228	78
10	New York Rangers	ATL	82	33	38	11	217	227	77
11	Montreal Canadiens	NE	82	32	39	11	184	209	75
12	Washington Capitals	SE	82	31	45	6	200	218	68
13	New York Islanders	ATL	82	24	48	10	194	244	58
14	Tampa Bay Lightning	SE	82	19	54	9	179	292	47

Divisions: ATL – Atlantic Division, NE – Northeast Division, SE – Southeast Division

bold – Qualified for playoffs; y – Won division

== Playoffs ==
=== Eastern Conference Finals ===
The Toronto Maple Leafs and Buffalo Sabres met in the 1999 Eastern Conference Finals. The Maple Leafs were coming off a six-game series win over the Pittsburgh Penguins, while the Sabres were coming off a six-game series win themselves, over the Boston Bruins. Toronto was having its best playoff since 1994, when they last made a conference final series. Buffalo, on the other hand, was in the third round for the second consecutive year.

In Game 1, Dwayne Roloson filled in for injured Sabres goaltender Dominik Hasek at the Air Canada Centre in Toronto. Leading 3–2 midway through the game, Toronto appeared to be in control, but Stu Barnes tied the game for Buffalo at 14:37 of the second period. The Sabres went on to score twice in the third period, on goals by Curtis Brown at 5:21 and Geoff Sanderson at 11:02. Steve Thomas' goal with 6:01 remaining in the game brought Toronto to within one, but Buffalo held on to win 5–4. Roloson impressed the critics, stopping 28 of 32 shots.

In Game 2, the Maple Leafs scored two goals 18 seconds apart in the first period, as Steve Sullivan scored at 10:28 followed by Sylvain Cote at 10:46. With just over ten minutes to go in the game, Toronto held a 4–3 lead with Buffalo pressing. Steve Thomas' goal at with 7:43 to go gave the Maple Leafs a 5–3 lead and Garry Valk sealed the 6–3 win with an empty-net goal at 19:30.

With series tied at 1–1, the two teams traveled south to the Marine Midland Arena in Buffalo for Games 3 and 4. Dominik Hasek returned for the Sabres in game three, but it was the away team that netted the first goal, as Maple Leafs forward Yanic Perreault scored at 16:08 of the first period. But Buffalo was not to be denied, and they scored three goals in the first 7:38 of the second period. Alexander Karpovtsev scored at 13:09 of the second to pull the Maple Leafs to within one, but they could not score the equalizer and Curtis Brown iced the game with an empty-net goal at 19:31 of the third period and the Sabres won, 4–2. Dominik Hasek made 24 saves in the victory.

Buffalo came out flying again in Game 4, holding a 5–0 lead after two periods. Hasek's shutout bid was erased when Mats Sundin scored on a penalty shot at 6:59. He scored again with 1:57 remaining in the game as Buffalo won, 5–2. This time, Hasek made 31 saves.

In game five at the Air Canada Centre on May 31, the Sabres looked to advance to the Stanley Cup Final for the first time since 1975. After a scoreless first period, Steve Sullivan got Toronto on the board first just 33 seconds into the second. After goals by Curtis Brown, Kris King and Vaclav Varada, the game was tied 2–2 after two periods. Erik Rasmussen broke the tie with a goal at 11:35 of the third period. With less than two minutes remaining, the Maple Leafs got a power play and pulled Joseph to get a six-on-four situation, but could not score on Hasek. Dixon Ward added a shorthanded empty-net goal with 1:02 remaining as the Sabres went on to win 4–2 and take the series four games to one. With the victory, they advanced to the Stanley Cup Final for the first time since 1975.

=== Stanley Cup Final ===
==== "No Goal!" ====
In game six, Dallas Stars winger Brett Hull's triple-overtime goal — as Hull's skate was visibly in Dominik Hasek's crease — ended the series, and the Stars were awarded the Cup. In 1999, it was illegal to score a goal if an offensive player's skate entered the crease before the puck did. At the time, even Dallas Morning News hockey writer Keith Gave questioned the legality of the goal. NHL officials, however, maintained that Hull's two shots in the goal mouth constituted a single possession of the puck since the puck deflected off Hasek, and their ruling stood, citing that they "were going to change the rule the following year anyway." It is widely speculated that, by the time the Sabres mentioned the foul, the red carpet had already been unrolled at center ice, and the officials refused to acknowledge the non-call, also due to NHL Commissioner Gary Bettman's desires to see a team "South of the Mason–Dixon line" hoist the Stanley Cup. ESPN has ranked the call as the fifth worst officiating call in sports history. Conversely, Al Strachan of the Toronto Sun wrote, "There should have been no controversy whatsoever. When Hull first kicked the rebound on to his stick, he had neither foot in the crease. At the instant he kicked the puck, he became in control of it. It was only in the follow-through of that kick that his left foot moved into the crease." Buffalo sports fans, who have suffered through some of the biggest misfortunes in sports history (such as "Wide Right" and "Music City Miracle"), refer to the game as "No Goal," a phrase still used in western New York to this day, even having bumper stickers saying the phrase. The rule was changed for the following season, allowing players to be inside the goaltender's crease as long as they do not interfere with the goalie.

== Schedule and results ==
=== Regular season ===
1998–99 regular season
October: 4–3–2 (home: 1–1–1; road: 3–2–1)

Game	Date	Score	Opponent	Record	Recap
1	October 10, 1998	1–4	@ Dallas Stars (1998–99)	0–1–0	L
2	October 12, 1998	3–0	@ Colorado Avalanche (1998–99)	1–1–0	W
3	October 16, 1998	2–2 OT	Florida Panthers (1998–99)	1–1–1	T
4	October 17, 1998	4–3	@ Montreal Canadiens (1998–99)	2–1–1	W
5	October 23, 1998	0–1	Washington Capitals (1998–99)	2–2–1	L
6	October 24, 1998	4–5	@ New York Islanders (1998–99)	2–3–1	L
7	October 27, 1998	0–0 OT	@ New York Rangers (1998–99)	2–3–2	T
8	October 30, 1998	4–1	Toronto Maple Leafs (1998–99)	3–3–2	W
9	October 31, 1998	6–3	@ Toronto Maple Leafs (1998–99)	4–3–2	W

November: 6–2–2 (home: 4–0–1; road: 2–2–1)

Game	Date	Score	Opponent	Record	Recap
10	November 3, 1998	4–2	Boston Bruins (1998–99)	5–3–2	W
11	November 7, 1998	2–2 OT	@ Philadelphia Flyers (1998–99)	5–3–3	T
12	November 10, 1998	2–2 OT	Ottawa Senators (1998–99)	5–3–4	T
13	November 12, 1998	2–0	@ Washington Capitals (1998–99)	6–3–4	W
14	November 14, 1998	6–1	Chicago Blackhawks (1998–99)	7–3–4	W
15	November 20, 1998	4–1	Toronto Maple Leafs (1998–99)	8–3–4	W
16	November 21, 1998	1–2	@ Toronto Maple Leafs (1998–99)	8–4–4	L
17	November 25, 1998	4–2	New York Rangers (1998–99)	9–4–4	W
18	November 28, 1998	2–6	@ Florida Panthers (1998–99)	9–5–4	L
19	November 29, 1998	6–3	@ Tampa Bay Lightning (1998–99)	10–5–4	W

December: 9–3–1 (home: 5–3–0; road: 4–0–1)

Game	Date	Score	Opponent	Record	Recap
20	December 2, 1998	2–1	Florida Panthers (1998–99)	11–5–4	W
21	December 4, 1998	3–0	Philadelphia Flyers (1998–99)	12–5–4	W
22	December 5, 1998	3–1	@ Nashville Predators (1998–99)	13–5–4	W
23	December 8, 1998	2–2 OT	@ St. Louis Blues (1998–99)	13–5–5	T
24	December 11, 1998	2–0	New York Rangers (1998–99)	14–5–5	W
25	December 12, 1998	4–1	@ Boston Bruins (1998–99)	15–5–5	W
26	December 18, 1998	4–2	Montreal Canadiens (1998–99)	16–5–5	W
27	December 19, 1998	2–3	Carolina Hurricanes (1998–99)	16–6–5	L
28	December 21, 1998	4–1	@ Carolina Hurricanes (1998–99)	17–6–5	W
29	December 23, 1998	2–0	Tampa Bay Lightning (1998–99)	18–6–5	W
30	December 26, 1998	2–0	@ New Jersey Devils (1998–99)	19–6–5	W
31	December 28, 1998	4–7	New Jersey Devils (1998–99)	19–7–5	L
32	December 30, 1998	2–3 OT	Ottawa Senators (1998–99)	19–8–5	L

January: 5–6–3 (home: 3–3–1; road: 2–3–2)

Game	Date	Score	Opponent	Record	Recap
33	January 1, 1999	2–7	Mighty Ducks of Anaheim (1998–99)	19–9–5	L
34	January 2, 1999	7–1	Calgary Flames (1998–99)	20–9–5	W
35	January 6, 1999	3–2 OT	@ Mighty Ducks of Anaheim (1998–99)	21–9–5	W
36	January 7, 1999	2–4	@ Los Angeles Kings (1998–99)	21–10–5	L
37	January 9, 1999	2–2 OT	@ San Jose Sharks (1998–99)	21–10–6	T
38	January 11, 1999	0–1	@ Phoenix Coyotes (1998–99)	21–11–6	L
39	January 13, 1999	2–4	St. Louis Blues (1998–99)	21–12–6	L
40	January 15, 1999	2–1	Boston Bruins (1998–99)	22–12–6	W
41	January 16, 1999	1–1 OT	@ Ottawa Senators (1998–99)	22–12–7	T
42	January 18, 1999	4–0	@ Florida Panthers (1998–99)	23–12–7	W
43	January 19, 1999	1–2	@ Tampa Bay Lightning (1998–99)	23–13–7	L
44	January 26, 1999	1–1 OT	Phoenix Coyotes (1998–99)	23–13–8	T
45	January 28, 1999	2–4	Nashville Predators (1998–99)	23–14–8	L
46	January 30, 1999	4–1	Los Angeles Kings (1998–99)	24–14–8	W

February: 4–6–4 (home: 3–2–2; road: 1–4–2)

Game	Date	Score	Opponent	Record	Recap
47	February 2, 1999	3–5	@ Pittsburgh Penguins (1998–99)	24–15–8	L
48	February 3, 1999	3–5	Colorado Avalanche (1998–99)	24–16–8	L
49	February 6, 1999	2–3	@ Montreal Canadiens (1998–99)	24–17–8	L
50	February 7, 1999	1–3	@ Washington Capitals (1998–99)	24–18–8	L
51	February 9, 1999	1–1 OT	@ Ottawa Senators (1998–99)	24–18–9	T
52	February 11, 1999	5–2	Montreal Canadiens (1998–99)	25–18–9	W
53	February 13, 1999	2–2 OT	New York Islanders (1998–99)	25–18–10	T
54	February 15, 1999	3–2	Carolina Hurricanes (1998–99)	26–18–10	W
55	February 17, 1999	2–3 OT	Toronto Maple Leafs (1998–99)	26–19–10	L
56	February 19, 1999	4–2	San Jose Sharks (1998–99)	27–19–10	W
57	February 21, 1999	4–4 OT	Detroit Red Wings (1998–99)	27–19–11	T
58	February 24, 1999	2–2 OT	@ Calgary Flames (1998–99)	27–19–12	T
59	February 26, 1999	3–6	@ Edmonton Oilers (1998–99)	27–20–12	L
60	February 28, 1999	2–0	@ Vancouver Canucks (1998–99)	28–20–12	W

March: 5–5–3 (home: 4–2–1; road: 1–3–2)

Game	Date	Score	Opponent	Record	Recap
61	March 3, 1999	3–5	Edmonton Oilers (1998–99)	28–21–12	L
62	March 5, 1999	2–1	Dallas Stars (1998–99)	29–21–12	W
63	March 7, 1999	1–1 OT	Philadelphia Flyers (1998–99)	29–21–13	T
64	March 8, 1999	1–4	@ Carolina Hurricanes (1998–99)	29–22–13	L
65	March 11, 1999	2–5	Tampa Bay Lightning (1998–99)	29–23–13	L
66	March 13, 1999	3–1	Boston Bruins (1998–99)	30–23–13	W
67	March 15, 1999	2–1	New York Islanders (1998–99)	31–23–13	W
68	March 19, 1999	3–2 OT	@ New York Rangers (1998–99)	32–23–13	W
69	March 23, 1999	1–1 OT	@ New Jersey Devils (1998–99)	32–23–14	T
70	March 24, 1999	1–2	@ Detroit Red Wings (1998–99)	32–24–14	L
71	March 27, 1999	1–1 OT	@ Pittsburgh Penguins (1998–99)	32–24–15	T
72	March 28, 1999	4–3 OT	Pittsburgh Penguins (1998–99)	33–24–15	W
73	March 31, 1999	1–2	@ Chicago Blackhawks (1998–99)	33–25–15	L

April: 4–3–2 (home: 3–1–0; road: 1–2–2)

Game	Date	Score	Opponent	Record	Recap
74	April 3, 1999	1–2	@ Montreal Canadiens (1998–99)	33–26–15	L
75	April 5, 1999	3–1	Pittsburgh Penguins (1998–99)	34–26–15	W
76	April 6, 1999	4–3	@ New York Islanders (1998–99)	35–26–15	W
77	April 9, 1999	3–1	Florida Panthers (1998–99)	36–26–15	W
78	April 10, 1999	1–1 OT	@ Ottawa Senators (1998–99)	36–26–16	T
79	April 13, 1999	2–2 OT	@ Philadelphia Flyers (1998–99)	36–26–17	T
80	April 14, 1999	1–2	New Jersey Devils (1998–99)	36–27–17	L
81	April 17, 1999	1–2 OT	@ Boston Bruins (1998–99)	36–28–17	L
82	April 18, 1999	3–0	Washington Capitals (1998–99)	37–28–17	W

Legend: W Win (2 points) L Loss (0 points) T Tie (1 point)

=== Playoffs ===
1999 Stanley Cup playoffs
Eastern Conference Quarterfinals vs. (2) Ottawa Senators – Sabres win 4–0

Game	Date	Score	Opponent	Series	Recap
1	April 21, 1999	2–1	@ Ottawa Senators	Sabres lead 1–0	W
2	April 23, 1999	3–2 2OT	@ Ottawa Senators	Sabres lead 2–0	W
3	April 25, 1999	3–0	Ottawa Senators	Sabres lead 3–0	W
4	April 27, 1999	4–3	Ottawa Senators	Sabres win 4–0	W

Eastern Conference Semifinals vs. (6) Boston Bruins – Sabres win 4–2

Game	Date	Score	Opponent	Series	Recap
1	May 6, 1999	2–4	@ Boston Bruins	Bruins lead 1–0	L
2	May 9, 1999	3–1	@ Boston Bruins	Series tied 1–1	W
3	May 12, 1999	3–2	Boston Bruins	Sabres lead 2–1	W
4	May 14, 1999	3–0	Boston Bruins	Sabres lead 3–1	W
5	May 16, 1999	3–5	@ Boston Bruins	Sabres lead 3–2	L
6	May 18, 1999	3–2	Boston Bruins	Sabres win 4–2	W

Eastern Conference Finals vs. (4) Toronto Maple Leafs – Sabres win 4–1

Game	Date	Score	Opponent	Series	Recap
1	May 23, 1999	5–4	@ Toronto Maple Leafs	Sabres lead 1–0	W
2	May 25, 1999	3–6	@ Toronto Maple Leafs	Series tied 1–1	L
3	May 27, 1999	4–2	Toronto Maple Leafs	Sabres lead 2–1	W
4	May 29, 1999	5–2	Toronto Maple Leafs	Sabres lead 3–1	W
5	May 31, 1999	4–2	@ Toronto Maple Leafs	Sabres win 4–1	W

Stanley Cup Finals vs. (W1) Dallas Stars – Stars win 4–2

Game	Date	Score	Opponent	Series	Recap
1	June 8, 1999	3–2 OT	@ Dallas Stars	Sabres lead 1–0	W
2	June 10, 1999	2–4	@ Dallas Stars	Series tied 1–1	L
3	June 12, 1999	1–2	Dallas Stars	Stars lead 2–1	L
4	June 15, 1999	2–1	Dallas Stars	Series tied 2–2	W
5	June 17, 1999	0–2	@ Dallas Stars	Stars lead 3–2	L
6	June 19, 1999	1–2 3OT	Dallas Stars	Stars win 4–2	L

Legend: W Win L Loss

== Player statistics ==
=== Scoring ===
- Position abbreviations: C = Center; D = Defense; G = Goaltender; LW = Left wing; RW = Right wing
- † = Joined team via a transaction (e.g., trade, waivers, signing) during the season. Stats reflect time with the Sabres only.
- ‡ = Left team via a transaction (e.g., trade, waivers, release) during the season. Stats reflect time with the Sabres only.

No.	Player	Pos	Regular season						Playoffs					
No.	Player	Pos	GP	G	A	Pts	+/-	PIM	GP	G	A	Pts	+/-	PIM
81	Miroslav Satan	LW	81	40	26	66	24	44	12	3	5	8	3	2
27	Michael Peca	C	82	27	29	56	7	81	21	5	8	13	1	18
18	Michal Grosek	LW	76	20	30	50	21	102	13	0	4	4	1	28
37	Curtis Brown	C	78	16	31	47	23	56	21	7	6	13	3	10
15 (Note: Ward wore number 17 in his first game.)	Dixon Ward	RW	78	20	24	44	10	44	21	7	5	12	6	32
5	Jason Woolley	D	80	10	33	43	16	62	21	4	11	15	0	10
19	Brian Holzinger	C	81	17	17	34	2	45	21	3	5	8	1	33
44	Alexei Zhitnik	D	81	7	26	33	−6	96	21	4	11	15	−6	52
25	Vaclav Varada	RW	72	7	24	31	11	61	21	5	4	9	2	14
80	Geoff Sanderson	LW	75	12	18	30	8	22	19	4	6	10	5	14
36	Matthew Barnaby‡	RW	44	4	14	18	−2	143	—	—	—	—	—	—
26	Derek Plante‡	C	41	4	11	15	3	12	—	—	—	—	—	—
8	Darryl Shannon	D	71	3	12	15	28	52	2	0	0	0	−1	0
42	Richard Smehlik	D	72	3	11	14	-9	44	21	0	3	3	−4	10
22	Wayne Primeau	C	67	5	8	13	−6	38	19	3	4	7	0	6
9	Erik Rasmussen	C	42	3	7	10	6	37	21	2	4	6	2	18
3	James Patrick	D	45	1	7	8	12	16	20	0	1	1	6	12
74	Jay McKee	D	72	0	6	6	20	75	21	0	3	3	13	24
17	Randy Cunneyworth	LW	14	2	2	4	1	0	3	0	0	0	−1	0
41	Stu Barnes†	C	17	0	4	4	1	10	21	7	3	10	−1	6
32	Rob Ray	RW	76	0	4	4	−2	261	5	1	0	1	1	0
24	Paul Kruse	LW	43	3	0	3	0	114	10	0	0	0	0	4
4	Mike Wilson‡	D	30	1	2	3	10	47	—	—	—	—	—	—
90	Joe Juneau†	C	9	1	1	2	−1	2	20	3	8	11	−2	10
4	Rhett Warrener†	D	13	1	0	1	3	20	20	1	3	4	12	32
34	Jean-Luc Grand-Pierre	D	16	0	1	1	0	17	—	—	—	—	—	—
43	Martin Biron	G	6	0	0	0		0	—	—	—	—	—	—
39	Dominik Hasek	G	64	0	0	0		14	19	0	1	1		8
29	Jason Holland	D	3	0	0	0	−1	8	—	—	—	—	—	—
21	Mike Hurlbut	D	1	0	0	0	2	0	—	—	—	—	—	—
40	Rumun Ndur‡	D	8	0	0	0	1	16	—	—	—	—	—	—
83	Domenic Pittis	C	3	0	0	0	0	2	—	—	—	—	—	—
30	Dwayne Roloson	G	18	0	0	0		4	4	0	0	0		0
6	Cory Sarich	D	4	0	0	0	3	0	—	—	—	—	—	—
46	Dean Sylvester	RW	1	0	0	0	−1	0	4	0	0	0	−1	2

=== Goaltending ===
No.	Player	Regular season										Playoffs								
No.	Player	GP	W	L	T	SA	GA	GAA	SV%	SO	TOI	GP	W	L	SA	GA	GAA	SV%	SO	TOI
39	Dominik Hasek	64	30	18	14	1877	119	1.87	.937	9	3816:43	19	13	6	587	36	1.77	.939	2	1217:08
30	Dwayne Roloson	18	6	8	2	460	42	2.77	.909	1	910:49	4	1	1	67	10	4.31	.851	0	139:20
43	Martin Biron	6	1	2	1	120	10	2.14	.917	0	280:40	—	—	—	—	—	—	—	—	—

== Awards and records ==
=== Awards ===
Dominik Hasek was also a nominee for the Hart Memorial Trophy and Lester B. Pearson Trophy.

Type	Award/honor	Recipient	Ref
League (annual)	King Clancy Memorial Trophy	Rob Ray	
League (annual)	NHL First All-Star Team	Dominik Hasek (Goaltender)	
League (annual)	Vezina Trophy	Dominik Hasek	
League (in-season)	NHL All-Star Game selection	Dominik Hasek (Note: Hasek was voted to the starting lineup, earning more votes than any other player.)	
League (in-season)	NHL All-Star Game selection	Lindy Ruff (coach)	
League (in-season)	NHL All-Star Game selection	Alexei Zhitnik	
League (in-season)	NHL Player of the Month	Dominik Hasek (December)	
League (in-season)	NHL Player of the Week	Dominik Hasek (December 7)	
League (in-season)	NHL Player of the Week	Dominik Hasek (December 14)	
League (in-season)	NHL Player of the Week	Miroslav Satan (February 22)	
League (in-season)	NHL Player of the Week	Miroslav Satan (March 22)	
League (in-season)	NHL Player of the Week	Dominik Hasek (April 12)	

=== Milestones ===
Milestone	Player	Date	Ref
First game	Cory Sarich	February 9, 1999	
First game	Jean-Luc Grand-Pierre	February 19, 1999	
First game	Dean Sylvester	April 14, 1999	

== Transactions ==
- On March 11, 1999, the Sabres traded Matthew Barnaby to the Pittsburgh Penguins for Stu Barnes.
- On March 13, 1999, the Sabres traded Derek Plante to the Dallas Stars for a 1999 2nd round pick in the upcoming NHL Draft.
- Also on March 13, 1999, the Sabres acquired Joe Juneau and a 1999 3rd round pick in the upcoming NHL Draft, in exchange for Alexei Tezikov and a 2000 4th round pick in the NHL Draft.
- On March 23, 1999, the Sabres traded Mike Wilson to the Florida Panthers for Rhett Warrener and a 1999 5th round pick in the upcoming NHL Draft.

== Draft picks ==
Buffalo's draft picks at the 1998 NHL entry draft held at the Marine Midland Arena in Buffalo, New York.

Round	#	Player	Nationality	College/Junior/Club team
1	18	Dmitri Kalinin (D)	Russia	Traktor Chelyabinsk (Russia)
2	34	Andrew Peters (LW)	Canada	Oshawa Generals (OHL)
2	47	Norm Milley (RW)	Canada	Sudbury Wolves (OHL)
2	50	Jaroslav Kristek (RW)	Czech Republic	HC Zlín (Extraliga)
3	77	Mike Pandolfo (RW)	United States	Saint Sebastian's School (USHS-MA)
5	137	Aaron Goldade (LW)	Canada	Brandon Wheat Kings (WHL)
6	164	Ales Kotalik (RW)	Czech Republic	HC České Budějovice (Czech Republic)
7	191	Brad Moran (LW)	Canada	Calgary Hitmen (WHL)
8	218	David Moravec (LW)	Czech Republic	HC Vítkovice (Czech Republic)
9	249	Edo Terglav (RW)	Slovenia	Baie-Comeau Drakkar (QMJHL)
