= 1998–99 NHL season =

National Hockey League season

- League: National Hockey League
- Sport: Ice hockey
- Duration: October 9, 1998 – June 19, 1999
- Games: 82
- Teams: 27
- TV partner(s): CBC, CTV Sportsnet, SRC (Canada); ESPN, Fox (United States)

Draft
- Top draft pick: Vincent Lecavalier
- Picked by: Tampa Bay Lightning

Regular season
- Presidents' Trophy: Dallas Stars
- Season MVP: Jaromir Jagr (Penguins)
- Top scorer: Jaromir Jagr (Penguins)

Playoffs
- Playoffs MVP: Joe Nieuwendyk (Stars)

Stanley Cup
- Champions: Dallas Stars
- Runners-up: Buffalo Sabres

NHL seasons
- 1997–98 1999–2000

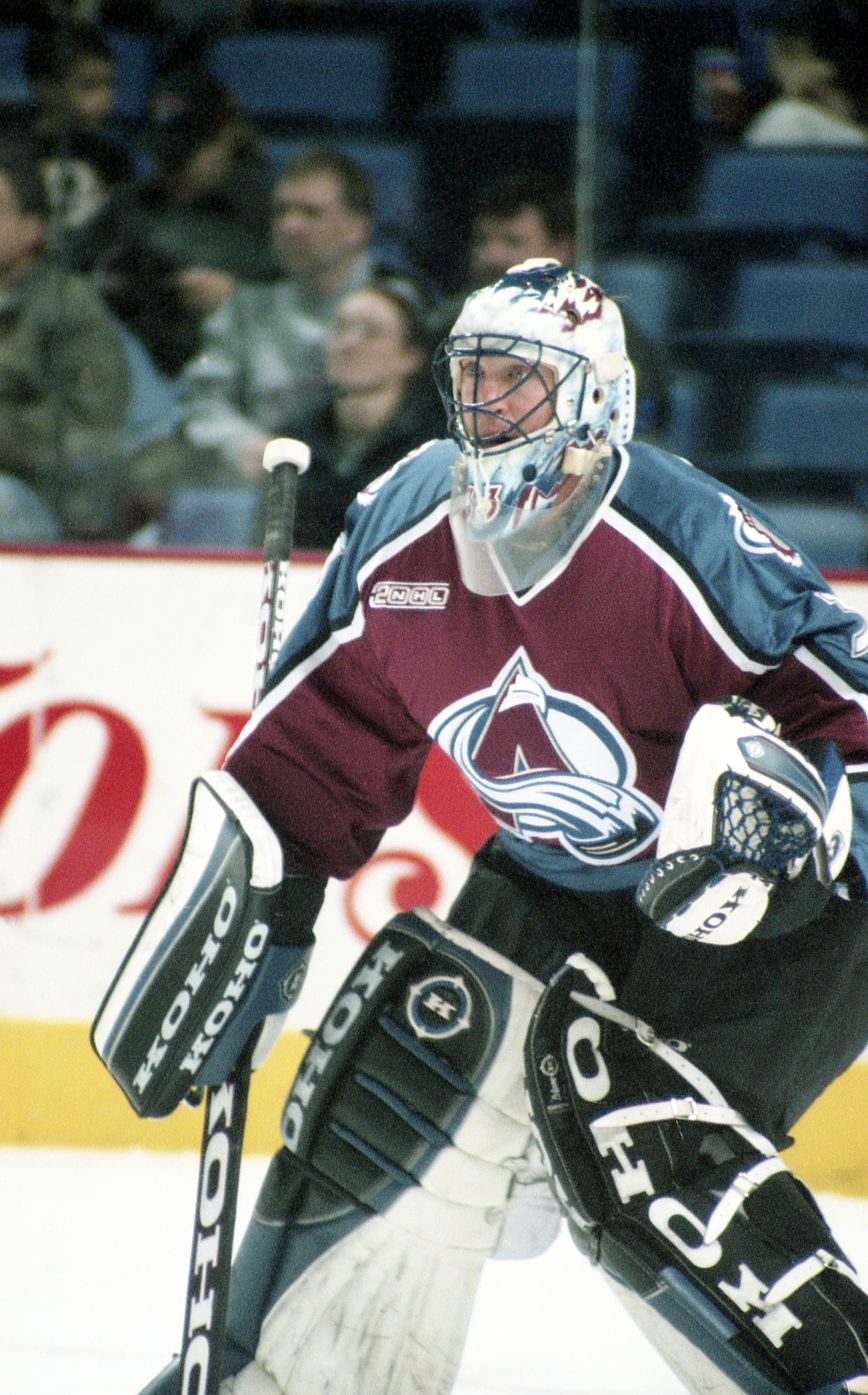
Hockey Hall of Fame goaltender Patrick Roy practicing with the Colorado Avalanche before a game in Buffalo, New York on December 23, 1999

The 1998–99 NHL season was the 82nd regular season of the National Hockey League. The league expanded to 27 teams with the addition of the Nashville Predators. The NHL also realigned to a strictly geographic six-division structure, with three per conference. The 1998–99 season marked the retirement of Wayne Gretzky, the NHL's all-time leading scorer, who played his final three NHL seasons with the New York Rangers. The Dallas Stars finished first in regular season play, and won the Stanley Cup championship over the Buffalo Sabres on a controversial triple-overtime goal by Brett Hull.

== League business ==
=== Expansion and realignment ===
The Nashville Predators joined the NHL, increasing the league to 27 teams. The 1998 NHL expansion draft was held on June 26 to fill the Predators' roster.

With the debut of the Predators, and the planned expansion of three more teams within the next two seasons (Atlanta, Columbus, and Minnesota), the NHL realigned to a strictly geographic six-division structure (three per conference). This erased the last vestiges of the traditional Adams/Patrick/Norris/Smythe four-division structure abandoned in 1993–94. Other than the reassignment of Colorado to the Western Conference in 1995 due to its move from Quebec, the divisions' membership had remained static for five years although several franchises had relocated. As part of this realignment, the Toronto Maple Leafs moved from the Western Conference to the Eastern Conference. This put three of the Original Six teams in the Northeast Division (Boston, Montreal, and Toronto), and the three original cities of the NHL in the Northeast (Montreal, Ottawa, and Toronto). The playoff format was subsequently modified so the three division winners in each conference were seeded one through three by order of point finish, then the top five remaining teams in the conference were seeded four through eight.

=== Entry draft ===
The 1998 NHL entry draft was held on June 27 at the Marine Midland Arena in Buffalo, New York. Vincent Lecavalier was selected first overall by the Tampa Bay Lightning.

=== Rule changes ===
- In an effort to reduce the number of disallowed goals due to the skate-in-the-crease violation, regulatory reforms were implemented resulting the goal crease shape and size being significantly reduced. In spite of this regulatory change, goaltenders and defensive systems continued to dominate the league, as only two teams, the Toronto Maple Leafs and the New Jersey Devils, averaged more than three goals scored per game. In addition, no player reached the 50-goal plateau. A total of 160 shutouts were recorded for the second-straight regular season.
- The league began to phase in a two-referee system. Each team played 20 selected regular games with two referees and two linesmen, instead of just one referee and two linesmen. The two-referee system was also used in all playoff games.

=== Preseason games in Austria ===
Three preseason games were held in Austria. The Tampa Bay Lightning played against Austrian team VEU Feldkirch at Vorarlberghalle in Klagenfurt on September 15. One day later at the same arena, the Buffalo Sabres faced off against KAC Klagenfurt. The Sabres and the Lightning then met at Olympiahalle in Innsbruck on September 18.

== Uniform changes ==
- Anaheim: The third and fourth jerseys from 1997 got new socks.
- Boston: The team wore a 75th-anniversary patch for their 75th season.
- Calgary: New Black Alternates introduced. Crest has its alternate Flaming-Horse Logo.
- Colorado: No updates in the regular season, but in the 1999 Playoffs, the Avalanche wore a CHS patch for the victims of the Columbine High School massacre on their left sleeve just above the number. The patch remained on the jerseys throughout the playoffs.
- Florida: The names on the back become vertically arched, and a navy blue alternate jersey is introduced. On that jersey, the panther is breaking a stick in half.
- Los Angeles: Jerseys Redesigned, Purple is Reintroduced.
- Nashville: white jerseys include a Blue triangle for the Crest, and the blue ones do not. The team wore an Inaugural season patch that would later become the team's alternate logo.
- New York Islanders: The jerseys reverted to its 1978–1995 design, retaining navy blue as its main color with a patch on the right shoulder featuring four diagonal stripes, symbolizing the team's four Stanley Cup titles in the 1980s.
- New York Rangers: White Lady Liberty Jerseys.
- Phoenix: The Coyotes introduce a new green alternate jersey, complete with a desertscape at the bottom and the sleeve ends
- St Louis: Alternates are retired and adopt a new color scheme
- San Jose: Alternates are retired and become the basis of the team's new uniforms.
- Tampa Bay: All-Star Game Patches for the 1999 NHL All-Star Game in Tampa.
- Toronto: Team wore alternate throwbacks and a patch to commemorate their final season at Maple Leaf Gardens.
- Washington: For the first few games, the Capitals wore a patch celebrating their 25th season in the NHL. The patch was worn on the upper right chest.

== Arena changes ==
- The Edmonton Oilers' home arena, Edmonton Coliseum, was renamed Skyreach Centre as part of a new naming rights agreement with Skyreach Equipment.
- The Florida Panthers moved from Miami Arena in Miami to National Car Rental Center in Sunrise, Florida, with National Car Rental acquiring the naming rights.
- The expansion Nashville Predators moved into Gaylord Entertainment Center, with Gaylord Entertainment Company acquiring the naming rights.
- The Philadelphia Flyers's home arena, the CoreStates Center, was renamed the First Union Center after First Union acquired CoreStates Financial Corporation.
- The Toronto Maple Leafs moved from Maple Leaf Gardens to the Air Canada Centre on February 20, 1999, with Air Canada acquiring the naming rights.

== Regular season ==
=== International games ===
The Calgary Flames and the San Jose Sharks played a two-game series on October 9 and 10, 1998 at Yoyogi National Gymnasium in Tokyo, Japan.

=== All-Star Game ===
The All-Star Game was held on January 24, 1999, at Ice Palace in Tampa, home to the Tampa Bay Lightning.

=== Final standings ===
==== Eastern Conference ====
Atlantic Division
R	CR		GP	W	L	T	GF	GA	Pts
1	1	**New Jersey Devils**	82	47	24	11	248	196	105
2	5	**Philadelphia Flyers**	82	37	26	19	231	196	93
3	8	**Pittsburgh Penguins**	82	38	30	14	242	225	90
4	10	New York Rangers	82	33	38	11	217	227	77
5	13	New York Islanders	82	24	48	10	194	244	58

Northeast Division
R	CR		GP	W	L	T	GF	GA	PIM	Pts
1	2	**Ottawa Senators**	82	44	23	15	239	179	892	103
2	4	**Toronto Maple Leafs**	82	45	30	7	268	231	1095	97
3	6	**Boston Bruins**	82	39	30	13	214	181	1182	91
4	7	**Buffalo Sabres**	82	37	28	17	207	175	1561	91
5	11	Montreal Canadiens	82	32	39	11	184	209	1299	75

Southeast Division
R	CR		GP	W	L	T	GF	GA	PIM	Pts
1	3	**Carolina Hurricanes**	82	34	30	18	210	202	1158	86
2	9	Florida Panthers	82	30	34	18	210	228	1522	78
3	12	Washington Capitals	82	31	45	6	200	218	1381	68
4	14	Tampa Bay Lightning	82	19	54	9	179	292	1316	47

Eastern Conference
R		Div	GP	W	L	T	GF	GA	Pts
**1**	**y – New Jersey Devils**	**ATL**	**82**	**47**	**24**	**11**	**248**	**196**	**105**
**2**	**y – Ottawa Senators**	**NE**	**82**	**44**	**23**	**15**	**239**	**179**	**103**
**3**	**y – Carolina Hurricanes**	**SE**	**82**	**34**	**30**	**18**	**210**	**202**	**86**
**4**	**Toronto Maple Leafs**	**NE**	**82**	**45**	**30**	**7**	**268**	**231**	**97**
**5**	**Philadelphia Flyers**	**ATL**	**82**	**37**	**26**	**19**	**231**	**196**	**93**
**6**	**Boston Bruins**	**NE**	**82**	**39**	**30**	**13**	**214**	**181**	**91**
**7**	**Buffalo Sabres**	**NE**	**82**	**37**	**28**	**17**	**207**	**175**	**91**
**8**	**Pittsburgh Penguins**	**ATL**	**82**	**38**	**30**	**14**	**242**	**225**	**90**
9	Florida Panthers	SE	82	30	34	18	210	228	78
10	New York Rangers	ATL	82	33	38	11	217	227	77
11	Montreal Canadiens	NE	82	32	39	11	184	209	75
12	Washington Capitals	SE	82	31	45	6	200	218	68
13	New York Islanders	ATL	82	24	48	10	194	244	58
14	Tampa Bay Lightning	SE	82	19	54	9	179	292	47

Divisions: ATL – Atlantic Division, NE – Northeast Division, SE – Southeast Division

bold – Qualified for playoffs; y – Won division

==== Western Conference ====
Central Division
R	CR		GP	W	L	T	GF	GA	PIM	Pts
1	3	**Detroit Red Wings**	82	43	32	7	245	202	1202	93
2	5	**St. Louis Blues**	82	37	32	13	237	209	1308	87
3	10	Chicago Blackhawks	82	29	41	12	202	248	1807	70
4	12	Nashville Predators	82	28	47	7	190	261	1420	63

Northwest Division
R	CR		GP	W	L	T	GF	GA	PIM	Pts
1	2	**Colorado Avalanche**	82	44	28	10	239	205	1619	98
2	8	**Edmonton Oilers**	82	33	37	12	230	226	1373	78
3	9	Calgary Flames	82	30	40	12	211	234	1389	72
4	13	Vancouver Canucks	82	23	47	12	192	258	1764	58

Pacific Division
R	CR		GP	W	L	T	GF	GA	Pts
1	1	**Dallas Stars**	82	51	19	12	236	168	114
2	4	**Phoenix Coyotes**	82	39	31	12	205	197	90
3	6	**Mighty Ducks of Anaheim**	82	35	34	13	215	206	83
4	7	**San Jose Sharks**	82	31	33	18	196	191	80
5	11	Los Angeles Kings	82	32	45	5	189	222	69

Western Conference
R		Div	GP	W	L	T	GF	GA	Pts
**1**	**p – Dallas Stars**	**PAC**	**82**	**51**	**19**	**12**	**236**	**168**	**114**
**2**	**y – Colorado Avalanche**	**NW**	**82**	**44**	**28**	**10**	**239**	**205**	**98**
**3**	**y – Detroit Red Wings**	**CEN**	**82**	**43**	**32**	**7**	**245**	**202**	**93**
**4**	**Phoenix Coyotes**	**PAC**	**82**	**39**	**31**	**12**	**205**	**197**	**90**
**5**	**St. Louis Blues**	**CEN**	**82**	**37**	**32**	**13**	**237**	**209**	**87**
**6**	**Mighty Ducks of Anaheim**	**PAC**	**82**	**35**	**34**	**13**	**215**	**206**	**83**
**7**	**San Jose Sharks**	**PAC**	**82**	**31**	**33**	**18**	**196**	**191**	**80**
**8**	**Edmonton Oilers**	**NW**	**82**	**33**	**37**	**12**	**230**	**226**	**78**
9	Calgary Flames	NW	82	30	40	12	211	234	72
10	Chicago Blackhawks	CEN	82	29	41	12	202	248	70
11	Los Angeles Kings	PAC	82	32	45	5	189	222	69
12	Nashville Predators	CEN	82	28	47	7	190	261	63
13	Vancouver Canucks	NW	82	23	47	12	192	258	58

Divisions: CEN – Central, PAC – Pacific, NW – Northwest

bold – Qualified for playoffs; p – Won Presidents' Trophy; y – Won division

== Playoffs ==
=== Bracket ===
In each round, teams competed in a best-of-seven series following a 2–2–1–1–1 format (scores in the bracket indicate the number of games won in each best-of-seven series). The team with home ice advantage played at home for games one and two (and games five and seven, if necessary), and the other team played at home for games three and four (and game six, if necessary). The top eight teams in each conference made the playoffs, with the three division winners seeded 1–3 based on regular season record, and the five remaining teams seeded 4–8.

The NHL used "re-seeding" instead of a fixed bracket playoff system. During the first three rounds, the highest remaining seed in each conference was matched against the lowest remaining seed, the second-highest remaining seed played the second-lowest remaining seed, and so forth. The higher-seeded team was awarded home ice advantage. The two conference winners then advanced to the Stanley Cup Finals, where home ice advantage was awarded to the team that had the better regular season record.

Conference quarterfinals	Conference semifinals
1	New Jersey	3
8	Pittsburgh	4
4	Toronto	4
8	Pittsburgh	2
2	Ottawa	0
7	Buffalo	4
Eastern Conference
3	Carolina	2
6	Boston	4
6	Boston	2
7	Buffalo	4
4	Toronto	4
5	Philadelphia	2
1	Dallas	4
8	Edmonton	0
1	Dallas	4
5	St. Louis	2
2	Colorado	4
7	San Jose	2
Western Conference
3	Detroit	4
6	Anaheim	0
2	Colorado	4
3	Detroit	2
4	Phoenix	3
5	St. Louis	4

Conference finals
4	Toronto	1
7	Buffalo	4
1	Dallas	4
2	Colorado	3

Stanley Cup Finals
E7	Buffalo	2
W1	Dallas	4

== Awards ==
The Maurice "Rocket" Richard Trophy for the most goals by a player in a season made its debut this year.

1998–99 NHL awards
Award	Recipient(s)
Presidents' Trophy:	Dallas Stars
Prince of Wales Trophy: (Eastern Conference playoff champion)	Buffalo Sabres
Clarence S. Campbell Bowl: (Western Conference playoff champion)	Dallas Stars
Art Ross Trophy:	Jaromir Jagr, Pittsburgh Penguins
Bill Masterton Memorial Trophy:	John Cullen, Tampa Bay Lightning
Calder Memorial Trophy:	Chris Drury, Colorado Avalanche
Conn Smythe Trophy:	Joe Nieuwendyk, Dallas Stars
Frank J. Selke Trophy:	Jere Lehtinen, Dallas Stars
Hart Memorial Trophy:	Jaromir Jagr, Pittsburgh Penguins
Jack Adams Award:	Jacques Martin, Ottawa Senators
James Norris Memorial Trophy:	Al MacInnis, St. Louis Blues
King Clancy Memorial Trophy:	Rob Ray, Buffalo Sabres
Lady Byng Memorial Trophy:	Wayne Gretzky, New York Rangers
Lester B. Pearson Award:	Jaromir Jagr, Pittsburgh Penguins
Maurice "Rocket" Richard Trophy:	Teemu Selanne, Mighty Ducks of Anaheim
NHL Foundation Player Award:	Rob Ray, Buffalo Sabres
NHL Plus-Minus Award:	John LeClair, Philadelphia Flyers
Vezina Trophy:	Dominik Hasek, Buffalo Sabres
William M. Jennings Trophy:	Ed Belfour and Roman Turek, Dallas Stars

=== All-Star teams ===
First team	Position	Second team
Dominik Hasek, Buffalo Sabres	G	Byron Dafoe, Boston Bruins
Al MacInnis, St. Louis Blues	D	Ray Bourque, Boston Bruins
Nicklas Lidstrom, Detroit Red Wings	D	Eric Desjardins, Philadelphia Flyers
Peter Forsberg, Colorado Avalanche	C	Alexei Yashin, Ottawa Senators
Jaromir Jagr, Pittsburgh Penguins	RW	Teemu Selanne, Mighty Ducks of Anaheim
Paul Kariya, Mighty Ducks of Anaheim	LW	John LeClair, Philadelphia Flyers

== Player statistics ==
=== Scoring leaders ===
Note: GP = Games played; G = Goals; A = Assists; Pts = Points

Player	Team	GP	G	A	Pts	PIM
Jaromir Jagr	Pittsburgh Penguins	81	44	83	127	66
Teemu Selanne	Mighty Ducks of Anaheim	75	47	60	107	30
Paul Kariya	Mighty Ducks of Anaheim	82	39	62	101	40
Peter Forsberg	Colorado Avalanche	78	30	67	97	108
Joe Sakic	Colorado Avalanche	73	41	55	96	29
Alexei Yashin	Ottawa Senators	82	44	50	94	54
Eric Lindros	Philadelphia Flyers	71	40	53	93	120
Theoren Fleury	Calgary Flames /Colorado Avalanche	75	40	53	93	86
John LeClair	Philadelphia Flyers	76	43	47	90	30
Pavol Demitra	St. Louis Blues	82	37	52	89	16

Source: NHL.

=== Leading goaltenders ===
Regular season

Player	Team	GP	MIN	GA	SO	GAA	SV%
Ron Tugnutt	Ottawa	43	2508	75	3	1.79	.925
Dominik Hasek	Buffalo	64	3817	119	9	1.87	.937
Ed Belfour	Dallas	61	3536	117	5	1.99	.915
Byron Dafoe	Boston	68	4001	133	10	1.99	.926
Roman Turek	Dallas	26	1382	48	1	2.08	.915
Nikolai Khabibulin	Phoenix	63	3657	130	8	2.13	.920
John Vanbiesbrouck	Philadelphia	62	3712	135	6	2.18	.902
Steve Shields	San Jose	37	2162	80	4	2.22	.921
Arturs Irbe	Carolina	62	3643	135	6	2.22	.923
Mike Vernon	San Jose	49	2831	107	4	2.27	.911

== Coaches ==
=== Eastern Conference ===
- Boston Bruins: Pat Burns
- Buffalo Sabres: Lindy Ruff
- Carolina Hurricanes: Paul Maurice
- Florida Panthers: Terry Murray
- Montreal Canadiens: Alain Vigneault
- New Jersey Devils: Robbie Ftorek
- New York Islanders: Mike Milbury and Bill Stewart
- New York Rangers: John Muckler
- Ottawa Senators: Jacques Martin
- Philadelphia Flyers: Roger Neilson
- Pittsburgh Penguins: Kevin Constantine
- Tampa Bay Lightning: Jacques Demers
- Toronto Maple Leafs: Pat Quinn
- Washington Capitals: Ron Wilson

=== Western Conference ===
- Mighty Ducks of Anaheim: Craig Hartsburg
- Calgary Flames: Brian Sutter
- Chicago Blackhawks: Dirk Graham and Lorne Molleken
- Colorado Avalanche: Bob Hartley
- Dallas Stars: Ken Hitchcock
- Detroit Red Wings: Scotty Bowman
- Edmonton Oilers: Ron Low
- Los Angeles Kings: Larry Robinson
- Nashville Predators: Barry Trotz
- Phoenix Coyotes: Jim Schoenfeld
- San Jose Sharks: Darryl Sutter
- St. Louis Blues: Joel Quenneville
- Vancouver Canucks: Mike Keenan and Marc Crawford

== Milestones ==
=== Debuts ===
The following is a list of players of note who played their first NHL game in 1998–99 (listed with their first team, an asterisk(*) marks debut in playoffs):

- Martin St. Louis, Calgary Flames
- Chris Drury, Colorado Avalanche
- Milan Hejduk, Colorado Avalanche
- Dan Boyle, Florida Panthers
- Jason Blake, Los Angeles Kings
- David Legwand, Nashville Predators
- Karlis Skrastins, Nashville Predators
- Kimmo Timonen, Nashville Predators
- Eric Brewer, New York Islanders
- Vincent Lecavalier, Tampa Bay Lightning
- Tomas Kaberle, Toronto Maple Leafs

=== Last games ===
The following is a list of players of note who played their last game in the NHL in 1998–99 (listed with their last team):

- Dave Babych, Los Angeles Kings
- Brian Bellows, Washington Capitals
- Jim Carey, St. Louis Blues
- Bobby Carpenter, New Jersey Devils
- Dino Ciccarelli, Florida Panthers
- Russ Courtnall, Los Angeles Kings
- John Cullen, Tampa Bay Lightning
- Wayne Gretzky, New York Rangers
- Ron Hextall, Philadelphia Flyers
- Dale Hunter, Colorado Avalanche
- Craig Ludwig, Dallas Stars
- Jamie Macoun, Detroit Red Wings
- Bernie Nicholls, San Jose Sharks
- Kjell Samuelsson, Tampa Bay Lightning (Last player born in the 1950s)
- Tomas Sandstrom, Mighty Ducks of Anaheim
- Esa Tikkanen, Florida Panthers
- Mark Tinordi, Washington Capitals

== Broadcasting ==
=== Canada ===
This was the first season of the league's Canadian national broadcast rights deals with CBC and CTV Sportsnet. CBC continued to air Saturday night Hockey Night in Canada regular season games. The fledgling CTV Sportsnet replaced TSN as the league's cable broadcaster. Tuesday Night Hockey became CTV Sportsnet's signature weekly regular season telecasts. Coverage of the Stanley Cup playoffs continued to primarily be on CBC, while CTV Sportsnet aired first round all-U.S. series.

=== United States ===
This was the fifth and final season of the league's U.S. national broadcast rights deals with Fox and ESPN. Both ESPN and ESPN2 aired weeknight games throughout the regular season, and Fox had the All-Star Game and weekly regional telecasts on 11 weekend afternoons between February and April. During the first two rounds of the playoffs, ESPN and ESPN2 aired selected games, while Fox had Sunday regional telecasts. Each U.S. team's regional broadcaster produced local coverage of first and second round games (except for those games on Fox). Fox's Sunday telecasts continued into the Conference Finals, while ESPN had the rest of the third round games. The Stanley Cup Finals were also split between Fox and ESPN.

The league then signed a new five-year deal with ESPN that also called for sister network ABC to become the new broadcast network partner.

== See also ==
- List of Stanley Cup champions
- 1998 NHL entry draft
- 1998 NHL expansion draft
- 1998–99 NHL transactions
- 49th National Hockey League All-Star Game
- National Hockey League All-Star Game
- Lester Patrick Trophy
- 1998 in sports
- 1999 in sports
