= 1998–99 Carolina Hurricanes season =

National Hockey League team season

1998–99 Carolina Hurricanes
- Southeast Division champions
- Division: 1st Southeast
- Conference: 3rd Eastern
- 1998–99 record: 34–30–18
- Home record: 20–12–9
- Road record: 14–18–9
- Goals for: 210
- Goals against: 202

Team information
- General manager: Jim Rutherford
- Coach: Paul Maurice
- Captain: Keith Primeau
- Arena: Greensboro Coliseum Complex
- Average attendance: 8,188
- Minor league affiliates: Beast of New Haven; Florida Everblades

Team leaders
- Goals: Keith Primeau (30)
- Assists: Sami Kapanen (35)
- Points: Keith Primeau (62)
- Penalty minutes: Gary Roberts (178)
- Plus/minus: Nolan Pratt (+15)
- Wins: Arturs Irbe (27)
- Goals against average: Arturs Irbe (2.22)

The 1998–99 Carolina Hurricanes season was the second season of the NHL franchise in Greensboro, North Carolina. The club qualified for the playoffs for the first time since 1992, and their first winning season since 1990 (and first time as the Hurricanes), placing first in the NHL Southeast division. The Hurricanes lost in the Eastern Conference Quarterfinals to the Boston Bruins.

== Offseason ==
In a re-organization of the NHL, the club was placed in the new Southeast Division. Another major headline was the signing of former Hartford Whalers captain Ron Francis as a free agent.

== Regular season ==
The Hurricanes struggled on the power-play during the regular season, finishing 27th in power-play percentage, at 10.99%.

The division was weaker than the Hurricanes' previous division, the Northeast and the Hurricanes were able to win the division and qualify for the playoffs, the only team from the division to do so.

=== Final standings ===
Southeast Division
R	CR		GP	W	L	T	GF	GA	PIM	Pts
1	3	**Carolina Hurricanes**	82	34	30	18	210	202	1158	86
2	9	Florida Panthers	82	30	34	18	210	228	1522	78
3	12	Washington Capitals	82	31	45	6	200	218	1381	68
4	14	Tampa Bay Lightning	82	19	54	9	179	292	1316	47

Eastern Conference
R		Div	GP	W	L	T	GF	GA	Pts
**1**	**y – New Jersey Devils**	**ATL**	**82**	**47**	**24**	**11**	**248**	**196**	**105**
**2**	**y – Ottawa Senators**	**NE**	**82**	**44**	**23**	**15**	**239**	**179**	**103**
**3**	**y – Carolina Hurricanes**	**SE**	**82**	**34**	**30**	**18**	**210**	**202**	**86**
**4**	**Toronto Maple Leafs**	**NE**	**82**	**45**	**30**	**7**	**268**	**231**	**97**
**5**	**Philadelphia Flyers**	**ATL**	**82**	**37**	**26**	**19**	**231**	**196**	**93**
**6**	**Boston Bruins**	**NE**	**82**	**39**	**30**	**13**	**214**	**181**	**91**
**7**	**Buffalo Sabres**	**NE**	**82**	**37**	**28**	**17**	**207**	**175**	**91**
**8**	**Pittsburgh Penguins**	**ATL**	**82**	**38**	**30**	**14**	**242**	**225**	**90**
9	Florida Panthers	SE	82	30	34	18	210	228	78
10	New York Rangers	ATL	82	33	38	11	217	227	77
11	Montreal Canadiens	NE	82	32	39	11	184	209	75
12	Washington Capitals	SE	82	31	45	6	200	218	68
13	New York Islanders	ATL	82	24	48	10	194	244	58
14	Tampa Bay Lightning	SE	82	19	54	9	179	292	47

Divisions: ATL – Atlantic Division, NE – Northeast Division, SE – Southeast Division

bold – Qualified for playoffs; y – Won division

== Playoffs ==
The Hurricanes drew the Boston Bruins as their first-round opponent. The Hurricanes were defeated in six games.

== Schedule and results ==
=== Regular season ===
1998–99 regular season
October: 4–3–3 (home: 2–1–3; road: 2–2–0)

Game	Date	Score	Opponent	Record	Attendance	Recap
1	October 10, 1998	4–4 OT	Tampa Bay Lightning (1998–99)	0–0–1	8,195	T
2	October 13, 1998	2–3	@ Nashville Predators (1998–99)	0–1–1	14,376	L
3	October 15, 1998	2–2 OT	Dallas Stars (1998–99)	0–1–2	5,531	T
4	October 17, 1998	1–1 OT	Philadelphia Flyers (1998–99)	0–1–3	10,063	T
5	October 20, 1998	3–1	Vancouver Canucks (1998–99)	1–1–3	5,573	W
6	October 24, 1998	3–1	@ Ottawa Senators (1998–99)	2–1–3	14,428	W
7	October 25, 1998	2–3	Los Angeles Kings (1998–99)	2–2–3	5,569	L
8	October 28, 1998	2–0	Chicago Blackhawks (1998–99)	3–2–3	5,902	W
9	October 30, 1998	0–1	@ New York Rangers (1998–99)	3–3–3	18,200	L
10	October 31, 1998	2–0	@ Boston Bruins (1998–99)	4–3–3	13,655	W

November: 7–7–0 (home: 3–4–0; road: 4–3–0)

Game	Date	Score	Opponent	Record	Attendance	Recap
11	November 2, 1998	2–3	Colorado Avalanche (1998–99)	4–4–3	6,205	L
12	November 5, 1998	6–3	@ New York Islanders (1998–99)	5–4–3	10,856	W
13	November 6, 1998	3–2	@ Washington Capitals (1998–99)	6–4–3	19,740	W
14	November 8, 1998	2–5	Boston Bruins (1998–99)	6–5–3	8,566	L
15	November 11, 1998	4–5 OT	@ Mighty Ducks of Anaheim (1998–99)	6–6–3	14,668	L
16	November 12, 1998	0–3	@ San Jose Sharks (1998–99)	6–7–3	16,733	L
17	November 14, 1998	5–3	@ Los Angeles Kings (1998–99)	7–7–3	10,990	W
18	November 17, 1998	5–4	Montreal Canadiens (1998–99)	8–7–3	7,147	W
19	November 19, 1998	2–3 OT	@ New Jersey Devils (1998–99)	8–8–3	14,586	L
20	November 20, 1998	1–3	Philadelphia Flyers (1998–99)	8–9–3	11,013	L
21	November 22, 1998	2–5	New Jersey Devils (1998–99)	8–10–3	8,062	L
22	November 25, 1998	3–0	San Jose Sharks (1998–99)	9–10–3	6,037	W
23	November 28, 1998	3–1	@ New York Islanders (1998–99)	10–10–3	12,472	W
24	November 29, 1998	3–1	Mighty Ducks of Anaheim (1998–99)	11–10–3	6,871	W

December: 6–4–2 (home: 4–3–1; road: 2–1–1)

Game	Date	Score	Opponent	Record	Attendance	Recap
25	December 2, 1998	4–1	Montreal Canadiens (1998–99)	12–10–3	5,664	W
26	December 4, 1998	3–3 OT	Pittsburgh Penguins (1998–99)	12–10–4	9,083	T
27	December 5, 1998	3–3 OT	@ Florida Panthers (1998–99)	12–10–5	17,384	T
28	December 10, 1998	2–3	Boston Bruins (1998–99)	12–11–5	6,059	L
29	December 12, 1998	3–0	Detroit Red Wings (1998–99)	13–11–5	11,059	W
30	December 15, 1998	3–0	Edmonton Oilers (1998–99)	14–11–5	5,684	W
31	December 18, 1998	1–5	@ Ottawa Senators (1998–99)	14–12–5	15,124	L
32	December 19, 1998	3–2	@ Buffalo Sabres (1998–99)	15–12–5	17,979	W
33	December 21, 1998	1–4	Buffalo Sabres (1998–99)	15–13–5	7,655	L
34	December 23, 1998	1–0	@ New York Rangers (1998–99)	16–13–5	18,200	W
35	December 26, 1998	3–6	New York Rangers (1998–99)	16–14–5	11,059	L
36	December 30, 1998	4–3	Tampa Bay Lightning (1998–99)	17–14–5	7,898	W

January: 6–4–3 (home: 4–1–1; road: 2–3–2)

Game	Date	Score	Opponent	Record	Attendance	Recap
37	January 1, 1999	3–3 OT	@ Florida Panthers (1998–99)	17–14–6	18,505	T
38	January 2, 1999	4–1	Nashville Predators (1998–99)	18–14–6	7,698	W
39	January 4, 1999	4–4 OT	Ottawa Senators (1998–99)	18–14–7	5,655	T
40	January 7, 1999	2–4	@ Pittsburgh Penguins (1998–99)	18–15–7	13,719	L
41	January 9, 1999	0–2	@ Philadelphia Flyers (1998–99)	18–16–7	19,618	L
42	January 14, 1999	3–2	Florida Panthers (1998–99)	19–16–7	6,544	W
43	January 16, 1999	2–3 OT	Washington Capitals (1998–99)	19–17–7	11,007	L
44	January 18, 1999	4–2	Toronto Maple Leafs (1998–99)	20–17–7	8,894	W
45	January 21, 1999	1–4	@ Detroit Red Wings (1998–99)	20–18–7	19,983	L
46	January 26, 1999	5–3	@ Pittsburgh Penguins (1998–99)	21–18–7	14,731	W
47	January 28, 1999	3–2 OT	New York Rangers (1998–99)	22–18–7	11,059	W
48	January 30, 1999	3–1	@ Montreal Canadiens (1998–99)	23–18–7	20,514	W
49	January 31, 1999	0–0 OT	@ Boston Bruins (1998–99)	23–18–8	16,180	T

February: 4–5–4 (home: 1–1–2; road: 3–4–2)

Game	Date	Score	Opponent	Record	Attendance	Recap
50	February 3, 1999	1–4	New Jersey Devils (1998–99)	23–19–8	7,746	L
51	February 5, 1999	1–4	@ Washington Capitals (1998–99)	23–20–8	17,601	L
52	February 6, 1999	3–3 OT	Florida Panthers (1998–99)	23–20–9	11,059	T
53	February 10, 1999	6–5	@ Toronto Maple Leafs (1998–99)	24–20–9	15,726	W
54	February 12, 1999	3–1	@ New York Rangers (1998–99)	25–20–9	18,200	W
55	February 13, 1999	4–6	@ New Jersey Devils (1998–99)	25–21–9	17,023	L
56	February 15, 1999	2–3	@ Buffalo Sabres (1998–99)	25–22–9	18,595	L
57	February 18, 1999	2–2 OT	Washington Capitals (1998–99)	25–22–10	6,697	T
58	February 20, 1999	3–2	@ Tampa Bay Lightning (1998–99)	26–22–10	10,464	W
59	February 21, 1999	4–1	New York Islanders (1998–99)	27–22–10	9,913	W
60	February 24, 1999	2–2 OT	@ Toronto Maple Leafs (1998–99)	27–22–11	18,460	T
61	February 26, 1999	0–1	@ Vancouver Canucks (1998–99)	27–23–11	15,072	L
62	February 27, 1999	2–2 OT	@ Edmonton Oilers (1998–99)	27–23–12	17,100	T

March: 4–5–4 (home: 4–2–1; road: 0–3–3)

Game	Date	Score	Opponent	Record	Attendance	Recap
63	March 3, 1999	2–1	Boston Bruins (1998–99)	28–23–12	7,507	W
64	March 6, 1999	2–2 OT	@ Florida Panthers (1998–99)	28–23–13	19,250	T
65	March 8, 1999	4–1	Buffalo Sabres (1998–99)	29–23–13	8,390	W
66	March 10, 1999	2–3 OT	Pittsburgh Penguins (1998–99)	29–24–13	10,563	L
67	March 12, 1999	2–1	Calgary Flames (1998–99)	30–24–13	8,564	W
68	March 15, 1999	5–5 OT	@ Phoenix Coyotes (1998–99)	30–24–14	15,811	T
69	March 18, 1999	2–3	@ Colorado Avalanche (1998–99)	30–25–14	16,061	L
70	March 21, 1999	2–3 OT	@ Dallas Stars (1998–99)	30–26–14	16,928	L
71	March 22, 1999	2–5	@ St. Louis Blues (1998–99)	30–27–14	17,311	L
72	March 24, 1999	2–1	New York Islanders (1998–99)	31–27–14	7,370	W
73	March 26, 1999	2–7	Toronto Maple Leafs (1998–99)	31–28–14	10,014	L
74	March 28, 1999	3–3 OT	Tampa Bay Lightning (1998–99)	31–28–15	10,010	T
75	March 30, 1999	3–3 OT	@ Philadelphia Flyers (1998–99)	31–28–16	19,681	T

April: 3–2–2 (home: 2–0–1; road: 1–2–1)

Game	Date	Score	Opponent	Record	Attendance	Recap
76	April 3, 1999	1–2	@ Chicago Blackhawks (1998–99)	31–29–16	15,824	L
77	April 6, 1999	4–2	New Jersey Devils (1998–99)	32–29–16	10,340	W
78	April 7, 1999	0–2	@ Montreal Canadiens (1998–99)	32–30–16	20,336	L
79	April 10, 1999	6–1	@ New York Islanders (1998–99)	33–30–16	13,055	W
80	April 14, 1999	3–0	Washington Capitals (1998–99)	34–30–16	6,790	W
81	April 16, 1999	2–2 OT	@ Tampa Bay Lightning (1998–99)	34–30–17	15,277	T
82	April 17, 1999	1–1 OT	Ottawa Senators (1998–99)	34–30–18	10,981	T

Legend: W Win (2 points) L Loss (0 points) T Tie (1 point)

=== Playoffs ===
1999 Stanley Cup playoffs
Eastern Conference Quarterfinals vs. (6) Boston Bruins – Bruins win 4–2

Game	Date	Score	Opponent	Series	Recap
1	April 22, 1999	0–2	Boston Bruins	Bruins lead 1–0	L
2	April 24, 1999	3–2 OT	Boston Bruins	Series tied 1–1	W
3	April 26, 1999	3–2	@ Boston Bruins	Hurricanes lead 2–1	W
4	April 28, 1999	1–4	@ Boston Bruins	Series tied 2–2	L
5	April 30, 1999	3–4 2OT	Boston Bruins	Bruins lead 3–2	L
6	May 2, 1999	0–2	@ Boston Bruins	Bruins win 4–2	L

Legend: W Win L Loss

== Player statistics ==
=== Scoring ===
- Position abbreviations: C = Center; D = Defense; G = Goaltender; LW = Left wing; RW = Right wing
- † = Joined team via a transaction (e.g., trade, waivers, signing) during the season. Stats reflect time with the Hurricanes only.
- ‡ = Left team via a transaction (e.g., trade, waivers, release) during the season. Stats reflect time with the Hurricanes only.

No.	Player	Pos	Regular season						Playoffs					
No.	Player	Pos	GP	G	A	Pts	+/-	PIM	GP	G	A	Pts	+/-	PIM
55	Keith Primeau	C	78	30	32	62	8	75	6	0	3	3	−3	6
24	Sami Kapanen	RW	81	24	35	59	−1	10	5	1	1	2	−2	0
26	Ray Sheppard	RW	74	25	33	58	4	16	6	5	1	6	−2	2
21	Ron Francis	C	82	21	31	52	−2	34	3	0	1	1	1	0
10	Gary Roberts	LW	77	14	28	42	2	178	6	1	1	2	−3	8
92	Jeff O'Neill	RW	75	16	15	31	3	66	6	0	1	1	−5	0
23	Martin Gelinas	LW	76	13	15	28	3	67	6	0	3	3	−4	2
18	Robert Kron	LW	75	9	16	25	−13	10	5	2	0	2	2	0
2	Glen Wesley	D	74	7	17	24	14	44	6	0	0	0	0	2
19	Nelson Emerson‡	RW	35	8	13	21	1	36	—	—	—	—	—	—
28	Paul Ranheim	LW	78	9	10	19	4	39	6	0	0	0	0	2
11	Kevin Dineen	RW	67	8	10	18	5	97	6	0	0	0	0	8
13	Bates Battaglia	LW	60	7	11	18	7	22	6	0	3	3	3	8
44	Kent Manderville	C	81	5	11	16	9	38	6	0	0	0	0	2
4	Nolan Pratt	D	61	1	14	15	15	95	3	0	0	0	0	2
51	Andrei Kovalenko†	RW	18	6	6	12	3	0	4	0	2	2	1	2
5	Marek Malik	D	52	2	9	11	−6	36	4	0	0	0	−2	4
77	Paul Coffey†	D	44	2	8	10	−1	28	5	0	1	1	0	2
22	Sean Hill	D	54	0	10	10	9	48	—	—	—	—	—	—
7	Curtis Leschyshyn	D	65	2	7	9	−1	50	6	0	0	0	−3	6
3	Steve Chiasson	D	28	1	8	9	7	16	6	1	2	3	1	2
6	Adam Burt‡	D	51	0	3	3	3	46	—	—	—	—	—	—
14	Steven Halko	D	20	0	3	3	5	24	4	0	0	0	−2	2
33	Dave Karpa	D	33	0	2	2	1	55	2	0	0	0	−2	2
46	Mike Rucinski	D	15	0	1	1	1	8	—	—	—	—	—	—
1	Arturs Irbe	G	62	0	0	0		10	6	0	0	0		0
37	Trevor Kidd	G	25	0	0	0		0	—	—	—	—	—	—
31	Craig MacDonald	LW	11	0	0	0	0	0	1	0	0	0	0	0
15	Byron Ritchie	C	3	0	0	0	0	0	—	—	—	—	—	—
45	Shane Willis	RW	7	0	0	0	−2	0	—	—	—	—	—	—

=== Goaltending ===
No.	Player	Regular season										Playoffs								
No.	Player	GP	W	L	T	SA	GA	GAA	SV%	SO	TOI	GP	W	L	SA	GA	GAA	SV%	SO	TOI
1	Arturs Irbe	62	27	20	12	1753	135	2.22	.923	6	3643	6	2	4	181	15	2.21	.917	0	408
37	Trevor Kidd	25	7	10	6	640	61	2.70	.905	2	1358	—	—	—	—	—	—	—	—	—

== Awards and records ==
=== Awards ===
Type	Award/honor	Recipient	Ref
League (in-season)	NHL All-Star Game selection	Arturs Irbe	
League (in-season)	NHL All-Star Game selection	Keith Primeau	
League (in-season)	NHL Player of the Month	Arturs Irbe (October)	
League (in-season)	NHL Player of the Week	Arturs Irbe (November 2)	

=== Milestones ===
Milestone	Player	Date	Ref
First game	Byron Ritchie	December 21, 1998	
First game	Craig MacDonald	January 7, 1999	
First game	Shane Willis	February 5, 1999	

== Transactions ==
The Hurricanes were involved in the following transactions during the 1998–99 season.

=== Trades ===
June 1, 1998	To Colorado Avalanche 5th round pick in 1999 - Will Magnuson	To Carolina Hurricanes Randy Petruk
July 29, 1998	To Los Angeles Kings Manny Legace	To Carolina Hurricanes Future Considerations
August 11, 1998	To Anaheim Mighty Ducks Stu Grimson; Kevin Haller	To Carolina Hurricanes Dave Karpa; 4th round pick in 2000 - Blake Robson
December 29, 1998	To Chicago Blackhawks Nelson Emerson	To Carolina Hurricanes Paul Coffey
March 6, 1999	To Philadelphia Flyers Adam Burt	To Carolina Hurricanes Andrei Kovalenko

=== Free agents ===
Player	Former team
Ron Francis	Pittsburgh Penguins
Al Iafrate	Nashville Predators
Scott Levins	Phoenix Coyotes
Arturs Irbe	Vancouver Canucks

Player	New team
Steve Martins	Ottawa Senators
Dan Kesa	Pittsburgh Penguins
Jason McBain	Las Vegas Thunder (IHL)
Stephen Leach	Ottawa Senators

== Draft picks ==
Carolina's draft picks at the 1998 NHL entry draft held at the Marine Midland Arena in Buffalo, New York.

Round	#	Player	Nationality	College/Junior/Club team (League)
1	11	Jeff Heerema	Canada	Sarnia Sting (OHL)
3	70	Kevin Holdridge	Canada	Plymouth Whalers (OHL)
3	71	Erik Cole	United States	Clarkson University (ECAC)
4	91	Josef Vasicek	Czech Republic	Slavia Prague (Czech Republic)
4	93	Tommy Westlund	Sweden	Brynas IF (Sweden)
4	97	Chris Madden	United States	Guelph Storm (OHL)
7	184	Donald Smith	United States	Clarkson University (ECAC)
8	208	Jaroslav Svoboda	Czech Republic	HC Olomouc (Czech Republic)
8	211	Mark Kosick	Canada	University of Michigan (CCHA)
9	239	Brent McDonald	Canada	Prince George Cougars (WHL)

== Farm teams ==
=== American Hockey League ===
The Beast of New Haven were the Hurricanes American Hockey League affiliate for the 1998–99 AHL season.

=== East Coast Hockey League ===
The Florida Everblades were the Hurricanes East Coast Hockey League affiliate.
