= 1998–99 New Jersey Devils season =

National Hockey League season

1998–99 New Jersey Devils
- Atlantic Division champions
- Division: 1st Atlantic
- Conference: 1st Eastern
- 1998–99 record: 47–24–11
- Home record: 19–14–8
- Road record: 28–10–3
- Goals for: 248
- Goals against: 196

Team information
- General manager: Lou Lamoriello
- Coach: Robbie Ftorek
- Captain: Scott Stevens
- Alternate captains: Denis Pederson; Ken Daneyko; Randy McKay
- Arena: Continental Airlines Arena
- Average attendance: 16,670
- Minor league affiliates: Albany River Rats; Augusta Lynx

Team leaders
- Goals: Petr Sykora (29)
- Assists: Petr Sykora (43)
- Points: Petr Sykora (72)
- Penalty minutes: Krzysztof Oliwa (240)
- Plus/minus: Scott Stevens (+29)
- Wins: Martin Brodeur (39)
- Goals against average: Martin Brodeur (2.29)

The 1998–99 New Jersey Devils season was the 25th season for the National Hockey League (NHL) franchise that was established on June 11, 1974, and 17th season since the franchise relocated from Colorado prior to the 1982–83 NHL season. Despite winning the Atlantic Division and being the top seed in the Eastern Conference, the Devils were eliminated in the first round of the playoffs.

== Regular season ==
The Devils' 28 regular-season road wins were the most in the NHL.

=== Season standings ===
Atlantic Division
| R | CR | | GP | W | L | T | GF | GA | Pts |
|---|---|---|---|---|---|---|---|---|---|
| 1 | 1 | **New Jersey Devils** | 82 | 47 | 24 | 11 | 248 | 196 | 105 |
| 2 | 5 | **Philadelphia Flyers** | 82 | 37 | 26 | 19 | 231 | 196 | 93 |
| 3 | 8 | **Pittsburgh Penguins** | 82 | 38 | 30 | 14 | 242 | 225 | 90 |
| 4 | 10 | New York Rangers | 82 | 33 | 38 | 11 | 217 | 227 | 77 |
| 5 | 13 | New York Islanders | 82 | 24 | 48 | 10 | 194 | 244 | 58 |

Eastern Conference
| R | | Div | GP | W | L | T | GF | GA | Pts |
|---|---|---|---|---|---|---|---|---|---|
| **1** | **y – New Jersey Devils** | **ATL** | **82** | **47** | **24** | **11** | **248** | **196** | **105** |
| **2** | **y – Ottawa Senators** | **NE** | **82** | **44** | **23** | **15** | **239** | **179** | **103** |
| **3** | **y – Carolina Hurricanes** | **SE** | **82** | **34** | **30** | **18** | **210** | **202** | **86** |
| **4** | **Toronto Maple Leafs** | **NE** | **82** | **45** | **30** | **7** | **268** | **231** | **97** |
| **5** | **Philadelphia Flyers** | **ATL** | **82** | **37** | **26** | **19** | **231** | **196** | **93** |
| **6** | **Boston Bruins** | **NE** | **82** | **39** | **30** | **13** | **214** | **181** | **91** |
| **7** | **Buffalo Sabres** | **NE** | **82** | **37** | **28** | **17** | **207** | **175** | **91** |
| **8** | **Pittsburgh Penguins** | **ATL** | **82** | **38** | **30** | **14** | **242** | **225** | **90** |
| 9 | Florida Panthers | SE | 82 | 30 | 34 | 18 | 210 | 228 | 78 |
| 10 | New York Rangers | ATL | 82 | 33 | 38 | 11 | 217 | 227 | 77 |
| 11 | Montreal Canadiens | NE | 82 | 32 | 39 | 11 | 184 | 209 | 75 |
| 12 | Washington Capitals | SE | 82 | 31 | 45 | 6 | 200 | 218 | 68 |
| 13 | New York Islanders | ATL | 82 | 24 | 48 | 10 | 194 | 244 | 58 |
| 14 | Tampa Bay Lightning | SE | 82 | 19 | 54 | 9 | 179 | 292 | 47 |

Divisions: ATL – Atlantic Division, NE – Northeast Division, SE – Southeast Division

bold – Qualified for playoffs; y – Won division

== Playoffs ==
The Devils opened the 1999 playoffs against the Pittsburgh Penguins having only reached the second round of the playoffs once in the three years following its 1995 Cup win. They appeared to be on their way to a series victory against the Penguins when they led Game 6 late; but Pittsburgh's Jaromir Jagr, silent all series to that point, scored with two minutes to go in the third to send the game to overtime and later scored the overtime winner to ensure a seventh game. The Devils never recovered, never once leading in Game 7 before eventually losing 4–2.

== Schedule and results ==
=== Regular season ===
1998–99 regular season
October: 5–4–0 (home: 2–3–0; road: 3–1–0)

| Game | Date | Score | Opponent | Record | Recap |
|---|---|---|---|---|---|
| 1 | October 10, 1998 | 1–2 | @ Chicago Blackhawks (1998–99) | 0–1–0 | L |
| 2 | October 14, 1998 | 1–3 | Pittsburgh Penguins (1998–99) | 0–2–0 | L |
| 3 | October 16, 1998 | 2–1 | @ New York Rangers (1998–99) | 1–2–0 | W |
| 4 | October 17, 1998 | 2–4 | Edmonton Oilers (1998–99) | 1–3–0 | L |
| 5 | October 22, 1998 | 3–2 | @ Philadelphia Flyers (1998–99) | 2–3–0 | W |
| 6 | October 24, 1998 | 3–1 | Boston Bruins (1998–99) | 3–3–0 | W |
| 7 | October 28, 1998 | 0–4 | Los Angeles Kings (1998–99) | 3–4–0 | L |
| 8 | October 29, 1998 | 2–1 | @ New York Islanders (1998–99) | 4–4–0 | W |
| 9 | October 31, 1998 | 3–1 | Florida Panthers (1998–99) | 5–4–0 | W |

November: 8–3–1 (home: 4–0–1; road: 4–3–0)

| Game | Date | Score | Opponent | Record | Recap |
|---|---|---|---|---|---|
| 10 | November 3, 1998 | 3–1 | New York Rangers (1998–99) | 6–4–0 | W |
| 11 | November 7, 1998 | 4–3 | @ Florida Panthers (1998–99) | 7–4–0 | W |
| 12 | November 8, 1998 | 1–3 | @ Tampa Bay Lightning (1998–99) | 7–5–0 | L |
| 13 | November 11, 1998 | 3–0 | Montreal Canadiens (1998–99) | 8–5–0 | W |
| 14 | November 13, 1998 | 4–3 | Pittsburgh Penguins (1998–99) | 9–5–0 | W |
| 15 | November 14, 1998 | 1–6 | @ Philadelphia Flyers (1998–99) | 9–6–0 | L |
| 16 | November 19, 1998 | 3–2 OT | Carolina Hurricanes (1998–99) | 10–6–0 | W |
| 17 | November 21, 1998 | 3–3 OT | Florida Panthers (1998–99) | 10–6–1 | T |
| 18 | November 22, 1998 | 5–2 | @ Carolina Hurricanes (1998–99) | 11–6–1 | W |
| 19 | November 25, 1998 | 5–2 | @ Dallas Stars (1998–99) | 12–6–1 | W |
| 20 | November 26, 1998 | 2–3 | @ Phoenix Coyotes (1998–99) | 12–7–1 | L |
| 21 | November 28, 1998 | 3–2 | @ Colorado Avalanche (1998–99) | 13–7–1 | W |

December: 8–2–3 (home: 3–2–2; road: 5–0–1)

| Game | Date | Score | Opponent | Record | Recap |
|---|---|---|---|---|---|
| 22 | December 1, 1998 | 4–0 | @ Washington Capitals (1998–99) | 14–7–1 | W |
| 23 | December 4, 1998 | 1–1 OT | Montreal Canadiens (1998–99) | 14–7–2 | T |
| 24 | December 5, 1998 | 7–5 | @ New York Islanders (1998–99) | 15–7–2 | W |
| 25 | December 8, 1998 | 5–5 OT | Philadelphia Flyers (1998–99) | 15–7–3 | T |
| 26 | December 10, 1998 | 5–4 OT | @ Philadelphia Flyers (1998–99) | 16–7–3 | W |
| 27 | December 12, 1998 | 5–3 | Colorado Avalanche (1998–99) | 17–7–3 | W |
| 28 | December 16, 1998 | 6–3 | New York Rangers (1998–99) | 18–7–3 | W |
| 29 | December 18, 1998 | 2–5 | Calgary Flames (1998–99) | 18–8–3 | L |
| 30 | December 19, 1998 | 1–1 OT | @ Montreal Canadiens (1998–99) | 18–8–4 | T |
| 31 | December 23, 1998 | 4–2 | St. Louis Blues (1998–99) | 19–8–4 | W |
| 32 | December 26, 1998 | 0–2 | Buffalo Sabres (1998–99) | 19–9–4 | L |
| 33 | December 28, 1998 | 7–4 | @ Buffalo Sabres (1998–99) | 20–9–4 | W |
| 34 | December 30, 1998 | 3–2 | @ Washington Capitals (1998–99) | 21–9–4 | W |

January: 6–6–1 (home: 2–3–1; road: 4–3–0)

| Game | Date | Score | Opponent | Record | Recap |
|---|---|---|---|---|---|
| 35 | January 2, 1999 | 0–6 | @ Ottawa Senators (1998–99) | 21–10–4 | L |
| 36 | January 5, 1999 | 3–3 OT | San Jose Sharks (1998–99) | 21–10–5 | T |
| 37 | January 6, 1999 | 5–2 | @ New York Rangers (1998–99) | 22–10–5 | W |
| 38 | January 9, 1999 | 2–3 | Washington Capitals (1998–99) | 22–11–5 | L |
| 39 | January 11, 1999 | 2–4 | Ottawa Senators (1998–99) | 22–12–5 | L |
| 40 | January 14, 1999 | 2–3 | @ Ottawa Senators (1998–99) | 22–13–5 | L |
| 41 | January 15, 1999 | 3–1 | Tampa Bay Lightning (1998–99) | 23–13–5 | W |
| 42 | January 18, 1999 | 1–3 | @ San Jose Sharks (1998–99) | 23–14–5 | L |
| 43 | January 20, 1999 | 4–3 | @ Mighty Ducks of Anaheim (1998–99) | 24–14–5 | W |
| 44 | January 21, 1999 | 3–2 | @ Los Angeles Kings (1998–99) | 25–14–5 | W |
| 45 | January 26, 1999 | 4–1 | Ottawa Senators (1998–99) | 26–14–5 | W |
| 46 | January 28, 1999 | 2–0 | @ Boston Bruins (1998–99) | 27–14–5 | W |
| 47 | January 30, 1999 | 2–3 OT | Nashville Predators (1998–99) | 27–15–5 | L |

February: 6–5–3 (home: 3–4–2; road: 3–1–1)

| Game | Date | Score | Opponent | Record | Recap |
|---|---|---|---|---|---|
| 48 | February 1, 1999 | 2–2 OT | Detroit Red Wings (1998–99) | 27–15–6 | T |
| 49 | February 3, 1999 | 4–1 | @ Carolina Hurricanes (1998–99) | 28–15–6 | W |
| 50 | February 4, 1999 | 2–0 | @ St. Louis Blues (1998–99) | 29–15–6 | W |
| 51 | February 6, 1999 | 2–3 | Toronto Maple Leafs (1998–99) | 29–16–6 | L |
| 52 | February 9, 1999 | 3–4 | Vancouver Canucks (1998–99) | 29–17–6 | L |
| 53 | February 12, 1999 | 2–3 | Washington Capitals (1998–99) | 29–18–6 | L |
| 54 | February 13, 1999 | 6–4 | Carolina Hurricanes (1998–99) | 30–18–6 | W |
| 55 | February 15, 1999 | 3–3 OT | Toronto Maple Leafs (1998–99) | 30–18–7 | T |
| 56 | February 17, 1999 | 7–1 | Tampa Bay Lightning (1998–99) | 31–18–7 | W |
| 57 | February 19, 1999 | 1–3 | @ Detroit Red Wings (1998–99) | 31–19–7 | L |
| 58 | February 20, 1999 | 2–3 | New York Islanders (1998–99) | 31–20–7 | L |
| 59 | February 22, 1999 | 3–2 | @ Tampa Bay Lightning (1998–99) | 32–20–7 | W |
| 60 | February 25, 1999 | 3–3 OT | @ Boston Bruins (1998–99) | 32–20–8 | T |
| 61 | February 28, 1999 | 4–1 | Phoenix Coyotes (1998–99) | 33–20–8 | W |

March: 7–2–3 (home: 2–1–2; road: 5–1–1)

| Game | Date | Score | Opponent | Record | Recap |
|---|---|---|---|---|---|
| 62 | March 3, 1999 | 5–2 | @ Toronto Maple Leafs (1998–99) | 34–20–8 | W |
| 63 | March 5, 1999 | 1–4 | Boston Bruins (1998–99) | 34–21–8 | L |
| 64 | March 7, 1999 | 4–2 | @ New York Islanders (1998–99) | 35–21–8 | W |
| 65 | March 9, 1999 | 3–2 | @ Pittsburgh Penguins (1998–99) | 36–21–8 | W |
| 66 | March 15, 1999 | 2–1 | @ Vancouver Canucks (1998–99) | 37–21–8 | W |
| 67 | March 17, 1999 | 4–1 | @ Edmonton Oilers (1998–99) | 38–21–8 | W |
| 68 | March 20, 1999 | 1–3 | @ Toronto Maple Leafs (1998–99) | 38–22–8 | L |
| 69 | March 23, 1999 | 1–1 OT | Buffalo Sabres (1998–99) | 38–22–9 | T |
| 70 | March 25, 1999 | 5–3 | Pittsburgh Penguins (1998–99) | 39–22–9 | W |
| 71 | March 27, 1999 | 4–4 OT | Chicago Blackhawks (1998–99) | 39–22–10 | T |
| 72 | March 28, 1999 | 2–2 OT | @ Florida Panthers (1998–99) | 39–22–11 | T |
| 73 | March 31, 1999 | 7–1 | Mighty Ducks of Anaheim (1998–99) | 40–22–11 | W |

April: 7–2–0 (home: 3–1–0; road: 4–1–0)

| Game | Date | Score | Opponent | Record | Recap |
|---|---|---|---|---|---|
| 74 | April 3, 1999 | 4–2 | @ Pittsburgh Penguins (1998–99) | 41–22–11 | W |
| 75 | April 4, 1999 | 4–1 | New York Rangers (1998–99) | 42–22–11 | W |
| 76 | April 6, 1999 | 2–4 | @ Carolina Hurricanes (1998–99) | 42–23–11 | L |
| 77 | April 8, 1999 | 1–0 | Washington Capitals (1998–99) | 43–23–11 | W |
| 78 | April 10, 1999 | 6–2 | @ Montreal Canadiens (1998–99) | 44–23–11 | W |
| 79 | April 12, 1999 | 2–4 | New York Islanders (1998–99) | 44–24–11 | L |
| 80 | April 14, 1999 | 2–1 | @ Buffalo Sabres (1998–99) | 45–24–11 | W |
| 81 | April 16, 1999 | 3–2 OT | Philadelphia Flyers (1998–99) | 46–24–11 | W |
| 82 | April 17, 1999 | 4–1 | @ Nashville Predators (1998–99) | 47–24–11 | W |

Legend: W Win (2 points) L Loss (0 points) T Tie (1 point)

=== Playoffs ===
1999 Stanley Cup playoffs
Eastern Conference Quarterfinals vs. (8) Pittsburgh Penguins – Penguins win 4–3

| Game | Date | Score | Opponent | Series | Recap |
|---|---|---|---|---|---|
| 1 | April 22, 1999 | 3–1 | Pittsburgh Penguins | Devils lead 1–0 | W |
| 2 | April 24, 1999 | 1–4 | Pittsburgh Penguins | Series tied 1–1 | L |
| 3 | April 25, 1999 | 2–4 | @ Pittsburgh Penguins | Penguins lead 2–1 | L |
| 4 | April 27, 1999 | 4–2 | @ Pittsburgh Penguins | Series tied 2–2 | W |
| 5 | April 30, 1999 | 4–3 | Pittsburgh Penguins | Devils lead 3–2 | W |
| 6 | May 2, 1999 | 2–3 OT | @ Pittsburgh Penguins | Series tied 3–3 | L |
| 7 | May 4, 1999 | 2–4 | Pittsburgh Penguins | Penguins win 4–3 | L |

Legend: W Win L Loss

== Player statistics ==
=== Scoring ===
- Position abbreviations: C = Center; D = Defense; G = Goaltender; LW = Left wing; RW = Right wing
- † = Joined team via a transaction (e.g., trade, waivers, signing) during the season. Stats reflect time with the Devils only.
- ‡ = Left team via a transaction (e.g., trade, waivers, release) during the season. Stats reflect time with the Devils only.

| No. | Player | Pos | Regular season | | | | | | Playoffs | | | | | |
| No. | Player | Pos | GP | G | A | Pts | +/- | PIM | GP | G | A | Pts | +/- | PIM |
|---|---|---|---|---|---|---|---|---|---|---|---|---|---|---|
| 17 | Petr Sykora | RW | 80 | 29 | 43 | 72 | 16 | 22 | 7 | 3 | 3 | 6 | −3 | 4 |
| 16 | Bobby Holik | C | 78 | 27 | 37 | 64 | 16 | 119 | 7 | 0 | 7 | 7 | −1 | 6 |
| 14 | Brian Rolston | C | 82 | 24 | 33 | 57 | 11 | 14 | 7 | 1 | 0 | 1 | −1 | 2 |
| 25 | Jason Arnott | C | 74 | 27 | 27 | 54 | 10 | 79 | 7 | 2 | 2 | 4 | −3 | 4 |
| 26 | Patrik Elias | LW | 74 | 17 | 33 | 50 | 19 | 34 | 7 | 0 | 5 | 5 | 0 | 6 |
| 9 | Brendan Morrison | C | 76 | 13 | 33 | 46 | −4 | 18 | 7 | 0 | 2 | 2 | −1 | 0 |
| 27 | Scott Niedermayer | D | 72 | 11 | 35 | 46 | 16 | 26 | 7 | 1 | 3 | 4 | −5 | 18 |
| 21 | Randy McKay | RW | 70 | 17 | 20 | 37 | 10 | 143 | 7 | 3 | 2 | 5 | 1 | 2 |
| 24 | Lyle Odelein | D | 70 | 5 | 26 | 31 | 6 | 114 | 7 | 0 | 3 | 3 | −1 | 10 |
| 23 | Dave Andreychuk | LW | 52 | 15 | 13 | 28 | 1 | 20 | 4 | 2 | 0 | 2 | 0 | 4 |
| 20 | Jay Pandolfo | LW | 70 | 14 | 13 | 27 | 3 | 10 | 7 | 1 | 0 | 1 | −5 | 0 |
| 8 | Vadim Sharifijanov | LW | 53 | 11 | 16 | 27 | 11 | 28 | 4 | 0 | 0 | 0 | 0 | 0 |
| 4 | Scott Stevens | D | 75 | 5 | 22 | 27 | 29 | 64 | 7 | 2 | 1 | 3 | −2 | 10 |
| 10 | Denis Pederson | C | 76 | 11 | 12 | 23 | −10 | 66 | 3 | 0 | 1 | 1 | 0 | 0 |
| 18 | Sergei Brylin | LW | 47 | 5 | 10 | 15 | 8 | 28 | 5 | 3 | 1 | 4 | 2 | 4 |
| 29 | Krzysztof Oliwa | LW | 64 | 5 | 7 | 12 | 4 | 240 | 1 | 0 | 0 | 0 | 0 | 2 |
| 3 | Ken Daneyko | D | 82 | 2 | 9 | 11 | 27 | 63 | 7 | 0 | 0 | 0 | 3 | 8 |
| 28 | Kevin Dean | D | 62 | 1 | 10 | 11 | 4 | 22 | 7 | 0 | 0 | 0 | −4 | 0 |
| 19 | Bob Carpenter | C | 56 | 2 | 8 | 10 | −3 | 36 | 7 | 0 | 0 | 0 | −1 | 2 |
| 6 | Brad Bombardir | D | 56 | 1 | 7 | 8 | −4 | 16 | 5 | 0 | 0 | 0 | 0 | 0 |
| 2 | Sheldon Souray | D | 70 | 1 | 7 | 8 | 5 | 110 | 2 | 0 | 1 | 1 | 1 | 0 |
| 12 | Sergei Nemchinov† | LW | 10 | 4 | 0 | 4 | 4 | 6 | 4 | 0 | 0 | 0 | −2 | 0 |
| 30 | Martin Brodeur | G | 70 | 0 | 4 | 4 | | 4 | 7 | 0 | 2 | 2 | | 2 |
| 32 | Sasha Lakovic | RW | 16 | 0 | 3 | 3 | 0 | 59 | — | — | — | — | — | — |
| 7 | Ken Sutton | D | 5 | 1 | 0 | 1 | 1 | 0 | — | — | — | — | — | — |
| 11 | John Madden | C | 4 | 0 | 1 | 1 | −2 | 0 | — | — | — | — | — | — |
| 31 | Chris Terreri | G | 12 | 0 | 1 | 1 | | 0 | — | — | — | — | — | — |
| 22 | Scott Daniels | LW | 1 | 0 | 0 | 0 | 0 | 0 | — | — | — | — | — | — |
| 34 | Bryan Muir‡ | D | 1 | 0 | 0 | 0 | 0 | 0 | — | — | — | — | — | — |

=== Goaltending ===
| No. | Player | Regular season | | | | | | | | | | Playoffs | | | | | | | | |
| No. | Player | GP | W | L | T | SA | GA | GAA | SV% | SO | TOI | GP | W | L | SA | GA | GAA | SV% | SO | TOI |
|---|---|---|---|---|---|---|---|---|---|---|---|---|---|---|---|---|---|---|---|---|
| 30 | Martin Brodeur | 70 | 39 | 21 | 10 | 1728 | 162 | 2.29 | .906 | 4 | 4239 | 7 | 3 | 4 | 139 | 20 | 2.82 | .856 | 0 | 425 |
| 31 | Chris Terreri | 12 | 8 | 3 | 1 | 294 | 30 | 2.48 | .898 | 1 | 726 | — | — | — | — | — | — | — | — | — |

== Awards and records ==
=== Awards ===
| Type | Award/honor | Recipient | Ref |
|---|---|---|---|
| League (in-season) | NHL All-Star Game selection | Martin Brodeur (Note: Brodeur was voted to the starting lineup.) | |
| League (in-season) | NHL All-Star Game selection | Robbie Ftorek (coach) | |
| League (in-season) | NHL All-Star Game selection | Bobby Holík | |
| League (in-season) | NHL All-Star Game selection | Scott Stevens | |
| League (in-season) | NHL Rookie of the Month | Vadim Sharifijanov (December) | |
| Team | Devils' Players' Player | Sergei Brylin | |
| Team | Hugh Delano Unsung Hero | Jay Pandolfo | |
| Team | Most Valuable Devil | Martin Brodeur | |
| Team | Three-Star Award | Petr Sykora | |

=== Milestones ===
| Milestone | Player | Date | Ref |
|---|---|---|---|
| 600th assist | Dave Andreychuk | November 3, 1998 | |
| First game | John Madden | January 6, 1999 | |

== Draft picks ==
The Devils' draft picks at the 1998 NHL entry draft at the Marine Midland Arena in Buffalo, New York.

| Rd # | Pick # | Player | Nat | Pos | Team (League) | Notes |
| 1 | 26 | Mike Van Ryn | Canada | D | University of Michigan (CCHA) | |
| 1 | 27 | Scott Gomez | United States | C | Tri-City Americans (WHL) | (Note: The Devils acquired the 1998 first-round pick from Dallas for Carolina's 1998 second-round pick (used on John Erskine) and the Devils' 1998 second-round pick (used on Tyler Bouck) on June 27, 1998.) |
| 2 | 37 | Christian Berglund | Sweden | C | Färjestad BK (Elitserien) | |
| 3 | 82 | Brian Gionta | United States | RW | Boston College (Hockey East) | (Note: The Devils acquired the 1998 third-round pick (originally Pittsburgh's) from Edmonton for the Devils' 1998 fourth-round pick (used on Kristian Antila), 1998 fifth-round pick (used on Oleg Smirnov), and the rights to Fredrik Lindqvist on June 27, 1998. The Devils' original third-round pick was traded to San Jose for Vlastimil Kroupa on August 22, 1997.) |
| 4 | 96 | Mikko Jokela | Finland | D | HIFK (SM-liiga) | (Note: The Devils acquired the 1998 fourth-round pick from Chicago for Reid Simpson on January 8, 1998.) |
| 4 | 105 | Pierre Dagenais | Canada | LW | Rouyn-Noranda Huskies (QMJHL) | (Note: The Devils acquired the 1998 fourth-round pick (originally Boston's) from Los Angeles for Doug Bodger on June 18, 1998. The Devils' original fourth-round pick had been traded to Edmonton (see above note for Brian Gionta).) |
| 5 | 119 | Anton But | Russia | LW | Torpedo-2 Yaroslavl (Russian Superleague) | (Note: The Devils acquired the 1998 fifth-round pick from Vancouver for Peter Zezel on February 5, 1998.) |
| 5 | 143 | Ryan Flinn | Canada | LW | Laval Titan Collège Français (QMJHL) | |
| 6 | 172 | Jacques Lariviere | Canada | LW | Moncton Wildcats (QMJHL) | |
| 7 | 199 | Erik Jensen | United States | W | Des Moines Buccaneers (USHL) | |
| 8 | 227 | Marko Ahosilta | Finland | F | KalPa (SM-liiga) | |
| 9 | 257 | Ryan Held | Canada | W | Kitchener Rangers (OHL) | |

== See also ==
- 1998–99 NHL season
