= 1998–99 Washington Capitals season =

NHL hockey team season

1998–99 Washington Capitals
- Division: 3rd Southeast
- Conference: 12th Eastern
- 1998–99 record: 31–45–6
- Home record: 16–23–2
- Road record: 15–22–4
- Goals for: 200
- Goals against: 218

Team information
- General manager: George McPhee
- Coach: Ron Wilson
- Captain: Dale Hunter (Oct.–Mar.); Vacant (Mar.–Apr.)
- Arena: MCI Center
- Average attendance: 17,281
- Minor league affiliates: Portland Pirates; Hampton Roads Admirals; Quad City Mallards

Team leaders
- Goals: Peter Bondra (31)
- Assists: Adam Oates (42)
- Points: Peter Bondra (55)
- Penalty minutes: Craig Berube (166)
- Plus/minus: Joe Reekie (+11)
- Wins: Olaf Kolzig (26)
- Goals against average: Rick Tabaracci (2.51)

The 1998–99 Washington Capitals season was the Washington Capitals 25th season in the National Hockey League (NHL). The Capitals missed the playoffs for the first time since the 1996–97 season, despite their amazing run to the 1998 Stanley Cup Finals the previous year.

== Regular season ==
The Caps opened the 1998–99 season by raising their "Eastern Conference Champions 1997–1998" banner to the rafters of the MCI Center then shutting out the Mighty Ducks of Anaheim 1–0 with Olaf Kolzig making 29 saves.

On January 16, 1999, Kelly Miller scored just nine seconds into the overtime period to give the Caps a 3–2 road win over the Carolina Hurricanes. It would prove to be the fastest overtime goal scored during the 1998–99 regular season.

On February 3, 1999, the Caps defeated the Tampa Bay Lightning at home by a score of 10–1. Peter Bondra scored four goals in the game. It was the first time that Washington had scored ten goals in a regular-season game since December 17, 1993, when they defeated the Ottawa Senators at home by a score of 11–2.

On March 23, 1999, the Caps traded captain Dale Hunter, Joe Juneau (who had scored the OT goal that led the Caps to the 1998 Stanley Cup Finals), and Craig Berube.

A month after the season finale owner Abe Pollin announced he had sold the team to Ted Leonsis

The Caps were shut out an NHL-high 11 times. They also tied the St. Louis Blues for the fewest power-play opportunities, with just 301. The Caps failed to make the playoffs after playing in the 1998 Stanley Cup Finals. They led the NHL in man-games lost to injury with 511.

=== Final standings ===
Southeast Division
R	CR		GP	W	L	T	GF	GA	PIM	Pts
1	3	**Carolina Hurricanes**	82	34	30	18	210	202	1158	86
2	9	Florida Panthers	82	30	34	18	210	228	1522	78
3	12	Washington Capitals	82	31	45	6	200	218	1381	68
4	14	Tampa Bay Lightning	82	19	54	9	179	292	1316	47

Eastern Conference
R		Div	GP	W	L	T	GF	GA	Pts
**1**	**y – New Jersey Devils**	**ATL**	**82**	**47**	**24**	**11**	**248**	**196**	**105**
**2**	**y – Ottawa Senators**	**NE**	**82**	**44**	**23**	**15**	**239**	**179**	**103**
**3**	**y – Carolina Hurricanes**	**SE**	**82**	**34**	**30**	**18**	**210**	**202**	**86**
**4**	**Toronto Maple Leafs**	**NE**	**82**	**45**	**30**	**7**	**268**	**231**	**97**
**5**	**Philadelphia Flyers**	**ATL**	**82**	**37**	**26**	**19**	**231**	**196**	**93**
**6**	**Boston Bruins**	**NE**	**82**	**39**	**30**	**13**	**214**	**181**	**91**
**7**	**Buffalo Sabres**	**NE**	**82**	**37**	**28**	**17**	**207**	**175**	**91**
**8**	**Pittsburgh Penguins**	**ATL**	**82**	**38**	**30**	**14**	**242**	**225**	**90**
9	Florida Panthers	SE	82	30	34	18	210	228	78
10	New York Rangers	ATL	82	33	38	11	217	227	77
11	Montreal Canadiens	NE	82	32	39	11	184	209	75
12	Washington Capitals	SE	82	31	45	6	200	218	68
13	New York Islanders	ATL	82	24	48	10	194	244	58
14	Tampa Bay Lightning	SE	82	19	54	9	179	292	47

Divisions: ATL – Atlantic Division, NE – Northeast Division, SE – Southeast Division

bold – Qualified for playoffs; y – Won division

== Schedule and results ==
1998–99 regular season
October: 3–3–3 (home: 1–2–2; road: 2–1–1)

Game	Date	Score	Opponent	Record	Recap
1	October 10, 1998	1–0	Mighty Ducks of Anaheim (1998–99)	1–0–0	W
2	October 13, 1998	2–3	Detroit Red Wings (1998–99)	1–1–0	L
3	October 16, 1998	2–2 OT	Montreal Canadiens (1998–99)	1–1–1	T
4	October 18, 1998	4–1	@ Tampa Bay Lightning (1998–99)	2–1–1	W
5	October 21, 1998	1–2	Vancouver Canucks (1998–99)	2–2–1	L
6	October 23, 1998	1–0	@ Buffalo Sabres (1998–99)	3–2–1	W
7	October 24, 1998	2–2 OT	Florida Panthers (1998–99)	3–2–2	T
8	October 28, 1998	2–8	@ Edmonton Oilers (1998–99)	3–3–2	L
9	October 30, 1998	0–0 OT	@ Calgary Flames (1998–99)	3–3–3	T

November: 4–8–0 (home: 2–4–0; road: 2–4–0)

Game	Date	Score	Opponent	Record	Recap
10	November 1, 1998	1–4	@ Vancouver Canucks (1998–99)	3–4–3	L
11	November 4, 1998	2–5	Tampa Bay Lightning (1998–99)	3–5–3	L
12	November 6, 1998	2–3	Carolina Hurricanes (1998–99)	3–6–3	L
13	November 7, 1998	8–5	@ Ottawa Senators (1998–99)	4–6–3	W
14	November 12, 1998	0–2	Buffalo Sabres (1998–99)	4–7–3	L
15	November 14, 1998	5–3	@ New York Islanders (1998–99)	5–7–3	W
16	November 18, 1998	4–1	Toronto Maple Leafs (1998–99)	6–7–3	W
17	November 20, 1998	1–4	Ottawa Senators (1998–99)	6–8–3	L
18	November 21, 1998	4–5 OT	@ Boston Bruins (1998–99)	6–9–3	L
19	November 25, 1998	5–4	Pittsburgh Penguins (1998–99)	7–9–3	W
20	November 27, 1998	0–4	@ Dallas Stars (1998–99)	7–10–3	L
21	November 28, 1998	2–4	@ St. Louis Blues (1998–99)	7–11–3	L

December: 4–8–0 (home: 2–2–0; road: 2–6–0)

Game	Date	Score	Opponent	Record	Recap
22	December 1, 1998	0–4	New Jersey Devils (1998–99)	7–12–3	L
23	December 4, 1998	5–1	New York Islanders (1998–99)	8–12–3	W
24	December 5, 1998	1–2	@ Philadelphia Flyers (1998–99)	8–13–3	L
25	December 9, 1998	1–2	@ Los Angeles Kings (1998–99)	8–14–3	L
26	December 11, 1998	0–1	@ Mighty Ducks of Anaheim (1998–99)	8–15–3	L
27	December 12, 1998	1–2	@ San Jose Sharks (1998–99)	8–16–3	L
28	December 17, 1998	3–1	@ Chicago Blackhawks (1998–99)	9–16–3	W
29	December 19, 1998	0–3	@ Pittsburgh Penguins (1998–99)	9–17–3	L
30	December 23, 1998	4–0	@ Florida Panthers (1998–99)	10–17–3	W
31	December 26, 1998	1–3	@ Nashville Predators (1998–99)	10–18–3	L
32	December 28, 1998	5–1	Boston Bruins (1998–99)	11–18–3	W
33	December 30, 1998	2–3	New Jersey Devils (1998–99)	11–19–3	L

January: 5–7–1 (home: 2–5–0; road: 3–2–1)

Game	Date	Score	Opponent	Record	Recap
34	January 1, 1999	3–4	Ottawa Senators (1998–99)	11–20–3	L
35	January 2, 1999	5–2	@ Toronto Maple Leafs (1998–99)	12–20–3	W
36	January 7, 1999	5–1	New York Rangers (1998–99)	13–20–3	W
37	January 9, 1999	3–2	@ New Jersey Devils (1998–99)	14–20–3	W
38	January 11, 1999	4–3	New York Islanders (1998–99)	15–20–3	W
39	January 13, 1999	0–3	Philadelphia Flyers (1998–99)	15–21–3	L
40	January 15, 1999	0–3	Montreal Canadiens (1998–99)	15–22–3	L
41	January 16, 1999	3–2 OT	@ Carolina Hurricanes (1998–99)	16–22–3	W
42	January 18, 1999	4–4 OT	@ Montreal Canadiens (1998–99)	16–22–4	T
43	January 21, 1999	1–4	@ Philadelphia Flyers (1998–99)	16–23–4	L
44	January 26, 1999	1–4	New York Rangers (1998–99)	16–24–4	L
45	January 29, 1999	3–6	Los Angeles Kings (1998–99)	16–25–4	L
46	January 30, 1999	3–5	@ Toronto Maple Leafs (1998–99)	16–26–4	L

February: 9–4–1 (home: 6–1–0; road: 3–3–1)

Game	Date	Score	Opponent	Record	Recap
47	February 1, 1999	3–1	@ New York Rangers (1998–99)	17–26–4	W
48	February 3, 1999	10–1	Tampa Bay Lightning (1998–99)	18–26–4	W
49	February 5, 1999	4–1	Carolina Hurricanes (1998–99)	19–26–4	W
50	February 7, 1999	3–1	Buffalo Sabres (1998–99)	20–26–4	W
51	February 9, 1999	2–1	@ New York Islanders (1998–99)	21–26–4	W
52	February 12, 1999	3–2	@ New Jersey Devils (1998–99)	22–26–4	W
53	February 13, 1999	1–2	@ Ottawa Senators (1998–99)	22–27–4	L
54	February 15, 1999	3–7	@ Pittsburgh Penguins (1998–99)	22–28–4	L
55	February 18, 1999	2–2 OT	@ Carolina Hurricanes (1998–99)	22–28–5	T
56	February 20, 1999	3–1	San Jose Sharks (1998–99)	23–28–5	W
57	February 22, 1999	4–3	Toronto Maple Leafs (1998–99)	24–28–5	W
58	February 24, 1999	1–2	Phoenix Coyotes (1998–99)	24–29–5	L
59	February 27, 1999	3–4	@ Boston Bruins (1998–99)	24–30–5	L
60	February 28, 1999	4–3	Pittsburgh Penguins (1998–99)	25–30–5	W

March: 4–8–1 (home: 2–6–0; road: 2–2–1)

Game	Date	Score	Opponent	Record	Recap
61	March 2, 1999	8–2	@ Tampa Bay Lightning (1998–99)	26–30–5	W
62	March 4, 1999	2–4	New York Rangers (1998–99)	26–31–5	L
63	March 6, 1999	4–3	Edmonton Oilers (1998–99)	27–31–5	W
64	March 9, 1999	2–3 OT	Colorado Avalanche (1998–99)	27–32–5	L
65	March 11, 1999	1–2	Florida Panthers (1998–99)	27–33–5	L
66	March 13, 1999	4–5 OT	Calgary Flames (1998–99)	27–34–5	L
67	March 15, 1999	1–1 OT	@ New York Rangers (1998–99)	27–34–6	T
68	March 17, 1999	2–1 OT	Dallas Stars (1998–99)	28–34–6	W
69	March 20, 1999	1–0	@ Montreal Canadiens (1998–99)	29–34–6	W
70	March 21, 1999	1–4	Boston Bruins (1998–99)	29–35–6	L
71	March 25, 1999	2–4	@ Phoenix Coyotes (1998–99)	29–36–6	L
72	March 26, 1999	1–3	@ Colorado Avalanche (1998–99)	29–37–6	L
73	March 30, 1999	2–3	Nashville Predators (1998–99)	29–38–6	L

April: 2–7–0 (home: 1–3–0; road: 1–4–0)

Game	Date	Score	Opponent	Record	Recap
74	April 1, 1999	5–3	Florida Panthers (1998–99)	30–38–6	W
75	April 3, 1999	3–4	@ Tampa Bay Lightning (1998–99)	30–39–6	L
76	April 5, 1999	3–0	@ Florida Panthers (1998–99)	31–39–6	W
77	April 7, 1999	2–4	St. Louis Blues (1998–99)	31–40–6	L
78	April 8, 1999	0–1	@ New Jersey Devils (1998–99)	31–41–6	L
79	April 10, 1999	1–2	Philadelphia Flyers (1998–99)	31–42–6	L
80	April 12, 1999	2–4	Chicago Blackhawks (1998–99)	31–43–6	L
81	April 14, 1999	0–3	@ Carolina Hurricanes (1998–99)	31–44–6	L
82	April 18, 1999	0–3	@ Buffalo Sabres (1998–99)	31–45–6	L

Legend: W Win (2 points) L Loss (0 points) T Tie (1 point)

== Player statistics ==
=== Scoring ===
- Position abbreviations: C = Center; D = Defense; G = Goaltender; LW = Left wing; RW = Right wing
- † = Joined team via a transaction (e.g., trade, waivers, signing) during the season. Stats reflect time with the Capitals only.
- ‡ = Left team via a transaction (e.g., trade, waivers, release) during the season. Stats reflect time with the Capitals only.

No.	Player	Pos	Regular season					
No.	Player	Pos	GP	G	A	Pts	+/-	PIM
12	Peter Bondra	RW	66	31	24	55	−1	56
77	Adam Oates	C	59	12	42	54	−1	22
90	Joe Juneau‡	C	63	14	27	41	−3	20
23	Brian Bellows	LW	76	17	19	36	−12	26
13	Andrei Nikolishin	C	73	8	27	35	0	28
55 (Note: Gonchar wore number 4 in his first eight games.)	Sergei Gonchar	D	53	21	10	31	1	57
28	James Black†	LW	75	16	14	30	5	14
6	Calle Johansson	D	67	8	21	29	10	22
22	Steve Konowalchuk	LW	45	12	12	24	0	26
8	Jan Bulis	C	38	7	16	23	3	6
2	Ken Klee	D	78	7	13	20	−9	80
44	Richard Zednik	RW	49	9	8	17	−6	50
15	Dmitri Mironov	D	46	2	14	16	−5	80
34	Jaroslav Svejkovsky	RW	25	6	8	14	−2	12
20	Michal Pivonka	C	36	5	6	11	−6	12
17	Chris Simon	LW	23	3	7	10	−4	48
29	Joe Reekie	D	73	0	10	10	11	68
27	Craig Berube‡	LW	66	5	4	9	−7	166
48	Benoit Gratton	C	16	4	3	7	−1	16
10	Kelly Miller	LW	62	2	5	7	−5	29
19	Brendan Witt	D	54	2	5	7	−6	87
36	Mike Eagles	C	52	4	2	6	−5	50
21	Jeff Toms	C	21	1	5	6	0	2
24	Mark Tinordi	D	48	0	6	6	−6	108
32	Dale Hunter‡	C	50	0	5	5	−7	102
26 (Note: Herr wore number 46 in his first game.)	Matt Herr	C	30	2	2	4	−7	8
18	Trevor Halverson	LW	17	0	4	4	−5	28
39	Enrico Ciccone†	D	43	2	0	2	−6	103
9	Tom Chorske†‡	LW	17	0	2	2	−4	4
37	Olaf Kolzig	G	64	0	2	2		19
41	Patrick Boileau	D	4	0	1	1	−4	2
14	Patrik Augusta†	RW	2	0	0	0	0	0
38	Nolan Baumgartner	D	5	0	0	0	−3	0
1	Martin Brochu	G	2	0	0	0		2
14	Patrice Lefebvre†	RW	3	0	0	0	−2	2
3	Stewart Malgunas	D	10	0	0	0	−5	6
33 (Note: Poapst wore number 39 in his first game.)	Steve Poapst	D	22	0	0	0	−8	8
40	Mike Rosati	G	1	0	0	0		0
4	Brad Shaw†‡	D	4	0	0	0	0	4
31	Rick Tabaracci	G	23	0	0	0		2
4 (Note: Tezikov wore number 42 in his first game.)	Alexei Tezikov†	D	5	0	0	0	−1	0

=== Goaltending ===
No.	Player	Regular season									
No.	Player	GP	W	L	T	SA	GA	GAA	SV%	SO	TOI
37	Olaf Kolzig	64	26	31	3	1538	154	2.58	.900	4	3586
31	Rick Tabaracci	23	4	12	3	530	50	2.51	.906	2	1193
40	Mike Rosati	1	1	0	0	12	0	0.00	1.000	0	28
1	Martin Brochu	2	0	2	0	55	6	3.00	.891	0	120

== Awards and records ==
=== Awards ===
Type	Award/honor	Recipient	Ref
League (in-season)	NHL All-Star Game selection	Peter Bondra	
League (in-season)	NHL Player of the Week	Peter Bondra (February 8)	

=== Milestones ===
Milestone	Player	Date	Ref
First game	Matt Herr	October 10, 1998	
First game	Trevor Halverson	October 13, 1998	
First game	Mike Rosati	November 7, 1998	
First game	Patrice Lefebvre	December 19, 1998	
First game	Alexei Tezikov	April 8, 1999	
First game	Martin Brochu	April 14, 1999	
1,000th game played	Kelly Miller	October 21, 1998	
1,000th point	Brian Bellows	January 2, 1999	

== Draft picks ==
Washington's draft picks at the 1998 NHL entry draft held at the Marine Midland Arena in Buffalo, New York.

Round	#	Player	Nationality	College/Junior/Club team (League)
2	49	Jomar Cruz	Canada	Brandon Wheat Kings (WHL)
3	59	Todd Hornung	Canada	Portland Winter Hawks (WHL)
4	106	Krys Barch	Canada	London Knights (OHL)
4	107	Chris Corrinet	United States	Princeton University (ECAC)
5	118	Mike Siklenka	Canada	Lloydminster Blazers (AJHL)
5	125	Erik Wendell	United States	Maple Grove Senior High School (USHS-MN)
7	179	Nathan Forster	Canada	Seattle Thunderbirds (WHL)
7	193	Rastislav Stana	Slovakia	HC Kosice (Slovakia)
8	220	Mike Farrell	United States	Providence College (Hockey East)
9	251	Blake Evans	Canada	Tri-City Americans (WHL)

== See also ==
- 1998–99 NHL season
