= 1998–99 St. Louis Blues season =

National Hockey League team season

1998–99 St. Louis Blues
- Division: 2nd Central
- Conference: 5th Western
- 1998–99 record: 37–32–13
- Home record: 18–17–6
- Road record: 19–15–7
- Goals for: 237
- Goals against: 209

Team information
- General manager: Larry Pleau
- Coach: Joel Quenneville
- Captain: Chris Pronger
- Arena: Kiel Center
- Average attendance: 18,276
- Minor league affiliates: Worcester IceCats; Peoria Rivermen

Team leaders
- Goals: Pavol Demitra (37)
- Assists: Pavol Demitra (52)
- Points: Pavol Demitra (89)
- Penalty minutes: Tony Twist (149)
- Plus/minus: Al MacInnis (+33)
- Wins: Grant Fuhr (16)
- Goals against average: Jamie McLennan (2.38)

The 1998–99 St. Louis Blues season was the team's 32nd season in the National Hockey League (NHL). Despite the loss of Brett Hull during the preceding off-season, the Blues made the Stanley Cup playoffs for the 20th-straight season after finishing in second place with a record of 37–32–13.

== Off-season ==
Realignment came, as the NHL went from four to six divisions. Carolina, Florida, Tampa Bay and Washington were grouped in the Eastern Conference's new Southeast Division and Calgary, Colorado, Edmonton and Vancouver moved into the new Northwest Division in the Western Conference.

== Regular season ==
The Blues made the playoffs for the 20th straight season by finishing in 2nd place with a record of 37–32–13. Al MacInnis won the Norris trophy as the best defenceman in the NHL, while Pavol Demitra scored 37 goals. In the playoffs, the Blues initially trailed the Phoenix Coyotes 3 games to 1. The Blues rallied and took the series in 7 games. However, in the second round, the Blues were knocked off again by the Dallas Stars led by Brett Hull in 6 games. Hull would go on to score the Stanley Cup clinching goal for the Stars.

The Blues tied the Washington Capitals for the fewest power-play opportunities during the regular season, with just 301. They also tied the Dallas Stars and San Jose Sharks for the fewest short-handed goals allowed, with 4.

=== Season standings ===
Central Division
| R | CR | | GP | W | L | T | GF | GA | PIM | Pts |
|---|---|---|---|---|---|---|---|---|---|---|
| 1 | 3 | **Detroit Red Wings** | 82 | 43 | 32 | 7 | 245 | 202 | 1202 | 93 |
| 2 | 5 | **St. Louis Blues** | 82 | 37 | 32 | 13 | 237 | 209 | 1308 | 87 |
| 3 | 10 | Chicago Blackhawks | 82 | 29 | 41 | 12 | 202 | 248 | 1807 | 70 |
| 4 | 12 | Nashville Predators | 82 | 28 | 47 | 7 | 190 | 261 | 1420 | 63 |

Western Conference
| R | | Div | GP | W | L | T | GF | GA | Pts |
|---|---|---|---|---|---|---|---|---|---|
| **1** | **p – Dallas Stars** | **PAC** | **82** | **51** | **19** | **12** | **236** | **168** | **114** |
| **2** | **y – Colorado Avalanche** | **NW** | **82** | **44** | **28** | **10** | **239** | **205** | **98** |
| **3** | **y – Detroit Red Wings** | **CEN** | **82** | **43** | **32** | **7** | **245** | **202** | **93** |
| **4** | **Phoenix Coyotes** | **PAC** | **82** | **39** | **31** | **12** | **205** | **197** | **90** |
| **5** | **St. Louis Blues** | **CEN** | **82** | **37** | **32** | **13** | **237** | **209** | **87** |
| **6** | **Mighty Ducks of Anaheim** | **PAC** | **82** | **35** | **34** | **13** | **215** | **206** | **83** |
| **7** | **San Jose Sharks** | **PAC** | **82** | **31** | **33** | **18** | **196** | **191** | **80** |
| **8** | **Edmonton Oilers** | **NW** | **82** | **33** | **37** | **12** | **230** | **226** | **78** |
| 9 | Calgary Flames | NW | 82 | 30 | 40 | 12 | 211 | 234 | 72 |
| 10 | Chicago Blackhawks | CEN | 82 | 29 | 41 | 12 | 202 | 248 | 70 |
| 11 | Los Angeles Kings | PAC | 82 | 32 | 45 | 5 | 189 | 222 | 69 |
| 12 | Nashville Predators | CEN | 82 | 28 | 47 | 7 | 190 | 261 | 63 |
| 13 | Vancouver Canucks | NW | 82 | 23 | 47 | 12 | 192 | 258 | 58 |

Divisions: CEN – Central, PAC – Pacific, NW – Northwest

bold – Qualified for playoffs; p – Won Presidents' Trophy; y – Won division

== Schedule and results ==
=== Regular season ===
1998–99 regular season
October: 4–3–2 (home: 2–1–1; road: 2–2–1)

| Game | Date | Score | Opponent | Record | Recap |
|---|---|---|---|---|---|
| 1 | October 10, 1998 | 3–3 OT | @ Boston Bruins (1998–99) | 0–0–1 | T |
| 2 | October 12, 1998 | 4–2 | @ New York Rangers (1998–99) | 1–0–1 | W |
| 3 | October 16, 1998 | 1–4 | @ Detroit Red Wings (1998–99) | 1–1–1 | L |
| 4 | October 17, 1998 | 0–1 | New York Islanders (1998–99) | 1–2–1 | L |
| 5 | October 22, 1998 | 5–3 | @ Ottawa Senators (1998–99) | 2–2–1 | W |
| 6 | October 24, 1998 | 4–3 | Calgary Flames (1998–99) | 3–2–1 | W |
| 7 | October 27, 1998 | 1–2 | @ Philadelphia Flyers (1998–99) | 3–3–1 | L |
| 8 | October 29, 1998 | 3–1 | Detroit Red Wings (1998–99) | 4–3–1 | W |
| 9 | October 31, 1998 | 2–2 OT | Mighty Ducks of Anaheim (1998–99) | 4–3–2 | T |

November: 5–3–3 (home: 4–1–1; road: 1–2–2)

| Game | Date | Score | Opponent | Record | Recap |
|---|---|---|---|---|---|
| 10 | November 4, 1998 | 3–1 | @ Mighty Ducks of Anaheim (1998–99) | 5–3–2 | W |
| 11 | November 5, 1998 | 2–2 OT | @ Los Angeles Kings (1998–99) | 5–3–3 | T |
| 12 | November 7, 1998 | 2–2 OT | @ San Jose Sharks (1998–99) | 5–3–4 | T |
| 13 | November 10, 1998 | 5–2 | Chicago Blackhawks (1998–99) | 6–3–4 | W |
| 14 | November 11, 1998 | 2–6 | @ Detroit Red Wings (1998–99) | 6–4–4 | L |
| 15 | November 14, 1998 | 5–1 | Nashville Predators (1998–99) | 7–4–4 | W |
| 16 | November 19, 1998 | 2–3 | @ Nashville Predators (1998–99) | 7–5–4 | L |
| 17 | November 21, 1998 | 3–3 OT | Dallas Stars (1998–99) | 7–5–5 | T |
| 18 | November 24, 1998 | 4–0 | Nashville Predators (1998–99) | 8–5–5 | W |
| 19 | November 27, 1998 | 2–4 | San Jose Sharks (1998–99) | 8–6–5 | L |
| 20 | November 28, 1998 | 4–2 | Washington Capitals (1998–99) | 9–6–5 | W |

December: 3–5–4 (home: 3–2–1; road: 0–3–3)

| Game | Date | Score | Opponent | Record | Recap |
|---|---|---|---|---|---|
| 21 | December 4, 1998 | 0–2 | @ Colorado Avalanche (1998–99) | 9–7–5 | L |
| 22 | December 5, 1998 | 1–3 | Colorado Avalanche (1998–99) | 9–8–5 | L |
| 23 | December 8, 1998 | 2–2 OT | Buffalo Sabres (1998–99) | 9–8–6 | T |
| 24 | December 12, 1998 | 3–4 | Pittsburgh Penguins (1998–99) | 9–9–6 | L |
| 25 | December 14, 1998 | 0–0 OT | @ Colorado Avalanche (1998–99) | 9–9–7 | T |
| 26 | December 15, 1998 | 3–7 | @ Dallas Stars (1998–99) | 9–10–7 | L |
| 27 | December 17, 1998 | 3–2 | Phoenix Coyotes (1998–99) | 10–10–7 | W |
| 28 | December 19, 1998 | 5–2 | Los Angeles Kings (1998–99) | 11–10–7 | W |
| 29 | December 22, 1998 | 3–3 OT | @ New York Islanders (1998–99) | 11–10–8 | T |
| 30 | December 23, 1998 | 2–4 | @ New Jersey Devils (1998–99) | 11–11–8 | L |
| 31 | December 26, 1998 | 4–3 | Detroit Red Wings (1998–99) | 12–11–8 | W |
| 32 | December 28, 1998 | 4–4 OT | @ Detroit Red Wings (1998–99) | 12–11–9 | T |

January: 6–7–0 (home: 2–2–0; road: 4–5–0)

| Game | Date | Score | Opponent | Record | Recap |
|---|---|---|---|---|---|
| 33 | January 1, 1999 | 6–5 | @ Nashville Predators (1998–99) | 13–11–9 | W |
| 34 | January 2, 1999 | 0–1 | New York Rangers (1998–99) | 13–12–9 | L |
| 35 | January 4, 1999 | 4–0 | Vancouver Canucks (1998–99) | 14–12–9 | W |
| 36 | January 7, 1999 | 4–2 | Chicago Blackhawks (1998–99) | 15–12–9 | W |
| 37 | January 9, 1999 | 1–2 | @ Pittsburgh Penguins (1998–99) | 15–13–9 | L |
| 38 | January 11, 1999 | 1–3 | @ Montreal Canadiens (1998–99) | 15–14–9 | L |
| 39 | January 13, 1999 | 4–2 | @ Buffalo Sabres (1998–99) | 16–14–9 | W |
| 40 | January 16, 1999 | 0–2 | @ Colorado Avalanche (1998–99) | 16–15–9 | L |
| 41 | January 19, 1999 | 2–4 | @ Phoenix Coyotes (1998–99) | 16–16–9 | L |
| 42 | January 21, 1999 | 2–4 | Toronto Maple Leafs (1998–99) | 16–17–9 | L |
| 43 | January 26, 1999 | 3–0 | @ San Jose Sharks (1998–99) | 17–17–9 | W |
| 44 | January 28, 1999 | 4–2 | @ Vancouver Canucks (1998–99) | 18–17–9 | W |
| 45 | January 30, 1999 | 3–4 | @ Calgary Flames (1998–99) | 18–18–9 | L |

February: 7–6–1 (home: 2–6–1; road: 5–0–0)

| Game | Date | Score | Opponent | Record | Recap |
|---|---|---|---|---|---|
| 46 | February 1, 1999 | 4–3 OT | @ Edmonton Oilers (1998–99) | 19–18–9 | W |
| 47 | February 4, 1999 | 0–2 | New Jersey Devils (1998–99) | 19–19–9 | L |
| 48 | February 6, 1999 | 3–4 | Mighty Ducks of Anaheim (1998–99) | 19–20–9 | L |
| 49 | February 8, 1999 | 5–4 | @ Florida Panthers (1998–99) | 20–20–9 | W |
| 50 | February 10, 1999 | 5–4 | @ Tampa Bay Lightning (1998–99) | 21–20–9 | W |
| 51 | February 11, 1999 | 1–5 | San Jose Sharks (1998–99) | 21–21–9 | L |
| 52 | February 13, 1999 | 2–3 | Edmonton Oilers (1998–99) | 21–22–9 | L |
| 53 | February 15, 1999 | 8–1 | Vancouver Canucks (1998–99) | 22–22–9 | W |
| 54 | February 18, 1999 | 0–0 OT | Florida Panthers (1998–99) | 22–22–10 | T |
| 55 | February 20, 1999 | 3–4 | Nashville Predators (1998–99) | 22–23–10 | L |
| 56 | February 22, 1999 | 5–1 | Los Angeles Kings (1998–99) | 23–23–10 | W |
| 57 | February 24, 1999 | 1–3 | Chicago Blackhawks (1998–99) | 23–24–10 | L |
| 58 | February 26, 1999 | 4–2 | @ Calgary Flames (1998–99) | 24–24–10 | W |
| 59 | February 28, 1999 | 3–1 | @ Chicago Blackhawks (1998–99) | 25–24–10 | W |

March: 6–7–1 (home: 3–4–1; road: 3–3–0)

| Game | Date | Score | Opponent | Record | Recap |
|---|---|---|---|---|---|
| 60 | March 2, 1999 | 5–1 | @ Nashville Predators (1998–99) | 26–24–10 | W |
| 61 | March 4, 1999 | 0–4 | Toronto Maple Leafs (1998–99) | 26–25–10 | L |
| 62 | March 7, 1999 | 3–4 | @ Dallas Stars (1998–99) | 26–26–10 | L |
| 63 | March 9, 1999 | 4–7 | Calgary Flames (1998–99) | 26–27–10 | L |
| 64 | March 11, 1999 | 0–3 | Montreal Canadiens (1998–99) | 26–28–10 | L |
| 65 | March 13, 1999 | 6–4 | Edmonton Oilers (1998–99) | 27–28–10 | W |
| 66 | March 14, 1999 | 5–2 | @ Chicago Blackhawks (1998–99) | 28–28–10 | W |
| 67 | March 16, 1999 | 5–2 | Philadelphia Flyers (1998–99) | 29–28–10 | W |
| 68 | March 18, 1999 | 2–2 OT | Phoenix Coyotes (1998–99) | 29–28–11 | T |
| 69 | March 20, 1999 | 2–3 | Ottawa Senators (1998–99) | 29–29–11 | L |
| 70 | March 22, 1999 | 5–2 | Carolina Hurricanes (1998–99) | 30–29–11 | W |
| 71 | March 25, 1999 | 4–1 | @ Vancouver Canucks (1998–99) | 31–29–11 | W |
| 72 | March 26, 1999 | 1–2 | @ Edmonton Oilers (1998–99) | 31–30–11 | L |
| 73 | March 28, 1999 | 1–3 | @ Chicago Blackhawks (1998–99) | 31–31–11 | L |

April: 6–1–2 (home: 2–1–1; road: 4–0–1)

| Game | Date | Score | Opponent | Record | Recap |
|---|---|---|---|---|---|
| 74 | April 1, 1999 | 3–0 | Tampa Bay Lightning (1998–99) | 32–31–11 | W |
| 75 | April 3, 1999 | 5–2 | Dallas Stars (1998–99) | 33–31–11 | W |
| 76 | April 5, 1999 | 2–2 OT | @ Toronto Maple Leafs (1998–99) | 33–31–12 | T |
| 77 | April 7, 1999 | 4–2 | @ Washington Capitals (1998–99) | 34–31–12 | W |
| 78 | April 9, 1999 | 1–1 OT | Detroit Red Wings (1998–99) | 34–31–13 | T |
| 79 | April 11, 1999 | 2–4 | Colorado Avalanche (1998–99) | 34–32–13 | L |
| 80 | April 14, 1999 | 3–1 | @ Mighty Ducks of Anaheim (1998–99) | 35–32–13 | W |
| 81 | April 15, 1999 | 6–4 | @ Phoenix Coyotes (1998–99) | 36–32–13 | W |
| 82 | April 18, 1999 | 3–2 | @ Los Angeles Kings (1998–99) | 37–32–13 | W |

Legend: W Win (2 points) L Loss (0 points) T Tie (1 point)

=== Playoffs ===
1999 Stanley Cup playoffs
Western Conference Quarterfinals vs. (4) Phoenix Coyotes: Blues win 4–3

| Game | Date | Score | Opponent | Series | Recap |
|---|---|---|---|---|---|
| 1 | April 22, 1999 | 3–1 | @ Phoenix Coyotes | Blues lead 1–0 | W |
| 2 | April 24, 1999 | 3–4 OT | @ Phoenix Coyotes | Series tied 1–1 | L |
| 3 | April 25, 1999 | 4–5 | Phoenix Coyotes | Coyotes lead 2–1 | L |
| 4 | April 27, 1999 | 1–2 | Phoenix Coyotes | Coyotes lead 3–1 | L |
| 5 | April 30, 1999 | 2–1 OT | @ Phoenix Coyotes | Coyotes lead 3–2 | W |
| 6 | May 2, 1999 | 5–3 | Phoenix Coyotes | Series tied 3–3 | W |
| 7 | May 4, 1999 | 1–0 OT | @ Phoenix Coyotes | Blues win 4–3 | W |

Western Conference Semifinals vs. (1) Dallas Stars: Stars win 4–2

| Game | Date | Score | Opponent | Series | Recap |
|---|---|---|---|---|---|
| 1 | May 6, 1999 | 0–3 | @ Dallas Stars | Stars lead 1–0 | L |
| 2 | May 8, 1999 | 4–5 OT | @ Dallas Stars | Stars lead 2–0 | L |
| 3 | May 10, 1999 | 3–2 OT | Dallas Stars | Stars lead 2–1 | W |
| 4 | May 12, 1999 | 3–2 OT | Dallas Stars | Series tied 2–2 | W |
| 5 | May 15, 1999 | 1–3 | @ Dallas Stars | Stars lead 3–2 | L |
| 6 | May 17, 1999 | 1–2 OT | Dallas Stars | Stars win 4–2 | L |

Legend: W Win L Loss

== Player statistics ==
=== Scoring ===
- Position abbreviations: C = Center; D = Defense; G = Goaltender; LW = Left wing; RW = Right wing
- † = Joined team via a transaction (e.g., trade, waivers, signing) during the season. Stats reflect time with the Blues only.
- ‡ = Left team via a transaction (e.g., trade, waivers, release) during the season. Stats reflect time with the Blues only.

| No. | Player | Pos | Regular season | | | | | | Playoffs | | | | | |
| No. | Player | Pos | GP | G | A | Pts | +/- | PIM | GP | G | A | Pts | +/- | PIM |
|---|---|---|---|---|---|---|---|---|---|---|---|---|---|---|
| 38 | Pavol Demitra | LW | 82 | 37 | 52 | 89 | 13 | 16 | 13 | 5 | 4 | 9 | −5 | 4 |
| 77 | Pierre Turgeon | C | 67 | 31 | 34 | 65 | 4 | 36 | 13 | 4 | 9 | 13 | 3 | 6 |
| 2 | Al MacInnis | D | 82 | 20 | 42 | 62 | 33 | 70 | 13 | 4 | 8 | 12 | −2 | 20 |
| 48 | Scott Young | RW | 75 | 24 | 28 | 52 | 8 | 27 | 13 | 4 | 7 | 11 | 2 | 10 |
| 44 | Chris Pronger | D | 67 | 13 | 33 | 46 | 3 | 113 | 13 | 1 | 4 | 5 | −2 | 28 |
| 33 | Scott Pellerin | LW | 80 | 20 | 21 | 41 | 1 | 42 | 8 | 1 | 0 | 1 | −2 | 4 |
| 22 | Craig Conroy | C | 69 | 14 | 25 | 39 | 14 | 38 | 13 | 2 | 1 | 3 | −3 | 6 |
| 32 | Mike Eastwood | C | 82 | 9 | 21 | 30 | 6 | 36 | 13 | 1 | 1 | 2 | 2 | 6 |
| 25 | Pascal Rheaume | C | 60 | 9 | 18 | 27 | 10 | 24 | 5 | 1 | 0 | 1 | 1 | 4 |
| 27 | Terry Yake | C | 60 | 9 | 18 | 27 | −9 | 34 | 13 | 1 | 2 | 3 | −3 | 14 |
| 10 | Jim Campbell | RW | 55 | 4 | 21 | 25 | −8 | 41 | — | — | — | — | — | — |
| 34 | Michel Picard | LW | 45 | 11 | 11 | 22 | 5 | 16 | 5 | 0 | 0 | 0 | −3 | 2 |
| 56 | Lubos Bartecko | LW | 32 | 5 | 11 | 16 | 4 | 6 | 5 | 0 | 0 | 0 | −3 | 2 |
| 26 | Michal Handzus | C | 66 | 4 | 12 | 16 | −9 | 30 | 11 | 0 | 2 | 2 | 0 | 8 |
| 7 | Ricard Persson | D | 54 | 1 | 12 | 13 | 4 | 94 | 13 | 0 | 3 | 3 | −1 | 17 |
| 14 | Geoff Courtnall | LW | 24 | 5 | 7 | 12 | 2 | 28 | 13 | 2 | 4 | 6 | −4 | 10 |
| 39 | Kelly Chase | RW | 45 | 3 | 7 | 10 | 2 | 143 | — | — | — | — | — | — |
| 15 | Marty Reasoner | C | 22 | 3 | 7 | 10 | 2 | 8 | — | — | — | — | — | — |
| 21 | Jamal Mayers | RW | 34 | 4 | 5 | 9 | −3 | 40 | 11 | 0 | 1 | 1 | −2 | 8 |
| 18 | Tony Twist | LW | 63 | 2 | 6 | 8 | 0 | 149 | 1 | 0 | 0 | 0 | −1 | 0 |
| 6 | Jamie Rivers | D | 76 | 2 | 5 | 7 | −3 | 47 | 9 | 1 | 1 | 2 | −2 | 2 |
| 5 | Todd Gill‡ | D | 28 | 2 | 3 | 5 | −6 | 16 | — | — | — | — | — | — |
| 23 | Blair Atcheynum† | RW | 12 | 2 | 2 | 4 | 2 | 2 | 13 | 1 | 3 | 4 | 2 | 6 |
| 36 | Bryan Helmer† | D | 29 | 0 | 4 | 4 | 3 | 19 | — | — | — | — | — | — |
| 37 | Jeff Finley† | D | 30 | 1 | 2 | 3 | 12 | 20 | 13 | 1 | 2 | 3 | −4 | 8 |
| 4 | Marc Bergevin | D | 52 | 1 | 1 | 2 | −14 | 99 | — | — | — | — | — | — |
| 19 | Chris McAlpine | D | 51 | 1 | 1 | 2 | −10 | 50 | 13 | 0 | 0 | 0 | 0 | 2 |
| 35 | Jim Carey† | G | 4 | 0 | 0 | 0 | | 0 | — | — | — | — | — | — |
| 42 | Rory Fitzpatrick | D | 1 | 0 | 0 | 0 | −3 | 2 | — | — | — | — | — | — |
| 31 | Grant Fuhr | G | 39 | 0 | 0 | 0 | | 12 | 13 | 0 | 1 | 1 | | 2 |
| 55 | Jochen Hecht | LW | 3 | 0 | 0 | 0 | −2 | 0 | 5 | 2 | 0 | 2 | 4 | 0 |
| 1 | Brent Johnson | G | 6 | 0 | 0 | 0 | | 0 | — | — | — | — | — | — |
| 29 | Jamie McLennan | G | 33 | 0 | 0 | 0 | | 0 | 1 | 0 | 0 | 0 | | 6 |
| 9 | Tyson Nash | LW | 2 | 0 | 0 | 0 | −1 | 5 | 1 | 0 | 0 | 0 | −3 | 2 |
| 30 | Rich Parent | G | 10 | 0 | 0 | 0 | | 2 | — | — | — | — | — | — |
| 20 | Rudy Poeschek | D | 16 | 0 | 0 | 0 | 0 | 33 | — | — | — | — | — | — |
| 28 | Brad Shaw† | D | 12 | 0 | 0 | 0 | 0 | 4 | 4 | 0 | 0 | 0 | 2 | 0 |

=== Goaltending ===
- † = Joined team via a transaction (e.g., trade, waivers, signing) during the season. Stats reflect time with the Blues only.

| No. | Player | Regular season | | | | | | | | | | Playoffs | | | | | | | | |
| No. | Player | GP | W | L | T | SA | GA | GAA | SV% | SO | TOI | GP | W | L | SA | GA | GAA | SV% | SO | TOI |
|---|---|---|---|---|---|---|---|---|---|---|---|---|---|---|---|---|---|---|---|---|
| 31 | Grant Fuhr | 39 | 16 | 11 | 8 | 827 | 89 | 2.44 | .892 | 2 | 2193 | 13 | 6 | 6 | 305 | 31 | 2.35 | .898 | 1 | 790 |
| 29 | Jamie McLennan | 33 | 13 | 14 | 4 | 640 | 70 | 2.38 | .891 | 3 | 1763 | 1 | 0 | 1 | 7 | 0 | 0.00 | 1.000 | 0 | 37 |
| 30 | Rich Parent | 10 | 4 | 3 | 1 | 193 | 22 | 2.54 | .886 | 1 | 519 | — | — | — | — | — | — | — | — | — |
| 1 | Brent Johnson | 6 | 3 | 2 | 0 | 127 | 10 | 2.10 | .921 | 0 | 286 | — | — | — | — | — | — | — | — | — |
| 35 | Jim Carey† | 4 | 1 | 2 | 0 | 76 | 13 | 3.86 | .829 | 0 | 202 | — | — | — | — | — | — | — | — | — |

== Awards and records ==
=== Awards ===
| Type | Award/honor | Recipient | Ref |
|---|---|---|---|
| League (annual) | James Norris Memorial Trophy | Al MacInnis | |
| League (annual) | NHL First All-Star Team | Al MacInnis (Defense) | |
| League (in-season) | NHL All-Star Game selection | Pavol Demitra | |
| League (in-season) | NHL All-Star Game selection | Al MacInnis (Note: MacInnis was voted to the starting lineup.) | |
| League (in-season) | NHL All-Star Game selection | Chris Pronger | |

=== Milestones ===
| Milestone | Player | Date | Ref |
|---|---|---|---|
| First game | Michal Handzus | October 10, 1998 | |
| First game | Marty Reasoner | October 10, 1998 | |
| First game | Lubos Bartecko | November 28, 1998 | |
| First game | Jochen Hecht | January 13, 1999 | |
| First game | Brent Johnson | February 15, 1999 | |
| First game | Tyson Nash | April 3, 1999 | |
| 25th shutout | Grant Fuhr | April 1, 1999 | |
| 600th assist | Pierre Turgeon | April 14, 1999 | |

== Draft picks ==
St. Louis's draft picks at the 1998 NHL entry draft held at the Marine Midland Arena in Buffalo, New York.

| Round | # | Player | Nationality | College/Junior/Club team (League) |
|---|---|---|---|---|
| 1 | 24 | Christian Backman | Sweden | Västra Frölunda HC (Sweden) |
| 2 | 41 | Maxym Linnik | Ukraine | St. Thomas Stars (GOJHL) |
| 3 | 83 | Matt Walker | Canada | Portland Winter Hawks (WHL) |
| 6 | 157 | Brad Voth | Canada | Medicine Hat Tigers (WHL) |
| 6 | 170 | Andrei Troschinsky | Kazakhstan | Torpedo Ust-Kamenogorsk (Kazakhstan) |
| 7 | 197 | Brad Twordik | Canada | Brandon Wheat Kings (WHL) |
| 8 | 225 | Yevgeni Pastukh | Ukraine | Khimik Voskresensk (Russia) |
| 9 | 255 | John Pohl | United States | University of Minnesota (CCHA) |

== See also ==
- 1998–99 NHL season
