= 1998–99 Detroit Red Wings season =

National Hockey League team season

1998–99 Detroit Red Wings
- Central Division champions
- Division: 1st Central
- Conference: 3rd Western
- 1998–99 record: 43–32–7
- Home record: 27–12–2
- Road record: 16–20–5
- Goals for: 245
- Goals against: 202

Team information
- General manager: Ken Holland
- Coach: Scotty Bowman
- Captain: Steve Yzerman
- Alternate captains: Nicklas Lidstrom; Brendan Shanahan
- Arena: Joe Louis Arena
- Average attendance: 19,983
- Minor league affiliates: Adirondack Red Wings; Toledo Storm

Team leaders
- Goals: Brendan Shanahan (31)
- Assists: Igor Larionov (49)
- Points: Steve Yzerman (74)
- Penalty minutes: Martin Lapointe (141)
- Plus/minus: Larry Murphy (+21)
- Wins: Chris Osgood (34)
- Goals against average: Norm Maracle (2.27)

The 1998–99 Detroit Red Wings season was Detroit's 73rd season of operation in the National Hockey League (NHL). They entered the season as the two-time defending Stanley Cup champions.

== Regular season ==
=== Final standings ===
Central Division
R	CR		GP	W	L	T	GF	GA	PIM	Pts
1	3	**Detroit Red Wings**	82	43	32	7	245	202	1202	93
2	5	**St. Louis Blues**	82	37	32	13	237	209	1308	87
3	10	Chicago Blackhawks	82	29	41	12	202	248	1807	70
4	12	Nashville Predators	82	28	47	7	190	261	1420	63

Western Conference
R		Div	GP	W	L	T	GF	GA	Pts
**1**	**p – Dallas Stars**	**PAC**	**82**	**51**	**19**	**12**	**236**	**168**	**114**
**2**	**y – Colorado Avalanche**	**NW**	**82**	**44**	**28**	**10**	**239**	**205**	**98**
**3**	**y – Detroit Red Wings**	**CEN**	**82**	**43**	**32**	**7**	**245**	**202**	**93**
**4**	**Phoenix Coyotes**	**PAC**	**82**	**39**	**31**	**12**	**205**	**197**	**90**
**5**	**St. Louis Blues**	**CEN**	**82**	**37**	**32**	**13**	**237**	**209**	**87**
**6**	**Mighty Ducks of Anaheim**	**PAC**	**82**	**35**	**34**	**13**	**215**	**206**	**83**
**7**	**San Jose Sharks**	**PAC**	**82**	**31**	**33**	**18**	**196**	**191**	**80**
**8**	**Edmonton Oilers**	**NW**	**82**	**33**	**37**	**12**	**230**	**226**	**78**
9	Calgary Flames	NW	82	30	40	12	211	234	72
10	Chicago Blackhawks	CEN	82	29	41	12	202	248	70
11	Los Angeles Kings	PAC	82	32	45	5	189	222	69
12	Nashville Predators	CEN	82	28	47	7	190	261	63
13	Vancouver Canucks	NW	82	23	47	12	192	258	58

Divisions: CEN – Central, PAC – Pacific, NW – Northwest

bold – Qualified for playoffs; p – Won Presidents' Trophy; y – Won division

== Playoffs ==
The Red Wings would enter the 1999 Stanley Cup Playoffs against the Mighty Ducks of Anaheim, and the series proved to be no contest. Detroit would sweep the Ducks in four games, setting up a rematch with their arch-rival Colorado Avalanche. Despite Detroit winning the first two games, they would go on to lose the next four consecutively, and were eliminated by the Avalanche.

== Schedule and results ==
=== Regular season ===
1998–99 regular season
October: 6–4–0 (home: 3–1–0; road: 3–3–0)

Game	Date	Score	Opponent	Record	Recap
1	October 10, 1998	1–2	@ Toronto Maple Leafs (1998–99)	0–1–0	L
2	October 13, 1998	3–2	@ Washington Capitals (1998–99)	1–1–0	W
3	October 16, 1998	4–1	St. Louis Blues (1998–99)	2–1–0	W
4	October 18, 1998	2–0	Calgary Flames (1998–99)	3–1–0	W
5	October 21, 1998	5–2	Nashville Predators (1998–99)	4–1–0	W
6	October 23, 1998	3–5	Toronto Maple Leafs (1998–99)	4–2–0	L
7	October 24, 1998	3–0	@ Montreal Canadiens (1998–99)	5–2–0	W
8	October 28, 1998	7–2	@ Florida Panthers (1998–99)	6–2–0	W
9	October 29, 1998	1–3	@ St. Louis Blues (1998–99)	6–3–0	L
10	October 31, 1998	2–3	@ Dallas Stars (1998–99)	6–4–0	L

November: 7–4–0 (home: 4–2–0; road: 3–2–0)

Game	Date	Score	Opponent	Record	Recap
11	November 3, 1998	2–5	Calgary Flames (1998–99)	6–5–0	L
12	November 6, 1998	1–3	@ Phoenix Coyotes (1998–99)	6–6–0	L
13	November 8, 1998	3–2	@ Mighty Ducks of Anaheim (1998–99)	7–6–0	W
14	November 11, 1998	6–2	St. Louis Blues (1998–99)	8–6–0	W
15	November 13, 1998	1–5	Dallas Stars (1998–99)	8–7–0	L
16	November 16, 1998	3–5	@ Calgary Flames (1998–99)	8–8–0	L
17	November 18, 1998	6–2	@ Edmonton Oilers (1998–99)	9–8–0	W
18	November 21, 1998	4–2	@ Vancouver Canucks (1998–99)	10–8–0	W
19	November 25, 1998	5–2	Mighty Ducks of Anaheim (1998–99)	11–8–0	W
20	November 27, 1998	7–1	Vancouver Canucks (1998–99)	12–8–0	W
21	November 29, 1998	4–1	San Jose Sharks (1998–99)	13–8–0	W

December: 4–8–2 (home: 3–3–1; road: 1–5–1)

Game	Date	Score	Opponent	Record	Recap
22	December 2, 1998	2–4	@ Colorado Avalanche (1998–99)	13–9–0	L
23	December 4, 1998	2–2 OT	@ San Jose Sharks (1998–99)	13–9–1	T
24	December 5, 1998	4–3	@ Los Angeles Kings (1998–99)	14–9–1	W
25	December 8, 1998	3–2	Chicago Blackhawks (1998–99)	15–9–1	W
26	December 11, 1998	3–2	Edmonton Oilers (1998–99)	16–9–1	W
27	December 12, 1998	0–3	@ Carolina Hurricanes (1998–99)	16–10–1	L
28	December 16, 1998	5–3	Boston Bruins (1998–99)	17–10–1	W
29	December 18, 1998	1–3	Dallas Stars (1998–99)	17–11–1	L
30	December 19, 1998	1–4	@ Boston Bruins (1998–99)	17–12–1	L
31	December 22, 1998	2–6	Phoenix Coyotes (1998–99)	17–13–1	L
32	December 23, 1998	3–5	@ Nashville Predators (1998–99)	17–14–1	L
33	December 26, 1998	3–4	@ St. Louis Blues (1998–99)	17–15–1	L
34	December 28, 1998	4–4 OT	St. Louis Blues (1998–99)	17–15–2	T
35	December 31, 1998	2–4	Toronto Maple Leafs (1998–99)	17–16–2	L

January: 7–5–1 (home: 5–2–0; road: 2–3–1)

Game	Date	Score	Opponent	Record	Recap
36	January 2, 1999	5–2	Chicago Blackhawks (1998–99)	18–16–2	W
37	January 3, 1999	3–1	@ Chicago Blackhawks (1998–99)	19–16–2	W
38	January 6, 1999	0–2	Ottawa Senators (1998–99)	19–17–2	L
39	January 9, 1999	3–2	Colorado Avalanche (1998–99)	20–17–2	W
40	January 10, 1999	1–4	@ Ottawa Senators (1998–99)	20–18–2	L
41	January 12, 1999	5–1	Montreal Canadiens (1998–99)	21–18–2	W
42	January 14, 1999	2–1 OT	Nashville Predators (1998–99)	22–18–2	W
43	January 16, 1999	2–2 OT	@ Vancouver Canucks (1998–99)	22–18–3	T
44	January 17, 1999	1–4	@ Edmonton Oilers (1998–99)	22–19–3	L
45	January 19, 1999	1–3	@ Calgary Flames (1998–99)	22–20–3	L
46	January 21, 1999	4–1	Carolina Hurricanes (1998–99)	23–20–3	W
47	January 26, 1999	4–1	@ Nashville Predators (1998–99)	24–20–3	W
48	January 30, 1999	2–3	New York Rangers (1998–99)	24–21–3	L

February: 7–4–3 (home: 4–2–1; road: 3–2–2)

Game	Date	Score	Opponent	Record	Recap
49	February 1, 1999	2–2 OT	@ New Jersey Devils (1998–99)	24–21–4	T
50	February 3, 1999	5–1	New York Islanders (1998–99)	25–21–4	W
51	February 5, 1999	1–3	Colorado Avalanche (1998–99)	25–22–4	L
52	February 7, 1999	1–2	@ Pittsburgh Penguins (1998–99)	25–23–4	L
53	February 9, 1999	5–2	@ Nashville Predators (1998–99)	26–23–4	W
54	February 11, 1999	4–2	Edmonton Oilers (1998–99)	27–23–4	W
55	February 12, 1999	2–1	@ Chicago Blackhawks (1998–99)	28–23–4	W
56	February 14, 1999	4–2	@ New York Rangers (1998–99)	29–23–4	W
57	February 17, 1999	3–1	San Jose Sharks (1998–99)	30–23–4	W
58	February 19, 1999	3–1	New Jersey Devils (1998–99)	31–23–4	W
59	February 21, 1999	4–4 OT	@ Buffalo Sabres (1998–99)	31–23–5	T
60	February 24, 1999	2–3 OT	Los Angeles Kings (1998–99)	31–24–5	L
61	February 26, 1999	5–5 OT	Florida Panthers (1998–99)	31–24–6	T
62	February 27, 1999	1–3	@ New York Islanders (1998–99)	31–25–6	L

March: 7–5–0 (home: 4–1–0; road: 3–4–0)

Game	Date	Score	Opponent	Record	Recap
63	March 5, 1999	7–2	@ Phoenix Coyotes (1998–99)	32–25–6	W
64	March 7, 1999	1–3	@ Mighty Ducks of Anaheim (1998–99)	32–26–6	L
65	March 9, 1999	2–4	@ Los Angeles Kings (1998–99)	32–27–6	L
66	March 12, 1999	0–2	@ San Jose Sharks (1998–99)	32–28–6	L
67	March 14, 1999	3–1	@ Colorado Avalanche (1998–99)	33–28–6	W
68	March 17, 1999	3–4	Phoenix Coyotes (1998–99)	33–29–6	L
69	March 19, 1999	5–3	@ Tampa Bay Lightning (1998–99)	34–29–6	W
70	March 21, 1999	4–5	@ Philadelphia Flyers (1998–99)	34–30–6	L
71	March 24, 1999	2–1	Buffalo Sabres (1998–99)	35–30–6	W
72	March 26, 1999	6–1	Tampa Bay Lightning (1998–99)	36–30–6	W
73	March 28, 1999	3–2 OT	Philadelphia Flyers (1998–99)	37–30–6	W
74	March 31, 1999	2–1	Los Angeles Kings (1998–99)	38–30–6	W

April: 5–2–1 (home: 4–1–0; road: 1–1–1)

Game	Date	Score	Opponent	Record	Recap
75	April 2, 1999	5–3	Chicago Blackhawks (1998–99)	39–30–6	W
76	April 4, 1999	3–0	@ Dallas Stars (1998–99)	40–30–6	W
77	April 5, 1999	3–2	Mighty Ducks of Anaheim (1998–99)	41–30–6	W
78	April 7, 1999	6–1	Vancouver Canucks (1998–99)	42–30–6	W
79	April 9, 1999	1–1 OT	@ St. Louis Blues (1998–99)	42–30–7	T
80	April 11, 1999	0–3	Pittsburgh Penguins (1998–99)	42–31–7	L
81	April 14, 1999	4–2	Nashville Predators (1998–99)	43–31–7	W
82	April 17, 1999	2–3	@ Chicago Blackhawks (1998–99)	43–32–7	L

Legend: W Win (2 points) L Loss (0 points) T Tie (1 point)

=== Playoffs ===
1999 Stanley Cup playoffs
Western Conference Quarterfinals: vs. (6) Anaheim Mighty Ducks — Red Wings win 4–0

Game	Date	Score	Opponent	Series	Recap
1	April 21, 1999	5–3	Anaheim Mighty Ducks	Red Wings lead 1–0	W
2	April 23, 1999	5–1	Anaheim Mighty Ducks	Red Wings lead 2–0	W
3	April 25, 1999	4–2	@ Anaheim Mighty Ducks	Red Wings lead 3–0	W
4	April 27, 1999	3–0	@ Anaheim Mighty Ducks	Red Wings win 4–0	W

Western Conference Semifinals: vs. (2) Colorado Avalanche — Avalanche win 4–2

Game	Date	Score	Opponent	Series	Recap
1	May 7, 1999	3–2 OT	@ Colorado Avalanche	Red Wings lead 1–0	W
2	May 9, 1999	4–0	@ Colorado Avalanche	Red Wings lead 2–0	W
3	May 11, 1999	3–5	Colorado Avalanche	Red Wings lead 2–1	L
4	May 13, 1999	2–6	Colorado Avalanche	Series tied 2–2	L
5	May 16, 1999	0–3	@ Colorado Avalanche	Avalanche lead 3–2	L
6	May 18, 1999	2–5	Colorado Avalanche	Avalanche win 4–2	L

Legend: W Win L Loss

== Player statistics ==
=== Scoring ===
- Position abbreviations: C = Center; D = Defense; G = Goaltender; LW = Left wing; RW = Right wing
- † = Joined team via a transaction (e.g., trade, waivers, signing) during the season. Stats reflect time with the Red Wings only.
- ‡ = Left team via a transaction (e.g., trade, waivers, release) during the season. Stats reflect time with the Red Wings only.

No.	Player	Pos	Regular season						Playoffs					
No.	Player	Pos	GP	G	A	Pts	+/-	PIM	GP	G	A	Pts	+/-	PIM
19	Steve Yzerman	C	80	29	45	74	8	42	10	9	4	13	2	0
91	Sergei Fedorov	C	77	26	37	63	9	66	10	1	8	9	3	8
8	Igor Larionov	C	75	14	49	63	13	48	7	0	2	2	−1	0
14	Brendan Shanahan	LW	81	31	27	58	2	123	10	3	7	10	2	6
13	Vyacheslav Kozlov	C	79	29	29	58	10	45	10	6	1	7	−3	4
5	Nicklas Lidstrom	D	81	14	43	57	14	14	10	2	9	11	0	4
55	Larry Murphy	D	80	10	42	52	21	42	10	0	2	2	2	8
25	Darren McCarty	RW	69	14	26	40	10	108	10	1	1	2	−1	23
96	Tomas Holmstrom	LW	82	13	21	34	−11	69	10	4	3	7	2	4
20	Martin Lapointe	RW	77	16	13	29	7	141	10	0	2	2	0	20
17	Doug Brown	RW	80	9	19	28	5	42	10	2	2	4	0	4
33	Kris Draper	C	80	4	14	18	2	79	10	0	1	1	−1	6
18	Kirk Maltby	RW	53	8	6	14	−6	34	10	1	0	1	−2	8
11	Mathieu Dandenault	RW	75	4	10	14	17	59	10	0	1	1	0	0
23	Stacy Roest	C	59	4	8	12	−7	14	—	—	—	—	—	—
44	Anders Eriksson‡	D	61	2	10	12	5	34	—	—	—	—	—	—
27	Aaron Ward	D	60	3	8	11	−5	52	8	0	1	1	2	8
34	Jamie Macoun	D	69	1	10	11	−1	36	1	0	0	0	−1	0
26	Joe Kocur	RW	39	2	5	7	0	87	—	—	—	—	—	—
71	Wendel Clark†	LW	12	4	2	6	1	2	10	2	3	5	−1	10
4	Uwe Krupp	D	22	3	2	5	0	6	—	—	—	—	—	—
15	Todd Gill†	D	23	2	2	4	−4	11	2	0	1	1	0	0
30	Chris Osgood	G	63	0	0	3		8	6	0	0	0		0
24	Chris Chelios†	D	10	1	1	2	5	4	10	0	4	4	−6	14
41	Brent Gilchrist	LW	5	1	0	1	−1	0	3	0	0	0	−2	0
85	Petr Klima†	LW	13	1	0	1	−3	4	—	—	—	—	—	—
28	Yan Golubovsky	D	17	0	1	1	4	16	—	—	—	—	—	—
3	Doug Houda	D	3	0	1	1	−2	0	—	—	—	—	—	—
22	Philippe Audet	LW	4	0	0	0	−2	0	—	—	—	—	—	—
37 (Note: Hodson wore number 31 in his first two games.)	Kevin Hodson‡	G	4	0	0	0		0	—	—	—	—	—	—
21	Darryl Laplante	C	3	0	0	0	0	0	—	—	—	—	—	—
38	Norm Maracle	G	16	0	0	0		0	2	0	0	0		0
40	Bill Ranford†	G	4	0	0	0		0	4	0	0	0		0
2	Ulf Samuelsson†	D	4	0	0	0	−1	6	9	0	3	3	1	10

=== Goaltending ===
- † = Joined team via a transaction (e.g., trade, waivers, signing) during the season. Stats reflect time with the Red Wings only.
- ‡ = Left team via a transaction (e.g., trade, waivers, release) during the season. Stats reflect time with the Red Wings only.

No.	Player	Regular season											Playoffs									
No.	Player	GP	GS	W	L	T	SA	GA	GAA	SV%	SO	TOI	GP	GS	W	L	SA	GA	GAA	SV%	SO	TOI
30	Chris Osgood	63	63	34	25	4	1,654	149	2.42	.910	3	3,691:21	6	6	4	2	172	14	2.34	.919	1	358:26
38	Norm Maracle	16	12	6	5	2	379	31	2.27	.918	0	820:59	2	0	0	0	22	3	3.08	.864	0	58:22
40	Bill Ranford†	4	4	3	0	1	98	8	1.96	.918	0	244:22	4	4	2	2	105	10	3.28	.905	1	183:27
37	Kevin Hodson‡	4	3	0	2	0	79	9	3.08	.886	0	175:20	—	—	—	—	—	—	—	—	—	—

== Awards and records ==
=== Awards ===
Type	Award/honor	Recipient	Ref
League (annual)	NHL First All-Star Team	Nicklas Lidstrom (Defense)	
League (in-season)	NHL All-Star Game selection	Uwe Krupp (Note: Krupp, Lidstrom, Shanahan, and Yzerman were voted to the starting lineup. Krupp and Yzerman did not play and Yzerman was replaced by Luc Robitaille of the Los Angeles Kings.)	
League (in-season)	NHL All-Star Game selection	Nicklas Lidstrom	
League (in-season)	NHL All-Star Game selection	Larry Murphy	
League (in-season)	NHL All-Star Game selection	Brendan Shanahan	
League (in-season)	NHL All-Star Game selection	Steve Yzerman	
League (in-season)	NHL Player of the Week	Brendan Shanahan (October 19)	

=== Milestones ===
Milestone	Player	Date	Ref
First game	Stacy Roest	October 21, 1998	
First game	Philippe Audet	December 23, 1998	

== Draft picks ==
Detroit's draft picks at the 1998 NHL entry draft held at the Marine Midland Arena in Buffalo, New York.

Round	#	Player	Nationality	College/Junior/Club team (League)
1	25	Jiri Fischer	Czech Republic	Hull Olympiques (QMJHL)
2	55	Ryan Barnes	Canada	Sudbury Wolves (OHL)
2	56	Tomek Valtonen	Finland	Ilves (Finland)
3	84	Jake McCracken	Canada	Sault Ste. Marie Greyhounds (OHL)
4	111	Brent Hobday	Canada	Moose Jaw Warriors (WHL)
5	142	Calle Steen	Sweden	Hammarby IF (Sweden)
6	151	Adam Deleeuw	Canada	Barrie Colts (OHL)
6	171	Pavel Datsyuk	Russia	Dinamo-Energija Tekaterinburg (Russia)
7	198	Jeremy Goetzinger	Canada	Prince Albert Raiders (WHL)
8	226	David Petrasek	Sweden	HV71 (Sweden)
9	256	Petja Pietilainen	Finland	Saskatoon Blades (WHL)

== See also ==
- 1998–99 NHL season
