= 1998–99 Chicago Blackhawks season =

National Hockey League team season

1998–99 Chicago Blackhawks
- Division: 3rd Central
- Conference: 10th Western
- 1998–99 record: 29–41–12
- Home record: 20–17–4
- Road record: 9–24–8
- Goals for: 202
- Goals against: 248

Team information
- General manager: Bob Murray
- Coach: Dirk Graham (Oct.–Feb.); Lorne Molleken (Feb.–Apr.)
- Captain: Chris Chelios (Oct.–Mar.); Vacant (Mar.–Apr.)
- Arena: United Center
- Average attendance: 17,329
- Minor league affiliates: Portland Pirates; Columbus Chill

Team leaders
- Goals: Tony Amonte (44)
- Assists: Alexei Zhamnov (41)
- Points: Tony Amonte (75)
- Penalty minutes: Bob Probert (206)
- Plus/minus: Doug Gilmour (+16)
- Wins: Jocelyn Thibault (21)
- Goals against average: Jocelyn Thibault (2.69)

The 1998–99 Chicago Blackhawks season was the 73rd season of operation of the Chicago Blackhawks in the National Hockey League (NHL). They missed the playoffs in back to back seasons for the first time since the 1957–58 season.

== Regular season ==
The Blackhawks allowed the most power-play goals of all 27 teams, with 80. Captain Chris Chelios was traded late in the season, to the Detroit Red Wings. The team finishes the season without a captain.

=== Final standings ===
Central Division
R	CR		GP	W	L	T	GF	GA	PIM	Pts
1	3	**Detroit Red Wings**	82	43	32	7	245	202	1202	93
2	5	**St. Louis Blues**	82	37	32	13	237	209	1308	87
3	10	Chicago Blackhawks	82	29	41	12	202	248	1807	70
4	12	Nashville Predators	82	28	47	7	190	261	1420	63

Western Conference
R		Div	GP	W	L	T	GF	GA	Pts
**1**	**p – Dallas Stars**	**PAC**	**82**	**51**	**19**	**12**	**236**	**168**	**114**
**2**	**y – Colorado Avalanche**	**NW**	**82**	**44**	**28**	**10**	**239**	**205**	**98**
**3**	**y – Detroit Red Wings**	**CEN**	**82**	**43**	**32**	**7**	**245**	**202**	**93**
**4**	**Phoenix Coyotes**	**PAC**	**82**	**39**	**31**	**12**	**205**	**197**	**90**
**5**	**St. Louis Blues**	**CEN**	**82**	**37**	**32**	**13**	**237**	**209**	**87**
**6**	**Mighty Ducks of Anaheim**	**PAC**	**82**	**35**	**34**	**13**	**215**	**206**	**83**
**7**	**San Jose Sharks**	**PAC**	**82**	**31**	**33**	**18**	**196**	**191**	**80**
**8**	**Edmonton Oilers**	**NW**	**82**	**33**	**37**	**12**	**230**	**226**	**78**
9	Calgary Flames	NW	82	30	40	12	211	234	72
10	Chicago Blackhawks	CEN	82	29	41	12	202	248	70
11	Los Angeles Kings	PAC	82	32	45	5	189	222	69
12	Nashville Predators	CEN	82	28	47	7	190	261	63
13	Vancouver Canucks	NW	82	23	47	12	192	258	58

Divisions: CEN – Central, PAC – Pacific, NW – Northwest

bold – Qualified for playoffs; p – Won Presidents' Trophy; y – Won division

== Schedule and results ==
1998–99 regular season
October: 4–4–1 (home: 3–2–1; road: 1–2–0)

Game	Date	Score	Opponent	Record	Recap
1	October 10, 1998	2–1	New Jersey Devils (1998–99)	1–0–0	W
2	October 13, 1998	1–3	@ Dallas Stars (1998–99)	1–1–0	L
3	October 15, 1998	3–5	Mighty Ducks of Anaheim (1998–99)	1–2–0	L
4	October 17, 1998	4–3	Dallas Stars (1998–99)	2–2–0	W
5	October 19, 1998	2–1	@ Montreal Canadiens (1998–99)	3–2–0	W
6	October 22, 1998	2–2 OT	San Jose Sharks (1998–99)	3–2–1	T
7	October 24, 1998	5–4	Nashville Predators (1998–99)	4–2–1	W
8	October 28, 1998	0–2	@ Carolina Hurricanes (1998–99)	4–3–1	L
9	October 30, 1998	3–7	Florida Panthers (1998–99)	4–4–1	L

November: 2–10–2 (home: 0–3–1; road: 2–7–1)

Game	Date	Score	Opponent	Record	Recap
10	November 1, 1998	1–4	Calgary Flames (1998–99)	4–5–1	L
11	November 4, 1998	1–2	@ Florida Panthers (1998–99)	4–6–1	L
12	November 6, 1998	2–2 OT	@ Tampa Bay Lightning (1998–99)	4–6–2	T
13	November 8, 1998	2–3 OT	Edmonton Oilers (1998–99)	4–7–2	L
14	November 10, 1998	2–5	@ St. Louis Blues (1998–99)	4–8–2	L
15	November 12, 1998	3–10	Toronto Maple Leafs (1998–99)	4–9–2	L
16	November 14, 1998	1–6	@ Buffalo Sabres (1998–99)	4–10–2	L
17	November 15, 1998	2–2 OT	Ottawa Senators (1998–99)	4–10–3	T
18	November 17, 1998	2–1	@ Nashville Predators (1998–99)	5–10–3	W
19	November 21, 1998	0–5	@ Los Angeles Kings (1998–99)	5–11–3	L
20	November 22, 1998	1–4	@ Mighty Ducks of Anaheim (1998–99)	5–12–3	L
21	November 24, 1998	2–3	@ Phoenix Coyotes (1998–99)	5–13–3	L
22	November 28, 1998	4–5	@ Calgary Flames (1998–99)	5–14–3	L
23	November 29, 1998	3–2	@ Edmonton Oilers (1998–99)	6–14–3	W

December: 5–6–1 (home: 5–4–1; road: 0–2–0)

Game	Date	Score	Opponent	Record	Recap
24	December 3, 1998	4–1	Mighty Ducks of Anaheim (1998–99)	7–14–3	W
25	December 6, 1998	7–5	Tampa Bay Lightning (1998–99)	8–14–3	W
26	December 8, 1998	2–3	@ Detroit Red Wings (1998–99)	8–15–3	L
27	December 9, 1998	3–1	Edmonton Oilers (1998–99)	9–15–3	W
28	December 11, 1998	2–3	Toronto Maple Leafs (1998–99)	9–16–3	L
29	December 13, 1998	2–2 OT	Dallas Stars (1998–99)	9–16–4	T
30	December 17, 1998	1–3	Washington Capitals (1998–99)	9–17–4	L
31	December 19, 1998	1–3	@ Philadelphia Flyers (1998–99)	9–18–4	L
32	December 20, 1998	1–4	Los Angeles Kings (1998–99)	9–19–4	L
33	December 23, 1998	4–3	Phoenix Coyotes (1998–99)	10–19–4	W
34	December 26, 1998	2–3	Philadelphia Flyers (1998–99)	10–20–4	L
35	December 31, 1998	1–0	New York Islanders (1998–99)	11–20–4	W

January: 3–6–4 (home: 1–2–1; road: 2–4–3)

Game	Date	Score	Opponent	Record	Recap
36	January 2, 1999	2–5	@ Detroit Red Wings (1998–99)	11–21–4	L
37	January 3, 1999	1–3	Detroit Red Wings (1998–99)	11–22–4	L
38	January 5, 1999	1–1 OT	@ New York Islanders (1998–99)	11–22–5	T
39	January 7, 1999	2–4	@ St. Louis Blues (1998–99)	11–23–5	L
40	January 9, 1999	3–3 OT	@ Nashville Predators (1998–99)	11–23–6	T
41	January 10, 1999	2–3 OT	Colorado Avalanche (1998–99)	11–24–6	L
42	January 12, 1999	1–4	@ Colorado Avalanche (1998–99)	11–25–6	L
43	January 15, 1999	3–1	@ New York Rangers (1998–99)	12–25–6	W
44	January 17, 1999	1–1 OT	Phoenix Coyotes (1998–99)	12–25–7	T
45	January 21, 1999	3–0	Montreal Canadiens (1998–99)	13–25–7	W
46	January 27, 1999	4–3 OT	@ Edmonton Oilers (1998–99)	14–25–7	W
47	January 28, 1999	6–6 OT	@ Calgary Flames (1998–99)	14–25–8	T
48	January 30, 1999	2–3	@ Vancouver Canucks (1998–99)	14–26–8	L

February: 3–11–0 (home: 1–5–0; road: 2–6–0)

Game	Date	Score	Opponent	Record	Recap
49	February 1, 1999	1–5	@ San Jose Sharks (1998–99)	14–27–8	L
50	February 3, 1999	0–3	@ Mighty Ducks of Anaheim (1998–99)	14–28–8	L
51	February 4, 1999	2–3	@ Los Angeles Kings (1998–99)	14–29–8	L
52	February 6, 1999	0–3	@ Phoenix Coyotes (1998–99)	14–30–8	L
53	February 10, 1999	2–5	San Jose Sharks (1998–99)	14–31–8	L
54	February 12, 1999	1–2	Detroit Red Wings (1998–99)	14–32–8	L
55	February 13, 1999	6–2	@ Toronto Maple Leafs (1998–99)	15–32–8	W
56	February 15, 1999	2–6	@ Ottawa Senators (1998–99)	15–33–8	L
57	February 17, 1999	4–0	Vancouver Canucks (1998–99)	16–33–8	W
58	February 19, 1999	1–5	@ Dallas Stars (1998–99)	16–34–8	L
59	February 21, 1999	3–6	Boston Bruins (1998–99)	16–35–8	L
60	February 24, 1999	3–1	@ St. Louis Blues (1998–99)	17–35–8	W
61	February 26, 1999	1–2	Los Angeles Kings (1998–99)	17–36–8	L
62	February 28, 1999	1–3	St. Louis Blues (1998–99)	17–37–8	L

March: 6–3–4 (home: 5–1–0; road: 1–2–4)

Game	Date	Score	Opponent	Record	Recap
63	March 6, 1999	4–0	@ San Jose Sharks (1998–99)	18–37–8	W
64	March 7, 1999	2–2 OT	@ Vancouver Canucks (1998–99)	18–37–9	T
65	March 10, 1999	5–2	Nashville Predators (1998–99)	19–37–9	W
66	March 12, 1999	3–5	@ Nashville Predators (1998–99)	19–38–9	L
67	March 14, 1999	2–5	St. Louis Blues (1998–99)	19–39–9	L
68	March 17, 1999	3–1	Calgary Flames (1998–99)	20–39–9	W
69	March 20, 1999	5–5 OT	@ Colorado Avalanche (1998–99)	20–39–10	T
70	March 21, 1999	4–3	Colorado Avalanche (1998–99)	21–39–10	W
71	March 23, 1999	2–5	@ Pittsburgh Penguins (1998–99)	21–40–10	L
72	March 25, 1999	3–3 OT	@ Boston Bruins (1998–99)	21–40–11	T
73	March 27, 1999	4–4 OT	@ New Jersey Devils (1998–99)	21–40–12	T
74	March 28, 1999	3–1	St. Louis Blues (1998–99)	22–40–12	W
75	March 31, 1999	2–1	Buffalo Sabres (1998–99)	23–40–12	W

April: 6–1–0 (home: 5–0–0; road: 1–1–0)

Game	Date	Score	Opponent	Record	Recap
76	April 2, 1999	3–5	@ Detroit Red Wings (1998–99)	23–41–12	L
77	April 3, 1999	2–1	Carolina Hurricanes (1998–99)	24–41–12	W
78	April 5, 1999	2–1	Vancouver Canucks (1998–99)	25–41–12	W
79	April 8, 1999	6–2	New York Rangers (1998–99)	26–41–12	W
80	April 12, 1999	4–2	@ Washington Capitals (1998–99)	27–41–12	W
81	April 15, 1999	4–2	Nashville Predators (1998–99)	28–41–12	W
82	April 17, 1999	3–2	Detroit Red Wings (1998–99)	29–41–12	W

Legend: W Win (2 points) L Loss (0 points) T Tie (1 point)

== Player statistics ==
=== Scoring ===
- Position abbreviations: C = Center; D = Defense; G = Goaltender; LW = Left wing; RW = Right wing
- † = Joined team via a transaction (e.g., trade, waivers, signing) during the season. Stats reflect time with the Blackhawks only.
- ‡ = Left team via a transaction (e.g., trade, waivers, release) during the season. Stats reflect time with the Blackhawks only.

No.	Player	Pos	Regular season					
No.	Player	Pos	GP	G	A	Pts	+/-	PIM
10	Tony Amonte	RW	82	44	31	75	0	60
36	Alexei Zhamnov	C	76	20	41	61	−10	50
93	Doug Gilmour	C	72	16	40	56	−16	56
55	Eric Daze	LW	72	22	20	42	−13	22
7	Chris Chelios‡	D	65	8	26	34	−4	89
15	Chad Kilger‡	C	64	14	11	25	−1	30
16	Eddie Olczyk	C	61	10	15	25	−3	29
24	Bob Probert	LW	78	7	14	21	−11	206
22 (Note: Manson wore number 8 in his first game.)	Dave Manson†	D	64	6	15	21	4	107
17	Jean-Pierre Dumont	RW	25	9	6	15	7	10
19	Ethan Moreau‡	LW	66	9	6	15	−5	84
11	Nelson Emerson†‡	RW	27	4	10	14	8	13
4	Doug Zmolek	D	62	0	14	14	1	102
26	Todd White	C	35	5	8	13	−1	20
3	Christian Laflamme‡	D	62	2	11	13	0	70
33	Reid Simpson	LW	53	5	4	9	2	145
25	Daniel Cleary‡	LW	35	4	5	9	−1	24
3	Boris Mironov†	D	12	0	9	9	7	27
23	Jean-Yves Leroux	LW	40	3	5	8	−7	21
2	Brad Brown†	D	61	1	7	8	−4	184
8 (Note: Eriksson wore number 6 in his first two games.)	Anders Eriksson†	D	11	0	8	8	6	0
14	Mike Maneluk†‡	RW	28	4	3	7	2	8
44	Josef Marha†	C	22	2	5	7	5	4
34	Dean McAmmond†	C	12	1	4	5	3	2
37 (Note: Muir wore number 45 in his first game.)	Bryan Muir†	D	53	1	4	5	1	50
38	Jamie Allison†	D	39	2	2	4	0	62
2	Eric Weinrich‡	D	14	1	3	4	−13	12
77	Paul Coffey‡	D	10	0	4	4	−6	0
20	Mark Janssens	C	60	1	0	1	−11	65
11	Jeff Shantz‡	C	7	1	0	1	−1	4
30	Mark Fitzpatrick	G	27	0	1	1		8
41	Jocelyn Thibault†	G	52	0	1	1		2
32	Radim Bicanek†	D	7	0	0	0	−3	6
44 (Note: Bonvie wore number 46 in his first three games.)	Dennis Bonvie†‡	RW	11	0	0	0	−4	44
14	Sylvain Cloutier	C	7	0	0	0	−1	0
14	Steve Dubinsky‡	C	1	0	0	0	0	0
31	Jeff Hackett‡	G	10	0	0	0		6
27	Ty Jones	RW	8	0	0	0	−1	12
39 (Note: Mills wore number 22 in his first game.)	Craig Mills	RW	7	0	0	0	−2	2
15	Chris Murray†	RW	4	0	0	0	0	14
32	Alain Nasreddine‡	D	7	0	0	0	−2	19
6	Remi Royer	D	18	0	0	0	−10	67
8	Cam Russell‡	D	7	0	0	0	1	10
29	Andrei Trefilov†‡	G	1	0	0	0		0
19 (Note: VandenBussche wore number 32 in his first two games.)	Ryan VandenBussche	RW	6	0	0	0	0	17
14	Roman Vopat†‡	C	3	0	0	0	−4	4
5	Trent Yawney‡	D	20	0	0	0	−6	32

=== Goaltending ===
- † = Joined team via a transaction (e.g., trade, waivers, signing) during the season. Stats reflect time with the Blackhawks only.
- ‡ = Left team via a transaction (e.g., trade, waivers, release) during the season. Stats reflect time with the Blackhawks only.

No.	Player	Regular season									
No.	Player	GP	W	L	T	SA	GA	GAA	SV%	SO	TOI
41	Jocelyn Thibault†	52	21	26	5	1435	136	2.71	.905	4	3014
30	Mark Fitzpatrick	27	6	8	6	682	64	2.78	.906	0	1403
31	Jeff Hackett‡	10	2	6	1	256	33	4.12	.871	0	524
29	Andrei Trefilov†‡	1	0	1	0	20	4	9.70	.800	0	25

== Awards and records ==
=== Awards ===
Type	Award/honor	Recipient	Ref
League (in-season)	NHL All-Star Game selection	Tony Amonte	
League (in-season)	NHL Rookie of the Month	Jean-Pierre Dumont (April)	

=== Milestones ===
Milestone	Player	Date	Ref
First game	Ty Jones	October 10, 1998	
First game	Alain Nasreddine	October 10, 1998	
First game	Remi Royer	October 10, 1998	
First game	Jean-Pierre Dumont	November 12, 1998	
First game	Sylvain Cloutier	March 10, 1999	

== Draft picks ==
Chicago's draft picks at the 1998 NHL entry draft held at the Marine Midland Arena in Buffalo, New York.

Round	#	Player	Nationality	College/Junior/Club team (League)
1	8	Mark Bell	Canada	Ottawa 67's (OHL)
4	94	Matthias Trattnig	Austria	University of Maine (Hockey East)
6	156	Kent Huskins	Canada	Clarkson University (ECAC)
6	158	Jari Viuhkola	Finland	Karpat (Finland)
6	166	Jonathan Pelletier	Canada	Drummondville Voltigeurs (QMJHL)
7	183	Tyler Arnason	United States	St. Cloud State University (WCHA)
8	210	Sean Griffin	Canada	Kingston Frontenacs (OHL)
9	238	Alexandre Couture	Canada	Sherbrooke Faucons (QMJHL)
9	240	Andrei Yershov	Russia	Khimik Voskresensk (Russia)

== See also ==
- 1998–99 NHL season
