= 1998–99 San Jose Sharks season =

1998–99 San Jose Sharks
- Division: 4th Pacific
- Conference: 7th Western
- 1998–99 record: 31–33–18
- Home record: 17–15–9
- Road record: 14–18–9
- Goals for: 196
- Goals against: 191

Team information
- General manager: Dean Lombardi
- Coach: Darryl Sutter
- Captain: Owen Nolan
- Arena: San Jose Arena
- Average attendance: 16,903
- Minor league affiliates: Kentucky Thoroughblades; Richmond Renegades

Team leaders
- Goals: Joe Murphy (25)
- Assists: Jeff Friesen (35)
- Points: Jeff Friesen (57)
- Penalty minutes: Ronnie Stern (158)
- Plus/minus: Owen Nolan (+16)
- Wins: Mike Vernon (16)
- Goals against average: Steve Shields (2.22)

The 1998–99 San Jose Sharks season was the Sharks' eighth season of operation in the National Hockey League (NHL). Under second-year head coach Darryl Sutter, the Sharks reached the playoffs for a second consecutive season. While the team won three fewer games than it had during the prior season, it became the first in franchise history to score more goals (196) than it allowed (191).

During the campaign, general manager Dean Lombardi continued to add to the Sharks' roster. During the 1998 preseason, both goaltender Steve Shields and All-Star defenseman Gary Suter were acquired from the Buffalo Sabres and Chicago Blackhawks, respectively, in exchange for low-level draft picks and prospects. While neither played a major role during the 1998–99 season, both would make key contributions to the Sharks' success the following season. Indeed, Lombardi's most notable addition was that of veteran forward Vincent Damphousse. Damphousse, acquired in a midseason trade with the Montreal Canadiens, would experience immediate success in San Jose; he would ultimately remain with the Sharks until the conclusion of the 2003–04 season. The 1998–99 season also saw the continued development of several highly-touted prospects. Most notably, the campaign saw second-year forwards Patrick Marleau and Marco Sturm emerge as consistent scoring threats. Additionally, the season also saw the debut of promising young defenseman (and future NHL All-Star) Scott Hannan. These players, along with established forward Jeff Friesen and defenseman Mike Rathje, would drive much of the team's success over the following five years.

Despite their losing record, the Sharks reached the postseason for a second consecutive season. In the first round of the 1999 Stanley Cup playoffs, the Sharks were matched against the Northwest Division champion Colorado Avalanche. Due to the Columbine High School Massacre, the first two games of the series were played in San Jose; the heavily favored Avalanche won both. As had been the case one year prior, the Sharks won their next two games in Denver to even the series at two games apiece. The Avalanche responded by routing the Sharks in Game Five to take a 3–2 series lead. The Sharks managed to push the Avalanche to overtime in Game Six; a goal by Colorado rookie Milan Hejduk, however, spelled the end of the Sharks' season. As of the 2017–18 NHL season, the 1998–99 San Jose Sharks (along with the 1998–99 Edmonton Oilers) are the last team to have qualified for the Stanley Cup Playoffs with a losing record.

== Off-season ==
Forward Owen Nolan was named team captain.

== Regular season ==
The Sharks tied the Dallas Stars and St. Louis Blues for the fewest short-handed goals allowed, with 4.

=== Final standings ===
Pacific Division
R	CR		GP	W	L	T	GF	GA	Pts
1	1	**Dallas Stars**	82	51	19	12	236	168	114
2	4	**Phoenix Coyotes**	82	39	31	12	205	197	90
3	6	**Mighty Ducks of Anaheim**	82	35	34	13	215	206	83
4	7	**San Jose Sharks**	82	31	33	18	196	191	80
5	11	Los Angeles Kings	82	32	45	5	189	222	69

Note: CR = Conference rank; GP = Games played; W = Wins; L = Losses; T = Ties; GF = Goals for; GA = Goals against; Pts = Points
Bolded teams qualified for the playoffs.

Western Conference
R		Div	GP	W	L	T	GF	GA	Pts
**1**	**p – Dallas Stars**	**PAC**	**82**	**51**	**19**	**12**	**236**	**168**	**114**
**2**	**y – Colorado Avalanche**	**NW**	**82**	**44**	**28**	**10**	**239**	**205**	**98**
**3**	**y – Detroit Red Wings**	**CEN**	**82**	**43**	**32**	**7**	**245**	**202**	**93**
**4**	**Phoenix Coyotes**	**PAC**	**82**	**39**	**31**	**12**	**205**	**197**	**90**
**5**	**St. Louis Blues**	**CEN**	**82**	**37**	**32**	**13**	**237**	**209**	**87**
**6**	**Mighty Ducks of Anaheim**	**PAC**	**82**	**35**	**34**	**13**	**215**	**206**	**83**
**7**	**San Jose Sharks**	**PAC**	**82**	**31**	**33**	**18**	**196**	**191**	**80**
**8**	**Edmonton Oilers**	**NW**	**82**	**33**	**37**	**12**	**230**	**226**	**78**
9	Calgary Flames	NW	82	30	40	12	211	234	72
10	Chicago Blackhawks	CEN	82	29	41	12	202	248	70
11	Los Angeles Kings	PAC	82	32	45	5	189	222	69
12	Nashville Predators	CEN	82	28	47	7	190	261	63
13	Vancouver Canucks	NW	82	23	47	12	192	258	58

Divisions: CEN – Central, PAC – Pacific, NW – Northwest

bold – Qualified for playoffs; p – Won Presidents' Trophy; y – Won division

== Schedule and results ==
=== Regular season ===
1998–99 regular season
October: 1–6–2 (home: 1–3–0; road: 0–3–2)

Game	Date	Score	Opponent	Record	Recap
1	October 9, 1998	3–3 OT	@ Calgary Flames (1998–99)	0–0–1	T
2	October 10, 1998	3–5	Calgary Flames (1998–99)	0–1–1	L
3	October 18, 1998	0–3	Boston Bruins (1998–99)	0–2–1	L
4	October 20, 1998	1–3	@ Philadelphia Flyers (1998–99)	0–3–1	L
5	October 22, 1998	2–2 OT	@ Chicago Blackhawks (1998–99)	0–3–2	T
6	October 24, 1998	1–2	@ Dallas Stars (1998–99)	0–4–2	L
7	October 28, 1998	2–4	Phoenix Coyotes (1998–99)	0–5–2	L
8	October 29, 1998	2–4	@ Colorado Avalanche (1998–99)	0–6–2	L
9	October 31, 1998	6–1	Tampa Bay Lightning (1998–99)	1–6–2	W

November: 4–5–3 (home: 3–2–2; road: 1–3–1)

Game	Date	Score	Opponent	Record	Recap
10	November 4, 1998	4–0	Dallas Stars (1998–99)	2–6–2	W
11	November 6, 1998	2–2 OT	@ Mighty Ducks of Anaheim (1998–99)	2–6–3	T
12	November 7, 1998	2–2 OT	St. Louis Blues (1998–99)	2–6–4	T
13	November 10, 1998	2–4	Nashville Predators (1998–99)	2–7–4	L
14	November 12, 1998	3–0	Carolina Hurricanes (1998–99)	3–7–4	W
15	November 18, 1998	5–4	Los Angeles Kings (1998–99)	4–7–4	W
16	November 20, 1998	1–2 OT	Phoenix Coyotes (1998–99)	4–8–4	L
17	November 21, 1998	2–2 OT	New York Rangers (1998–99)	4–8–5	T
18	November 23, 1998	2–3	@ Dallas Stars (1998–99)	4–9–5	L
19	November 25, 1998	0–3	@ Carolina Hurricanes (1998–99)	4–10–5	L
20	November 27, 1998	4–2	@ St. Louis Blues (1998–99)	5–10–5	W
21	November 29, 1998	1–4	@ Detroit Red Wings (1998–99)	5–11–5	L

December: 5–5–3 (home: 4–3–2; road: 1–2–1)

Game	Date	Score	Opponent	Record	Recap
22	December 2, 1998	0–3	Dallas Stars (1998–99)	5–12–5	L
23	December 4, 1998	2–2 OT	Detroit Red Wings (1998–99)	5–12–6	T
24	December 6, 1998	1–2	Mighty Ducks of Anaheim (1998–99)	5–13–6	L
25	December 9, 1998	3–3 OT	@ Dallas Stars (1998–99)	5–13–7	T
26	December 10, 1998	1–2	@ Nashville Predators (1998–99)	5–14–7	L
27	December 12, 1998	2–1	Washington Capitals (1998–99)	6–14–7	W
28	December 15, 1998	0–1	New York Islanders (1998–99)	6–15–7	L
29	December 17, 1998	3–1	Nashville Predators (1998–99)	7–15–7	W
30	December 19, 1998	2–1	Colorado Avalanche (1998–99)	8–15–7	W
31	December 23, 1998	5–3	@ Edmonton Oilers (1998–99)	9–15–7	W
32	December 26, 1998	2–0	Vancouver Canucks (1998–99)	10–15–7	W
33	December 28, 1998	1–1 OT	Philadelphia Flyers (1998–99)	10–15–8	T
34	December 30, 1998	1–5	@ Los Angeles Kings (1998–99)	10–16–8	L

January: 5–4–4 (home: 3–2–3; road: 2–2–1)

Game	Date	Score	Opponent	Record	Recap
35	January 2, 1999	4–3 OT	@ New York Islanders (1998–99)	11–16–8	W
36	January 4, 1999	3–4	@ New York Rangers (1998–99)	11–17–8	L
37	January 5, 1999	3–3 OT	@ New Jersey Devils (1998–99)	11–17–9	T
38	January 7, 1999	4–3	@ Nashville Predators (1998–99)	12–17–9	W
39	January 9, 1999	2–2 OT	Buffalo Sabres (1998–99)	12–17–10	T
40	January 11, 1999	4–0	Los Angeles Kings (1998–99)	13–17–10	W
41	January 13, 1999	1–2	Dallas Stars (1998–99)	13–18–10	L
42	January 15, 1999	3–2	Pittsburgh Penguins (1998–99)	14–18–10	W
43	January 16, 1999	3–3 OT	Calgary Flames (1998–99)	14–18–11	T
44	January 18, 1999	3–1	New Jersey Devils (1998–99)	15–18–11	W
45	January 21, 1999	3–3 OT	Edmonton Oilers (1998–99)	15–18–12	T
46	January 26, 1999	0–3	St. Louis Blues (1998–99)	15–19–12	L
47	January 30, 1999	0–5	@ Colorado Avalanche (1998–99)	15–20–12	L

February: 5–7–2 (home: 1–1–1; road: 4–6–1)

Game	Date	Score	Opponent	Record	Recap
48	February 1, 1999	5–1	Chicago Blackhawks (1998–99)	16–20–12	W
49	February 4, 1999	1–3	@ Phoenix Coyotes (1998–99)	16–21–12	L
50	February 6, 1999	0–2	@ Los Angeles Kings (1998–99)	16–22–12	L
51	February 8, 1999	3–0	@ Phoenix Coyotes (1998–99)	17–22–12	W
52	February 10, 1999	5–2	@ Chicago Blackhawks (1998–99)	18–22–12	W
53	February 11, 1999	5–1	@ St. Louis Blues (1998–99)	19–22–12	W
54	February 13, 1999	3–1	@ Tampa Bay Lightning (1998–99)	20–22–12	W
55	February 15, 1999	2–2 OT	@ Florida Panthers (1998–99)	20–22–13	T
56	February 17, 1999	1–3	@ Detroit Red Wings (1998–99)	20–23–13	L
57	February 19, 1999	2–4	@ Buffalo Sabres (1998–99)	20–24–13	L
58	February 20, 1999	1–3	@ Washington Capitals (1998–99)	20–25–13	L
59	February 24, 1999	1–1 OT	Vancouver Canucks (1998–99)	20–25–14	T
60	February 26, 1999	1–3	@ Mighty Ducks of Anaheim (1998–99)	20–26–14	L
61	February 27, 1999	1–4	Mighty Ducks of Anaheim (1998–99)	20–27–14	L

March: 7–3–3 (home: 4–2–0; road: 3–1–3)

Game	Date	Score	Opponent	Record	Recap
62	March 1, 1999	2–1	@ Calgary Flames (1998–99)	21–27–14	W
63	March 3, 1999	4–3	@ Vancouver Canucks (1998–99)	22–27–14	W
64	March 6, 1999	0–4	Chicago Blackhawks (1998–99)	22–28–14	L
65	March 9, 1999	4–2	Phoenix Coyotes (1998–99)	23–28–14	W
66	March 12, 1999	2–0	Detroit Red Wings (1998–99)	24–28–14	W
67	March 13, 1999	3–2	Ottawa Senators (1998–99)	25–28–14	W
68	March 17, 1999	4–2	Florida Panthers (1998–99)	26–28–14	W
69	March 20, 1999	2–2 OT	@ Boston Bruins (1998–99)	26–28–15	T
70	March 22, 1999	1–1 OT	@ Montreal Canadiens (1998–99)	26–28–16	T
71	March 24, 1999	8–5	@ Toronto Maple Leafs (1998–99)	27–28–16	W
72	March 26, 1999	1–1 OT	@ Ottawa Senators (1998–99)	27–28–17	T
73	March 28, 1999	2–5	@ Edmonton Oilers (1998–99)	27–29–17	L
74	March 31, 1999	2–3	Colorado Avalanche (1998–99)	27–30–17	L

April: 4–3–1 (home: 1–2–1; road: 3–1–0)

Game	Date	Score	Opponent	Record	Recap
75	April 2, 1999	7–0	@ Vancouver Canucks (1998–99)	28–30–17	W
76	April 3, 1999	5–2	Vancouver Canucks (1998–99)	29–30–17	W
77	April 6, 1999	1–0	@ Phoenix Coyotes (1998–99)	30–30–17	W
78	April 8, 1999	2–3	@ Los Angeles Kings (1998–99)	30–31–17	L
79	April 9, 1999	4–1	@ Mighty Ducks of Anaheim (1998–99)	31–31–17	W
80	April 12, 1999	4–5 OT	Edmonton Oilers (1998–99)	31–32–17	L
81	April 16, 1999	0–2	Los Angeles Kings (1998–99)	31–33–17	L
82	April 17, 1999	3–3 OT	Mighty Ducks of Anaheim (1998–99)	31–33–18	T

Legend: W Win (2 points) L Loss (0 points) T Tie (1 point)

=== Playoffs ===
1999 Stanley Cup playoffs
Western Conference Quarterfinals vs. (2) Colorado Avalanche: Avalanche win 4–2

Game	Date	Score	Opponent	Series	Recap
1	April 24, 1999	1–3	@ Colorado Avalanche	Avalanche lead 1–0	L
2	April 26, 1999	1–2 OT	@ Colorado Avalanche	Avalanche lead 2–0	L
3	April 28, 1999	4–2	Colorado Avalanche	Avalanche lead 2–1	W
4	April 30, 1999	7–3	Colorado Avalanche	Series tied 2–2	W
5	May 1, 1999	2–6	@ Colorado Avalanche	Avalanche lead 3–2	L
6	May 3, 1999	2–3 OT	Colorado Avalanche	Avalanche win 4–2	L

Legend: W Win L Loss

== Player statistics ==
=== Scoring ===
- Position abbreviations: C = Center; D = Defense; G = Goaltender; LW = Left wing; RW = Right wing
- † = Joined team via a transaction (e.g., trade, waivers, signing) during the season. Stats reflect time with the Sharks only.
- ‡ = Left team via a transaction (e.g., trade, waivers, release) during the season. Stats reflect time with the Sharks only.

No.	Player	Pos	Regular season						Playoffs					
No.	Player	Pos	GP	G	A	Pts	+/-	PIM	GP	G	A	Pts	+/-	PIM
39	Jeff Friesen	LW	78	22	35	57	3	42	6	2	2	4	−1	14
17	Joe Murphy	RW	76	25	23	48	10	73	6	0	3	3	0	4
14	Patrick Marleau	C	81	21	24	45	10	24	6	2	1	3	−1	4
11	Owen Nolan	RW	78	19	26	45	16	129	6	1	1	2	0	6
18	Mike Ricci	C	82	13	26	39	1	68	6	2	3	5	1	10
19	Marco Sturm	LW	78	16	22	38	7	52	6	2	2	4	1	4
2	Bill Houlder	D	76	9	23	32	8	40	6	3	0	3	2	4
15	Alexander Korolyuk	LW	55	12	18	30	3	26	6	1	3	4	−3	2
37	Stephane Matteau	LW	68	8	15	23	2	73	5	0	0	0	−3	6
5	Jeff Norton†	D	69	4	18	22	2	42	6	0	7	7	5	10
22	Ron Stern	RW	78	7	9	16	−3	158	6	0	0	0	−1	6
26	Dave Lowry	LW	61	6	9	15	−5	24	1	0	0	0	0	0
40	Mike Rathje	D	82	5	9	14	15	36	6	0	0	0	−6	4
32	Murray Craven	LW	43	4	10	14	−3	18	—	—	—	—	—	—
25	Vincent Damphousse†	C	12	7	6	13	3	4	6	3	2	5	1	6
10	Marcus Ragnarsson	D	74	0	13	13	7	66	6	0	1	1	−4	6
21	Tony Granato	RW	35	6	6	12	4	54	6	1	1	2	−1	2
3	Bob Rouse	D	70	0	11	11	0	44	6	0	0	0	−1	6
12	Ron Sutter	C	59	3	6	9	−8	40	6	0	0	0	−1	4
27	Bryan Marchment	D	59	2	6	8	−7	101	6	0	0	0	0	4
4	Andrei Zyuzin	D	25	3	1	4	5	38	—	—	—	—	—	—
36	Steve Guolla	C	14	2	2	4	3	6	—	—	—	—	—	—
42	Andy Sutton	D	31	0	3	3	−4	65	—	—	—	—	—	—
8	Jarrod Skalde	C	17	1	1	2	−6	4	—	—	—	—	—	—
6	Scott Hannan	D	5	0	2	2	0	6	—	—	—	—	—	—
9	Bernie Nicholls‡	C	10	0	2	2	−4	4	—	—	—	—	—	—
33	Brantt Myhres	RW	30	1	0	1	−2	116	—	—	—	—	—	—
13	Jamie Baker	C	1	0	1	1	1	0	—	—	—	—	—	—
7	Shawn Burr	LW	18	0	1	1	−3	29	—	—	—	—	—	—
16	Alex Hicks‡	LW	4	0	1	1	−1	4	—	—	—	—	—	—
31	Steve Shields	G	37	0	1	1		6	1	0	0	0		0
25	Mike Craig	RW	1	0	0	0	−1	0	—	—	—	—	—	—
30	Sean Gauthier	G	1	0	0	0		0	—	—	—	—	—	—
23	Shawn Heins	D	5	0	0	0	0	13	—	—	—	—	—	—
20	Gary Suter	D	1	0	0	0	0	0	—	—	—	—	—	—
29	Mike Vernon	G	49	0	0	0		8	5	0	1	1		0

=== Goaltending ===
No.	Player	Regular season										Playoffs								
No.	Player	GP	W	L	T	SA	GA	GAA	SV%	SO	TOI	GP	W	L	SA	GA	GAA	SV%	SO	TOI
29	Mike Vernon	49	16	22	10	1200	107	2.27	.911	4	2831	5	2	3	172	13	2.43	.924	0	321
31	Steve Shields	37	15	11	8	1011	80	2.22	.921	4	2162	1	0	1	36	6	6.00	.833	0	60
30	Sean Gauthier	1	0	0	0	2	0	0.00	1.000	0	3	—	—	—	—	—	—	—	—	—

== Awards and records ==
=== Awards ===
Type	Award/honor	Recipient	Ref
League (in-season)	NHL All-Star Game selection	Marco Sturm	
League (in-season)	NHL Player of the Week	Mike Vernon (February 15)	
League (in-season)	NHL Player of the Week	Steve Shields (March 15)	
Team	Sharks Player of the Year	Steve Shields	
Team	Sharks Player of the Year	Mike Vernon	
Team	Sharks Rookie of the Year	Alexander Korolyuk	

=== Milestones ===
Milestone	Player	Date	Ref
First game	Scott Hannan	October 9, 1998	
First game	Andy Sutton	October 20, 1998	
First game	Shawn Heins	February 19, 1999	
First game	Sean Gauthier	March 6, 1999	
1,000th game played	Bob Rouse	January 2, 1999	
1,000th game played	Vincent Damphousse	April 6, 1999	

== Draft picks ==
San Jose's draft picks at the 1998 NHL entry draft held at the Marine Midland Arena in Buffalo, New York.

Round	#	Player	Position	Nationality	College/Junior/Club team
1	3	Brad Stuart	Defense	Canada	Regina Pats
2	29	Jonathan Cheechoo	Right wing	Canada	Belleville Bulls
3	65	Eric Laplante	Left wing	Canada	Halifax Mooseheads
4	98	Rob Davison	Defense	Canada	North Bay Centennials
4	104	Miroslav Zalesak	Right wing	Slovakia	HC Plastika Nitra
5	127	Brandon Coalter	Left wing	Canada	Oshawa Generals
5	145	Mikael Samuelsson	Right wing	Sweden	Sodertalje SK
7	185	Robert Mulick	Defense	Canada	Sault Ste. Marie Greyhounds
8	212	Jim Fahey	Defense	Canada	Catholic Memorial H.S.

== See also ==
- 1998–99 NHL season
