= List of Arizona Coyotes award winners =

Arizona Coyotes awards
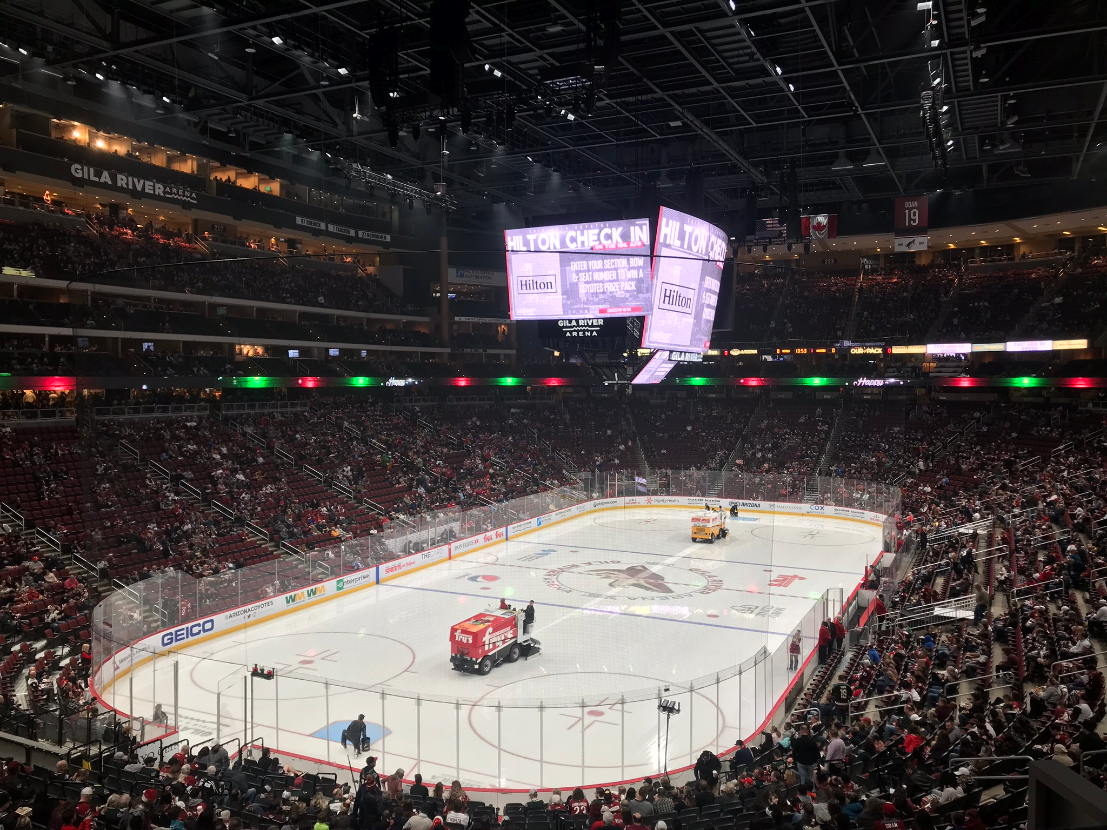
- Gila River Arena in 2019. The banner for Shane Doan's retired number is visible in the rafters.

Team trophies
- Award*: Wins
- Stanley Cup: 0
- Clarence S. Campbell Bowl: 0
- Presidents' Trophy: 0

Individual awards
- Award*: Wins
- Bill Masterton Memorial Trophy: 1
- General Manager of the Year Award: 1
- Jack Adams Award: 2
- King Clancy Memorial Trophy: 1
- Lester Patrick Trophy: 1
- Mark Messier Leadership Award: 1

Total
- Awards won: 7

This is a list of Arizona Coyotes award winners.

== League awards ==
=== Team trophies ===
The Arizona Coyotes have not won any of the team trophies the National Hockey League (NHL) awards annually — the Stanley Cup as league champions, the Clarence S. Campbell Bowl as Western Conference playoff champions and the Presidents' Trophy as the team with the most regular season points.

=== Individual awards ===
Individual awards won by Arizona Coyotes players and staff
Award	Description	Winner	Season	References
Bill Masterton Memorial Trophy	Perseverance, sportsmanship and dedication to hockey	Connor Ingram	2023–24	
General Manager of the Year Award	Top general manager	Don Maloney	2009–10	
Jack Adams Award	Top coach during the regular season	Bobby Francis	2001–02	
Jack Adams Award	Top coach during the regular season	Dave Tippett	2009–10	
King Clancy Memorial Trophy	Leadership qualities on and off the ice and humanitarian contributions within their community	Shane Doan	2009–10	
Mark Messier Leadership Award	Player who exemplifies leadership on and off the ice	Shane Doan	2011–12	

=== NHL first and second team All-Stars ===
The NHL first and second team All-Stars are the top players at each position as voted on by the Professional Hockey Writers' Association.

Arizona Coyotes franchise players selected to the NHL First and Second Team All-Stars
Player	Position	Selections	Season	Team
Ilya Bryzgalov	Goaltender	1	2009–10	2nd
Ray Whitney	Left wing	1	2011–12	2nd

=== NHL All-Rookie Team ===
The NHL All-Rookie Team consists of the top rookies at each position as voted on by the Professional Hockey Writers' Association.

Arizona Coyotes franchise players selected to the NHL All-Rookie Team
Player	Position	Season
Logan Cooley	Forward	2023–24
Clayton Keller	Forward	2017–18
Matias Maccelli	Forward	2022–23

==== NHL All-Star Game selections ====
The National Hockey League All-Star Game is a mid-season exhibition game held annually between many of the top players of each season. Thirty-three All-Star Games have been held since the Arizona Coyotes entered the NHL in 1996, with at least one player chosen to represent the Coyotes in each year except 2003. The All-Star game has not been held in various years: 1979 and 1987 due to the 1979 Challenge Cup and Rendez-vous '87 series between the NHL and the Soviet national team, respectively, 1995, 2005, and 2013 as a result of labor stoppages, 2006, 2010, and 2014 because of the Winter Olympic Games, and 2021 as a result of the COVID-19 pandemic. The franchise has yet to host one of the games.

- † Selected by fan vote
- ‡ Selected by Commissioner
- ↑ All-Star Game Most Valuable Player

Arizona Coyotes franchise players and coaches selected to the NHL All-Star Game
Game	Year	Name	Position	References
47th	1997	Keith Tkachuk	Left wing	
47th	1997	Oleg Tverdovsky	Defense	
48th	1998	Nikolai Khabibulin	Goaltender	
48th	1998	Keith Tkachuk	Left wing	
49th	1999	Nikolai Khabibulin	Goaltender	
49th	1999	Teppo Numminen	Defense	
49th	1999	Jeremy Roenick	Center	
49th	1999	Jim Schoenfeld	Assistant coach	
49th	1999	Keith Tkachuk	Left wing	
50th	2000	Teppo Numminen	Defense	
50th	2000	Jeremy Roenick	Center	
51st	2001	Sean Burke	Goaltender	
51st	2001	Teppo Numminen	Defense	
52nd	2002	Sean Burke	Goaltender	
53rd	2003	No Coyotes selected	—	
54th	2004	Shane Doan	Right wing	
55th	2007	Ed Jovanovski	Defense	
55th	2007	Yanic Perreault	Center	
56th	2008	Ed Jovanovski	Defense	
57th	2009	Shane Doan	Left wing	
58th	2011	Keith Yandle	Defense	
59th	2012	Keith Yandle	Defense	
60th	2015	Oliver Ekman-Larsson	Defense	
61st	2016	John Scott† (Note: Scott was voted in as a member of the Arizona Coyotes. A trade on January 15 saw Scott moved to the Montreal Canadiens, and sent down to their AHL affiliate. On January 19, the NHL announced it would allow Scott to captain the Pacific Division All-Stars, despite no longer playing for a Pacific Division team (or even an NHL team). However, as a result of the trade, Scott wore a generic jersey, and was not a representative for Arizona; Arizona, as a result of trading away its only All-Star, was the only team not represented in the events.)↑	Left wing	
62nd	2017	Mike Smith	Goaltender	
63rd	2018	Oliver Ekman-Larsson	Defense	
64th	2019	Clayton Keller	Center	
65th	2020	Darcy Kuemper (Did not play)	Goaltender	
65th	2020	Rick Tocchet (Note: Gerard Gallant was originally named head coach of the Pacific Division All-Star team on January 2, but was fired by the Vegas Golden Knights on January 15. Tocchet, whose Coyotes lead the Pacific Division as of January 16, was named the replacement.)	Head Coach	
66th	2022	Clayton Keller	Center	
67th	2023	Clayton Keller	Center	
68th	2024	Clayton Keller	Center	

== Career achievements ==
=== Hockey Hall of Fame ===
The following is a list of Arizona Coyotes who have been enshrined in the Hockey Hall of Fame.

Arizona Coyotes franchise players and personnel inducted into the Hockey Hall of Fame
Individual	Category	Year inducted	Years with Coyotes in category	References
Cliff Fletcher	Builder	2004	2000–2007	
Mike Gartner	Player	2001	1996–1998	
Brett Hull	Player	2009	2005	
Jeremy Roenick	Player	2024	1996–2001, 2006–2007	
Keith Tkachuk	Player	2026	1996–2001	

=== Foster Hewitt Memorial Award ===
One member of the Coyotes organization has been honored with the Foster Hewitt Memorial Award. The award is presented by the Hockey Hall of Fame to members of the radio and television industry who make outstanding contributions to their profession and the game of ice hockey during their broadcasting career.

Members of the Arizona Coyotes honored with the Foster Hewitt Memorial Award
Individual	Year honored	Years with Coyotes as broadcaster	References
Dave Strader	2017	2007–2011	

=== Lester Patrick Trophy ===
The Lester Patrick Trophy has been presented by the National Hockey League and USA Hockey since 1966 to honor a recipient's contribution to ice hockey in the United States. This list includes all personnel who have ever been employed by the Arizona Coyotes in any capacity and have also received the Lester Patrick Trophy.

Members of the Arizona Coyotes honored with the Lester Patrick Trophy
Individual	Year honored	Years with Coyotes	References
Wayne Gretzky	1994	2000–2009	

=== Retired numbers ===
The Arizona Coyotes have retired one of their jersey numbers. Bobby Hull's number 9 (February 19, 1989) and Thomas Steen's number 25 (May 6, 1995) were retired while the franchise was in Winnipeg. Hull's number was un-retired by his request prior to the 2005–06 season so his son Brett could wear it. Both numbers were returned to circulation during the 2014–15 season. Also out of circulation is the number 99 which was retired league-wide for Wayne Gretzky on February 6, 2000. Gretzky did not play for the Coyotes franchise during his 20-year NHL career and no Coyotes player had ever worn the number 99 prior to its retirement.

Arizona Coyotes retired numbers
Number	Player	Position	Years with Coyotes as a player	Date of ceremony	References
19	Shane Doan	Right wing	1996–2017	February 24, 2019	

=== Coyotes' Ring of Honor ===
Seven numbers are honored via the induction of players into the Coyotes' Ring of Honor. Bobby Hull and Wayne Gretzky, then entering his first season as head coach of the Coyotes, were the first two players inducted into the Coyotes' Ring of Honor on October 8, 2005.

Arizona Coyotes' Ring of Honor
Number	Player	Position	Years with Coyotes franchise as a player	Date of ceremony	References
7	Keith Tkachuk	Left wing	1992–2001	December 23, 2011	
9	Bobby Hull	Left wing	1972–1980	October 8, 2005	
10	Dale Hawerchuk	Center	1981–1990	April 5, 2007	
25	Thomas Steen	Center	1981–1995	January 21, 2006	
27	Teppo Numminen	Defense	1988–2003	January 30, 2010	
97	Jeremy Roenick	Center	1996–2001, 2006–2007	February 11, 2012	
99	Wayne Gretzky	Center	—	October 8, 2005	

== Team awards ==
=== Beth Champie Memorial Award ===
The Beth Champie Memorial Award was an annual award given to the player "who demonstrates the most dedication to the fans throughout the season." It was last awarded in 2011.

- 2007–08 – Derek Morris
- 2008–09 – Shane Doan
- 2009–10 – Keith Yandle
- 2010–11 – Paul Bissonnette

=== Jukka Nieminen Memorial Trophy ===
The Jukka Nieminen Memorial Trophy was an annual award given to the hardest working player as determined by the fans.

- 1996–97 – Dallas Drake
- 1997–98 – Dallas Drake
- 1998–99 – Rick Tocchet
- 1999–00 – Shane Doan
- 2000–01 – Mike Sullivan
- 2001–02 – Shane Doan
- 2002–03 – Shane Doan
- 2003–04 – Cale Hulse
- 2005–06 – Keith Ballard
- 2006–07 – Keith Ballard
- 2007–08 – Shane Doan
- 2008–09 – Zbynek Michalek
- 2009–10 – Vernon Fiddler
- 2010–11 – Lauri Korpikoski
- 2011–12 – Shane Doan
- 2012–13 – Boyd Gordon
- 2013–14 – Antoine Vermette
- 2014–15 – Tobias Rieder
- 2015–16 – Jordan Martinook
- 2016–17 – Jordan Martinook
- 2017–18 – Nick Cousins
- 2018–19 – Niklas Hjalmarsson
- 2019–20 – Conor Garland
- 2020–21 – Conor Garland
- 2021–22 – Liam O'Brien
- 2022–23 – Jack McBain
- 2023–24 – J.J. Moser

=== Leading Scorer Award ===
The Leading Scorer Award was an annual award given to the team's leading scorer during the regular season.

- 1996–97 – Keith Tkachuk
- 1997–98 – Keith Tkachuk
- 1998–99 – Jeremy Roenick
- 1999–00 – Jeremy Roenick
- 2000–01 – Jeremy Roenick
- 2001–02 – Daymond Langkow
- 2002–03 – Mike Johnson
- 2003–04 – Shane Doan
- 2005–06 – Shane Doan
- 2006–07 – Shane Doan
- 2007–08 – Shane Doan
- 2008–09 – Shane Doan
- 2009–10 – Wojtek Wolski
- 2010–11 – Shane Doan
- 2011–12 – Ray Whitney
- 2012–13 – Keith Yandle
- 2013–14 – Keith Yandle
- 2014–15 – Oliver Ekman-Larsson
- 2015–16 – Oliver Ekman-Larsson
- 2016–17 – Radim Vrbata
- 2017–18 – Clayton Keller
- 2018–19 – Clayton Keller
- 2019–20 – Nick Schmaltz
- 2020–21 – Phil Kessel
- 2021–22 – Clayton Keller
- 2022–23 – Clayton Keller
- 2023–24 – Clayton Keller

=== Man of the Year Award ===
The Man of the Year Award was an annual award given for a player's "dedication, commitment and passion for bettering the lives of those in the community."

- 1996–97 – Kris King
- 1997–98 – Jim McKenzie
- 1998–99 – Jeremy Roenick
- 1999–00 – Jeremy Roenick
- 2000–01 – Brad May
- 2001–02 – Landon Wilson
- 2002–03 – Landon Wilson
- 2003–04 – Shane Doan and Tyson Nash
- 2005–06 – Keith Ballard and Fredrik Sjostrom
- 2006–07 – Josh Gratton
- 2007–08 – Derek Morris
- 2008–09 – Kurt Sauer
- 2009–10 – Jim Vandermeer
- 2010–11 – Vernon Fiddler
- 2011–12 – Jason LaBarbera
- 2012–13 – Paul Bissonnette
- 2013–14 – David Moss
- 2014–15 – Michael Stone
- 2015–16 – Michael Stone
- 2016–17 – Oliver Ekman-Larsson
- 2017–18 – Oliver Ekman-Larsson
- 2018–19 – Oliver Ekman-Larsson
- 2019–20 – Oliver Ekman-Larsson
- 2020–21 – Oliver Ekman-Larsson
- 2021–22 – Lawson Crouse
- 2022–23 – Travis Boyd
- 2023–24 – Nick Bjugstad

=== Team MVP Award ===
The Team MVP Award was an annual award given to the team's Most Valuable Player as determined by Coyotes broadcast media and beat writers from The Arizona Republic and FoxSportsArizona.com.

- 1996–97 – Keith Tkachuk
- 1997–98 – Keith Tkachuk
- 1998–99 – Nikolai Khabibulin
- 1999–00 – Jeremy Roenick
- 2000–01 – Sean Burke
- 2001–02 – Sean Burke
- 2002–03 – Mike Johnson
- 2003–04 – Shane Doan
- 2005–06 – Curtis Joseph
- 2006–07 – Shane Doan
- 2007–08 – Shane Doan
- 2008–09 – Shane Doan
- 2009–10 – Ilya Bryzgalov
- 2010–11 – Ilya Bryzgalov
- 2011–12 – Mike Smith
- 2012–13 – Oliver Ekman-Larsson
- 2013–14 – Antoine Vermette
- 2014–15 – Oliver Ekman-Larsson
- 2015–16 – Oliver Ekman-Larsson
- 2016–17 – Radim Vrbata
- 2017–18 – Clayton Keller
- 2018–19 – Darcy Kuemper
- 2019–20 – Darcy Kuemper
- 2020–21 – Jakob Chychrun
- 2021–22 – Clayton Keller
- 2022–23 – Clayton Keller
- 2023–24 – Clayton Keller

=== Three-Star Award ===
The Three-Star Award was an annual award given to the player who earned the most points from Star of the game selections throughout the regular season.

- 1996–97 – Keith Tkachuk
- 1997–98 – Keith Tkachuk
- 1998–99 – Keith Tkachuk
- 1999–00 – Keith Tkachuk
- 2000–01 – Sean Burke
- 2001–02 – Sean Burke
- 2002–03 – Ladislav Nagy
- 2003–04 – Shane Doan
- 2005–06 – Curtis Joseph
- 2006–07 – Shane Doan
- 2007–08 – Ilya Bryzgalov
- 2008–09 – Shane Doan
- 2009–10 – Ilya Bryzgalov
- 2010–11 – Ilya Bryzgalov
- 2011–12 – Mike Smith
- 2012–13 – Mike Smith
- 2013–14 – Mike Smith
- 2014–15 – Mike Smith
- 2015–16 – Shane Doan
- 2016–17 – Mike Smith
- 2017–18 – Clayton Keller
- 2018–19 – Darcy Kuemper
- 2019–20 – Darcy Kuemper
- 2020–21 – Phil Kessel
- 2021–22 – Karel Vejmelka
- 2022–23 – Clayton Keller
- 2023–24 – Connor Ingram

== Other awards and honors ==
This section is for awards and honors not associated with the Arizona Coyotes, National Hockey League, or Hockey Hall of Fame.

=== United States Hockey Hall of Fame ===
This is a list of Coyotes personnel who have been inducted into the United States Hockey Hall of Fame.

- 2009 – Tony Amonte
- 2010 – Jeremy Roenick
- 2011 – Keith Tkachuk
- 2015 – Mathieu Schneider
- 2016 – Craig Janney
- 2026 – Phil Kessel

== See also ==
- List of National Hockey League awards
