= 1998–99 Phoenix Coyotes season =

NHL hockey team season

1998–99 Phoenix Coyotes
- Division: 2nd Pacific
- Conference: 4th Western
- 1998–99 record: 39–31–12
- Home record: 23–13–5
- Road record: 16–18–7
- Goals for: 205
- Goals against: 197

Team information
- General manager: Bobby Smith
- Coach: Jim Schoenfeld
- Captain: Keith Tkachuk
- Arena: America West Arena
- Average attendance: 15,547
- Minor league affiliates: Springfield Falcons; Las Vegas Thunder; Mississippi Sea Wolves

Team leaders
- Goals: Keith Tkachuk (36)
- Assists: Jeremy Roenick (48)
- Points: Jeremy Roenick (72)
- Penalty minutes: Jim Cummins (190)
- Plus/minus: Keith Tkachuk (+22)
- Wins: Nikolai Khabibulin (32)
- Goals against average: Nikolai Khabibulin (2.13)

The 1998–99 Phoenix Coyotes season was the Coyotes' third season in Phoenix, the franchise's 20th season in the NHL and 27th overall. The Coyotes qualified for the playoffs for the fourth consecutive season, but they were upset in the Western Conference Quarterfinals by the St. Louis Blues, losing in seven games after being up three games to one. It was the third time in the decade that the Jets/Coyotes had blown a three games to one series lead. The first coming in 1990 and the other coming in 1992.

== Regular season ==
=== Final standings ===
Pacific Division
R	CR		GP	W	L	T	GF	GA	Pts
1	1	**Dallas Stars**	82	51	19	12	236	168	114
2	4	**Phoenix Coyotes**	82	39	31	12	205	197	90
3	6	**Mighty Ducks of Anaheim**	82	35	34	13	215	206	83
4	7	**San Jose Sharks**	82	31	33	18	196	191	80
5	11	Los Angeles Kings	82	32	45	5	189	222	69

Note: CR = Conference rank; GP = Games played; W = Wins; L = Losses; T = Ties; GF = Goals for; GA = Goals against; Pts = Points
Bolded teams qualified for the playoffs.

Western Conference
R		Div	GP	W	L	T	GF	GA	Pts
**1**	**p – Dallas Stars**	**PAC**	**82**	**51**	**19**	**12**	**236**	**168**	**114**
**2**	**y – Colorado Avalanche**	**NW**	**82**	**44**	**28**	**10**	**239**	**205**	**98**
**3**	**y – Detroit Red Wings**	**CEN**	**82**	**43**	**32**	**7**	**245**	**202**	**93**
**4**	**Phoenix Coyotes**	**PAC**	**82**	**39**	**31**	**12**	**205**	**197**	**90**
**5**	**St. Louis Blues**	**CEN**	**82**	**37**	**32**	**13**	**237**	**209**	**87**
**6**	**Mighty Ducks of Anaheim**	**PAC**	**82**	**35**	**34**	**13**	**215**	**206**	**83**
**7**	**San Jose Sharks**	**PAC**	**82**	**31**	**33**	**18**	**196**	**191**	**80**
**8**	**Edmonton Oilers**	**NW**	**82**	**33**	**37**	**12**	**230**	**226**	**78**
9	Calgary Flames	NW	82	30	40	12	211	234	72
10	Chicago Blackhawks	CEN	82	29	41	12	202	248	70
11	Los Angeles Kings	PAC	82	32	45	5	189	222	69
12	Nashville Predators	CEN	82	28	47	7	190	261	63
13	Vancouver Canucks	NW	82	23	47	12	192	258	58

Divisions: CEN – Central, PAC – Pacific, NW – Northwest

bold – Qualified for playoffs; p – Won Presidents' Trophy; y – Won division

== Playoffs ==
The series started in Phoenix. Game 1 was won by St. Louis by a score of 3–1. In Game 2, the Coyotes won 4–3 in overtime. In St. Louis, Phoenix won both Games 3 and 4 — Game 3 was won by a score of 5–4 and Game 4 was won by a score of 2–1. Game 5 shifted back to Phoenix, where St. Louis won 2–1 in overtime. Game 6 went back to St. Louis, where the Blues won 5–3. In Game 7, St. Louis won 1–0 in overtime in Phoenix, winning the series 4–3.

== Schedule and results ==
=== Regular season ===
1998–99 regular season
October: 4–2–1 (home: 2–1–0; road: 2–1–1)

Game	Date	Score	Opponent	Record	Recap
1	October 11, 1998	1–4	Ottawa Senators (1998–99)	0–1–0	L
2	October 15, 1998	5–2	Colorado Avalanche (1998–99)	1–1–0	W
3	October 19, 1998	3–1	Boston Bruins (1998–99)	2–1–0	W
4	October 22, 1998	1–2	@ Dallas Stars (1998–99)	2–2–0	L
5	October 25, 1998	2–2 OT	@ Mighty Ducks of Anaheim (1998–99)	2–2–1	T
6	October 26, 1998	5–1	@ Colorado Avalanche (1998–99)	3–2–1	W
7	October 28, 1998	4–2	@ San Jose Sharks (1998–99)	4–2–1	W

November: 10–0–1 (home: 6–0–1; road: 4–0–0)

Game	Date	Score	Opponent	Record	Recap
8	November 1, 1998	3–0	@ Los Angeles Kings (1998–99)	5–2–1	W
9	November 6, 1998	3–1	Detroit Red Wings (1998–99)	6–2–1	W
10	November 10, 1998	1–1 OT	Colorado Avalanche (1998–99)	6–2–2	T
11	November 11, 1998	2–0	@ Dallas Stars (1998–99)	7–2–2	W
12	November 14, 1998	4–1	Tampa Bay Lightning (1998–99)	8–2–2	W
13	November 18, 1998	4–2	Vancouver Canucks (1998–99)	9–2–2	W
14	November 20, 1998	2–1 OT	@ San Jose Sharks (1998–99)	10–2–2	W
15	November 21, 1998	3–2 OT	Edmonton Oilers (1998–99)	11–2–2	W
16	November 24, 1998	3–2	Chicago Blackhawks (1998–99)	12–2–2	W
17	November 26, 1998	3–2	New Jersey Devils (1998–99)	13–2–2	W
18	November 28, 1998	4–0	@ Los Angeles Kings (1998–99)	14–2–2	W

December: 7–5–2 (home: 3–1–0; road: 4–4–2)

Game	Date	Score	Opponent	Record	Recap
19	December 2, 1998	3–4	@ Edmonton Oilers (1998–99)	14–3–2	L
20	December 5, 1998	3–2	@ Calgary Flames (1998–99)	15–3–2	W
21	December 6, 1998	3–3 OT	@ Vancouver Canucks (1998–99)	15–3–3	T
22	December 9, 1998	4–2	Montreal Canadiens (1998–99)	16–3–3	W
23	December 12, 1998	2–0	@ Ottawa Senators (1998–99)	17–3–3	W
24	December 14, 1998	2–2 OT	@ Montreal Canadiens (1998–99)	17–3–4	T
25	December 16, 1998	2–5	@ Toronto Maple Leafs (1998–99)	17–4–4	L
26	December 17, 1998	2–3	@ St. Louis Blues (1998–99)	17–5–4	L
27	December 20, 1998	4–2	New York Islanders (1998–99)	18–5–4	W
28	December 22, 1998	6–2	@ Detroit Red Wings (1998–99)	19–5–4	W
29	December 23, 1998	3–4	@ Chicago Blackhawks (1998–99)	19–6–4	L
30	December 26, 1998	2–1	@ Los Angeles Kings (1998–99)	20–6–4	W
31	December 28, 1998	2–4	Los Angeles Kings (1998–99)	20–7–4	L
32	December 30, 1998	3–1	New York Rangers (1998–99)	21–7–4	W

January: 4–5–5 (home: 3–2–2; road: 1–3–3)

Game	Date	Score	Opponent	Record	Recap
33	January 1, 1999	1–2 OT	Dallas Stars (1998–99)	21–8–4	L
34	January 5, 1999	2–2 OT	Florida Panthers (1998–99)	21–8–5	T
35	January 7, 1999	1–7	Edmonton Oilers (1998–99)	21–9–5	L
36	January 8, 1999	1–4	@ Mighty Ducks of Anaheim (1998–99)	21–10–5	L
37	January 11, 1999	1–0	Buffalo Sabres (1998–99)	22–10–5	W
38	January 13, 1999	5–3	Pittsburgh Penguins (1998–99)	23–10–5	W
39	January 15, 1999	0–2	@ Nashville Predators (1998–99)	23–11–5	L
40	January 17, 1999	1–1 OT	@ Chicago Blackhawks (1998–99)	23–11–6	T
41	January 19, 1999	4–2	St. Louis Blues (1998–99)	24–11–6	W
42	January 21, 1999	3–3 OT	Mighty Ducks of Anaheim (1998–99)	24–11–7	T
43	January 26, 1999	1–1 OT	@ Buffalo Sabres (1998–99)	24–11–8	T
44	January 28, 1999	2–4	@ Philadelphia Flyers (1998–99)	24–12–8	L
45	January 29, 1999	4–4 OT	@ New York Islanders (1998–99)	24–12–9	T
46	January 31, 1999	5–1	@ Nashville Predators (1998–99)	25–12–9	W

February: 5–8–1 (home: 3–3–1; road: 2–5–0)

Game	Date	Score	Opponent	Record	Recap
47	February 2, 1999	2–2 OT	Calgary Flames (1998–99)	25–12–10	T
48	February 4, 1999	3–1	San Jose Sharks (1998–99)	26–12–10	W
49	February 6, 1999	3–0	Chicago Blackhawks (1998–99)	27–12–10	W
50	February 8, 1999	0–3	San Jose Sharks (1998–99)	27–13–10	L
51	February 10, 1999	3–0	Los Angeles Kings (1998–99)	28–13–10	W
52	February 13, 1999	4–1	@ Colorado Avalanche (1998–99)	29–13–10	W
53	February 14, 1999	1–5	Mighty Ducks of Anaheim (1998–99)	29–14–10	L
54	February 16, 1999	1–4	Philadelphia Flyers (1998–99)	29–15–10	L
55	February 19, 1999	2–4	@ Tampa Bay Lightning (1998–99)	29–16–10	L
56	February 20, 1999	1–7	@ Florida Panthers (1998–99)	29–17–10	L
57	February 22, 1999	1–4	@ Pittsburgh Penguins (1998–99)	29–18–10	L
58	February 24, 1999	2–1	@ Washington Capitals (1998–99)	30–18–10	W
59	February 26, 1999	0–3	@ New York Rangers (1998–99)	30–19–10	L
60	February 28, 1999	1–4	@ New Jersey Devils (1998–99)	30–20–10	L

March: 7–6–2 (home: 5–3–1; road: 2–3–1)

Game	Date	Score	Opponent	Record	Recap
61	March 2, 1999	2–3	@ Boston Bruins (1998–99)	30–21–10	L
62	March 5, 1999	2–7	Detroit Red Wings (1998–99)	30–22–10	L
63	March 7, 1999	4–3	Nashville Predators (1998–99)	31–22–10	W
64	March 9, 1999	2–4	@ San Jose Sharks (1998–99)	31–23–10	L
65	March 11, 1999	0–3	Vancouver Canucks (1998–99)	31–24–10	L
66	March 13, 1999	1–0	Mighty Ducks of Anaheim (1998–99)	32–24–10	W
67	March 15, 1999	5–5 OT	Carolina Hurricanes (1998–99)	32–24–11	T
68	March 17, 1999	4–3	@ Detroit Red Wings (1998–99)	33–24–11	W
69	March 18, 1999	2–2 OT	@ St. Louis Blues (1998–99)	33–24–12	T
70	March 21, 1999	4–1	Los Angeles Kings (1998–99)	34–24–12	W
71	March 23, 1999	2–3	Dallas Stars (1998–99)	34–25–12	L
72	March 25, 1999	4–2	Washington Capitals (1998–99)	35–25–12	W
73	March 27, 1999	2–1	Calgary Flames (1998–99)	36–25–12	W
74	March 29, 1999	0–1	@ Vancouver Canucks (1998–99)	36–26–12	L
75	March 30, 1999	7–4	@ Edmonton Oilers (1998–99)	37–26–12	W

April: 2–5–0 (home: 1–3–0; road: 1–2–0)

Game	Date	Score	Opponent	Record	Recap
76	April 1, 1999	4–1	@ Calgary Flames (1998–99)	38–26–12	W
77	April 6, 1999	0–1	San Jose Sharks (1998–99)	38–27–12	L
78	April 9, 1999	3–4	Nashville Predators (1998–99)	38–28–12	L
79	April 11, 1999	0–3	@ Mighty Ducks of Anaheim (1998–99)	38–29–12	L
80	April 14, 1999	2–4	@ Dallas Stars (1998–99)	38–30–12	L
81	April 15, 1999	4–6	St. Louis Blues (1998–99)	38–31–12	L
82	April 17, 1999	2–0	Dallas Stars (1998–99)	39–31–12	W

Legend: W Win (2 points) L Loss (0 points) T Tie (1 point)

=== Playoffs ===
1999 Stanley Cup playoffs
Western Conference Quarterfinals vs. (5) St. Louis Blues – Blues win 4–3

Game	Date	Score	Opponent	Series	Recap
1	April 22, 1999	1–3	St. Louis Blues	Blues lead 1–0	L
2	April 24, 1999	4–3 OT	St. Louis Blues	Series tied 1–1	W
3	April 25, 1999	5–4	@ St. Louis Blues	Coyotes lead 2–1	W
4	April 27, 1999	2–1	@ St. Louis Blues	Coyotes lead 3–1	W
5	April 30, 1999	1–2 OT	St. Louis Blues	Coyotes lead 3–2	L
6	May 2, 1999	3–5	@ St. Louis Blues	Series tied 3–3	L
7	May 4, 1999	0–1 OT	St. Louis Blues	Blues win 4–3	L

Legend: W Win L Loss

== Player statistics ==
=== Scoring ===
- Position abbreviations: C = Center; D = Defense; G = Goaltender; LW = Left wing; RW = Right wing
- † = Joined team via a transaction (e.g., trade, waivers, signing) during the season. Stats reflect time with the Coyotes only.
- ‡ = Left team via a transaction (e.g., trade, waivers, release) during the season. Stats reflect time with the Coyotes only.

No.	Player	Pos	Regular season						Playoffs					
No.	Player	Pos	GP	G	A	Pts	+/-	PIM	GP	G	A	Pts	+/-	PIM
97	Jeremy Roenick	C	78	24	48	72	7	130	1	0	0	0	−1	0
7	Keith Tkachuk	LW	68	36	32	68	22	151	7	1	3	4	−4	13
22	Rick Tocchet	RW	81	26	30	56	5	147	7	0	3	3	−3	8
17	Greg Adams	LW	75	19	24	43	−1	26	3	1	0	1	1	0
27	Teppo Numminen	D	82	10	30	40	3	30	7	2	1	3	−5	4
11	Dallas Drake	RW	53	9	22	31	17	65	7	4	3	7	3	4
20	Jyrki Lumme	D	60	7	21	28	5	34	7	0	1	1	−2	6
10	Oleg Tverdovsky	D	82	7	18	25	11	32	6	0	2	2	3	6
36	Juha Ylonen	C	59	6	17	23	18	20	2	0	2	2	2	2
8	Daniel Briere	C	64	8	14	22	−3	30	—	—	—	—	—	—
19	Shane Doan	RW	79	6	16	22	−5	54	7	2	2	4	4	6
21	Bob Corkum	C	77	9	10	19	−9	17	7	0	1	1	1	4
14	Mike Stapleton	C	76	9	9	18	−7	34	7	1	0	1	−1	0
3	Keith Carney	D	82	2	14	16	15	62	7	1	2	3	5	10
16	Robert Reichel†	C	13	7	6	13	2	4	7	1	3	4	−2	2
5	Deron Quint	D	60	5	8	13	−10	20	—	—	—	—	—	—
16	Brad Isbister‡	LW	32	4	4	8	1	46	—	—	—	—	—	—
15	Jim Cummins	RW	55	1	7	8	3	190	3	0	1	1	1	0
77	Cliff Ronning‡	C	7	2	5	7	3	2	—	—	—	—	—	—
33	J. J. Daigneault†	D	35	0	7	7	−8	32	6	0	0	0	−1	8
26	Mike Sullivan	C	63	2	4	6	−11	24	5	0	0	0	0	2
50	Trevor Letowski	RW	14	2	2	4	1	2	—	—	—	—	—	—
47	Tavis Hansen	RW	20	2	1	3	−4	12	2	0	0	0	1	0
12	Rob Murray	C	13	1	2	3	2	4	—	—	—	—	—	—
23	Steve Leach†	RW	22	1	1	2	−6	37	7	1	1	2	0	2
4	Gerald Diduck	D	44	0	2	2	9	72	3	0	0	0	−1	2
55	Jason Doig‡	D	9	0	1	1	2	10	—	—	—	—	—	—
6	Jamie Huscroft†	D	11	0	1	1	−1	27	—	—	—	—	—	—
24	Stan Neckar†	D	11	0	1	1	3	10	6	0	1	1	3	4
29	Louie DeBrusk	LW	15	0	0	0	−2	34	6	2	0	2	−1	6
49	Joe Dziedzic	LW	2	0	0	0	−2	0	—	—	—	—	—	—
42	Robert Esche	G	3	0	0	0		0	—	—	—	—	—	—
48	Sean Gagnon	D	2	0	0	0	−2	7	—	—	—	—	—	—
2	Bryan Helmer‡	D	11	0	0	0	2	23	—	—	—	—	—	—
46	Jean-Francois Jomphe‡	C	1	0	0	0	0	2	—	—	—	—	—	—
35	Nikolai Khabibulin	G	63	0	0	0		8	7	0	0	0		2
31	Scott Langkow	G	1	0	0	0		0	—	—	—	—	—	—
18 (Note: Noonan wore number 12 in his first game.)	Brian Noonan†	RW	7	0	0	0	−3	0	5	0	2	2	2	4
30	Mikhail Shtalenkov†	G	4	0	0	0		0	—	—	—	—	—	—
39	Brad Tiley	D	8	0	0	0	−1	0	1	0	0	0	0	0
44	Andrei Vasilyev	LW	1	0	0	0	−2	0	—	—	—	—	—	—
28	Jimmy Waite	G	16	0	0	0		2	—	—	—	—	—	—

=== Goaltending ===
- † = Joined team via a transaction (e.g., trade, waivers, signing) during the season. Stats reflect time with the Coyotes only.

No.	Player	Regular season										Playoffs								
No.	Player	GP	W	L	T	SA	GA	GAA	SV%	SO	TOI	GP	W	L	SA	GA	GAA	SV%	SO	TOI
35	Nikolai Khabibulin	63	32	23	7	1681	130	2.13	.923	8	3657	7	3	4	236	18	2.41	.924	0	449
28	Jimmy Waite	16	6	5	4	390	41	2.74	.895	1	898	—	—	—	—	—	—	—	—	—
30	Mikhail Shtalenkov†	4	1	2	1	104	9	2.22	.913	0	243	—	—	—	—	—	—	—	—	—
42	Robert Esche	3	0	1	0	50	7	3.23	.860	0	130	—	—	—	—	—	—	—	—	—
31	Scott Langkow	1	0	0	0	17	3	5.14	.824	0	35	—	—	—	—	—	—	—	—	—

== Awards and records ==
=== Awards ===
Type	Award/honor	Recipient	Ref
League (in-season)	NHL All-Star Game selection	Nikolai Khabibulin	
League (in-season)	NHL All-Star Game selection	Teppo Numminen	
League (in-season)	NHL All-Star Game selection	Jeremy Roenick	
League (in-season)	NHL All-Star Game selection	Jim Schoenfeld (coach)	
League (in-season)	NHL All-Star Game selection	Keith Tkachuk	
League (in-season)	NHL Player of the Week	Jimmy Waite (November 16)	
Team	Hardest Working Player Award	Rick Tocchet	
Team	Leading Scorer Award	Jeremy Roenick	
Team	Man of the Year Award	Jeremy Roenick	
Team	Team MVP Award	Nikolai Khabibulin	
Team	Three-Star Award	Keith Tkachuk	

=== Milestones ===
Milestone	Player	Date	Ref
First game	Bryan Helmer	October 11, 1998	
First game	Trevor Letowski	January 1, 1999	
First game	Robert Esche	February 20, 1999	
400th goal scored	Rick Tocchet	January 28, 1999	

== Transactions ==
=== Trades ===
June 30, 1998	To Nashville Predators Seventh-round pick in 1999 (Kyle Kettles)	To Phoenix Coyotes Mike Sullivan
October 31, 1998	To Nashville Predators Cliff Ronning; Richard Lintner	To Phoenix Coyotes Future Considerations
January 13, 1999	To Nashville Predators Future considerations	To Phoenix Coyotes J. J. Daigneault
March 8, 1999	To Vancouver Canucks Future considerations	To Phoenix Coyotes Jamie Huscroft
March 11, 1999	To Edmonton Oilers Fifth-round pick in 2000 (Matt Koalska)	To Phoenix Coyotes Mikhail Shtalenkov
March 20, 1999	To New York Islanders Brad Isbister; Third-round pick in 1999 (Brian Collins)	To Phoenix Coyotes Robert Reichel; Third-round pick in 1999 (Jason Jaspers); Fourth-round pick in 1999 (Preston Mizzi)
March 23, 1999	To Montreal Canadiens Jean-Francois Jomphe	To Phoenix Coyotes Cash
March 23, 1999	To New York Rangers Jason Doig; Sixth-round pick in 1999 (Jay Dardis)	To Phoenix Coyotes Stan Neckar
June 25, 1999	To Atlanta Thrashers Scott Langkow	To Phoenix Coyotes Future considerations
June 26, 1999	To Montreal Canadiens Jim Cummins	To Phoenix Coyotes Sixth-round pick in 1999 (Erik Lewerstrom)
June 26, 1999	To Mighty Ducks of Anaheim Oleg Tverdovsky	To Phoenix Coyotes Travis Green; First-round pick in 1999 (Scott Kelman)

=== Waivers ===
December 19, 1998	To St. Louis Blues Bryan Helmer

=== Free agents ===
Player	Former team
Jyrki Lumme	Vancouver Canucks
Bryan Helmer	New Jersey Devils
Andrei Vasilyev	New York Islanders
Mike Martone	Buffalo Sabres
Joe Dziedzic	Pittsburgh Penguins
Greg Adams	Dallas Stars
Stephen Leach	Ottawa Senators
Brian Noonan	Vancouver Canucks
David Cullen	Undrafted free agent

Player	New team
Mark Janssens	Chicago Blackhawks
Murray Baron	Vancouver Canucks
Ted Crowley	Colorado Avalanche
Scott Levins	Carolina Hurricanes
Kevin Dahl	Calgary Flames
Igor Korolev	Toronto Maple Leafs

== Draft picks ==
Phoenix's draft picks at the 1998 NHL entry draft held at the Marine Midland Arena in Buffalo, New York.

Round	#	Player	Nationality	College/Junior/Club team (League)
1	14	Patrick DesRochers	Canada	Sarnia Sting (OHL)
2	43	Ossi Vaananen	Finland	Jokerit (Finland)
3	73	Pat O'Leary	United States	Robbinsdale High School (USHS-MN)
4	100	Ryan Van Buskirk	Canada	Sarnia Sting (OHL)
5	115	Jay Leach	United States	Providence College (Hockey East)
5	116	Josh Blackburn	United States	Lincoln Stars (USHL)
5	129	Robert Schnabel	Czech Republic	Red Deer Rebels (WHL)
6	160	Rickard Wallin	Sweden	Farjestad BK Jr. (Sweden)
7	187	Erik Westrum	United States	University of Minnesota (WCHA)
8	214	Justin Hansen	Canada	Prince George Cougars (WHL)

== See also ==
- 1998–99 NHL season
