= 2002–03 Phoenix Coyotes season =

NHL hockey team season

2002–03 Phoenix Coyotes
- Division: 4th Pacific
- Conference: 11th Western
- 2002–03 record: 31–35–11–5
- Home record: 17–16–6–2
- Road record: 14–19–5–3
- Goals for: 204
- Goals against: 230

Team information
- General manager: Mike Barnett
- Coach: Bobby Francis
- Captain: Teppo Numminen
- Alternate captains: Shane Doan; Claude Lemieux (Oct.–Jan.)
- Arena: America West Arena
- Average attendance: 13,229
- Minor league affiliate: Springfield Falcons

Team leaders
- Goals: Mike Johnson (23)
- Assists: Mike Johnson (40)
- Points: Mike Johnson (63)
- Penalty minutes: Andrei Nazarov (135); Todd Simpson (135)
- Plus/minus: Daymond Langkow (+20)
- Wins: Brian Boucher (15)
- Goals against average: Sean Burke (2.12)

The 2002–03 Phoenix Coyotes season was their seventh season in the National Hockey League. The Coyotes failed to make the playoffs for the first time since the 2000–01 season.

== Regular season ==
- January 8, 2003: Chicago Blackhawks goaltender Michael Leighton earned a shutout in his NHL debut in a 0–0 tie against the Phoenix Coyotes. Coyotes goaltender Zac Bierk earned his first career shutout, although it was not his NHL debut. It was the first time that two goaltenders in the same game both earned their first career shutouts.

The Coyotes finished the regular season having allowed the most power-play goals of all 30 NHL teams, with 77.

=== Final standings ===
Pacific Division
No.	CR		GP	W	L	T	OTL	GF	GA	Pts
1	1	**Dallas Stars**	82	46	17	15	4	245	169	111
2	7	**Mighty Ducks of Anaheim**	82	40	27	9	6	203	193	95
3	10	Los Angeles Kings	82	33	37	6	6	203	221	78
4	11	Phoenix Coyotes	82	31	35	11	5	204	230	78
5	14	San Jose Sharks	82	28	37	9	8	214	239	73

Note: CR = Conference rank; GP = Games played; W = Wins; L = Losses; T = Ties; OTL = Overtime loss; GF = Goals for; GA = Goals against; Pts = Points
Bolded teams qualified for the playoffs.

Western Conference
R		Div	GP	W	L	T	OTL	GF	GA	Pts
**1**	**Z-** Dallas Stars	**PA**	**82**	**46**	**17**	**15**	**4**	**245**	**169**	111
**2**	**Y-** Detroit Red Wings	**CE**	**82**	**48**	**20**	**10**	**4**	**269**	**203**	110
**3**	**Y-** Colorado Avalanche	**NW**	**82**	**42**	**19**	**13**	**8**	**251**	**194**	105
**4**	**X-** Vancouver Canucks	**NW**	**82**	**45**	**23**	**13**	**1**	**264**	**208**	104
**5**	**X-** St. Louis Blues	**CE**	**82**	**41**	**24**	**11**	**6**	**253**	**222**	99
**6**	**X-** Minnesota Wild	**NW**	**82**	**42**	**29**	**10**	**1**	**198**	**178**	95
**7**	**X-** Mighty Ducks of Anaheim	**PA**	**82**	**40**	**27**	**9**	**6**	**203**	**193**	95
**8**	**X-** Edmonton Oilers	**NW**	**82**	**36**	**26**	**11**	**9**	**231**	**230**	92
8.5
9	Chicago Blackhawks	CE	82	30	33	13	6	207	226	79
10	Los Angeles Kings	PA	82	33	37	6	6	203	221	78
11	Phoenix Coyotes	PA	82	31	35	11	5	204	230	78
12	Calgary Flames	NW	82	29	36	13	4	186	228	75
13	Nashville Predators	CE	82	27	35	13	7	183	206	74
14	San Jose Sharks	PA	82	28	37	9	8	214	239	73
15	Columbus Blue Jackets	CE	82	29	42	8	3	213	263	69

Divisions: PA – Pacific, CE – Central, NW – Northwest

Z – Clinched conference; Y – Clinched division; X – Clinched playoff spot

== Schedule and results ==
2002–03 regular season
October: 4–7–0–1 (home: 0–3–0–0; road: 4–4–0–1)

Game	Date	Score	Opponent	Record	Recap
1	October 9, 2002	1–4	@ Los Angeles Kings (2002–03)	0–1–0–0	L
2	October 12, 2002	2–5	Dallas Stars (2002–03)	0–2–0–0	L
3	October 14, 2002	4–2	@ Columbus Blue Jackets (2002–03)	1–2–0–0	W
4	October 15, 2002	1–2	@ Ottawa Senators (2002–03)	1–3–0–0	L
5	October 17, 2002	3–5	@ Toronto Maple Leafs (2002–03)	1–4–0–0	L
6	October 19, 2002	3–2	@ Buffalo Sabres (2002–03)	2–4–0–0	W
7	October 22, 2002	2–1	@ Nashville Predators (2002–03)	3–4–0–0	W
8	October 24, 2002	2–3	Colorado Avalanche (2002–03)	3–5–0–0	L
9	October 26, 2002	1–6	Minnesota Wild (2002–03)	3–6–0–0	L
10	October 28, 2002	2–3 OT	@ New York Rangers (2002–03)	3–6–0–1	OTL
11	October 29, 2002	3–2	@ New York Islanders (2002–03)	4–6–0–1	W
12	October 31, 2002	2–6	@ Philadelphia Flyers (2002–03)	4–7–0–1	L

November: 4–5–4–0 (home: 2–2–3–0; road: 2–3–1–0)

Game	Date	Score	Opponent	Record	Recap
13	November 3, 2002	2–1 OT	Nashville Predators (2002–03)	5–7–0–1	W
14	November 7, 2002	4–1	Minnesota Wild (2002–03)	6–7–0–1	W
15	November 9, 2002	2–5	Vancouver Canucks (2002–03)	6–8–0–1	L
16	November 11, 2002	2–4	@ Tampa Bay Lightning (2002–03)	6–9–0–1	L
17	November 12, 2002	2–3	@ Carolina Hurricanes (2002–03)	6–10–0–1	L
18	November 15, 2002	5–1	@ Atlanta Thrashers (2002–03)	7–10–0–1	W
19	November 17, 2002	4–4 OT	Colorado Avalanche (2002–03)	7–10–1–1	T
20	November 20, 2002	2–2 OT	Dallas Stars (2002–03)	7–10–2–1	T
21	November 22, 2002	3–3 OT	Florida Panthers (2002–03)	7–10–3–1	T
22	November 25, 2002	1–5	@ Dallas Stars (2002–03)	7–11–3–1	L
23	November 27, 2002	2–2 OT	@ Mighty Ducks of Anaheim (2002–03)	7–11–4–1	T
24	November 28, 2002	2–4	Chicago Blackhawks (2002–03)	7–12–4–1	L
25	November 30, 2002	3–2	@ San Jose Sharks (2002–03)	8–12–4–1	W

December: 5–4–2–2 (home: 5–3–2–1; road: 0–1–0–1)

Game	Date	Score	Opponent	Record	Recap
26	December 3, 2002	2–3 OT	San Jose Sharks (2002–03)	8–12–4–2	OTL
27	December 5, 2002	3–5	Detroit Red Wings (2002–03)	8–13–4–2	L
28	December 7, 2002	2–4	Montreal Canadiens (2002–03)	8–14–4–2	L
29	December 9, 2002	3–3 OT	Columbus Blue Jackets (2002–03)	8–14–5–2	T
30	December 11, 2002	4–2	Atlanta Thrashers (2002–03)	9–14–5–2	W
31	December 13, 2002	3–4	Washington Capitals (2002–03)	9–15–5–2	L
32	December 15, 2002	2–1	Los Angeles Kings (2002–03)	10–15–5–2	W
33	December 17, 2002	5–2	Pittsburgh Penguins (2002–03)	11–15–5–2	W
34	December 20, 2002	3–3 OT	St. Louis Blues (2002–03)	11–15–6–2	T
35	December 22, 2002	0–4	@ Mighty Ducks of Anaheim (2002–03)	11–16–6–2	L
36	December 26, 2002	3–4 OT	@ Los Angeles Kings (2002–03)	11–16–6–3	OTL
37	December 28, 2002	4–0	Philadelphia Flyers (2002–03)	12–16–6–3	W
38	December 30, 2002	4–3 OT	Edmonton Oilers (2002–03)	13–16–6–3	W

January: 6–5–1–1 (home: 2–2–0–0; road: 4–3–1–1)

Game	Date	Score	Opponent	Record	Recap
39	January 1, 2003	2–1 OT	@ Washington Capitals (2002–03)	14–16–6–3	W
40	January 3, 2003	4–1	@ Detroit Red Wings (2002–03)	15–16–6–3	W
41	January 4, 2003	0–2	@ Columbus Blue Jackets (2002–03)	15–17–6–3	L
42	January 8, 2003	0–0 OT	@ Chicago Blackhawks (2002–03)	15–17–7–3	T
43	January 10, 2003	1–2	@ Minnesota Wild (2002–03)	15–18–7–3	L
44	January 11, 2003	3–4 OT	@ Nashville Predators (2002–03)	15–18–7–4	OTL
45	January 14, 2003	1–4	St. Louis Blues (2002–03)	15–19–7–4	L
46	January 18, 2003	0–1	Buffalo Sabres (2002–03)	15–20–7–4	L
47	January 20, 2003	3–1	San Jose Sharks (2002–03)	16–20–7–4	W
48	January 23, 2003	7–1	@ Calgary Flames (2002–03)	17–20–7–4	W
49	January 24, 2003	5–1	@ Edmonton Oilers (2002–03)	18–20–7–4	W
50	January 26, 2003	0–1	@ Vancouver Canucks (2002–03)	18–21–7–4	L
51	January 28, 2003	4–3	Calgary Flames (2002–03)	19–21–7–4	W

February: 6–5–1–0 (home: 3–3–0–0; road: 3–2–1–0)

Game	Date	Score	Opponent	Record	Recap
52	February 5, 2003	3–4	@ Los Angeles Kings (2002–03)	19–22–7–4	L
53	February 7, 2003	2–3	@ Mighty Ducks of Anaheim (2002–03)	19–23–7–4	L
54	February 8, 2003	1–3	Dallas Stars (2002–03)	19–24–7–4	L
55	February 12, 2003	0–3	New Jersey Devils (2002–03)	19–25–7–4	L
56	February 14, 2003	3–2	@ Minnesota Wild (2002–03)	20–25–7–4	W
57	February 15, 2003	5–3	@ St. Louis Blues (2002–03)	21–25–7–4	W
58	February 18, 2003	5–2	Columbus Blue Jackets (2002–03)	22–25–7–4	W
59	February 20, 2003	2–1	@ Chicago Blackhawks (2002–03)	23–25–7–4	W
60	February 21, 2003	2–2 OT	@ Dallas Stars (2002–03)	23–25–8–4	T
61	February 23, 2003	2–4	Calgary Flames (2002–03)	23–26–8–4	L
62	February 26, 2003	4–2	Carolina Hurricanes (2002–03)	24–26–8–4	W
63	February 28, 2003	3–1	Mighty Ducks of Anaheim (2002–03)	25–26–8–4	W

March: 5–9–1–1 (home: 4–3–0–1; road: 1–6–1–0)

Game	Date	Score	Opponent	Record	Recap
64	March 2, 2003	2–5	@ Detroit Red Wings (2002–03)	25–27–8–4	L
65	March 4, 2003	4–1	@ Pittsburgh Penguins (2002–03)	26–27–8–4	W
66	March 6, 2003	3–6	@ St. Louis Blues (2002–03)	26–28–8–4	L
67	March 8, 2003	6–4	San Jose Sharks (2002–03)	27–28–8–4	W
68	March 10, 2003	2–2 OT	@ Colorado Avalanche (2002–03)	27–28–9–4	T
69	March 12, 2003	2–3	Detroit Red Wings (2002–03)	27–29–9–4	L
70	March 14, 2003	0–4	Chicago Blackhawks (2002–03)	27–30–9–4	L
71	March 15, 2003	4–2	Mighty Ducks of Anaheim (2002–03)	28–30–9–4	W
72	March 18, 2003	2–1	Boston Bruins (2002–03)	29–30–9–4	W
73	March 20, 2003	3–2 OT	Edmonton Oilers (2002–03)	30–30–9–4	W
74	March 22, 2003	0–4	Tampa Bay Lightning (2002–03)	30–31–9–4	L
75	March 24, 2003	0–2	@ Calgary Flames (2002–03)	30–32–9–4	L
76	March 26, 2003	3–4	@ Edmonton Oilers (2002–03)	30–33–9–4	L
77	March 27, 2003	1–5	@ Vancouver Canucks (2002–03)	30–34–9–4	L
78	March 29, 2003	1–6	@ Colorado Avalanche (2002–03)	30–35–9–4	L
79	March 31, 2003	4–5 OT	Los Angeles Kings (2002–03)	30–35–9–5	OTL

April: 1–0–2–0 (home: 1–0–1–0; road: 0–0–1–0)

Game	Date	Score	Opponent	Record	Recap
80	April 2, 2003	3–3 OT	Vancouver Canucks (2002–03)	30–35–10–5	T
81	April 4, 2003	1–0	Nashville Predators (2002–03)	31–35–10–5	W
82	April 6, 2003	3–3 OT	@ San Jose Sharks (2002–03)	31–35–11–5	T

Legend: W Win (2 points) L Loss (0 points) T Tie (1 point) OTL Overtime loss (1 point)

== Player statistics ==
=== Scoring ===
- Position abbreviations: C = Center; D = Defense; G = Goaltender; LW = Left wing; RW = Right wing
- † = Joined team via a transaction (e.g., trade, waivers, signing) during the season. Stats reflect time with the Coyotes only.
- ‡ = Left team via a transaction (e.g., trade, waivers, release) during the season. Stats reflect time with the Coyotes only.

No.	Player	Pos	Regular season					
No.	Player	Pos	GP	G	A	Pts	+/-	PIM
12	Mike Johnson	RW	82	23	40	63	9	47
19	Shane Doan	RW	82	21	37	58	3	86
17	Ladislav Nagy	LW	80	22	35	57	17	92
11	Daymond Langkow	C	82	20	32	52	20	56
8	Daniel Briere‡	C	68	17	29	46	−21	50
10	Tony Amonte‡	RW	59	13	23	36	−12	26
27	Teppo Numminen	D	78	6	24	30	0	30
29	Branko Radivojevic	RW	79	12	15	27	−2	63
23	Paul Mara	D	73	10	15	25	−7	78
55	Danny Markov	D	64	4	16	20	2	36
34	Ramzi Abid‡	LW	30	10	8	18	1	30
7	Deron Quint†	D	51	7	10	17	−5	20
49	Brian Savage	LW	43	6	10	16	−4	22
22	Claude Lemieux‡	RW	36	6	8	14	−3	30
28	Landon Wilson	RW	31	6	8	14	1	26
16	Kelly Buchberger	RW	79	3	9	12	0	109
2	Todd Simpson	D	66	2	7	9	7	135
4	Ossi Vaananen	D	67	2	7	9	1	82
15	Radoslav Suchy	D	77	1	8	9	2	18
32	Brad May‡	LW	20	3	4	7	3	32
18	Paul Ranheim†	LW	40	3	4	7	−4	10
14	Jeff Taffe	C	20	3	1	4	−4	4
24	Jan Hrdina†	C	4	0	4	4	3	8
44	Andrei Nazarov	LW	59	3	0	3	−9	135
5	Drake Berehowsky	D	7	1	2	3	0	27
33	Brian Boucher	G	45	0	1	1		0
45	Brad Ference†	D	15	0	1	1	−5	28
77	Chris Gratton†	C	14	0	1	1	−11	21
38	Scott Pellerin†	LW	23	0	1	1	−5	8
34 (Note: Banham wore number 18 in his first three games.)	Frank Banham†	RW	5	0	0	0	−1	2
35	Zac Bierk	G	16	0	0	0		2
1	Sean Burke	G	22	0	0	0		4
40	Patrick DesRochers‡	G	4	0	0	0		0
37	Dan Focht‡	D	10	0	0	0	−2	10
52	Martin Grenier	D	3	0	0	0	−1	0
24	Darcy Hordichuk‡	LW	25	0	0	0	−1	82
21	Jason Jaspers	C	2	0	0	0	−1	0
36	Krys Kolanos	C	2	0	0	0	0	0
40	Jean-Marc Pelletier†	G	2	0	0	0		0

=== Goaltending ===
- † = Joined team via a transaction (e.g., trade, waivers, signing) during the season. Stats reflect time with the Coyotes only.
- ‡ = Left team via a transaction (e.g., trade, waivers, release) during the season. Stats reflect time with the Coyotes only.

No.	Player	Regular season									
No.	Player	GP	W	L	T	SA	GA	GAA	SV%	SO	TOI
33	Brian Boucher	45	15	20	8	1210	128	3.02	.894	0	2544
1	Sean Burke	22	12	6	2	632	44	2.12	.930	2	1248
35	Zac Bierk	16	4	9	1	471	32	2.17	.932	1	884
40	Patrick DesRochers‡	4	0	3	0	88	11	3.77	.875	0	175
40	Jean-Marc Pelletier†	2	0	2	0	48	6	3.03	.875	0	119

== Awards and records ==
=== Awards ===
Type	Award/honor	Recipient	Ref
League (in-season)	NHL Player of the Week	Sean Burke (January 6)	
League (in-season)	NHL YoungStars Game selection	Branko Radivojevic	
League (in-season)	NHL YoungStars Game selection	Ossi Vaananen	
Team	Hardest Working Player Award	Shane Doan	
Team	Leading Scorer Award	Mike Johnson	
Team	Man of the Year Award	Landon Wilson	
Team	Team MVP Award	Mike Johnson	
Team	Three-Star Award	Ladislav Nagy	

=== Milestones ===
Milestone	Player	Date	Ref
First game	Jeff Taffe	October 14, 2002	
First game	Ramzi Abid	November 12, 2002	
1,000th game played	Paul Ranheim	March 6, 2003	

== Transactions ==
The Coyotes were involved in the following transactions from June 14, 2002, the day after the deciding game of the 2002 Stanley Cup Final, through June 9, 2003, the day of the deciding game of the 2003 Stanley Cup Final.

=== Trades ===
Date	Details		Ref
December 19, 2002	To Philadelphia Flyers: Conditional draft pick in 2004	To Phoenix Coyotes: Paul Ranheim	
December 31, 2002	To Carolina Hurricanes: Patrick DesRochers	To Phoenix Coyotes: Jean-Marc Pelletier; Conditional draft pick	
January 16, 2003	To Dallas Stars: Claude Lemieux	To Phoenix Coyotes: Scott Pellerin; Conditional draft pick in 2004 (Note: 4th-round pick.)	
March 8, 2003	To Florida Panthers: Darcy Hordichuk; 2nd-round pick in 2003	To Phoenix Coyotes: Brad Ference	
March 10, 2003	To Philadelphia Flyers: Tony Amonte	To Phoenix Coyotes: Guillaume Lefebvre; Atlanta’s 3rd-round pick in 2003; 2nd-round pick in 2004	
March 11, 2003	To Buffalo Sabres: Daniel Briere; 3rd-round pick in 2004	To Phoenix Coyotes: Chris Gratton; 4th-round pick in 2004	
March 11, 2003	To Pittsburgh Penguins: Ramzi Abid; Dan Focht; Guillaume Lefebvre	To Phoenix Coyotes: Jan Hrdina; Francois Leroux	
March 11, 2003	To Vancouver Canucks: Brad May	To Phoenix Coyotes: Conditional draft pick in 2003 (Note: Either a 2nd or 3rd-round pick.)	
May 31, 2003	To Boston Bruins: 5th-round pick in 2004	To Phoenix Coyotes: Rights to Darren McLachlan	

=== Players acquired ===
Date	Player	Former team	Term	Via	Ref
July 7, 2002	Kelly Buchberger	Los Angeles Kings	1-year	Free agency	
July 12, 2002	Tony Amonte	Chicago Blackhawks	4-year	Free agency	
October 26, 2002	Deron Quint	Springfield Falcons (AHL)	1-year	Free agency	
November 7, 2002	Frank Banham	Jokerit (Liiga)	multi-year	Free agency	
December 13, 2002	Jason Bonsignore	Springfield Falcons (AHL)		Free agency	
April 10, 2003	Mike Stutzel	Northern Michigan University (CCHA)	1-year	Free agency	
June 9, 2003	Kiel McLeod	Kelowna Rockets (WHL)	multi-year	Free agency	

=== Players lost ===
Date	Player	New team	Via (Note: In parentheses is the player's free agency group on July 1 if applicable.)	Ref
July 15, 2002	Wyatt Smith	Nashville Predators	Free agency (VI)	
July 16, 2002	Jean-Guy Trudel	Minnesota Wild	Free agency (VI)	
July 22, 2002	Sebastien Bordeleau	SC Bern (NLA)	Free agency (UFA)	
July 24, 2002	Denis Pederson	Nashville Predators	Free agency (UFA)	
July 29, 2002	Mike Sullivan		Retirement (III)	
September 12, 2002	Alex Andreyev	Greensboro Generals (ECHL)	Free agency (UFA)	

=== Signings ===
Date	Player	Term	Contract type	Ref
June 28, 2002	Fredrik Sjostrom	multi-year	Entry-level	
July 17, 2002	Todd Simpson	2-year	Re-signing	
July 31, 2002	Landon Wilson	1-year	Re-signing	
August 2, 2002	Patrick DesRochers	2-year	Re-signing	
August 6, 2002	Daniel Briere	2-year	Re-signing	
September 6, 2002	Paul Mara	multi-year	Re-signing	
September 11, 2002	Ladislav Nagy	2-year	Re-signing	
September 27, 2002	Sean Burke	multi-year	Extension	
September 30, 2002	Brian Boucher	multi-year	Re-signing	
January 23, 2003	Jean-Marc Pelletier	multi-year	Extension	
April 22, 2003	Ossi Vaananen	multi-year	Extension	
June 1, 2003	Darren McLachlan	multi-year	Entry-level	
June 1, 2003	Matthew Spiller	multi-year	Entry-level	
June 5, 2003	Frantisek Lukes	multi-year	Entry-level	

== Draft picks ==
Phoenix's draft picks at the 2002 NHL entry draft held at the Air Canada Centre in Toronto, Ontario.

Round	#	Player	Nationality	College/Junior/Club team (League)
1	19	Jakub Koreis	Czech Republic	HC Plzen (Czech Republic)
1	23	Ben Eager	Canada	Oshawa Generals (OHL)
2	46	David LeNeveu	Canada	Cornell University (ECAC)
3	70	Joe Callahan	United States	Yale University (ECAC)
3	80	Matt Jones	United States	University of North Dakota (WCHA)
4	97	Lance Monych	Canada	Brandon Wheat Kings (WHL)
5	132	John Zeiler	United States	Sioux City Musketeers (USHL)
6	186	Jeff Pietrasiak	United States	Berkshire High School (USHS-MA)
7	216	Ladislav Kouba	Czech Republic	Red Deer Rebels (WHL)
8	249	Marcus Smith	United States	Kitchener Rangers (OHL)
9	280	Russell Spence	Canada	OCN Blizzard (MJHL)

== See also ==
- 2002–03 NHL season
