= Sean Burke =

Canadian ice hockey player (born 1967)

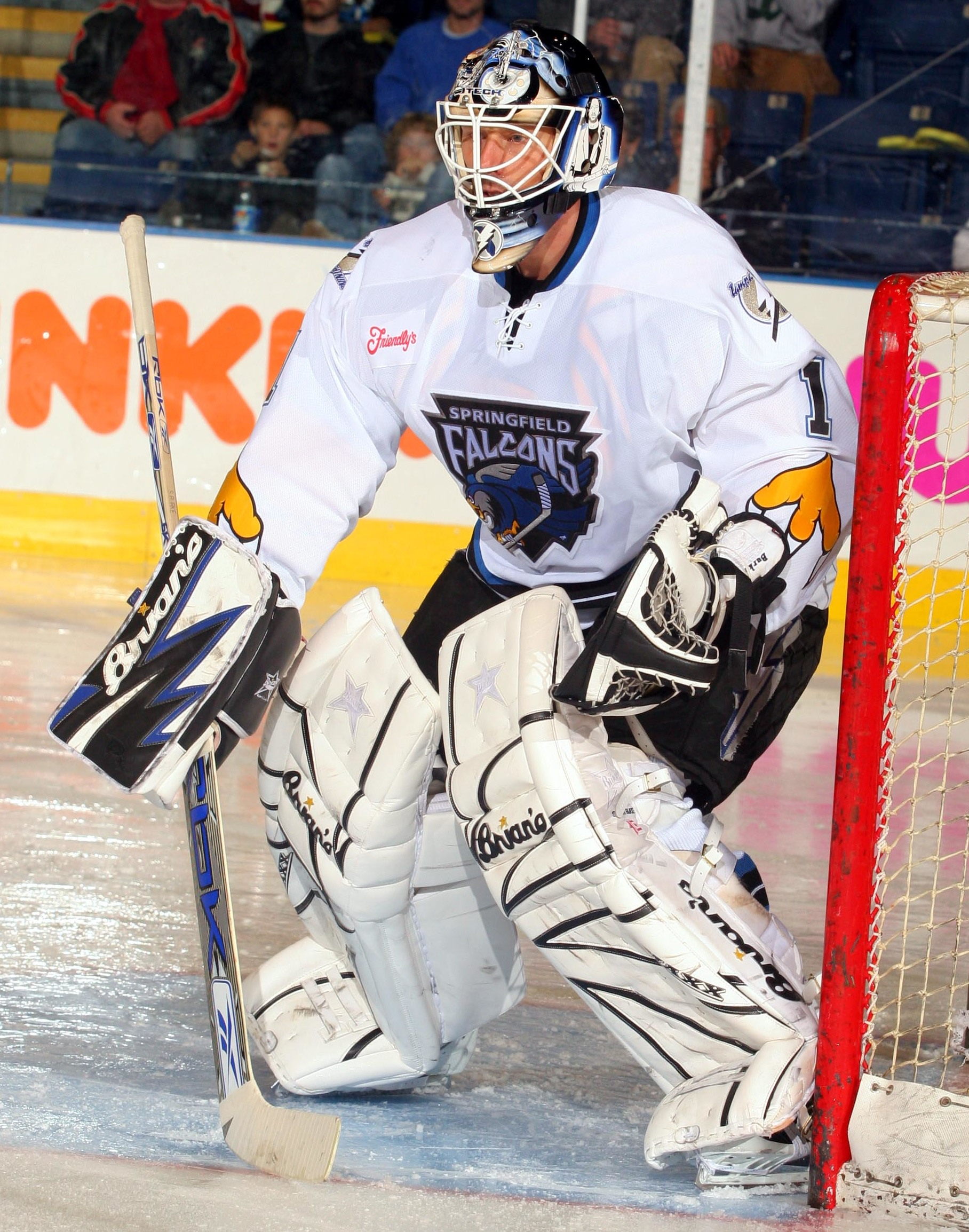
- Burke with the Springfield Falcons in 2006
- Born: January 29, 1967 (age 59) Windsor, Ontario, Canada
- Height: 6 ft 4 in (193 cm)
- Weight: 215 lb (98 kg; 15 st 5 lb)
- Position: Goaltender
- Caught: Left
- Played for: New Jersey Devils; Hartford Whalers; Carolina Hurricanes; Vancouver Canucks; Philadelphia Flyers; Florida Panthers; Phoenix Coyotes; Tampa Bay Lightning; Los Angeles Kings
- National team: Canada
- NHL draft: 24th overall, 1985; New Jersey Devils
- Playing career: 1988–2007

Sean Burke (born January 29, 1967) is a Canadian former professional ice hockey goaltender and the current director of goaltending for the Vegas Golden Knights, with whom he won the Stanley Cup in 2023. He played 18 seasons in the National Hockey League (NHL) for the New Jersey Devils, Hartford Whalers, Carolina Hurricanes, Vancouver Canucks, Philadelphia Flyers, Florida Panthers, Phoenix Coyotes, Tampa Bay Lightning and Los Angeles Kings between 1988 and 2007. He was born in Windsor, Ontario, but grew up in Toronto, Ontario. Burke was rated number 69 on The Hockey News list of the Top 100 Goalies of All-Time in 2018.

== Playing career ==
Burke with the New Jersey Devils

As a youth, Burke played in the 1980 Quebec International Pee-Wee Hockey Tournament with the St. Michael's minor ice hockey team from Toronto.

Burke attended St. Michael's college high school and played junior B hockey for the St.Michael's Buzzers in the 1983-84 season. He was taken in the 3rd round of the OHL draft by the Toronto Marlboros where he would play for the next two seasons.

Burke was drafted by the New Jersey Devils in the second round of the 1985 NHL entry draft. He earned national attention from his international play, backstopping the Canada men's national junior ice hockey team to a silver medal in the 1986 World Junior Ice Hockey Championships and a fourth-place finish for the men's national team at the 1988 Winter Olympics in Calgary.

Burke transitioned directly from Canada's Olympics national team to the Devils. He started 11 games for the Devils in the 1987–88 season, including an overtime victory against the Chicago Blackhawks on the final night of the season that qualified the Devils for their first Stanley Cup playoff series.

Dubbed a "rookie sensation", Burke helped the Devils go on a strong playoff run, defeating the division-leader New York Islanders in the first round in six games and then the Washington Capitals in seven games. The Devils were one game away from the Stanley Cup Final but lost in game 7 of the Wales Conference Finals to the Boston Bruins. Burke's play was widely heralded, with The Hockey Digest stating, "Burke is now the franchise for the Devils, and to whatever heights he rises, the Devils will rise with him," and in December 1988, Burke became the first Devil to appear on its cover.

Because he played just 11 games in the 1987–88 regular season, Burke maintained his rookie status for the 1988–89 season. That season, he was named to the 1989 All-Star Game.

Burke played for the Devils through the 1990–91 season, then sat out the 1991–92 season requesting a trade. Instead, he joined coach Dave King and played for the Canadian national team in the Winter Olympics for a second time, backstopping Canada to a silver medal. Teammates on the 1992 Olympic team included future NHL players Eric Lindros and Joe Juneau.

On August 28, 1992, Burke was traded to the Hartford Whalers in exchange for Bobby Holík, a second-round pick in the 1993 NHL entry draft (used to select Jay Pandolfo) and future considerations. He played there (and with the relocated Whalers team, the Carolina Hurricanes) for six seasons. He was voted Whalers' team MVP from 1993 to 1997. Burke then played with several teams, including the Philadelphia Flyers, Vancouver Canucks and Florida Panthers. He subsequently signed with the Phoenix Coyotes and played there for five seasons, where he was a finalist for the Vezina Trophy and third finalist for the Hart Memorial Trophy in the 2001–02 season.

Burke was selected to represent the Arizona Coyotes in the 2000-01 and 2001-02 NHL All Star games.

After that, Burke played for the Philadelphia Flyers (for the second time) recording his 300th career NHL win (the 20th goaltender to reach this milestone), and the Tampa Bay Lightning. Burke was placed on waivers by Tampa Bay before the 2006–07 season but was not picked up. He then played for Tampa Bay's American Hockey League (AHL) affiliate, the Springfield Falcons. Burke was placed on waivers by the Lightning and picked up off re-entry waivers by the Los Angeles Kings.

Burke announced his retirement from professional hockey on September 18, 2007. Burke currently sits #15 on the list of all time games played for NHL goaltenders (820) #30 all time wins (324) #50 all time shutouts (38) and #5 all time penalty minutes for goaltenders (310)

== International play ==
Medal record

Men's ice hockey

Representing Canada

Canada Cup
| Gold medal – first place | 1991 Canada | |

Olympic Games
| Silver medal – second place | 1992 Albertville | |

World Championship
| Gold medal – first place | 1997 Finland | |
| Gold medal – first place | 2003 Finland | |

World Junior Championship
| Silver medal – second place | 1986 Canada | |

Burke played in 11 games for the Canadian national team in the 1988 and 1992 Winter Olympics. He served as the back-up goaltender in the 1991 Canada Cup and has also played in 130 games for other Canadian national teams from 1985 through 2003.

The 130 games that Burke has played for Team Canada represent the most games any goaltender has played Internationally for Canada

In 2020, Burke was named into the IIHF All-Time Canada Team along with Scott Niedermayer, Chris Pronger, Wayne Gretzky, Mario Lemieux and Sidney Crosby.

== Post-NHL career ==
On March 4, 2008, the Phoenix Coyotes hired Burke to become its director of prospect development. He was also the assistant to the general manager and Coyotes' goaltending coach.

In 2015 Burke was part of the management group along with General Manager Jim Nill, George McPhee and Pat Verbeek that led Canada to a gold medal at the IIHF World Championships. Canada went undefeated in the tournament held in Prague, Czech Republic beating Russia 6 to 1 in the gold medal game.

In 2016 Burke joined General Managers Brad Treliving and George McPhee as part of the management group for the IIHF World Championships in Moscow and Saint Petersburg, Russia. Canada won the gold medal defeating Finland 2 to 0 in the final game.

In 2017 Burke co managed Team Canada at the IIHF World Championships along with Ron Hextall in Cologne, Germany and Paris, France. Canada took home the silver medal after being defeated 2 to 1 in a shootout by Sweden.

Burke was the General Manager for Team Canada at the Spengler Cup in 2016, 2017 and 2019 taking home gold medals. In 2018 he managed the team along with Ron Francis taking home the silver medal.

In September 2016, Burke joined the Montreal Canadiens as a professional scout. He also spent the 2020–21 season as the full time goaltending coach with the Canadiens as the team made it to the Stanley Cup Final losing to the Tampa Bay Lightning in five games. On July 25, 2017, he was announced as the general manager of Canada's men's team for the 2018 Winter Olympics in Pyeongchang. where Team Canada went on to win the bronze medal. That same season he co managed the IIHF World Championships with Martin Brodeur and Scott Salmond held in Copenhagen and Herning, Denmark.

In March 2021, Burke was appointed as the director of goaltending for the Montreal Canadiens.

On June 25, 2022, Burke was appointed as director of goaltending for the Vegas Golden Knights. Even with the Golden Knights losing their previous season's starting goaltender Robin Lehner for the entire season due to injury and off-season surgery, and rotating through a total of five other goaltenders due to various injuries (by numbers of regular season games started, Logan Thompson, Adin Hill, Laurent Brossoit, Jonathan Quick, and Jiří Patera), Burke was able to help coach the Golden Knights to the Stanley Cup in 2023 (Burke's first Stanley Cup win).

Burke is a member of the International Ice Hockey Federations Players Committee where he has served on the committee since 2016.

== Personal life ==
Burke and his wife Christy have one son together. Burke has two children from a previous marriage.

On November 2, 1997, Burke and his then-wife were both charged with assault following an alleged altercation at their home. Despite the incident, the Carolina Hurricanes chose not to suspend Burke. In January 1998, Burke was fined $200, sentenced to 18 months probation, and required to complete an educational program on domestic violence after pleading guilty to the assault charge.

== Career statistics ==
=== Regular season and playoffs ===
Bold indicates led league

| | | | Regular season | | | | | | | | | | Playoffs |
| Season | Team | League | GP | W | L | T | OTL | MIN | GA | SO | GAA | SV% | GP | W | L | MIN | GA | SO | GAA | SV% |
|---|---|---|---|---|---|---|---|---|---|---|---|---|---|---|---|---|---|---|---|---|
| 1983–84 | St. Michael's Buzzers | MetJHL | 25 | — | — | — | — | 1482 | 120 | 0 | 4.86 | — | — | — | — | — | — | — | — | — |
| 1984–85 | Toronto Marlboros | OHL | 49 | 25 | 21 | 3 | — | 2987 | 211 | 0 | 4.24 | — | 5 | 1 | 3 | 266 | 25 | 0 | 5.64 | — |
| 1985–86 | Toronto Marlboros | OHL | 47 | 16 | 27 | 3 | — | 2840 | 233 | 0 | 4.92 | .862 | 4 | 0 | 4 | 238 | 24 | 0 | 6.05 | — |
| 1986–87 | Canada | Intl. | 42 | 27 | 13 | 2 | — | 2550 | 130 | 0 | 3.05 | — | — | — | — | — | — | — | — | — |
| 1987–88 | Canada | Intl. | 37 | 19 | 9 | 2 | — | 1962 | 92 | 1 | 2.81 | — | — | — | — | — | — | — | — | — |
| 1987–88 | New Jersey Devils | NHL | 13 | 10 | 1 | 0 | — | 688 | 35 | 1 | 3.05 | .883 | 17 | 9 | 8 | 999 | 57 | 1 | 3.42 | .889 |
| 1988–89 | New Jersey Devils | NHL | 62 | 22 | **31** | 9 | — | 3590 | **230** | 3 | 3.84 | .873 | — | — | — | — | — | — | — | — |
| 1989–90 | New Jersey Devils | NHL | 52 | 22 | 22 | 6 | — | 2914 | 175 | 0 | 3.60 | .880 | 2 | 0 | 2 | 125 | 8 | 0 | 3.84 | .860 |
| 1990–91 | New Jersey Devils | NHL | 35 | 8 | 12 | 8 | — | 1870 | 112 | 0 | 3.59 | .872 | — | — | — | — | — | — | — | — |
| 1991–92 | Canada | Intl. | 31 | 18 | 6 | 4 | — | 1721 | 75 | 1 | 2.61 | — | — | — | — | — | — | — | — | — |
| 1991–92 | San Diego Gulls | IHL | 7 | 4 | 2 | 1 | — | 424 | 17 | 0 | 2.41 | — | 3 | 0 | 3 | 160 | 13 | 0 | 4.88 | — |
| 1992–93 | Hartford Whalers | NHL | 50 | 16 | 27 | 3 | — | 2656 | 184 | 0 | 4.16 | .876 | — | — | — | — | — | — | — | — |
| 1993–94 | Hartford Whalers | NHL | 47 | 17 | 24 | 5 | — | 2750 | 137 | 2 | 2.99 | .906 | — | — | — | — | — | — | — | — |
| 1994–95 | Hartford Whalers | NHL | 42 | 17 | 19 | 4 | — | 2418 | 108 | 0 | 2.68 | .912 | — | — | — | — | — | — | — | — |
| 1995–96 | Hartford Whalers | NHL | 66 | 28 | 28 | 6 | — | 3669 | 190 | 4 | 3.11 | .907 | — | — | — | — | — | — | — | — |
| 1996–97 | Hartford Whalers | NHL | 51 | 22 | 22 | 6 | — | 2985 | 134 | 4 | 2.69 | .914 | — | — | — | — | — | — | — | — |
| 1997–98 | Carolina Hurricanes | NHL | 25 | 7 | 11 | 5 | — | 1415 | 66 | 1 | 2.80 | .899 | — | — | — | — | — | — | — | — |
| 1997–98 | Vancouver Canucks | NHL | 16 | 2 | 9 | 4 | — | 838 | 49 | 0 | 3.51 | .876 | — | — | — | — | — | — | — | — |
| 1997–98 | Philadelphia Flyers | NHL | 11 | 7 | 3 | 0 | — | 632 | 27 | 1 | 2.56 | .913 | 5 | 1 | 4 | 283 | 17 | 0 | 3.60 | .860 |
| 1998–99 | Florida Panthers | NHL | 59 | 21 | 24 | 14 | — | 3402 | 151 | 3 | 2.66 | .907 | — | — | — | — | — | — | — | — |
| 1999–2000 | Florida Panthers | NHL | 7 | 2 | 5 | 0 | — | 418 | 18 | 0 | 2.58 | .913 | — | — | — | — | — | — | — | — |
| 1999–2000 | Phoenix Coyotes | NHL | 35 | 17 | 14 | 3 | — | 2074 | 88 | 3 | 2.55 | .914 | 5 | 1 | 4 | 296 | 16 | 0 | 3.24 | .904 |
| 2000–01 | Phoenix Coyotes | NHL | 62 | 25 | 22 | **13** | — | 3644 | 138 | 4 | 2.27 | .922 | — | — | — | — | — | — | — | — |
| 2001–02 | Phoenix Coyotes | NHL | 60 | 33 | 21 | 6 | — | 3587 | 137 | 5 | 2.29 | .920 | 5 | 1 | 4 | 297 | 13 | 0 | 2.63 | .902 |
| 2002–03 | Phoenix Coyotes | NHL | 22 | 12 | 6 | 2 | — | 1248 | 44 | 2 | 2.11 | .930 | — | — | — | — | — | — | — | — |
| 2003–04 | Phoenix Coyotes | NHL | 32 | 10 | 15 | 5 | — | 1795 | 84 | 1 | 2.81 | .908 | — | — | — | — | — | — | — | — |
| 2003–04 | Philadelphia Flyers | NHL | 15 | 6 | 5 | 2 | — | 825 | 35 | 1 | 2.55 | .910 | 1 | 0 | 0 | 40 | 1 | 0 | 1.50 | .889 |
| 2005–06 | Tampa Bay Lightning | NHL | 35 | 14 | 10 | — | 4 | 1713 | 80 | 2 | 2.80 | .895 | 3 | 0 | 1 | 109 | 7 | 0 | 3.85 | .877 |
| 2006–07 | Springfield Falcons | AHL | 7 | 2 | 5 | — | 0 | 345 | 26 | 0 | 4.52 | .856 | — | — | — | — | — | — | — | — |
| 2006–07 | Los Angeles Kings | NHL | 23 | 6 | 10 | — | 5 | 1310 | 68 | 1 | 3.11 | .901 | — | — | — | — | — | — | — | — |
| NHL totals | | | 820 | 324 | 341 | 101 | 9 | 46,440 | 2,290 | 38 | 2.96 | .902 | 38 | 12 | 23 | 2,149 | 119 | 1 | 3.32 | .888 |

=== International ===
| Year | Team | Event | GP | W | L | T | MIN | GA | SO | GAA | SV% |
|---|---|---|---|---|---|---|---|---|---|---|---|
| 1986 | Canada | WJC | 2 | 1 | 1 | 0 | 120 | 7 | 0 | 3.50 | — |
| 1987 | Canada | WC | 5 | 2 | 2 | 1 | 300 | 12 | 0 | 2.40 | — |
| 1988 | Canada | OLY | 4 | 1 | 2 | 1 | 238 | 12 | 0 | 3.02 | — |
| 1989 | Canada | WC | 5 | — | — | — | 275 | 10 | 1 | 2.18 | — |
| 1991 | Canada | WC | 8 | 5 | 1 | 2 | 479 | 21 | 0 | 2.63 | — |
| 1992 | Canada | OLY | 7 | 5 | 2 | 0 | 429 | 17 | 0 | 2.37 | — |
| 1997 | Canada | WC | 11 | 7 | 1 | 3 | 608 | 22 | 3 | 2.17 | .924 |
| 2003 | Canada | WC | 6 | — | — | — | 329 | 7 | 1 | 1.28 | .955 |
| Junior totals | | | 2 | 1 | 1 | 0 | 120 | 7 | 0 | 3.50 | — |
| Senior totals | | | 46 | — | — | — | 2658 | 101 | 5 | 2.28 | — |

== Awards and honours ==
| Award | Year |
NHL
| All-Star Game | 1989, 2001, 2002 |
| Stanley Cup champion | 2023 (as coach) |
International
| WC All-Star Team | 1991, 2003 |
| Best Goaltender | 2003 |
| IIHF All-Canada Team | 2020 |
