= Keith Tkachuk =

American ice hockey player (born 1972)

- Hockey Hall of Fame, 2026
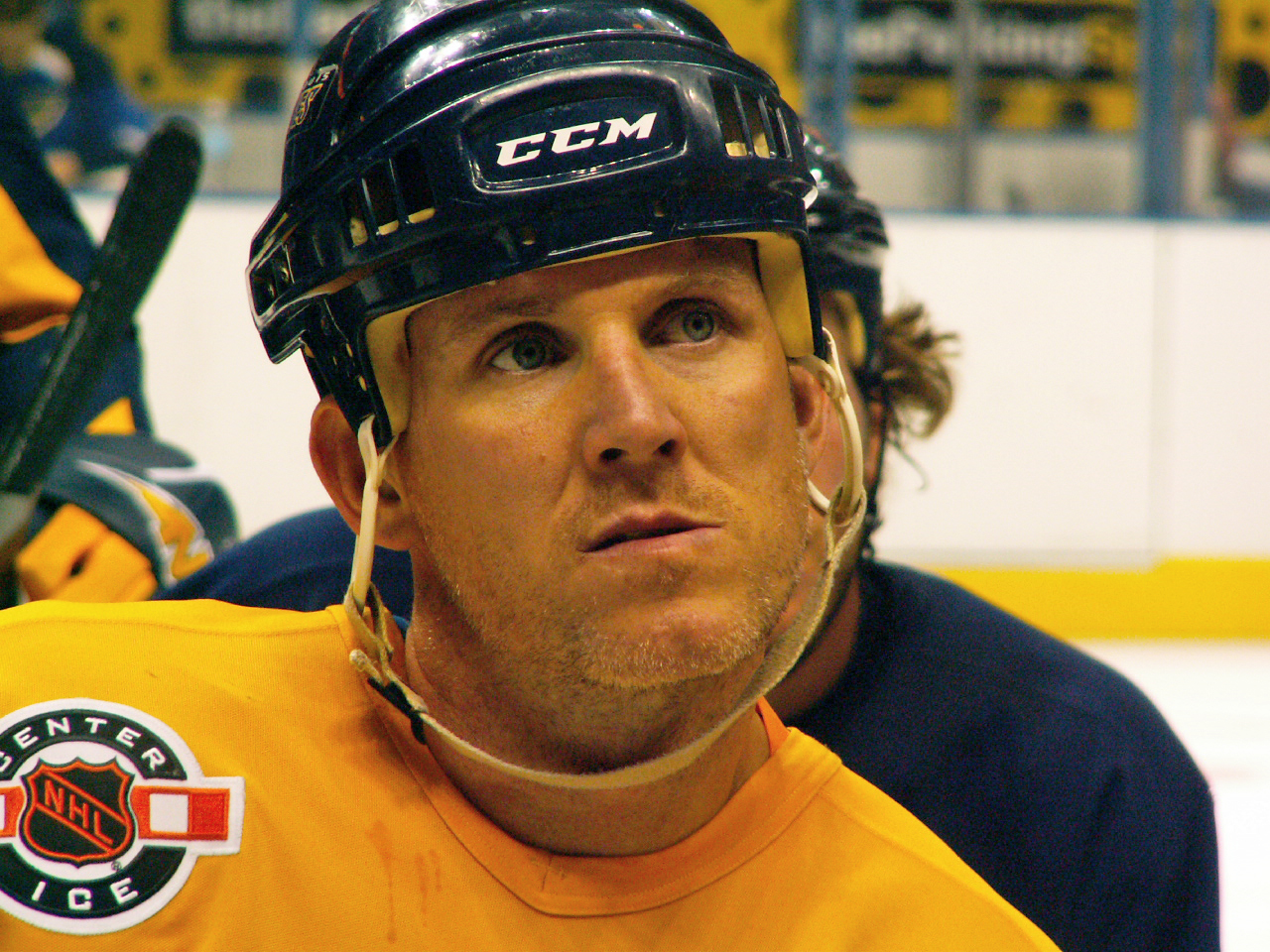
- Tkachuk with the St. Louis Blues in 2008
- Born: March 28, 1972 (age 54) Melrose, Massachusetts, U.S.
- Height: 6 ft 2 in (188 cm)
- Weight: 235 lb (107 kg; 16 st 11 lb)
- Position: Left wing
- Shot: Left
- Played for: Winnipeg Jets; Phoenix Coyotes; St. Louis Blues; Atlanta Thrashers
- National team: United States
- NHL draft: 19th overall, 1990; Winnipeg Jets
- Playing career: 1992–2010
Medal record
Representing United States
Ice hockey
Olympic Games
Silver medal – second place	2002 Salt Lake City
World Cup
Gold medal – first place	1996 North America
World Junior Championships
Bronze medal – third place	1992 Kaufbeuren

Keith Matthew Tkachuk (/kəˈtʃʌk/; born March 28, 1972) is an American former professional ice hockey player who was a left winger for 18 seasons in the National Hockey League (NHL) for the Winnipeg Jets, Phoenix Coyotes, St. Louis Blues and Atlanta Thrashers.

Drafted as the 19th overall pick by Winnipeg in 1990, he made the team at the tail end of the 1991–92 season, recording eight points in 17 games. The following year, in his first full season with the team, he recorded the first of twelve consecutive 20-goal seasons and quickly became one of the elite power forwards of his era. He recorded consecutive 50-goal seasons, doing so with Winnipeg in the 1995–96 season and Phoenix in the 1996–97 season, with the latter seeing him lead the NHL in goals scored, becoming the first American to lead the NHL in goal-scoring. He was traded from the Coyotes to the Blues late in the 2000–01 season, where he would play as a mainstay for nine of the next ten years.

In 2008, he scored his 500th goal to become the 41st player with 500 goals in NHL history and fourth American to do so and subsequently recorded his 1,000th point to become the sixth American to reach the milestone. He retired in 2010; from 1991 to 2010, Tkachuk was one of eight players to score 500 goals. A tough forward who recorded over 100 penalty minutes in ten of his eighteen seasons, Tkachuk is one of three players to have recorded both 500 goals and 2,000 penalty minutes in NHL history. Considered one of the best American-born players to play in the league, he represented the United States for various international competitions, which saw them win the World Cup of Hockey in 1996 and a silver medal in the 2002 Winter Olympics. In 2011, he was inducted into the United States Hockey Hall of Fame; he was subsequently honored with induction into the Coyotes Ring of Honor and the Blues Hall of Fame.

Tkachuk has been inducted into the Hockey Hall of Fame in 2026.

He is the father of Matthew and Brady Tkachuk, who both play for the Florida Panthers.

== Early life ==
Tkachuk is of Ukrainian and Irish heritage. He was born at the Melrose/Wakefield Hospital in Melrose, Massachusetts as the son of Gerry and John Tkachuk, a Boston firefighter who settled the family down in Medford, Massachusetts. He played high school hockey at Malden Catholic High School in Malden, Massachusetts. Modelling his game after his idol Cam Neely of the Boston Bruins, Tkachuk earned a scholarship for collegiate hockey at Boston University, where he notched 40 points (17 goals, 23 assists) while being named to the Hockey East All-Rookie Team in his one season with the team. The Terriers made it all the way to the 1991 NCAA Division I men's ice hockey tournament championship game, losing to Northern Michigan 8–7 in triple overtime.

He was a member of the United States national junior team in 1991 and 1992. Due to not having played in the NHL at the time of the 1992 Olympic competition for hockey, Tkachuk was eligible to play for Team USA, which he ended up making the team despite considering himself a longshot in tryouts. He was drafted in the first round as the 19th overall pick in the 1990 NHL entry draft by the Winnipeg Jets, who had acquired the pick from the Buffalo Sabres in the deal that sent Dale Hawerchuk to Buffalo. Tkachuk played as a center, left winger and right winger in his career.

Tkachuk has earned the nickname "Walt" (given to him by Eddie Olczyk), possibly in reference to Walter Tkaczuk, a star center who played for the New York Rangers from 1967 to 1981. The two players' last names are pronounced similarly but spelled differently (being the Polish and English transliterations, respectively, of the Ukrainian "Ткачук"), and the two men are not related to each other. With his strong play in front of the net, using his size and strength to battle opposing defensemen, St. Louis Blues broadcasters and fans dubbed Tkachuk "Big Walt."

== Playing career ==
=== Winnipeg Jets / Phoenix Coyotes (1992–2001) ===
Days after the end of the 1992 Winter Olympics, Tkachuk made his NHL debut on February 28, 1992, against the Vancouver Canucks, where he tallied an assist. As early as his second game in the NHL, Tkachuk had a willingness to fight, doing so against Scott Mellanby of the Edmonton Oilers on the faceoff in the neutral zone. He would finish the season playing with the Jets, scoring eight points in 17 games. In the Stanley Cup playoffs that year, he scored three goals in seven games. The following 1992–93 season was Tkachuk's official rookie year. He appeared in 83 games and ended the season with 28 goals and 51 points, which included a 12–game point streak from March 9 to April 3. Tkachuk became the team captain the next season on November 3, 1993, two weeks after recording his first hat-trick, against the Philadelphia Flyers. Some of his accomplishments from that season include leading the Jets in goals (41), points (81) and power-play goals (22). The 1994–95 season, which was shortened by a labor lockout, saw Tkachuk earn all-star second-team honors, as well as being second on the Jets in points scored.

By the end of the 1994–95 season, it was clear that the Jets were in a dire financial situation. While this eventually resulted in the franchise being sold to Minnesota-based interests, serious efforts to keep the team in Winnipeg were still ongoing during the 1995 off-season. Tkachuk, a restricted free agent at the time, requested a trade and made it clear he would not re-sign with Winnipeg under any circumstances. While the Jets attempted to negotiate a deal with several teams, a trade could not be finalized. While the then-new collective bargaining agreement allowed restricted free agents to negotiate directly with other teams, Tkachuk was initially reluctant to sign an offer sheet since Winnipeg would have the right to match it. Eventually however, frustrated by the lack of progress in negotiations, the Chicago Blackhawks persuaded Tkachuk to sign a front-loaded five-year offer sheet worth $17 million, with $6 million due in the first season. However, to the disappointment of both the Blackhawks and Tkachuk, any assumption that the organization's poor financial situation would preclude them from meeting such obligations quickly proved incorrect as the Jets matched the offer sheet within six hours.

Due to the contract dispute, Tkachuk was stripped of the captaincy and replaced by Kris King; nonetheless, he set a career-high 50 goals and 98 points, the closest he ever came to reaching the 100-point plateau. Tkachuk also led the Jets in power play goals (20), game-winning goals (6), shots (249) and plus-minus rating (+11). Going up against the Presidents' Trophy-winning Detroit Red Wings, the Jets lost in six games, with Tkachuk scoring a goal and two assists in the series. After losing Game 6 by a score of 4–1, the final Jets game in the city of Winnipeg before relocating to Phoenix, Tkachuk led the Jets in a final skate around Winnipeg Arena in appreciation of the fans.

After negotiations to move to Minnesota collapsed, the Jets relocated to Phoenix, Arizona, in 1996. Tkachuk moved with the team, remaining a member of the newly named Phoenix Coyotes. He was also re-appointed captain, replacing Kris King. Paired with center Craig Janney and winger Dallas Drake on the same line for the 1996–97 season, Tkachuk logged a career-high 52 goals to go along with 34 assists for a total of 86 points and reached the NHL All-Star Game for the first time in his career (his goals and points ended up enduring as the record in the Coyotes era). With a league-leading 52 goals and 228 penalty minutes, he was the first player in league history to lead the league in scoring and have over 200 penalty minutes. He went on to record 40 goals with 26 assists for 66 points in 69 games in the 1997–98 season and made the All-Star Game once again. In that same year, Tkachuk appeared on the front cover of the video game NHL Breakaway '98.

Prior to the 1998–99 season, Tkachuk held out of training camp due to a contract holdout that saw him temporarily suspended before the team increased his salary that would see him paid over $16 million combined over the next three seasons. He played in 68 games and recorded 36 goals with 32 assists for 68 points with another All-Star Game selection. In February of 1998, in the first occasion of NHL players being invited to play in the Winter Olympics, Tkachuk was selected to the American team. The team ended up winning just one game against international competition, and Tkachuk was subsequently accused of being one of the key figures in the trashing of a hotel room.

Tkachuk was plagued by injuries in the 1999–2000 season (most notably a sprained ankle) that saw him play 50 games and record 22 goals with 21 assists. In late December 1999, a deal was nearly struck that would've sent Tkachuk to the Carolina Hurricanes in exchange for Keith Primeau, Dave Karpa and a few draft picks, but Tkachuk's rising salary in the upcoming 2000 season led to the deal being nixed. After struggling with injuries for the next two seasons, the Coyotes found themselves at a crossroad with Tkachuk, who was now making $8.3 million for the 2000–01 season for a team that was looking to slash payroll. On October 27 of that season, he scored his 300th career goal on an empty net in a home game versus Dallas. On March 13, 2001, Tkachuk was traded to the St. Louis Blues in exchange for Ladislav Nagy, Michal Handzuš, Jeff Taffe and a first-round draft pick (Ben Eager), where he was reunited with former teammate Dallas Drake, who had signed a free agent deal with the Blues in the summer of 2000. Tkachuk would leave the Coyotes ranking second in all-time goals (323) and first in penalty minutes (1,508), among other records.

=== St. Louis Blues (2001–2007) ===
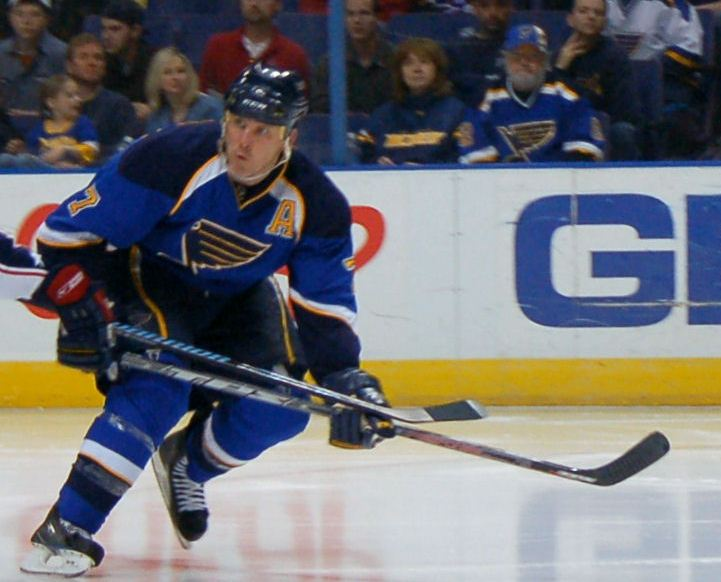
Tkachuk during a game with the Blues in 2008.

Tkachuk made an immediate impact on the Blues, scoring six goals and eight points in the final 12 games of the 2000–01 season. In the Stanley Cup playoff run, he had two goals and seven assists with 20 penalty minutes as the Blues made it all the way to the Western Conference Final before losing to the Colorado Avalanche, the eventual 2001 Stanley Cup champions. For the 2001–02 season, he played in 73 games and recorded another 30-goal season with 38 to go along with 37 assists and 117 penalty minutes. He was selected to the American roster for the 2002 Winter Olympics hockey team, which made it all the way to the gold medal game against Canada. The Canadian team beat them 5–2, but the American team was awarded the silver medal for their first medal in men's hockey since 1980.

In July 2002, he accepted a $8.3 million qualifying offer for the 2002–03 season and on September 12, 2002, he agreed to a four-year contract for $40 million with a club option for a fifth year. He had 31 goals in just 56 games that season. In February 2003, he received a four-game suspension without pay for hitting Minnesota forward Wes Walz in the head with his stick. The following month saw him suffer what was reported to be a sprained right wrist that had miss nearly a month of the season; Tkachuk later stated that he actually had a partial tear in his wrist, which he tried to play through for the subsequent playoff action against Vancouver that saw him score one goal in the seven-game series loss.

In the 2003–04 season, he had 33 goals and 38 assists in 75 games while being named to the NHL All-Star Game. In the 2004 World Cup of Hockey, held just before the 2004–05 NHL lockout, Tkachuk had five goals (four coming against Russia in the quarterfinal game) but America lost in the semifinals to go without a top-three finish. When the league was preparing to return in the 2005–06 season, Tkachuk reported to training camp 25 pounds overweight and failed his physical, which saw him briefly suspended by the team. He played in just 41 games and had 15 goals with 21 assists.

In the training camp for the 2006–07 season, he reported to camp around 30 pounds lighter than he was in the previous year's training camp. He responded by having 27 goals with 31 assists in 79 games, which wound up being spent with two teams.

=== Atlanta Thrashers (2007) ===
Tkachuk was set to become an unrestricted free agent in the summer of 2007, and the Blues, who picked up his $3.8 million option, sought to trade him with the team in a rebuilding year. With interest from the Anaheim Ducks, Detroit Red Wings, and the Atlanta Thrashers, the Blues traded him to Atlanta on February 25, 2007, doing so in exchange for Glen Metropolit, a first-round pick in 2007, a third-round pick in 2007 and a second-round pick in 2008. At the time of the trade, he had 20 goals on the season (it was noted that if Atlanta managed to re-sign Tkachuk, the Blues would get a first-round draft pick).

With Atlanta, he had seven goals with eight assists in 18 games as the Thrashers made it into the 2007 Stanley Cup playoffs. He had assists in the first two games and a goal in Game 4 but Atlanta was swept by the New York Rangers.

=== Return to St. Louis (2007–2010) ===
On June 26 of the same year, St. Louis reacquired Tkachuk, along with a conditional fourth-round draft pick, in exchange for a conditional first-round pick in 2008, doing so days before the July 1 deadline where he would be an unrestricted free agent. Since the Blues acquired exclusive negotiating rights with Tkachuk and re-signed him to a two-year deal, Atlanta received a conditional fourth-round pick in 2008. Tkachuk signed a new, two-year contract with the Blues for $8 million on June 30. Upon re-signing, Tkachuk said of the Blues, "I see a lot of good things happening... They're going to be very active in making this a better hockey team." Tkachuk was paired with newly-signed left winger Paul Kariya and Brad Boyes on the same line to start the season.

The 2007–08 season saw Tkachuk reach a few milestones in playing his 1,000th career game and reach 500 career goals. On the final day of the regular season on April 6, 2008, he scored his 500th NHL goal, doing so on the road against the Columbus Blue Jackets. He became the 41st player to reach the milestone and only the fourth American to reach 500 goals in NHL history.

On November 30, 2008, Tkachuk scored his 511th goal, which combined with his 489 assists gave him 1,000 NHL points for his career. He became the sixth American, and 72nd overall, to achieve that milestone; it came in his 1,077th NHL game. Prior to the March 2009 trade deadline, Tkachuk was narrowly traded to the Boston Bruins, which reportedly would've seen Phil Kessel go to the Blues, but the trade was scuttled. Tkachuk signed a one-year contract extension with the Blues on June 19, 2009. On April 7, 2010, Tkachuk announced that he would be retiring from hockey at the conclusion of the 2009–10 season. In his final game two days later against the Anaheim Ducks in St. Louis, Tkachuk provided two assists in the third period as the Blues rallied to win 6–3.

== Style of play and legacy ==
Being one of the elite power forwards of his era, Tkachuk was known for his aggressive, physical style while consistently scoring points. Tkachuk had more than 100 penalty minutes in eleven of his eighteen NHL seasons, including three seasons with over 200 penalty minutes. Involving his style of play, Tkachuk was once quoted early in his career as stating:

I’m the kind of player who needs to hit somebody early to play well. I know that I need a couple of early hits to have a good game.

Tkachuk was known for his goal-scoring prowess, scoring 30 goals eight times, including two 40-goal seasons and two back-to-back 50 goal seasons, the latter of which he led the NHL in goals, with 52. In 2011, he was inducted into the United States Hockey Hall of Fame and the Phoenix Coyotes Ring of Honor. Despite his accomplishments, he was not inducted into the Hockey Hall of Fame for several years after he was eligible for induction; when asked about it in 2025, he stated the following:

I mean, there's nothing I can do. I appreciate the support. I really do. If it happens, great. If it doesn't, life goes on. But my kids are my Hall of Fame. I enjoy watching them. I work for the Blues, but I also get to see my kids play and see them grow up. It was an honor to play in the NHL. The game has changed my life. If it happens, I know my mother will be extremely happy. I think she's one who takes it the hardest.

In 2024, he was inducted into the Blues Hall of Fame. In November 9, 2026, he was announced for induction in Toronto into the Hockey Hall of Fame.

== Personal life ==
Tkachuk has been married to Chantal Oster, a native of Winnipeg, Manitoba, since February 28, 1997. Their two sons, Matthew and Brady, play in the NHL and won the gold medal in the 2026 Winter Olympics, and their daughter, Taryn, was an NCAA Division I field hockey player for the University of Virginia.

Tkachuk is of Ukrainian and Irish ancestry. He is a cousin of former NHL player and former general manager of the New Jersey Devils, Tom Fitzgerald, as well as a cousin of NHL player Kevin Hayes and retired player Jimmy Hayes. Tkachuk's brother-in-law is NHL player agent Craig Oster, who represents numerous NHL players, including Erik Karlsson, Mark Stone and Evgeny Kuznetsov.

== Select milestones ==
- 1,000 games played — December 1, 2007, against the Chicago Blackhawks
- 700 career points — April 5, 2002, against the Chicago Blackhawks
- 400 career goals — October 12, 2003, against the Colorado Avalanche
- 500 career goals — April 6, 2008, against the Columbus Blue Jackets
- 1,000 career points — November 30, 2008, against the Atlanta Thrashers

== Records ==
Tkachuk led the NHL in goals during the 1996–97 season with 52, the first American-born player to do so. Recording 228 penalty minutes, he became the fourth (and currently last) player in NHL history to record 50 goals and 200 penalty minutes in a single season. In his career from 1991 to 2010, he was one of 15 players to record 1,000 points during that timespan.

Other records:

- Arizona Coyotes franchise record for career penalty minutes (1,508)

== Career statistics ==
=== Regular season and playoffs ===
			Regular season					Playoffs
Season	Team	League	GP	G	A	Pts	PIM	GP	G	A	Pts	PIM
1988–89	Malden Catholic High School	HS-MA	21	30	16	46	—	—	—	—	—	—
1989–90	Malden Catholic High School	HS-MA	6	12	14	26	—	—	—	—	—	—
1990–91	Boston University	HE	36	17	23	40	70	—	—	—	—	—
1991–92	United States	Intl	45	10	10	20	141	—	—	—	—	—
1991–92	Winnipeg Jets	NHL	17	3	5	8	28	7	3	0	3	30
1992–93	Winnipeg Jets	NHL	83	28	23	51	201	6	4	0	4	14
1993–94	Winnipeg Jets	NHL	84	41	40	81	255	—	—	—	—	—
1994–95	Winnipeg Jets	NHL	48	22	29	51	152	—	—	—	—	—
1995–96	Winnipeg Jets	NHL	76	50	48	98	156	6	1	2	3	22
1996–97	Phoenix Coyotes	NHL	81	52	34	86	228	7	6	0	6	7
1997–98	Phoenix Coyotes	NHL	69	40	26	66	147	6	3	3	6	10
1998–99	Phoenix Coyotes	NHL	68	36	32	68	151	7	1	3	4	13
1999–00	Phoenix Coyotes	NHL	50	22	21	43	82	5	1	1	2	4
2000–01	Phoenix Coyotes	NHL	64	29	42	71	108	—	—	—	—	—
2000–01	St. Louis Blues	NHL	12	6	2	8	14	15	2	7	9	20
2001–02	St. Louis Blues	NHL	73	38	37	75	117	10	5	5	10	18
2002–03	St. Louis Blues	NHL	56	31	24	55	139	7	1	3	4	14
2003–04	St. Louis Blues	NHL	75	33	38	71	83	5	0	2	2	10
2005–06	St. Louis Blues	NHL	41	15	21	36	46	—	—	—	—	—
2006–07	St. Louis Blues	NHL	61	20	23	43	92	—	—	—	—	—
2006–07	Atlanta Thrashers	NHL	18	7	8	15	34	4	1	2	3	12
2007–08	St. Louis Blues	NHL	79	27	31	58	69	—	—	—	—	—
2008–09	St. Louis Blues	NHL	79	25	24	49	61	4	0	0	0	2
2009–10	St. Louis Blues	NHL	67	13	19	32	56	—	—	—	—	—
NHL totals			1,201	538	527	1,065	2,219	89	28	28	56	176

=== International ===
Year	Team	Event	GP	G	A	Pts	PIM
1991	United States	WJC	7	6	3	9	12
1992	United States	WJC	7	3	4	7	6
1992	United States	OLY	8	1	1	2	12
1996	United States	WCH	7	5	1	6	44
1998	United States	OLY	4	0	2	2	6
2002	United States	OLY	5	2	0	2	2
2004	United States	WCH	5	5	1	6	23
2006	United States	OLY	6	0	0	0	8
Junior totals			14	9	7	16	18
Senior totals			35	13	5	18	85

== Awards and honors ==
Award	Year
College
All-Hockey East Rookie Team	1991
NHL
Second All-Star team	1995, 1998
All-Star Game	1997, 1998, 1999, 2004, 2009
USA Hockey
Hall of Fame	2012

== See also ==
- Power forward (ice hockey)
- List of NHL players with 50 goal seasons
- List of NHL players with 500 goals
- List of NHL players with 1,000 points
- List of NHL players with 2,000 career penalty minutes
- List of NHL players with 1,000 games played

Awards and achievements
Preceded by Stu Barnes	Winnipeg Jets first-round draft pick 1990	Succeeded by Aaron Ward
Preceded by Dean Kennedy	Winnipeg Jets captain 1993–95	Succeeded by Kris King
Preceded by Position created	Phoenix Coyotes captain 1996–2001	Succeeded by Teppo Numminen
