= Shane Doan =

Canadian ice hockey player (born 1976)

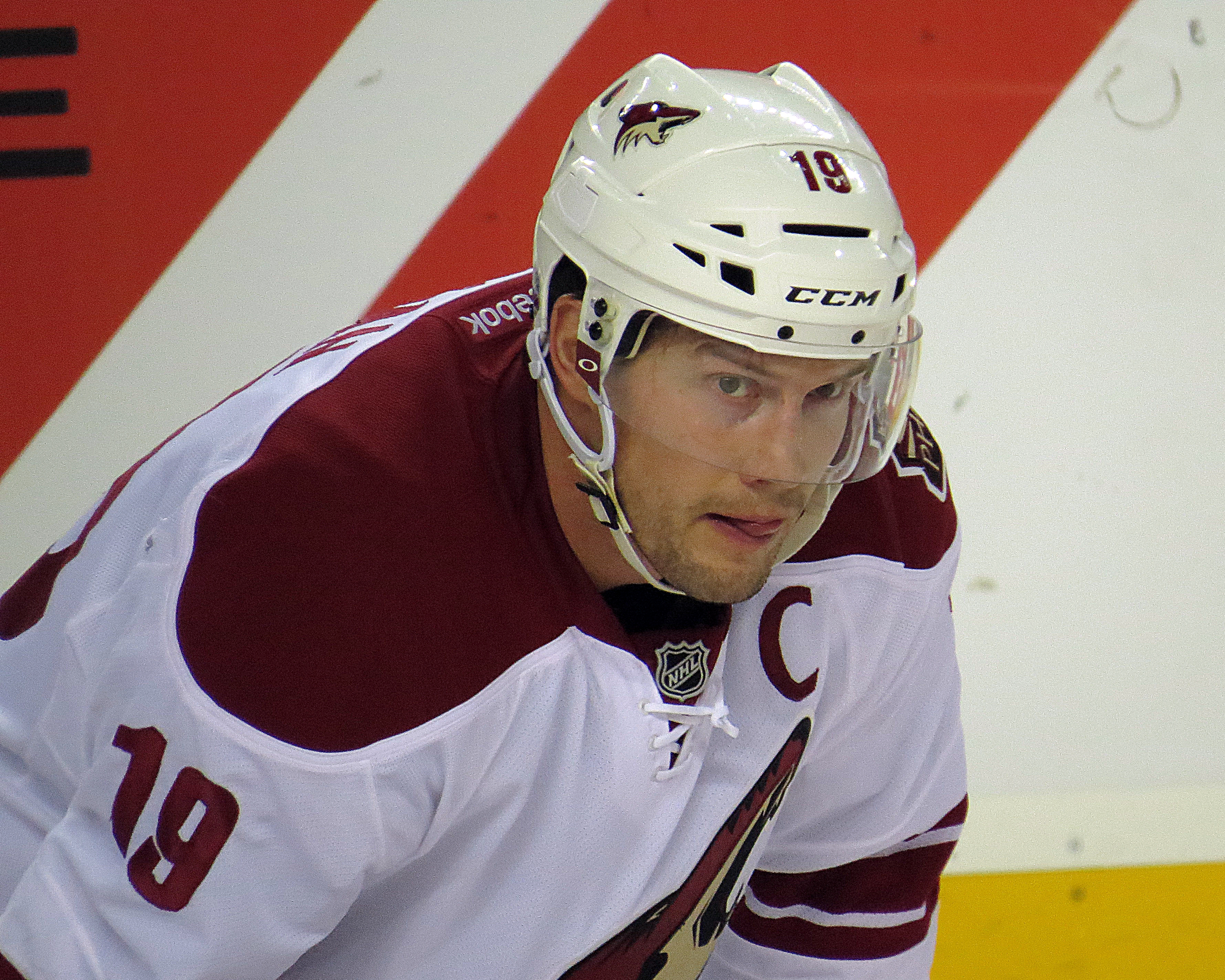
- Doan with the Phoenix Coyotes in 2014
- Born: October 10, 1976 (age 50) Halkirk, Alberta, Canada
- Height: 6 ft 1 in (185 cm)
- Weight: 223 lb (101 kg; 15 st 13 lb)
- Position: Right wing
- Shot: Right
- Played for: Winnipeg Jets; Phoenix/Arizona Coyotes
- National team: Canada
- NHL draft: 7th overall, 1995; Winnipeg Jets
- Playing career: 1995–2017
Medal record
Representing Canada
Ice hockey
World Championships
Gold medal – first place	2003 Finland
Gold medal – first place	2007 Russia
Silver medal – second place	2005 Austria
Silver medal – second place	2008 Canada
Silver medal – second place	2009 Switzerland

Shane Albert Doan (born October 10, 1976) is a Canadian ice hockey executive and former player. Doan spent the entirety of his 21-season NHL career with the Arizona Coyotes franchise, beginning with the original Winnipeg Jets in 1995 before playing in Arizona for two decades. He was the last remaining player active in the NHL from the original Winnipeg Jets franchise before he announced his retirement in the summer of 2017.

Doan led the Phoenix Coyotes in scoring in every season between 2003 and 2011. In December 2015, Doan became the Coyotes franchise's all-time leading goal scorer. He was also the longest-serving NHL captain until his retirement, serving in that capacity for the Coyotes from 2003 to 2017; which gave him the nickname, Captain Coyote among fans. Doan never won the Stanley Cup, coming closest when his Phoenix Coyotes lost to the Los Angeles Kings in the 2012 Western Conference Final.

In international competition, Doan represented Canada and won five medals (two gold, three silver) at the World Championships. He helped Canada win the World Cup championship in 2004 and was also a member of Canada's 2006 Winter Olympic team.

The Coyotes retired Doan's jersey number prior to a game against the current Winnipeg Jets on February 24, 2019. He subsequently joined the Coyotes front office on January 11, 2021.

== Playing career ==
=== Kamloops Blazers ===
Doan began his career in the Western Hockey League (WHL) with the Kamloops Blazers in 1992, and spent three seasons with the team. He won the Memorial Cup with the Blazers in 1994 and 1995. He had his most successful season with the team during the 1994–95 season, when he recorded 94 points, helping the team win the Memorial Cup for a second straight year, and was also awarded the Stafford Smythe Memorial Trophy as the tournament's MVP. Doan loved his time in Kamloops, and returns there in summer months.

=== Winnipeg Jets / Phoenix / Arizona Coyotes ===
Doan was drafted by the Winnipeg Jets in the first round, seventh overall, in the 1995 NHL entry draft. He was the Jets' final first-round pick to play in the NHL prior to the franchise moving to Phoenix. He immediately made the transition from major junior to the NHL in 1995–96 and tallied 17 points in his rookie season with the Jets. He scored his first NHL goal against Ed Belfour of the Chicago Blackhawks, and later scored the overtime goal to win the game 6–5. Perhaps Doan's most memorable moment as a Jet was his seventh and final goal as a Jet, which came on April 12, 1996, during the team's last regular season home game, where he scored the game-winning goal against the Los Angeles Kings in the second period to make the score 4–2 for Winnipeg. The game would finish 5–3 and the win clinched a playoff spot for the Jets. In the playoffs, the Jets were matched up against the first seeded Detroit Red Wings and lost in six games.

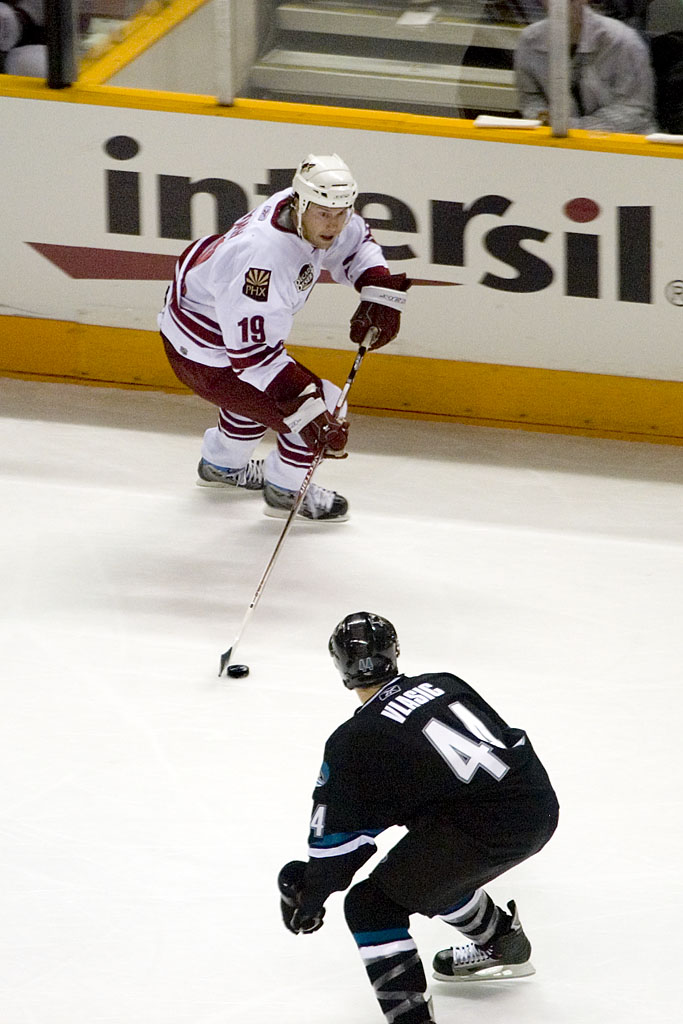
Shane Doan in 2006

After the Jets relocated to Phoenix and became the Coyotes the following season, Doan's points total did not improve greatly until the 1999–2000 season, when he scored 26 goals (the first of nine consecutive 20-goal seasons for Doan). After the departure of team captain Teppo Numminen, Doan assumed the captaincy in 2003–04 and scored which were then career-highs in all statistical categories with 27 goals, 41 assists and 68 points. During the season, Doan was selected to play in his first NHL All-Star Game in 2004. He then hit the 30-goal mark for the first time in his career the following season to go with 36 assists and 66 points.

On December 13, 2005, during a game against the Montreal Canadiens, he was involved in a controversy concerning discriminatory remarks made towards French-speaking referees. Liberal MP Denis Coderre then asked to remove Doan from the Canadian team taking part in the Olympic Games. Wayne Gretzky, being the owner and head coach of the Coyotes as well as the director of the Olympic committee, decided to leave his protégé in training. In January 2006, Doan, who denied having made the remarks toward the referees, sued Coderre for defamation, then in April 2007 Coderre sued Doan in return, also for defamation. In August 2010, the two parties decided to settle the matter amicably at which Doan admitted these comments were made by a Coyotes player on the ice.

Late in the 2006–07 season, Doan agreed to a five-year, $22.75 million contract extension with the Coyotes on February 14, 2007. He responded the following season with his best season to date when he led the Coyotes in scoring in 2007–08 with 28 goals and a career-high 50 assists for 78 points. In 2008–09, Doan was selected to the 2009 NHL All-Star Game and won the inaugural elimination shootout segment of the skills competition, outlasting Marc Savard of the Boston Bruins in the seventh round. He completed that season with his second-straight 70-point season and a career-high 31 goals.

On October 18, 2010, Doan was suspended for three games for a hit on Dan Sexton of the Anaheim Ducks the night previous. The NHL's disciplinarian, Colin Campbell, ruled that the hit was "a late hit from the blind side to the head of an unsuspecting opponent", violating the NHL's ban on blindside hits to the head. It was the first suspension of Doan's career.

Doan had a successful and memorable 2011–12 season for the Coyotes, leading his team to their most successful regular season to date, as the Coyotes finished third in the Western Conference and won their first division title. Also that season, he scored 50 points (22 goals and 28 assists) and his first NHL hat-trick, on January 7, 2012, at 19:59 of the third period in the 1,161st game of his NHL career. Doan would also lead the Coyotes to their most successful playoff performance, contributing nine points to lead the Coyotes to their first and second playoff series victories over the Chicago Blackhawks in six games and the Nashville Predators in five, respectively, as well as the team's first ever conference final appearance, where they would lose in five games to the eventual Stanley Cup champions Los Angeles Kings.

On September 14, 2012, Doan agreed to a four-year, $21.2 million contract extension with the Coyotes. As of the start of the 2014–15 season, Doan was the all-time leader in games played with the Jets/Coyotes franchise, and by scoring two goals and an assist in the February 12, 2016, game against the Calgary Flames, he moved into first place all-time in points for the Jets/Coyotes franchise with 931.

On December 29, 2015, Doan recorded his second career hat trick in a 7–5 loss against the Chicago Blackhawks. With this accomplishment, Doan became the 15th player ever to record two hat tricks after turning 35. He also tied Dale Hawerchuk's franchise record for all-time goals scored. On December 31, 2015, Doan scored twice against the Winnipeg Jets to become the all-time leading goal scorer for the Winnipeg/Phoenix/Arizona franchise with 381 goals.

On July 12, 2016, Doan agreed to a one-year, $5 million contract with the Coyotes. At the start of the 2016–17 season, Doan was the longest-serving captain in the NHL, having been named Coyotes captain prior to the 2003–04 season, was tenth in points among active NHL players, and was two points away from surpassing Dale Hawerchuk in all-time Jets/Coyotes points. Entering the season, he was 96th in all-time NHL points. On June 19, 2017, it was announced the Coyotes were parting ways with Doan, leaving him unprotected in 2017 NHL expansion draft and opting not to re-sign him for the 2017–18 season. The Coyotes left a standing offer to Doan to remain with the team in a non-playing role.

On August 30, 2017, Doan officially announced his retirement from the NHL. He became the first and only player to have his jersey number retired by the Coyotes (all other numbers that would never be worn by anyone else throughout the rest of the team's existence were only considered honored by the team instead of retired), with the team raising his No. 19 to the rafters at the Gila River Arena (now Desert Diamond Arena) prior to a game against the current rendition of the Winnipeg Jets on February 24, 2019. After the Coyotes moved out in 2022, the banner was intended to be thrown away. Instead, an arena worker recovered Doan's jersey banner and returned it to Doan himself after the Coyotes' final NHL home game in April 2024. The franchise would subsequently relocate to Utah in the off-season. Doan's Coyotes banner is currently held at the Ice Den in Scottsdale, Arizona following the Coyotes' departure.

== Executive career ==
On October 10, 2007, Doan purchased a minority share in the Kamloops Blazers, along with fellow NHL players Jarome Iginla, Mark Recchi, and Darryl Sydor, as well as future Dallas Stars owner Tom Gaglardi.

On January 11, 2021, the Coyotes hired Doan in an executive capacity as the team's chief hockey development officer. He served in that capacity for the next two seasons before being hired by the Toronto Maple Leafs as Special Advisor to the General Manager, on June 9, 2023.

Doan has also served in various capacities with Team Canada, first starting as a consultant for the 2019 World Championship before being named general manager for the 2021 Channel One Cup (where he also acted as assistant coach), 2022 Olympics, 2022 World Championships, and 2022 Spengler Cup. He has also served as an assistant general manager for the 2019 Spengler Cup, and 2021 and 2023 World Championships.

== International play ==
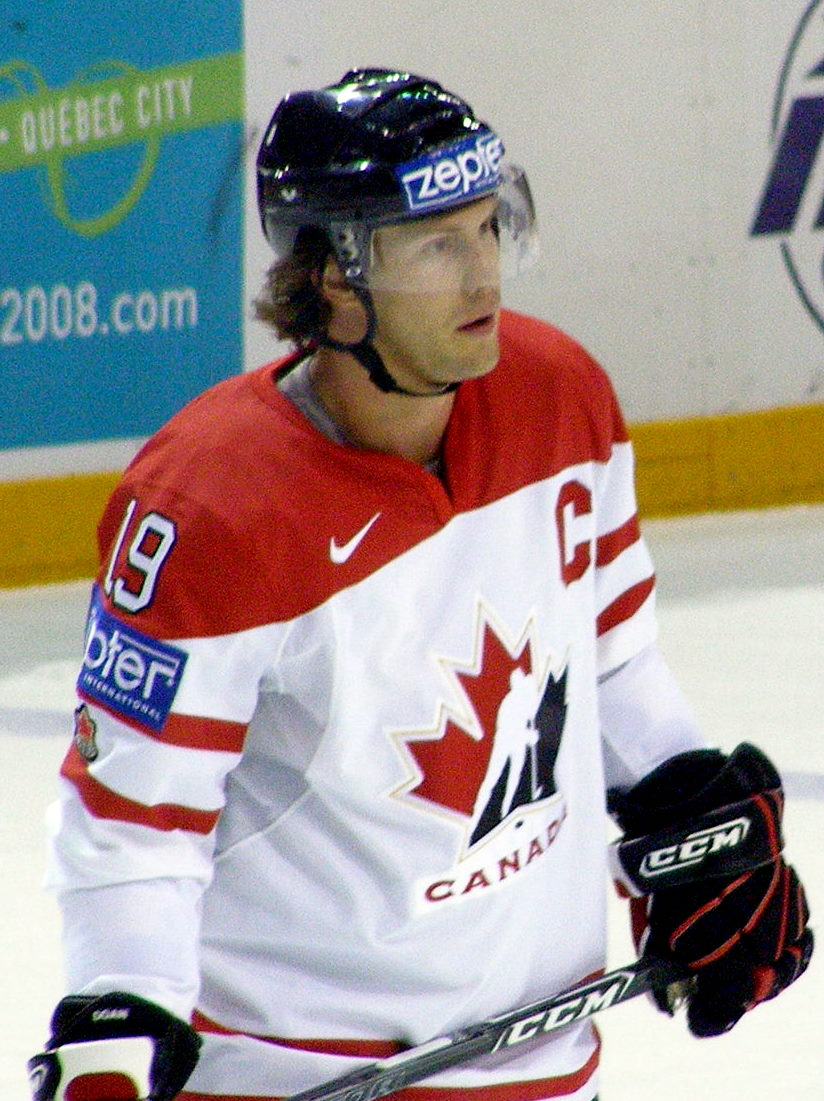
Doan at the 2008 World Championships

Doan made his international debut for Canada at the 1999 World Championships in Norway and finished fourth with the team. He then won his first gold medal four years later at the 2003 World Championships in Finland. Prior to the 2004–05 NHL lock-out, Doan competed in the 2004 World Cup and scored the game-winning goal in the finals against Finland to win the championship. Doan had also been named to Canada's 2004 World Championship team several months earlier, but could not attend due to injury.

In 2005, Doan was named an alternate captain for Canada and helped lead the team to a silver medal at the World Championships in Austria. Two years later, he was promoted to team captain at the 2007 World Championships in Moscow. During the tournament, he scored the game-winning goal in a 4–2 preliminary round victory over Norway, then scored a hat-trick in a span of 6:25 in a 6–3 qualification round victory over Belarus. Canada went undefeated en route to a 4–2 gold medal game victory over Finland in the final. He remained captain for the 2008 World Championships and won his second silver, losing to Russia in the gold medal game.

=== Controversy ===
When Doan was selected for the 2006 Olympics, Canadian Liberal Member of Parliament Denis Coderre wrote a letter to Hockey Canada president Bob Nicholson asking him to remove Doan from the team unless Doan apologized for an alleged slur of French-Canadians he used on December 13, 2005, against a Quebecer referee during a game against the Montreal Canadiens. In January 2006, Doan filed a lawsuit against Coderre for defamation, seeking $250,000 in damages and promising to contribute any damage awards to charity. Coderre filed a counter-suit in April 2007, seeking $45,000 in damages.

When Doan was selected as captain on the 2007 Canadian national men's hockey team, a Canadian Official Languages parliamentary committee demanded Hockey Canada appear before the committee to explain its decision to name Doan as captain in light of the aforementioned alleged comment. Doan's selection was maintained, citing that an NHL investigation had cleared him of any wrongdoing.

Prior to Doan's trial, set to take place in September 2010, he and Coderre agreed to an out of court settlement, stating that the Superior Court of Montreal could put its resources to better use if the matter was settled. Doan stated in the settlement that another player on the ice did utter the racial comments. The settlement also stated Coderre was wrong.

== Personal life ==
Doan was born on October 10, 1976, in Halkirk, Alberta, to Bernie and Bernice Doan. His father, Bernie Doan (born June 27, 1951), was drafted by the St. Louis Blues in the sixth round, 80th overall, of the 1971 NHL Amateur Draft and briefly played professionally during the 1971–72 season with the Kansas City Blues and Toledo Hornets. His parents ran a Christian summer camp in Halkirk called Circle Square Ranch. Growing up in a religious family, Doan continues to be a practising Christian; he writes the Bible verse Romans 8:28 on his hockey sticks.

Doan and his wife Andrea have four children and reside in Scottsdale, Arizona. The family spends their summers in Kamloops where Doan played junior ice hockey and met his wife. His son Josh Doan plays for the Buffalo Sabres.

Doan is a second cousin of Carey Price, a goaltender for the Montreal Canadiens, and also a first cousin of Keaton Ellerby, who last played for the Sheffield Steelers of the Elite Ice Hockey League, and Catriona Le May Doan, a two-time Olympic gold medallist in speed skating through marriage to her husband Bart Doan.

In April 2011, Doan, along with his brother Brook, were the "prey" on the television series Mantracker, successfully completing it.

Doan served as a pallbearer at the funeral service of American politician John McCain in Arizona.

Following the departure of the Coyotes from Arizona in 2024, his wife Andrea joined the Maricopa County committee focused on bringing the team back in September 2025 as the head of the group.

== Career statistics ==
=== Regular season and playoffs ===
			Regular season					Playoffs
Season	Team	League	GP	G	A	Pts	PIM	GP	G	A	Pts	PIM
1991–92	Killam Selects	AAHA	56	80	84	164	74	—	—	—	—	—
1992–93	Kamloops Blazers	WHL	51	7	12	19	55	13	0	1	1	8
1993–94	Kamloops Blazers	WHL	52	24	24	48	88	—	—	—	—	—
1994–95	Kamloops Blazers	WHL	71	37	57	94	106	21	6	10	16	16
1995–96	Winnipeg Jets	NHL	74	7	10	17	101	6	0	0	0	6
1996–97	Phoenix Coyotes	NHL	63	4	8	12	49	4	0	0	0	2
1997–98	Springfield Falcons	AHL	39	21	21	42	64	—	—	—	—	—
1997–98	Phoenix Coyotes	NHL	33	5	6	11	35	6	1	0	1	6
1998–99	Phoenix Coyotes	NHL	79	6	16	22	54	7	2	2	4	6
1999–00	Phoenix Coyotes	NHL	81	26	25	51	66	4	1	2	3	8
2000–01	Phoenix Coyotes	NHL	76	26	37	63	89	—	—	—	—	—
2001–02	Phoenix Coyotes	NHL	81	20	29	49	61	5	2	2	4	6
2002–03	Phoenix Coyotes	NHL	82	21	37	58	86	—	—	—	—	—
2003–04	Phoenix Coyotes	NHL	79	27	41	68	47	—	—	—	—	—
2005–06	Phoenix Coyotes	NHL	82	30	36	66	123	—	—	—	—	—
2006–07	Phoenix Coyotes	NHL	73	27	28	55	73	—	—	—	—	—
2007–08	Phoenix Coyotes	NHL	80	28	50	78	59	—	—	—	—	—
2008–09	Phoenix Coyotes	NHL	82	31	42	73	72	—	—	—	—	—
2009–10	Phoenix Coyotes	NHL	82	18	37	55	41	3	1	1	2	4
2010–11	Phoenix Coyotes	NHL	72	20	40	60	67	4	3	2	5	6
2011–12	Phoenix Coyotes	NHL	79	22	28	50	48	16	5	4	9	41
2012–13	Phoenix Coyotes	NHL	48	13	14	27	37	—	—	—	—	—
2013–14	Phoenix Coyotes	NHL	69	23	24	47	34	—	—	—	—	—
2014–15	Arizona Coyotes	NHL	79	14	22	36	65	—	—	—	—	—
2015–16	Arizona Coyotes	NHL	72	28	19	47	98	—	—	—	—	—
2016–17	Arizona Coyotes	NHL	74	6	21	27	48	—	—	—	—	—
NHL totals			1,540	402	570	972	1,353	55	15	13	28	85

=== International ===
Year	Team	Event	GP	G	A	Pts	PIM
1999	Canada	WC	4	0	0	0	0
2003	Canada	WC	9	4	2	6	12
2004	Canada	WCH	6	1	1	2	2
2005	Canada	WC	9	1	3	4	2
2006	Canada	OLY	6	2	1	3	2
2007	Canada	WC	9	5	5	10	8
2008	Canada	WC	9	2	4	6	6
2009	Canada	WC	9	1	6	7	14
Senior totals			61	16	22	38	46

== Awards and honours ==
Award	Year	Ref
CHL
Memorial Cup champion	1994, 1995	
Memorial Cup All-Star Team	1995	
Stafford Smythe Memorial Trophy	1995	
NHL
All-Star Game	2004, 2009	
King Clancy Memorial Trophy	2010	
Mark Messier Leadership Award	2012	

== Records ==
- Phoenix/Arizona Coyotes/Winnipeg Jets record for career points (972).
- Phoenix/Arizona Coyotes/Winnipeg Jets record for career goals (402).
- Phoenix/Arizona Coyotes/Winnipeg Jets record for games played (1540).
- Phoenix/Arizona Coyotes/Winnipeg Jets record for career game-winning goals (69).
- Phoenix/Arizona Coyotes/Winnipeg Jets record for career power play goals (125).
- Phoenix/Arizona Coyotes/Winnipeg Jets record for career shots on goal (3801).

Awards and achievements
Preceded by Mats Lindgren	Winnipeg Jets first-round draft pick 1995	Succeeded by Dan Focht
Preceded by Teppo Numminen	Phoenix/Arizona Coyotes captain 2003–2017	Succeeded by Oliver Ekman-Larsson
Preceded by Ethan Moreau	King Clancy Memorial Trophy; 2010	Succeeded by Doug Weight
