= Teppo Numminen =

Finnish ice hockey player (born 1968)

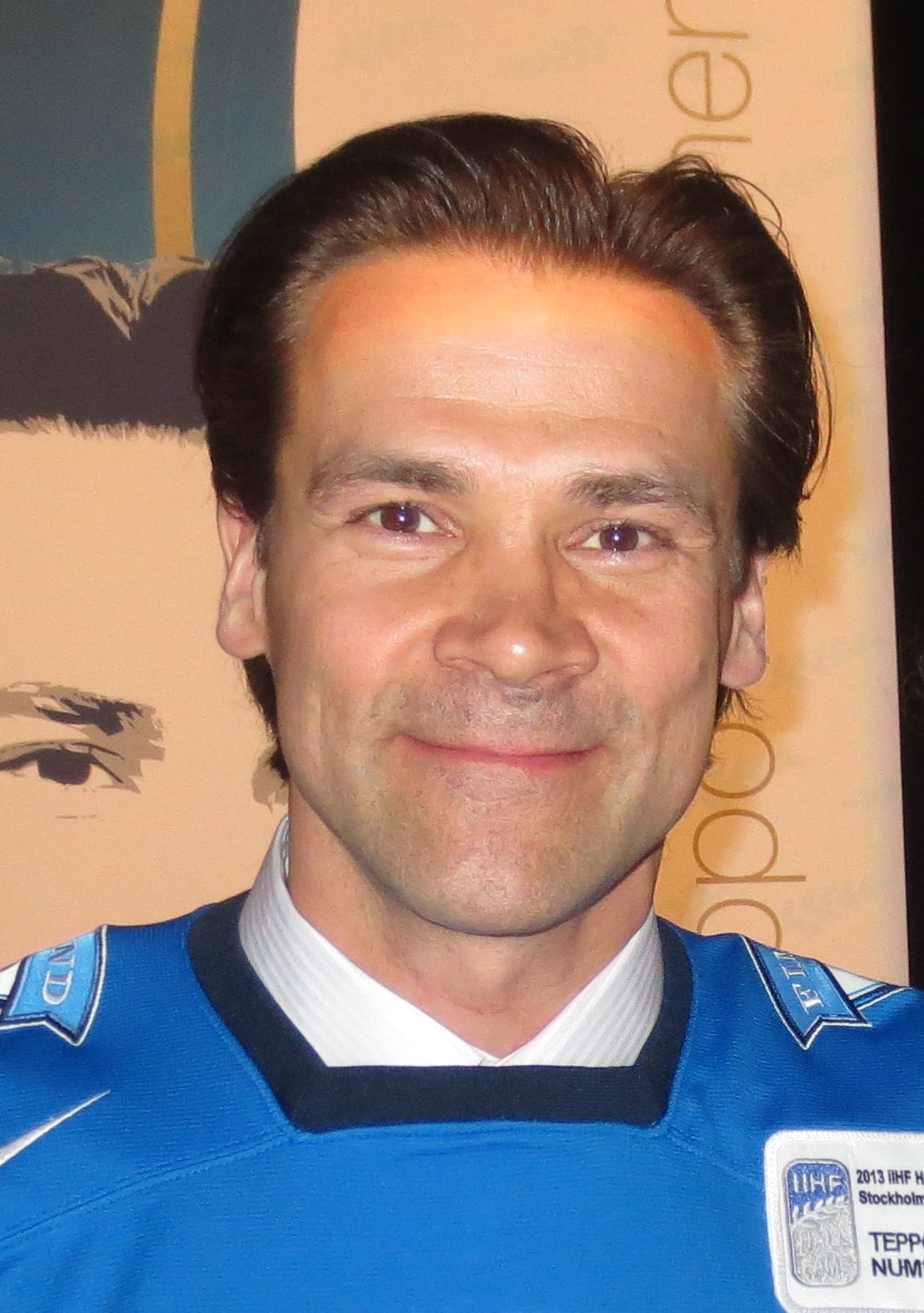
- Numminen in 2013
- Born: July 3, 1968 (age 58) Tampere, Finland
- Height: 6 ft 2 in (188 cm)
- Weight: 198 lb (90 kg; 14 st 2 lb)
- Position: Defence
- Shot: Right
- Played for: Tappara; Winnipeg Jets; TuTo; Phoenix Coyotes; Dallas Stars; Buffalo Sabres
- National team: Finland
- NHL draft: 29th overall, 1986; Winnipeg Jets
- Playing career: 1985–2009
Medal record
Representing Finland
Men's ice hockey
European Junior Championships
Gold medal – first place	1986 West Germany
World Junior Championships
Silver medal – second place	1988 Soviet Union
Olympic Games
Silver medal – second place	1988 Calgary
Silver medal – second place	2006 Turin
Bronze medal – third place	1998 Nagano
World Cup of Hockey
Silver medal – second place	2004 World Cup

Teppo Kalevi Numminen (born July 3, 1968) is a Finnish former professional ice hockey defenceman who played in the National Hockey League (NHL). He played for Tappara and TuTo of the SM-liiga and the Winnipeg Jets, Phoenix Coyotes, Dallas Stars and Buffalo Sabres of the National Hockey League (NHL). Internationally, he represented the Finland men's national ice hockey team, and was inducted into the IIHF Hall of Fame in 2013.

== Playing career ==
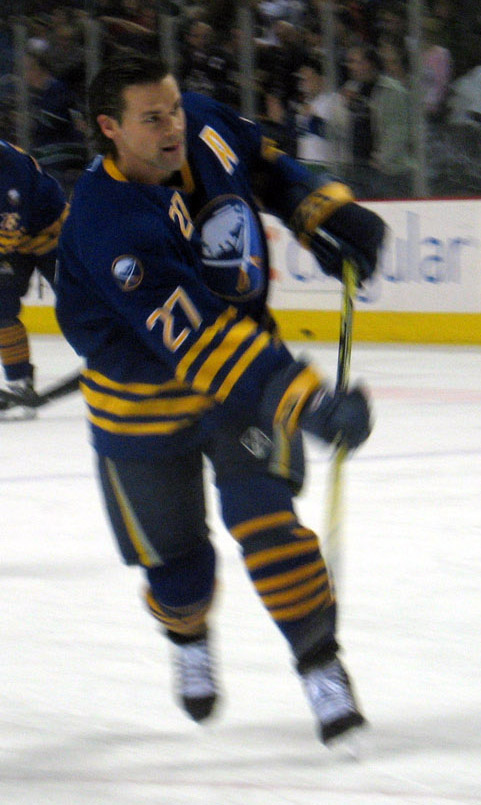
Numminen playing with the Buffalo Sabres in 2007

Numminen started his career with his local team, Tappara, in the SM-liiga. Drafted in the second round (twenty-ninth overall) in the 1986 NHL entry draft by the Winnipeg Jets, Numminen moved to North America in 1988 to play for the Jets. He moved with the team as it became the Phoenix Coyotes before the 1996–97 season. He played in the NHL All-Star Game in 1999, 2000 and 2001. After fifteen seasons playing for the Winnipeg/Phoenix organization, Numminen was traded to the Dallas Stars in July 2003, for Mike Sillinger. Numminen took a break from hockey during the 2004–05 NHL lockout, then signed as a free agent with the Buffalo Sabres.

On November 13, 2006, Numminen played his 1,252nd game in the NHL, thus setting a record for most NHL games played by a European-trained player, surpassing Jari Kurri.

After signing a one-year contract for the 2007–08 season, Numminen was forced to undergo open heart surgery before the start of the season. Numminen was suspended by the Sabres when it was discovered he needed heart surgery. Sabres' general manager Darcy Regier stated the suspension was because his $2.6 million contract was not insured, and the contract contained a clause, which stated that player must have passed the physical and had to be fit to play.

Word came that Numminen's heart surgery was successful. Completed on September 20, 2007, at the Cleveland Clinic, the surgery was performed to repair a faulty valve. Numminen was able to return to action for the final game of the Sabres' 2007–08 season on April 5, 2008.

Per a statement by general manager Regier, Numminen expressed some interest in returning to NHL play for at least another year. On August 8, 2008, Numminen re-signed with the Buffalo Sabres.

He was the leader among active NHL players who played the most games without winning the Stanley Cup: 1,372 at the end of the 2008-09 season.

Numminen announced his retirement on August 4, 2009. The 41-year-old finished his NHL career with 117 goals and 520 assists for 637 points in 1372 NHL games. At the time of his retirement, Numminen was the last player from the 1986 NHL entry draft still playing in the NHL and he had extended his record to 1,372 NHL games, the most by a European-born and trained player at any position, which stood until broken by Nicklas Lidström in the 2009–10 season.

On January 30, 2010, the Coyotes enshrined Numminen's number 27 jersey into the ring of honor. During his 15 seasons for the franchise, including their previous incarnation as the Winnipeg Jets, he played 1,098 games, a then franchise record. His 534 points are also a franchise record for defencemen.

=== International play ===
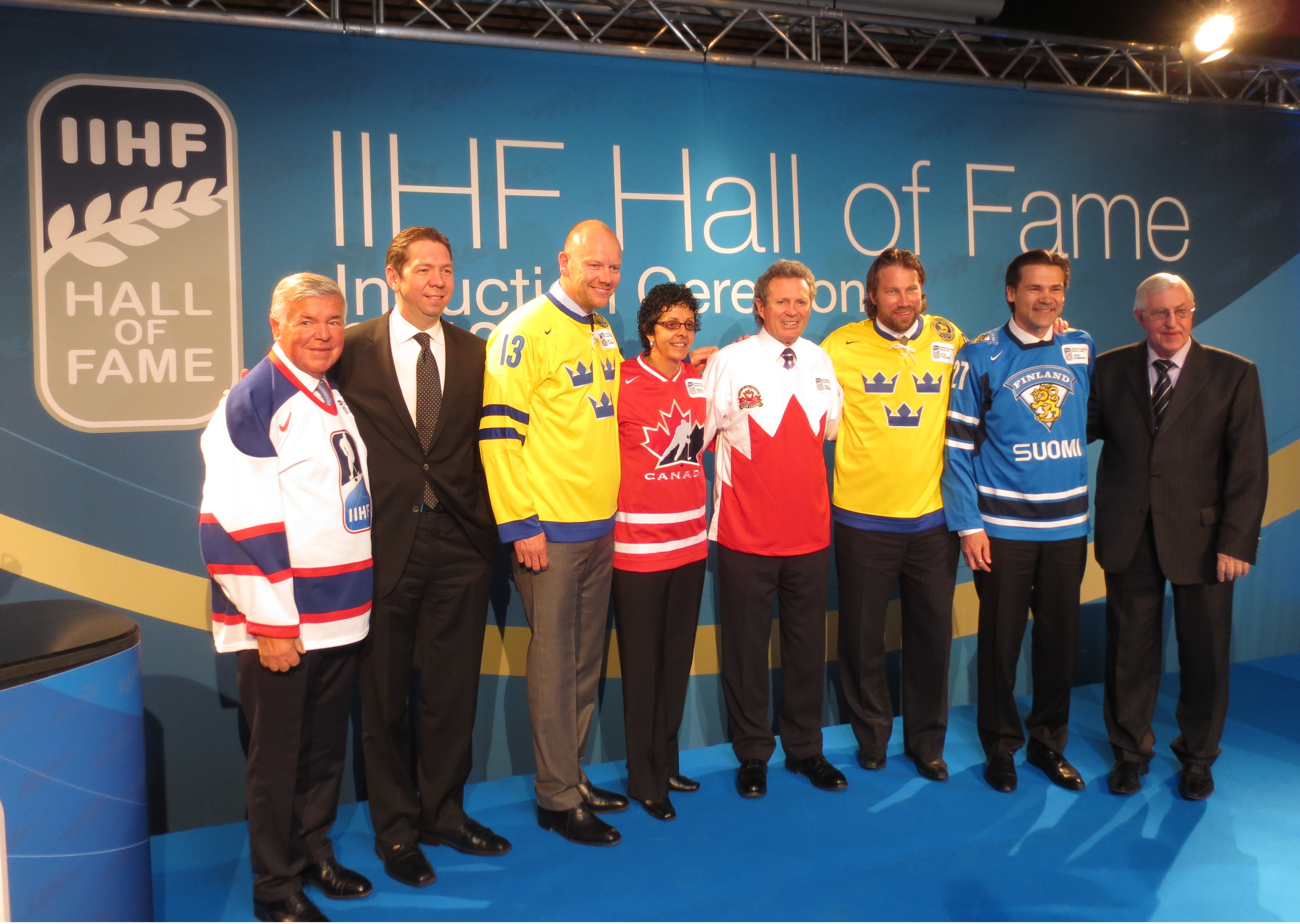
IIHF Hall of Fame in 2013: Jan-Åke Edvinsson, Gord Miller, Mats Sundin, Danielle Goyette, Paul Henderson, Peter Forsberg, Teppo Numminen and Boris Mikhailov

Numminen represented the Finnish men's national team and won two silver medals in 1988 and 2006, and one bronze medal in 1998 Winter Olympics.

Numminen was inducted into the IIHF Hall of Fame in 2013.

== Personal life ==
Numminen and his wife Ann-Maarit have two daughters, Bianca and Erica, and one son, Nicklas. His brother, center Teemu Numminen (born December 23, 1973) was drafted 229th overall in the 1992 NHL entry draft by the Winnipeg Jets but he never made it to the NHL.

Numminen used to own 80% of Montreal Sports Ltd, which was a company founded by his father, Kalevi. The company produced ice hockey sticks and equipment and was sold to the large hockey brand Warrior.

== Career statistics ==
=== Regular season and playoffs ===
			Regular season					Playoffs
Season	Team	League	GP	G	A	Pts	PIM	GP	G	A	Pts	PIM
1984–85	Whitby Lawmen	OJHL	16	3	9	12	0	—	—	—	—	—
1985–86	Tappara	Fin-Jr.	2	0	0	0	0	3	0	1	1	2
1985–86	Tappara	SM-liiga	31	2	4	6	6	8	0	0	0	0
1986–87	Tappara	SM-liiga	44	9	9	18	16	9	4	1	5	4
1987–88	Tappara	SM-liiga	40	10	10	20	29	10	6	6	12	6
1988–89	Winnipeg Jets	NHL	69	1	14	15	36	—	—	—	—	—
1989–90	Winnipeg Jets	NHL	79	11	32	43	20	7	1	2	3	10
1990–91	Winnipeg Jets	NHL	80	8	25	33	20	—	—	—	—	—
1991–92	Winnipeg Jets	NHL	80	5	34	39	32	7	0	0	0	0
1992–93	Winnipeg Jets	NHL	66	7	30	37	33	6	1	1	2	2
1993–94	Winnipeg Jets	NHL	57	5	18	23	28	—	—	—	—	—
1994–95	Winnipeg Jets	NHL	42	5	16	21	16	—	—	—	—	—
1994–95	TuTo	SM-liiga	12	3	8	11	4	—	—	—	—	—
1995–96	Winnipeg Jets	NHL	74	11	43	54	22	6	0	0	0	2
1996–97	Phoenix Coyotes	NHL	82	2	25	27	28	7	3	3	6	0
1997–98	Phoenix Coyotes	NHL	82	11	40	51	30	1	0	0	0	0
1998–99	Phoenix Coyotes	NHL	82	10	30	40	30	7	2	1	3	4
1999–00	Phoenix Coyotes	NHL	79	8	34	42	16	5	1	1	2	0
2000–01	Phoenix Coyotes	NHL	72	5	26	31	36	—	—	—	—	—
2001–02	Phoenix Coyotes	NHL	76	13	35	48	20	4	0	0	0	2
2002–03	Phoenix Coyotes	NHL	78	6	24	30	30	—	—	—	—	—
2003–04	Dallas Stars	NHL	62	3	14	17	18	4	0	1	1	0
2005–06	Buffalo Sabres	NHL	75	2	38	40	36	12	1	1	2	4
2006–07	Buffalo Sabres	NHL	79	2	27	29	32	16	0	4	4	4
2007–08	Buffalo Sabres	NHL	1	0	0	0	0	—	—	—	—	—
2008–09	Buffalo Sabres	NHL	57	2	15	17	22	—	—	—	—	—
SM-liiga totals			127	24	31	55	55	27	10	7	17	10
NHL totals			1,372	117	520	637	513	82	9	14	23	28

=== International ===
Year	Team	Event	GP	G	A	Pts	PIM
1986	Finland	EJC	5	2	3	5	8
1987	Finland	WC	10	5	0	5	4
1987	Finland	CC	4	1	0	1	2
1988	Finland	WJC	7	5	2	7	4
1988	Finland	OLY	6	1	4	5	0
1991	Finland	WC	10	1	3	4	10
1991	Finland	CC	6	1	1	2	2
1996	Finland	WC	1	0	1	1	2
1996	Finland	WCH	2	0	0	0	0
1997	Finland	WC	5	2	2	4	6
1998	Finland	OLY	6	1	1	2	2
2002	Finland	OLY	4	0	1	1	0
2004	Finland	WCH	6	0	2	2	0
2006	Finland	OLY	8	2	1	3	2
Junior totals			12	7	5	12	12
Senior totals			68	13	17	30	30

== See also ==
- List of NHL players with 1,000 games played

Preceded by Keith Tkachuk	Phoenix Coyotes captain 2001–03	Succeeded by Shane Doan
