= 1998–99 Nashville Predators season =

Professional ice hockey team season

1998–99 Nashville Predators
- Division: 4th Central
- Conference: 12th Western
- 1998–99 record: 28–47–7
- Home record: 15–22–4
- Road record: 13–25–3
- Goals for: 190
- Goals against: 261

Team information
- General manager: David Poile
- Coach: Barry Trotz
- Captain: Tom Fitzgerald
- Arena: Nashville Arena
- Average attendance: 16,194
- Minor league affiliates: Milwaukee Admirals; Hampton Roads Admirals

Team leaders
- Goals: Sergei Krivokrasov (25)
- Assists: Cliff Ronning (35)
- Points: Cliff Ronning (53)
- Penalty minutes: Patrick Cote (242)
- Plus/minus: Rob Valicevic (+4)
- Wins: Mike Dunham (16)
- Goals against average: Tomas Vokoun (2.95)

The 1998–99 Nashville Predators season was the inaugural season of the Nashville Predators franchise, the first of four NHL teams added to the league between 1998 and 2000. The team accumulated 28 wins and 47 losses, with seven games ending in ties for a total of 63 points, finishing in 4th place in the Central Division and 12th in the Western Conference. The team failed to qualify for the Stanley Cup playoffs.

== Off-season ==
In the expansion draft, the Predators chose five goaltenders, including Mike Dunham and Tomas Vokoun, who would become their starting goaltenders, and Mike Richter, who was a free agent and chose not to sign with the Predators. In the 1998 NHL entry draft, the Predators chose David Legwand, a center, as their first-ever draft pick, second overall. On July 6, the Predators signed veteran forward Tom Fitzgerald to a three-year contract and immediately named him the franchise's first captain.

== Regular season ==
The Predators struggled on the power-play during the regular season, finishing 27th overall in the NHL in power-play goals scored (40). They also had the lowest penalty-kill percentage in the league, at 78.99%.

=== Season standings ===
Central Division
R	CR		GP	W	L	T	GF	GA	PIM	Pts
1	3	**Detroit Red Wings**	82	43	32	7	245	202	1202	93
2	5	**St. Louis Blues**	82	37	32	13	237	209	1308	87
3	10	Chicago Blackhawks	82	29	41	12	202	248	1807	70
4	12	Nashville Predators	82	28	47	7	190	261	1420	63

Western Conference
R		Div	GP	W	L	T	GF	GA	Pts
**1**	**p – Dallas Stars**	**PAC**	**82**	**51**	**19**	**12**	**236**	**168**	**114**
**2**	**y – Colorado Avalanche**	**NW**	**82**	**44**	**28**	**10**	**239**	**205**	**98**
**3**	**y – Detroit Red Wings**	**CEN**	**82**	**43**	**32**	**7**	**245**	**202**	**93**
**4**	**Phoenix Coyotes**	**PAC**	**82**	**39**	**31**	**12**	**205**	**197**	**90**
**5**	**St. Louis Blues**	**CEN**	**82**	**37**	**32**	**13**	**237**	**209**	**87**
**6**	**Mighty Ducks of Anaheim**	**PAC**	**82**	**35**	**34**	**13**	**215**	**206**	**83**
**7**	**San Jose Sharks**	**PAC**	**82**	**31**	**33**	**18**	**196**	**191**	**80**
**8**	**Edmonton Oilers**	**NW**	**82**	**33**	**37**	**12**	**230**	**226**	**78**
9	Calgary Flames	NW	82	30	40	12	211	234	72
10	Chicago Blackhawks	CEN	82	29	41	12	202	248	70
11	Los Angeles Kings	PAC	82	32	45	5	189	222	69
12	Nashville Predators	CEN	82	28	47	7	190	261	63
13	Vancouver Canucks	NW	82	23	47	12	192	258	58

Divisions: CEN – Central, PAC – Pacific, NW – Northwest

bold – Qualified for playoffs; p – Won Presidents' Trophy; y – Won division

== Schedule and results ==
1998–99 regular season
October: 3–5–1 (home: 3–2–0; road: 0–3–1)

Game	Date	Score	Opponent	Record	Recap
1	October 10, 1998	0–1	Florida Panthers (1998–99)	0–1–0	L
2	October 13, 1998	3–2	Carolina Hurricanes (1998–99)	1–1–0	W
3	October 17, 1998	1–3	@ Ottawa Senators (1998–99)	1–2–0	L
4	October 19, 1998	2–2 OT	@ Toronto Maple Leafs (1998–99)	1–2–1	T
5	October 21, 1998	2–5	@ Detroit Red Wings (1998–99)	1–3–1	L
6	October 23, 1998	3–4	Calgary Flames (1998–99)	1–4–1	L
7	October 24, 1998	4–5	@ Chicago Blackhawks (1998–99)	1–5–1	L
8	October 27, 1998	5–4	Vancouver Canucks (1998–99)	2–5–1	W
9	October 31, 1998	3–2	Colorado Avalanche (1998–99)	3–5–1	W

November: 6–7–0 (home: 3–2–0; road: 3–5–0)

Game	Date	Score	Opponent	Record	Recap
10	November 4, 1998	2–3	@ Edmonton Oilers (1998–99)	3–6–1	L
11	November 6, 1998	2–1	@ Calgary Flames (1998–99)	4–6–1	W
12	November 7, 1998	3–5	@ Vancouver Canucks (1998–99)	4–7–1	L
13	November 10, 1998	4–2	@ San Jose Sharks (1998–99)	5–7–1	W
14	November 12, 1998	3–1	@ Los Angeles Kings (1998–99)	6–7–1	W
15	November 14, 1998	1–5	@ St. Louis Blues (1998–99)	6–8–1	L
16	November 17, 1998	1–2	Chicago Blackhawks (1998–99)	6–9–1	L
17	November 19, 1998	3–2	St. Louis Blues (1998–99)	7–9–1	W
18	November 21, 1998	3–6	New York Islanders (1998–99)	7–10–1	L
19	November 24, 1998	0–4	@ St. Louis Blues (1998–99)	7–11–1	L
20	November 25, 1998	4–3	Calgary Flames (1998–99)	8–11–1	W
21	November 27, 1998	3–1	Mighty Ducks of Anaheim (1998–99)	9–11–1	W
22	November 29, 1998	1–5	@ New York Rangers (1998–99)	9–12–1	L

December: 4–6–2 (home: 3–3–2; road: 1–3–0)

Game	Date	Score	Opponent	Record	Recap
23	December 1, 1998	1–3	Ottawa Senators (1998–99)	9–13–1	L
24	December 5, 1998	1–3	Buffalo Sabres (1998–99)	9–14–1	L
25	December 8, 1998	3–3 OT	Edmonton Oilers (1998–99)	9–14–2	T
26	December 10, 1998	2–1	San Jose Sharks (1998–99)	10–14–2	W
27	December 12, 1998	2–2 OT	Montreal Canadiens (1998–99)	10–14–3	T
28	December 16, 1998	1–6	@ Mighty Ducks of Anaheim (1998–99)	10–15–3	L
29	December 17, 1998	1–3	@ San Jose Sharks (1998–99)	10–16–3	L
30	December 19, 1998	6–4	@ Vancouver Canucks (1998–99)	11–16–3	W
31	December 23, 1998	5–3	Detroit Red Wings (1998–99)	12–16–3	W
32	December 26, 1998	3–1	Washington Capitals (1998–99)	13–16–3	W
33	December 28, 1998	0–1	@ Dallas Stars (1998–99)	13–17–3	L
34	December 30, 1998	2–5	Boston Bruins (1998–99)	13–18–3	L

January: 5–9–1 (home: 3–5–1; road: 2–4–0)

Game	Date	Score	Opponent	Record	Recap
35	January 1, 1999	5–6	St. Louis Blues (1998–99)	13–19–3	L
36	January 2, 1999	1–4	@ Carolina Hurricanes (1998–99)	13–20–3	L
37	January 4, 1999	2–1	Mighty Ducks of Anaheim (1998–99)	14–20–3	W
38	January 7, 1999	3–4	San Jose Sharks (1998–99)	14–21–3	L
39	January 9, 1999	3–3 OT	Chicago Blackhawks (1998–99)	14–21–4	T
40	January 11, 1999	0–8	@ Philadelphia Flyers (1998–99)	14–22–4	L
41	January 14, 1999	1–2 OT	@ Detroit Red Wings (1998–99)	14–23–4	L
42	January 15, 1999	2–0	Phoenix Coyotes (1998–99)	15–23–4	W
43	January 18, 1999	1–8	@ Boston Bruins (1998–99)	15–24–4	L
44	January 19, 1999	4–1	Vancouver Canucks (1998–99)	16–24–4	W
45	January 21, 1999	2–3	Tampa Bay Lightning (1998–99)	16–25–4	L
46	January 26, 1999	1–4	Detroit Red Wings (1998–99)	16–26–4	L
47	January 28, 1999	4–2	@ Buffalo Sabres (1998–99)	17–26–4	W
48	January 30, 1999	3–2 OT	@ New Jersey Devils (1998–99)	18–26–4	W
49	January 31, 1999	1–5	Phoenix Coyotes (1998–99)	18–27–4	L

February: 3–6–2 (home: 0–4–1; road: 3–2–1)

Game	Date	Score	Opponent	Record	Recap
50	February 4, 1999	2–2 OT	@ Calgary Flames (1998–99)	18–27–5	T
51	February 5, 1999	2–4	@ Edmonton Oilers (1998–99)	18–28–5	L
52	February 9, 1999	2–5	Detroit Red Wings (1998–99)	18–29–5	L
53	February 12, 1999	2–1	@ New York Islanders (1998–99)	19–29–5	W
54	February 13, 1999	2–3 OT	Pittsburgh Penguins (1998–99)	19–30–5	L
55	February 15, 1999	4–7	New York Rangers (1998–99)	19–31–5	L
56	February 19, 1999	4–4 OT	Colorado Avalanche (1998–99)	19–31–6	T
57	February 20, 1999	4–3	@ St. Louis Blues (1998–99)	20–31–6	W
58	February 23, 1999	3–4	Dallas Stars (1998–99)	20–32–6	L
59	February 24, 1999	2–1	@ Dallas Stars (1998–99)	21–32–6	W
60	February 27, 1999	1–3	@ Colorado Avalanche (1998–99)	21–33–6	L

March: 5–8–1 (home: 2–3–0; road: 3–5–1)

Game	Date	Score	Opponent	Record	Recap
61	March 2, 1999	1–5	St. Louis Blues (1998–99)	21–34–6	L
62	March 4, 1999	4–3	@ Los Angeles Kings (1998–99)	22–34–6	W
63	March 5, 1999	2–3	@ Mighty Ducks of Anaheim (1998–99)	22–35–6	L
64	March 7, 1999	3–4	@ Phoenix Coyotes (1998–99)	22–36–6	L
65	March 10, 1999	2–5	@ Chicago Blackhawks (1998–99)	22–37–6	L
66	March 12, 1999	5–3	Chicago Blackhawks (1998–99)	23–37–6	W
67	March 14, 1999	3–1	Edmonton Oilers (1998–99)	24–37–6	W
68	March 16, 1999	2–4	Calgary Flames (1998–99)	24–38–6	L
69	March 18, 1999	2–3	@ Montreal Canadiens (1998–99)	24–39–6	L
70	March 20, 1999	1–1 OT	@ Pittsburgh Penguins (1998–99)	24–39–7	T
71	March 24, 1999	3–0	@ Tampa Bay Lightning (1998–99)	25–39–7	W
72	March 26, 1999	1–4	@ Florida Panthers (1998–99)	25–40–7	L
73	March 28, 1999	0–3	Dallas Stars (1998–99)	25–41–7	L
74	March 30, 1999	3–2	@ Washington Capitals (1998–99)	26–41–7	W

April: 2–6–0 (home: 1–3–0; road: 1–3–0)

Game	Date	Score	Opponent	Record	Recap
75	April 1, 1999	1–2	Philadelphia Flyers (1998–99)	26–42–7	L
76	April 3, 1999	3–2	Los Angeles Kings (1998–99)	27–42–7	W
77	April 7, 1999	1–4	@ Colorado Avalanche (1998–99)	27–43–7	L
78	April 9, 1999	4–3	@ Phoenix Coyotes (1998–99)	28–43–7	W
79	April 12, 1999	3–4	Los Angeles Kings (1998–99)	28–44–7	L
80	April 14, 1999	2–4	@ Detroit Red Wings (1998–99)	28–45–7	L
81	April 15, 1999	2–4	@ Chicago Blackhawks (1998–99)	28–46–7	L
82	April 17, 1999	1–4	New Jersey Devils (1998–99)	28–47–7	L

Legend: W Win (2 points) L Loss (0 points) T Tie (1 point)

== Player statistics ==
=== Scoring ===
- Position abbreviations: C = Center; D = Defense; G = Goaltender; LW = Left wing; RW = Right wing
- † = Joined team via a transaction (e.g., trade, waivers, signing) during the season. Stats reflect time with the Predators only.
- ‡ = Left team via a transaction (e.g., trade, waivers, release) during the season. Stats reflect time with the Predators only.

No.	Player	Pos	Regular season					
No.	Player	Pos	GP	G	A	Pts	+/-	PIM
7	Cliff Ronning†	C	72	18	35	53	−6	40
22	Greg Johnson	C	68	16	34	50	−8	24
25	Sergei Krivokrasov	RW	70	25	23	48	−5	42
71	Sebastien Bordeleau	C	72	16	24	40	−14	26
24	Scott Walker	RW	71	15	25	40	0	103
21	Tom Fitzgerald	RW	80	13	19	32	−18	48
19	Andrew Brunette	LW	77	11	20	31	−10	26
10	Patric Kjellberg	RW	71	11	20	31	−13	24
20	Jamie Heward	D	63	6	12	18	−24	44
43	Vitali Yachmenev	LW	55	7	10	17	−10	10
15	Drake Berehowsky	D	74	2	15	17	−9	140
28	Denny Lambert	LW	76	5	11	16	−3	218
42	Joel Bouchard	D	64	4	11	15	−10	60
23	Blair Atcheynum‡	RW	53	8	6	14	−10	16
27	John Slaney	D	46	2	12	14	−12	14
6	Bob Boughner	D	79	3	10	13	−6	137
44	Kimmo Timonen	D	50	4	8	12	−4	30
5	Jan Vopat	D	55	5	6	11	0	28
16	Ville Peltonen	LW	14	5	5	10	1	2
9	Darren Turcotte	C	40	4	5	9	−11	16
12	Rob Valicevic	RW	19	4	2	6	4	2
18	Mark Mowers	C	30	0	6	6	−4	4
36	J. J. Daigneault‡	D	35	2	2	4	−4	38
32	Jeff Daniels	LW	9	1	3	4	−1	2
7 (Note: Nelson wore number 38 in his first seven games.)	Jeff Nelson	C	9	2	1	3	−1	2
17	Patrick Cote	LW	70	1	2	3	−7	242
4	Jay More	D	18	0	2	2	2	18
8	Doug Friedman	LW	2	0	1	1	0	14
40	Karlis Skrastins	D	2	0	1	1	0	0
29	Tomas Vokoun	G	37	0	1	1		6
7 (Note: de Vries wore number 14 in his second game.)	Greg de Vries‡	D	6	0	0	0	−4	4
1	Mike Dunham	G	44	0	0	0		4
35	Eric Fichaud	G	9	0	0	0		0
47	Matt Henderson	RW	2	0	0	0	−1	2
2	Dan Keczmer†	D	16	0	0	0	−3	12
11	David Legwand	C	1	0	0	0	0	0
30	Chris Mason	G	3	0	0	0		0
12	Brad Smyth	RW	3	0	0	0	−1	6
50	Petr Sykora	C	2	0	0	0	−1	0
2	Rob Zettler	D	2	0	0	0	−2	2

=== Goaltending ===
No.	Player	Regular season									
No.	Player	GP	W	L	T	SA	GA	GAA	SV%	SO	TOI
1	Mike Dunham	44	16	23	3	1387	127	3.08	.908	1	2472
29	Tomas Vokoun	37	12	18	4	1041	96	2.95	.908	1	1954
35	Eric Fichaud	9	0	6	0	229	24	3.22	.895	0	447
30	Chris Mason	3	0	0	0	44	6	5.22	.864	0	69

== Awards and records ==
=== Awards ===
Type	Award/honor	Recipient	Ref
League (in-season)	NHL All-Star Game selection	Sergei Krivokrasov	

=== Milestones ===
Milestone	Player	Date	Ref
First game	Rob Valicevic	December 8, 1998	
First game	Chris Mason	December 16, 1998	
First game	Kimmo Timonen	December 16, 1998	
First game	Mark Mowers	January 15, 1999	
First game	Karlis Skrastins	February 9, 1999	
First game	Matt Henderson	April 14, 1999	
First game	Petr Sykora	April 14, 1999	
First game	David Legwand	April 17, 1999	

== Transactions ==
This section will cover signings from May 4, 1998, until the end of the 1998–99 season.

=== Free agent signings ===
Nashville signed the following free agents between June and September 1998: Jayson More (June 4), Tom Fitzgerald (July 6), David Gosselin (July 9), Jeff Staples (July 16), Brad Smyth (July 16), Jamie Heward (Aug. 6), Andrew Brunette (Sept. 2), Vitali Yachmenev (Sept. 2), Sebastien Bordeleau (Sept. 3) and Sergei Krivokrasov (Sept. 11).

=== All season trades ===
Date	Traded	Acquired	Acquired From
May 29	future considerations	Marian Cisar	Los Angeles Kings
June 26	future considerations	Kimmo Timonen and Jan Vopat	Los Angeles Kings
June 26	future considerations	Darren Turcotte	St. Louis Blues
June 26	1998 5th round pick	Ville Peltonen	San Jose Sharks
June 26	future considerations	Sergei Krivokrasov	Chicago Blackhawks
June 26	future considerations	Jim Dowd	Calgary Flames
June 26	future considerations	Sebastien Bordeleau	Montreal Canadiens
June 26	1998 7th round pick	Dominic Roussel and Jeff Staples	Philadelphia Flyers
June 30	1999 7th round pick	Mike Sullivan	Phoenix Coyotes
July 7	future considerations	Vitali Yachmenev	Los Angeles Kings
July 9	future considerations	Tony Hrkac	Dallas Stars
July 14	Doug Brown	Petr Sykora, 1999 3rd round pick, and 1999 conditional pick	Detroit Red Wings
August 19	future considerations	Jeff Nelson	Washington Capitals
Oct 1	Jim Dowd and Mikhail Shtalenkov	Drake Berehowsky, Eric Fichaud and Greg de Vries	Edmonton Oilers
Oct 5	Dominic Roussel	Marc Moro and Chris Mason	Mighty Ducks of Anaheim
Oct 25	Greg de Vries	1999 3rd round draft pick	Colorado Avalanche
Oct 31	future considerations	Cliff Ronning and Richard Lintner	Phoenix Coyotes
Jan 13	J. J. Daigneault	future considerations	Phoenix Coyotes
Jan 26	future considerations	Sergei Klimentiev	Philadelphia Flyers
Mar 23	Blair Atcheynum	2000 6th round pick	St. Louis Blues
Apr 13	1999 4th round pick	Andy Berenzweig	New York Islanders
May 3	Brad Smyth	future considerations	New York Rangers

== Draft picks ==
=== Expansion draft ===
These results are numbered 1–26 for aesthetic purposes, but the players were not necessarily chosen in this order. As the Predators were the only team participating in the draft, the order is inconsequential.

#	Player	Drafted from
1.	Frederic Chabot (G)	Los Angeles Kings
2.	Mike Dunham (G)	New Jersey Devils
3.	Mike Richter (G)	New York Rangers
4.	Mikhail Shtalenkov (G)	Mighty Ducks of Anaheim
5.	Tomas Vokoun (G)	Montreal Canadiens
6.	Joel Bouchard (D)	Calgary Flames
7.	Bob Boughner (D)	Buffalo Sabres
8.	J. J. Daigneault (D)	New York Islanders
9.	Al Iafrate (D)	San Jose Sharks
10.	Uwe Krupp (D)	Colorado Avalanche
11.	John Slaney (D)	Phoenix Coyotes
12.	Rob Zettler (D)	Toronto Maple Leafs
13.	Chris Armstrong (D)	Florida Panthers
14.	Blair Atcheynum (RW)	St. Louis Blues
15.	Paul Brousseau (F)	Tampa Bay Lightning
16.	Doug Brown (RW)	Detroit Red Wings
17.	Andrew Brunette (LW)	Washington Capitals
18.	Patrick Cote (LW)	Dallas Stars
19.	Jeff Daniels (LW)	Carolina Hurricanes
20.	Craig Darby (C)	Philadelphia Flyers
21.	Doug Friedman (LW)	Edmonton Oilers
22.	Tony Hrkac (C)	Pittsburgh Penguins
23.	Greg Johnson (C)	Chicago Blackhawks
24.	Denny Lambert (LW)	Ottawa Senators
25.	Mike Sullivan (C)	Boston Bruins
26.	Scott Walker (RW)	Vancouver Canucks

=== Entry draft ===
Nashville's draft picks at the 1998 NHL entry draft held at the Marine Midland Arena in Buffalo, New York.

Round	#	Player	Position	Nationality	College/Junior/Club team
1	2	David Legwand	Center	United States	Plymouth Whalers (OHL)
3	60	Denis Arkhipov	Center	Russia	Ak Bars Kazan (Russia)
3	85	Geoff Koch	Left wing	United States	University of Michigan (Big Ten)
4	88	Kent Sauer	Defense	United States	North Iowa Huskies (USHL)
5	138	Martin Beauchesne	Defense	Canada	Sherbrooke Faucons (QMJHL)
6	147	Craig Brunel	Right wing	United States	Prince Albert Raiders (WHL)
8	202	Martin Bartek	Left wing	Slovakia	Sherbrooke Faucons (QMJHL)
9	230	Karlis Skrastins	Defense	Latvia	TPS (SM-liiga)
