= 1998–99 Colorado Avalanche season =

National Hockey League team season

1998–99 Colorado Avalanche
- Northwest Division champions
- Division: 1st Northwest
- Conference: 2nd Western
- 1998–99 record: 44–28–10
- Home record: 21–14–6
- Road record: 23–14–4
- Goals for: 239
- Goals against: 205

Team information
- General manager: Pierre Lacroix
- Coach: Bob Hartley
- Captain: Joe Sakic
- Arena: McNichols Sports Arena
- Average attendance: 16,059
- Minor league affiliate: Hershey Bears

Team leaders
- Goals: Joe Sakic (41)
- Assists: Peter Forsberg (67)
- Points: Peter Forsberg (97)
- Penalty minutes: Jeff Odgers (259)
- Plus/minus: Peter Forsberg (+27)
- Wins: Patrick Roy (32)
- Goals against average: Patrick Roy (2.29)

The 1998–99 Colorado Avalanche season was the Avalanche's fourth season and last season at McNichols Sports Arena. They would move to the Pepsi Center during the off-season.

== Regular season ==
- April 3, 1999: In a victory over the Edmonton Oilers, Patrick Roy passed Glenn Hall with his 408th victory.

=== Season standings ===
Northwest Division
R	CR		GP	W	L	T	GF	GA	PIM	Pts
1	2	**Colorado Avalanche**	82	44	28	10	239	205	1619	98
2	8	**Edmonton Oilers**	82	33	37	12	230	226	1373	78
3	9	Calgary Flames	82	30	40	12	211	234	1389	72
4	13	Vancouver Canucks	82	23	47	12	192	258	1764	58

Western Conference
R		Div	GP	W	L	T	GF	GA	Pts
**1**	**p – Dallas Stars**	**PAC**	**82**	**51**	**19**	**12**	**236**	**168**	**114**
**2**	**y – Colorado Avalanche**	**NW**	**82**	**44**	**28**	**10**	**239**	**205**	**98**
**3**	**y – Detroit Red Wings**	**CEN**	**82**	**43**	**32**	**7**	**245**	**202**	**93**
**4**	**Phoenix Coyotes**	**PAC**	**82**	**39**	**31**	**12**	**205**	**197**	**90**
**5**	**St. Louis Blues**	**CEN**	**82**	**37**	**32**	**13**	**237**	**209**	**87**
**6**	**Mighty Ducks of Anaheim**	**PAC**	**82**	**35**	**34**	**13**	**215**	**206**	**83**
**7**	**San Jose Sharks**	**PAC**	**82**	**31**	**33**	**18**	**196**	**191**	**80**
**8**	**Edmonton Oilers**	**NW**	**82**	**33**	**37**	**12**	**230**	**226**	**78**
9	Calgary Flames	NW	82	30	40	12	211	234	72
10	Chicago Blackhawks	CEN	82	29	41	12	202	248	70
11	Los Angeles Kings	PAC	82	32	45	5	189	222	69
12	Nashville Predators	CEN	82	28	47	7	190	261	63
13	Vancouver Canucks	NW	82	23	47	12	192	258	58

Divisions: CEN – Central, PAC – Pacific, NW – Northwest

bold – Qualified for playoffs; p – Won Presidents' Trophy; y – Won division

== Schedule and results ==
=== Regular season ===
1998–99 regular season
October: 2–6–1 (home: 2–4–0; road: 0–2–1)

Game	Date	Score	Opponent	Record	Recap
1	October 10, 1998	3–4	Ottawa Senators (1998–99)	0–1–0	L
2	October 12, 1998	0–3	Buffalo Sabres (1998–99)	0–2–0	L
3	October 14, 1998	0–3	Boston Bruins (1998–99)	0–3–0	L
4	October 15, 1998	2–5	@ Phoenix Coyotes (1998–99)	0–4–0	L
5	October 18, 1998	5–5 OT	@ Los Angeles Kings (1998–99)	0–4–1	T
6	October 24, 1998	6–4	Edmonton Oilers (1998–99)	1–4–1	W
7	October 26, 1998	1–5	Phoenix Coyotes (1998–99)	1–5–1	L
8	October 29, 1998	4–2	San Jose Sharks (1998–99)	2–5–1	W
9	October 31, 1998	2–3	@ Nashville Predators (1998–99)	2–6–1	L

November: 6–5–1 (home: 2–2–0; road: 4–3–1)

Game	Date	Score	Opponent	Record	Recap
10	November 2, 1998	3–2	@ Carolina Hurricanes (1998–99)	3–6–1	W
11	November 4, 1998	0–3	@ Toronto Maple Leafs (1998–99)	3–7–1	L
12	November 6, 1998	5–2	@ Edmonton Oilers (1998–99)	4–7–1	W
13	November 8, 1998	1–3	@ Calgary Flames (1998–99)	4–8–1	L
14	November 10, 1998	1–1 OT	@ Phoenix Coyotes (1998–99)	4–8–2	T
15	November 13, 1998	8–1	Tampa Bay Lightning (1998–99)	5–8–2	W
16	November 15, 1998	2–1	@ Vancouver Canucks (1998–99)	6–8–2	W
17	November 17, 1998	5–2	New York Islanders (1998–99)	7–8–2	W
18	November 19, 1998	0–5	Vancouver Canucks (1998–99)	7–9–2	L
19	November 21, 1998	3–2	@ Montreal Canadiens (1998–99)	8–9–2	W
20	November 25, 1998	0–3	@ Edmonton Oilers (1998–99)	8–10–2	L
21	November 28, 1998	2–3	New Jersey Devils (1998–99)	8–11–2	L

December: 8–6–1 (home: 2–3–1; road: 6–3–0)

Game	Date	Score	Opponent	Record	Recap
22	December 2, 1998	4–2	Detroit Red Wings (1998–99)	9–11–2	W
23	December 4, 1998	2–0	St. Louis Blues (1998–99)	10–11–2	W
24	December 5, 1998	3–1	@ St. Louis Blues (1998–99)	11–11–2	W
25	December 8, 1998	2–1	@ New York Islanders (1998–99)	12–11–2	W
26	December 9, 1998	2–1	@ New York Rangers (1998–99)	13–11–2	W
27	December 12, 1998	3–5	@ New Jersey Devils (1998–99)	13–12–2	L
28	December 14, 1998	0–0 OT	St. Louis Blues (1998–99)	13–12–3	T
29	December 17, 1998	1–2	@ Vancouver Canucks (1998–99)	13–13–3	L
30	December 19, 1998	1–2	@ San Jose Sharks (1998–99)	13–14–3	L
31	December 21, 1998	4–2	@ Mighty Ducks of Anaheim (1998–99)	14–14–3	W
32	December 22, 1998	0–1	Mighty Ducks of Anaheim (1998–99)	14–15–3	L
33	December 26, 1998	2–4	Dallas Stars (1998–99)	14–16–3	L
34	December 27, 1998	2–1	@ Calgary Flames (1998–99)	15–16–3	W
35	December 29, 1998	4–2	@ Vancouver Canucks (1998–99)	16–16–3	W
36	December 31, 1998	3–6	New York Rangers (1998–99)	16–17–3	L

January: 9–2–1 (home: 6–0–1; road: 3–2–0)

Game	Date	Score	Opponent	Record	Recap
37	January 2, 1999	2–4	@ Los Angeles Kings (1998–99)	16–18–3	L
38	January 4, 1999	4–3	Montreal Canadiens (1998–99)	17–18–3	W
39	January 6, 1999	2–2 OT	Florida Panthers (1998–99)	17–18–4	T
40	January 9, 1999	2–3	@ Detroit Red Wings (1998–99)	17–19–4	L
41	January 10, 1999	3–2 OT	@ Chicago Blackhawks (1998–99)	18–19–4	W
42	January 12, 1999	4–1	Chicago Blackhawks (1998–99)	19–19–4	W
43	January 16, 1999	2–0	St. Louis Blues (1998–99)	20–19–4	W
44	January 19, 1999	5–4	@ Los Angeles Kings (1998–99)	21–19–4	W
45	January 21, 1999	4–2	Calgary Flames (1998–99)	22–19–4	W
46	January 27, 1999	4–3	@ Mighty Ducks of Anaheim (1998–99)	23–19–4	W
47	January 28, 1999	6–2	Mighty Ducks of Anaheim (1998–99)	24–19–4	W
48	January 30, 1999	5–0	San Jose Sharks (1998–99)	25–19–4	W

February: 5–3–4 (home: 1–3–2; road: 4–0–2)

Game	Date	Score	Opponent	Record	Recap
49	February 2, 1999	3–2	@ Boston Bruins (1998–99)	26–19–4	W
50	February 3, 1999	5–3	@ Buffalo Sabres (1998–99)	27–19–4	W
51	February 5, 1999	3–1	@ Detroit Red Wings (1998–99)	28–19–4	W
52	February 7, 1999	3–0	@ Dallas Stars (1998–99)	29–19–4	W
53	February 9, 1999	1–2	Calgary Flames (1998–99)	29–20–4	L
54	February 13, 1999	1–4	Phoenix Coyotes (1998–99)	29–21–4	L
55	February 14, 1999	4–4 OT	Philadelphia Flyers (1998–99)	29–21–5	T
56	February 19, 1999	4–4 OT	@ Nashville Predators (1998–99)	29–21–6	T
57	February 21, 1999	1–1 OT	@ Dallas Stars (1998–99)	29–21–7	T
58	February 23, 1999	4–4 OT	Vancouver Canucks (1998–99)	29–21–8	T
59	February 25, 1999	2–3	Pittsburgh Penguins (1998–99)	29–22–8	L
60	February 27, 1999	3–1	Nashville Predators (1998–99)	30–22–8	W

March: 9–4–2 (home: 4–2–2; road: 5–2–0)

Game	Date	Score	Opponent	Record	Recap
61	March 1, 1999	3–4	Edmonton Oilers (1998–99)	30–23–8	L
62	March 3, 1999	7–5	@ Florida Panthers (1998–99)	31–23–8	W
63	March 4, 1999	1–2	@ Tampa Bay Lightning (1998–99)	31–24–8	L
64	March 7, 1999	3–1	@ Pittsburgh Penguins (1998–99)	32–24–8	W
65	March 9, 1999	3–2 OT	@ Washington Capitals (1998–99)	33–24–8	W
66	March 11, 1999	5–3	@ Philadelphia Flyers (1998–99)	34–24–8	W
67	March 14, 1999	1–3	Detroit Red Wings (1998–99)	34–25–8	L
68	March 18, 1999	3–2	Carolina Hurricanes (1998–99)	35–25–8	W
69	March 20, 1999	5–5 OT	Chicago Blackhawks (1998–99)	35–25–9	T
70	March 21, 1999	3–4	@ Chicago Blackhawks (1998–99)	35–26–9	L
71	March 24, 1999	5–2	Vancouver Canucks (1998–99)	36–26–9	W
72	March 26, 1999	3–1	Washington Capitals (1998–99)	37–26–9	W
73	March 28, 1999	7–2	Los Angeles Kings (1998–99)	38–26–9	W
74	March 30, 1999	3–3 OT	Calgary Flames (1998–99)	38–26–10	T
75	March 31, 1999	3–2	@ San Jose Sharks (1998–99)	39–26–10	W

April: 5–2–0 (home: 4–0–0; road: 1–2–0)

Game	Date	Score	Opponent	Record	Recap
76	April 3, 1999	5–2	Edmonton Oilers (1998–99)	40–26–10	W
77	April 5, 1999	4–1	Los Angeles Kings (1998–99)	41–26–10	W
78	April 7, 1999	4–1	Nashville Predators (1998–99)	42–26–10	W
79	April 11, 1999	4–2	@ St. Louis Blues (1998–99)	43–26–10	W
80	April 15, 1999	1–5	@ Calgary Flames (1998–99)	43–27–10	L
81	April 16, 1999	1–5	@ Edmonton Oilers (1998–99)	43–28–10	L
82	April 18, 1999	2–1	Dallas Stars (1998–99)	44–28–10	W

Legend: W Win (2 points) L Loss (0 points) T Tie (1 point)

=== Playoffs ===
1999 Stanley Cup playoffs
Western Conference Quarterfinals vs. (7) San Jose Sharks – Avalanche win 4–2

Game	Date	Score	Opponent	Series	Recap
1	April 24, 1999	3–1	San Jose Sharks	Avalanche lead 1–0	W
2	April 26, 1999	2–1 OT	San Jose Sharks	Avalanche lead 2–0	W
3	April 28, 1999	2–4	@ San Jose Sharks	Avalanche lead 2–1	L
4	April 30, 1999	3–7	@ San Jose Sharks	Series tied 2–2	L
5	May 1, 1999	6–2	San Jose Sharks	Avalanche lead 3–2	W
6	May 3, 1999	3–2 OT	@ San Jose Sharks	Avalanche win 4–2	W

Western Conference Semifinals vs. (3) Detroit Red Wings – Avalanche win 4–2

Game	Date	Score	Opponent	Series	Recap
1	May 7, 1999	2–3 OT	Detroit Red Wings	Red Wings lead 1–0	L
2	May 9, 1999	0–4	Detroit Red Wings	Red Wings lead 2–0	L
3	May 11, 1999	5–3	@ Detroit Red Wings	Red Wings lead 2–1	W
4	May 13, 1999	6–2	@ Detroit Red Wings	Series tied 2–2	W
5	May 16, 1999	3–0	Detroit Red Wings	Avalanche lead 3–2	W
6	May 18, 1999	5–2	@ Detroit Red Wings	Avalanche win 4–2	W

Western Conference Finals vs. (1) Dallas Stars – Stars win 4–3

Game	Date	Score	Opponent	Series	Recap
1	May 22, 1999	2–1	@ Dallas Stars	Avalanche lead 1–0	W
2	May 24, 1999	2–4	@ Dallas Stars	Series tied 1–1	L
3	May 26, 1999	0–3	Dallas Stars	Stars lead 2–1	L
4	May 28, 1999	3–2 OT	Dallas Stars	Series tied 2–2	W
5	May 30, 1999	7–5	@ Dallas Stars	Avalanche lead 3–2	W
6	June 1, 1999	1–4	Dallas Stars	Series tied 3–3	L
7	June 4, 1999	1–4	@ Dallas Stars	Stars win 4–3	L

Legend: W Win L Loss

== Player statistics ==
=== Scoring ===
- Position abbreviations: C = Center; D = Defense; G = Goaltender; LW = Left wing; RW = Right wing
- † = Joined team via a transaction (e.g., trade, waivers, signing) during the season. Stats reflect time with the Avalanche only.
- ‡ = Left team via a transaction (e.g., trade, waivers, release) during the season. Stats reflect time with the Avalanche only.

No.	Player	Pos	Regular season						Playoffs					
No.	Player	Pos	GP	G	A	Pts	+/-	PIM	GP	G	A	Pts	+/-	PIM
21	Peter Forsberg	C	78	30	67	97	27	108	19	8	16	24	7	31
19	Joe Sakic	C	73	41	55	96	23	29	19	6	13	19	−2	8
22	Claude Lemieux	RW	82	27	24	51	0	102	19	3	11	14	5	26
18	Adam Deadmarsh	RW	66	22	27	49	−2	99	19	8	4	12	2	20
23	Milan Hejduk	RW	82	14	34	48	8	26	16	6	6	12	3	4
37	Chris Drury	C	79	20	24	44	9	62	19	6	2	8	2	4
13	Valeri Kamensky	LW	65	14	30	44	1	28	10	4	5	9	5	4
8	Sandis Ozolinsh	D	39	7	25	32	10	22	19	4	8	12	−5	22
14	Theoren Fleury†	RW	15	10	14	24	8	18	18	5	12	17	−2	20
20	Rene Corbet‡	LW	53	8	14	22	3	58	—	—	—	—	—	—
52	Adam Foote	D	64	5	16	21	20	92	19	2	3	5	3	24
2	Sylvain Lefebvre	D	76	2	18	20	18	48	19	0	1	1	6	12
12	Shean Donovan	RW	68	7	12	19	4	37	5	0	0	0	0	2
3	Aaron Miller	D	76	5	13	18	3	42	19	1	5	6	8	10
26	Stephane Yelle	C	72	8	7	15	−8	40	10	0	1	1	−1	6
5	Alexei Gusarov	D	54	3	10	13	12	24	5	0	0	0	1	2
25	Shjon Podein†	LW	41	2	6	8	−3	24	19	1	1	2	−1	12
29	Eric Messier	LW	31	4	2	6	0	14	3	0	0	0	−1	0
32	Dale Hunter†	C	12	2	4	6	0	17	19	1	3	4	0	38
36	Jeff Odgers	RW	75	2	3	5	−3	259	15	1	0	1	0	14
11	Keith Jones‡	RW	12	2	2	4	−6	20	—	—	—	—	—	—
7	Greg de Vries†	D	67	1	3	4	−3	60	19	0	2	2	3	22
24	Jon Klemm	D	39	1	2	3	4	31	19	0	1	1	1	10
4	Cam Russell†	D	35	1	2	3	−5	84	—	—	—	—	—	—
17 (Note: Matte wore number 14 in his first five games.)	Christian Matte	RW	7	1	1	2	−2	0	—	—	—	—	—	—
33	Patrick Roy	G	61	0	2	2		28	19	0	2	2		4
16	Warren Rychel	LW	28	0	2	2	3	63	12	0	1	1	−1	14
15	Ted Crowley‡	D	7	0	1	1	−1	2	—	—	—	—	—	—
44	Serge Aubin†	LW	1	0	0	0	0	0	—	—	—	—	—	—
6	Wade Belak‡	D	22	0	0	0	−2	71	—	—	—	—	—	—
1	Craig Billington	G	21	0	0	0		2	1	0	0	0		0
32	Jeff Buchanan	D	6	0	0	0	1	6	—	—	—	—	—	—
30	Marc Denis	G	4	0	0	0		0	—	—	—	—	—	—
6	Chris Dingman†	LW	1	0	0	0	0	7	—	—	—	—	—	—
15	Mike Gaul†	D	1	0	0	0	0	0	—	—	—	—	—	—
28	Eric Lacroix‡	LW	7	0	0	0	−2	2	—	—	—	—	—	—
27	Scott Parker	RW	27	0	0	0	−3	71	—	—	—	—	—	—
43	Dan Smith	D	12	0	0	0	5	9	—	—	—	—	—	—
59	Brian White	D	2	0	0	0	0	0	—	—	—	—	—	—

=== Goaltending ===
No.	Player	Regular season										Playoffs								
No.	Player	GP	W	L	T	SA	GA	GAA	SV%	SO	TOI	GP	W	L	SA	GA	GAA	SV%	SO	TOI
33	Patrick Roy	61	32	19	8	1673	139	2.29	.917	5	3648	19	11	8	650	52	2.66	.920	1	1173
1	Craig Billington	21	11	8	1	492	52	2.87	.894	0	1086	1	0	0	6	1	6.67	.833	0	9
30	Marc Denis	4	1	1	1	110	9	2.49	.918	0	217	—	—	—	—	—	—	—	—	—

== Awards and records ==
=== Awards ===
Type	Award/honor	Recipient	Ref
League (annual)	Calder Memorial Trophy	Chris Drury	
League (annual)	NHL All-Rookie Team	Chris Drury (Forward)	
League (annual)	NHL All-Rookie Team	Milan Hejduk (Forward)	
League (annual)	NHL First All-Star Team	Peter Forsberg (Center)	
League (in-season)	NHL All-Star Game selection	Peter Forsberg (Note: Forsberg was voted to the starting lineup.)	
League (in-season)	NHL Player of the Month	Patrick Roy (January)	
League (in-season)	NHL Player of the Week	Joe Sakic (January 26)	
League (in-season)	NHL Player of the Week	Peter Forsberg (March 8)	
League (in-season)	NHL Player of the Week	Patrick Roy (March 29)	

=== Milestones ===
Milestone	Player	Date	Ref
First game	Chris Drury	October 10, 1998	
First game	Milan Hejduk	October 10, 1998	
First game	Dan Smith	October 12, 1998	
First game	Jeff Buchanan	November 6, 1998	
First game	Brian White	November 21, 1998	
First game	Scott Parker	November 28, 1998	
First game	Michael Gaul	December 19, 1998	
First game	Serge Aubin	December 31, 1998	
600th assist	Joe Sakic	April 3, 1999	

== Draft picks ==
Colorado's draft picks at the 1998 NHL entry draft held at the Marine Midland Arena in Buffalo, New York.

Round	#	Player	Nationality	College/Junior/Club team (League)
1	12	Alex Tanguay	Canada	Halifax Mooseheads (QMJHL)
1	17	Martin Skoula	Czech Republic	Barrie Colts (OHL)
1	19	Robyn Regehr	Canada	Kamloops Blazers (WHL)
1	20	Scott Parker	United States	Kelowna Rockets (WHL)
2	28	Ramzi Abid	Canada	Chicoutimi Saguenéens (QMJHL)
2	38	Philippe Sauve	United States	Rimouski Océanic (QMJHL)
2	53	Steve Moore	Canada	Harvard University (ECAC)
3	79	Yevgeni Lazarev	Russia	Kitchener Dutchmen (MWJHL)
5	141	K. C. Timmons	Canada	Tri-City Americans (WHL)
6	167	Alex Riazantsev	Russia	Victoriaville Tigres (QMJHL)

== See also ==
- 1998–99 NHL season

== Notes ==
Players wore a patch that read "CHS" to honor those lost during the Columbine High School shooting on 20 April, 1999.
