= 1998–99 Mighty Ducks of Anaheim season =

NHL team season

1998–99 Mighty Ducks of Anaheim
- Division: 3rd Pacific
- Conference: 6th Western
- 1998–99 record: 35–34–13
- Home record: 21–14–6
- Road record: 14–20–7
- Goals for: 215
- Goals against: 206

Team information
- General manager: Pierre Gauthier
- Coach: Craig Hartsburg
- Captain: Paul Kariya
- Alternate captains: Kevin Haller; Teemu Selanne
- Arena: Arrowhead Pond of Anaheim
- Average attendance: 15,804
- Minor league affiliates: Cincinnati Mighty Ducks; Huntington Blizzard

Team leaders
- Goals: Teemu Selanne (47)
- Assists: Paul Kariya (62)
- Points: Teemu Selanne (107)
- Penalty minutes: Stu Grimson (158)
- Plus/minus: Jamie Pushor (+20)
- Wins: Guy Hebert (31)
- Goals against average: Guy Hebert (2.42)

The 1998–99 Mighty Ducks of Anaheim season was the sixth season in franchise history.

== Off-season ==
The roster was shaken up a lot during the previous season and only a few changes took place in the summer. The Ducks traded Dave Karpa and a 2000 4th round pick to the Carolina Hurricanes for Kevin Haller and Stu Grimson on June 18. Two months later they acquired Jim Mckenzie for Jean-Francois Jomphe on August 11. They signed veteran Fredrik Olausson, who was with the Ducks before, to give the team scoring from the blue line, and Pascal Trepanier. Rookies Antti Aalto and Johan Davidsson made the roster while Mike Crowley who played very well last season would see more ice time with the parent team.

For the first time since the Ducks traded Ron Tugnutt to the Montreal Canadiens in 1994 the team saw just their second change in net, losing Mikhail Shtalenkov to the Nashville Predators in the 1998 NHL expansion draft. That left them with Prospects Patrick Lalime and Chris Mason for the back up position. Just before the season started the Ducks acquired Dominic Roussel from the Nashville Predators for Chris Mason and Marc Moro on October 5, 1998 which gave the team more experience in case Hebert would be sidelined like last season. Days later they sent Doug Houda to Detroit on October 9.

== Regular season ==
The season was much more consistent than the previous season. Anaheim started off slow, losing their first three games and scoring only one goal but was unbeaten the next six games. On October 27, 1998 they added Marty McInnis, a key player who gave them more scoring depth for the team's upcoming success and dominating Powerplay. On November 8 Tomas Sandstrom suffered a broken left wrist which kept him sidelined until late December thus relying more on their star players and hoping for others to fill the void. The team managed to comeback a few times after going winless some games and even put up an unbeaten streak like in early December (4-0-2) and a winning streak in early February (4–0–0). January turned out to be the very tough going 4–9–1 and winless (0-5-1) a second time since late November. Overall the Ducks were hovering around the .500 mark fighting to go to the post season.

In February the team pushed themselves into the playoffs as the Mighty Ducks went 13–3–1 from February 3 until March 10 including a team record seven-game winning streak. Anaheim stayed consistent after their streak, going 4–4–3, but registering a record of 1–5–1 in their last seven games, thus missing out on 5th place facing rather Phoenix than the Red Wings as they finished the season 6th in the west since the team was unable to maintain their amazing run in April. The Blues only lost one of their last nine games, whereas the Ducks only won one game out of their last seven, ironically against the Phoenix Coyotes,

During that seven-game winning streak the team only allowed 1 goal in each of those games, highlighting the great goaltending of Guy Hebert, who had a career year and his best season since 1996–97. Dominic Roussel also enjoyed a stellar comeback in the NHL as the team's backup. Both goalies provided excellent goaltending for the Mighty Ducks, each posting a save percentage above .920 as well as a superb GAA. Those great numbers were supported by their Defense as the team allowed 55 goals less than last year. Offensively the Ducks only scored 10 goals more than last season and relied very heavily on their first line (Kariya - Rucchin - Selanne) combining for 109 goals. Additional scoring was only provided by Marty McInnis (17 goals), defenceman Fredrik Olausson (16 goals) and Tomas Sandstrom (15 goals), who improved over last season but missed 24 games due to injury. Matt Cullen enjoyed a good second season, tallying 11 goals which was almost double than last year while Travis Green only scored 13 goals and 30 points which was below expectation. Rookies Anti Aaalto and Johan Davidson did not make an impact in the scoring department.

The Mighty Ducks finished the regular season with the most power-play goals, 83, and the best power-play percentage, 21.96% (83 for 378) in the NHL.

=== Final standings ===
Pacific Division
R	CR		GP	W	L	T	GF	GA	Pts
1	1	**Dallas Stars**	82	51	19	12	236	168	114
2	4	**Phoenix Coyotes**	82	39	31	12	205	197	90
3	6	**Mighty Ducks of Anaheim**	82	35	34	13	215	206	83
4	7	**San Jose Sharks**	82	31	33	18	196	191	80
5	11	Los Angeles Kings	82	32	45	5	189	222	69

Note: CR = Conference rank; GP = Games played; W = Wins; L = Losses; T = Ties; GF = Goals for; GA = Goals against; Pts = Points
Bolded teams qualified for the playoffs.

Western Conference
R		Div	GP	W	L	T	GF	GA	Pts
**1**	**p – Dallas Stars**	**PAC**	**82**	**51**	**19**	**12**	**236**	**168**	**114**
**2**	**y – Colorado Avalanche**	**NW**	**82**	**44**	**28**	**10**	**239**	**205**	**98**
**3**	**y – Detroit Red Wings**	**CEN**	**82**	**43**	**32**	**7**	**245**	**202**	**93**
**4**	**Phoenix Coyotes**	**PAC**	**82**	**39**	**31**	**12**	**205**	**197**	**90**
**5**	**St. Louis Blues**	**CEN**	**82**	**37**	**32**	**13**	**237**	**209**	**87**
**6**	**Mighty Ducks of Anaheim**	**PAC**	**82**	**35**	**34**	**13**	**215**	**206**	**83**
**7**	**San Jose Sharks**	**PAC**	**82**	**31**	**33**	**18**	**196**	**191**	**80**
**8**	**Edmonton Oilers**	**NW**	**82**	**33**	**37**	**12**	**230**	**226**	**78**
9	Calgary Flames	NW	82	30	40	12	211	234	72
10	Chicago Blackhawks	CEN	82	29	41	12	202	248	70
11	Los Angeles Kings	PAC	82	32	45	5	189	222	69
12	Nashville Predators	CEN	82	28	47	7	190	261	63
13	Vancouver Canucks	NW	82	23	47	12	192	258	58

Divisions: CEN – Central, PAC – Pacific, NW – Northwest

bold – Qualified for playoffs; p – Won Presidents' Trophy; y – Won division

== Playoffs ==
The Mighty Ducks met the Detroit Red Wings in the first round of the playoffs. The Wings swept the Mighty Ducks in four games.

Late in Game 3 Stu Grimson cross-checked Kris Draper in the face in front of the Red Wings bench which caused a brawl between both teams.

== Schedule and results ==
=== Regular season ===
1998–99 regular season
October: 3–3–3 (home: 2–0–1; road: 1–3–2)

Game	Date	Score	Opponent	Record	Recap
1	October 10, 1998	0–1	@ Washington Capitals (1998–99)	0–1–0	L
2	October 11, 1998	1–4	@ Philadelphia Flyers (1998–99)	0–2–0	L
3	October 13, 1998	0–1	@ Montreal Canadiens (1998–99)	0–3–0	L
4	October 15, 1998	5–3	@ Chicago Blackhawks (1998–99)	1–3–0	W
5	October 21, 1998	3–0	Boston Bruins (1998–99)	2–3–0	W
6	October 25, 1998	2–2 OT	Phoenix Coyotes (1998–99)	2–3–1	T
7	October 28, 1998	5–3	Tampa Bay Lightning (1998–99)	3–3–1	W
8	October 30, 1998	3–3 OT	@ Dallas Stars (1998–99)	3–3–2	T
9	October 31, 1998	2–2 OT	@ St. Louis Blues (1998–99)	3–3–3	T

November: 5–7–1 (home: 4–3–1; road: 1–4–0)

Game	Date	Score	Opponent	Record	Recap
10	November 4, 1998	1–3	St. Louis Blues (1998–99)	3–4–3	L
11	November 6, 1998	2–2 OT	San Jose Sharks (1998–99)	3–4–4	T
12	November 8, 1998	2–3	Detroit Red Wings (1998–99)	3–5–4	L
13	November 11, 1998	5–4 OT	Carolina Hurricanes (1998–99)	4–5–4	W
14	November 13, 1998	2–5	@ Vancouver Canucks (1998–99)	4–6–4	L
15	November 14, 1998	1–0	@ Calgary Flames (1998–99)	5–6–4	W
16	November 16, 1998	3–1	Los Angeles Kings (1998–99)	6–6–4	W
17	November 18, 1998	3–1	New York Rangers (1998–99)	7–6–4	W
18	November 20, 1998	2–3 OT	Edmonton Oilers (1998–99)	7–7–4	L
19	November 22, 1998	4–1	Chicago Blackhawks (1998–99)	8–7–4	W
20	November 25, 1998	2–5	@ Detroit Red Wings (1998–99)	8–8–4	L
21	November 27, 1998	1–3	@ Nashville Predators (1998–99)	8–9–4	L
22	November 29, 1998	1–3	@ Carolina Hurricanes (1998–99)	8–10–4	L

December: 5–3–4 (home: 3–1–2; road: 2–2–2)

Game	Date	Score	Opponent	Record	Recap
23	December 1, 1998	4–4 OT	@ Pittsburgh Penguins (1998–99)	8–10–5	T
24	December 3, 1998	1–4	@ Chicago Blackhawks (1998–99)	8–11–5	L
25	December 6, 1998	2–1	@ San Jose Sharks (1998–99)	9–11–5	W
26	December 9, 1998	4–4 OT	Vancouver Canucks (1998–99)	9–11–6	T
27	December 11, 1998	1–0	Washington Capitals (1998–99)	10–11–6	W
28	December 13, 1998	3–0	Los Angeles Kings (1998–99)	11–11–6	W
29	December 16, 1998	6–1	Nashville Predators (1998–99)	12–11–6	W
30	December 18, 1998	2–2 OT	New York Islanders (1998–99)	12–11–7	T
31	December 21, 1998	2–4	Colorado Avalanche (1998–99)	12–12–7	L
32	December 22, 1998	1–0	@ Colorado Avalanche (1998–99)	13–12–7	W
33	December 28, 1998	2–2 OT	@ Ottawa Senators (1998–99)	13–12–8	T
34	December 30, 1998	1–4	@ Toronto Maple Leafs (1998–99)	13–13–8	L

January: 4–9–1 (home: 3–5–0; road: 1–4–1)

Game	Date	Score	Opponent	Record	Recap
35	January 1, 1999	7–2	@ Buffalo Sabres (1998–99)	14–13–8	W
36	January 2, 1999	1–2	@ Boston Bruins (1998–99)	14–14–8	L
37	January 4, 1999	1–2	@ Nashville Predators (1998–99)	14–15–8	L
38	January 6, 1999	2–3 OT	Buffalo Sabres (1998–99)	14–16–8	L
39	January 8, 1999	4–1	Phoenix Coyotes (1998–99)	15–16–8	W
40	January 10, 1999	6–4	Edmonton Oilers (1998–99)	16–16–8	W
41	January 13, 1999	1–2	Calgary Flames (1998–99)	16–17–8	L
42	January 15, 1999	1–3	Dallas Stars (1998–99)	16–18–8	L
43	January 18, 1999	5–3	Pittsburgh Penguins (1998–99)	17–18–8	W
44	January 20, 1999	3–4	New Jersey Devils (1998–99)	17–19–8	L
45	January 21, 1999	3–3 OT	@ Phoenix Coyotes (1998–99)	17–19–9	T
46	January 27, 1999	3–4	Colorado Avalanche (1998–99)	17–20–9	L
47	January 28, 1999	2–6	@ Colorado Avalanche (1998–99)	17–21–9	L
48	January 30, 1999	0–1	@ Edmonton Oilers (1998–99)	17–22–9	L

February: 10–3–0 (home: 3–2–0; road: 7–1–0)

Game	Date	Score	Opponent	Record	Recap
49	February 3, 1999	3–0	Chicago Blackhawks (1998–99)	18–22–9	W
50	February 5, 1999	5–3	@ Tampa Bay Lightning (1998–99)	19–22–9	W
51	February 6, 1999	4–3	@ St. Louis Blues (1998–99)	20–22–9	W
52	February 10, 1999	5–4	Philadelphia Flyers (1998–99)	21–22–9	W
53	February 12, 1999	2–3	Dallas Stars (1998–99)	21–23–9	L
54	February 14, 1999	5–1	@ Phoenix Coyotes (1998–99)	22–23–9	W
55	February 15, 1999	3–1	@ Los Angeles Kings (1998–99)	23–23–9	W
56	February 17, 1999	2–6	Edmonton Oilers (1998–99)	23–24–9	L
57	February 19, 1999	3–6	@ Calgary Flames (1998–99)	23–25–9	L
58	February 20, 1999	5–1	@ Vancouver Canucks (1998–99)	24–25–9	W
59	February 24, 1999	2–1	@ Edmonton Oilers (1998–99)	25–25–9	W
60	February 26, 1999	3–1	San Jose Sharks (1998–99)	26–25–9	W
61	February 27, 1999	4–1	@ San Jose Sharks (1998–99)	27–25–9	W

March: 6–4–2 (home: 5–1–2; road: 1–3–0)

Game	Date	Score	Opponent	Record	Recap
62	March 3, 1999	2–1	Los Angeles Kings (1998–99)	28–25–9	W
63	March 5, 1999	3–2	Nashville Predators (1998–99)	29–25–9	W
64	March 7, 1999	3–1	Detroit Red Wings (1998–99)	30–25–9	W
65	March 10, 1999	4–4 OT	Vancouver Canucks (1998–99)	30–25–10	T
66	March 12, 1999	0–4	@ Dallas Stars (1998–99)	30–26–10	L
67	March 13, 1999	0–1	@ Phoenix Coyotes (1998–99)	30–27–10	L
68	March 17, 1999	2–2 OT	Ottawa Senators (1998–99)	30–27–11	T
69	March 18, 1999	4–2	@ Los Angeles Kings (1998–99)	31–27–11	W
70	March 21, 1999	2–5	Florida Panthers (1998–99)	31–28–11	L
71	March 26, 1999	5–1	Dallas Stars (1998–99)	32–28–11	W
72	March 28, 1999	5–1	Calgary Flames (1998–99)	33–28–11	W
73	March 31, 1999	1–7	@ New Jersey Devils (1998–99)	33–29–11	L

April: 2–5–2 (home: 1–2–0; road: 1–3–2)

Game	Date	Score	Opponent	Record	Recap
74	April 2, 1999	4–1	@ New York Rangers (1998–99)	34–29–11	W
75	April 3, 1999	2–2 OT	@ New York Islanders (1998–99)	34–29–12	T
76	April 5, 1999	2–3	@ Detroit Red Wings (1998–99)	34–30–12	L
77	April 7, 1999	1–5	@ Dallas Stars (1998–99)	34–31–12	L
78	April 9, 1999	1–4	San Jose Sharks (1998–99)	34–32–12	L
79	April 11, 1999	3–0	Phoenix Coyotes (1998–99)	35–32–12	W
80	April 14, 1999	1–3	St. Louis Blues (1998–99)	35–33–12	L
81	April 15, 1999	3–4 OT	@ Los Angeles Kings (1998–99)	35–34–12	L
82	April 17, 1999	3–3 OT	@ San Jose Sharks (1998–99)	35–34–13	T

Legend: W Win (2 points) L Loss (0 points) T Tie (1 point)

=== Playoffs ===
1999 Stanley Cup playoffs
Western Conference Quarterfinals: vs. (3) Detroit Red Wings — Red Wings win 4–0

Game	Date	Score	Opponent	Series	Recap
1	April 21, 1999	3–5	@ Detroit Red Wings	Red Wings lead 1–0	L
2	April 23, 1999	1–5	@ Detroit Red Wings	Red Wings lead 2–0	L
3	April 25, 1999	2–4	Detroit Red Wings	Red Wings lead 3–0	L
4	April 27, 1999	0–3	Detroit Red Wings	Red Wings win 4–0	L

Legend: W Win L Loss

== Player statistics ==
=== Scoring ===
- Position abbreviations: C = Center; D = Defense; G = Goaltender; LW = Left wing; RW = Right wing
- † = Joined team via a transaction (e.g., trade, waivers, signing) during the season. Stats reflect time with the Mighty Ducks only.
- ‡ = Left team via a transaction (e.g., trade, waivers, release) during the season. Stats reflect time with the Mighty Ducks only.

No.	Player	Pos	Regular season						Playoffs					
No.	Player	Pos	GP	G	A	Pts	+/-	PIM	GP	G	A	Pts	+/-	PIM
8	Teemu Selanne	RW	75	47	60	107	18	30	4	2	2	4	−1	2
9	Paul Kariya	LW	82	39	62	101	17	40	3	1	3	4	0	0
20	Steve Rucchin	C	69	23	39	62	11	22	4	0	3	3	0	0
2	Fredrik Olausson	D	74	16	40	56	17	30	4	0	2	2	−4	4
16	Marty McInnis†	C	75	18	34	52	−14	36	4	2	0	2	−1	2
17	Tomas Sandstrom	RW	58	15	17	32	−5	42	4	0	0	0	−2	4
39	Travis Green	C	79	13	17	30	−7	81	4	0	1	1	−4	4
11	Matt Cullen	C	75	11	14	25	−12	47	4	0	0	0	−2	0
24	Ruslan Salei	D	74	2	14	16	1	65	3	0	0	0	−4	4
18	Ted Drury	C	75	5	6	11	2	83	4	0	0	0	−6	0
33	Jim McKenzie	LW	73	5	4	9	−18	99	4	0	0	0	−2	4
19	Jeff Nielsen	RW	80	5	4	9	−12	34	4	0	0	0	−6	2
14	Antti Aalto	C	73	3	5	8	−12	24	4	0	0	0	0	2
22	Johan Davidsson	C	64	3	5	8	−9	14	1	0	0	0	0	0
23	Jason Marshall	D	72	1	7	8	−5	142	4	1	0	1	−1	10
5	Kevin Haller	D	82	1	6	7	−1	122	4	0	0	0	−1	2
27	Pascal Trepanier	D	45	2	4	6	0	48	—	—	—	—	—	—
25	Mike Crowley	D	20	2	3	5	−10	16	—	—	—	—	—	—
7	Pavel Trnka	D	63	0	4	4	−6	60	4	0	1	1	−3	2
32	Stu Grimson	LW	73	3	0	3	0	158	3	0	0	0	0	30
4	Jamie Pushor	D	70	1	2	3	−20	112	4	0	0	0	−3	6
21	Scott Ferguson	D	2	0	1	1	0	0	—	—	—	—	—	—
31	Guy Hebert	G	69	0	1	1		0	4	0	0	0		0
10	Josef Marha‡	C	10	0	1	1	−4	0	—	—	—	—	—	—
12	Mike Leclerc	LW	7	0	0	0	−2	4	1	0	0	0	0	0
30	Dominic Roussel	G	18	0	0	0		0	—	—	—	—	—	—
34	Dan Trebil	D	6	0	0	0	−2	0	1	0	0	0	0	2
35	Tom Askey	G	—	—	—	—	—	—	1	0	0	0		0

=== Goaltending ===
No.	Player	Regular season										Playoffs								
No.	Player	GP	W	L	T	SA	GA	GAA	SV%	SO	TOI	GP	W	L	SA	GA	GAA	SV%	SO	TOI
31	Guy Hebert	69	31	29	9	2114	165	2.46	.922	6	4083	4	0	3	124	15	4.33	.879	0	208
30	Dominic Roussel	18	4	5	4	478	37	2.51	.923	1	884	—	—	—	—	—	—	—	—	—
35	Tom Askey	—	—	—	—	—	—	—	—	—	—	1	0	1	11	2	3.99	.818	0	30

== Awards and records ==
=== Awards ===
Type	Award/honor	Recipient	Ref
League (annual)	Maurice "Rocket" Richard Trophy	Teemu Selanne	
League (annual)	NHL First All-Star Team	Paul Kariya (Left wing)	
League (annual)	NHL Second All-Star Team	Teemu Selanne (Right wing)	
League (in-season)	NHL All-Star Game selection	Paul Kariya (Note: Kariya and Selanne were voted to the starting lineup.)	
League (in-season)	NHL All-Star Game selection	Teemu Selanne	
League (in-season)	NHL Player of the Month	Teemu Selanne (February)	
League (in-season)	NHL Player of the Week	Paul Kariya (November 23)	
League (in-season)	NHL Player of the Week	Teemu Selanne (March 1)	

=== Milestones ===
Milestone	Player	Date	Ref
First game	Johan Davidsson	October 10, 1998	

== Transactions ==
Acquired Marty McInnis from the Chicago Blackhawks ( previously acquired from the Calgary Flames ) for a 4th round draft pick on October 27, 1998

Traded Drew Bannister to the Tampa Bay Lightning for a 2000 5th round pick on December 10, 1998

Traded Josef Marha to the Chicago Blackhawks for future considerations (became a 1999 4th round draft) on January 28, 1999

== Draft picks ==
Anaheim's draft picks at the 1998 NHL entry draft held at the Marine Midland Arena in Buffalo, New York.

Round	#	Player	Nationality	College/Junior/Club team (League)
1	5	Vitaly Vishnevskiy	Russia	Torpedo Yaroslavl (Russia)
2	32	Stephen Peat	Canada	Red Deer Rebels (WHL)
4	112	Viktor Wallin	Sweden	HV71 (Sweden)
6	150	Trent Hunter	Canada	Prince George Cougars (WHL)
7	178	Jesse Fibiger	Canada	University of Minnesota Duluth (WCHA)
8	205	David Bernier	Canada	Quebec Remparts (QMJHL)
9	233	Pelle Prestberg	Sweden	Farjestad BK (Sweden)
9	245	Andreas Andersson	Sweden	HV71 (Sweden)

== Farm teams ==
Cincinnati Mighty Ducks

== See also ==
- 1998–99 NHL season
