= 1998–99 Dallas Stars season =

Sixth Dallas Stars season

1998–99 Dallas Stars
- Stanley Cup champions
- Presidents' Trophy winners
- Western Conference champions
- Pacific Division champions
- Division: 1st Pacific
- Conference: 1st Western
- 1998–99 record: 51–19–12
- Home record: 29–8–4
- Road record: 22–11–8
- Goals for: 236
- Goals against: 168

Team information
- General manager: Bob Gainey
- Coach: Ken Hitchcock
- Captain: Derian Hatcher
- Alternate captains: Craig Ludwig; Mike Modano; Joe Nieuwendyk; Sergei Zubov
- Arena: Reunion Arena
- Average attendance: 16,907
- Minor league affiliates: Michigan K-Wings; Dayton Bombers

Team leaders
- Goals: Mike Modano (34)
- Assists: Mike Modano (47)
- Points: Mike Modano (81)
- Penalty minutes: Pat Verbeek (133)
- Plus/minus: Mike Modano (+29); Jere Lehtinen (+29)
- Wins: Ed Belfour (35)
- Goals against average: Ed Belfour (1.99)

The 1998–99 Dallas Stars season was the Stars' sixth season in Dallas, Texas, and the thirty-second of the franchise. They would defeat the Buffalo Sabres in the Stanley Cup finals to win the first Stanley Cup for the Stars in franchise history.

== Offseason ==
Under a league-wide realignment from four to six divisions, the NHL moved the Stars from the Central to the Pacific Division. This resulted in the oddity of Dallas, a city near the longitudinal center of the contiguous United States and in the Central Time Zone, having none of its major professional sports teams in a "Central Division" despite the fact that all of the then-established major leagues at this time had divisions with some form of that name. This would temporarily change when the Dallas Burn of the then-new Major League Soccer were placed in a newly-formed Central Division in 2000, but MLS reverted to an Eastern and Western Conference format without additional divisions after only two seasons. The Stars would eventually return to the Central Division after the NHL returned to a four division alignment in 2013.

== Regular season ==
The Stars finished the regular season with the NHL's best record and first overall in goals against, with just 168. They also tied the St. Louis Blues and San Jose Sharks for fewest short-handed goals allowed, with 4.

=== Season standings ===
Pacific Division
R	CR		GP	W	L	T	GF	GA	Pts
1	1	**Dallas Stars**	82	51	19	12	236	168	114
2	4	**Phoenix Coyotes**	82	39	31	12	205	197	90
3	6	**Mighty Ducks of Anaheim**	82	35	34	13	215	206	83
4	7	**San Jose Sharks**	82	31	33	18	196	191	80
5	11	Los Angeles Kings	82	32	45	5	189	222	69

Note: CR = Conference rank; GP = Games played; W = Wins; L = Losses; T = Ties; GF = Goals for; GA = Goals against; Pts = Points
Bolded teams qualified for the playoffs.

Western Conference
R		Div	GP	W	L	T	GF	GA	Pts
**1**	**p – Dallas Stars**	**PAC**	**82**	**51**	**19**	**12**	**236**	**168**	**114**
**2**	**y – Colorado Avalanche**	**NW**	**82**	**44**	**28**	**10**	**239**	**205**	**98**
**3**	**y – Detroit Red Wings**	**CEN**	**82**	**43**	**32**	**7**	**245**	**202**	**93**
**4**	**Phoenix Coyotes**	**PAC**	**82**	**39**	**31**	**12**	**205**	**197**	**90**
**5**	**St. Louis Blues**	**CEN**	**82**	**37**	**32**	**13**	**237**	**209**	**87**
**6**	**Mighty Ducks of Anaheim**	**PAC**	**82**	**35**	**34**	**13**	**215**	**206**	**83**
**7**	**San Jose Sharks**	**PAC**	**82**	**31**	**33**	**18**	**196**	**191**	**80**
**8**	**Edmonton Oilers**	**NW**	**82**	**33**	**37**	**12**	**230**	**226**	**78**
9	Calgary Flames	NW	82	30	40	12	211	234	72
10	Chicago Blackhawks	CEN	82	29	41	12	202	248	70
11	Los Angeles Kings	PAC	82	32	45	5	189	222	69
12	Nashville Predators	CEN	82	28	47	7	190	261	63
13	Vancouver Canucks	NW	82	23	47	12	192	258	58

Divisions: CEN – Central, PAC – Pacific, NW – Northwest

bold – Qualified for playoffs; p – Won Presidents' Trophy; y – Won division

== Schedule and results ==
=== Regular season ===
1998–99 regular season
October: 6–1–2 (home: 6–0–1; road: 0–1–1)

Game	Date	Score	Opponent	Record	Recap
1	October 10, 1998	4–1	Buffalo Sabres (1998–99)	1–0–0	W
2	October 13, 1998	3–1	Chicago Blackhawks (1998–99)	2–0–0	W
3	October 15, 1998	2–2 OT	@ Carolina Hurricanes (1998–99)	2–0–1	T
4	October 17, 1998	3–4	@ Chicago Blackhawks (1998–99)	2–1–1	L
5	October 20, 1998	3–1	Calgary Flames (1998–99)	3–1–1	W
6	October 22, 1998	2–1	Phoenix Coyotes (1998–99)	4–1–1	W
7	October 24, 1998	2–1	San Jose Sharks (1998–99)	5–1–1	W
8	October 30, 1998	3–3 OT	Mighty Ducks of Anaheim (1998–99)	5–1–2	T
9	October 31, 1998	3–2	Detroit Red Wings (1998–99)	6–1–2	W

November: 6–3–1 (home: 3–2–0; road: 3–1–1)

Game	Date	Score	Opponent	Record	Recap
10	November 4, 1998	0–4	@ San Jose Sharks (1998–99)	6–2–2	L
11	November 7, 1998	4–3	@ Los Angeles Kings (1998–99)	7–2–2	W
12	November 11, 1998	0–2	Phoenix Coyotes (1998–99)	7–3–2	L
13	November 13, 1998	5–1	@ Detroit Red Wings (1998–99)	8–3–2	W
14	November 14, 1998	3–1	@ Boston Bruins (1998–99)	9–3–2	W
15	November 20, 1998	4–2	New York Islanders (1998–99)	10–3–2	W
16	November 21, 1998	3–3 OT	@ St. Louis Blues (1998–99)	10–3–3	T
17	November 23, 1998	3–2	San Jose Sharks (1998–99)	11–3–3	W
18	November 25, 1998	2–5	New Jersey Devils (1998–99)	11–4–3	L
19	November 27, 1998	4–0	Washington Capitals (1998–99)	12–4–3	W

December: 11–1–3 (home: 4–0–1; road: 7–1–2)

Game	Date	Score	Opponent	Record	Recap
20	December 2, 1998	3–0	@ San Jose Sharks (1998–99)	13–4–3	W
21	December 4, 1998	1–4	@ Vancouver Canucks (1998–99)	13–5–3	L
22	December 6, 1998	6–2	@ Edmonton Oilers (1998–99)	14–5–3	W
23	December 7, 1998	3–2	@ Calgary Flames (1998–99)	15–5–3	W
24	December 9, 1998	3–3 OT	San Jose Sharks (1998–99)	15–5–4	T
25	December 11, 1998	3–2	Montreal Canadiens (1998–99)	16–5–4	W
26	December 13, 1998	2–2 OT	@ Chicago Blackhawks (1998–99)	16–5–5	T
27	December 15, 1998	7–3	St. Louis Blues (1998–99)	17–5–5	W
28	December 18, 1998	3–1	@ Detroit Red Wings (1998–99)	18–5–5	W
29	December 20, 1998	3–2	@ Ottawa Senators (1998–99)	19–5–5	W
30	December 21, 1998	2–2 OT	@ Montreal Canadiens (1998–99)	19–5–6	T
31	December 23, 1998	5–1	@ Toronto Maple Leafs (1998–99)	20–5–6	W
32	December 26, 1998	4–2	@ Colorado Avalanche (1998–99)	21–5–6	W
33	December 28, 1998	1–0	Nashville Predators (1998–99)	22–5–6	W
34	December 31, 1998	6–1	Boston Bruins (1998–99)	23–5–6	W

January: 7–4–1 (home: 2–2–0; road: 5–2–1)

Game	Date	Score	Opponent	Record	Recap
35	January 1, 1999	2–1 OT	@ Phoenix Coyotes (1998–99)	24–5–6	W
36	January 6, 1999	6–4	Vancouver Canucks (1998–99)	25–5–6	W
37	January 8, 1999	0–1	@ Calgary Flames (1998–99)	25–6–6	L
38	January 10, 1999	0–2	@ Vancouver Canucks (1998–99)	25–7–6	L
39	January 12, 1999	2–2 OT	@ Edmonton Oilers (1998–99)	25–7–7	T
40	January 13, 1999	2–1	@ San Jose Sharks (1998–99)	26–7–7	W
41	January 15, 1999	3–1	@ Mighty Ducks of Anaheim (1998–99)	27–7–7	W
42	January 18, 1999	3–5	Vancouver Canucks (1998–99)	27–8–7	L
43	January 20, 1999	4–6	Toronto Maple Leafs (1998–99)	27–9–7	L
44	January 27, 1999	3–2	Los Angeles Kings (1998–99)	28–9–7	W
45	January 29, 1999	4–1	@ Tampa Bay Lightning (1998–99)	29–9–7	W
46	January 30, 1999	5–2	@ Florida Panthers (1998–99)	30–9–7	W

February: 8–2–2 (home: 5–2–2; road: 3–0–0)

Game	Date	Score	Opponent	Record	Recap
47	February 1, 1999	2–2 OT	Calgary Flames (1998–99)	30–9–8	T
48	February 7, 1999	0–3	Colorado Avalanche (1998–99)	30–10–8	L
49	February 12, 1999	3–2	@ Mighty Ducks of Anaheim (1998–99)	31–10–8	W
50	February 13, 1999	3–2	@ Los Angeles Kings (1998–99)	32–10–8	W
51	February 15, 1999	4–1	Edmonton Oilers (1998–99)	33–10–8	W
52	February 17, 1999	2–1	Florida Panthers (1998–99)	34–10–8	W
53	February 19, 1999	5–1	Chicago Blackhawks (1998–99)	35–10–8	W
54	February 21, 1999	1–1 OT	Colorado Avalanche (1998–99)	35–10–9	T
55	February 23, 1999	4–3	@ Nashville Predators (1998–99)	36–10–9	W
56	February 24, 1999	1–2	Nashville Predators (1998–99)	36–11–9	L
57	February 26, 1999	6–4	Pittsburgh Penguins (1998–99)	37–11–9	W
58	February 28, 1999	1–0	Los Angeles Kings (1998–99)	38–11–9	W

March: 9–4–3 (home: 5–1–0; road: 4–3–3)

Game	Date	Score	Opponent	Record	Recap
59	March 2, 1999	2–2 OT	@ New York Rangers (1998–99)	38–11–10	T
60	March 4, 1999	3–2 OT	@ New York Islanders (1998–99)	39–11–10	W
61	March 5, 1999	1–2	@ Buffalo Sabres (1998–99)	39–12–10	L
62	March 7, 1999	4–3	St. Louis Blues (1998–99)	40–12–10	W
63	March 10, 1999	7–4	Edmonton Oilers (1998–99)	41–12–10	W
64	March 12, 1999	4–0	Mighty Ducks of Anaheim (1998–99)	42–12–10	W
65	March 14, 1999	1–1 OT	@ Philadelphia Flyers (1998–99)	42–12–11	T
66	March 16, 1999	2–2 OT	@ Pittsburgh Penguins (1998–99)	42–12–12	T
67	March 17, 1999	1–2 OT	@ Washington Capitals (1998–99)	42–13–12	L
68	March 19, 1999	1–2	Ottawa Senators (1998–99)	42–14–12	L
69	March 21, 1999	3–2 OT	Carolina Hurricanes (1998–99)	43–14–12	W
70	March 23, 1999	3–2	@ Phoenix Coyotes (1998–99)	44–14–12	W
71	March 25, 1999	2–1	@ Los Angeles Kings (1998–99)	45–14–12	W
72	March 26, 1999	1–5	@ Mighty Ducks of Anaheim (1998–99)	45–15–12	L
73	March 28, 1999	3–0	@ Nashville Predators (1998–99)	46–15–12	W
74	March 31, 1999	6–4	Tampa Bay Lightning (1998–99)	47–15–12	W

April: 4–4–0 (home: 4–1–0; road: 0–3–0)

Game	Date	Score	Opponent	Record	Recap
75	April 3, 1999	2–5	@ St. Louis Blues (1998–99)	47–16–12	L
76	April 4, 1999	0–3	Detroit Red Wings (1998–99)	47–17–12	L
77	April 7, 1999	5–1	Mighty Ducks of Anaheim (1998–99)	48–17–12	W
78	April 9, 1999	3–1	New York Rangers (1998–99)	49–17–12	W
79	April 11, 1999	6–2	Los Angeles Kings (1998–99)	50–17–12	W
80	April 14, 1999	4–2	Phoenix Coyotes (1998–99)	51–17–12	W
81	April 17, 1999	0–2	@ Phoenix Coyotes (1998–99)	51–18–12	L
82	April 18, 1999	1–2	@ Colorado Avalanche (1998–99)	51–19–12	L

Legend: W Win (2 points) L Loss (0 points) T Tie (1 point)

=== Playoffs ===
1999 Stanley Cup playoffs
Western Conference Quarterfinals vs. (8) Edmonton Oilers: Stars win 4–0

Game	Date	Score	Opponent	Series	Recap
1	April 21, 1999	2–1	Edmonton Oilers	Stars lead 1–0	W
2	April 23, 1999	3–2	Edmonton Oilers	Stars lead 2–0	W
3	April 25, 1999	3–2	@ Edmonton Oilers	Stars lead 3–0	W
4	April 27, 1999	3–2 3OT	@ Edmonton Oilers	Stars win 4–0	W

Western Conference Semifinals vs. (5) St. Louis Blues: Stars win 4–2

Game	Date	Score	Opponent	Series	Recap
1	May 6, 1999	3–0	St. Louis Blues	Stars lead 1–0	W
2	May 8, 1999	5–4 OT	St. Louis Blues	Stars lead 2–0	W
3	May 10, 1999	2–3 OT	@ St. Louis Blues	Stars lead 2–1	L
4	May 12, 1999	2–3 OT	@ St. Louis Blues	Series tied 2–2	L
5	May 15, 1999	3–1	St. Louis Blues	Stars lead 3–2	W
6	May 17, 1999	2–1 OT	@ St. Louis Blues	Stars win 4–2	W

Western Conference Finals vs. (2) Colorado Avalanche – Stars win 4–3

Game	Date	Score	Opponent	Series	Recap
1	May 22, 1999	1–2	Colorado Avalanche	Avalanche lead 1–0	L
2	May 24, 1999	4–2	Colorado Avalanche	Series tied 1–1	W
3	May 26, 1999	3–0	@ Colorado Avalanche	Stars lead 2–1	W
4	May 28, 1999	2–3 OT	@ Colorado Avalanche	Series tied 2–2	L
5	May 30, 1999	5–7	Colorado Avalanche	Avalanche lead 3–2	L
6	June 1, 1999	4–1	@ Colorado Avalanche	Series tied 3–3	W
7	June 4, 1999	4–1	Colorado Avalanche	Stars win 4–3	W

Stanley Cup Finals vs. (E7) Buffalo Sabres – Stars win 4–2

Game	Date	Score	Opponent	Series	Recap
1	June 8, 1999	2–3 OT	Buffalo Sabres	Sabres lead 1–0	L
2	June 10, 1999	4–2	Buffalo Sabres	Series tied 1–1	W
3	June 12, 1999	2–1	@ Buffalo Sabres	Stars lead 2–1	W
4	June 15, 1999	1–2	@ Buffalo Sabres	Series tied 2–2	L
5	June 17, 1999	2–0	Buffalo Sabres	Stars lead 3–2	W
6	June 19, 1999	2–1 3OT	@ Buffalo Sabres	Stars win 4–2	W

Legend: W Win L Loss

== Player statistics ==
=== Scoring ===
- Position abbreviations: C = Center; D = Defense; G = Goaltender; LW = Left wing; RW = Right wing
- † = Joined team via a transaction (e.g., trade, waivers, signing) during the season. Stats reflect time with the Stars only.
- ‡ = Left team via a transaction (e.g., trade, waivers, release) during the season. Stats reflect time with the Stars only.

No.	Player	Pos	Regular season						Playoffs					
No.	Player	Pos	GP	G	A	Pts	+/-	PIM	GP	G	A	Pts	+/-	PIM
9	Mike Modano	C	77	34	47	81	29	44	23	5	18	23	6	16
22	Brett Hull	RW	60	32	26	58	19	30	22	8	7	15	3	4
25	Joe Nieuwendyk	C	67	28	27	55	11	34	23	11	10	21	7	19
26	Jere Lehtinen	RW	74	20	32	52	29	18	23	10	3	13	8	2
56	Sergei Zubov	D	81	10	41	51	9	20	23	1	12	13	13	4
5	Darryl Sydor	D	74	14	34	48	−1	50	23	3	9	12	8	16
15	Jamie Langenbrunner	RW	75	12	33	45	10	62	23	10	7	17	7	16
16	Pat Verbeek	RW	78	17	17	34	11	133	18	3	4	7	4	14
29	Grant Marshall	RW	82	13	18	31	1	85	14	0	3	3	1	20
2	Derian Hatcher	D	80	9	21	30	21	102	18	1	6	7	4	24
12	Mike Keane	RW	81	6	23	29	−2	62	23	5	2	7	−1	6
41	Tony Hrkac	C	69	13	14	27	2	26	5	0	2	2	3	4
14	Dave Reid	LW	73	6	11	17	0	16	23	2	8	10	4	14
21	Guy Carbonneau	C	74	4	12	16	−3	31	17	2	4	6	0	6
24	Richard Matvichuk	D	64	3	9	12	23	51	22	1	5	6	4	20
27	Shawn Chambers	D	61	2	9	11	6	18	17	0	2	2	−1	18
3	Craig Ludwig	D	80	2	6	8	5	87	23	1	4	5	2	20
10	Brian Skrudland	C	40	4	1	5	2	33	19	0	2	2	0	16
18	Derek Plante†	C	10	2	3	5	1	4	6	1	0	1	0	4
4	Sergei Gusev‡	D	22	1	4	5	5	6	—	—	—	—	—	—
33	Benoit Hogue†	C	12	1	3	4	2	4	14	0	2	2	−1	16
37	Brad Lukowich	D	14	1	2	3	3	19	8	0	1	1	3	4
17	Brent Severyn	LW	30	1	2	3	−2	50	—	—	—	—	—	—
49	Jon Sim	LW	7	1	0	1	1	12	4	0	0	0	−1	0
6	Dan Keczmer‡	D	22	0	1	1	−2	22	—	—	—	—	—	—
20	Ed Belfour	G	61	0	0	0		26	23	0	0	0		4
28	Jason Botterill	LW	17	0	0	0	−2	23	—	—	—	—	—	—
34	Petr Buzek	D	2	0	0	0	0	2	—	—	—	—	—	—
39	Kelly Fairchild	C	1	0	0	0	0	0	—	—	—	—	—	—
30	Manny Fernandez	G	1	0	0	0		0	—	—	—	—	—	—
23	Aaron Gavey	C	7	0	0	0	−1	10	—	—	—	—	—	—
6 (Note: Lidster wore number 33 in his first six games.)	Doug Lidster†	D	17	0	0	0	0	10	4	0	0	0	0	2
11	Blake Sloan†	RW	14	0	0	0	−1	10	19	0	2	2	−1	8
1	Roman Turek	G	26	0	0	0		0	—	—	—	—	—	—
46	Jamie Wright	LW	11	0	0	0	−3	0	—	—	—	—	—	—

=== Goaltending ===
No.	Player	Regular season										Playoffs								
No.	Player	GP	W	L	T	SA	GA	GAA	SV%	SO	TOI	GP	W	L	SA	GA	GAA	SV%	SO	TOI
20	Ed Belfour	61	35	15	9	1373	117	1.99	.915	5	3536	23	16	7	617	43	1.67	.930	3	1544
1	Roman Turek	26	16	3	3	562	48	2.08	.915	1	1382	—	—	—	—	—	—	—	—	—
30	Manny Fernandez	1	0	1	0	29	2	2.00	.931	0	60	—	—	—	—	—	—	—	—	—

== Awards and records ==
=== Awards ===
Type	Award/honor	Recipient	Ref
League (annual)	Conn Smythe Trophy	Joe Nieuwendyk	
League (annual)	Frank J. Selke Trophy	Jere Lehtinen	
League (annual)	William M. Jennings Trophy	Ed Belfour	
League (annual)	William M. Jennings Trophy	Roman Turek	
League (in-season)	NHL All-Star Game selection	Ed Belfour	
League (in-season)	NHL All-Star Game selection	Ken Hitchcock (coach)	
League (in-season)	NHL All-Star Game selection	Mike Modano	
League (in-season)	NHL All-Star Game selection	Darryl Sydor	
League (in-season)	NHL All-Star Game selection	Sergei Zubov	
League (in-season)	NHL Player of the Week	Mike Modano (December 28)	
Team	Star of the Game Award	Mike Modano	

=== Milestones ===
Milestone	Player	Date	Ref
400th goal scored	Joe Nieuwendyk	October 30, 1998	
500th game played	Ed Belfour	November 13, 1998	
1,000th point	Brett Hull	November 14, 1998	
First game	Blake Sloan	March 12, 1999	
First game	Jon Sim	March 28, 1999	

== Transactions ==
- February 26, 1999 – Doug Lidster was signed as a free agent with the Dallas Stars.

== Dallas Stars - 1999 Stanley Cup champions ==
=== Players ===
Centres

- 9 Mike Modano (A. Capt.)
- 10 Brian Skrudland
- 18 Derek Plante††
- 21 Guy Carbonneau
- 25 Joe Nieuwendyk (A. Capt.)
- 49 Jon Sim

Wingers

- 11 Blake Sloan
- 12 Mike Keane
- 14 Dave Reid
- 15 Jamie Langenbrunner
- 16 Pat Verbeek
- 17 Brent Severyn††
- 22 Brett Hull
- 26 Jere Lehtinen
- 29 Grant Marshall
- 33 Benoit Hogue
- 41 Tony Hrkac

Defencemen

- 2 Derian Hatcher (Captain)
- 3 Craig Ludwig (A. Capt.)
- 5 Darryl Sydor
- 24 Richard Matvichuk
- 56 Sergei Zubov (A. Capt.)
- 27 Shawn Chambers
- 6 Doug Lidster (D)†
- 37 Brad Lukowich (D)†

Goaltenders

- 20 Ed Belfour
- 1 Roman Turek

=== Coaching and administrative staff ===
- Thomas O. Hicks (Chairman/Owner/Governor), Jim Lites (President), Bob Gainey (Vice President/General Manager)
- Doug Armstrong (Ass't General Manager), Craig Button (Director of Player Personnel), Ken Hitchcock (Head Coach)
- Doug Jarvis, Rick Wilson (Ass't Coaches), Rick McLaughlin, Jeff Cogen (Vice Presidents)
- Bill Strong (Vice President), Tim Bernhardt (Director-Amateur Scouting), Doug Overton (Director-Pro Scouting)
- Bob Gernader (Chief Scout), Stu McGregor (Western Scout), Dave Suprenant (Medical Trainer), Dave Smith (Equipment Manager),
- Rick Matthews (Ass't Equipment Manager), Jean-Jacque McQueen (Strength-Conditioning Coach),
- Rick St. Croix (Goaltending Consultant), Dan Stuchal (Director of Team Services), Larry Kelly (Director of Public Relations),
- Leon Friedrich† (Video Coordinator), Craig Lowery† (Trainer Ass't), Dave Warner† (Equipment Ass't).

=== Stanley Cup engraving ===
- ††Brent Severyn played only 30 games, missing 22 regular season games due to injuries, and was a healthy scratch for the playoffs. Dallas included him on the Stanley Cup because he spent the whole season with Dallas. Derek Plante played 41 regular season games for Buffalo and 10 for Dallas. He also played 6 playoff games. His name was included on the cup because he spent the whole season in the NHL.
- † Members were included on the 1999 Stanley Cup Picture but were not engraved on the cup.
- In February, Dallas added Doug Lidster from the Canadian National Team and Brad Lukowich from the minor league Kalamazoo Wings. Lidster played 17 regular season and 4 playoff games. Lukowich played 14 regular season and 8 playoff games (2 games in the conference finals). They were left off the cup even though they played in the playoffs.

== Draft picks ==
The Stars' picks at the 1998 NHL entry draft in Buffalo, New York.

Round	#	Player	Position	Nationality	College/Junior/Club team (League)
2	39	John Erskine	(D)	Canada	London Knights (OHL)
2	57	Tyler Bouck	(RW)	Canada	Prince George Cougars (WHL)
3	86	Gabriel Karlsson	(C)	Sweden	HV71 (J20 SuperElit)
6	153	Pavel Patera	(RW)	Czech Republic	AIK IF (J20 SuperElit)
6	173	Niko Kapanen	(C)	Finland	HPK (SM-liiga)
7	200	Scott Perry	(C)	United States	Boston University (Hockey East)
