= 1998–99 Vancouver Canucks season =

NHL hockey team season

1998–99 Vancouver Canucks
- Division: 4th Northwest
- Conference: 13th Western
- 1998–99 record: 23–47–12
- Home record: 14–21–6
- Road record: 9–26–6
- Goals for: 192
- Goals against: 258

Team information
- General manager: Brian Burke
- Coach: Mike Keenan (Oct.–Jan.); Marc Crawford (Jan.–Apr.)
- Captain: Mark Messier
- Alternate captains: Bryan McCabe; Mattias Ohlund
- Arena: General Motors Place
- Average attendance: 15,806
- Minor league affiliate: Syracuse Crunch (AHL)

Team leaders
- Goals: Markus Naslund (36)
- Assists: Mark Messier (35)
- Points: Markus Naslund (66)
- Penalty minutes: Donald Brashear (209)
- Plus/minus: Bret Hedican (+7)
- Wins: Garth Snow (20)
- Goals against average: Garth Snow (2.93)

The 1998–99 Vancouver Canucks season was the team's 29th in the National Hockey League (NHL). The Canucks missed the playoffs for the third consecutive season.

== Regular season ==
The Canucks led the league in power-play opportunities against, with 450, and short-handed goals, with 17.

=== Final standings ===
Northwest Division
R	CR		GP	W	L	T	GF	GA	PIM	Pts
1	2	**Colorado Avalanche**	82	44	28	10	239	205	1619	98
2	8	**Edmonton Oilers**	82	33	37	12	230	226	1373	78
3	9	Calgary Flames	82	30	40	12	211	234	1389	72
4	13	Vancouver Canucks	82	23	47	12	192	258	1764	58

Western Conference
R		Div	GP	W	L	T	GF	GA	Pts
**1**	**p – Dallas Stars**	**PAC**	**82**	**51**	**19**	**12**	**236**	**168**	**114**
**2**	**y – Colorado Avalanche**	**NW**	**82**	**44**	**28**	**10**	**239**	**205**	**98**
**3**	**y – Detroit Red Wings**	**CEN**	**82**	**43**	**32**	**7**	**245**	**202**	**93**
**4**	**Phoenix Coyotes**	**PAC**	**82**	**39**	**31**	**12**	**205**	**197**	**90**
**5**	**St. Louis Blues**	**CEN**	**82**	**37**	**32**	**13**	**237**	**209**	**87**
**6**	**Mighty Ducks of Anaheim**	**PAC**	**82**	**35**	**34**	**13**	**215**	**206**	**83**
**7**	**San Jose Sharks**	**PAC**	**82**	**31**	**33**	**18**	**196**	**191**	**80**
**8**	**Edmonton Oilers**	**NW**	**82**	**33**	**37**	**12**	**230**	**226**	**78**
9	Calgary Flames	NW	82	30	40	12	211	234	72
10	Chicago Blackhawks	CEN	82	29	41	12	202	248	70
11	Los Angeles Kings	PAC	82	32	45	5	189	222	69
12	Nashville Predators	CEN	82	28	47	7	190	261	63
13	Vancouver Canucks	NW	82	23	47	12	192	258	58

Divisions: CEN – Central, PAC – Pacific, NW – Northwest

bold – Qualified for playoffs; p – Won Presidents' Trophy; y – Won division

== Schedule and results ==
1998–99 regular season
October: 4–4–1 (home: 2–1–1; road: 2–3–0)

Game	Date	Score	Opponent	Record	Recap
1	October 12, 1998	4–2	Los Angeles Kings (1998–99)	1–0–0	W
2	October 14, 1998	1–4	Edmonton Oilers (1998–99)	1–1–0	L
3	October 17, 1998	4–1	Toronto Maple Leafs (1998–99)	2–1–0	W
4	October 20, 1998	1–3	@ Carolina Hurricanes (1998–99)	2–2–0	L
5	October 21, 1998	2–1	@ Washington Capitals (1998–99)	3–2–0	W
6	October 23, 1998	5–0	@ Florida Panthers (1998–99)	4–2–0	W
7	October 25, 1998	2–3	@ Tampa Bay Lightning (1998–99)	4–3–0	L
8	October 27, 1998	4–5	@ Nashville Predators (1998–99)	4–4–0	L
9	October 30, 1998	2–2 OT	Pittsburgh Penguins (1998–99)	4–4–1	T

November: 5–9–0 (home: 3–3–0; road: 2–6–0)

Game	Date	Score	Opponent	Record	Recap
10	November 1, 1998	4–1	Washington Capitals (1998–99)	5–4–1	W
11	November 2, 1998	3–5	@ Edmonton Oilers (1998–99)	5–5–1	L
12	November 7, 1998	5–3	Nashville Predators (1998–99)	6–5–1	W
13	November 9, 1998	3–4	Los Angeles Kings (1998–99)	6–6–1	L
14	November 12, 1998	4–3	@ Calgary Flames (1998–99)	7–6–1	W
15	November 13, 1998	5–2	Mighty Ducks of Anaheim (1998–99)	8–6–1	W
16	November 15, 1998	1–2	Colorado Avalanche (1998–99)	8–7–1	L
17	November 18, 1998	2–4	@ Phoenix Coyotes (1998–99)	8–8–1	L
18	November 19, 1998	5–0	@ Colorado Avalanche (1998–99)	9–8–1	W
19	November 21, 1998	2–4	Detroit Red Wings (1998–99)	9–9–1	L
20	November 23, 1998	3–4	@ Ottawa Senators (1998–99)	9–10–1	L
21	November 25, 1998	1–5	@ Toronto Maple Leafs (1998–99)	9–11–1	L
22	November 27, 1998	1–7	@ Detroit Red Wings (1998–99)	9–12–1	L
23	November 29, 1998	2–6	@ Philadelphia Flyers (1998–99)	9–13–1	L

December: 4–6–3 (home: 3–3–1; road: 1–3–2)

Game	Date	Score	Opponent	Record	Recap
24	December 1, 1998	1–1 OT	@ Boston Bruins (1998–99)	9–13–2	T
25	December 4, 1998	4–1	Dallas Stars (1998–99)	10–13–2	W
26	December 6, 1998	3–3 OT	Phoenix Coyotes (1998–99)	10–13–3	T
27	December 9, 1998	4–4 OT	@ Mighty Ducks of Anaheim (1998–99)	10–13–4	T
28	December 12, 1998	0–3	@ Los Angeles Kings (1998–99)	10–14–4	L
29	December 17, 1998	2–1	Colorado Avalanche (1998–99)	11–14–4	W
30	December 19, 1998	4–6	Nashville Predators (1998–99)	11–15–4	L
31	December 22, 1998	5–3	@ Calgary Flames (1998–99)	12–15–4	W
32	December 23, 1998	5–2	Calgary Flames (1998–99)	13–15–4	W
33	December 26, 1998	0–2	@ San Jose Sharks (1998–99)	13–16–4	L
34	December 27, 1998	0–3	@ Edmonton Oilers (1998–99)	13–17–4	L
35	December 29, 1998	2–4	Colorado Avalanche (1998–99)	13–18–4	L
36	December 31, 1998	2–6	Philadelphia Flyers (1998–99)	13–19–4	L

January: 3–6–2 (home: 2–3–2; road: 1–3–0)

Game	Date	Score	Opponent	Record	Recap
37	January 2, 1999	1–2	Montreal Canadiens (1998–99)	13–20–4	L
38	January 4, 1999	0–4	@ St. Louis Blues (1998–99)	13–21–4	L
39	January 6, 1999	4–6	@ Dallas Stars (1998–99)	13–22–4	L
40	January 8, 1999	1–1 OT	Florida Panthers (1998–99)	13–22–5	T
41	January 10, 1999	2–0	Dallas Stars (1998–99)	14–22–5	W
42	January 14, 1999	1–3	Edmonton Oilers (1998–99)	14–23–5	L
43	January 16, 1999	2–2 OT	Detroit Red Wings (1998–99)	14–23–6	T
44	January 18, 1999	5–3	@ Dallas Stars (1998–99)	15–23–6	W
45	January 19, 1999	1–4	@ Nashville Predators (1998–99)	15–24–6	L
46	January 28, 1999	2–4	St. Louis Blues (1998–99)	15–25–6	L
47	January 30, 1999	3–2	Chicago Blackhawks (1998–99)	16–25–6	W

February: 3–8–3 (home: 2–3–0; road: 1–5–3)

Game	Date	Score	Opponent	Record	Recap
48	February 1, 1999	0–1	Ottawa Senators (1998–99)	16–26–6	L
49	February 3, 1999	1–2	@ Montreal Canadiens (1998–99)	16–27–6	L
50	February 4, 1999	4–8	@ New York Rangers (1998–99)	16–28–6	L
51	February 7, 1999	3–3 OT	@ New York Islanders (1998–99)	16–28–7	T
52	February 9, 1999	4–3	@ New Jersey Devils (1998–99)	17–28–7	W
53	February 11, 1999	5–6 OT	@ Pittsburgh Penguins (1998–99)	17–29–7	L
54	February 13, 1999	3–1	Boston Bruins (1998–99)	18–29–7	W
55	February 15, 1999	1–8	@ St. Louis Blues (1998–99)	18–30–7	L
56	February 17, 1999	0–4	@ Chicago Blackhawks (1998–99)	18–31–7	L
57	February 20, 1999	1–5	Mighty Ducks of Anaheim (1998–99)	18–32–7	L
58	February 23, 1999	4–4 OT	@ Colorado Avalanche (1998–99)	18–32–8	T
59	February 24, 1999	1–1 OT	@ San Jose Sharks (1998–99)	18–32–9	T
60	February 26, 1999	1–0	Carolina Hurricanes (1998–99)	19–32–9	W
61	February 28, 1999	0–2	Buffalo Sabres (1998–99)	19–33–9	L

March: 3–9–2 (home: 2–6–1; road: 1–3–1)

Game	Date	Score	Opponent	Record	Recap
62	March 3, 1999	3–4	San Jose Sharks (1998–99)	19–34–9	L
63	March 5, 1999	1–5	Calgary Flames (1998–99)	19–35–9	L
64	March 7, 1999	2–2 OT	Chicago Blackhawks (1998–99)	19–35–10	T
65	March 10, 1999	4–4 OT	@ Mighty Ducks of Anaheim (1998–99)	19–35–11	T
66	March 11, 1999	3–0	@ Phoenix Coyotes (1998–99)	20–35–11	W
67	March 13, 1999	1–3	@ Los Angeles Kings (1998–99)	20–36–11	L
68	March 15, 1999	1–2	New Jersey Devils (1998–99)	20–37–11	L
69	March 19, 1999	1–3	New York Islanders (1998–99)	20–38–11	L
70	March 20, 1999	3–4	@ Edmonton Oilers (1998–99)	20–39–11	L
71	March 24, 1999	2–5	@ Colorado Avalanche (1998–99)	20–40–11	L
72	March 25, 1999	1–4	St. Louis Blues (1998–99)	20–41–11	L
73	March 27, 1999	5–1	Montreal Canadiens (1998–99)	21–41–11	W
74	March 29, 1999	1–0	Phoenix Coyotes (1998–99)	22–41–11	W
75	March 31, 1999	5–6	Toronto Maple Leafs (1998–99)	22–42–11	L

April: 1–5–1 (home: 0–2–1; road: 1–3–0)

Game	Date	Score	Opponent	Record	Recap
76	April 2, 1999	0–7	San Jose Sharks (1998–99)	22–43–11	L
77	April 3, 1999	2–5	@ San Jose Sharks (1998–99)	22–44–11	L
78	April 5, 1999	1–2	@ Chicago Blackhawks (1998–99)	22–45–11	L
79	April 7, 1999	1–6	@ Detroit Red Wings (1998–99)	22–46–11	L
80	April 10, 1999	1–1 OT	Edmonton Oilers (1998–99)	22–46–12	T
81	April 12, 1999	2–0	@ Calgary Flames (1998–99)	23–46–12	W
82	April 14, 1999	4–5	Calgary Flames (1998–99)	23–47–12	L

Legend: W Win (2 points) L Loss (0 points) T Tie (1 point)

== Player statistics ==
=== Scoring ===
- Position abbreviations: C = Centre; D = Defence; G = Goaltender; LW = Left wing; RW = Right wing
- † = Joined team via a transaction (e.g., trade, waivers, signing) during the season. Stats reflect time with the Canucks only.
- ‡ = Left team via a transaction (e.g., trade, waivers, release) during the season. Stats reflect time with the Canucks only.

No.	Player	Pos	Regular season					
No.	Player	Pos	GP	G	A	Pts	+/-	PIM
19	Markus Naslund	RW	80	36	30	66	−13	74
11	Mark Messier	C	59	13	35	48	−12	33
89	Alexander Mogilny	RW	59	14	31	45	0	58
17	Bill Muckalt	RW	73	16	20	36	−9	98
2	Mattias Ohlund	D	74	9	26	35	−19	83
6	Adrian Aucoin	D	82	23	11	34	−14	77
20	Dave Scatchard	C	82	13	13	26	−12	140
4	Bryan McCabe	D	69	7	14	21	−11	120
8	Donald Brashear	LW	82	8	10	18	−25	209
9	Brad May	LW	66	6	11	17	−14	102
44	Todd Bertuzzi	C	32	8	8	16	−6	44
27	Harry York†	C	49	7	9	16	−2	20
22	Peter Zezel‡	C	41	6	8	14	5	16
26	Trent Klatt†	RW	73	4	10	14	−3	12
15	Dave Gagner†	C	33	2	12	14	−9	24
3	Bret Hedican‡	D	42	2	11	13	7	34
55	Ed Jovanovski†	D	31	2	9	11	−5	44
27	Brandon Convery‡	C	12	2	7	9	5	8
29 (Note: Schaefer wore number 15 in his first eight games.)	Peter Schaefer	LW	25	4	4	8	−1	8
23	Murray Baron	D	81	2	6	8	−23	115
21 (Note: Holden wore number 14 in his first eleven games.)	Josh Holden	C	30	2	4	6	−10	10
14	Darby Hendrickson†	C	27	2	2	4	−15	22
18	Bert Robertsson	D	39	2	2	4	−7	13
34	Jason Strudwick	D	65	0	3	3	−19	114
36	Chris McAllister‡	D	28	1	1	2	−7	63
24	Matt Cooke	LW	30	0	2	2	−12	27
5	Dana Murzyn	D	12	0	2	2	1	21
25	Steve Staios	RW	57	0	2	2	−12	54
3	Brent Sopel	D	5	1	0	1	−1	4
7	Jamie Huscroft‡	D	26	0	1	1	−3	63
30	Garth Snow	G	65	0	1	1		34
7	Robb Gordon	C	4	0	0	0	0	2
31	Corey Hirsch	G	20	0	0	0		0
28	Steve Washburn†	C	8	0	0	0	0	2
35	Kevin Weekes†	G	11	0	0	0		0

=== Goaltending ===
- † = Joined team via a transaction (e.g., trade, waivers, signing) during the season. Stats reflect time with the Canucks only.

No.	Player	Regular season									
No.	Player	GP	W	L	T	SA	GA	GAA	SV%	SO	TOI
30	Garth Snow	65	20	31	8	1715	171	2.99	.900	6	3501
31	Corey Hirsch	20	3	8	3	435	48	3.13	.890	1	919
35	Kevin Weekes†	11	0	8	1	257	34	3.83	.868	0	532

== Awards and records ==
=== Awards ===
Type	Award/honour	Recipient	Ref
League (in-season)	NHL All-Star Game selection	Markus Naslund	
League (in-season)	NHL All-Star Game selection	Mattias Ohlund (Note: Ohlund was an injury replacement.)	
Team	Babe Pratt Trophy	Adrian Aucoin	
Team	Cyclone Taylor Trophy	Markus Naslund	
Team	Cyrus H. McLean Trophy	Markus Naslund	
Team	Fred J. Hume Award	Adrian Aucoin	
Team	Molson Cup	Garth Snow	
Team	Most Exciting Player Award	Markus Naslund	

=== Milestones ===
Milestone	Player	Date	Ref
First game	Bill Muckalt	October 12, 1998	
First game	Matt Cooke	October 14, 1998	
First game	Josh Holden	November 1, 1998	
First game	Peter Schaefer	November 7, 1998	
First game	Robb Gordon	April 3, 1999	
First game	Brent Sopel	April 5, 1999	

== Transactions ==
=== Trades ===
October 19, 1998	To Vancouver Canucks Trent Klatt	To Philadelphia Flyers 6th-round pick in 2000 (Jeff Dwyer)
January 18, 1999	To Vancouver Canucks Ed Jovanovski; Dave Gagner; Mike Brown rights to Kevin Weekes; 1st-round pick in 2000 (Nathan Smith)	To Florida Panthers Pavel Bure; Bret Hedican the rights to Brad Ference; 3rd-round pick in 2000 (Robert Fried)
March 8, 1999	To Vancouver Canucks future considerations	To Phoenix Coyotes Jamie Huscroft

== Draft picks ==
Vancouver's picks at the 1998 NHL entry draft in Buffalo, New York.

Round	#	Player	Nationality	NHL team	College/Junior/Club team (League)
1	4	Bryan Allen (D)	Canada	Vancouver Canucks	Oshawa Generals (OHL)
2	31	Artem Chubarov (C)	Russia	Vancouver Canucks	Dynamo Moscow (Russia)
3	68	Jarkko Ruutu (W)	Finland	Vancouver Canucks (from New York Islanders)	HIFK (Finland)
3	81	Justin Morrison (RW)	United States	Vancouver Canucks (from Philadelphia Flyers)	Colorado College (WCHA)
4	90	Regan Darby (D)	Canada	Vancouver Canucks	Tri-City Americans (WHL)
5	136	David Ytfeldt (D)	Sweden	Vancouver Canucks	Leksands IF (Sweden)
5	140	Rick Bertran (D)	Canada	Vancouver Canucks	Kitchener Rangers (OHL)
6	149	Paul Cabana (W)	Canada	Vancouver Canucks	Fort McMurray Oil Barons (AJHL)
7	177	Vince Malts (RW)	Canada	Vancouver Canucks	Hull Olympiques (QMJHL)
8	204	Craig Mischler (C)	United States	Vancouver Canucks (from Boston Bruins)	Northeastern University (Hockey East)
8	219	Curtis Valentine (LW)	Canada	Vancouver Canucks	Bowling Green University (CCHA)
9	232	Jason Metcalfe (D)	Canada	Vancouver Canucks	London Knights (OHL)

== Farm teams ==
Syracuse Crunch (AHL)

== See also ==
- 1998–99 NHL season
