= 1998–99 Calgary Flames season =

NHL team season

1998–99 Calgary Flames
- Division: 3rd Northwest
- Conference: 9th Western
- 1998–99 record: 30–40–12
- Home record: 15–20–6
- Road record: 15–20–6
- Goals for: 211
- Goals against: 234

Team information
- General manager: Al Coates
- Coach: Brian Sutter
- Captain: Todd Simpson
- Alternate captains: Theoren Fleury (Oct.–Feb.); Jason Wiemer
- Arena: Canadian Airlines Saddledome
- Average attendance: 16,201
- Minor league affiliates: Saint John Flames; Johnstown Chiefs

Team leaders
- Goals: Theoren Fleury (30)
- Assists: Phil Housley (43)
- Points: Theoren Fleury (69)
- Penalty minutes: Jason Wiemer (177)
- Plus/minus: Theoren Fleury (+18); Todd Simpson (+18)
- Wins: Fred Brathwaite (11)
- Goals against average: Fred Brathwaite (2.45)

The 1998–99 Calgary Flames season was the 19th National Hockey League season in Calgary. The Flames opened their season up at "home", in Tokyo, Japan, as the NHL scheduled a two-game series in the Asian country between the Flames and the San Jose Sharks.

The Flames were plagued by numerous injuries to their goaltenders, including both starter Ken Wregget and backup Tyler Moss at the same time. Ultimately, the Flames were forced to recall Tyrone Garner from his junior team on an emergency basis before finally signing Fred Brathwaite, who was playing in Europe with the Canadian National team. The highly popular Brathwaite recorded a shutout against the Dallas Stars in his first start, allowing the Flames goaltending situation to stabilize. In all, the Flames used six different goaltenders.

Calgary Flames 3rd jersey logo, introduced in 1998

February 28, 1999, marked the end of an era for the Flames, as diminutive star Theoren Fleury was dealt to the Colorado Avalanche in a five player trade that ultimately saw prospect Robyn Regehr come to the Flames as part of the deal. Fleury was the Flames' all-time leading scorer when he was dealt. The deal was made as the small-market Flames felt they would be unable to meet Fleury's contract demands, as he was set to become an Unrestricted Free Agent in the summer.

Despite losing their top star, the Flames proceeded to win seven of their first ten games without Fleury, propelling them into a playoff position. Calgary would win only two of their last eleven games, however, falling to 9th in the conference and missing the playoffs by six points.

Before being dealt, Fleury represented the Flames at the 1999 NHL All Star Game, recording two assists for the North American team.

During this season, the Flames introduced the "flaming horse" third jerseys in conjunction with the "Year of the Cowboy."

Prior to the season, the Flames lost defenceman Joel Bouchard to the Nashville Predators in the 1998 NHL expansion draft. In addition, the Flames dealt Jim Dowd to the Preds in exchange for a promise not to draft a goaltender in the draft.

== Regular season ==
=== Season standings ===
Northwest Division
R	CR		GP	W	L	T	GF	GA	PIM	Pts
1	2	**Colorado Avalanche**	82	44	28	10	239	205	1619	98
2	8	**Edmonton Oilers**	82	33	37	12	230	226	1373	78
3	9	Calgary Flames	82	30	40	12	211	234	1389	72
4	13	Vancouver Canucks	82	23	47	12	192	258	1764	58

Western Conference
R		Div	GP	W	L	T	GF	GA	Pts
**1**	**p – Dallas Stars**	**PAC**	**82**	**51**	**19**	**12**	**236**	**168**	**114**
**2**	**y – Colorado Avalanche**	**NW**	**82**	**44**	**28**	**10**	**239**	**205**	**98**
**3**	**y – Detroit Red Wings**	**CEN**	**82**	**43**	**32**	**7**	**245**	**202**	**93**
**4**	**Phoenix Coyotes**	**PAC**	**82**	**39**	**31**	**12**	**205**	**197**	**90**
**5**	**St. Louis Blues**	**CEN**	**82**	**37**	**32**	**13**	**237**	**209**	**87**
**6**	**Mighty Ducks of Anaheim**	**PAC**	**82**	**35**	**34**	**13**	**215**	**206**	**83**
**7**	**San Jose Sharks**	**PAC**	**82**	**31**	**33**	**18**	**196**	**191**	**80**
**8**	**Edmonton Oilers**	**NW**	**82**	**33**	**37**	**12**	**230**	**226**	**78**
9	Calgary Flames	NW	82	30	40	12	211	234	72
10	Chicago Blackhawks	CEN	82	29	41	12	202	248	70
11	Los Angeles Kings	PAC	82	32	45	5	189	222	69
12	Nashville Predators	CEN	82	28	47	7	190	261	63
13	Vancouver Canucks	NW	82	23	47	12	192	258	58

Divisions: CEN – Central, PAC – Pacific, NW – Northwest

bold – Qualified for playoffs; p – Won Presidents' Trophy; y – Won division

== Schedule and results ==
1998–99 regular season
October: 2–5–2 (home: 0–2–2; road: 2–3–0)

Game	Date	Visitor	Score	Home	OT	Decision	Attendance	Record	Pts	Recap
1	October 9	San Jose	3 – 3	Calgary	OT	Wregget	N/A^{†}	0–0–1	1	T
2	October 10	Calgary	5 – 3	San Jose		Wregget	N/A^{†}	1–0–1	3	W
3	October 16	Toronto	7 – 3	Calgary		Wregget	17,104	1–1–1	3	L
4	October 18	Calgary	0 – 2	Detroit		Wregget	19,983	1–2–1	3	L
5	October 20	Calgary	1 – 3	Dallas		Wregget	16,181	1–3–1	3	L
6	October 23	Calgary	4 – 3	Nashville		Wregget	14,902	2–3–1	5	W
7	October 24	Calgary	3 – 4	St. Louis		Wregget	19,036	2–4–1	5	L
8	October 28	Pittsburgh	5 – 2	Calgary		Wregget	15,112	2–5–1	5	L
9	October 30	Washington	0 – 0	Calgary	OT	Wregget	15,164	2–5–2	6	T
^{†}The Flames and Sharks opened the season with a "home and home" series in Tokyo, Japan.

November: 5–8–0 (home: 4–4–0; road: 1–4–0)

Game	Date	Visitor	Score	Home	OT	Decision	Attendance	Record	Pts	Recap
10	November 1	Calgary	4 – 1	Chicago		Wregget	15,034	3–5–2	8	W
11	November 3	Calgary	5 – 2	Detroit		Moss	19,983	4–5–2	10	W
12	November 6	Nashville	2 – 1	Calgary		Moss	15,471	4–6–2	10	L
13	November 8	Colorado	1 – 3	Calgary		Giguère	16,556	5–6–2	12	W
14	November 10	Los Angeles	4 – 5	Calgary	OT	Giguère	15,247	6–6–2	14	W
15	November 12	Vancouver	4 – 3	Calgary		Moss	15,358	6–7–2	14	L
16	November 14	Anaheim	1 – 0	Calgary		Moss	16,288	6–8–2	14	L
17	November 16	Detroit	3 – 5	Calgary		Moss	15,896	7–8–2	16	W
18	November 19	Calgary	3 – 4	Montreal		Giguère	20,102	7–9–2	16	L
19	November 21	Calgary	1 – 4	Ottawa		Moss	17,154	7–10–2	16	L
20	November 23	Calgary	2 – 3	Toronto		Giguère	15,726	7–11–2	16	L
21	November 25	Calgary	3 – 4	Nashville		Giguère	14,511	7–12–2	16	L
22	November 27	Edmonton	3 – 2	Calgary		Moss	17,104	7–13–2	16	L
23	November 28	Chicago	4 – 5	Calgary		Giguère	15,642	8–13–2	18	W

December: 4–8–1 (home: 1–6–0; road: 3–2–1)

Game	Date	Visitor	Score	Home	OT	Decision	Attendance	Record	Pts	Recap
24	December 3	Tampa Bay	1 – 4	Calgary		Moss	15,203	9–13–2	20	W
25	December 5	Phoenix	3 – 2	Calgary		Moss	15,285	9–14–2	20	L
26	December 7	Dallas	3 – 2	Calgary		Moss	16,351	9–15–2	22	L
27	December 11	Calgary	2 – 1	Tampa Bay		Giguère	11,614	10–15–2	24	W
28	December 12	Calgary	4 – 2	Florida		Giguère	17,337	11–15–2	26	W
29	December 14	Calgary	2 – 5	NY Rangers		Giguère	18,200	11–16–2	26	L
30	December 17	Calgary	3 – 3	Philadelphia	OT	Giguère	19,449	11–16–3	27	T
31	December 18	Calgary	5 – 2	New Jersey		Giguère	17,324	12–16–3	29	W
32	December 22	Vancouver	5 – 3	Calgary		Giguère	16,874	12–17–3	29	L
33	December 23	Calgary	2 – 5	Vancouver		Giguère	15,987	12–18–3	29	L
34	December 27	Colorado	2 – 1	Calgary		Giguère	17,104	12–19–3	29	L
35	December 29	Philadelphia	4 – 3	Calgary	OT	Trefilov	17,104	12–20–3	29	L
36	December 31	Montreal	2 – 1	Calgary		N/A	N/A	12–21–3	29	L

January: 4–6–2 (home: 3–1–1; road: 1–5–1)

Game	Date	Visitor	Score	Home	OT	Decision	Attendance	Record	Pts	Recap
37	January 2	Calgary	1 – 7	Buffalo		Trefilov	16,419	12–22–3	29	L
38	January 4	Calgary	1 – 5	Boston		Garner	14,491	12–23–3	29	L
39	January 5	Calgary	1 – 5	Pittsburgh		Garner	11,992	12–24–3	29	L
40	January 8	Dallas	0 – 1	Calgary		Brathwaite	16,278	13–24–3	31	W
41	January 10	Florida	2 – 1	Calgary		Brathwaite	15,348	13–25–3	31	L
42	January 13	Calgary	2 – 1	Anaheim		Brathwaite	13,542	14–25–3	33	W
43	January 14	Calgary	0 – 3	Los Angeles		Brathwaite	10,334	14–26–3	33	L
44	January 16	Calgary	3 – 3	San Jose	OT	Brathwaite	17,483	14–26–4	34	T
45	January 19	Detroit	1 – 3	Calgary		Brathwaite	15,840	15–26–4	36	W
46	January 21	Calgary	2 – 4	Colorado		Brathwaite	16,061	15–27–4	36	L
47	January 28	Chicago	6 – 6	Calgary	OT	Brathwaite	15,807	15–27–5	37	T
48	January 30	St. Louis	3 – 4	Calgary	OT	Brathwaite	15,822	16–27–5	39	W

February: 5–2–5 (home: 4–2–3; road: 1–0–2)

Game	Date	Visitor	Score	Home	OT	Decision	Attendance	Record	Pts	Recap
49	February 1	Calgary	2 – 2	Dallas	OT	Brathwaite	16,928	16–27–6	40	T
50	February 2	Calgary	2 – 2	Phoenix	OT	Brahwaite	14,117	16–27–7	41	T
51	February 4	Nashville	2 – 2	Calgary	OT	Brathwaite	15,062	16–27–8	42	T
52	February 6	Ottawa	2 – 1	Calgary		Brathwaite	16,498	16–28–8	42	L
53	February 8	Edmonton	1 – 2	Calgary		Brathwaite	16,842	17–28–8	44	W
54	February 9	Calgary	2 – 1	Colorado		Wregget	16,061	18–28–8	46	W
55	February 12	Boston	3 – 4	Calgary		Brathwaite	15,856	19–28–8	48	W
56	February 19	Anaheim	3 – 6	Calgary		Wregget	16,347	20–28–8	50	W
57	February 20	Los Angeles	2 – 2	Calgary		Brathwaite	16,758	20–28–9	51	T
58	February 22	NY Rangers	2 – 6	Calgary		Brathwaite	17,104	21–28–9	53	W
59	February 24	Buffalo	2 – 2	Calgary	OT	Brathwaite	15,382	21–28–10	54	T
60	February 26	St. Louis	4 – 2	Calgary		Brathwaite	16,103	21–29–10	54	L

March: 7–5–2 (home: 2–1–0; road: 5–4–2)

Game	Date	Visitor	Score	Home	OT	Decision	Attendance	Record	Pts	Recap
61	March 1	San Jose	2 – 1	Calgary		Wregget	16,358	21–30–10	54	L
62	March 5	Calgary	5 – 1	Vancouver		Brathwaite	14,005	22–30–10	56	W
63	March 6	Calgary	4 – 1	Los Angeles		Brathwaite	14,451	23–30–10	58	W
64	March 9	Calgary	7 – 4	St. Louis		Wregget	14,861	24–30–10	60	W
65	March 12	Calgary	1 – 2	Carolina		Wregget	8,564	24–31–10	60	L
66	March 13	Calgary	5 – 4	Washington	OT	Brathwaite	19,740	25–31–10	62	W
67	March 16	Calgary	4 – 2	Nashville		Wregget	17,298	26–31–10	64	W
68	March 17	Calgary	1 – 3	Chicago		Brathwaite	15,650	26–32–10	64	L
69	March 21	NY Islanders	1 – 2	Calgary		Wregget	16,571	27–32–10	66	W
70	March 22	Calgary	2 – 2	Edmonton	OT	Wregget	17,100	27–32–11	67	T
71	March 25	Montreal	1 – 2	Calgary		Wregget	17,104	28–32–11	69	W
72	March 27	Calgary	1 – 2	Phoenix		Wregget	16,210	28–33–11	69	L
73	March 28	Calgary	1 – 5	Anaheim		Brathwaite	15,975	28–34–11	69	L
74	March 30	Calgary	3 – 3	Colorado	OT	Wregget	16,061	28–34–12	70	T

April: 2–6–0 (home: 1–4–0; road: 1–2–0)

Game	Date	Visitor	Score	Home	OT	Decision	Attendance	Record	Pts	Recap
75	April 1	Phoenix	4 – 1	Calgary		Wregget	16,453	28–35–12	70	L
76	April 3	Toronto	5 – 1	Calgary		Wregget	17,104	28–36–12	70	L
77	April 7	Calgary	2 – 4	Edmonton		Wregget	17,100	28–37–12	70	L
78	April 9	Edmonton	4 – 1	Calgary		Wregget	17,104	28–38–12	70	L
79	April 12	Vancouver	2 – 0	Calgary		Brathwaite	15,238	28–39–12	70	L
80	April 14	Calgary	5 – 4	Vancouver		Brathwaite	15,135	29–39–12	72	W
81	April 15	Colorado	1 – 4	Calgary		Wregget	17,104	30–39–12	74	W
82	April 17	Calgary	2 – 3	Edmonton		Brathwaite	17,100	30–40–12	74	L

Legend: W Win (2 points) L Loss (0 points) T Tie (1 point)

== Player statistics ==
=== Scoring ===
- Position abbreviations: C = Centre; D = Defence; G = Goaltender; LW = Left wing; RW = Right wing
- † = Joined team via a transaction (e.g., trade, waivers, signing) during the season. Stats reflect time with the Flames only.
- ‡ = Left team via a transaction (e.g., trade, waivers, release) during the season. Stats reflect time with the Flames only.

No.	Player	Pos	Regular season					
No.	Player	Pos	GP	G	A	Pts	+/-	PIM
14	Theoren Fleury‡	RW	60	30	39	69	18	68
16	Cory Stillman	C	76	27	30	57	7	38
6	Phil Housley	D	79	11	43	54	14	52
8	Valeri Bure	RW	80	26	27	53	0	22
12	Jarome Iginla	RW	82	28	23	51	1	58
21	Andrew Cassels	C	70	12	25	37	−12	18
53	Derek Morris	D	71	7	27	34	4	73
11	Jeff Shantz†	C	69	12	17	29	15	40
24	Jason Wiemer	C	78	8	13	21	−12	177
23	Clarke Wilm	C	78	10	8	18	11	53
55	Steve Smith	D	69	1	14	15	3	80
62	Andrei Nazarov†	LW	36	5	9	14	1	30
18	Steve Dubinsky†	C	61	4	10	14	−7	14
32	Cale Hulse	D	73	3	9	12	−8	117
17	Hnat Domenichelli	C	23	5	5	10	−4	11
27	Todd Simpson	D	73	2	8	10	18	151
20	Rene Corbet†	LW	20	5	4	9	−2	10
42	Ed Ward	RW	68	3	5	8	−4	67
3	Denis Gauthier	D	55	3	4	7	3	68
25	Dave Roche	C	36	3	3	6	−1	44
5	Tommy Albelin	D	60	1	5	6	−11	8
26	Michael Nylander‡	C	9	2	3	5	1	2
28	Bob Bassen	C	41	1	2	3	−13	35
33	Greg Pankewicz‡	RW	18	0	3	3	0	20
18	Marty McInnis‡	C	6	1	1	2	−1	6
15 (Note: St. Louis wore number 46 in his first seven games.)	Martin St. Louis	C	13	1	1	2	−2	10
40	Fred Brathwaite†	G	28	0	2	2		2
29	Wade Belak†	D	9	0	1	1	3	23
38	Eric Charron	D	12	0	1	1	−6	14
44 (Note: Fata wore number 62 in his first seven games.)	Rico Fata	C	20	0	1	1	0	4
47	Jean-Sebastien Giguere	G	15	0	1	1		4
26	Eric Landry	C	3	0	1	1	1	0
30	Tyler Moss	G	11	0	1	1		0
19	Chris O'Sullivan‡	D	10	0	1	1	−1	2
31	Ken Wregget	G	27	0	1	1		8
26	Tom Chorske†	LW	7	0	0	0	−5	2
1	Tyrone Garner	G	3	0	0	0		0
4	Sami Helenius‡	D	4	0	0	0	−2	8
33	Lee Sorochan†	D	2	0	0	0	−3	0
22	Rocky Thompson	RW	3	0	0	0	0	25
35	Andrei Trefilov†	G	4	0	0	0		0

=== Goaltending ===
- † = Joined team via a transaction (e.g., trade, waivers, signing) during the season. Stats reflect time with the Flames only.

No.	Player	Regular season									
No.	Player	GP	W	L	T	SA	GA	GAA	SV%	SO	TOI
40	Fred Brathwaite†	28	11	9	7	796	68	2.45	.915	1	1663
31	Ken Wregget	27	10	12	4	712	67	2.87	.906	1	1590
47	Jean-Sebastien Giguere	15	6	7	1	447	46	3.21	.897	0	860
30	Tyler Moss	11	3	7	0	295	23	2.51	.922	0	550
1	Tyrone Garner	3	0	2	0	74	12	5.18	.838	0	139
35	Andrei Trefilov†	4	0	3	0	84	11	4.01	.869	0	162

== Awards and records ==
=== Awards ===
Type	Award/honour	Recipient	Ref
League (in-season)	NHL All-Star Game selection	Theoren Fleury	
Team	Molson Cup	Fred Brathwaite	
Team	Ralph T. Scurfield Humanitarian Award	Ed Ward	

=== Milestones ===
Milestone	Player	Date	Ref
First game	Rico Fata	October 9, 1998	
First game	Martin St. Louis	October 9, 1998	
First game	Clarke Wilm	October 9, 1998	
First game	Tyrone Garner	January 2, 1999	
First game	Lee Sorochan	March 27, 1999	

== Transactions ==
The Flames were involved in the following transactions during the 1998–99 season.

=== Trades ===
June 17, 1998	To Calgary Flames Ken Wregget; Dave Roche	To Pittsburgh Penguins German Titov; Todd Hlushko
June 26, 1998	To Calgary Flames Future Considerations	To Nashville Predators Jim Dowd
July 2, 1998	To Calgary Flames David Cooper	To Toronto Maple Leafs Ladislav Kohn
July 14, 1998	To Calgary Flames Bob Bassen	To Dallas Stars Aaron Gavey
August 7, 1998	To Calgary Flames Future Considerations	To Washington Capitals Rick Tabaracci
October 27, 1998	To Calgary Flames Jeff Shantz; Steve Dubinsky	To Dallas Stars Jamie Allison; Marty McInnis; Erik Andersson
December 29, 1998	To Calgary Flames Andrei Trefilov	To Chicago Blackhawks Future Considerations
February 28, 1999	To Calgary Flames Rene Corbet; Wade Belak; Robyn Regehr	To Colorado Avalanche Theoren Fleury; Chris Dingman
March 22, 1999	To Calgary Flames Tom Chorske	To Washington Capitals Future Considerations
March 23, 1999	To Calgary Flames Cash considerations	To San Jose Sharks Greg Pankewicz

=== Free agents ===
Player / Former team	Player / New team

== Draft picks ==
Calgary's picks at the 1998 NHL entry draft, held in Buffalo, New York.

Rnd	Pick	Player	Nationality	Position	Team (league)	NHL statistics				
Rnd	Pick	Player	Nationality	Position	Team (league)	GP	G	A	Pts	PIM
1	6	Rico Fata	Canada	RW	London Knights (OHL)	230	27	36	63	104
2	33	Blair Betts	Canada	C	Prince George Cougars (WHL)	477	41	37	78	118
3	62	Paul Manning	Canada	D	Colorado College (NCAA)	8	0	0	0	2
4	102	Shaun Sutter	Canada	RW	Medicine Hat Tigers (WHL)					
4	108	Dany Sabourin	Canada	G	Sherbrooke Beavers (QMJHL)	57	17–23–2–4, 2.87GAA			
5	120	Brent Gauvreau	Canada	RW	Oshawa Generals (OHL)					
7	192	Radek Duda	Czech Republic	RW	Lethbridge Hurricanes (WHL)					
8	206	Jonas Frogren	Sweden	D	Färjestads BK (SEL)	41	1	6	7	28
9	234	Kevin Mitchell	United States	D	Guelph Storm (OHL)					

== Farm teams ==
=== Saint John Flames ===
The Baby Flames finished the 1998–99 AHL season with a record of 31–40–8–1, fourth in the Atlantic Division with 71 points. They proceeded to shock the division winning Lowell Lock Monsters in the first round of the playoffs 3 games to 0. The Flames would then be swept themselves by the Fredericton Canadiens. Martin St. Louis led the Flames in both goals (28) and points (62). Saint John used five different goaltenders as a result of Calgary's injury woes in goal. Jean-Sebastien Giguere played the most games, going 18–16–3 in 39 games.

=== Johnstown Chiefs ===
The Flames signed a secondary affiliation deal with the Johnstown Chiefs of the East Coast Hockey League prior to the start of the season. They finished 27–34–9, fifth, and last, in the Northeast Division. The Chiefs missed the playoffs.

== See also ==
- 1998–99 NHL season
