= Jeff Buchanan =

Canadian ice hockey player (born 1971)

- Born: May 23, 1971 (age 54); Swift Current, Saskatchewan, Canada
- Height: 6 ft 2 in (188 cm)
- Weight: 200 lb (91 kg; 14 st 4 lb)
- Position: Defence
- Shot: Right
- Played for: Colorado Avalanche
- NHL draft: Undrafted
- Playing career: 1992–1999

Jeffrey J. Buchanan (born May 23, 1971) is a Canadian former professional ice hockey defenceman. He played in the NHL with the Colorado Avalanche.

== Playing career ==
Buchanan was born in Swift Current, Saskatchewan. Undrafted, Buchanan played with the Saskatoon Blades of the Western Hockey League. After his overage year with the Blades in 1992, Jeff signed with the Tampa Bay Lightning on July 13, 1992. Jeff was then assigned to the Lightning's affiliate the Atlanta Knights of the IHL.

Buchanan spent the next two seasons with the Knights before he was traded by the Lightning, along with Jim Cummins and Tom Tilley, to the Chicago Blackhawks for Paul Ysebaert and Rich Sutter on February 22, 1995. Buchanan never played with the Blackhawks instead playing with the Detroit Vipers and Indianapolis Ice to end the 1994–95 season.

Three years later, Buchanan was signed as a free agent by the Colorado Avalanche on August 25, 1998. He made his NHL debut in the 1998–99 season playing in 6 games for the Avalanche. After finishing the year with affiliate, the Hershey Bears of the AHL, Buchanan announced his retirement, to take up a Financial Consultant position, in August 1999.

== Career statistics ==
=== Regular season and playoffs ===
			Regular season					Playoffs
Season	Team	League	GP	G	A	Pts	PIM	GP	G	A	Pts	PIM
1989–90	Saskatoon Blades	WHL	66	7	12	19	96	9	0	2	2	2
1990–91	Saskatoon Blades	WHL	69	10	26	36	123	—	—	—	—	—
1991–92	Saskatoon Blades	WHL	72	17	37	54	143	22	10	14	24	39
1992–93	Atlanta Knights	IHL	68	4	18	22	282	9	0	0	0	26
1993–94	Atlanta Knights	IHL	76	5	24	29	253	14	0	1	1	20
1994–95	Atlanta Knights	IHL	4	0	1	1	9	—	—	—	—	—
1994–95	Detroit Vipers	IHL	50	4	6	10	125	—	—	—	—	—
1994–95	Indianapolis Ice	IHL	25	3	9	12	63	—	—	—	—	—
1995–96	Indianapolis Ice	IHL	77	4	14	18	277	5	0	1	1	9
1996–97	Orlando Solar Bears	IHL	81	11	27	38	246	—	—	—	—	—
1997–98	Orlando Solar Bears	IHL	61	5	20	25	131	—	—	—	—	—
1997–98	Kansas City Blades	IHL	7	2	3	5	6	11	0	2	2	40
1998–99	Colorado Avalanche	NHL	6	0	0	0	6	—	—	—	—	—
1998–99	Hershey Bears	AHL	38	4	6	10	102	5	0	1	1	4
IHL totals			449	38	122	160	1392	29	0	4	4	95
NHL totals			6	0	0	0	6	—	—	—	—	—
