= Pierre Champoux =

Canadian ice hockey official (born 1963)

Pierre Champoux (born April 18, 1963 in Montreal) is a retired National Hockey League linesman, who wore uniform number 67.
