= Dominic Roussel =

Canadian ice hockey player (born 1970)

- Born: February 22, 1970 (age 56) Hull, Quebec, Canada
- Height: 6 ft 1 in (185 cm)
- Weight: 180 lb (82 kg; 12 st 12 lb)
- Position: Goaltender
- Caught: Left
- Played for: Philadelphia Flyers; Winnipeg Jets; Mighty Ducks of Anaheim; Edmonton Oilers
- National team: Canada
- NHL draft: 63rd overall, 1988; Philadelphia Flyers
- Playing career: 1990–2003
- Website: www.dominicroussel.ca

Dominic Roussel (born February 22, 1970) is a Canadian former professional ice hockey goaltender who played eight seasons in the National Hockey League (NHL) for the Philadelphia Flyers, Winnipeg Jets, Mighty Ducks of Anaheim and Edmonton Oilers between 1991 and 2001. He also played in the minor American Hockey League.

== Playing career ==
As a youth, Roussel played in the 1983 Quebec International Pee-Wee Hockey Tournament with a minor ice hockey team from Laval, Quebec.

Roussel was selected in the third round of the 1988 NHL entry draft, 63rd overall, by the Philadelphia Flyers and made his NHL debut during the 1991–92 season. He would remain with the Flyers organization for another three seasons, serving as the Flyers' starting goalie in the 1993–94 season. He was traded to the Winnipeg Jets in 1996, but soon re-signed with the Flyers.

Roussel had a brief spell in Germany's Deutsche Eishockey Liga with the Starbulls Rosenheim in the 1997–98 season. His NHL rights were traded to the Nashville Predators and then the Mighty Ducks of Anaheim. After 2 1/2 seasons with the Mighty Ducks, he was claimed off waivers by the Edmonton Oilers to be their back up.

He played five games in the Quebec Semi-Pro Hockey League with the Lasalle Rapides before returning to Germany, signing with the Frankfurt Lions before retiring in 2003.

He is now a private goalie trainer through his company, Succès hockey Dominic Roussel.

== Transactions ==
- February 27, 1996: Philadelphia trades Roussel for Tim Cheveldae and a 3rd round draft pick
- June 26, 1998: Philadelphia trades Roussel and Jeff Staples to Nashville for a 7th round draft pick (Cam Ondrik)
- October 5, 1998: Nashville trades Roussel to Anaheim for Marc Moro and Chris Mason
- January 10, 2001: claimed off waivers by the Edmonton Oilers from the Mighty Ducks of Anaheim

== Career statistics ==
=== Regular season and playoffs ===
| | | | Regular season | | | | | | | | | Playoffs |
| Season | Team | League | GP | W | L | T | MIN | GA | SO | GAA | SV% | GP | W | L | MIN | GA | SO | GAA | SV% |
|---|---|---|---|---|---|---|---|---|---|---|---|---|---|---|---|---|---|---|---|
| 1986–87 | Lac St-Louis Lions | QMAAA | 24 | 7 | 12 | 3 | 804 | 112 | 1 | 5.10 | .861 | 2 | 0 | 2 | 134 | 7 | 0 | 3.13 | — |
| 1987–88 | Trois-Rivieres Draveurs | QMJHL | 51 | 18 | 25 | 4 | 2905 | 251 | 0 | 5.18 | .858 | — | — | — | — | — | — | — | — |
| 1988–89 | Trois-Rivieres Draveurs | QMJHL | 21 | 12 | 5 | 0 | 1134 | 78 | 0 | 4.13 | .864 | | — | — | — | — | — | — | — |
| 1988–89 | Shawinigan Cataractes | QMJHL | 25 | 12 | 10 | 2 | 1421 | 93 | 0 | 3.93 | .861 | 10 | 6 | 4 | 638 | 36 | 0 | 3.39 | .896 |
| 1989–90 | Shawinigan Cataracets | QMJHL | 37 | 20 | 14 | 1 | 1985 | 133 | 0 | 4.02 | .878 | 2 | 1 | 1 | 120 | 12 | 0 | 6.00 | .862 |
| 1990–91 | Hershey Bears | AHL | 45 | 20 | 14 | 7 | 2507 | 151 | 1 | 3.61 | .888 | 7 | 3 | 4 | 366 | 21 | 0 | 3.44 | — |
| 1991–92 | Philadelphia Flyers | NHL | 17 | 7 | 8 | 2 | 922 | 40 | 1 | 2.60 | .908 | — | — | — | — | — | — | — | — |
| 1991–92 | Hershey Bears | AHL | 35 | 15 | 11 | 6 | 2040 | 121 | 1 | 3.56 | .888 | — | — | — | — | — | — | — | — |
| 1992–93 | Philadelphia Flyers | NHL | 34 | 13 | 11 | 5 | 1769 | 111 | 1 | 3.76 | .881 | — | — | — | — | — | — | — | — |
| 1992–93 | Hershey Bears | AHL | 6 | 0 | 3 | 3 | 372 | 23 | 0 | 3.71 | .892 | — | — | — | — | — | — | — | — |
| 1993–94 | Philadelphia Flyers | NHL | 60 | 29 | 20 | 5 | 3285 | 183 | 1 | 3.34 | .896 | — | — | — | — | — | — | — | — |
| 1994–95 | Philadelphia Flyers | NHL | 19 | 11 | 7 | 0 | 1075 | 42 | 1 | 2.34 | .914 | 1 | 0 | 0 | 23 | 0 | 0 | 0.00 | 1.000 |
| 1994–95 | Hershey Bears | AHL | 1 | 0 | 1 | 0 | 59 | 5 | 0 | 5.07 | .865 | — | — | — | — | — | — | — | — |
| 1995–96 | Philadelphia Flyers | NHL | 9 | 2 | 3 | 2 | 456 | 22 | 1 | 2.89 | .876 | — | — | — | — | — | — | — | — |
| 1995–96 | Hershey Bears | AHL | 12 | 4 | 4 | 3 | 690 | 32 | 0 | 2.78 | .914 | — | — | — | — | — | — | — | — |
| 1995–96 | Winnipeg Jets | NHL | 7 | 2 | 2 | 0 | 285 | 16 | 0 | 3.37 | .881 | — | — | — | — | — | — | — | — |
| 1996–97 | Philadelphia Phantoms | AHL | 36 | 18 | 9 | 3 | 1852 | 82 | 2 | 2.66 | .916 | 1 | 0 | 0 | 26 | 3 | 0 | 6.93 | .769 |
| 1997–98 | Canadian National Team | Intl | 41 | 25 | 12 | 1 | 2307 | 86 | 5 | 2.24 | .940 | — | — | — | — | — | — | — | — |
| 1997–98 | Starbulls Rosenheim | DEL | 2 | 0 | 2 | 0 | 120 | 12 | 0 | 6.00 | .829 | — | — | — | — | — | — | — | — |
| 1998–99 | Mighty Ducks of Anaheim | NHL | 18 | 4 | 5 | 4 | 884 | 37 | 1 | 2.51 | .923 | — | — | — | — | — | — | — | — |
| 1999–00 | Mighty Ducks of Anaheim | NHL | 20 | 6 | 5 | 3 | 988 | 52 | 1 | 3.16 | .883 | — | — | — | — | — | — | — | — |
| 2000–01 | Mighty Ducks of Anaheim | NHL | 13 | 2 | 5 | 2 | 653 | 31 | 0 | 2.85 | .895 | — | — | — | — | — | — | — | — |
| 2000–01 | Edmonton Oilers | NHL | 8 | 1 | 4 | 0 | 348 | 21 | 0 | 3.62 | .861 | — | — | — | — | — | — | — | — |
| 2001–02 | LaSalle Rapides | QSPHL | 5 | 2 | 2 | 1 | 304 | 22 | 0 | 4.35 | .874 | 4 | 0 | 4 | 248 | 24 | 0 | 5.80 | — |
| 2002–03 | Frankfurt Lions | DEL | 38 | — | — | — | 2169 | 109 | 1 | 3.01 | .907 | — | — | — | — | — | — | — | — |
| NHL totals | | | 205 | 77 | 70 | 23 | 10,667 | 555 | 7 | 3.12 | .895 | 1 | 0 | 0 | 23 | 0 | 0 | 0.00 | 1.000 |
