= 1999 National Hockey League All-Star Game =

Professional ice hockey exhibition game

1999 NHL All-Star Game
	1	2	3	Total
World	1	3	2	6
North America	4	3	1	8
- Date: January 24, 1999
- Arena: Ice Palace
- City: Tampa
- MVP: Wayne Gretzky (NY Rangers)
- Attendance: 19,758

The 1999 National Hockey League All-Star Game took place on January 24, 1999, at Ice Palace in Tampa, home to the Tampa Bay Lightning.

== "North America" and the World ==
The major criticism of the North America versus World format was that Canadians still represented the majority of the NHL players, and it clearly showed in the team selection: the 49th game only saw five Americans as part of the North America roster, and many notable greats were left off the all-star ballot simply as there were too many names to choose from. Some pundits even claimed that a second competitive North American all-star team could have been made from players that were not invited.

The format also allowed for teammates to face each other, something that had not been done since the 6th National Hockey League All-Star Game. Where the Colorado Avalanche, Dallas Stars, Detroit Red Wings, Montreal Canadiens, and Vancouver Canucks were among the teams that sent players to both all-star teams the year before, the fact that teammates now opposed each other was more evident in this game.

Among the more pronounced comments came from last year's winning coach Ken Hitchcock, who came off his first ever all-star game victory at any level of hockey (he had been 0–11 prior to this game): he wished that perhaps the game could be held in Europe so that the World team would have a "home game".

== Super Skills Competition ==
The World All-Stars won their second-straight skills competition over the North American All-Stars. Boston Bruins' Ray Bourque for the second straight season would have to share his Accuracy Shooting event victory with Phoenix Coyotes' Keith Tkachuk and Jeremy Roenick. In the Hardest Shot event, St. Louis Blues' defencemen Al MacInnis would win the event for the third-straight season and fifth all-time.

=== Individual event winners ===
- Puck Control Relay – Paul Kariya (Mighty Ducks of Anaheim)
- Fastest Skater – Peter Bondra (Washington Capitals) – 14.640 seconds
- Accuracy Shooting – Ray Bourque (Boston Bruins)/Keith Tkachuk (Phoenix Coyotes)/Jeremy Roenick (Phoenix Coyotes) – 4 hits, 6 shots
- Hardest Shot – Al MacInnis (St. Louis Blues) – 98.5 mph
- Goaltenders Competition – Arturs Irbe (Carolina Hurricanes) - 2 GA, 16 shots

== The game ==
The North American All-Stars defeated the World All-Stars for the second-straight year by a score of 8–6. Dallas Stars' Mike Modano and Toronto Maple Leafs' Mats Sundin recorded four points, while Carolina Hurricanes' goaltender Arturs Irbe recorded an assist to become the first goaltender in history to be credited with a point in the All-Star Game. However, New York Rangers' center Wayne Gretzky would steal the spotlight in his last All-Star appearance by recording three points to win his third-career All-Star M.V.P. honor.

=== Summary ===
	North America	World
Final score	8	6
Scoring summary	Modano (Robitaille, Pronger) 4:09 first; Robitaille (Roenick, Clark) 10:06 first; Kariya (Amonte, Modano) 16:45 first; Recchi (Gretzky, Fleury) 17:18 first; Bourque (Modano) 0:17 second; Gretzky (Fleury, Pronger) 1:14 second; Blake (Gretzky, Recchi) 14:23 second (GWG); Sydor (Modano, Amonte) 4:02 third	Sturm (Forsberg, Sundin) 9:42 first; Selanne (Yashin, Irbe) 2:02 second; Demitra (Zhitnik, Sundin) 8:59 second; Ohlund (Sundin, Naslund) 15:08 second; Sundin (Ohlund, Jagr) 2:57 third; Zubov (Khristich, Holik) 4:20 third
Penalties	None	
Shots on goal	19–15–15–49	9–15–12–36
Win/loss	W - Ron Tugnutt	L - Arturs Irbe

- Referee: Paul Devorski
- Linesmen: Pierre Champoux, Brian Murphy
- Television: Fox, CBC, SRC

== Rosters ==
	North America	World
Head coach	(Canada) Ken Hitchcock (Dallas Stars)	(Canada) Lindy Ruff (Buffalo Sabres)
Assistant coach	(Canada) Jim Schoenfeld (Phoenix Coyotes)	(United States) Robbie Ftorek (New Jersey Devils)
Lineup	Starting lineup: 2 – (Canada) D Al MacInnis (St. Louis Blues); 9 – (Canada) LW Paul Kariya (Mighty Ducks of Anaheim); 14 – (Canada) LW Brendan Shanahan (Detroit Red Wings); 30 – (Canada) G Martin Brodeur (New Jersey Devils); 77 – (Canada) D Ray Bourque (Boston Bruins); 99 – (Canada) C Wayne Gretzky (New York Rangers), Captain; Reserves: 3 – (Canada) D Rob Blake (Los Angeles Kings); 4 – (Canada) D Scott Stevens (New Jersey Devils); 5 – (Canada) D Darryl Sydor (Dallas Stars); 7 – (United States) LW Keith Tkachuk (Phoenix Coyotes); 8 – (Canada) RW Mark Recchi (Montreal Canadiens); 10 – (United States) LW John LeClair (Philadelphia Flyers); 12 – (United States) RW Tony Amonte (Chicago Blackhawks); 17 – (Canada) LW Wendel Clark (Tampa Bay Lightning); 20 – (Canada) G Ed Belfour (Dallas Stars); 21 – (Canada) LW Luc Robitaille (Los Angeles Kings); 22 – (Canada) C Keith Primeau (Carolina Hurricanes); 27 – (United States) C Mike Modano (Dallas Stars); 31 – (Canada) G Ron Tugnutt (Ottawa Senators); 44 – (Canada) D Chris Pronger (St. Louis Blues); 55 – (Canada) D Larry Murphy (Detroit Red Wings); 74 – (Canada) RW Theoren Fleury (Calgary Flames); 88 – (Canada) C Eric Lindros (Philadelphia Flyers); 97 – (United States) C Jeremy Roenick (Phoenix Coyotes)	Starting lineup: 5 – (Sweden) D Nicklas Lidstrom (Detroit Red Wings); 8 – (Finland) RW Teemu Selanne (Mighty Ducks of Anaheim); 21 – (Sweden) C Peter Forsberg (Colorado Avalanche); 27 – (Finland) D Teppo Numminen (Phoenix Coyotes); 39 - (Czech Republic) G Dominik Hasek (Buffalo Sabres); 68 – (Czech Republic) RW Jaromir Jagr (Pittsburgh Penguins), Captain; Reserves: 1 - (Latvia) G Arturs Irbe (Carolina Hurricanes); 2 – (Sweden) D Mattias Ohlund (Vancouver Canucks); 9 – (Sweden) LW Markus Naslund (Vancouver Canucks); 12 – (Slovakia) LW Peter Bondra (Washington Capitals); 13 – (Sweden) C Mats Sundin (Toronto Maple Leafs); 14 – (Sweden) D Mattias Norstrom (Los Angeles Kings); 16 – (Czech Republic) C Bobby Holik (New Jersey Devils); 19 – (Russia) C Alexei Yashin (Ottawa Senators); 20 – (Germany) LW Marco Sturm (San Jose Sharks); 22 – (Czech Republic) D Roman Hamrlik (Edmonton Oilers); 25 – (Russia) RW Sergei Krivokrasov (Nashville Predators); 35 – (Russia) G Nikolai Khabibulin (Phoenix Coyotes); 38 – (Slovakia) LW Pavol Demitra (St. Louis Blues); 44 – (Russia) D Alexei Zhitnik (Buffalo Sabres); 56 – (Russia) D Sergei Zubov (Dallas Stars); 80 – (Ukraine) LW Dmitri Khristich (Boston Bruins); 82 – (Czech Republic) LW Martin Straka (Pittsburgh Penguins)

== See also ==
- 1998–99 NHL season

== Notes ==
- ^1Steve Yzerman was voted as a starter, but was not able to play due to injury. Eric Lindros was selected to replace Yzerman in the starting lineup, but passed the honor to Wayne Gretzky.
- ^2Uwe Krupp was voted as a starter, but was not able to play due to injury. Teppo Numminen was named as his replacement in the starting lineup.
- ^3Curtis Joseph was selected, but did not play. Ron Tugnutt was his replacement.
- Kenny Jonsson and Viktor Kozlov were named to the World team, but did not play.
