= List of Colorado Avalanche award winners =

Colorado Avalanche awards
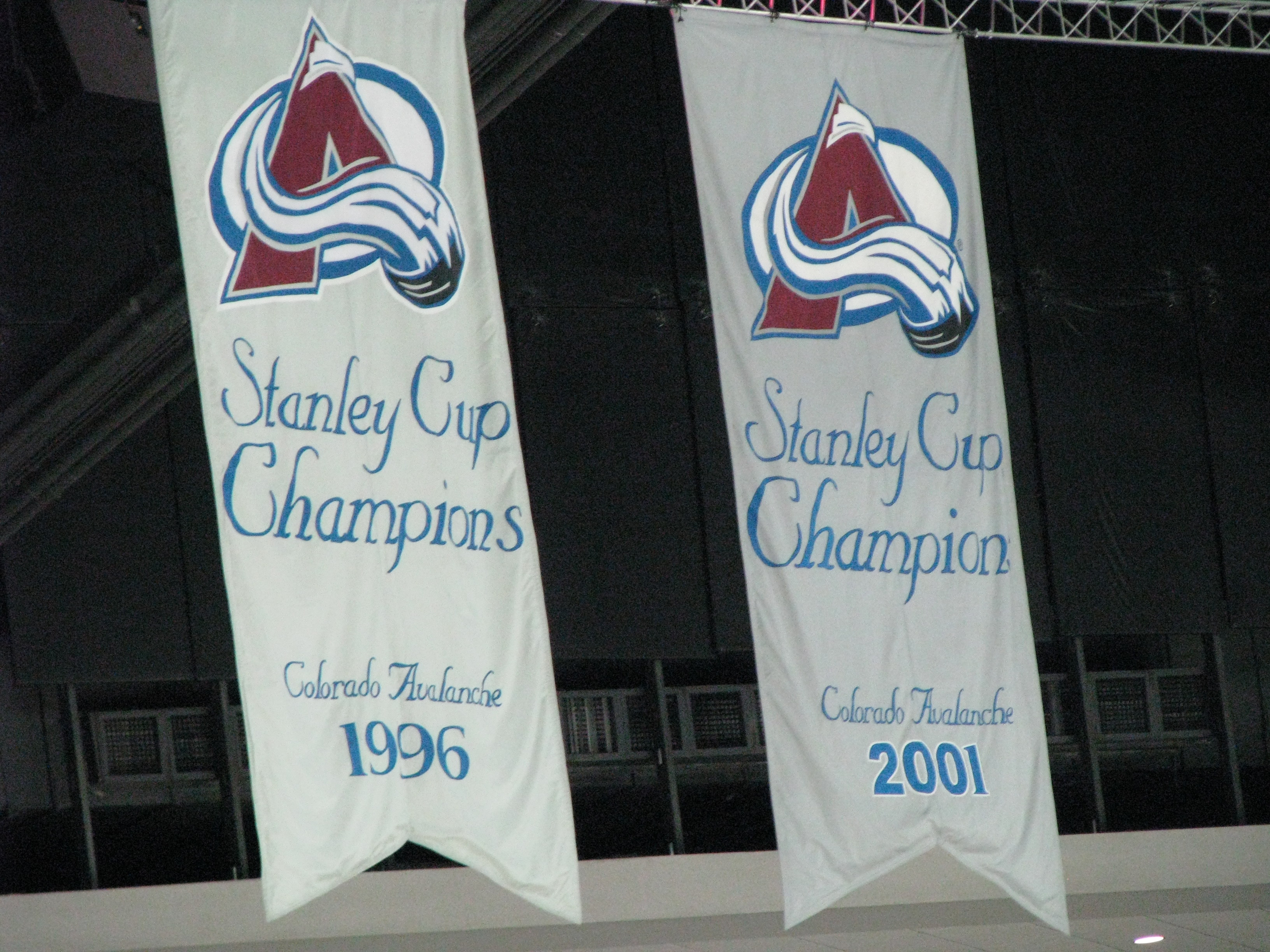
- Stanley Cup banners hanging in the Pepsi Center

Team trophies
- Award*: Wins
- Stanley Cup: 3
- Clarence S. Campbell Bowl: 3
- Presidents' Trophy: 4

Individual awards
- Award*: Wins
- Art Ross Trophy: 1
- Bill Masterton Memorial Trophy: 1
- Calder Memorial Trophy: 6
- Conn Smythe Trophy: 3
- General Manager of the Year Award: 1
- Hart Memorial Trophy: 3
- Jack Adams Award: 2
- James Norris Memorial Trophy: 2
- King Clancy Memorial Trophy: 1
- Lady Byng Memorial Trophy: 3
- Lester Patrick Trophy: 1
- Mark Messier Leadership Award: 1
- Maurice "Rocket" Richard Trophy: 2
- NHL Plus-Minus Award: 2
- NHL Road Performer Award: 1
- Ted Lindsay Award: 2
- William M. Jennings Trophy: 2

Total
- Awards won: 44

This is a list of Colorado Avalanche award winners. It also includes players and data from the previous incarnation of the franchise, the Quebec Nordiques.

== League awards ==
=== Team trophies ===
Team trophies awarded to the Colorado Avalanche franchise
Award	Description	Times won	Seasons	References
Stanley Cup	NHL championship	3	1995–96, 2000–01, 2021–22	
Presidents' Trophy	Most regular season points	4	1996–97, 2000–01, 2020–21, 2025–26	
Clarence S. Campbell Bowl	Western Conference playoff championship	3	1995–96, 2000–01, 2021–22	
Avco World Trophy (WHA)	WHA championship	1	1976–77	

=== Individual awards ===
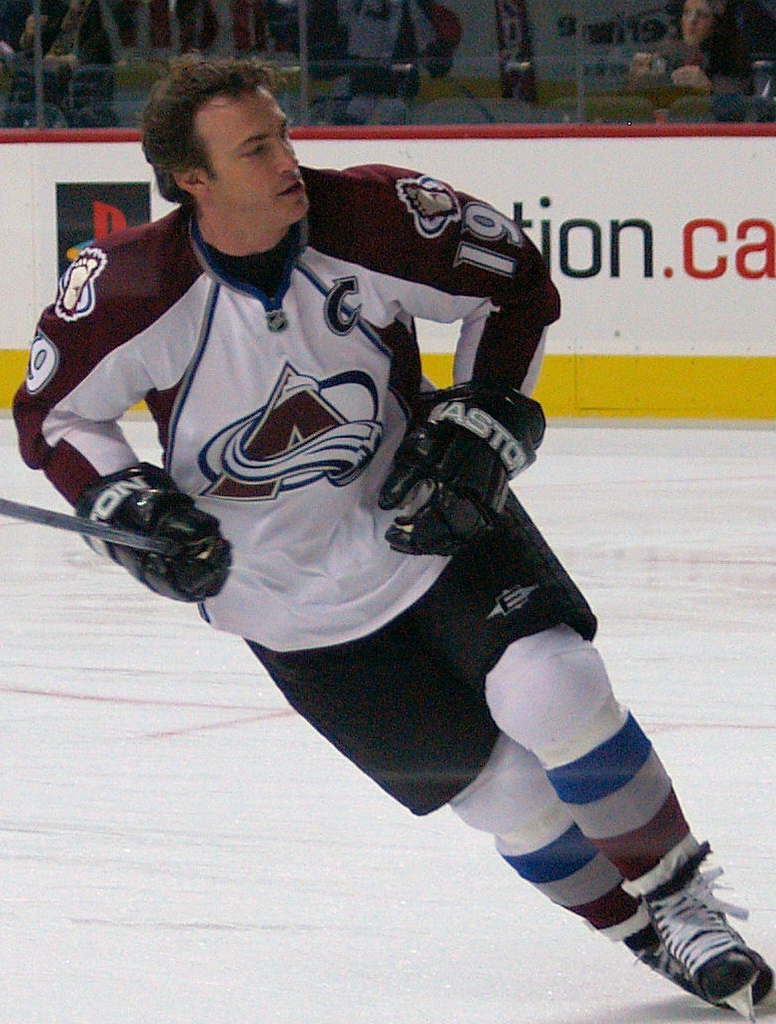
In addition to captaining his team to a second Stanley Cup, Joe Sakic also won five different league awards during the 2000–01 season.

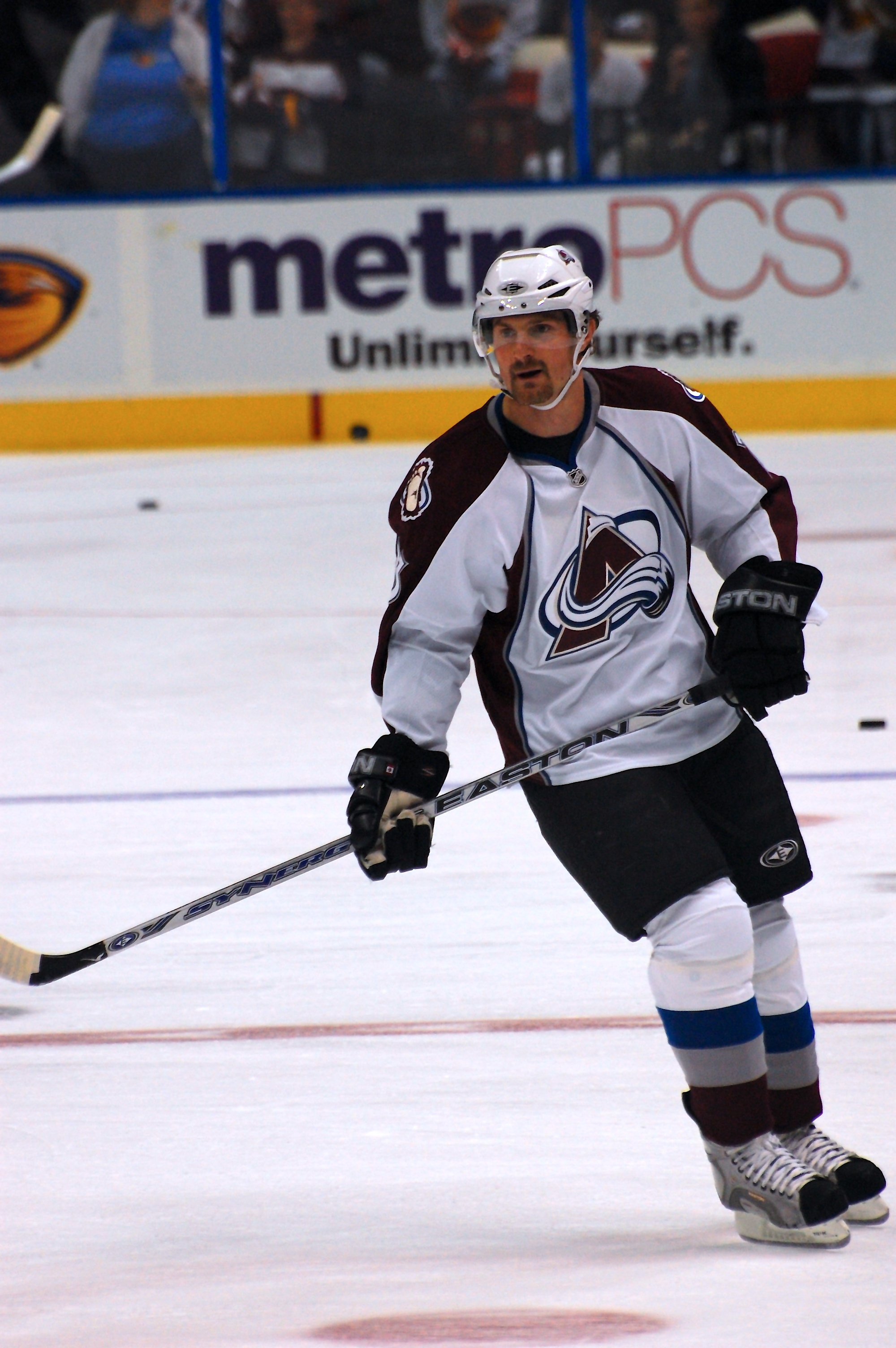
Milan Hejduk won the Rocket Richard Trophy after scoring 50 goals during the 2002–03 season.

Individual awards won by Colorado Avalanche franchise players and staff
Award	Description	Winner	Season	References
Art Ross Trophy	Regular season scoring champion	Peter Forsberg	2002–03	
Bill Hunter Trophy (WHA)	Regular season scoring champion	Marc Tardif	1975–76	
Bill Hunter Trophy (WHA)	Regular season scoring champion	Marc Tardif	1977–78	
Bill Hunter Trophy (WHA)	Regular season scoring champion	Real Cloutier	1976–77	
Bill Hunter Trophy (WHA)	Regular season scoring champion	Real Cloutier	1978–79	
Bill Masterton Memorial Trophy	Perseverance, sportsmanship and dedication to hockey	Gabriel Landeskog	2025–26	
Calder Memorial Trophy	Rookie of the year	Peter Stastny	1980–81	
Calder Memorial Trophy	Rookie of the year	Peter Forsberg	1994–95	
Calder Memorial Trophy	Rookie of the year	Chris Drury	1998–99	
Calder Memorial Trophy	Rookie of the year	Gabriel Landeskog	2011–12	
Calder Memorial Trophy	Rookie of the year	Nathan MacKinnon	2013–14	
Calder Memorial Trophy	Rookie of the year	Cale Makar	2019–20	
Conn Smythe Trophy	Most valuable player of the playoffs	Joe Sakic	1995–96	
Conn Smythe Trophy	Most valuable player of the playoffs	Patrick Roy	2000–01	
Conn Smythe Trophy	Most valuable player of the playoffs	Cale Makar	2021–22	
Dennis A. Murphy Trophy (WHA)	Top defenseman	J. C. Tremblay	1972–73	
Dennis A. Murphy Trophy (WHA)	Top defenseman	J. C. Tremblay	1974–75	
Gordie Howe Trophy (WHA)	Most valuable player	Marc Tardif	1975–76	
Gordie Howe Trophy (WHA)	Most valuable player	Marc Tardif	1977–78	
Hart Memorial Trophy	Most valuable player to his team during the regular season	Joe Sakic	2000–01	
Hart Memorial Trophy	Most valuable player to his team during the regular season	Peter Forsberg	2002–03	
Hart Memorial Trophy	Most valuable player to his team during the regular season	Nathan MacKinnon	2023–24	
Jack Adams Award	National Hockey League coach "adjudged to have contributed the most to his team's success."	Marc Crawford	1994–95	
Jack Adams Award	National Hockey League coach "adjudged to have contributed the most to his team's success."	Patrick Roy	2013–14	
James Norris Memorial Trophy	Top defenseman during the regular season	Cale Makar	2021–22	
James Norris Memorial Trophy	Top defenseman during the regular season	Cale Makar	2024–25	
Jim Gregory General Manager of the Year Award	Top general manager	Joe Sakic	2021–22	
King Clancy Memorial Trophy	Leadership qualities on and off the ice and humanitarian contributions within their community	Shjon Podein	2000–01	
Lady Byng Memorial Trophy	Gentlemanly conduct	Joe Sakic	2000–01	
Lady Byng Memorial Trophy	Gentlemanly conduct	Ryan O'Reilly	2013–14	
Lady Byng Memorial Trophy	Gentlemanly conduct	Nathan MacKinnon	2019–20	
Mark Messier Leadership Award	Leadership and contributions to society	Gabriel Landeskog	2025–26	
Maurice "Rocket" Richard Trophy	Most goals in the regular season	Milan Hejduk	2002–03	
Maurice "Rocket" Richard Trophy	Most goals in the regular season	Nathan MacKinnon	2025–26	
NHL Plus-Minus Award	Best plus/minus	Joe Sakic	2000–01	
NHL Plus-Minus Award	Best plus/minus	Peter Forsberg	2002–03	
NHL Plus-Minus Award	Best plus/minus	Milan Hejduk	2002–03	
Sheraton Road Performer Award	Most road points during the regular season	Joe Sakic	2003–04	
Ted Lindsay Award	Most valuable player as chosen by the players	Joe Sakic	2000–01	
Ted Lindsay Award	Most valuable player as chosen by the players	Nathan MacKinnon	2023–24	
WHA Playoff MVP (WHA)	Most valuable player of the playoffs	Serge Bernier	1976–77	
William M. Jennings Trophy	Fewest goals given up in the regular season	Patrick Roy	2001–02	
William M. Jennings Trophy	Fewest goals given up in the regular season	Mackenzie Blackwood	2025–26	
William M. Jennings Trophy	Fewest goals given up in the regular season	Scott Wedgewood	2025–26	

== All-Stars ==
=== WHA First and Second Team All-Stars ===
Quebec Nordiques selected to the WHA First and Second Team All-Stars
Player	Position	Selections	Season	Team
Serge Bernier	Center	1	1974–75	2nd
Richard Brodeur	Goaltender	1	1978–79	2nd
Real Cloutier	Right wing	4	1975–76	2nd
Real Cloutier	Right wing	4	1976–77	2nd
Real Cloutier	Right wing	4	1977–78	2nd
Real Cloutier	Right wing	4	1978–79	1st
Marc Tardif	Left wing	4	1974–75	2nd
Marc Tardif	Left wing	4	1975–76	1st
Marc Tardif	Left wing	4	1976–77	1st
Marc Tardif	Left wing	4	1977–78	1st
J. C. Tremblay	Defense	3	1973–74	2nd
J. C. Tremblay	Defense	3	1974–75	1st
J. C. Tremblay	Defense	3	1975–76	1st

=== NHL first and second team All-Stars ===
The NHL first and second team All-Stars are the top players at each position as voted on by the Professional Hockey Writers' Association.

Colorado Avalanche franchise players selected to the NHL First and Second Team All-Stars
Player	Position	Selections	Season	Team
Rob Blake	Defense	2	2000–01	2nd
Rob Blake	Defense	2	2001–02	2nd
Ray Bourque	Defense	1	2000–01	1st
Peter Forsberg	Center	3	1997–98	1st
Peter Forsberg	Center	3	1998–99	1st
Peter Forsberg	Center	3	2002–03	1st
Michel Goulet	Left wing	5	1982–83	2nd
Michel Goulet	Left wing	5	1983–84	1st
Michel Goulet	Left wing	5	1985–86	1st
Michel Goulet	Left wing	5	1986–87	1st
Michel Goulet	Left wing	5	1987–88	2nd
Milan Hejduk	Right wing	1	2002–03	2nd
Nathan MacKinnon	Center	5	2017–18	2nd
Nathan MacKinnon	Center	5	2019–20	2nd
Nathan MacKinnon	Center	5	2023–24	1st
Nathan MacKinnon	Center	5	2024–25	1st
Nathan MacKinnon	Center	5	2025–26	2nd
Cale Makar	Defense	6	2020–21	1st
Cale Makar	Defense	6	2021–22	1st
Cale Makar	Defense	6	2022–23	2nd
Cale Makar	Defense	6	2023–24	2nd
Cale Makar	Defense	6	2024–25	1st
Cale Makar	Defense	6	2025–26	1st
Sandis Ozolinsh	Defense	1	1996–97	1st
Mikko Rantanen	Right wing	1	2020–21	2nd
Patrick Roy	Goaltender	1	2001–02	1st
Joe Sakic	Center	3	2000–01	1st
Joe Sakic	Center	3	2001–02	1st
Joe Sakic	Center	3	2003–04	1st
Semyon Varlamov	Goaltender	1	2013–14	2nd

=== NHL All-Rookie Team ===
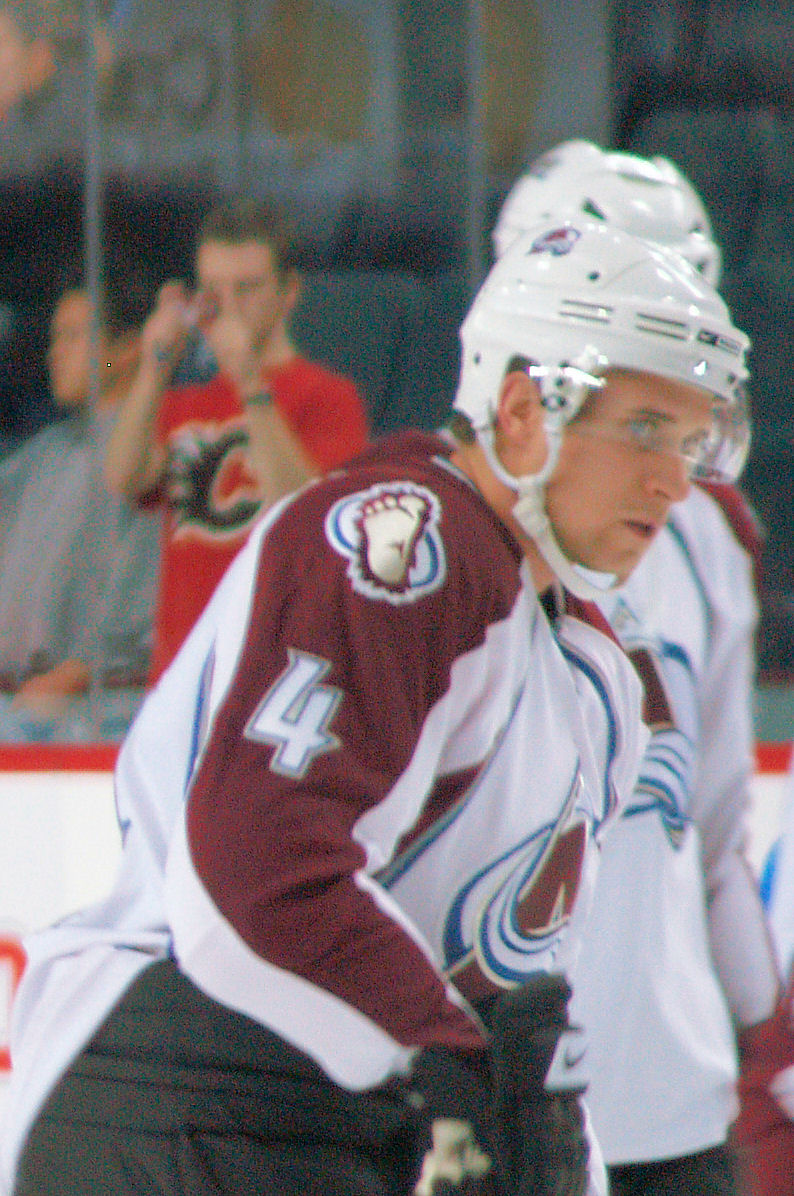
John-Michael Liles was named to the NHL All-Rookie Team for the 2003–04 season.

The NHL All-Rookie Team consists of the top rookies at each position as voted on by the Professional Hockey Writers' Association.

Colorado Avalanche franchise players selected to the NHL All-Rookie Team
Player	Position	Season
Bruce Bell	Defense	1984–85
Chris Drury	Forward	1998–99
Matt Duchene	Forward	2009–10
Peter Forsberg	Forward	1994–95
Milan Hejduk	Forward	1998–99
Gabriel Landeskog	Forward	2011–12
John-Michael Liles	Defense	2003–04
Nathan MacKinnon	Forward	2013–14
Cale Makar	Defense	2019–20
Paul Stastny	Forward	2006–07

=== All-Star Game selections ===
The National Hockey League All-Star Game is a mid-season exhibition game held annually between many of the top players of each season. Thirty-three All-Star Games have been held since the Colorado Avalanche entered the NHL as the Quebec Nordiques in 1979, with at least one player chosen to represent the franchise in each year except 2012. The All-Star game has not been held in various years: 1979 and 1987 due to the 1979 Challenge Cup and Rendez-vous '87 series between the NHL and the Soviet national team, respectively, 1995, 2005, and 2013 as a result of labor stoppages, 2006, 2010, 2014 and 2026 because of the Winter Olympic Games, 2021 as a result of the COVID-19 pandemic, and 2025 when it was replaced by the 2025 4 Nations Face-Off. Colorado has hosted one of the games. The 51st was held at the Pepsi Center.

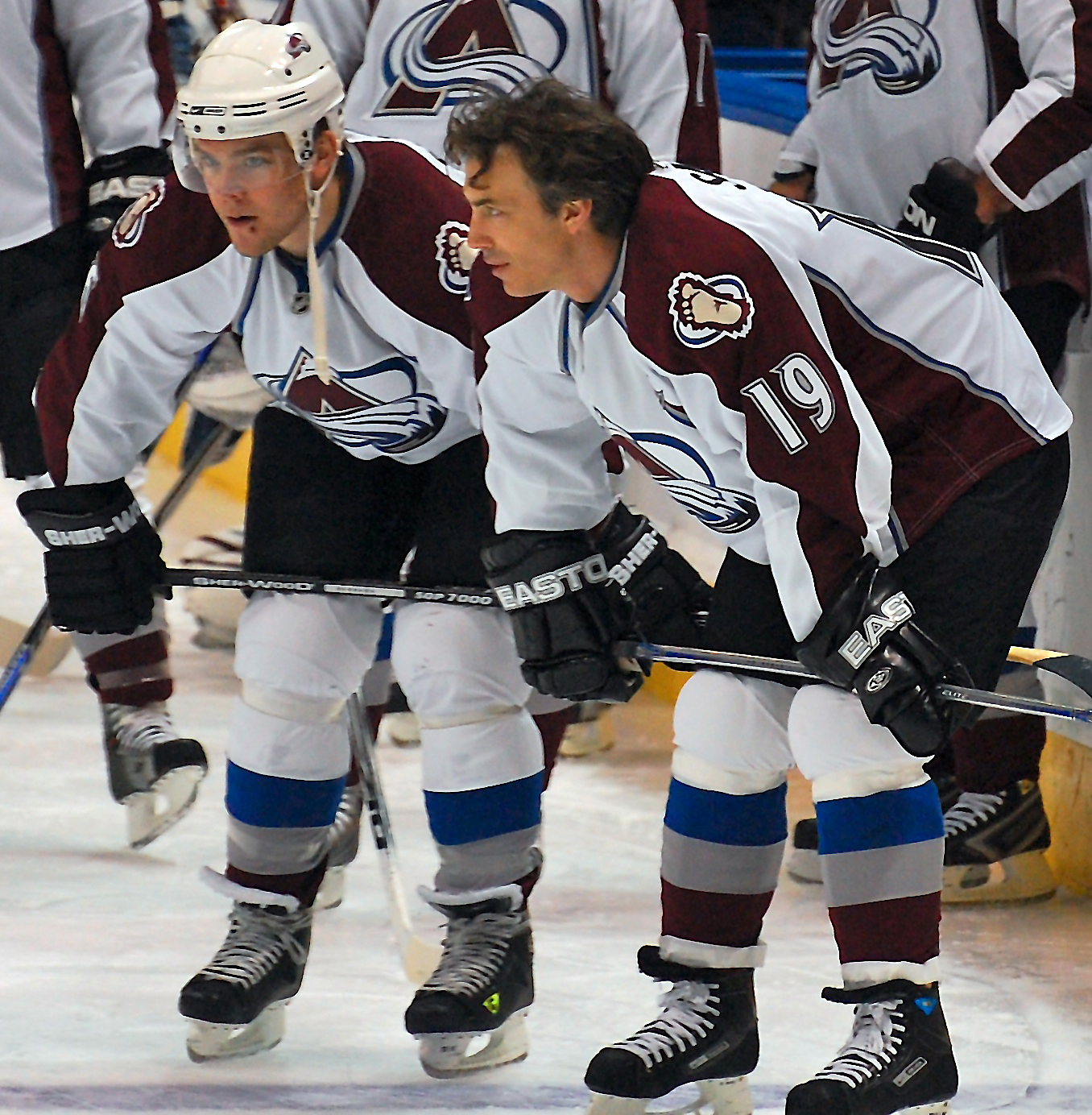
Paul Stastny (left) has been named to two All-Star games while Joe Sakic (right) has been named to a team-high 13 All-Star games.

- † Selected by fan vote
- ‡ Selected by Commissioner
- # Selected as one of four "last men in" by fan vote
- ↑ All-Star Game Most Valuable Player

Colorado Avalanche franchise players and coaches selected to the All-Star Game
Game	Year	Name	Position	References
32nd	1980	Real Cloutier	Right wing	
33rd	1981	Peter Stastny	Center	
34th	1982	Peter Stastny	Center	
34th	1982	Marc Tardif	Left wing	
35th	1983	Michel Goulet	Right wing	
35th	1983	Marian Stastny	Right wing	
35th	1983	Peter Stastny	Center	
36th	1984	Michel Goulet	Left wing	
36th	1984	Peter Stastny	Center	
37th	1985	Michel Goulet	Left wing	
38th	1986	Mario Gosselin	Goaltender	
38th	1986	Michel Goulet†	Left wing	
38th	1986	Peter Stastny	Center	
39th	1988	Michel Goulet†	Left wing	
39th	1988	Peter Stastny	Center	
40th	1989	Walt Poddubny	Center	
41st	1990	Joe Sakic	Center	
42nd	1991	Guy Lafleur‡	Right wing	
42nd	1991	Joe Sakic†	Center	
43rd	1992	Owen Nolan	Right wing	
43rd	1992	Joe Sakic	Center	
44th	1993	Steve Duchesne	Defense	
44th	1993	Joe Sakic	Center	
45th	1994	Joe Sakic	Center	
46th	1996	Peter Forsberg	Center	
46th	1996	Joe Sakic	Center	
47th	1997	Peter Forsberg (Did not play)	Center	
47th	1997	Sandis Ozolinsh†	Defense	
47th	1997	Patrick Roy†	Goaltender	
47th	1997	Joe Sakic† (Did not play)	Center	
48th	1998	Peter Forsberg†	Center	
48th	1998	Valeri Kamensky	Left wing	
48th	1998	Jari Kurri‡	Right wing	
48th	1998	Sandis Ozolinsh†	Defense	
48th	1998	Patrick Roy†	Goaltender	
48th	1998	Joe Sakic	Center	
49th	1999	Peter Forsberg†	Center	
50th	2000	Milan Hejduk	Right wing	
50th	2000	Sandis Ozolinsh†	Defense	
50th	2000	Joe Sakic	Center	
51st	2001	Rob Blake	Defense	
51st	2001	Ray Bourque†	Defense	
51st	2001	Peter Forsberg†	Center	
51st	2001	Bob Hartley	Assistant coach	
51st	2001	Milan Hejduk	Right wing	
51st	2001	Patrick Roy†	Goaltender	
51st	2001	Joe Sakic†	Center	
52nd	2002	Rob Blake†	Defense	
52nd	2002	Patrick Roy†	Goaltender	
52nd	2002	Joe Sakic	Center	
53rd	2003	Rob Blake†	Defense	
53rd	2003	Peter Forsberg	Center	
53rd	2003	Patrick Roy†	Goaltender	
54th	2004	Rob Blake†	Defense	
54th	2004	Joe Sakic↑	Center	
54th	2004	Alex Tanguay	Left wing	
55th	2007	Joe Sakic†	Center	
56th	2008	Paul Stastny (Did not play)	Center	
57th	2009	Milan Hejduk	Right wing	
58th	2011	Matt Duchene	Center	
58th	2011	Paul Stastny	Center	
59th	2012	No Avalanche selected	—	
60th	2015	Erik Johnson	Defense	
61st	2016	Matt Duchene	Center	
62nd	2017	Nathan MacKinnon	Center	
63rd	2018	Nathan MacKinnon	Center	
64th	2019	Gabriel Landeskog#	Left wing	
64th	2019	Nathan MacKinnon† (Did not play)	Center	
64th	2019	Mikko Rantanen	Right wing	
65th	2020	Nathan MacKinnon†	Center	
66th	2022	Jared Bednar	Coach	
66th	2022	Nazem Kadri#	Center	
66th	2022	Nathan MacKinnon† (Did not play)	Center	
66th	2022	Cale Makar	Defense	
67th	2023	Nathan MacKinnon†	Center	
67th	2023	Cale Makar	Defense	
67th	2023	Mikko Rantanen†	Right wing	
68th	2024	Alexandar Georgiev†	Goaltender	
68th	2024	Nathan MacKinnon	Center	
68th	2024	Cale Makar†	Defense	

=== All-Star Game replacement events ===
The Quebec Nordiques hosted Rendez-vous '87 at Le Colisée.

- † Selected by fan vote

Quebec Nordiques players and coaches selected to All-Star Game replacement events
Event	Year	Name	Position	References
Rendez-vous '87	1987	Michel Bergeron	Assistant coach	
Rendez-vous '87	1987	Michel Goulet†	Right wing	
Rendez-vous '87	1987	Clint Malarchuk† (Did not play)	Goaltender	
Rendez-vous '87	1987	Normand Rochefort	Defense	
4 Nations Face-Off	2025	Artturi Lehkonen (Finland)	Left wing	
4 Nations Face-Off	2025	Nathan MacKinnon (Canada)	Center	
4 Nations Face-Off	2025	Cale Makar (Canada)	Defense	
4 Nations Face-Off	2025	Devon Toews (Canada)	Defense	

== Career achievements ==
=== Hockey Hall of Fame ===
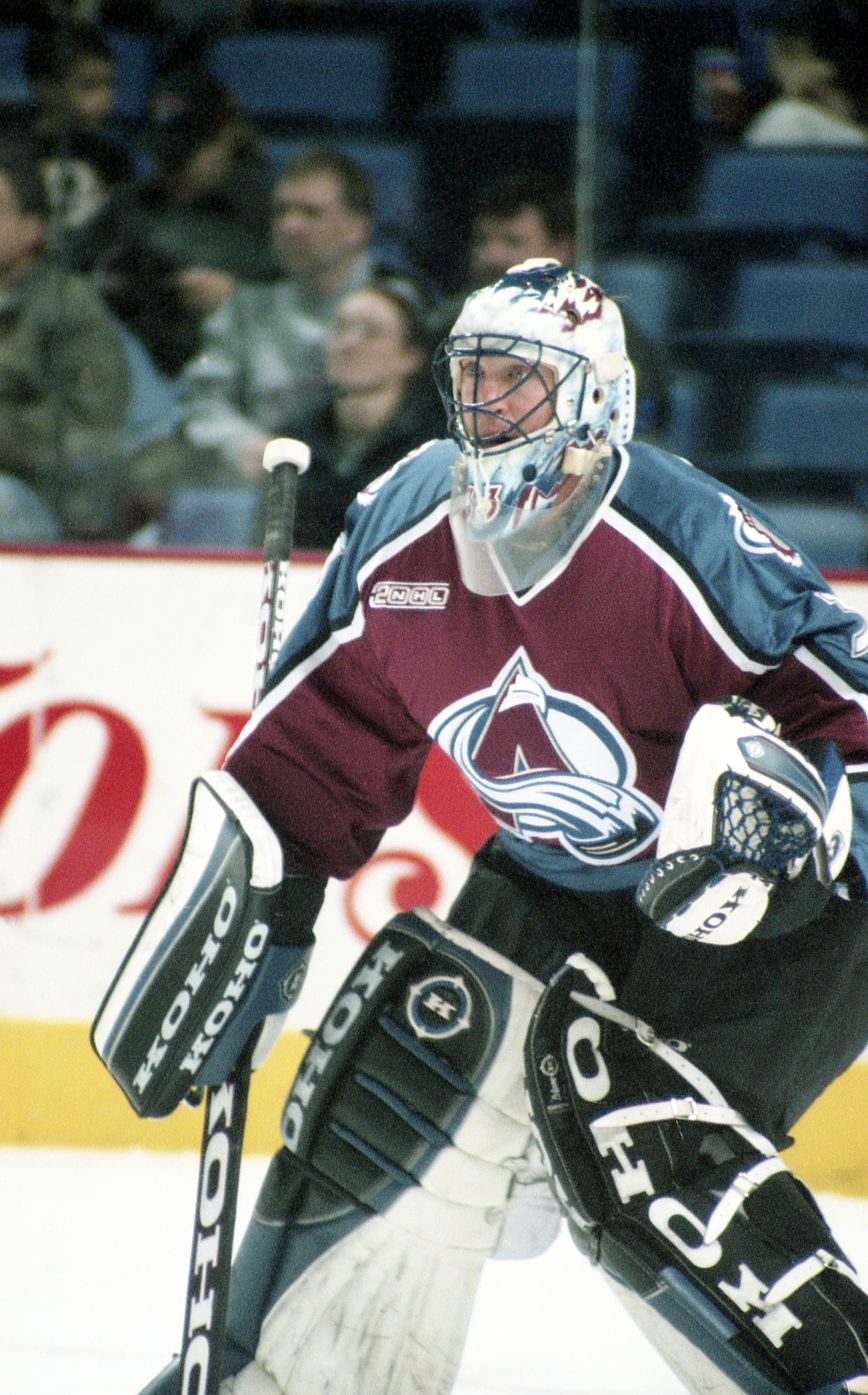
Hockey Hall of Famer Patrick Roy had his number 33 retired by the Avalanche on October 28, 2003.

The following is a list of Colorado Avalanche and Quebec Nordiques who have been enshrined in the Hockey Hall of Fame.

Colorado Avalanche franchise players and personnel inducted into the Hockey Hall of Fame
Individual	Category	Year inducted	Years with Avalanche franchise in category	References
Dave Andreychuk	Player	2017	2000	
Rob Blake	Player	2014	2001–2006	
Ray Bourque	Player	2004	2000–2001	
Peter Forsberg	Player	2014	1994–2004, 2008, 2011	
Michel Goulet	Player	1998	1979–1990	
Jarome Iginla	Player	2020	2014–2017	
Paul Kariya	Player	2017	2003–2004	
Jari Kurri	Player	2001	1997–1998	
Pierre Lacroix	Builder	2023	1994–2013	
Guy Lafleur	Player	1988	1989–1991	
Patrick Roy	Player	2006	1995–2003	
Joe Sakic	Player	2012	1988–2009	
Teemu Selanne	Player	2017	2003–2004	
Peter Stastny	Player	1998	1980–1990	
Mats Sundin	Player	2012	1990–1994	
Pierre Turgeon	Player	2023	2005–2007	

=== Lester Patrick Trophy ===
The Lester Patrick Trophy has been presented by the National Hockey League and USA Hockey since 1966 to honor a recipient's contribution to ice hockey in the United States. This list includes all personnel who have ever been employed by the Colorado Avalanche in any capacity and have also received the Lester Patrick Trophy.

Members of the Colorado Avalanche franchise honored with the Lester Patrick Trophy
Individual	Year honored	Years with Avalanche	References
Ray Bourque	2003	2000–2001	

=== United States Hockey Hall of Fame ===
Members of the Colorado Avalanche inducted into the United States Hockey Hall of Fame
Individual	Year inducted	Years with Avalanche	References
Chris Drury	2015	1998–2002	
Scott Young	2017	1992–1997	

=== Retired numbers ===
The Colorado Avalanche have retired six of their jersey numbers. The four numbers retired by the franchise when they were in Quebec – J. C. Tremblay's number 3, Marc Tardif's number 8, Michel Goulet's number 16, and Peter Stastny's number 26 – were un-retired and put back into circulation when the franchise moved to Colorado. Also out of circulation is the number 99 which was retired league-wide for Wayne Gretzky on February 6, 2000. Gretzky did not play for the Avalanche franchise during his 20-year NHL career and no player in franchise history had ever worn the number 99 prior to its retirement.

Colorado Avalanche retired numbers
Number	Player	Position	Years with Avalanche franchise as a player	Date of retirement ceremony	References
19	Joe Sakic	Center	1988–2009	October 1, 2009	
21	Peter Forsberg	Center	1994–2004, 2008, 2011	October 8, 2011	
23	Milan Hejduk	Right wing	1998–2013	January 6, 2018	
33	Patrick Roy	Goaltender	1995–2003	October 28, 2003	
52	Adam Foote	Defense	1991–2004, 2008–2011	November 2, 2013	
77	Ray Bourque	Defense	2000–2001	November 24, 2001	

== Defunct team awards ==
=== O'Keefe Cup ===
The O'Keefe Cup was an annual award given to the player who earned the most points from Star of the game selections throughout the regular season. It was discontinued when the franchise moved to Colorado in 1995.

Season	Winner
1979–80	Real Cloutier
1980–81	Peter Stastny
1981–82	Peter Stastny
1982–83	Michel Goulet
1983–84	Peter Stastny
1984–85	Michel Goulet

Season	Winner
1985–86	Peter Stastny
1986–87	Michel Goulet
1987–88	Peter Stastny
1988–89	Paul Gillis
1989–90	Joe Sakic
1990–91	Joe Sakic

Season	Winner
1991–92	Mats Sundin
1992–93	Mats Sundin
1993–94	Joe Sakic
1994–95	Joe Sakic

== Other awards ==
Colorado Avalanche franchise players who have received non-NHL awards
Award	Description	Winner	Season	References
Best NHL Player ESPY Award	Best NHL player of the last calendar year	Joe Sakic	1997	
Golden Hockey Stick	Best Czech player	Milan Hejduk	2002–03	
Viking Award	Most valuable Swedish player in NHL	Mats Sundin	1992–93	
Viking Award	Most valuable Swedish player in NHL	Mats Sundin	1993–94	
Viking Award	Most valuable Swedish player in NHL	Peter Forsberg	1995–96	
Viking Award	Most valuable Swedish player in NHL	Peter Forsberg	1997–98	
Viking Award	Most valuable Swedish player in NHL	Peter Forsberg	1998–99	

== Notes ==
^1Shared with Patrik Elias of the New Jersey Devils.
