= Molson Cup =

Award presented to a distinguished player on Canadian ice hockey teams

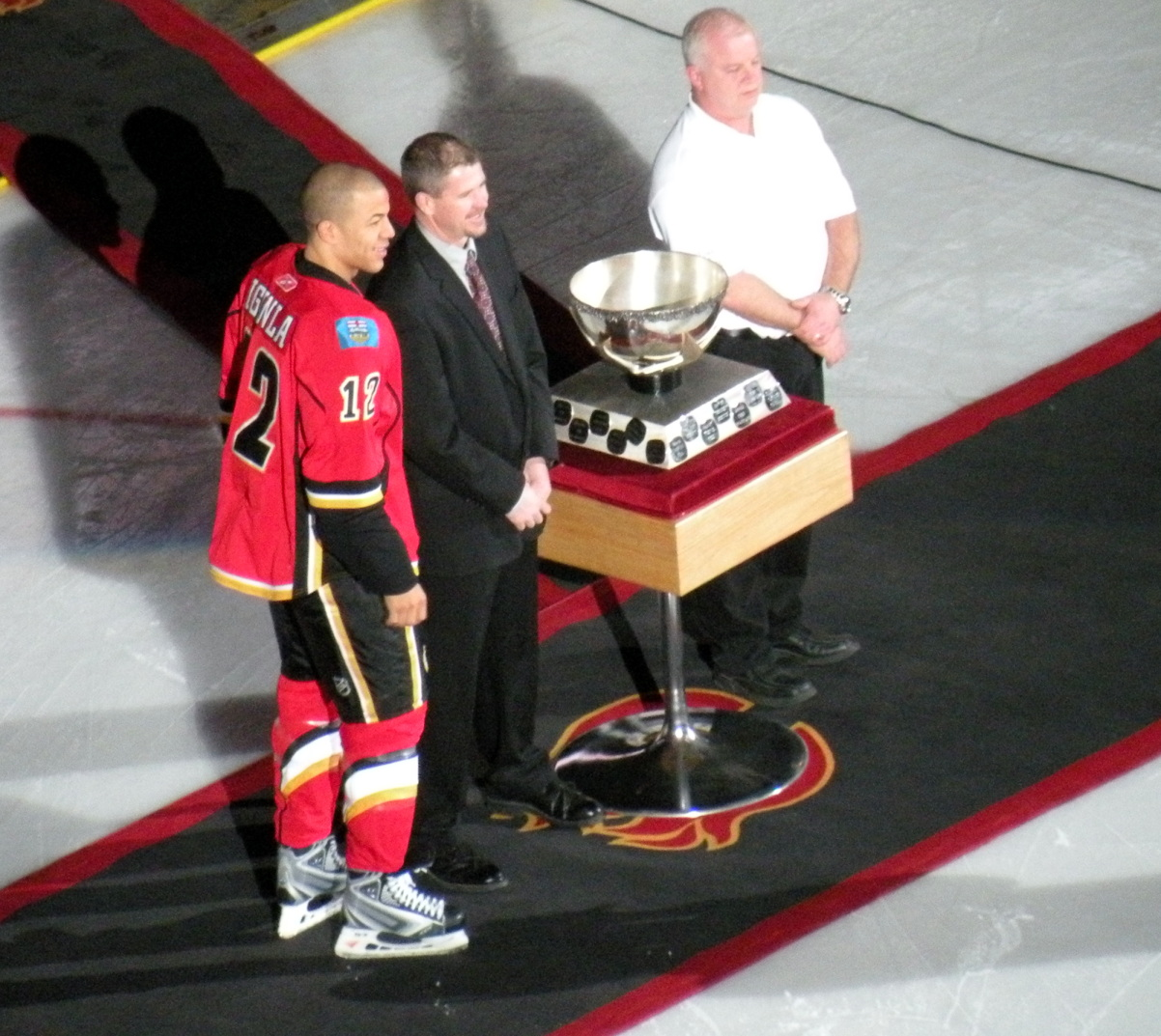
Jarome Iginla is honoured during a Molson Cup ceremony in Calgary

The Molson Cup is an award presented to a distinguished player on Canadian ice hockey teams. After each game, the "three game stars" are selected, usually by a member of the media. At the end of the season, the player with the most three-star honours is presented with the Molson Cup. Most teams also donate money to charity in the name of the winner of each monthly segment winner during the season.

The Molson Cup is not an official National Hockey League (NHL) award, but the Canadian NHL franchises have presented the award to its players. It is also bestowed by some minor professional and Canadian Hockey League clubs as well. The Quebec Major Junior Hockey League's Rookie of the Year Award was previously known as the Molson Cup.

The Molson Cup is sponsored by Molson Breweries; many hockey clubs with another brewery sponsor present a similar award with a name related to the sponsor. The Quebec Nordiques awarded an "O'Keefe Cup."

== List of winners by team ==
=== Active award ===
==== Edmonton Oilers ====
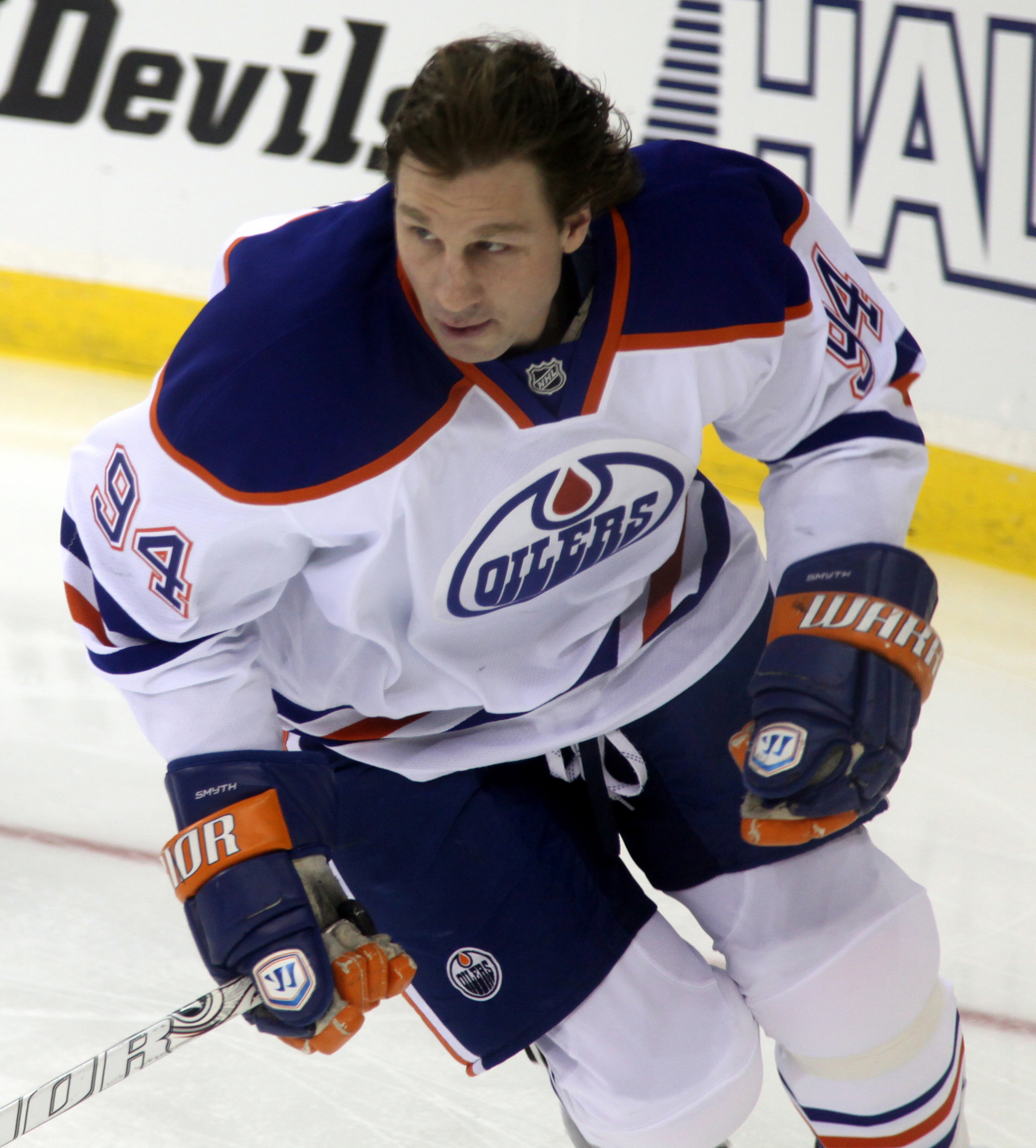
Ryan Smyth is a two-time winner of the award

Season	Winner
1979–80	Wayne Gretzky
1980–81	Wayne Gretzky
1981–82	Wayne Gretzky
1982–83	Wayne Gretzky
1983–84	Wayne Gretzky
1984–85	Wayne Gretzky
1985–86	Wayne Gretzky
1986–87	Wayne Gretzky
1987–88	Wayne Gretzky
1988–89	Grant Fuhr
1989–90	Mark Messier
1990–91	Bill Ranford
1991–92	Joe Murphy

Season	Winner
1992–93	Bill Ranford
1993–94	Bill Ranford
1994–95	Bill Ranford
1995–96	Doug Weight
1996–97	Curtis Joseph
1997–98	Curtis Joseph
1998–99	Bill Guerin
1999–00	Tommy Salo
2000–01	Tommy Salo
2001–02	Tommy Salo
2002–03	Tommy Salo
2003–04	Ryan Smyth
2005–06	Ryan Smyth

Season	Winner
2006–07	Dwayne Roloson
2007–08	Mathieu Garon
2008–09	Dwayne Roloson
2009–10	Jeff Deslauriers
2010–11	Taylor Hall
2011–12	Taylor Hall
2012–13	Devan Dubnyk
2013–14	Taylor Hall
2014–15	Jordan Eberle
2015–16	Cam Talbot
2016–17	Connor McDavid
2017–18	Connor McDavid

==== Montreal Canadiens ====
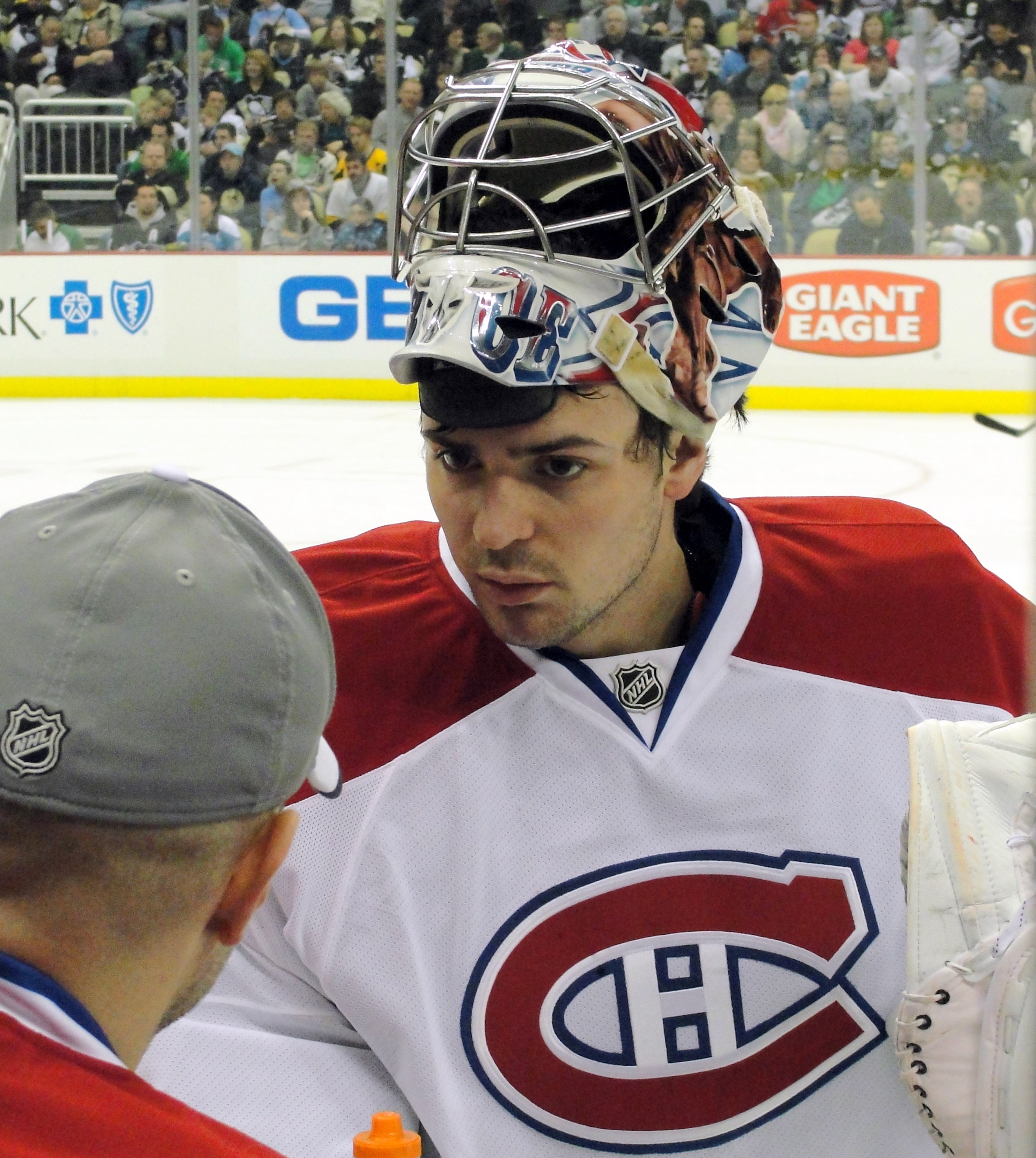
Carey Price is a nine-time winner of the award

The Canadiens typically award their Molson Cup monthly; only the end-of-season winners are listed here.

Season	Winner
1972–73	Ken Dryden
1973–74	Wayne Thomas
1974–75	Guy Lafleur
1975–76	Guy Lafleur
1976–77	Guy Lafleur
1977–78	Guy Lafleur
1978–79	Guy Lafleur
1979–80	Guy Lafleur
1980–81	Larry Robinson
1981–82	Guy Lafleur
1982–83	Mario Tremblay
1983–84	Guy Carbonneau
1984–85	Steve Penney
1985–86	Mats Näslund
1986–87	Mats Näslund
1987–88	Stéphane Richer
1988–89	Patrick Roy

Season	Winner
1989–90	Stéphane Richer
1990–91	Russ Courtnall
1991–92	Patrick Roy
1992–93	Kirk Muller
1993–94	Patrick Roy
1994–95	Patrick Roy
1995–96	Pierre Turgeon
1996–97	Mark Recchi
1997–98	Mark Recchi
1998–99	Jeff Hackett
1999–00	Jeff Hackett
2000–01	José Théodore
2001–02	José Théodore
2002–03	José Théodore
2003–04	José Théodore
2005–06	Saku Koivu
2006–07	Cristobal Huet

Season	Winner
2007–08	Alexei Kovalev
2008–09	Carey Price
2009–10	Jaroslav Halák
2010–11	Carey Price
2011–12	Carey Price
2012–13	Carey Price
2013–14	Carey Price
2014–15	Carey Price
2015–16	Alex Galchenyuk
2016–17	Carey Price
2017–18	Brendan Gallagher
2018–19	Carey Price
2019–20	Carey Price
2021–22	Nick Suzuki
2022–23	Nick Suzuki
2023–24	Nick Suzuki
2024–25	Nick Suzuki

==== Ottawa Senators ====
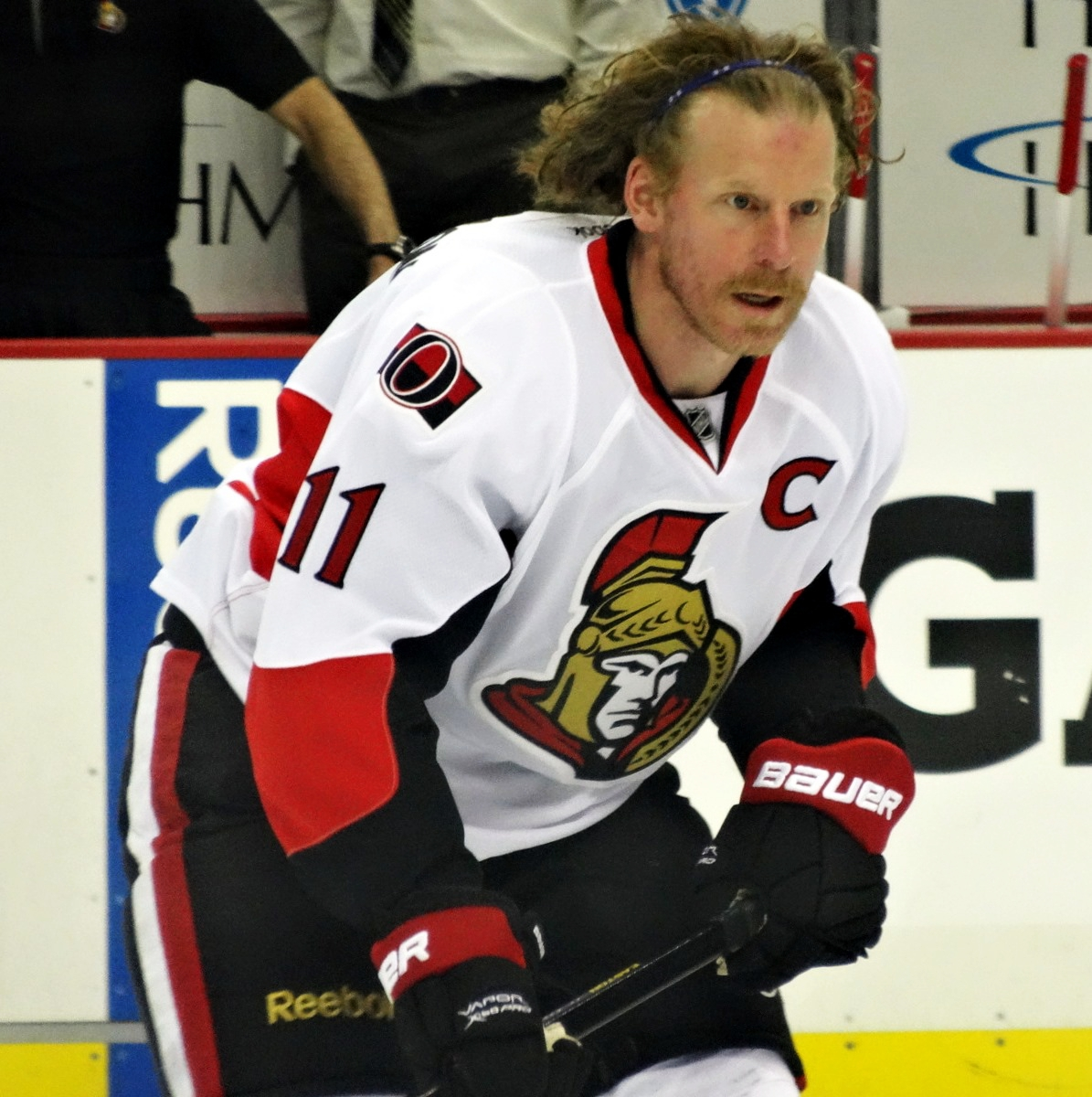
Daniel Alfredsson is a five-time winner of the award

Season	Winner
1992–93	Sylvain Turgeon
1993–94	Alexei Yashin
1994–95	Don Beaupre
1995–96	Damian Rhodes
1996–97	Alexei Yashin
1997–98	Alexei Yashin
1998–99	Alexei Yashin
1999–00	Marian Hossa
2000–01	Patrick Lalime

Season	Winner
2001–02	Daniel Alfredsson
2002–03	Daniel Alfredsson
2003–04	Daniel Alfredsson
2005–06	Daniel Alfredsson
2006–07	Ray Emery
2007–08	Martin Gerber
2008–09	Daniel Alfredsson
2009–10	Brian Elliott
2010–11	Jason Spezza

Season	Winner
2011–12	Craig Anderson
2012–13	Craig Anderson
2013–14	Craig Anderson
2014–15	Erik Karlsson
2015–16	Erik Karlsson
2016–17	Erik Karlsson
2017–18	Erik Karlsson

==== Toronto Maple Leafs ====
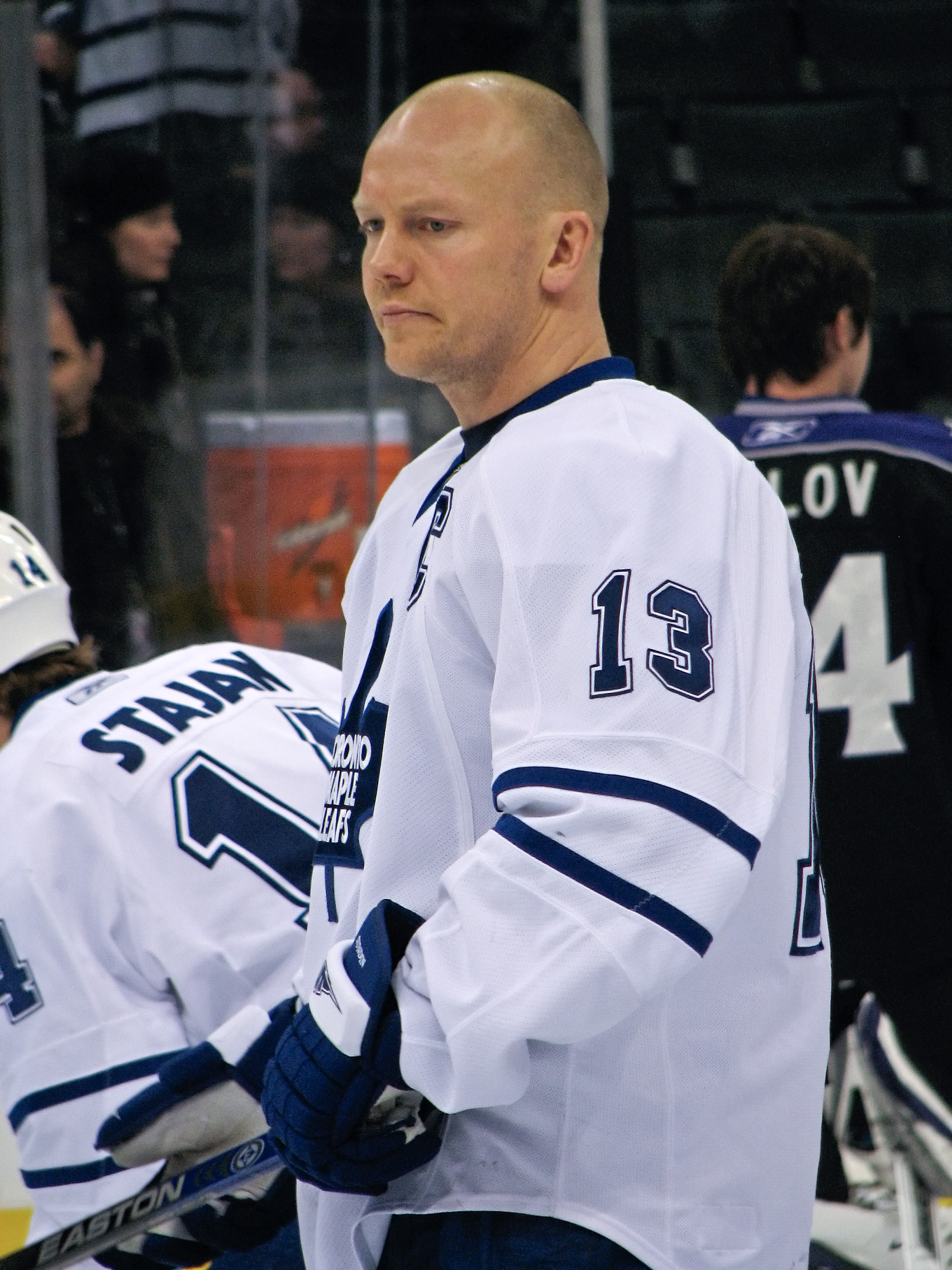
Mats Sundin is a four-time winner of the award

Season	Winner
1973–74	Borje Salming
1974–75	Darryl Sittler
1975–76	Darryl Sittler
1976–77	Borje Salming
1977–78	Borje Salming
1978–79	Darryl Sittler
1979–80	Borje Salming
1980–81	Darryl Sittler
1980–81	Wilf Paiement
1981–82	Michel Larocque
1982–83	Rick Vaive
1983–84	Rick Vaive
1984–85	Bill Derlago
1985–86	Ken Wregget
1986–87	Rick Vaive

Season	Winner
1987–88	Ken Wregget
1988–89	Gary Leeman
1989–90	Gary Leeman
1990–91	Peter Ing
1991–92	Grant Fuhr
1992–93	Doug Gilmour
1993–94	Doug Gilmour
1994–95	Mats Sundin
1995–96	Felix Potvin
1996–97	Felix Potvin
1997–98	Felix Potvin
1998–99	Curtis Joseph
1999–00	Curtis Joseph
2000–01	Curtis Joseph
2001–02	Mats Sundin

Season	Winner
2002–03	Ed Belfour
2003–04	Ed Belfour
2005–06	Mats Sundin
2006–07	Mats Sundin
2007–08	Vesa Toskala
2008–09	Vesa Toskala
2009–10	Phil Kessel
2010–11	Phil Kessel
2011–12	Phil Kessel
2012–13	James Reimer
2013–14	Jonathan Bernier
2014–15	Jonathan Bernier
2015–16	Jonathan Bernier
2016–17	Frederik Andersen
2017–18	Frederik Andersen

==== Vancouver Canucks ====
The Canucks have retitled this award the Three Stars Award in recent years.

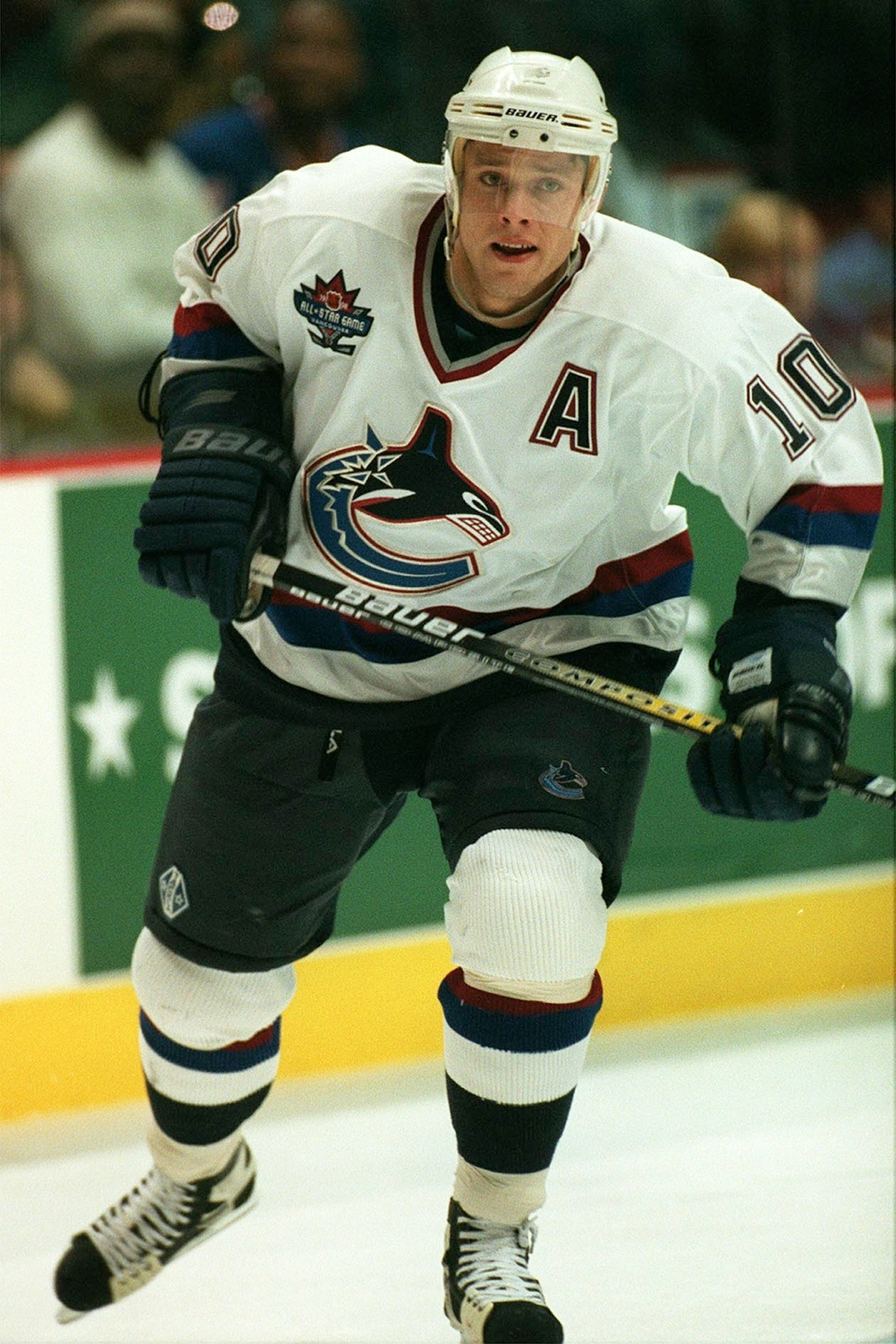
Pavel Bure is a four-time winner of the award

Season	Winner
1975–76	Bobby Lalonde
1976–77	Cesare Maniago
1977–78	Cesare Maniago
1978–79	Glen Hanlon
1979–80	Glen Hanlon
1980–81	Richard Brodeur
1981–82	Richard Brodeur
1982–83	Thomas Gradin
1983–84	Patrik Sundstrom
1984–85	Richard Brodeur
1985–86	Richard Brodeur
1986–87	Petri Skriko
1987–88	Kirk McLean
1988–89	Trevor Linden
1989–90	Kirk McLean
1990–91	Trevor Linden
1991–92	Pavel Bure

Season	Winner
1992–93	Pavel Bure
1993–94	Pavel Bure
1994–95	Kirk McLean
1995–96	Trevor Linden
1996–97	Martin Gelinas
1997–98	Pavel Bure
1998–99	Garth Snow
1999–00	Mark Messier
2000–01	Markus Naslund
2001–02	Markus Naslund
2002–03	Markus Naslund
2003–04	Dan Cloutier
2005–06	Alexander Auld
2006–07	Roberto Luongo
2007–08	Roberto Luongo
2008–09	Roberto Luongo
2009–10	Henrik Sedin

Season	Winner
2010–11	Roberto Luongo
2011–12	Roberto Luongo
2012–13	Cory Schneider
2013–14	Ryan Kesler
2014–15	Ryan Miller
2015–16	Daniel Sedin
2016–17	Ryan Miller
2017–18	Jacob Markstrom
2018–19	Jacob Markstrom
2019–20	Jacob Markstrom
2020–21	Thatcher Demko
2021–22	J.T. Miller
2022–23	Elias Pettersson
2023–24	Elias Pettersson
2024–25	Quinn Hughes
2025–26	Quinn Hughes

=== Defunct award ===
==== Calgary Flames ====
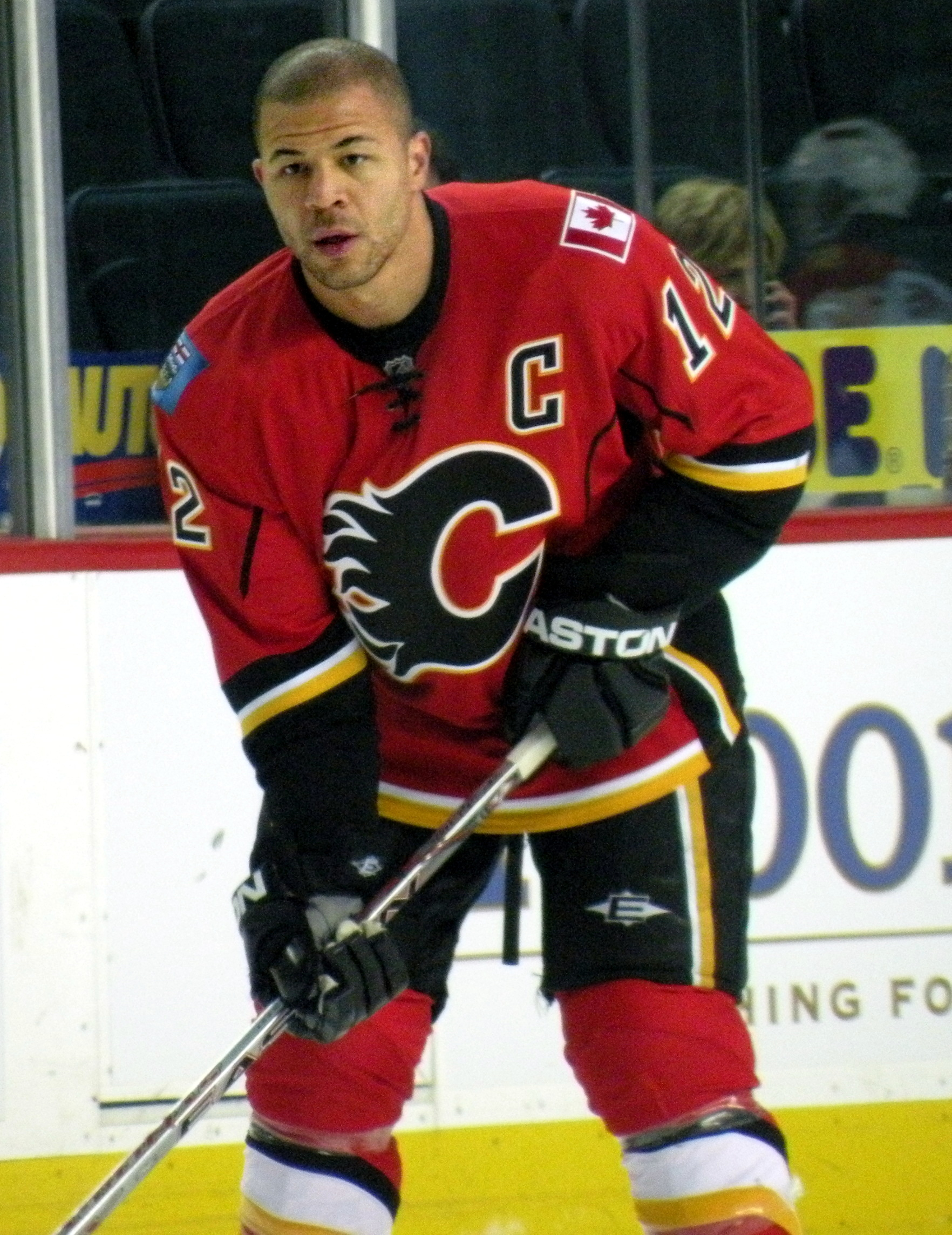
Jarome Iginla is a six-time winner of the award

The Flames last awarded the Molson Cup for the 2010–11 season.

Season	Winner
1980–81	Kent Nilsson
1981–82	Pat Riggin
1982–83	Lanny McDonald
1983–84	Rejean Lemelin
1984–85	Rejean Lemelin
1985–86	Hakan Loob
1986–87	Joe Mullen
1987–88	Hakan Loob
1988–89	Joe Mullen
1989–90	Joe Nieuwendyk

Season	Winner
1990–91	Theoren Fleury
1991–92	Mike Vernon
1992–93	Theoren Fleury
1993–94	Joe Nieuwendyk
1994–95	Trevor Kidd
1995–96	Theoren Fleury
1996–97	Trevor Kidd
1997–98	Theoren Fleury
1998–99	Fred Brathwaite
1999–00	Fred Brathwaite

Season	Winner
2000–01	Jarome Iginla
2001–02	Jarome Iginla
2002–03	Jarome Iginla
2003–04	Jarome Iginla
2005–06	Miikka Kiprusoff
2006–07	Miikka Kiprusoff
2007–08	Jarome Iginla
2008–09	Miikka Kiprusoff
2009–10	Miikka Kiprusoff
2010–11	Jarome Iginla

==== Winnipeg Jets ====
Season	Winner
1979–80	Morris Lukowich
1980–81	Dave Christian
1981–82	Dale Hawerchuk
1982–83	Dale Hawerchuk
1983–84	Laurie Boschman
1984–85	Dale Hawerchuk

Season	Winner
1985–86	Dale Hawerchuk
1986–87	Dale Hawerchuk
1987–88	Dale Hawerchuk
1988–89	Thomas Steen
1989–90	Thomas Steen
1990–91	Bob Essensa

Season	Winner
1991–92	Phil Housley
1992–93	Teemu Selanne
1993–94	Keith Tkachuk
1994–95	Alexei Zhamnov
1995–96	Nikolai Khabibulin

== See also ==
- Three stars (ice hockey)
- Three-Star Award (Arizona Coyotes award)
- Three Stars Awards (Boston Bruins award)
- Three Stars Award (Columbus Blue Jackets award)
- Normandy Homes Star of the Game Award (Dallas Stars award)
- Three-Star Award (New Jersey Devils award)
- Toyota Cup (Philadelphia Flyers award)
- A. T. Caggiano Memorial Booster Club Award (Pittsburgh Penguins award)
- O'Keefe Cup (defunct Quebec Nordiques award)
- Three Stars of the Year (San Jose Sharks award)
- Three Stars of the Game Award (Winnipeg Jets award)
