= Jarome Iginla =

Canadian ice hockey player (born 1977)

- Hockey Hall of Fame, 2020
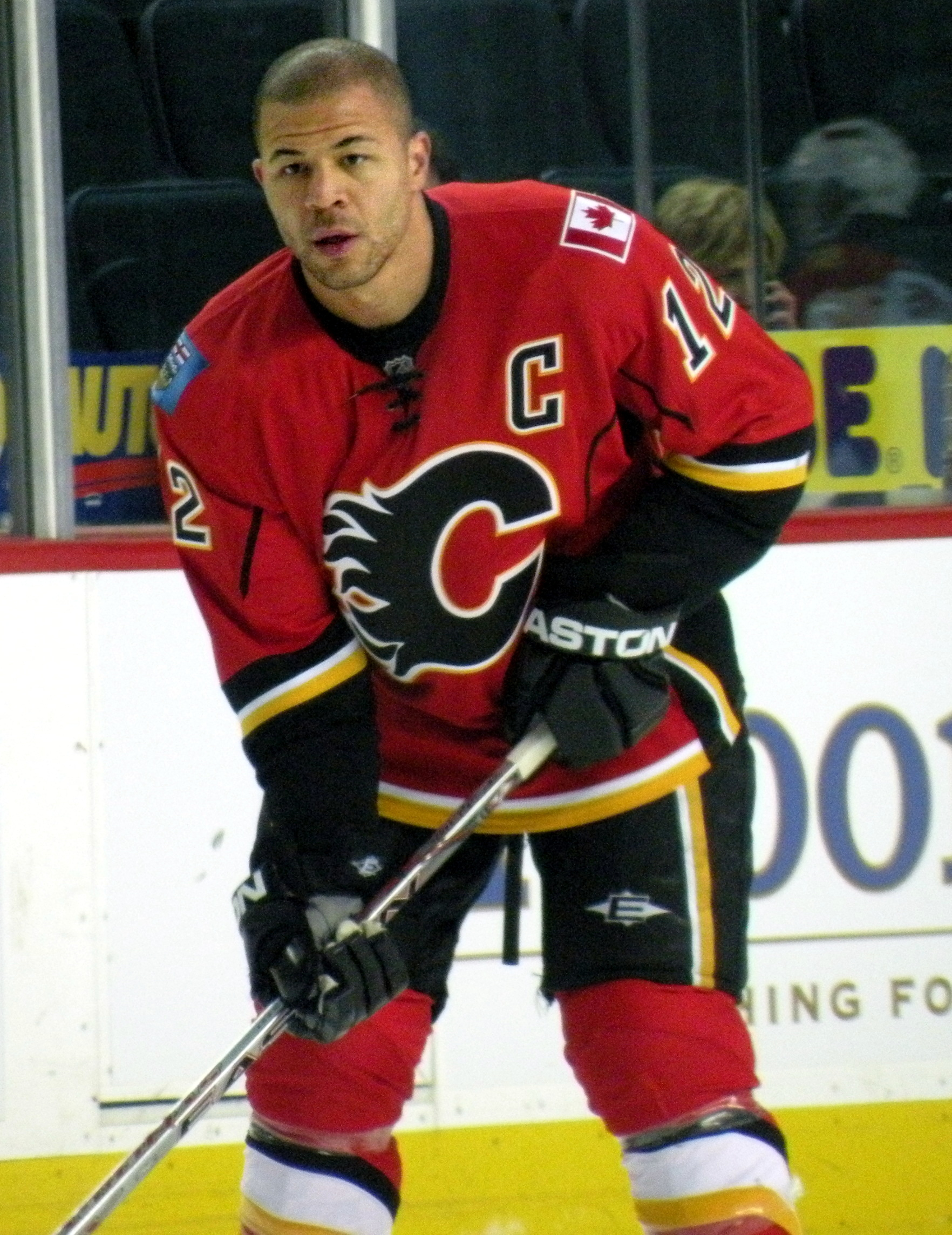
- Iginla with the Calgary Flames in 2008
- Born: July 1, 1977 (age 49) Edmonton, Alberta, Canada
- Height: 6 ft 1 in (185 cm)
- Weight: 210 lb (95 kg; 15 st 0 lb)
- Position: Right wing
- Shot: Right
- Played for: Calgary Flames; Pittsburgh Penguins; Boston Bruins; Colorado Avalanche; Los Angeles Kings
- National team: Canada
- NHL draft: 11th overall, 1995; Dallas Stars
- Playing career: 1996–2017

Jarome Arthur-Leigh Adekunle Tig Junior Elvis Iginla (/dʒəˈroʊm ɪˈɡɪnlə/; born July 1, 1977) is a Canadian former professional ice hockey player. He played over 1,500 games as a winger in the National Hockey League (NHL) for the Calgary Flames, Pittsburgh Penguins, Boston Bruins, Colorado Avalanche, and Los Angeles Kings between 1996 and 2017. He is widely regarded as one of the best players of his generation.

In junior, Iginla was a member of two Memorial Cup winning teams with the Kamloops Blazers and was named the Western Hockey League (WHL) Player of the Year in 1996. He was selected 11th overall by the Dallas Stars in the 1995 NHL entry draft but was traded to Calgary before making his NHL debut. Nicknamed "Iggy", he led the NHL in goals and points in 2001–02, and won the Lester B. Pearson Award as its most outstanding player as voted by the players. In 2003–04, Iginla led the league in goals for the second time and captained the Flames to the Stanley Cup Finals, leading the playoffs in goals.

A six-time NHL All-Star, Iginla is the Flames' all-time leader in goals, points, and games played, and is second in assists to Al MacInnis. Iginla scored 50 goals in a season on two occasions and is one of seven players in NHL history to score 30 goals in 11 consecutive seasons. He is one of 20 players in NHL history to score over 600 goals and is one of 34 players to record 1,300 points in his career. He is a past winner of the Mark Messier Leadership Award and has been recognized by both the Flames and the league for his community work; while a member of the Flames, Iginla donated $2,000 to the children's charity Kidsport for every goal he scored. His number 12 was retired by the Flames in 2019.

Internationally, Iginla has represented Canada on numerous occasions. He was a member of championship teams at the 1996 World Junior and 1997 World Championships as well as the 2004 World Cup of Hockey. He is a three-time Olympian and two-time gold medal winner, including at the 2002 Winter Olympics where he helped lead Canada to its first Olympic hockey championship in 50 years. Iginla was selected for the Hockey Hall of Fame in 2020.

== Early life ==
Iginla was born in Edmonton, Alberta, and raised in the adjoining city of St. Albert. His father, a lawyer, was originally from Nigeria and changed his first name from Adekunle to Elvis when he arrived in Canada. His surname means "big tree" in Yoruba, his father's native language. Iginla's mother, Susan Schuchard, is originally from Oregon, and has worked as a massage therapist and music teacher. Iginla was raised by his single mother, with support from his grandparents, after his parents divorced when he was two years old.

In addition to hockey, Iginla played baseball as a young man and was the catcher on the Canadian national junior team. Before hockey, baseball was Iginla's favourite sport and his earliest sports memories were of attending amateur baseball tournaments in Western Canada. He played baseball until he was about 17 years old and later in life told Sports Illustrated that he had hoped to become a two-sport professional athlete like Bo Jackson.

Iginla credits his grandfather for his hockey career, as with his mother working and father attending law school, he would not have had the opportunity to play sports at a high level if not for his grandfather's support. Iginla grew up admiring other Black hockey players, including Edmonton Oilers goaltender Grant Fuhr. Emulating Fuhr, Iginla played goaltender in his first two years of organized hockey before switching to the right wing. He played his entire minor hockey career in St. Albert, leading the Alberta Midget Hockey League in scoring as a 15-year-old with 87 points for the St. Albert Midget Raiders in 1992–93.

== Playing career ==
=== Junior ===
Iginla played three years with the Kamloops Blazers of the Western Hockey League (WHL). As a 16-year-old in 1993–94, he recorded six goals and 29 points in 48 regular season games before playing an additional 9 in the playoffs. The Blazers captured both the league title and the 1994 Memorial Cup, Canada's national junior championship. In reference to the Blazers' dominance of the league at the time (they had won their third WHL title in five seasons), Iginla described the expectations of success as being similar to those placed on the Montreal Canadiens, the NHL's most successful franchise: "When you put on a Blazers jersey, it's like putting on the Canadiens'. You've got to perform."

Iginla scored 33 goals and 71 points in 1994–95, his first full WHL season. The Blazers repeated as league champions, earning a trip to the 1995 Memorial Cup. Iginla scored five goals in the tournament to lead the Blazers to a second consecutive national championship. He received the George Parsons Trophy as the most sportsmanlike player of the tournament.

The Dallas Stars selected Iginla with their first pick, 11th overall, in the 1995 NHL entry draft; however, on December 20, 1995, they traded him to the Calgary Flames, along with Corey Millen, for the rights to forward Joe Nieuwendyk, who was then in a contract dispute with the Flames.

In his final season in Kamloops in 1995–96, Iginla finished fourth in the league scoring 136 points, including 63 goals in 63 games played, and was awarded the Four Broncos Memorial Trophy as the league's most outstanding player. The Blazers were upset in the Western Conference Final by the Spokane Chiefs, but Iginla still finished fourth in playoff scoring, recording 29 points in 16 games. His performance during the season earned him an invitation to play for Team Canada at the 1996 World Junior Ice Hockey Championships in Boston, where he led the tournament in scoring with 12 points and helped Canada to its fourth consecutive gold medal.

=== Professional (1996–2017) ===
==== Calgary Flames ====
Iginla made his NHL debut in the 1996 playoffs, as he was signed to a contract and flown to Calgary immediately after his junior season ended in Kamloops. He appeared in two games for the Flames in their series against the Chicago Blackhawks. In doing so, he became the first 18-year-old to play for the Flames since Dan Quinn in 1983. In his first NHL game, Iginla assisted on a Theoren Fleury goal to record his first point; he scored his first goal in his second game. He remained with the Flames, and played his first NHL season in 1996–97. He earned a spot on that year's NHL All-Rookie Team and finished as the runner-up to Bryan Berard in voting for the Calder Memorial Trophy as rookie of the year after leading all first-year players in scoring with 50 points.

By his third season, 1998–99, Iginla led the Flames in goals with 28. His success complicated negotiations for a new contract, as he and the Flames struggled to agree on a new deal following the season. Hoping to help resolve the contract impasse, Iginla agreed to attend training camp without a contract and purchased his insurance as the team would not have been responsible financially if he suffered an injury.

He remained without a contract at the start of the 1999–2000 season and missed the first three games as a holdout before signing a three-year deal worth US$4.9 million, plus bonuses. He finished the year with career highs in goals (29) and points (63).

He then topped both marks in 2000–01 by recording 31 goals and 71 points.

After participating in Canada's Olympic summer camp before the season, Iginla again set new personal highs in 2001–02 when he registered 52 goals and 96 points. This season elevated Iginla to superstar status. He earned the Art Ross and Maurice Richard trophies as the NHL's leading point and goal scorer, respectively. It marked the first time since 1980 that the Art Ross was not won by either Wayne Gretzky, Mario Lemieux, or Jaromír Jágr. He was also awarded the Lester B. Pearson Award as the league's most valuable player as voted by his peers, and was a nominee for both the Hart Memorial Trophy and the King Clancy Memorial Trophy. The Hart Trophy voting proved to be controversial: Iginla tied Canadiens goaltender José Théodore in voting points, but received fewer first-place votes than Théodore. However, one voter rumoured to be from Quebec—Théodore and the Canadiens' home province—inexplicably left Iginla off his ballot. As a result of the controversy that followed, the Professional Hockey Writers Association changed the rules on how its members voted for the award to prevent a recurrence.

There were fears Iginla would again hold out after his contract expired following the season. They were unfounded, however, as he signed a two-year, $13 million deal before the season and was looked on to again lead the Flames offensively. Iginla fell back to 67 points in 2002–03 as injuries, including a lingering finger dislocation following a fight, diminished his play. His 35 goals were still enough to lead the Flames for the fourth time in five seasons. Despite his offensive contributions, the Flames missed the playoffs.

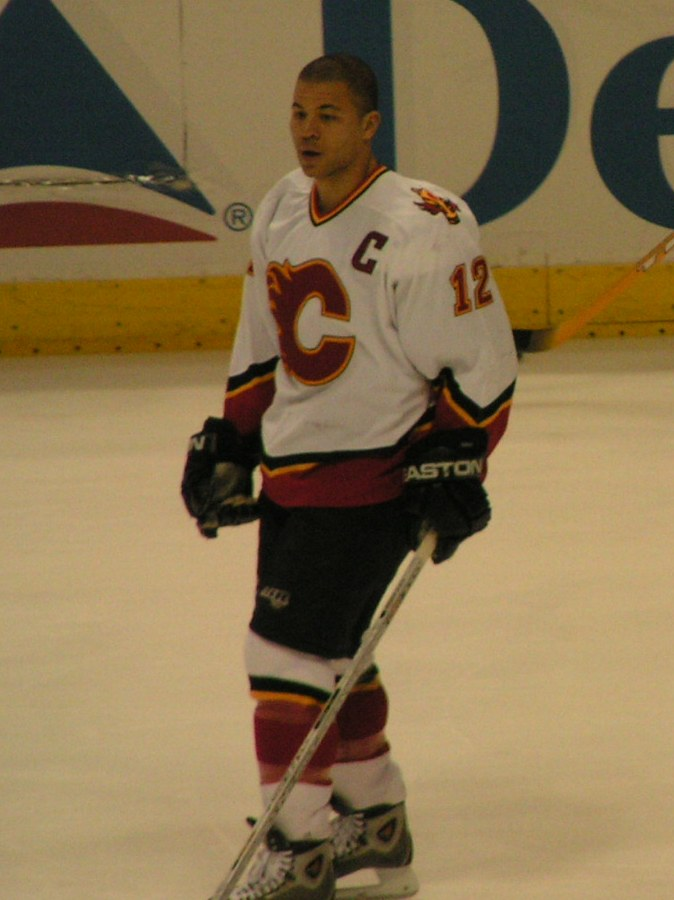
Iginla with the Flames in April 2004.

At the start of the 2003–04 season, Iginla was named the 18th captain in Flames franchise history, and 14th since the team moved to Calgary from Atlanta in 1980. His predecessor as captain, Craig Conroy, cited Iginla's experience and leadership for his decision to relinquish the captaincy. "He was a leader on that team and old enough to where he'd been there a long time. It was time for him. He took us to the Stanley Cup Finals that year so it worked out pretty well." Iginla was reported to be the first black captain in NHL history, though former Blackhawks captain Dirk Graham, who is of African descent, has also been said to hold that honour. Iginla responded to being named captain by capturing his second Rocket Richard Trophy, sharing the goal-scoring title with Ilya Kovalchuk and Rick Nash with 41 goals. The Flames qualified for the 2004 playoffs as the sixth seed in the West, the team's first playoff appearance in eight years. Iginla led all playoff scorers with 13 goals as he captained the Flames to their first Stanley Cup Finals appearance in 15 years. The Flames were unable to defeat the Tampa Bay Lightning, however, falling to the Eastern Conference champions in seven games after initially holding a 3–2 series lead. A dejected Iginla sat in the Flames locker room after game seven and was met by his father, who told his son that "I'm proud of you. All of Canada is proud of you."

While he was hailed as the best player in the world following his performance in the playoffs, Iginla spent the 2004–05 NHL lock-out focused on improving his game further. Following the lock-out, he was named as one of six player representatives on the newly created NHL competition committee, with a mandate to suggest recommendations for ways to improve the game. He held this position until early 2008.

On December 7, 2006, Iginla reached career milestones when he scored his 300th career goal and 600th career point against the Minnesota Wild. He was expected to play in the 2007 NHL All-Star Game in Dallas; however, he missed the game with a knee injury. The injury kept him out of 12 games in 2006–07. He nevertheless scored 94 points, including a career-high 55 assists.

I think it was a very classy thing to do. I think Jarome is one of the most classy players in the league, not only that, he's probably the best player in the league. When you have a captain like that, it was certainly a very classy move on their part, no doubt.

— Trevor Linden, after Iginla led a procession of Flames players in shaking Linden's hand following his final NHL game, April 5, 2008

The 2007–08 season saw Iginla post his second career 50-goal season, adding 48 assists for a career-high 98 points, good for third overall in the league. He was voted to the starting line-up of the 2008 NHL All-Star Game along with teammate Dion Phaneuf, and was named captain of the Western All-Star team. He broke the Flames' franchise record for games played when he played his 804th career game on November 29, 2007, against the Anaheim Ducks. He also broke Theoren Fleury's franchise record for goals when he scored his 365th on March 10, 2008, against the St. Louis Blues. Iginla was nominated as a Hart Trophy finalist for league most valuable player for the third time, though the award eventually was given to Washington Capitals winger Alexander Ovechkin. During the season, he signed a five-year contract extension with the Flames at $7 million per season.

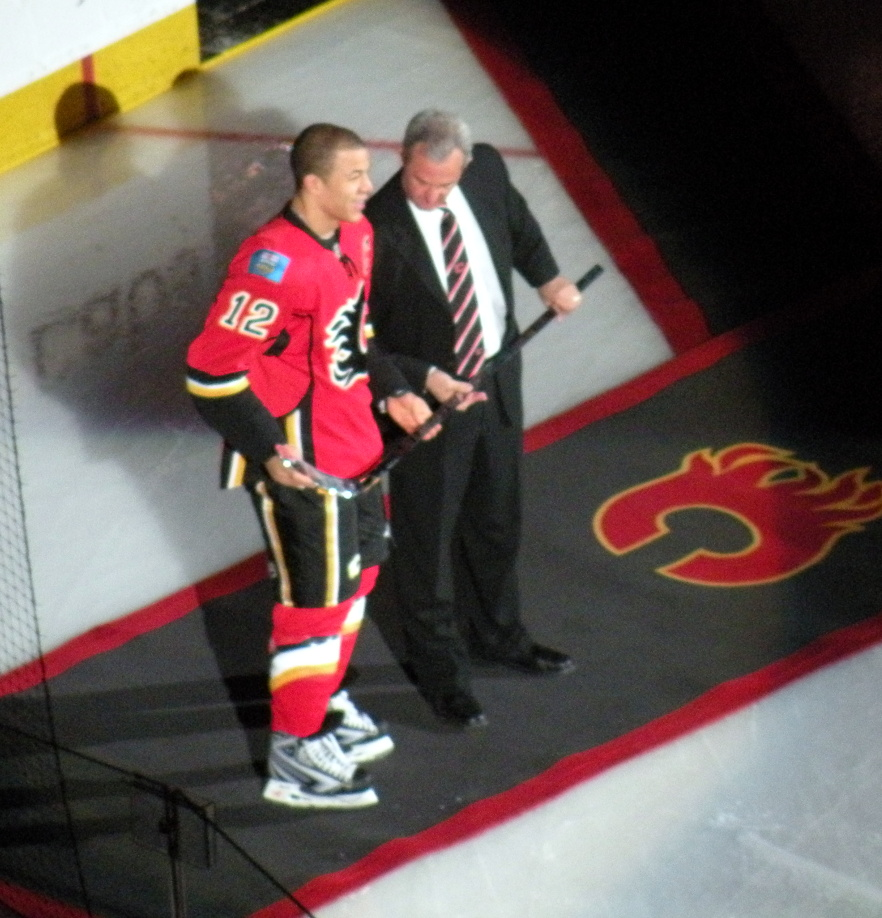
Iginla is presented with a silver stick in honour of his 400th NHL goal, March 2009.

Iginla continued his pursuit of Fleury's franchise record of 830 points in 2008–09. He recorded his 800th point with a first-period assist against the Chicago Blackhawks on December 19, 2008. He ended 2008 with a career-high five points in a New Year's Eve game against the Edmonton Oilers. He had 14 previous four-point games. In January, he was named to the 2009 NHL All-Star Game in Montreal, his fifth such selection. Representing the Western Conference, Iginla scored his first career NHL All-Star Game goal in a 12–11 shootout loss. He passed Fleury as the Flames' all-time scoring leader on March 1, 2009, by recording five points, including his 400th career goal, in an 8–6 loss to the Tampa Bay Lightning. He finished the season with 35 goals and 89 points, but a disappointing playoff performance that resulted in the Flames getting defeated in the first round by the Chicago Blackhawks in six games led to questions of whether he had been playing with an injury. Iginla quickly denied the rumour, admitted that he had not played with the level of consistency he expected and stated that he would spend the summer focused on improving his play in 2009–10. Iginla was named a Hart Trophy finalist for a second consecutive time and third time altogether, although it went to Ovechkin once more.

Iginla reached 900 career points in a two-goal, two-assist effort against the Edmonton Oilers on January 30, 2010. Six nights later, he played his 1,000th career game against the Florida Panthers. The Flames struggled in the 2009–10 campaign, failing to qualify for the playoffs for the first time since 2003, missing the 2010 playoffs by five points. Iginla accepted responsibility for the team's failure, admitting that finishing around 70 points for the season was "not enough". The Flames' declining fortunes and Iginla's season led to increasing questions on whether he could be traded from the team with whom he has played his entire NHL career. Iginla, who would have to approve any trade the team attempts to make due to a no-movement clause in his contract, expressed that he did not wish to leave Calgary, but would accommodate a trade if the Flames wished to do so. Former Flames' general manager Craig Button argued against trading Iginla, blaming a lack of complementary players for both Iginla and Calgary's failures: "There's nothing easier in hockey than to be able to shut down one player. And the Calgary Flames, I would argue, have made it really easy for teams to shut down Jarome." The Flames publicly stated that they had no plans to trade him.

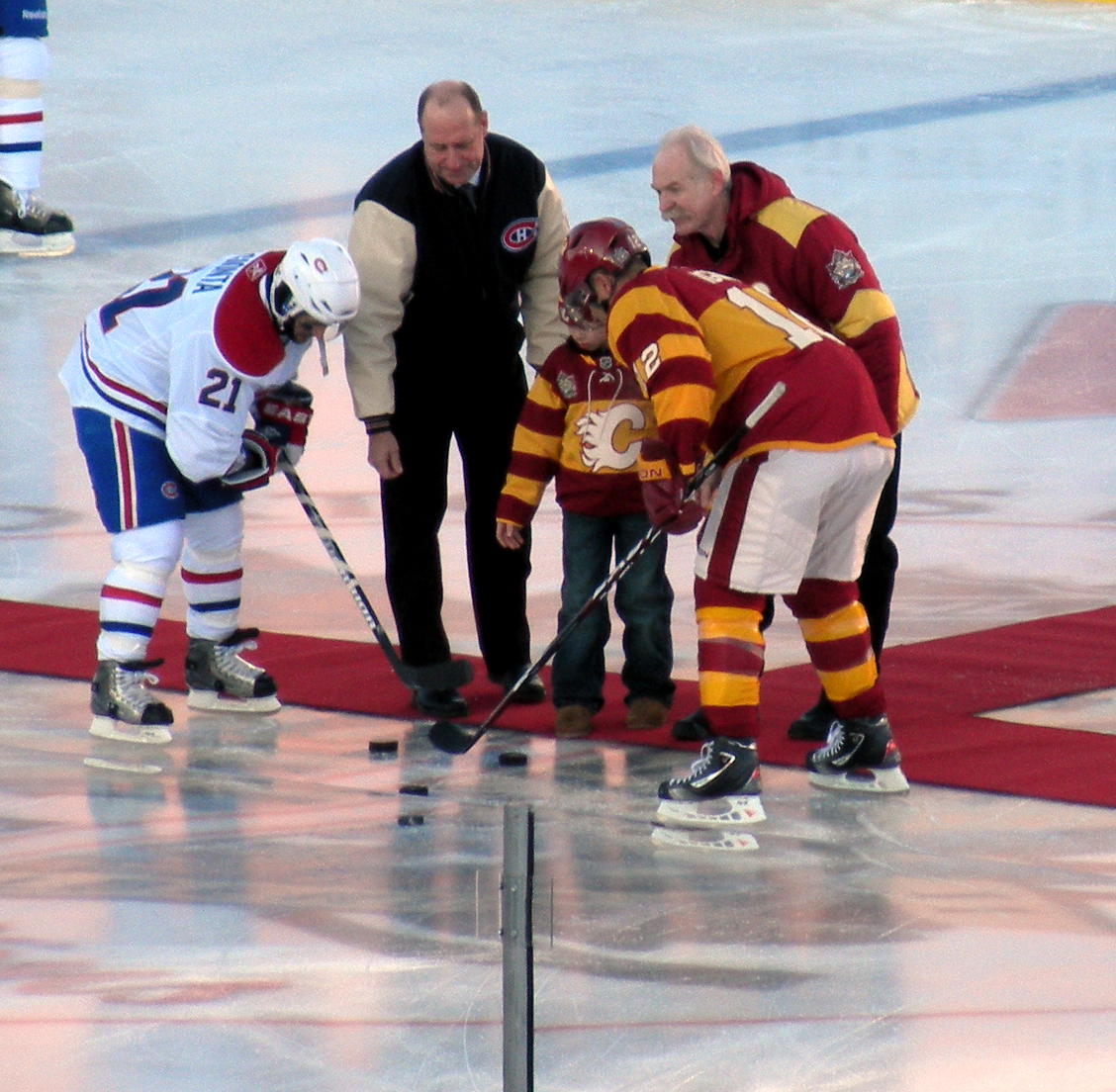
Iginla takes the ceremonial faceoff for the Flames during the 2011 Heritage Classic in February 2011

Iginla struggled offensively to begin the 2010–11 season, and with the Flames falling to the bottom of the standings, there was renewed speculation over his future in Calgary. Team management repeatedly reiterated that they were not interested in moving him to another team. Improving his game as the season wore on, Iginla reached another personal milestone, recording his 500th career assist on a goal by Jay Bouwmeester in a 6–5 loss to the Carolina Hurricanes on January 11, 2011, the same day he was named to play in his sixth All-Star Game. He announced a week and a half later that he had declined to play in the All-Star Game as he wished to spend the time with his ailing grandmother. Iginla scored his 30th goal of the season on a penalty shot against Pekka Rinne of the Nashville Predators on March 6, and in doing so became the 10th player in NHL history to score at least 30 goals in ten consecutive seasons. A month later, he scored his 1,000th career point, notching the game-winning goal against Jaroslav Halák of the St. Louis Blues in a 3–2 win on April 1. He ended the season with 43 goals and assists for 86 points in all 82 games as the Flames as a team improved compared to the previous year as they narrowly missed the playoffs, only missing by three points in the standings. His 43 goals was the most on the team and third in the league overall only behind the 45 goals from Steven Stamkos of the Tampa Bay Lightning and the 50 goals from Corey Perry of the Anaheim Ducks. His 86 points were also sixth in the league only behind the 91 points by the Lightning's Stamkos, 94 points by Vancouver Canucks centre and captain Henrik Sedin, 98 points by the Ducks' Perry, 99 points by Tampa Bay Lightning winger Martin St. Louis and the league-leading 104 points by Vancouver Canucks' winger Daniel Sedin, respectively.

Iginla scored his 500th goal on January 7, 2012, against Niklas Bäckström of the Minnesota Wild in a 3–1 victory. He was the 42nd player in league history to achieve the feat, and the 15th to do so with one organization. Midway through the 2011–12 season, Iginla was named an All-Star for the seventh time in his career (the sixth played), representing the Flames at the 2012 All-Star Game. Iginla scored his 30th goal of the 2011–12 season in a 3–2 win against goaltender Antti Niemi of the San Jose Sharks on March 13, 2012. He is the seventh player in league history to score 30 goals in 11 consecutive seasons.

==== Pittsburgh Penguins ====
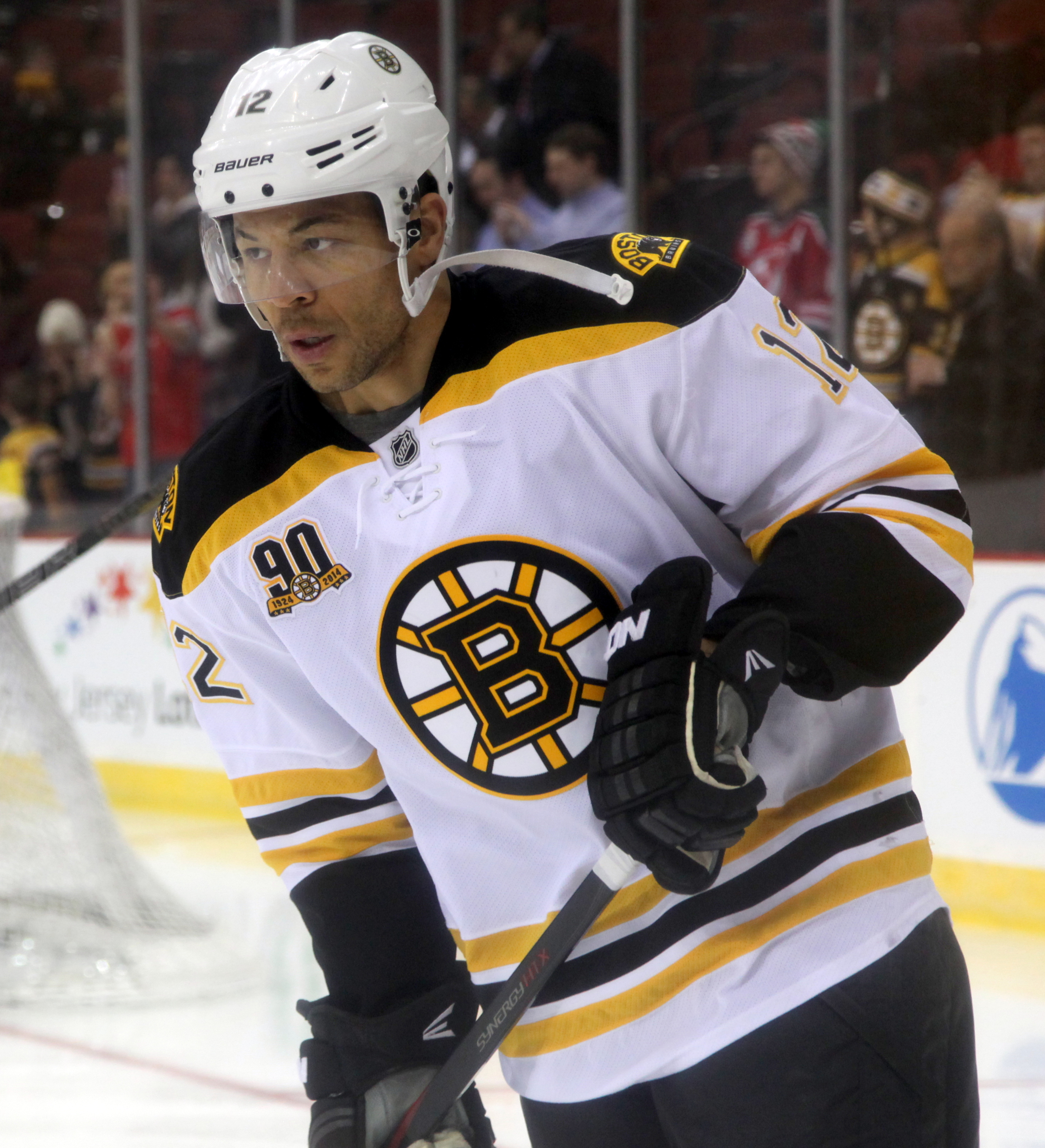
Iginla in March 2014 with the Boston Bruins

Playing the final year of his contract in 2012–13 and with the team languishing near the bottom of the NHL standings, speculation about Iginla's future in Calgary was again raised as April 3, 2013, trade deadline neared. National media outlets reported that Iginla, who had a clause in his contract preventing the Flames from moving him to another team without his permission, had given the organization a list of four teams he would be willing to accept a trade with: the Chicago Blackhawks, Los Angeles Kings, Boston Bruins, or Pittsburgh Penguins. Those four teams had won the last four championships and all four would go on to make the conference finals that season. The Bruins were considered the leading contender to acquire Iginla's services, and after he was held out of the line-up of Calgary's March 27, 2013, game against the Colorado Avalanche, it was reported that a trade between the two teams had been completed. Instead, Iginla's 16-year career in Calgary ended when he was sent to the Penguins in exchange for Pittsburgh's first round selection at the 2013 NHL entry draft and college prospects Kenny Agostino and Ben Hanowski. Iginla stated that playing with Sidney Crosby and Evgeni Malkin played a factor in his decision to move to the Penguins. The Bruins and Penguins met in the 2013 Eastern Conference Finals. Despite having the top-scoring offence in the league, the Penguins lost the series without winning a game. Iginla, along with Crosby, Malkin, James Neal and Kris Letang, registered a combined 0 points in the series. Iginla was moved to the third line after a 6–1 game 2 loss. Bruins forward Milan Lucic said after the series that Iginla's spurning of Boston ignited the series sweep: "When a guy chooses another team over your team, it does light a little bit of a fire underneath you."

==== Boston Bruins ====
As a free agent following the season, Iginla chose to go to Boston and signed a one-year, $6 million contract with the Bruins. He recorded nine games before scoring his first goal as a Bruin, as part of a 2–1 win over the San Jose Sharks, but later settled in on Boston's first line with Milan Lucic and David Krejčí. He made his first return to Calgary on December 10, 2013, where the fans greeted him with a long standing ovation prior to the game as the Flames played a video tribute. Following the contest, a 2–1 Bruins victory, Iginla was named the game's third star and took two laps around the rink to more cheers from the crowd. He recorded his 600th career assist on a Milan Lucic goal in a 3–1 victory over the Vancouver Canucks on February 4, 2014.

==== Colorado Avalanche ====
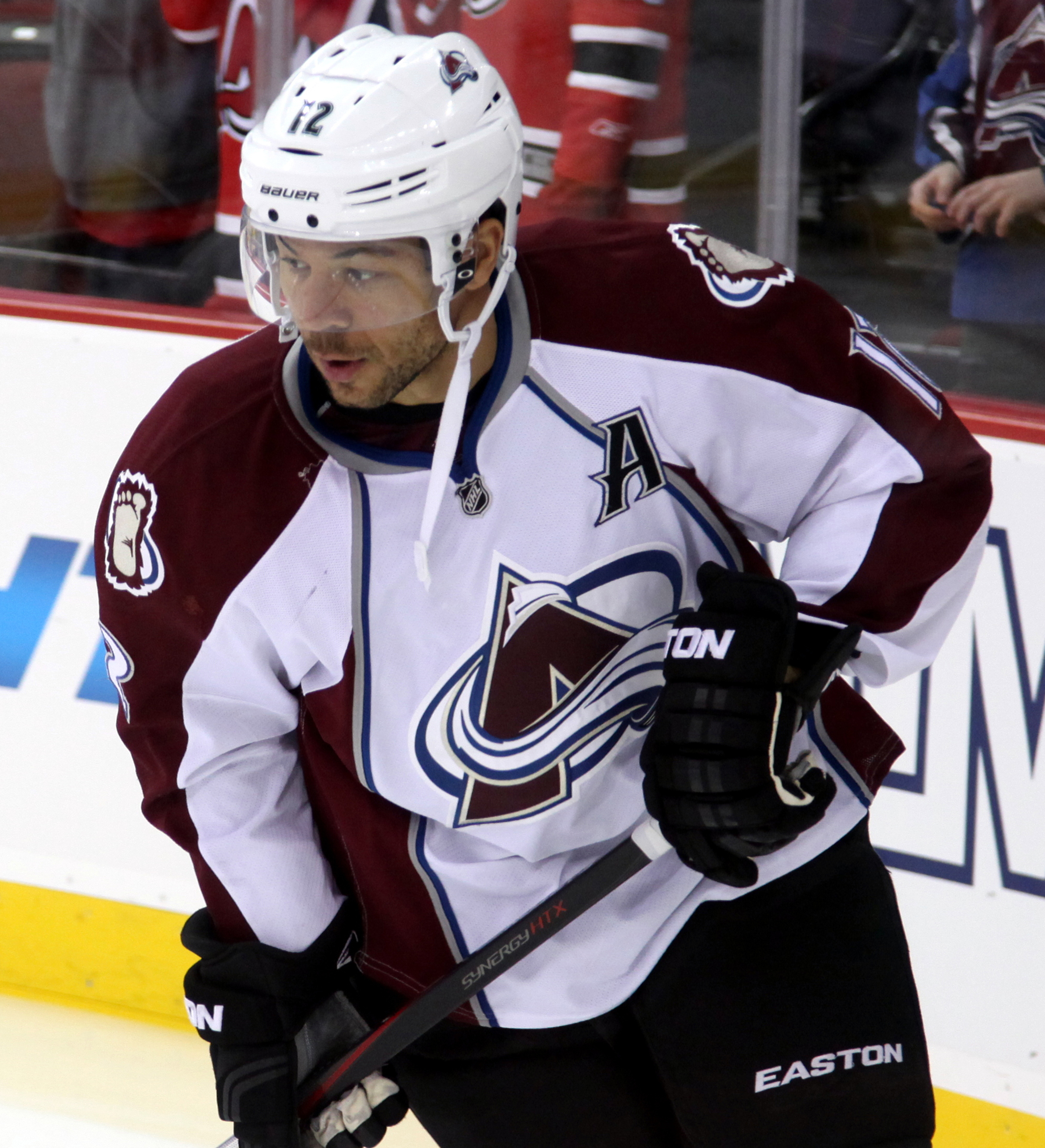
Iginla in November 2014. He played three seasons with the Avalanche.

Salary cap constraints prevented the Bruins from re-signing Iginla. Consequently, he left the team as a free agent and signed a three-year, $16 million contract with the Colorado Avalanche. The Avalanche disappointed in 2014–15; by mid-February, they stood in last place in the Central Division, though Iginla himself was among the team's leading scorers. He led the team with 29 goals, however, the Avalanche failed to qualify for the playoffs. On January 4, 2016, Iginla became the 19th player in NHL history to score 600 career goals. His milestone marker came in a 4–1 victory over the Los Angeles Kings. On December 10, 2016, Iginla played in his 1,500th NHL game, a 10–1 loss to the Montreal Canadiens. He is the 16th player to reach this milestone.

==== Los Angeles Kings ====
On March 1, 2017, Iginla was traded to the Los Angeles Kings for a 2018 conditional fourth-round pick. He chose to wear the number 88, as number 12 was already taken by Marián Gáborík. As a 10-year-old, Iginla had purchased a Kings jersey and placed his name and the number 88 on the back after Wayne Gretzky was traded to the team. Kings general manager Dean Lombardi hoped a fresh start for Iginla would ignite him after playing for a struggling team in Colorado.

Iginla was not re-signed by the Kings for the 2017–18 season. It was reported that he had hip surgery in the autumn of 2017, but that he hoped to make a return to the NHL when interviewed during a practice that he took part in with the Providence Bruins in February 2018.

On July 30, 2018, Iginla announced his retirement.

On June 24, 2020, Iginla was selected for the Hockey Hall of Fame, in his first year of eligibility.

== International play ==
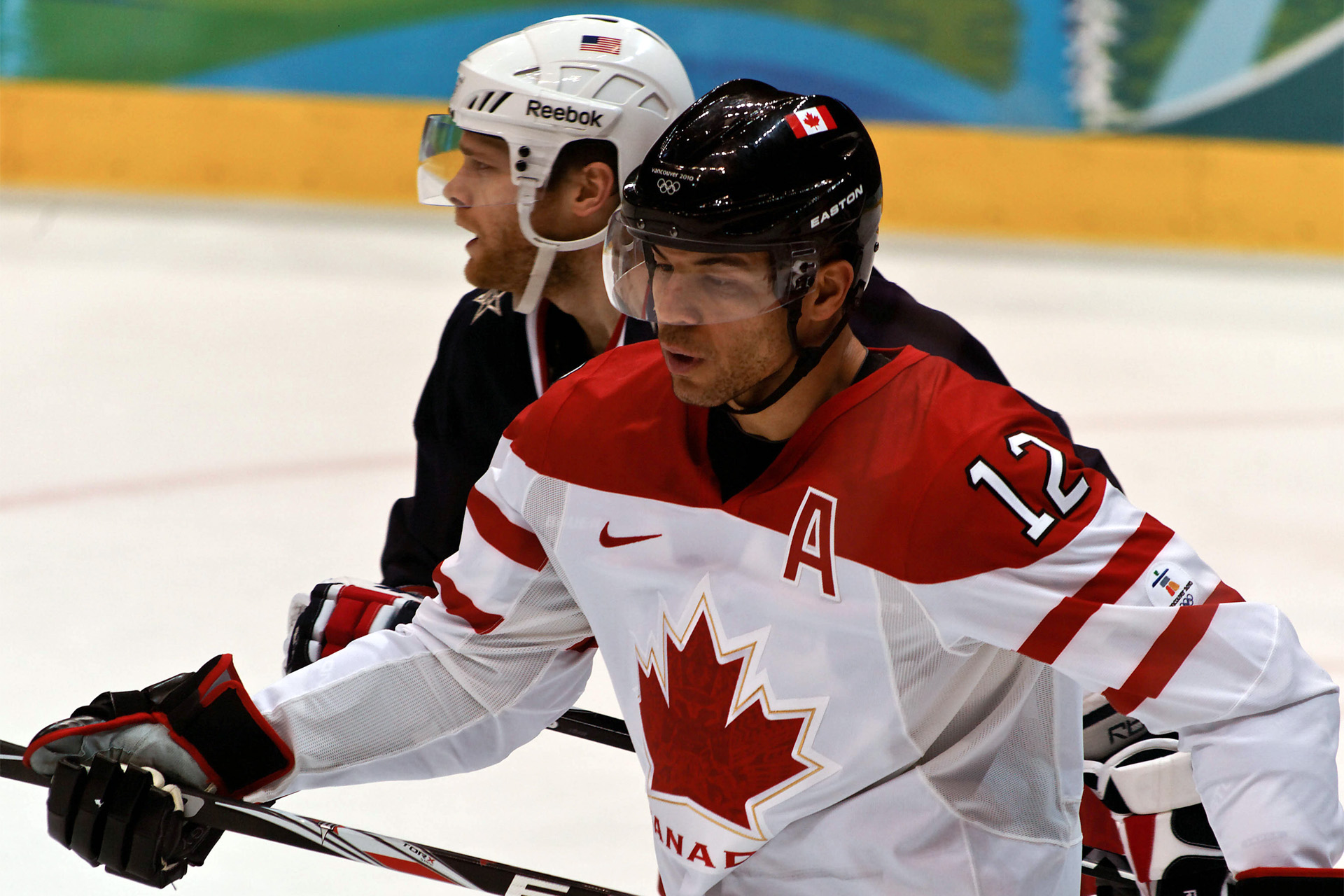
- Iginla won gold medals at the Olympics in 2002 and 2010.

Medal record

Representing Canada

Men's ice hockey

Olympic Games
Gold medal – first place	2002 Salt Lake City	
Gold medal – first place	2010 Vancouver	

World Championship
Gold medal – first place	1997 Finland	

World Cup
Gold medal – first place	2004 World Cup of Hockey	

World Junior Championship
Gold medal – first place	1996 USA	

Iginla first represented Canada at the 1994 Nations Cup, an unsanctioned tournament for players under the age of 18. He led Canada in scoring with five goals and nine points as it won the gold medal. Two years later, he joined the national junior team at the 1996 World Junior Ice Hockey Championships. He led the tournament in scoring with five goals and 12 points as Canada won its fourth consecutive gold medal. He was named an all-star and the tournament's top forward. One year later, Iginla played in his first tournament with the senior team, competing at the 1997 World Championships as a 19-year-old, the youngest player on the team. He recorded two goals and three assists in 11 games as Canada won the gold medal.

A late invitation to join Team Canada's summer camp in preparation for the 2002 Winter Olympics helped Iginla emerge as a star player. He was so surprised by the invitation he initially thought one of his Calgary Flames teammates were playing a prank on him. He scored two goals in the gold medal game, a 5–2 victory over the United States, as Canada won its first Olympic gold medal in 50 years. With this win, Iginla became the first Black man to win a gold medal at the Winter Olympics. Iginla also represented Canada at the 2004 World Cup of Hockey as an alternate captain, playing on a line with Joe Sakic and Mario Lemieux. Canada won the gold medal.

Iginla participated in his second Olympics and was an alternate captain at the 2006 Turin games, recording three points in six games. The Canadians were unable to defend their 2002 gold medal, losing to Russia in the quarter-finals. Named an alternate captain once again for the 2010 team in Vancouver, he opened the tournament with a hat trick against Norway. He finished as the tournament leader with five goals, and assisted on Sidney Crosby's overtime winning goal in the gold medal final against the United States.

== Playing style ==
In his prime, Iginla was considered to be one of the NHL's most prominent power forwards. Upon entering the league, he tried to emulate players like Brendan Shanahan and Keith Tkachuk, hoping to match their combination of finesse and physicality. He was one of the most consistent scorers in the league; between 1998 and 2008, only Jaromír Jágr scored more NHL goals than Iginla. Even so, scouting reports have argued that Iginla's lack of speed makes it easier for opponents to isolate him and restrict his ability to move if his teammates rely on him too much to lead the offence.

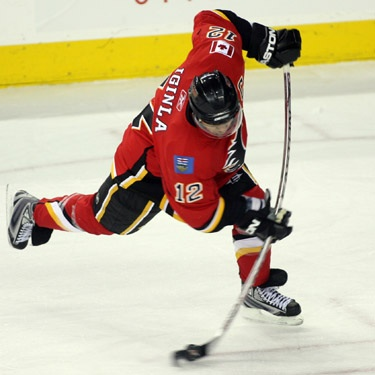
Iginla taking a shot.

The abuse he faced at the hands of opponents early in his NHL career prompted Iginla's coaches to work at developing his physical play. While he was not enthusiastic about fighting, Iginla accepted then head coach Brian Sutter's arguments that he needed to adopt a more aggressive style to improve as a player. Iginla was most effective when he had room to manoeuvre, and to create that space, he had to intimidate his opponents. "You've got a power forward who does it all," said Craig Conroy. "I mean, he'll fight, and hit, and score goals. Maybe it's not the end-to-end rushes, but he does all those little things that win games and get things done." His opponents also respect his play. Rob Blake said that while Iginla is not known for fancy play, "he'll run you over. Or he'll fight somebody. And then he'll score a goal. He does pretty much everything you'd want a guy to do."

Iginla recorded several Gordie Howe hat tricks – a fight, a goal and an assist in the same game – and as it is not an official statistic, The Hockey News estimated that as of 2012, he was the active leader with nine. His fights, including one with Tampa Bay Lightning star Vincent Lecavalier in the 2004 Stanley Cup Finals, have had a motivating effect on his play and that of his teammates. Iginla suffered injuries as a result of his fighting, including a broken hand from a 2003 fight with Bill Guerin of the Dallas Stars. Iginla's truculent style of play gained approval from hockey commentator Don Cherry. In 2008 during a ceremonial handshake initiated by Iginla to Trevor Linden in his last game, Linden told Iginla he was the best player in the game at that time.

He commands the respect of his peers and has been known to stand up to the coaching staff to defend a fellow player. Former teammate Andrew Ference — a former Bruins player himself, before Iginla's arrival on the Boston team's roster — once described following Iginla as like "following a friend." Preferring to lead by example, Iginla is not regarded as a vocal captain. He likes to speak with players individually and tries to ensure that all of his teammates are comfortable. He was named the recipient of the Mark Messier Leadership Award in 2009.

== Personal life ==
Iginla married his high school sweetheart Kara. The couple have three children: daughter Jade and sons Tij and Joe. They had been dating since they were in grade eight. Jade attended and played hockey for Shattuck-Saint Mary's and Kelowna's RINK Hockey Academy, before attending Brown University and playing for the Brown Bears in the NCAA. Internationally, she has represented Canada at the under-18 level. Tij currently plays for the Kelowna Rockets and was the first-ever draft selection for the Utah Mammoth, after he was drafted sixth overall in the 2024 NHL entry draft. Joe played for Kelowna’s RINK Hockey Academy, with Jarome as his head coach, played for the Edmonton Oil Kings having been taken by them in the first round of the 2023, WHL Bantam Draft, and now plays for the Vancouver Giants.

Iginla has four paternal half-siblings; two brothers, Jason and Stephen, and two sisters, Theresa and Elizabeth. Theresa played for the University of Saskatchewan Huskies women's hockey team for three seasons from 2004 to 2007. Jarome is an avid golfer and a regular participant in the Calgary Flames Celebrity Charity Golf Classic.

Iginla is a Christian. The most notable quote regarding his faith was “I believe He died for us, and I believe He’s there for us and we can lean on Him. And I do.”

Iginla is well known for his kind-hearted nature. Former Flames General manager Craig Button described Iginla as being grounded: "He doesn't carry himself with any attitude or arrogance. He's confident in his abilities. He's self-assured. He's genuine. He's a better person than he is a player, and we all know what kind of player he is." In 2002, while in Salt Lake City for the Winter Olympic Games, Iginla struck up a conversation with four Calgarians sitting next to his table and found out they were sleeping in their car outside of the hotel. He excused himself from the conversation, and booked them accommodations at his own expense at the hotel his family was staying in.

Since 2002, he has operated the Jarome Iginla Hockey School in Calgary as a non-profit organization, donating proceeds to the Diabetes Research Association. In 2004, he was awarded the NHL Foundation Player Award for his community service and the King Clancy Memorial Trophy in recognition of his humanitarian contributions. Iginla supports many charities. In 2000, he began donating $1,000 per goal he scored to KidSport, a figure he doubled to $2,000 in 2005. Between 2000 and 2013, he donated more than $700,000 from this initiative.

Iginla is a part owner of the Kamloops Blazers of the Western Hockey League, for whom he played during his junior hockey days. He purchased a minority share in the franchise, along with fellow NHL players Shane Doan, Mark Recchi and Darryl Sydor, in October 2007. He is also an ambassador with the NHL Diversity program, which supports youth hockey organizations that offer economically disadvantaged children the opportunity to play. Since 2008, he has been a hockey spokesperson for Scotiabank, appearing in commercials and at events supporting its grassroots hockey programs, as well as for Samsung Canada.

He was the cover athlete and spokesperson for the EA Sports video game NHL 2003.

Since retiring, Iginla has resided in Chestnut Hill, Massachusetts and Lake Country, British Columbia.

In November 2026, Iginla revealed that he was suffering from some neurological issues, potentially from metals being absorbed into his bloodstream after a recent hip replacement surgery to try and ameliorate the wear and tear from his playing career.

== Career statistics ==
=== Regular season and playoffs ===
			Regular season					Playoffs
Season	Team	League	GP	G	A	Pts	PIM	GP	G	A	Pts	PIM
1993–94	Kamloops Blazers	WHL	48	6	23	29	33	19	3	6	9	10
1994–95	Kamloops Blazers	WHL	72	33	38	71	111	21	7	11	18	34
1995–96	Kamloops Blazers	WHL	63	63	73	136	120	16	16	13	29	44
1995–96	Calgary Flames	NHL	—	—	—	—	—	2	1	1	2	0
1996–97	Calgary Flames	NHL	82	21	29	50	37	—	—	—	—	—
1997–98	Calgary Flames	NHL	70	13	19	32	29	—	—	—	—	—
1998–99	Calgary Flames	NHL	82	28	23	51	58	—	—	—	—	—
1999–00	Calgary Flames	NHL	77	29	34	63	26	—	—	—	—	—
2000–01	Calgary Flames	NHL	77	31	40	71	62	—	—	—	—	—
2001–02	Calgary Flames	NHL	82	52	44	96	77	—	—	—	—	—
2002–03	Calgary Flames	NHL	75	35	32	67	49	—	—	—	—	—
2003–04	Calgary Flames	NHL	81	41	32	73	84	26	13	9	22	45
2005–06	Calgary Flames	NHL	82	35	32	67	86	7	5	3	8	11
2006–07	Calgary Flames	NHL	70	39	55	94	40	6	2	2	4	12
2007–08	Calgary Flames	NHL	82	50	48	98	83	7	4	5	9	2
2008–09	Calgary Flames	NHL	82	35	54	89	37	6	3	1	4	0
2009–10	Calgary Flames	NHL	82	32	37	69	56	—	—	—	—	—
2010–11	Calgary Flames	NHL	82	43	43	86	40	—	—	—	—	—
2011–12	Calgary Flames	NHL	82	32	35	67	43	—	—	—	—	—
2012–13	Calgary Flames	NHL	31	9	13	22	22	—	—	—	—	—
2012–13	Pittsburgh Penguins	NHL	13	5	6	11	9	15	4	8	12	16
2013–14	Boston Bruins	NHL	78	30	31	61	47	12	5	2	7	12
2014–15	Colorado Avalanche	NHL	82	29	30	59	42	—	—	—	—	—
2015–16	Colorado Avalanche	NHL	82	22	25	47	41	—	—	—	—	—
2016–17	Colorado Avalanche	NHL	61	8	10	18	54	—	—	—	—	—
2016–17	Los Angeles Kings	NHL	19	6	3	9	16	—	—	—	—	—
NHL totals			1,554	625	675	1,300	1,040	81	37	31	68	98

=== International ===
Year	Team	Event	Result	GP	G	A	Pts	PIM
1996	Canada	WJC	1st place, gold medalist(s)	6	5	7	12	4
1997	Canada	WC	1st place, gold medalist(s)	11	2	3	5	2
2002	Canada	OG	1st place, gold medalist(s)	6	3	1	4	0
2004	Canada	WCH	1st place, gold medalist(s)	6	2	1	3	2
2006	Canada	OG	7th	6	2	1	3	4
2010	Canada	OG	1st place, gold medalist(s)	7	5	2	7	0
Junior totals				6	5	7	12	4
Senior totals				36	14	8	22	8

== Awards and honours ==
National Hockey League
Award	Year	Ref.
NHL All-Rookie Team	1997
First team All-Star	2002, 2008, 2009
NHL All-Star Game	2003, 2004, 2008, 2009, 2011, 2012
Maurice "Rocket" Richard Trophy; Leading goal scorer	2002, 2004
Art Ross Trophy; Leading point scorer	2002
Lester B. Pearson Award; Most Outstanding Player as voted by the players	2002
Second team All-Star	2004
King Clancy Memorial Trophy; Leadership and humanitarian contributions	2004
NHL Foundation Player Award commitment, perseverance and teamwork in the community	2004
NHL 2000s All-Decade First Team	2009
Mark Messier Leadership Award	2009
Hockey Hall of Fame	2020

International
Award	Year	Ref.
World Junior first All-Star team	1996
World Junior Best Forward	1996

Junior
Award	Year	Ref.
Memorial Cup Championship team	1994, 1995
George Parsons Trophy; Most sportsmanlike player of the Memorial Cup	1995
WHL West first All-Star team	1996
Four Broncos Memorial Trophy; WHL player of the year	1996
CHL first All-Star team	1996

Team awards
Award	Year	Ref.
Molson Cup; CGY – Most three star selections	2001, 2002, 2003, 2004, 2008, 2011
Ralph T. Scurfield Humanitarian Award; CGY – Humanitarian contributions	2001, 2002
J. R. McCaig Award; CGY – Respect, courtesy and compassion	2008

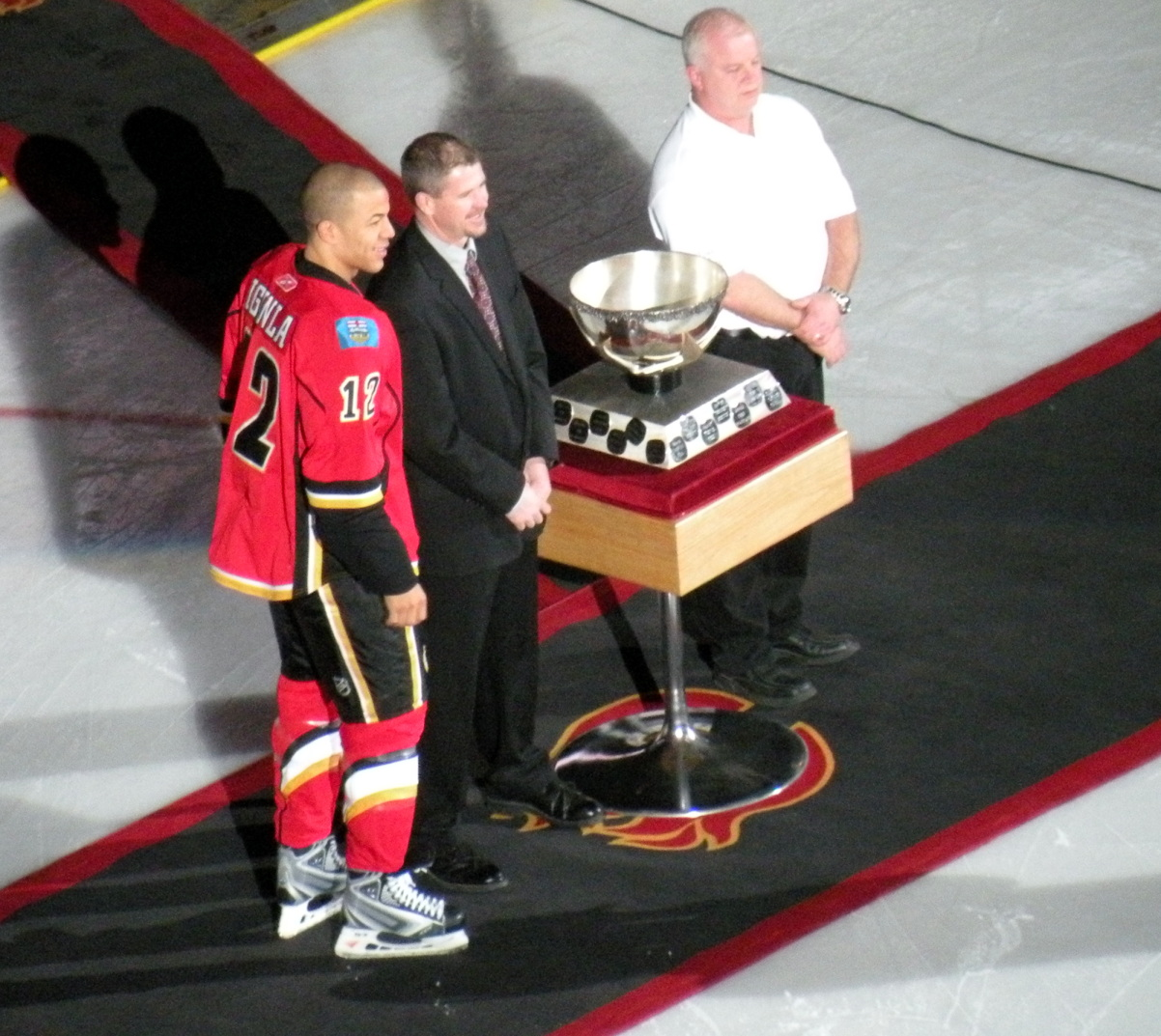
Iginla being honoured as part of a Molson Cup ceremony

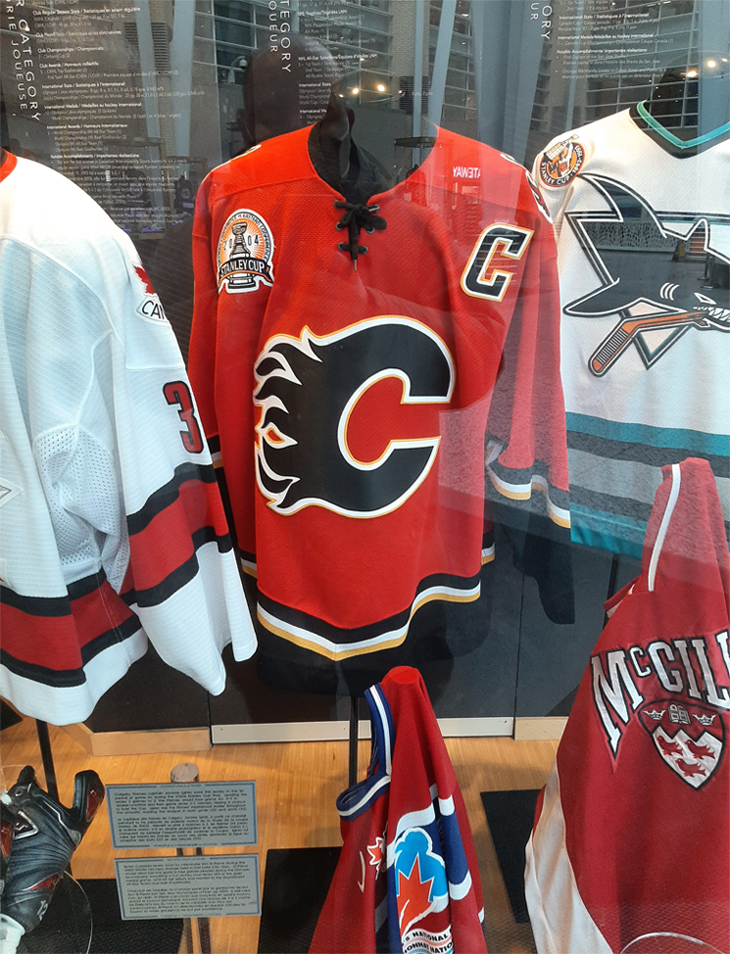
Iginla's sweater used during game 6 of the 2004 Stanley Cup Finals at the Hockey Hall of Fame.

== See also ==
- List of Black NHL players
- List of NHL statistical leaders

Sporting positions
Preceded by Craig Conroy	Calgary Flames captain 2003–13	Succeeded by Mark Giordano
Awards and achievements
Preceded by Jason Botterill	Dallas Stars first-round draft pick 1995	Succeeded by Ric Jackman
Preceded by Marty Murray	Winner of the Four Broncos Memorial Trophy; 1996	Succeeded by Peter Schaefer
Preceded by Jaromír Jágr	Winner of the Art Ross Trophy; 2002	Succeeded by Peter Forsberg
Preceded by Pavel Bure; Milan Hejduk	Winner of the Rocket Richard Trophy; 2002; 2004	Succeeded by Milan Hejduk; Jonathan Cheechoo
Preceded by Joe Sakic	Winner of the Lester B. Pearson Award; 2002	Succeeded by Markus Näslund
Preceded by Brendan Shanahan	Winner of the King Clancy Memorial Trophy; 2004	Succeeded by Olaf Kölzig
