= Three stars (ice hockey) =

Players of the game awards

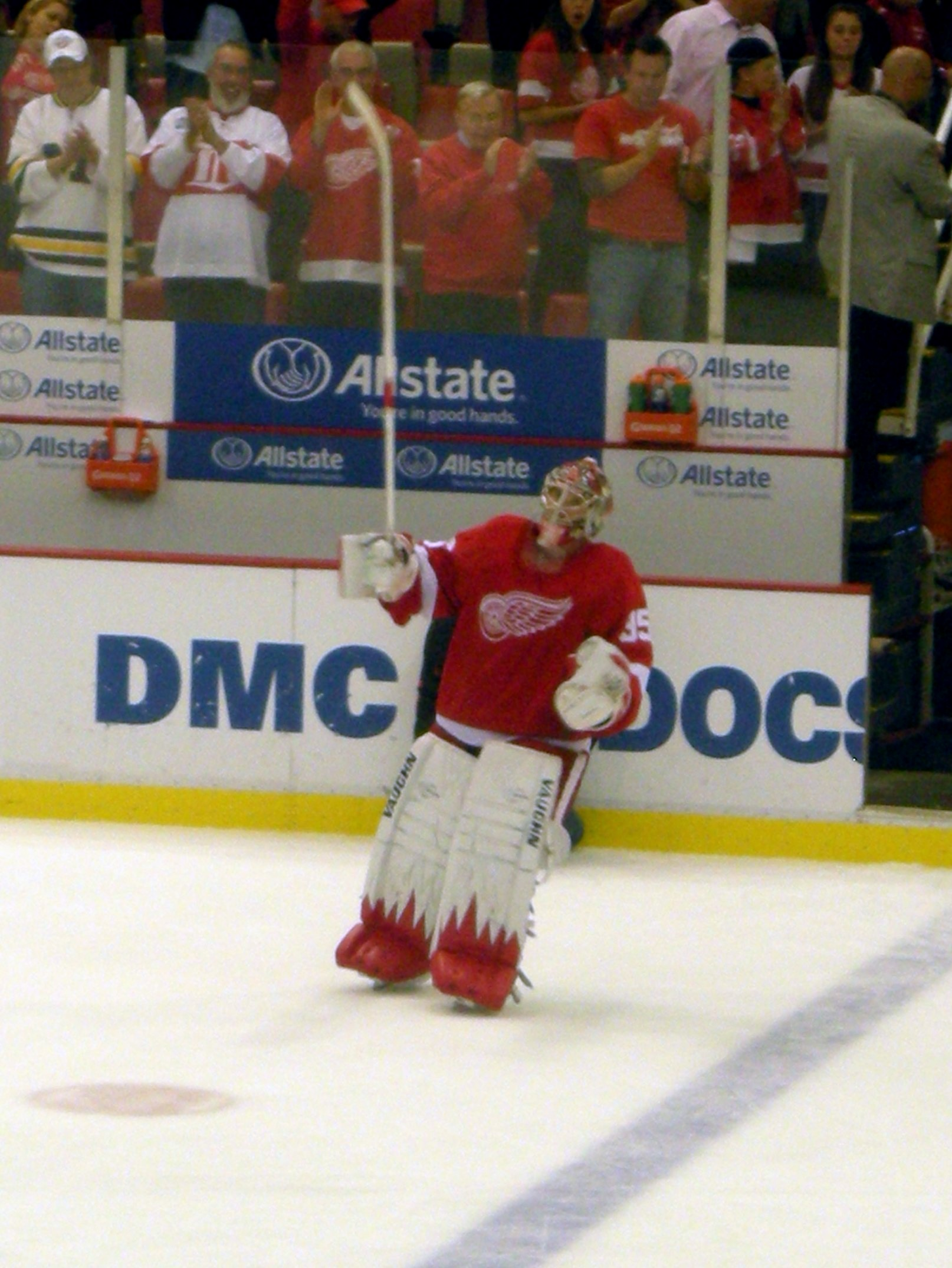
Jimmy Howard recognized as the second star after recording a shutout in an October 2010 game against the Anaheim Ducks.

The three stars (French: trois étoiles) in ice hockey are the three best players in a game, with the "first star" considered the best of the three players, akin to the player of the match in other sports. Media representatives of the home team choose the three stars, who are usually the top point scorers or outstanding goaltenders from either team.

== Usage ==
The three stars of the game in hockey was created in a collaboration between the Toronto Maple Leafs and an advertising agency. The tradition began with a handshake agreement between Conn Smythe, then-owner of the Toronto Maple Leafs, and Jack MacLaren. In addition, it was seen as a way to promote the game's best stars of the time. After the sponsorship ended in 1976, the tradition remained on the Canadian Broadcasting Corporation's flagship hockey show, Hockey Night In Canada (HNIC).

The usage of three stars has since expanded greatly. All professional hockey teams (or radio/television broadcasts of those teams) in North America award three stars at the end of each game, and many amateur and collegiate leagues (or broadcasts of their games) do as well. The National Hockey League awards three stars during every game, in both the regular season and Stanley Cup playoffs, and not just limited to those shown on HNIC. Media representatives of the home team make the selections. It also awards a nightly set of three stars, which are the three best players out of all who played a game in the league on a given night. Also, in the 2007–08 NHL season, the previous awards of "offensive player of the week" and "defensive player of the week" were replaced by the "three stars of the week", while the similar awards of "offensive player of the month" and "defensive player of the month" were replaced by the "three stars of the month".

The NHL also has a system which awards points to its nightly three stars: 30 points to the first star, 20 points to the second, and 10 to the third. It keeps a running tally of the number of points each player has been awarded. NHL teams may use these standings; for example, the Vancouver Canucks award a sum to a charity chosen by its player who earned the highest number of points that month. The Molson Cup is also awarded to the top point-earner of the year of each Canadian team.

Despite its popularity in North America, three stars are generally not awarded during international play, such as at the Winter Olympic Games. The IIHF World Championships and World Junior Championships instead issue awards such as "Best Player" for each team per game, or the overall best player per position over the course of the tournament.

=== Unusual selections ===
The three star selections for a game, being a "fun" statistic, do not ordinarily affect any other aspect of the game. As such, there have been instances in which the three stars have been awarded in an unexpected way, often to recognize a single player's accomplishments.

On occasion, one player may be awarded all three stars.

- March 23, 1944, Maurice Richard of the Montreal Canadiens was given all three stars in game 2 of their 1944 semifinal matchup against the Toronto Maple Leafs following a 5-goal performance in a 5–1 victory.
- On April 13, 2014, Teemu Selänne of the Anaheim Ducks was awarded all three stars in honor of it being the last regular-season game of his career.
- On November 14, 2024, Connor McDavid was awarded all stars after reaching 1000 career points in the NHL.
- On April 6, 2025, Alexander Ovechkin of the Washington Capitals was simultaneously awarded all three stars for breaking Wayne Gretzky's longstanding total regular season goal record of 894 with his 895th career goal, despite losing to the New York Islanders 4–1.
- On June 7th, 2025, in game 5 of the 2025 ECHL Kelly Cup Finals, Trois-Rivières Lions goaltender Luke Cavallin was awarded all three stars in what would be the championship-winning game. Cavallin made 48 saves on 49 shots as the Lions would go on to win 4–1.

In even rarer instances, any of the three stars can even be awarded to a non-player. To honor his final game as the long-time broadcaster for the Chicago Blackhawks, Pat Foley was named the number one star of the Hawks' game against the San Jose Sharks on April 14, 2022.

== See also ==
- NHL All-Star team
- Toyota Cup, an award for Philadelphia Flyers players
- Molson Cup, an award for players on Canadian hockey teams
