= Babe Pratt Trophy =

Ice hockey award

The Walter "Babe" Pratt Trophy is an annual award presented to the best defenceman on the Vancouver Canucks of the National Hockey League (NHL). One of six annual team awards presented to Canucks players, it is voted by the team fans and is presented at the last home game of the regular season. The most recent recipient is Filip Hronek, who won the award in the 2025–26 season.

== History ==
The trophy was first awarded for the 1972–73 season as the Premier's Trophy. After the death of Hall of Fame defenceman and Canucks goodwill ambassador Babe Pratt, the trophy was renamed in honour of him for the 1989–90 season. Originally, the trophy's recipient was decided by local media, but is now decided by a fan vote.

The most prolific award winners in trophy's history have been:

- Quinn Hughes – 6 times (2020, 2021, 2022, 2023, 2024, 2025)
- Mattias Ohlund – 4 times (1998, 2000, 2004, 2006)
- Jyrki Lumme – 4 times (1992, 1994, 1996, 1997)
- Doug Lidster – 4 times (1985, 1986, 1987, 1991)
- Harold Snepsts – 4 times (1978, 1979, 1980, 1982)
- Alexander Edler – 3 times (2012, 2018, 2019)
- Ed Jovanovski – 3 times (2001, 2002, 2003)

== Winners ==
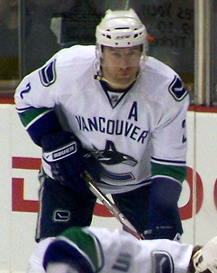
Four-time winner Mattias Ohlund (1998, 2000, 2004, 2006).

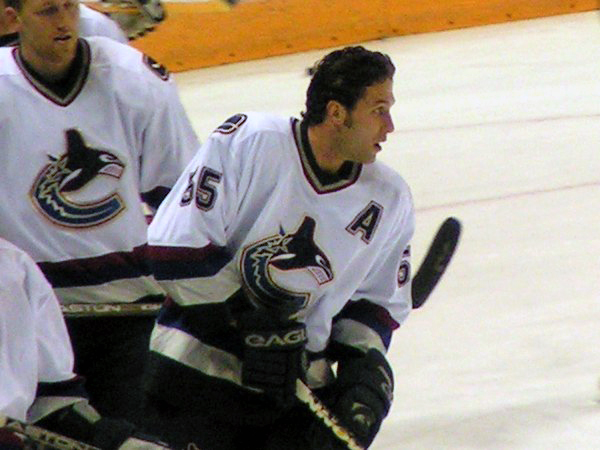
Three-time winner Ed Jovanovski (2001 to 2003).

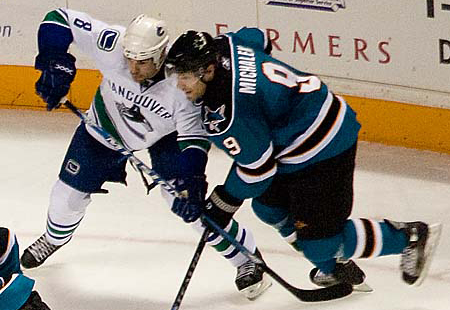
Two-time winner Willie Mitchell (2008, 2009).

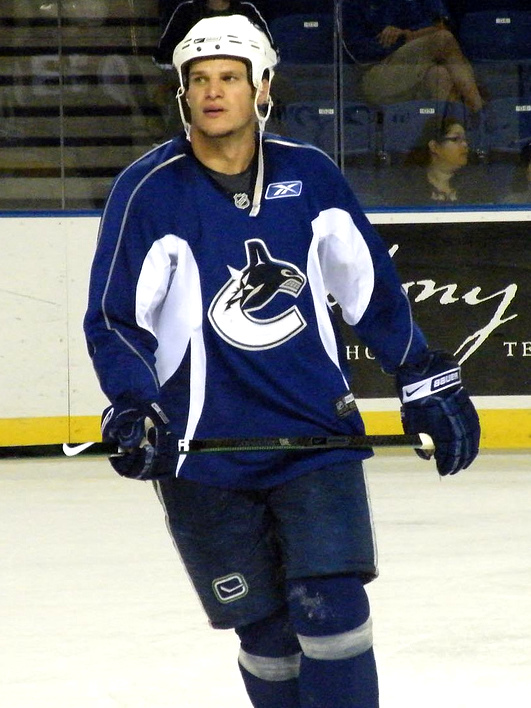
Kevin Bieksa won in 2007.

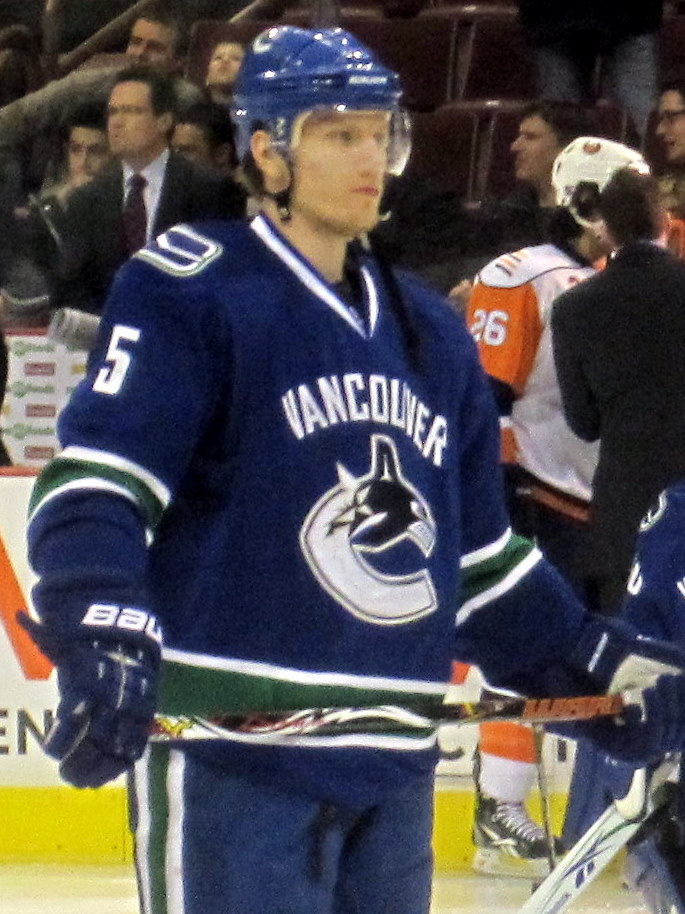
Two-time winner Christian Ehrhoff (2010, 2011).

- Player is still active with the Canucks

| Season | Winner | Win # | Ref |
|---|---|---|---|
| 1972–73 | Barry Wilkins | 1 | |
| 1973–74 | Jocelyn Guevremont | 1 | |
| 1974–75 | Bob Dailey | 1 | |
| 1975–76 | Dennis Kearns | 1 | |
| 1976–77 | Dennis Kearns | 2 | |
| 1977–78 | Harold Snepsts | 1 | |
| 1978–79 | Harold Snepsts | 2 | |
| 1979–80 | Harold Snepsts | 3 | |
| 1980–81 | Kevin McCarthy | 1 | |
| 1981–82 | Harold Snepsts | 4 | |
| 1982–83 | Doug Halward | 1 | |
| 1983–84 | Rick Lanz | 1 | |
| 1984–85 | Doug Lidster | 1 | |
| 1985–86 | Doug Lidster | 2 | |
| 1986–87 | Doug Lidster | 3 | |
| 1987–88 | Jim Benning | 1 | |
| 1988–89 | Paul Reinhart | 1 | |
| 1989–90 | Paul Reinhart | 2 | |
| 1990–91 | Doug Lidster | 4 | |
| 1991–92 | Jyrki Lumme | 1 | |
| 1992–93 | Dana Murzyn | 1 | |
| 1993–94 | Jyrki Lumme | 2 | |
| 1994–95 | Jeff Brown | 1 | |
| 1995–96 | Jyrki Lumme | 3 | |
| 1996–97 | Jyrki Lumme | 4 | |
| 1997–98 | Mattias Ohlund | 1 | |
| 1998–99 | Adrian Aucoin | 1 | |
| 1999–2000 | Mattias Ohlund | 2 | |
| 2000–01 | Ed Jovanovski | 1 | |
| 2001–02 | Ed Jovanovski | 2 | |
| 2002–03 | Ed Jovanovski | 3 | |
| 2003–04 | Mattias Ohlund | 3 | |
| 2004–05 | Season cancelled due to the 2004–05 NHL lockout | | |
| 2005–06 | Mattias Ohlund | 4 | |
| 2006–07 | Kevin Bieksa | 1 | |
| 2007–08 | Willie Mitchell | 1 | |
| 2008–09 | Willie Mitchell | 2 | |
| 2009–10 | Christian Ehrhoff | 1 | |
| 2010–11 | Christian Ehrhoff | 2 | |
| 2011–12 | Alexander Edler | 1 | |
| 2012–13 | Dan Hamhuis | 1 | |
| 2013–14 | Dan Hamhuis | 2 | |
| 2014–15 | Chris Tanev | 1 | |
| 2015–16 | Ben Hutton | 1 | |
| 2016–17 | Troy Stecher | 1 | |
| 2017–18 | Alexander Edler | 2 | |
| 2018–19 | Alexander Edler | 3 | |
| 2019–20 | Quinn Hughes | 1 | |
| 2020–21 | Quinn Hughes | 2 | |
| 2021–22 | Quinn Hughes | 3 | |
| 2022–23 | Quinn Hughes | 4 | |
| 2023–24 | Quinn Hughes | 5 | |
| 2024–25 | Quinn Hughes | 6 | |
| 2025–26 | Filip Hronek | 1 | |

== See also ==
- Cyclone Taylor Trophy
- Cyrus H. McLean Trophy
- Fred J. Hume Award
- Molson Cup
- Pavel Bure Most Exciting Player Award
