= Jyrki Lumme =

Finnish ice hockey player

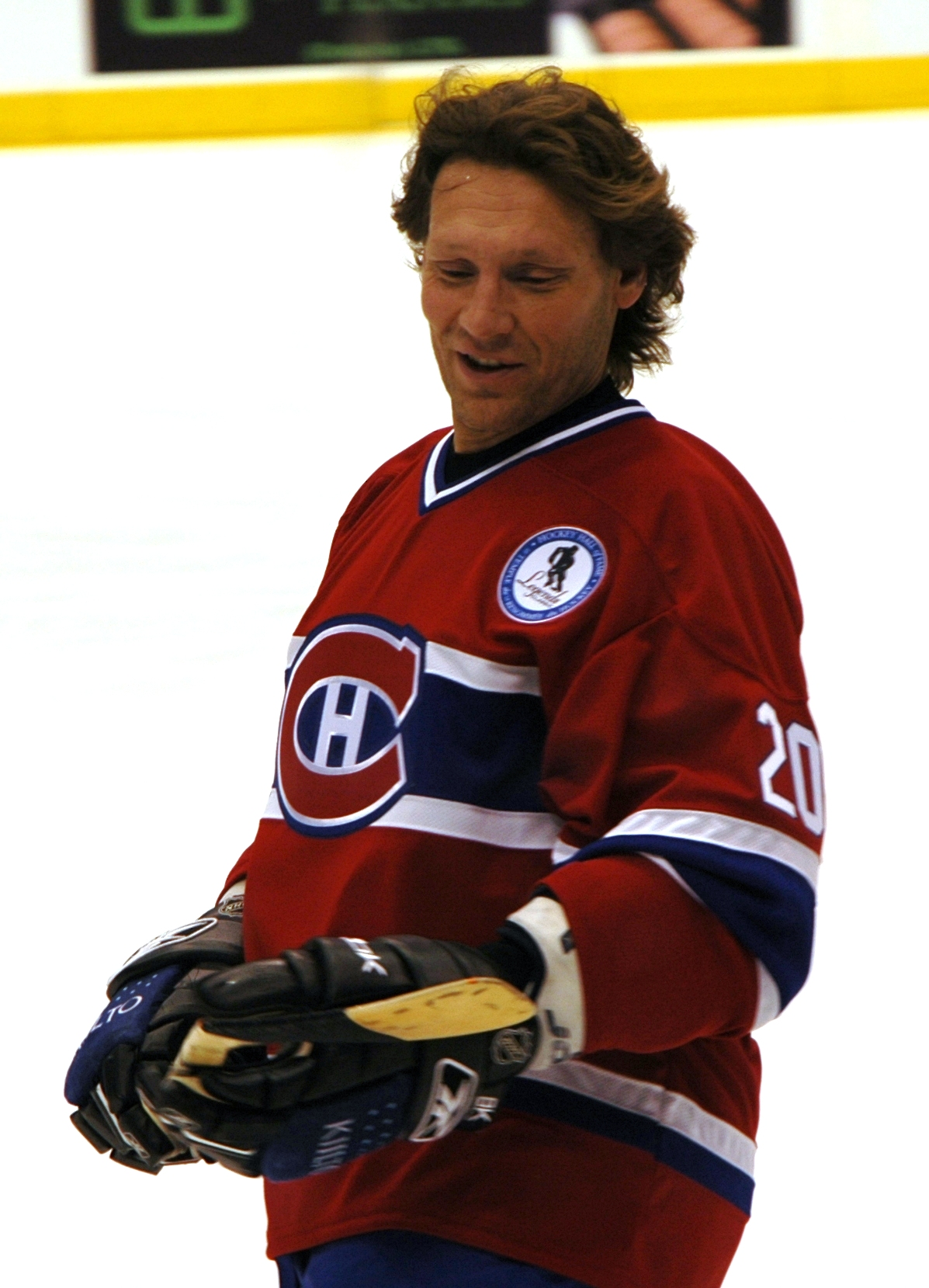
- Lumme with the Montreal Canadiens alumni in 2008.
- Born: July 16, 1966 (age 60) Tampere, Finland
- Height: 6 ft 1 in (185 cm)
- Weight: 205 lb (93 kg; 14 st 9 lb)
- Position: Defence
- Shot: Left
- Played for: Ilves; Toronto Maple Leafs; Dallas Stars; Phoenix Coyotes; Vancouver Canucks; Montreal Canadiens
- National team: Finland
- NHL draft: 57th overall, 1986; Montreal Canadiens
- Playing career: 1985–2007

Jyrki Lumme
Medal record

Representing Finland

Men's ice hockey

Olympic Games
Silver medal – second place	1988 Calgary	
Bronze medal – third place	1998 Nagano	

World Championships
Bronze medal – third place	2000 Russia	

Jyrki Olavi Lumme (born July 16, 1966) is a Finnish former professional ice hockey defenceman who played in the National Hockey League (NHL) and SM-liiga. After beginning his career in Finland, playing with Ilves Tampere for three seasons, he moved to North America to join the Montreal Canadiens in 1988. The Canadiens had selected Lumme two years prior in the 1986 NHL entry draft 57th overall. In his second NHL season, he was traded to the Vancouver Canucks, with whom he spent the majority of his career and enjoyed the most success. Over nine seasons with the Canucks, Lumme was named the club's annual top defenceman on four occasions, became the team's all-time top goal- and point-scoring defenceman, and was a part of the squad's run to the 1994 Stanley Cup Final. Towards the end of his NHL career, he additionally played for the Phoenix Coyotes, Dallas Stars and Toronto Maple Leafs over the span of five seasons. In 2005, Lumme returned to Ilves Tampere of the SM-liiga after a two-year playing hiatus. He played two final campaigns in Finland before retiring, at which point he became a part-owner of Ilves Tampere.

== Playing career ==
=== Early career (1985–90) ===
Lumme began his professional career in with Ilves Tampere of the SM-liiga in 1985–86. Following his rookie season in Finland, Lumme was selected by the Montreal Canadiens in the third round (57th overall) of the 1986 NHL entry draft. He remained with Ilves Tampere for two seasons following his draft. In his final year before transferring to the NHL, Lumme scored 8 goals and 30 points over 43 games to help Ilves to the best regular season record in the league.

In August 1988, Lumme signed a two-year contract with the Canadiens. Playing his first season in North America, Lumme split the 1988–89 campaign between Montreal and their minor league affiliate, the Sherbrooke Canadiens of the American Hockey League (AHL). He became the first Finnish player to compete for the Canadiens in team history. While playing in an NHL game against the Detroit Red Wings on December 5, 1988, he suffered a knee injury, sidelining him for some time. He finished the season with 15 points over 26 AHL games, while registering 4 points over 21 NHL games within the Canadiens organization. The following season, Lumme earned a full-time NHL roster spot with the Canadiens.

After scoring 20 points over 54 games with Montreal during the campaign, he was traded to the Vancouver Canucks on March 6, 1990. In exchange for Lumme, Montreal acquired the St. Louis Blues' second-round selection in the 1991 NHL entry draft (previously acquired by Vancouver; Montreal selected Craig Darby). In retrospect of the trade, Lumme recalls not fitting into the Canadiens' playing style and expecting to be dealt away.

=== Vancouver Canucks (1990–98) ===
Lumme proved to be a good fit in Vancouver as he quickly established himself as the Canucks' top offensive defenceman. He was placed on a defensive pairing with Paul Reinhart immediately after the trade and scored 10 points in 11 games to finish the regular season. In his first full season with Vancouver, Lumme improved to 32 points over 80 games. The following season, he recorded his first of back-to-back 44-point seasons and earned his first of four Babe Pratt Trophies as the team's top defenceman. In 1993–94, Lumme posted a career-high 55 points, second only to late-season acquisition Jeff Brown among team defencemen. He added 13 points in 24 playoff games, helping Vancouver to the 1994 Stanley Cup Final, where they were defeated by the New York Rangers in seven games.

Due to the subsequent 1994–95 NHL lockout, Lumme returned to Finland to play for Ilves Tampere. He recorded 8 points in 12 games before NHL play resumed midway through the campaign, at which point he returned to the Canucks. Lumme continued as one of the Canucks' standout defencemen for the duration of his time with the club, as his defensive game improved as well. He fell only one point short of his career high during the 1995–96 season, scoring 54 points — first among team defencemen. He also managed a personal best 17 goals. The following season, he won his fourth and final Babe Pratt Trophy in 1997. Lumme led the Canucks' defence in scoring his final two years in Vancouver before becoming an unrestricted free agent in July 1998 and signing with the Phoenix Coyotes. He left Vancouver as the franchise's all-time leading scorer among defencemen in goals with 83 (surpassed by Mattias Öhlund on December 15, 2007) and points with 321 (tied Dennis Kearns and since surpassed by Öhlund).

=== Post-Vancouver (1998–2007) ===
Playing with his third NHL club, Lumme remained a prominent member on his team's blueline. With 28-, 40- and 25-point seasons in Phoenix, Lumme finishing second among team defencemen in scoring behind Teppo Numminen in all three campaigns. On June 23, 2001, he was traded from Phoenix to the Dallas Stars in exchange for forward Tyler Bouck. Lumme played 15 games with the club in 2001–02. He left the Stars on October 29, 2001, to briefly visit his family in Finland after receiving permission from general manager Bob Gainey. His wife Minna and two kids had planned to join Lumme in Dallas during the season, but were reluctant to take a plane after the recent 9/11 terrorist attacks. Lumme and coach Ken Hitchcock clashed openly during his brief time in Dallas, however, and he was put on waivers. After clearing, he was traded to the Toronto Maple Leafs in exchange for another veteran blueliner, Dave Manson, on November 21, 2001. The deal was initiated by Maple Leafs general manager Pat Quinn, Lumme's former coach and general manager in Vancouver, who commended Lumme as a "cornerstone" for the Canucks' success during his time with the club.

Near the end of the season, Lumme was suspended two games for cross-checking Buffalo Sabres forward J. P. Dumont in a game on March 2, 2002. He also missed an additional four games with a shoulder injury. Following the trade from Dallas, he posted 12 points in 51 games for Toronto. During the 2002 playoffs, Lumme suffered a concussion and re-aggravated his shoulder during the second round against the Ottawa Senators. He suffered the injury after being hit into the boards by opposing forward Chris Neil. Sidelined for the remainder of the playoffs, he watched as the Leafs were eliminated by the Carolina Hurricanes in the semifinals.

After discovering his shoulder injury did not require surgery, Lumme spent the 2003 off-season rehabilitating himself in Vancouver, British Columbia. Prior to the 2002–03 season, he was left unprotected for the NHL's waiver draft. With Lumme set to earn $2.75 million that season, however, he went unselected and remained with Toronto, scoring 17 points in 73 games. He played his last NHL game on April 23, 2003, registering an assist against the Philadelphia Flyers. At the end of the season, the Maple Leafs bought out the final remaining year on Lumme's contract for two-thirds of his expected $1.5 million salary.

After his buy out, Lumme took a two-year playing hiatus. During this time, he returned to Vancouver, doing broadcast work for Finnish television. He also became a part-owner of his former Finnish club, Ilves Tampere. In 2005, he returned to play for Ilves. Following his retirement in 2007, Lumme became a part-owner of the Ilves hockey club.

== Playing style ==
Though Lumme's smooth skating and accurate wrist shot made him best known as an offensive defenceman, during the peak of his career he was reliable in his own end too, with an effective backhand that allowed him to clear the zone with ease. Playing on the West Coast, many analysts felt that Lumme never received the kind of acclaim he might have in an NHL market with more media exposure. In this vein, Canuck broadcaster Tom Larscheid once called him "the best kept secret outside of British Columbia."

== Personal life ==
Lumme and his wife have two children. Following his retirement, he settled with his family in a countryside cabin in Finland. He returns to Vancouver often, retaining his home in North Vancouver from his playing career with the Canucks.

Lumme is involved with the NHL Players Association Goals and Dreams Program, an organization that donates hockey equipment to children of low-income families worldwide. He donates his time generously for many celebrity hockey tournaments.

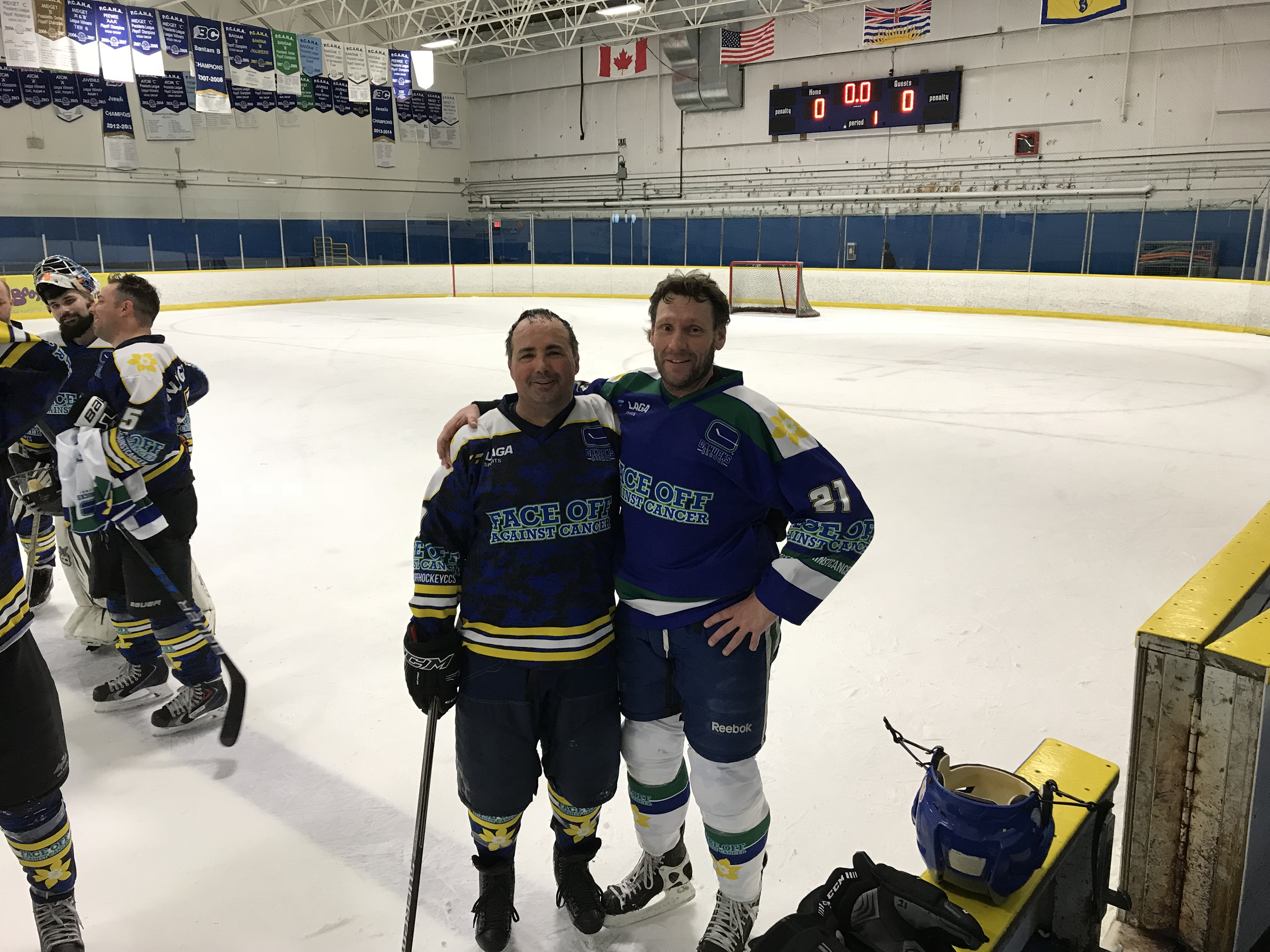
Jyrki Lumme at Canadian Cancer Society event with Thomas Forbes

== Career statistics ==
=== Regular season and playoffs ===
			Regular season					Playoffs
Season	Team	League	GP	G	A	Pts	PIM	GP	G	A	Pts	PIM
1983–84	KOOVEE	FIN U20	28	5	4	9	61	—	—	—	—	—
1984–85	KOOVEE	FIN U20	27	6	4	10	44	—	—	—	—	—
1985–86	Ilves	FIN U20	6	3	3	6	6	4	0	0	0	8
1985–86	Ilves	SM-l	31	1	4	5	4	—	—	—	—	—
1986–87	Ilves	FIN U20	1	0	1	1	6	1	1	0	1	6
1986–87	Ilves	SM-l	43	12	12	24	52	—	—	—	—	—
1987–88	Ilves	SM-l	43	8	22	30	75	4	0	1	1	2
1988–89	Montreal Canadiens	NHL	21	1	3	4	10	—	—	—	—	—
1988–89	Sherbrooke Canadiens	AHL	26	4	11	15	10	6	1	3	4	4
1989–90	Montreal Canadiens	NHL	54	1	19	20	41	—	—	—	—	—
1989–90	Vancouver Canucks	NHL	11	3	7	10	8	—	—	—	—	—
1990–91	Vancouver Canucks	NHL	80	5	27	32	59	6	2	3	5	0
1991–92	Vancouver Canucks	NHL	75	12	32	44	65	13	2	3	5	4
1992–93	Vancouver Canucks	NHL	74	8	36	44	55	12	0	5	5	6
1993–94	Vancouver Canucks	NHL	83	13	42	55	50	24	2	11	13	16
1994–95	Ilves	SM-l	12	4	4	8	24	—	—	—	—	—
1994–95	Vancouver Canucks	NHL	36	5	12	17	26	11	2	6	8	8
1995–96	Vancouver Canucks	NHL	80	17	37	54	50	6	1	3	4	2
1996–97	Vancouver Canucks	NHL	66	11	24	35	32	—	—	—	—	—
1997–98	Vancouver Canucks	NHL	74	9	21	30	34	—	—	—	—	—
1998–99	Phoenix Coyotes	NHL	60	7	21	28	34	7	0	1	1	6
1999–2000	Phoenix Coyotes	NHL	74	8	32	40	44	5	0	1	1	2
2000–01	Phoenix Coyotes	NHL	58	4	21	25	44	—	—	—	—	—
2001–02	Dallas Stars	NHL	15	0	1	1	4	—	—	—	—	—
2001–02	Toronto Maple Leafs	NHL	51	4	8	12	18	14	0	0	0	4
2002–03	Toronto Maple Leafs	NHL	73	6	11	17	46	7	0	2	2	4
2005–06	Ilves	SM-l	45	6	12	18	118	4	0	0	0	6
2006–07	Ilves	SM-l	22	3	8	11	28	3	0	2	2	6
SM-l totals			196	34	62	96	301	11	0	3	3	14
NHL totals			985	114	354	468	620	105	9	35	44	52

=== International ===
Year	Team	Event	GP	G	A	Pts	PIM
1986	Finland	WJC	7	1	4	5	2
1988	Finland	OLY	6	0	1	1	2
1990	Finland	WC	10	3	4	7	6
1991	Finland	WC	10	0	7	7	12
1991	Finland	CC	6	0	2	2	8
1996	Finland	WC	1	0	0	0	0
1996	Finland	WCH	4	2	1	3	4
1997	Finland	WC	8	0	3	3	4
1998	Finland	OLY	6	1	0	1	16
2000	Finland	WC	9	2	3	5	4
2002	Finland	OLY	4	0	1	1	0
Junior totals			7	1	4	5	2
Senior totals			64	8	22	30	56

== Awards ==
- Babe Pratt Trophy (Vancouver Canucks' best defenceman) - 1992, 1994, 1996, 1997
