= Willie Mitchell (ice hockey) =

Canadian ice hockey player (born 1977)

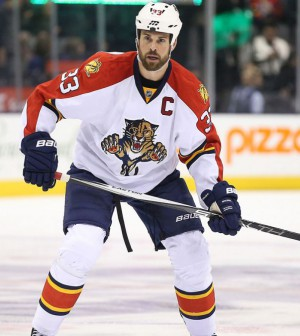
- Mitchell with the Florida Panthers in 2015
- Born: April 23, 1977 (age 49) Port McNeill, British Columbia, Canada
- Height: 6 ft 3 in (191 cm)
- Weight: 208 lb (94 kg; 14 st 12 lb)
- Position: Defence
- Shot: Left
- Played for: New Jersey Devils; Minnesota Wild; Dallas Stars; Vancouver Canucks; Los Angeles Kings; Florida Panthers
- National team: Canada
- NHL draft: 199th overall, 1996; New Jersey Devils
- Playing career: 2000–2016
Medal record
Men's ice hockey
Representing Canada
World Championships
Gold medal – first place	2004 Czech Republic

William Mitchell (born April 23, 1977) is a Canadian former professional ice hockey player. He is known primarily as a physical defensive defenceman. Mitchell played Junior A in the British Columbia Hockey League (BCHL) and Saskatchewan Junior Hockey League (SJHL) before joining the college ranks with the Clarkson Knights of ECAC Hockey in 1997. He won an ECAC championship with Clarkson in 1999, while also earning playoff MVP and ECAC First Team All-Star honours.

Selected by the New Jersey Devils in the 1996 NHL entry draft, he played two seasons with the Albany River Rats of the American Hockey League (AHL) while earning limited playing time with the Devils over two seasons. In 2001, he was traded to the Minnesota Wild where he played four seasons before a brief stint with the Dallas Stars. He signed with the Vancouver Canucks in the 2006 off-season and was named the team's top defenceman twice, in 2008 and 2009. After four seasons in Vancouver, Mitchell signed with the Los Angeles Kings in August 2010. While with Los Angeles, Mitchell won the Stanley Cup twice (2012 and 2014) before signing with the Florida Panthers in the 2014 off-season.

Internationally, he has represented Team Canada once at the 2004 World Championships, capturing a gold medal.

== Early life ==
Mitchell was born on April 23, 1977, to Reid and Nadija Mitchell. He has a sister named Chantal. His father is a retired heavy-duty mechanic with Western Forest Products, while his mother is a Croatian-born immigrant who retired as a terminal service agent for B.C. Ferries. Mitchell's grandfather, Les Mitchell, played amateur senior hockey and once earned a tryout with the New York Rangers during the Original Six-era. His grandfather, Les, scored the championship-winning goal for the Nanaimo Clippers in 1945. Les Mitchell was reportedly the last person to skate on the ice at the Civic Arena in Nanaimo before it was torn down.

Mitchell was born and raised in Port McNeill, British Columbia, a small logging town on Vancouver Island. He grew up working on the docks in his hometown unloading fish and cleaning equipment. He first began skating at the age of four and took figure skating. Growing up as a Vancouver Canucks fan, his father would take him across to the mainland to see games at the Pacific Coliseum. He played minor hockey as a winger with the North Island Eagles and won back-to-back double-A provincial titles in pee wee and bantam with the club. At the age of 15, he left home after being recruited to play for Athol Murray College of Notre Dame, a high school in Wilcox, Saskatchewan. It was there that he switched from wing to defence. He played with the Notre Dame Hounds' midget team of the Saskatchewan Midget Hockey League (SMHL) and recorded 15 points over 31 games in 1993–94. From there, he earned an athletic scholarship with Clarkson University in Potsdam, New York.

== Playing career ==
=== Junior and college hockey (1994–99) ===
As a junior hockey player, Mitchell began in the BCHL with the Kelowna Spartans in 1994–95, recording 11 points over 42 games. After one season with Kelowna, he joined the Melfort Mustangs of the Saskatchewan Junior Hockey League (SJHL). Following his first season with Melfort in 1995–96, he was selected by the New Jersey Devils in the eighth round, 199th overall, in the 1996 NHL entry draft. He returned to Melfort for a second season and recorded 56 points in 64 games to earn the Top Defenceman Award and SJHL First All-Star Team honours.

Beginning in 1997–98, Mitchell began two seasons of college hockey with Clarkson University Golden Knights of the ECAC. In his freshman year, he recorded 26 points over 34 games, fourth among league defencemen, and was named co-Rookie of the Year with Clarkson teammate Erik Cole. He also earned ECAC All-Rookie and ECAC Second All-Star honours. Clarkson advanced to the ECAC Tournament Final against Princeton University, but lost 5–4 in double overtime. The following season, Mitchell led all Golden Knights defencemen in scoring with 29 points (10 goals and 19 assists) and a +13 rating in 34 games. He finished the season with a league player of the week recognition on March 1, 1999. As Clarkson met Princeton in the 1999 ECAC Semi-final, Mitchell scored the game winning goal with a slap shot from centre ice with three seconds remaining in regulation. Clarkson went on to defeat St. Lawrence University 3–2 in the final to capture the ECAC championship. Mitchell earned tournament MVP honours and was also named to the ECAC First All-Star Team and NCAA East Second All-American Team.

=== New Jersey Devils (1999–2001) ===
Following his sophomore season with Clarkson, Mitchell decided to forgo his final two seasons of college eligibility to turn professional in the New Jersey Devils system. He played the final six games of the 1998–99 AHL season with the Devils' minor league affiliate, the Albany River Rats, registering a goal and three assists.

In his first Devils' training camp in September 1999, he broke a finger in his left hand during a fight in a rookie game against the Boston Bruins. The injury required three pins to set the finger in place. Although sidelined, the Devils signed him to a rookie contract in September 1999. After recovering, he was assigned to the River Rats. Mitchell received a call-up late in the season and made his NHL debut on March 27, 2000, in a 5–2 loss to the Toronto Maple Leafs. He stayed with the Devils for a week before being returned to the AHL. He finished the 1999–2000 season with 19 points over 63 games with the River Rats and no points in two games with the Devils.

The following season, Mitchell made the Devils' opening lineup, but was a regular healthy scratch. After appearing in 11 games, he was returned to the AHL on November 22, 2000. He registered his first NHL point, an assist, during his initial stint. After injuries to Devils defencemen Scott Niedermayer and Brian Rafalski, Mitchell was recalled on February 10, 2001. The following month, after having been sent back down to the AHL, he was traded to the Minnesota Wild on March 4, 2001, in exchange for defenceman Sean O'Donnell.

=== Minnesota Wild and Dallas Stars (2001–06) ===
Following the trade, Mitchell became a full-time NHLer, playing in 17 games with the Wild to finish the season. He completed his rookie NHL season with a goal and 10 assists over 33 games between the Devils and Wild. In his first full season with the Wild in 2001–02, he recorded three goals and 13 points in 68 games, while earning $550,000 from his initial rookie contract with the Devils. He missed 14 games due to three separate shoulder, groin and wrist injuries. Establishing himself as a top-four defenceman on the team, paired with Brad Bombardir, Mitchell ranked third on the team in average ice time with 21:25 minutes per game. The following season, he improved to a third-ranked plus-13 on the team after going –16 the previous season. He went on to help the club make a run in the 2003 playoffs to the semi-finals, leading the team with a +5 rating in 18 post-season games. He suffered a cheekbone injury during the first round against the Colorado Avalanche that required him to wear a fully visored helmet for the remainder of the playoffs. After defeating the Avalanche and Vancouver Canucks in the first two rounds, the Wild were eliminated in four games by the Mighty Ducks of Anaheim in the semi-finals.

In the off-season, he was re-signed to a one-year contract by the Wild on August 11, 2003. He recorded 14 points over 70 games in 2003–04, while leading the Wild with a +12 rating and ranking second in average ice time at 22:35 minutes per game. Minnesota failed to qualify for the playoffs.

On June 30, 2004, the Wild tendered Mitchell a qualifying offer, but he later filed for arbitration on July 7. The two sides avoided arbitration by agreeing on a one-year, $1.775 million deal on August 12, 2004. However, due to the NHL lockout, Mitchell was inactive in 2004–05. With NHL play set to resume for 2005–06, he re-signed with the Wild to another one-year, $1 million contract on August 9, 2005. In December 2005, he was named team captain as part of the Wild's monthly rotating captaincy (he was then succeeded by Brian Rolston in February 2006).

At the 2005–06 NHL trade deadline, Mitchell was traded away to the Dallas Stars as a rental player in exchange for defencemen Martin Škoula and Shawn Belle on March 9, 2006. Mitchell closed the season playing 16 games and one playoff round with Dallas before becoming an unrestricted free agent in the off-season.

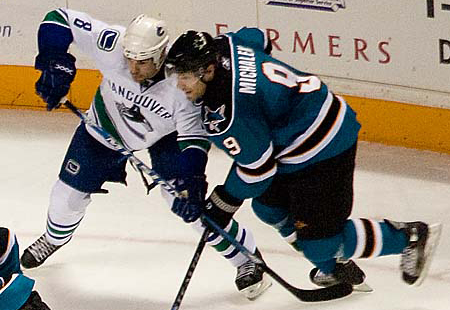
Mitchell (left) battles for position with Milan Michalek of the San Jose Sharks during a December 2007 game.

=== Vancouver Canucks (2006–2010) ===
On July 1, 2006, the Vancouver Canucks signed Mitchell to a four-year, $14 million contract. Canucks General Manager Dave Nonis had previously attempted to acquire him at the previous season's trade deadline before he was sent to Dallas. His acquisition as a free agent followed the signings of goaltender Roberto Luongo and head coach Alain Vigneault, which reflected an effort from Nonis to develop a defence-first system.

Early in the 2006–07 season, Mitchell suffered a concussion on October 23 and missed nine games. He then missed 11 more games due to a recurring groin injury in February and March 2007. He finished his first season with the Canucks recording a goal and 11 points in 62 games. His 4:57 minutes of average shorthanded ice time per game ranked third in the NHL behind Derian Hatcher and Adam Foote. He helped the team to the second round of the 2007 playoffs, where they were defeated by the Anaheim Ducks in five games.

During his second season with Vancouver, he missed ten games with a fractured vertebra. The injury was sustained on December 31, 2007, in a loss to the Calgary Flames, while trying to dodge a check. However, Mitchell continued to play with the injury for nine games afterwards. He recorded two goals and 12 points, while leading the team with 108 blocked shots and 1,646:20 minutes in total ice time. At the end of the 2007–08 season, he was awarded his first Babe Pratt Trophy as the Canucks' top defenceman.

With the departure of long-time Canucks captain Markus Näslund to free agency in the 2008 off-season, Mitchell was considered a leading candidate for captaincy. The Canucks instead appointed team MVP Roberto Luongo as the first goaltender to be a captain since 1947–48 on September 30, 2008. Mitchell was named alternate captain along with forward Ryan Kesler and defenceman Mattias Öhlund. Due to Luongo's limitations as a goaltender, Mitchell was designated the captain's traditional role of disputing calls by the officials and relaying messages to the coach.

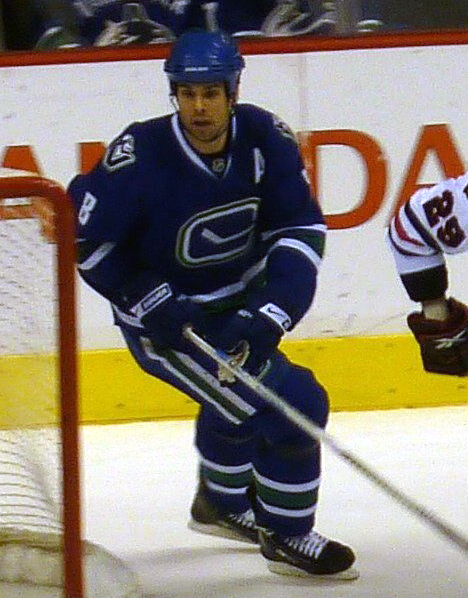
Mitchell (left) during a Canucks game against Chicago Blackhawks forward Bryan Bickell (far right) in November 2009

During the subsequent 2008–09 season, Mitchell recorded career-highs with three goals, 20 assists, 23 points and a team-best +29 rating, earning his second consecutive Babe Pratt Trophy. He added two assists and led all Canucks in average ice time at 24:12 minutes per game in the post-season. He helped the Canucks advance to the second round, where they were eliminated by the Chicago Blackhawks in six games.

Early on in the 2009–10 season, Mitchell delivered an open-ice hit that concussed Blackhawks captain Jonathan Toews in the two teams' first game against each other since the 2009 playoffs. Mitchell had just exited the penalty box when he caught Toews with his head down receiving a pass in the neutral zone; the hit was deemed legal as Mitchell checked Toews with his shoulder. Toews was sidelined for six games as a result. Later on in the season, Mitchell suffered a concussion himself, receiving a hit from opposing forward Evgeni Malkin, causing his head to hit the end boards, during a game against the Pittsburgh Penguins on January 16. He was sidelined for the remainder of the season with post-concussion syndrome, finishing with 12 points and a +13 rating in 48 games.

Unsure if the injury had ended his career, Mitchell later recalled his subsequent recovery as "the toughest year of [his] life." Not speaking to the media until after the Canucks were eliminated in the playoffs, he expressed criticism towards both Malkin for the hit resulting in his concussion and to NHL Senior Vice President Colin Campbell for not taking any disciplinary action. He denounced Campbell for being "inconsistent...hand[ing] down suspensions and fines on result [instead of the nature of a hit]," as Mitchell's injury was not immediately apparent following the game.

Mitchell's four-year deal with the Canucks expired on July 1, 2010, and he became an unrestricted free agent. Mitchell was still involved in negotiations with Vancouver to re-sign, but concerns over his head injury, as well as the new defensive acquisitions of Keith Ballard and Dan Hamhuis in the off-season factored against the possibility of remaining with the Canucks.

=== Los Angeles Kings (2010–2014) ===
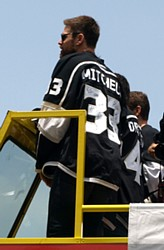
Mitchell at the 2012 Stanley Cup parade

On August 25, 2010, Mitchell signed a two-year deal worth $3.5 million per season with the Los Angeles Kings. He had interest from several other teams, including the Washington Capitals and San Jose Sharks. The Canucks were also offering a one-year contract between $1.8 and $2 million, but were not willing to match the Kings' deal. Mitchell expressed disappointment in leaving the Canucks, but stated he was "looking forward to going to a team which, I get the feeling, is really passionate about having me there."

Mitchell began the season on a defensive pairing with Drew Doughty. Nearly a month into the campaign, he notched his first goal as a King, scoring short handed against the Dallas Stars in a 5–2 victory on October 28, 2010. In November 2010, he sustained a wrist injury during a game against the Nashville Predators, sidelining him for 12 games. After recovering, he suffered a knee injury, keeping him from another 11 games. Later in the season, during a game against the Phoenix Coyotes, on March 3, 2011, Mitchell was hit in the face by a shot from opposing forward Kyle Turris, requiring 53 stitches. He did not miss any additional games, however. Mitchell finished the season with five goals and five assists over 57 games, ranking third in average ice time per contest with the Kings. He added a goal and an assist in six playoff games as the Kings were eliminated by the San Jose Sharks in the first round. On February 24, 2012, Mitchell signed a two-year contract extension with the Kings. In the 2012 playoffs, Mitchell helped the Kings defeat the Vancouver Canucks in the first round, the St. Louis Blues in the semi-finals (winning four games straight) and the Phoenix Coyotes in the Conference Final. The Kings made the Stanley Cup Final for the first time since 1993 and defeated the New Jersey Devils; this also marked Mitchell's first appearance in the Stanley Cup Final. Mitchell was the second player, after team captain Dustin Brown, to hoist the Cup after the win.

During the 2012–13 NHL lockout, Mitchell began having knee problems, requiring a first surgery to clean up debris and a second surgery after re-injuring the knee during rehabilitation prior to the 2012–13 King's training camp. Mitchell was out for the remainder of the 2012–13 season and questionable for the 2013–14 season.

Mitchell did return alongside Slava Voynov in the 2013–14 season. Mitchell missed a handful of games in the second round of the 2014 Stanley Cup playoffs due to an injury, but returned to beat the Chicago Blackhawks in the Western Conference Final and win his second Stanley Cup over the New York Rangers. He scored a goal in game two of the Final, and also assisted on Dustin Brown's double-overtime goal later in the same game.

=== Florida Panthers (2014–2016) ===
With the Kings facing cap constraints, Mitchell was not retained as a free agent. On July 1, 2014, he signed a two-year $8.5 million contract with the Florida Panthers. On October 6, 2014, Mitchell was named the eighth captain in Florida Panthers history.

On February 3, 2015, Mitchell was placed on injury reserve for a little more than a month, until a game against the New York Islanders in March.

Mitchell missed the final 42 games of the 2015–16 NHL season largely over concern what another brain injury would mean to his long-term health.

== International play ==
Mitchell has made one international appearance for Canada in his career. After the Minnesota Wild failed to qualify for the 2004 playoffs, he was named to the national team for the 2004 World Championships in the Czech Republic. (Note: As a result of the schedules of the World Championships and Stanley Cup playoffs clashing with each other, national teams choose players from club teams that have not qualified for the playoffs.) He was joined on the squad by Wild teammate Nick Schultz in the first group of players chosen by General Manager Jim Nill on April 5, 2004. Appearing in nine games, Mitchell helped Canada to a gold medal, defeating Sweden 5–3 in the final.

== Playing style ==
Mitchell plays in the style of a stay-at-home defenceman. While with the Vancouver Canucks, he established himself as their top shutdown defenceman, being matched up against opposing teams' best players and spending significant time on the penalty kill. He had usually formed a defensive pairing on the Canucks with the often offensive-minded Kevin Bieksa. Bieksa has credited Mitchell with teaching him to be more aware of game situations before jumping into the rush.

In order to defend effectively, Mitchell opts to use a longer-than-usual hockey stick. Prior to a game against the Calgary Flames on February 17, 2009, opposing head coach Mike Keenan accused Mitchell of playing with an illegal hockey stick. Mitchell responded by asserting he used the league maximum length at 63 inches.

Mitchell is also known for his leadership qualities, serving as an alternate captain on the Canucks. During his tenure with the Minnesota Wild, he was named captain for the months of December 2005 and January 2006 as part of the Wild's rotating captaincy system. At the start of the 2014–15 season, Mitchell was also named the captain of the Florida Panthers.

== Personal life ==
Mitchell married his wife Megan, a Minnesota native, on August 17, 2006, in Napa Valley, California. They reside in the Yaletown neighbourhood in downtown Vancouver, while returning to Mitchell's hometown of Port McNeill during the summer, where he fishes avidly. During the 2015–16 NHL season, Panthers rookie Aaron Ekblad lived with Mitchell and his wife.

Mitchell is an active philanthropist around the Port McNeill community. In 2004, he hosted the first Willie Mitchell Classic, a celebrity golf tournament to raise scholarship funds for high school students around his hometown. He has also regularly donated game-used equipment to fundraise for his former minor hockey team, the North Island Eagles.

In the summer of 2009, Mitchell threw the first pitch at a Seattle Mariners game against the Toronto Blue Jays at Safeco Field in Seattle, Washington.

In 2014, Mitchell was a VIP guest, sitting at the blue team's chef's table in Hell's Kitchen.

Mitchell and his wife Megan welcomed their first child, a son named Paxton, on May 4, 2017, and a second son named Hayden in December 2020.

On September 14, 2022, the Tofino Resort and Marina, co-owned by Mitchell, announced the cancellation of their Race for the Blue fishing tournament and temporary closure of the 1909 Kitchen and Bar as a result of allegations of inappropriate behavior by members of staff.

== Career statistics ==
=== Regular season and playoffs ===
			Regular season					Playoffs
Season	Team	League	GP	G	A	Pts	PIM	GP	G	A	Pts	PIM
1993–94	Notre Dame Midget Hounds	SMHL	31	4	11	15	81	—	—	—	—	—
1994–95	Kelowna Spartans	BCHL	42	3	8	11	71	—	—	—	—	—
1995–96	Melfort Mustangs	SJHL	19	2	6	8	0	14	0	2	2	12
1996–97	Melfort Mustangs	SJHL	64	14	42	56	227	4	0	1	1	23
1997–98	Clarkson University	ECAC	34	9	17	26	105	—	—	—	—	—
1998–99	Clarkson University	ECAC	34	10	19	29	40	—	—	—	—	—
1998–99	Albany River Rats	AHL	6	1	3	4	29	—	—	—	—	—
1999–00	Albany River Rats	AHL	63	5	14	19	71	5	1	2	3	4
1999–00	New Jersey Devils	NHL	2	0	0	0	0	—	—	—	—	—
2000–01	Albany River Rats	AHL	41	3	13	16	94	—	—	—	—	—
2000–01	New Jersey Devils	NHL	16	0	2	2	29	—	—	—	—	—
2000–01	Minnesota Wild	NHL	17	1	7	8	11	—	—	—	—	—
2001–02	Minnesota Wild	NHL	68	3	10	13	68	—	—	—	—	—
2002–03	Minnesota Wild	NHL	69	2	12	14	84	18	1	3	4	14
2003–04	Minnesota Wild	NHL	70	1	13	14	83	—	—	—	—	—
2005–06	Minnesota Wild	NHL	64	2	6	8	87	—	—	—	—	—
2005–06	Dallas Stars	NHL	16	0	2	2	26	5	0	0	0	2
2006–07	Vancouver Canucks	NHL	62	1	10	11	45	12	0	1	1	12
2007–08	Vancouver Canucks	NHL	72	2	10	12	81	—	—	—	—	—
2008–09	Vancouver Canucks	NHL	82	3	20	23	59	10	0	2	2	22
2009–10	Vancouver Canucks	NHL	48	4	8	12	48	—	—	—	—	—
2010–11	Los Angeles Kings	NHL	57	5	5	10	21	6	1	1	2	4
2011–12	Los Angeles Kings	NHL	76	5	19	24	44	20	1	2	3	16
2013–14	Los Angeles Kings	NHL	76	1	11	12	58	18	1	3	4	20
2014–15	Florida Panthers	NHL	66	3	5	8	25	—	—	—	—	—
2015–16	Florida Panthers	NHL	46	1	6	7	18	—	—	—	—	—
NHL totals			907	34	146	180	787	89	4	12	16	90

=== International ===
Year	Team	Event	Result	GP	G	A	Pts	PIM
2004	Canada	WC	1st place, gold medalist(s)	9	0	0	0	0
Senior totals				9	0	0	0	0

== Awards ==
=== SJHL ===
Award	Year(s)
Top Defenceman	1997
First All-Star Team	1997

=== College ===
Award	Year(s)
All-ECAC Hockey Rookie Team	1997–98
All-ECAC Hockey Second Team	1997–98
ECAC Hockey All-Tournament Team	1998
ECAC Player of the Week	March 1, 1999
AHCA East Second-Team All-American	1998–99
All-ECAC Hockey First Team	1998–99
ECAC Hockey All-Tournament Team	1999
ECAC Playoff MVP	1999
ECAC championship (Clarkson University)	1999

=== NHL ===
Award	Year(s)
Stanley Cup champion	2012; 2014

=== Vancouver Canucks ===
Award	Year(s)
Babe Pratt Trophy (best defenceman)	2008; 2009

== Notes ==
Awards and achievements
Preceded by J. R. Prestifilippo	ECAC Hockey Rookie of the Year; 1997–98; Shared With; Erik Cole	Succeeded by Brandon Dietrich
Preceded by Jeff Halpern	ECAC Hockey Most Outstanding Player in Tournament; 1999	Succeeded by Derek Gustafson
Preceded by Kevin Bieksa	Babe Pratt Trophy; 2008, 2009	Succeeded by Christian Ehrhoff
Sporting positions
Preceded by Filip Kuba	Minnesota Wild captain Dec–Jan 2005–06	Succeeded by Brian Rolston
Preceded by Ed Jovanovski	Florida Panthers captain 2014–16	Succeeded by Derek MacKenzie
