= Ed Jovanovski =

Canadian ice hockey player (born 1976)

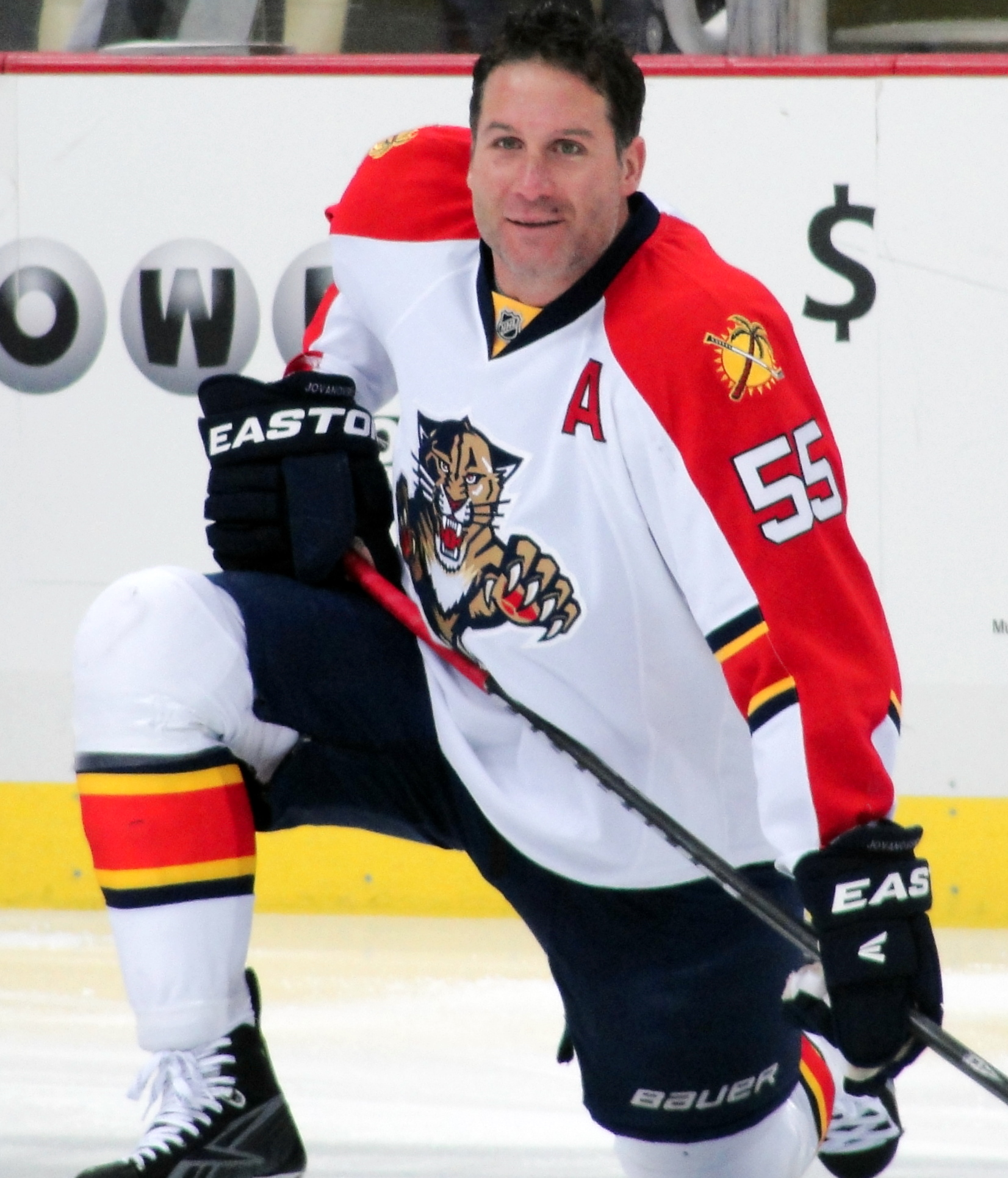
- Jovanovski with the Florida Panthers in 2012
- Born: June 26, 1976 (age 50) Windsor, Ontario, Canada
- Height: 6 ft 3 in (191 cm)
- Weight: 220 lb (100 kg; 15 st 10 lb)
- Position: Defence
- Shot: Left
- Played for: Florida Panthers; Vancouver Canucks; Phoenix Coyotes
- National team: Canada
- NHL draft: 1st overall, 1994; Florida Panthers
- Playing career: 1994–2014
Medal record
Representing Canada
Ice hockey
World Championships
Silver medal – second place	2005 Austria
Silver medal – second place	2008 Canada
World Cup
Gold medal – first place	2004 Canada
Olympic Games
Gold medal – first place	2002 Salt Lake City
World Junior Championships
Gold medal – first place	1995 Canada

Edward Jovanovski (born June 26, 1976), nicknamed "JovoCop", (Note: Coined by Florida Panthers play-by-play broadcaster Chris Moore, this was clearly an allusion to the RoboCop franchise and its similarly hard-hitting protagonist, which, following its first appearance in print, circa February 1996, was promtly embraced by both U.S. and Canadian sportswriters, thus becoming Jovanovski's downsized, Anglicized, and instantly recognizable nickname, presented variously as Jovocop, Jovo-Cop, Jovo Cop, or simply Jovo. (In turn, "Jovo Cop" itself inspired at least one notable punning variation.)) is a Canadian former professional ice hockey player.

A defenceman, he was born in Windsor, Ontario, and played major junior ice hockey for two seasons with the Windsor Spitfires of the Ontario Hockey League (OHL), earning First All-Star, Second All-Star and All-Rookie Team honours. He was then selected first overall in the 1994 NHL entry draft by the Florida Panthers. During his rookie NHL season, he earned All-Rookie Team honours and helped the Panthers advance to the Stanley Cup Final, where they lost to the Colorado Avalanche. After three-and-a-half seasons in Florida, Jovanovski was traded to the Vancouver Canucks in a seven-player deal involving Pavel Bure. During his tenure with Vancouver, he was awarded the Babe Pratt Trophy as the team's best defenceman three consecutive years. He also led the club's defencemen in scoring four consecutive years. In July 2006, Jovanovski became an unrestricted free agent and signed with the Phoenix Coyotes. He led the team's defencemen in scoring during his first three years with the club. Jovanovski returned to the Florida Panthers for three seasons, before retiring in 2015. Long known as a two-way defenceman, Jovanovski recorded one 50-point season, as well as three of 40 or better points, during his NHL career.

Internationally, Jovanovski played for the Canadian national team. He won a gold medal at the 2002 Winter Olympics Games in Salt Lake City. At the under-20 level, he won gold at the 1995 World Junior Championship. He went on to play in four World Championships, winning silver in 2005 and 2008. He represented Canada at the 2004 World Cup, playing in one game due to injury in the championship-winning tournament.

== Playing career ==
=== Major junior (1993–95) ===
As a youth, Jovanovski played in the 1990 Quebec International Pee-Wee Hockey Tournament with a minor ice hockey team from Windsor. After playing bantam and Junior B in his hometown of Windsor, Jovanovski joined the Ontario Hockey League (OHL) with the Windsor Spitfires. In his rookie season with the Spitfires, Jovanovski led all team defencemen in scoring, with 50 points in 62 games. In addition to being voted as the Emms Division's top bodychecker by League coaches, he was named to the OHL's All-Rookie and Second All-Star Teams. That off-season, Jovanovski was selected first overall by the Florida Panthers in the 1994 NHL entry draft. He admitted to being surprised at the top selection, as he had not been ranked first at any point in his draft-eligible season. Czech prospect Radek Bonk was ranked first overall by the NHL Central Scouting Bureau, but Panthers President Bill Torrey preferred to select a defenceman over a forward.

Following the Draft, the 1994–95 NHL season was suspended for three-and-a-half months due to a labour dispute between NHL players and owners. Consequently, Jovanovski remained in junior for the beginning of the 1994–95 OHL season. When NHL was set to resume play in January 1995, it was speculated that the Panthers might sign Jovanovski and call him up to the NHL. However, then-Panthers General Manager Bryan Murray announced that Jovanovski would remain with Windsor, citing that he would likely not receive much playing time with the club. He averaged approximately 40 minutes per game with Windsor that season, scoring 23 goals and 65 points over 50 contests. He also added nine points in nine playoff games before Windsor was eliminated. Jovanovski was named to the OHL First All-Star Team.

=== Florida Panthers (1995–1999) ===
Following his second major junior season, Jovanovski signed a four-year, $5.7 million contract with the Panthers in June 1995. Playing with the club during the subsequent pre-season, he broke his right hand during a fight with Hartford Whalers forward Brendan Shanahan. The injury caused him to miss the first 11 games of the season. After recovering, he scored his first career NHL goal against the Whalers on December 2, 1995, a game-winner in a 5–3 victory. He finished his rookie season with 10 goals and 21 points over 70 games. During the regular season, he was encouraged by Panthers management to play more conservatively than he was used to in the OHL, focusing on defensive positioning.

Ranking fourth in the Eastern Conference going into the 1996 playoffs, Jovanovski helped the Panthers advance to the Stanley Cup Final. He scored his first career Stanley Cup playoff goal in game two of the first round against Boston Bruins goaltender Craig Billington. Facing the Colorado Avalanche in the Finals, the Panthers were defeated in four-straight games. Jovanovski contributed a goal and nine points in 22 post-season games. It would be his only Stanley Cup Final appearance. In the off-season, he was named to the NHL All-Rookie Team. He was also nominated for the Calder Memorial Trophy as the League's rookie of the year, alongside Chicago Blackhawks forward Éric Dazé and Ottawa Senators forward Daniel Alfredsson, who ultimately won the award.

On November 23, 1996, Jovanovski received a three-game suspension from the NHL without pay. In a game against the Dallas Stars the previous night, he illegally left the penalty box ready to fight any opposing players during a break in play. Later in the season, he suffered a knee injury during a game against the Edmonton Oilers in January 1997, sidelining him for several weeks. The following month, he was involved in an on-ice altercation with San Jose Sharks forward Bernie Nicholls, resulting in a two-game suspension and the maximum $1,000 fine for Nicholls for intent to injure. The accumulated injuries and suspensions caused Jovanovski to miss 21 games in his second NHL season. He scored seven goals and 23 points over 61 contests.

In 1997–98, Jovanovski appeared in 81 games, recording nine goals and 23 points. With his contract set to expire following the 1998–99 season, Jovanovski was beginning to be seen as a disappointment in Florida, failing to improve on his successful rookie year.

=== Vancouver Canucks (1999–2006) ===
On January 17, 1999, after three-and-a-half seasons with the Panthers, Jovanovski was traded in a seven-player deal to the Vancouver Canucks. He was sent with Dave Gagner, Mike Brown, Kevin Weekes and a first-round draft pick in 2000 (Nathan Smith) in exchange for Pavel Bure, Bret Hedican, Brad Ference and a third-round pick in 2000 (Robert Fried). Joining the Canucks in the midst of a rebuilding period for the franchise, Jovanovski quickly established himself as a top defenceman in Vancouver's lineup. His ability to join the rush as a defenceman complemented the Canucks' up-tempo style of play.

A month following his trade, Jovanovski suffered a broken foot while blocking a shot in a game against the New Jersey Devils on February 9, 1999. Later in the season, he was involved in an altercation with Montreal Canadiens forward Shayne Corson. After being high-sticked in the face by Corson, the two players were sent off the ice, at which point Corson entered the Canucks' dressing room to verbally confront Jovanovski. According to Corson, the feud stemmed from comments Jovanovski had said about his family. As a result of entering the Canucks' dressing room, the Canadiens forward was later suspended five games by the NHL, in addition to one game for the high-sticking infraction. In 31 games with the Canucks that season, Jovanovski recorded two goals and 11 points. Combined with his games played with the Panthers, he totalled 27 points in 72 games.

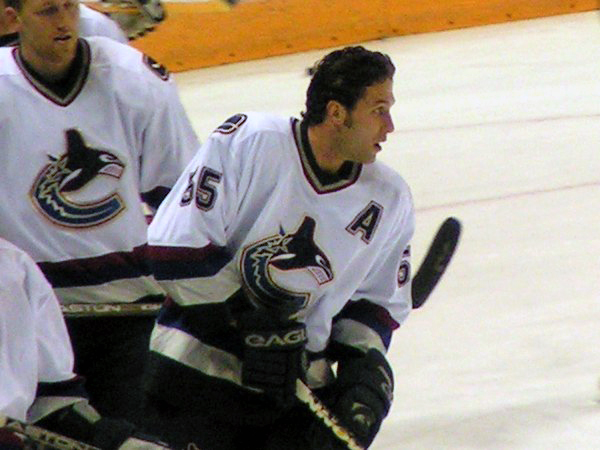
Jovanovski in April 2004

In his first full season with Vancouver, Jovanovski tallied five goals and 26 points (first among team defencemen) over 75 games. He also ranked second among team defencemen in average ice time per game, behind only Mattias Öhlund. The following season, in 2000–01, he led all team defencemen with 12 goals and 47 points over 79 games. He was then named to his first of three consecutive NHL All-Star Games in 2001. At the end of the season, he also earned his first of three consecutive Babe Pratt Trophies, awarded annually to the Canucks' fan-voted best defenceman. Jovanovski's offensive emergence helped the Canucks return to the playoffs after a six-year absence. It also marked Jovanovski's first playoff season since 1997.

In 2001–02, Jovanovski scored a career-high 17 goals, ranking second amongst all NHL defencemen. His 48 points ranked sixth among NHL defencemen and was his highest total as a Canuck. The Canucks finished as the eighth seed in the Western Conference for the second consecutive season, and were eliminated by the Detroit Red Wings in the opening round of the 2002 playoffs. Jovanovski contributed a goal and five points in six post-season games.

Midway through the following season, he was re-signed by the Canucks to a three-year contract extension on January 27, 2003. The day after signing, he injured his foot, sidelining him for 14 games. Despite his season being shortened by injury, he recorded a career-high 40 assists to go with six goals in 2002–03. His 46 points ranked tenth overall in the League amongst defencemen, and it marked the fourth consecutive year he led Canucks defencemen in scoring. Jovanovski added eight points in 14 post-season games before the Canucks were eliminated in the second round by the Minnesota Wild. His seven goals led all League defencemen in playoff scoring.

Midway through the 2003–04 season, Jovanovski suffered a third-degree shoulder separation during a game against the Nashville Predators on January 25, 2004. Colliding with opposing forward Martin Erat, he fell to ice and slid into the rink boards. He returned late in the season to help the Canucks secure the Northwest Division title. In 56 games, he scored seven goals and 23 points. Adding four assists in seven 2004 playoff games, the Canucks were defeated in the first round by the Calgary Flames.

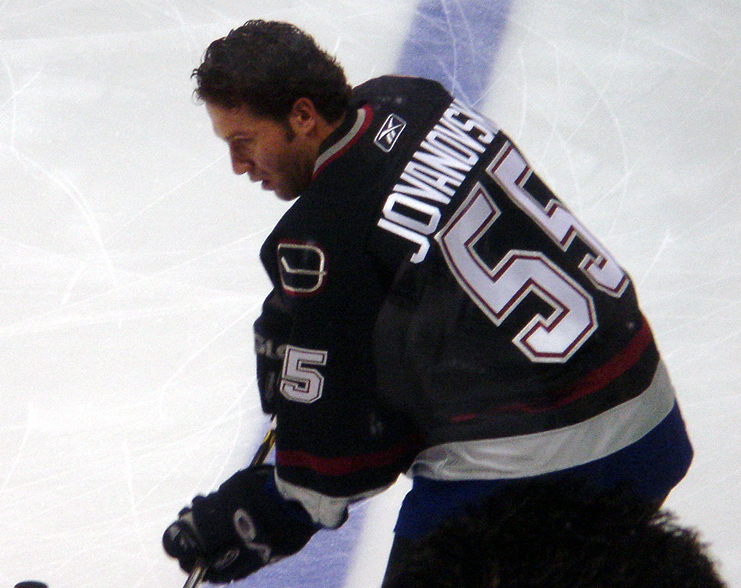
Jovanovski in the 2005–06 season opener

Due to the NHL lockout, as well as rib and knee injuries sustained during the 2004 World Cup, Jovanovski was inactive during the 2004–05 season. When the NHL resumed play in 2005–06, Jovanovski was on pace for a career year, but his season was interrupted by groin, foot and abdominal injuries. He finished with 33 points in 44 games for a career-high 0.75 points-per-game average. The Canucks suffered from Jovanovski missing the final 27 games of the season and did not qualify for the 2006 playoffs. Following the 2005–06 season, Jovanovski did not receive a contract offer from the Canucks, subsequently becoming an unrestricted free agent. The decision to let him go was influenced by the re-signings of Daniel and Henrik Sedin, as well as the acquisition of goaltender Roberto Luongo, leaving no room on the team's salary cap to retain Jovanovski.

=== Phoenix Coyotes (2006–2011) ===
On July 1, 2006, Jovanovski joined the Phoenix Coyotes, signing a five-year, $32.5 million contract. Having received a contract offer from the Panthers, he was speculated to return to Florida, where he spent his summers. He cited being coached by Wayne Gretzky as a strong factor for choosing Phoenix. Jovanovski was named to his fourth NHL All-Star Game in the subsequent season, but continued to be plagued with injuries. He missed the last 22 games of the 2006–07 regular season with an abdominal injury, limiting him to 29 points (first among Coyotes defencemen) in 54 games. The Coyotes finished last in the Western Conference with 31 wins and 67 points.

In 2007–08, Jovanovski recorded a career-high 51 points (12 goals and 39 assists), which tied for tenth among League defencemen and led all Coyotes defencemen. It was also the second-highest total for a defenceman in Coyotes history (Note: Not franchise history, which would include Winnipeg Jets players from 1972 to 1996.) after Oleg Tverdovsky's 55-point year in 1996–97. Jovanovski's career season included a one-game suspension on December 1, 2007, for a hit to the head of Minnesota Wild forward Marián Gáborík. Jovanovski also appeared in his second consecutive All-Star Game in 2008. The team continued to struggle, however, as they ranked 12th in the West, eight points out of a 2008 playoff spot. The following season, Jovanovski's offensive production dipped to 36 points in 82 games. Although it was his lowest total since his third season with the Panthers in 1997–98 (not including seasons with major injuries), he still led all Coyotes defencemen in scoring for the third consecutive year. On a team basis, he missed the playoffs with Phoenix for the third-straight year, as they finished 13th in the West.

Early in the 2009–10 season, Jovanovski missed ten games with a lower-body injury in November and December 2009. Shortly after returning to the Coyotes lineup, he was suspended for two games by the NHL for a hit to the head of Minnesota Wild forward Andrew Ebbett with his forearm on December 7, 2009. The following month, he received another two-game suspension for elbowing New York Islanders rookie forward John Tavares in the head. Over 66 games during the season, he notched 10 goals and 34 points. He was overtaken as the team's top-scoring defenceman by Keith Yandle, who had scored 41 points. While the season was marked with an uncertain future for the Coyotes from a business perspective, as the franchise had filed for bankruptcy in May 2009 and was taken over by the NHL, the team performed well and recorded their best season in history. With 50 wins and 107 points (a 28-point improval from the previous season), they finished with the third best record in the West and came within five points of a Pacific Division and Conference title, trailing only the San Jose Sharks. Facing the Detroit Red Wings in the opening round, the Coyotes were eliminated in seven games. Jovanovski had one goal and no assists in his first NHL playoffs since 2004.

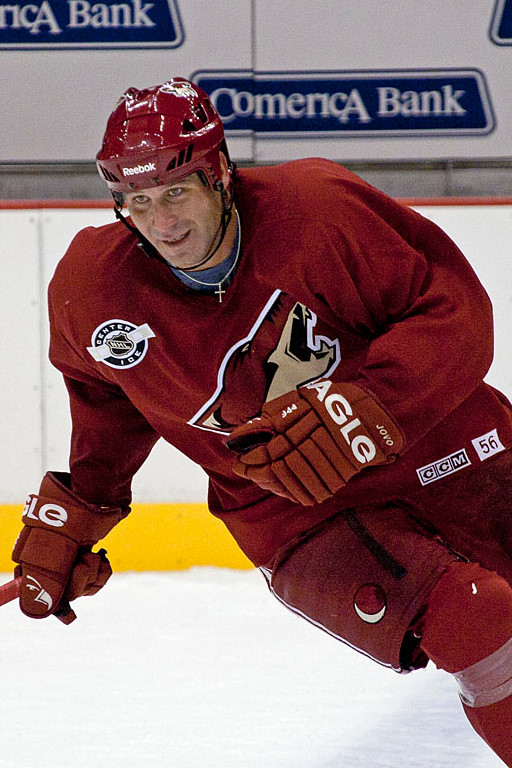
With the Coyotes in 2010.

In the first month of the 2010–11 season, Jovanovski was chosen to serve in place of the suspended Shane Doan as team captain from October 21 to 25, 2010. Over a week later, he recorded his first career NHL hat-trick in a 4–3 win against the Nashville Predators on November 3. He scored all three goals against goaltender Pekka Rinne, becoming the first Coyotes defenceman to score a hat-trick in team history. On December 26, he became the 256th player in NHL history to play 1,000 career games, reaching the feat against the Dallas Stars. Jovanovski struggled with injuries throughout the season, missing time on six occasions. His most serious injury was an orbital bone fracture after his face collided with an opposing player's helmet in a game against the Atlanta Thrashers on February 17, 2011. After missing 20 games with the injury, he returned in April for the last three games of the regular season and the playoffs. In Jovanovski's limited time in the season, he recorded 14 points over 50 games. The Coyotes ranked sixth in the West, drawing the Red Wings in the first round for the second consecutive year. Jovanovski recorded one assist in the post-season as the Coyotes were eliminated in four games.

=== Return to Florida (2011–2014) ===
Jovanovski signed a four-year, $16.5 million contract to return to the Florida Panthers on July 1, 2011. He played a large role in helping reshape the franchise's rebuilding and drive to make the playoffs. Panthers coach Kevin Dineen named Jovanovski captain for the 2012–13 but it would prove to be a very frustrating season for him and the team. A nagging hip injury kept him on the sidelines and limited him to just six games before a season ending surgery shut him down with the team sitting in last place. After a ten-month recovery, Jovanovski returned to the ice in January 2014 and played 37 games for Florida. He had intended to play out the final year of his contract and retire, but the Panthers instead chose to buy out the remaining year of his contract on June 29, 2014. Florida's General Manager at the time, Dave Tallon, made it clear that buying out his captain was a tough call to make.

Jovanovski remained inactive in the NHL during the 2014–15 season and on December 28, 2015, he announced his retirement from the NHL.

== International play ==
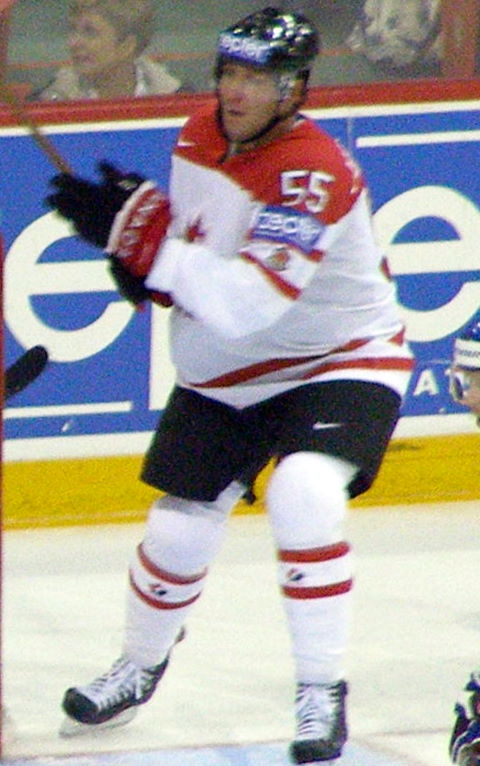
Jovanovski at the 2008 World Championships

Jovanovski competed for Canada's under-20 team at the 1995 World Junior Championships, held in Alberta. Scoring two goals in seven games, he helped Canada go undefeated to win gold. Following his NHL rookie season, he was named as a reserve to the Canadian men's team for the 1996 World Cup. The youngest player on the roster, he played in one exhibition game against Russia, a 4–4 tie, but did not appear in any main tournament games as Canada lost in the final to the United States.

Two years later, Jovanovski competed at the 1998 World Championships in Switzerland; he was the second-youngest named to the Canadian squad. He scored two goals and an assist over six games as Canada failed to qualify past the crossover round. He made his second World Championships appearance at the 2000 tournament in Russia. He scored a goal and an assist over nine games. Canada lost the semifinal, however, 2–1 to the Czech Republic, then lost the bronze medal game 2–1 to Finland.

In December 2001, Jovanovski was chosen to Canada's Olympic team for the 2002 Games in Salt Lake City. Playing the United States in the gold medal game, Jovanovski earned an assist on the game-winning goal, backhanding a saucer pass from the opposition's blueline to Joe Sakic on a five-on-three power play advantage. Canada went on to win the gold medal, 5–2. Jovanovski had three points, all assists, in total.

Prior to the 2004–05 NHL lockout, Jovanovski played for Canada at the 2004 World Cup. He suffered a cracked rib and a second degree sprain on his medial collateral ligament (MCL) during the first game against the United States, sidelining him for the rest of the tournament. He was replaced by San Jose Sharks defenceman Scott Hannan in the lineup. Canada went on to win the championship over Finland in the final.

The following year, he competed at the 2005 World Championships in Austria. In the semi-final, Jovanovski scored the game-winning goal against Russia in a 4–3 win. Advancing to the gold medal game, Canada lost 3–0 to the Czech Republic, thus earning silver. He finished the tournament with a goal and two assists over nine games. Later that year, he was named to his second Canadian Olympic team for the 2006 Games in Turin, but was not able to play due to a lower abdominal injury.

Making his fourth World Championships appearance in 2008, Jovanovski earned a second-straight silver medal. He recorded one assist over nine games as Canada lost in the gold medal game by a 5–4 score in overtime to Russia.

== Playing style ==
Jovanovski was known as a two-way defenceman. Able to contribute offensively, he was an adept puck-carrier and joined plays deep in the opposing team's zone. He played defence physically, bodychecking opponents primarily with his shoulder. In both aspects of his game, he was regarded as playing with a high level of risk, taking the chance to be out of position in favour of a good scoring chance or bodycheck.

== Personal life ==
Jovanovski was born in Windsor, Ontario, to Kostadin and Lilja Jovanovski. His parents immigrated to Canada in 1973 from Macedonia. Coming from an athletic family, Kostadin was a semi-professional soccer player in Yugoslavia. Jovanovski speaks English, French and some Macedonian. Jovanovski followed after his father and played organized soccer growing up. He did not start playing hockey until age 11, when his older brother, Denny, joined a team.

During his junior career, Jovanovski and two other Windsor Spitfire teammates were charged with sexually assaulting a 24-year-old woman in February 1995. After a pre-trial hearing in June, the Crown attorney dropped the charges in August due to a lack of convincing evidence.

Beginning his NHL career with the Florida Panthers, he owned a condominium in Boca Raton, Florida. He met his wife, Kirstin, in Florida and retained a residence in Boca Raton, where he spent his summers. Jovanovski and Kirstin had their first child, daughter Kylie Everett, on August 25, 1998. Three years later, Kyra was born on April 24, 2001, while her twin sister died in utero. Kirstin was later pregnant with twins a second time and gave birth to son Cole and daughter Coco on May 25, 2006, in Florida.

In 2005, Jovanovski was featured in a documentary aired on multicultural network Omni Television. Entitled The Late Bloomer: Ed Jovanovski, it explored his career, family tragedy and attachments to his Macedonian heritage.

== Career statistics ==
=== Regular season and playoffs ===
			Regular season					Playoffs
Season	Team	League	GP	G	A	Pts	PIM	GP	G	A	Pts	PIM
1992–93	Windsor Bulldogs	WOHL	48	7	46	53	88	—	—	—	—	—
1993–94	Windsor Spitfires	OHL	62	15	35	50	221	4	0	0	0	15
1994–95	Windsor Spitfires	OHL	50	23	42	65	198	9	2	7	9	39
1995–96	Florida Panthers	NHL	70	10	11	21	137	22	1	8	9	52
1996–97	Florida Panthers	NHL	61	7	16	23	172	5	0	0	0	4
1997–98	Florida Panthers	NHL	81	9	14	23	158	—	—	—	—	—
1998–99	Florida Panthers	NHL	41	3	13	16	82	—	—	—	—	—
1998–99	Vancouver Canucks	NHL	31	2	9	11	44	—	—	—	—	—
1999–00	Vancouver Canucks	NHL	75	5	21	26	54	—	—	—	—	—
2000–01	Vancouver Canucks	NHL	79	12	35	47	102	4	1	1	2	0
2001–02	Vancouver Canucks	NHL	82	17	31	48	101	6	1	4	5	8
2002–03	Vancouver Canucks	NHL	67	6	40	46	13	14	7	1	8	22
2003–04	Vancouver Canucks	NHL	56	7	16	23	64	7	0	4	4	6
2005–06	Vancouver Canucks	NHL	44	8	25	33	58	—	—	—	—	—
2006–07	Phoenix Coyotes	NHL	54	11	18	29	63	—	—	—	—	—
2007–08	Phoenix Coyotes	NHL	80	12	39	51	73	—	—	—	—	—
2008–09	Phoenix Coyotes	NHL	82	9	27	36	106	—	—	—	—	—
2009–10	Phoenix Coyotes	NHL	66	10	24	34	55	7	1	0	1	4
2010–11	Phoenix Coyotes	NHL	50	5	9	14	39	4	0	1	1	2
2011–12	Florida Panthers	NHL	66	3	10	13	31	7	0	0	0	4
2012–13	Florida Panthers	NHL	6	0	1	1	0	—	—	—	—	—
2013–14	Florida Panthers	NHL	37	1	4	5	39	—	—	—	—	—
NHL totals			1,128	137	363	500	1,491	76	11	19	30	102

=== International ===
Year	Team	Event	GP	G	A	Pts	PIM
1995	Canada	WJC	7	2	0	2	4
1998	Canada	WC	6	2	1	3	6
2000	Canada	WC	9	1	1	2	8
2002	Canada	OLY	6	0	3	3	4
2004	Canada	WCH	1	0	0	0	0
2005	Canada	WC	9	1	2	3	8
2008	Canada	WC	9	0	1	1	4
Junior totals			7	2	0	2	4
Senior totals			40	4	7	11	30

== Awards ==
=== OHL ===
Award	Year
All-Rookie Team	1994
Second All-Star Team	1994
First All-Star Team	1995

=== NHL ===
Award	Year
All-Rookie Team	1996
Calder Memorial Trophy Runner-up	1996
All-Star Game	2001, 2002, 2003, 2007, 2008

=== Vancouver Canucks ===
Award	Year
Babe Pratt Trophy (Canucks' best defenceman)	2001, 2002, 2003

== See also ==
- List of NHL players with 1,000 games played

== Footnotes ==
Awards and achievements
Preceded by Alexandre Daigle	NHL first overall draft pick 1994	Succeeded by Bryan Berard
Preceded by Rob Niedermayer	Florida Panthers first-round draft pick 1994	Succeeded by Radek Dvorak
Preceded by Bryan McCabe	Florida Panthers captain 2013–14	Succeeded by Willie Mitchell
