= Mattias Öhlund =

Swedish ice hockey player (born 1976)

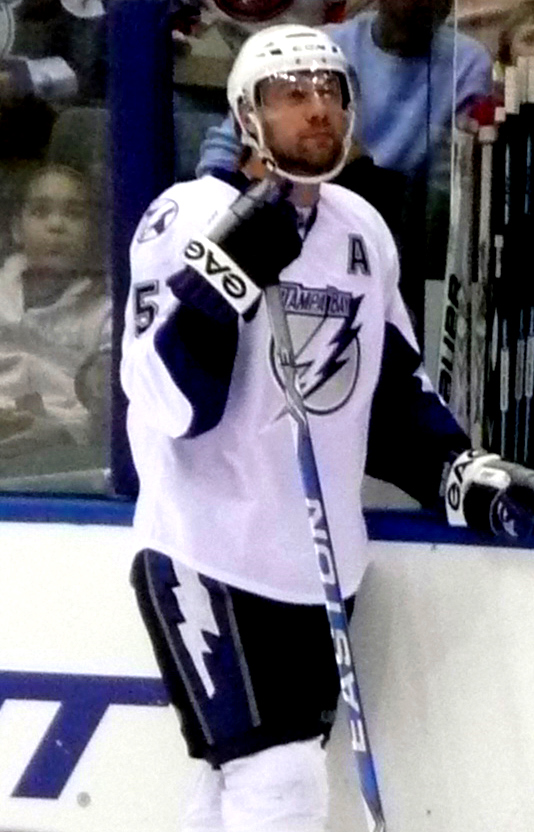
- Öhlund with the Tampa Bay Lightning in December 2009
- Born: 9 September 1976 (age 50) Piteå, Sweden
- Height: 6 ft 4 in (193 cm)
- Weight: 233 lb (106 kg; 16 st 9 lb)
- Position: Defence
- Shot: Left
- Played for: Luleå HF; Vancouver Canucks; Tampa Bay Lightning
- National team: Sweden
- NHL draft: 13th overall, 1994; Vancouver Canucks
- Playing career: 1992–2011
Medal record
Representing Sweden
Ice hockey
Olympic Games
Gold medal – first place	2006 Turin
World Championships
Gold medal – first place	1998 Switzerland
Silver medal – second place	1997 Finland
Bronze medal – third place	2001 Germany
World Junior Championships
Silver medal – second place	1994 Czech Republic
Silver medal – second place	1996 United States
Bronze medal – third place	1995 Canada

Kenneth Mattias Öhlund (born 9 September 1976) is a Swedish former professional ice hockey player who was a defenceman in the National Hockey League (NHL) for the Vancouver Canucks and Tampa Bay Lightning. Öhlund played two seasons in the Swedish Allsvenskan, the second highest tier of hockey in Sweden, with Piteå HC before being selected by the Canucks 13th overall in the 1994 NHL entry draft. He then joined Luleå HF of the Elitserien, the highest league in Sweden, winning the Le Mat Trophy as league champions in 1996. He began his NHL career with Vancouver in 1997–98, the start of an eleven-year tenure with the club in which he became the Canucks' all-time leader in points for a defenceman (since surpassed by Quinn Hughes). Öhlund would play the final two seasons of his professional career with the Tampa Bay Lightning before retiring in 2011. A serious eye injury before his third NHL season was the first of many injuries Öhlund has sustained over his career, and he only played a full season twice in his 13-year NHL career.

Internationally, Öhlund represented Sweden in numerous tournaments, beginning with three World Junior Championships that included Best Defenceman honours as part of a silver medal effort in 1996. He has since competed in three World Championships, earning gold in 1998, and three Olympic Games, earning gold in 2006.

== Playing career ==
=== Sweden ===
Öhlund began his playing career with Piteå HC in his hometown, playing two seasons with the team. As a large, mobile defenceman, he was heavily scouted by scouts from several NHL teams during his final season with Piteå. He was the Vancouver Canucks' first pick, 13th overall, in the 1994 NHL entry draft. Rather than join the Canucks, Öhlund stayed in Sweden as a result of a dispute over his contract with the team. He joined a new team, Luleå HF of the top-flight Elitserien. In his first Elitserien season, he scored 16 points in 34 games. The following season, he scored 14 points in 38 games as Luleå HF won the Le Mat Trophy as champions of the Elitserien, their first league championship. Appearing in 47 games with Luleå during the 1996–97 season, Öhlund recorded seven goals and nine assists.

=== Vancouver Canucks ===
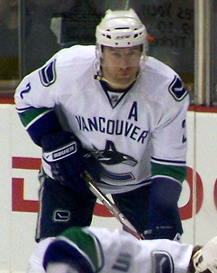
Öhlund on the road with Vancouver in March 2009

Four years after being drafted by the Canucks, Öhlund was set to be eligible to re-enter the NHL entry draft when he signed a contract with the Toronto Maple Leafs on August 1, 1997. Worth US$10 million over five years, including a signing bonus of $7.5 million, it was considerably more than the maximum rookie contract of $850,000 per year the Canucks, as the team that drafted Öhlund, were allowed to offer. Under league rules, the Canucks were given one week to either match the contract or trade Öhlund's NHL rights to the Maple Leafs. Rather than lose him, the Canucks agreed to the contract on August 7.

As part of a promotion for the 1998 Winter Olympics, the first to allow NHL participation in the ice hockey tournament, the Canucks opened the 1997–98 season with a pair of games against the Mighty Ducks of Anaheim in Tokyo. Öhlund thus played his first NHL game in Japan on October 3, 1997. He scored his first goal against Félix Potvin of the Toronto Maple Leafs on October 9, as well as earning his first assist in that game. Playing 77 games as a rookie, he tied Jyrki Lumme for the team lead in scoring among defencemen with 7 goals and 30 points. In recognition of his play during the season, he was awarded the Babe Pratt Trophy, given to the Canucks' best defenceman. In addition, Öhlund was nominated for the Calder Memorial Trophy as the best rookie in the league, finishing second in voting to Sergei Samsonov of the Boston Bruins with 11 first-place ballots to Samsonov's 43. His 30 points, the fifth best total among first year players and highest by a rookie defenceman, helped him earn a position on the NHL All-Rookie Team.

In his second season in the NHL, Öhlund was selected to the annual NHL All-Star Game as a replacement for an injured player. Playing for the World team, composed of NHLers from outside North America, Öhlund scored one goal and had an assist as the North American team won, 8–6. With 9 goals and 35 points in 74 games, Öhlund led the Canucks' defencemen in scoring and placed fifth overall on the team.

Prior to the start of the 1999–2000 season, in a pre-season game against the Ottawa Senators on September 21, 1999, a puck deflected off Öhlund's stick and struck him in the right eye. The injury forced Öhlund to miss the first 38 games of the season. He underwent surgery to correct his vision and returned to the Canucks the same season and scored 20 points in 42 games, again winning the Babe Pratt Trophy as the Canucks' best defenceman. The following year, he missed an additional 17 games after undergoing surgery once more to relieve building internal pressure on his eye. Playing in his first game back in the lineup on November 28, 2000, Öhlund scored the game-winning goal for the Canucks in a 4–1 win over the Mighty Ducks of Anaheim. Öhlund played the final 65 games of the season, scoring 8 goals and 28 points. He also made his Stanley Cup playoffs debut, recording four points in four games.

The 2001–02 season saw Öhlund play 81 games and record a career-high 36 points, with an additional two points in six playoff games. A knee injury during the 2002–03 season led Öhlund to miss several games; while he only scored 2 goals in the 59 games he played in, Öhlund set a career-high in assists with 27. That was followed by appearing in a career-high 13 playoff games, where he had three goals and four assists for seven points. In 2003–04, Öhlund tallied a career-high 14 goals and played in all 82 games with Vancouver for the first time in his career. For his efforts, Öhlund was named the winner of the Babe Pratt Trophy.

The 2004–05 season was cancelled due to the 2004–05 NHL lockout. Like many other NHL players, Öhlund played in Europe, joining his former team, Luleå HF, on December 21. However, eight days later, after playing two games with the team and scoring one goal, Öhlund left the team. As well as briefly playing in Sweden, Öhlund took part in a charity hockey match set up by Canucks teammate Brad May and held in Vancouver on December 12, 2004. Including several NHL players, the game raised nearly $1 million for charity. The NHL resumed play for the 2005–06 season; Öhlund recorded 33 points in 78 games, including leading Canucks defencemen with 13 goals, winning the Babe Pratt Trophy for the fourth time in his career.

Early in the 2007–08 season, Öhlund received a four-game suspension, the first of his career, for an incident near the end of a November 16, 2007, game against the Minnesota Wild. In the third period, Wild forward Mikko Koivu hit Öhlund, and Öhlund retaliated by slashing Koivu in the leg with his stick, breaking Koivu's fibula. After returning from the suspension, Öhlund became the Canucks' all-time leader in goals among defencemen, scoring the game-tying goal against the Edmonton Oilers on December 15, 2007, to pass former teammate Jyrki Lumme with 84 goals. After bone chips were detected in his knee in early March 2008, Öhlund underwent knee surgery on March 13 and missed the remainder of the season. The leading scorer amongst Canucks defencemen at the time of the surgery, Öhlund finished second amongst the defencemen with 24 points in 53 games.

With the departure of Markus Näslund in the 2008 off-season, Öhlund became the longest serving player on the Canucks' roster. Before the beginning of the 2008–09 season, Öhlund was named (along with Ryan Kesler and Willie Mitchell) as alternate captains to goaltender Roberto Luongo, who replaced Näslund as captain. Due to the limitations of having a goalie as captain, Öhlund was designated the captain's traditional duty of taking ceremonial faceoffs. Beginning the season 22 points behind Jyrki Lumme and Dennis Kearns for the franchise's all-time point-scoring record for a defenceman, Öhlund surpassed the mark on March 15, 2009, with an assist in a 4–2 win against the Colorado Avalanche for his 322nd point as a Canuck. He played all 82 games for the second time in his career, and finished tied for third on the team for points by a defenceman with 25.

Over 11 seasons with the Canucks, Öhlund registered team records of 93 goals and 325 points as a defenceman (both since passed by Alexander Edler). His 232 assists ranked fourth among all-time Canucks defencemen, while his 770 games played was second among defencemen and fifth overall. In his latter years with the Canucks, Öhlund served as a mentor while being paired with fellow defenceman and Swedish native Alexander Edler, who was beginning his NHL career.

=== Tampa Bay Lightning ===
Becoming an unrestricted free agent in the off-season, Öhlund signed a seven-year, $26.25 million contract with the Tampa Bay Lightning on July 1, 2009. Brought in as a mentor to fellow Swedish defenceman Victor Hedman, whom the Lightning drafted second overall in the 2009 NHL entry draft, Öhlund was named an alternate captain of the Lightning. His first game with the Lightning was on October 3, 2009, against the Atlanta Thrashers; Öhlund had one assist on a Martin St. Louis goal in the game where the Lightning lost 6–3. The following month, he suffered an ankle injury after catching his skate into ice during a game against the Los Angeles Kings on November 14, 2009. He returned after missing seven games. He re-injured the ankle on 11 March 2010 after colliding with Christian Hanson during a game against the Toronto Maple Leafs, causing him to miss an additional eight games. Öhlund finished his first season with the Lightning with no goals and 13 assists in 67 games. Offensively, it marked the lowest point total of his career and the first time he did not score a goal during the regular season during his NHL career up to that point. Despite his reduced offensive statistics, he remained a key defenceman on the Lightning roster, leading the team with 22 minutes and 47 seconds of average ice time per game and 116 blocked shots.

In the off-season, Öhlund underwent arthroscopic surgery on his right knee. Though he aggravated the knee at the beginning of the Lightning's training camp in September 2010, he continued to play in pre-season games. However, due to inflammation and fluid build-up in the knee, he was sidelined for the first eight games of the 2010–11 season. Later in the season, he began suffering from a deep bone bruise on his left knee that he continued to play in spite of. In late-February and early-March 2011, he was subsequently sidelined two games with a lower-body injury. Öhlund failed to score a goal for the second consecutive regular season in 2010–11, recording five assists in 72 games, a career-low. His ice time reduced significantly as he ranked sixth among team defencemen with an average of 18 minutes and 43 seconds per game. After finishing 12th overall in the Eastern Conference the previous season, the Lightning qualified for the 2011 playoffs as the fifth seed. In Game 2 of the opening round against the Pittsburgh Penguins, Öhlund registered his first goal with the Lightning, scoring into an empty net in a 5–1 win. He added two assists over the course of a career-high 18 playoff games as Tampa Bay was eliminated by the eventual Stanley Cup champion Boston Bruins in Game 7 of the Eastern Conference Finals. In an interview the following year, Öhlund recalled the 2010–11 season as "the most fun [he] had playing hockey, ever".

Prior to the start of the 2011–12 season, Öhlund began experiencing inflammation in his right knee. The Lightning placed him on injured reserve on October 4, 2011; a week later, he underwent arthroscopic surgery on both knees. After there was optimism he was close to returning to the lineup in December, he suffered a setback with his left knee and underwent further surgery in February 2012. (Note: Ohlund's setback resulted from the wearing down of the cartliage in his patellofemoral joint. The surgery resurfaced Öhlund's femur behind his knee cap with a layer of titanium.) During his recovery, he told reporters with Swedish newspaper Expressen that he was unsure whether he could continue playing.

His contract with the Lightning expired July 1, 2016. He was until that date listed on the team roster but was on injured reserve since 2011, with hockey experts citing him alongside Chris Pronger and Marc Savard as players who have not officially retired while letting their contracts continue, but who will not play in the NHL again.

"For a long period of time I've been trying to get better and better, but clearly the longer you don't play, the likelihood of playing again gets smaller and smaller each day, especially at my age," Öhlund told the Tampa Tribune in April 2013. "I don't know long term what my situation will be, but I'm sure it will be figured out shortly."

Öhlund was inducted into the Canucks' Ring of Honour on December 16, 2016.

== International play ==
Early in his career, Öhlund was selected to play in three World Junior Championships for Sweden. Beginning in 1994, he contributed two assists in seven games as part of a silver medal effort. As the medals were determined by a round-robin format, Sweden fell one point short of Canada, losing 6–4 to them in their final and deciding game. After a bronze medal in 1995, Öhlund returned for a third straight World Junior tournament in 1996 to record five assists and was named the tournament's Best Defenceman. He was additionally named to the Tournament All-Star Team as he captured his second World Junior silver medal.

Öhlund made his debut for the Swedish senior national team in 1997 at the World Championships, his first of three appearances in the tournament. He scored 2 goals and added 1 assist in 11 games as Sweden captured a silver medal. He returned the following year in 1998 to match his previous statistical output while earning his first gold medal with Sweden. In his third World Championship appearance, the 2001 World Championships, Öhlund tallied five points to help Sweden to a bronze medal.

The 1998 Winter Olympics was the first of three consecutive Olympic games Öhlund appeared in. He played in all four games for Sweden and registered one assist as Sweden finished in a tie for fifth place, out of medal contention. Four years later, Öhlund was selected for the 2002 Winter Olympics in Salt Lake City. However, in pre-Olympic drug testing by the International Olympic Committee (IOC), Öhlund tested positive for the banned substance acetazolamide. The substance was inadvertently ingested after Öhlund took Diamox, a drug he had used previously while undergoing eye surgery. As the ingestion was unintentional, he was cleared to play. After a dominant round-robin, Sweden was eliminated by Belarus in the quarter-final game, considered one of the biggest upsets in international hockey history and the darkest moment in Swedish hockey history. Öhlund finished the tournament with two points in four games.

In the following Olympics, Öhlund helped Sweden to the 2006 gold medal in Turin. After earning two assists in six games, Öhlund was forced out of the tournament after getting hit into the boards and fracturing his ribs during a game against Switzerland. Unable to play in the final against Finland, he nevertheless received a gold medal from the IOC. Canucks teammates Daniel and Henrik Sedin, who also played on the championship team, offered to give Öhlund one of their gold medals if the IOC would not give him one, while his replacement on the team, Niklas Kronwall, made the same offer.

Additionally, Öhlund competed in the 2004 World Cup of Hockey, which preceded the 2004–05 NHL lockout. In four games, he recorded one goal and one assist.

== Personal life ==
Growing up in Piteå, Öhlund idolised fellow Swedish defenceman Börje Salming, who played 17 seasons in the NHL. He is married to wife Linda and has a daughter, Hannah, and a son, Viktor. They reside in Tampa during the hockey season, and return to Piteå during the summer.

== Career statistics ==
=== Regular season and playoffs ===
			Regular season					Playoffs
Season	Team	League	GP	G	A	Pts	PIM	GP	G	A	Pts	PIM
1992–93	Piteå HC	SWE II	22	0	6	6	16	—	—	—	—	—
1993–94	Piteå HC	SWE II	28	7	10	17	66	—	—	—	—	—
1994–95	Luleå HF	SEL	34	6	10	16	34	9	4	0	4	16
1995–96	Luleå HF	SEL	38	4	10	14	26	13	1	0	1	47
1996–97	Luleå HF	SEL	47	7	9	16	38	10	1	2	3	8
1997–98	Vancouver Canucks	NHL	77	7	23	30	76	—	—	—	—	—
1998–99	Vancouver Canucks	NHL	74	9	26	35	83	—	—	—	—	—
1999–2000	Vancouver Canucks	NHL	42	4	16	20	24	—	—	—	—	—
2000–01	Vancouver Canucks	NHL	65	8	20	28	46	4	1	3	4	6
2001–02	Vancouver Canucks	NHL	81	10	26	36	56	6	1	1	2	6
2002–03	Vancouver Canucks	NHL	59	2	27	29	42	13	3	4	7	12
2003–04	Vancouver Canucks	NHL	82	14	20	34	73	7	1	4	5	13
2004–05	Luleå HF	SEL	2	1	0	1	4	—	—	—	—	—
2005–06	Vancouver Canucks	NHL	78	13	20	33	92	—	—	—	—	—
2006–07	Vancouver Canucks	NHL	77	11	20	31	80	12	2	5	7	12
2007–08	Vancouver Canucks	NHL	53	9	15	24	79	—	—	—	—	—
2008–09	Vancouver Canucks	NHL	82	6	19	25	105	10	1	2	3	6
2009–10	Tampa Bay Lightning	NHL	67	0	13	13	59	—	—	—	—	—
2010–11	Tampa Bay Lightning	NHL	72	0	5	5	70	18	1	2	3	8
SEL totals			121	18	29	47	102	32	6	2	8	46
NHL totals			909	93	250	343	885	70	10	21	31	63

=== International ===
Year	Team	Event	GP	G	A	Pts	PIM
1994	Sweden	EJC	5	0	6	6	8
1994	Sweden	WJC	7	0	2	2	2
1995	Sweden	WJC	3	1	0	1	4
1996	Sweden	WJC	7	0	5	5	32
1997	Sweden	WC	11	2	1	3	12
1998	Sweden	Oly	4	0	1	1	4
1998	Sweden	WC	10	2	1	3	8
2001	Sweden	WC	9	2	3	5	12
2002	Sweden	Oly	4	0	2	2	2
2004	Sweden	WCH	4	1	0	1	0
2006	Sweden	Oly	6	0	2	2	2
2010	Sweden	Oly	4	1	0	1	2
Junior totals			22	1	13	14	46
Senior totals			52	8	10	18	42

=== All-Star Games ===
Year	Location	G	A	P
1999	Tampa	1	1	2
All-Star totals		1	1	2

- All stats taken from NHL.com

== Awards ==
=== NHL ===
Award	Year(s)
NHL All-Rookie Team	1998

=== International ===
Award	Year
World Junior Championships Best Defenceman	1996
World Junior Championships All-Star Team	1996

=== Vancouver Canucks team awards ===
Award	Year
Babe Pratt Trophy	1998, 2000, 2004, 2006

== Notes ==
Awards and achievements
Preceded by Mike Wilson	Vancouver Canucks first-round draft pick 1994	Succeeded by Josh Holden
