= Christian Ehrhoff =

German ice hockey player (born 1982)

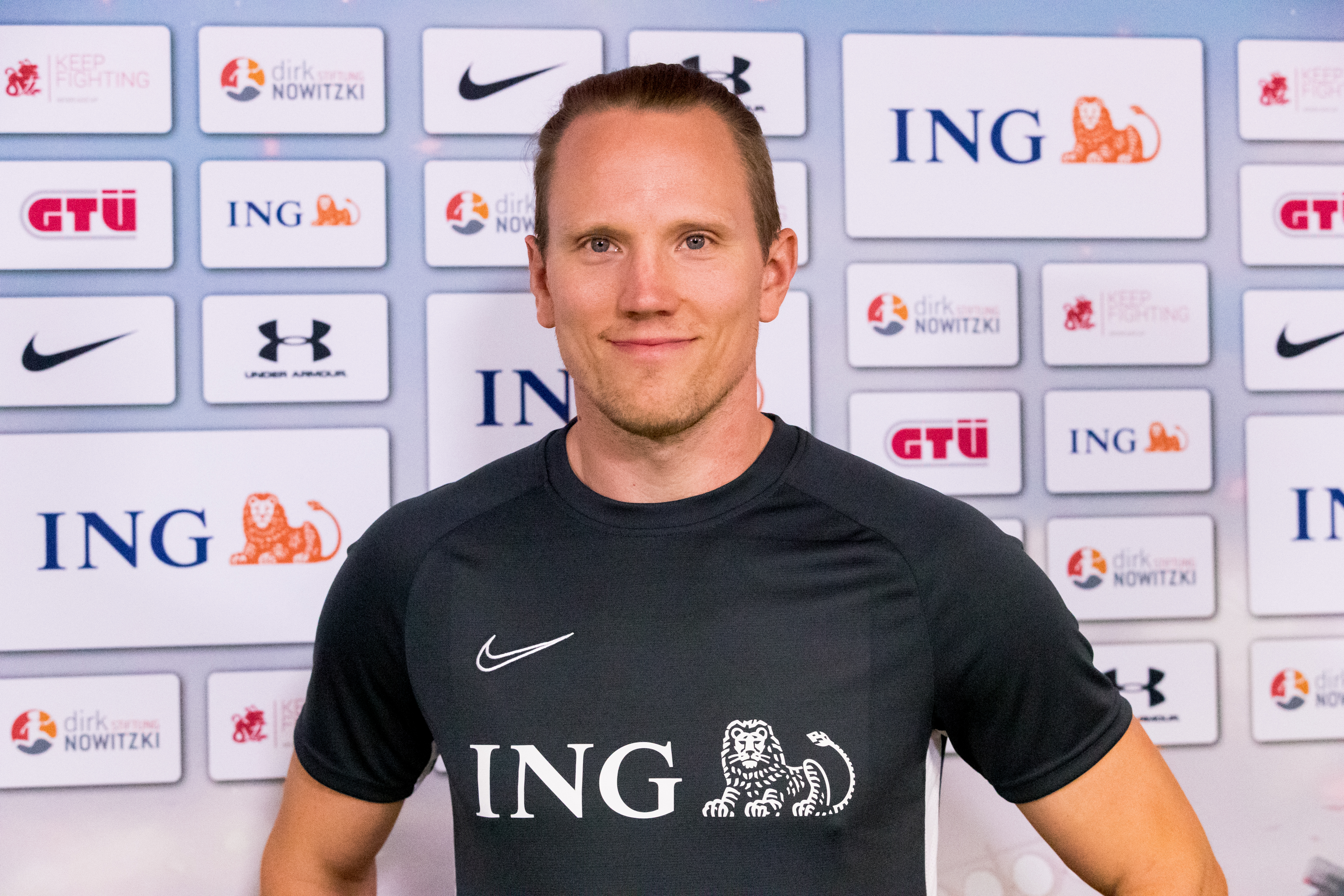
- Ehrhoff in July 2019
- Born: 6 July 1982 (age 44) Moers, West Germany
- Height: 6 ft 2 in (188 cm)
- Weight: 196 lb (89 kg; 14 st 0 lb)
- Position: Defence
- Shot: Left
- Played for: Krefeld Pinguine; San Jose Sharks; Vancouver Canucks; Buffalo Sabres; Pittsburgh Penguins; Los Angeles Kings; Chicago Blackhawks; Kölner Haie
- National team: Germany
- NHL draft: 106th overall, 2001; San Jose Sharks
- Playing career: 1999–2018; 2023–2024

Christian Ehrhoff (born 6 July 1982) is a German former professional ice hockey player. Playing as a defenceman, he played more than 800 games in the National Hockey League (NHL) and more than 300 in the Deutsche Eishockey Liga (DEL). In 2018, he won silver at the Winter Olympics. He is known primarily as an offensive defenceman with strong skating and shooting abilities.

Prior to playing in the NHL, Ehrhoff spent several years playing professionally in Germany, starting with EV Duisburg of the third-tier Oberliga and the Krefeld Pinguine of the premiere Deutsche Eishockey Liga (DEL). He spent three years with Krefeld, winning the German championship in 2003.

Selected 106th overall by the San Jose Sharks in the 2001 NHL entry draft, Ehrhoff moved to North America for the 2003–04 season. He spent one-and-a-half seasons with the Cleveland Barons, the Sharks' American Hockey League (AHL) affiliate, before joining San Jose on a full-time basis beginning in 2005–06. After playing six seasons within the Sharks organization, he was traded to the Vancouver Canucks in August 2009. During his two seasons with the club, he won back-to-back Babe Pratt Trophies as the team's top defenceman and helped them to the 2011 Stanley Cup Final, where they lost to the Boston Bruins. Ehrhoff would go on to play nearly 800 NHL games throughout his career.

Internationally, Ehrhoff has played for the German national team in numerous tournaments, including four Winter Olympics, seven World Championships and a World Cup.

== Early life ==
Ehrhoff was born and raised in Moers, a city on the left bank of the Rhine. His father, Achim, is a drummer in a band, and he has a sister named Katrin. Ehrhoff first played hockey at the age of six, deciding to play the sport after watching an NHL game on television. As his hometown did not have a hockey program, he played minor hockey 20 kilometres away in the Krefeld Pinguine' system. He won a national championship with the club around the age of 12; Ehrhoff has recalled scoring in the final on a penalty shot. Following the NHL growing up, Ehrhoff has singled out Wayne Gretzky, Pavel Bure and Uwe Krupp as his childhood heroes. He was inspired to play in the style of an offensive defenceman after watching a video of Bobby Orr as a 10-year-old.

At the age of 16, he considered moving to North America to further his hockey career in the major junior Canadian Hockey League (CHL), but his father had developed Hodgkin's lymphoma at the time. Ehrhoff consequently decided to stay in Germany and continued in Krefeld's system at the junior level; his father eventually overcame the cancer.

== Playing career ==
=== Germany (1999–2003) ===
After playing in the junior system of the Krefeld Pinguine, Ehrhoff signed a professional contract with the team in 1999, at the age of 17. He debuted in nine games with Krefeld in Germany's premiere Deutsche Eishockey Liga (DEL), while primarily playing with EV Duisburg of the third-tier Oberliga on loan. Over the course of the season, he practiced mornings with Krefeld and evenings with Duisburg. He finished his first professional season with 15 points in 41 games with Duisburg and a goal in nine games for Krefeld. The following season, he joined Krefeld full-time and had 14 points in 58 games for the team in addition to three points in six games with Duisburg. After the conclusion of the season, Ehrhoff was selected 106th overall in the 2001 NHL entry draft by the San Jose Sharks. One of three Germans selected by the Sharks in the draft, Ehrhoff was happy to be taken by the team, as they also had another German, Marco Sturm, on their roster at the time.

Ehrhoff attended the Sharks' subsequent training camp following the draft, but was returned to Germany as an early cut on 11 September 2001. Continuing to play for Krefeld, he notched 24 points in 46 games. Despite impressing with his skating and offensive skills at the Sharks' 2002 training camp, he was returned to Krefeld for the second straight year. After notching a German career-high 27 points in 48 games in 2002–03, Ehrhoff helped Krefeld win a German championship in his final season with the club. He recorded nine points in the postseason.

=== San Jose Sharks (2003–2009) ===
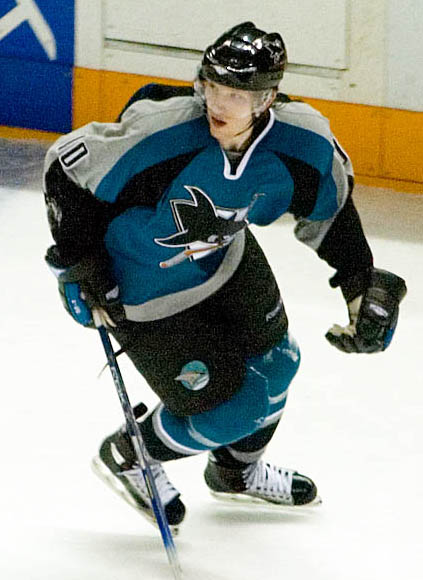
Ehrhoff as a member of the San Jose Sharks in January 2007

With the expectation from Sharks management that Ehrhoff would join their organization either with the NHL club or in the AHL, he was signed to a contract on 22 June 2003. Ehrhoff made his NHL debut on 9 October 2003, against the Edmonton Oilers. He recorded his first point, an assist, on 15 November against the Toronto Maple Leafs. Later that month, he scored his first NHL goal, a game winner against Michael Leighton in a 3–2 win against the Chicago Blackhawks on 26 November. Ehrhoff was selected to play in the 2004 NHL YoungStars Game, along with teammate Jonathan Cheechoo. Aftering helping the Western Conference YoungStars to a 7–3 win over the East, Ehrhoff also did colour commentary during the All-Star Game for a German telecast.

Ehrhoff was often a healthy scratch with the Sharks during his rookie season and spent time with their AHL affiliate, the Cleveland Barons. In 41 games with the Sharks during the 2003–04 season, Ehrhoff recorded 12 points in 41 games, while in the 27 games he played for the Barons, he notched 14 points. He began asserting himself early in his NHL career as an excellent skater with offensive capabilities. Ehrhoff then played a full season with the Barons in 2004–05 due to the NHL lockout, tallying 35 points in 79 games. He was chosen to represent PlanetUSA in the 2005 AHL All-Star Game in Manchester, New Hampshire.

Returning to the Sharks in 2005–06, Ehrhoff recorded a 23-point campaign. He began earning more ice time near the end of the season as he improved his defensive play. On 13 April 2006, he scored the game-winning overtime goal against the Vancouver Canucks for the Sharks to clinch a playoff berth, despite San Jose having previously been eight points out of a playoff spot with a month and a half remaining in the season. Ehrhoff added eight points over 11 postseason games—first among team defencemen—in his first Stanley Cup playoffs as the Sharks were eliminated in the second round by the Edmonton Oilers. He then signed a two-year contract worth US$1.7 million in the off-season.

Ehrhoff responded with a career-high 33 points in 2006–07. He notched a personal-best three assists in one game late in the season in a 3–2 win against the Los Angeles Kings on 27 March 2007. San Jose were once again lost in the second round of the playoffs, being eliminated by the Detroit Red Wings in six games. Ehrhoff had two assists in 11 postseason games. His regular season production decreased to 22 points in the 2007–08 season. On 28 December 2007, Ehrhoff was awarded a penalty shot during a game against the St. Louis Blues; he missed against Manny Legace, though the Sharks nonetheless still won, 1–0. Later in the season, Ehrhoff missed four games due to a lower body injury, suffered on 6 April 2008. After finishing as the second seed in the West, San Jose were defeated in the second round against the Dallas Stars. Ehrhoff notched five assists in ten playoff games.

Ehrhoff became a restricted free agent once more in July 2008 and re-signed with the Sharks to a three-year contract worth $9.3 million. The following season, 2008–09, he reached the 40-point mark for the first time in his career with 42 points in 77 games. He had missed three games in March 2009 due to a lower body injury. Ehrhoff's personal success coincided with a franchise year for the Sharks, who earned their first Presidents' Trophy as regular season champions in team history with 117 points. In the ensuing playoffs, however, they suffered a first-round defeat to the eighth-seeded Anaheim Ducks. Ehrhoff was held pointless in six games.

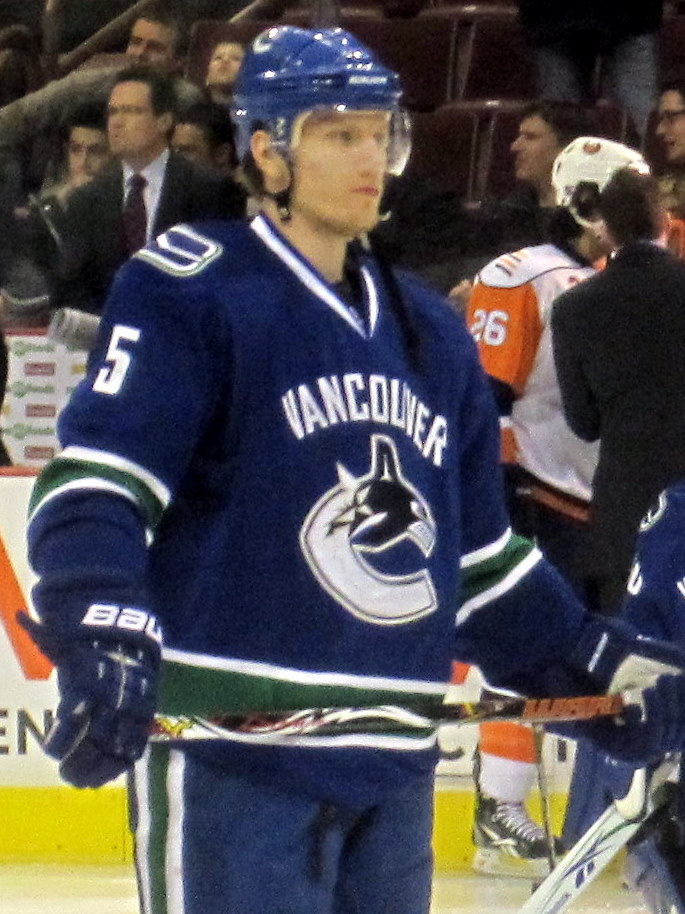
Ehrhoff with the Vancouver Canucks in March 2010

=== Vancouver Canucks (2009–2011) ===
Ehrhoff was traded to the Vancouver Canucks on 28 August 2009, along with defenceman Brad Lukowich, in exchange for prospects Patrick White and Daniel Rahimi. The deal was done primarily to clear salary cap space in anticipation of the Sharks' acquisition of star forward Dany Heatley from the Ottawa Senators. For the Canucks, Ehrhoff's acquisition addressed the need for a puck-moving defenceman to rush the puck up the ice.

Ehrhoff scored his first goal in a Canucks uniform on 5 October 2009, in a 5–3 loss to the Columbus Blue Jackets. The following month, he notched his first two-goal game in the NHL, adding an assist, in a 5–2 win over the Colorado Avalanche on 20 November. Late in the season, he missed two games in April 2010 due to a sprained left knee. Prior to the last game of the regular season against the Calgary Flames, Ehrhoff was awarded the Babe Pratt Trophy as the Canucks' fan-voted best defenceman. He finished his first season in Vancouver leading all team defencemen with career-highs of 14 goals, 44 points, a +36 rating and an average ice time of 22:47 minutes per game. His 44 points tied Uwe Krupp for the most points by a German-born defenceman in an NHL season, while his +36 rating broke the single-season team record shared by Pavel Bure and Marek Malík by one point (Daniel Sedin tied with Ehrhoff for the record in 2009–10, as well). In the subsequent 2010 playoffs, he added seven points in 12 games as Vancouver defeated the Los Angeles Kings in six games in the first round before being eliminated by the eventual Stanley Cup champion Chicago Blackhawks in the second round in six games.

8 December 2010, Ehrhoff was struck in the ear by a puck during a game against the Anaheim Ducks. He left the contest with what was initially considered a concussion; however, he was later diagnosed with vertigo instead and missed the next three games. Recording new career-highs in assists (36) and points (50), he led all Canucks defencemen in scoring, while ranking seventh among League defencemen. Ehrhoff was awarded his second consecutive Babe Pratt Trophy for his regular season efforts. Having won the Presidents' Trophy for the first time in team history, the Canucks entered the 2011 playoffs with the first seed in the West. They eliminated the Chicago Blackhawks, Nashville Predators and San Jose Sharks in the first three rounds to advance to the Stanley Cup Finals for the first time in 17 years. Facing the Boston Bruins, the Canucks lost the series in seven games, unable to hold a 3–2 series lead in the process. While Ehrhoff led Canucks defencemen and ranked second in the League overall with 12 points (two goals and ten assists) over 23 games of 25 games played, he had a team-worst −13 rating. It was revealed following the Canucks' Game 7 defeat to Boston that he had been playing with an injured shoulder suffered in Game three of the previous third round series against his former team, the Sharks as a result of a collision between him and Sharks' forward Jamie McGinn.

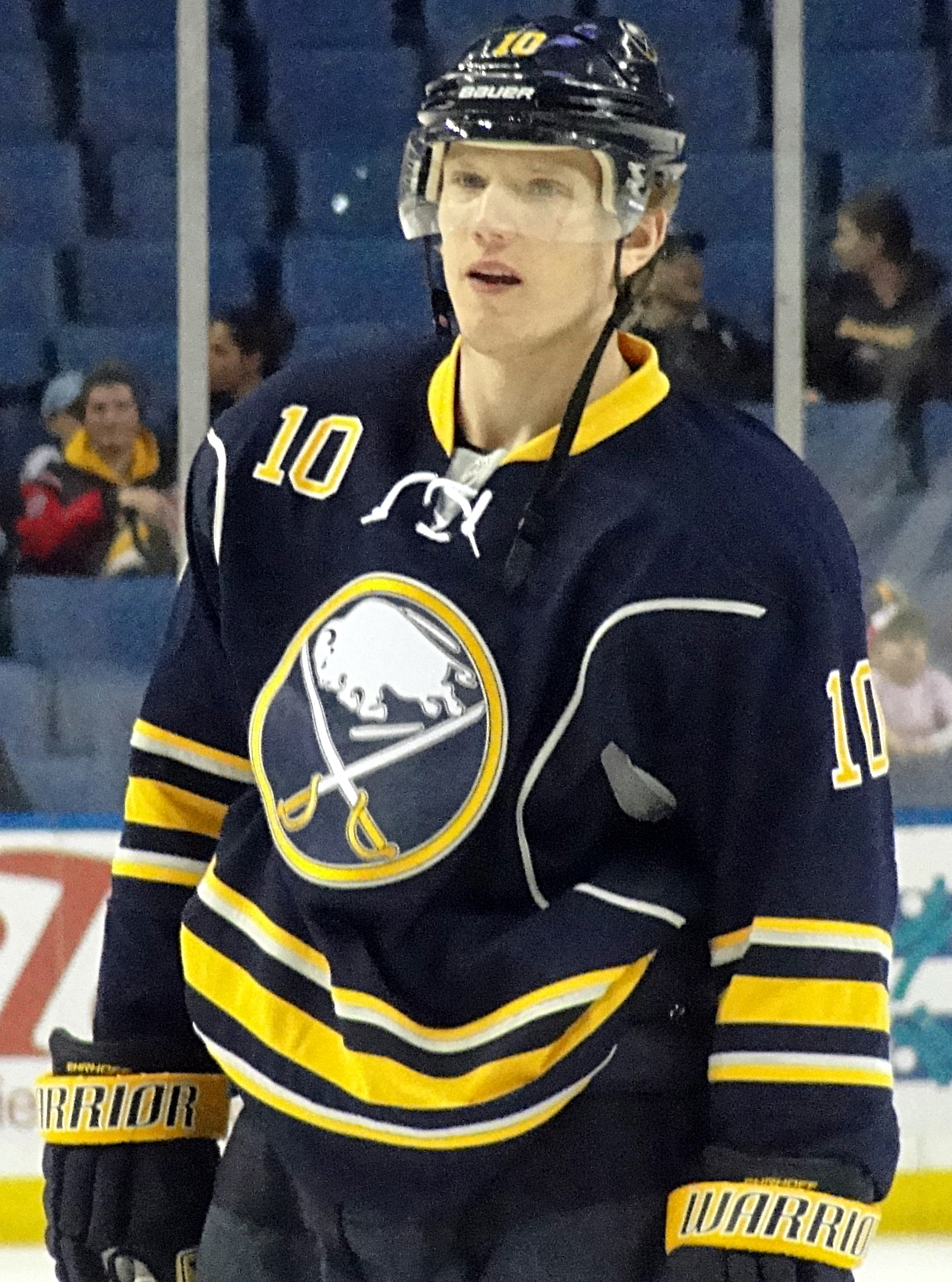
Ehrhoff with the Buffalo Sabres in February 2012.

=== Buffalo Sabres (2011–2014) ===
Set to become an unrestricted free agent on 1 July 2011, Ehrhoff and the Canucks failed to come to terms on a new contract. Three days ahead of his free agency, 28 June 2011, his negotiating rights were traded to the New York Islanders in exchange for a fourth-round pick in the 2012 NHL entry draft. It was reported that Ehrhoff had turned down the same deal that former defensive teammate Kevin Bieksa had signed the previous day—a five-year, $23 million contract—to remain with the Canucks. Although the Islanders had three days of exclusive negotiating rights with Ehrhoff, general manager Garth Snow self-imposed a one-day deadline to sign him. Unable to agree on a contract (Snow commented that the proposed deal was "well north" of the Canucks' offer), Ehrhoff was traded to the Buffalo Sabres on 29 June in exchange for a fourth-round pick in the 2012 NHL entry draft. Two days later, Ehrhoff signed a ten-year, $40 million deal with the Sabres. The contract was worth $18 million in the first two years, then $4 million annually from the third to sixth years, $3 million in the seventh and $1 million in the remaining three. Ehrhoff admitted having a desire for the freedom of unrestricted free agency, but was ultimately won over by the Sabres' contract offer and quality as an organization able to compete for the Stanley Cup. This proved to be a mistake, as the Sabres finished just outside a playoff spot during Ehrhoff's first year with the team (2011–12), missing the playoffs, while the Canucks went on to win a second consecutive President's Trophy that same season.

Ehrhoff made his debut with the Sabres in Helsinki as the NHL opened the 2011–12 season abroad, on 7 October 2011, against the Anaheim Ducks. He recorded an assist on a Thomas Vanek goal in a 4–1 win. Ehrhoff recorded his first goal as a Sabre 11 days later, an empty-netter to secure a 3–1 win over the Montreal Canadiens. He finished the year with five goals and 32 points in 66 games as the Sabres finished ninth in the Eastern Conference, failing to make the 2012 playoffs.

The Sabres began the process of buying-out the remainder of Ehrhoff's contract on 29 June 2014. They will be paying Ehrhoff $12 million over 14 years (around $850,000 per year).

=== Later years ===
On 1 July 2014, it was announced that the Pittsburgh Penguins signed Ehrhoff to a one-year, $4 million deal. Ehrhoff made his debut with the Penguins on 9 October 2014, against Anaheim. An injury shortened season saw Ehrhoff appear in only 49 games, scoring three goals to go with 11 assists.

On 23 August 2015, it was confirmed by General Manager Dean Lombardi that the Los Angeles Kings signed Ehrhoff to a one-year, $1.5 million deal. In the 2015–16 season, Ehrhoff began the season as a regular on the blueline for the Kings. Ehrhoff struggled to perform to past expectations, and after scoring just 2 goals in 40 games was waived by the Kings and assigned to AHL affiliate, the Ontario Reign on 11 February 2016.

After 5 games with the Reign, Ehrhoff's tenure within the Kings organization came to a close when he was traded to the Chicago Blackhawks in exchange for former teammate and Kings defenceman Rob Scuderi on 26 February 2016.

After playing in the World Cup of Hockey, tallying three assists in six contests for Team Europe, Ehrhoff was handed a Professional tryout by the Boston Bruins in late September, but he opted to leave the Bruins the following month.

=== Return to Germany ===
On 24 October 2016, Ehrhoff signed with Kölner Haie of the Deutsche Eishockey Liga (DEL) in his native Germany. After two seasons with the Sharks, he announced his retirement from professional hockey in March 2018. On 26 April 2023, Ehrhoff came out of retirement and signed a one-year contract with his former team, Krefeld Pinguine, of the German DEL2.

== International play ==
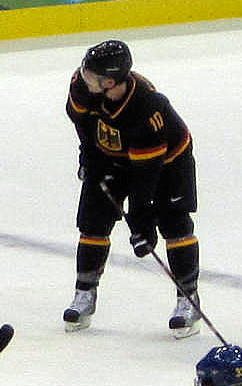
- Ehrhoff at the 2010 Olympics

Medal record

Men's ice hockey

Representing Germany

Ice hockey

Olympic Games
Silver medal – second place	2018 Pyeongchang	

As a junior, Ehrhoff competed for Germany's under-18 team at the inaugural 1999 IIHF World U18 Championships, hosted in Füssen and Kaufbeuren, Germany. He returned the following year for the 2000 IIHF World U18 Championships in Switzerland, where Germany finished in seventh place. Ehrhoff then debuted at the under-20 level in Division I (Note: Division I is the highest competitive level for countries that do not qualify for the main tournament.) of the 2001 World Junior Championships. Hosting the tournament in the cities of Füssen and Landsberg, Germany missed a promotion to the main tournament the following year by finishing in second place behind France. Ehrhoff made his second appearance at the Division I level for the 2002 World Junior Championships in Austria, leading all tournament defencemen with three goals and 10 points in five games. He helped Germany earn a promotion to the main tournament for the following year, defeating Austria 7–1 in the gold medal game. In both years competing in the tournament, Ehrhoff earned Top Defenceman honours.

Two months after his final international junior appearance, Ehrhoff debuted with Germany's senior team for the 2002 Winter Olympics in Salt Lake City. He played in seven games as the second youngest player in the tournament. Germany was eliminated by the United States in the quarterfinal with a 5–0 shutout loss. Later that year, he competed in the 2002 World Championships, scoring five points in seven games. Germany was defeated in the quarterfinal by Sweden 6–2. Ehrhoff made his second World Championships appearance in 2003, but failed to register a point as Germany were once again losers in the quarterfinal round. After his rookie season in the NHL, Ehrhoff competed for Germany in the 2004 World Cup. They lost 2–1 to Finland in the quarterfinal. The following year, he registered an assist in six games at the 2005 World Championships. Germany finished second-to-last in the tournament. After failing to qualify for the quarterfinal, they won one of three games in the relegation round.

On 21 December 2005, Ehrhoff was named to the German Olympic team, along with Sharks teammate Marcel Goc, for the 2006 Winter Games in Turin. His lone goal of the tournament came against Canada, a 5–1 loss. He added an assist in the tournament for two points in five games as Germany failed to win a preliminary game, missing out on the playoff rounds. Four years later, he was named to Germany's Olympic team for the 2010 Winter Games in his NHL hometown of Vancouver. He went pointless in four games, while leading his team in ice time. Germany was eliminated by Canada in an 8–2 qualifier for the quarterfinal.

Shortly after the Vancouver Canucks were eliminated from the 2010 Stanley Cup playoffs several months later, Ehrhoff joined Germany for the 2010 World Championships. Germany played as tournament host in the cities of Cologne and Mannheim. Joining his team midway through the tournament, he missed the first three games before scoring a goal and an assist in six contests. Germany made it to the semifinal, where they were defeated by Russia 2–1. Ehrhoff assisted on Germany's lone goal and was named his team's player of the game. They went on to lose the bronze medal game 3–1 to Sweden. Their fourth-place finish marked their best placing at the World Championships since 1953 when they won silver. Leading Germany in average ice time with 23:34 minutes per game, Ehrhoff was named to the Tournament All-Star Team, along with German goaltender Dennis Endras.

Ehrhoff was part of Germany's team for the 2018 Winter Olympics, winning a sensational silver medal at event. He carried the flag of his country at the closing ceremony. In the course of his career, he received a total of 118 caps for the German men's national team.

== Playing style ==
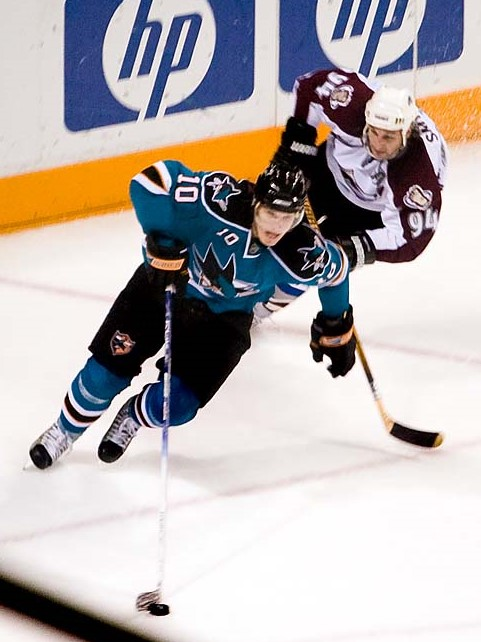
Ehrhoff carrying the puck up ice from his own zone with Ryan Smyth in pursuit in November 2007.

Ehrhoff is known as an offensive defenceman. He has strong skating ability, which allows him to quickly carry the puck up the ice, starting plays from his team's defensive zone, as well as join offensive plays deep in the opposing team's zone. He also possesses a hard shot, which earns him significant time on the power play. Upon joining the NHL with San Jose, he had to adjust his game to be more defensive. He gradually became counted upon more in defensive situations and has been used on the penalty kill, as well.

== Personal life ==
Ehrhoff and his wife, Farina, have three daughters. All three girls were born in different North American cities as a result of his career. During his time with the Canucks, they lived in the Vancouver neighbourhood of Yaletown. During the off-seasons, they would return to Germany, where they have a condo in Krefeld.

== Career statistics ==
=== Regular season and playoffs ===
			Regular season					Playoffs
Season	Team	League	GP	G	A	Pts	PIM	GP	G	A	Pts	PIM
1998–99	Krefeld Pinguine	GER U20	22	10	14	24	46	—	—	—	—	—
1999–00	EV Duisburg	Oberliga	41	3	12	15	50	—	—	—	—	—
1999–00	Krefeld Pinguine	DEL	9	1	0	1	0	3	0	0	0	0
2000–01	EV Duisburg	Oberliga	6	1	2	3	12	—	—	—	—	—
2000–01	Krefeld Pinguine	DEL	58	3	11	14	73	—	—	—	—	—
2001–02	Krefeld Pinguine	DEL	46	7	17	24	81	3	0	0	0	2
2002–03	Krefeld Pinguine	DEL	48	10	17	27	54	14	3	6	9	24
2003–04	San Jose Sharks	NHL	41	1	11	12	14	—	—	—	—	—
2003–04	Cleveland Barons	AHL	27	4	10	14	43	9	2	6	8	11
2004–05	Cleveland Barons	AHL	79	12	23	35	103	—	—	—	—	—
2005–06	San Jose Sharks	NHL	64	5	18	23	32	11	2	6	8	18
2006–07	San Jose Sharks	NHL	82	10	23	33	63	11	0	2	2	6
2007–08	San Jose Sharks	NHL	77	1	21	22	72	10	0	5	5	14
2008–09	San Jose Sharks	NHL	77	8	34	42	63	6	0	0	0	2
2009–10	Vancouver Canucks	NHL	80	14	30	44	42	12	3	4	7	8
2010–11	Vancouver Canucks	NHL	79	14	36	50	52	23	2	10	12	16
2011–12	Buffalo Sabres	NHL	66	5	27	32	47	—	—	—	—	—
2012–13	Krefeld Pinguine	DEL	32	8	18	26	52	—	—	—	—	—
2012–13	Buffalo Sabres	NHL	47	5	17	22	34	—	—	—	—	—
2013–14	Buffalo Sabres	NHL	79	6	27	33	38	—	—	—	—	—
2014–15	Pittsburgh Penguins	NHL	49	3	11	14	26	—	—	—	—	—
2015–16	Los Angeles Kings	NHL	40	2	8	10	32	—	—	—	—	—
2015–16	Ontario Reign	AHL	5	0	3	3	8	—	—	—	—	—
2015–16	Chicago Blackhawks	NHL	8	0	2	2	2	—	—	—	—	—
2016–17	Kölner Haie	DEL	36	8	15	23	20	7	1	0	1	10
2017–18	Kölner Haie	DEL	52	8	23	31	28	6	0	6	6	2
DEL totals			281	45	101	146	314	33	4	12	16	38
NHL totals			789	74	265	339	517	73	7	27	34	64

=== International ===
Year	Team	Event	Result	GP	G	A	Pts	PIM
1999	Germany	WJC18	9th	6	1	2	3	6
2000	Germany	WJC18	7th	6	0	1	1	20
2001	Germany	WJC D1	12th	5	1	3	4	6
2002	Germany	WJC D1	11th	5	3	7	10	10
2002	Germany	OG	8th	7	0	0	0	8
2002	Germany	WC	8th	7	2	3	5	4
2003	Germany	WC	6th	7	0	0	0	8
2004	Germany	WCH	8th	4	0	0	0	2
2005	Germany	WC	15th	6	0	1	1	4
2006	Germany	OG	10th	5	1	1	2	4
2010	Germany	OG	11th	4	0	0	0	4
2010	Germany	WC	4th	6	1	1	2	0
2013	Germany	WC	9th	7	3	2	5	10
2016	Germany	WC	7th	8	1	0	1	6
2016	Germany	OGQ	Q	3	0	0	0	0
2016	Team Europe	WCH	2nd	6	0	3	3	6
2017	Germany	WC	8th	6	1	4	5	4
2018	Germany	OG	2nd place, silver medalist(s)	7	1	1	2	10
Junior totals				22	5	13	18	42
Senior totals				83	10	16	26	70

== Awards ==
Award	Year
World Junior Division I – Top Defenceman	2001, 2002
Deutsche Eishockey Liga champion	2003
Babe Pratt Trophy	2010, 2011
World Championship All-Star team	2010

== Records ==
- Vancouver Canucks record; highest plus-minus rating, single-season: +36 in 2009–10 (surpassed Pavel Bure and Marek Malík; tied with Daniel Sedin)
