= Dennis Kearns =

Canadian ice hockey player

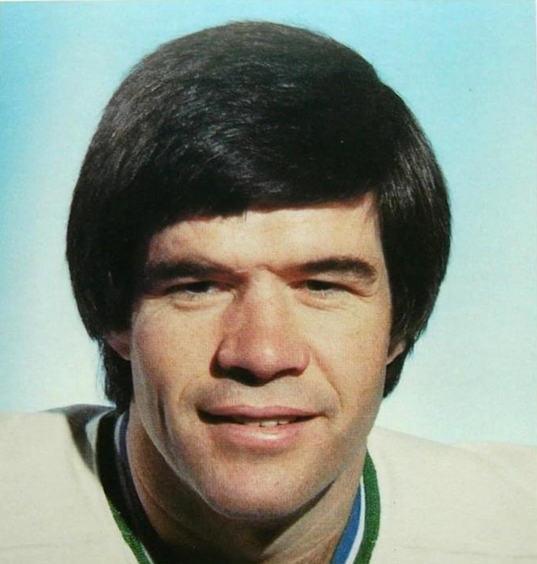
- Born: September 27, 1945 (age 81) Kingston, Ontario, Canada
- Height: 5 ft 8 in (173 cm)
- Weight: 182 lb (83 kg; 13 st 0 lb)
- Position: Defence
- Shot: Left
- Played for: Vancouver Canucks
- National team: Canada
- Playing career: 1967–1981
Medal record
Representing Canada
Ice hockey
World Championships
Bronze medal – third place	1978 Prague

Dennis McAleer Kearns (born September 27, 1945) is a Canadian former professional ice hockey defenceman who spent his entire National Hockey League (NHL) career with the Vancouver Canucks. He is the cousin of Shawn Evans.

== Playing career ==
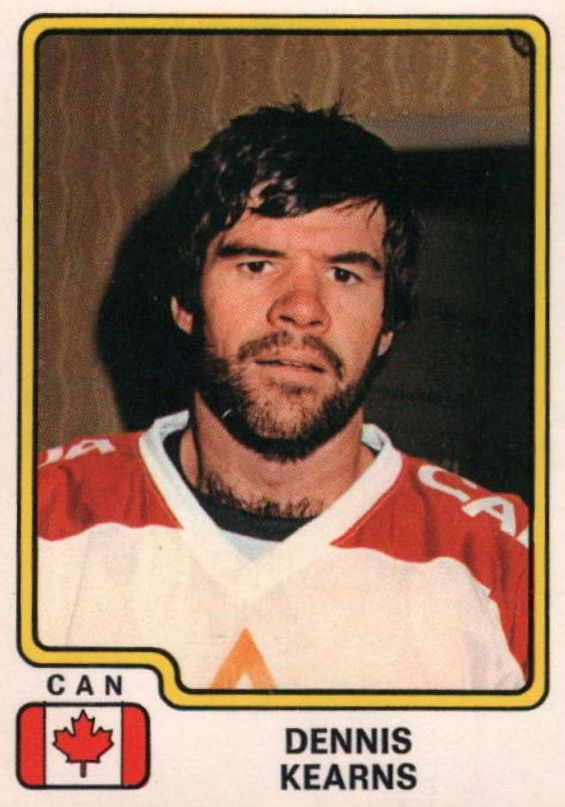
Kearns in 1979 card

His rights being held by the Chicago Black Hawks, Kearns served a four-year apprentice in the minor leagues, principally with the Portland Buckaroos of the Western Hockey League. Between the 1969 and 1971 seasons, Kearns was a First or Second Team league All-Star all three years.

In the summer of 1971, Chicago – then being deep on defence, behind perennial All-Stars Pat Stapleton and Bill White – exposed Kearns in the Intra-League Draft, and he was claimed by Vancouver, for whom he made his NHL debut that fall. Kearns played his next ten years in Vancouver, his entire NHL career, becoming a star playmaker with noteworthy skill on offense and the power play despite his small size for a defenceman. His best years were between 1976 and 1978, when, having recovered from injuries the previous two years, he averaged nearly fifty assists a season, was named to the Canadian national team at the World Championships twice, and was called by The Hockey News the "Denis Potvin of the West." His feats on the ice never translated to success in the playoffs; during his career Kearns played in only eleven playoff games, and the Canucks won only three playoff matches during his tenure.

His production declined sharply after the 1979 season, and no longer a frontline defenceman as the team moved younger players into prominence, retired after the 1981 season.

== International career ==
Kearns was a member of Team Canada at the 1977 and 1978 World Ice Hockey Championships.

== Retirement ==
Kearns finished his career with 31 goals and 290 assists for 321 points in 677 games, adding 386 penalty minutes. His 55 assists in 1977 remained the franchise record for defencemen until surpassed by Quinn Hughes in 2022 with 60 assists. His 321 career points was the all-time mark for Canucks defencemen for over three decades until surpassed by Mattias Öhlund at the end of the 2009 season. His 290 career assists stood as the franchise record for defenceman until being overtaken by Alexander Edler in 2020.

In retirement, he and his family live in Vancouver, where he owns an insurance business. His son, Bracken Kearns, also played hockey professionally with the Florida Panthers, San Jose Sharks, and New York Islanders before retiring in 2019.

== Career statistics ==
=== Regular season and playoffs ===
			Regular season					Playoffs
Season	Team	League	GP	G	A	Pts	PIM	GP	G	A	Pts	PIM
1965–66	Kingston Frontenacs	EJHL
1966–67	Kingston Aces	OHA-Sr.	40	17	14	31	47	—	—	—	—	—
1967–68	Portland Buckaroos	WHL	68	5	15	20	62	12	2	4	6	2
1968–69	Portland Buckaroos	WHL	74	2	42	44	81	11	2	6	8	13
1969–70	Portland Buckaroos	WHL	72	11	42	53	67	8	1	6	7	9
1970–71	Dallas Black Hawks	CHL	65	8	44	52	65	10	2	5	7	14
1971–72	Vancouver Canucks	NHL	73	3	26	29	59	—	—	—	—	—
1972–73	Vancouver Canucks	NHL	72	4	33	37	51	—	—	—	—	—
1973–74	Vancouver Canucks	NHL	52	4	13	17	30	—	—	—	—	—
1974–75	Vancouver Canucks	NHL	49	1	11	12	31	4	0	0	0	4
1975–76	Vancouver Canucks	NHL	80	5	46	51	48	2	0	1	1	0
1976–77	Vancouver Canucks	NHL	80	5	55	60	60	—	—	—	—	—
1977–78	Vancouver Canucks	NHL	80	4	43	47	27	—	—	—	—	—
1978–79	Vancouver Canucks	NHL	78	3	31	34	28	3	1	1	2	2
1979–80	Vancouver Canucks	NHL	67	1	18	19	24	2	0	0	0	2
1980–81	Vancouver Canucks	NHL	46	1	14	15	28	—	—	—	—	—
NHL totals			677	31	290	321	386	11	1	2	3	8

=== International ===
Year	Team	Event	GP	G	A	Pts	PIM
1977	Canada	WC	10	0	1	1	2
1978	Canada	WC	10	0	1	1	14
Senior totals			20	0	2	2	16
