= History of the Vancouver Canucks =

History of hockey team Vancouver Canucks

The history of the Vancouver Canucks begins when the team joined the National Hockey League (NHL). Founded as an expansion team in 1970 along with the Buffalo Sabres, the Vancouver Canucks were the first NHL team to be based in Vancouver. They adopted the name of the minor professional hockey team that had existed in Vancouver since 1945.

After initially struggling as an expansion team in the NHL, the Canucks won their first division title in 1975. Vancouver then proceed to set a record for futility in North American professional sports by enduring 16 consecutive losing seasons, although it was in the midst of this streak when the team, led by captain Stan Smyl, made their first Stanley Cup Final in 1982, losing in four straight games to the New York Islanders. After acquiring several key players, including Trevor Linden, Pavel Bure and Kirk McLean, they won consecutive division titles in 1992 and 1993. The Canucks made a second appearance in the Stanley Cup Final in 1994, losing in the seventh and deciding game to the New York Rangers. Returning to several years of slightly less decent play, in the late 1990s, the team improved under the leadership of captain Markus Naslund in the early part of the 21st century.

== Background ==
Vancouver became home to a professional ice hockey team for the first time in 1911 when Patrick brothers Frank and Lester established the Vancouver Millionaires, one of three teams in the new Pacific Coast Hockey Association. To accommodate the Millionaires, the Patrick brothers directed the building of the Denman Arena, which was known at the time as the world's largest artificial ice rink (it burned down in 1936). The Millionaires played for the Stanley Cup five times, winning over the Ottawa Senators in 1915 on home ice. It marked the first time the Stanley Cup was won by a west coast team in the trophy's history.

After the Millionaires disbanded following the 1925–26 season, Vancouver was home to only minor league teams for many years. Most notably, the present-day Canucks' minor league predecessor (also known as the Vancouver Canucks), played from 1945 to 1970 in the Pacific Coast Hockey League and Western Hockey League.

=== 1967–1970: NHL application ===
With the intention of attracting an NHL franchise, Vancouver began the construction of a new modern arena, the Pacific Coliseum, in 1967. The WHL's Canucks were playing in a small indoor arena at the time, the Vancouver Forum, situated on the same Pacific National Exhibition grounds as the Coliseum. Meanwhile, a Vancouver group led by WHL Canucks owner and former Vancouver mayor Fred Hume made a bid to be one of the six teams due to join the league in 1967, but the NHL rejected their application. Bid leader Cyril McLean called the denial a "cooked-up deal", referring to several biases that factored against them. Speculation long abounded afterwards that the bid was hindered by Toronto Maple Leafs president Stafford Smythe; after a failed Vancouver-based business deal, he was quoted as saying that the city would not get an NHL franchise in his lifetime. Additionally, along with the Montreal Canadiens, Smythe purportedly did not wish to split Canadian Broadcasting Corporation (CBC) hockey revenues three ways rather than two. There were reports at the time, however, that the group had made a very weak proposal in expectation that Vancouver was a lock for one of the new franchises.

Less than a year later, the Oakland Seals were in financial difficulty and having trouble drawing fans. An apparent deal was in place to move the team to Vancouver, but the NHL did not want to see one of their franchises from the expansion of 1967 move so quickly and nixed the deal. In exchange for avoiding a lawsuit, the NHL promised Vancouver would get a team in the next expansion. Another group, headed by Minnesota entrepreneur Tom Scallen, made a new presentation, and was awarded an expansion franchise for the price of $6 million (three times the cost in 1967). The new ownership group purchased the WHL Canucks, and joined the league along with the Buffalo Sabres for the 1970–71 season.

== Team history ==
=== 1970–1982: Early years ===
To fill the Canucks' roster for their inaugural season, the NHL held an expansion draft in the preceding summer. A draft lottery was held on June 9, 1970, determining who between the Canucks and Sabres would receive the first selection in the Expansion Draft, as well as the 1970 NHL amateur draft; the Sabres won both spins. With his first selection in the Expansion Draft, Canucks general manager Bud Poile chose defenceman Gary Doak. Among the other players chosen by Vancouver were centre Orland Kurtenbach, who was named the Canucks' first-ever captain; as well as defenceman Pat Quinn, who later became the team's general manager and coach in the 1990s. Two days later, on June 11, 1970, the Canucks made defenceman Dale Tallon their first-ever amateur draft selection. Tallon played three seasons with the club before being traded away to the Chicago Black Hawks. By comparison, the Sabres chose centre Gilbert Perreault with the first overall selection they won from the lottery; Perrault went on to become a nine-time All-Star and member of the Hockey Hall of Fame.

At this time, the NHL was divided into East and West Divisions, however the actual makeup of divisions was not strictly determined by geography. Instead, the East consisted of the Original Six teams while the West comprised the teams that had joined in 1967. One of the conditions of the 1970 expansion was that the new teams would join the established East while the westernmost of the Original Six teams (the Chicago Black Hawks) would move to the West. As a result, despite playing on the West Coast, Vancouver made its NHL debut in the East Division. While this arrangement provided the Canucks the benefit of more lucrative dates against the other five Original Six teams (including their Canadian rivals in Montreal and Toronto) it also all but assured the team would finish well out of playoff contention for its initial seasons, since at the time playoff qualification was limited to the top four teams per division.

With the Canucks' roster set, the team played its inaugural game against the Los Angeles Kings on October 9, 1970. They lost the contest 3–1; defenceman Barry Wilkins scored the Canucks' lone goal in the game and first in franchise history, a backhander against goaltender Denis DeJordy. Two days later, the squad recorded the first win in franchise history, a 5–3 victory over the Toronto Maple Leafs.

Not surprisingly given the tough divisional alignment, the Canucks struggled in their early years, failing to make the playoffs in their first four seasons. In an effort to compete in the East, Poile assembled a core of players during this period led by Kurtenbach that included defencemen Tallon and Jocelyn Guevremont, as well as wingers Andre Boudrias and Dennis Ververgaert. Boudrias emerged as the team's leading point-scorer in four of their first five seasons.

Prior to the 1974–75 season, Scallen and his ownership group from Minnesota sold the team to local media mogul Frank Griffiths for $9 million. Also in the summer of 1974, the NHL continued to aggressively expand in the face of competition from the rival World Hockey Association. The previous season, the upstart WHA placed a team in Vancouver, the Vancouver Blazers. The Canucks aggressively lobbied for a new divisional alignment, arguing they needed to be competitive on the ice to successfully compete with the Blazers at the box office. Because of this and other considerations, the East Division was dissolved and the Canucks were re-aligned into the new Smythe Division, which was a much weaker division.

The Canucks responded with their first winning record (38 wins, 32 losses and 10 ties) and their first division title with 86 points. This not only gave them their first-ever postseason berth but a bye to the quarterfinal round of the expanded Stanley Cup playoffs, however the Canucks lost in five games to the Montreal Canadiens. Head coach and general manager Phil Maloney (the third GM in team history after Poile and Hal Laycoe) recalled the importance of a successful season for the Canucks in that year specifically, as they were in direct competition with the Blazers. The Canucks easily outdrew the Blazers and the latter team relocated to Calgary the following season. The Canucks posted a second consecutive winning record and made the playoffs in 1975–76, but were edged out by the Chicago Black Hawks for the division title and swept by the New York Islanders in a best-of-three preliminary series.

The Canucks missed the playoffs in the two seasons thereafter. Meanwhile, Kurtenbach had since retired and assumed a coaching position with Vancouver. His departure as a player marked the beginning of a seven-year period in which the Canucks had four different captains – Boudrias, Chris Oddleifson, Don Lever and Kevin McCarthy. Following their post-season loss to the Islanders in 1976, Vancouver did not have another winning season for 16 years, nevertheless due to the expanded playoff format the Canucks still made the playoffs nine times in that span. Following the 1976–77 season, Maloney was replaced as general manager by Jake Milford, who acquired such players as Stan Smyl, Thomas Gradin and Richard Brodeur, a core that would lead the team throughout the 1980s.

==== 1982 Stanley Cup run ====
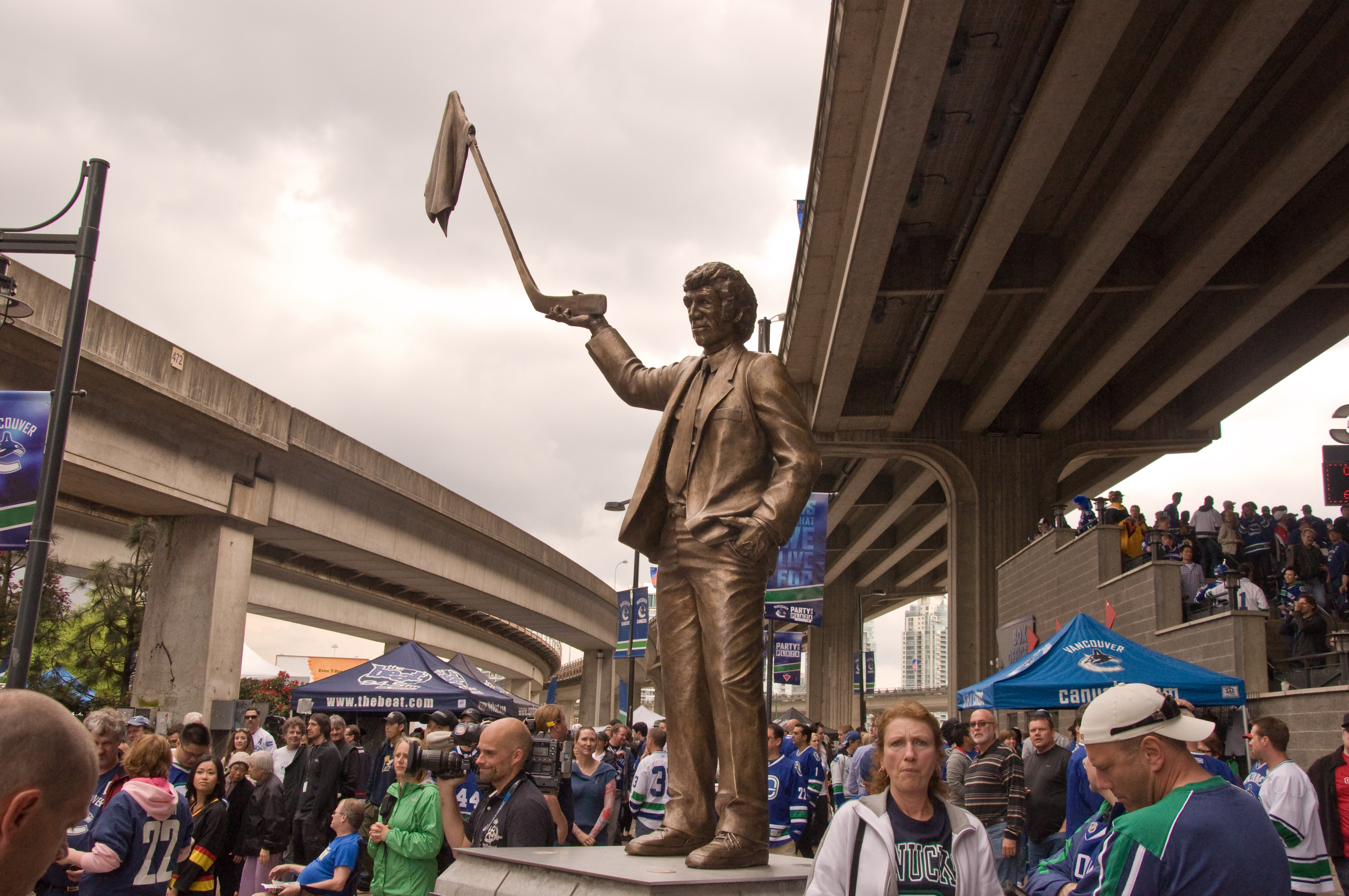
A statue of coach Roger Neilson outside of Rogers Arena, commemorating the 1982 Stanley Cup run.

The Canucks made their first significant playoff impact in the post-season of 1982. In their previous five playoff appearances, the team had failed to win a single series. Though the Canucks finished three games under a .500 win percentage in the 1981–82 regular season, they began gaining momentum by finishing the campaign on a nine-game unbeaten streak. Meanwhile, Smyl emerged as the club's leader, replacing McCarthy as captain after the latter was sidelined with an injury late in the season (he would retain that position for a team-record eight years). Continuing their success in the playoffs, the Canucks made the Stanley Cup Final with a combined 11–2 record in series against the Calgary Flames, Los Angeles Kings and Chicago Black Hawks. Despite having a losing regular season record, Vancouver had home ice advantage in the first series, having finished second in the Smythe Division to the Edmonton Oilers. The Canucks also had home ice advantage during the second round series against the Kings, who upset the Oilers in the first round.

During the Conference Finals against the Black Hawks, Vancouver interim head coach Roger Neilson, frustrated with what he felt was the poor officiating in the game, placed a white towel on the end of a hockey stick and held it up in a gesture mocking surrender (waving the white flag). The players on the Canucks' bench followed suit. At the next game, the team's fans cheered their team on by waving white towels above their heads. The habit stuck, becoming an original Canuck fan tradition now seen across the NHL and in other sports, known as "Towel Power". The Canucks proceeded to win the series, reaching the Stanley Cup Final for the first time in their history.

Entering the Finals against the New York Islanders, the Canucks were the first team from Western Canada to play for the Stanley Cup in 56 years, when the Victoria Cougars reached the 1926 Stanley Cup Final. It also marked the first ever coast-to-coast Stanley Cup Final. Competing against the Islanders – the Stanley Cup champions of the previous two years who had finished with 41 points more than Vancouver in the regular season standings – Vancouver took the first game to overtime. In the final minute of the extra period, Canucks defenceman and fan favourite Harold Snepsts gave the puck away with an errant pass from behind his net, leading to a Mike Bossy goal. The Canucks were unable to complete their Cinderella run and were swept, losing their next three games by 6–4, 3–0 and 3–1 scores. The 1982 playoffs proved to be the last year in which Vancouver won a playoff series until 1992.

=== 1982–1994: Decline and resurgence ===
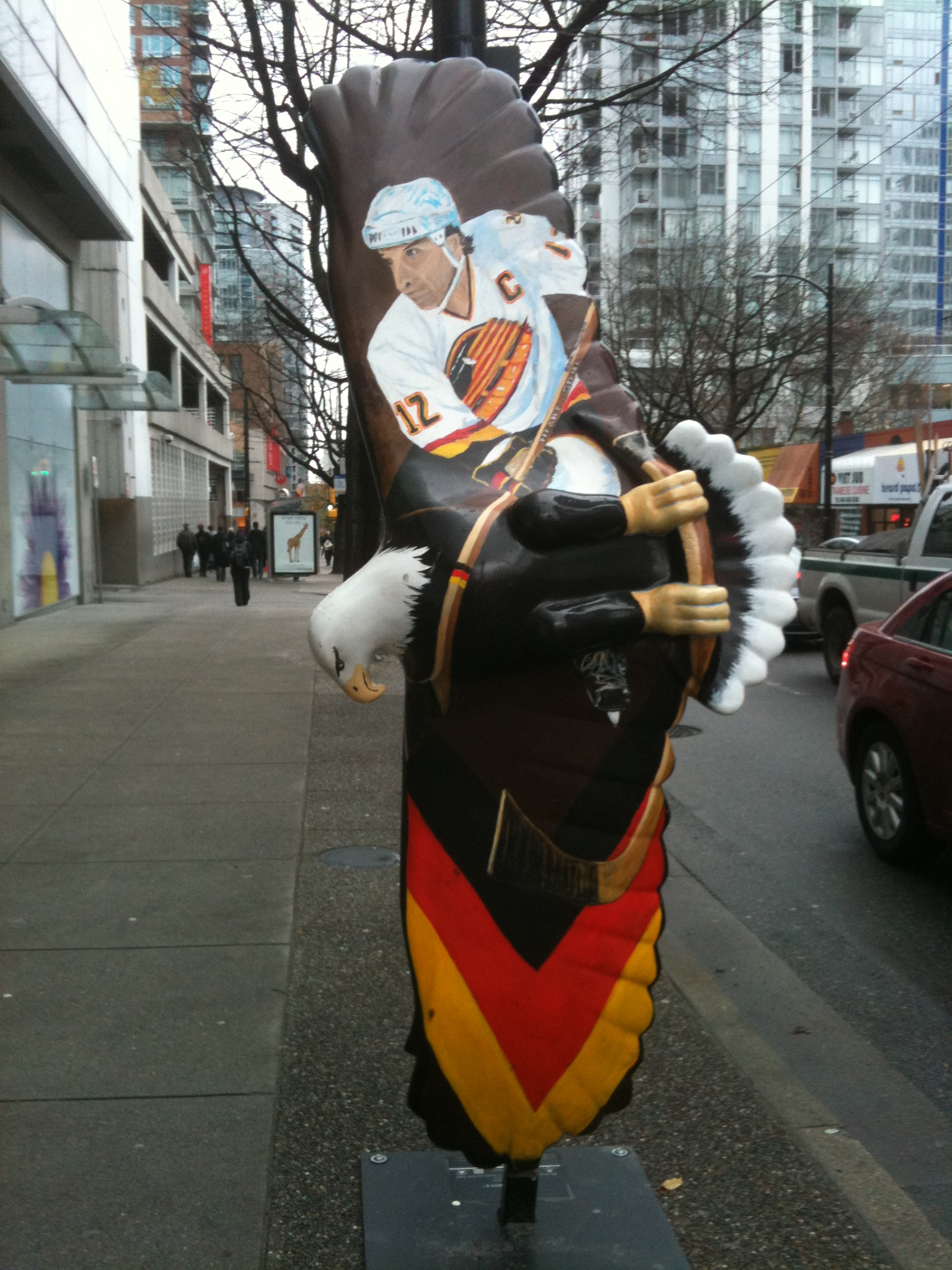
Sculpture featuring Stan Smyl, who was the Canucks captain from 1982 to 1990.

After their improbable Stanley Cup run, the Canucks slipped back into mediocrity for the rest of the 1980s. At the time, the NHL had one of the easiest playoff qualification formats in the history of professional sports, with four of five teams from the Smythe making the playoffs, nevertheless, the Canucks qualified only four times for the rest of the decade. Notable players that joined the Canucks' core following the 1982 playoffs included offensively-skilled forwards Patrik Sundstrom and Tony Tanti. Beginning in 1983–84, the Canucks' scoring title was held by either Sundstrom or Tanti for four of the next five seasons. For most of the second half of the 1980s, the Canucks competed with the Los Angeles Kings for the final playoff spot in the Smythe Division. The years in which they qualified, the team was eliminated by the Edmonton Oilers (in 1985–86) or the Calgary Flames (in 1982–83, 1983–84 and 1989), both division rivals.

Following Milford's tenure as general manager from 1977 to 1982, the position was held by Harry Neale for three years, then Jack Gordon for two. The latter was responsible for trading away power forward Cam Neely to the Boston Bruins in 1986. Neely went on to have a Hall of Fame career with the Bruins, recording three 50-goal seasons. In return, the Canucks acquired centre Barry Pederson. While Pederson collected back-to-back 70-point seasons with the Canucks in his first two seasons after the trade, he was traded to the Pittsburgh Penguins in 1989, as his performance quickly declined.

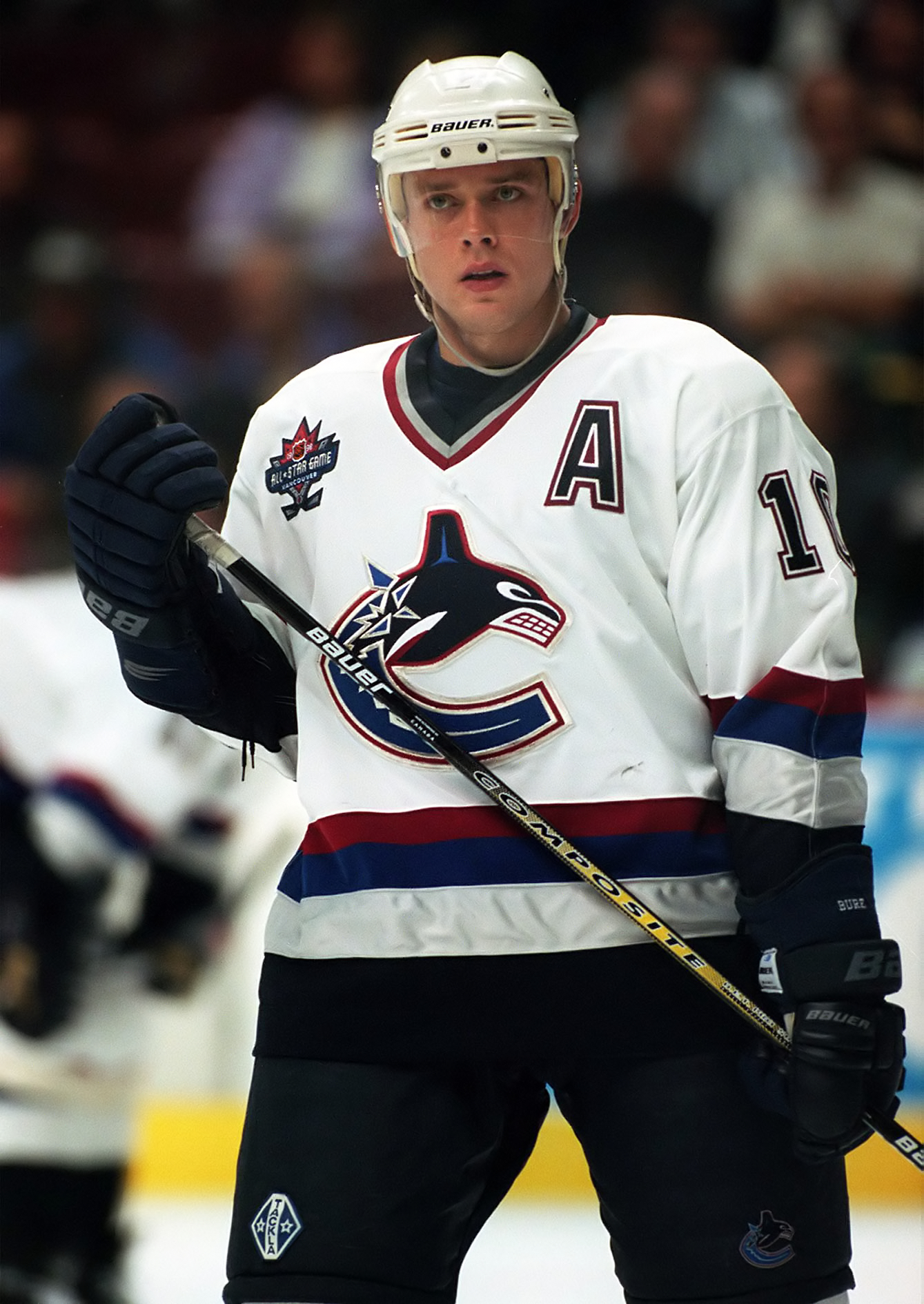
Pavel Bure was drafted by the Canucks in the 1989 NHL entry draft.

After the installation of former Canucks defenceman Pat Quinn as general manager in the summer of 1987, the team underwent an immediate rebuilding process, trading away core veterans for younger prospects and players. Among the more key transactions was a deal with the New Jersey Devils, in which Sundstrom was traded away in exchange for winger Greg Adams and goaltender Kirk McLean. In addition to Quinn's trades, the team improved through the draft route with two selections, in particular. With the second overall selection in the 1988 NHL entry draft, the Canucks chose winger Trevor Linden from the Western Hockey League (WHL). The following year, the team made a controversial selection by choosing Russian winger Pavel Bure 113th overall; Bure was believed by most teams to be ineligible for selection that year. Consequently, his draft by the Canucks took a year to be verified by the NHL as team management went about procuring documents to prove his eligibility.

As the decade turned, a shift in the Canucks' leadership occurred as Stan Smyl resigned his captaincy prior to the 1990–91 season due to a reduced on-ice role with the team. In his place, the Canucks implemented a rotating captaincy of Linden, Dan Quinn and Doug Lidster; of the three Linden retained the captaincy thereafter, becoming the youngest permanent captain in team history at age 21. At the end of the season, Smyl retired as the team's all-time leader in games played, goals, assists and points. Led by Linden and in large part to Quinn's dealings, the Canucks rose to prominence in the early 1990s. This increased success came roughly around the time the Oilers and Flames began to sink in the standings. As a result, Vancouver won their first division title in 17 years with 42 wins, 26 losses and 12 ties during the 1991–92 season. During the campaign, the Canucks honoured Smyl, who had remained the team as an assistant coach, by making him the first player in team history to have his jersey (number 12) retired. In the 1992 playoffs, the Canucks won their first series since 1982 before being eliminated by the Oilers in the second round. Quinn and Bure became the first Canucks recipients of major NHL awards in the off-season, being awarded the Jack Adams Award as the best coach (Quinn assumed a dual coaching and general managerial role starting that year) and the top rookie in the league, respectively. The following year, the Canucks repeated as regular season division champions, while Bure emerged as arguably the team's first superstar with his first of back-to-back 60-goal seasons, totals which remain the highest recorded in Canucks history.

==== 1994 Stanley Cup run ====
In 1994, the Canucks made their second trip to the Stanley Cup Finals, entering the playoffs as the seventh seed in the renamed Western Conference. Despite underachieving in the regular season (their points total decreased by 16 from the previous year), the Canucks played well in the playoffs and embarked on another unexpected run.

Opening the playoffs with a close first-round series against the Calgary Flames, Vancouver rallied from a three-games-to-one deficit to win the series in seven contests. Games 5 through 7 were all won in overtime with goals from Geoff Courtnall, Trevor Linden and Pavel Bure. The deciding seventh game featured two of the most recognizable and celebrated plays in Canucks history. With the game tied 3–3 in the first overtime, goaltender Kirk McLean made what became known thereafter as "The Save", sliding across the crease feet-first and stacking his pads on the goal line to stop Robert Reichel on a one-timer pass from Theoren Fleury. The following period, Bure received a breakaway pass from defenceman Jeff Brown before deking Calgary goaltender Mike Vernon to score and win the series. Fifteen years later, Bure's goal and McLean's save were ranked first and second in a Vancouver Sun article listing the "40 most memorable moments in team history".

Following their victory over the Flames, the Canucks then went on to defeat both the Dallas Stars and Toronto Maple Leafs (both in five games) en route to the franchise's second Stanley Cup Final appearance. Forward Greg Adams sent the Canucks into the Finals with a double-overtime goal against Maple Leafs goaltender Felix Potvin in game five. Staging the second coast-to-coast Finals in league history, the Canucks were matched against the Presidents' Trophy-winning New York Rangers. Vancouver won game one, 3–2 in overtime, largely due to a 52-save performance by goaltender McLean. After losing games two, three and four, the Canucks won the next two to force a game seven at Madison Square Garden on June 14, 1994. Despite a two-goal effort (one on a shorthanded breakaway) from Linden (who was playing with cracked ribs), Vancouver lost the game 3–2. The Canucks' efforts to tie the game included a post hit by forward Nathan LaFayette with just over a minute remaining in regulation. The loss was followed by a riot in Downtown Vancouver, which resulted in property damage, injuries and arrests. Two days after the riots, the team held a rally at BC Place attended by 45,000 fans, who congratulated the team for their effort.

=== 1994–2001 ===
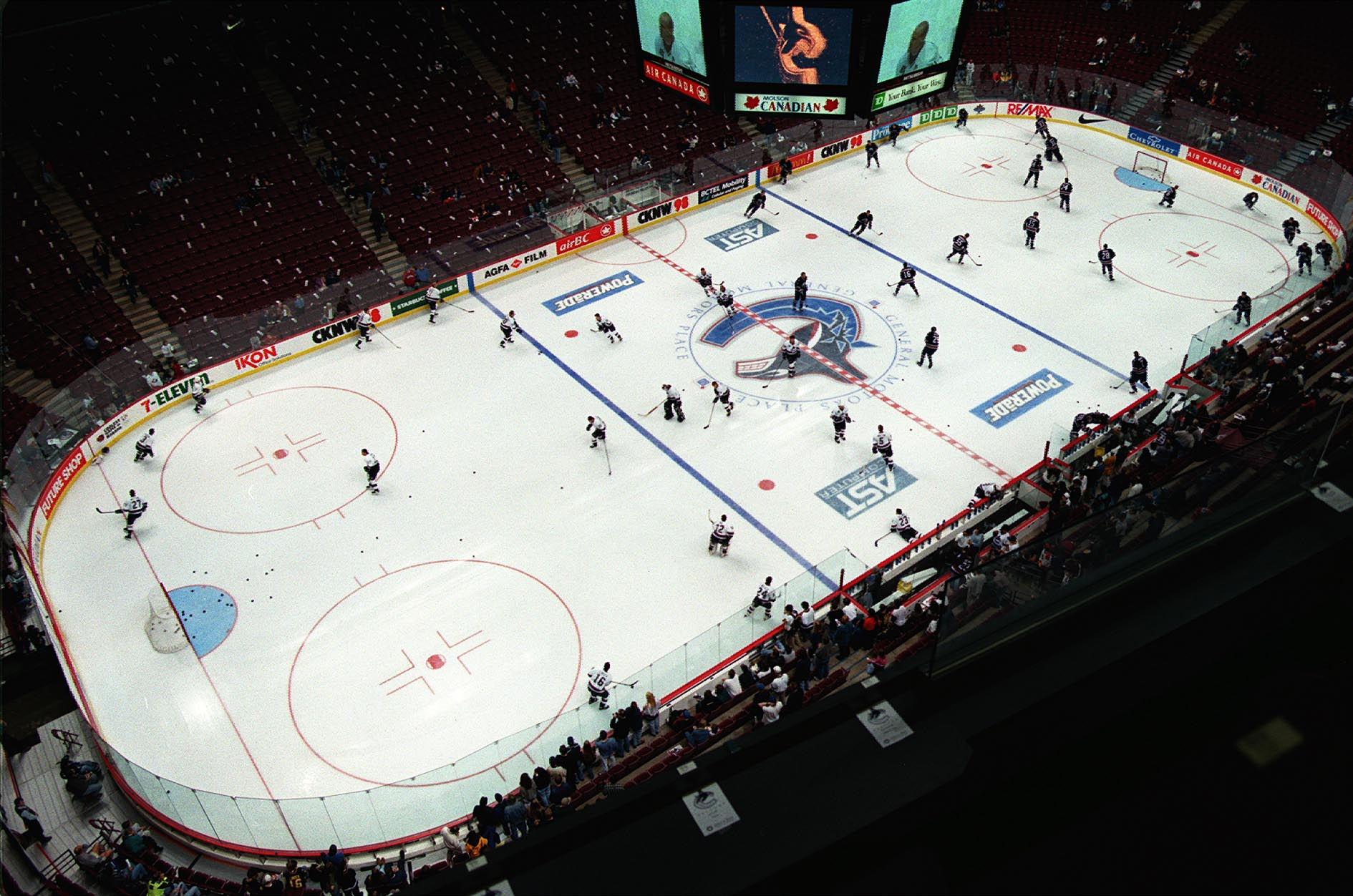
General Motors Place prior to a Canucks game, October 1997. The Canucks moved into General Moters Place (since renamed Rogers Arena) in 1995.

With a young core that included Linden, Bure and McLean still in their twenties after the 1994 playoffs, the Canucks appeared poised to remain contenders in the league. However, the team failed to record a winning season in the six years following their Stanley Cup Final appearance. Prior to the lockout-shortened 1994–95 season, Quinn stepped down as head coach to focus on his managerial duties and was replaced by Rick Ley; Vancouver finished with a .500 record that year. Their elimination from the 1995 Stanley Cup playoffs in game four of the second round marked the Canucks' last game played at the Pacific Coliseum, as the team moved into the General Motors Place (since renamed Rogers Arena), a new $160 million arena situated in Downtown Vancouver, the following season.

The Canucks made another significant move in the off-season by acquiring high-scoring Russian forward Alexander Mogilny from the Buffalo Sabres, reuniting Bure with his former CSKA Moscow and national team linemate. While Mogilny became the second player in team history to record 50 goals and 100 points in a season, the expected chemistry between him and Bure never materialized as the latter suffered a season-ending knee injury early in the campaign. Vancouver finished 1995–96 two games below .500 and were defeated in the first round of the playoffs by the Colorado Avalanche. The season also marked the arrival of another future Canucks superstar, as Markus Naslund was acquired from the Pittsburgh Penguins in exchange for Alek Stojanov. The deal is regarded as one of the most lopsided trades in NHL history as Stojanov soon became a minor-leaguer, while Naslund became the team's all-time leading goal- and point-scorer years later.

In the 1996 off-season. Ley was replaced by Tom Renney, who lasted for less than two seasons. Despite strong performances from Mogilny and team-leading point-scorer Martin Gelinas in Bure and Linden's absence (both of whom were injured for long periods of time during the season), the Canucks missed the playoffs for the first of four consecutive seasons that year. Making another high-profile acquisition in July 1997, the Canucks signed free agent Mark Messier to a three-year deal. They had come close to signing Wayne Gretzky the previous summer, but were reportedly spurned away when they refused to continue negotiations and gave Gretzky an ultimatum to sign.

Heading into the 1997–98 season, Linden resigned his captaincy for Messier, who had developed a strong reputation as a leader, having captained the Rangers over the Canucks in 1994 (he also captained the Oilers to a Stanley Cup in 1990). Linden later recalled regretting the decision, feeling that Messier generated hostility and tension in the dressing room. As the team's performance continued to worsen, starting the 1997–98 season with 3 wins in the first 16 games, Quinn was fired as general manager after ten years with the team. Soon thereafter, Renney was fired and replaced as head coach by Mike Keenan, reuniting the two figures from the Rangers' 1994 team. Keenan's hiring reportedly exacerbated tensions between groups of Canucks players and his negative relationship with Linden was given much media attention. Two months into his tenure with the team, his role was expanded and he was made de facto general manager. With control of player personnel, Keenan overhauled the roster, making ten trades within two months, most notably dealing Linden to the New York Islanders. Although the trade was unpopular with fans, the Canucks received winger Todd Bertuzzi in return, who would later become an integral part of the team's return to success in the next decade. After the Canucks finished the 1997–98 season last in the Western Conference, former NHL vice president Brian Burke was named general manager in the summer.

Suffering their worst season since 1977–78 the subsequent year, Keenan was fired midway through and replaced with Marc Crawford (who had won the Stanley Cup with the Colorado Avalanche in 1996). Meanwhile, Pavel Bure, unhappy in Vancouver, had withheld himself from the team and requested a trade at the beginning of the campaign. By January 1999, he was dealt to the Florida Panthers in a seven-player trade that also involved two draft picks. Finishing last in the Western Conference for a second straight year, Vancouver possessed the third overall pick in the 1999 NHL entry draft. Set on drafting highly touted Swedish forwards Daniel and Henrik Sedin, Burke orchestrated several transactions to move up to the second and third overall picks, with which he chose both players.

The Canucks began to show improvement in the 1999–2000 season, finishing four points out of a playoff spot. During the campaign, Mogilny was traded to the New Jersey Devils for forwards Denis Pederson and Brendan Morrison. With Bure gone and Messier in the last year of his contract, several previously under-achieving players began developing into key contributors for the team, most notably Naslund and Bertuzzi. In the off-season, Messier left the team and returned to the Rangers; during the team's September 2000 training camp, held in Sweden, Naslund was selected to replace Messier as captain, a position he held for eight years, tying Smyl's record. As part of the team's stay in Sweden, they played exhibition games against Swedish and Finnish teams as part of the NHL Challenge.

=== 2001–2005: "West Coast Express" years ===
Under the leadership of general manager Burke and coach Crawford, the Canucks once again became a playoff team. After qualifying for the post-season in 2001 and 2002 as the eighth and final seed in the Western Conference (losing to the eventual Stanley Cup winners Colorado Avalanche and Detroit Red Wings, respectively), the Canucks became regular contenders for the Northwest Division title.

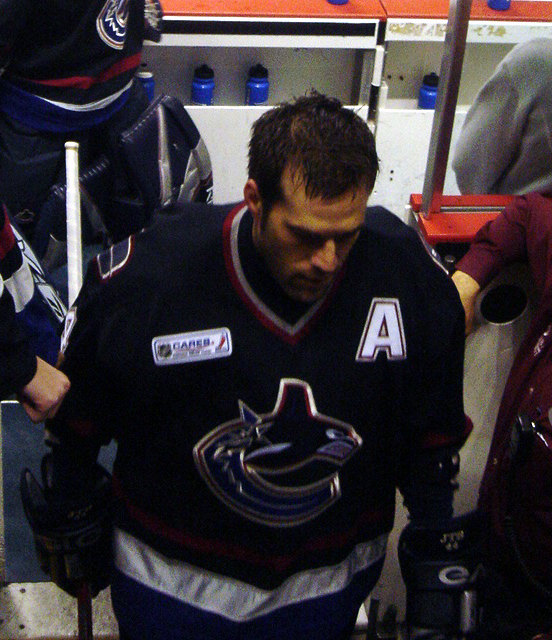
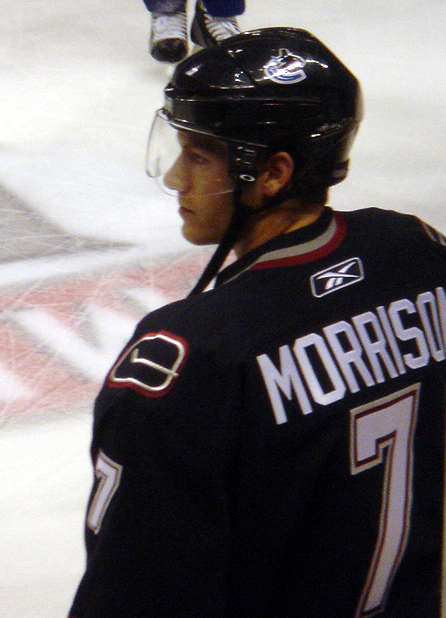
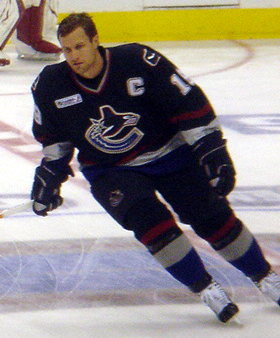
Todd Bertuzzi, Brendan Morrison, and Markus Naslund during the Canucks 2005–06 season opener. The three players formed the West Coast Express, a hockey line that played from 2002 to 2006.

Coinciding with the team's success in the early 2000s was the rise of captain Markus Naslund and power forward Todd Bertuzzi into high-scoring wingers and NHL All-Stars. Joined by center Brendan Morrison during the 2001–02 season, the trio were nicknamed the "West Coast Express" (after the Vancouver rail service of the same name) among Canucks fans and media. Over the next three years, Naslund ranked in the top five among league scorers and was a Lester B. Pearson Award winner and Hart Memorial Trophy finalist in 2003. Bertuzzi was also a top-five scorer in the NHL in 2001–02 and 2002–03. During this span, Burke made a trade with the Washington Capitals to facilitate the return of Trevor Linden. The ex-captain returned to a markedly different Canucks team with a young core consisting of the aforementioned trio, defencemen Ed Jovanovski and Mattias Ohlund, as well as goaltender Dan Cloutier.

In 2002–03, the Canucks lost the division title to the Colorado Avalanche on the last day of the regular season. Individually, Naslund was surpassed the same night by Avalanche forwards Peter Forsberg and Milan Hejduk for the Maurice Richard and Art Ross Trophies, respectively. Entering the 2003 playoffs with the fourth seed in the West, the Canucks won their first playoff series in eight years, defeating the St. Louis Blues in seven games before losing to the Minnesota Wild in the second round.

Amidst a run for the team's first Northwest Division title the following season, the Canucks received significant media attention for their involvement in a violent on-ice attack during a game against the Avalanche. On March 8, 2004, Bertuzzi grabbed Avalanche forward Steve Moore from behind and punched him the head. As Moore fell to the ice, Bertuzzi landed on top of him; Moore suffered three fractured neck vertebrae, facial cuts and a concussion. Bertuzzi's actions were in retaliation of a hit that Moore landed on Naslund during a previous game between the two teams. For his actions, Bertuzzi was suspended by the NHL and International Ice Hockey Federation (IIHF) through to the start of the 2005–06 season. He also faced legal action in British Columbia court, while Moore filed lawsuits against him and the Canucks organization in Colorado and Ontario courts.

The Canucks went on to win their first Northwest Division title that season, but lost in the first round of the 2004 playoffs to the Calgary Flames. After their elimination, Burke's contract as general manager was not renewed and he was replaced by assistant general manager and director of hockey operations Dave Nonis. At age 37, he was the youngest general manager in team history. Due to the NHL lockout, the 2004–05 season was not played. Several Canucks players went overseas to Europe to play professionally, such as Naslund and the Sedins, who all returned to their former Swedish team, Modo Hockey.

=== 2005–2011: Post-lockout ===
Upon the resolution of the labour dispute between NHL players and owners, new gameplay rules were set in place for the 2005–06 season that were supposed to benefit skilled players and generate more scoring. As the Canucks' basis of success in previous seasons was built on playing a fast-paced, high-scoring style of play, expectations for the team were high going into the season. (Note: For example: decreased tolerance for impeding a player as he is skating, four-foot increase length-wise in the offensive zones, abolishment of the two-line pass rule (i.e., passing the puck from the defending zone to the opposing side of centre) and a decrease in goaltending equipment size.) However, the team failed to qualify for the playoffs, completing the regular season ninth place in the West. The first line of Naslund, Bertuzzi and Morrison suffered offensively, as all three players recorded decreased points totals. Head coach Marc Crawford later recalled the campaign as a turning point for the team's offensive leadership as Daniel and Henrik Sedin began their rise to stardom, matching the top line's production. Crawford was fired in the off-season and replaced with Alain Vigneault, who had been coach of the team's American Hockey League (AHL) affiliate, the Manitoba Moose. Three days after Vigneault's hiring, Nonis dealt Bertuzzi to the Florida Panthers, ending the "West Coast Express" era. In return, the Canucks received All-Star goaltender Roberto Luongo as part of a six-player trade. With the acquisition of Luongo, Cloutier was traded to the Los Angeles Kings.

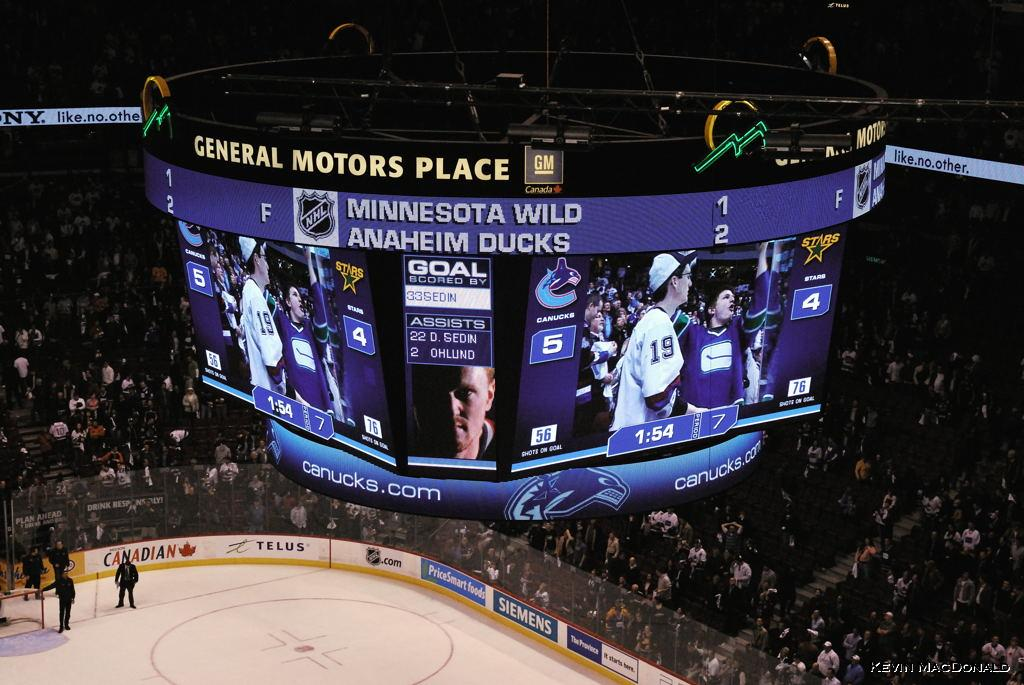
Scoreboard after game one of the 2007 Western Conference Quarterfinals between the Canucks and the Dallas Stars. Ending at the 138-minute mark, it was the longest game in the club's history.

With widespread changes to team personnel in 2006–07, the Canucks won the Northwest Division title for the second time in three seasons. In his first season with the Canucks, Luongo was nominated for the Hart Memorial and Vezina Trophies. He also tied Bernie Parent for the second-most wins in a single-season by an NHL goaltender with 47. The Canucks opened the 2007 playoffs with a quadruple-overtime win against the Dallas Stars. Ending at the 138-minute mark, the game was the longest in club history and the sixth-longest in league history. The Canucks also set an NHL record for shots against in one game, allowing 76. Vancouver won the series in seven games despite a lack of goal-scoring; Stars goaltender Marty Turco recorded three shutouts in the series, becoming the only goalie to achieve the feat and still lose a series. Advancing to the second round, the team was defeated by the Anaheim Ducks, who went on to win the Stanley Cup that year, in five games. Following the playoffs, coach Vigneault received the Jack Adams Award.

Suffering numerous injuries to players in the 2007–08 season, the Canucks struggled and finished three points out of a playoff spot. The final game of the season, a 7–1 loss to the Calgary Flames, marked Trevor Linden's last NHL game, as the former Canucks' all-time leading scorer retired. Having missed the playoffs for the second time in three years, the team underwent numerous personnel changes in the off-season. After Nonis was fired and replaced with former player agent Mike Gillis in April 2008, longtime Canucks captain Markus Naslund, as well as Brendan Morrison, were let go via free agency. Also in the off-season, on May 29, 2008, the Canucks lost defensive prospect Luc Bourdon to a motorcycle crash near his hometown of Shippagan, New Brunswick.

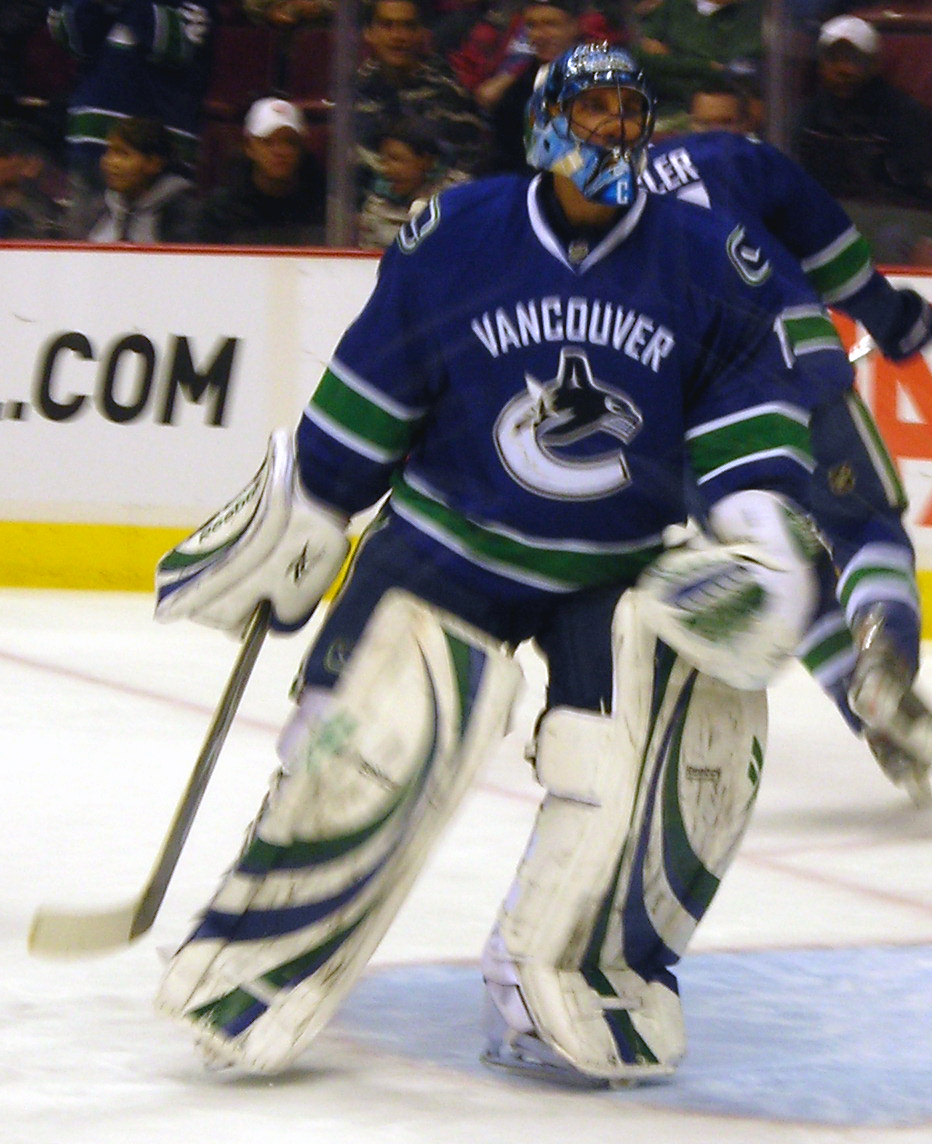
Roberto Luongo during the 2008–09 season, with a C visible on his goalie mask denoting his captaincy. He was named captain of the Canucks in September 2008.

With Naslund's departure, Gillis announced on September 30, 2008, that Luongo had been named team captain, marking the first time since Bill Durnan of the Montreal Canadiens in 1947 that a goaltender that a goaltender had been named the captain of their NHL team. During the ensuing season, the Canucks retired their second jersey number in team history, hanging Linden's number 16 beside Smyl's number 12 in a pre-game ceremony on December 17, 2008. Later that month, the Canucks acquired unrestricted free agent Mats Sundin. The arrival of the former Toronto Maple Leafs captain and 500-goal scorer in the NHL came with expectations. However, Sundin scored at a pace below his usual pace and retired in the off-season. The team finished the regular season with another Northwest Division title and the third seed in the Western Conference. In the 2009 playoffs, the Canucks swept their first round series against the St. Louis Blues (the first four-game sweep in franchise history), but were defeated in six games by the Chicago Blackhawks in the second round.

In the 2009–10 season, the Canucks faced the longest road trip in NHL history, with 14 games over 6 weeks, from January 27 to March 13, 2010. The scheduling was a result of Vancouver hosting the 2010 Winter Olympics, which shut down the NHL for two weeks, facilitating GM Place's use for ice hockey during the games. It marked the first time an NHL market hosted an Olympics since the NHL allowed its players to compete in the games, beginning with the 1998 Games in Nagano. Among the several Canucks players named to their respective national teams, centre Ryan Kesler of the United States and goaltender Roberto Luongo of Canada played against each other in the gold medal game; Luongo and Team Canada emerged with the win.

As the NHL season resumed, Henrik Sedin went on to become the first Canucks player to win the Art Ross and Hart Memorial Trophies as the NHL's leading scorer and most valuable player, respectively. He achieved the feat with a franchise record 112 points, surpassing Bure's mark of 110 set in 1991–92. Vancouver won the Northwest Division title and finished third in the Western Conference for the second straight year. They opened the playoffs by defeating the sixth-place Los Angeles Kings in six games, but were once again eliminated by Chicago, who went on to win the Stanley Cup that year, the following round in six games.

==== 40th anniversary season and 2011 Stanley Cup run ====
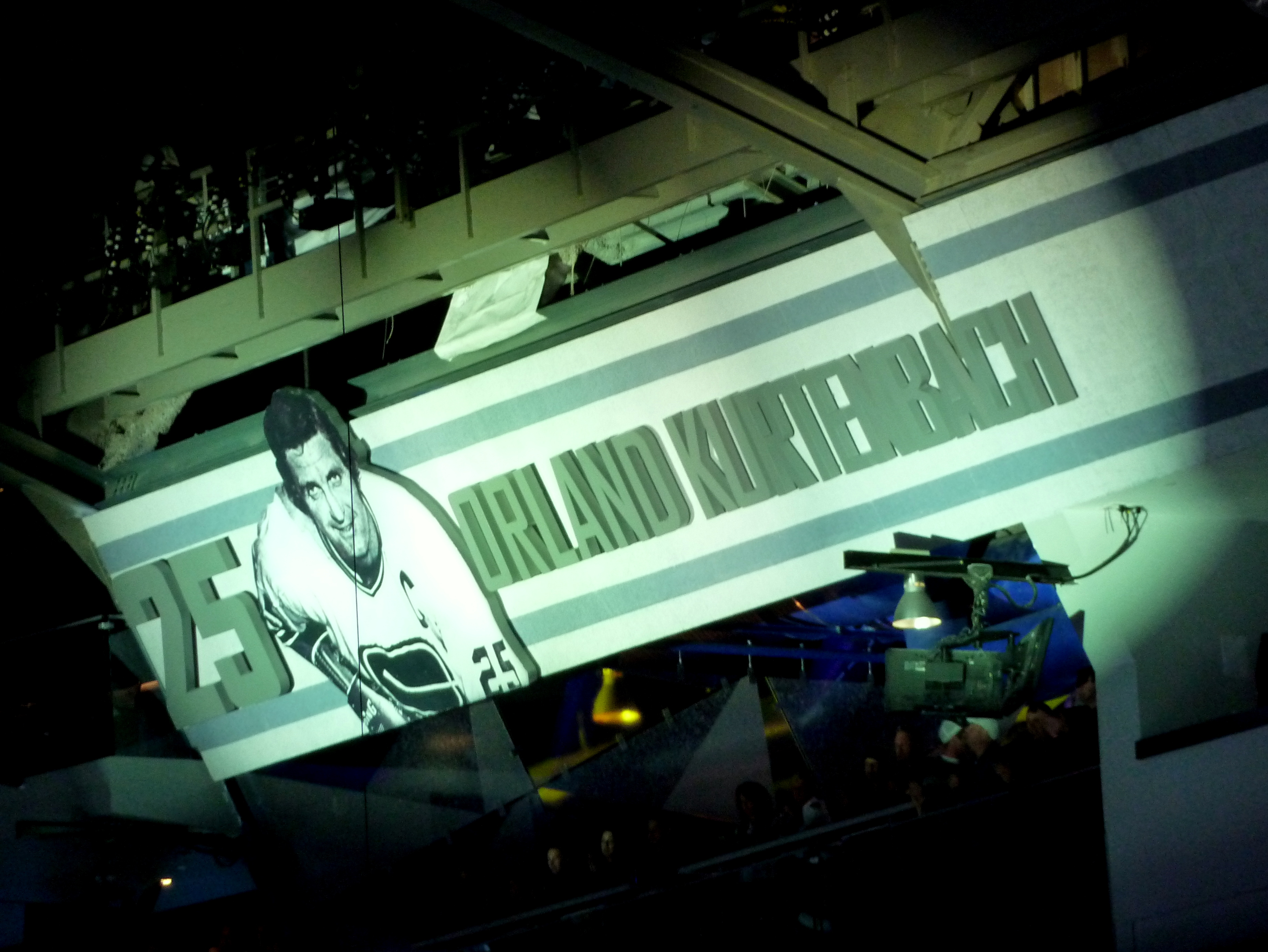
Orland Kurtenbach's plaque on the Canuck's Ring of Honour, which was established as a part of the franchise's 40th anniversary season.

The 2010–11 season began on October 9, 2010, with a pre-game ceremony to commemorate the team's 40-year anniversary. Henrik Sedin was officially named in the ceremony as the team's new captain, replacing Luongo, who had relinquished his captaincy in the off-season. The Canucks played the Los Angeles Kings, their first opponent in their inaugural season in 1970; both teams wore their original uniforms used in the Canucks' inaugural game. Throughout the season, the Canucks continued to celebrate their 40th anniversary with the creation of the "Ring of Honour", a permanent in-arena display commemorating their most significant players from past years. Four players were inducted during the campaign: Orland Kurtenbach, Kirk McLean, Thomas Gradin and Harold Snepsts. In December 2010, the Canucks also honoured Markus Naslund by retiring his number 19 jersey. Naslund had retired two years after leaving the Canucks in 2008.

During the second half of the campaign, the Canucks were in a battles for the Western Conference and Presidents' Trophy titles with the Detroit Red Wings and Philadelphia Flyers, respectively, widening the gap as the season progressed. On March 29, 2011, the Canucks clinched first place in the West for the first time in team history. Two days later, they accomplished another first by securing the Presidents' Trophy. Finishing with 54 wins and 117 points, the 2010–11 team broke the previous records in both categories by significant margins. Individually, numerous Canucks players had career years. Daniel Sedin won the Art Ross Trophy with a league-leading 104 points, marking the first time in NHL history that two brothers won the award in back-to-back years. Meanwhile, Ryan Kesler tied Daniel for the team goal-scoring lead with 41 goals. In goal, Roberto Luongo and rookie backup Cory Schneider captured the William M. Jennings Trophy for recording the lowest team goals against average in the NHL.

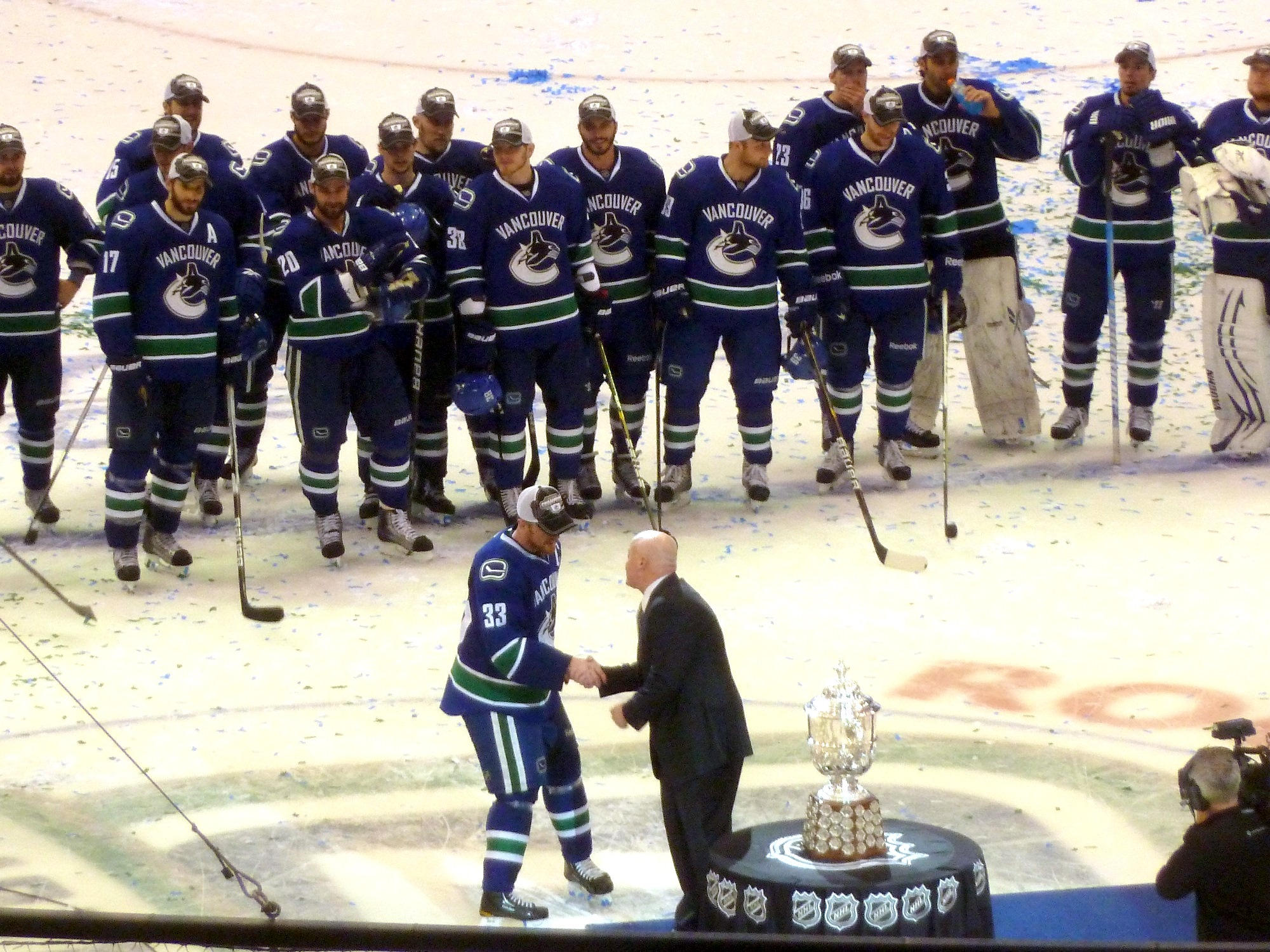
Henrik Sedin accepts the Clarence S. Campbell Bowl on behalf of the Canucks as the 2011 Western Conference champions.

Entering the 2011 Stanley Cup playoffs, the Canucks were paired with the eighth-seeded and defending Stanley Cup champion Chicago Blackhawks, who had eliminated Vancouver in the previous two years. While Vancouver initially took a 3–0 lead in the series, Chicago came back to also win three straight games and force the series into a game seven. Luongo, who had a history of struggling against the Blackhawks, was pulled in games four and five; he also began game six on the bench in favour of Cory Schneider before returning as the starter in game seven. In the deciding game, Vancouver held a 1–0 lead with less than two minutes remaining in regulation when they gave up a shorthanded goal to Chicago captain Jonathan Toews. Forced into overtime, winger Alexandre Burrows scored his second goal of the game following a failed clearing attempt by Chicago defenceman Chris Campoli to win the series.

In the Conference Semifinals, the Canucks faced the defensive-minded Nashville Predators, led by goaltender Pekka Rinne. Of the 14 goals Vancouver scored in the low-scoring series, Canucks center Ryan Kesler registered a point in 11 of them, helping the Canucks defeat the Predators in six games. Facing the San Jose Sharks in the Conference Finals, captain Henrik Sedin led the Canucks with 12 points in the five-game series. Vancouver defeated San Jose four-games-to-one with a double-overtime winner from defenceman Kevin Bieksa in the fifth game.

Advancing to the Stanley Cup Final for the first time since 1994, the Canucks opened the fourth round against the Boston Bruins with a 1–0 win in game one. Winger Raffi Torres scored the winning goal with 18.5 seconds remaining. In the following game, the Canucks won 3–2 in overtime with Burrows scoring the winner 11 seconds into the extra frame, making it the second fastest overtime goal in Stanley Cup Final history. As the series shifted from Rogers Arena to TD Garden for games three and four, Boston tied the series with 8–1 and 4–0 victories. Game three marked the highest score by one team in a Finals game since the Avalanche defeated the Panthers in 1996. During the contest, the Bruins lost first-line forward Nathan Horton for the remainder of the series when he suffered a serious concussion from a late hit by Canucks defenceman Aaron Rome, who received a four-game suspension as a result. Returning to Vancouver for game five, the Canucks won 1–0 for a 3–2 lead in the series with a goal from late-season acquisition Maxim Lapierre in the third period. With an opportunity to win the Stanley Cup in game six in Boston, Vancouver lost game six by a 5–2 score to extend the series to a game seven. The Bruins' first four goals occurred in a span of 4 minutes and 14 seconds during the first period, setting a Finals record for the fastest four goals scored by a team (surpassing the previous mark of 5 minutes and 29 seconds set by the Montreal Canadiens in 1956). In game seven, the Canucks were shut out by the Bruins, 4–0 for a 4–3 defeat in the series, giving the Bruins their first Stanley Cup in 39 years.

==== End of the Gillis era ====
During the season-opening game on October 6, 2011, a ceremony was held to honour Rick Rypien, who died by suicide during the off-season. For the rest of the season, the players wore decals on their helmets saying "37 RYP." The Canucks were strong contenders for much of the 2011–12 season, and clinched Presidents' Trophy, for the second consecutive year. Despite projections for another Stanley Cup run at the outset of the 2012 playoffs, the Canucks were eliminated in five games to eventual Cup champion Los Angeles Kings.

Prior to the start of the 2012–13 season, the league's collective bargaining agreement (CBA) expired. Unable to agree on a new CBA, the NHL enacted a lock-out on September 15, 2012. The lock-out continued on for 119 days, which resulted a shortened season. The Canucks wore Vancouver Millionaires replica jerseys on March 16, 2013, to celebrate the 100-year anniversary of the Millionaires.

Vancouver finished the year winning their fifth consecutive Northwest Division title, but were swept in the first round of the playoffs by the San Jose Sharks. Vigneault and his coaching staff were fired at the end of the season, and replaced by John Tortorella.

The Canucks participated in their first outdoor NHL game on March 2, 2014, a match against the Ottawa Senators at BC Place. The event was titled the 2014 Heritage Classic. Luongo was traded back to the Panthers during the season, while the team failed to make the playoffs for the first time in six years. This saw Gillis fired and Linden named president of hockey operations; Tortorella was also relieved as coach after his one season.

=== Jim Benning era (2014–2021) ===
On May 21, 2014, Jim Benning was announced as general manager, having previously served as assistant general manager of the 2011 Boston Bruins championship team that had beaten the Canucks three years prior. On June 23, 2014, Willie Desjardins was named the 18th head coach of the Canucks. The team underwent a series of changes under the new management: veteran forward Ryan Kesler was traded to the Anaheim Ducks, and defenceman Jason Garrison was traded to the Tampa Bay Lightning, while Ryan Miller and Radim Vrbata were signed as free agents. This season saw the team honour former general manager and head coach Pat Quinn, following his death, by renaming a city street after him (Pat Quinn Way) as well as having his family participate in a pregame ceremonial puck drop. The Canucks finished second in the Pacific Division in the 2014–15 season, reaching the 100 point plateau for the ninth time in franchise history. They faced the Calgary Flames in the first round of the playoffs, losing in six games.

As the team fared poorly throughout the 2016–17 season, more veteran players were traded: Alex Burrows and Jannik Hansen were dealt in an effort to rebuild. On March 25, 2017, the Canucks' 2015 first round pick Brock Boeser made his NHL debut in his home state of Minnesota. Desjardins and his coaching staff, with the exception of assistant coach Doug Jarvis, were let go at the end of the season, replaced by Travis Green who coached their AHL affiliate in Utica.They also added Nolan Baumgartner, Newell Brown, and Manny Malhotra.

The 2017–18 season was another poor year for the Canucks, but rookie Boeser was a bright spot for the team. Despite an injury late in the season, Boeser's 29 goals and 55 points in 62 games were enough to place him second in Calder Memorial Trophy voting for rookie of the year. Longtime Canucks Daniel and Henrik Sedin played their final game on April 7, 2018, against the Edmonton Oilers. On June 5, 2018, longtime Canucks' public address announcer John Ashbridge died, having worked in his capacity with the franchise since 1987. During the off-season, Linden stepped down as president of hockey operations.

The 2018–19 season saw the debut of the Canucks' 2017 first-round draft pick, Elias Pettersson. Pettersson broke the Canucks' record for points by a rookie, set by Ivan Hlinka (1981–82) and matched by Pavel Bure (1991–92), and finished with 66 points to lead all NHL rookies, winning the Calder Trophy.

The franchise celebrated its 50th season in the NHL, the 2019–20 season, with a ceremony at the home opener on October 9, 2019. Bo Horvat was named the 14th captain in team history, following a 1-year hiatus without a captain with the retirement of the long-time captain Henrik Sedin. The 2019–20 season also saw the rookie campaign of Quinn Hughes, who finished the regular season with 8 goals, 45 assists for 53 points in 68 games, finishing the runner-up in Calder voting. On February 12, 2020, Daniel and Henrik Sedin's numbers 22 and 33 were raised to the rafters before a game against the Chicago Blackhawks. On March 12, 2020, the Canucks and the NHL's season were suspended due to the COVID-19 pandemic. The Canucks won their first postseason series in 9 years in the 2020 Qualifying Round by defeating the Minnesota Wild before knocking off the St. Louis Blues in six games in the first round. They were then eliminated by the Vegas Golden Knights in seven games.

General manager Jim Benning, head coach Travis Green, assistant coach Nolan Baumgartner, and assistant general manager John Weisbrod were fired on December 5, 2021, after an 8–15–2 start to the 2021–22 NHL season. On the same day, Bruce Boudreau was named the 20th head coach of the Canucks.

=== Jim Rutherford era (2021–present) ===
On December 9, 2021, Jim Rutherford was named president of hockey operations and interim general manager. He hired Patrik Allvin as general manager on January 26, 2022. The Canucks missed both the 2022 and 2023 playoffs. During the latter season, they hired Rick Tocchet as coach.

The 2023–24 season was the first season with Hughes as captain and the first full season with Tocchet as head coach. With low expectations from fans and media at the start of the season, the team unexpectedly won their first division title since 2013, and their first-ever Pacific Division title. The Canucks qualified for the playoffs for the first time since the expanded playoffs in 2020 and played their first playoff games in Vancouver since 2015. The Canucks defeated their first round opponent, the wild card Nashville Predators in six games, but lost their second round series in seven games to the Edmonton Oilers. Following the season, Tocchet was announced as the winner of the Jack Adams Award and Hughes won the James Norris Memorial Trophy.

On January 19, 2024, the Canucks announced that they re-signed Jim Rutherford as the president of hockey operations until the 2026-27 season
