= Icebreakers (ice hockey team) =

Charity ice hockey team of Swedish NHL players

Icebreakers is a Swedish ice hockey team started in 2002 to raise money for charity. It was founded by businessman Peter Forsberg, a former ice hockey player, and Markus Näslund.

Their purpose is to raise money for a foundation who give scholarships to handicapped or otherwise needy children. They raise this money not only by playing charity ice hockey games, but also by attending auctions or playing celebrity golf.

The team consists of Swedish players in the National Hockey League. The larger part are players who were at one time or another members of the Modo squad.
