= Markus Näslund =

Swedish ice hockey player (born 1973)

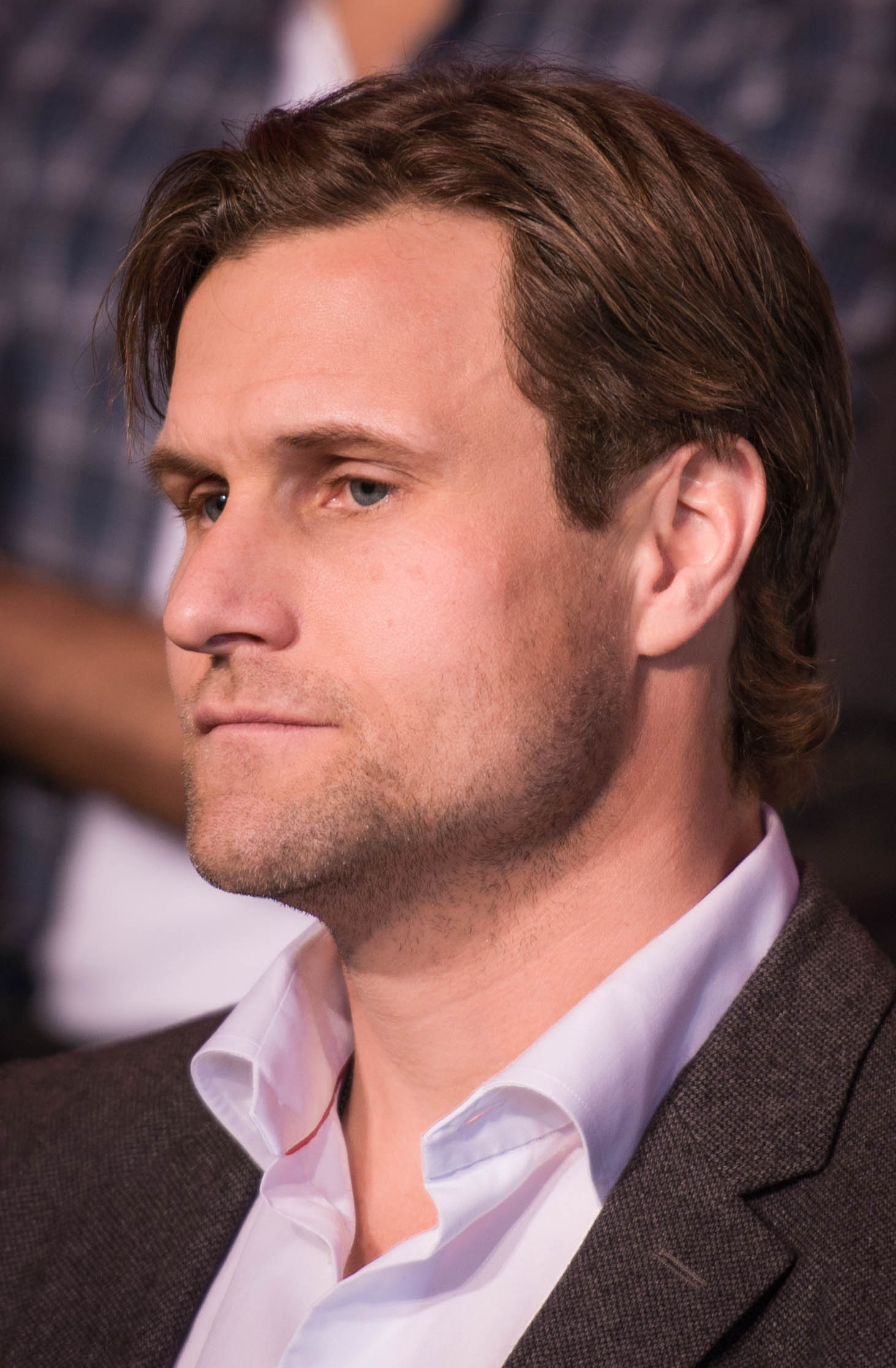
- Näslund in 2015
- Born: 30 July 1973 (age 53) Örnsköldsvik, Sweden
- Height: 6 ft 0 in (183 cm)
- Weight: 191 lb (87 kg; 13 st 9 lb)
- Position: Left wing
- Shot: Left
- Played for: Modo Hockey; Pittsburgh Penguins; Vancouver Canucks; New York Rangers
- National team: Sweden
- NHL draft: 16th overall, 1991; Pittsburgh Penguins
- Playing career: 1990–2010
Medal record
Representing Sweden
Men's ice hockey
World Championships
Bronze medal – third place	2002 Sweden
Bronze medal – third place	1999 Norway
Silver medal – second place	1993 Germany
World Junior Championships
Silver medal – second place	1993 Sweden
Silver medal – second place	1992 Germany
European Junior Championships
Gold medal – first place	1990

Markus Sten Näslund (born 30 July 1973) is a Swedish former professional ice hockey player and former general manager for Modo Hockey of the Swedish Hockey League (SHL, formerly named Elitserien). He played in the National Hockey League (NHL) for the Pittsburgh Penguins, Vancouver Canucks, and New York Rangers, as well as in the Elitserien with Modo Hockey from 1990 to 2010. Nicknamed "Nazzy" by Canucks fans and "Macke" or "Mackan" in his native Sweden, he was known for his offensive skills, particularly his wrist shot and stickhandling.

After playing junior hockey within the Modo organization, Näslund turned professional with the club's Elitserien team in 1990–91. Selected in the first round, 16th overall by the Penguins in the 1991 NHL entry draft, he joined the NHL in 1993–94. After his tenure with Pittsburgh, Näslund was traded to the Vancouver Canucks in 1996, where he spent 12 years, including a team record 8 as captain. With the Canucks, Näslund led the team in scoring for 7 seasons, was thrice first team All-Star, chosen in 2002, 2003 and 2004, a Lester B. Pearson Award recipient in 2003, and runner-up for the Hart, Art Ross, and Rocket Richard Trophies in 2003. He received the Cyclone Taylor Trophy as the Canucks' most valuable player five times and the Cyrus H. McLean Trophy as the leading point-scorer for seven consecutive seasons—both club records—en route to becoming the franchise leader in goals and points. In 2008, Näslund signed with the Rangers, where he spent one season before announcing his retirement from the NHL after 15 seasons. Midway through the 2009–10 season, he returned to play for Modo before retiring a second time. In December 2010, he became the third Canucks player to have his jersey retired, joining Stan Smyl and Trevor Linden.

Internationally, Näslund has competed with the Swedish national team in two European Junior Championships, two World Junior Championships, four World Championships, two World Cups and one Winter Olympics. He holds the World Junior record for most goals scored in a single tournament, scoring 13 in 1993, while also winning back-to-back silver medals at the competition. In World Championship play, he won a silver medal in 1993 and two bronze medals in 1999 and 2002. On 21 April 2014, Näslund was inducted into the Swedish Hockey Hall Of Fame.

== Early life ==
Näslund was born to Sture and Ulla Näslund on 30 July 1973 in Örnsköldsvik, Sweden. The city has produced numerous NHL players, including childhood friend and future Modo Hockey teammate Peter Forsberg, as well as Victor Hedman and future Canucks teammates Henrik and Daniel Sedin.

Growing up idolizing Swedish NHL and Elitserien star Håkan Loob, he played most of his organized hockey at an outdoor rink in his neighbourhood during his youth. At age 14, Näslund competed with the regional all-star team from Ångermanland, helping the squad win a national under-16 championship at TV-pucken in 1988. He received the Sven Tumba Award as the tournament's best forward.

Born within 10 days of each other, Näslund and Forsberg became well-acquainted while playing on separate youth teams. They went on to join the Ångermanland team together, before competing on the same side at the junior and senior levels for Modo Hockey and the Swedish national team. They attended high school together and had summer jobs at the age of 18 with the same electrical company that employed both Näslund's mother and Forsberg's father, Kent.

== Playing career ==
=== Modo Hockey ===
At age 15, Näslund played a season with Örnsköldsviks SK in Sweden's third-tier men's league. Appearing in 14 games, he scored 7 goals and 13 points. The following season, in 1989–90, Näslund joined the Modo Hockey organization, playing in Sweden's highest-level junior league, the J20 SuperElit, where he and Peter Forsberg skated together on one of the most productive lines in the league. The pair helped Modo to win back-to-back junior championships. After a season of junior, in 1990–91 Näslund joined Modo's professional team in the Elitserien, Sweden's premiere league. The Modo equipment manager designated him with the jersey number 19, which Näslund thereafter opted to wear with the Swedish national teams he played on. He recorded 10 goals and 19 points in his rookie season, a record points total for a 17-year-old in the league, until Robert Nilsson scored 21 in 2002–03.

In the off-season, Näslund was drafted 16th overall in the 1991 NHL entry draft by the Pittsburgh Penguins. The team's general manager, Craig Patrick, hailed Näslund and Forsberg as the draft's top two prospects behind first-overall selection Eric Lindros. He compared Näslund to the Los Angeles Kings' Swedish forward Tomas Sandström, although he did not consider him as aggressive a player, and further claimed that he was a more natural goal-scorer than Penguins forward Jaromír Jágr, who had just completed his rookie year with the club.

Näslund remained in Sweden with Modo for two more years, recording a team-leading 39 points in 1991–92. He matched that points total the following season before helping Modo to the quarterfinals of the Elitserien playoffs.

=== Pittsburgh Penguins ===
Following the 1992–93 season, his contract with Modo expired on 30 April 1993, and he had not yet come to terms with the Penguins. According to the collective bargaining agreement (CBA) between the NHL and NHL Players Association (NHLPA), he was entitled to free agency within the league, beginning on 1 July. However, a conflicting agreement between the league and Swedish ice hockey officials required that he sign an NHL contract on or before 30 June in order to leave Sweden. With the deadline approaching, Näslund filed a federal lawsuit against the NHL claiming that their agreement with Swedish officials could not override his rights as a player under the CBA. The case went to a federal judge in Newark, New Jersey, who ruled in favour of Näslund on 29 June. League president and lawyer Gil Stein released an affidavit stating the NHL-Swedish agreement did not apply to Näslund, as he was not under contract with any Swedish team.

Näslund became a Group 4 restricted free agent on 1 July. (Note: As a restricted free agent (RFA), he could entertain offers from any NHL team, but the Penguins could retain his rights by matching any given offer. The loss of an RFA is usually met by compensation to the original team from the signing team; however, signing a Group 4 RFA precluded any such compensation.) He did not receive any offers from other teams due to an apparent promise from the Penguins organization to exercise their right to match. After two months of free agency, Näslund and the Penguins agreed to a deal on 9 September 1993, worth approximately US$1.8 million over three years, including a $750,000 signing bonus.

Näslund subsequently joined the Penguins for the 1993–94 season. Due to teammate Bryan Trottier already wearing his Modo jersey number, 19, he chose number 29 instead. He appeared in his first NHL game on 5 October 1993 against the Philadelphia Flyers. Five days later, he registered his first NHL point, an assist, during a game against the Quebec Nordiques. His first NHL goal came the following month on 9 November 1993 in a 3–3 tie against the St. Louis Blues. The goal came in the first period on the powerplay against goaltender Curtis Joseph, assisted by Doug Brown and Marty McSorley. Upon entering the NHL, Näslund struggled and was admittedly frustrated with himself. As a result, he was demoted to the Penguins' International Hockey League (IHL) affiliate, the Cleveland Lumberjacks, on several occasions. He finished his rookie campaign with four goals and seven assists in 71 games. Although the Penguins qualified for the 1994 playoffs, Näslund did not participate in post-season play, being made a healthy scratch (non-dressing player), and watched as Washington eliminated Pittsburgh in the first round.

The following season, shortened due to the 1994–95 labour dispute, he continued to split playing time between the NHL and IHL. In 14 games with Pittsburgh, he scored two goals and four points, while recording seven points in seven games with Cleveland. He did not appear in the NHL playoffs for a second straight season, despite the Penguins qualifying. Instead, he was assigned to Cleveland for their playoff season, in which he recorded four points in four games. Frustrated by his ongoing demotions to the IHL, at one point during the season he requested to be traded from Pittsburgh.

Näslund impressed in his third training camp with the Penguins, held prior to the 1995–96 season. He was labelled in the media as "Mr. September", referring to his ability to show promise before struggling once the season began. Due to the departures of All-Star left-wingers Kevin Stevens and Luc Robitaille from the Penguins, Näslund had an opportunity for a more prominent role with the club in 1995–96. He played on the second offensive unit with winger Jaromír Jágr and centre Ron Francis during training camp before being moved up to the first line with Mario Lemieux. He showed an immediate improvement, starting the season with 36 points in 29 games. He recorded his first NHL career hat-trick on 28 November 1995 in a 7–2 win over the Ottawa Senators. However, his production slowed later in the season; he was scratched on several occasions and was demoted to the third and fourth lines by February.

=== Vancouver Canucks ===
==== 1996–2000: Trade to Vancouver and captaincy ====
In the final year of his contract with Pittsburgh, he was the subject of trade rumours. The Pittsburgh Post-Gazette listed the Edmonton Oilers as the most likely candidate to deal for Näslund. However, on 20 March 1996, he was dealt to the Vancouver Canucks in exchange for forward Alek Stojanov. The deal would be regarded as one of the most lopsided trades in NHL history once Näslund displayed his full offensive capabilities later in his career. Stojanov, who had been drafted eight spots ahead of Näslund in the 1991 Draft, went on to play 45 games, scoring two goals and four assists for the Penguins over the next two seasons. He became a career minor-leaguer and retired by age 29, while Näslund would eventually play 884 games with the Canucks in 12 seasons.

Näslund made his debut with the team two days following the trade against the Dallas Stars. As his desired jersey number 19 was already being worn on the team by Tim Hunter, the Canucks gave him number 22. Going pointless in his first nine games with his new club, Näslund recorded a hat-trick in the last game of the regular season, a 5–0 win over the Calgary Flames on 13 April 1996. The victory qualified the Canucks for the 1996 playoffs. He finished the regular season with a combined 22 goals and 55 points over 76 games between Pittsburgh and Vancouver. Näslund competed in his first NHL playoffs as the Canucks faced the Colorado Avalanche in the first round. He scored his first career NHL playoff goal in the final game of the series, opening the scoring against goaltender Patrick Roy on the powerplay. Colorado won 3–2 to eliminate Vancouver in six games. Näslund added two assists over the course of the series for three points total.

In the off-season, he was re-signed by the Canucks on 8 August 1996. Näslund switched his jersey number back to 19 from his time with Modo, as Hunter left the team. In his first full campaign with the Canucks, he recorded 21 goals and 41 points over 78 games. The Canucks failed to qualify for the playoffs that season; they would not return to the post-season until 2001. At the start of the 1997–98 season, Canucks head coach Mike Keenan scratched a healthy Näslund, prompting him to request a trade once again. He finished the year with 14 goals and 34 points over 76 games.

The following campaign, Näslund emerged as an offensive leader with the Canucks. Injuries to forwards Alexander Mogilny and Todd Bertuzzi, as well as the absence of Pavel Bure, resulted in Näslund earning more ice time. He scored his third NHL career hat-trick on 5 December 1998 during a 4–1 win against the Dallas Stars. At mid-season, he was named to his first NHL All-Star Game, held in January 1999. He went on to record a team-leading 36 goals and 66 points, resulting in him being awarded the Cyclone Taylor Trophy as the Canucks' most valuable player—his first of five during his tenure with Vancouver— as well as his first of two of the team's annual Most Exciting Player Awards (he received his second two years later). In the off-season, he was re-signed by the Canucks to a three-year, $7.2 million contract.

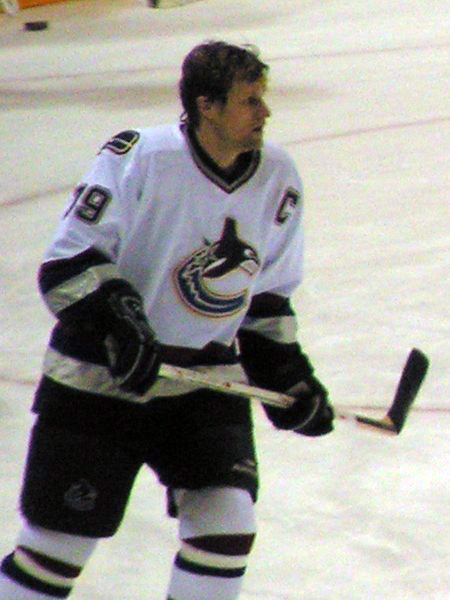
Naslund skating during warm-up with the Vancouver Canucks. Naslund served as the team's captain for eight years beginning in 2000.

During the Canucks' 2000–01 training camp in Sweden, Näslund was named team captain on 15 September 2000. He replaced Mark Messier, who had returned as a free agent to the New York Rangers, and became the first European-born captain in Canucks' history. Näslund has cited Messier as his greatest playing influence, having played alongside him the previous three seasons. In his first year as team captain, Näslund continued to improve offensively and was named to his second NHL All-Star Game, held in February 2001. With 10 games remaining in the season, he suffered a broken leg on 16 March 2001 during a contest against the Buffalo Sabres. Chasing a loose puck in the third period, he was hit by Sabres defencemen Jay McKee and Rhett Warrener simultaneously, falling awkwardly on his right leg. Näslund was sidelined for the remainder of the season, as he required surgery to repair broken tibia and fibula bones. His 41 goals at the time of the injury were tied for third in the league, while his 75 points ranked in 11th place. As a result, he received his first of three career Viking Awards, given to the best Swedish player in the NHL. Without Näslund in the lineup, the Canucks finished the season with the eighth and final seed in the Western Conference, but were swept in the first round by the Colorado Avalanche in four games.

The Canucks' return to the playoffs marked a turning point in the team's success. After undergoing a rebuilding period in the late-90s under leading point-scorers Messier, Bure and Mogilny, Näslund formed a new core that included Bertuzzi, Brendan Morrison, Ed Jovanovski and Mattias Öhlund. He recalls "grow[ing] up together in the early 2000s" with this group of players as his "fondest memory" in the NHL. (Note: Näslund, Bertuzzi, Morrison, Jovanovski and Öhlund were all in the same age group, in their mid to late-twenties.)

==== 2001–2005 West Coast Express ====
Set to enter the final year of his contract, Näslund re-signed with the Canucks to a three-year extension on 28 June 2001. He spent the off-season rehabilitating his leg, which was held together with a titanium rod and screws following surgery, at his private gym in his hometown of Örnsköldsvik. He returned from his injury in 2001–02 and improved to 40 goals and 90 points, which ranked second in the league behind Jarome Iginla. The 2001–02 campaign marked the beginning of what was widely considered the most effective line combination in the league for several seasons. Näslund and Bertuzzi had already formed a duo as wingers on the Canucks' top line for more than two seasons when head coach Marc Crawford replaced centre Andrew Cassels with Brendan Morrison during a game on 9 January 2002. The trio were dubbed the "West Coast Express", named after Vancouver's commuter rail service of the same name.

The formation of Näslund's new line coincided with an eight-goal, 21-point effort over 14 games in January 2002, earning him NHL Player of the Month honours. He was later chosen to represent the World Team at the 2002 NHL All-Star Game in Los Angeles and scored the game-winning goal in an 8–5 victory over the North American team. The Canucks finished the season with the eighth seed in the Western Conference for the second straight year, resulting in a first-round playoff match-up with the Detroit Red Wings. It was Näslund's first appearance in the post-season since his initial year with the Canucks in 1996. He was limited to a goal and an assist as Vancouver was eliminated by a Detroit side captained by the legendary Steve Yzerman and backstopped by perennial All-Star and future Hall of Famer Dominic Hasek. The Canucks fell in six games, despite winning the opening two games of the series. In the off-season, Näslund received NHL first team All-Star honours as the league's top left-winger. He also finished fifth in Hart Memorial Trophy balloting.

In 2002–03, with the West Coast Express line intact for a full season, Näslund finished with a career-high of 48 goals and 104 points, finishing second in the league in both categories. Furthermore, he led the league with 54 powerplay points and 12 game-winning goals. Näslund's linemates also produced career seasons as Bertuzzi recorded 97 points, which ranked fifth in league scoring, while Morrison tallied 71. Together, the trio accounted for 45% of the Canucks' 264 goals.

Early in the season, Näslund scored his eighth career NHL hat-trick, scoring three goals in a seven-minute span during the second period of a 5–2 win over the San Jose Sharks on 21 October 2002. On 14 December, he scored a career-high four goals in a 6–3 win over the Edmonton Oilers, tying a Canucks record for most goals in a single game. Named to his third consecutive All-Star Game, held in February 2003, Näslund scored a goal in the first shootout in All-Star Game history to help the Western Conference defeat the Eastern Conference 6–5. He was joined on the All-Star squad by three other Canucks – Bertuzzi, Ed Jovanovski and head coach Marc Crawford. Crawford paired Näslund on a line with Peter Forsberg, marking the first time in nearly 10 years the two had played together. Later that month, Näslund registered another career-high game with a six-point night (one goal, five assists) in an 8–0 victory over the Atlanta Thrashers on 14 February 2003. The win extended the Canucks' franchise record unbeaten streak to 14 games. On 27 March, he recorded an assist in a 5–1 win against the Phoenix Coyotes for his 100th point of the season, becoming the third Canuck to reach the plateau after Pavel Bure and Alexander Mogilny.

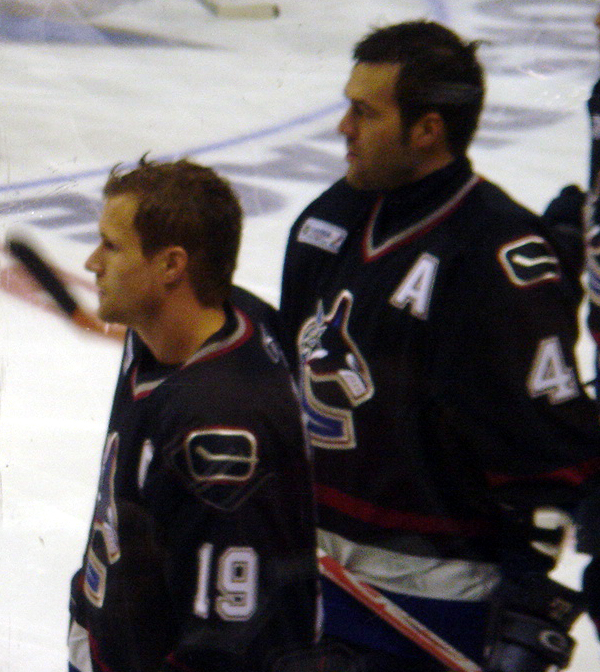
Näslund and Todd Bertuzzi (right) were joined by Brendan Morrison (not pictured) to form the "West Coast Express" line.

On the last day of the 2002–03 regular season, the Canucks lost the Northwest Division title to the Colorado Avalanche through a defeat against the Los Angeles Kings. Näslund had also begun the night as the league's leading point – and goal-scorer, but was surpassed by Avalanche forwards Peter Forsberg and Milan Hejduk, respectively. After the game, Näslund apologized to the home fans at General Motors Place, saying the team "choked." Qualifying for the 2003 playoffs, Vancouver won its first-round matchup against the St. Louis Blues in seven games after trailing the series three games to one. Näslund scored a goal in the deciding game to help the Canucks advance. Against the Minnesota Wild in the next round, the Canucks were eliminated by relinquishing a three-to-one series lead of their own. Näslund finished the playoffs with a career-high 14 points in 14 games.

In the off-season, Näslund received the Lester B. Pearson Award (since renamed the Ted Lindsay Award), given to the league's best player as voted by the NHLPA. By beating out fellow award nominees Forsberg and Boston Bruins centre Joe Thornton, he became the first Swedish-born recipient of the award, as well as the first Canucks player. He was presented the trophy during a ceremony at the Hockey Hall of Fame. Näslund was also a finalist for the Hart Memorial Trophy, awarded to the league's most valuable player as voted by the Professional Hockey Writers' Association. He finished as first runner-up to Forsberg, receiving five first-place ballots out of 62 compared to Forsberg's 38. Second runner-up Martin Brodeur of the New Jersey Devils had 14 first-place ballots, but less voting points overall than Näslund. (Note: Hart Trophy ballots rank five candidates on a 10–7–5–3–1 points system. Näslund had 342 points to Brodeur's 311.) Despite losing the Hart, he was chosen by The Hockey News as the league's most valuable player that year. Näslund also received both the Viking Award and First Team All-Star honours for the second time.

The following season, Näslund led the Canucks in scoring for the sixth-straight year. His 84 points ranked fourth in the league, while his 35 goals was seventh. His even-strength points topped the league at 58. It marked, however, the beginning of a consistent decline in offensive production for the remainder of his NHL career. He was briefly sidelined in early December 2003 due to a groin injury, but returned to score his second career four-goal game, scoring all the Canucks' goals in a 4–3 overtime win against the Pittsburgh Penguins, on 9 December 2003. At mid-season, he was selected as team captain for the Western Conference at the 2004 NHL All-Star Game in Minnesota.

On 16 February 2004, during a game against the Colorado Avalanche, Näslund received a body-check to the head from opposing forward Steve Moore. Outstretched to retrieve a loose puck, he was hit by Moore with his elbow and shoulder. The league's leading scorer at the time, he sustained a minor concussion, requiring 13 stitches on his forehead and nose, and was sidelined for three games. He also suffered a hyper-extended elbow when he fell to the ice, which he played with through the remainder of the regular season and playoffs. Moore's hit went unpenalized and several Canucks players vowed to exact revenge when the Canucks and Avalanche were set to play each other again on 8 March. Late in the third period of that subsequent game, Todd Bertuzzi skated behind Moore around the ice, punched him in the head and pushed him to the ice. Moore suffered career-ending injuries and Bertuzzi was suspended indefinitely by the league. A close friend of Bertuzzi's, Näslund was deeply affected by the incident, as subsequent lawsuits and public scrutiny negatively impacted Bertuzzi's career. Several years later, Näslund stated, "It still bothers me what Todd has had to go through...There's no question he was standing up for me...it all went too far."

Despite the absence of Bertuzzi for the remainder of the season, Näslund led the Canucks to the Northwest Division title they had lost the previous season. Bertuzzi was replaced on the top line by Matt Cooke. The Canucks' division title placed them third in the Western Conference standings, matching them against the sixth-placed Calgary Flames in the opening round of the 2004 playoffs. In the seventh and deciding game of the series between the two teams, the Canucks faced a one-goal deficit in the final minute of regulation time. With the Canucks having pulled their goaltender for an extra attacker, Näslund stickhandled the length of the ice past two defenders, before shooting the puck on goal. Calgary goaltender Miikka Kiprusoff saved the shot before Cooke scored on the rebound with six seconds left in the game. Despite the effort, Calgary subsequently eliminated Vancouver a minute-and-a-half into the subsequent overtime period on a powerplay goal. Näslund finished the playoffs with nine points in seven games.

At the end of the campaign, he received his second consecutive and third career Viking Award and First Team All-Star mention. In the three seasons from 2001–02 to 2003–04, Näslund scored the most goals (123) and points (278) of any NHL player.

During the NHL labour conflict, he returned to play for Modo Hockey of the Elitserien in 2004–05. Näslund announced his return in mid-January in order to meet the 31 January player-transfer deadline for European clubs, joining Canucks teammates Daniel and Henrik Sedin, as well as former Modo teammate Peter Forsberg on the squad. He was originally expected to sign with Modo before the season started in September, but he returned to Vancouver after spending the summer in Sweden. Vancouver radio-station Team 1040 cited high tax premiums explaining the decision, while Näslund later reasoned that he preferred to be readily available for the NHL, just in case the league and NHLPA could come to an agreement and the season was salvaged.

He played his first game for Modo in nearly 12 years on 20 January 2005, receiving a standing ovation from the home crowd. Näslund went on to appear in 13 games, scoring 17 points. Modo finished in sixth place during the regular season before being eliminated in the first round of the playoffs by Färjestad BK.

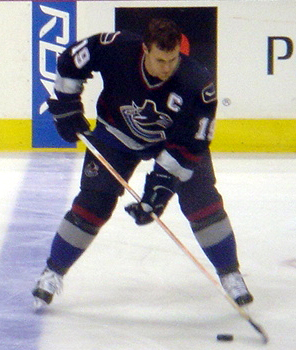
Näslund with the Canucks at the 2005–06 season opener

==== Post-lockout ====
As NHL play was set to resume for the 2005–06 season, Näslund became an unrestricted free agent. On the open market for several days, he re-signed with the Canucks for three more years on 3 August 2005, at $6 million per season. Vancouver newspaper The Province reported that two other teams had offered deals that matched the contract he signed, but Näslund ultimately chose to remain with the Canucks because he felt the club had a better chance of winning the Stanley Cup. At the time, Näslund said he hoped to retire as a Canuck.

For a franchise-record seventh consecutive season, he led the Canucks in scoring, with 32 goals and 79 points. Despite new NHL rules set in place after the lockout that sought to allow skilled players such as Näslund and his linemates to thrive, (Note: For example: decreased tolerance for impeding a player as he is skating, four-foot increase length-wise in the offensive zones, abolishment of the two-line pass rule (ie. passing the puck from the defending zone to the opposing side of centre) and a decrease in goaltending equipment size.) all three members of the Canucks' top line saw decreased offensive production in 2005–06. Furthermore, the Canucks failed to make the playoffs for the first time in four seasons, finishing at ninth place in the Western Conference, despite early-season projections to be Stanley Cup contenders. Consequently, significant changes to the Canucks' personnel were made in the off-season. Of particular significance to Näslund, longtime linemate Bertuzzi was traded to the Florida Panthers in exchange for goaltender Roberto Luongo, while Alain Vigneault replaced Marc Crawford with a more defensive-minded coaching approach. Crawford later recalled the 2005–06 season as a turning point in Näslund's role as the offensive leader on the team, noting that Henrik and Daniel Sedin had surpassed him and Bertuzzi in that respect as the campaign progressed.

Facing significant changes in the 2006–07 season, Näslund's points total continued to decrease. He began the season by scoring his 300th goal as a Canuck during the team's home-opener against the San Jose Sharks on 14 October 2006. The goal tied Canucks teammate Trevor Linden for the franchise lead in all-time goals. He soon surpassed Linden with his 301st goal against the Edmonton Oilers on 17 October. Near the midway point of the season, however, Näslund went through a 17-game stretch without a goal. He completed the season with 60 points, his lowest output since 1997–98. Teammate Daniel Sedin had 84 points, marking the first time in eight seasons that Näslund did not lead the team in scoring. In the 2007 post-season, Näslund contributed five points before the team was eliminated by the Anaheim Ducks in the Conference Semifinals.

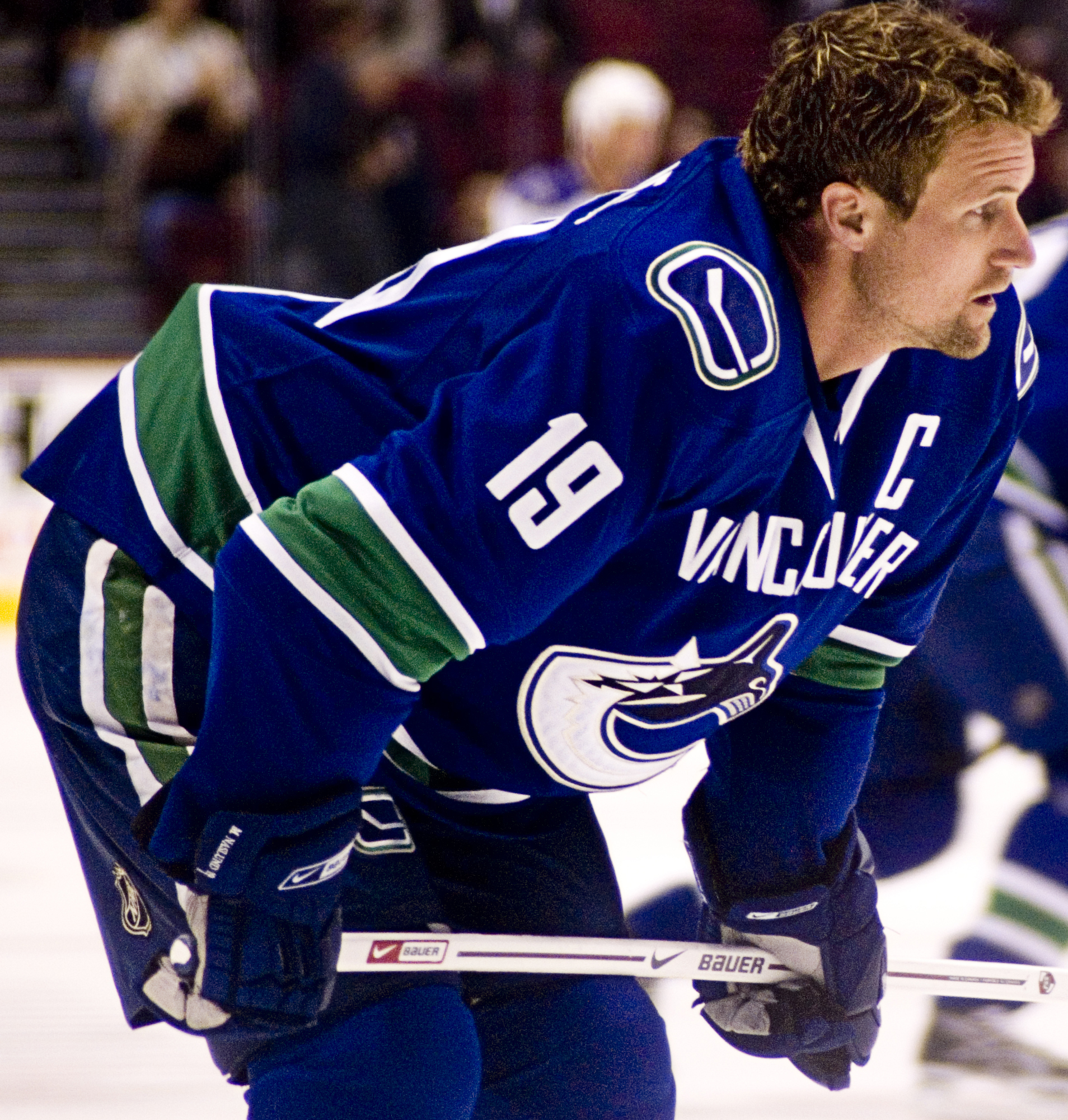
Näslund during his final season with Vancouver in 2007–08

In 2007–08, Näslund set several more career marks. On 21 November 2007, Näslund tied the Canucks' franchise record of 10 hat-tricks with a three-goal game against the Minnesota Wild, a 4–2 win for Vancouver. It was his first hat-trick since December 2003 and 11th in his career overall. Several games later, on 5 December, Näslund became the Canucks' franchise leading point-scorer, assisting on defenceman Mattias Öhlund's goal and passing Linden with 725 points. The following month, on 17 January 2008, Näslund played his 1,000th career game against the Detroit Red Wings, scoring a goal in a 3–2 shootout loss. Playing parts of the season on a line with Daniel and Henrik Sedin, he recorded 25 goals and 55 points.

As Näslund's free agency approached on 1 July 2008, Näslund made it clear that the style of play and the player personnel of a team would be important factors in determining which team he would sign with after his contract with the Canucks expired. He was admittedly frustrated with Vigneault's defensive coaching style. Furthermore, since Bertuzzi's departure in the summer of 2006, Vigneault placed Näslund on inconsistent line combinations, often with career minor-leaguers. While he did not rule out the possibility of returning to Vancouver, he sold his Vancouver home and described his return as questionable.

=== New York Rangers ===
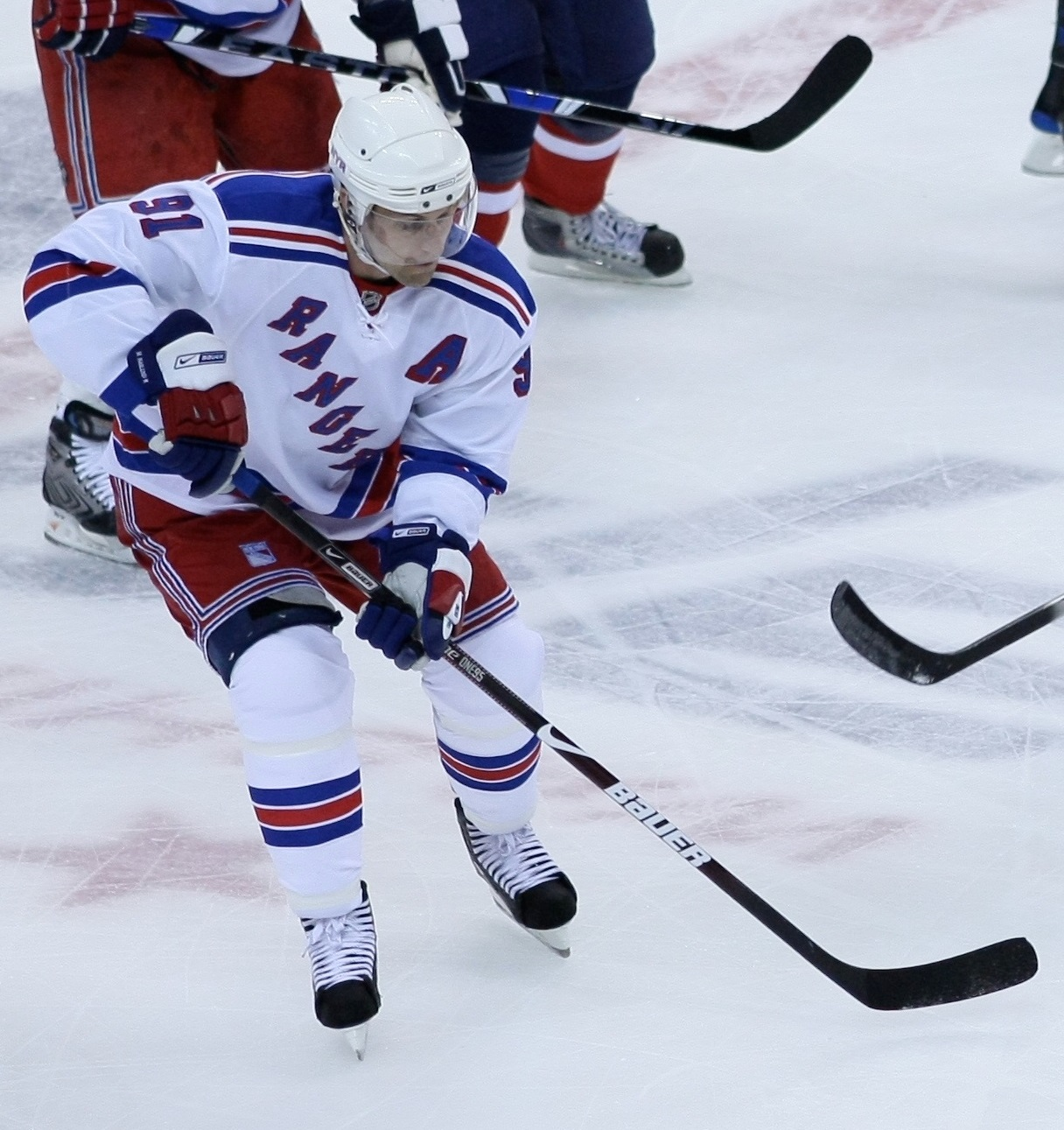
Näslund with the Rangers during Game 7 of the Rangers' 2009 Eastern Conference Quarterfinal series against the Washington Capitals

Näslund signed a two-year, $8 million contract, including a $1 million signing bonus, with the New York Rangers on 3 July 2008. Upon signing, he revealed New York was his preferred destination heading into free agency. He left Vancouver as the franchise's all-time leader in goals and points with 346 and 756, respectively. His departure also ended his eight-year tenure as team captain, matching Stan Smyl's captaincy as the longest in franchise history. General manager Mike Gillis, who formerly acted as Näslund's agent, released a statement on behalf of the Canucks organization, commending him as "one of the greatest athletes to ever represent the Canucks both on and off of the ice".

Näslund chose to wear #91 with the Rangers, as his #19 was already being worn by Scott Gomez.

As the Rangers held their training camp for the 2008–09 season overseas in Europe, they competed in a one-game challenge against Russian squad Metallurg Magnitogorsk on 1 October 2008 in Bern, Switzerland. The Rangers won the game 4–3, capturing the inaugural Victoria Cup. On 3 October, Näslund was named an alternate captain for the Rangers. The next day, he scored his first goal as a Ranger during the season-opener in Prague, Czech Republic, a 2–1 win against the Tampa Bay Lightning. In his only season with the Rangers, Näslund led the team in scoring with 24 goals and was fourth in points with 46. He added three points in the playoffs, as the Rangers were eliminated in the first round by the Washington Capitals.

Following the Rangers' defeat, he announced his retirement from the NHL on 4 May 2009, at the age of 35. Näslund had informed Rangers general manager Glen Sather, head coach John Tortorella, and his teammates of his intention to retire prior to the team's playoff elimination. By announcing his retirement early in the off-season, Näslund forfeited a $2 million buyout from the Rangers, (Note: According to the league's collective bargaining agreement with the NHL Players Association, the Rangers would have been required to compensate two-thirds of the $3 million salary he was set to make the following season.) which would have counted against the team's salary cap for the following season had he waited until he was formally bought out. Näslund retired from the NHL second among all-time Swedish players with 395 goals (behind Mats Sundin's 564; he retired the same year). His 869 points ranked fifth, while his 1,117 games played ranked fourth.

=== Return to Modo and retirement ===
Näslund returned to Sweden with his family in the summer of 2009. During this time, Peter Forsberg was attempting a return to the NHL for the 2009–10 season, playing with Modo and the Swedish national team for conditioning purposes. Among the NHL teams interested were the Vancouver Canucks. Näslund had previously tried recruiting Forsberg to play for the Canucks prior to the 2007–08 season, when Forsberg was an unrestricted free agent, without any luck. Weighing in on Forsberg's possible NHL return, Näslund speculated that Forsberg would remain in Sweden to continue playing for Modo. Several days later, Canucks general manager Mike Gillis confirmed Näslund's speculation, asserting that Forsberg intended on finishing the season with Modo.

The following day, on 17 November 2009, Näslund announced he was coming out of retirement to join Forsberg with Modo for the remainder of the 2009–10 Elitserien season. He explained that while he did not miss playing, both he and Forsberg desired to help their former club out of financial troubles and a last-place standing in the league, facing potential relegation. The announcement crashed the Modo web server as a result of the heavy volume of people visiting the site. As a board member of the club, Näslund said he and Forsberg would play without salary.

Näslund played in his first game back with Modo on 28 November, 11 days after the announcement, registering an assist on the first goal of the game by Forsberg. Modo won the game 4–1 over Rögle BK. The following match, on 1 December, he registered two assists, setting up the game-tying goal with two seconds remaining in regulation by team captain Per Svartvadet and the overtime-winner by Forsberg. He scored his first goal since his return on 8 December in a 4–1 win over HV71. On 27 February, he notched a hat-trick against Färjestad BK in a 10–3 win. Playing in 29 of Modo's 55 games, Näslund scored at a point-per-game pace with 10 goals and 19 assists. Ranked last in the league prior to Näslund's return, Modo went on to earn 58 points in the remaining 36 games of the season, but finished one point out of a playoff spot. Näslund confirmed his second retirement following the campaign.

At the start of the 2010–11 NHL season, the NHL and NHLPA honoured Näslund with a tribute and ceremonial puck drop prior to a game held in Stockholm, Sweden, between the San Jose Sharks and Columbus Blue Jackets. Several months later, the Canucks retired his number 19 jersey prior to a home game against the Tampa Bay Lightning on 11 December 2010. Attending the on-ice ceremony were his wife, three children, parents and sister, as well as former Canucks teammates, coaches and executives. The night included a video tribute highlighting his hockey career, speeches from team personalities and gift presentations from the organization. In honour of Näslund and his wife's past philanthropy in the Vancouver community, the team also announced the establishment of a sports equipment centre for underprivileged children. Prior to the jersey raising, Näslund thanked those involved in his career. Reflecting on his career, he commented, "Young hockey players from northern Sweden never dream of a night like this...To go from sitting up in the press box as a healthy scratch to be standing here in front of you is quite amazing." By having his jersey retired, he became the third player in team history to receive the honour, after Stan Smyl and Trevor Linden.

== International play ==
Näslund made his first international appearance for Sweden at the 1989 Four Nations Tournament in the Soviet Union. The following year, he competed in the 1990 European Junior Championships, an under-18 tournament. He went pointless in six games, but helped Sweden to a gold medal finish. He improved the following year with a tournament-leading 14 goals. His 16 points ranked second overall to teammate Peter Forsberg. Sweden failed to defend their gold medal.

Näslund continued to play in junior tournaments over the next two years, competing in the 1992 and 1993 World Junior Championships, where Sweden won back-to-back silver medals. During his first tournament appearance in Germany, he recorded 10 points, ranking third among all players, including a tournament-leading eight goals (tied with four others). Sweden finished second in the tournament's round-robin format to the Commonwealth of Independent States with a record of five wins, one loss and one tie.

The following year, Sweden hosted the World Junior tournament in Gävle. Näslund set a competition record for most goals scored in a single year with 13, while playing on a line with Forsberg and Niklas Sundström. His 24 points were second in the tournament behind Forsberg's 31. Although Sweden and Canada finished with identical records of six wins and one loss, Canada was awarded the gold medal by virtue of their 3–2 win against Sweden during round-robin play. Näslund was named along with Forsberg to the Tournament All-Star team.

Näslund made his senior international debut later that year at the 1993 World Championships in Munich and Dortmund, Germany, where he earned another silver medal with Sweden. He contributed a goal and an assist over eight games. Three years later, he was added to Sweden's roster for the 1996 World Championships in Vienna, Austria, after the Canucks were eliminated in the NHL playoffs. (Note: The World Championships and the NHL playoffs occur simultaneously.) He was pointless while competing in one game, as Sweden failed to medal. Several months later, Näslund competed in the inaugural 1996 World Cup, but was again limited to one game. Sweden reached the semifinal, where they were eliminated by Canada. Competing in his third World Championships in 1999, Näslund helped Sweden to a bronze medal with a 10-point effort in 10 games.

In 2002, Näslund made his first and only appearance in the Winter Olympics at the 2002 Games in Salt Lake City. He scored his first and only two Olympic goals during a 7–1 win against Germany. After going undefeated in the round-robin and heralded as medal favourites, Sweden was defeated by Belarus 4–3 in the quarterfinal. The loss was widely considered one of the most surprising results in Olympic history, while Näslund described the defeat in a post-game interview as "devastating...for us and our country." He finished the tournament with two goals and an assist over four games, ranking fourth on the team in scoring.

Several months later, he participated in his final World Championships in 2002, a tournament Sweden hosted in the cities of Gothenburg, Karlstad and Jönköping. He was added to the roster prior to the quarterfinal, following the Canucks' first-round elimination in the NHL playoffs. Sweden was defeated by Slovakia 3–2 in the semifinal. They went on to win their consolation match against Finland 5–3 to capture the bronze medal. It was Näslund's second bronze medal in as many tournament appearances; he scored three points in three games.

Prior to the 2004–05 NHL lockout, Näslund participated in his final international competition at the 2004 World Cup, where he failed to score a goal in four games played. Although he was named to Team Sweden for the 2006 Winter Olympics in Turin, Näslund chose not to play due to a groin injury. Sweden went on to win the gold medal, defeating Finland in the final.

== Playing style ==
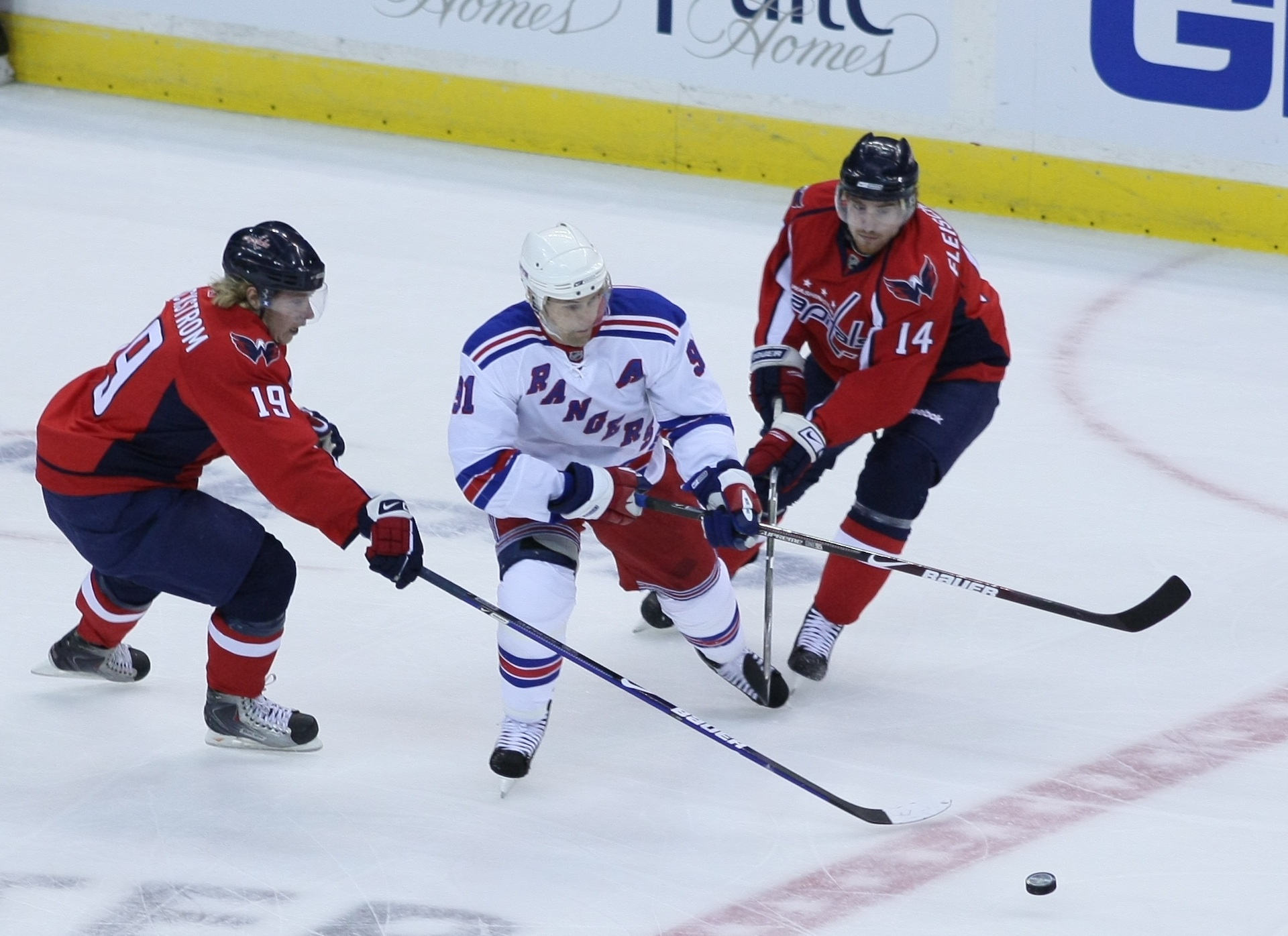
Näslund (centre) stickhandles through opposing Washington Capitals players during the 2009 playoffs

Näslund was known as a highly skilled offensive player with good skating and puck-handling abilities. The most prominent aspect of his game was his wrist shot, which was known to be one of the most accurate in the league and accounted for a large portion of his goals. He also earned many of his points on the powerplay. Regarding his skill level and creativity, his first Canucks head coach, Marc Crawford, heralded him as one of "a handful of players in this game who can take a play where there's nothing...and turn it into a scoring chance".

Näslund's prime coincided with the contributing performances of his linemates Bertuzzi and Morrison. His finesse and goal-scoring abilities were complemented by Morrison's playmaking and Bertuzzi's strength and aggression as a power forward. They were known for playing a fast and entertaining style. As a result, head coach Marc Crawford implemented a highly offensive coaching strategy.

As captain of the Canucks for eight years, Näslund was a self-professed "leader by example" with his work ethic and play on the ice. He was often criticized by the media and fans in his final few seasons with the Canucks for not being sufficiently vocal or emotional as the team's captain. Former teammates in Vancouver have described him as a quiet leader that spoke when needed nonetheless. They have also commended him for his integrity, professionalism and the caring manner in which he treated everyone in the organization. In particular, fellow Swedes Daniel and Henrik Sedin have singled him out as a player that mentored them early in their NHL career. New York Rangers general manager Glen Sather reiterated the guiding influence Näslund had on young players coming into the league.

These criticisms began especially in light of his decreasing offensive production following the 2004–05 NHL lockout. The decline was often attributed in the media to him becoming more defensively responsible under new Canucks coach Alain Vigneault. Bertuzzi's absence following the 2005–06 season was also seen as a negative factor for Näslund individually. It was further proposed that the physical effects of his concussion, as a result of Steve Moore's hit against him in 2004, as well as the emotional toll of Bertuzzi's subsequent retaliation against Moore strained his playing efficiency.

== Management career ==
Midway through the 2010–11 Elitserien season on 17 December 2010, Näslund was named the general manager of the Modo organization, overseeing all the organization's sports clubs. In his first season with the organization, the hockey club finished last in the Elitserien, six points out of a playoff spot. Facing relegation to the second-tier HockeyAllsvenskan, Modo finished second in the 2011 Kvalserien, retaining their Elitserien status for the 2011–12 season.

In the off-season, Näslund was joined by Peter Forsberg on Modo's management team. Forsberg was announced as Modo's assistant manager in April 2011.

== Off the ice ==
=== Personal ===
Näslund and his wife Lotta have three children: Rebecca, Isabella, and Alex. During his NHL career, they spent their summers in Sweden. Like Swedes Nicklas Lidström and his childhood idol, Håkan Loob, Näslund had expressed a desire to raise his children in his homeland Sweden. He made headlines when he first publicly contemplated an early retirement from the NHL to serve those purposes during the 2002–03 season. However, he also considered Vancouver his home and cherished his time spent in the city as a member of the Canucks.

Upon being signed by the Rangers, Näslund and his family moved to Tarrytown, New York. Following his retirement from the NHL in 2009, they returned to Sweden, where Näslund began coaching his son's minor-league hockey team before he became the general manager of Modo. He participated in the construction of a new house in Örnsköldsvik that his family moved into.

Markus has also ventured into business as a real estate developer.

=== Philanthropy ===
In 2002, Näslund and Forsberg founded Icebreakers, an organization that raises money for sick and disabled children in their home region of Västernorrland. A team of Swedish all-stars are annually assembled to host exhibition charity games against varying challengers.

In Vancouver, Näslund ran a program called "Nazzy's Suite 19" that gave underprivileged children the opportunity to watch Canucks games from a private suite in GM Place. Game attendees were chosen through local children's charities. The program was later taken over by Canucks goaltender Roberto Luongo and renamed "Lui's Crease Club" after Näslund's departure from Vancouver. Along with other Canucks players, Näslund made regular visits to Canuck Place, a children's hospice that provides specialized care for children with life-threatening illnesses; BC Children's Hospital; and was a contributor to the Canucks For Kids Fund. He also appeared in a public service announcement with BC Children's Hospital, educating provincial viewers on mental health issues.

Following his NHL retirement, he joined the anniversary tour of the NHLPA's Goals and Dreams program, a charity that donates hockey equipment to underprivileged children. Näslund began the tour in Örnsköldsvik before joining former Canucks teammates Jyrki Lumme and Pavel Bure for stops in Helsinki and Moscow, respectively.

=== Endorsements ===
At the peak of his career, Näslund signed multiple endorsement deals, most notably with Nike Bauer and Electronic Arts (EA). In 2004, EA Sports selected Näslund to appear on the cover of NHL 2005, EA's yearly hockey video game. He is also on the European cover of NHL 2000.

== Career statistics ==
=== Regular season and playoffs ===
			Regular season					Playoffs
Season	Team	League	GP	G	A	Pts	PIM	GP	G	A	Pts	PIM
1988–89	Örnsköldsviks SK	SWE III	14	7	6	13	—	—	—	—	—	—
1989–90	Modo Hockey	J20	33	43	35	78	20	—	—	—	—	—
1989–90	Modo Hockey	Allsv	2	1	1	2	0	5	0	0	0	0
1990–91	Modo Hockey	SEL	32	10	9	19	14	—	—	—	—	—
1991–92	Modo Hockey	SEL	39	22	18	40	52	—	—	—	—	—
1992–93	Modo Hockey	J20	2	4	1	5	2	—	—	—	—	—
1992–93	Modo Hockey	SEL	39	22	17	39	67	3	3	2	5	0
1993–94	Pittsburgh Penguins	NHL	71	4	7	11	27	—	—	—	—	—
1993–94	Cleveland Lumberjacks	IHL	5	1	6	7	4	—	—	—	—	—
1994–95	Pittsburgh Penguins	NHL	14	2	2	4	2	—	—	—	—	—
1994–95	Cleveland Lumberjacks	IHL	7	3	4	7	6	4	1	3	4	8
1995–96	Pittsburgh Penguins	NHL	66	19	33	52	36	—	—	—	—	—
1995–96	Vancouver Canucks	NHL	10	3	0	3	6	6	1	2	3	8
1996–97	Vancouver Canucks	NHL	78	21	20	41	30	—	—	—	—	—
1997–98	Vancouver Canucks	NHL	76	14	20	34	56	—	—	—	—	—
1998–99	Vancouver Canucks	NHL	80	36	30	66	74	—	—	—	—	—
1999–00	Vancouver Canucks	NHL	82	27	38	65	64	—	—	—	—	—
2000–01	Vancouver Canucks	NHL	72	41	34	75	58	—	—	—	—	—
2001–02	Vancouver Canucks	NHL	81	40	50	90	50	6	1	1	2	2
2002–03	Vancouver Canucks	NHL	82	48	56	104	52	14	5	9	14	18
2003–04	Vancouver Canucks	NHL	78	35	49	84	58	7	2	7	9	2
2004–05	Modo Hockey	SEL	13	8	9	17	8	6	0	1	1	10
2005–06	Vancouver Canucks	NHL	81	32	47	79	66	—	—	—	—	—
2006–07	Vancouver Canucks	NHL	82	24	36	60	54	12	4	1	5	16
2007–08	Vancouver Canucks	NHL	82	25	30	55	46	—	—	—	—	—
2008–09	New York Rangers	NHL	82	24	22	46	57	7	1	2	3	10
2009–10	Modo Hockey	SEL	29	10	19	29	20	—	—	—	—	—
NHL totals			1,117	395	474	869	736	52	14	22	36	56

=== International ===
Year	Team	Event	GP	G	A	Pts	PIM
1990	Sweden	EJC	6	0	0	0	2
1991	Sweden	EJC	6	14	2	16	14
1992	Sweden	WJC	7	8	2	10	12
1993	Sweden	WJC	7	13	11	24	33
1993	Sweden	WC	8	1	1	2	14
1996	Sweden	WC	1	0	0	0	0
1996	Sweden	WCup	1	0	0	0	2
1999	Sweden	WC	10	6	4	10	16
2002	Sweden	OLY	4	2	1	3	0
2002	Sweden	WC	3	1	2	3	0
2004	Sweden	WCup	4	0	3	3	0
Junior totals			26	35	15	50	61
Senior totals			31	10	11	21	32

=== All-Star Games ===
Year	Location	G	A	P
1999	Tampa Bay	0	1	1
2001	Denver	1	0	1
2002	Los Angeles	2	1	3
2003	Florida	0	1	1
2004	Minnesota	0	3	3
All-Star totals		3	6	9

== Awards ==
=== Sweden ===
Award	Year(s)
Sven Tumba Award (TV-pucken best forward)	1988
Viking Award (NHL's best Swedish player)	2001, 2003, 2004

=== International ===
Award	Year(s)
World Junior All-Star team	1993

=== NHL ===
Award	Year(s)
First All-Star team	2002, 2003, 2004
All-Star Game	1999, 2001, 2002, 2003, 2004
Lester B. Pearson Award	2003
EA Sports NHL cover athlete	2005

=== Vancouver Canucks team awards ===
Award	Year(s)
Cyclone Taylor Award	1999, 2001, 2002, 2003, 2004
Cyrus H. McLean Trophy	1999, 2000, 2001, 2002, 2003, 2004, 2006
Most Exciting Player Award	1999, 2001
Molson Cup	2001, 2002, 2003

== Records ==
=== International ===
- World Junior Championships' record; most goals, single tournament: 13 (1993)

=== Vancouver Canucks ===
- All-time hat-tricks: 10 (tied with Tony Tanti)
- Longest tenured captain: 8 years (2000–08)
- Single-season points by a left wing: 104 (2002–03)
- Single-season goals by a left wing: 48 (2002–03)
- Single-game goals: 4 (twice; 14 December 2002 vs. Edmonton Oilers; 9 December 2003 vs. Pittsburgh Penguins; tied with 10 others) (Note: Näslund shares this record with Rosaire Paiement, Bobby Schmautz, Rick Blight, Petri Skriko, Greg Adams, Tony Tanti, Pavel Bure, Martin Gélinas and Daniel Sedin.)

== See also ==
- List of NHL players with 100-point seasons
- List of NHL players with 1,000 games played

== Notes ==
Awards and achievements
Preceded by Jarome Iginla	Lester B. Pearson Award; 2003	Succeeded by Martin St. Louis
Preceded by Nicklas Lidström; Mats Sundin	Viking Award; 2001; 2003–2004	Succeeded by Mats Sundin; Nicklas Lidström
Sporting positions
Preceded by Jaromír Jágr	Pittsburgh Penguins first-round draft pick 1991	Succeeded by Martin Straka
Preceded by Mark Messier	Vancouver Canucks captain 2000–08	Succeeded by Roberto Luongo
