= West Coast Express (ice hockey) =

Trio of Vancouver Canucks ice hockey players

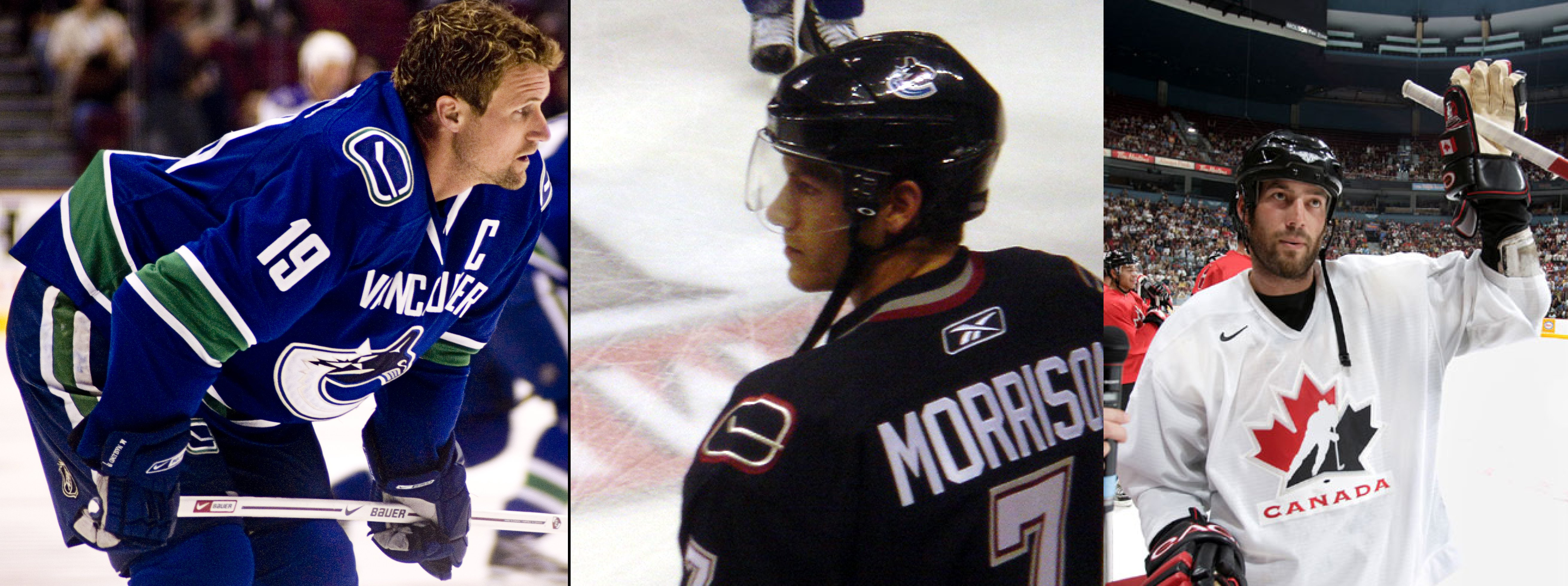
Markus Näslund (left), Brendan Morrison (centre), and Todd Bertuzzi (right) formed the "West Coast Express" line.

The West Coast Express was an ice hockey line that played for the National Hockey League's (NHL) Vancouver Canucks from 2002 to 2006. Named after Vancouver's commuter rail service, the line consisted of captain Markus Näslund at left-wing, Brendan Morrison at centre, and Todd Bertuzzi playing right-wing. The West Coast Express was a high scoring line that was considered to be one of the best lines in hockey during its tenure.

Each player was acquired by the Canucks through various trades. Once each member arrived in Vancouver it took two years before the line played together regularly. Once they did, they helped to set a Canucks franchise record for points in 2002–03 season (later surpassed), a season in which the West Coast Express accounted for 45% of the team's goal production. All three players recorded their most individually recognized and best statistical seasons while playing on the line. Despite regular season success, the Canucks were never able to advance past the second round of the playoffs during the West Coast Express years. The line was disbanded when Bertuzzi was traded to the Florida Panthers after the 2005–06 season. Both Morrison and Naslund played through the 2007–08 season with the Canucks before leaving the organization via free agency.

== History ==
=== Player acquisitions ===
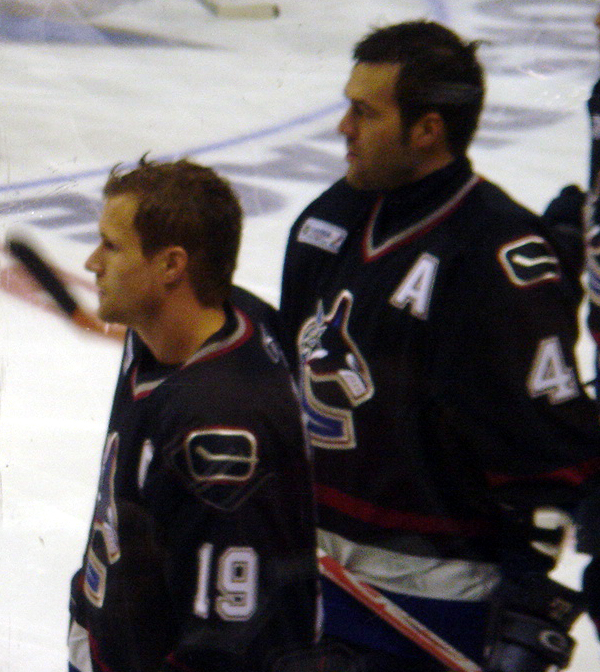
Markus Näslund (left) and Todd Bertuzzi (right) in the 2005–06 season opener.

The Vancouver Canucks made the Stanley Cup Final in 1994, but proceeded to regress as a franchise progressively finishing worse each season. As such they began attempting to add skill players to the line-up through trades. The Canucks made various deals to "move the program forward and in a different direction". With the franchise moving in a new direction the first member of the West Coast Express line arrived in Vancouver on March 20, 1996, when left wing Markus Naslund was traded to the Canucks by the Pittsburgh Penguins for Alek Stojanov. Naslund struggled to start his Canucks career and during the 1997–98 season he requested to be traded. It was not until the 1998–99 season that Naslund emerged as an offensive leader with the Canucks, leading them in goals (36) and points (66). Todd Bertuzzi was the second member of the line to join the Canucks' franchise, when he was acquired by Vancouver via a trade during the 1997–98 season. The New York Islanders received former Canuck captain Trevor Linden in exchange for right winger Bertuzzi, defenceman Bryan McCabe and a third-round selection in the 1998 NHL entry draft (Jarkko Ruutu). Bertuzzi began the 1998–99 season playing on a line with Mark Messier at centre and Alexander Mogilny on right wing. Bertuzzi played with the two until he suffered a fractured tibia, an injury that resulted in Naslund gaining increased ice time. The final piece came to the Canucks on March 14, 2000, with the acquisition of Brendan Morrison. In an attempt to improve their team to make a Stanley Cup run, the New Jersey Devils traded Morrison and centre Denis Pederson for Mogilny at the National Hockey League's (NHL) trade deadline. Upon his arrival Morrison did not begin playing with Naslund and Bertuzzi nor did he begin his Canucks' career at centre, instead he began on the wing.

=== Express years ===
Although the three did not begin playing together immediately, Bertuzzi and Naslund regularly played together on the top line with centres Mark Messier and Andrew Cassels. Starting with their arrival in 2000, head coach Marc Crawford often moved Bertuzzi to the second line to play with twin brothers Henrik and Daniel Sedin to complement their cycling game. Morrison spent time on the third line with agitator Matt Cooke. Morrison joined Naslund on the top line due to an injury to Cassels in early November of the 2001–02 season, the two were joined by Trent Klatt on right wing, with Bertuzzi playing on a line with the twins. During the game Bertuzzi joined Naslund and Morrison on a power play marking one of the first times the line was together. The Canucks won the game but the line did not remain together as Cassels returned from injury, Klatt was injured and Bertuzzi was returned to the second line. The first game the trio played together as a regular line was on January 9, 2002. In the game they registered two first period goals in a 5–4 loss to the Detroit Red Wings. Crawford liked the idea of having his two top scorers together, how Morrison worked with them on the power play, and felt Morrison could handle the demands of playing with two players who wanted the puck. In their second game together the line continued its strong play as each member recorded two points in a 7–1 win over the Carolina Hurricanes. After being put together they were given the name West Coast Express, a reference to a commuter train of the same name that provides service along a 65 kilometres (40 mi) route between Mission, British Columbia and Vancouver, British Columbia. By the end of the season each player set new career highs in points to that time in their careers. Naslund raised his point total by fifteen, finishing the year as the league's second leading scorer, up thirty-one spots from the previous season. Bertuzzi enjoyed the biggest point increase on the line adding thirty points and moving from eighty-first in league scoring to third. Vancouver finished the season as the eighth seed in the Western Conference. The West Coast Express totaled three goals and nine points in the playoffs before being eliminated in six games by the top seeded Detroit Red Wings. In the off-season, Naslund received NHL first team All-Star honours.

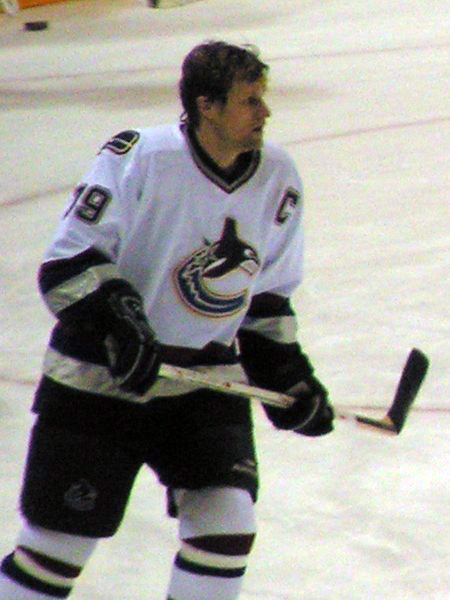
Naslund was an NHL first team All-Star three times during the West Coast Express years

The 2002–03 season was the West Coast Express' best season, as each member of the line again increased their point total to career highs. Naslund finished the year with 48 goals and 104 points, again ranking him second in the league in points and goals. The fourth-highest point total in franchise history to that point in time. Bertuzzi recorded 46 goals and 97 points, his goal total ranked him third in the league in goal scoring. Morrison's 71 points remain a career high, which he has not gotten within 11 points of since. During the year, Naslund scored a career-high four goals in a 6–3 win over the Edmonton Oilers, tying a Canucks record for most goals in a single game. In the game, Bertuzzi added a goal and two assists while Morrison notched two assists of his own, giving the line nine points in the game. Later in the season the West Coast Express helped the Canucks go on a 14-game unbeaten streak, highlighted by back-to-back blowout wins to close out the streak. In the 13 game of the streak, a 7–2 win over the Columbus Blue Jackets, the line registered 5 goals and 12 points. The following game the trio increased their output to 5 goals and 14 points. In the contest, both Bertuzzi and Morrison registered two goals and two assists. Naslund scored a goal and added five assists for a career-high six-point night. The Canucks finished the season with 104 points, a franchise record at the time. The West Coast Express accounted for 45% of the Canucks' 264 goals during the season. Finishing fourth in the Western Conference, the Canucks faced the St. Louis Blues in the playoffs. They fell behind St. Louis 3–1 in the series, but rallied back to force a game seven. In the deciding game, Naslund scored for the fourth consecutive game in the series and Morrison added the eventual game winner as the Canucks advanced to the second round. Facing off against the Minnesota Wild in game one of round two, the Canucks trailed late in the game. With just 8.7 seconds remaining, Bertuzzi won a critical face-off before Naslund took a shot that resulted in Cooke scoring on the rebound to force overtime, where the Canucks eventually ran out 4–3 winners. Vancouver took a 3–1 series lead before the Wild rallied to tie the series and force a game seven. The Canucks took a 2–0 lead in the game after Bertuzzi scored twice in the second period. Following his second goal, Bertuzzi skated by the Wild bench and said "Get your golf clubs out, boys, its over." The Canucks then surrendered four consecutive goals, losing the game 4–2 and eliminating them from the playoffs. It was the last playoff game the trio would play together. In the off season Bertuzzi and Naslund were named to the NHL first All-Star team. Additionally Naslund was awarded the Lester B. Pearson Award (since renamed the Ted Lindsay Award), given to the league's best player as voted by the NHL Players' Association.

=== End of the Express ===
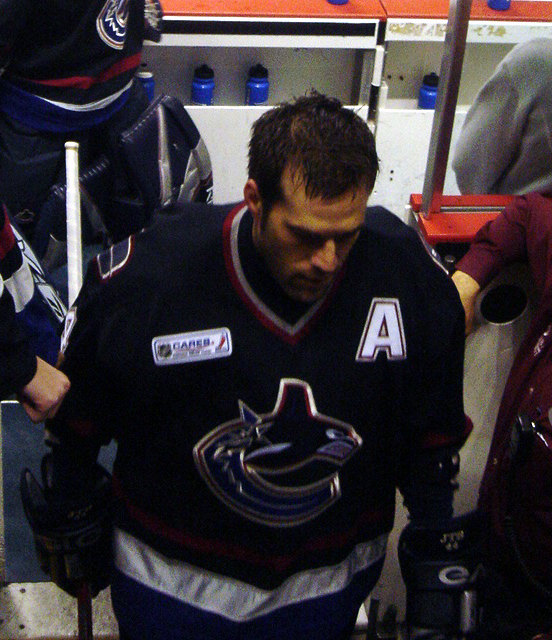
Bertuzzi was a part of the trade that brought goaltender Roberto Luongo to the Canucks.

The following season each member of the West Coast Express suffered a decline in performance. The trio were unable to complete the season as a unit due to injuries and suspension. On February 16, 2004, in a game against the Colorado Avalanche, Naslund received a "questionable hit" from the Avalanche's Steve Moore. Suffering a minor concussion from the hit and a hyper-extended elbow when he fell to the ice, he missed three games due to his injuries. While Moore was unpenalized for the hit, some Canucks players felt that it was a "cheap shot". In the second rematch of the two teams after Moore's hit on Naslund, Vancouver allegedly put a "bounty" on Moore and were out to make him "pay a price". Early in the game, Moore clashed with Cooke, but later refused to fight Bertuzzi, despite being taunted and followed around the ice. After being refused the fight, Bertuzzi punched Moore in the head from behind and slammed him into the ice. Bertuzzi was subsequently suspended indefinitely by the NHL, and the resulting injuries ended Moore's career and left him suffering from concussion symptoms over the following seven years. Despite the loss of Bertuzzi, the Canucks won the Northwest Division. In the opening round Vancouver faced their division rival Calgary Flames. In the series Vancouver fell behind three games to two. They took a 4–0 lead in game six before the Flames came back to tie the game and send it to overtime. The game remained tied into the third overtime when Morrison scored at the 2:28 mark to force game seven. In game seven the Canucks were again trailing late into the third period in the closing seconds Naslund went around Flames defenceman Jordan Leopold drove the net and put a shot on goal. Flames goaltender Miikka Kiprusoff, made the save but Cooke scored on the rebound with just 5.7 seconds remain to force overtime. The Canucks failed to capitalize on the change in momentum as the Flames' Martin Gelinas scored 1:25 into overtime eliminating Vancouver. Naslund recorded nine points in the seven-game series while Morrison chipped in five. During the off-season Naslund received the last of his individual NHL honors being named a First Team NHL All-Star once again.

Following the cancellation of the 2004–05 season due to a labor dispute, Bertuzzi was reinstated for the 2005–06 season. With the return of all three line mate and new rules designed to increase offensive chances the Canucks entered the year with high hopes. Despite this, Naslund and Morrison's point production again decreased from their last NHL season. Bertuzzi point total increased, however, he played in 13 more games than his previous season. The Canucks missed the playoffs for the first time in four years and the only time during the West Coast Express' tenure. During the off season, the line was officially dismantled when Bertuzzi was traded to the Florida Panthers, along with goaltender Alex Auld and defenceman Bryan Allen, in exchange for goaltender Roberto Luongo, defenceman Lukáš Krajíček and a sixth-round selection in the 2006 NHL entry draft (Sergei Shirokov). Both Naslund and Morrison played two more years with the Canucks, often together (but not always), before signing as free agents with the New York Rangers and the Anaheim Ducks respectively in the summer of 2008.

== Legacy ==
During its time, the West Coast Express was widely considered one of the most dominant line combinations in the league. The mid-nineties witnessed the increased popularity of defensive schemes like the neutral zone trap which slowed the game, limiting scoring and offensive chances. The emphasis on defensive has been blamed for diminishing fan interest. When Naslund was traded to Vancouver in 1996 the Canucks often played in a half empty arena and there were rumors about the franchise moving. The line's offense first style helped to popularize the franchise. They began to sell out home games on a regular basis and started to have a following on the road. In the 2002–03 season the Canucks 264 goals was the highest total for the franchise in nine years. It remained unsurpassed by another Canucks team until the 2009–10 team, which featured the NHL's leading scorer, Henrik Sedin. The franchise record for points they set that same season stood for only two seasons until it was surpassed in 2006–07 season. During which Roberto Luongo set a franchise record for goaltender wins with 47, a single season win total that is also tied for second most all-time in NHL history.

== Career statistics ==
=== Regular season ===
| | Markus Naslund | | | | | Brendan Morrison | | | | | Todd Bertuzzi | | | | | Combined Totals |
| Season | GP | G | A | Pts | PIM | GP | G | A | Pts | PIM | GP | G | A | Pts | PIM | GP | G | A | Pts | PIM |
|---|---|---|---|---|---|---|---|---|---|---|---|---|---|---|---|---|---|---|---|---|
| 2001–02 | 81 | 40 | 50 | 90 | 50 | 82 | 23 | 44 | 67 | 26 | 72 | 36 | 49 | 85 | 110 | 235 | 99 | 143 | 242 | 186 |
| 2002–03 | 82 | 48 | 56 | 104 | 52 | 82 | 25 | 46 | 71 | 36 | 82 | 46 | 51 | 97 | 144 | 246 | 119 | 153 | 272 | 230 |
| 2003–04 | 78 | 35 | 49 | 84 | 58 | 82 | 22 | 38 | 60 | 50 | 69 | 17 | 43 | 60 | 122 | 229 | 74 | 130 | 204 | 240 |
| 2005–06 | 81 | 32 | 47 | 79 | 66 | 82 | 19 | 37 | 56 | 84 | 82 | 25 | 46 | 71 | 120 | 245 | 76 | 130 | 206 | 270 |
| Totals | 322 | 155 | 202 | 357 | 226 | 328 | 89 | 167 | 254 | 196 | 305 | 124 | 189 | 313 | 496 | 955 | 368 | 558 | 926 | 926 |

=== Playoffs ===
| | Markus Naslund | | | | | Brendan Morrison | | | | | Todd Bertuzzi | | | | | Combined Totals |
| Season | GP | G | A | Pts | PIM | GP | G | A | Pts | PIM | GP | G | A | Pts | PIM | GP | G | A | Pts | PIM |
|---|---|---|---|---|---|---|---|---|---|---|---|---|---|---|---|---|---|---|---|---|
| 2001–02 | 6 | 1 | 1 | 2 | 2 | 6 | 0 | 2 | 2 | 6 | 6 | 2 | 2 | 4 | 14 | 18 | 3 | 5 | 8 | 22 |
| 2002–03 | 14 | 5 | 9 | 14 | 18 | 14 | 4 | 7 | 11 | 18 | 14 | 2 | 4 | 6 | 60 | 42 | 11 | 20 | 31 | 96 |
| 2003–04 | 7 | 2 | 7 | 9 | 2 | 7 | 2 | 3 | 5 | 8 | – | – | – | – | – | 14 | 4 | 10 | 14 | 10 |
| Totals | 27 | 8 | 17 | 25 | 22 | 27 | 6 | 12 | 18 | 32 | 20 | 4 | 6 | 10 | 74 | 74 | 18 | 35 | 53 | 128 |
