= Todd Bertuzzi–Steve Moore incident =

2004 National Hockey League player injury

Todd Bertuzzi - Steve Moore incident
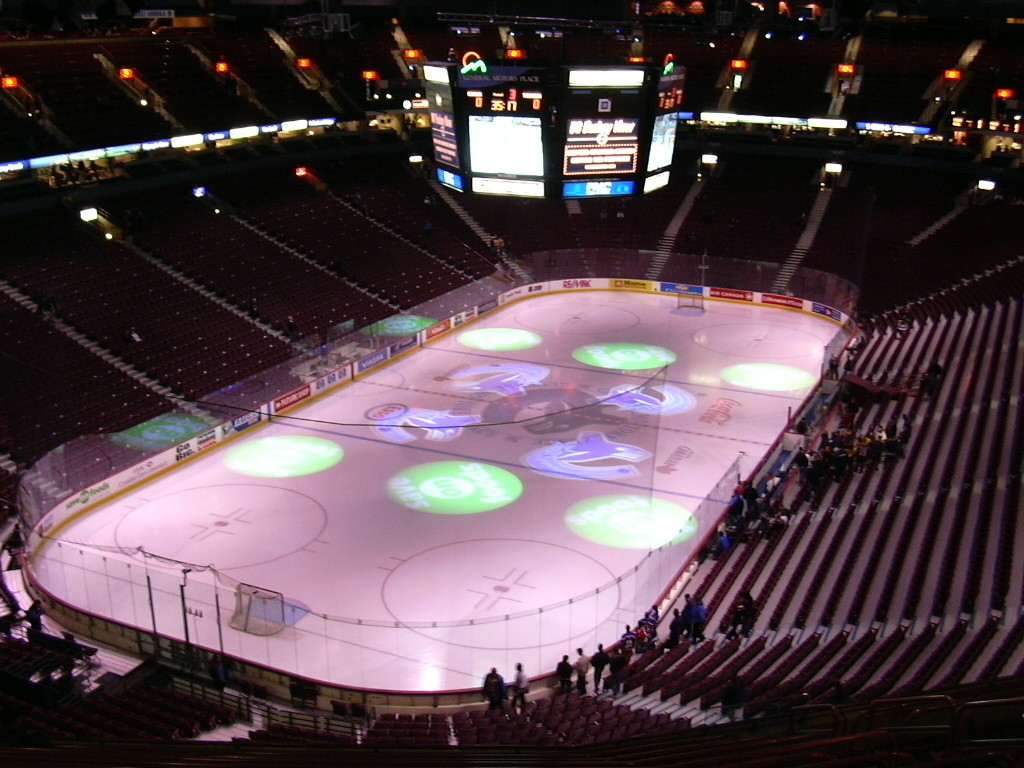
- Rogers Arena, then called General Motors Place (pictured in 2003), where the incident took place
	1	2	3	Total
Colorado Avalanche	5	1	3	9
Vancouver Canucks	0	2	0	2
- Date: March 8, 2004
- Arena: Rogers Arena
- City: Vancouver
- Attendance: 18,630

The Todd Bertuzzi–Steve Moore incident (also called the Bertuzzi–Moore incident) happened during a National Hockey League (NHL) game between the Vancouver Canucks and the Colorado Avalanche at Vancouver's Rogers Arena (then-called General Motors Place) on March 8, 2004.

In the first period, Avalanche forward Peter Worrell fought Canucks forward Brad May. After major penalties were accessed, Colorado forward Steve Moore fought Canucks forward Matt Cooke off the faceoff, resulting in two more major penalties for both teams. After Canucks goaltender Dan Cloutier allowed 4 goals on 10 shots, coach Marc Crawford was prompted to replace him with backup goaltender Johan Hedberg. Steve Moore scored one more goal for Colorado in the first, giving them a 5–0 lead. Brad May would score twice for Vancouver in the second period, cutting the deficit to three goals. Colorado would answer with a power-play goal from Derek Morris four minutes later, giving them a 6–2 lead. Late in the third period, Todd Bertuzzi was sent onto the ice for Vancouver. After failing to instigate Moore to fight, Bertuzzi skated after Moore, grabbed his jersey and punched him in the right side of the head, knocking him unconscious. Bertuzzi landed on top of him, driving Moore's face first into the ice, and Moore's teammate Andrei Nikolishin and Bertuzzi's teammate Sean Pronger piled onto them. Moore was knocked out and laid motionless for ten minutes before being carried off on a stretcher. The combination of the hit, fall, and piling-on had resulted in three fractured neck vertebrae, facial cuts and a concussion. The incident ended Moore's professional hockey career, and resulted in criminal assault charges against Bertuzzi, and a civil lawsuit against Bertuzzi and the Canucks. The Avalanche would go on to win the game 9–2, with Milan Hejduk recording a hat trick and Joe Sakic recording 4 points.

On August 19, 2014, it was reported the lawsuit ended with all parties agreeing to a confidential settlement.

== Game summary ==
March 8, 2004	Vancouver Canucks	2–9	Colorado Avalanche	General Motors Place	Recap

Scoring summary
Period	Team	Goal	Assist(s)	Time	Score
1st	COL	Milan Hejduk (33)	Joe Sakic (46)	06:54	1–0 COL
1st	COL	Steve Konowalchuk (16)	Dan Hinote (5) and Riku Hahl (1)	14:40	2–0 COL
1st	COL	Joe Sakic (30)	Unassisted	15:09	3–0 COL
1st	COL	Darby Hendrickson (2)	Derek Morris (22)	15:31	4–0 COL
1st	COL	Steve Moore (2)	Peter Worrell (1)	16:19	5–0 COL
2nd	VAN	Brad May (4)	Matt Cooke (6) and Trevor Linden (18)	07:24	5–1 COL
2nd	VAN	Brad May (5)	Brent Sopel (29) and Trevor Linden (19)	08:16	5–2 COL
2nd	COL	Derek Morris (6) – pp	Joe Sakic (47) and Paul Kariya (17)	12:16	6–2 COL
3rd	COL	Paul Kariya (9) – sh	Unassisted	01:09	7–2 COL
3rd	COL	Milan Hejduk (34) – pp	Joe Sakic (48) and Karlis Skrastins (7)	03:16	8–2 COL
3rd	COL	Milan Hejduk (35) – pp	Alex Tanguay (53) and John-Michael Liles (20)	11:59	9–2 COL
Penalty summary
Period	Team	Player	Penalty	Time	PIM
1st	COL	Peter Worrell	Fighting – major	06:33	5:00
1st	VAN	Brad May	Fighting – major	06:33	5:00
1st	COL	Steve Moore	Fighting – major	06:36	5:00
1st	VAN	Matt Cooke	Fighting – major	06:36	5:00
1st	VAN	Todd Bertuzzi	Interference	10:08	2:00
1st	COL	Rob Blake	Fighting – major	17:42	5:00
1st	VAN	Jarkko Ruutu	Fighting – major	17:42	5:00
1st	COL	Peter Worrell	Fighting – major	18:03	5:00
1st	VAN	Brad May	Fighting – major	18:03	5:00
1st	VAN	Tyler Bouck	High-sticking	18:45	2:00
1st	VAN	Johan Hedberg	Delay of game	19:33	2:00
2nd	VAN	Brady May	Misconduct	08:16	10:00
2nd	VAN	Jarkko Ruutu	Interference	08:43	2:00
2nd	VAN	Matt Cooke	Goaltender interference	10:51	2:00
2nd	VAN	Johan Hedberg	Delay of game	11:07	2:00
2nd	COL	Steve Konowalchuk	Interference	12:33	2:00
2nd	COL	Bench (served by Teemu Selanne)	Too many men on the ice	18:39	2:00
3rd	COL	Andrei Nikolishin	Tripping	00:36	2:00
3rd	VAN	Brad May	Roughing	02:20	2:00
3rd	VAN	Wade Brookbank	Roughing	05:19	5:00
3rd	COL	Kurt Sauer	Fighting – major	08:41	5:00
3rd	COL	Kurt Sauer	Game misconduct	08:41	10:00
3rd	VAN	Brad May	Fighting – major	08:41	5:00
3rd	VAN	Brad May	Double game misconduct	08:41	20:00
3rd	VAN	Todd Bertuzzi	Attempt to injure	08:41	10:00
3rd	VAN	Johan Hedberg	Leaving the crease	08:41	2:00
3rd	VAN	Wade Brookbank	Holding	11:20	2:00
3rd	VAN	Wade Brookbank	Roughing	11:20	2:00
3rd	COL	Peter Worrell	Spearing – double minor	17:24	4:00
3rd	COL	Peter Worrell	Unsportsmanlike conduct	17:24	2:00
3rd	COL	Peter Worrell	Misconduct	17:24	10:00
3rd	VAN	Wade Brookbank	Roughing	17:24	2:00
3rd	VAN	Wade Brookbank	Misconduct	17:24	10:00

Shots by period
Team	1	2	3	Total
Colorado	14	12	9	35
Vancouver	4	9	5	18

Power play opportunities
Team	Goals/Opportunities
Colorado	3/12
Vancouver	0/5

Three star selections
	Team	Player	Statistics
1st	COL	Milan Hejduk	3 goals
2nd	COL	Joe Sakic	1 goal, 3 assists
3rd	VAN	Brad May	2 goals

== Background and prelude ==
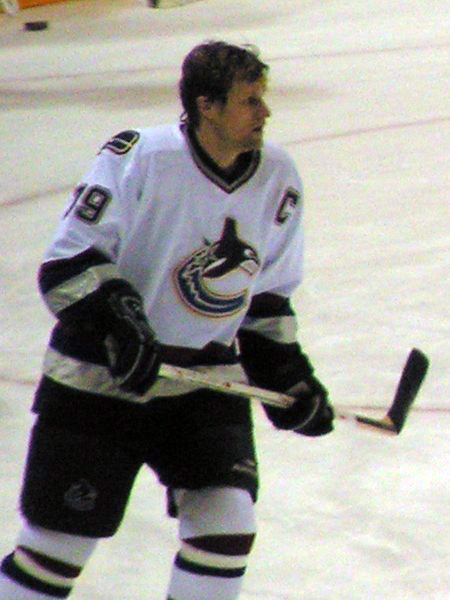
Markus Näslund, pictured almost two months after the incident.

On February 16, 2004, during a game between Vancouver and Colorado, Avalanche center Steve Moore injured Canucks team captain Markus Näslund by hitting him hard in the head while Näslund was reaching for the puck ahead of him. Näslund, the league's leading scorer at the time, suffered a minor concussion and a bone chip in his elbow, knocking him out of the lineup for three games. Referee Dan Marouelli did not call a penalty, ruling the hit legal, a judgment shared by the league upon further review after the game.

Canucks head coach Marc Crawford publicly criticized the no-infraction call, claiming that Marouelli and his partner, Rob Martell, needed to show "respect" for the league's leading scorer. Vancouver president and general manager Brian Burke, the league's former chief disciplinarian, described the play as "a marginal player going after a superstar with a headhunting hit". Several Canucks players were also vocal against Moore in the media. In particular, forward Brad May issued a "bounty" on Moore, while Bertuzzi called him a "piece of s**t." Näslund missed three games as a result of the hit and returned in time for the next game between the Canucks and Avalanche on March 3. With NHL commissioner Gary Bettman in attendance, the contest was played to a 5–5 tie without incident.

== The incident ==
In a rematch five days later, the Canucks were more active in physically pursuing Moore. In one of four fights in the first period, Canucks forward Matt Cooke fought Moore six minutes into the game. At the first intermission, with the score already 5–0 for Colorado, NHL executive vice-president Colin Campbell and director of officiating Andy Van Hellemond placed a phone call to the two referees overseeing the game to discuss the potential for an escalation in physicality. With Colorado leading 8–2 midway through the third period, Bertuzzi began following Moore around the ice, attempting to provoke him into another fight. With Moore ignoring him, Bertuzzi grabbed Moore's jersey from behind and punched him in the back of the jaw, rendering Moore immediately unconscious. Moore's head hit the ice with Bertuzzi falling on top of his body. Several other players from both teams jumped atop Moore after he fell to the ice. A line brawl erupted, involving all remaining skaters except for the goaltenders on the ice. Canucks fans initially cheered at Bertuzzi's actions believing that Moore had it coming for what happened two games before, but as the fighting died down and it became apparent that Moore was seriously injured, the arena became silent.

After lying on the ice for approximately 10 minutes, Moore was removed from the playing surface on a stretcher. With eight minutes remaining in the third period and the outcome effectively decided, Avalanche general manager Pierre Lacroix reportedly asked referees to end the game. The contest was nonetheless played out with the Avalanche winning 9–2. Moore was taken to Vancouver General Hospital and later transferred to a Denver hospital, where he was treated for three fractured vertebrae in his neck, a grade-three concussion, vertebral ligament damage, stretching of the brachial plexus nerves, and facial lacerations. He was also suffering from amnesia.

Two days after the incident, Bertuzzi scheduled a press conference in which he wept and apologized to Moore and his family, as well as to Burke, Canucks owner John McCaw, Jr., the Canucks organization, his teammates, and the fans. He added, "For the kids that watch this game, I'm truly sorry. I don't play the game that way. And I'm not a mean-spirited person."

== Reactions and disciplinary actions ==
=== NHL ===
Bertuzzi was assessed a match penalty and ejected from the game. Per league rules, he was also suspended indefinitely pending a ruling from Bettman. On the morning of his apology, he attended a disciplinary hearing with NHL officials in Toronto, along with his agent, Pat Morris, and Brian Burke. The following day, on March 11, 2004, the league ruled he would remain suspended for at least the remainder of the Canucks' season, which ultimately cost him the final 13 games of the regular season plus seven playoff games. The Canucks were additionally fined $250,000. While the following NHL season was suspended due to the 2004–05 lockout, many players went overseas to play in Europe. Upon learning that Bertuzzi was intending to do the same, the International Ice Hockey Federation (IIHF) extended his NHL suspension to cover their jurisdiction. He did, however, participate with other NHL players in a December 2004 charity game, held in Vancouver. The game was organized by Brad May in partnership with the Vancouver Giants, a junior club in the Western Hockey League (WHL), and raised funds for Canuck Place, a Vancouver children's hospice sponsored by the Canucks. Bertuzzi received a standing ovation from the sellout crowd.

Though the NHL lockout had not yet been resolved between the league and the players, Bettman scheduled a reinstatement hearing for Bertuzzi on April 26, 2005. The hearing was attended separately by Bertuzzi and Moore. After the lockout officially ended and the NHL was set to resume play for the 2005–06 season, Bettman announced Bertuzzi's reinstatement on August 8, citing that "Mr. Bertuzzi ha[d] paid a very significant price for his conduct," adding that he felt Bertuzzi was "genuinely remorseful and apologetic." Bertuzzi's 17-month suspension caused him to miss a total of 20 games—the fourth-longest suspension in NHL history at the time. The suspension accounted for $501,926.39 in forfeited salary, as well as an approximate $350,000 in lost endorsements. Bettman also cited "uncertainty, anxiety, stress and emotional pain for the Bertuzzi family" resulting from the suspension as a reason for his reinstatement.

=== IIHF ===
Releasing a statement on December 17, 2004, the IIHF described Bertuzzi's actions as "an extremely serious violation of the rules" which put "the sport into disrepute." The decision was based on an IIHF statute which allows it to ban any player from playing internationally if he has been deemed "detrimental to the best interest" of hockey. Suspended by both the NHL and IIHF, Bertuzzi remained professionally inactive during the 2004–05 season. The IIHF's sanction also kept him from representing Canada in the 2004 and 2005 World Championships, as well as the 2004 World Cup.

On the day of his reinstatement, Team Canada's executive director, Wayne Gretzky, offered Bertuzzi a spot on the national team's summer orientation camp in preparation for the 2006 Winter Olympics. A week later, Bertuzzi broke his 17-month-long public silence by again admitting to his mistake and expressing a desire to move on with his life. He stated, "I'm sure just like Steve Moore and his family, it's been difficult for both parties. I know I wish that day never happened. It's been some tough times, but I've got good family and good friends and good peers in the league that have helped me get over the hump and move forward and come through it."

== Legal action and lawsuits ==
=== Original 2005 – 2008 lawsuit ===
Beyond his NHL and IIHF suspensions, legal action was taken against Bertuzzi in the provincial courts of British Columbia and Ontario, as well as in Colorado state court. After a four-month investigation, the criminal justice branch of the Attorney General of British Columbia announced on June 24, 2004, he was being formally charged with assault causing bodily harm. With the charge, Bertuzzi faced up to one-and-a-half years in prison. Several months later, on December 22, Bertuzzi pleaded guilty to the assault charge after arranging a plea bargain with prosecutors. He was given a conditional discharge requiring 80 hours of community service and one year's probation that additionally prohibited him from playing in any hockey game Moore was competing in. Under Canadian law, Bertuzzi's successful completion of his probationary period precluded him from having a criminal record. Moore expressed disappointment regarding Bertuzzi's discharge and was upset that he was unable to attend the court date, having to issue a written victim statement instead. Moore's lawyer, Tim Danson, was given one day's notice of the court date following Bertuzzi's plea bargain, which he said was insufficient time for Moore to travel to Vancouver.

On February 17, 2005, Moore filed a lawsuit in a Colorado court against Bertuzzi. Also named in the lawsuit were numerous individuals within the Canucks organization, including Brad May (Bertuzzi's teammate at the time who was quoted as saying that there would "definitely be a price on Moore's head" after Moore's hit on Näslund), Brian Burke, Marc Crawford, as well as the Canucks organization as a whole and the Orca Bay Sports and Entertainment company that owned the team. The lawsuit was thrown out in October 2005, as the Colorado judge ruled the case was better suited for Canadian courts, as Moore and all the defendants were Canadian citizens. Planning to appeal the decision, Danson stated publicly the following month that Moore had begun skating and doing regular workouts, but continued to suffer concussion-related symptoms.

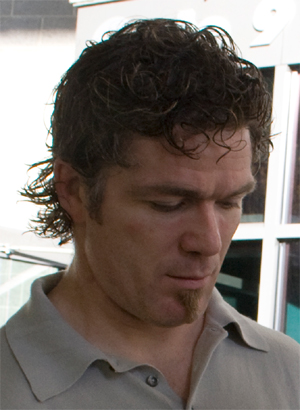
Brad May was brought into the case due to his threat that "they put a bounty on him (Moore)".

On February 16, 2006, the day of Bertuzzi's first Olympic game with Team Canada, Moore filed another lawsuit in the Ontario Superior Court against Bertuzzi, the Canucks, and Orca Bay, seeking CAD$15 million in pecuniary damages for loss of income, CAD$1 million for aggravated damages, and CAD$2 million for punitive damages. Moore's parents, who were watching their son on television when the attack happened, also sued, seeking CAD$1.5 million for "negligent infliction of nervous shock and mental distress". Moore's lawyer filed the suit one day before its two-year limitation expired, denying there was any connection between the timing and Bertuzzi's participation in the 2006 Winter Olympics.

In December 2006, NHL commissioner Gary Bettman and top lieutenant Bill Daly facilitated a meeting between Moore's representatives and the defendants in hopes of agreeing on an out-of-court settlement. As court proceedings continued into the next year, Danson misfiled a confidential letter to Bertuzzi's lawyer, Geoffrey Adair, as a public document. The letter revealed that in July 2006, Adair asked Danson in a meeting whether Moore would accept a CAD$1 million settlement; Danson indicated that the figure was insufficient. The letter also revealed that Bertuzzi and Orca Bay subsequently offered a joint settlement of CAD$350,000 in the December 2006 meeting with Bettman several months later, an amount Danson described as insulting.

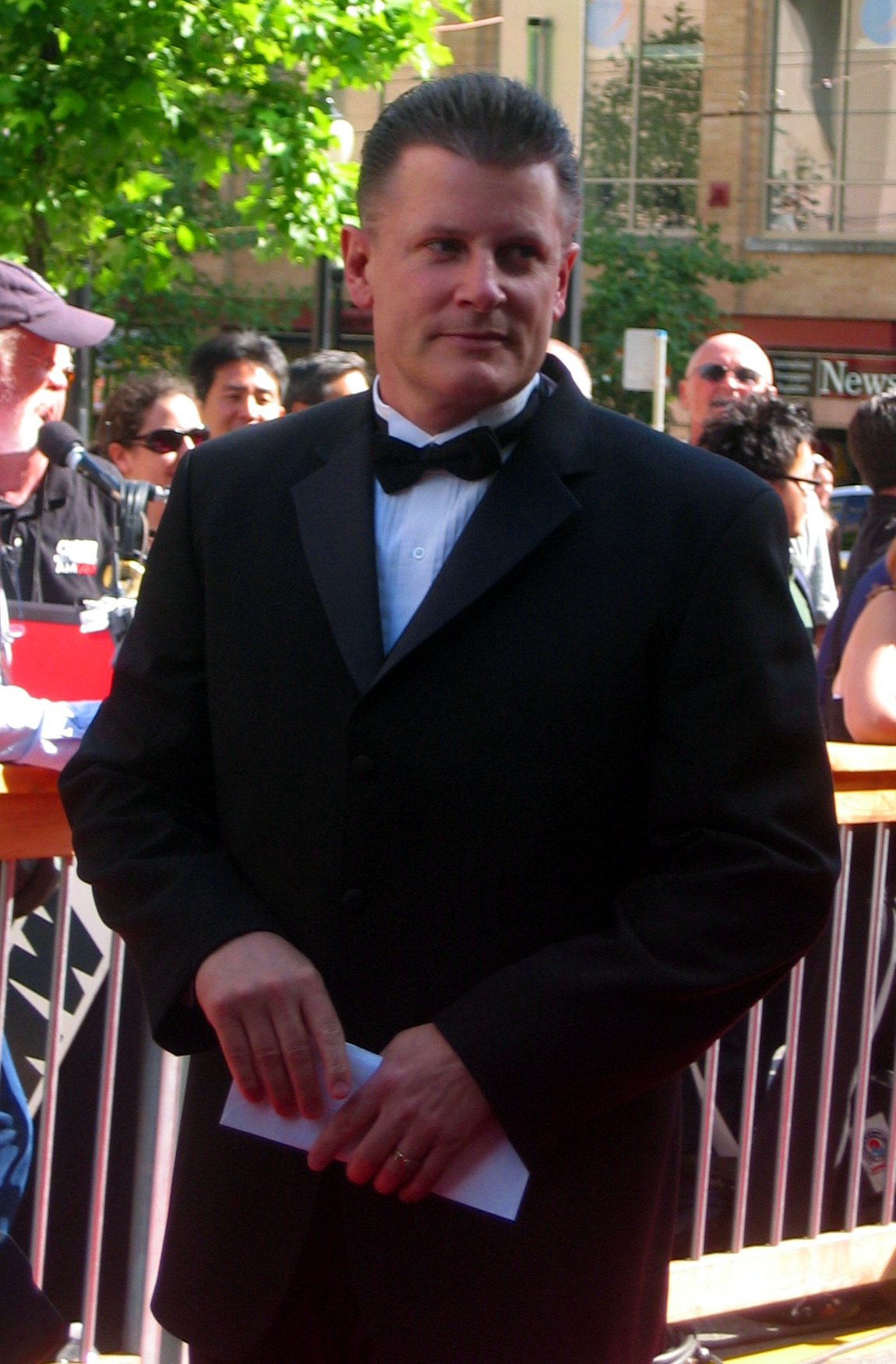
Marc Crawford was brought into the case because Bertuzzi claimed that he told players during the second intermission that Moore needed to "pay the price".

During the lawsuit's discovery process, Danson asked the Ontario judge to void the formal transfer of Bertuzzi's CAD$1.2 million home in Kitchener, Ontario, to his wife, which occurred five weeks after his actions against Moore. It was argued that the transfer was intended to "make Bertuzzi creditor-proof to the greatest extent possible." Meanwhile, Adair expressed his concern regarding the leaked letter between him and Danson impairing the possibility of a fair trial. In December 2007, Moore further amended the lawsuit, seeking an increased CAD$35 million for loss of income and CAD$3.5 million for the suffering of his parents.

That same month, the Ontario Superior Court released statements pertaining to the lawsuit in which Bertuzzi testified that Crawford was to blame for his actions against Moore, an allegation corroborated by new Canucks general manager Dave Nonis, who was then director of hockey operations for the club. Bertuzzi claimed that Crawford told players during the second intermission of the March 8 game that Moore needed to "pay the price" for his earlier hit against Näslund. Statements filed from Danson further claimed that Crawford had pointed to Moore's name and number on a board in the Canucks' dressing room during the intermission, calling for the players to take action. The Canucks formally denied both parties' claims, saying "At no time did the Vancouver Canucks organization or any of its management and employees, including former coach Mr. Crawford, encourage or promote the incident that occurred between Todd Bertuzzi and Steve Moore."

In lieu of the allegations against Crawford, Bertuzzi filed a third-party complaint against his former coach on March 3, 2008. He alleged that he was contractually obliged to obey Crawford and that the coach should be held personally liable for any legal damages Moore might be awarded in court. In response, Crawford formally stated that Bertuzzi acted in "direct disobedience" to orders from the bench to get off the ice before attacking Moore. The suit was settled between the two in July 2011, though details regarding the agreement were kept undisclosed to Danson and Moore. The following year, a court decision required the settlement details to be revealed as part of the Moore-Bertuzzi trial.

=== 2011 lawsuit ===
Five years after filing the Ontario suit, Danson told reporters in March 2011 that in order to fully gauge the extent of Moore's injury, the case had not yet proceeded. At the time, he was not yet employed and still experiencing headaches. After several delays, in October 2013 it was announced that the court date for the trial between Steve Moore and the Canucks/Bertuzzi will be September 8, 2014. On July 2, 2014, during Steve Moore's first appearance at his civil trial, he further amended the lawsuit, seeking CAD$68 million in damages, up from CAD$38 million. On August 19, 2014, it was announced that an out-of-court settlement had been reached in Steve Moore's lawsuit. Terms of the settlement are confidential.

== Aftermath ==
On August 8, 2005, NHL commissioner Gary Bettman announced that Bertuzzi would be allowed to play again at the start of the 2005–06 NHL season. In the league's decision, he cited many reasons for ending the suspension, such as:

- Bertuzzi's serving a suspension of 20 games, which at the time tied for fourth-longest in NHL history (13 regular season games, seven playoff games)
- Bertuzzi's repeated attempts to apologize to Moore personally
- Bertuzzi's forfeited salary (about $501,926)
- Lost endorsements (approximately $350,000)
- Significant uncertainty, anxiety, stress and emotional pain caused to Bertuzzi's family
- The commissioner's belief that Bertuzzi was genuinely remorseful and apologetic for his actions

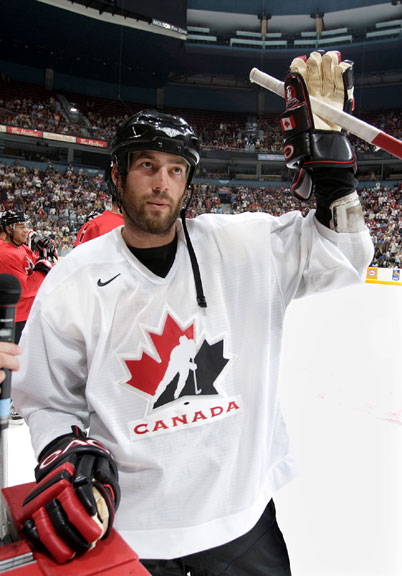
Bertuzzi with Team Canada in 2005.

On August 12, 2005, Brian Burke, formerly Vancouver's general manager who was now serving in the same capacity with the Anaheim Ducks, had made an offer to Moore. It was a two-way contract that would have paid Moore $475,000 US in the NHL and $75,000 if the player suited up for the Portland Pirates, the Ducks' American Hockey League affiliate. Moore's lawyer Tim Danson objected that Moore was considered a minor league player by Burke. Danson also described the offer as a self-serving attempt to mitigate potential legal damages, saying that Moore was not medically cleared to play hockey and describing it as adding insult to injury.

Bertuzzi was inactive in 2004–05 due to the lockout and his ongoing suspension, which had been extended internationally. Bertuzzi returned to the Canucks in 2005–06, as the league ended his playing ban. He recorded 25 goals and 71 points, including two hat tricks (November 13, 2005, against the Detroit Red Wings and January 14, 2006, against the New York Islanders). Though he ranked third in team scoring, Crawford has recalled that by the end of the season, Näslund and Bertuzzi had been eclipsed by Daniel and Henrik Sedin as the team's offensive leaders. Moore continued working out for several years afterward, but ultimately abandoned his comeback efforts when it became apparent he would never be medically cleared to play again.

There was speculation that the effects of the Steve Moore incident were negatively affecting Bertuzzi's play. While on the road, he was consistently heckled and booed by fans throughout the NHL. Näslund, a close friend of Bertuzzi's, later expressed sympathy for him, saying in a 2008 interview, "It still bothers me what Todd has had to go through ... There's no question he was standing up for me ... it all went too far."

Beyond the negative impact on Bertuzzi's individual play, the media speculated that the fallout from the Moore incident had become a distraction to the organization as a whole. Compounding the situation in Vancouver, the Canucks had missed the playoffs for the first time in four years. As such, general manager Dave Nonis spent the off-season making significant changes to the Canucks lineup. On June 23, 2006, he traded Bertuzzi to the Florida Panthers, along with goaltender Alex Auld and defenceman Bryan Allen, in exchange for goaltender Roberto Luongo, defenceman Lukáš Krajíček and a sixth-round selection in the 2006 NHL entry draft (Sergei Shirokov). After seven-and-a-half seasons with the Canucks, Bertuzzi left the club ranked seventh all-time among franchise scoring leaders with 449 points.

== See also ==
- Richard Riot
- Donald Brashear - Marty McSorley incident
- Violence in ice hockey
- Malice at the Palace, similar event occurred eight months later during NHL lockout after this incident
