= Scott Parker (ice hockey) =

American ice hockey player (born 1978)

- Born: January 29, 1978 (age 48) Hanford, California, U.S.
- Height: 6 ft 5 in (196 cm)
- Weight: 240 lb (109 kg; 17 st 2 lb)
- Position: Right Wing
- Shot: Right
- Played for: Colorado Avalanche; San Jose Sharks
- NHL draft: 63rd overall, 1996; New Jersey Devils; 20th overall, 1998; Colorado Avalanche
- Playing career: 1998–2008

Scott Douglas Parker (born January 29, 1978) is an American former professional ice hockey right winger who played for the Colorado Avalanche and San Jose Sharks in the NHL. Parker earned his nickname, "the Sheriff", from his reputation as a feared fighter and enforcer.

== Playing career ==
Parker grew up playing ice hockey in Eagle River, Alaska, with the youth hockey Mustang Hockey Association and Alaska All Star Hockey Association. He played high school hockey for the Chugiak High School Mustangs. In his sophomore year with the Mustangs Parker was a member of the varsity hockey team that won the Alaska state high school hockey championship. Parker played a season of Junior "B" hockey for the Spokane Braves and then went on to play for the Kelowna Rockets of the Major Junior Western Hockey League of the Canadian Hockey League. It was with the Rockets that Parker was drafted into the NHL.

He was initially drafted by the New Jersey Devils in the third round, 63rd overall, in the 1996 NHL entry draft. However unable to come to an agreement with the Devils he re-entered into the 1998 draft and was selected in the first round, 20th overall, by the Colorado Avalanche. After playing a few seasons in the WHL with the Kelowna Rockets, Parker started his NHL career with the Avalanche in 1998 and was a member of their 2001 Stanley Cup championship team.

Parker was acquired by San Jose for a fifth round selection in the 2003 NHL entry draft on June 21, 2003. In 2005, Parker was struck in the head by the puck, and spent a long time off the ice recovering from the resulting concussion.

In a game against the Nashville Predators on March 11, 2006, Parker got involved in an altercation with Nashville defenceman Brendan Witt. Called for elbowing Nashville player Jordin Tootoo, Parker was ejected from the game after an outburst of emotion in the penalty box, including slamming his stick against the glass. As he was led off the ice, Parker jumped onto the glass between the two teams' benches and struck Witt several times. As a result, he was suspended for two games.

On February 27, 2007, Parker was re-acquired by the Colorado Avalanche from the Sharks for a sixth round draft pick in the 2008 draft.

On October 17, 2008, Parker was assigned to Colorado's affiliate the Lake Erie Monsters of the AHL. In a rare conflict between the team and one of its own players, the Avalanche terminated Parker's contract on November 9, 2008 for insubordination for not reporting to the Monsters.

== Personal ==
Parker was born in Hanford, California and raised in Eagle River, Alaska.

Parker retired in early August 2009 and has since started a barbershop business with his wife Francesca in Castle Rock, Colorado.

In 2006, Parker and his wife Francesca started a charity called "Parker's Platoon". Parker's Platoon is dedicated to helping military veterans transition from military to civilian life. They help "one veteran at a time" through activities such as riding snow machines in the Rockies to trout fishing and other activities that bring veterans together, helping the vets realize they are not alone in their mental and physical healing process.

In July, 2012, Parker made some controversial comments about Steve Moore. Parker was on the roster of the San Jose Sharks at the time of the 2004 Todd Bertuzzi - Steve Moore incident in which Moore's career was ended by an on-ice attack from Todd Bertuzzi, but Parker and Moore had been teammates in Colorado during prior seasons. In an interview with milehighhockey.com, Parker defended Bertuzzi and spoke disparagingly of Moore, being quoted as saying "he (Moore) always thought he was better than everybody else.”

In 2017, Parker appeared on ESPN's Outside the Lines acknowledging that he was diagnosed with a traumatic brain injury.

== Career statistics ==
			Regular season					Playoffs
Season	Team	League	GP	G	A	Pts	PIM	GP	G	A	Pts	PIM
1994–95	Spokane Braves	KIJHL	43	7	21	28	128	—	—	—	—	—
1995–96	Kelowna Rockets	WHL	64	3	4	7	159	6	0	0	0	12
1996–97	Kelowna Rockets	WHL	68	18	8	26	330	6	0	2	2	4
1997–98	Kelowna Rockets	WHL	71	30	22	52	243	7	6	0	6	23
1998–99	Colorado Avalanche	NHL	27	0	0	0	71	—	—	—	—	—
1998–99	Hershey Bears	AHL	32	4	3	7	143	4	0	0	0	6
1999–2000	Hershey Bears	AHL	68	12	7	19	206	11	1	1	2	56
2000–01	Colorado Avalanche	NHL	69	2	3	5	155	4	0	0	0	2
2001–02	Colorado Avalanche	NHL	63	1	4	5	154	—	—	—	—	—
2002–03	Colorado Avalanche	NHL	43	1	3	4	82	1	0	0	0	2
2003–04	San Jose Sharks	NHL	50	1	3	4	101	—	—	—	—	—
2005–06	San Jose Sharks	NHL	10	1	0	1	38	—	—	—	—	—
2006–07	San Jose Sharks	NHL	11	0	0	0	22	—	—	—	—	—
2006–07	Colorado Avalanche	NHL	10	1	1	2	6	—	—	—	—	—
2007–08	Colorado Avalanche	NHL	25	0	0	0	70	—	—	—	—	—
NHL totals			308	7	14	21	699	5	0	0	0	4

== Awards and honors ==
Award	Year	Ref
NHL
Stanley Cup champion	2001	

Awards and achievements
Preceded by Robyn Regehr	Colorado Avalanche first-round draft pick 1998	Succeeded by Mikhail Kuleshov
