= Colin Campbell (ice hockey, born 1953) =

Canadian ice hockey player, executive (born 1953)

- Hockey Hall of Fame, 2024 (Builder)
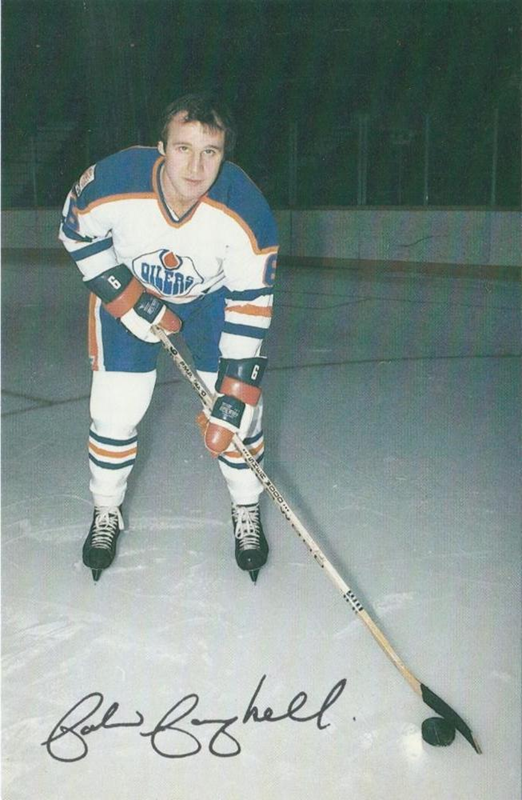
- Campbell in 1979 postcard
- Born: January 28, 1953 (age 73) Tillsonburg, Ontario, Canada
- Height: 5 ft 9 in (175 cm)
- Weight: 190 lb (86 kg; 13 st 8 lb)
- Position: Defence
- Shot: Left
- Played for: Vancouver Blazers; Pittsburgh Penguins; Colorado Rockies; Edmonton Oilers; Vancouver Canucks; Detroit Red Wings
- Coached for: New York Rangers
- NHL draft: 27th overall, 1973; Pittsburgh Penguins
- WHA draft: 5th overall, 1973; Vancouver Blazers
- Playing career: 1973–1985
- Coaching career: 1985–1998

Colin John Campbell (born January 28, 1953) is a Canadian former professional ice hockey defenceman, coach and current executive vice president and director of hockey operations of the National Hockey League (NHL). He played in the 1982 Stanley Cup Finals as a member of the losing Vancouver Canucks. Campbell was inducted into the Hockey Hall of Fame in 2024 as part of the Builder category.

== Playing career ==
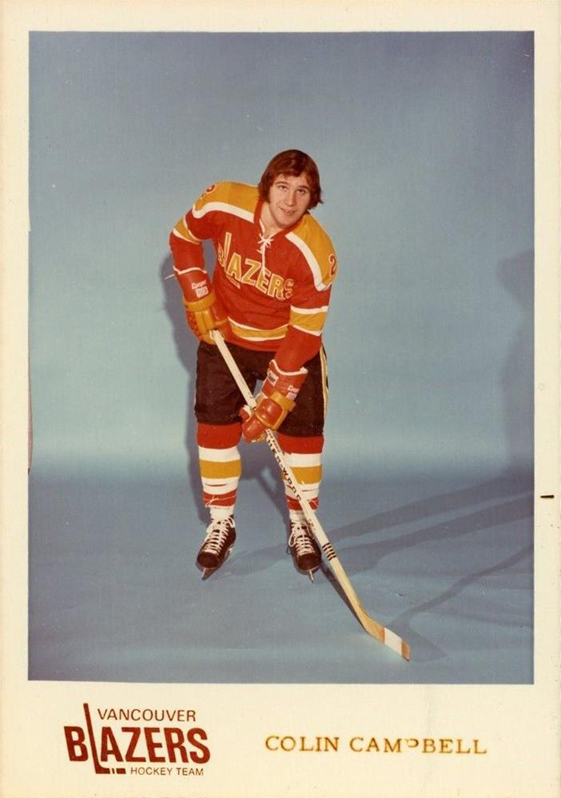
1973-74 photo of Campbell with Vancouver Blazers

Campbell spent his junior career with the Peterborough Petes of the Ontario Hockey Association (later the Ontario Hockey League). He was taken in the second round of the 1973 NHL Amateur Draft, 27th overall by the Pittsburgh Penguins, and also in the first round of the 1973 WHA Amateur Draft, 5th overall, by the Vancouver Blazers. After one season with the Blazers, Campbell signed on with Pittsburgh.

Campbell went on to play for the Penguins, Edmonton Oilers, Vancouver Canucks, and Detroit Red Wings. A scrappy, physical defender, Campbell scored just 25 goals in 11 NHL seasons while accumulating almost 1,300 penalty minutes.

In his 11-year NHL career, Campbell appeared in 636 NHL games, posting 25 goals and 103 assists for 128 points, along with 1292 penalty minutes. He also played 78 games in the WHA, recording 3 goals and 23 points along with 191 PIM.

== Career statistics ==
			Regular season					Playoffs
Season	Team	League	GP	G	A	Pts	PIM	GP	G	A	Pts	PIM
1970–71	Peterborough Petes	OHA-Jr.	59	5	18	23	160	5	0	2	2	22
1971–72	Peterborough Petes	OHA-Jr.	50	2	23	25	158	15	2	9	11	59
1971–72	Peterborough Petes	MC	—	—	—	—	—	3	0	2	2	6
1972–73	Peterborough Petes	OHA-Jr.	60	7	40	47	189	—	—	—	—	—
1973–74	Vancouver Blazers	WHA	78	3	20	23	191	—	—	—	—	—
1974–75	Pittsburgh Penguins	NHL	59	4	15	19	172	9	1	3	4	21
1974–75	Hershey Bears	AHL	15	1	3	4	55	—	—	—	—	—
1975–76	Pittsburgh Penguins	NHL	64	7	10	17	105	3	0	0	0	0
1976–77	Colorado Rockies	NHL	54	3	8	11	67	—	—	—	—	—
1976–77	Oklahoma City Blazers	CHL	7	1	2	3	9	—	—	—	—	—
1977–78	Pittsburgh Penguins	NHL	55	1	9	10	103	—	—	—	—	—
1978–79	Pittsburgh Penguins	NHL	65	2	18	20	137	7	1	4	5	30
1979–80	Edmonton Oilers	NHL	72	2	11	13	196	3	0	0	0	11
1980–81	Vancouver Canucks	NHL	42	1	8	9	75	3	0	1	1	9
1981–82	Vancouver Canucks	NHL	47	0	8	8	131	16	2	2	4	89
1982–83	Detroit Red Wings	NHL	53	1	7	8	74	—	—	—	—	—
1983–84	Detroit Red Wings	NHL	68	3	4	7	108	4	0	0	0	21
1984–85	Detroit Red Wings	NHL	57	1	5	6	124	—	—	—	—	—
WHA totals			78	3	20	23	191	—	—	—	—	—
NHL totals			636	25	103	128	1292	45	4	10	14	181

== Coaching career ==
Immediately following his retirement in 1985, Campbell joined the Red Wings coaching staff under head coach Jacques Demers. During the 1988 Stanley Cup Playoffs, Campbell and assistant general manager Neil Smith discovered several Red Wings players, including Bob Probert and Petr Klima, out past curfew. The incident occurred at a suburban Edmonton bar called "Goose Loonies", and led to an apology being issued by Demers. Campbell left the Red Wings after the dismissal of Demers in 1990.

Campbell then joined the New York Rangers as an associate coach for 1991–92, parts of 1992–93, and 1993–94. He was the head coach for the Rangers' top affiliate; the Binghamton Rangers of the American Hockey League for half of the 1992–93 season.

After head coach Mike Keenan left the Rangers after their Stanley Cup win in 1994, Campbell was promoted to take over for him.

In the strike-shortened NHL season that followed, Campbell led the Rangers to a fourth-place finish in the Atlantic Division. That was good enough to get the Rangers into the playoffs as the 8th and lowest seed, where they faced the Eastern Conference regular season champion and top-seeded Quebec Nordiques in the first round. The Rangers won the series in six games and handed the franchise its final series defeat in Quebec. The Rangers faced the Philadelphia Flyers in the second round and were promptly swept out of the playoffs.

Campbell led the Rangers back to the playoffs in 1995–96, as the team finished second behind the Flyers in the division. They then defeated the Montreal Canadiens in the opening series in six games after losing the first two but fell to the Pittsburgh Penguins in five games in the conference semifinals.

In 1996–97 Campbell's Rangers had their best and longest playoff run. Finishing fourth in their division but fifth in the conference, the Rangers knocked out the defending conference champion Florida Panthers in five games in the Eastern Conference Quarterfinals. They then upset their divisional rivals, the New Jersey Devils, in five games to advance to play the Flyers in the Eastern Conference Finals, where their run ended in five games.

After losing captain Mark Messier to free agency in the offseason and losing out on Joe Sakic in their quest to bring him to the team after the Colorado Avalanche matched the offer sheet the Rangers signed him to in 1997, Campbell's Rangers struggled out of the gate the next season and he was fired as coach after 57 games, and John Muckler replaced him. The Rangers would not make the playoffs that season, nor would they again until the 2005–06 season under head coach Tom Renney. Furthermore, the team also did not win another playoff series, nor mere postseason game until they swept the Atlanta Thrashers during the 2007 Eastern Conference Quarterfinals.

== Head coaching record ==
Team	Year	Regular season						Playoffs
Team	Year	G	W	L	T	Pts	Finish	Result
NYR	1994–95	48	22	23	3	47	4th in Atlantic	Lost in Conference Semifinals (PHI)
NYR	1995–96	82	41	27	14	96	2nd in Atlantic	Lost in Conference Semifinals (PIT)
NYR	1996–97	82	38	34	10	86	4th in Atlantic	Lost in Conference Finals (PHI)
NYR	1997–98	57	17	24	16	(68)	(fired)	—
Total		269	118	108	43			3 playoff appearances

== Executive career ==
Shortly after being fired by the Rangers, Campbell was hired by the NHL as the league's senior vice president and director of hockey operations, taking over from the departed Brian Burke. During Campbell's tenure, the NHL has faced a number of high-profile incidents that required Campbell's attention, most notably the Marty McSorley/Donald Brashear stick-swinging incident, which resulted in a year-long suspension for McSorley, and the Todd Bertuzzi hit on Steve Moore.

During the 2004–05 NHL lockout, Campbell chaired a committee that looked into adjusting NHL rules, resulting in major changes for the 2005–06 NHL season.

On November 1, 2006, Campbell rejected a five-year, $7.5 million offer from the Philadelphia Flyers to be their general manager. There was speculation that he was holding out for the general manager job with the Toronto Maple Leafs (a position eventually filled by Brian Burke) after general manager John Ferguson Jr.'s contract was terminated in January 2008.

On November 15, 2010, TSN and various other media outlets reported on a string of emails from Campbell. The email correspondence became a matter of public record in the wrongful dismissal case of referee Dean Warren against the NHL and the emails were entered into evidence in the case, although specific references to names and dates were blacked out. In these emails, Campbell calls Boston Bruins centre Marc Savard a "little fake artist" after Warren assessed Colin Campbell's son and Savard's future teammate, Gregory, a high-sticking minor on Savard and sending further emails to director of officiating Stephen Walkom complaining about the work of referees who gave Gregory a late-game penalty that resulted in a tying goal. In a follow-up interview with TSN, Campbell admitted "it (the email content) was inappropriate. But no one told me or maybe told you five years ago that you can take your emails and read them all." Despite the controversy and the admission of inappropriate content and accusations of bias, the NHL posted a strong backing of Campbell on their website and he continued in his role as the senior vice president until stepping down on June 1, 2011, Brendan Shanahan replaced his position as Vice President of Player Safety. He stepped aside just prior to his son playing in Game 1 of the 2011 Stanley Cup Finals.

During voting for the 2016 NHL All-Star Game, career enforcer John Scott was leading fan voting as captain of the Pacific Division. In a piece for the Players' Tribune, John Scott revealed that one NHL executive attempted to shame him out of competing, asking how his children would feel about his participation. It was revealed months later in a Twitter tirade from former player Steve Downie (who was also an enforcer in his playing career) that Campbell was this executive.

He currently continues his role as director of hockey operations.

== See also ==
- List of family relations in the NHL

Preceded by Mike Keenan	Head coach of the New York Rangers; 1994–1998	Succeeded by John Muckler
