= Steve Moore (ice hockey) =

Canadian ice hockey player (born 1978)

- Born: September 22, 1978 (age 48) Windsor, Ontario, Canada
- Height: 6 ft 2 in (188 cm)
- Weight: 210 lb (95 kg; 15 st 0 lb)
- Position: Centre
- Shot: Right
- Played for: Colorado Avalanche
- NHL draft: 53rd overall, 1998; Colorado Avalanche
- Playing career: 2001–2004

Steven Francis Moore (born September 22, 1978) is a Canadian former professional ice hockey player who played in parts of three National Hockey League (NHL) seasons with the Colorado Avalanche.

Moore is widely known for suffering a career-ending injury as a result of an on-ice altercation by then-Vancouver Canucks forward Todd Bertuzzi on March 8, 2004, as revenge for another incident involving Moore in a prior game between the teams that season. The fall-out from the event has contributed to a growing effort to curb gratuitous violence in hockey, and professional sports in general.

== Playing career ==
Steve Moore was drafted by the Colorado Avalanche in the 1998 NHL entry draft in the second round, the 53rd pick overall. He played hockey at Harvard. Moore played in 69 games for the Avalanche from 2001 to 2004, scoring five goals and seven assists, all of which were scored in the later season, before being seriously injured by Todd Bertuzzi who at the time played for the Vancouver Canucks.

=== Bertuzzi incident ===
On February 16, 2004, during a Vancouver-Colorado game, Moore injured Canucks team captain Markus Näslund with a high hit while Näslund was reaching for a puck through centre ice. Moore contacted Näslund's head in the play. No penalty was called in connection with the hit, but Näslund suffered a concussion and a bone chip in his elbow as a result, and missed three games. After reviewing tapes of the hit, the NHL ruled that the hit was legal and did not fine or suspend Moore. Canucks head coach Marc Crawford and general manager Brian Burke publicly criticized the non-call by the referees on the incident.

During the next game between the Canucks and Avalanche held in Denver on March 3, 2004, NHL commissioner Gary Bettman and NHL executive vice-president Colin Campbell attended the game, which ended in a tie and saw no major incidents break out.

However, on March 8, 2004, during another rematch between the Avalanche and Canucks, things went differently. In the first period, Moore fought Vancouver player Matt Cooke in a fairly even brawl, and served the 5-minute penalty for fighting. The Avalanche would go on to build up a large lead of 8–2 in a fight-filled game. Shortly before the midway mark of the third period, Todd Bertuzzi was sent onto the ice. After failing to instigate Moore to fight, Bertuzzi skated after Moore, pulled him back by the jersey and punched him in the back of the head. Rendered unconscious from the hit and pushed by Bertuzzi's weight and momentum, Moore fell head first into the ice. Moore's teammate Andrei Nikolishin and Bertuzzi's teammate Sean Pronger then piled on to Moore and Bertuzzi. Moore lay motionless for ten minutes before being carried off on a stretcher. The combination of the hit, fall, and piling-on had resulted in three cervical vertebrae fractures, facial cuts, and a concussion.

Bertuzzi was assessed a match penalty for his actions, which carries an automatic indefinite suspension under NHL rules. On March 11, 2004, the NHL announced Bertuzzi would remain suspended for at least the remainder of the Canucks' season, including any playoff games. The IIHF subsequently honoured the NHL suspension, preventing Bertuzzi from playing in any international tournaments or leagues during the 2004–05 NHL lockout, effectively leaving Bertuzzi professionally inactive for the entirety of the lockout season.

On August 22, 2004, Moore was released from a Denver-area hospital. He wore a neck brace for one year and then started physical therapy for his neck injury and concussion.

On February 17, 2005, Moore filed a civil lawsuit against Bertuzzi. Also named were Brad May (who was quoted as saying that there would "definitely be a bounty on Moore's head" after the game), Brian Burke and the Canucks organization. The lawsuit was thrown out in October 2005, with the judge suggesting that the lawsuit be re-filed in Canada, where the incident took place. The lawsuit was re-filed in Canada, in February 2006. On August 8, 2005, NHL Commissioner Gary Bettman announced that Bertuzzi would be allowed to play again at the start of the 2005–06 NHL season. In the league's decision, they cited many reasons for ending the suspension, such as:

- Bertuzzi serving a suspension of 20 games, which at the time tied for 4th longest in NHL history (13 regular season games, 7 playoff games)
- Bertuzzi's forfeited salary ($501,926.39 USD)
- Significant uncertainty, anxiety, stress and emotional pain caused to Bertuzzi's family
- The commissioner's belief that Bertuzzi was genuinely remorseful and apologetic for his actions

On August 12, 2005, Brian Burke, formerly Vancouver's general manager who was now serving in the same capacity with the Mighty Ducks of Anaheim, had made an offer to Moore. It was a two-way contract that would have paid Moore $475,000 US in the NHL and $75,000 if the player suited up for Portland, the Ducks' American Hockey League affiliate. Moore's lawyer Tim Danson described the offer as a self-serving attempt by Burke (who was a defendant in the lawsuit) to mitigate potential legal damages, by attempting to suggest Moore was a minor league player. Further, Danson said that Moore would return to the Avalanche except that Moore was not medically cleared to play hockey, which Brian Burke was well aware of, and described it as adding insult to injury.

On August 15, 2005, Bertuzzi broke his 17-month-long silence by expressing a desire to move on with his life. "I'm sure just like Steve Moore and his family, it's been difficult for both parties. I know I wish that day never happened. It's been some tough times, but I've got good family and good friends and good peers in the league that have helped me get over the hump and move forward and come through it."

On November 8, 2005, Moore's Toronto-based lawyer, Tim Danson, said that Moore was skating and doing regular workouts, but continued to suffer concussion-related symptoms. He continued working out for some years afterward, but had to abandon his comeback attempt when it became apparent he would never be medically cleared to return to the ice again.

In July 2012, former Avalanche enforcer Scott Parker, who had been a teammate of Moore's very briefly the season prior to the Bertuzzi incident in 2004, made some controversial comments. In an interview with milehighhockey.com, Parker was quoted as saying "he (Moore) went to Harvard, you know what, blow me. College grad. I never went to college, but I can kick your ass. I'll bring you right down to my IQ level if you want. I'll hit you about four times in the skull, that'll bring you right down."

==== Civil lawsuit ====
On February 16, 2006, Moore filed a civil suit in the province of Ontario against Bertuzzi, the Canucks, and the parent company of the Canucks, Orca Bay Sports and Entertainment, for damages suffered due to his NHL career being ended in his rookie year by Bertuzzi's attack. The lawsuit was seeking $15 million in pecuniary damages for loss of income, $1 million for aggravated damages, and $2 million for punitive damages. Moore's lawyer filed the suit one day before its two-year limitation expired, saying Moore initially did not want to file the suit if there was still a chance he could resume his career. Moore waited until the last minute until it was apparent he would never be medically cleared to play again.

Bettman attempted to get Bertuzzi and Moore to agree on an out-of-court settlement in the CA$19,500,000 lawsuit filed by Moore. Bertuzzi offered $350,000 to settle the case, an amount which was called "an insult" by Moore's lawyer.

On March 28, 2008, Bertuzzi filed a lawsuit against Crawford, alleging that he was contractually obliged to obey Crawford and that therefore Crawford shares responsibility for the injury to Moore. In response, Crawford later stated that Bertuzzi acted in "direct disobedience" to orders from the bench to get off the ice before attacking Moore. On January 14, 2013, The Toronto Star reported that both Moore v. Bertuzzi, et al. and Bertuzzi v. Crawford would begin, after having been postponed several times, in April 2013. Both cases were held in the Ontario Superior Court before a six-person jury.

On January 4, 2012, Bertuzzi dropped his third-party lawsuit against Crawford. In the month of October 2013, it was announced that the court date for Moore v. Bertuzzi, et al. will begin on September 8, 2014. On July 2, 2014, Moore's lawsuit was amended, seeking $68 million in damages, up from $38 million. On August 19, 2014, it was announced that an out-of-court settlement had been reached in Steve Moore's lawsuit. Terms of the settlement are confidential.

== Personal life ==
Steve Moore's older brother Mark, and younger brother, Dominic, all played four years at Harvard University. Because of their relative closeness in age, all three were able to play in the same year for Harvard during the 1999–2000 season. Dominic also went on to play in the NHL.

After learning he could not return to hockey, Moore returned to school, attending Stanford University where he earned an MBA. He now works as a venture capital investor. Moore resides in the Greater Toronto area with his wife and three children.

=== Activism ===
After years battling with the physical aftermath of the incident and learning more about concussions, Moore created the Steve Moore Foundation in 2010. The organization helps put on the annual charity event, Smashfest, which raises funds for concussion research. They have also paired with other charities to help fund research for rare cancers.

== Career statistics ==
			Regular season					Playoffs
Season	Team	League	GP	G	A	Pts	PIM	GP	G	A	Pts	PIM
1995–96	Thornhill Islanders	MetJHL	50	25	27	52	57	18	4	5	9	—
1996–97	Thornhill Islanders	MetJHL	50	34	52	86	52	13	10	11	21	2
1997–98	Harvard University	ECAC	33	10	23	33	46	—	—	—	—	—
1998–99	Harvard University	ECAC	30	18	13	31	34	—	—	—	—	—
1999–2000	Harvard University	ECAC	27	10	16	26	53	—	—	—	—	—
2000–01	Harvard University	ECAC	32	7	26	33	43	—	—	—	—	—
2001–02	Hershey Bears	AHL	68	10	17	27	31	8	0	1	1	6
2001–02	Colorado Avalanche	NHL	8	0	0	0	4	—	—	—	—	—
2002–03	Hershey Bears	AHL	58	10	13	23	41	5	0	1	1	4
2002–03	Colorado Avalanche	NHL	4	0	0	0	0	—	—	—	—	—
2003–04	Hershey Bears	AHL	13	4	4	8	6	—	—	—	—	—
2003–04	Colorado Avalanche	NHL	57	5	7	12	37	—	—	—	—	—
NHL totals			69	5	7	12	41	—	—	—	—	—

== Awards and honors ==
Award	Year
College
All-ECAC Hockey Rookie Team	1998
Ivy League Rookie of the Year	1998
Harvard Rookie of the Year	1998
Harvard Scoring Leader	1998, 1999, 2000
ECAC Rookie Scoring Leader	1998
ECAC First Team All-Rookie	1998
First Team All-Ivy League	1998, 1999, 2000
Harvard Most Valuable Player (MVP)	1999
All-ECAC First Team	1999
Ivy League Champions	2000
Harvard Hockey Captain	2001
AHL
Hershey Bears Rookie of the Year	2002

== See also ==
- Notable families in the NHL
- Violence in ice hockey
