= Brett Lindros =

Canadian ice hockey player (born 1975)

- Born: December 2, 1975 (age 50) London, Ontario, Canada
- Height: 6 ft 3 in (191 cm)
- Weight: 217 lb (98 kg; 15 st 7 lb)
- Position: Right wing
- Shot: Right
- Played for: New York Islanders
- National team: Canada
- NHL draft: 9th overall, 1994; New York Islanders
- Playing career: 1995–1996

Brett Alexander Blake Lindros (born December 2, 1975) is a Canadian former professional ice hockey player and television personality. He is the younger brother of Eric Lindros.

== Personal life ==
Lindros was born in London, Ontario and raised in Toronto, Ontario. The son of Carl Lindros and Bonnie Roszell-Lindros, Brett has Swedish heritage. The name "Lindros" means "Rose of the Linden tree". His great-grandfather Axel immigrated to Canada from Bredaryd, Sweden, and Brett is the third generation of the Lindros family to be born in Canada. His father Carl Lindros received a B.A. from the University of Western Ontario (where he played football, well enough to be drafted 30th overall by the Edmonton Eskimos in the 1970 CFL College Draft), and became a Chartered Accountant. His mother Bonnie is a registered nurse. He has one brother Eric and one sister Robin.

== Playing career ==
Lindros was drafted in the 1994 NHL entry draft, 1st round, 9th overall by the New York Islanders.

After suffering a series of concussions, he was forced to retire on May 1, 1996, due to post-concussion syndrome after playing only 51 NHL games. Lindros now works in Toronto for hedge fund HGC Investment Management.

== Life after hockey ==
Lindros was badly injured in a 2001 snowmobile accident; police reported that alcohol was a factor in the accident. The snowmobile was being driven by Dan Cameron, 25, of Toronto. Lindros, who was the passenger on the snowmobile, was charged with operating a snowmachine without a licence or permit.

== Career statistics ==
			Regular season					Playoffs
Season	Team	League	GP	G	A	Pts	PIM	GP	G	A	Pts	PIM
1991–92	St. Michael's Buzzers	MetJHL	34	21	21	42	210	6	5	5	10	63
1992–93	Canada	Intl	11	1	6	7	33	—	—	—	—	—
1992–93	Kingston Frontenacs	OHL	31	11	11	22	162	—	—	—	—	—
1993–94	Canada	Intl	44	7	7	14	118	—	—	—	—	—
1993–94	Kingston Frontenacs	OHL	15	4	6	10	94	3	0	0	0	18
1994–95	Kingston Frontenacs	OHL	26	24	23	47	63	—	—	—	—	—
1994–95	New York Islanders	NHL	33	1	3	4	100	—	—	—	—	—
1995–96	New York Islanders	NHL	18	1	2	3	47	—	—	—	—	—
NHL totals			51	2	5	7	147	—	—	—	—	—

== See also ==
- Notable families in the NHL

Preceded by Todd Bertuzzi	New York Islanders first-round draft pick 1994	Succeeded by Wade Redden
