= Bryan Allen (ice hockey) =

Canadian ice hockey player (born 1980)

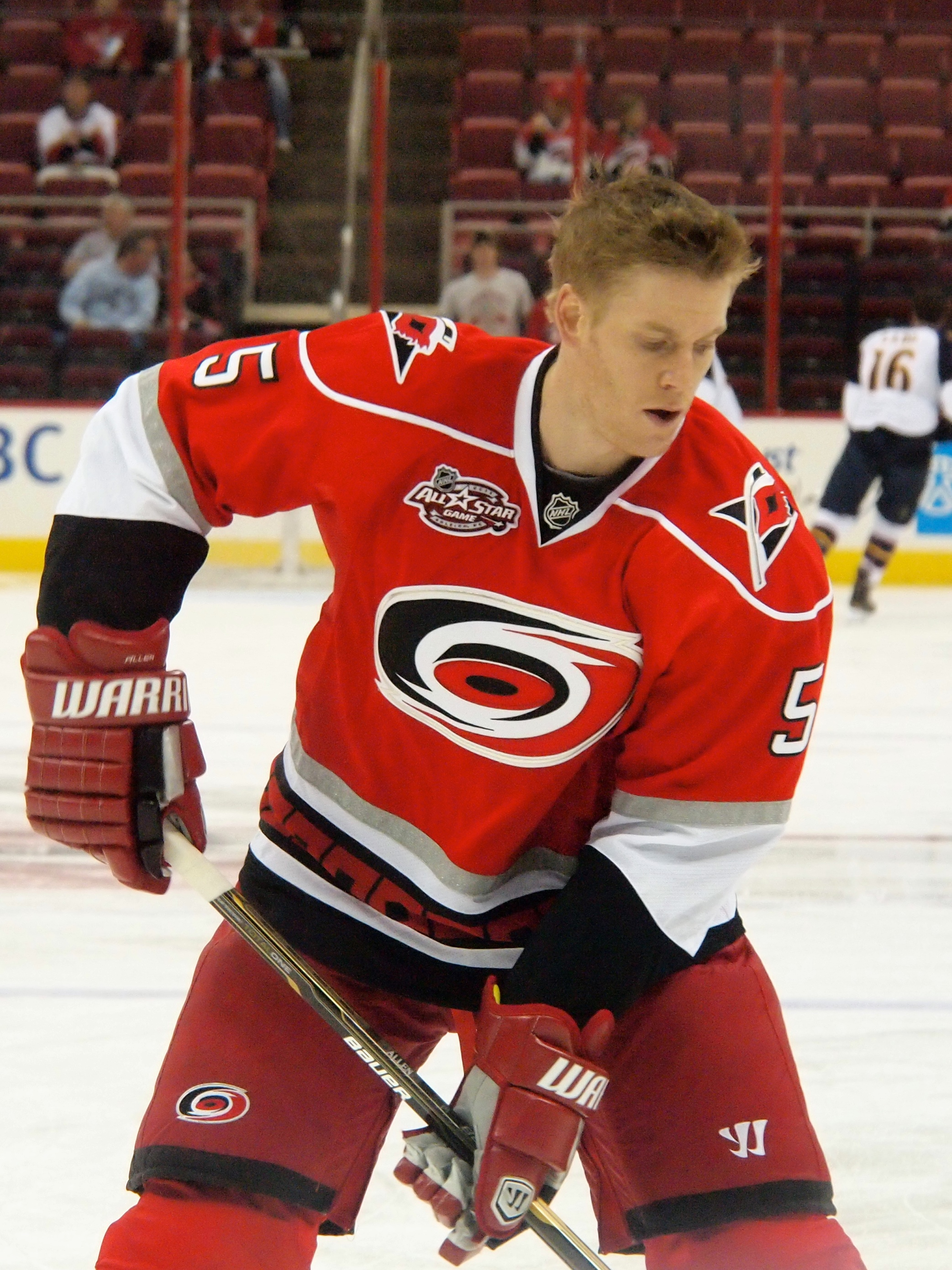
- Allen with the Carolina Hurricanes in 2011
- Born: August 21, 1980 (age 45) Kingston, Ontario, Canada
- Height: 6 ft 5 in (196 cm)
- Weight: 223 lb (101 kg; 15 st 13 lb)
- Position: Defence
- Shot: Left
- Played for: Vancouver Canucks; Florida Panthers; Carolina Hurricanes; Anaheim Ducks; Montreal Canadiens
- NHL draft: 4th overall, 1998; Vancouver Canucks
- Playing career: 2000–2015

Bryan Nigel Allen (born August 21, 1980) is a Canadian former professional ice hockey defenceman who played in the National Hockey League (NHL) between 2001 and 2014.

== Playing career ==
Allen was the fourth overall selection in the 1998 NHL entry draft to the Vancouver Canucks. A big, bruising defender with a mean streak, Allen earned comparisons to Derian Hatcher at the time of his selection.

Allen made the Canucks at age 18 in his first camp, but was unable to reach a contract with the team's management and returned to the Ontario Hockey League (OHL)'s Oshawa Generals, his junior team. Despite being limited to 37 out of his team's 66 games, his strong leadership style of play earned him OHL First All-Star Team honours. He was also selected to represent Canada at the 1999 World Junior Championships.

After missing substantial parts of the two previous seasons due to injury, he missed virtually all of the 1999–00 campaign following surgery.

Allen would play most of his first two professional seasons in minor-pro before earning a regular roster spot in the 2002–03 season, appearing in 48 games and scoring 5 goals. With the departure of Murray Baron in the summer of 2003, Allen became a regular for the Canucks and did a fine job of replacing Baron's size and physical play. He was especially a standout on the penalty kill, logging heavy minutes as the Canucks finished near the top of the NHL in that category. On November 5, Allen was suspended for two games following an incident on November 3 in which he slashed Detroit Red Wings forward Henrik Zetterberg, breaking his leg.

During the 2004–05 NHL lockout, Allen suited up for Khimik Voskresensk of the Russian Superleague (RSL) to stay in game shape. Back in Vancouver for the 2005–06 season, with the departures of Marek Malík and Brent Sopel, as well as long-term injuries to several other defenders, Allen's icetime skyrocketed and he became one of the team's most important defenders, finishing with career highs of 7 goals and 17 points.

On June 23, 2006, Allen was involved in a multi-player trade that sent him, Todd Bertuzzi and Alex Auld to the Florida Panthers in exchange for Roberto Luongo, Lukáš Krajíček and a sixth-round draft pick. The 2006–07 season would be the best of his career to date, as he set career highs with 21 assists and 25 points and established himself as one of the Panthers' top defenders.

A knee injury caused Allen to miss all but two games of the 2008–09 season with the Panthers.

On February 28, 2011, Allen was traded to the Carolina Hurricanes in exchange for forward Sergei Samsonov.

On July 1, 2012 Allen signed a three-year contract as a free agent with the Anaheim Ducks. On November 20, 2014 during the 2014–15 season, the final year of his contract, Allen was traded to the Montreal Canadiens in exchange for forward Rene Bourque.

== International play ==
Medal record

Representing Canada

Ice hockey

World Junior Championships
Silver medal – second place	1999 Winnipeg	

Allen represented Canada at the World Junior Championships. He recorded one goal and three points in 7 games to help Canada to a silver medal. His goal was a huge one, the tying goal late in the final against Russia, but Russia would ultimately win in overtime.

Allen was expected to be a leader for Canada at the 2000 World Junior Championships, but was unable to play as he was recovering from injury.

== Career statistics ==
=== Regular season and playoffs ===
			Regular season					Playoffs
Season	Team	League	GP	G	A	Pts	PIM	GP	G	A	Pts	PIM
1995–96	Amherstview Jets	EOJCHL	36	1	16	17	71	—	—	—	—	—
1996–97	Oshawa Generals	OHL	60	2	4	6	76	18	1	3	4	26
1997–98	Oshawa Generals	OHL	48	6	13	19	126	5	0	5	5	18
1998–99	Oshawa Generals	OHL	37	7	15	22	77	15	0	3	3	26
1999–00	Oshawa Generals	OHL	3	0	2	2	12	3	0	0	0	13
1999–00	Syracuse Crunch	AHL	9	1	1	2	11	2	0	0	0	2
2000–01	Kansas City Blades	IHL	75	5	20	25	99	—	—	—	—	—
2000–01	Vancouver Canucks	NHL	6	0	0	0	0	2	0	0	0	2
2001–02	Manitoba Moose	AHL	68	7	18	25	121	5	0	1	1	8
2001–02	Vancouver Canucks	NHL	11	0	0	0	6	—	—	—	—	—
2002–03	Manitoba Moose	AHL	7	0	1	1	4	—	—	—	—	—
2002–03	Vancouver Canucks	NHL	48	5	3	8	73	1	0	0	0	2
2003–04	Vancouver Canucks	NHL	74	2	5	7	94	4	0	0	0	2
2004–05	Khimik Voskresensk	RSL	19	0	3	3	34	—	—	—	—	—
2005–06	Vancouver Canucks	NHL	77	7	10	17	115	—	—	—	—	—
2006–07	Florida Panthers	NHL	82	4	21	25	112	—	—	—	—	—
2007–08	Florida Panthers	NHL	73	2	14	16	67	—	—	—	—	—
2008–09	Florida Panthers	NHL	2	0	1	1	0	—	—	—	—	—
2009–10	Florida Panthers	NHL	74	4	9	13	99	—	—	—	—	—
2010–11	Florida Panthers	NHL	53	4	8	12	63	—	—	—	—	—
2010–11	Carolina Hurricanes	NHL	19	0	5	5	19	—	—	—	—	—
2011–12	Carolina Hurricanes	NHL	82	1	13	14	76	—	—	—	—	—
2012–13	Anaheim Ducks	NHL	41	0	6	6	34	7	0	1	1	2
2013–14	Anaheim Ducks	NHL	68	0	10	10	75	13	1	0	1	28
2014–15	Norfolk Admirals	AHL	2	0	0	0	0	—	—	—	—	—
2014–15	Anaheim Ducks	NHL	6	0	1	1	4	—	—	—	—	—
2014–15	Montreal Canadiens	NHL	5	0	1	1	2	—	—	—	—	—
2014–15	Hamilton Bulldogs	AHL	35	1	5	6	24	—	—	—	—	—
NHL totals			721	29	107	136	839	27	1	1	2	36

=== International ===
Year	Team	Event	GP	G	A	Pts	PIM
1999	Canada	WJC	7	1	2	3	2
Junior totals			7	1	2	3	2

== Awards and honours ==
Award	Year
OHL
First All-Star Team	1999

Awards and achievements
Preceded by Brad Ference	Vancouver Canucks first-round draft pick 1998	Succeeded by Daniel Sedin
