= Lukáš Krajíček =

Czech ice hockey player (born 1983)

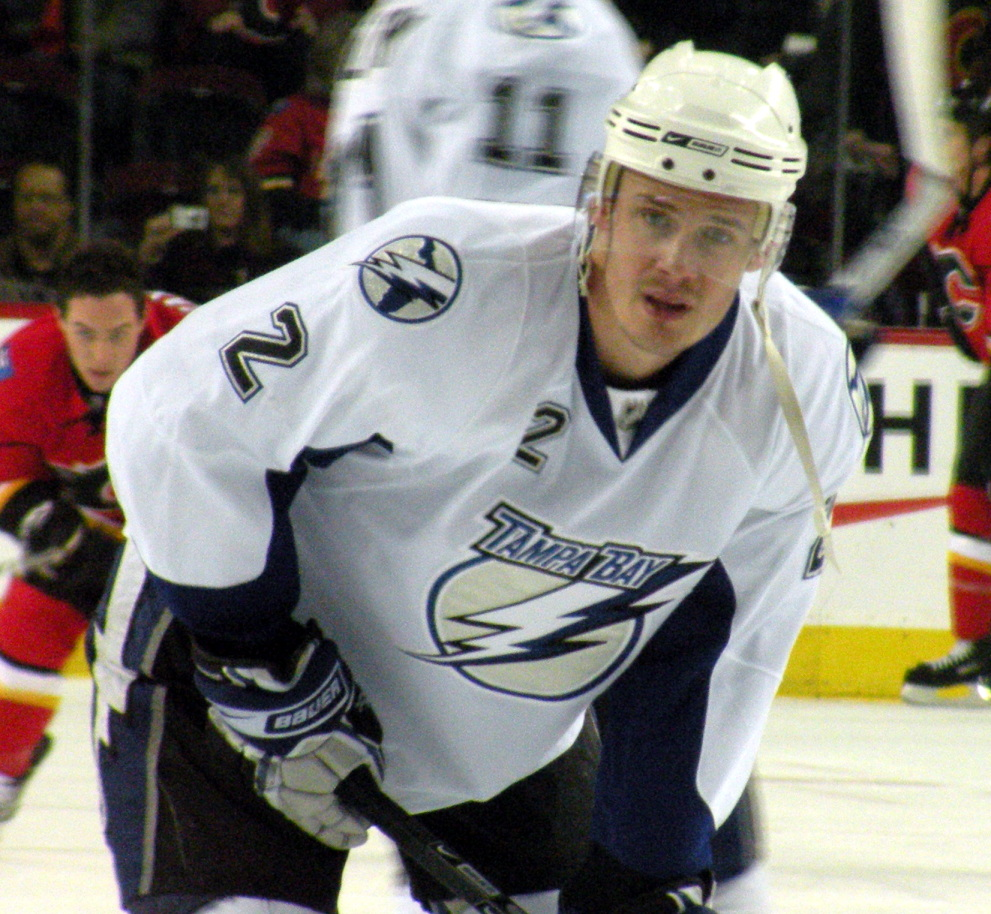
- Krajíček with the Tampa Bay Lightning in 2009
- Born: March 11, 1983 (age 43) Prostějov, Czechoslovakia
- Height: 6 ft 2 in (188 cm)
- Weight: 207 lb (94 kg; 14 st 11 lb)
- Position: Defence
- Shot: Left
- Played for: Florida Panthers; Vancouver Canucks; Tampa Bay Lightning; Philadelphia Flyers; HC Oceláři Třinec; HC Dinamo Minsk
- National team: Czech Republic
- NHL draft: 24th overall, 2001; Florida Panthers
- Playing career: 2002–2020

Lukáš Krajíček (Czech pronunciation: [ˈlukaːʃ ˈkrajiːtʃɛk], born March 11, 1983) is a Czech former professional ice hockey defenceman. He has previously played in the National Hockey League (NHL) for the Florida Panthers, Vancouver Canucks, Tampa Bay Lightning and Philadelphia Flyers, in the Kontinental Hockey League (KHL) for HC Dinamo Minsk and for HC Oceláři Třinec of the Czech Extraliga (ELH).

== Playing career ==
Krajíček played major junior in the Ontario Hockey League (OHL) with the Peterborough Petes. He posted 35 points in his draft year and was chosen in the first round, 24th overall, by the Florida Panthers in the 2001 NHL entry draft. He remained with the Petes for another two seasons and improved to 53 points in 52 games in 2002–03, his final year of junior.

Krajíček split the 2003–04 season between the Panthers and their American Hockey League (AHL) affiliate, the San Antonio Rampage, then played the entirety of 2004–05 with the Rampage due to the NHL lockout. When he returned, he earned a full-time roster spot with the Panthers and posted 16 points in 67 games.

In the off-season, Krajíček was involved in a blockbuster multi-player trade that sent him, Roberto Luongo, and a sixth-round draft pick in 2006 to the Vancouver Canucks for Todd Bertuzzi, Alex Auld, and Bryan Allen. He matched his 16-point output of the previous season with the Canucks in 2006–07, but had his second season in Vancouver shortened due to injury.

On October 6, 2008, Krajíček was traded along with prospect Juraj Šimek to the Tampa Bay Lightning for Michel Ouellet and Shane O'Brien.

Krajíček signed with the Philadelphia Flyers on January 31, 2010, after being released by Tampa Bay a week earlier.

On May 27, 2011, Krajíček signed with HC Dinamo Minsk of the KHL and quickly became one of the best defenceman there, forming the first pairing with the young player Dmitri Korobov. He is appreciated for his reliable and smart play in the defensive zone. Krajíček was awarded the title of the best defenceman of the first week of the 2011–12 KHL season.

== Career statistics ==
=== Regular season and playoffs ===
			Regular season					Playoffs
Season	Team	League	GP	G	A	Pts	PIM	GP	G	A	Pts	PIM
1998–99	HC ZPS–Barum Zlín	CZE U20	48	8	18	26	40	—	—	—	—	—
1999–2000	Detroit Compuware Ambassadors	NAHL	53	5	22	27	61	5	0	1	1	18
2000–01	Peterborough Petes	OHL	61	8	27	35	54	7	0	5	5	0
2001–02	Peterborough Petes	OHL	55	10	32	42	56	6	0	5	5	6
2001–02	Florida Panthers	NHL	5	0	0	0	0	—	—	—	—	—
2002–03	Peterborough Petes	OHL	52	11	42	53	42	7	0	3	3	0
2002–03	San Antonio Rampage	AHL	3	0	1	1	0	3	0	0	0	0
2003–04	San Antonio Rampage	AHL	54	5	12	17	24	—	—	—	—	—
2003–04	Florida Panthers	NHL	18	1	6	7	12	—	—	—	—	—
2004–05	San Antonio Rampage	AHL	78	2	22	24	57	—	—	—	—	—
2005–06	Florida Panthers	NHL	67	2	14	16	50	—	—	—	—	—
2006–07	Vancouver Canucks	NHL	78	3	13	16	64	12	0	2	2	12
2007–08	Vancouver Canucks	NHL	39	2	9	11	36	—	—	—	—	—
2008–09	Tampa Bay Lightning	NHL	71	2	17	19	48	—	—	—	—	—
2009–10	Tampa Bay Lightning	NHL	23	0	1	1	21	—	—	—	—	—
2009–10	Norfolk Admirals	AHL	15	0	6	6	8	—	—	—	—	—
2009–10	Philadelphia Flyers	NHL	27	1	1	2	14	22	0	3	3	8
2010–11	HC Oceláři Třinec	ELH	48	6	14	20	84	18	3	4	7	22
2011–12	Dinamo Minsk	KHL	40	2	12	14	34	4	0	0	0	6
2012–13	Dinamo Minsk	KHL	51	1	6	7	66	—	—	—	—	—
2013–14	Dinamo Minsk	KHL	52	2	14	16	63	—	—	—	—	—
2014–15	Dinamo Minsk	KHL	51	2	16	18	33	5	1	0	1	4
2015–16	Dinamo Minsk	KHL	44	0	8	8	58	—	—	—	—	—
2016–17	Dinamo Minsk	KHL	18	0	4	4	16	—	—	—	—	—
2016–17	HC Oceláři Třinec	ELH	23	1	5	6	8	6	0	4	4	6
2017–18	HC Oceláři Třinec	ELH	40	5	11	16	28	18	3	11	14	6
2018–19	HC Oceláři Třinec	ELH	31	5	16	21	20	—	—	—	—	—
2019–20	HC Oceláři Třinec	ELH	19	1	7	8	10	—	—	—	—	—
NHL totals			328	11	61	72	245	34	0	5	5	20
ELH totals			161	18	53	71	150	42	6	19	25	34
KHL totals			257	7	60	67	270	9	1	0	1	10

Medal record

Representing Czech Republic

World Championships
Silver medal – second place	2006 Riga	
Bronze medal – third place	2011 Bratislava	
Bronze medal – third place	2012 Helsinki	

=== International ===
Year	Team	Event	Result	GP	G	A	Pts	PIM
2002	Czech Republic	WJC	8th	7	1	3	4	6
2003	Czech Republic	WJC	5th	6	2	2	4	2
2006	Czech Republic	WC	2nd place, silver medalist(s)	9	0	0	0	8
2011	Czech Republic	WC	3rd place, bronze medalist(s)	8	0	1	1	8
2012	Czech Republic	WC	3rd place, bronze medalist(s)	10	1	3	4	6
2014	Czech Republic	OG	11th	4	0	0	0	0
Junior totals				13	3	5	8	8
Senior totals				31	1	4	5	22

== Transactions ==
- June 23, 2001 — Drafted by the Florida Panthers in the 1st round, 24th overall.
- June 23, 2006 — Traded to the Vancouver Canucks with Roberto Luongo and a 6th-round pick in 2006 for Todd Bertuzzi, Bryan Allen and Alex Auld.
- September 8, 2006 — Signed a one-year deal with the Vancouver Canucks.
- July 2, 2007 — Signed a two-year deal with the Vancouver Canucks as a restricted free agent.
- October 6, 2008 — Traded to the Tampa Bay Lightning along with Juraj Šimek in exchange for Michel Ouellet and Shane O'Brien.
- January 30, 2010 — Signed to an unrestricted free agent contract by the Philadelphia Flyers.

Awards and achievements
Preceded by Stephen Weiss	Florida Panthers first-round draft pick 2001	Succeeded by Jay Bouwmeester
