= Todd Bertuzzi =

Canadian ice hockey player (born 1975)

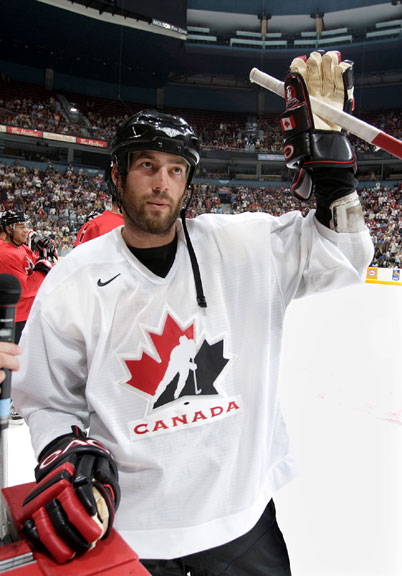
- Bertuzzi with Canada in 2005
- Born: February 2, 1975 (age 51) Sudbury, Ontario, Canada
- Height: 6 ft 3 in (191 cm)
- Weight: 246 lb (112 kg; 17 st 8 lb)
- Position: Right wing
- Shot: Left
- Played for: New York Islanders; Vancouver Canucks; Florida Panthers; Detroit Red Wings; Anaheim Ducks; Calgary Flames
- National team: Canada
- NHL draft: 23rd overall, 1993; New York Islanders
- Playing career: 1995–2015

Todd Bertuzzi (born February 2, 1975) is a Canadian former professional ice hockey winger. Known as a power forward, he has played in the National Hockey League (NHL) for the New York Islanders, Vancouver Canucks, Florida Panthers, Anaheim Ducks, Calgary Flames and Detroit Red Wings. He is widely known for his role in an infamous incident with Steve Moore, for which he was suspended by the NHL and IIHF, and criminally charged.

Selected 23rd overall by the New York Islanders in the 1993 NHL entry draft, he played at the junior level with the Guelph Storm of the Ontario Hockey League (OHL) for four seasons. In 1995–96, he played his rookie season with the Islanders. After 2 1/2 seasons with the Islanders, he was traded to the Vancouver Canucks. Bertuzzi enjoyed the most successful seasons of his career with the Canucks—his longest tenured team in the NHL—including NHL first team All-Star honours in 2003. In 2006, after 7 1/2 seasons with Vancouver, Bertuzzi was dealt to the Florida Panthers, for whom he briefly played until being traded again, this time to the Red Wings. He then played single seasons with the Anaheim Ducks and the Calgary Flames before returning to Detroit in 2009 and finishing his career there. Internationally, Bertuzzi has competed for Team Canada at the 2006 Winter Olympics in Turin, as well as the 1998 and 2000 World Championships.

He is the uncle of Tyler Bertuzzi, who plays in the NHL.

On April 7th, 2025, Bertuzzi was announced as the head coach of the Cambridge Redhawks of the Greater Ontario Junior Hockey League.

== Playing career ==
=== Guelph Storm (1991–95) ===
After playing for two minor hockey teams based out of Sudbury, Ontario, in 1990–91, Bertuzzi was selected in the first round (fifth overall) by the Guelph Storm in the 1991 Ontario Hockey League (OHL) Priority Selection. His future coach with the Vancouver Canucks, Marc Crawford, passed on Bertuzzi during the draft while he was general manager of the Cornwall Royals; he has recalled not selecting him due to "maturity issues" and that he was "a big kid who hadn't grown into his body yet." Bertuzzi started his OHL career for Guelph in 1991–92, recording 21 points over 42 games as a rookie. He missed the last 15 games of the regular season due to suspension as a result of kicking opposing defenceman Brad Barton during a contest between the Storm and Kitchener Rangers. After improving to 58 points over 60 games in 1992–93, he was selected 23rd overall by the New York Islanders in the 1993 NHL entry draft. The NHL Central Scouting Bureau described Bertuzzi as a physical and strong player with good skating who checks hard and is offensively effective in close proximity to the net.

Following his NHL draft, he underwent surgery for chipped bones in his left elbow in August 1993. As a result, he was unable to participate in the Islanders' training camp in September and was returned to the OHL. Playing in his third season for Guelph, he improved to 28 goals and 82 points over 61 games. Bertuzzi competed for an Islanders' roster spot at their 1994 training camp, but was sent back to his junior team after going scoreless in three exhibition games.

During his last campaign with Guelph in 1994–95, he recorded 119 points – sixth overall in the league. His 54 goals established a single-season team record, beating Mike Prokopec's mark, set the previous year, by two goals. The Storm's forward tandem of Bertuzzi and Jeff O'Neill, who finished fourth in league scoring, led the club to the best regular season record in the league. He went on to add a team-leading 33 points in 14 playoff games, en route to an OHL Finals loss to the Detroit Junior Red Wings. After four seasons with Guelph, he left the club ranked third all-time in career points with 280, behind O'Neill and Martin St. Pierre.

=== New York Islanders (1995–98) ===
Two years after his draft, Bertuzzi and the Islanders had not yet agreed to a contract. With Bertuzzi eligible to re-enter the draft if the Islanders did not sign him by July 7, 1995, general manager Don Maloney made it apparent that he would use the team's second overall pick in the 1995 NHL entry draft to select him again if a contract could not be agreed upon by the required date. Moments before the midnight deadline, the Islanders were able to sign Bertuzzi to a four-year, US$4.6 million contract. His agent, Pat Morris, had reportedly wanted a similar deal to that of fellow Islanders prospect Brett Lindros – a five-year, $6.7 million contract signed the previous summer.

During training camp in September 1995, Islanders head coach Mike Milbury heralded Bertuzzi as the team's best performing forward. Making his NHL debut on October 7, 1995, he scored a wrap around goal against goaltender Blaine Lacher in a 4–4 tie with the Boston Bruins. Beginning the season on the team's top line with Žigmund Pálffy and Travis Green, Bertuzzi finished his rookie year with 18 goals and 39 points over 76 games. The following season, Bertuzzi recorded 23 points in 64 games. The Islanders did not qualify for the playoffs in either of his two full seasons with the club, ranking second-last in the Eastern Conference in 1995–96 and 1996–97.

Bertuzzi's playing style as a power forward resulted in comparisons to former Islander Clark Gillies. As a result, the club hired Gillies to personally mentor Bertuzzi. Failing to meet lofty expectations from the club, Gillies once said of Bertuzzi, "If you're built like a freight train, you can't drive around like a Volkswagen." Feeling burdened with the pressure of playing up to the club's expectations while his offensive production diminished, he requested to be traded away at one point during the 1996–97 season. In response, Milbury, who had also taken over general manager duties the previous season, demoted Bertuzzi to the Islanders' minor league affiliate, the Utah Grizzlies of the International Hockey League (IHL). Playing 13 games in the minors, he registered 10 points before being called back up to the NHL. During the 1997–98 campaign, he continued to score below his pace as a rookie. On February 6, 1998, he was traded along with defenceman Bryan McCabe and a third-round selection in the 1998 NHL entry draft (Jarkko Ruutu) to the Vancouver Canucks in exchange for veteran forward Trevor Linden. The deal was made prior to the NHL's roster freeze in preparation for the 1998 Winter Olympics.

Bertuzzi and McCabe had both been widely regarded as the players of the future for New York after their respective drafts in 1993. While Milbury expressed regret at having to trade McCabe, relations between Bertuzzi and the club were strained. Welcoming the trade, Bertuzzi commented that "things weren't working out [in New York]."

=== Vancouver Canucks (1998–2006) ===
Bertuzzi immediately began producing with Vancouver, tallying 15 points in 22 games after the trade. Combined with his totals from New York, he finished with 33 points over 74 games in 1997–98. Contrasting his strained relationship with Milbury in New York, Canucks head coach Mike Keenan has recalled his experience with Bertuzzi upon his arrival as positive: "He came as a young player and he was very open-minded about learning about the game." Similar to the Islanders, Bertuzzi joined a struggling club in Vancouver; the team finished last in the Western Conference in his first two seasons after the trade.

After beginning the 1998–99 season on the Canucks' top line, Bertuzzi was limited to 32 games due to injuries, the first of which was a fractured tibia. He suffered the injury on November 1, 1998, after a shot by teammate Mattias Öhlund hit him in the leg. His season was later ended with a torn anterior cruciate ligament (ACL) in his left knee, suffered during a game on March 5, 1999. He recorded 8 goals and 16 points in 1998–99. In the off-season, Bertuzzi became a restricted free agent and was re-signed by the Canucks to a two-year contract in September 1999. The deal was reported by The Vancouver Sun to be worth a little over $2 million.

Returning from injury the following season, Bertuzzi emerged as one of the Canucks' best offensive contributors, finishing with 25 goals (second on the team to Markus Näslund) and 50 points in 1999–2000. At the end of the season, he received the team's Most Exciting Player Award, as voted by the fans. He received the distinction three more times during his career with the Canucks from 2002 to 2004). Meanwhile, the Canucks began improving as a team, finishing four points out of a playoff spot in the West in 2000.

The following season, Bertuzzi recorded his first career NHL hat trick, recording all three goals on the power play against San Jose Sharks goaltender Evgeni Nabokov in a 6–3 win on December 30, 2000. Bertuzzi recorded a second consecutive 25-goal season in 2000–01, adding 30 assists for 55 points, third in team scoring behind Näslund and Andrew Cassels. His -18 plus-minus rating, however, was a team-worst. The Canucks continued to improve, qualifying for the post-season for the first time in five years. Entering the 2001 playoffs as the final and eighth seed in the West, they were eliminated in the first round by the Colorado Avalanche. Bertuzzi scored two goals and two assists over four games in his first NHL post-season appearance. In the off-season, Bertuzzi filed for salary arbitration after initially failing to come to terms on a new contract with the Canucks. Both sides avoided arbitration by agreeing to a three-year deal on July 26, 2001.

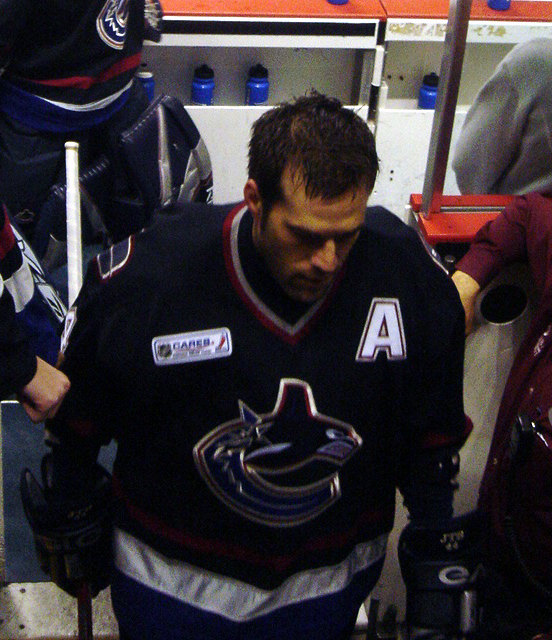
Bertuzzi spent seven-and-a-half seasons with the Canucks.

In the first month of the 2001–02 season, Bertuzzi received an automatic 10-game suspension from the league (forfeiting $118,557 in salary) after leaving the bench to help teammate Ed Jovanovski in a fight. The incident occurred during a game against the Colorado Avalanche in which opposing coach Bob Hartley sent enforcer Scott Parker onto the ice as the extra attacker during a delayed penalty. Parker proceeded to physically engage Jovanovski, at which point Bertuzzi left the bench to help his teammate. Vancouver struggled with him out of the lineup, winning 3 games during the 10-game span. Two months after returning from suspension, Bertuzzi went 15 consecutive games with at least a point, scoring 7 goals and 12 assists from January 3 – February 4, 2002. The streak tied Petr Nedvěd for the longest in Canucks history. During that span, in a game on January 9, Canucks head coach Marc Crawford replaced Andrew Cassels with Brendan Morrison, marking the beginning of what was considered by many to be the most effective line combination in the league for several seasons. Bertuzzi had emerged as an effective power forward, able to use his size and strength to position himself in front of the net, with good stickhandling ability. According to Canucks assistant coach Jack McIlhargey, Bertuzzi's skill set favourably complemented Näslund's goal-scoring and Morrison's playmaking abilities. The trio were dubbed by Vancouver media as the "West Coast Express", named after the city's commuter rail service of the same name.

Late in the 2001–02 season, Bertuzzi recorded his second career hat-trick on March 19, 2002, during a win against the New York Rangers. He scored his first two goals of the game against Dan Blackburn and his third into an empty net. Despite missing ten games from his suspension, Bertuzzi finished the 2001–02 season third in league-scoring with 85 points, behind Näslund and Calgary Flames forward Jarome Iginla. His 1.18 points-per-game average ranked second in the NHL behind Mario Lemieux, who played 48 fewer games than Bertuzzi. He also improved his plus-minus rating by 39 points from the previous season, finishing a career-high +21. Although the Canucks were the league's highest scoring team, they finished with the final seed in the West for the 2002 playoffs, ranking eighth in their conference. Facing the Detroit Red Wings in the opening round, they were eliminated in six games. Bertuzzi recorded four points in the series.

The following season, Bertuzzi appeared in his first NHL All-Star Game. He was joined by fellow Canucks Markus Näslund, defenceman Ed Jovanovski and head coach Marc Crawford, helping the Western Conference to a 6–5 shootout win against the East. Bertuzzi played on an all-star line with Näslund and Colorado Avalanche centre Peter Forsberg. Later in the season, Bertuzzi scored his third career hat-trick on March 17, 2003, scoring three goals against Ron Tugnutt in a game against the Dallas Stars. He finished the season with career-highs of 46 goals (third in the league), 51 assists and 97 points (fifth in the league). His 25 power play goals led the NHL and tied Pavel Bure for the Canucks' single-season record. Linemates Näslund and Morrison also recorded personal bests with 104 and 71 points, respectively. Meanwhile, the Canucks emerged as a top team in the West. Losing the Northwest Division title to the Avalanche by one point in the regular season, they finished as the fourth seed in their conference. After going down three-games-to-one in the opening round against the St. Louis Blues, Vancouver won three straight games to advance to the second round. Facing the Minnesota Wild, the Canucks gave up their own three-games-to-one series lead and were eliminated in seven games. During the series, Bertuzzi had reportedly walked by the Xcel Energy Center box office and told Wild fans they would not need their Game 6 tickets because Minnesota would be eliminated by then. In another on-ice incident, he skated by the opposing bench during Game 7 when the Canucks were winning 2–0, telling Wild players to "get [their] golf clubs". Despite his successful regular season, Bertuzzi struggled to score in the playoffs, recording 6 points in 14 games. In the off-season, Bertuzzi was named with Näslund to the NHL first All-Star team.

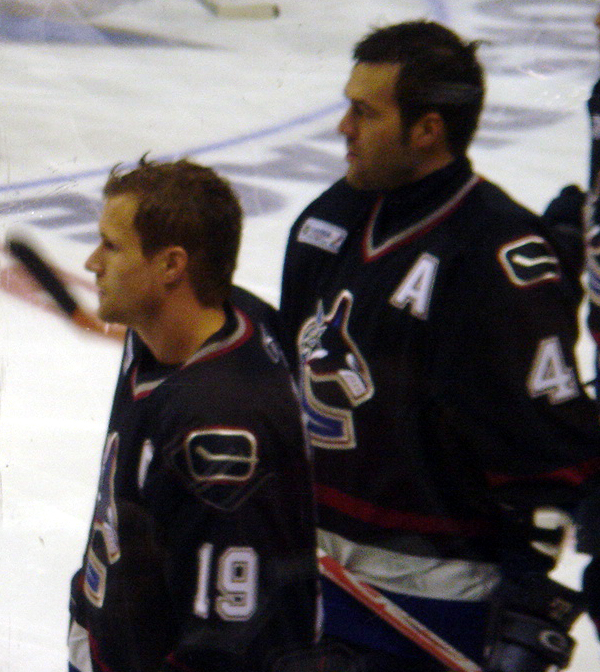
Näslund and Bertuzzi (right) formed a prolific duo for several years on the Canucks' top line.

With Bertuzzi entering the final year of his contract, the Canucks began negotiating a contract extension prior to the 2003–04 season. Despite Bertuzzi's agent, Pat Morris, declaring that they would cease negotiations once the season began, Bertuzzi signed a four-year, $27.8 million deal with the Canucks on October 23, 2003. The contract took effect immediately, erasing the last year on his previous contract, and included a $3 million signing bonus ($2.5 million paid in the first year and $500,000 in the second). The deal paid him $4.3 million the first year, $6.633 million the second year and $6.933 million for the third and fourth years.

In January 2004, Bertuzzi was voted by league fans to the starting lineup of the NHL All-Star Game. Representing the Western Conference alongside Näslund and Canucks head coach Marc Crawford, they were defeated by the East 6–4. Bertuzzi had two assists while playing on an all-star line with Näslund and Colorado Avalanche centre Joe Sakic. Nearing the end of the 2003–04 season, Bertuzzi was indefinitely suspended by the NHL for punching Colorado Avalanche forward Steve Moore from behind and driving his head into the ice during a game on March 8, 2004. His actions were a retaliation to a hit from Moore on Näslund during a previous game. Sitting out the remainder of the regular season and playoffs due to his suspension, he finished 2003–04 with 60 points over 69 games. Vancouver replaced Bertuzzi on the team's top line with Matt Cooke and went on to their first Northwest Division title, before being eliminated in the first round of the 2004 playoffs by the Calgary Flames.

Inactive in 2004–05 due to the players lockout and his ongoing suspension, which had been extended internationally, Bertuzzi returned to the Canucks in 2005–06, as the league ended his playing ban. He recorded 25 goals and 71 points, including two hat tricks (November 13, 2005, against the Detroit Red Wings and January 14, 2006, against the New York Islanders). Though he ranked third in team scoring, Crawford has recalled that by the end of the season, Näslund and Bertuzzi had been eclipsed by Daniel and Henrik Sedin as the team's offensive leaders.

There was speculation that the effects of the Steve Moore incident, which included assault charges and constant media coverage, were negatively affecting his play. While on the road, he was consistently heckled and booed by fans throughout the NHL. Näslund, a close friend of Bertuzzi's, later expressed sympathy for him, saying in a 2008 interview, "It still bothers me what Todd has had to go through...There's no question he was standing up for me...it all went too far."

Beyond the negative impact on Bertuzzi's individual play, the media speculated that the fallout from the Moore incident had become a distraction to the organization as a whole. Compounding the situation in Vancouver, the Canucks had missed the playoffs for the first time in four years. As such, general manager Dave Nonis spent the off-season making significant changes to the Canucks lineup. On June 23, 2006, he traded Bertuzzi to the Florida Panthers, along with goaltender Alex Auld and defenceman Bryan Allen, in exchange for goaltender Roberto Luongo, defenceman Lukáš Krajíček and a sixth-round selection in the 2006 NHL entry draft (Sergei Shirokov). After 7 1/2 seasons with the Canucks, Bertuzzi left the club ranked seventh all-time among franchise scoring leaders with 449 points.

=== Florida, Detroit, and Anaheim (2006–08) ===
Instrumental in facilitating the trade to Florida was Bertuzzi's positive relationship with Panthers general manager Mike Keenan, who was his first coach in Vancouver. Debuting with the Panthers on October 6, 2006, Bertuzzi scored a goal and three assists in an 8–3 win against the Boston Bruins. He appeared in six more games for Florida, notching seven points total, before being sidelined with back spasms. After being diagnosed with a herniated disc in early-November, Bertuzzi opted for surgery, which kept him out of the lineup for five months. While recovering, the Panthers dealt him to the Detroit Red Wings at the trade deadline in exchange for forward prospect Shawn Matthias and conditional draft picks. Bertuzzi was in the last year of his contract with no guarantee he would re-sign with Florida in the off-season.

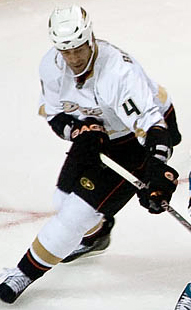
Bertuzzi spent one season with the Ducks in 2007–08.

Bertuzzi returned to action on March 22, 2007, debuting with his new team in a 2–1 shootout loss to the Columbus Blue Jackets. Eight days later, he scored his first goal as a Red Wing in a 4–3 shootout loss to the Dallas Stars. On April 7, he suffered a neck injury that kept him out of the lineup for the last game of the regular season and the first two games of the 2007 playoffs. He finished the campaign with 11 points in 15 games split between Florida and Detroit. During the playoffs, the Red Wings advanced to the Western Conference Finals, where they lost in six games to the Anaheim Ducks, who went on to win the Stanley Cup. Bertuzzi recorded 7 points in 16 playoff games.

Becoming an unrestricted free agent in the off-season, Bertuzzi agreed to a two-year, $8 million contract with the Anaheim Ducks on July 2, 2007. Signing him was Ducks general manager Brian Burke, who had served as the Canucks general manager during Bertuzzi's time in Vancouver. Bertuzzi had reportedly been in negotiations to re-sign with Detroit, but the club only wanted a one-year deal. Playing the Red Wings in the Ducks' first game of the regular season on October 3, 2007, he registered a goal and an assist in a 3–2 shootout loss. In the first month of the 2007–08 campaign, he suffered a concussion and was sidelined for 14 games in October and November 2007. Bertuzzi returned to the lineup in time for the Ducks' away game against the Canucks on November 27, which marked his first NHL game in Vancouver since being traded away. Bertuzzi was received warmly by Canucks fans, as the Ducks lost the game 4–0. Playing in 68 contests over the season, he registered 40 points with Anaheim. Entering the 2008 playoffs as the defending champions, the Ducks were eliminated in the first round four games to two by the Dallas Stars. In six playoff contests, Bertuzzi recorded two assists.

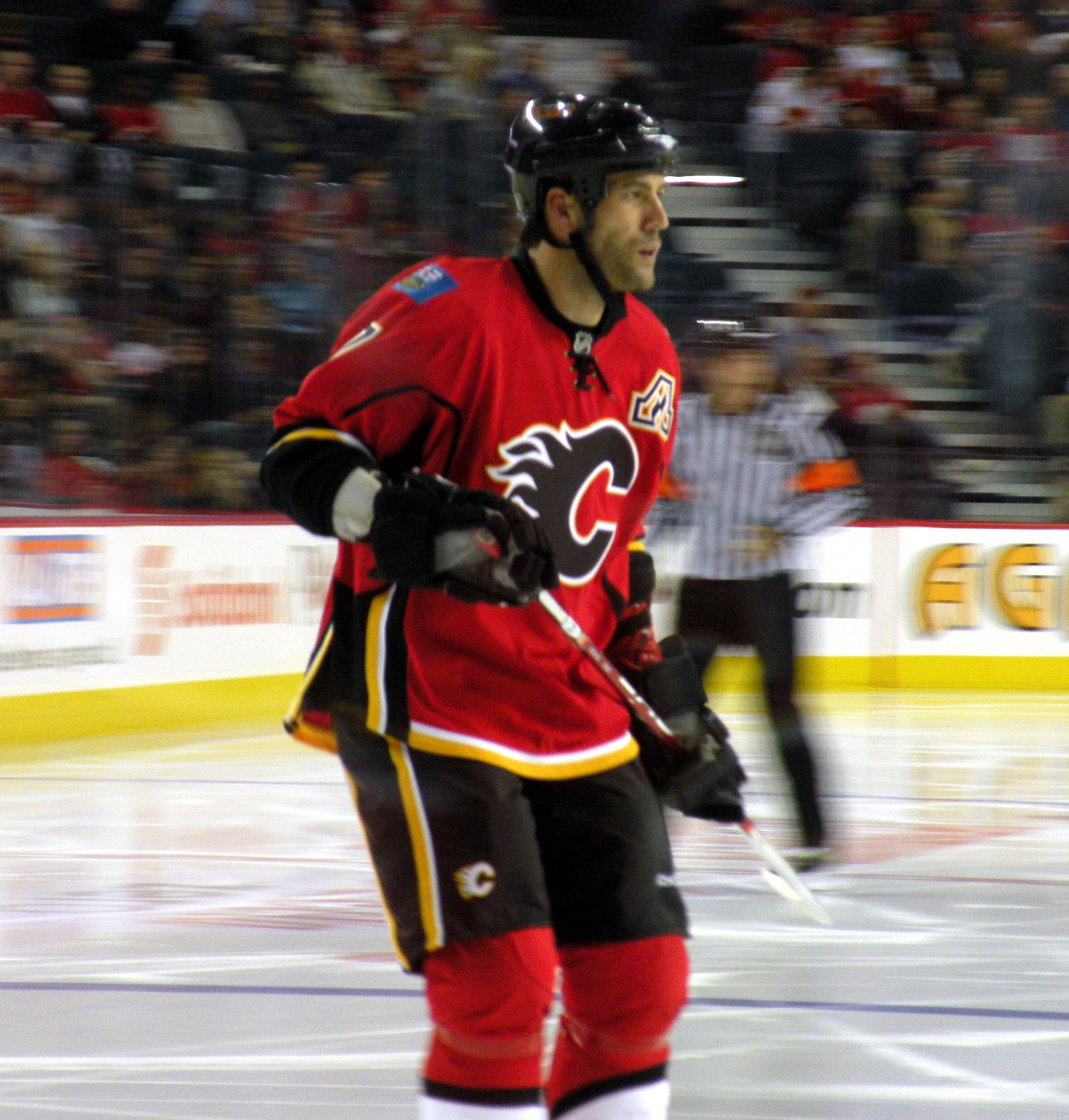
Bertuzzi signed with the Calgary Flames in 2008.

=== Calgary Flames (2008–09) ===
During the subsequent summer, several Ducks players were set to become free agents, including high-profile forward Corey Perry. Requiring additional salary cap space to make room for defenceman Scott Niedermayer, who announced he was returning for another season, Bertuzzi was placed on unconditional waivers with the intention of buying out the remaining year on his contract. Addressing Bertuzzi's buy out with the media, Burke asserted that he "believe[d] [Bertuzzi] can still play at the NHL level," and that the Ducks were merely "handcuffed by [their] salary cap situation." Bertuzzi once again became an unrestricted free agent and signed a one-year, $1.95 million contract with the Calgary Flames on July 7, 2008. Joining Calgary, he was reunited with Flames coach Mike Keenan. Before the start of the 2008–09 season, Bertuzzi switched jersey numbers from 4 to 7, in honour of his boyhood idol, Phil Esposito. The numbers 44, which Bertuzzi wore in New York, Vancouver and Detroit, and 4, which he wore in Anaheim, were already taken in Calgary.

Bertuzzi scored his first goal with the Flames, deflecting a Dion Phaneuf shot, on October 11, 2008, in a 5–4 overtime loss to the Vancouver Canucks. While initial fan reaction to Bertuzzi was negative due to his previous role with the division-rival Canucks, as well as his reputation following the Steve Moore incident, he was eventually accepted in Calgary. In January 2009, he missed five games due to a back injury. Several months later, he was sidelined again with a knee injury and underwent arthroscopic surgery to repair damaged cartilage on March 3, 2009. Missing 11 games, he returned in time for the 2009 playoffs, where the Flames were eliminated by the Chicago Blackhawks in the opening round. He finished his only season in Calgary with 44 points in 66 regular season games, while adding a goal and an assist in six playoff contests.

=== Return to Detroit (2009–2014) ===
On August 18, 2009, Bertuzzi re-joined the Red Wings by accepting a one-year contract with the club worth $1.5 million. He recorded 44 points (18 goals and 26 assists) in 2009–10, ranking fifth in team scoring. During the second round of the 2010 playoffs, Bertuzzi recorded a career-high five-point contest (a goal and four assists) in a Game 4 victory against the San Jose Sharks. Bertuzzi finished with a playoffs career-high 11 points in 12 games.

In the off-season, Bertuzzi signed a two-year, $3.875 million contract extension with the Red Wings on June 16, 2010. During the 2010–11 season, he appeared in his 1,000th NHL game on February 20, 2011, against the Minnesota Wild. Bertuzzi scored a shootout goal to help Detroit win the game 2–1. Dressing for 81 games that season, he ranked seventh in team scoring with 45 points (16 goals and 29 assists). During the 2011 playoffs, he added 6 points (2 goals and 4 assists) over 11 games as the Red Wings were eliminated in the second round by the San Jose Sharks.

On February 23, 2012, Bertuzzi re-signed with the Red Wings for $4.15 million over two years. He dressed for seven games in the lockout-shortened 2012-2013 regular season due to injuries, producing three points, and was held pointless over six games in the playoffs. In the 2013–2014 season he played 59 games and produced 16 points, but was a healthy scratch 15 times; he played one playoff game without a point.

During his time with Detroit, he earned praise from head coach Mike Babcock and teammates for adapting his playing style to be more defensively responsible. Bertuzzi credited the influence of teammates Pavel Datsyuk and Henrik Zetterberg, both successful two-way players in the league.

=== Binghamton Senators tryout and retirement (2015) ===
On January 9, 2015, he signed a professional tryout contract with the Ottawa Senators AHL affiliate the Binghamton Senators in hopes to get a contract with Ottawa. Bertuzzi was released from his professional tryout offer with Binghamton on January 21, 2015, after posting no points and a minus-3 rating in his 2 games played with the Senators. He subsequently retired that year.

== International play ==
Bertuzzi debuted internationally for Team Canada at the 1998 World Championships in Switzerland. He was among the youngest players selected to the team, along with Canucks teammate Bryan McCabe and Chicago Blackhawks forward Eric Dazé, who were all born in 1975 (third-string goaltender Christian Bronsard was two years younger, but did not play in any games). In six games, he recorded three points, as Canada failed to qualify for the medal rounds.

Two years later, Bertuzzi competed at the 2000 World Championships in St. Petersburg, Russia. One of five Canucks players chosen to the national team, he was joined by Adrian Aucoin, Ed Jovanovski, Brendan Morrison and Peter Schaefer. His second tournament appearance was more productive, as he scored nine points in nine games – first among Canadian players and fourth overall – while also leading the tournament in penalty minutes with 47. Canada did not medal, losing to Finland in the bronze medal game by a 2–1 score. His 63 total penalty minutes from both tournament appearances set an all-time Canadian record for World Championship competitors since 1977 (when Canada resumed competing in the tournament).

In December 2005, Bertuzzi was controversially selected to play for Team Canada at the 2006 Winter Olympics in Turin, Italy. His inclusion, along with that of Dany Heatley and Shane Doan, (Note: Heatley was on probation after pleading guilty to vehicular homicide in 2005, while Doan had been previously accused of uttering a racial slur at a Francophone referee during an NHL game.) was discussed at length by the Canadian Olympic Committee (COC). The committee had concerns stemming from the Steve Moore incident and Bertuzzi's probationary status, but subsequently approved his representation of Canada at the Olympics. According to a Canadian Press article, "[COC president] Chambers said the [unusual meeting] was prompted by some media concerns raised over the three athletes participating in the Games. The fact it took the committee so long to approve the list means there was some debate."

Bertuzzi went on to post three points (all assists) at the 2006 Olympics, tying for second in team scoring with nine other players. Canada failed to advance past the quarterfinal, losing to Russia by a 2–0 score. They finished in seventh place overall after winning gold at the previous Winter Olympics in 2002.

== Steve Moore incident ==
On February 16, 2004, during a game between Vancouver and Colorado, Avalanche center Steve Moore checked Markus Näslund in the head, causing a minor concussion and a bone chip in his elbow. No penalty was assessed, and the league decided not to fine or suspend Moore, ruling the hit legal. Näslund missed three games as a result of the hit. In a rematch, with the Canucks trailing the Avalanche 8–2 in the third period, Bertuzzi began following Moore around the ice, attempting to provoke him into another fight. With Moore ignoring him, Bertuzzi grabbed Moore's jersey from behind and punched him in the side of the face from behind. Moore's face hit the ice as Bertuzzi pushed him, already out cold, and broke his neck. Bertuzzi, as well as several other players from both teams, landed atop Moore as he fell to the ice. Bertuzzi was assessed a match penalty and ejected from the game. Per league rules, he was also suspended indefinitely pending a ruling from league commissioner Gary Bettman.

After lying on the ice for approximately 10 minutes, Moore was removed from the playing surface on a stretcher. He was treated for three fractured vertebrae in his neck, a grade three concussion, vertebral ligament damage, stretching of the brachial plexus nerves, and facial lacerations. He was also suffering from amnesia. Bertuzzi apologized to Moore and his family, as well as to Burke, Canucks owner John McCaw, Jr., the Canucks organization, his teammates, and the fans in a press conference two days later.

On March 11, 2004, the league ruled he would remain suspended for at least the remainder of the Canucks' season, which ultimately cost him the final 13 games of the regular season plus seven playoff games. The Canucks were additionally fined $250,000. While the following NHL season was suspended due to the 2004–05 lockout, Bertuzzi intended to play in Europe, but the International Ice Hockey Federation (IIHF) extended his NHL suspension to cover their jurisdiction. Bertuzzi remained professionally inactive during the 2004–05 season. The IIHF's sanction also kept him from representing Canada in the 2004 and 2005 World Championships, as well as the 2004 World Cup.

Bettman scheduled a reinstatement hearing for Bertuzzi on April 26, 2005. The hearing was attended separately by Bertuzzi and Moore. Prior to the 2005–06 season, Bettman announced Bertuzzi's reinstatement on August 8, citing that "Mr. Bertuzzi had paid a very significant price for his conduct," adding that he felt Bertuzzi was "genuinely remorseful and apologetic." Bertuzzi's 17-month suspension caused him to miss a total of 20 games—the fourth-longest suspension in NHL history at the time. The suspension accounted for $501,926.39 in forfeited salary, as well as an approximate $350,000 in lost endorsements. On the day of his reinstatement, Team Canada's executive director, Wayne Gretzky, offered him a spot on the national team's summer orientation camp in preparation for the 2006 Winter Olympics.

=== Legal actions ===
After a four-month investigation, the criminal justice branch of the Attorney General of British Columbia announced formal charges of assault causing bodily harm against Bertuzzi on June 24, 2004. With the charge, Bertuzzi faced up to 1 1/2 years in prison. Bertuzzi pleaded guilty to the assault charge on December 22 after arranging a plea bargain with prosecutors. He was given a conditional discharge requiring 80 hours of community service and one year's probation that additionally prohibited him from playing in any hockey game Moore was competing in. Under Canadian law, Bertuzzi's successful completion of his probationary period precluded him from a criminal record. Moore expressed disappointment regarding Bertuzzi's discharge and was upset that he was unable to attend the court date, having to issue a written victim statement instead. Moore's lawyer, Tim Danson, was given one day's notice of the court date following Bertuzzi's plea bargain, which he said was insufficient time for Moore to travel to Vancouver.

On February 17, 2005, Moore filed a lawsuit in a Colorado court against Bertuzzi, numerous individuals within the Canucks organization, including Brad May (Bertuzzi's teammate at the time who was quoted as saying that there would "definitely be a price on Moore's head" after Moore's hit on Näslund), Brian Burke, Marc Crawford, as well as the Canucks organization as a whole and the Orca Bay Sports and Entertainment company that owned the team. The lawsuit was thrown out in October 2005, as the Colorado judge ruled the case was better suited for Canadian courts, as Moore and all the defendants were Canadian citizens. Planning to appeal the decision, Danson stated publicly the following month that Moore had begun skating and doing regular workouts, but continued to suffer concussion-related symptoms.

On February 16, 2006, Moore filed another lawsuit in the Ontario Superior Court against Bertuzzi, the Canucks, and Orca Bay, seeking CAD$15 million in pecuniary damages for loss of income, CAD$1 million for aggravated damages, and CAD$2 million for punitive damages. Moore's parents, who were watching their son on television when the attack happened, also sued, seeking CAD$1.5 million for "negligent infliction of nervous shock and mental distress". In December 2006, Bettman and top lieutenant Bill Daly facilitated a meeting between Moore's representatives and the defendants in hopes of agreeing on an out-of-court settlement. An out-of-court settlement was reached in Moore's lawsuit in October 2014. Terms of the settlement are confidential.

== Personal life ==
Bertuzzi was born and raised in Sudbury, Ontario. His father, Albert Bertuzzi, is an Italian-Canadian who worked in the window-washing business. When Bertuzzi was a teenager, Albert survived a near-fatal car accident in which he was thrown from the vehicle through the windshield. His father has stated that he was proud of his own local reputation as a "dirty player" and referred to it as a "Bertuzzi trait".

Growing up, Bertuzzi played minor hockey with the Nickel Centre and Sudbury Minor Hockey programs. In 1990–91, Bertuzzi played as an underaged player in the major midget ranks with the Sudbury Capitals AAA team. Physically built as a power forward throughout his youth, he stood 6 feet and 2 inches (1.88 metres) and weighed 195 pounds (88.5 kilograms) by age 15.

Bertuzzi and his wife, Julie, were married in July 1996. They have two children. His son, Tag Bertuzzi, who plays for the Toledo Walleye of the ECHL, and who was invited to the Florida Panthers development roster in 2022, was drafted into the OHL by the Guelph Storm, 2nd overall in 2017. Bertuzzi is a recreational golfer and has credited the sport with allowing him to relax more as a hockey player. During his 10-game suspension from the NHL in October and November 2001, he played golf to focus his energy. Afterwards, he made it a custom to go to the driving range before every game.

Bertuzzi's nephew Tyler Bertuzzi plays in the NHL.

He is currently the head coach of the Cambridge Redhawks of the Greater Ontario Junior Hockey League.

== Career statistics ==
=== Regular season and playoffs ===
			Regular season					Playoffs
Season	Team	League	GP	G	A	Pts	PIM	GP	G	A	Pts	PIM
1990–91	Sudbury Wolf Cubs AAA	Midget	48	25	46	71	247	—	—	—	—	—
1990–91	Sudbury Cubs	NOJHL	3	3	2	5	10	—	—	—	—	—
1991–92	Guelph Storm	OHL	42	7	14	21	145	—	—	—	—	—
1992–93	Guelph Storm	OHL	60	27	31	58	168	5	2	2	4	6
1993–94	Guelph Storm	OHL	61	28	54	82	165	9	2	6	8	30
1994–95	Guelph Storm	OHL	62	54	65	119	58	14	15	18	33	41
1995–96	New York Islanders	NHL	76	18	21	39	83	—	—	—	—	—
1996–97	Utah Grizzlies	IHL	13	5	5	10	16	—	—	—	—	—
1996–97	New York Islanders	NHL	64	10	13	23	68	—	—	—	—	—
1997–98	New York Islanders	NHL	52	7	11	18	58	—	—	—	—	—
1997–98	Vancouver Canucks	NHL	22	6	9	15	63	—	—	—	—	—
1998–99	Vancouver Canucks	NHL	32	8	8	16	44	—	—	—	—	—
1999–2000	Vancouver Canucks	NHL	80	25	25	50	126	—	—	—	—	—
2000–01	Vancouver Canucks	NHL	79	25	30	55	93	4	2	2	4	8
2001–02	Vancouver Canucks	NHL	72	36	49	85	110	6	2	2	4	14
2002–03	Vancouver Canucks	NHL	82	46	51	97	144	14	2	4	6	60
2003–04	Vancouver Canucks	NHL	69	17	43	60	122	—	—	—	—	—
2005–06	Vancouver Canucks	NHL	82	25	46	71	120	—	—	—	—	—
2006–07	Florida Panthers	NHL	7	1	6	7	13	—	—	—	—	—
2006–07	Detroit Red Wings	NHL	8	2	2	4	6	16	3	4	7	15
2007–08	Anaheim Ducks	NHL	68	14	26	40	97	6	0	2	2	14
2008–09	Calgary Flames	NHL	66	15	29	44	74	6	1	1	2	8
2009–10	Detroit Red Wings	NHL	82	18	26	44	80	12	2	9	11	12
2010–11	Detroit Red Wings	NHL	81	16	29	45	71	11	2	4	6	15
2011–12	Detroit Red Wings	NHL	71	14	24	38	64	5	0	0	0	9
2012–13	Detroit Red Wings	NHL	7	2	1	3	2	6	0	0	0	2
2013–14	Detroit Red Wings	NHL	59	9	7	16	40	1	0	0	0	2
2014–15	Binghamton Senators	AHL	2	0	0	0	0	—	—	—	—	—
NHL totals			1,159	314	456	770	1,478	87	14	28	42	159

=== International ===
Year	Team	Event	Result	GP	G	A	Pts	PIM
1998	Canada	WC	6th	6	1	2	3	16
2000	Canada	WC	4th	9	5	4	9	47
2006	Canada	OG	5th	6	0	3	3	6
Senior totals				21	6	9	15	69

== Awards ==
Award	Year(s)
OHL second All-Star team	1995
Most Exciting Player Award (Vancouver Canucks)	2000, 2002, 2003, 2004
NHL first All-Star team	2003
NHL All-Star Game	2003, 2004 (starter)

== Records ==
- Guelph Storm team record; most goals, single season—54 in 1994–95 (surpassed Mike Prokopec, 52 goals in 1992–93)
- Vancouver Canucks team record; longest point-scoring streak—15 games (7 goals, 12 assists; January 3 – February 4, 2003) (tied with Petr Nedved; November 19 – December 27, 1992)
- Vancouver Canucks team record; most powerplay goals, single season—25 in 2002–03 (tied with Pavel Bure)

== Transactions ==
- June 26, 1993: Drafted 23rd overall by the New York Islanders
- July 6, 1995: Signed to a four-year, $4.6 million contract with the New York Islanders
- February 6, 1998: Traded to the Vancouver Canucks from the New York Islanders with Bryan McCabe and a 3rd round choice in 1998 (Jarkko Ruutu) for Trevor Linden
- September 1999: Re-signed to a two-year contract with the Vancouver Canucks
- October 27, 2003: Signed a four-year, $27.9 million contract extension with the Vancouver Canucks
- March 11, 2004: Suspended indefinitely by the NHL for deliberate injury to Steve Moore in a game versus the Colorado Avalanche
- August 8, 2005: Officially reinstated by the NHL
- June 23, 2006: Traded to the Florida Panthers by the Vancouver Canucks with Bryan Allen and Alex Auld for Roberto Luongo, Lukas Krajicek and a sixth-round draft choice in 2006 (Sergei Shirokov)
- February 27, 2007: Traded to the Detroit Red Wings by the Florida Panthers for prospect Shawn Matthias and conditional draft picks
- July 2, 2007: Signed a two-year, $8 million contract as an unrestricted free agent with the Anaheim Ducks
- June 28, 2008: Placed on waivers by the Anaheim Ducks; subsequently bought out
- July 7, 2008: Signed a one-year $1.95 million contract as an unrestricted free agent with the Calgary Flames
- August 18, 2009: Signed a one-year $1.5 million contract as an unrestricted free agent with the Detroit Red Wings
- May 10, 2010: Signed a two-year, $3.85 million contract extension with the Detroit Red Wings
- February 23, 2012: Signed a two-year, $4.15 million contract extension with the Detroit Red Wings

== See also ==
- List of NHL players with 1,000 games played

Preceded by Darius Kasparaitis	New York Islanders first-round draft pick 1993	Succeeded by Brett Lindros
