= Alex Auld =

Canadian ice hockey player (born 1981)

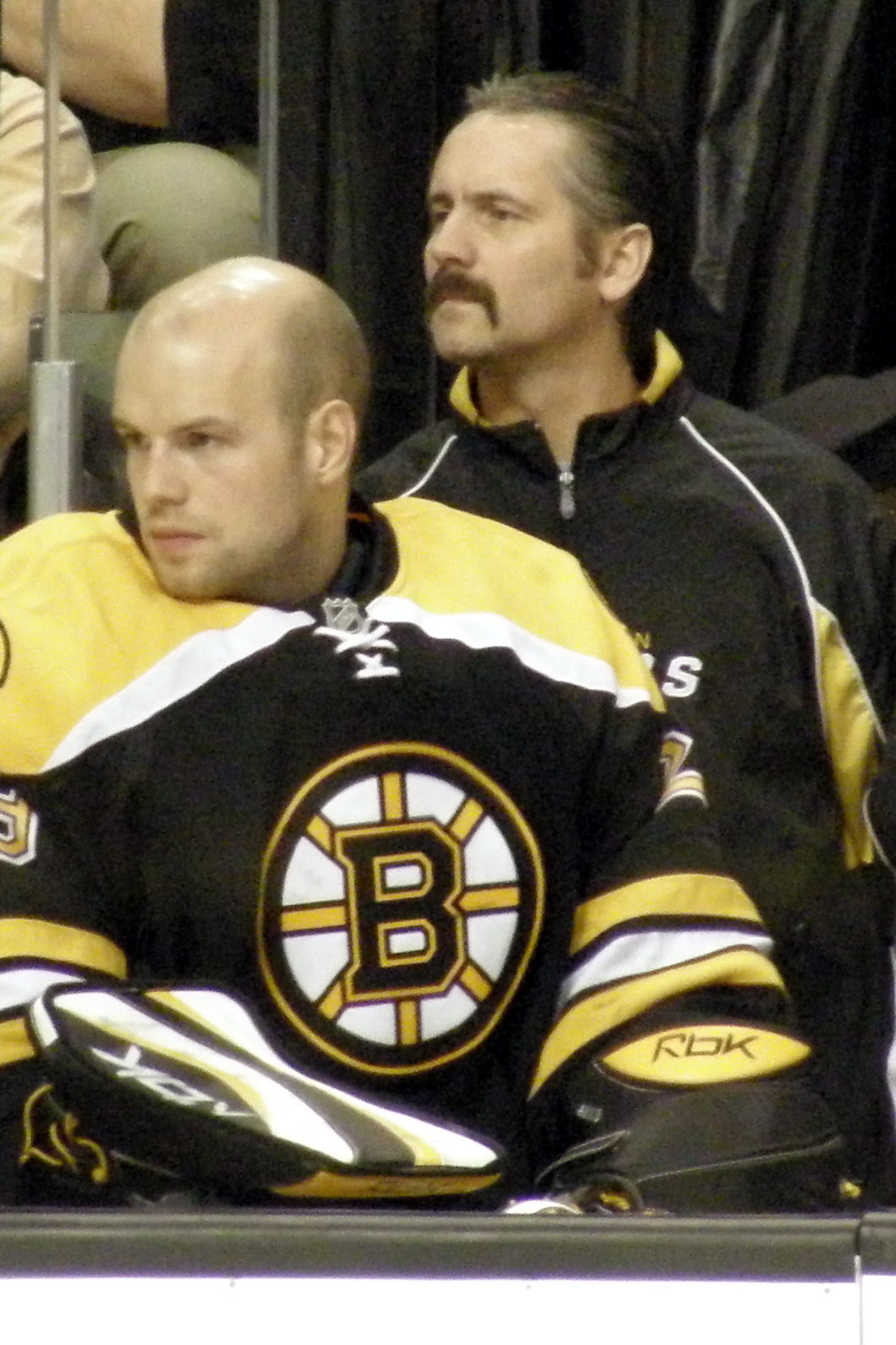
- Auld with the Boston Bruins in 2007
- Born: January 7, 1981 (age 45) Cold Lake, Alberta, Canada
- Height: 6 ft 5 in (196 cm)
- Weight: 223 lb (101 kg; 15 st 13 lb)
- Position: Goaltender
- Caught: Left
- Played for: Vancouver Canucks; Florida Panthers; Phoenix Coyotes; Boston Bruins; Ottawa Senators; Dallas Stars; New York Rangers; Montreal Canadiens; Red Bull Salzburg
- National team: Canada
- NHL draft: 40th overall, 1999; Florida Panthers
- Playing career: 2001–2013

Alexander James Auld (born January 7, 1981) is a Canadian former professional ice hockey goaltender. Auld played in the National Hockey League (NHL) with the Vancouver Canucks, Florida Panthers, Phoenix Coyotes, Boston Bruins, Ottawa Senators, Dallas Stars, New York Rangers and the Montreal Canadiens from 2002 to 2012. He has also appeared internationally for the Canadian national team on three occasions: the 2001 World Junior Championships, the 2004 Spengler Cup, and the 2006 World Championships.

== Playing career ==
=== Minor ===
Auld played most of his minor hockey in his hometown of Thunder Bay, Ontario, with the Thunder Bay Kings program. He was a minor hockey teammate of future NHLers Taylor Pyatt, Patrick Sharp, Jason Jaspers and Aaron MacKenzie. Their Kings team won gold in the All Ontario Bantam AAA championships in 1997 played in North Bay, Ontario.

=== Junior ===
Auld started junior career with the North Bay Centennials of the Ontario Hockey League (OHL) at the tail end of the 1997–98 season, appearing in six games without registering a win. After appearing in 38 games the following season, Auld was selected in the second round, 40th overall, of the 1999 NHL entry draft by the Florida Panthers. He would finish out his junior career with the Centennials, spending two more seasons as their starting goaltender. In his final season, Auld was named to Team Canada for the 2001 World Junior Ice Hockey Championships, where he backed up Maxime Ouellet, winning a bronze medal. Later that same season, Auld was traded to the Vancouver Canucks for a third round pick in the 2002 NHL entry draft and a compensatory pick in the 2001 NHL entry draft.

=== Professional ===
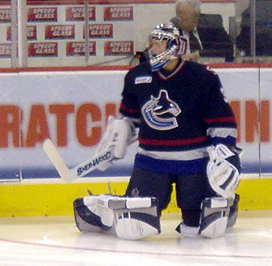
Alex Auld during his tenure with Vancouver

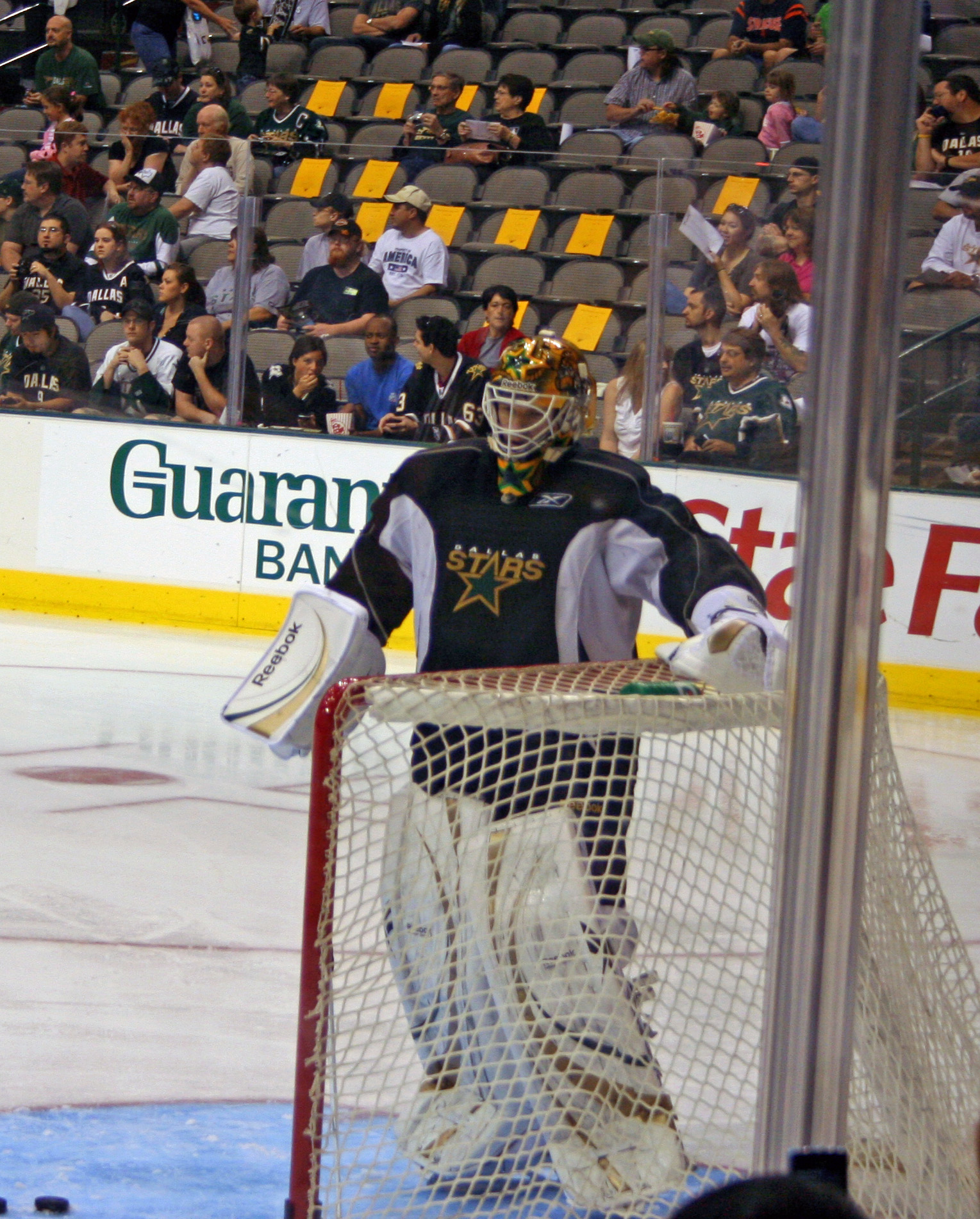
Auld during his time with the Dallas Stars

Auld turned professional in the 2001–02 season, joining the Canucks' American Hockey League (AHL) affiliate, the Manitoba Moose. An ankle sprain sidelined Auld during training camp, however, and upon his return, he was assigned to the Columbia Inferno of the East Coast Hockey League. Solid play in six games at that level returned Auld to the AHL, where he showed steady improvement, despite competition for playing time from veterans Alfie Michaud and Martin Brochu. Following injuries to Canucks goaltenders Dan Cloutier and Peter Skudra, Auld earned a start at the NHL level, a 4–2 victory over the Dallas Stars on January 23, 2002, after which he returned to the AHL. The 2002–03 season afforded Auld more opportunity for growth, although he again split playing time at the AHL level, this time with Tyler Moss. With Cloutier and Skudra entrenched at the NHL level, Auld still managed to appear in seven games as an injury replacement, and even played one Stanley Cup playoff game in relief. In his fourth career start, Auld notched his first career shutout versus the Washington Capitals on March 23, 2003.

During the off-season, backup Peter Skudra signed with a Russian team, raising the possibility that Auld might claim the backup role for the Canucks. As the 2003–04 season approached, however, Canucks general manager Brian Burke traded a draft pick to the Pittsburgh Penguins for Johan Hedberg, all but ensuring Auld another season in the minors. Again, Auld began the season sharing netminding duties with Tyler Moss. Auld again saw brief NHL action, appearing in six games. However, during the 2004 Stanley Cup playoffs, Cloutier was injured early on in the Canucks' first round series with the Calgary Flames. Hedberg, who had been shaky as a backup, failed to impress head coach Marc Crawford in two appearances, and Auld claimed the starting role in Game 5, pushing Calgary the distance in the series, eventually losing in Game 7.

Auld spent the 2004–05 NHL lockout back with the Manitoba Moose in the AHL, this time pairing with veteran netminder Wade Flaherty. Despite holding on to the starting role for much of the season, Flaherty took over as starter at the beginning of the Calder Cup playoffs, helping the team reach the third round. Auld also appeared for Canada at the Spengler Cup in December 2004, carrying the team to a third-place finish.

Auld returned to the NHL when play resumed for the 2005–06 season, initially as the backup to Cloutier. However, on November 20, 2005, Cloutier injured an anterior cruciate ligament (ACL) in a collision with Mighty Ducks of Anaheim forward Rob Niedermayer. The hope initially was that the injury would heal during the season, but on December 13, Cloutier opted for surgery, leaving Auld as Vancouver's starting goaltender. He would not play in another game for the Moose, leaving the AHL team as its franchise leader in wins and shutouts.

As the Canucks' starter, Auld was reunited with former World Junior teammate Maxime Ouellet, who was one of three goaltenders the Canucks used to back him up (Mika Noronen and Rob McVicar were the others). Filling in admirably, Auld went on to capture the Cyclone Taylor trophy as team MVP, although the Canucks would miss the playoffs. Auld then joined Team Canada again, this time at the 2006 World Championships, where Canada finished a disappointing fourth, losing the bronze medal game to Finland.

In June 2006, Auld was involved in a multi-player trade that sent him, Todd Bertuzzi and Bryan Allen to Florida in exchange for Roberto Luongo, Lukáš Krajíček and a sixth-round draft pick. Initially, Auld was expected to be the undisputed starter in Florida. However, the July 25 signing of Ed Belfour introduced some competition, and Belfour eventually won the job as starting goalie. Controversially, in October, Auld was hospitalized while "horsing around" with Belfour, with suspicions that Belfour had assaulted him.

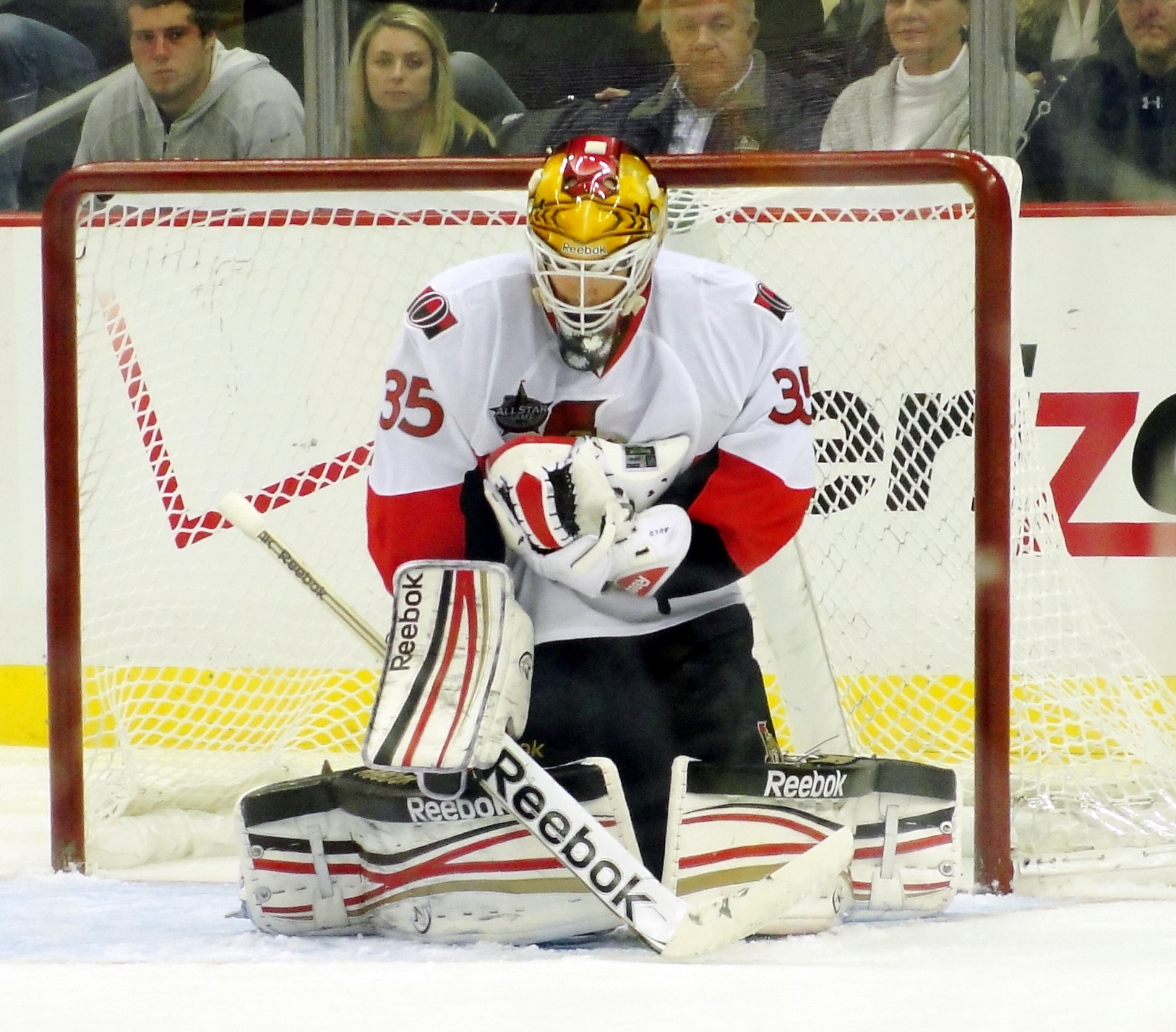
Auld with the Senators in 2011

After an unsuccessful season with Florida, Auld signed a one-year contract with the Phoenix Coyotes on August 13, 2007. However, on a team with already with a wealth of goaltenders — Auld would compete for a job with David Aebischer and Mikael Tellqvist at the beginning of the season — Phoenix would pick up Ilya Bryzgalov off waivers from the Anaheim Ducks, leaving Auld as one of the odd goaltenders out. After nine appearances with Phoenix, on December 6, 2007, Auld was traded to the Boston Bruins for right winger Nate DiCasmirro and the Bruins' fifth-round pick in 2009. Playing backup to Tim Thomas for the majority of 2007–08, he played well for the Bruins, especially after an injury sidelined Thomas.

On July 1, 2008, Auld signed a two-year, $2 million deal with the Ottawa Senators as an unrestricted free agent. He came within one second of recording a shutout in his Senators debut against the Pittsburgh Penguins in Stockholm, Sweden, surrendering a powerplay goal in the final moments of the game. Though Senators' management expected him to serve primarily as a backup to Martin Gerber, Auld's strong play combined with Gerber's struggles resulted in Auld assuming the starting position early in the season. As the season progressed, Gerber was placed on waivers and ultimately was claimed by the Toronto Maple Leafs, while rookie Brian Elliott would split the goaltending duties with Auld in Ottawa. He was expected to challenge for the starting position in 2009–10 with Pascal Leclaire, acquired by Ottawa from the Columbus Blue Jackets late at the 2008–09 trade deadline, but was traded in the off-season on July 8, 2009, to the Dallas Stars in exchange for a sixth-round draft pick in 2010. During the season he struggled with the Stars and with Marty Turco and Kari Lehtonen in net for Dallas, Auld again was the odd man out and was placed on waivers and assigned to the AHL's Texas Stars on February 25, 2010.

However, on February 27, 2010, Auld was claimed off re-entry waivers by the New York Rangers. The Rangers had sought a veteran backup for Henrik Lundqvist after using two inexperienced goalies for the majority of the season. An unrestricted free agent at the end of the season, on July 1, 2010, he signed a one-year, $1 million contract with the Montreal Canadiens as backup to Carey Price, replacing Jaroslav Halák who had been traded to St. Louis. He finished the season with a 6–2–2 record, a 2.64 goals against average and a .914 save percentage. Again an unrestricted free agent at season's end, on July 1, 2011, Auld re-joined the Ottawa Senators, signing a one-year, $1 million contract, replacing Curtis McElhinney as backup to Craig Anderson.

On July 23, 2012, Auld left the NHL and signed as a free agent with Austrian club Red Bull Salzburg of the Austrian Hockey League (EBEL). He retired from hockey at the end of the season.

== International play ==
Auld first played for Team Canada at the junior level in the 2001 World Junior Championships helping claim the bronze medal. He made a senior competitive debut with Team Canada at the Swiss-based 2004 Spengler Cup, finishing in 3rd place. He made his full IIHF debut for Canada at the 2006 World Championships, losing the bronze medal game to place fourth.

== Post-playing career ==
Auld became a broadcaster with Sportsnet 650 in Vancouver following his retirement, working weekend Canucks games for the station.

== Personal life ==
Auld was born in Cold Lake, Alberta, when his father was stationed out of CFB Cold Lake; however, he spent the majority of his adolescence in Thunder Bay, Ontario. Auld's wife is celebrity handbag and jewellery designer Melanie Auld. The couple have two children together. The couple splits their time between Vancouver and Thunder Bay.

== Career statistics ==
			Regular season										Playoffs
Season	Team	League	GP	W	L	T	OT	MIN	GA	SO	GAA	SV%	GP	W	L	MIN	GA	SO	GAA	SV%
1997–98	Sturgeon Falls Lynx	NOJHL	11	4	6	0	—	611	46	0	4.52	—	—	—	—	—	—	—	—	—
1997–98	North Bay Centennials	OHL	6	0	4	0	—	206	17	0	4.95	.872	—	—	—	—	—	—	—	—
1998–99	North Bay Centennials	OHL	37	9	20	1	—	1894	106	1	3.36	.899	3	0	3	170	10	0	3.53	—
1999–00	North Bay Centennials	OHL	55	21	26	6	—	3047	167	2	3.29	.891	6	2	4	374	12	0	1.93	.950
2000–01	North Bay Centennials	OHL	40	22	11	5	—	2319	98	1	2.54	.917	4	0	4	240	15	0	3.75	.883
2001–02	Columbia Inferno	ECHL	6	3	1	2	—	375	12	0	1.92	.927	—	—	—	—	—	—	—	—
2001–02	Manitoba Moose	AHL	21	11	9	0	—	1104	65	1	3.53	.881	1	0	0	20	0	0	0.00	1.000
2001–02	Vancouver Canucks	NHL	1	1	0	0	—	60	2	0	2.00	.909	—	—	—	—	—	—	—	—
2002–03	Manitoba Moose	AHL	37	15	19	3	—	2209	97	3	2.64	.908	—	—	—	—	—	—	—	—
2002–03	Vancouver Canucks	NHL	7	3	3	0	—	382	10	1	1.57	.939	1	0	0	20	1	0	3.00	.800
2003–04	Manitoba Moose	AHL	40	18	16	4	—	2329	99	4	2.55	.915	—	—	—	—	—	—	—	—
2003–04	Vancouver Canucks	NHL	6	2	2	2	—	348	12	0	2.07	.929	3	1	2	222	9	0	2.43	.898
2004–05	Manitoba Moose	AHL	50	25	18	4	—	2763	118	2	2.56	.909	3	0	2	128	7	0	3.29	.860
2005–06	Vancouver Canucks	NHL	67	33	26	—	6	3859	189	0	2.94	.902	—	—	—	—	—	—	—	—
2006–07	Florida Panthers	NHL	27	7	13	—	5	1470	82	1	3.34	.888	—	—	—	—	—	—	—	—
2007–08	Phoenix Coyotes	NHL	9	3	6	—	0	508	30	1	3.54	.880	—	—	—	—	—	—	—	—
2007–08	San Antonio Rampage	AHL	2	1	1	—	0	119	5	1	2.53	.906	—	—	—	—	—	—	—	—
2007–08	Boston Bruins	NHL	23	9	7	—	5	1213	47	2	2.32	.919	—	—	—	—	—	—	—	—
2008–09	Ottawa Senators	NHL	43	16	18	—	7	2449	101	1	2.47	.911	—	—	—	—	—	—	—	—
2009–10	Dallas Stars	NHL	21	9	6	—	0	1181	59	0	3.00	.894	—	—	—	—	—	—	—	—
2009–10	New York Rangers	NHL	3	0	1	—	0	119	5	0	2.53	.904	—	—	—	—	—	—	—	—
2010–11	Montreal Canadiens	NHL	16	6	2	—	2	749	33	0	2.64	.914	—	—	—	—	—	—	—	—
2011–12	Ottawa Senators	NHL	14	2	4	—	2	645	36	0	3.35	.884	—	—	—	—	—	—	—	—
2012–13	EC Red Bull Salzburg	EBEL	16	—	—	—	—	844	46	1	3.27	.892	—	—	—	—	—	—	—	—
NHL totals			237	91	88	2	30	12,985	606	6	2.80	.904	4	1	2	242	10	0	2.48	.892

== Awards and honours ==
- OHL Second All-Rookie Team - 1999
- OHL Third All-Star Team - 2001
- Cyclone Taylor Trophy (Vancouver Canucks MVP) - 2006
- Molson Cup (Vancouver Canucks three-star selection leader) - 2006
