= Leon Draisaitl =

German ice hockey player (born 1995)

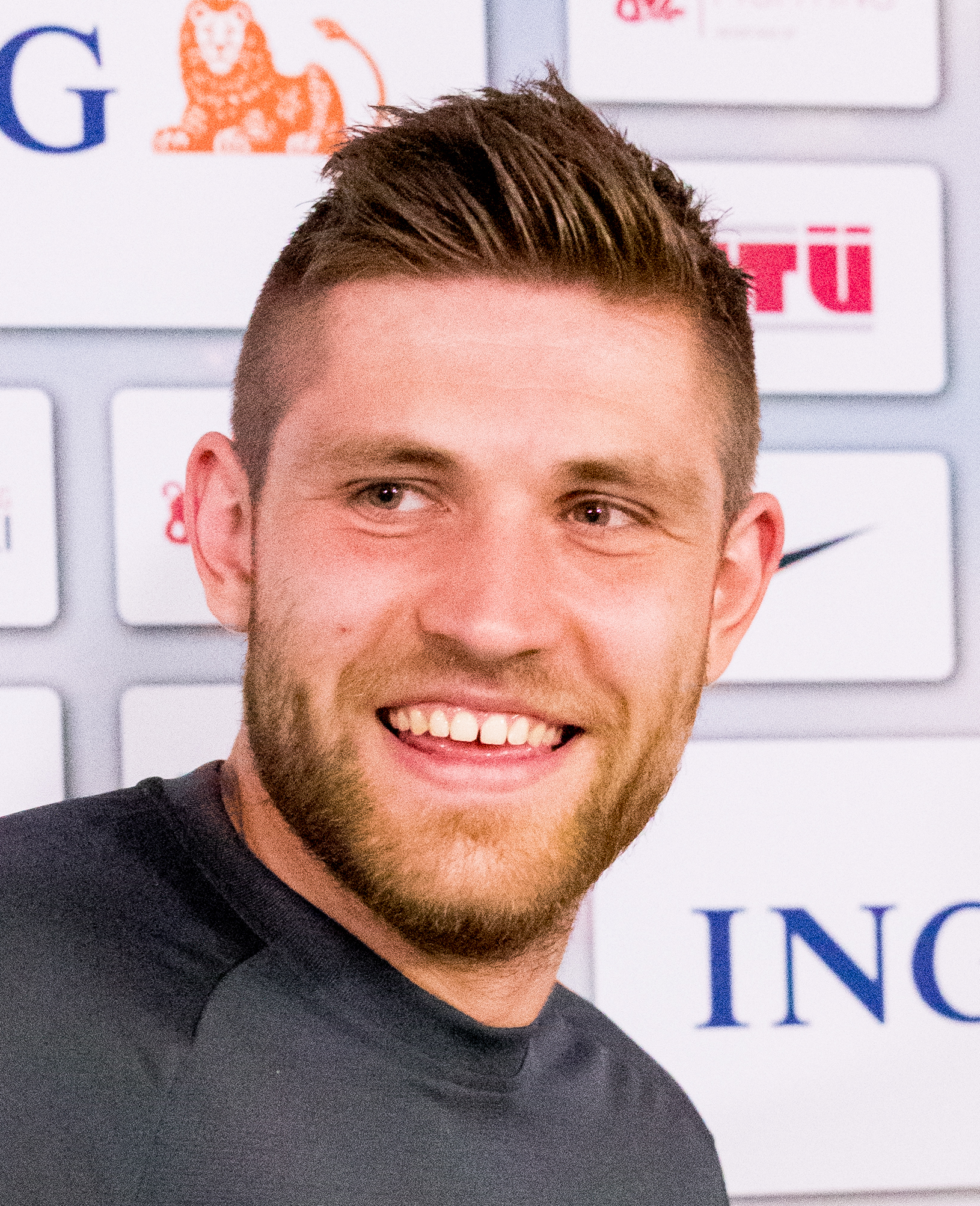
- Draisaitl in July 2019
- Born: 27 October 1995 (age 31) Cologne, Germany
- Height: 6 ft 3 in (191 cm)
- Weight: 215 lb (98 kg; 15 st 5 lb)
- Position: Forward
- Shoots: Left
- NHL team: Edmonton Oilers
- National team: Germany
- NHL draft: 3rd overall, 2014; Edmonton Oilers
- Playing career: 2014–present

Leon Tim Draisaitl (German: [ˈleːɔn ˈdʁaɪ̯ˌzaɪ̯tl̩]; born 27 October 1995) is a German professional ice hockey player who is a forward and alternate captain for the Edmonton Oilers of the National Hockey League (NHL). In 2020, Draisaitl became the first German player to win the Art Ross Trophy as the leading point scorer in the NHL, the Hart Memorial Trophy as regular season MVP, and the Ted Lindsay Award for most outstanding player. He also won the Maurice "Rocket" Richard Trophy as the league-leading goal-scorer in 2025, while also being the runner-up for the award in 2019 and 2022 and being the Art Ross Trophy runner-up in 2021 and 2023. These accolades have made Draisaitl become widely known as one of the best players in the NHL.

Draisaitl is the son of former Czech born Germany national team player Peter Draisaitl, who represented West Germany and Germany in 146 games, including at World Championships, the World Cup, and at 1988, 1992, and 1998 Olympic Winter Games.

Draisaitl was selected second overall in the 2012 CHL Import Draft by the Prince Albert Raiders. After two seasons with the Raiders, he was drafted third overall by the Edmonton Oilers in the 2014 NHL entry draft.

== Early life ==
Draisaitl was born on 27 October 1995 in Cologne, Germany, to Peter and Sandra Draisaitl. When he was a child, Draisaitl's father played ice hockey for the Kölner Haie of the Deutsche Eishockey Liga and appeared in three Winter Olympics with the Germany national team. Draisaitl played many sports as a child, including association football, but was most interested in ice hockey. As an adolescent, Draisaitl played with the Kölner Haie under-16 team and the Adler Mannheim under-18 team while skating on the side with the Ravensburg Towerstars, a team his father coached. During the 2011–12 German Development League (Deutsche Nachwuchsliga) season, Draisaitl recorded 21 goals and 56 points in 35 games for Jungadler Mannheim and was named the league's Player of the Year.

== Playing career ==
=== Major junior ===
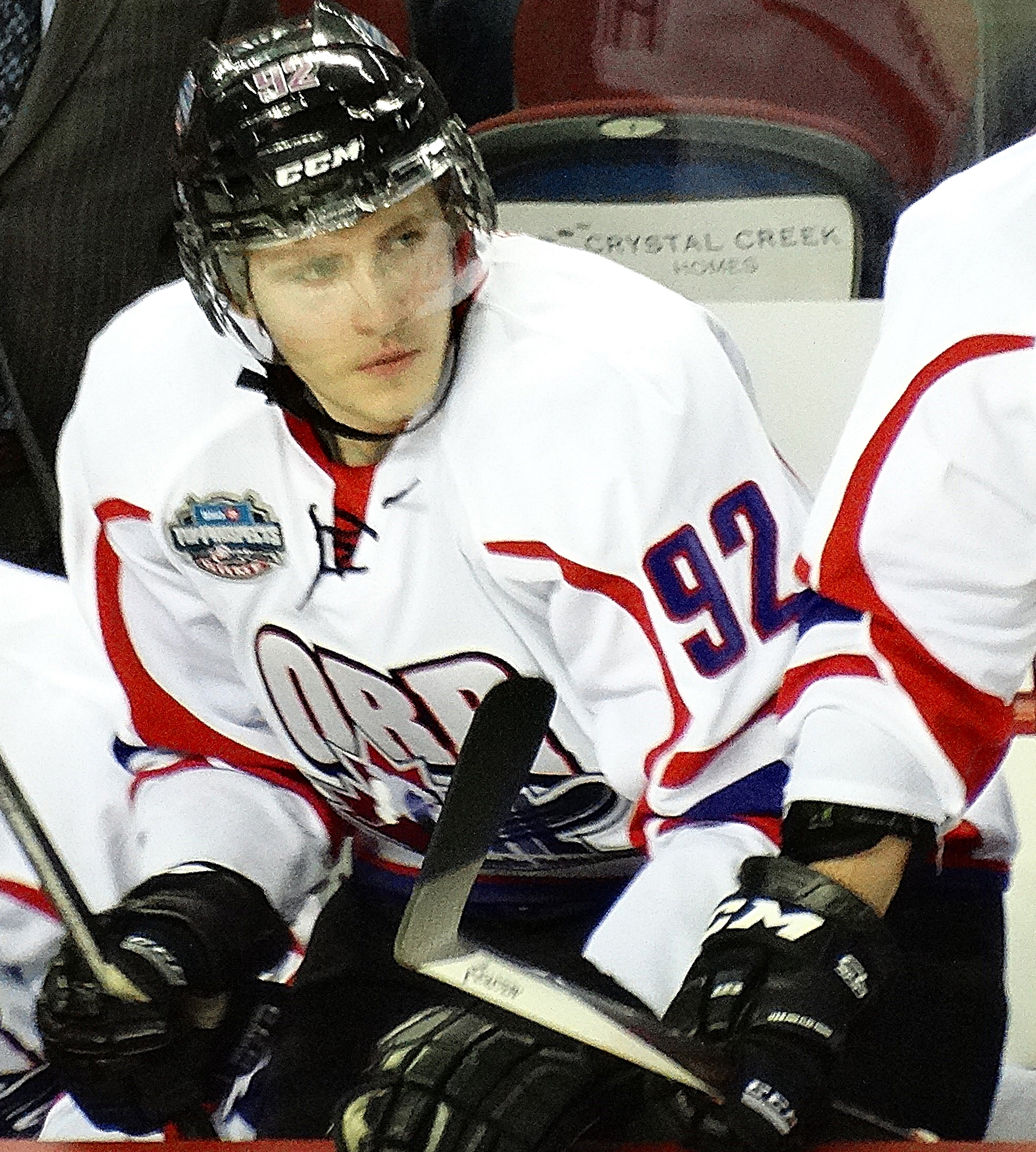
Draisaitl in January 2014 at the 2014 CHL's Top Prospects Game

Coming off his Player of the Year season in the German Development League, Draisaitl was selected second overall in the 2012 CHL Import Draft by the Prince Albert Raiders of the Western Hockey League (WHL).

Draisaitl was traded to the Kelowna Rockets during the 2015 World Junior Championships, the trade made official on 5 January. Draisaitl helped the Rockets to the 2015 WHL Championship, where he was named playoff MVP after scoring 28 points in 19 games. Draisaitl won the Stafford Smythe Trophy as Memorial Cup MVP the same year, although the Rockets did not win the 2015 Memorial Cup, losing the championship final in overtime 2–1 to the Oshawa Generals.

=== Professional (2014–present) ===
==== 2014–2016: NHL debut ====
Draisaitl was drafted third overall in the 2014 NHL entry draft by the Edmonton Oilers, making him the highest-drafted German-trained player in NHL history (Dany Heatley, selected second overall in 2000, was born in Germany but raised in Canada). On 12 August 2014, Draisaitl signed a three-year, entry-level contract with Edmonton. Making the Oilers' NHL opening night roster out of training camp, Draisaitl made his NHL debut in the 2014–15 season opener on 9 October, against the Oilers inner-provincial rival Calgary Flames, which ended with the Oilers losing 5–2. He scored his first NHL goal on 24 October, against Carolina Hurricanes goaltender Anton Khudobin as the Oilers would defeat the Hurricanes 6–3. Draisaitl appeared in 37 games for the Oilers for the first half of the 2014–15 season, recording two goals and seven assists for nine points, before being returned to the Prince Albert Raiders. The move was made on 4 January 2015 partly to prevent Draisaitl from moving one year closer to free agency which he would have done in July 2015 had he been on the Oilers' roster for more than 40 NHL games).

During the last Oilers game of the 2015–16 season at Rexall Place on 6 April 2016, Draisaitl scored the last NHL goal to be scored there in a 6–2 win over the Vancouver Canucks.

==== 2016–present: Rise to stardom, Hart Trophy, Stanley Cup Final runs ====
The 2016–17 season saw both Draisaitl and the Oilers reach new levels of success. On 23 March 2017, he became the first Oiler player since 1990 to have six straight multi-point games. Draisaitl finished the season with 29 goals, 48 assists and 77 points in all 82 games played, while the Oilers, powered by new captain Connor McDavid and Draisaitl, ended a 10-year playoff drought and clinched a berth in the 2017 playoffs by finishing second in the Pacific Division. Facing the San Jose Sharks in the first round, Draisaitl scored his first NHL playoff goal in the Oilers' series-clinching 3–1 game 6 win. The Oilers advanced into the second round to meet the Anaheim Ducks. With the Oilers down 3–2 in the series and on the brink of elimination in game 6 of the series on 7 May, Draisaitl became the second youngest Oiler in franchise history to score a hat-trick in the Stanley Cup playoffs and the fifth player in Oilers history to score five or more points in a playoff game, helping the team stave off elimination and force game 7. The Oilers subsequently were eliminated in a 2–1 loss in game 7, with Draisaitl's thwarted attempt at a tying goal midway through the third period was dubbed the "save of the game" by the NHL. He ended his first playoffs with six goals and 10 assists for 16 points in all 13 games played.

On 16 August 2017, Draisaitl signed an eight-year, $68 million contract extension with the Oilers worth an annual average cap hit of $8.5 million. The signing was controversial at the time in terms of the dollar figure, but it would rapidly in the following years come to be seen as one of the best-value contracts in the league as Draisaitl further developed into a star forward. Following the playoff success in 2017, expectations were high for the Oilers entering the 2017–18, but it would prove to be a disappointing year both for the team and for Draisaitl himself. He sustained a concussion on October 9, in a 5–2 loss to the Winnipeg Jets after a hit from Jets’ defenseman Jacob Trouba, causing him to miss the next four games, and correspondingly saw his scoring slightly regress after returning, which caused the Toronto Star to dub him "maddeningly inconsistent." The team crashed down the standings and missed the playoffs, with the decision-making of general manager Peter Chiarelli increasingly being called into question.

The 2018–19 season saw further disappointments for the team. A 9–10–1 start saw Chiarelli relieve coach Todd McLellan halfway into the season in January 2019, but successor Ken Hitchcock fared no better with a 14–14–2 record by mid-January. After continued losses, Chiarelli was himself sacked. In the midst of this, however, Draisaitl had a new career-best season in point production. In the Oilers' final game of the year on 6 April 2019, Draisaitl became the sixth Oiler (and the first since Craig Simpson in 1987–88) to score at least 50 goals in a season and the ninth Oiler to score at least 100 points in an NHL season, and finished the season with 55 assists and 105 points in all 82 games with his 50 goals being the runner up (behind the 51 goals scored by Washington Capitals captain Alexander Ovechkin) for the Maurice "Rocket" Richard Trophy. In the off-season, Ken Holland was hired as the team's new general manager.

Having already hit new milestones in scoring and increasingly recognized as one of the league's best players, the 2019–20 season would see further improvements for Draisaitl, as he for the first time eclipsed teammate McDavid in point production and was named alternate captain. By the time the onset of the COVID-19 pandemic prematurely ended the regular season in March 2020, Draisaitl had notched 43 goals and a league-leading 67 assists and 110 points in 71 games played. Before the last three weeks got cancelled due to pandemic lockdowns, he had been on pace to challenge Tampa Bay Lightning winger Nikita Kucherov's modern era record 128-point regular season from the previous year and on pace for another 50+ goal season and a 70+ assist season. Notwithstanding that disappointment, the 110 points he had managed were the best of any player that season, securing him the Art Ross Trophy as the leading scorer for the year. He was the third Oilers player (after Wayne Gretzky and McDavid) and the first German player to achieve that distinction. He was subsequently also awarded the Hart Memorial Trophy, awarded by the Professional Hockey Writers' Association to the league's most valuable player, and Ted Lindsay Award, voted on by the NHL Players' Association for the league's most outstanding player. When the NHL returned to play that July for the 2020 playoffs, to be held in a bubble in Toronto and Edmonton, Draisaitl was one of 31 skaters that the Oilers took into their quarantine bubble. As the fifth-ranked team in the Western Conference at the time of the halt to the regular season, the Oilers played in a best-of-five qualifying round against the 12th seeded Chicago Blackhawks, a team they had been expected to beat since the bubble was at their home arena and the Blackhawks weren't originally supposed to be in the playoffs and only were in due to the expanded format while the Oilers were one of the 16 teams in the league that would've been in the 2020 playoffs regardless. However, the team's offense struggled, noticeably lacking in scoring from players other than the top trio of Draisaitl, McDavid, and Ryan Nugent-Hopkins, and was eliminated 3–1 in the series by the Blackhawks. Draisaitl managed three goals and three assists for six points in four postseason games.

In light of pandemic restrictions on cross-border travel, the NHL temporarily realigned its structure for the 2020–21 season, with all Canadian teams playing in the North Division and interdivisional play suspended. Draisaitl and the Oilers enjoyed a strong season in this new format, though following his dominant prior season Draisaitl was now considered by many to again be operating in McDavid's shadow. On 31 January 2021, Draisaitl recorded six assists in the 8–5 win against the Ottawa Senators, becoming the first Oilers' player since Paul Coffey on 14 March 1986 to record a six-assist game. With 31 goals and 53 assists in 56 games, Draisaitl finished second in league scoring, distantly behind McDavid, whose historic season saw him score 105 points (33 goals, 72 assists) in all 56 games. The Oilers advanced into the 2021 playoffs for a series against the Winnipeg Jets. They were unexpectedly swept by the Jets in the first round, with Draisaitl recording two goals and three assists for five points in the four-game series.

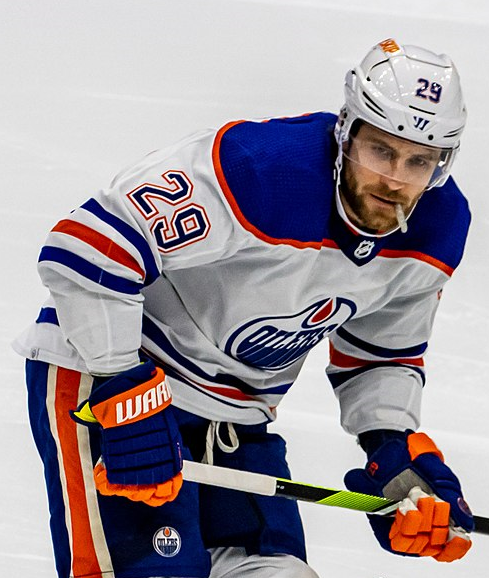
Draisaitl with the Edmonton Oilers in March 2023.

While the Oilers started the 2021–22 season with a franchise-best 9–1 record, Draisaitl and McDavid became the first pair of Edmonton teammates to individually reach 20 points within the first 10 games of the season since Wayne Gretzky and Jari Kurri in 1984–85. Draisaitl scored 20 goals in his first 19 games, and lead the league in goal-scoring for much of the year, though he was ultimately overtaken in the race for the Rocket Richard Trophy by the Toronto Maple Leafs' Auston Matthews. After an excellent start to the season, both the Oilers and Draisaitl began suffering a marked decline in results, culminating in a 2–11–2 stretch of games in December and January. By early February they had dropped out of a playoff spot. Amidst extensive media discussion of the Oilers' lack of depth scoring and questionable goaltending, general manager Holland fired coach Dave Tippett and replaced him with Jay Woodcroft, previously the coach of the Oilers AHL affiliate Bakersfield Condors. The Oilers recovered their form under Woodcroft, finishing the season in second place in the Pacific Division to qualify for the playoffs after posting the third-best points percentage in the league after the coaching change with a 26–9–3 record. Draisaitl, meanwhile, continued to set new milestones, hitting the 50-goal mark for the second time in his career in a 3 April game against the Anaheim Ducks. His 50th goal was also his 100th point, reaching that mark for the third time. He then notched a new team record for power play goals in a 12 April victory over the Minnesota Wild. Ultimately he finished the regular season with a new high in goals (55) and tied his career-best 110 points. The Oilers advanced in the 2022 playoffs to meet the Los Angeles Kings, seen as favourites to advance beyond the first round for only the second time in Draisaitl's career. The series proved to be a tough contest, and the Oilers were down 3–2 going into game 6 in Los Angeles. The team avoided elimination, but in the course of the game Draisaitl sustained a high ankle sprain in a scrum with Kings defenceman Mikey Anderson. Draisaitl dressed for game 7 and played over 22 minutes despite what many remarked on as limited mobility, helping the Oilers win the series and recording one assist. Due to his injury and resultant mobility issues, Draisaitl was primarily employed as a winger in the following games. The Oilers drew the Calgary Flames in the second round, the first playoff "Battle of Alberta" in 31 years. In the series against the Flames, Draisaitl set a playoff record of five straight games with three points or more, and by the close of the series was tied with McDavid for the playoff points lead with 26. After recording 17 points in five games, Draisaitl broke the Battle of Alberta record for most points in a series. In addition, Draisaitl became the fourth fastest player in NHL history to record 50 playoff points. The Oilers advanced to the Western Conference final for the first time since 2006. The Oilers were defeated by the top-seeded and eventual Stanley Cup champion Colorado Avalanche in a four-game sweep, bringing their postseason to an end. Draisaitl was credited with a strong performance through the series, including recording four primary assists in game 4 in a failed bid to avoid elimination when the Oilers lost 6–5 in overtime. He was visibly in pain from his leg injury for much of the series. After the conclusion of the playoffs, the Oilers confirmed that he had been playing through a high ankle sprain since game 6 of the first round.

On 5 April 2024, Draisaitl recorded his 500th NHL assist on a Connor McDavid goal in a 6–2 victory over the Colorado Avalanche. Draisaitl finished the season with 41 goals, 65 assists and 106 points in 81 games. In the 2024 playoffs, Draisaitl helped the Oilers defeat the Los Angeles Kings in the opening round for the third straight season along with the Vancouver Canucks and Dallas Stars in rounds two and three, respectively. This resulted in the Oilers clinching their first appearance in the Stanley Cup Final for the first time since 2006, which ultimately resulted in their defeat to the Florida Panthers in seven games, one win short from winning the Stanley Cup.

On 3 September 2024, Draisaitl signed an eight-year, $112 million contract extension to stay with the Oilers with an annual salary of $14 million until the 2032–33 season. At the time, it was the richest contract in league history. Oilers new general manager Stan Bowman, (who had been hired by the Oilers earlier in the 2024 off-season to replace Ken Holland who resigned after not being renewed a new contract himself), stated: "Leon's commitment to our team, our city and Oilers fans everywhere cannot be overstated. His desire to help bring a Stanley Cup title home to Edmonton is central to everything he does both on and off the ice." Draisaitl ended the 2024–25 season with 52 goals and 54 assists for 106 points in 71 games. His 52 goals earned him his first career Rocket Richard Trophy as the league's top goal-scorer and his 106 points ranked him tied with Boston Bruins forward David Pastrňák for third in the league in points only behind the 116 points by Colorado Avalanche's forward Nathan MacKinnon and the league-leading 121 points by Tampa Bay Lightning's forward Nikita Kucherov, respectively. He was named a Hart Trophy finalist for the second time with the Hart ultimately going to Winnipeg Jets goaltender Connor Hellebuyck. In the 2025 playoffs, Drasaitl and the Oilers would return to the Stanley Cup Final, again losing to the Panthers, this time in six games. For the playoffs, Draisaitl ended with 11 goals and 22 assists for 33 points in all 22 games.

On 15 March 2026, in a 3–1 win over the Nashville Predators, Draisaitl sustained an undisclosed lower-body injury after getting hit by Predators' forward Ozzy Wiesblatt, resulting in him missing the remainder of the 2025–26 season. Up to that point in the season, Draisaitl had 97 points (35 goals, 62 assists) in 65 games. Draisaitl returned for the first game of the 2026 playoffs and would lead the team in points that year. The Oilers would end up losing to the Anaheim Ducks in the first round of the playoffs in six games.

== International play ==
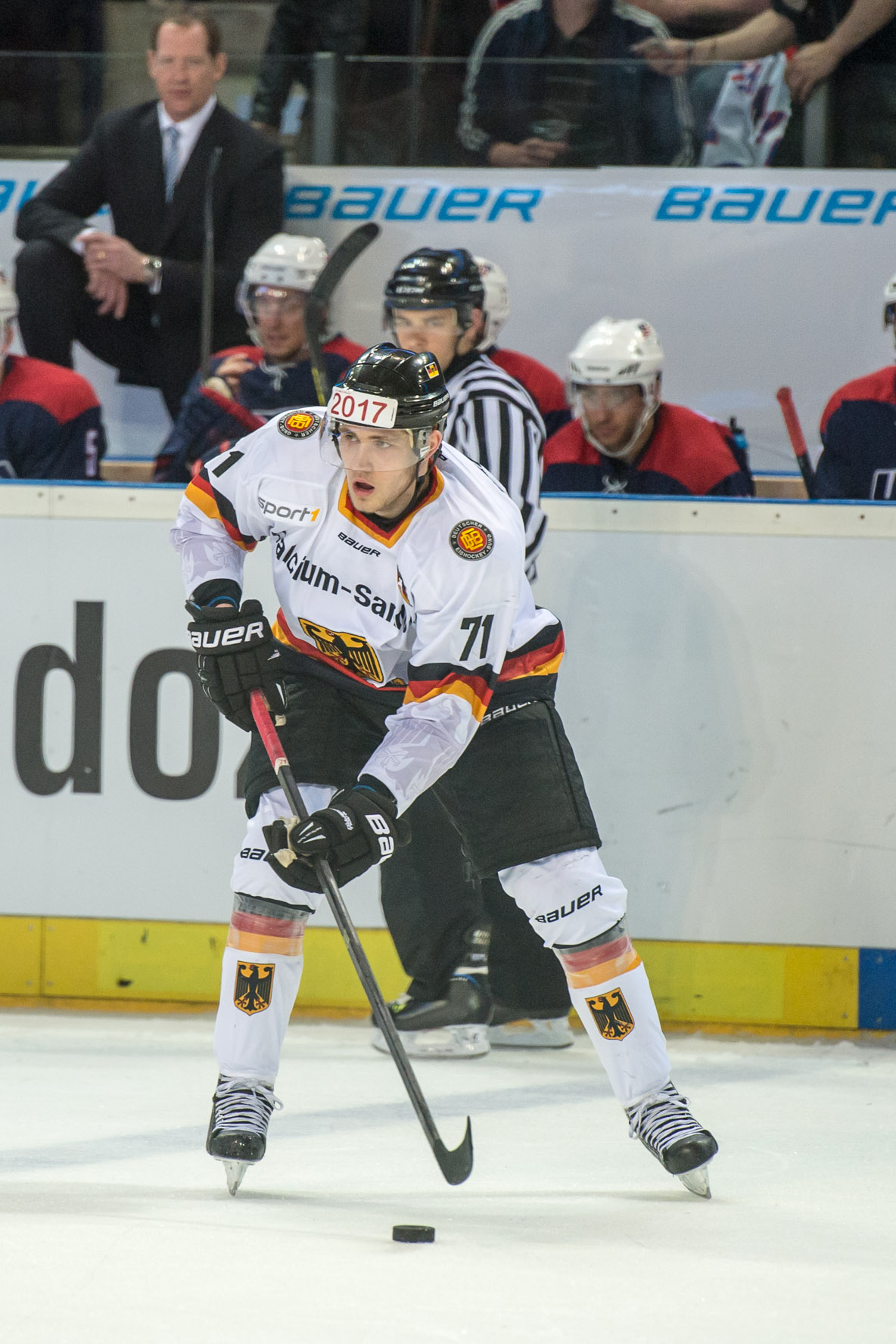
Draisaitl playing for Germany in 2014

Draisaitl represents Germany internationally. He played for the German junior team in the World Junior Championships in 2013 and 2014, serving as team captain in the latter tournament. In the 2014 tournament, he was ejected from a round-robin game against the United States after he committed a hit from behind and was later issued a one-game suspension.

Draisaitl was named to the German senior team roster for the 2014 World Championship, and also played in the 2018 World Championship.

Draisaitl made his Olympic debut at the 2026 Winter Olympics where he served as Germany's flag bearer alongside ski jumper Katharina Schmid. This marked the first Winter Olympics to feature NHL players in men's ice hockey since the 2014 Winter Olympics. In the 2026 tournament Germany reached to the quarterfinals where they lost 6–2 to Slovakia.

== Personal life ==
In 2018, Draisaitl began dating Canadian actress Celeste Desjardins after being set up with her by his teammate Connor McDavid's wife, Lauren Kyle McDavid who has been best friends with Desjardins since they were in high school together in Sudbury, Ontario.

Draisaitl and Desjardins announced their engagement on 11 July 2024, and were married on 3 August 2025.

Draisaitl's sister, Kim, is married to German field hockey player Niklas Wellen.

As of April 2020, Draisaitl's dog Bowie had its own Instagram account.

== Media ==
In 2021, Draisaitl became the first NHL player to sign with sportswear brand Puma. He is also sponsored by Warrior Sports, EA Sports and Skip the Dishes.

== Career statistics ==
=== Regular season and playoffs ===
Bold indicates led league

| | | | Regular season | | | | | Playoffs |
| Season | Team | League | GP | G | A | Pts | PIM | GP | G | A | Pts | PIM |
|---|---|---|---|---|---|---|---|---|---|---|---|---|
| 2010–11 | Jungadler Mannheim U18 | DNL | 6 | 0 | 1 | 1 | 2 | — | — | — | — | — |
| 2011–12 | Jungadler Mannheim U18 | DNL | 35 | 21 | 35 | 56 | 39 | 8 | 6 | 6 | 12 | 2 |
| 2012–13 | Prince Albert Raiders | WHL | 64 | 21 | 37 | 58 | 22 | 4 | 0 | 4 | 4 | 0 |
| 2013–14 | Prince Albert Raiders | WHL | 64 | 38 | 67 | 105 | 24 | 5 | 1 | 4 | 5 | 4 |
| 2014–15 | Edmonton Oilers | NHL | 37 | 2 | 7 | 9 | 4 | — | — | — | — | — |
| 2014–15 | Kelowna Rockets | WHL | 32 | 19 | 34 | 53 | 25 | 19 | 10 | 18 | 28 | 12 |
| 2015–16 | Bakersfield Condors | AHL | 6 | 1 | 1 | 2 | 4 | — | — | — | — | — |
| 2015–16 | Edmonton Oilers | NHL | 72 | 19 | 32 | 51 | 20 | — | — | — | — | — |
| 2016–17 | Edmonton Oilers | NHL | 82 | 29 | 48 | 77 | 20 | 13 | 6 | 10 | 16 | 19 |
| 2017–18 | Edmonton Oilers | NHL | 78 | 25 | 45 | 70 | 30 | — | — | — | — | — |
| 2018–19 | Edmonton Oilers | NHL | 82 | 50 | 55 | 105 | 52 | — | — | — | — | — |
| 2019–20 | Edmonton Oilers | NHL | 71 | 43 | **67** | **110** | 18 | 4 | 3 | 3 | 6 | 0 |
| 2020–21 | Edmonton Oilers | NHL | 56 | 31 | 53 | 84 | 22 | 4 | 2 | 3 | 5 | 2 |
| 2021–22 | Edmonton Oilers | NHL | 80 | 55 | 55 | 110 | 40 | 16 | 7 | **25** | 32 | 6 |
| 2022–23 | Edmonton Oilers | NHL | 80 | 52 | 76 | 128 | 24 | 12 | **13** | 5 | 18 | 10 |
| 2023–24 | Edmonton Oilers | NHL | 81 | 41 | 65 | 106 | 76 | 25 | 10 | 21 | 31 | 14 |
| 2024–25 | Edmonton Oilers | NHL | 71 | **52** | 54 | 106 | 34 | 22 | 11 | 22 | **33** | 6 |
| 2025–26 | Edmonton Oilers | NHL | 65 | 35 | 62 | 97 | 26 | 6 | 3 | 7 | 10 | 2 |
| NHL totals | | | 855 | 434 | 619 | 1,053 | 366 | 102 | 55 | 96 | 151 | 59 |

=== International ===
| Year | Team | Event | Result | GP | G | A | Pts | PIM |
|---|---|---|---|---|---|---|---|---|
| 2012 | Germany | U17 | 9th | 5 | 1 | 4 | 5 | 10 |
| 2012 | Germany | U18 | 6th | 6 | 2 | 5 | 7 | 2 |
| 2013 | Germany | U18 | 8th | 5 | 1 | 6 | 7 | 4 |
| 2013 | Germany | WJC | 9th | 6 | 2 | 4 | 6 | 2 |
| 2014 | Germany | WJC | 9th | 6 | 2 | 4 | 6 | 52 |
| 2014 | Germany | WC | 14th | 7 | 1 | 3 | 4 | 0 |
| 2016 | Germany | WC | 7th | 8 | 1 | 3 | 4 | 4 |
| 2016 | Germany | OGQ | Q | 3 | 2 | 3 | 5 | 0 |
| 2016 | Team Europe | WCH | 2nd | 6 | 2 | 0 | 2 | 0 |
| 2017 | Germany | WC | 8th | 3 | 0 | 2 | 2 | 2 |
| 2018 | Germany | WC | 11th | 7 | 2 | 7 | 9 | 16 |
| 2019 | Germany | WC | 6th | 8 | 5 | 3 | 8 | 0 |
| 2026 | Germany | OG | 6th | 5 | 2 | 5 | 7 | 0 |
| Junior totals | | | | 28 | 8 | 23 | 31 | 60 |
| Senior totals | | | | 47 | 15 | 26 | 41 | 22 |

== Awards and honours ==
| Award | Year | Ref |
DNL
| DNL Player of the Year | 2012 | |
CHL / WHL
| WHL First All-Star Team (East) | 2014 | |
| WHL Finals Most Valuable Player | 2015 | |
| Stafford Smythe Memorial Trophy | 2015 | |
| Ed Chynoweth Trophy | 2015 | |
NHL
| NHL All-Star Game | 2019, 2020, 2022, 2023, 2024 | |
| NHL All-Star Skills Competition Premier Passer Winner | 2019 | |
| NHL First All-Star Team | 2020 | |
| Art Ross Trophy | 2020 | |
| Ted Lindsay Award | 2020 | |
| Hart Memorial Trophy | 2020 | |
| NHL Second All-Star Team | 2023, 2025 | |
| Maurice "Rocket" Richard Trophy | 2025 | |
| Best NHL Player ESPY Award | 2025 | |
| Edmonton Oilers Quarter-Century Team | 2025 | |
| NHL Quarter-Century Team | 2025 | |
International
| IIHF All-Time Germany Team | 2020 | |
Other
| German Sportsman of the Year | 2020 | |

== Records ==
=== NHL ===
==== Regular Season ====
- Most overtime goals in a season (6, in 2024-25)

==== Postseason ====
- Most assists in a single period (4, in 2022)
- Most assists in a series (15, in 2022)
- Most consecutive 3-point games in a postseason (5, in 2022)
- Most overtime goals in a postseason (4, in 2025)

=== Edmonton Oilers ===
==== Regular Season ====
- Most assists in a period (4, tied with 5 others)
- Most power-play goals in a game (3, tied with 3 others)
- Most power-play goals in a season (32, in 2022–23)
- Most career power-play goals (178)
- Most career overtime goals (20)
- Most career 20-goal seasons (10, tied with 4 others)
- Most consecutive 20-goal seasons (10, tied with 3 others)

==== Postseason ====
- Most goals in a game (4, tied with 4 others)
- Longest assist streak (9 games, in 2022, tied with Glenn Anderson)
- Most career power-play goals (23, tied with Wayne Gretzky)
- Most career overtime goals (4)

Awards and achievements
| Preceded by Darnell Nurse | Edmonton Oilers first round draft pick 2014 | Succeeded by Connor McDavid |
| Preceded by Nikita Kucherov | Art Ross Trophy winner 2020 | Succeeded by Connor McDavid |
| Preceded by Nikita Kucherov | Ted Lindsay Award winner 2020 | Succeeded by Connor McDavid |
| Preceded by Nikita Kucherov | Hart Memorial Trophy winner 2020 | Succeeded by Connor McDavid |
| Preceded by Auston Matthews | Maurice "Rocket" Richard Trophy winner 2025 | Succeeded by Nathan MacKinnon |
