= NHL Quarter-Century teams =

National Hockey League honors for 2000–2024

NHL Quarter-Century Teams
- Sport: Ice hockey
- League: National Hockey League
- Awarded for: Best players of each team at each position across the first quarter of the 21st century, as voted by team media, retired players, and executives

History
- First award: 2024–25

The National Hockey League Quarter-Century teams were named during the 2024–25 NHL season, to honor the best performers of each franchise over the first 25 years of the 21st century. Each franchise's teams were selected by members of the media, retired players, and executives of that franchise. Following the individual team rosters' release from December 30, 2024 to January 31, 2025, a fan-voted overall NHL Quarter-Century team was revealed in May 2025.

== Key ==
†	Denotes a club who was not active for the full Quarter Century
‡	Denotes a club who changed identities over the Quarter Century
^	Denotes players who are still active in the NHL with their selected team
$	Denotes players who are still active in the NHL outside of their selected team
#	Denotes players who are still active outside of the NHL
*	Denotes players inducted into the Hockey Hall of Fame
⌑	Denotes inactive players not yet eligible for Hockey Hall of Fame consideration

== Selections ==
=== By franchise ===
==== Anaheim Ducks ====
Anaheim Ducks^{‡} (Note: Selections include players from the Mighty Ducks of Anaheim who changed their name on June 23, 2006.)
Position	First Team		Second Team	
Position	Player	Tenure	Player	Tenure
F	Corey Perry^{$}	2005–2019	Paul Kariya*	1994–2003
F	Ryan Getzlaf	2005–2022	Bobby Ryan	2007–2013
F	Teemu Selanne*	1995–2001; 2005–2014	Jakob Silfverberg^{#}	2013–2024
D	Scott Niedermayer*	2005–2010	Chris Pronger*	2006–2009
D	Cam Fowler^{$}	2010–2025	Francois Beauchemin	2005–2009; 2011–2015; 2017–2018
G	Jean-Sebastien Giguere	2000–2010	John Gibson^{$}	2013–2025

==== Arizona Coyotes ====
Arizona Coyotes^{†‡} (Note: Selections include players from the Phoenix Coyotes who changed their name on June 27, 2014. The Coyotes suspended operations on July 10, 2024.)
Position	First Team		Second Team	
Position	Player	Tenure	Player	Tenure
F	Shane Doan	1995–2017	Martin Hanzal	2007–2017
F	Clayton Keller^{$}	2017–2024	Jeremy Roenick*	1996–2001; 2006–2007
F	Radim Vrbata	2007–2008; 2009–2014; 2016–2017	Nick Schmaltz^{$}	2018–2024
D	Oliver Ekman-Larsson^{$}	2010–2021	Zbyněk Michálek	2005–2010; 2013–2015; 2015–2017
D	Keith Yandle	2006–2015	Teppo Numminen	1988–2003
G	Mike Smith	2011–2017	Ilya Bryzgalov	2007–2011

==== Boston Bruins ====
Boston Bruins
Position	First Team		Second Team	
Position	Player	Tenure	Player	Tenure
F	Patrice Bergeron*	2003–2023	Milan Lucic^{⌑}	2007–2015; 2023
F	David Krejčí	2007–2023	David Pastrňák^	2014–present
F	Brad Marchand^{$}	2009–2025	Joe Thornton*	1997–2005
D	Zdeno Chára*	2006–2020	Torey Krug^{⌑}	2012–2020
D	Charlie McAvoy^	2017–present	Dennis Seidenberg	2010–2016
G	Tim Thomas	2002–2003; 2006–2012	Tuukka Rask	2007–2022

==== Buffalo Sabres ====
Buffalo Sabres
Position	First Team		Second Team	
Position	Player	Tenure	Player	Tenure
F	Daniel Briere	2002–2007	Chris Drury	2003–2007
F	Jason Pominville	2003; 2005–2013; 2017–2019	Jack Eichel^{$}	2015–2021
F	Thomas Vanek	2005–2014	Derek Roy	2003–2012
D	Brian Campbell	1998–2008	Jay McKee	1995–2006
D	Rasmus Dahlin^	2018–present	Tyler Myers^{$}	2009–2015
G	Ryan Miller	2002–2014	Dominik Hašek*	1992–2001

==== Calgary Flames ====
Calgary Flames
Position	First Team		Second Team	
Position	Player	Tenure	Player	Tenure
F	Johnny Gaudreau^{⌑}	2014–2022	Mikael Backlund^	2009–present
F	Jarome Iginla*	1996–2013	Craig Conroy	2001–2004; 2007–2010
F	Matthew Tkachuk^{$}	2016–2022	Sean Monahan^{$}	2013–2022
D	Mark Giordano^{⌑}	2006–2021	Rasmus Andersson^{$}	2017–2026
D	Robyn Regehr	1999–2011	Dion Phaneuf	2005–2010
G	Miikka Kiprusoff	2003–2013	Jacob Markström^{$}	2021–2024

==== Carolina Hurricanes ====
Carolina Hurricanes
Position	First Team		Second Team	
Position	Player	Tenure	Player	Tenure
F	Sebastian Aho^	2016–present	Ron Francis*	1981–1991; 1998–2004
F	Rod Brind'Amour	2000–2010	Jordan Staal^	2013–present
F	Eric Staal	2003–2016	Justin Williams	2004–2009; 2017–2020
D	Jaccob Slavin^	2015–present	Justin Faulk^{$}	2011–2019
D	Glen Wesley	1995–2008	Bret Hedican	2002–2008
G	Cam Ward	2005–2018	Artūrs Irbe	1998–2004

==== Chicago Blackhawks ====
Chicago Blackhawks
Position	First Team		Second Team	
Position	Player	Tenure	Player	Tenure
F	Patrick Kane^{$}	2007–2023	Alex DeBrincat^{$}	2017–2022
F	Patrick Sharp	2005–2015; 2017–2018	Marián Hossa*	2009–2017
F	Jonathan Toews^{⌑}	2007–2023	Brandon Saad^{$}	2011–2015; 2017–2020
D	Duncan Keith*	2005–2021	Brian Campbell	2008–2011; 2016–2017
D	Brent Seabrook	2005–2019	Niklas Hjalmarsson^{⌑}	2008–2017
G	Corey Crawford	2006; 2008–2020	Jocelyn Thibault	1998–2003

==== Colorado Avalanche ====
Colorado Avalanche
Position	First Team		Second Team	
Position	Player	Tenure	Player	Tenure
F	Peter Forsberg*	1995–2004; 2008; 2011	Milan Hejduk	1998–2013
F	Nathan MacKinnon^	2013–present	Gabriel Landeskog^	2011–present
F	Joe Sakic*	1988–2008	Mikko Rantanen^{$}	2015–2025
D	Adam Foote	1991–2004; 2008–2011	Rob Blake*	2001–2006
D	Cale Makar^	2019–present	Erik Johnson^{⌑}	2011–2023; 2025
G	Patrick Roy*	1995–2003	Semyon Varlamov^{$}	2011–2019

==== Columbus Blue Jackets ====
Columbus Blue Jackets^{†} (Note: The Blue Jackets played their first game on October 7, 2000.)
Position	First Team		Second Team	
Position	Player	Tenure	Player	Tenure
F	Cam Atkinson^{⌑}	2011–2021	Nick Foligno^{$}	2013–2021
F	Rick Nash	2002–2012	Johnny Gaudreau^{⌑}	2022–2024
F	Artemi Panarin^{$}	2017–2019	Boone Jenner^{$}	2013–2026
D	Seth Jones^{$}	2016–2021	David Savard^{$}	2011–2021
D	Zach Werenski^	2016–present	Fedor Tyutin	2008–2016
G	Sergei Bobrovsky^{$}	2013–2019	Steve Mason	2008–2013

==== Dallas Stars ====
Dallas Stars
Position	First Team		Second Team	
Position	Player	Tenure	Player	Tenure
F	Jamie Benn^	2009–present	Brenden Morrow	1999–2013
F	Jere Lehtinen	1995–2010	Joe Pavelski^{⌑}	2019–2024
F	Mike Modano*	1989–2010	Tyler Seguin^	2013–present
D	Miro Heiskanen^	2018–present	John Klingberg^{$}	2014–2022
D	Sergei Zubov*	1996–2008	Esa Lindell^	2016–present
G	Marty Turco	2000–2010	Ed Belfour*	1997–2002

==== Detroit Red Wings ====
Detroit Red Wings
Position	First Team		Second Team	
Position	Player	Tenure	Player	Tenure
F	Pavel Datsyuk*	2001–2016	Sergei Fedorov*	1990–2003
F	Steve Yzerman*	1983–2006	Dylan Larkin^	2015–present
F	Henrik Zetterberg	2002–2018	Brendan Shanahan*	1996–2006
D	Niklas Kronwall	2003–2019	Chris Chelios*	1999–2009
D	Nicklas Lidström*	1991–2012	Brian Rafalski	2007–2011
G	Chris Osgood	1993–2001; 2005–2011	Dominik Hašek*	2001–2003; 2006–2008

==== Edmonton Oilers ====
Edmonton Oilers
Position	First Team		Second Team	
Position	Player	Tenure	Player	Tenure
F	Leon Draisaitl^	2014–present	Ales Hemsky	2002–2014
F	Connor McDavid^	2015–present	Shawn Horcoff	2000–2013
F	Ryan Nugent-Hopkins^	2011–present	Ryan Smyth	1995–2007; 2011–2014
D	Evan Bouchard^	2018; 2021–present	Mattias Ekholm^	2023–present
D	Darnell Nurse^{$}	2014–2026	Jason Smith	1999–2007
G	Dwayne Roloson	2006–2009	Tommy Salo	1999–2004

==== Florida Panthers ====
Florida Panthers
Position	First Team		Second Team	
Position	Player	Tenure	Player	Tenure
F	Aleksander Barkov^	2013–present	Pavel Bure*	1998–2002
F	Jonathan Huberdeau^{$}	2013–2022	Olli Jokinen	2000–2008
F	Matthew Tkachuk^	2022–present	Sam Reinhart^	2021–present
D	Aaron Ekblad^	2014–present	Jay Bouwmeester	2002–2009
D	Gustav Forsling^	2021–present	Robert Svehla	1995–2002
G	Roberto Luongo*	2000–2006; 2014–2019	Sergei Bobrovsky^{$}	2019–2026

==== Los Angeles Kings ====
Los Angeles Kings
Position	First Team		Second Team	
Position	Player	Tenure	Player	Tenure
F	Dustin Brown	2003–2022	Adrian Kempe^	2017–present
F	Jeff Carter^{⌑}	2012–2021	Ziggy Pálffy	1999–2004
F	Anže Kopitar^{⌑}	2006–present	Justin Williams	2009–2015
D	Drew Doughty^	2008–present	Mattias Norström	1996–2007
D	Alec Martinez^{⌑}	2009–2020	Ľubomír Višňovský	2000–2008
G	Jonathan Quick^{⌑}	2007–2023	Felix Potvin	2001–2003

==== Minnesota Wild ====
Minnesota Wild^{†} (Note: The Wild played their first game on October 6, 2000.)
Position	First Team		Second Team	
Position	Player	Tenure	Player	Tenure
F	Marián Gáborík	2000–2009	Andrew Brunette	2001–2004; 2008–2011
F	Kirill Kaprizov^	2021–present	Joel Eriksson Ek^	2016–present
F	Mikko Koivu	2005–2020	Zach Parise^{⌑}	2013–2021
D	Jonas Brodin^	2013–present	Nick Schultz	2001–2012
D	Jared Spurgeon^	2010–present	Ryan Suter^{$}	2013–2021
G	Niklas Bäckström	2006–2015	Devan Dubnyk	2015–2020

==== Montreal Canadiens ====
Montreal Canadiens
Position	First Team		Second Team	
Position	Player	Tenure	Player	Tenure
F	Saku Koivu	1995–2009	Brendan Gallagher^{$}	2013–2026
F	Alexei Kovalev	2004–2009	Max Pacioretty^{⌑}	2009–2018
F	Tomáš Plekanec^{⌑}	2003–2018; 2018	Nick Suzuki^	2019–present
D	Andrei Markov	2000–2017	Sheldon Souray	2000–2007
D	Shea Weber*	2016–2021	P. K. Subban	2010–2016
G	Carey Price	2007–2022	José Théodore	1996–2006

==== Nashville Predators ====
Nashville Predators
Position	First Team		Second Team	
Position	Player	Tenure	Player	Tenure
F	Mike Fisher	2011–2018	Ryan Johansen^{⌑}	2016–2023
F	Filip Forsberg^	2013–present	David Legwand	1999–2014
F	Paul Kariya*	2005–2007	Steve Sullivan	2004–2011
D	Roman Josi^	2019–present	Mattias Ekholm^{$}	2011; 2013–2023
D	Shea Weber*	2006–2016	Kimmo Timonen	1998–2007
G	Pekka Rinne*	2005–2006; 2008–2021	Juuse Saros^	2016–present

==== New Jersey Devils ====
New Jersey Devils
Position	First Team		Second Team	
Position	Player	Tenure	Player	Tenure
F	Patrik Eliáš	1995–2016	Scott Gomez	1999–2007; 2014–2015
F	Jack Hughes^	2019–present	Jamie Langenbrunner	2002–2011
F	Zach Parise^{⌑}	2005–2012	Travis Zajac	2006–2021
D	Scott Niedermayer*	1991–2004	Andy Greene	2007–2020
D	Scott Stevens*	1991–2004	Brian Rafalski	1999–2007
G	Martin Brodeur*	1992–2014	Cory Schneider	2013–2020

==== New York Islanders ====
New York Islanders
Position	First Team		Second Team	
Position	Player	Tenure	Player	Tenure
F	Josh Bailey	2008–2023	Brock Nelson^{$}	2013–2025
F	John Tavares^{$}	2009–2018	Mathew Barzal^	2017–present
F	Anders Lee^{$}	2013–2026	Frans Nielsen	2007–2016
D	Nick Leddy^{$}	2014–2021	Adam Pelech^	2016–present
D	Kenny Jonsson	1996–2004	Ryan Pulock^	2016–present
G	Ilya Sorokin^	2020–present	Semyon Varlamov^	2019–present

==== New York Rangers ====
New York Rangers
Position	First Team		Second Team	
Position	Player	Tenure	Player	Tenure
F	Chris Kreider^{$}	2012–2025	Jaromir Jagr^{#}	2004–2008
F	Artemi Panarin^{$}	2019–2026	Derek Stepan	2010–2017
F	Mika Zibanejad^	2016–present	Mats Zuccarello^{$}	2010–2019
D	Adam Fox^	2019–present	Dan Girardi	2007–2017
D	Ryan McDonagh^{$}	2011–2018	Marc Staal^{⌑}	2007–2020
G	Henrik Lundqvist*	2005–2020	Igor Shesterkin^	2020–present

==== Ottawa Senators ====
Ottawa Senators
Position	First Team		Second Team	
Position	Player	Tenure	Player	Tenure
F	Daniel Alfredsson*	1995–2013	Marián Hossa*	1997–2004
F	Dany Heatley	2005–2009	Mark Stone^{$}	2012–2019
F	Jason Spezza	2002–2014	Brady Tkachuk^{$}	2018–2026
D	Erik Karlsson^{$}	2009–2018	Zdeno Chára*	2001–2006
D	Wade Redden	1996–2008	Chris Phillips	1997–2015
G	Craig Anderson	2011–2020	Patrick Lalime	1999–2004

==== Philadelphia Flyers ====
Philadelphia Flyers
Position	First Team		Second Team	
Position	Player	Tenure	Player	Tenure
F	Simon Gagné	1999–2010; 2013	Daniel Brière	2007–2013
F	Claude Giroux^{$}	2008–2022	Sean Couturier^	2011–present
F	Mike Richards	2005–2011	Jakub Voráček	2011–2021
D	Éric Desjardins	1995–2006	Chris Pronger*	2009–2011
D	Kimmo Timonen	2007–2014	Ivan Provorov^{$}	2016–2023
G	Roman Čechmánek	2000–2003	Brian Boucher	1999–2002; 2009–2010; 2013

==== Pittsburgh Penguins ====
Pittsburgh Penguins
Position	First Team		Second Team	
Position	Player	Tenure	Player	Tenure
F	Sidney Crosby^	2005–present	Phil Kessel	2015–2019
F	Jake Guentzel^{$}	2016–2024	Chris Kunitz	2009–2017
F	Evgeni Malkin^	2006–present	Mario Lemieux*	1984–1997; 2000–2003; 2005
D	Sergei Gonchar	2005–2010	Brian Dumoulin^{$}	2013–2023
D	Kris Letang^	2006–present	Brooks Orpik	2002–2014
G	Marc-André Fleury^{⌑}	2003–2017	Matt Murray^{$}	2015–2020

==== San Jose Sharks ====
San Jose Sharks
Position	First Team		Second Team	
Position	Player	Tenure	Player	Tenure
F	Patrick Marleau	1997–2017; 2019–2020; 2021	Logan Couture^{⌑}	2009–2023
F	Joe Pavelski^{⌑}	2006–2019	Tomáš Hertl^{$}	2013–2024
F	Joe Thornton*	2005–2020	Owen Nolan	1995–2003
D	Brent Burns^{$}	2011–2022	Dan Boyle	2008–2014
D	Marc-Édouard Vlasic^{$}	2006–2025	Erik Karlsson^{$}	2018–2023
G	Evgeni Nabokov	2000–2010	Martin Jones^{⌑}	2015–2021

==== Seattle Kraken ====
Seattle Kraken^{†} (Note: The Kraken played their first game on October 12, 2021.)
Position	First Team		Second Team	
Position	Player	Tenure	Player	Tenure
F	Jordan Eberle^	2021–present	Matty Beniers^	2022–present
F	Yanni Gourde^{$}	2021–2025	Oliver Bjorkstrand^{$}	2022–2025
F	Jared McCann^	2021–present	Jaden Schwartz^	2021–present
D	Vince Dunn^	2021–present	Brandon Montour^	2024–present
D	Adam Larsson^	2021–present	Jamie Oleksiak^	2021–present
G	Joey Daccord^	2021–present	Philipp Grubauer^	2021–present

==== St. Louis Blues ====
St. Louis Blues
Position	First Team		Second Team	
Position	Player	Tenure	Player	Tenure
F	Vladimir Tarasenko^{$}	2013–2023	David Backes	2006–2016
F	Keith Tkachuk*	2001–2010	Ryan O'Reilly^{$}	2018–2023
F	Alexander Steen	2008–2020	David Perron^{$}	2007–2013; 2016–2017; 2018–2022
D	Alex Pietrangelo^{$}	2008–2020	Al MacInnis*	1995–2003
D	Chris Pronger*	1995–2004	Colton Parayko^	2015–present
G	Jordan Binnington^	2016; 2018–present	Brian Elliott	2011–2016

==== Tampa Bay Lightning ====
Tampa Bay Lightning
Position	First Team		Second Team	
Position	Player	Tenure	Player	Tenure
F	Nikita Kucherov^	2013–present	Vincent Lecavalier	1998–2013
F	Steven Stamkos^{$}	2008–2024	Brayden Point^	2016–present
F	Martin St. Louis*	2000–2014	Brad Richards	2000–2008
D	Dan Boyle	2002–2008	Pavel Kubina	1998–2006; 2010–2012
D	Victor Hedman^	2009–present	Ryan McDonagh^	2018–2022; 2024–present
G	Andrei Vasilevskiy^	2014–present	Ben Bishop	2013–2017

==== Toronto Maple Leafs ====
Toronto Maple Leafs
Position	First Team		Second Team	
Position	Player	Tenure	Player	Tenure
F	Mitch Marner^{$}	2016–2025	Phil Kessel	2009–2015
F	Auston Matthews^{^}	2016–present	William Nylander^{^}	2016–present
F	Mats Sundin^{*}	1995–2008	John Tavares^{^}	2018–present
D	Tomáš Kaberle	1998–2011	Bryan McCabe	2000–2008
D	Morgan Rielly^{^}	2013–present	Dion Phaneuf	2010–2016
G	Ed Belfour^{*}	2002–2006	Curtis Joseph	1998–2002; 2008–2009

==== Utah Hockey Club ====
Utah Hockey Club^{†‡} (Note: The then-Hockey Club played their first game on October 8, 2024. The team was renamed the Utah Mammoth on May 7, 2025, before the fan selections were announced.)
Position	First Team		Second Team	
Position	Player	Tenure	Player	Tenure
F	Logan Cooley^	2024–present	Alex Kerfoot^{$}	2024–2026
F	Dylan Guenther^	2024–present	Jack McBain^	2024–present
F	Clayton Keller^	2024–present	Nick Schmaltz^	2024–present
D	Michael Kesselring^{$}	2024–2025	Ian Cole^{$}	2024–2026
D	Mikhail Sergachev^	2024–present	Olli Maatta^{$}	2024–2026
G	Karel Vejmelka^	2024–present	Connor Ingram^{$}	2024–2025

==== Vancouver Canucks ====
Vancouver Canucks
Position	First Team		Second Team	
Position	Player	Tenure	Player	Tenure
F	Markus Näslund	1996–2008	Ryan Kesler	2003–2014
F	Daniel Sedin*	2000–2018	J. T. Miller^{$}	2019–2025
F	Henrik Sedin*	2000–2018	Elias Pettersson^	2018–present
D	Alexander Edler	2006–2021	Kevin Bieksa	2005–2015
D	Quinn Hughes^{$}	2019–2025	Mattias Öhlund	1997–2009
G	Roberto Luongo*	2006–2014	Thatcher Demko^	2018–present

==== Vegas Golden Knights ====
Vegas Golden Knights^{†} (Note: The Golden Knights played their first game on October 6, 2017.)
Position	First Team		Second Team	
Position	Player	Tenure	Player	Tenure
F	Jack Eichel^	2022–present	Jonathan Marchessault^{$}	2017–2024
F	William Karlsson^	2017–present	Reilly Smith^{$}	2017–2023; 2025–2026
F	Mark Stone^	2019–present	Chandler Stephenson^{$}	2019–2024
D	Alex Pietrangelo^{⌑}	2021–2025	Alec Martinez^{⌑}	2020–2024
D	Shea Theodore^	2017–present	Brayden McNabb^	2017–present
G	Adin Hill^	2022–present	Marc-André Fleury^{⌑}	2017–2021

==== Washington Capitals ====
Washington Capitals
Position	First Team		Second Team	
Position	Player	Tenure	Player	Tenure
F	Nicklas Bäckström^{#}	2007–2023	Peter Bondra	1990–2004
F	T. J. Oshie^{⌑}	2015–2024	Evgeny Kuznetsov^{#}	2014–2024
F	Alexander Ovechkin^	2005–present	Tom Wilson^	2013–present
D	John Carlson^{$}	2009–2026	Sergei Gonchar	1995–2004
D	Mike Green	2005–2015	Dmitry Orlov^{$}	2011–2023
G	Braden Holtby	2010–2020	Olie Kolzig	1989; 1993–2008

==== Winnipeg Jets ====
Winnipeg Jets^{‡} (Note: Selections include players from the Atlanta Thrashers who relocated to Winnipeg on June 21, 2011.)
Position	First Team		Second Team	
Position	Player	Tenure	Player	Tenure
F	Ilya Kovalchuk^{⌑}	2001–2010	Kyle Connor^	2016–present
F	Mark Scheifele^	2011; 2013–present	Nikolaj Ehlers^{$}	2015–2025
F	Blake Wheeler^{$}	2011–2023	Bryan Little	2007–2019
D	Dustin Byfuglien	2010–2019	Toby Enstrom	2007–2018
D	Josh Morrissey^	2016–present	Jacob Trouba^{$}	2013–2019
G	Connor Hellebuyck^	2015–present	Ondřej Pavelec	2007–2017

=== League-wide teams ===
==== NHL Top 25 ====
Only players selected to a club's First Team were eligible for selection.

NHL Top 25
Position	Player	Team	Tenure
F	Patrice Bergeron*	Boston Bruins	2003–2023
F	Sidney Crosby^	Pittsburgh Penguins	2005–present
F	Leon Draisaitl^	Edmonton Oilers	2014–present
F	Jarome Iginla*	Calgary Flames	1996–2013
F	Patrick Kane^{$}	Chicago Blackhawks	2007–2023
F	Anže Kopitar^{⌑}	Los Angeles Kings	2006–2026
F	Nathan MacKinnon^	Colorado Avalanche	2013–present
F	Evgeni Malkin^	Pittsburgh Penguins	2006–present
F	Connor McDavid^	Edmonton Oilers	2015–present
F	Alexander Ovechkin^	Washington Capitals	2005–present
F	Joe Pavelski^{⌑}	San Jose Sharks	2006–2019
F	Steven Stamkos^{$}	Tampa Bay Lightning	2008–2024
F	Joe Thornton*	San Jose Sharks	2005–2020
D	Brent Burns^{$}	San Jose Sharks	2011–2022
D	Zdeno Chára*	Boston Bruins	2006–2020
D	Drew Doughty^	Los Angeles Kings	2008–present
D	Victor Hedman^	Tampa Bay Lightning	2009–present
D	Erik Karlsson^{$}	Ottawa Senators	2009–2018
D	Duncan Keith*	Chicago Blackhawks	2005–2021
D	Nicklas Lidström*	Detroit Red Wings	1991–2012
G	Martin Brodeur*	New Jersey Devils	1992–2014
G	Marc-André Fleury^{⌑}	Pittsburgh Penguins	2003–2017
G	Henrik Lundqvist*	New York Rangers	2005–2020
G	Carey Price*	Montreal Canadiens	2007–2022
G	Patrick Roy*	Colorado Avalanche	1995–2003

==== NHL Top 25 Fan Vote ====
Only players selected to a club's First Team were eligible for selection.

NHL Top 25 Fan Vote
Skaters who debuted before 2000
Position	Player	Team	Tenure
F	Jarome Iginla*	Calgary Flames	1996–2013
F	Joe Sakic*	Colorado Avalanche	1988–2008
F	Teemu Selanne*	Anaheim Ducks	1995–2001, 2005–2014
F	Joe Thornton*	San Jose Sharks	2005–2020
D	Zdeno Chára*	Boston Bruins	2006–2020
D	Nicklas Lidström*	Detroit Red Wings	1991–2012
Skaters who debuted between 2000–2010
Position	Player	Team	Tenure
F	Patrice Bergeron*	Boston Bruins	2003–2023
F	Sidney Crosby^	Pittsburgh Penguins	2005–present
F	Pavel Datsyuk*	Detroit Red Wings	2001–2016
F	Patrick Kane^{$}	Chicago Blackhawks	2007–2023
F	Evgeni Malkin^	Pittsburgh Penguins	2006–present
F	Alexander Ovechkin^	Washington Capitals	2005–present
F	Steven Stamkos^{$}	Tampa Bay Lightning	2008–2024
Skaters who debuted after 2010
Position	Player	Team	Tenure
F	Leon Draisaitl^	Edmonton Oilers	2014–present
F	Johnny Gaudreau^{⌑}	Calgary Flames	2014–2022
F	Nathan MacKinnon^	Colorado Avalanche	2013–present
F	Auston Matthews^{^}	Toronto Maple Leafs	2016–present
F	Connor McDavid^	Edmonton Oilers	2015–present
D	Cale Makar^	Colorado Avalanche	2019–present
Goaltenders
Position	Player	Team	Tenure
G	Martin Brodeur*	New Jersey Devils	1992–2014
G	Marc-André Fleury^{⌑}	Pittsburgh Penguins	2003–2017
G	Henrik Lundqvist*	New York Rangers	2005–2020
G	Roberto Luongo*	Florida Panthers; Vancouver Canucks	2000–2006, 2014–2019; 2006–2014
G	Carey Price*	Montreal Canadiens	2007–2022
G	Patrick Roy*	Colorado Avalanche	1995–2003
