= Nathan MacKinnon =

Canadian ice hockey player (born 1995)

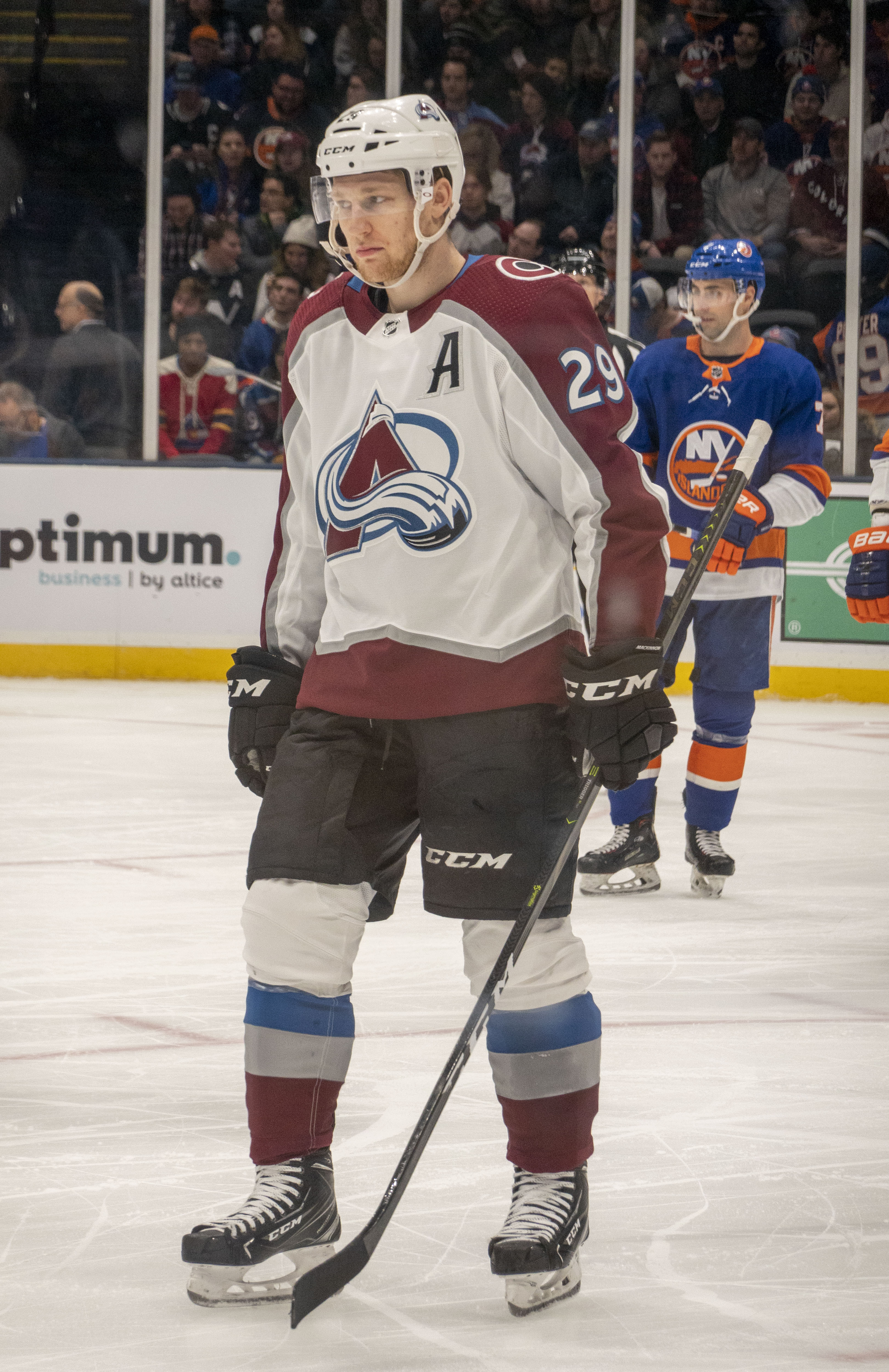
- MacKinnon with the Colorado Avalanche in January 2020
- Born: September 1, 1995 (age 31) Halifax, Nova Scotia, Canada
- Height: 6 ft 0 in (183 cm)
- Weight: 200 lb (91 kg; 14 st 4 lb)
- Position: Centre
- Shoots: Right
- NHL team: Colorado Avalanche
- National team: Canada
- NHL draft: 1st overall, 2013; Colorado Avalanche
- Playing career: 2013–present

Nathan Raymond MacKinnon (born September 1, 1995) is a Canadian professional ice hockey player who is a centre and alternate captain for the Colorado Avalanche of the National Hockey League (NHL). MacKinnon was selected first overall by Colorado in the 2013 NHL entry draft.

MacKinnon won the Stanley Cup with the Colorado Avalanche team in 2022. MacKinnon has been awarded the Calder Memorial Trophy in 2014 as the top rookie, the Lady Byng Memorial Trophy in 2020 for sportsmanship and performance, the Hart Memorial Trophy in as the most valuable player in 2024, the Ted Lindsay Award in 2024 as the most outstanding player and the Maurice "Rocket" Richard Trophy winner as the NHL's leading goal-scorer in 2026. He was selected as a finalist for the Hart Trophy in 2018, 2020, 2021 and 2026 and the Ted Lindsay Award in 2018, 2020 and 2025.

MacKinnon has been lauded as one of the best professional hockey players of his generation based on his achievements and skills as a player.

== Playing career ==
=== Early life ===
MacKinnon was born in Halifax, Nova Scotia, and grew up playing in the minor ice hockey system of Cole Harbour, Nova Scotia. As an atom aged player (under 11), MacKinnon recorded 200 points in 50 games. When MacKinnon was 12 and 13, he played Bantam AAA for the Cole Harbour Red Wings, recording seasons of 110 and 145 points, respectively. After these two seasons, MacKinnon enrolled at Shattuck-Saint Mary's in Faribault, Minnesota. MacKinnon left his hometown to attend the Minnesota boarding school as it was known for the strength of its ice hockey program. In his first season at Shattuck-Saint Mary's playing with the Bantam Tier I program, he scored 101 points in 58 games to finish second in team scoring. For the 2010–11 season, MacKinnon joined the under-16 Midget program at the school. Despite being the team's second-youngest player, MacKinnon was averaging more than two points a game and was second in team scoring at the midway point of the season. During the season, MacKinnon was named to the team that represented Nova Scotia in the ice hockey tournament at the 2011 Canada Winter Games. MacKinnon scored eight goals and eleven points to finish fourth in tournament scoring as Nova Scotia finished in seventh place. MacKinnon finished his second season at Shattuck-Saint Mary's with 93 points in 40 games played, and was second on the team with 45 goals scored.

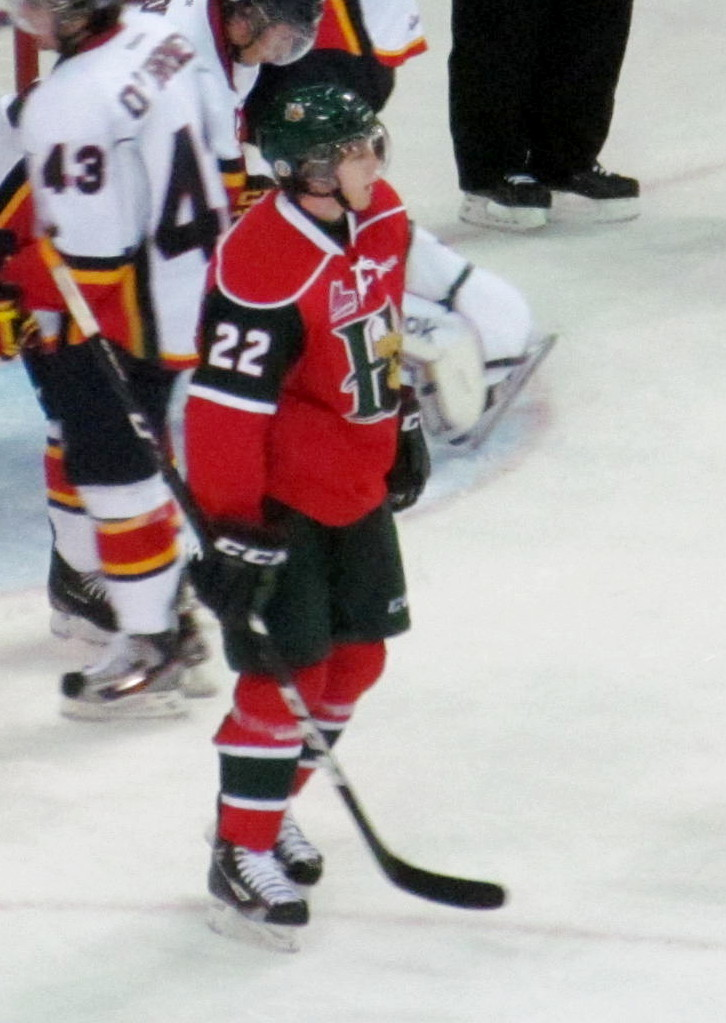
MacKinnon in October 2012. He played with the Halifax Mooseheads for two years during his major junior career.

=== Junior ===
Heading into the 2011 Quebec Major Junior Hockey League (QMJHL) Draft, MacKinnon was widely regarded as the favourite to be selected first overall and was ranked by QMJHL Central Scouting as the best available player. Despite this, MacKinnon spent the day of the draft skating with the Omaha Lancers of the United States Hockey League (USHL), as he was considering playing either college ice hockey in the National Collegiate Athletic Association (NCAA) or major junior ice hockey in the QMJHL. On June 4, 2011, MacKinnon was selected first overall by the Baie-Comeau Drakkar in the 2011 QMJHL Draft. Because MacKinnon did not speak Canadian French, there was speculation that he would follow through with his option to play in the USHL until he was eligible for the NCAA, unless his rights were traded to a different QMJHL team. On July 13, 2011, MacKinnon's rights were traded to the Halifax Mooseheads for Carl Gélinas, Francis Turbide, the Mooseheads' first round draft picks in 2012 and 2013 and the Quebec Remparts' first round draft pick in 2013, previously acquired by Halifax. The Mooseheads had been attempting to acquire MacKinnon since Baie-Comeau was awarded the first overall pick in the 2011 draft. MacKinnon scored his first QMJHL hat-trick on December 3, 2011, scoring five goals in a 6–4 victory over the Quebec Remparts. The opposing coach for the Remparts was his future coach with the Colorado Avalanche, NHL Hall of Famer Patrick Roy. With five goals in one game, he tied the Mooseheads record for the most goals in a single game held by Jason King.

On May 26, 2013, MacKinnon led the Mooseheads to their first Memorial Cup championship. He was also named Most Valuable Player, scoring a tournament-best seven goals and six assists in four games, and earned a spot on the Tournament All-Star team.

=== Colorado Avalanche (2013–present) ===
==== Early years, team and scoring difficulties (2013–2017) ====
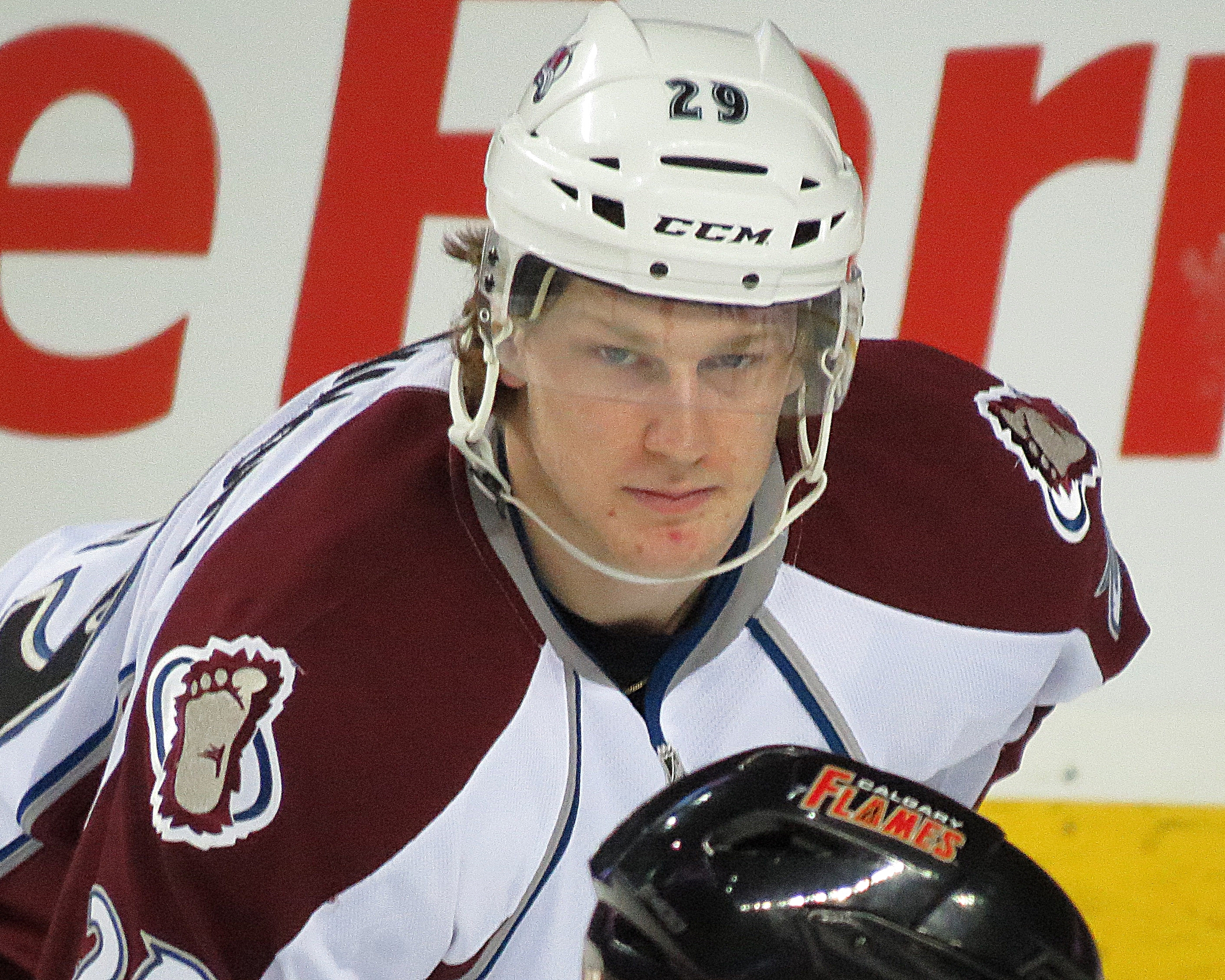
MacKinnon with the Colorado Avalanche in December 2013

On June 19, 2013, leading up to the 2013 NHL entry draft, Avalanche head coach Patrick Roy, who owned the first overall selection, stated publicly that his team would select MacKinnon if the draft were held then, despite widespread speculation that the team was likely to select defenceman Seth Jones, who grew up in Denver, Colorado. "It would be tough for us not to take MacKinnon," Roy told ESPN The Magazine. Roy also refused to rule out trading the pick. On June 26, Avalanche Director of Amateur Scouting Richard Pracey reiterated the team's decision to pick MacKinnon. On June 30, the Avalanche did indeed use their first overall pick in the draft to select MacKinnon (while Seth Jones was chosen fourth overall by the Nashville Predators. MacKinnon was signed to his first NHL contract, a three-year entry-level deal, with the Avalanche on July 9. MacKinnon made his NHL debut to begin the 2013–14 season on October 2, becoming the youngest hockey player to ever dress in a regular season game for the Colorado Avalanche franchise, registering two assists on two goals by Jamie McGinn in a 6–1 victory over the visiting Anaheim Ducks. MacKinnon scored his first NHL goal October 12, against Michal Neuvirth of the Washington Capitals during the second period at the Verizon Center. As the season went on, MacKinnon's role increased, as he was placed on the top two offensive lines. He claimed his first NHL record in becoming the youngest player to record back-to-back two-goal games from January 4–6, 2014, beating Dale Hawerchuk's of the original Winnipeg Jets from 1981. MacKinnon later compiled a 13-game point streak from January 25 to March 6, surpassing Wayne Gretzky (who turned 19 during his first season having a January birthday) to have the longest scoring streak by an 18-year-old in NHL history. MacKinnon finished the season appearing in all 82 games and led all rookies with 24 goals and 39 assists for 63 points as the Avalanche finished the season as the second seed in the Western Conference to qualify for the playoffs for the first time since 2010. MacKinnon became just the third player in the NHL to record seven points in his first two playoff games with a goal and six assists in the first two contests against the seventh-seeded Minnesota Wild in the opening round of the 2014 playoffs although the Avalanche would eventually fall to the Wild in seven games, despite initially building a 3–2 series lead. On June 24, MacKinnon won the Calder Memorial Trophy for the rookie of the year, becoming the youngest player to ever win this trophy and third in Avalanche history behind Chris Drury in 1998–99 and Gabriel Landeskog in 2011–12. He was subsequently selected to the NHL All-Rookie Team.

MacKinnon recorded his first career NHL hat trick on February 22, 2015, in a 5–4 win over the Tampa Bay Lightning to become the youngest player in Avalanche history to record a hat trick. Later in the same game, MacKinnon blocked a shot, resulting in a broken foot. He continued to play several more games and sustained a broken nose on February 26 in a 3–1 loss to the Minnesota Wild as a result from a hit by Wild’ forward Sean Bergenheim. He played one more game after these ailments, which was a 4–3 victory over the Pittsburgh Penguins on March 4 before missing the last 18 games of the season. Prior to getting sidelined, MacKinnon saw his individual production drop having recorded 14 goals and 24 assists for 38 points in the first 64 games of his sophomore NHL season and the Avalanche would struggle as a team having not qualifying for the playoffs.

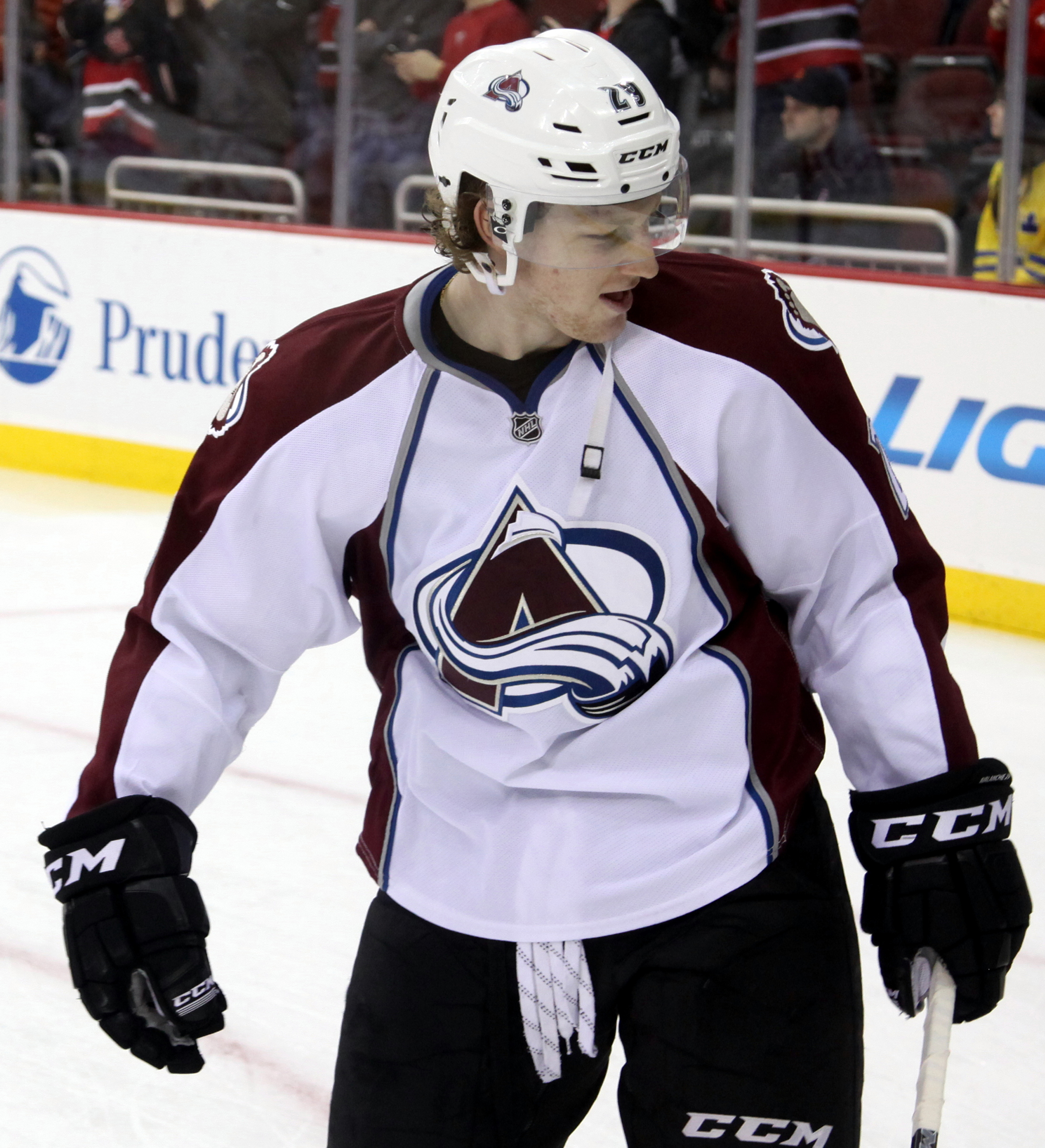
MacKinnon with the Avalanche in November 2014

On March 18, 2016, in a 4–3 victory over the Calgary Flames, MacKinnon suffered a torn medial collateral ligament (MCL), causing him to miss the final 10 games of the 2015–16 season. Prior to his injury, MacKinnon recorded 21 goals and 31 assists for 52 points in the first 72 games. Despite his increased productivity compared to the year prior, the Avalanche continued to struggle as a team as they missed the playoffs once more.

On July 8, 2016, MacKinnon as a restricted free agent re-signed with the Avalanche, agreeing to a seven-year, $44.1 million contract that averages $6.3 million per season. On October 13, two days before the 2016–17 season started, MacKinnon was announced as an alternate captain for the Avalanche. MacKinnon would be named to his first NHL All-Star Game on January 10, 2017, as the lone representative of the Avalanche. MacKinnon ended the season playing in all 82 games with 16 goals and 37 assists for 53 points as the Avalanche missed the playoffs for the third consecutive season and finished last place in the standings overall.

==== Ascent to stardom, Hart Trophy, Rocket Richard Trophy, Stanley Cup championship (2017–present) ====
In the 2017 off-season, MacKinnon hired a sports psychologist, which drastically helped him improve his play and emerge as one of the league's premier players during the 2017–18 season. On November 16, 2017, MacKinnon recorded his first career five-point game in a 6–2 win over the Washington Capitals having done so with a goal on Capitals' goaltender Philipp Grubauer and four assists on two goals by captain Gabriel Landeskog and goals by Colin Wilson and Mikko Rantanen, respectively. He was again selected the following year for the 2018 NHL All-Star Game. On January 30, 2018, in a 4–3 loss to the Vancouver Canucks, MacKinnon suffered a shoulder injury from a hit by Canucks’ defenseman Alexander Edler, resulting in him missing the next eight games. MacKinnon was named the NHL's First Star of the Week for February 26–March 4, 2018, after scoring five goals, six assists, with four power play points, a +6 rating, and 31 shots in four games. MacKinnon recorded his second career five-point game in a 7–1 win over the Minnesota Wild (scoring two goals on Wild goaltender Devan Dubnyk and adding three assists on goals by Tyson Barrie, Matt Nieto and Mikko Rantanen) on March 2, 2018. MacKinnon finished his breakout season playing in 74 games with 39 goals and 58 assists for 97 points to help the Avalanche finish the season as the eighth and final seed in the Western Conference to clinch a playoff spot for the first time since 2014, when MacKinnon was rookie. His 97 points ranked first on the Avalanche and fifth in the league. His 39 goals were most on the Avalanche and tied Tampa Bay Lightning forward Nikita Kucherov and New Jersey Devils forward Taylor Hall for seventh in the league. 12 of MacKinnon’s 39 goals were game winners, tying Tampa Bay Lightning’ forward Brayden Point for league leaders in game winning goals. In the 2018 playoffs, the Avalanche were defeated in the first round in six games by the Presidents' Trophy-winning Nashville Predators. MacKinnon recorded six points (three goals and three assists) in all six playoff games during the playoffs. On April 26, MacKinnon was named a finalist for the Ted Lindsay Award as the NHL's most outstanding player for the first time in his career which was eventually won by Edmonton Oilers forward and captain Connor McDavid. The following day he was named a Hart Memorial Trophy finalist for the first time in his career as the NHL's most valuable player in the regular season. The award was eventually won by New Jersey Devils' forward Taylor Hall as MacKinnon finished second in the voting.

MacKinnon finished the 2018–19 season with 99 points (41 goals, 58 assists) in all 82 games played, one-point short of his first career 100-point season. After the Avalanche as a team clinched the eighth and final playoff spot in the West for the second straight season, MacKinnon and the Avalanche defeated the top-seeded Calgary Flames in five games, marking the first time the Avalanche won a playoff series during MacKinnon's tenure with the team. After upsetting the Flames in the opening round, MacKinnon and the Avalanche would eventually be defeated in the second round in seven games by the San Jose Sharks. MacKinnon finished the 2019 playoffs with six goals and seven assists for 13 points in all 12 games played.

On January 7, 2020, MacKinnon played in his 500th NHL game in a 5–3 loss to the New York Rangers where he was able to score a goal on Rangers' goaltender Igor Shesterkin. MacKinnon was on pace to record his first career 100-point season during the 2019–20 season until the last three weeks of the regular season got cancelled due to the COVID-19 pandemic restrictions, having 35 goals and 58 assists for 93 points in 69 games at the time of the stoppage in March 2020. In the 2020 playoffs, MacKinnon set personal bests, tallying nine goals and 16 assists for 25 points in just 15 games as Colorado was eliminated in Game 7 of the second round by the Dallas Stars. On September 11, MacKinnon won the Lady Byng Memorial Trophy, which is awarded to the "player adjudged to have exhibited the best type of sportsmanship and gentlemanly conduct combined with a high standard of playing ability, becoming the third player in franchise history to win the award after Joe Sakic in 2000–01 and Ryan O'Reilly in 2013–14. MacKinnon was also named a finalist for both the Hart Memorial Trophy and Ted Lindsay Award for the second time in his career which were both eventually awarded to Edmonton Oilers forward Leon Draisaitl.

After the COVID-shortened 2020–21 season, the Avalanche won the Presidents' Trophy as the regular season champions. MacKinnon was once again the Avalanche's top scorer with 65 points (20 goals, 45 assists) in 48 games in the regular season. He followed that up with 15 points (eight goals and seven assists) in 10 playoff games as the Avalanche lost in the second round in six games to the Vegas Golden Knights. MacKinnon was named a finalist for the Hart Memorial Trophy for the third time in his career with it eventually being given to Edmonton Oilers forward and captain Connor McDavid.

On November 6, 2021, in a 4–2 loss to the Columbus Blue Jackets, MacKinnon sustained an undisclosed lower-body injury, resulting in him missing the next eight games. On January 26, 2022, MacKinnon suffered a broken nose and a concussion after receiving a stick to his face by Boston Bruins forward Taylor Hall, causing him to miss four games and the 2022 NHL All-Star Game. MacKinnon finished the 2021–22 season with 32 goals and 56 assists for 88 points recorded in 65 games played while the Avalanche as a team finished as the top seed in the Western Conference and the Presidents' Trophy runner-up being only behind the Florida Panthers. On June 26, MacKinnon won his first Stanley Cup championship with the Avalanche, defeating the two-time defending Stanley Cup champion and fifth-seeded Tampa Bay Lightning in six games in the 2022 Stanley Cup Final. MacKinnon led all skaters with 13 goals in the 2022 playoffs (tied with Evander Kane of the Edmonton Oilers). He also recorded 11 assists for 24 points in all 20 games played. His performance throughout the playoffs put MacKinnon in the spot as a potential candidate for the Conn Smythe Trophy as the playoff MVP although the award eventually was given to Avalanche defenceman and teammate Cale Makar.

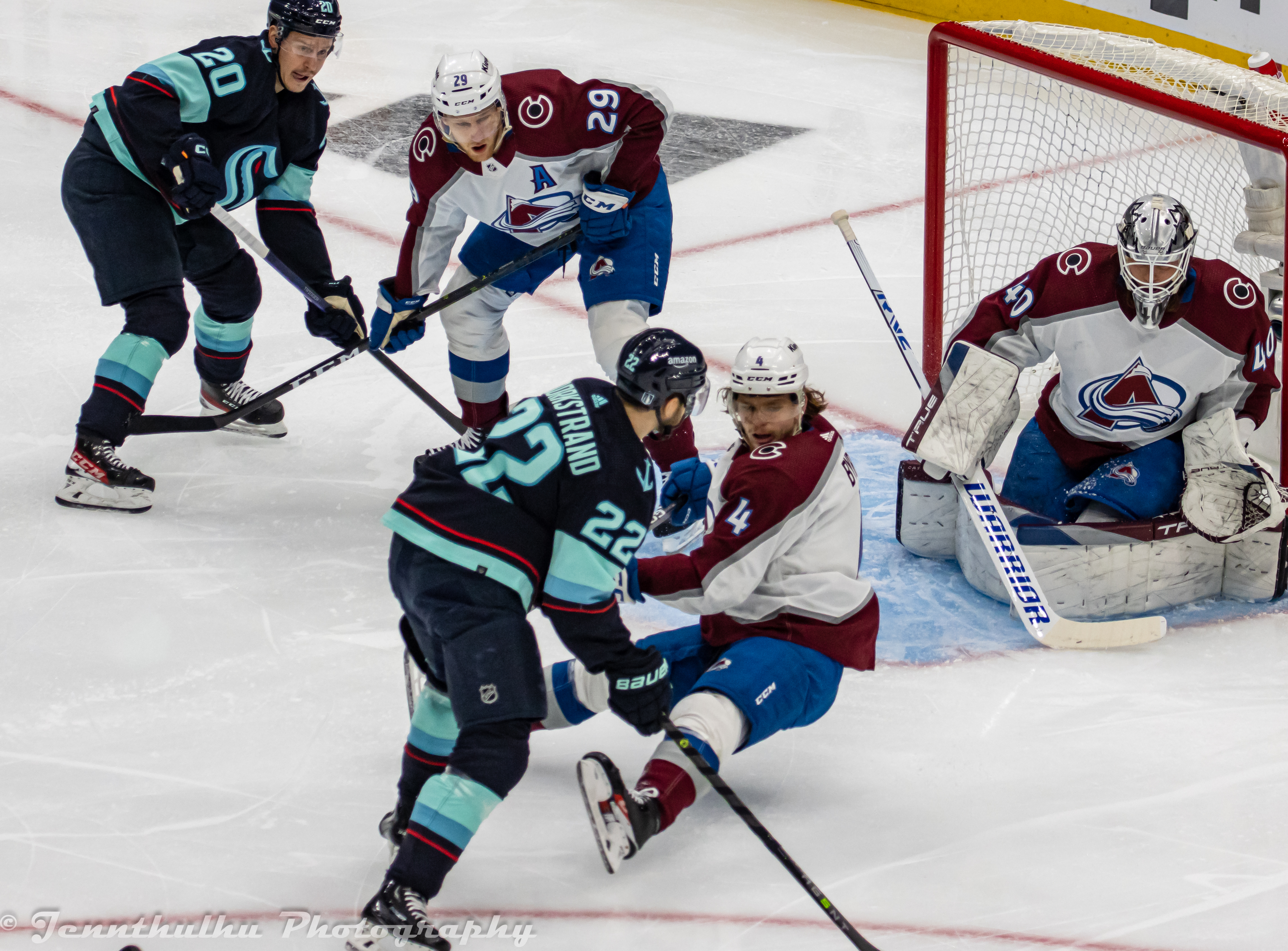
MacKinnon (top center) in April 2023 during the first round of the 2023 Stanley Cup playoffs

On September 20, 2022, MacKinnon signed an eight-year, $100.8 million contract extension with the Avalanche. The contract carries an average annual value of $12.6 million, the highest in league history. This record would be surpassed in August 2023 when Toronto Maple Leafs forward Auston Matthews signed a deal with an AAV of $13.25 million. On December 5, in a 5–3 loss to the Philadelphia Flyers, MacKinnon suffered an undisclosed upper-body injury as a result from blocking a shot from Flyers’ forward Scott Laughton, causing him to miss the next 11 games. MacKinnon ended the 2022–23 season with 42 goals and a career high 69 assists for 111 points in 71 games along with three goals and four assists for seven points in all seven games in the Avalanche first round exit in the 2023 playoffs against the seventh-seeded Seattle Kraken.

On December 5, 2023, MacKinnon recorded his 500th career assist on a Logan O'Connor goal in a 3–2 win over the Anaheim Ducks. On December 21, MacKinnon scored his 300th career goal and seventh career hat-trick in a 6–4 win over the Ottawa Senators. On April 18, 2024, MacKinnon notched two assists on goals by Mikko Rantanen and Valeri Nichushkin, bringing him to an Avalanche-record 140 points. His 2023–24 season ended with MacKinnon playing in all 82 games, earning career highs in goals (51), assists (89) and points (140); he finished second for the Art Ross Trophy behind the 144 points by Tampa Bay Lightning forward Nikita Kucherov. The Avalanche defeated the Winnipeg Jets in five games in the opening round of the 2024 playoffs before falling in six games against the Dallas Stars. MacKinnon finished the playoffs with four goals and 10 assists for 14 points in all On June 27, MacKinnon won the Ted Lindsay Award, beating out fellow finalists Kucherov and Auston Matthews of the Toronto Maple Leafs, becoming the third player in franchise history to win the Hart after Joe Sakic in 2000–01 and Peter Forsberg in 2002–03 and the second in franchise history to win the Lindsay after Joe Sakic in 2000–01. Additionally, he was also the recipient for the Hart Memorial Trophy as the regular season's most valuable player, beating out the other two finalists of Kucherov and Edmonton Oilers forward and captain Connor McDavid.

On December 10, 2024, in a 6–2 victory over the Pittsburgh Penguins, MacKinnon recorded his 600th career assist on a goal by Mikko Rantanen. He ended that game with five points (a goal and four assists). On March 10, 2025, in a 3–0 victory over the Chicago Blackhawks, Mackinnon recorded his 1,000th career point with an assist on a goal by Artturi Lehkonen, becoming the 100th player in league history to reach the marker. He was named a Ted Lindsay finalist for the fourth time after the 2024–25 season, which was eventually awarded to Nikita Kucherov. MacKinnon recorded earned 116 points (32 goals, 84 assists) during the 2024–25 campaign. His 84 assists along with Nikita Kucherov's 84 assists led the league in assists and MacKinnon's 116 points was good for second place in points behind Kucherov, once more. He also had seven goals and four assists for 11 points in all seven games in the Avalanche first round exit to the Dallas Stars.

On October 7, 2025, in Colorado's 2025–26 season-opening game, MacKinnon recorded two assists in a 4–1 win over the Los Angeles Kings, and became the all-time leader in points of the franchise since its relocation before the 1995–96 season, passing Joe Sakic. Following a 6–2 win over the Florida Panthers on December 11, MacKinnon scored his 392nd career goal moving him to the top of the franchise goal scored rankings ahead of Joe Sakic since their relocation from Quebec in 1995. MacKinnon became the 70th player in NHL history to record 1,100 points after he scored a goal during a 5–2 win against the Washington Capitals on January 19, 2026. During a March 10 game against the Edmonton Oilers, MacKinnon received the first career ten-minute game misconduct penalty of his career when he collided with Oilers goalie Connor Ingram. The NHL rescinded the penalty on March 12. He set the Colorado Avalanche franchise record for even-strength points in a season, at 93, following an April 4 game against the Dallas Stars. On April 9, he scored his 52nd goal of the season during a game against the Calgary Flames, setting a new season high. He ended the season with a career-high and league-leading 53 goals, earning him his first career Maurice "Rocket" Richard Trophy. He became the second player in franchise history to win the award after Milan Hejduk in 2002–03. He also recorded 74 assists for 127 total points in 80 contests played. His 127 points ranked him third in the league in points (only behind Nikita Kucherov’s 130 points and Connor McDavid’s league-leading 134 points, respectively). 97 of Mackinnon’s points were at even strength, marking the highest even strength point total since Wayne Gretzky in 1990–91. MacKinnon also had a league-leading +57 plus-minus rating. For the fifth time in his career, MacKinnon was named a finalist for the Hart Memorial Trophy.

== International play ==
Medal record

Men's ice hockey

Representing Canada

Winter Olympics
Silver medal – second place	2026 Milano Cortina	

World Championships
Gold medal – first place	2015 Czech Republic	
Silver medal – second place	2017 Germany/France	

4 Nations Face-Off
Winner	2025 Canada/United States	

MacKinnon's first experience with Hockey Canada came when he was named to the Canada Atlantic team for the 2011 World U-17 Hockey Challenge. Despite being the second-youngest player at the tournament, MacKinnon scored five goals and eight points in only five games to finish seventh in tournament scoring. This included a game in which he scored two goals and two assists to be named player of the game as Canada Atlantic defeated Finland 4–3. His impressive play helped Canada Atlantic to its best finish since the 2005 World U-17 Hockey Challenge, defeating Canada West 2–1 in the fifth place game. The following year, MacKinnon was named to the Canada Atlantic team for the 2012 World U-17 Hockey Challenge.

On December 13, 2012, MacKinnon was named to the Canadian junior team for the 2013 World Junior Ice Hockey Championships, alongside with Mooseheads teammate Jonathan Drouin. The tournament ended in disappointment for the Canadians, who were eliminated in the quarterfinals and finished in fifth place overall.

MacKinnon made his senior national team debut at the 2014 IIHF World Championship. He returned for the 2015 IIHF World Championship, where Canada won the gold medal for the first time since 2007 with a perfect 10–0 record. MacKinnon finished the tournament with 4 goals and 5 assists. The following year, the NHL held the 2016 World Cup of Hockey, where MacKinnon competed as a member of Team North America, a squad composed of the best Canadian and American players under the age of 24. The year after that, he returned to the Canadian national team for the 2017 IIHF World Championship, where he led the team in points on the way to a silver medal, having been defeated by Sweden in the final. Coming off a disappointing season in the NHL, MacKinnon called his experience with the national team beneficial.

After nearly a decade without a major international tournament held with full NHL participation, the league hosted the 4 Nations Face-Off in February 2025. MacKinnon was again part of Canada, and scored four goals in four games, including the first goal in Canada's 3–2 win in the championship game against the United States He was named the most valuable player of the tournament. After the Avalanche were eliminated from 2025 Stanley Cup playoffs in the first round, he rejoined the national team for the 2025 IIHF World Championship. Canada finished first in its group, with MacKinnon leading the team in scoring, but was upset in the quarterfinals by tournament co-host Denmark.

MacKinnon was named to the Canadian team for the 2026 Winter Olympics, the first edition with full NHL participation since 2014.

In the round robin stage, MacKinnon took a forearm hit in the jaw from French player Pierre Crinon which was seen as a dirty hit; later in the game his Canadian teammate Tom Wilson retaliated by fighting Crinon (Wilson achieved the first Gordie Howe hat trick in Olympic hockey) and both were ejected. France later suspended Crinon for jeering the crowd as he left the ice. On February 20, MacKinnon scored the winning goal in Canada's 3–2 semifinal victory over Finland, taking the team to the championship final. During the third period of the final, MacKinnon would end up missing on a wide-open net that would have put Canada up 2–1 over the United States with 10:50 left to play. Canada would end up falling to the States 2–1 in overtime. MacKinnon was visibly upset during the medal ceremony, with him being spotted shaking his head in annoyance at the plush animal awarded to all medalists in the games. To further express his frustration, MacKinnon would go on record stating, "You be the judge of who was the better team."

In 2026, Mackinnon missed out on being selected for the 2026 IIHF World Championship as Colorado Avalanche were in the Stanley Cup playoffs.

== Career statistics ==
=== Regular season and playoffs ===
Bold indicates led league

			Regular season					Playoffs
Season	Team	League	GP	G	A	Pts	PIM	GP	G	A	Pts	PIM
2007–08	Cole Harbour Wings	Bantam AAA	50	—	—	110	—	—	—	—	—	—
2008–09	Cole Harbour Wings	Bantam AAA	35	—	—	145	—	—	—	—	—	—
2009–10	Shattuck-Saint Mary's	Bantam AAA	58	54	47	101	56	—	—	—	—	—
2010–11	Shattuck-Saint Mary's	Midget AAA	40	45	48	93	72	—	—	—	—	—
2011–12	Halifax Mooseheads	QMJHL	58	31	47	78	45	17	13	15	28	12
2012–13	Halifax Mooseheads	QMJHL	44	32	43	75	45	17	11	22	33	12
2013–14	Colorado Avalanche	NHL	82	24	39	63	26	7	2	8	10	4
2014–15	Colorado Avalanche	NHL	64	14	24	38	34	—	—	—	—	—
2015–16	Colorado Avalanche	NHL	72	21	31	52	20	—	—	—	—	—
2016–17	Colorado Avalanche	NHL	82	16	37	53	16	—	—	—	—	—
2017–18	Colorado Avalanche	NHL	74	39	58	97	55	6	3	3	6	4
2018–19	Colorado Avalanche	NHL	82	41	58	99	34	12	6	7	13	2
2019–20	Colorado Avalanche	NHL	69	35	58	93	12	15	9	16	25	12
2020–21	Colorado Avalanche	NHL	48	20	45	65	37	10	8	7	15	2
2021–22	Colorado Avalanche	NHL	65	32	56	88	42	20	**13**	11	24	8
2022–23	Colorado Avalanche	NHL	71	42	69	111	30	7	3	4	7	4
2023–24	Colorado Avalanche	NHL	82	51	89	140	42	11	4	10	14	4
2024–25	Colorado Avalanche	NHL	79	32	**84**	116	41	7	7	4	11	2
2025–26	Colorado Avalanche	NHL	80	**53**	74	127	39	13	7	8	15	6
NHL totals			950	420	722	1,142	428	108	62	78	140	48

=== International ===
Year	Team	Event	Result	GP	G	A	Pts	PIM
2011	Canada Atlantic	U17	5th	5	5	3	8	0
2012	Canada Atlantic	U17	7th	5	1	3	4	2
2012	Canada	IH18	1st	5	5	6	11	18
2013	Canada	WJC	4th	6	0	1	1	4
2014	Canada	WC	5th	8	1	3	4	8
2015	Canada	WC	1st place, gold medalist(s)	10	4	5	9	6
2016	Team North America	WCH	5th	3	2	1	3	2
2017	Canada	WC	2nd place, silver medalist(s)	10	6	9	15	6
2025	Canada	4NF	1st place, gold medalist(s)	4	4	0	4	0
2025	Canada	WC	5th	8	7	6	13	10
2026	Canada	OG	2nd place, silver medalist(s)	6	4	3	7	2
Junior totals				21	11	13	24	24
Senior totals				49	28	27	55	34

== Awards, honours, and records ==
Award	Year	Ref.
CHL / QMJHL
Ed Chynoweth Trophy	2013	
Memorial Cup champion	2013	
Stafford Smythe Memorial Trophy	2013	
CHL Memorial Cup All-Star team	2013	
NHL
Calder Memorial Trophy	2014	
NHL All-Rookie Team	2014	
NHL All-Star Game	2017, 2018, 2019, 2020, 2022, 2023, 2024	
NHL Second All-Star team	2018, 2020, 2026	
NHL First All-Star team	2024, 2025	
NHL Quarter-Century Team	2025	
NHL Quarter-Century Colorado Avalanche First Team	2025	
Lady Byng Memorial Trophy	2020	
Stanley Cup Champion	2022	
Hart Memorial Trophy	2024	
Ted Lindsay Award	2024	
Maurice "Rocket" Richard Trophy	2026	
International
4 Nations Face-Off MVP	2025	

=== Records ===
==== Colorado Avalanche ====
Note: this includes the team's years as the Quebec Nordiques

- Most career overtime goals (15)
- Youngest player to record their first NHL goal (18 years, 41 days)
- Most points in a season (140, in 2023–24)
- Most two-point games in a season (44, in 2023–24)

== Acting career ==
MacKinnon has appeared in a recurring role (along with former Halifax Mooseheads teammate Cameron Critchlow) on the Canadian television show Mr. D, playing a fictionalized version of himself. He first appeared in season 2 episode 4, when he and a teammate have to leave an exam early to play in a school hockey game. When the teammates tell Mr. D (portrayed by Gerry Dee) that they did not finish the exam, he tells them to take it home and return it completed the next day. In season 3 episode 7, he is in detention for missing too much school to play hockey. Mr. D is oblivious to his talent and reprimands him ("Hockey's not a job"), although it is implied that, in the show's timeline, this takes place before the 2013 NHL entry draft, where MacKinnon was drafted first overall, despite airing in 2014. In season 4 episode 11, MacKinnon returns to give tickets to an Avalanche game to the school principal. When Mr. D enters the room a moment later, he calls MacKinnon "Mr. Calder" and tells him that he always believed in him. When Mr. D. asks for tickets to a game, MacKinnon tells him that all the games, including those in the exhibition and the following season, are sold out.

MacKinnon has also appeared as himself in Trailer Park Boys, season 11 episode 7 at Ricky's ball hockey camp. In 2019, he returned in a voice acting role in Trailer Park Boys: The Animated Series season 1 episode 3, again portraying himself.

MacKinnon, along with fellow Cole Harbour-born NHL player Sidney Crosby, have appeared in a series of Tim Hortons commercials produced for the social media platform YouTube. During his acting career, MacKinnon has turned to Crosby for inspiration, including the 2019 playoffs. MacKinnon, Crosby, and Brad Marchand are known across the globe as the “Nova Scotia Mafia”, and they have played for Canada at the 4 Nations Face-Off and 2026 Winter Olympics.

Awards and achievements
Preceded by Nail Yakupov	NHL first overall draft pick 2013	Succeeded by Aaron Ekblad
Preceded by Duncan Siemens	Colorado Avalanche first-round draft pick 2013	Succeeded by Conner Bleackley
Preceded by Jonathan Huberdeau	Winner of the Calder Trophy; 2014	Succeeded by Aaron Ekblad
Preceded by Aleksander Barkov	Lady Byng Memorial Trophy; 2020	Succeeded by Jaccob Slavin
Preceded by Connor McDavid	Hart Memorial Trophy; 2024	Succeeded by Connor Hellebuyck
Preceded by Connor McDavid	Ted Lindsay Award; 2024	Succeeded by Nikita Kucherov
Preceded by Leon Draisaitl	Maurice "Rocket" Richard Trophy winner 2026	Succeeded by Incumbent
