= Ted Lindsay Award =

Ice hockey award

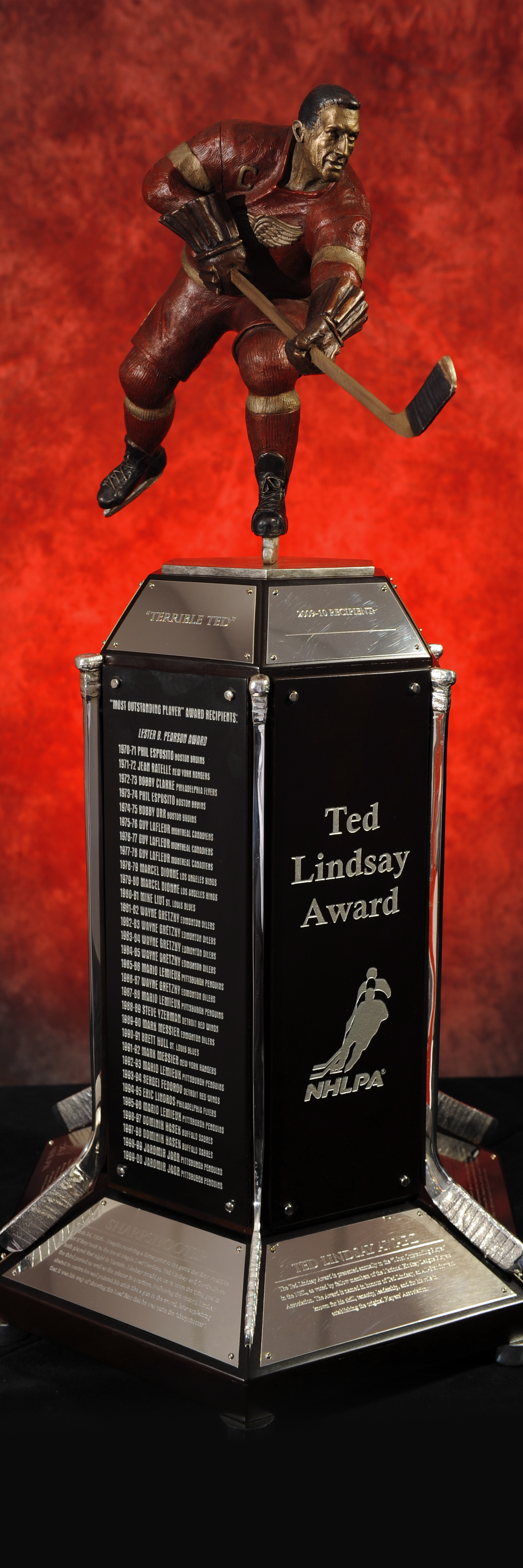
- Sport: Ice hockey
- Awarded for: National Hockey League's outstanding player in the regular season as judged by the members of the NHL Players Association

History
- First award: 1971–72 NHL season
- First winner: Phil Esposito
- Most wins: Wayne Gretzky & Connor McDavid (5)
- Most recent: Connor McDavid; Edmonton Oilers

The Ted Lindsay Award, formerly known as the Lester B. Pearson Award, is awarded annually to the National Hockey League's most outstanding player in the regular season as judged by the members of the NHL Players' Association. First awarded in 1971, it is a companion to the Hart Memorial Trophy, which is awarded to the League's Most Valuable Player, as judged by members of the Professional Hockey Writers' Association. The award was renamed in 2010 after Ted Lindsay of the Detroit Red Wings.

== History ==
The award was first handed out at the conclusion of the 1970–71 NHL season. It was named in honour of Lester B. Pearson, who was Prime Minister of Canada from 1963 to 1968, the recipient of the 1957 Nobel Peace Prize, and a former player and coach for the University of Toronto Varsity Blues men's ice hockey team.

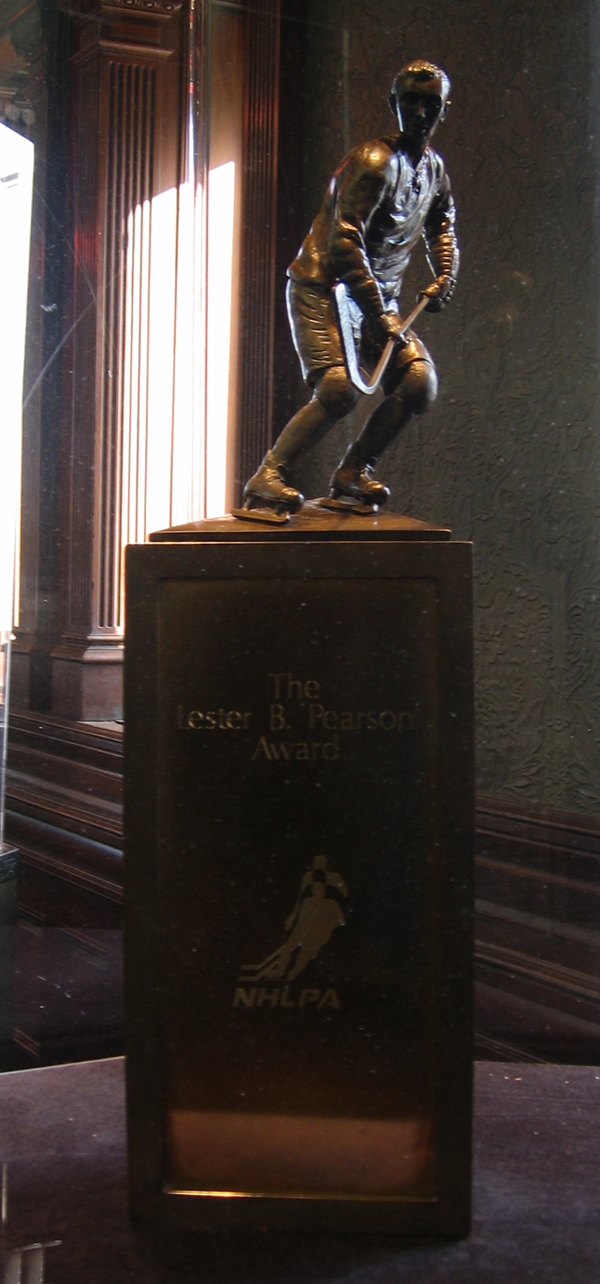
The trophy used for the award from 1971 to 2009.

On April 29, 2010, the National Hockey League Players' Association announced that the award would be reintroduced as the Ted Lindsay Award to honor Hall of Famer Ted Lindsay for his skill, tenacity, leadership, and role in establishing the original Players' Association. The voting for the trophy is conducted at the end of the regular season by the members of the NHL Players Association.

Connor McDavid and Wayne Gretzky have each won the award a record five times. Members of the Edmonton Oilers have won the award 12 times, while members of the Pittsburgh Penguins won the award ten times. The Lindsay Award is considered to be the companion of the Hart Memorial Trophy—the trophies have been won by the same player for the same season 35 times (of the 52 seasons both have been awarded) by 22 players: Bobby Clarke, Phil Esposito, Guy Lafleur (x2), Gretzky (x5), Mario Lemieux (x3), Mark Messier (x2), Brett Hull, Sergei Fedorov, Eric Lindros, Dominik Hasek (x2), Jaromir Jagr, Joe Sakic, Martin St. Louis, Sidney Crosby (x3), Alexander Ovechkin (x3), Evgeni Malkin, Carey Price, Patrick Kane, Connor McDavid (x3), Nikita Kucherov (x2), Leon Draisaitl, Auston Matthews, and Nathan MacKinnon. 13 of those players have also won the Art Ross Trophy for the same season a combined 23 times and completed a Hart-Pearson/Lindsay-Art Ross sweep: Esposito, Lafleur (x2), Gretzky (x5), Lemieux (x3), Jagr, St. Louis, Crosby (x2), Ovechkin, Malkin, Kane, McDavid (x3), Kucherov and Draisaitl. Hasek and Price are the only goaltenders to win the Hart and Pearson/Lindsay in the same year. Bobby Orr won the Norris, Pearson and Art Ross in 1974-75 and is the only defenceman to win the Pearson/Lindsay. Lafleur, Lemieux (x2) and Gretzky (x5), Ovechkin and McDavid have also all led the league in goal scoring in the years they won the Hart, Pearson/Lindsay and Art Ross; though only Ovechkin and McDavid won the Maurice "Rocket" Richard Trophy which was introduced in 1998–99. Brett Hull, Ovechkin and Auston Matthews have also led the league in goals in years they won the Hart and Pearson/Lindsay (but not the Art Ross).

== Winners ==
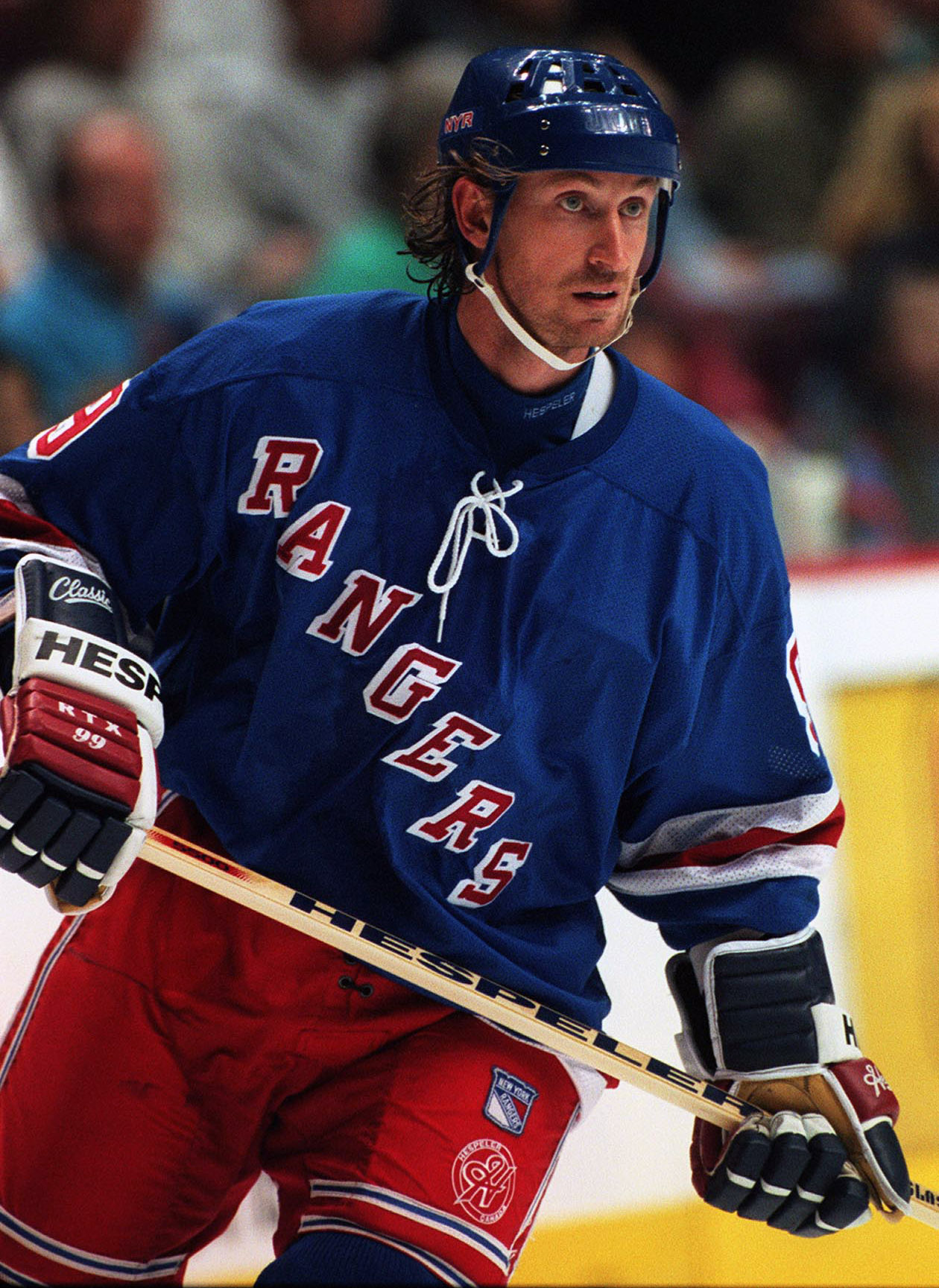
Wayne Gretzky, joint record five-time winner.

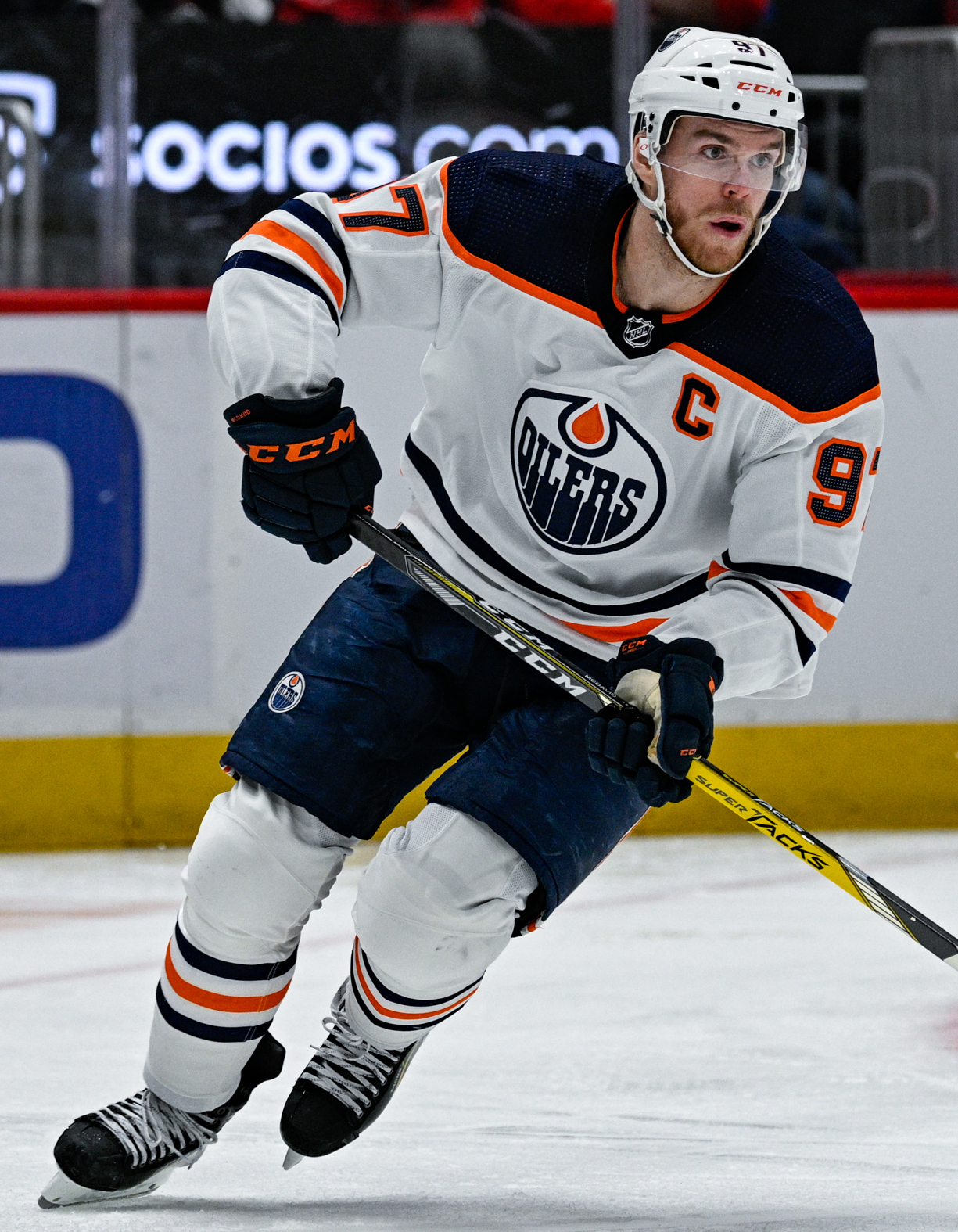
Connor McDavid, joint record five-time winner.

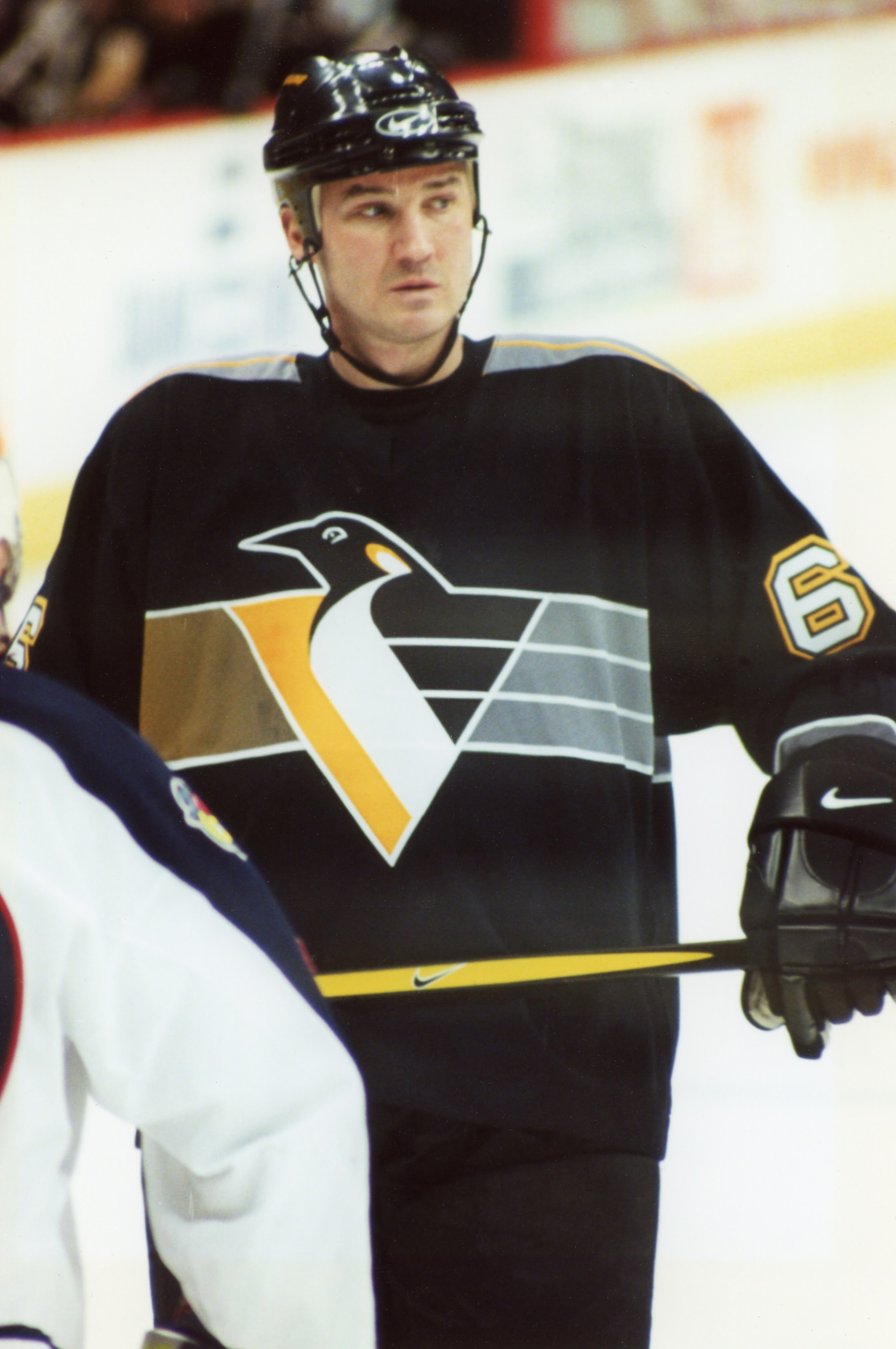
Mario Lemieux, four-time winner.

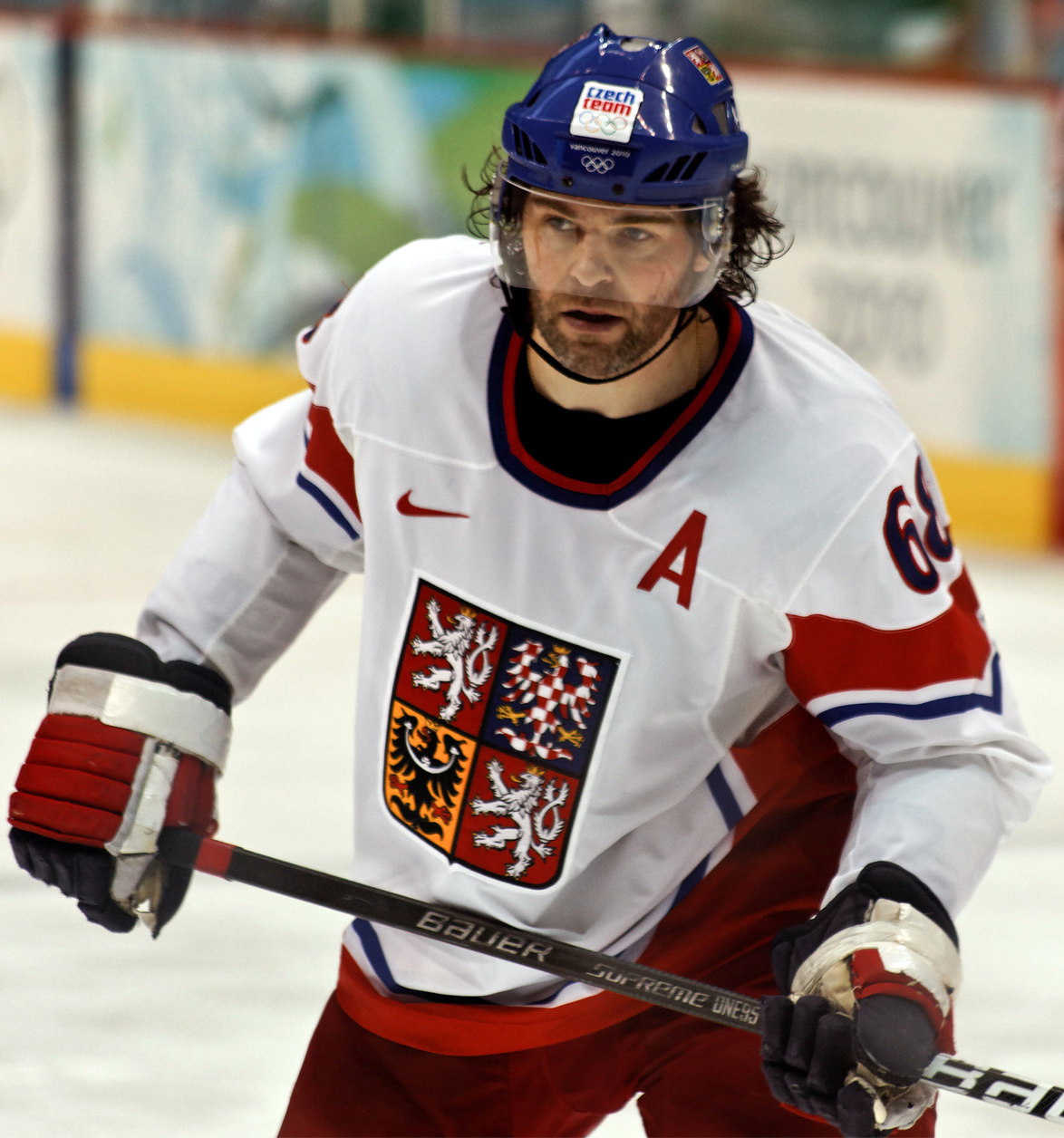
Jaromir Jagr, three-time winner.

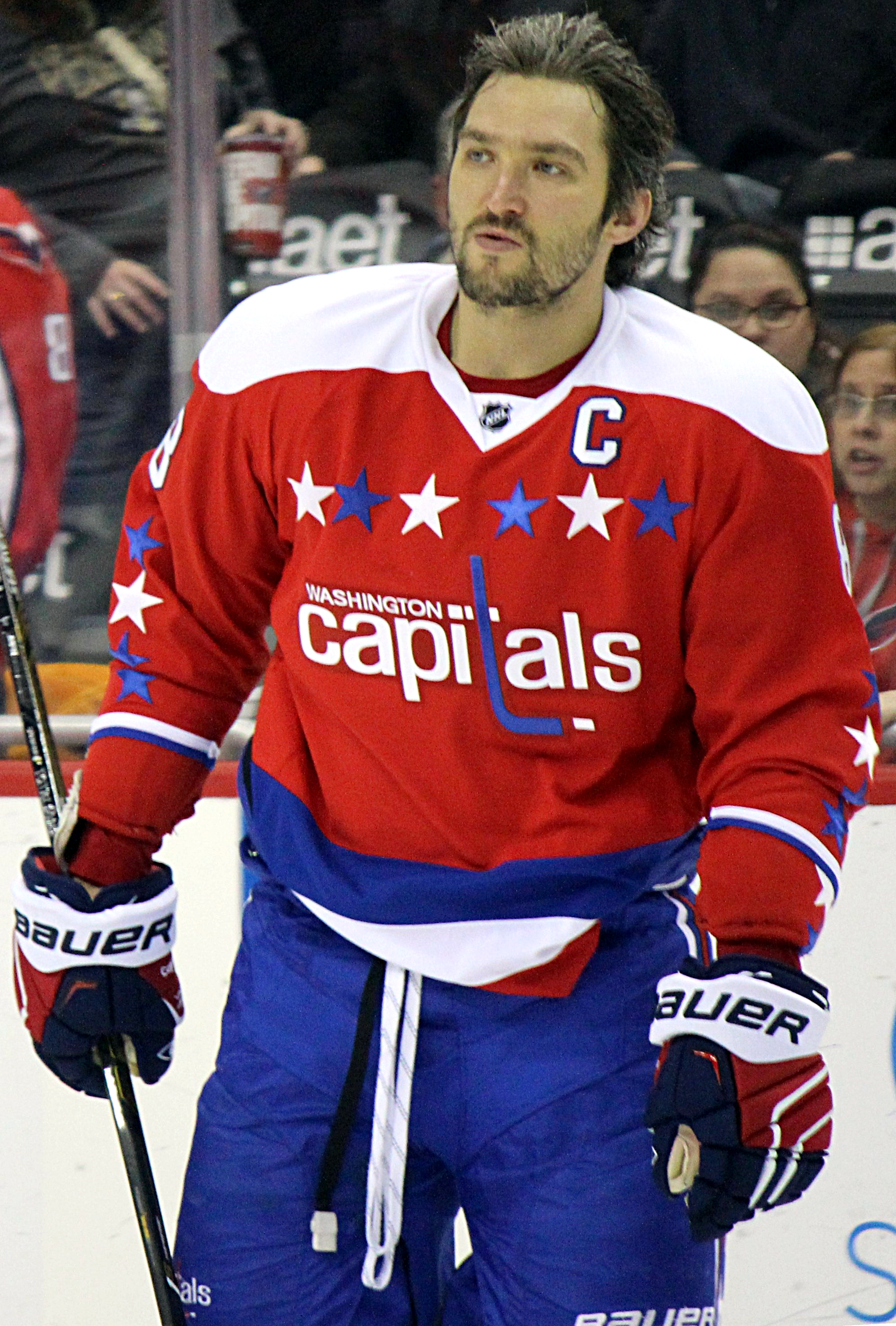
Alexander Ovechkin, three-time winner.

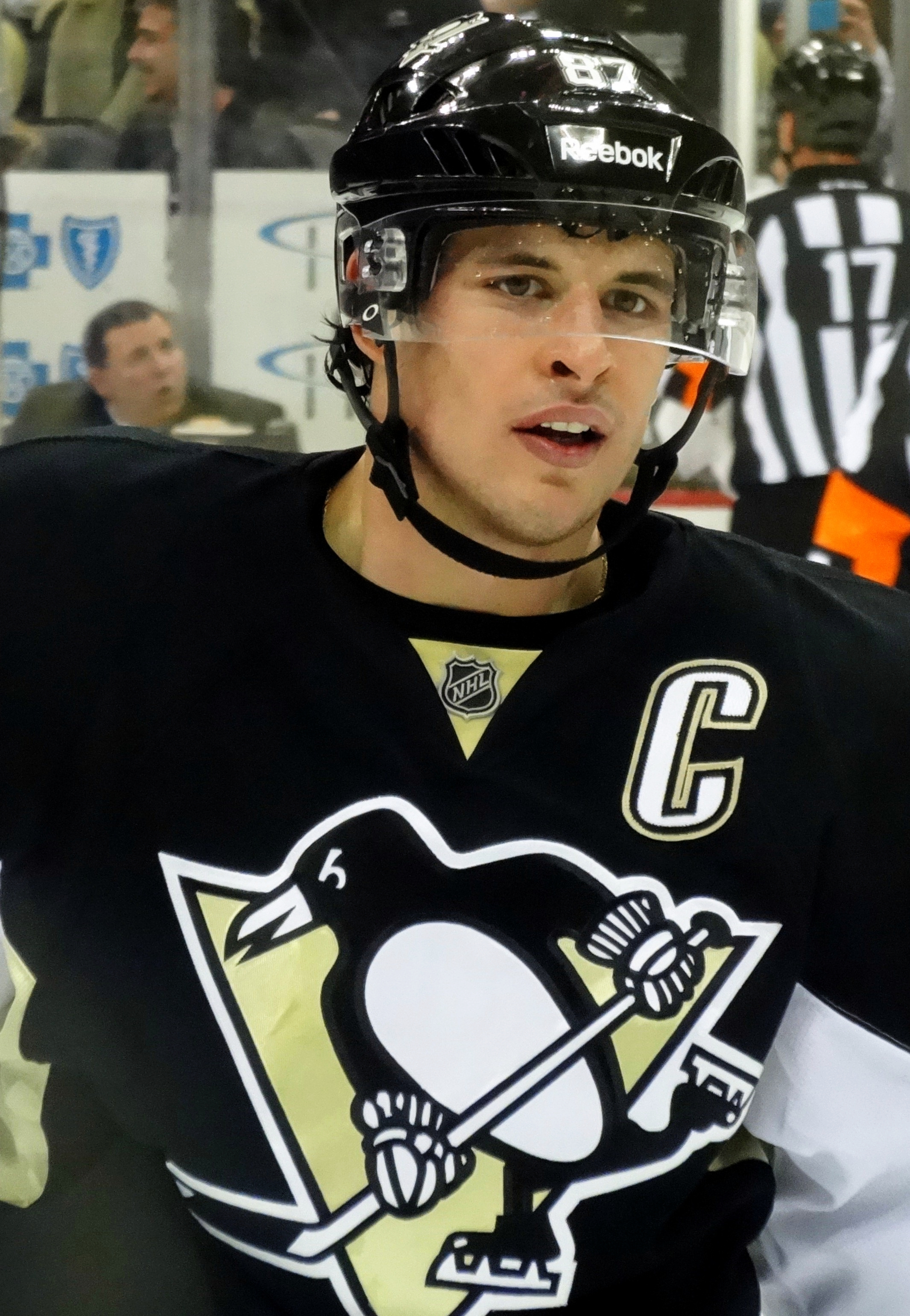
Sidney Crosby, three-time winner.

Positions key
C	Centre	D	Defence	RW	Right wing	LW	Left wing	G	Goaltender

Player is still active in the NHL
Eligible player not yet elected to Hockey Hall of Fame
Inactive player not yet eligible for the Hockey Hall of Fame

Season	Winner	Team	Position	Win #
As Lester B. Pearson Award
1970–71	Phil Esposito	Boston Bruins	C	1
1971–72	Jean Ratelle	New York Rangers	C	1
1972–73	Bobby Clarke	Philadelphia Flyers	C	1
1973–74	Phil Esposito	Boston Bruins	C	2
1974–75	Bobby Orr	Boston Bruins	D	1
1975–76	Guy Lafleur	Montreal Canadiens	RW	1
1976–77	Guy Lafleur	Montreal Canadiens	RW	2
1977–78	Guy Lafleur	Montreal Canadiens	RW	3
1978–79	Marcel Dionne	Los Angeles Kings	C	1
1979–80	Marcel Dionne	Los Angeles Kings	C	2
1980–81	Mike Liut	St. Louis Blues	G	1
1981–82	Wayne Gretzky	Edmonton Oilers	C	1
1982–83	Wayne Gretzky	Edmonton Oilers	C	2
1983–84	Wayne Gretzky	Edmonton Oilers	C	3
1984–85	Wayne Gretzky	Edmonton Oilers	C	4
1985–86	Mario Lemieux	Pittsburgh Penguins	C	1
1986–87	Wayne Gretzky	Edmonton Oilers	C	5
1987–88	Mario Lemieux	Pittsburgh Penguins	C	2
1988–89	Steve Yzerman	Detroit Red Wings	C	1
1989–90	Mark Messier	Edmonton Oilers	C	1
1990–91	Brett Hull	St. Louis Blues	RW	1
1991–92	Mark Messier	New York Rangers	C	2
1992–93	Mario Lemieux	Pittsburgh Penguins	C	3
1993–94	Sergei Fedorov	Detroit Red Wings	C	1
1994–95	Eric Lindros	Philadelphia Flyers	C	1
1995–96	Mario Lemieux	Pittsburgh Penguins	C	4
1996–97	Dominik Hasek	Buffalo Sabres	G	1
1997–98	Dominik Hasek	Buffalo Sabres	G	2
1998–99	Jaromir Jagr	Pittsburgh Penguins	RW	1
1999–2000	Jaromir Jagr	Pittsburgh Penguins	RW	2
2000–01	Joe Sakic	Colorado Avalanche	C	1
2001–02	Jarome Iginla	Calgary Flames	RW	1
2002–03	Markus Naslund	Vancouver Canucks	LW	1
2003–04	Martin St. Louis	Tampa Bay Lightning	RW	1
2004–05	Season cancelled due to the 2004–05 NHL lockout			
2005–06	Jaromir Jagr	New York Rangers	RW	3
2006–07	Sidney Crosby	Pittsburgh Penguins	C	1
2007–08	Alexander Ovechkin	Washington Capitals	LW	1
2008–09	Alexander Ovechkin	Washington Capitals	LW	2
As Ted Lindsay Award
2009–10	Alexander Ovechkin	Washington Capitals	LW	3
2010–11	Daniel Sedin	Vancouver Canucks	LW	1
2011–12	Evgeni Malkin	Pittsburgh Penguins	C	1
2012–13	Sidney Crosby	Pittsburgh Penguins	C	2
2013–14	Sidney Crosby	Pittsburgh Penguins	C	3
2014–15	Carey Price	Montreal Canadiens	G	1
2015–16	Patrick Kane	Chicago Blackhawks	RW	1
2016–17	Connor McDavid	Edmonton Oilers	C	1
2017–18	Connor McDavid	Edmonton Oilers	C	2
2018–19	Nikita Kucherov	Tampa Bay Lightning	RW	1
2019–20	Leon Draisaitl	Edmonton Oilers	C	1
2020–21	Connor McDavid	Edmonton Oilers	C	3
2021–22	Auston Matthews	Toronto Maple Leafs	C	1
2022–23	Connor McDavid	Edmonton Oilers	C	4
2023–24	Nathan MacKinnon	Colorado Avalanche	C	1
2024–25	Nikita Kucherov	Tampa Bay Lightning	RW	2
2025–26	Connor McDavid	Edmonton Oilers	C	5

== See also ==
- List of NHL awards
- Lists of NHL players
- List of NHL statistical leaders
