= Butterfly style =

Goaltending technique in ice hockey

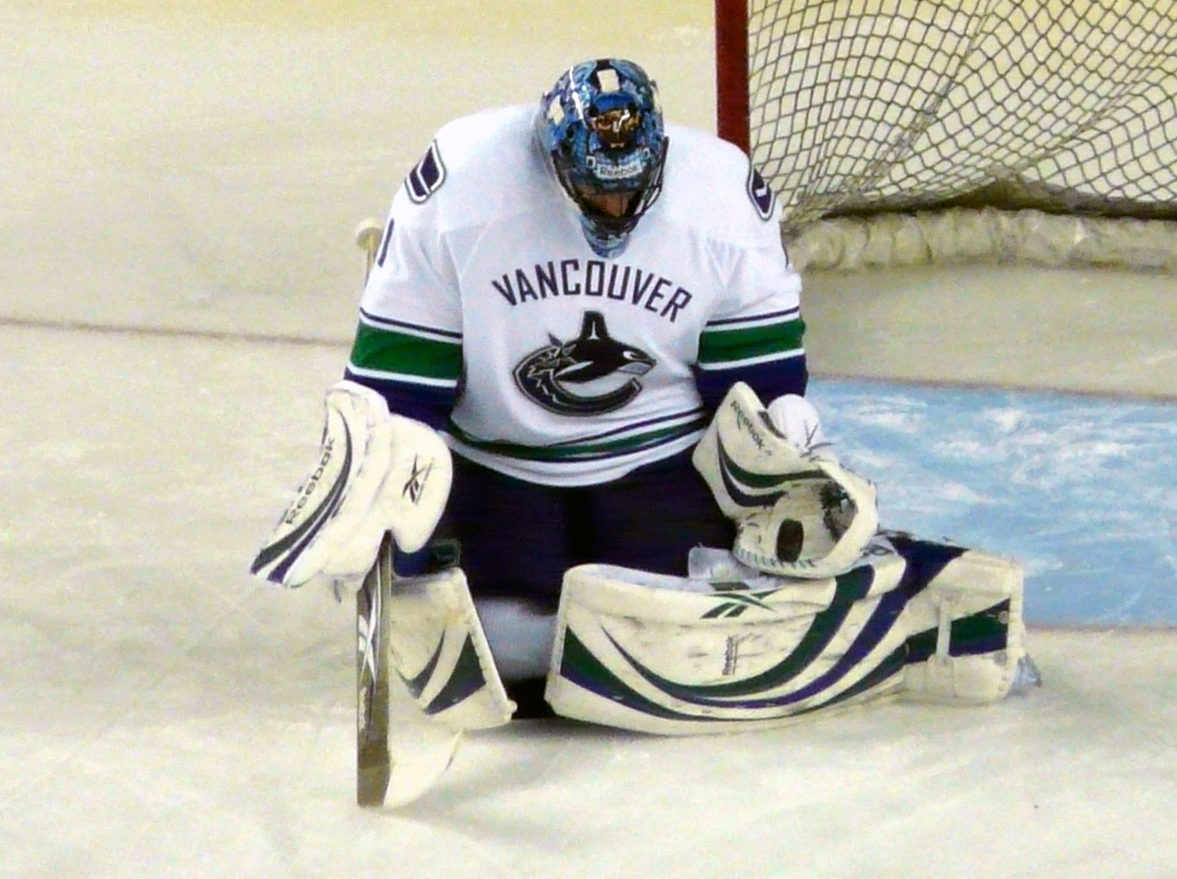
Roberto Luongo of the Vancouver Canucks in 2009, using the butterfly style of goaltending by dropping to his knees and flaring his legs outward

Braden Holtby of the Washington Capitals uses the butterfly style to seal off lower parts of the goal as he attempts to save the incoming shot from Bryan Rust (far right).

In ice hockey, butterfly style is a technique of goaltending distinguished by the goaltender guarding the lower part of the net by dropping to the knees to block attempts to score. The butterfly style derives its name from the resemblance of the spread goal pads and hands to a butterfly's wings. The butterfly style is contrasted with stand-up style, where most shots on a goal are stopped with the goaltender on their feet.

Many factors helped make it a de facto standard style of play today, including the popularization of the goalie mask by Jacques Plante, Vladislav Tretiak's outstanding use of the style at the 1972 Canada–USSR Summit Series, the National Hockey League (NHL) emergence of Tony Esposito in the 1970s and Dominik Hašek in the 1990s, the development of lightweight materials for pads, and the influence of professional goaltending coaches such as Warren Strelow and Benoit and François Allaire.

There are few who exclusively employ a stand-up style in the NHL. Although it is effective and popular among goaltenders, the butterfly style can leave the upper portion of the net more vulnerable to scoring attempts.

The modern profly derivative was made most popular by Patrick Roy and is the style most commonly used and taught. The profly style is a specialized progression of the butterfly style. The name derives from a goaltending leg pad model designed specifically for the use of the butterfly. The term eventually evolved into a style for goaltenders who tend to use the butterfly save technique as a base for the majority of their save selections.

The term "hybrid" is commonly used to measure how far a goaltender strays from using the butterfly technique as a base save. Some goaltending circles use the term "hybrid" as a middling term from a pure butterfly goaltender to a pure stand-up goaltender.

== History ==
Glenn Hall is generally thought to be the first goaltender to react to shots by dropping to his knees. This was remarkable because he did it without a mask. Other contemporaries, such as Terry Sawchuk and Jacques Plante (who, while not having invented the goalie mask, is credited with having popularized it) relied mostly on the stand-up style. Plante actually tried the butterfly style when sharing goaltending duties with Glenn Hall in St. Louis, but cautioned others against its use except under certain types of screened shots. Hall's innovation was improved upon later in the 1960s and 70s by Roger Crozier and Tony Esposito. In spite of their success, the butterfly fell out of favour until the emergence of Patrick Roy in the mid-1980s. This new, modern butterfly style has been referred to as the "profly" style.

Prominent advocates of the "profly" progression of the butterfly include Canadian coaches François Allaire and Benoit Allaire. Many believe that the advent of the Profly style was made possible by improved, heavily armored chest/arm pads and more protective face masks. Prior to these advancements, goaltenders wore chest/arm pads made of felt. To avoid injury, goalies had to trap all pucks with their gloves. Modern, lightweight plastics and energy absorbent foams allowed goaltenders to block and trap shots with their bodies. Equipment designers such as Michel Lefebvre (of Koho and Reebok fame), Michael Vaughn of Vaughn Custom Sports and the late Brian Heaton (of Brian's and Heaton fame) were at the forefront of the equipment advancements. Patrick Roy worked with the Allaire brothers and used Lefebvre-designed pads and Heaton-designed gloves in the late 1980s to modernize the style.

As in many arts, there is no universal agreement on style classifications with modern goaltending techniques. Modern hybrid coaches such as the late Warren Strelow worked with goaltenders associated with the profly style such as Miikka Kiprusoff. The butterfly is not a style but a save selection used by most goaltenders.

== Contrasted with stand-up ==
The butterfly style is contrasted with "stand-up" style goaltenders. The profly and the hybrid are more specialized progressions of collections of technical moves enveloped within the modern butterfly style. The butterfly term is often used to describe the newer profly style of goaltending refined by players including Ed Belfour, making it popular in the early 2000s by goaltenders such as Rick DiPietro, Martin Biron, Roberto Luongo, Marc-André Fleury, Marc Denis, Henrik Lundqvist and Jean-Sébastien Giguère, the latter being very profly-oriented.

== Profly, hybrid, and stand-up style comparison ==
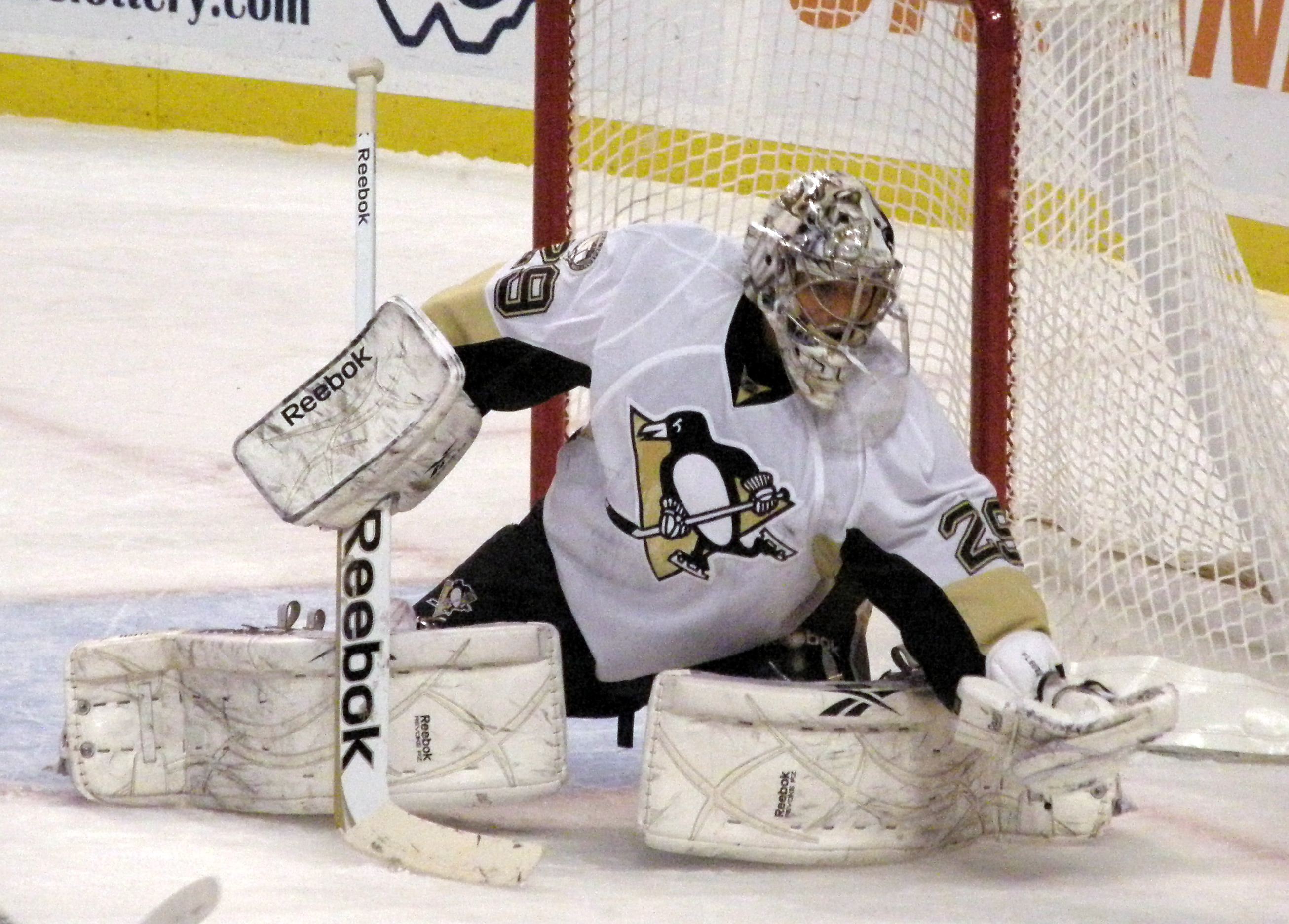
The deep 'blocking' butterfly stance used by Marc-André Fleury

Due to the common nature of the butterfly save, certain styles have been named based on the commonality of an individual goaltender's use of the butterfly. Common (but not exclusive) attributes of profly/blocking goaltenders are those have wide butterflies, use stiffer leg pads (often with no knee breaks), and tendencies to cover the lower portion of the net. Goaltenders who use the butterfly as the base of the majority of their saves are commonly referred to as "profly" or blocking-style goaltenders. Profly goalies tend to modify their save techniques to take up as much net as possible and leave shooters with the smallest space possible to shoot at. Profly goaltenders tend to also be very mobile when in the butterfly stance and excel at using butterfly-based movement techniques such as butterfly crawls and butterfly slides to move. NHL goaltenders such as Marc-André Fleury, Henrik Lundqvist and Roberto Luongo fit into the profly/blocking style of goaltending.

While there are many degrees a goaltender can be labelled as a "hybrid" from a "profly" goaltender, it is most commonly accepted that hybrid goaltenders are those who use their reflexes to make saves rather than depending on blocking with their bodies. Common (but not exclusive) attributes of hybrid goaltenders are narrower butterflies, the use of much more flexible leg pads, and the use of a variety of different save types (to include the butterfly). One common difference between a number of hybrid goaltenders and profly goaltenders is the tendency for hybrid goaltenders to return to the standing position after any given save, when able. While a profly goaltender may use a butterfly slide to move into position after a rebounded shot, a hybrid goaltender may opt to return to the standing position and T-push or shuffle into position. NHL goaltenders such as Ryan Miller, Evgeni Nabokov and Tim Thomas all fall into the "hybrid" model of goaltending. Thomas has coined his goaltending style as the "battlefly" style, emphasizing his aggressive tendencies and techniques.

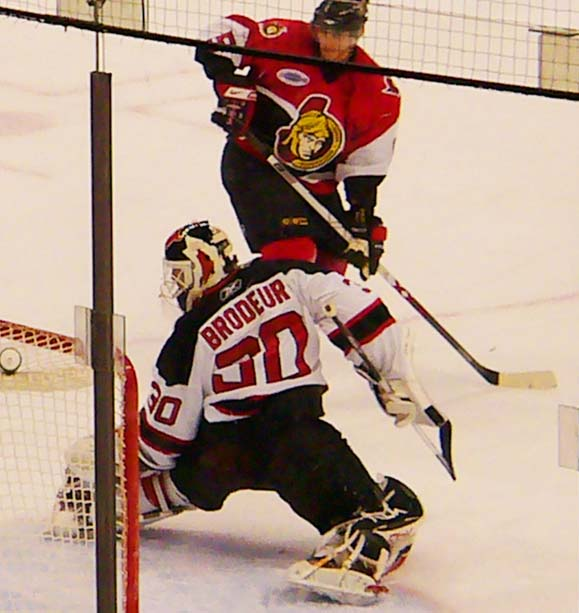
The semi-upright stance used by Martin Brodeur

The original "stand-up" style is considered obsolete by modern goaltending circles. However, there are still a few remaining goaltenders who are commonly said to be in the furthest hybrid spectrum opposite of a pure profly goaltender. These few are often considered to occupy the "modern stand-up" style of goaltending. A modern stand-up goaltender almost never completely commits to a full butterfly and stays on their feet as much as possible. Modern stand-up goaltenders commonly have excellent mobility on their skates and show above-average proficiency in puck-handling and making saves with their stick. Martin Brodeur was arguably the last stand-up goaltender remaining in the NHL.

== Technical moves ==
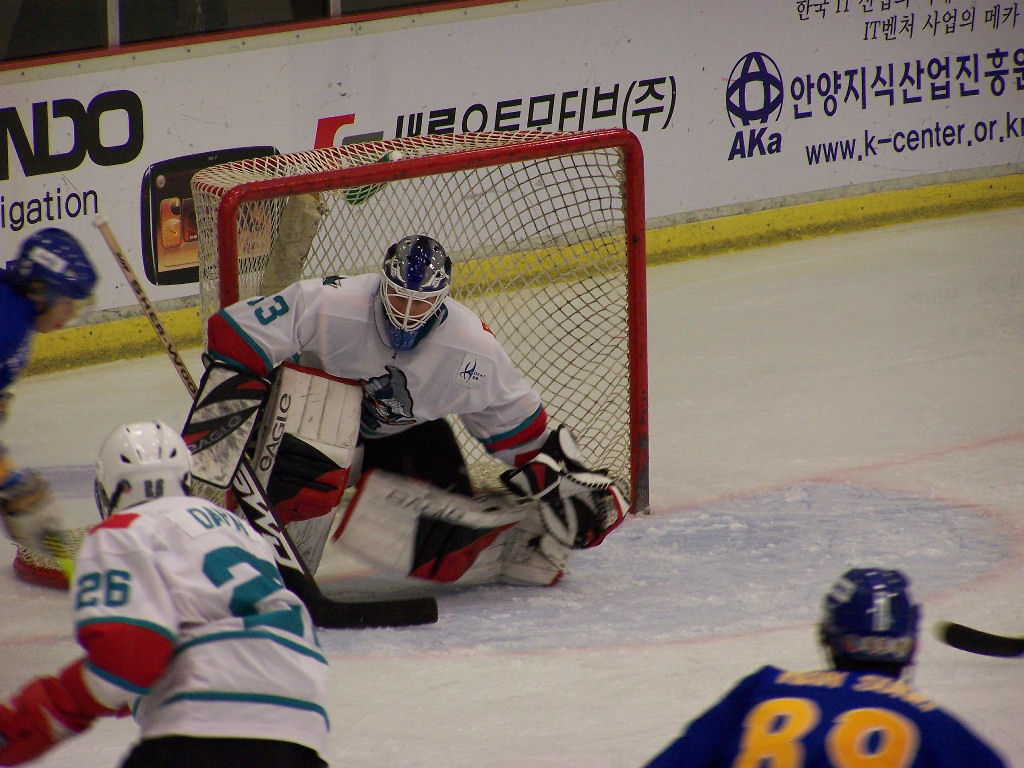
Wade Flaherty in 2008, using the V-H move ("split butterfly") to react to a scoring opportunity close to the net

There are a number of other recent technical innovations in response to the puck and shooter position on the ice.

A hallmark of profly is the puck-side leg staying down when recovering to the skates fully upright, to reposition for a rebound or second shot. Rather than picking up the leg closest to the puck, the leg furthest away from the puck is raised, then pushing the puck-side leg toward the puck. At this point, the goaltender may roll back onto the puck-side skate blade, facing the shooter in the familiar ready stance.

Profly goaltenders tend to have an easier time "skating" on their knees, also known as the "backside push", or the "butterfly slide". This term describes where one leg is down, and one is up. The goaltender pushes with their leg up laterally from the heel, laterally toward the down leg. This allows for a slide from the up leg to the down leg without getting off the ice completely. If a goaltender is on the inside corners or if the pad faces as in non-progressed "butterfly" styles, the push results in a tendency to roll over onto one's chest and belly.

The V-H move (also called the Split Butterfly or loading the post) is a move with which profly style goaltenders identify. This is a relatively recent tactical response to a shooter that is advancing from behind the net towards the front of the net, and has the option to pass. The goaltender places the knee farthest from the shooter down horizontally along the goal line. The knee closest to the puck remains vertical next to the goal post. The advantage is on coverage against quick shots to the near side of the net, while still covering the option to track passes to the front of the goal mouth.
