= Roberto Luongo =

Canadian ice hockey player (born 1979)

- Hockey Hall of Fame, 2022
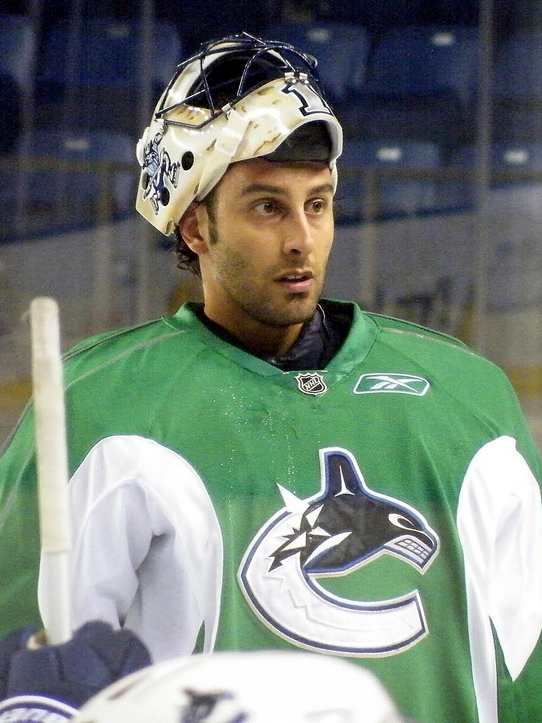
- Luongo practicing with the Vancouver Canucks in April 2009
- Born: April 4, 1979 (age 47) Montreal, Quebec, Canada
- Height: 6 ft 3 in (191 cm)
- Weight: 215 lb (98 kg; 15 st 5 lb)
- Position: Goaltender
- Caught: Left
- Played for: New York Islanders; Florida Panthers; Vancouver Canucks
- National team: Canada
- NHL draft: 4th overall, 1997; New York Islanders
- Playing career: 1999–2019

Roberto Luongo (Note: /luˈɒŋɡoʊ/, Italian: [ˈlwɔŋɡo], Neapolitan: [ˈlwoŋɡə]) (born April 4, 1979) is a Canadian former professional ice hockey player. He played 19 seasons in the National Hockey League (NHL) as a goaltender for the New York Islanders, Florida Panthers, and Vancouver Canucks. In 2022, Luongo was inducted into the Hockey Hall of Fame. Luongo is a two-time NHL All-Star (2004 and 2007) and winner of the William M. Jennings Trophy for backstopping his team to the lowest goals against average in the league (2011, with backup Cory Schneider). He was a finalist for several awards, including the Vezina Trophy as the league's best goaltender (2004, 2007, and 2011), the Lester B. Pearson Award as the top player voted by his peers (2004 and 2007), and the Hart Memorial Trophy as the league's most valuable player (2007). Luongo is third all-time in games played as an NHL goaltender (1,044) and fourth all-time in wins (489). He employed the butterfly style of goaltending.

Born in Montreal, Quebec, he played in the Quebec Major Junior Hockey League (QMJHL) for the Val-d'Or Foreurs and the Acadie-Bathurst Titan, winning back-to-back President's Cups and establishing the league's all-time playoff records for games played and wins. Following his second QMJHL season, Luongo was selected fourth overall by the Islanders in the 1997 NHL entry draft. After splitting his professional rookie season between the Islanders and their American Hockey League (AHL) affiliate, the Lowell Lock Monsters in 1999–2000, he was traded to the Panthers. In five seasons with Florida, Luongo established team records for games played, wins, and shutouts; despite several strong seasons, however, the Panthers remained a weak team and were unable to qualify for the Stanley Cup playoffs during Luongo's initial stint with the team. During the 2006 offseason, he was traded to the Canucks after failed contract negotiations with the Panthers.

In his first season in Vancouver, Luongo won 47 games, and was runner-up for both the Hart Memorial Trophy (league MVP) and Vezina Trophy (best goaltender). Following his second year with the Canucks, he became the first NHL goaltender to serve as a team captain since Bill Durnan in the 1947–48 season. Luongo served in that capacity for two seasons before resigning from the position in September 2010. In the subsequent 2010–11 season, he helped the Canucks to Game 7 of the Stanley Cup Final but lost to the Boston Bruins. During his eight-year tenure with Vancouver, Luongo became the team's all-time leader in wins and shutouts. He returned to the Panthers during the 2013–14 season, where he spent the remainder of his career, qualifying for the playoffs with the Panthers only once during that time. He was the last active goaltender to have played in the NHL in the 1990s. Following his playing career, Luongo joined the Panthers' front office as an executive, ultimately winning back-to-back Stanley Cup championships in 2024 and 2025.

Internationally, Luongo has competed for Team Canada in numerous tournaments. As a junior, he won a silver medal at the 1999 World Junior Championships, while being named Best Goaltender in his second tournament appearance. Luongo won two gold medals at the 2003 and 2004 World Championships and a silver in the 2005 World Championships. He also won the 2004 World Cup championship and appeared in the 2006 Winter Olympics in Turin as a backup to Martin Brodeur in both instances. He succeeded Brodeur as Canada's starting goaltender during the 2010 Winter Olympics in Vancouver, winning a gold medal. On January 7, 2014, he was named to the 2014 Canadian Olympic hockey team, where he won his second Olympic gold medal in a largely backup role to Carey Price.

== Early life ==
Luongo was born to Pasqualina and Antonio Luongo in Montreal, Quebec. His father is an Italian immigrant, born in Santa Paolina, Avellino. He worked in the construction and delivery of furniture, while Luongo's mother, an Irish-Canadian, worked in marketing with Air Canada. Antonio and Pasqualina married in Montreal after Antonio immigrated there in 1976.

Luongo has two younger brothers, Leo and Fabio, who also aspired to be goaltenders. Fabio progressed the further of the two, playing Junior A in the British Columbia Hockey League (BCHL) with the Williams Lake Timberwolves in 2004–05 before injuries ended his career. He has since become a Junior AAA coach, while Leo is a goaltending coach with HC Lugano. Luongo and his family lived in Saint-Leonard, Quebec, a borough north of Montreal with a strong Italian community, just four blocks away from Martin Brodeur, who became the goaltender for the New Jersey Devils six years before Luongo entered the NHL. Luongo is fluent in English, French and Italian. His father spoke Italian and his mother spoke English with a little French at home.

Luongo graduated from Montreal Francophone high school Antoine de St-Exupéry in 1996. He began playing organized hockey at the age of eight as a forward. His father taught all his sons soccer and Luongo played until he was 14, at which point he decided to concentrate on hockey. Although he initially had the desire to play in net, his parents wanted him to develop his skating first. Several years later, after Luongo was cut from a peewee team, he made the switch to goaltender. At 11 years old, his team's usual goaltender did not show up and after begging his mother, still hesitant about Luongo playing the position, he went in net and posted a shutout. In August 2009, the arena in which Luongo played his minor hockey in St. Leonard was named after him as the Roberto Luongo Arena. It is the second arena in the community to be named after an NHL goaltender after the Martin Brodeur Arena was renamed as such in 2000.

By 15, Luongo was playing midget with Montreal-Bourassa, the same team that produced NHL Quebecer goaltenders Brodeur and Félix Potvin. Luongo has credited Hall of Fame goaltender Grant Fuhr as his inspiration growing up, citing an admiration for his "spectacular glove saves". He had the opportunity to first meet Fuhr before a game against the Calgary Flames during his rookie season with the Islanders.

== Playing career ==
=== Junior career (1995–1999) ===
The Val-d'Or Foreurs made Luongo the highest-drafted goaltender in Quebec Major Junior Hockey League (QMJHL) history, at second overall, in 1995. He began his junior career in the 1995–96 season with Val-d'Or and posted six wins in 23 games played. As the team's starting goaltender the following season in 1996–97, he improved to a team-record 32 wins, and was awarded the Mike Bossy Trophy as the league's best professional prospect. After his performance at the 1997 CHL Top Prospects Game, opposing coach Don Cherry likened Luongo to Montreal Canadiens' Hockey Hall of Famer Ken Dryden, while NHL Central Scouting Bureau director Frank Bonello heralded him as a "franchise goaltender".

At the 1997 NHL entry draft, Luongo was selected in the first round, fourth overall, by the New York Islanders. The pick originally belonged to the Toronto Maple Leafs but was traded to the Islanders in exchange for Wendel Clark, Mathieu Schneider and D. J. Smith. At the time of the draft, Luongo was the highest-picked goaltender in NHL history, surpassing Tom Barrasso, John Davidson, and Ray Martynuik's fifth overall selections in 1983, 1973, and 1970 (Luongo's selection was later surpassed by Rick DiPietro's first overall selection by the Islanders in 2000). (Note: This acknowledgement excludes the NHL Amateur Drafts from 1963 to 1969. Michel Plasse was selected first overall in the 1968 NHL Amateur Draft at a time when teams obtained prospects through sponsoring them at a young age, rather than the draft process.)

Upon his draft, Luongo continued to play junior with the Foreurs in 1997–98. He recorded 27 wins and a 3.09 goals against average (GAA). His seven shutouts tied Nick Sanza's QMJHL record, set in 1974–75 (Adam Russo later tied it as well in 2002–03).

Although the Islanders planned to have Luongo play in the NHL for the 1998–99 season, an inconsistent performance at training camp led to Luongo's return to the QMJHL that season. Owing to having failed to come to terms on a contract before October 1, 1998, Luongo was not allowed to be called up to the Islanders from junior over the course of the subsequent season. He started the season with Val-d'Or but was traded to the Acadie-Bathurst Titan during the 1999 World Junior Championships for the remainder of the 1998–99 season. He went on to lead the Titan to his second consecutive President's Cup championship with a 2.74 GAA in 23 games. He finished his QMJHL playoff career with the all-time league record in games played (56), minutes played (3,264:22), wins (38) and shots faced (1,808).

=== New York Islanders (1999–2000) ===
After his performance at the 1999 World Junior Championships, Luongo was signed by the Islanders to a three-year, $2.775 million contract on January 8, 1999. The following season, he made his professional debut with the Lowell Lock Monsters, the Islanders' American Hockey League (AHL) affiliate. Early in the season, Luongo was called up to the Islanders on November 22, 1999, after a shoulder injury to back up Wade Flaherty. He made his NHL debut six days later on November 28, stopping 43 shots in a 2–1 win against the Boston Bruins. Luongo's early performances solidified him as the Islanders' starting goaltender over veteran Félix Potvin. Nearly a month after Luongo's debut in New York, Potvin was traded to the Vancouver Canucks on December 19 in exchange for backup goaltender Kevin Weekes. The next month, he recorded his first career NHL shutout in his eighth game, stopping 34 shots in a 3–0 victory over the Bruins on December 27.

In January 2000, Luongo was publicly criticized by Islanders general manager Mike Milbury for having gone looking for an apartment in New York on a game day before letting in seven goals to the Boston Bruins. Milbury told the media, "You can't do that in the NHL. You have to prepare yourself." Luongo defended himself by saying he did not divert from his usual game day routine by looking at just one apartment.

In the off-season, the Islanders selected goaltender Rick DiPietro with the first overall pick in the 2000 NHL entry draft. DiPietro's selection supplanted Luongo as the highest-drafted goaltender in NHL history and the Islanders' goaltender of the future. Consequently, Milbury traded Luongo to the Florida Panthers along with centre Olli Jokinen for winger Mark Parrish and centre Oleg Kvasha that same day on June 24, 2000. The deal would later be seen to have disproportionately benefited the Panthers, as both Jokinen and Luongo would eventually develop into star players, in contrast to Parrish and Kvasha. Later in his career, Luongo expressed surprise at the trade, saying that before the Islanders drafted DiPietro, he had believed the team was preparing to make him its starting goaltender for the upcoming season.

=== Florida Panthers (2000–2006) ===
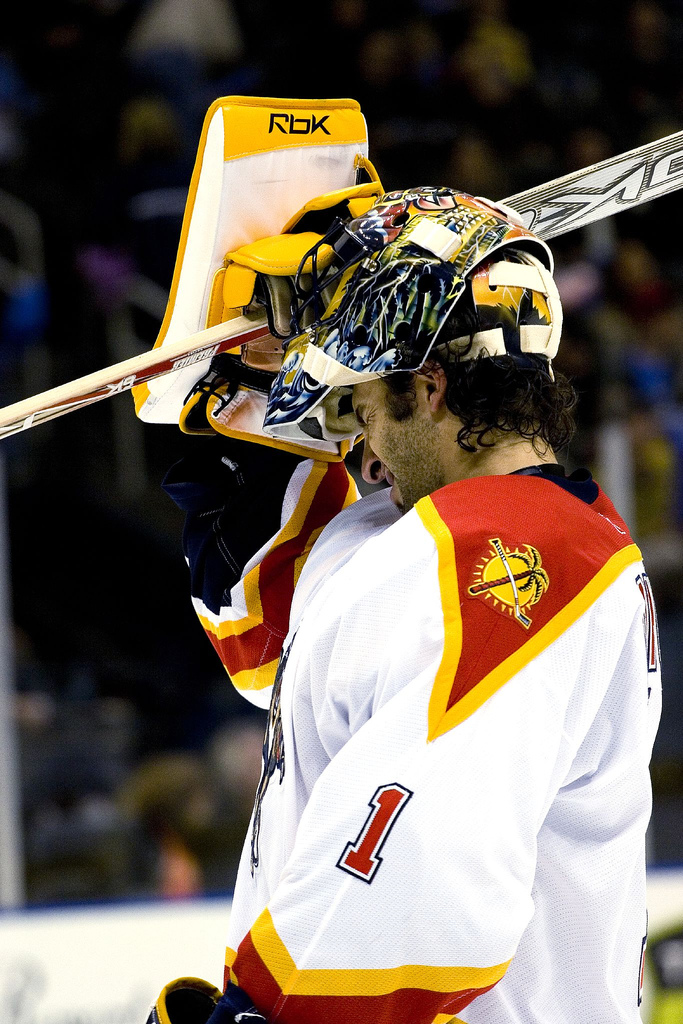
Luongo with the Panthers in November 2005. Luongo has always worn the number "1" in the NHL.

The Panthers' organization expressed high praise for Luongo following the trade. General manager Bryan Murray characterized him as "a franchise guy", while head coach Terry Murray added "He's the guy teams have to have to win the Stanley Cup." He entered his first training camp with the Panthers competing for the starting role with veteran goaltender Trevor Kidd; coach Terry Murray opted to begin the season with Kidd owing to his experience. Luongo made his first start with the Panthers on October 9, 2000, making 18 saves in a 4–2 loss to the Boston Bruins. When splitting the goaltending duties, Luongo went on to appear in 43 games, in comparison to Kidd's 42. He finished his 2000–01 rookie season (Luongo qualified as a rookie because he had not played in at least 26 games the previous season with New York) by notching a franchise record fifth shutout of the season in a 3–0 win against the New York Rangers on April 7, 2001. The total surpassed John Vanbiesbrouck's four-shutout mark, set in both the 1994–95 and 1997–98 seasons. He posted a 12–24–7 record with the struggling Panthers, who finished 12th in the Eastern Conference, while recording a 2.44 GAA. His .920 save percentage was sixth in the league and second all-time among rookie goaltenders, behind Manny Fernandez's mark set the previous season.

Approaching his third NHL season, Luongo agreed on a four-year contract extension with the Panthers on September 13, 2001. He was chosen to play in the inaugural NHL YoungStars Game in 2002 for Team Melrose, winning 13–7 over Team Fox. After appearing in 58 games in 2001–02, Luongo suffered a torn ligament in his right ankle in a game against the Montreal Canadiens on March 20, 2002. Sidelined for the remainder of the season, he finished with a 16–33–4 record, a 2.77 GAA and .915 save percentage. Luongo returned in 2002–03 to a heavier workload, playing a 65-game season. He had a franchise record-setting shutout streak that lasted 144:51 minutes; it was snapped on January 20, 2003, against the Montreal Canadiens.

In his fourth season with the Panthers (2003–04), Luongo emerged with his first Vezina Trophy and Lester B. Pearson Award nominations as the top goaltender and top player as selected by the players, respectively. Playing in 72 games, he set NHL marks for most saves and shots faced in a single season with 2,303 and 2,475, respectively. Both marks were previously set by former Islanders teammate Félix Potvin in 1996–97 as a Toronto Maple Leaf. His resulting .931 save percentage was first among those goaltenders with at least 50 starts, and set a Panthers franchise record, breaking Vanbiesbrouck's .924 mark, set in 1993–94. His seven shutouts furthered his franchise record and was good enough for fifth in the league. At mid-season, he was named to his first NHL All-Star Game, held in February 2004. Competing for the Eastern Conference, he won the Goaltenders Competition segment of the SuperSkills Competition, allowing the fewest goals on goaltender-related events. The following day, he played in the third period of the All-Star Game and helped the East to a 6–4 win against the West. At the end of the season, he was named to the second NHL All-Star team, but lost the Vezina Trophy to fellow Montreal-native Martin Brodeur of the New Jersey Devils, while Martin St. Louis of the Tampa Bay Lightning won the Pearson Award.

Owing to the 2004–05 NHL lockout, Luongo was inactive, with the exception of two international tournaments, the 2004 World Cup and the 2005 World Championships. With the NHL set to resume in 2005–06, Luongo was without a contract. After negotiations failed, the Panthers filed for arbitration on August 11, 2005. The process awarded Luongo a one-year, $3.2 million contract on August 25.

On April 13, 2006, Luongo became the Florida Panthers’ all-time wins leader, passing Vanbiesbrouck, with his 107th win with the team – a 5–4 overtime victory against the Ottawa Senators. He went on to post 35 wins, breaking Vanbiesbrouck's 27-win single-season Panthers mark, set in 1996–97. Set to become a free agent for the second consecutive off-season, he could not come to an agreement with the Panthers, having formally turned down a five-year, $30 million contract offer in January 2006. It was also reported that among Luongo's demands were that backup goaltender Jamie McLennan be re-signed, his long-time goaltending coach François Allaire be hired and that a public statement be released that he would not be traded until the no-trade clause of his contract took effect.

=== Vancouver Canucks (2006–2014) ===
Prior to the start of the 2006–07 season, Panthers general manager Mike Keenan traded Luongo to the Vancouver Canucks on June 23, 2006. He was packaged with defenceman Lukáš Krajíček and a sixth round draft pick (Sergei Shirokov) in exchange for forward Todd Bertuzzi, defenceman Bryan Allen and goaltender Alex Auld. Immediately following the deal, Vancouver signed Luongo to a four-year, $27 million deal. He expressed surprise, claiming that he and the Panthers were very close to a deal the day before the trade.

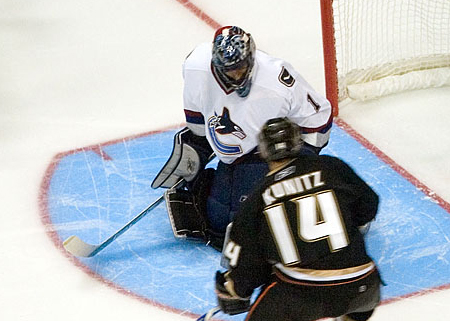
Luongo with Chris Kunitz of the Anaheim Ducks in a pre-season game at the lip of his crease in September 2006

Luongo's arrival in Vancouver ended a seven-and-a-half-year period of instability for Canucks netminding, with a total of 18 goaltenders having played for the club since Kirk McLean's departure in 1998. General manager Brian Burke had coined the term "goalie graveyard" during his tenure in Vancouver to describe the club's goaltending fortunes. Luongo recorded a 3–1 win against the Detroit Red Wings in his Canucks debut on October 5, 2006. Later in the month, he notched his first shutout with the Canucks, stopping 32 shots in a 5–0 win over the Chicago Blackhawks on October 25. On January 9, 2007, Luongo was voted in as a starting goaltender for the first time in his career for the Western Conference All-Stars. Six days after the announcement, he was hospitalized after taking a puck to the throat in practice. He spent the night in the intensive care unit for fears his windpipe would swell and become blocked. Discharged from the hospital on game day, Luongo recorded a shutout that night against the Montreal Canadiens on January 16, 2007.

During the 2007 NHL All-Star Game in Dallas, Luongo was named the Skills Competition's top goaltender and helped the West to a 12–9 win over the East. Late in the season, Luongo recorded his franchise record-setting 39th win in a 2–1 overtime victory on March 9 against the San Jose Sharks. He surpassed Kirk McLean's 38-win mark set in 1991–92. He went on to finish with a career-high 47 wins, one shy of league-leader Martin Brodeur, who broke Bernie Parent's 33-year-old NHL record of wins in a season. Luongo and Brodeur are considered, however, to have been given an advantage to Parent with the inauguration of the shootout that season by the NHL, allowing more games to be decided with wins, as opposed to ties. In addition to his 47 wins, Luongo recorded a 2.29 GAA (which was at that time, a personal best) and a team-record .921 save percentage (surpassing Dan Cloutier's .914 save percentage in 2003–04; later broken by Cory Schneider's .929 save percentage in 2010–11). He won three team awards – the Cyclone Taylor Trophy as MVP, the Molson Cup as the player with the most three-star selections, and the Most Exciting Player Award. He led the Canucks to a Northwest Division title and what was then a franchise record of 105 points, The team was seeded third in the Western Conference.

The 2007 playoffs marked Luongo's first NHL postseason appearance. Facing the sixth-seeded Dallas Stars in the opening round, he almost set an NHL record for most saves in a playoff game in his postseason debut. He stopped 72 shots, en route to a 5–4 quadruple overtime victory, one save shy of Kelly Hrudey's 73-save mark set in 1987. Luongo went on to win his first playoff series as the Canucks eliminated the Stars in seven games. They were, however, defeated in the second round by the second-seeded and eventual Stanley Cup champions Anaheim Ducks. Luongo put forth a losing 56-save performance in the deciding fifth game against the Ducks. After the game ended in regulation at a 1–1 tie, he missed the first three minutes of the first overtime period to what was first believed to be an equipment malfunction. However, after the series ended, it was revealed that Luongo, instead, had an untimely case of diarrhea. The Canucks lost the game 2–1 in the second overtime when Luongo took his eye off the puck to look at the referee, believing a penalty should have been issued to the Ducks on a play in which Canucks forward Jannik Hansen was hit by Ducks forward Rob Niedermayer. With Luongo not paying attention, Ducks defenceman Scott Niedermayer shot the puck from the point to score the series-winning goal.

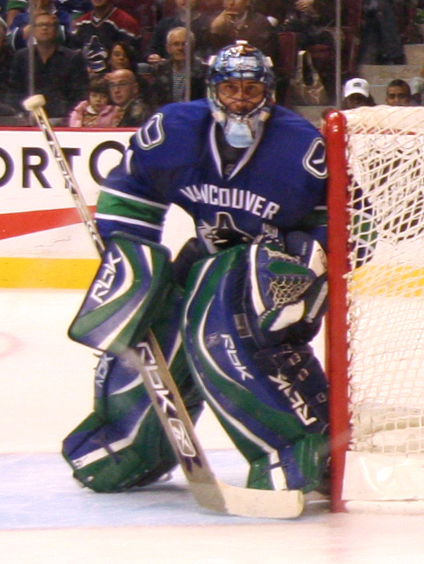
Luongo with the Canucks in October 2007

At the end of the season, Luongo was nominated for three major NHL awards: the Vezina Trophy as the top goaltender, Lester B. Pearson Award as the most outstanding player judged by members of the NHLPA and Hart Memorial Trophy as the league's regular season MVP. However, Luongo finished second in the voting for all three awards, behind Martin Brodeur of the New Jersey Devils for the Vezina and Sidney Crosby of the Pittsburgh Penguins for the Hart and Pearson.

Luongo kept pace statistically with his previous season's work in 2007–08 and continued to set significant marks, including a three-game shutout streak spanning 210:34 in late-November (breaking the Canucks' previous franchise record of 184:20 set by Ken Lockett in 1975). He was voted in as the 2008 NHL All-Star Game's Western Conference starting goaltender for the second consecutive season, although he did not attend in order to be with his pregnant wife in Florida.

With the Canucks battling for the Northwest Division title all season long, a losing streak that saw Luongo win only one of his final eight starts caused the Canucks to miss the playoffs altogether by just three points. Nevertheless, he received his second consecutive team MVP and Molson Cup awards. He also finished seventh in Vezina Trophy balloting.

On September 30, 2008, prior to the start of the 2008–09 season, Vancouver Canucks general manager Mike Gillis and head coach Alain Vigneault named Luongo the 12th captain in team history, replacing the departed Markus Näslund. The decision was unconventional, as league rules forbid goaltenders from being captains. As such, Luongo became only the seventh goaltender in NHL history to be named a captain, and the first since Bill Durnan captained the Montreal Canadiens in 1947–48 (after which the league implemented the rule). In order to account for the league rule, Luongo did not perform any of the on-ice duties reserved for captains and did not wear the captain's "C" on his jersey. Instead he incorporated it into the artwork on the front of one of his masks which he occasionally wore for the early months of the 2008–09 season. Canucks defenceman Willie Mitchell was designated to handle communications with on-ice officials, while defenceman Mattias Öhlund was responsible for ceremonial faceoffs and other such formalities associated with captaincy. Centre Ryan Kesler was chosen along with Mitchell and Öhlund as the third alternate captain.

A month into the 2008–09 season, Luongo began a shutout streak that lasted three games against the Nashville Predators, Phoenix Coyotes, and the Minnesota Wild, akin to the feat he accomplished in the same month of November the previous year. His overall shutout streak was snapped at 242:36 minutes, in a 2–1 shootout loss against the Colorado Avalanche, surpassing the Canucks record he set the previous season. Later that month, on November 22, Luongo left a game versus the Pittsburgh Penguins after suffering an adductor strain in his groin. Initially listed as week-to-week, he attempted what was considered an early comeback within two weeks of the injury, but suffered a setback during a team practice on December 10, leaving early in discomfort. After missing 24 games, Luongo made his return on January 15, 2009, in a 4–1 loss to the Phoenix Coyotes. While injured, Luongo was chosen for the fourth time to the NHL All-Star Game in 2009 as the lone Canucks representative. Despite speculation he would have to miss his second straight All-Star Game, Luongo recovered in time and took part in a 12–11 shootout loss to the Eastern Conference. He finished the season with back-to-back shutouts in the final two games against the Los Angeles Kings and Colorado Avalanche to establish a new career-high of nine shutouts on the season, breaking Dan Cloutier's previous franchise single-season shutout record of seven, set in 2001–02. Winning their second Northwest Division title in three years, Luongo and the Canucks returned to the playoffs after a one-year absence as the third seed in the West.

During the 2009 playoffs, he led the Canucks to a first round sweep of the sixth-seeded St. Louis Blues. The Canucks then faced the fourth-seeded Chicago Blackhawks in the second round, which Chicago ultimately won in six games. Luongo was heavily criticized following his performance in the sixth and deciding game, allowing seven goals in the 7–5 loss to seal the 4–2 series defeat. In a post-game interview, Luongo told reporters that he "let [his] teammates down". Many in the Vancouver media were quick to suggest trading Luongo, arguing that his large salary could be better spent, while pointing to several successful teams with relatively low-salary goaltenders. Nevertheless, Luongo was presented at the year-end awards ceremony with the Scotiabank Fan Fav Award, a fan-voted award in its inaugural year for the league's favourite player. Also finishing fourth in Vezina Trophy voting, he missed out on his second nomination in three years by one vote, behind Niklas Bäckström of the Minnesota Wild, Steve Mason of the Columbus Blue Jackets and trophy-winner Tim Thomas of the Boston Bruins.

With one season left on his original four-year deal with the Canucks, Luongo and agent Gilles Lupien began contract negotiations with general manager Mike Gillis in the 2009 off-season. At the time of the 2009 NHL entry draft, ESPN reported that Luongo and the Canucks had agreed on a long-term extension to be announced on July 1. The report was, however, denied by both Lupien and Gillis. A little over a month later in early August, Gillis told Vancouver sports radio station TEAM 1040 in an interview that he was "philosophically" close to a deal with Luongo to be signed before the upcoming 2009–10 season. That same month, while at Team Canada's summer camp for the 2010 Winter Olympics, Luongo set a September 13 deadline to sign a contract before the Canucks' training camp began, explaining that he "will not be negotiating during the season ... [not wanting] that distraction". Several days later, on September 2, the Canucks announced that they had signed Luongo to a 12-year contract extension worth $64 million for a $5.33 million annual salary cap hit. The front-loaded deal, which would expire by the time Luongo is 43 and includes a no-trade clause, saw him make $10 million in 2010–11, then approximately $6.7 million annually through to 2017–18, $3.3 million and $1.6 million the subsequent two seasons, before tailing off to $1 million for the final two years. The contract contains two additional clauses to circumvent the no-trade clause that would have allowed Luongo to facilitate a trade after the fifth year and for the Canucks to also facilitate a trade after the seventh year.

Nearly a month into the 2009–10 season, on October 25, 2009, Luongo recorded his 21st shutout as a Canuck (48th career) in a 2–0 win against the Edmonton Oilers, surpassing Kirk McLean as the franchise shutouts leader. The following game against the Detroit Red Wings on October 27, he suffered a rib injury that was revealed the following day to be a hairline fracture. Luongo originally injured his rib two games prior against the Toronto Maple Leafs on October 24 after taking a shot in the chest from Leafs' forward Niklas Hagman. The injury was re-aggravated during the Detroit game during a collision with Red Wings forward Todd Bertuzzi. He returned to the lineup on November 10 against the St. Louis Blues after missing six games. On January 7, 2010, Luongo recorded his 50th career shutout in a 4–0 win against the Phoenix Coyotes. Despite recording the second 40-win season of his career, Luongo finished with his worst statistical season as a Canuck, heavily affected by a poor second-half. Pulled seven times in 68 appearances, he recorded a 2.57 GAA and a .913 save percentage. In the subsequent 2010 playoffs, the Canucks defeated the Los Angeles Kings in six games only to be defeated by the Chicago Blackhawks for the second year in a row.

In the 2010 off-season, it was speculated by many in the media whether Luongo would remain Vancouver's captain, citing the added pressure of the goaltending position. After the Canucks' 3–1 series deficit in the second round, Luongo ceased to make himself available for pre-game interviews – a customary practice for goaltenders, but not for captains. When asked after the Canucks' elimination whether he thought he should remain team captain, he told reporters he did not think it was an issue. However, Gillis, who appointed him captain two seasons prior, asserted it was a topic to be addressed in the off-season. On September 13, 2010, Luongo confirmed he was stepping down, stating that "Serv[ing] as captain...in a Canadian city for a team with such passionate fans is a privilege and an experience I will always take pride in. I will continue to be a leader on this team and support my teammates the same way I always have while focusing on our ultimate goal." Centre Henrik Sedin, who won the Hart Trophy for the 2009–10 season, was named Luongo's successor in a pre-game ceremony to the Canucks' season-opener. Also in the 2010 off-season, Gillis fired Luongo's goaltending coach Ian Clark and hired Roland Melanson in his place. Luongo had been a personal friend of Clark's and publicly stated being surprised and disappointed with the switch. The decision to hire Melanson was largely precipitated on his willingness to work with Luongo on a full-time basis – something Clark was unable to do. Despite the coaching change at the club level, Luongo retained Clark as his personal coach for his summer training.

He began working with Melanson leading up to the 2010–11 season and employed several changes in his playing style, which included playing deeper into his crease instead of challenging shooters. Luongo was named the NHL's Second Star of the Month for December 2010. He posted an 11–1–2 record with a 2.07 GAA, a .922 save percentage and one shutout within that month. During the month, he started a 21-game regulation unbeaten streak that lasted until a loss against the St. Louis Blues on February 14, 2011. Luongo's record in that span was 16 wins and 5 overtime or shootout losses. Later in the campaign, he recorded his 300th career win against the Los Angeles Kings on March 5, 2011. He became the sixth-youngest goaltender to reach the milestone and the 25th overall. 2010–11 campaign constituted a decreased workload for Luongo, as he appeared in 60 games. Team management had asserted at the beginning of the campaign that rookie backup Cory Schneider would be given the opportunity to play in 20 to 25 games. Luongo finished the season with a league-leading 38 wins, along with 22 losses (15 in regulation and 7 in overtime or a shootout). His career-high 2.11 GAA ranked second in the league, behind Tim Thomas' 2.00, and set a Canucks record, surpassing Dan Cloutier's 2.27 GAA, set in 2003–04. While his .928 save percentage improved upon his team-record setting .921 in 2006–07, it was bettered by one-hundredth of a point by Schneider. Together, Luongo and Schneider won the William M. Jennings Trophy for leading the Canucks to the lowest GAA in the league; their combined 2.20 GAA was one-tenth better than the Boston Bruins's second-place goaltending tandem of Tim Thomas and Tuukka Rask. Luongo helped the Canucks to their first Presidents' Trophy in team history with an NHL-best and franchise-record 54 wins and 117 points. His efforts in the regular season earned him his third career Vezina Trophy nomination, alongside the Boston Bruins' Tim Thomas and the Nashville Predators' Pekka Rinne.

Entering the 2011 playoffs as the first seed in the West and Presidents' Trophy winners, the Canucks were matched against the Chicago Blackhawks for the third straight year, this time in the first round. After opening the series with three straight wins, the Canucks lost the next three against the eighth-seeded and defending Stanley Cup champion Blackhawks, forcing a seventh game. After he was pulled in favour of Schneider during Games 4 in Chicago and 5 in Vancouver – having allowed six goal on 28 shots and four goals on 12 shots, respectively – Luongo started Game 6 in Chicago on the bench. During the third period, Schneider suffered a lower-body injury on a Michael Frolík penalty shot goal, forcing Luongo to finish the game. He made 12 saves in relief of Schneider before Blackhawks forward Ben Smith scored in overtime. Although Schneider was available to play for Game 7, Canucks' head coach Alain Vigneault chose to start Luongo. He made 31 saves in the deciding game, helping the Canucks to a 2–1 overtime win. His efforts included a cross-ice save on a one-timer from Blackhawks forward Patrick Sharp during a Blackhawks powerplay early on in the extra period. Going head-to-head against fellow Vezina Trophy nominee Pekka Rinne and the Nashville Predators in round two, Luongo kept the fifth-seeded Predators to 11 goals over six games to help the Canucks advance to the third round for the first time in 17 years. He maintained his stellar performance in the Western Conference Finals against the second-seeded San Jose Sharks, allowing 13 goals over five contests, including 54 saves in the fifth and deciding match, a game that went to double overtime. Luongo's efforts helped the Canucks reach the Stanley Cup Final for the first time in 17 years. He opened the series against the Boston Bruins stopping all 36 shots in a 1–0 win for his third shutout of the postseason in Game 1 along with a 3–2 overtime win in Game 2.

As the series shifted to Boston's TD Garden for games three and four with a two-games-to-none Canucks lead, Luongo surrendered eight goals in Game 3 as the Bruins defeated the Canucks 8–1, cutting the Canucks series lead from 2–0 to 2–1. The following contest also, he was pulled for the third time in the playoffs and first time in the Finals after allowing four goals on 20 shots as the Canucks were defeated by the Bruins 4–0, resulting in a 2–2 tie in the series. Amidst heavy scrutiny from the media and Canucks fans after the two blowout losses in Games 3 and 4, Luongo recovered for Game 5 in Vancouver, stopping all 31 Bruins shots in a 1–0 win for a 3–2 series lead. It was his 15th win and fourth shutout of the 2011 postseason and second of the Stanley Cup Final, tying both of Kirk McLean's single-year playoff team records, previously set in 1994. Luongo joined Frank McCool as the only goaltender in NHL history to have two 1–0 shutouts in the same Stanley Cup Final series as McCool's 1–0 victories came 66 years earlier in 1945. With an opportunity to clinch the Stanley Cup in Game 6 in Boston, however, he was pulled again in favour of Schneider after allowing three goals on eight shots in less than three minutes in the first period; the game ended in a 5–2 loss, forcing a Game 7 back home in Vancouver. Despite his struggles in Game 6, he was named the starter for the deciding seventh game by head coach Alain Vigneault over Schneider. Although Luongo and the Canucks had a chance to clinch the Stanley Cup in Game 7 at home, the struggles continued for both Luongo individually and for the Canucks as a team as he allowed three goals (two scored by Bruins' centre Patrice Bergeron and one by winger Brad Marchand) on 20 shots, including one shorthanded goal by Bergeron before Marchand scored a second goal by an empty netter, as the Canucks lost the game 4–0 and the series 4–3 against the third-seeded Bruins, one win short of winning the Stanley Cup. Luongo had the chance of joining the Triple Gold Club as the first goaltender in this finals series had the Canucks won Game 6 or Game 7.

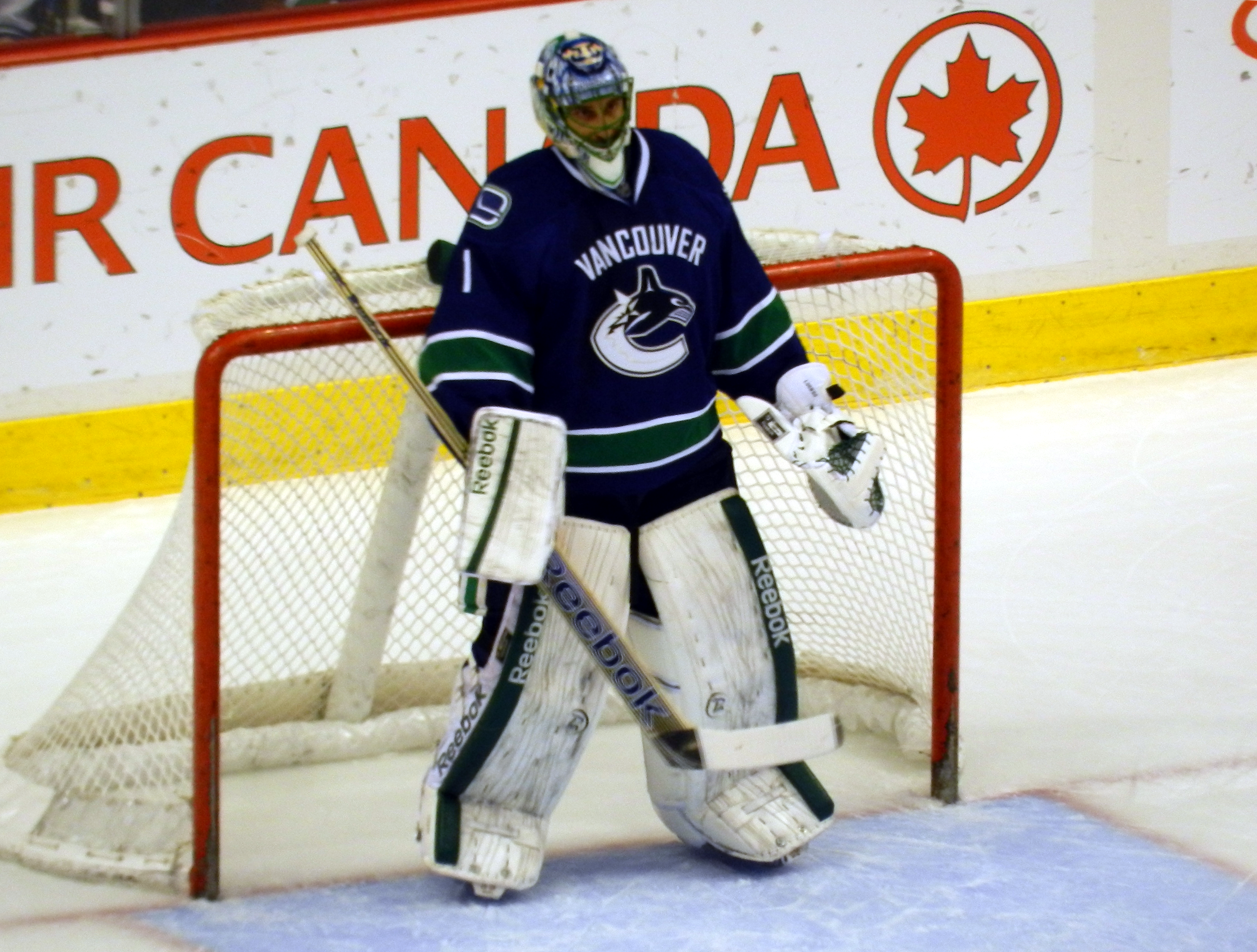
Luongo getting in position in his net during a game in February 2012

Nearly a month and a half into the 2011–12 season, Luongo suffered an upper-body injury that sidelined him for two games. The nature of the injury was unspecified, but was believed to have occurred during a game against his former team, the New York Islanders on November 13, 2011, when he appeared to be in discomfort. Prior to the injury, Luongo was struggling to perform with his statistics near the bottom of the league. Upon recovering, Schneider's play relegated Luongo to backup status for five games. By December 2011, he resumed as the team's starter with an improved performance. The following month, Luongo reached two milestones. On January 4, 2012, he became the 23rd goaltender in league history to play in his 700th game, a contest in which he recorded a 3–0 shutout against the Minnesota Wild. With his 212th victory as a Canuck on January 21 (a 4–3 win against the San Jose Sharks), he surpassed Kirk McLean as the most-wins goaltender in team history. Luongo accomplished the feat in 364 games, 152 less than McLean.

Facing the eighth-seeded and eventual Stanley Cup champion Los Angeles Kings in the opening round of the 2012 playoffs after helping the Canucks win a second consecutive Presidents' Trophy as the regular season champions, Luongo started the first two games and played well but his team lost both. Vigneault opted to start Schneider for the rest of the series, in order to give the Canucks some momentum on their side, and Luongo remained on the bench for the remainder of the series as the Kings won four games to one. Dressing as a backup for the Canucks' final three playoff games led many in the media to believe that Luongo would be traded in the off-season, in favour of Schneider, who recorded better regular season and playoff statistics than him in 2011–12. Asked about his role with the Canucks following the defeat, Luongo told reporters that he would waive his no-trade clause if his management asked him to do so. In June 2012, Schneider was signed to a three-year $12 million contract, which made Luongo expendable, but general manager Mike Gillis' efforts to trade Luongo were unsuccessful owing to his $64 million (U.S.), 12-year contract.

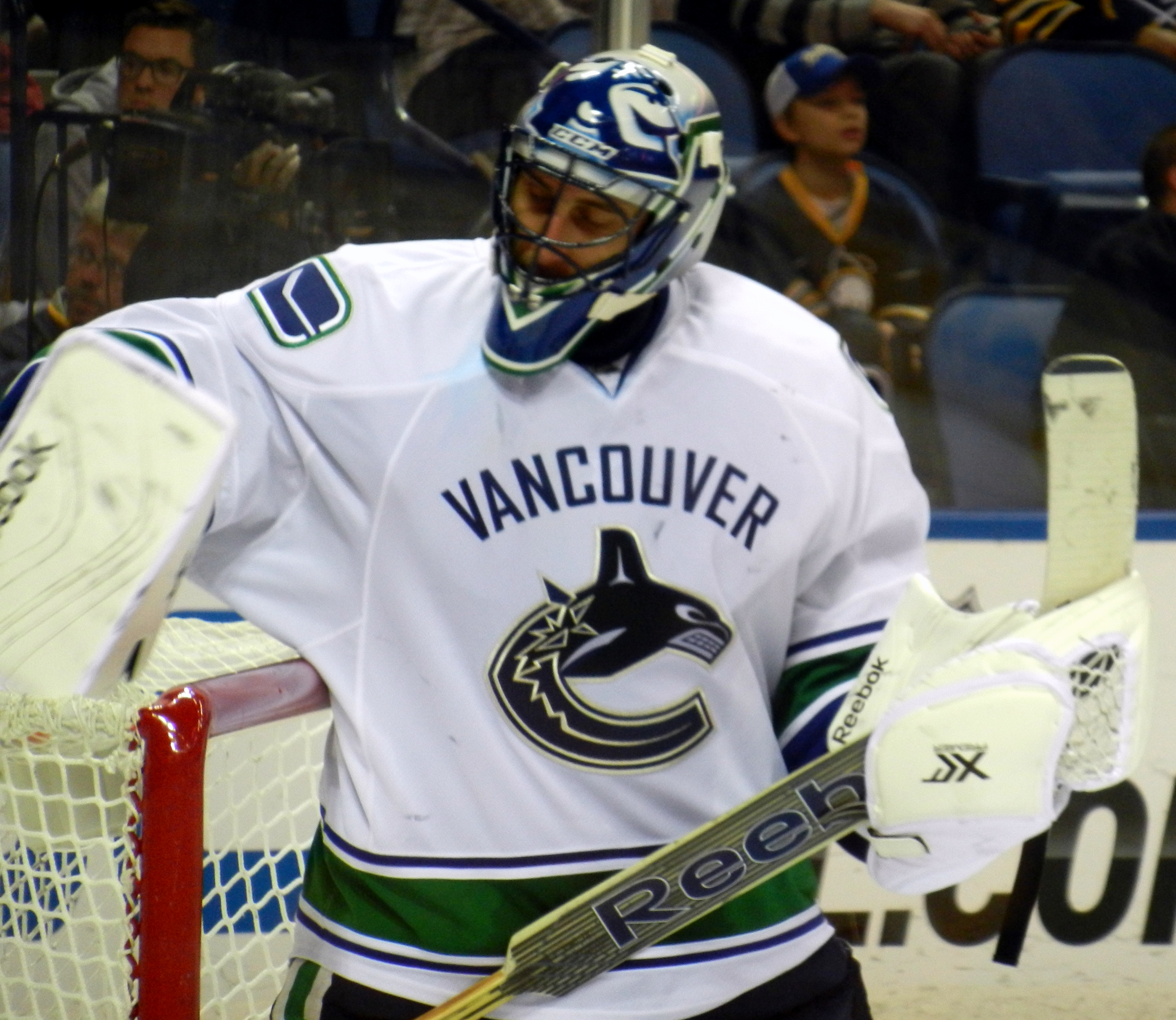
Luongo with the Canucks in October 2013

In the lockout-shortened 2012–13 season, both goaltenders split the playing duties although Schneider was the number one goaltender. Luongo handled his demotion with class and remained supportive of Schneider, soon calling the Canucks "Cory's team." Head coach Alain Vigneault said "Cory is our MVP and one of reasons why we got into playoffs. I've got a lot of faith in him and that's why we're going with him". In the opening round of the 2013 playoffs facing the San Jose Sharks, as Schneider had been injured near the end of the season, Luongo started the first two games and played well but his team lost both. Luongo came off the bench in game three after Schneider was pulled in the third period. Luongo was the backup in game four as the Canucks lost in overtime, ending his team's postseason in four straight games. Luongo put his penthouse up for sale, as it was accepted that he had likely played his final game as a Canuck. Although he had nine years left on a 12-year, $64-million contract, which represented a $5.33 million salary cap hit, general manager Mike Gillis remained confident of making a deal in the summer.

Schneider was unexpectedly traded to the New Jersey Devils on June 30, 2013, reinstating Luongo in the starting position for the 2013–14. John Tortorella, who had replaced Alain Vigneault as Canucks head coach after their first round sweep at the hands of the San Jose Sharks, chose rookie Eddie Läck to start in goal instead of Luongo in the Heritage Classic against the Ottawa Senators at BC Place. Tortorella's decision was unpopular with the crowd as they booed Läck, while Luongo was also unhappy as he had been looking forward to that game all season with it being outside.

=== Return to Florida (2014–2019) ===
On March 4, 2014, a day before the NHL trade deadline, Luongo was traded back to the Florida Panthers along with prospect Steven Anthony in exchange for goaltender Jacob Markström and centre Shawn Matthias. The Canucks retained part of Luongo's salary. Luongo was seen as key to helping build the Panthers into a strong contender.

On March 3, 2015, Luongo suffered a chipped bone in his shoulder in a 3–2 loss to the Toronto Maple Leafs as a result from taking a shot from Leafs' forward Leo Komarov. He would leave the game momentarily but then return to finish the game before missing the next six games. The 2014–15 season would end with the Panthers missing the playoffs for the third straight season and Luongo finishing with a 28–19–12 record, two shutouts, 2.35 GAA and .921 save percentage in 61 games.

Luongo ended the 2015–16 season playing in 62 games with a 35–19–6 record, four shutouts, 2.35 GAA and .922 save percentage to help the Panthers qualify for the playoffs for the first time since 2012. During the 2016 playoffs, the Panthers would go on to lose in the first round against Luongo's former team, the New York Islanders in six games with Islanders centre and captain John Tavares scoring the series-winning goal in double overtime of Game 6 to prevent the Panthers from forcing a seventh game.

In the 2016 off-season, it was revealed that Luongo underwent hip surgery, but would recover in time for the start of the 2016–17 season. The season would be a struggle for Luongo and the Panthers as a team as they would miss the playoffs and Luongo would finish with a 17–15–6 record with one shutout, 2.68 GAA and .915 save percentage in 40 games.

On December 4, 2017, in a 5–4 SO loss to the New York Islanders, Luongo suffered a torn groin as a result of sticking his leg out to make a save on a shot from Islanders' defenceman Ryan Pulock, causing him to miss the next 27 games. On April 5, 2018, Luongo played in his 1,000th NHL game in a 3–2 win over the Boston Bruins, becoming just the third goaltender in NHL history to do so, the other two being Patrick Roy and Martin Brodeur. At the conclusion of the 2017–18 season, Luongo was the Panthers' nomination for the Bill Masterton Memorial Trophy and eventually a finalist for the award by the NHL and became the franchise all-time leader in games played, wins, and shutouts. The season ended with the Panthers missing the playoffs by just one point in the standings. The Masterton Trophy would eventually go to New Jersey Devils forward Brian Boyle.

On February 10, 2019, Luongo played in his 1030th career game against the inner-state rival Tampa Bay Lightning, passing Roy for second all-time behind Brodeur, who played 1,266 games in his career. With a 4–3 win against the Colorado Avalanche on February 25, Luongo passed Ed Belfour for third-most wins as an NHL goaltender, once again only behind Patrick Roy and Martin Brodeur.

On June 26, 2019, Luongo announced his retirement from professional hockey, despite having three years left on his contract largely citing lingering effects from surgeries on his hip and groin the previous two seasons.

== International play ==
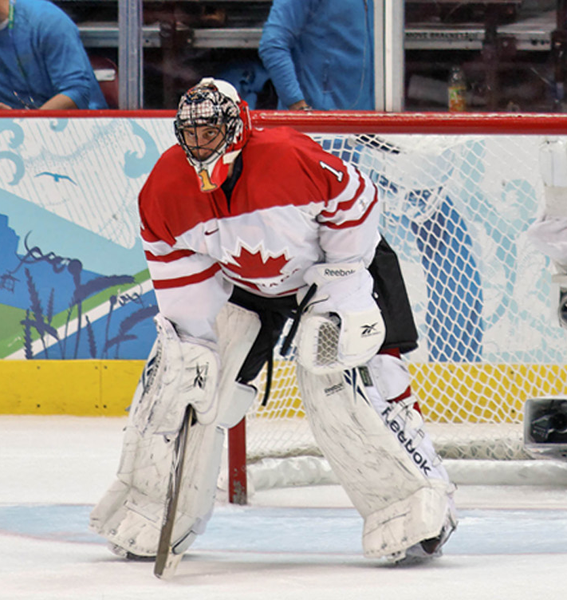
- Luongo during the quarterfinal against Russia at the 2010 Winter Olympics in Vancouver

Medal record

Representing Canada

Ice hockey

Olympic Games
Gold medal – first place	2010 Vancouver	
Gold medal – first place	2014 Sochi	

World Championships
Gold medal – first place	2003 Finland	
Gold medal – first place	2004 Czech Republic	
Silver medal – second place	2005 Austria	

World Cup
Gold medal – first place	2004 Canada	

World Junior Championships
Silver medal – second place	1999 Canada	

Representing Quebec

World U-17 Hockey Challenge
Bronze medal – third place	1995 Canada	

Luongo made his international debut at the 1995 World U-17 Hockey Challenge in Moncton, New Brunswick, with Team Québec, winning bronze. Three years later, he was named to the Canadian national junior team for the 1998 World Junior Championships in Finland. He played backup to Victoriaville Tigres goaltender Mathieu Garon, going winless in three appearances with a 3.70 GAA, as Canada finished in eighth place. Luongo became the starting goaltender the following year at the 1999 World Junior Championships in Winnipeg, Manitoba, appearing in seven of Canada's eight games. He recorded a shutout in the first game of the tournament against the Czech Republic, making 36 saves in a 0–0 tie. He went on to help Team Canada to the gold medal game against Russia, but lost in overtime, surrendering a goal to Artem Chubarov. With a 1.92 GAA and two shutouts, Luongo was given Best Goaltender and All-Star team honours.

Luongo first appeared with the Canadian men's team at the 2001 World Championships in Germany. He played backup to Fred Brathwaite of the Calgary Flames before injuring his finger during the first game of the qualification round against Switzerland on May 4, 2001.

During his next appearance at the 2003 World Championships in Finland, Luongo began the tournament as backup to the Phoenix Coyotes' Sean Burke. He earned wins against Latvia in the preliminaries and Switzerland in the qualifying round. During the semifinals against the Czech Republic, Luongo replaced Burke after he left the game with a lower-body injury eight minutes into the second period. Luongo allowed four goals in relief, but earned the win as Canada defeated the Czechs 8–4. With Burke still out for the gold medal game, Luongo made 49 saves against Sweden in a 3–2 overtime win. Despite Luongo's medal-round efforts, Burke was named the Best Goaltender for the tournament, as he played in the majority of Team Canada's games. The gold medal-winning 2003 team was later named the Canadian Press national sports team of the year on January 2, 2004.

Luongo made his third appearance at the World Championships in 2004 in the Czech Republic. He played in seven games as the starting goaltender, recording a 2.32 GAA and one shutout, as Canada captured its second straight gold medal at the tournament, beating Sweden 5–3 in the final. Several months later, Luongo competed for Team Canada in the 2004 World Cup as backup to Martin Brodeur of the New Jersey Devils. It marked Luongo's first international tournament in which all NHL players were eligible, as the annual World Championships conflict with the Stanley Cup playoffs. He had another opportunity to step in as the starting goaltender when Brodeur pulled out prior to the semi-final game against the Czech Republic due to a sprained wrist. Filling in for Brodeur, Luongo made 37 of 40 stops in a 4–3 overtime victory to put Team Canada into the finals against Finland. Brodeur returned for the championship game to backstop Team Canada to a 3–2 win.

Luongo appeared in his fourth World Championships in 2005. Owing to the 2004–05 NHL lockout, all NHL players were available for the tournament in Austria, and Luongo played backup to Brodeur. He appeared in two games, including a shutout win against Slovenia in the round-robin. Luongo earned a silver medal as Team Canada was shut out by the Czech Republic 3–0 in the final.

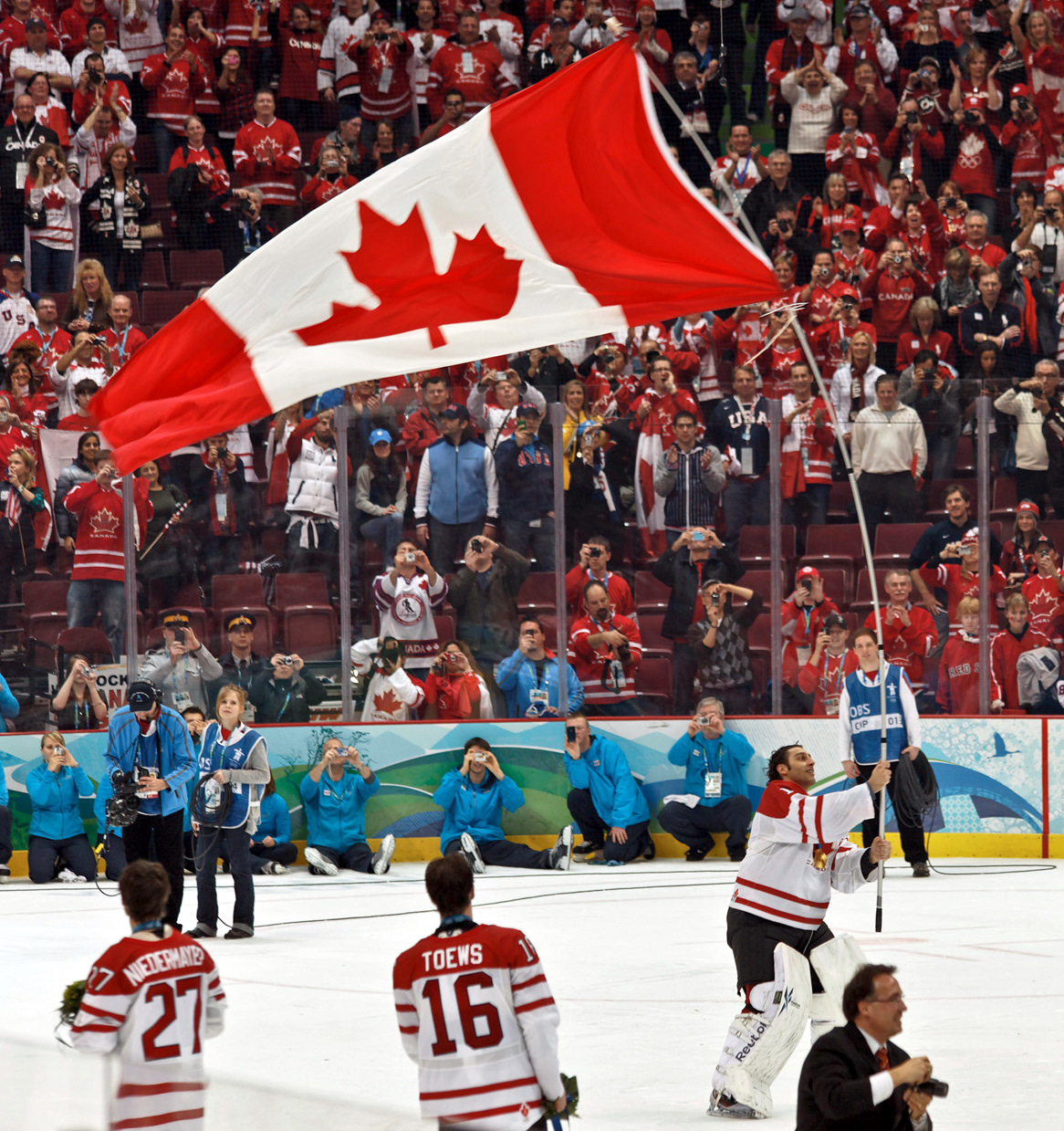
Luongo carrying the Canadian flag after the gold medal win against the United States at the 2010 Winter Olympics

Luongo was named to his first Olympic Games in 2006. The tournament was held in Turin, Italy, his country of cultural origin. He again played behind Brodeur and appeared in two games. He made his Olympic debut in the second game of the round-robin with a 5–1 win against Germany. His second appearance of the tournament was a loss to Finland, also in the round-robin.

Leading up to the 2010 Winter Olympics, to be held in Luongo's NHL hometown of Vancouver, Luongo and Brodeur were considered locks to be named to the national team heading into the summer orientation camp in August 2009 and speculation began as to who would be appointed the starting position. On December 31, 2009, Luongo was selected to Team Canada, along with Brodeur and Marc-André Fleury of the Pittsburgh Penguins as the three goaltenders. Luongo was given the start for the first game against Norway. He recorded his first Olympic shutout, making 15 saves in an 8–0 win to open the tournament. After Brodeur surrendered four goals in a 5–3 loss to the United States in their final preliminary game, Luongo replaced him as the starting goaltender. He helped Canada to four consecutive single-elimination game wins against Germany, Russia, Slovakia and the United States to capture the gold medal. During the semifinal against Slovakia, Luongo made a game-saving stop against Canucks teammate Pavol Demitra with nine seconds to go in regulation. With Slovakia's goaltender pulled and down by a goal, the puck bounced to Demitra by the side of the net. Out of position, Luongo managed to get his glove on the puck, deflecting it away from the net and preserving the win. In the subsequent gold medal game, Luongo made 34 saves in Canada's overtime win against the United States.

The following month, Luongo carried the torch into Robson Square in Downtown Vancouver for the 2010 Paralympics on March 11, 2010.

Four years later, Luongo was selected to Team Canada for his third straight Olympics. Heading into the Sochi Games as the incumbent starter, there was much debate among the media as to whether he or Montreal Canadiens goaltender Carey Price would play most of Canada's games.

== Playing style ==
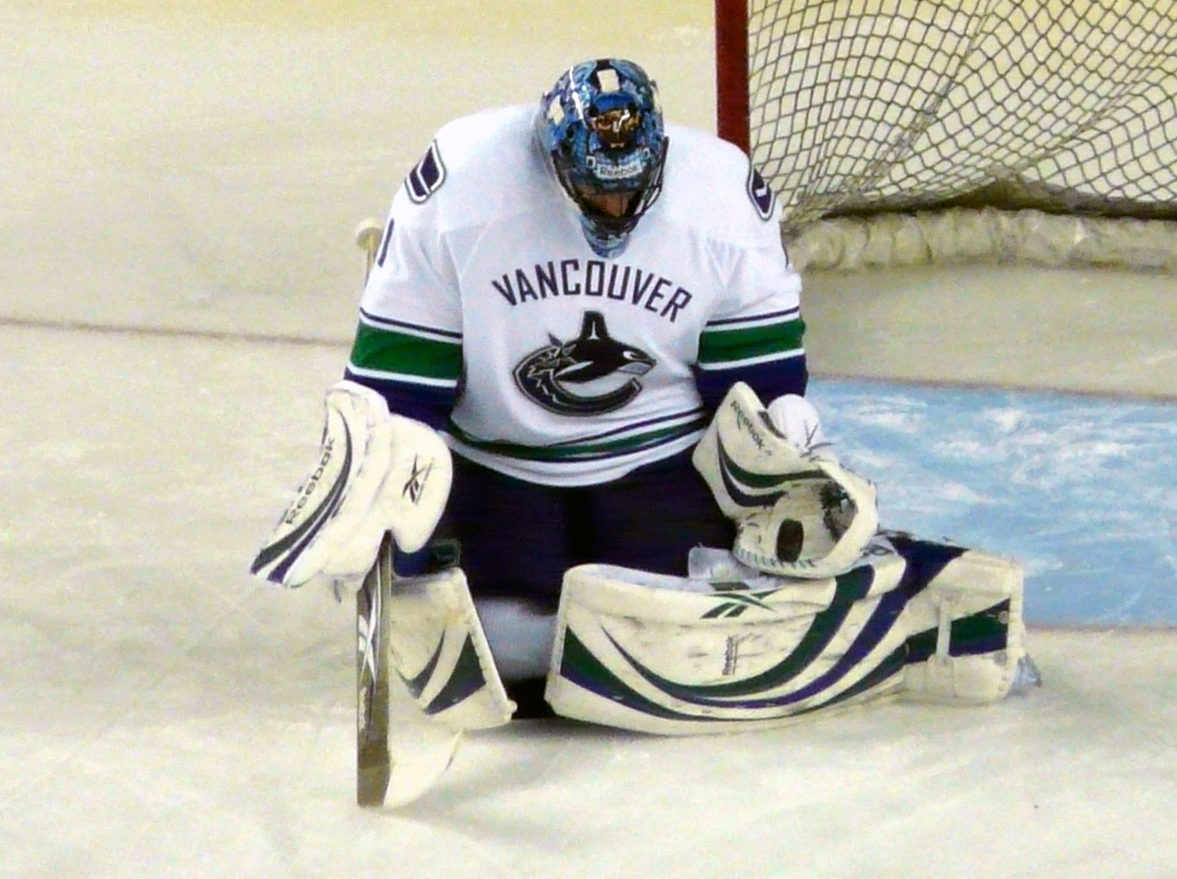
Luongo employing the butterfly position to make a save during a game in February 2009.

Luongo played in the butterfly style of goaltending, dropping to his knees with his skates pointing outwards and his pads meeting in the middle in order to cover the bottom portion of the net. Owing to the style of play, groin injuries are common for butterfly goaltenders. Luongo suffered one during the 2008–09 season and missed 24 games.

As an athletic goaltender, Luongo was known for having quick reflexes, particularly with his glove. One of Luongo's early goaltending coaches, François Allaire, remembered Luongo to have had the "best catching glove [he'd] ever seen in a kid" when he first came to his goaltending school in Sainte-Thérèse-de-Gaspé, Québec, at the age of 14. Allaire is known to be a strong proponent of the butterfly style. At 6 feet and 3 inches, Luongo was able to cover a lot of net with his size. Observers also noted the strong concentration, competitiveness and mental aspects of his game. On the other hand, his puck-handling skills have been described as a weakness.

His style began to be directed during his midget years with Allaire and Montreal-Bourassa goaltending coach Mario Baril. Luongo sent tapes of his play to Allaire during his rookie season in the QMJHL and his former goaltending coach advised him to be more aggressive and come out of the net more to cut off angles and challenge shooters. the Canucks hired a new goaltending coach, Roland Melanson, prior to the 2010–11 season. Working with Melanson, Luongo began playing deeper in his crease against Allaire's original advice, allowing him to maintain positioning for rebounds.

Vancouver Canucks head coach Alain Vigneault said in March 2007 that Luongo played best with more playing time over the length of the season. Throughout his career, he garnered lots of playing time, including four consecutive 70-game seasons from 2003–04 to 2007–08 between the Florida Panthers and Canucks. He was known to suffer from slow starts to the season, usually in the first month of October. In his first three Octobers with the Canucks, Luongo posted a combined 10–13–0 record and a .899 save percentage – numbers that were well below his career pace. (Note: In October 2010, he allowed 20 goals over 7 games (2 wins and 4 losses). The following year, he opened the season with a 3.45 GAA and .868 save percentage over seven games.)

Luongo received the Mark Messier Leadership Award in his first season with the Canucks for the month of March 2007. Prior to the 2008–09 season, his third season with Vancouver, he was named Markus Näslund's successor as team captain and the first goaltender to be named a captain in 59 years. Teammate Mattias Öhlund, who served as alternate captain to Luongo for one season, described him as a vocal leader, while Luongo has also identified that quality in himself. General manager Mike Gillis described his commitment level as "unprecedented", adding that "he'd be a great example for our younger guys", at the time of the captaincy announcement. He served in that capacity for two seasons before relinquishing the captaincy prior to the 2010–11 season to forward Henrik Sedin.

== Post-playing career ==
The Panthers would then retire his number on March 7, 2020, with Luongo becoming the first player to earn this honor with the franchise.

Luongo served as Assistant GM for Canada's hockey team during the 2022 Winter Olympics.

Luongo joined the Panthers' front office in 2019, as a special advisor to general manager Bill Zito. He won his first Stanley Cup as an executive with the Panthers in 2024 as the Panthers defeated the Edmonton Oilers in seven games in the 2024 Stanley Cup Final.

The Panthers would repeat as Stanley Cup champions in 2025 against the Oilers, this time defeating them in six games.

== Personal life ==
While playing with the Florida Panthers, Luongo met his wife, Gina (née Cerbone), at a team hangout called the Pizza Time Trattoria. Gina is the daughter of the Italian restaurant owner, Umberto Cerbone, who is originally from Naples, while Gina's mother is from Palermo. Luongo proposed to Gina under the Bridge of Sighs in Venice in 2004. They lived in Broward County, Florida, during his tenure with the Panthers. However within a month of moving into a new home in Florida, Luongo was traded to Vancouver. They subsequently moved into the Vancouver neighbourhood of Yaletown, while spending Luongo's off-seasons in Fort Lauderdale, Florida. Luongo had been chosen as a starting goaltender for the 2008 NHL All-Star Game, but he chose not to attend in order to be with Gina, who was pregnant at the time and had returned to Florida. Their daughter was born on March 27, 2008. On December 27, 2010, Gina gave birth to the couple's son.

Luongo is involved with several charities. Like many Canucks players, he spent time with Canuck Place, a children's hospice in Vancouver. He also sponsored a spectator's box in Rogers Arena that was reserved for underprivileged children to attend Canucks games. At the end of games in which he was named one of the three stars, he was known to give away his goaltenders stick to a fan in the crowd. In the summer of 2009, he hosted the Roberto Luongo Golf Open to benefit Montreal Children's Hospital, Sainte-Justine Hospital, and a seniors centre network in Saint-Léonard. After the Stoneman Douglas High School shooting, Luongo, who lives in Parkland, gave a pre-game speech acknowledging the victims of the shooting and calling for action against mass shootings.

In addition to being an avid golfer, Luongo also enjoys playing poker.

In September 2011, Luongo was inducted into the Italian Walk of Fame in Toronto, Ontario. He was inducted into the Florida Sports Hall of Fame in 2021.

== Career statistics ==
=== Regular season and playoffs ===
			Regular season										Playoffs
Season	Team	League	GP	W	L	T	OTL	MIN	GA	SO	GAA	SV%	GP	W	L	MIN	GA	SO	GAA	SV%
1994–95	Montreal-Bourassa	QMAAA	25	10	14	0	—	1,465	94	0	3.85	—	—	—	—	—	—	—	—	—
1995–96	Val-d'Or Foreurs	QMJHL	23	6	11	4	—	1,201	74	0	3.70	.878	3	0	1	68	5	0	4.41	.865
1996–97	Val-d'Or Foreurs	QMJHL	60	32	21	2	—	3,302	171	2	3.10	.902	13	8	5	777	44	0	3.39	.904
1997–98	Val-d'Or Foreurs	QMJHL	54	33	19	0	—	3,043	157	7	3.09	.899	17	14	3	1,019	37	2	2.17	.933
1998–99	Val-d'Or Foreurs	QMJHL	21	6	10	2	—	1,476	77	1	3.93	.902	—	—	—	—	—	—	—	—
1998–99	Acadie–Bathurst Titan	QMJHL	22	14	7	1	—	1,342	74	0	3.31	.914	23	16	6	1,400	64	0	2.74	.915
1999–00	Lowell Lock Monsters	AHL	26	10	12	4	—	1,517	74	1	2.93	.908	6	3	3	359	18	0	3.00	.919
1999–00	New York Islanders	NHL	24	7	14	1	—	1,292	70	1	3.24	.908	—	—	—	—	—	—	—	—
2000–01	Louisville Panthers	AHL	3	1	2	0	—	178	10	0	3.38	.917	—	—	—	—	—	—	—	—
2000–01	Florida Panthers	NHL	47	12	24	7	—	2,628	107	5	2.44	.920	—	—	—	—	—	—	—	—
2001–02	Florida Panthers	NHL	58	16	33	4	—	3,030	140	4	2.77	.915	—	—	—	—	—	—	—	—
2002–03	Florida Panthers	NHL	65	20	34	7	—	3,627	164	6	2.71	.918	—	—	—	—	—	—	—	—
2003–04	Florida Panthers	NHL	73	25	33	14	—	4,252	172	7	2.43	.931	—	—	—	—	—	—	—	—
2005–06	Florida Panthers	NHL	75	35	30	—	9	4,305	213	4	2.97	.914	—	—	—	—	—	—	—	—
2006–07	Vancouver Canucks	NHL	76	47	22	—	6	4,490	171	5	2.29	.921	12	5	7	847	25	0	1.77	.941
2007–08	Vancouver Canucks	NHL	73	35	29	—	9	4,232	168	6	2.38	.917	—	—	—	—	—	—	—	—
2008–09	Vancouver Canucks	NHL	54	33	13	—	7	3,181	124	9	2.34	.920	10	6	4	618	26	1	2.52	.914
2009–10	Vancouver Canucks	NHL	68	40	22	—	4	3,899	167	4	2.57	.913	12	6	6	707	38	0	3.22	.895
2010–11	Vancouver Canucks	NHL	60	38	15	—	7	3,590	126	4	2.11	.928	25	15	10	1,427	61	4	2.56	.914
2011–12	Vancouver Canucks	NHL	55	31	14	—	8	3,162	127	5	2.41	.919	2	0	2	117	7	0	3.59	.891
2012–13	Vancouver Canucks	NHL	20	9	6	—	3	1,197	51	2	2.56	.907	3	0	2	140	6	0	2.57	.915
2013–14	Vancouver Canucks	NHL	42	19	16	—	6	2,418	96	3	2.38	.917	—	—	—	—	—	—	—	—
2013–14	Florida Panthers	NHL	14	6	7	—	1	804	33	1	2.46	.924	—	—	—	—	—	—	—	—
2014–15	Florida Panthers	NHL	61	28	19	—	12	3,528	138	2	2.35	.921	—	—	—	—	—	—	—	—
2015–16	Florida Panthers	NHL	62	35	19	—	6	3,602	141	4	2.35	.922	6	2	4	439	15	0	2.05	.934
2016–17	Florida Panthers	NHL	40	17	15	—	6	2,327	104	1	2.68	.915	—	—	—	—	—	—	—	—
2017–18	Florida Panthers	NHL	35	18	11	—	2	1,966	104	3	2.47	.929	—	—	—	—	—	—	—	—
2018–19	Florida Panthers	NHL	43	18	16	—	5	2,347	122	1	3.12	.899	—	—	—	—	—	—	—	—
NHL totals			1,044	489	392	33	91	59,879	2,515	77	2.52	.919	70	34	35	4,295	178	5	2.49	.918

=== International ===
Year	Team	Event	Result	GP	W	L	T	MIN	GA	SO	GAA	SV%
1998	Canada	WJC	8th	3	0	2	0	145	7	0	2.89	.901
1999	Canada	WJC	2nd place, silver medalist(s)	7	4	2	1	405	13	2	1.93	.942
2001	Canada	WC	5th	2	2	0	0	84	2	0	1.44	.949
2003	Canada	WC	1st place, gold medalist(s)	4	3	0	1	212	7	1	1.98	.930
2004	Canada	WC	1st place, gold medalist(s)	7	5	1	1	440	17	1	2.32	.919
2004	Canada	WCH	1st place, gold medalist(s)	1	1	0	0	64	3	0	2.82	.925
2005	Canada	WC	2nd place, silver medalist(s)	2	1	0	1	120	3	1	1.50	.930
2006	Canada	OLY	7th	2	1	1	0	119	3	0	1.51	.929
2010	Canada	OLY	1st place, gold medalist(s)	5	5	0	0	308	9	1	1.76	.927
2014	Canada	OLY	1st place, gold medalist(s)	1	1	0	0	60	0	1	0.00	1.000
Junior totals				10	4	4	1	550	20	2	2.18	.932
Senior totals				24	19	2	3	1,406	44	5	1.88	.929

== Awards and achievements ==
=== QMJHL ===
Award	Year(s)
Mike Bossy Trophy	1997
President's Cup champion	1998, 1999

=== NHL ===
Award	Year(s)
NHL YoungStars Game	2002
NHL Second All-Star Team	2004, 2007
Mark Messier Leadership Award	March 2007
NHL All-Star Game	2004, 2007, 2008, (Note: Named as starter but did not play.) 2009, 2015, 2016
Scotiabank Fan Fav Award	2009
William M. Jennings Trophy	2011
Stanley Cup champion (as executive)	2024, 2025

=== International ===
Award	Year(s)
World Junior Best Goaltender	1999
World Junior All-Star team	1999

=== Vancouver Canucks ===
Award	Year(s)
Most Exciting Player Award	2007
Cyclone Taylor Award	2007, 2008
Molson Cup	2007, 2008, 2009, 2011
Team Captain	2008–2010

== Records ==
=== Val-d'Or Foreurs ===
- Most wins in a season – 32 in 1996–97

=== QMJHL ===
- Most shutouts in a season – 7 in 1997–98 (tied with Nick Sanza, 1974–75; Adam Russo, 2002–03; Kevin Poulin, 2009–10)
- Most wins in single playoffs – 16 in 1999 (tied with Michel Morisette, 1982; Éric Fichaud, 1994; Eric Lafrance, 2003; Jonathan Bernier, 2007; Ryan Mior, 2008; Nicola Riopel, 2010)
- Most games played all-time, playoffs – 56 from 1995–99 surpassed Marc Denis, 43 games played, 1994–97)
- Most minutes played all-time, playoffs – 3,264:22 from 1995 to 1999 (surpassed Marc Denis, 2,518:07, 1994–97)
- Most wins all-time, playoffs – 38 from 1995 to 1999 (surpassed Robert Desjardins, 30, 1984–87)
- Most shots faced all-time, playoffs – 1,808 from 1995 to 1999 (surpassed Manny Fernandez, 1,351, 1991–94)

=== NHL ===
- Most saves in a single season – 2,303 in 2003–04 (surpassed Félix Potvin, 2,214 in 1996–97)
- Most shots faced in a single season – 2,488 in 2005–06 (surpassed himself, 2,475 in 2003–04)
- Most shots faced in a single playoff game – 76 on April 11, 2007
- Most home games played in a single season – 41 in 2006–07
- Most regular season overtime wins, all-time – 49 (as of 2008–09)

=== Florida Panthers ===
- Longest shutout streak – 144:51 minutes in 2002–03
- Most shutouts in a season – 7 in 2003–04 (surpassed himself, six shutouts in 2002–03; tied with Tomáš Vokoun, 2009–10)
- Most wins in a season – 35 in 2005–06 (surpassed John Vanbiesbrouck, 27 wins in 1996–97)
- Most games played in a season – 75 in 2005–06 (surpassed himself, 72 games played in 2003–04)
- Most games played all-time – 318
- Most wins all-time – 108 (surpassed John Vanbiesbrouck, 106 wins)
- Most shutouts all-time – 26 (surpassed John Vanbiesbrouck, 13 shutouts)

=== Vancouver Canucks ===
- Most saves in a single game – 72 on April 11, 2007
- Longest shutout streak – 242:36 minutes in 2008–09 (surpassed himself, 184:20 minutes in 2007–08)
- Most wins in a season – 47 in 2006–07 (surpassed Kirk McLean, 38 in 1991–92)
- Most games played in a season – 75 in 2006–07 (surpassed Gary Smith, 72 in 1974–75)
- Most shutouts in a season – 9 in 2008–09 (surpassed Dan Cloutier – 7 in 2001–02)
- Lowest GAA in a season – 2.11 in 2010–11 (surpassed Dan Cloutier – 2.27 in 2003–04)
- Most shutouts all-time – 33 (surpassed Kirk McLean, 20)
- Most wins all-time – 224 (after end of 2011–2012 season; surpassed Kirk McLean, 211)

== Notes ==
Awards and achievements
Preceded by Jean-Pierre Dumont	Mike Bossy Trophy; 1997	Succeeded by Vincent Lecavalier
Preceded by Jean-Pierre Dumont	New York Islanders first-round draft pick 1997	Succeeded by Eric Brewer
Preceded by David Aebischer	World Junior Best Goaltender; 1999	Succeeded by Rick DiPietro
Preceded by Award created	Scotiabank Fan Fav Award; 2009	Succeeded by Award discontinued
Preceded by Martin Brodeur	Winner of the William M. Jennings Trophy; 2011; With: Cory Schneider	Succeeded by Brian Elliott, Jaroslav Halák
Sporting positions
Preceded by Markus Näslund	Vancouver Canucks captain 2008–2010	Succeeded by Henrik Sedin
