= Evgeni Nabokov =

Kazakhstani-Russian ice hockey player (born 1975)

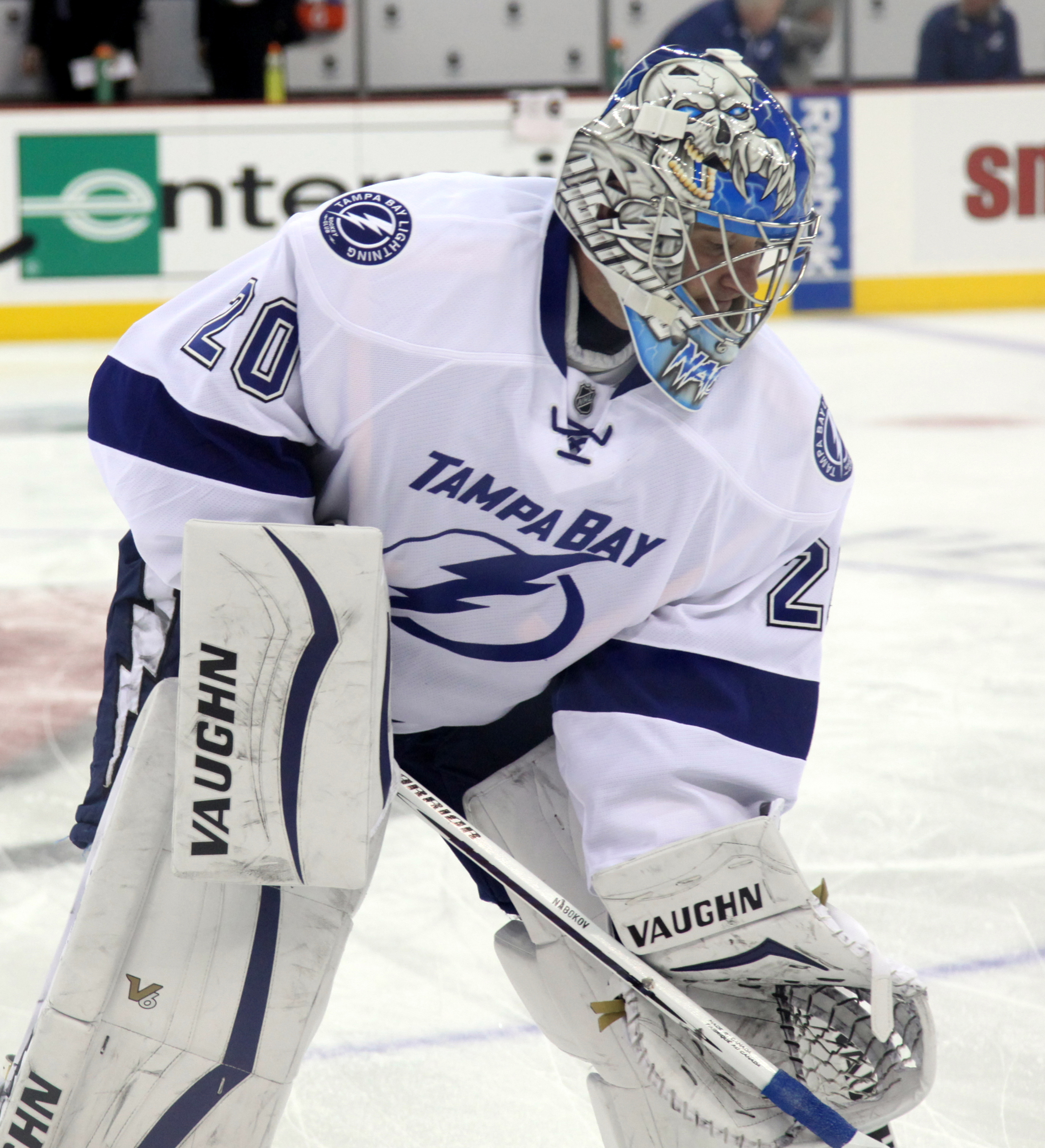
- Nabokov with the Tampa Bay Lightning in 2014
- Born: July 25, 1975 (age 51) Ust-Kamenogorsk, Kazakh SSR, Soviet Union
- Height: 6 ft 0 in (183 cm)
- Weight: 202 lb (92 kg; 14 st 6 lb)
- Position: Goaltender
- Caught: Left
- Played for: Torpedo Ust-Kamenogorsk; Dynamo Moscow; San Jose Sharks; Metallurg Magnitogorsk; SKA Saint Petersburg; New York Islanders; Tampa Bay Lightning
- National team: Kazakhstan and Russia
- NHL draft: 219th overall, 1994; San Jose Sharks
- Playing career: 1991–2015

Yevgeni Viktorovich Nabokov (Russian: Евгений Викторович Набоков; born July 25, 1975) is a Kazakh-born Russian former professional ice hockey goaltender who played for the San Jose Sharks, New York Islanders, and Tampa Bay Lightning of National Hockey League (NHL) and for Torpedo Ust-Kamenogorsk, Dynamo Moscow, Metallurg Magnitogorsk and SKA Saint Petersburg of the Russian Super League (RSL) and Kontinental Hockey League (KHL) from 1991 to 2015.

Nicknamed "Nabby", Nabokov, who was selected 219th overall in the 1994 NHL entry draft by San Jose, was regarded as one of the top goaltenders in the NHL, winning the Calder Memorial Trophy as the best first-year player in 2001 and was voted a finalist for the Vezina Trophy as best goaltender in 2008. He departed the NHL for the first time in 2010 to play for SKA Saint Petersburg in Russia, but returned soon after, and concluded his career in the NHL. After retiring as a player Nabokov took up a role as a development coach for the Sharks, and in 2019 was named the goaltending coach for team.

In his first nine seasons in the NHL, all with San Jose, Nabokov became the team leader in nearly every goaltending category, including games played, wins, and shutouts. At his retirement, he had the eighteenth most all-time NHL regular season wins. During a game in 2002 he scored a goal, the seventh goalie in NHL history to do so, and the first not from North America.

Born in the then-Soviet republic of Kazakhstan, Nabokov first played internationally with Kazakhstan at the 1994 World Championships Group C. However, he later joined the Russian national team, and played for them from 2006, including both the 2006 and 2010 Winter Olympics, winning a gold at the 2008 World Championships.

== Playing career ==
=== Russia and move to North America ===
Nabokov first played for his hometown team, Torpedo Ust-Kamenogorsk, spending three years with the club from 1991 until 1994. After his last season with the club he was selected in the 1994 NHL entry draft by the San Jose Sharks in the ninth round, 219th overall. Tim Burke, the Sharks' scout, was originally scouting for a different goalie when he heard of Nabokov. The Sharks never saw Nabokov play before selecting him in the draft, and did not contact him until 1997. The following season Nabokov moved to join Dynamo Moscow, where he spent the next three seasons. In his first year with Dynamo, they won the league championship. It was after the 1996–97 season, which saw Nabokov help Dynamo reach the final of the European Hockey League, that he was contacted by the Sharks and offered a contract and come to North America.

Happy to play for Dynamo Moscow, Nabokov was initially reluctant to move to North America and play for the Sharks minor league affiliates, but decided to on the advice of his parents. Assigned to the Kentucky Thoroughblades, the Sharks' affiliate in the American Hockey League (AHL), he struggled to adapt to the new surroundings and style of hockey, and was ready to return to Russia during his first year. However he decided to stay after meeting his future wife, Tabitha, and refining his playing style with the Sharks goaltending coach, Warren Strelow. Used as the Thoroughblades back-up goalie, Nabokov only played in 33 games for the team. The following season was much better as he stayed near the AHL leaders in nearly every goaltending category, though he missed time due to appendicitis; he appeared in 43 games for Kentucky, winning 26 of them.

=== San Jose Sharks ===
Nabokov started the 1999–2000 season with the Sharks affiliate, the Cleveland Lumberjacks of the International Hockey League (IHL). After 20 games with Cleveland, where he had a record of twelve wins, four losses, and three ties, Nabokov was recalled to the Sharks to serve as the back-up to Steve Shields, after Mike Vernon was traded. Nabokov made his NHL debut on January 1, 2000, in relief of Shields, against the Nashville Predators. His first start came January 19 against the Colorado Avalanche; Nabokov made 39 saves for his first shutout in a 0–0 tie. He finished with 11 games played for the Sharks during the 1999–00 NHL season, winning two and losing two.

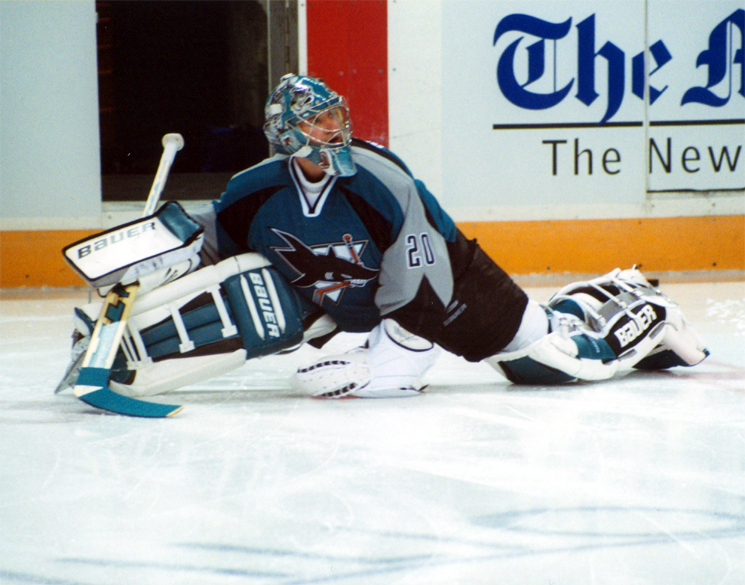
Nabokov stretching with the San Jose Sharks before a game in November 2005

In the second game of the 2000–01 season, Shields hurt his ankle, leaving Nabokov to become the starting goalie. He appeared in 66 games and had a record of 32 wins and 21 losses, and was named to the mid-season All-Star Game. In recognition of his play, Nabokov was named the winner of the Calder Memorial Trophy as the rookie of the year, and was named to the year-end All-Rookie team; he also finished fourth in voting for the Vezina Trophy for best goalie in the league. He had similar success the following season, with 37 wins and 7 shutouts in 67 games, and on March 10, 2002, he scored a goal against the Vancouver Canucks, both the first European goalie to do so, and the first goalie to score a powerplay goal.

At the start of the 2002–03 season, Nabokov held out in a contract dispute. After making less than $1 million the previous two seasons, he felt he deserved an increase in salary, speculated to be around $4 million per season. He missed five games before the team signed him to a two-year contract worth slightly more than $3.5 million per season. Both Nabokov and the Sharks had a poor season, with the team missing the playoffs for the first time in six years, and Nabokov only winning 19 games, and finishing with a losing record. This was improved upon in 2003–04 though, as Nabokov's 31 wins helped the team reach the playoffs again, where they reached the third round for the first time in team history. A further two-year extension signed in 2004 saw him earn almost $4.5 million per year.

Nabokov was considered one of the elite goaltenders in the NHL, and was often ranked as one of the top ten, if not top five goaltenders in the NHL by ESPN The Magazine and The Hockey News. However, the 2005–06 season was an off year for Nabokov, and his save percentage of under .900 was a big concern to the team. He was relegated to the role of backup goaltender behind Vesa Toskala. Despite his less-than-stellar play, Nabokov was signed to a four-year contract extension worth roughly $21.5 million in February 2006. The contract had a no-trade clause that was activated on the condition that San Jose made the playoffs.

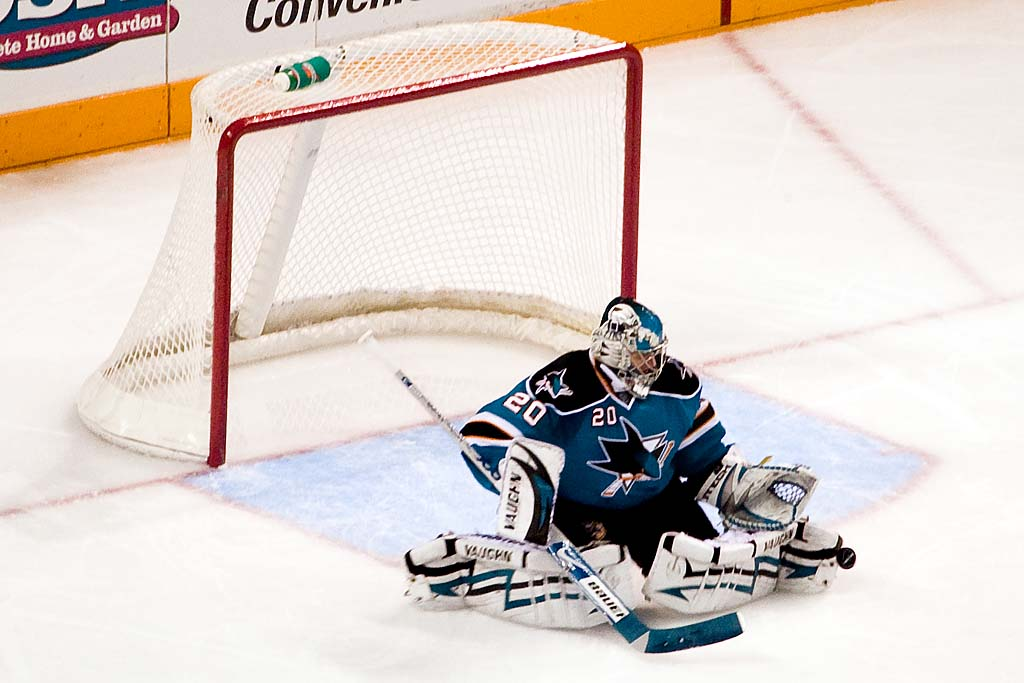
Nabokov in net for the San Jose Sharks in November 2007

During the 2006–07 NHL season, Nabokov split the starting goaltending duties with Toskala. In the Sharks 82 games Nabokov started 49. Nabokov played all 5 games in the Western Conference Quarterfinals of the 2007 NHL playoffs, helping the Sharks defeat the Nashville Predators in 5 games.

During the first half of the 2007–08 NHL season, Nabokov started the first 43 games for the Sharks, however on January 13, 2008, in Anaheim he received his first day off when Thomas Greiss started his first NHL game. Nabokov was recognized as one of the "Three Stars" for the NHL in the last week of December 2007, along with Alexander Ovechkin of the Washington Capitals and Jaromír Jágr of the New York Rangers. In addition to that honor, Nabokov was named the "Sharks Player of the Month" by Seagate Technology in December. Since the 1996–97 season, Seagate Technology has recognized Sharks players who made contributions to further the team's accomplishments and makes a donation of $2,500 to The Sharks Foundation on the players’ behalf. Nabokov holds the franchise-record for having won this award nine times.

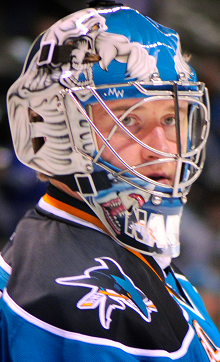
Nabokov with the Sharks in 2008

Nabokov played in his second NHL All-Star Game on January 27, 2008. He stopped all eight shots that came at him, marking the first time since Nikolai Khabibulin's period in the 2002 game that a goalie played an All-Star period where no goals were scored. He secured the scoreless period when he blocked both of Ilya Kovalchuk’s shots in the last minute of the second period. On May 4, during game six of the 2008 NHL Playoffs Western Conference Semi-Finals, Nabokov made what has been called one of the best glove saves in decades, when he saved a shot from Brad Richards of the Dallas Stars by sliding over from the other side of the post and gloving the puck. The save was reviewed for several minutes before making it clear Nabokov saved it before it went over the goal line. The game, which ended in a Dallas victory, lasted for four overtime periods and is the eighth longest game in the league's history.

Nabokov recorded 41 wins for San Jose during the following season as the team clinched first overall in the Western Conference and the league. Despite this, San Jose was eliminated in the first round of the playoffs by eighth seed Anaheim Ducks, marking just the fourth time that an eighth seed team defeated a first seed team in the first round of the playoffs. On October 17, 2009, he played in his 500th career game, all played with the Sharks, and stopped 31 shots in a 4–1 win over the New York Islanders. On February 11, 2010, Nabokov stopped a career-high 50 shots en route to a 3–2 shootout victory against the Detroit Red Wings, which was also his 11th consecutive road victory, a new NHL record.

=== Later career ===
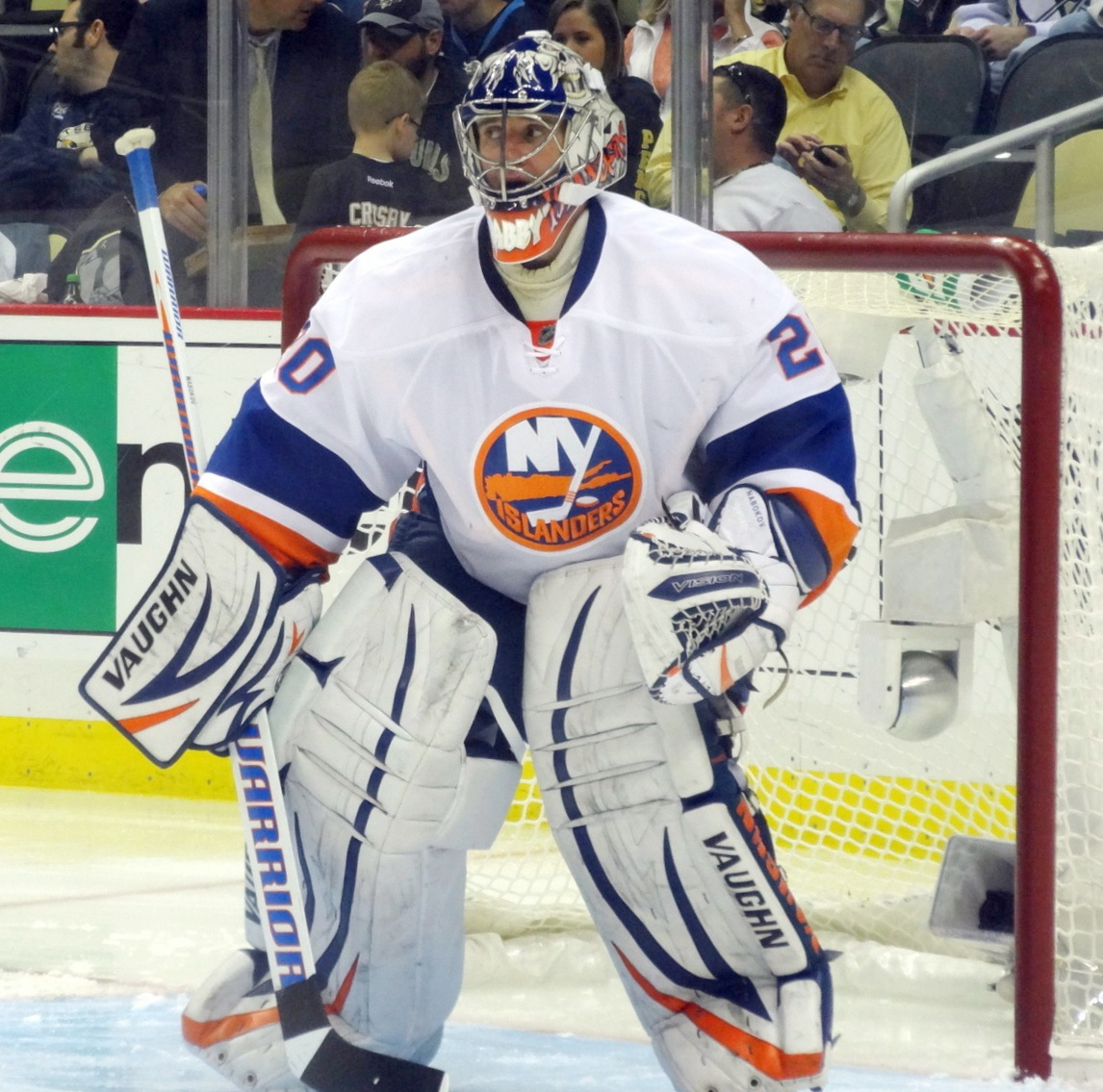
Nabokov with the Islanders in 2013

At the conclusion of the 2009–10 season Nabokov was told by the Sharks general manager Doug Wilson that he would not be offered a new contract, with the team unable to meet his salary demands due to the NHL salary cap. An unrestricted free agent, Nabokov did not see any offers from NHL teams, and so signed a contract with SKA St. Petersburg of the Kontinental Hockey League (KHL). The deal was reported to be for $24 million over four years. The salary was in line with demands Nabokov had apparently been seeking, though he denied money was a factor, but rather signed because of the length of the contract. Nabokov struggled in the KHL, and after 22 games with SKA he was released by the team in December, which cited "family circumstances" in a statement. During his lone season in the KHL, Nabokov recorded eight wins and eight losses, with a goals against average far above and save percentage far below his career averages.

Once again a free agent, Nabokov signed a contract with the Detroit Red Wings on January 20, 2011; the Red Wings were one of the top teams in the NHL at the time, and Nabokov signed a contract for just $570,000 as a result. However, as he had started the season in the KHL, NHL rules required him to be placed on waivers prior to joining the Red Wings, and thus be available at that salary to any team lower than them in the standings. He was subsequently claimed by the New York Islanders, who were one of the worst teams in the NHL at the time. As he had only signed with Detroit in hopes of playing in the playoffs that year, Nabokov refused to join the Islanders, stating that it didn't make a lot of sense to him why they claimed him. The Islanders suspended Nabokov for failing to join the team, and he sat out the rest of the season.

In August 2011, Nabokov stated that he would be reporting to New York's training camp. He played for the team the entirety of the 2011–12 season, wearing the number 20, and eventually took over the starting goaltender position. He got his first win with the team on October 15, 2011, against the New York Rangers. On January 14, 2012, Nabokov recorded his 300th career win against the Buffalo Sabres, becoming the 26th goaltender to reach the milestone. On March 21, 2012, he signed a one-year, $2.75 million contract extension to remain with New York for another season, followed by another one-year $3.25 million contract for the 2013–14 season.

After New York signed goaltenders Jaroslav Halak and Chad Johnson in the 2014 off-season, it became clear they didn't have plans to re-sign Nabokov. On July 1, 2014, he signed a one-year contract with the Tampa Bay Lightning worth $1.55 million. After posting a 3–6–2 record as the team's backup goaltender to Ben Bishop, he was placed on waivers around the midpoint of the season, February 1, 2015. Following his waivers clear, it was questioned as to whether he would report to Tampa Bay's AHL affiliate or consider retirement. On February 9, 2015, Nabokov was traded back to the Sharks for "future considerations". He announced his retirement on February 11, 2015.

== Post-playing career ==
In September 2015, Nabokov became a goaltending development coach and scout in the Sharks organization; in addition to the Sharks, he worked with the goaltenders on the team's AHL affiliate San Jose Barracuda. On December 11, 2019, after head coach Peter DeBoer and his assistants were fired, Nabokov was named the Sharks' goaltending coach under interim coach Bob Boughner.

== International career ==
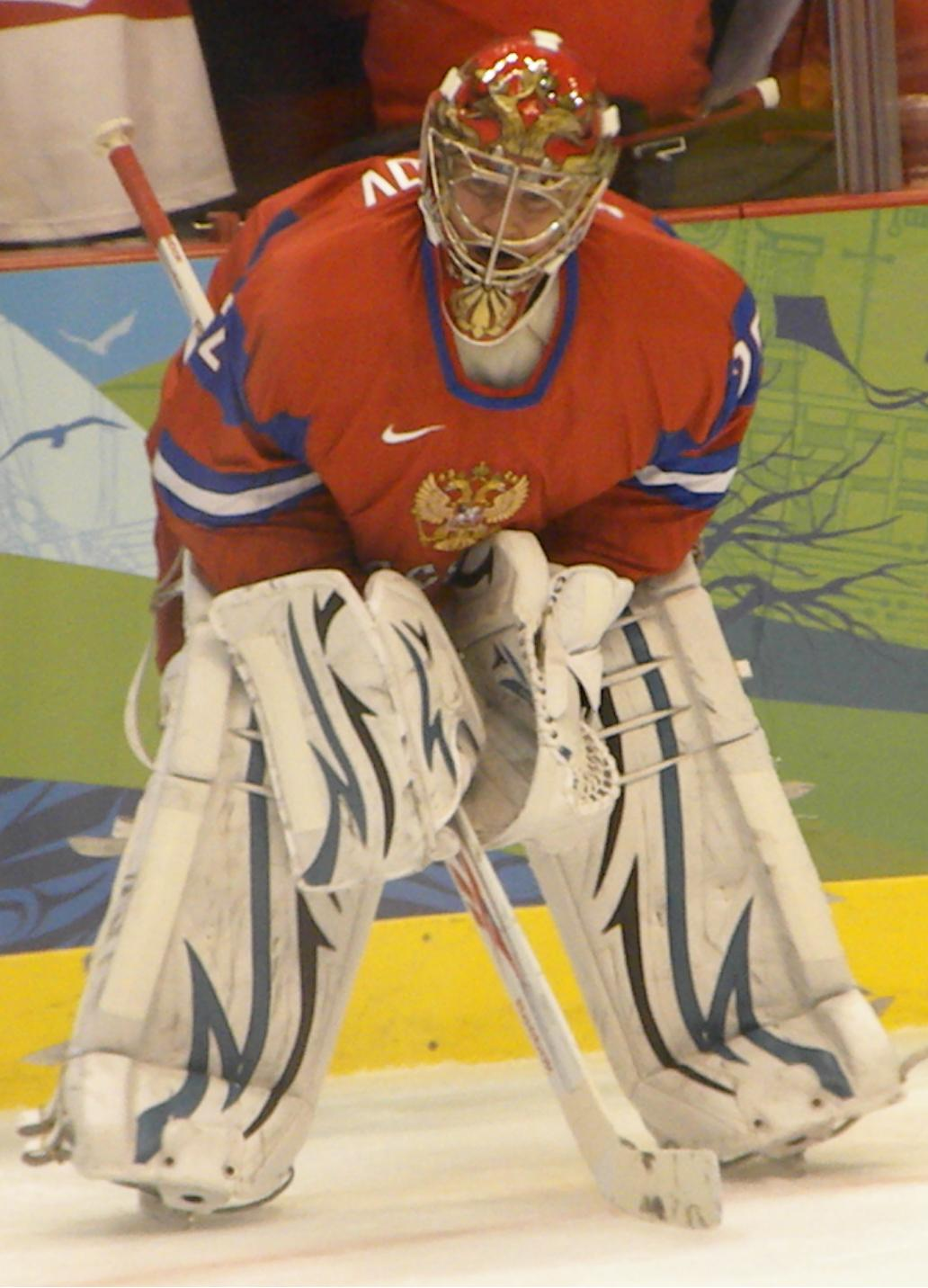
- Nabokov at the 2010 Winter Olympics

Medal record

Representing Russia

Men's ice hockey

World Championships
Gold medal – first place	2008 Russia	Ice hockey

Nabokov first played an international tournament with Kazakhstan at the 1994 World Championships C Pool. He appeared in three games as Kazakhstan finished fourth in the tournament. This appearance prevented Nabokov from playing for Russia at the 2002 Winter Olympics. Though Nabokov appealed to play, International Ice Hockey Federation (IIHF) bylaws stated that players cannot represent two different countries after the age of 18; as Nabokov was 19 during his appearance with Kazakhstan, he was unable to play for Russia.

The IIHF granted Nabokov an exemption to play for Russia at the 2006 Winter Olympics. Nabokov played seven games during the Olympics, winning four and earning three shutouts as the Russians finished fourth. He next represented Russia at the 2008 World Championships. Nabokov posted back-to-back shut-outs before defeating Canada 5–4 in the gold medal game. He was named to the tournament's all-star team and named best goaltender.

Nabokov next joined Russia for the 2008 IIHF World Championship, arriving after the Sharks were eliminated in the NHL playoffs. He appeared in five games, winning them all, and helped Russia win their first gold medal since 1993, and was named as the tournament's best goaltender and put on the tournament all-star team. The starting goalie for Russia at the 2010 Winter Olympics, Nabokov helped Russia reach the quarterfinals against Canada. However he allowed four goals in the first period and was subsequently pulled, with Russia ultimately losing 7–3. Nabokov finished the Olympics with a record of two wins and one loss as the Russians placed sixth overall. His final appearance in an international tournament was at the 2011 IIHF World Championship. Nabokov played four games for Russia, winning two and losing one, before a groin injury forced him to leave the tournament; Russia finished fourth.

== Personal life ==
Nabokov, an only child, was born in Ust-Kamenogorsk (or Oskemen) in the Kazakh language, in the Kazakh SSR (now Kazakhstan). His father, Viktor, was a former professional hockey goaltender who played for 18 years in the Soviet Union before he retired in 1987. After his playing career ended, Viktor established a goaltending school in the city, which Nabokov later attended. His mother, Tatyana, worked as an engineer in a local factory. Nabokov first played hockey when he was six years old, taking up the same position his father had played.

When he moved to North America in 1997, Nabokov initially went by the name "John", fearing that English speakers might have difficulty pronouncing his name.

Nabokov met his wife, Tabitha Eckler, shortly after he began playing in Kentucky. She was a college student and waitress at the time. They were married in 2001. They have two children together, daughter Emily (born in January 2004), and son Andrei (born on February 12, 2007).

== Career statistics ==
=== Regular season and playoffs ===
			Regular season										Playoffs
Season	Team	League	GP	W	L	T	OTL	MIN	GA	SO	GAA	SV%	GP	W	L	MIN	GA	SO	GAA	SV%
1991–92	Torpedo Ust–Kamenogorsk	CIS	1	—	—	—	—	20	1	0	3.00	—	—	—	—	—	—	—	—	—
1991–92	Torpedo–2 Ust–Kamenogorsk	CIS.3	5	—	—	—	—	—	—	—	—	—	—	—	—	—	—	—	—	—
1992–93	Torpedo Ust–Kamenogorsk	RUS	4	—	—	—	—	109	5	0	2.75	—	—	—	—	—	—	—	—	—
1992–93	Torpedo–2 Ust–Kamenogorsk	RUS.2	19	—	—	—	—	—	—	—	—	—	—	—	—	—	—	—	—	—
1993–94	Torpedo Ust–Kamenogorsk	RUS	11	—	—	—	—	539	29	0	3.23	—	—	—	—	—	—	—	—	—
1994–95	Dynamo Moscow	RUS	24	—	—	—	—	1265	40	3	1.90	—	13	—	—	810	30	—	2.22	—
1994–95	Dynamo–2 Moscow	RUS.2	2	—	—	—	—	—	—	—	—	—	—	—	—	—	—	—	—	—
1995–96	Dynamo Moscow	RUS	39	—	—	—	—	2008	67	5	2.00	—	6	—	—	298	7	—	1.41	—
1995–96	Dynamo–2 Moscow	RUS.2	1	—	—	—	—	—	—	—	—	—	—	—	—	—	—	—	—	—
1996–97	Dynamo Moscow	RSL	27	—	—	—	—	1588	56	2	2.12	—	4	—	—	255	12	0	2.82	—
1996–97	Dynamo–2 Moscow	RUS.3	1	—	—	—	—	—	2	—	—	—	—	—	—	—	—	—	—	—
1997–98	Kentucky Thoroughblades	AHL	33	10	21	2	—	1866	122	0	3.92	.872	1	0	0	23	1	2.59	0	.923
1998–99	Kentucky Thoroughblades	AHL	43	26	14	1	—	2429	106	5	2.62	.909	11	6	5	599	30	2	3.00	.907
1999–2000	San Jose Sharks	NHL	11	2	2	1	—	415	15	1	2.17	.910	1	0	0	20	0	0	0.00	1.000
1999–2000	Cleveland Lumberjacks	IHL	20	12	4	3	—	1164	52	0	2.68	.920	—	—	—	—	—	—	—	—
1999–2000	Kentucky Thoroughblades	AHL	2	1	1	0	—	120	3	1	1.50	.952	—	—	—	—	—	—	—	—
2000–01	San Jose Sharks	NHL	66	32	21	7	—	3700	135	6	2.19	.915	4	1	3	218	10	1	2.75	.903
2001–02	San Jose Sharks	NHL	67	37	24	5	—	3901	149	7	2.29	.918	12	7	5	712	31	0	2.61	.904
2002–03	San Jose Sharks	NHL	55	19	28	8	—	3227	1415	3	2.71	.906	—	—	—	—	—	—	—	—
2003–04	San Jose Sharks	NHL	59	31	19	8	—	3456	127	9	2.20	.921	17	10	7	1053	30	3	1.71	.935
2004–05	Metallurg Magnitogorsk	RSL	14	—	—	—	—	808	27	3	2.00	.927	5	—	—	307	13	0	2.53	.915
2005–06	San Jose Sharks	NHL	45	16	19	—	7	2575	133	1	3.10	.885	1	0	0	12	4	0	5.00	.750
2006–07	San Jose Sharks	NHL	50	25	16	—	4	2778	106	7	2.29	.914	11	6	5	701	26	1	2.23	.920
2007–08	San Jose Sharks	NHL	77	46	21	—	8	4561	163	6	2.14	.910	13	6	7	853	31	1	2.18	.907
2008–09	San Jose Sharks	NHL	62	41	12	—	8	3687	150	7	2.44	.910	6	2	4	362	17	0	2.82	.890
2009–10	San Jose Sharks	NHL	71	44	16	—	10	4195	170	3	2.43	.922	15	8	7	890	38	1	2.56	.907
2010–11	SKA St. Petersburg	KHL	22	8	8	—	5	1230	62	2	3.02	.888	—	—	—	—	—	—	—	—
2011–12	New York Islanders	NHL	42	19	18	—	3	2378	101	2	2.55	.914	—	—	—	—	—	—	—	—
2012–13	New York Islanders	NHL	41	23	11	—	7	2476	103	3	2.50	.910	6	2	4	325	24	0	4.44	.842
2013–14	New York Islanders	NHL	40	15	14	—	8	2255	103	4	2.74	.905	—	—	—	—	—	—	—	—
2014–15	Tampa Bay Lightning	NHL	11	3	6	—	2	554	29	0	3.15	.882	—	—	—	—	—	—	—	—
CIS/RUS/RSL/KHL totals			142	—	—	—	—	7,567	287	16	2.28	—	28	—	—	1,670	62	—	2.23	—
NHL totals			697	353	227	29	57	40,152	1,630	59	2.44	.911	86	42	42	5,144	208	7	2.43	.908

=== International ===
Year	Team	Event	GP	W	L	T	MIN	GA	SO	GAA	SV%
1994	Kazakhstan	WC C	3	—	—	—	140	6	—	2.57	.857
2006	Russia	OG	7	4	2	0	359	8	3	1.34	.940
2008	Russia	WC	5	5	0	—	303	9	2	1.78	.929
2010	Russia	OG	3	2	1	—	144	10	0	4.16	.853
2011	Russia	WC	4	2	1	—	200	12	0	3.60	.880
Senior totals			19	13	4	0	1006	39	5	2.33	.909

== Awards ==
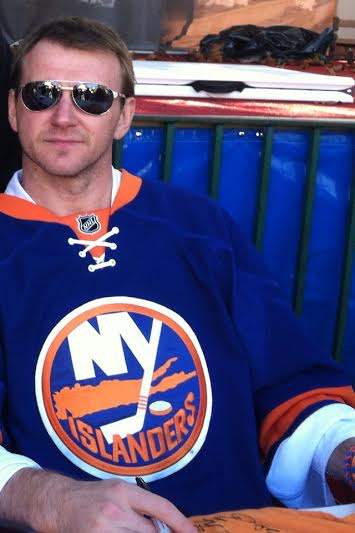
Nabokov signing autographs in October 2013

=== NHL ===
Award	Year(s)
Calder Memorial Trophy	2001
NHL All-Rookie team	2001
NHL All-Star Game	2001, 2008
NHL first All-Star team	2008

=== San Jose Sharks ===
Award	Year(s)
Sharks Player of the Year	2001, 2008
Sharks Rookie of the Year	2001
Three Stars of the Game Award	2010

Awards and achievements
Preceded by Scott Gomez	Winner of the Calder Trophy; 2001	Succeeded by Dany Heatley
