= Warren Strelow =

American ice hockey coach (1934–2007)

Warren A. Strelow
- Born: January 24, 1934; Saint Paul, Minnesota, U.S.
- Died: April 11, 2007 (aged 73); Worcester, Massachusetts, U.S.
- Occupations: Ice hockey coach, player

Medal record

Men's ice hockey

Representing the USA
| Gold medal – first place | 1980 United States | (Goalie Coach) |

Warren A. Strelow (January 22, 1934 – April 11, 2007) was a hockey goaltending coach. Arguably best known as the goaltenders coach for the United States Olympic Ice Hockey Team during the 1980 games in Lake Placid, he also served in the same capacity as coach for the New Jersey Devils, Washington Capitals, and San Jose Sharks of the NHL.

NHL goaltenders whom Strelow worked with include: Martin Brodeur, Miikka Kiprusoff, Evgeni Nabokov, Vesa Toskala, Johan Hedberg, and Nolan Schaefer.

== Personal ==
Strelow was born and raised in St. Paul, Minnesota where he grew up playing hockey with his lifelong friend, Herb Brooks, for whom he would later serve under as goaltenders coach both at the University of Minnesota and with the 1980 (Gold Medal) and 2002 (Silver Medal) Olympic teams. Strelow graduated from Johnson High School in 1951, the year he was named to the Minnesota all-state team as a goaltender, having played for the team that lost the state final to Eveleth. He and his wife Karlene had two children, Tom and Rick.
