= François Allaire =

Canadian ice hockey player (born 1955)

Francois Allaire
- Born: October 11, 1955 (age 69); Mirabel, Quebec, Canada
- Coached for: Montreal Canadiens; Mighty Ducks of Anaheim; Toronto Maple Leafs; Colorado Avalanche

François Allaire (born October 11, 1955) is a Canadian former professional ice hockey goaltending coach who most recently coached for the Colorado Avalanche of the National Hockey League (NHL). He developed considerable expertise during the 1980s as the Montreal Canadiens' first goaltending coach. In the 1990s, he promoted his methods to the younger generation of goalies, making his technique a new standard. The "Allaire style" stresses sound positioning, getting down into the butterfly, and taking up as much net as possible. He encouraged his goalies to wear the biggest allowable gear. He now serves as a goaltending consultant with the Florida Panthers.

== National Hockey League career ==
Allaire successfully mentored Patrick Roy, winning Stanley Cups in 1986 and 1993. In 2003, he guided the relatively unheralded Jean-Sébastien Giguère to the Conn Smythe Trophy as the most valuable player in the Stanley Cup Playoffs. He won a third Stanley Cup championship with the Anaheim Ducks in 2007.

On 10 June 2009, Allaire left the Ducks to join the Toronto Maple Leafs, resuming a working relationship with Brian Burke, Toronto's former general manager, who had served as Anaheim's GM since 2005 before joining the Maple Leafs in November 2008. Allaire was later reunited with Giguère when Giguère was traded for Vesa Toskala and Jason Blake on January 31, 2010. Allaire mentored both Jonas Gustavsson and starting goalie James Reimer until leaving the Maple Leafs in September 2012. Allaire again reunited with Giguère after being hired as the goaltending coach in Colorado.

His brother Benoit Allaire, also a goaltending coach, has worked for the Phoenix Coyotes and is currently with the New York Rangers.

Allaire retired from coaching in 2017.

Team	Years
MON	1984-1996
ANA	1996-2009
TOR	2009-2012
COL	2013-2017
