= 1995–96 Edmonton Oilers season =

NHL team season

1995–96 Edmonton Oilers
- Division: 5th Pacific
- Conference: 10th Western
- 1995–96 record: 30–44–8
- Home record: 15–21–5
- Road record: 15–23–3
- Goals for: 240
- Goals against: 304

Team information
- General manager: Glen Sather
- Coach: Ron Low
- Captain: Kelly Buchberger
- Alternate captains: Jason Arnott; Luke Richardson; Doug Weight
- Arena: Edmonton Coliseum
- Average attendance: 12,334 (75.0%)
- Minor league affiliates: Cape Breton Oilers (AHL); Wheeling Thunderbirds (ECHL)

Team leaders
- Goals: Zdeno Ciger (31)
- Assists: Doug Weight (79)
- Points: Doug Weight (104)
- Penalty minutes: Bryan Marchment (202)
- Plus/minus: Mariusz Czerkawski (+7)
- Wins: Curtis Joseph (15)
- Goals against average: Curtis Joseph (3.44)

The 1995–96 Edmonton Oilers season was the Oilers' 17th season in the NHL, and they were coming off a 17–27–4 record, earning 38 points, in the lockout shortened 1994–95 season, missing the playoffs for the 3rd straight season.

During the off-season, the Oilers and St. Louis Blues would complete a trade that saw Edmonton acquire goaltender Curtis Joseph and the rights of Mike Grier in exchange for a 1st round draft pick in both 1996 and 1997. Joseph and the Oilers could not come to a contract agreement, and he would start the season with the Las Vegas Thunder of the IHL. The Oilers also would bring back Glenn Anderson, whom they traded in 1991, as he signed as a free agent, however, he would be dealt to the Blues midway through the season.

As the Oilers would struggle badly early in the season, sitting with a 14–23–6 record at the time of the signing, the team and Joseph agreed to a contract in early January, and Edmonton would then trade their other #1 goaltender, Bill Ranford, to the Boston Bruins for Sean Brown, Mariusz Czerkawski and the Bruins 1st round pick in 1996. Edmonton would play better defensive hockey after the trade, as Joseph would post a 15–16–2 record, however, it was not enough for the Oilers to make the playoffs as the team missed the playoffs for the fourth year in a row for the first time in franchise history, as they finished 10 points behind the 8th place Winnipeg Jets.

Offensively, Doug Weight became the first Oiler since Mark Messier in 1989–90 to reach the 100-point plateau, as Weight would record 104 points. Zdeno Ciger scored a team-high 31 goals, while Jason Arnott scored 28 goals and 59 points despite missing 18 games due to injuries. Boris Mironov led the defense with 32 points, while fellow blueliner Jeff Norton would earn 20 points in 30 games after being acquired from St. Louis.

In goal, Bill Ranford would get most of the action until early January, winning 13 games and posting a 3.84 GAA, then Curtis Joseph stepped in and led the Oilers in wins at 15, and posted a team best 3.44 GAA.

== Regular season ==
=== Season standings ===
Pacific Division
No.		GP	W	L	T	GF	GA	Pts
1	**Colorado Avalanche**	82	47	25	10	326	240	104
2	**Calgary Flames**	82	34	37	11	241	240	79
3	**Vancouver Canucks**	82	32	35	15	278	278	79
4	Mighty Ducks of Anaheim	82	35	39	8	234	247	78
5	Edmonton Oilers	82	30	44	8	240	304	68
6	Los Angeles Kings	82	24	40	18	256	302	66
7	San Jose Sharks	82	20	55	7	252	357	47

Note: GP = Games played; W = Wins; L = Losses; T = Ties; GF = Goals for; GA = Goals against; Pts = Points
Bolded teams qualified for the playoffs.

Western Conference
R		Div	GP	W	L	T	GF	GA	Pts
**1**	**p – Detroit Red Wings**	**CEN**	**82**	**62**	**13**	**7**	**325**	**181**	**131**
**2**	**Colorado Avalanche**	**PAC**	**82**	**47**	**25**	**10**	**326**	**240**	**104**
**3**	**Chicago Blackhawks**	**CEN**	**82**	**40**	**28**	**14**	**273**	**220**	**94**
**4**	**Toronto Maple Leafs**	**CEN**	**82**	**34**	**36**	**12**	**247**	**252**	**80**
**5**	**St. Louis Blues**	**CEN**	**82**	**32**	**34**	**16**	**219**	**248**	**80**
**6**	**Calgary Flames**	**PAC**	**82**	**34**	**37**	**11**	**241**	**240**	**79**
**7**	**Vancouver Canucks**	**PAC**	**82**	**32**	**35**	**15**	**278**	**278**	**79**
**8**	**Winnipeg Jets**	**CEN**	**82**	**36**	**40**	**6**	**275**	**291**	**78**
9	Mighty Ducks of Anaheim	PAC	82	35	39	8	234	247	78
10	Edmonton Oilers	PAC	82	30	44	8	240	304	68
11	Dallas Stars	CEN	82	26	42	14	227	280	66
12	Los Angeles Kings	PAC	82	24	40	18	256	302	66
13	San Jose Sharks	PAC	82	20	55	7	252	357	47

Divisions: CEN – Central, PAC – Pacific

bold – Qualified for playoffs; p – Won Presidents' Trophy

== Schedule and results ==
1995–96 regular season
October: 4–5–1 (home: 3–1–1; road: 1–4–0)

Game	Date	Visitor	Score	Home	OT	Decision	Attendance	Record	Pts	Recap
1	October 8	Detroit Red Wings	3 – 1	Edmonton Oilers		Ranford	13,302	0–1–0	0	L
2	October 10	Edmonton Oilers	3 – 5	St. Louis Blues		Ranford	17,565	0–2–0	0	L
3	October 13	Edmonton Oilers	0 – 9	Detroit Red Wings		Ranford	19,875	0–3–0	0	L
4	October 15	Edmonton Oilers	1 – 7	Philadelphia Flyers		Ranford	17,380	0–4–0	0	L
5	October 17	Edmonton Oilers	3 – 1	New Jersey Devils		Ranford	10,698	1–4–0	2	W
6	October 18	Edmonton Oilers	1 – 4	Buffalo Sabres		Gage	10,883	1–5–0	2	L
7	October 21	Vancouver Canucks	4 – 6	Edmonton Oilers		Ranford	12,413	2–5–0	4	W
8	October 22	San Jose Sharks	1 – 1	Edmonton Oilers	OT	Ranford	9,520	2–5–1	5	T
9	October 27	Winnipeg Jets	5 – 7	Edmonton Oilers		Ranford	10,527	3–5–1	7	W
10	October 31	New Jersey Devils	1 – 2	Edmonton Oilers		Ranford	9,791	4–5–1	9	W

November: 3–7–4 (home: 1–3–2; road: 2–4–2)

Game	Date	Visitor	Score	Home	OT	Decision	Attendance	Record	Pts	Recap
11	November 1	Edmonton Oilers	3 – 3	Vancouver Canucks	OT	Ranford	15,107	4–5–2	10	T
12	November 4	Toronto Maple Leafs	3 – 3	Edmonton Oilers	OT	Ranford	13,838	4–5–3	11	T
13	November 7	Edmonton Oilers	2 – 4	Detroit Red Wings		Ranford	19,776	4–6–3	11	L
14	November 9	Edmonton Oilers	1 – 2	Florida Panthers		Ranford	10,816	4–7–3	11	L
15	November 10	Edmonton Oilers	4 – 3	Tampa Bay Lightning	OT	Ranford	20,361	5–7–3	13	W
16	November 12	Edmonton Oilers	4 – 4	Chicago Blackhawks	OT	Gage	18,116	5–7–4	14	T
17	November 14	Edmonton Oilers	2 – 4	Calgary Flames		Gage	17,570	5–8–4	14	L
18	November 15	Montreal Canadiens	4 – 1	Edmonton Oilers		Ranford	13,866	5–9–4	14	L
19	November 17	Detroit Red Wings	5 – 4	Edmonton Oilers		Ranford	10,803	5–10–4	14	L
20	November 20	Colorado Avalanche	3 – 3	Edmonton Oilers	OT	Ranford	9,384	5–10–5	15	T
21	November 22	Mighty Ducks of Anaheim	0 – 2	Edmonton Oilers		Ranford	9,052	6–10–5	17	W
22	November 24	Edmonton Oilers	5 – 2	Calgary Flames		Ranford	18,436	7–10–5	19	W
23	November 26	Edmonton Oilers	0 – 4	Winnipeg Jets		Ranford	10,070	7–11–5	19	L
24	November 28	Chicago Blackhawks	5 – 3	Edmonton Oilers		Ranford	9,312	7–12–5	19	L

December: 6–8–1 (home: 3–4–1; road: 3–4–0)

Game	Date	Visitor	Score	Home	OT	Decision	Attendance	Record	Pts	Recap
25	December 1	Calgary Flames	8 – 2	Edmonton Oilers		Ranford	14,189	7–13–5	19	L
26	December 2	St. Louis Blues	7 – 3	Edmonton Oilers		Ranford	10,506	7–14–5	19	L
27	December 5	Edmonton Oilers	2 – 6	Vancouver Canucks		Ranford	15,682	7–15–5	19	L
28	December 7	Edmonton Oilers	5 – 3	Colorado Avalanche		Ranford	16,061	8–15–5	21	W
29	December 9	Edmonton Oilers	4 – 2	San Jose Sharks		Ranford	17,190	9–15–5	23	W
30	December 10	Edmonton Oilers	3 – 1	Mighty Ducks of Anaheim		Ranford	17,174	10–15–5	25	W
31	December 13	Vancouver Canucks	2 – 2	Edmonton Oilers	OT	Ranford	9,813	10–15–6	26	T
32	December 15	Edmonton Oilers	4 – 9	Winnipeg Jets		Gage	8,504	10–16–6	26	L
33	December 18	Ottawa Senators	1 – 3	Edmonton Oilers		Ranford	8,419	11–16–6	28	W
34	December 20	Colorado Avalanche	4 – 1	Edmonton Oilers		Ranford	10,743	11–17–6	28	L
35	December 22	Edmonton Oilers	3 – 6	Washington Capitals		Ranford	11,200	11–18–6	28	L
36	December 23	Edmonton Oilers	1 – 6	Toronto Maple Leafs		Ranford	15,746	11–19–6	28	L
37	December 27	Philadelphia Flyers	2 – 3	Edmonton Oilers		Ranford	16,437	12–19–6	30	W
38	December 29	Los Angeles Kings	4 – 5	Edmonton Oilers	OT	Ranford	16,437	13–19–6	32	W
39	December 30	New York Rangers	8 – 3	Edmonton Oilers		Ranford	16,035	13–20–6	32	L

January: 5–6–0 (home: 3–5–0; road: 2–1–0)

Game	Date	Visitor	Score	Home	OT	Decision	Attendance	Record	Pts	Recap
40	January 3	Tampa Bay Lightning	5 – 0	Edmonton Oilers		Ranford	9,914	13–21–6	32	L
41	January 5	Florida Panthers	3 – 2	Edmonton Oilers		Brathwaite	11,762	13–22–6	32	L
42	January 7	Mighty Ducks of Anaheim	1 – 3	Edmonton Oilers		Gage	9,456	14–22–6	34	W
43	January 9	Hartford Whalers	5 – 1	Edmonton Oilers		Gage	9,702	14–23–6	34	L
44	January 13	Buffalo Sabres	4 – 5	Edmonton Oilers	OT	Joseph	11,589	15–23–6	36	W
45	January 16	Edmonton Oilers	5 – 1	St. Louis Blues		Joseph	19,168	16–23–6	38	W
46	January 17	Edmonton Oilers	4 – 3	Dallas Stars		Joseph	14,027	17–23–6	40	W
47	January 24	Dallas Stars	5 – 3	Edmonton Oilers		Joseph	9,335	17–24–6	40	L
48	January 26	New York Islanders	1 – 4	Edmonton Oilers		Joseph	12,149	18–24–6	42	W
49	January 30	Edmonton Oilers	2 – 3	Calgary Flames	OT	Joseph	17,724	18–25–6	42	L
50	January 31	Chicago Blackhawks	4 – 0	Edmonton Oilers		Joseph	11,984	18–26–6	42	L

February: 4–7–1 (home: 3–3–0; road: 1–4–1)

Game	Date	Visitor	Score	Home	OT	Decision	Attendance	Record	Pts	Recap
51	February 7	Washington Capitals	2 – 1	Edmonton Oilers		Joseph	9,807	18–27–6	42	L
52	February 9	Vancouver Canucks	3 – 2	Edmonton Oilers	OT	Brathwaite	13,232	18–28–6	42	L
53	February 11	Calgary Flames	2 – 4	Edmonton Oilers		Joseph	14,931	19–28–6	44	W
54	February 14	Mighty Ducks of Anaheim	2 – 3	Edmonton Oilers		Joseph	10,342	20–28–6	46	W
55	February 16	Edmonton Oilers	1 – 6	Dallas Stars		Joseph	16,541	20–29–6	46	L
56	February 18	Edmonton Oilers	1 – 4	Chicago Blackhawks		Joseph	21,917	20–30–6	46	L
57	February 19	Edmonton Oilers	5 – 7	Colorado Avalanche		Joseph	16,061	20–31–6	46	L
58	February 21	Los Angeles Kings	2 – 7	Edmonton Oilers		Joseph	13,537	21–31–6	48	W
59	February 23	Boston Bruins	7 – 4	Edmonton Oilers		Joseph	16,437	21–32–6	48	L
60	February 25	Edmonton Oilers	0 – 2	New York Islanders		Joseph	12,090	21–33–6	48	L
61	February 27	Edmonton Oilers	4 – 3	Boston Bruins	OT	Joseph	17,565	22–33–6	50	W
62	February 28	Edmonton Oilers	4 – 4	Hartford Whalers	OT	Joseph	9,360	22–33–7	51	T

March: 7–6–1 (home: 2–3–1; road: 5–3–0)

Game	Date	Visitor	Score	Home	OT	Decision	Attendance	Record	Pts	Recap
63	March 1	Pittsburgh Penguins	5 – 4	Edmonton Oilers		Joseph	16,437	22–34–7	51	L
64	March 3	St. Louis Blues	4 – 3	Edmonton Oilers		Joseph	16,437	22–35–7	51	L
65	March 6	Edmonton Oilers	2 – 3	Los Angeles Kings		Joseph	11,401	22–36–7	51	L
66	March 8	San Jose Sharks	2 – 4	Edmonton Oilers		Joseph	11,955	23–36–7	53	W
67	March 13	Edmonton Oilers	8 – 3	San Jose Sharks		Joseph	17,190	24–36–7	55	W
68	March 16	Edmonton Oilers	5 – 2	Los Angeles Kings		Joseph	12,758	25–36–7	57	W
69	March 17	Edmonton Oilers	1 – 8	Colorado Avalanche		Joseph	16,061	25–37–7	57	L
70	March 19	Edmonton Oilers	4 – 1	New York Rangers		Joseph	18,200	26–37–7	59	W
71	March 21	Edmonton Oilers	4 – 5	Pittsburgh Penguins		Joseph	17,181	26–38–7	59	L
72	March 23	Edmonton Oilers	6 – 5	Montreal Canadiens		Joseph	21,392	27–38–7	61	W
73	March 24	Edmonton Oilers	3 – 2	Ottawa Senators		Joseph	13,188	28–38–7	63	W
74	March 27	Los Angeles Kings	3 – 3	Edmonton Oilers	OT	Joseph	11,888	28–38–8	64	T
75	March 29	Winnipeg Jets	2 – 3	Edmonton Oilers		Joseph	16,437	29–38–8	66	W
76	March 30	Toronto Maple Leafs	4 – 3	Edmonton Oilers		Gage	16,437	29–39–8	66	L

April: 1–5–0 (home: 0–2–0; road: 1–3–0)

Game	Date	Visitor	Score	Home	OT	Decision	Attendance	Record	Pts	Recap
77	April 1	Edmonton Oilers	6 – 2	Vancouver Canucks		Gage	18,422	30–39–8	68	W
78	April 3	Edmonton Oilers	0 – 1	Mighty Ducks of Anaheim		Gage	17,174	30–40–8	68	L
79	April 4	Edmonton Oilers	3 – 5	San Jose Sharks		Gage	17,190	30–41–8	68	L
80	April 8	Calgary Flames	3 – 2	Edmonton Oilers		Gage	15,869	30–42–8	68	L
81	April 10	Dallas Stars	4 – 2	Edmonton Oilers		Joseph	11,671	30–43–8	68	L
82	April 13	Edmonton Oilers	3 – 6	Toronto Maple Leafs		Joseph	15,746	30–44–8	68	L

Legend: W Win (2 points) L Loss (0 points) T Tie (1 point)

== Player statistics ==
=== Scoring ===
- Position abbreviations: C = Centre; D = Defence; G = Goaltender; LW = Left wing; RW = Right wing
- † = Joined team via a transaction (e.g., trade, waivers, signing) during the season. Stats reflect time with the Oilers only.
- ‡ = Left team via a transaction (e.g., trade, waivers, release) during the season. Stats reflect time with the Oilers only.

No.	Player	Pos	Regular season					
No.	Player	Pos	GP	G	A	Pts	+/-	PIM
39	Doug Weight	C	82	25	79	104	−19	95
8	Zdeno Ciger	LW	78	31	39	70	−15	41
7	Jason Arnott	C	64	28	31	59	−6	87
20	David Oliver	RW	80	20	19	39	−22	34
26	Todd Marchant	C	81	19	19	38	−19	66
32	Miroslav Satan	RW	62	18	17	35	0	22
2	Boris Mironov	D	78	8	24	32	−23	101
37	Dean McAmmond	LW	53	15	15	30	6	23
10	Mariusz Czerkawski†	RW	37	12	17	29	7	8
16	Kelly Buchberger	RW	82	11	14	25	−20	184
6	Jeff Norton†	D	30	4	16	20	5	16
17	Scott Thornton	C	77	9	9	18	−25	149
24	Bryan Marchment	D	78	3	15	18	−7	202
28	Jiri Slegr	D	57	4	13	17	−1	74
22	Luke Richardson	D	82	2	9	11	−27	108
94	Ryan Smyth	LW	48	2	9	11	−10	28
9	Glenn Anderson†‡	RW	17	4	6	10	0	27
27	Peter White‡	C	26	5	3	8	−14	0
21	Igor Kravchuk‡	D	26	4	4	8	−13	10
19	Kent Manderville†	LW	37	3	5	8	−5	38
18	Kirk Maltby‡	RW	49	2	6	8	−16	61
6	Ken Sutton‡	D	32	0	8	8	−12	39
34	Donald Dufresne†	D	42	1	6	7	−2	16
5	Brett Hauer	D	29	4	2	6	−11	30
15	David Roberts†	LW	6	2	4	6	0	6
15	Fredrik Olausson‡	D	20	0	6	6	−14	14
29	Louie DeBrusk	LW	38	1	3	4	−7	96
27	Ralph Intranuovo	C	13	1	2	3	−3	4
25	Greg de Vries	D	13	1	1	2	−2	12
64	Jason Bonsignore	C	20	0	2	2	−6	4
12	Tyler Wright	C	23	1	0	1	−7	33
31	Curtis Joseph	G	34	0	1	1		4
30	Bill Ranford‡	G	37	0	1	1		2
36	Dennis Bonvie	RW	8	0	0	0	−3	47
40 (Note: Brathwaite wore number 31 in his first four games.)	Fred Brathwaite	G	7	0	0	0		2
1	Joaquin Gage	G	16	0	0	0		4
35	Bryan Muir†	D	5	0	0	0	−4	6
23	Nick Stajduhar	D	2	0	0	0	2	4

=== Goaltending ===
- ‡ = Left team via a transaction (e.g., trade, waivers, release) during the season. Stats reflect time with the Oilers only.

No.	Player	Regular season									
No.	Player	GP	W	L	T	SA	GA	GAA	SV%	SO	TOI
31	Curtis Joseph	34	15	16	2	971	111	3.44	.886	0	1936
30	Bill Ranford‡	37	13	18	5	1024	128	3.81	.875	1	2015
1	Joaquin Gage	16	2	8	1	350	45	3.77	.871	0	717
40	Fred Brathwaite	7	0	2	0	140	12	2.45	.914	0	293

== Awards and records ==
=== Awards ===
Type	Award/honour	Recipient	Ref
League (in-season)	NHL All-Star Game selection	Doug Weight	
League (in-season)	NHL Rookie of the Month	Miroslav Satan (March)	
Team	Community Service Award	Luke Richardson	
Team	Defenceman of the Year	Bryan Marchment	
Team	Molson Cup	Doug Weight	
Team	Most Popular Player	Doug Weight	
Team	Top Defensive Forward	Kelly Buchberger	
Team	Top First Year Oiler	Curtis Joseph	
Team	Unsung Hero	Zdeno Ciger	
Team	Zane Feldman Trophy	Doug Weight	

=== Records ===
- 1,292: A new Oilers record for most penalty minutes in a career by Kelly Buchberger on December 20, 1995.
- 424:: A new Oilers record for most games played in a career by a goaltender by Bill Ranford on December 9, 1995.

=== Milestones ===
Regular Season
Player	Milestone	Reached
Kelly Buchberger	500th NHL Game	October 10, 1995
Luke Richardson	1,000th NHL PIM	October 15, 1995
Miroslav Satan	1st NHL Game	October 15, 1995
Miroslav Satan	1st NHL Goal; 1st NHL Point	October 21, 1995
Fredrik Olausson	600th NHL Game	October 22, 1995
Miroslav Satan	1st NHL Assist	October 27, 1995
Doug Weight	200th NHL Point	October 27, 1995
Brett Hauer	1st NHL Game	November 7, 1995
Brett Hauer	1st NHL Goal; 1st NHL Point	November 10, 1995
Igor Kravchuk	200th NHL Game	November 14, 1995
Bryan Marchment	1,000th NHL PIM	November 15, 1995
Doug Weight	1st NHL Hat-trick	November 20, 1995
Ryan Smyth	1st NHL Goal; 1st NHL Point	November 24, 1995
Jason Bonsignore	1st NHL Assist; 1st NHL Point	December 1, 1995
Scott Thornton	300th NHL PIM	December 1, 1995
Ryan Smyth	1st NHL Assist	December 5, 1995
Bill Ranford	20th NHL Assist	December 18, 1995
Bryan Marchment	300th NHL Game	December 20, 1995
Kelly Buchberger	1,300th NHL PIM	December 23, 1995
Boris Mironov	200th NHL PIM	December 23, 1995
Scott Thornton	200th NHL Game	December 23, 1995
Kelly Buchberger	100th NHL Assist	December 27, 1995
Doug Weight	300th NHL Game	December 27, 1995
Nick Stajduhar	1st NHL Game	January 3, 1996
Zdeno Ciger	100th NHL Assist	January 7, 1996
Greg de Vries	1st NHL Game	January 17, 1996
Brett Hauer	1st NHL Assist	January 17, 1996
Luke Richardson	600th NHL Game	January 31, 1996
Glenn Anderson	1,100th NHL Game	February 7, 1996
Todd Marchant	100th NHL Game	February 7, 1996
Bryan Marchment	1,100th NHL PIM	February 9, 1996
David Oliver	100th NHL Game	February 19, 1996
Greg de Vries	1st NHL Goal; 1st NHL Point	February 21, 1996
Ralph Intranuovo	1st NHL Goal	February 21, 1996
Mariusz Czerkawski	100th NHL Game	February 23, 1996
Glenn Anderson	1,100th NHL PIM	February 27, 1996
Bryan Muir	1st NHL Game	March 8, 1996
Scott Thornton	400th NHL PIM	March 8, 1996
Jason Arnott	300th NHL PIM	March 16, 1996
Doug Weight	200th NHL Assist	March 16, 1996
Jason Arnott	2nd NHL Hat-trick	March 23, 1996
Dean McAmmond	100th NHL Game	March 23, 1996
Todd Marchant	100th NHL PIM	March 29, 1996
Jiri Slegr	200th NHL Game	March 29, 1996
Zdeno Ciger	200th NHL Point	March 30, 1996
Greg de Vries	1st NHL Assist	April 4, 1996
Louie DeBrusk	700th NHL PIM	April 8, 1996
Kent Manderville	200th NHL Game	April 8, 1996

== Transactions ==
=== Trades ===
August 4, 1995	To St. Louis Blues 1st round pick in 1996; 1st round pick in 1997	To Edmonton Oilers Curtis Joseph; Mike Grier
August 24, 1995	To Vancouver Canucks 7th round pick in 1997	To Edmonton Oilers Brett Hauer
December 4, 1995	To Toronto Maple Leafs Peter White; 4th round pick in 1996	To Edmonton Oilers Kent Manderville
January 4, 1996	To St. Louis Blues Ken Sutton; Igor Kravchuk	To Edmonton Oilers Jeff Norton; Donald Dufresne
January 11, 1996	To Boston Bruins Bill Ranford	To Edmonton Oilers Mariusz Czerkawski; Sean Brown; 1st round pick in 1996
March 12, 1996	To St. Louis Blues Future considerations	To Edmonton Oilers David Roberts
March 20, 1996	To Detroit Red Wings Kirk Maltby	To Edmonton Oilers Dan McGillis

=== Free agents ===
Player	Former team
F Rem Murray	Los Angeles Kings

Player	New team
F Shayne Corson	St. Louis Blues
F Mike Stapleton	Winnipeg Jets
F Micah Aivazoff	New York Islanders
F Davis Payne	Boston Bruins
F Iain Fraser	Winnipeg Jets

=== Waivers ===
Date	Player	Team
January 16, 1996	Fredrik Olausson	to Mighty Ducks of Anaheim
January 25, 1996	Glenn Anderson	from Vancouver Canucks
March 12, 1996	Glenn Anderson	to St. Louis Blues

== Draft picks ==
Edmonton's draft picks at the 1995 NHL entry draft.

Round	#	Player	Nationality	College/Junior/Club team (League)
1	6	Steve Kelly	Canada	Prince Albert Raiders (WHL)
2	31	Georges Laraque	Canada	St-Jean Lynx (QMJHL)
3	57	Lukas Zib	Czech Republic	Ceske Budejovice HC (Czech.)
4	83	Mike Minard	Canada	Chilliwack Chiefs (BCJHL)
5	109	Jan Snopek	Czech Republic	Oshawa Generals (OHL)
7	161	Martin Cerven	Czech Republic	Dukla Trencin (Czech.)
8	187	Stephen Douglas	Canada	Niagara Falls Thunder (OHL)
9	213	Jiri Antonin	Czech Republic	Pardubice HC (Czech.)
