= 1996–97 Edmonton Oilers season =

NHL team season

1996–97 Edmonton Oilers
- Division: 3rd Pacific
- Conference: 7th Western
- 1996–97 record: 36–37–9
- Home record: 21–16–4
- Road record: 15–21–5
- Goals for: 252
- Goals against: 247

Team information
- General manager: Glen Sather
- Coach: Ron Low
- Captain: Kelly Buchberger
- Alternate captains: Luke Richardson; Doug Weight
- Arena: Edmonton Coliseum
- Average attendance: 16,043 (93.8%)
- Minor league affiliates: Hamilton Bulldogs (AHL); Wheeling Nailers (ECHL)

Team leaders
- Goals: Ryan Smyth (39)
- Assists: Doug Weight (61)
- Points: Doug Weight (82)
- Penalty minutes: Kelly Buchberger (159)
- Plus/minus: Bryan Marchment (+13)
- Wins: Curtis Joseph (32)
- Goals against average: Bob Essensa (2.83)

The 1996–97 Edmonton Oilers season was the Oilers' 18th season in the NHL. They were coming off a 30–44–8 record, earning 68 points in the 1995–96 season, which led them to failing to qualify for the post-season for the 4th time in a row.

The Oilers had their best season since 1991–92 as they won 36 games and earn 81 points, finishing third place in the Pacific Division and seventh in the Western Conference, earning their first playoff berth in five years. The main reason for the Oilers' turn-around was their solid goaltending and defensive hockey, only allowing 247 goals, 57 fewer than the previous season.

== Regular season ==
On November 26, 1996, the Oilers defeated their provincial rival Calgary Flames on the road by a score of 10-1. Ten different Oilers scored in the game. It was the first time that the Oilers had scored 10 goals in a regular-season game since December 4, 1988, when they defeated the New York Rangers at home by a score of 10-6.

Offensively, Doug Weight led the club once again this season in points, earning 82, and achieved a club high 61 assists. Ryan Smyth had a breakout season, scoring a team high 39 goals and led the team in power play goals with 20. Andrei Kovalenko, acquired in the off-season, scored 32 goals and 59 points, while Jason Arnott earned 57 points in 67 games. Rookie Mike Grier had 32 points in 79 games, and Mariusz Czerkawski finished third on the team in goals with 26. Boris Mironov anchored the defense, earning 32 points in only 55 games. Todd Marchant led the team in short-handed goals with 4. Team captain Kelly Buchberger provided the team toughness, earning a club high 159 penalty minutes.

In goal, Curtis Joseph got the majority of playing time, winning 32 games while posting a 2.93 GAA and a .907 save percentage. He set a team record with 6 shutouts. Bob Essensa, despite a strong GAA of 2.83, won only 4 games.

The Oilers had the most power-play opportunities during the regular season, with 406 opportunities in total.

=== Season standings ===
Pacific Division
No.	CR		GP	W	L	T	GF	GA	Pts
1	1	**Colorado Avalanche**	82	49	24	9	277	205	107
2	4	**Mighty Ducks of Anaheim**	82	36	33	13	243	231	85
3	7	**Edmonton Oilers**	82	36	37	9	252	247	81
4	9	Vancouver Canucks	82	35	40	7	257	273	77
5	10	Calgary Flames	82	32	41	9	214	239	73
6	12	Los Angeles Kings	82	28	43	11	214	268	67
7	13	San Jose Sharks	82	27	47	8	211	278	62

Note: CR = Conference rank; GP = Games played; W = Wins; L = Losses; T = Ties; GF = Goals for; GA = Goals against; Pts = Points
Bolded teams qualified for the playoffs.

Western Conference
R		Div	GP	W	L	T	GF	GA	Pts
**1**	**p – Colorado Avalanche**	**PAC**	**82**	**49**	**24**	**9**	**277**	**205**	**107**
**2**	**Dallas Stars**	**CEN**	**82**	**48**	**26**	**8**	**252**	**198**	**104**
**3**	**Detroit Red Wings**	**CEN**	**82**	**38**	**26**	**18**	**253**	**197**	**94**
**4**	**Mighty Ducks of Anaheim**	**PAC**	**82**	**36**	**33**	**13**	**245**	**233**	**85**
**5**	**Phoenix Coyotes**	**CEN**	**82**	**38**	**37**	**7**	**240**	**243**	**83**
**6**	**St. Louis Blues**	**CEN**	**82**	**36**	**35**	**11**	**236**	**239**	**83**
**7**	**Edmonton Oilers**	**PAC**	**82**	**36**	**37**	**9**	**252**	**247**	**81**
**8**	**Chicago Blackhawks**	**CEN**	**82**	**34**	**35**	**13**	**223**	**210**	**81**
9	Vancouver Canucks	PAC	82	35	40	7	257	273	77
10	Calgary Flames	PAC	82	32	41	9	214	239	73
11	Toronto Maple Leafs	CEN	82	30	44	8	230	273	68
12	Los Angeles Kings	PAC	82	28	43	11	214	268	67
13	San Jose Sharks	PAC	82	27	47	8	211	278	62

Divisions: CEN – Central, PAC – Pacific

bold – Qualified for playoffs; p – Won Presidents' Trophy

== Playoffs ==
The Oilers faced the Central Division winning Dallas Stars in the opening round of the playoffs. After splitting the first 2 games in Dallas, the Oilers returned home for game 3 for their first home playoff game since 1992 and found themselves losing 3–0 with about 4 minutes left in the 3rd period. Edmonton then struck for 3 goals to tie the game, and Kelly Buchberger provided the overtime heroics, as the Oilers won the game 4–3 and take a 2–1 series lead. Dallas tied the series up again in game 4, however, the Oilers shocked the Stars, winning 1–0 in double overtime in the 5th game in Dallas, and returning to Edmonton in a position to clinch the series. The Stars spoiled the Oilers' party, winning the 6th game 3–2, setting up a game 7 at Reunion Arena in Dallas. The game was a memorable one, as the score was tied up at 3 as the teams headed into overtime. Todd Marchant turned out to be the hero, scoring for the Oilers in the 1st overtime, as Edmonton completed the upset, defeating the Stars in 7 games.

In the 2nd round, Edmonton faced the defending Stanley Cup champions, the Colorado Avalanche, who won the Pacific Division and had 26 more points than the Oilers during the season. The Avalanche won the opening 2 games easily in Denver, and while the Oilers rebounded to win the 3rd game, the Avs proved to be too much for Edmonton to handle, as they won the series in 5 games, ending the Oilers' season.

== Schedule and results ==
=== Regular season ===
1996–97 regular season
October: 7–5–0 (home: 4–2–0; road: 3–3–0)

Game	Date	Visitor	Score	Home	OT	Decision	Attendance	Record	Pts	Recap
1	October 4	Buffalo Sabres	3 – 4	Edmonton Oilers		Joseph	15,236	1–0–0	2	W
2	October 6	Vancouver Canucks	0 – 2	Edmonton Oilers		Joseph	15,144	2–0–0	4	W
3	October 8	Edmonton Oilers	4 – 2	Toronto Maple Leafs		Joseph	15,424	3–0–0	6	W
4	October 9	Edmonton Oilers	0 – 2	Detroit Red Wings		Essensa	19,983	3–1–0	6	L
5	October 11	St. Louis Blues	3 – 1	Edmonton Oilers		Joseph	16,145	3–2–0	6	L
6	October 14	Edmonton Oilers	6 – 3	Phoenix Coyotes		Joseph	13,916	4–2–0	8	W
7	October 15	Edmonton Oilers	2 – 7	Colorado Avalanche		Joseph	16,061	4–3–0	8	L
8	October 20	Edmonton Oilers	3 – 6	Calgary Flames		Joseph	16,295	4–4–0	8	L
9	October 22	Pittsburgh Penguins	2 – 5	Edmonton Oilers		Joseph	16,536	5–4–0	10	W
10	October 24	Edmonton Oilers	8 – 2	Los Angeles Kings		Essensa	10,195	6–4–0	12	W
11	October 26	Colorado Avalanche	4 – 2	Edmonton Oilers		Joseph	17,099	6–5–0	12	L
12	October 30	Phoenix Coyotes	1 – 4	Edmonton Oilers		Joseph	14,678	7–5–0	14	W

November: 6–7–1 (home: 2–3–1; road: 4–4–0)

Game	Date	Visitor	Score	Home	OT	Decision	Attendance	Record	Pts	Recap
13	November 1	Vancouver Canucks	5 – 4	Edmonton Oilers	OT	Joseph	16,177	7–6–0	14	L
14	November 3	Edmonton Oilers	2 – 4	Chicago Blackhawks		Joseph	16,875	7–7–0	14	L
15	November 6	Edmonton Oilers	2 – 5	Pittsburgh Penguins		Essensa	15,159	7–8–0	14	L
16	November 7	Edmonton Oilers	6 – 0	Boston Bruins		Joseph	13,643	8–8–0	16	W
17	November 9	Edmonton Oilers	3 – 7	Toronto Maple Leafs		Joseph	15,726	8–9–0	16	L
18	November 11	Edmonton Oilers	2 – 3	Montreal Canadiens	OT	Joseph	20,452	8–10–0	16	L
19	November 13	Edmonton Oilers	4 – 0	Ottawa Senators		Joseph	15,312	9–10–0	18	W
20	November 17	Dallas Stars	7 – 3	Edmonton Oilers		Joseph	14,574	9–11–0	18	L
21	November 19	Chicago Blackhawks	4 – 4	Edmonton Oilers	OT	Joseph	14,792	9–11–1	19	T
22	November 21	New York Rangers	2 – 3	Edmonton Oilers		Joseph	17,099	10–11–1	21	W
23	November 23	Calgary Flames	2 – 3	Edmonton Oilers		Joseph	16,829	11–11–1	23	W
24	November 26	Edmonton Oilers	10 – 1	Calgary Flames		Joseph	17,146	12–11–1	25	W
25	November 27	Los Angeles Kings	5 – 1	Edmonton Oilers		Essensa	14,039	12–12–1	25	L
26	November 29	Edmonton Oilers	4 – 2	San Jose Sharks		Joseph	17,442	13–12–1	27	W

December: 4–7–3 (home: 3–4–1; road: 1–3–2)

Game	Date	Visitor	Score	Home	OT	Decision	Attendance	Record	Pts	Recap
27	December 1	Edmonton Oilers	2 – 4	Mighty Ducks of Anaheim		Joseph	16,735	13–13–1	27	L
28	December 4	Edmonton Oilers	0 – 2	Colorado Avalanche		Joseph	16,061	13–14–1	27	L
29	December 6	Ottawa Senators	2 – 5	Edmonton Oilers		Joseph	15,060	14–14–1	29	W
30	December 8	St. Louis Blues	3 – 2	Edmonton Oilers		Joseph	14,922	14–15–1	29	L
31	December 10	Edmonton Oilers	0 – 0	Detroit Red Wings	OT	Joseph	19,983	14–15–2	30	T
32	December 12	Edmonton Oilers	2 – 2	Tampa Bay Lightning	OT	Joseph	13,925	14–15–3	31	T
33	December 15	Edmonton Oilers	3 – 6	Florida Panthers		Essensa	14,703	14–16–3	31	L
34	December 18	Colorado Avalanche	4 – 4	Edmonton Oilers	OT	Joseph	16,053	14–16–4	32	T
35	December 20	New Jersey Devils	3 – 2	Edmonton Oilers		Joseph	14,692	14–17–4	32	L
36	December 22	Detroit Red Wings	6 – 2	Edmonton Oilers		Joseph	16,724	14–18–4	32	L
37	December 23	Edmonton Oilers	7 – 0	Vancouver Canucks		Essensa	17,854	15–18–4	34	W
38	December 27	Philadelphia Flyers	6 – 4	Edmonton Oilers		Joseph	17,099	15–19–4	34	L
39	December 28	San Jose Sharks	3 – 5	Edmonton Oilers		Essensa	16,670	16–19–4	36	W
40	December 30	Los Angeles Kings	1 – 2	Edmonton Oilers		Joseph	15,954	17–19–4	38	W

January: 8–3–1 (home: 5–1–0; road: 3–2–1)

Game	Date	Visitor	Score	Home	OT	Decision	Attendance	Record	Pts	Recap
41	January 3	Toronto Maple Leafs	3 – 4	Edmonton Oilers		Joseph	17,099	18–19–4	40	W
42	January 7	Edmonton Oilers	5 – 2	St. Louis Blues		Joseph	15,760	19–19–4	42	W
43	January 8	Edmonton Oilers	1 – 4	Chicago Blackhawks		Essensa	17,500	19–20–4	42	L
44	January 11	San Jose Sharks	2 – 1	Edmonton Oilers		Joseph	15,451	19–21–4	42	L
45	January 12	Hartford Whalers	1 – 2	Edmonton Oilers	OT	Joseph	14,301	20–21–4	44	W
46	January 15	Florida Panthers	0 – 4	Edmonton Oilers		Joseph	15,673	21–21–4	46	W
47	January 21	Edmonton Oilers	4 – 4	New York Rangers	OT	Joseph	18,200	21–21–5	47	T
48	January 22	Edmonton Oilers	1 – 8	New York Islanders		Joseph	10,438	21–22–5	47	L
49	January 24	Edmonton Oilers	3 – 1	Buffalo Sabres		Joseph	16,775	22–22–5	49	W
50	January 26	Edmonton Oilers	3 – 1	Washington Capitals		Joseph	14,623	23–22–5	51	W
51	January 29	San Jose Sharks	1 – 3	Edmonton Oilers		Joseph	14,378	24–22–5	53	W
52	January 31	New York Islanders	0 – 1	Edmonton Oilers		Joseph	16,211	25–22–5	55	W

February: 4–6–2 (home: 4–2–0; road: 0–4–2)

Game	Date	Visitor	Score	Home	OT	Decision	Attendance	Record	Pts	Recap
53	February 5	Calgary Flames	2 – 5	Edmonton Oilers		Joseph	16,770	26–22–5	57	W
54	February 8	Mighty Ducks of Anaheim	2 – 1	Edmonton Oilers	OT	Joseph	16,743	26–23–5	57	L
55	February 9	Washington Capitals	1 – 4	Edmonton Oilers		Essensa	15,361	27–23–5	59	W
56	February 12	Boston Bruins	3 – 4	Edmonton Oilers		Joseph	16,238	28–23–5	61	W
57	February 13	Edmonton Oilers	2 – 3	Calgary Flames	OT	Essensa	18,882	28–24–5	61	L
58	February 15	Edmonton Oilers	2 – 2	Los Angeles Kings	OT	Joseph	12,027	28–24–6	62	T
59	February 17	Edmonton Oilers	1 – 5	Mighty Ducks of Anaheim		Joseph	17,174	28–25–6	62	L
60	February 19	Toronto Maple Leafs	5 – 6	Edmonton Oilers		Joseph	16,487	29–25–6	64	W
61	February 21	Colorado Avalanche	4 – 3	Edmonton Oilers	OT	Joseph	17,099	29–26–6	64	L
62	February 23	Edmonton Oilers	1 – 6	Dallas Stars		Joseph	15,786	29–27–6	64	L
63	February 26	Edmonton Oilers	3 – 3	Mighty Ducks of Anaheim	OT	Joseph	17,174	29–27–7	65	T
64	February 27	Edmonton Oilers	3 – 6	Los Angeles Kings		Essensa	12,115	29–28–7	65	L

March: 6–7–0 (home: 2–3–0; road: 4–4–0)

Game	Date	Visitor	Score	Home	OT	Decision	Attendance	Record	Pts	Recap
65	March 1	Montreal Canadiens	5 – 4	Edmonton Oilers		Joseph	17,099	29–29–7	65	L
66	March 4	Los Angeles Kings	1 – 4	Edmonton Oilers		Joseph	14,671	30–29–7	67	W
67	March 7	Edmonton Oilers	1 – 2	Dallas Stars		Joseph	16,723	30–30–7	67	L
68	March 9	Edmonton Oilers	4 – 1	St. Louis Blues		Joseph	17,982	31–30–7	69	W
69	March 11	Edmonton Oilers	1 – 6	New Jersey Devils		Joseph	14,671	31–31–7	69	L
70	March 13	Edmonton Oilers	4 – 5	Philadelphia Flyers	OT	Joseph	19,635	31–32–7	69	L
71	March 15	Edmonton Oilers	4 – 2	Hartford Whalers		Joseph	14,437	32–32–7	71	W
72	March 19	Tampa Bay Lightning	1 – 3	Edmonton Oilers		Joseph	16,089	33–32–7	73	W
73	March 23	Mighty Ducks of Anaheim	4 – 1	Edmonton Oilers		Joseph	17,099	33–33–7	73	L
74	March 24	Edmonton Oilers	5 – 1	San Jose Sharks		Joseph	17,159	34–33–7	75	W
75	March 28	Edmonton Oilers	3 – 4	San Jose Sharks		Joseph	17,442	34–34–7	75	L
76	March 29	Edmonton Oilers	3 – 1	Phoenix Coyotes		Joseph	16,210	35–34–7	77	W
77	March 31	Dallas Stars	3 – 1	Edmonton Oilers		Joseph	17,099	35–35–7	77	L

April: 1–2–2 (home: 1–1–2; road: 0–1–0)

Game	Date	Visitor	Score	Home	OT	Decision	Attendance	Record	Pts	Recap
78	April 3	Chicago Blackhawks	2 – 4	Edmonton Oilers		Joseph	17,099	36–35–7	79	W
79	April 5	Vancouver Canucks	2 – 2	Edmonton Oilers	OT	Joseph	17,099	36–35–8	80	T
80	April 9	Detroit Red Wings	3 – 3	Edmonton Oilers	OT	Joseph	17,099	36–35–9	81	T
81	April 11	Phoenix Coyotes	6 – 2	Edmonton Oilers		Joseph	17,099	36–36–9	81	L
82	April 12	Edmonton Oilers	4 – 5	Vancouver Canucks		Essensa	18,422	36–37–9	81	L

Legend: W Win (2 points) L Loss (0 points) T Tie (1 point)

=== Playoffs ===
1997 Stanley Cup playoffs
Western Conference Quarterfinals vs. (2) Dallas Stars – Oilers win 4–3

Game	Date	Visitor	Score	Home	OT	Decision	Attendance	Series	Recap
1	April 16	Edmonton Oilers	3 – 5	Dallas Stars		Joseph	16,418	0–1	L
2	April 18	Edmonton Oilers	4 – 0	Dallas Stars		Joseph	16,924	1–1	W
3	April 20	Dallas Stars	3 – 4	Edmonton Oilers	OT	Joseph	17,099	2–1	W
4	April 22	Dallas Stars	4 – 3	Edmonton Oilers		Joseph	17,099	2–2	L
5	April 25	Edmonton Oilers	1 – 0	Dallas Stars	2OT	Joseph	16,924	3–2	W
6	April 27	Dallas Stars	3 – 2	Edmonton Oilers		Joseph	17,099	3–3	L
7	April 29	Edmonton Oilers	4 – 3	Dallas Stars	OT	Joseph	16,924	4–3	W

Western Conference Semifinals vs. (1) Colorado Avalanche – Avalanche win 4–1

Game	Date	Visitor	Score	Home	OT	Decision	Attendance	Series	Recap
1	May 2	Edmonton Oilers	1 – 5	Colorado Avalanche		Joseph	16,061	0–1	L
2	May 4	Edmonton Oilers	1 – 4	Colorado Avalanche		Joseph	16,061	0–2	L
3	May 7	Colorado Avalanche	3 – 4	Edmonton Oilers		Joseph	17,099	1–2	W
4	May 9	Colorado Avalanche	3 – 2	Edmonton Oilers	OT	Joseph	17,099	1–3	L
5	May 11	Edmonton Oilers	3 – 4	Colorado Avalanche		Joseph	16,061	1–4	L

Legend: W Win L Loss

== Player statistics ==
=== Scoring ===
- Position abbreviations: C = Centre; D = Defence; G = Goaltender; LW = Left wing; RW = Right wing
- † = Joined team via a transaction (e.g., trade, waivers, signing) during the season. Stats reflect time with the Oilers only.
- ‡ = Left team via a transaction (e.g., trade, waivers, release) during the season. Stats reflect time with the Oilers only.

No.	Player	Pos	Regular season						Playoffs					
No.	Player	Pos	GP	G	A	Pts	+/-	PIM	GP	G	A	Pts	+/-	PIM
39	Doug Weight	C	80	21	61	82	1	80	12	3	8	11	0	8
94	Ryan Smyth	LW	82	39	22	61	−7	76	12	5	5	10	−4	12
51	Andrei Kovalenko	RW	74	32	27	59	−5	81	12	4	3	7	1	6
7	Jason Arnott	C	67	19	38	57	−21	92	12	3	6	9	−3	18
21	Mariusz Czerkawski	LW	76	26	21	47	0	16	12	2	1	3	−2	10
16	Kelly Buchberger	RW	81	8	30	38	4	159	12	5	2	7	−1	16
26	Todd Marchant	LW	79	14	19	33	11	44	12	4	2	6	2	12
25	Mike Grier	RW	79	15	17	32	7	45	12	3	1	4	−2	4
2	Boris Mironov	D	55	6	26	32	2	85	12	2	8	10	−6	16
17	Rem Murray	C	82	11	20	31	9	16	12	1	2	3	−1	4
37	Dean McAmmond	LW	57	12	17	29	−15	28	—	—	—	—	—	—
18 (Note: Satan wore number 32 in his first six games.)	Miroslav Satan‡	LW	64	17	11	28	−4	22	—	—	—	—	—	—
14	Mats Lindgren	C	69	11	14	25	−7	12	12	0	4	4	−2	0
23 (Note: McGillis wore number 18 in his first seven games.)	Dan McGillis	D	73	6	16	22	2	52	12	0	5	5	8	24
24	Bryan Marchment	D	71	3	13	16	13	132	3	0	0	0	−3	4
4	Kevin Lowe	D	64	1	13	14	−1	50	1	0	0	0	−1	0
6	Jeff Norton‡	D	62	2	11	13	−7	42	—	—	—	—	—	—
22	Luke Richardson	D	82	1	11	12	9	91	12	0	2	2	−4	14
8	Michel Petit†‡	D	18	2	4	6	−13	20	—	—	—	—	—	—
85	Petr Klima†	RW	16	1	5	6	−1	6	6	0	0	0	0	4
5	Greg de Vries	D	37	0	4	4	−2	52	12	0	1	1	4	8
20	David Oliver‡	RW	17	1	2	3	−8	4	—	—	—	—	—	—
29	Louie DeBrusk	LW	32	2	0	2	−6	94	6	0	0	0	0	4
31	Curtis Joseph	G	72	0	2	2		20	12	0	0	0		2
9	Ralph Intranuovo†	C	5	1	0	1	0	0	—	—	—	—	—	—
10	Steve Kelly	C	8	1	0	1	−1	6	6	0	0	0	1	2
55	Drew Bannister†	D	1	0	1	1	−2	0	12	0	0	0	−4	30
34	Donald Dufresne	D	22	0	1	1	−1	15	3	0	0	0	0	0
12	Jesse Belanger	C	6	0	0	0	−3	0	—	—	—	—	—	—
8	Sean Brown	D	5	0	0	0	−1	4	—	—	—	—	—	—
30	Bob Essensa	G	19	0	0	0		4	—	—	—	—	—	—
15	Joe Hulbig	LW	6	0	0	0	−1	0	6	0	1	1	2	2
35	Craig Millar†	D	1	0	0	0	0	2	—	—	—	—	—	—
18 (Note: Moore wore number 20 in his first three games.)	Barrie Moore†	LW	4	0	0	0	0	0	—	—	—	—	—	—
35	Bryan Muir	D	—	—	—	—	—	—	5	0	0	0	−2	4

=== Goaltending ===
No.	Player	Regular season										Playoffs								
No.	Player	GP	W	L	T	SA	GA	GAA	SV%	SO	TOI	GP	W	L	SA	GA	GAA	SV%	SO	TOI
31	Curtis Joseph	72	32	29	9	2144	200	2.93	.907	6	4100	12	5	7	405	36	2.81	.911	2	767
30	Bob Essensa	19	4	8	0	406	41	2.83	.899	1	868	—	—	—	—	—	—	—	—	—

== Awards and records ==
=== Awards ===
Type	Award/honour	Recipient	Ref
League (in-season)	NHL All-Star Game selection	Jason Arnott	
Team	Community Service Award	Jason Arnott	
Team	Defenceman of the Year	Bryan Marchment	
Team	Molson Cup	Curtis Joseph	
Team	Most Popular Player	Curtis Joseph	
Team	Top Defensive Forward	Kelly Buchberger	
Team	Top First Year Oiler	Mike Grier	
Team	Unsung Hero	Doug Weight	
Team	Zane Feldman Trophy	Curtis Joseph	

=== Records ===
- 3: Tied NHL record for most short-handed goals in a playoffs by Todd Marchant on May 11, 1997.

=== Milestones ===
Regular Season
Player	Milestone	Reached
Mike Grier	1st NHL Game	October 4, 1996
Dan McGillis	1st NHL Game; 1st NHL Assist; 1st NHL Point	October 4, 1996
Rem Murray	1st NHL Game; 1st NHL Goal; 1st NHL Point	October 4, 1996
Kelly Buchberger	1,400th NHL PIM	October 8, 1996
Rem Murray	1st NHL Assist	October 8, 1996
Ryan Smyth	1st NHL Hat-trick	October 8, 1996
Luke Richardson	1,100th NHL PIM	October 11, 1996
Louie DeBrusk	200th NHL Game	October 20, 1996
Mike Grier	1st NHL Assist; 1st NHL Point	October 20, 1996
Doug Weight	300th NHL Point	October 20, 1996
Rem Murray	1st NHL Hat-trick	October 24, 1996
Mike Grier	1st NHL Goal	October 26, 1996
Doug Weight	300th NHL PIM	November 1, 1996
Mats Lindgren	1st NHL Game; 1st NHL Goal; 1st NHL Point	November 3, 1996
Andrei Kovalenko	100th NHL Assist	November 6, 1996
Mats Lindgren	1st NHL Assist	November 6, 1996
Jason Arnott	200th NHL Game	November 7, 1996
Mariusz Czerkawski	1st NHL Hat-trick; 1st NHL Natural hat-trick	November 7, 1996
Jason Arnott	100th NHL Assist	November 9, 1996
Bryan Marchment	1,200th NHL PIM	November 9, 1996
Curtis Joseph	20th NHL Assist	November 13, 1996
Boris Mironov	200th NHL Game	November 13, 1996
Kelly Buchberger	600th NHL Game	November 17, 1996
Andrei Kovalenko	200th NHL Point	November 23, 1996
Dan McGillis	1st NHL Goal	November 26, 1996
Bob Essensa	300th NHL Game	November 27, 1996
Kevin Lowe	1,200th NHL Game	December 1, 1996
Michel Petit	1,700th NHL PIM	December 4, 1996
Andrei Kovalenko	200th NHL PIM	December 12, 1996
Andrei Kovalenko	100th NHL Goal	December 18, 1996
Boris Mironov	300th NHL PIM	December 23, 1996
Andrei Kovalenko	300th NHL Game	December 30, 1996
Miroslav Satan	100th NHL Game	January 7, 1997
Jason Arnott	200th NHL Point	January 15, 1997
Curtis Joseph	10th NHL Shutout	January 15, 1997
Ryan Smyth	100th NHL Game	January 24, 1997
Jeff Norton	500th NHL Game	January 24, 1997
Mariusz Czerkawski	100th NHL Point	February 9, 1997
Jeff Norton	400th NHL PIM	February 9, 1997
Doug Weight	400th NHL Game	February 9, 1997
Bryan Marchment	400th NHL Game	February 13, 1997
Mariusz Czerkawski	2nd NHL Hat-trick	February 19, 1997
Boris Mironov	100th NHL Point	February 19, 1997
Sean Brown	1st NHL Game	February 21, 1997
Kelly Buchberger	1,500th NHL PIM	February 21, 1997
Ryan Smyth	100th NHL PIM	March 1, 1997
Joe Hulbig	1st NHL Game	March 4, 1997
Luke Richardson	700th NHL Game	March 9, 1997
Jeff Norton	300th NHL Point	March 11, 1997
Kelly Buchberger	200th NHL Point	March 19, 1997
Craig Millar	1st NHL Game	March 19, 1997
Todd Marchant	200th NHL Game	March 23, 1997
Steve Kelly	1st NHL Game	March 24, 1997
Luke Richardson	100th NHL Point	March 28, 1997
Steve Kelly	1st NHL Goal; 1st NHL Point	March 29, 1997
Jason Arnott	400th NHL PIM	April 4, 1997
Doug Weight	100th NHL Goal	April 5, 1997

Playoffs
Player	Milestone	Reached
Jason Arnott	1st NHL Game; 1st NHL Assist; 1st NHL Point	April 16, 1997
Mats Lindgren	1st NHL Game; 1st NHL Assist; 1st NHL Point	April 16, 1997
Dan McGillis	1st NHL Game; 1st NHL Assist; 1st NHL Point	April 16, 1997
Boris Mironov	1st NHL Game; 1st NHL Assist; 1st NHL Point	April 16, 1997
Rem Murray	1st NHL Game; 1st NHL Assist; 1st NHL Point	April 16, 1997
Drew Bannister	1st NHL Game	April 16, 1997
Greg de Vries	1st NHL Game	April 16, 1997
Louie DeBrusk	1st NHL Game	April 16, 1997
Mike Grier	1st NHL Game	April 16, 1997
Ryan Smyth	1st NHL Game	April 16, 1997
Todd Marchant	1st NHL Game; 1st NHL Goal; 1st NHL Point	April 16, 1997
Bryan Marchment	50th NHL PIM	April 16, 1997
Mike Grier	1st NHL Goal; 1st NHL Point	April 18, 1997
Boris Mironov	1st NHL Goal	April 18, 1997
Ryan Smyth	1st NHL Goal; 1st NHL Assist; 1st NHL Point	April 18, 1997
Todd Marchant	1st NHL Assist	April 20, 1997
Jason Arnott	1st NHL Goal	April 22, 1997
Bryan Muir	1st NHL Game	April 22, 1997
Mike Grier	1st NHL Assist	April 29, 1997
Joe Hulbig	1st NHL Game; 1st NHL Assist; 1st NHL Point	April 29, 1997
Rem Murray	1st NHL Goal	April 29, 1997
Steve Kelly	1st NHL Game	April 29, 1997
Greg de Vries	1st NHL Assist; 1st NHL Point	May 7, 1997

== Transactions ==
=== Trades ===
June 14, 1996	To Detroit Red Wings Future considerations	To Edmonton Oilers Bob Essensa
June 22, 1996	To Pittsburgh Penguins Tyler Wright	To Edmonton Oilers 7th round pick in 1996
September 6, 1996	To Montreal Canadiens Scott Thornton	To Edmonton Oilers Andrei Kovalenko
March 18, 1997	To Buffalo Sabres Miroslav Satan	To Edmonton Oilers Barrie Moore; Craig Millar
March 18, 1997	To Tampa Bay Lightning Jeff Norton	To Edmonton Oilers Drew Bannister; 6th round pick in 1997

=== Free agents ===
Player	Former team
D Terran Sandwith	Kansas City Blades (IHL)
D Bryan Muir	New Hampshire Wildcats (NCAA)
F Jeff Daw	UMass Lowell River Hawks (NCAA)
F Jesse Belanger	Vancouver Canucks
D Kevin Lowe	New York Rangers
D Michel Petit	Tampa Bay Lightning
F Petr Klima	Pittsburgh Penguins

Player	New team
F David Roberts	Vancouver Canucks
F Kent Manderville	Hartford Whalers

=== Waivers ===
Date	Player	Team
September 30, 1996	Ralph Intranuovo	to Toronto Maple Leafs
October 25, 1996	Ralph Intranuovo	from Toronto Maple Leafs
January 17, 1997	Michel Petit	to Philadelphia Flyers
February 21, 1997	David Oliver	to New York Rangers

== Draft picks ==
Edmonton's draft picks at the 1996 NHL entry draft.

Round	#	Player	Nationality	College/Junior/Club team (League)
1	6	Boyd Devereaux	Canada	Kitchener Rangers (OHL)
1	19	Matthieu Descoteaux	Canada	Shawinigan Cataractes (QMJHL)
2	32	Chris Hajt	Canada	Guelph Storm (OHL)
3	59	Tom Poti	United States	Cushing Academy (USHS)
5	114	Brian Urick	United States	Notre Dame Fighting Irish (NCAA)
6	141	Bryan Randall	Canada	Medicine Hat Tigers (WHL)
7	168	David Bernier	Canada	St-Hyacinthe Lasers (QMJHL)
7	170	Brandon Lafrance	Canada	Ohio State Buckeyes (NCAA)
8	195	Fernando Pisani	Canada	St. Albert Saints (AJHL)
9	221	John Hultberg	United States	Dubuque Fighting Saints (USHL)
