= List of Edmonton Oilers award winners =

Edmonton Oilers awards
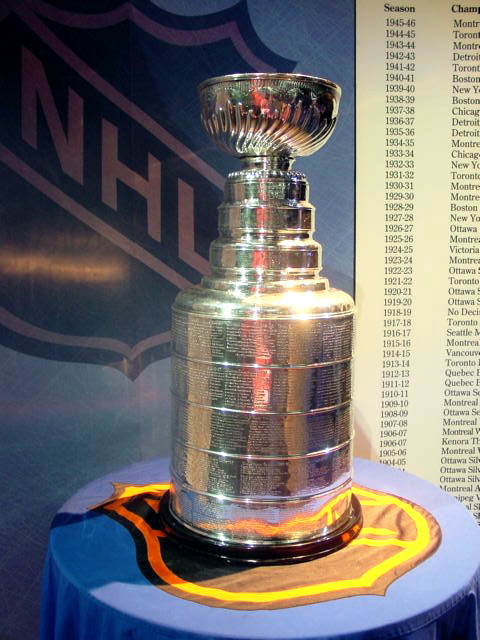
- The Edmonton Oilers have won the Stanley Cup (above) five times.

Team trophies
- Award*: Wins
- Stanley Cup: 5
- Clarence S. Campbell Bowl: 9
- Presidents' Trophy: 2

Individual awards
- Award*: Wins
- Art Ross Trophy: 13
- Charlie Conacher Memorial Trophy: 1
- Conn Smythe Trophy: 5
- Hart Memorial Trophy: 13
- Jack Adams Award: 1
- James Norris Memorial Trophy: 2
- King Clancy Memorial Trophy: 3
- Lady Byng Memorial Trophy: 2
- Maurice "Rocket" Richard Trophy: 2
- NHL Man of the Year Award: 1
- NHL Plus-Minus Award: 4
- Ted Lindsay Award: 12
- Vezina Trophy: 1

Total
- Awards won: 76

This is a list of Edmonton Oilers award winners.

== League awards ==
=== Team trophies ===
Team trophies awarded to the Edmonton Oilers
Award	Description	Times won	Seasons	References
Stanley Cup	NHL championship	5	1983–84, 1984–85, 1986–87, 1987–88, 1989–90	
Clarence S. Campbell Bowl	Campbell/Western Conference playoff championship	9	1982–83, 1983–84, 1984–85, 1986–87, 1987–88, 1989–90, 2005–06, 2023–24, 2024–25	
Presidents' Trophy	Most regular season points	2	1985–86, 1986–87	

=== Individual awards ===
Individual awards won by Edmonton Oilers players and staff
Award	Description	Winner	Season	References
Art Ross Trophy	Regular season scoring champion	Wayne Gretzky	1980–81	
Art Ross Trophy	Regular season scoring champion	Wayne Gretzky	1981–82	
Art Ross Trophy	Regular season scoring champion	Wayne Gretzky	1982–83	
Art Ross Trophy	Regular season scoring champion	Wayne Gretzky	1983–84	
Art Ross Trophy	Regular season scoring champion	Wayne Gretzky	1984–85	
Art Ross Trophy	Regular season scoring champion	Wayne Gretzky	1985–86	
Art Ross Trophy	Regular season scoring champion	Wayne Gretzky	1986–87	
Art Ross Trophy	Regular season scoring champion	Connor McDavid	2016–17	
Art Ross Trophy	Regular season scoring champion	Connor McDavid	2017–18	
Art Ross Trophy	Regular season scoring champion	Connor McDavid	2020–21	
Art Ross Trophy	Regular season scoring champion	Connor McDavid	2021–22	
Art Ross Trophy	Regular season scoring champion	Connor McDavid	2022–23	
Art Ross Trophy	Regular season scoring champion	Connor McDavid	2025–26	
Art Ross Trophy	Regular season scoring champion	Leon Draisaitl	2019–20	
Ben Hatskin Trophy (WHA)	Top goaltender	Dave Dryden	1978–79	
Conn Smythe Trophy	Most valuable player of the playoffs	Mark Messier	1983–84	
Conn Smythe Trophy	Most valuable player of the playoffs	Wayne Gretzky	1984–85	
Conn Smythe Trophy	Most valuable player of the playoffs	Wayne Gretzky	1987–88	
Conn Smythe Trophy	Most valuable player of the playoffs	Bill Ranford	1989–90	
Conn Smythe Trophy	Most valuable player of the playoffs	Connor McDavid	2023–24	
Gordie Howe Trophy (WHA)	Most valuable player	Dave Dryden	1978–79	
Hart Memorial Trophy	Most valuable player to his team during the regular season	Wayne Gretzky	1979–80	
Hart Memorial Trophy	Most valuable player to his team during the regular season	Wayne Gretzky	1980–81	
Hart Memorial Trophy	Most valuable player to his team during the regular season	Wayne Gretzky	1981–82	
Hart Memorial Trophy	Most valuable player to his team during the regular season	Wayne Gretzky	1982–83	
Hart Memorial Trophy	Most valuable player to his team during the regular season	Wayne Gretzky	1983–84	
Hart Memorial Trophy	Most valuable player to his team during the regular season	Wayne Gretzky	1984–85	
Hart Memorial Trophy	Most valuable player to his team during the regular season	Wayne Gretzky	1985–86	
Hart Memorial Trophy	Most valuable player to his team during the regular season	Wayne Gretzky	1986–87	
Hart Memorial Trophy	Most valuable player to his team during the regular season	Mark Messier	1989–90	
Hart Memorial Trophy	Most valuable player to his team during the regular season	Connor McDavid	2016–17	
Hart Memorial Trophy	Most valuable player to his team during the regular season	Connor McDavid	2020–21	
Hart Memorial Trophy	Most valuable player to his team during the regular season	Connor McDavid	2022–23	
Hart Memorial Trophy	Most valuable player to his team during the regular season	Leon Draisaitl	2019–20	
Jack Adams Award	Top coach during the regular season	Glen Sather	1985–86	
James Norris Memorial Trophy	Top defenceman during the regular season	Paul Coffey	1984–85	
James Norris Memorial Trophy	Top defenceman during the regular season	Paul Coffey	1985–86	
King Clancy Memorial Trophy	Leadership qualities on and off the ice and humanitarian contributions within their community	Kevin Lowe	1989–90	
King Clancy Memorial Trophy	Leadership qualities on and off the ice and humanitarian contributions within their community	Ethan Moreau	2008–09	
King Clancy Memorial Trophy	Leadership qualities on and off the ice and humanitarian contributions within their community	Andrew Ference	2013–14	
Lady Byng Memorial Trophy	Gentlemanly conduct	Wayne Gretzky	1979–80	
Lady Byng Memorial Trophy	Gentlemanly conduct	Jari Kurri	1984–85	
Lou Kaplan Trophy (WHA)	Rookie of the year	Wayne Gretzky	1978–79	
Maurice "Rocket" Richard Trophy	Most goals in the regular season	Connor McDavid	2022–23	
Maurice "Rocket" Richard Trophy	Most goals in the regular season	Leon Draisaitl	2024–25	
NHL Man of the Year Award	Sportsmanship and involvement with charitable groups	Kevin Lowe	1989–90	
NHL Plus-Minus Award	Highest plus/minus	Charlie Huddy	1982–83	
NHL Plus-Minus Award	Highest plus/minus	Wayne Gretzky	1983–84	
NHL Plus-Minus Award	Highest plus/minus	Wayne Gretzky	1984–85	
NHL Plus-Minus Award	Highest plus/minus	Wayne Gretzky	1986–87	
Paul Deneau Trophy (WHA)	Player who displays gentlemanly conduct	Mike Rogers	1974–75	
Ted Lindsay Award	Most valuable player as chosen by the players	Wayne Gretzky	1981–82	
Ted Lindsay Award	Most valuable player as chosen by the players	Wayne Gretzky	1982–83	
Ted Lindsay Award	Most valuable player as chosen by the players	Wayne Gretzky	1983–84	
Ted Lindsay Award	Most valuable player as chosen by the players	Wayne Gretzky	1984–85	
Ted Lindsay Award	Most valuable player as chosen by the players	Wayne Gretzky	1986–87	
Ted Lindsay Award	Most valuable player as chosen by the players	Mark Messier	1989–90	
Ted Lindsay Award	Most valuable player as chosen by the players	Connor McDavid	2016–17	
Ted Lindsay Award	Most valuable player as chosen by the players	Connor McDavid	2017–18	
Ted Lindsay Award	Most valuable player as chosen by the players	Connor McDavid	2020–21	
Ted Lindsay Award	Most valuable player as chosen by the players	Connor McDavid	2022–23	
Ted Lindsay Award	Most valuable player as chosen by the players	Connor McDavid	2025–26	
Ted Lindsay Award	Most valuable player as chosen by the players	Leon Draisaitl	2019–20	
Vezina Trophy	Top goaltender	Grant Fuhr	1987–88	

== All-Stars ==
=== WHA First and Second Team All-Stars ===
Edmonton Oilers selected to the WHA First and Second Team All-Stars
Player	Position	Selections	Season	Team
Dave Dryden	Goaltender	1	1978–79	1st
Wayne Gretzky	Centre	1	1978–79	2nd
Al Hamilton	Defence	2	1973–74	2nd
Al Hamilton	Defence	2	1977–78	1st
Dave Langevin	Defence	1	1978–79	2nd
Barry Long	Defence	1	1974–75	2nd
Blair MacDonald	Right wing	1	1978–79	2nd
Paul Shmyr	Defence	1	1978–79	2nd

=== NHL first and second team All-Stars ===
The NHL first and second team All-Stars are the top players at each position as voted on by the Professional Hockey Writers' Association.

Edmonton Oilers selected to the NHL First and Second Team All-Stars
Player	Position	Selections	Season	Team
Evan Bouchard	Defence	1	2025–26	2nd
Paul Coffey	Defence	5	1981–82	2nd
Paul Coffey	Defence	5	1982–83	2nd
Paul Coffey	Defence	5	1983–84	2nd
Paul Coffey	Defence	5	1984–85	1st
Paul Coffey	Defence	5	1985–86	1st
Leon Draisaitl	Centre	3	2019–20	1st
Leon Draisaitl	Centre	3	2022–23	2nd
Leon Draisaitl	Centre	3	2024–25	2nd
Grant Fuhr	Goaltender	2	1981–82	2nd
Grant Fuhr	Goaltender	2	1987–88	1st
Wayne Gretzky	Centre	9	1979–80	2nd
Wayne Gretzky	Centre	9	1980–81	1st
Wayne Gretzky	Centre	9	1981–82	1st
Wayne Gretzky	Centre	9	1982–83	1st
Wayne Gretzky	Centre	9	1983–84	1st
Wayne Gretzky	Centre	9	1984–85	1st
Wayne Gretzky	Centre	9	1985–86	1st
Wayne Gretzky	Centre	9	1986–87	1st
Wayne Gretzky	Centre	9	1987–88	2nd
Jari Kurri	Right wing	5	1983–84	2nd
Jari Kurri	Right wing	5	1984–85	1st
Jari Kurri	Right wing	5	1985–86	2nd
Jari Kurri	Right wing	5	1986–87	1st
Jari Kurri	Right wing	5	1988–89	2nd
Connor McDavid	Centre	8	2016–17	1st
Connor McDavid	Centre	8	2017–18	1st
Connor McDavid	Centre	8	2018–19	1st
Connor McDavid	Centre	8	2020–21	1st
Connor McDavid	Centre	8	2021–22	2nd
Connor McDavid	Centre	8	2022–23	1st
Connor McDavid	Centre	8	2023–24	2nd
Connor McDavid	Centre	8	2025–26	1st
Mark Messier	Left wing	4	1981–82	1st
Mark Messier	Left wing	4	1982–83	1st
Mark Messier	Left wing	4	1983–84	2nd
Mark Messier	Centre	4	1989–90	1st

=== NHL All-Rookie Team ===
The NHL All-Rookie Team consists of the top rookies at each position as voted on by the Professional Hockey Writers' Association.

Edmonton Oilers selected to the NHL All-Rookie Team
Player	Position	Season
Jason Arnott	Forward	1993–94
Tom Gilbert	Defence	2007–08
Connor McDavid	Forward	2015–16
Boris Mironov	Defence	1993–94
Ryan Nugent-Hopkins	Forward	2011–12
Tom Poti	Defence	1998–99
Justin Schultz	Defence	2012–13
Stuart Skinner	Goaltender	2022–23
Geoff Smith	Defence	1989–90

=== All-Star Game selections ===
The National Hockey League All-Star Game is a mid-season exhibition game held annually between many of the top players of each season. Thirty-three All-Star Games have been held since the Oilers entered the league in 1979, with at least one player chosen to represent the Oilers in each year except 2004. The All-Star game has not been held in various years: 1979 and 1987 due to the 1979 Challenge Cup and Rendez-vous '87 series between the NHL and the Soviet national team, respectively, 1995, 2005, and 2013 as a result of labor stoppages, 2006, 2010, 2014 and 2026 because of the Winter Olympic Games, 2021 as a result of the COVID-19 pandemic, and 2025 when it was replaced by the 2025 4 Nations Face-Off. Edmonton has hosted one of the games. The 40th took place at Northlands Coliseum.

- † Selected by fan vote
- # Selected as one of four "last men in" by fan vote
- ↑ All-Star Game Most Valuable Player

Edmonton Oilers players and coaches selected to the All-Star Game
Game	Year	Name	Position	References
32nd	1980	Wayne Gretzky	Centre	
32nd	1980	Blair MacDonald	Right wing	
33rd	1981	Wayne Gretzky	Centre	
34th	1982	Paul Coffey	Defence	
34th	1982	Grant Fuhr	Goaltender	
34th	1982	Wayne Gretzky	Centre	
34th	1982	Mark Messier	Left wing	
35th	1983	Paul Coffey	Defence	
35th	1983	Wayne Gretzky↑	Centre	
35th	1983	Jari Kurri	Left wing	
35th	1983	Mark Messier	Left wing	
36th	1984	Glenn Anderson	Right wing	
36th	1984	Paul Coffey	Defence	
36th	1984	Grant Fuhr	Goaltender	
36th	1984	Wayne Gretzky	Centre	
36th	1984	Jari Kurri (Did not play)	Right wing	
36th	1984	Kevin Lowe	Defence	
36th	1984	Mark Messier	Left wing	
36th	1984	Glen Sather	Coach	
37th	1985	Glenn Anderson	Right wing	
37th	1985	Paul Coffey	Defence	
37th	1985	Grant Fuhr	Goaltender	
37th	1985	Wayne Gretzky	Centre	
37th	1985	Mike Krushelnyski	Centre	
37th	1985	Jari Kurri	Right wing	
37th	1985	Kevin Lowe	Defence	
37th	1985	Andy Moog	Goaltender	
37th	1985	Glen Sather	Coach	
38th	1986	Glenn Anderson†	Left wing	
38th	1986	Paul Coffey†	Defence	
38th	1986	Lee Fogolin	Defence	
38th	1986	Grant Fuhr†↑	Goaltender	
38th	1986	Wayne Gretzky†	Centre	
38th	1986	Jari Kurri†	Right wing	
38th	1986	Kevin Lowe	Defence	
38th	1986	Mark Messier	Left wing	
38th	1986	Andy Moog	Goaltender	
38th	1986	Glen Sather	Coach	
39th	1988	Glenn Anderson	Left wing	
39th	1988	Grant Fuhr†	Goaltender	
39th	1988	Wayne Gretzky†	Centre	
39th	1988	Jari Kurri†	Right wing	
39th	1988	Kevin Lowe†	Defence	
39th	1988	Mark Messier	Left wing	
39th	1988	Glen Sather	Coach	
40th	1989	Jimmy Carson	Centre	
40th	1989	Grant Fuhr†	Goaltender	
40th	1989	Jari Kurri†	Right wing	
40th	1989	Kevin Lowe†	Defence	
40th	1989	Mark Messier	Centre	
40th	1989	Glen Sather	Coach	
41st	1990	Jari Kurri	Right wing	
41st	1990	Kevin Lowe†	Defence	
41st	1990	Mark Messier	Centre	
42nd	1991	Mark Messier	Centre	
42nd	1991	John Muckler	Coach	
42nd	1991	Bill Ranford	Goaltender	
42nd	1991	Steve Smith	Defence	
43rd	1992	Vincent Damphousse	Left wing	
44th	1993	Dave Manson	Defence	
45th	1994	Shayne Corson	Left wing	
46th	1996	Doug Weight	Centre	
47th	1997	Jason Arnott	Centre	
48th	1998	Doug Weight	Centre	
49th	1999	Roman Hamrlik	Defence	
50th	2000	Tommy Salo	Goaltender	
51st	2001	Janne Niinimaa	Defence	
51st	2001	Doug Weight	Centre	
52nd	2002	Tommy Salo	Goaltender	
53rd	2003	Eric Brewer	Defence	
54th	2004	No Oilers selected	—	
55th	2007	Ryan Smyth	Left wing	
56th	2008	Shawn Horcoff	Centre	
57th	2009	Sheldon Souray	Defence	
58th	2011	Ales Hemsky (Did not play)	Right wing	
59th	2012	Jordan Eberle	Right wing	
60th	2015	Ryan Nugent-Hopkins	Centre	
61st	2016	Taylor Hall	Left wing	
62nd	2017	Connor McDavid†	Centre	
63rd	2018	Connor McDavid†	Centre	
64th	2019	Leon Draisaitl#	Centre	
64th	2019	Connor McDavid†	Centre	
65th	2020	Leon Draisaitl	Centre	
65th	2020	Connor McDavid†	Centre	
66th	2022	Leon Draisaitl	Centre	
66th	2022	Connor McDavid†	Centre	
67th	2023	Leon Draisaitl†	Centre	
67th	2023	Connor McDavid	Centre	
67th	2023	Stuart Skinner†	Goaltender	
68th	2024	Leon Draisaitl†	Centre	
68th	2024	Connor McDavid	Centre	

=== All-Star Game replacement events ===
- † Selected by fan vote

Edmonton Oilers players and coaches selected to All-Star Game replacement events
Event	Year	Name	Position	References
Rendez-vous '87	1987	Glenn Anderson	Left wing	
Rendez-vous '87	1987	Paul Coffey† (Did not play)	Defence	
Rendez-vous '87	1987	Grant Fuhr	Goaltender	
Rendez-vous '87	1987	Wayne Gretzky	Centre	
Rendez-vous '87	1987	Jari Kurri	Right wing	
Rendez-vous '87	1987	Mark Messier	Centre	
Rendez-vous '87	1987	Esa Tikkanen	Right wing	
4 Nations Face-Off	2025	Viktor Arvidsson (Sweden)	Right wing	
4 Nations Face-Off	2025	Mattias Ekholm (Sweden)	Defence	
4 Nations Face-Off	2025	Connor McDavid (Canada)	Centre	

== Career achievements ==
=== Hockey Hall of Fame ===
The following is a list of Edmonton Oilers who have been enshrined in the Hockey Hall of Fame.

Edmonton Oilers inducted into the Hockey Hall of Fame
Individual	Category	Year inducted	Years with Oilers in category	References
Glenn Anderson	Player	2008	1980–1991, 1995–1996	
Paul Coffey	Player	2004	1980–1987	
Clare Drake	Builder	2017	1975–1976	
Grant Fuhr	Player	2003	1981–1991	
Wayne Gretzky	Player	1999	1978–1988	
Ken Hitchcock	Builder	2023	2018–2019	
Ken Holland	Builder	2020	2019–2024	
Duncan Keith	Player	2025	2021–2022	
Jari Kurri	Player	2001	1980–1990	
Kevin Lowe	Player	2020	1979–1992, 1997–1998	
Mark Messier	Player	2007	1979–1991	
Roger Neilson	Builder	2002	1984	
Adam Oates	Player	2012	2003–2004	
Jacques Plante	Player	1978	1974–1975	
Chris Pronger	Player	2015	2005–2006	
Pat Quinn	Builder	2016	2009–2010	
Glen Sather	Builder	1997	1976–2000	
Norm Ullman	Player	1982	1975–1977	

=== Foster Hewitt Memorial Award ===
One member of the Edmonton Oilers organization has been honored with the Foster Hewitt Memorial Award. The award is presented by the Hockey Hall of Fame to members of the radio and television industry who make outstanding contributions to their profession and the game of ice hockey during their broadcasting career.

Members of the Edmonton Oilers honored with the Foster Hewitt Memorial Award
Individual	Year honored	Years with Oilers as broadcaster	References
Rod Phillips	2003	1973–2010	

=== Retired numbers ===
The Edmonton Oilers have retired eight of their jersey numbers. Wayne Gretzky's number 99 was also retired league-wide on February 6, 2000.

Edmonton Oilers retired numbers
Number	Player	Position	Years with Oilers as a player	Date of retirement ceremony	References
3	Al Hamilton	Defence	1972–1980	October 10, 1980	
4	Kevin Lowe	Defence	1979–1992, 1997–1998	November 5, 2021	
7	Paul Coffey	Defence	1980–1987	October 18, 2005	
9	Glenn Anderson	Right wing	1980–1991, 1995–1996	January 18, 2009	
11	Mark Messier	Left wing, Centre	1979–1991	February 27, 2007	
17	Jari Kurri	Right wing	1980–1990	October 6, 2001	
31	Grant Fuhr	Goaltender	1981–1991	October 9, 2003	
99	Wayne Gretzky	Centre	1978–1988	October 1, 1999	

== Team awards ==
=== Community Service Award ===
The Community Service Award is an annual award given to a player chosen by the Oilers Hockey Operations department.

Season	Winner
1987–88	Mike Krushelnyski
1988–89	Kevin Lowe
1989–90	Craig Simpson
1990–91	Craig Simpson
1991–92	Kevin Lowe
1992–93	Craig Simpson
1993–94	Kelly Buchberger
1994–95	Bill Ranford
1995–96	Luke Richardson
1996–97	Jason Arnott

Season	Winner
1997–98	Todd Marchant
1998–99	Pat Falloon
1999–00	Todd Marchant
2000–01	Not awarded
2001–02	Georges Laraque
2002–03	Georges Laraque
2003–04	Georges Laraque
2005–06	Georges Laraque
2006–07	Jarret Stoll
2007–08	Ethan Moreau

Season	Winner
2008–09	Ethan Moreau
2009–10	Jason Strudwick
2010–11	Jason Strudwick
2011–12	Shawn Horcoff
2012–13	Ryan Smyth
2013–14	Andrew Ference
2014–15	Andrew Ference
2015–16	Matt Hendricks
2016–17	Matt Hendricks
2017–18	Ryan Nugent-Hopkins

=== Defenceman of the Year ===
The Defenceman of the Year award is an annual award given to the team's top defenceman as chosen by the Edmonton sports media.

Season	Winner
1979–80	Doug Hicks
1980–81	Lee Fogolin
1981–82	Kevin Lowe
1982–83	Charlie Huddy
1983–84	Paul Coffey
1984–85	Paul Coffey
1985–86	Paul Coffey
1986–87	Kevin Lowe
1987–88	Kevin Lowe
1988–89	Charlie Huddy
1989–90	Craig Muni
1990–91	Steve Smith
1991–92	Norm Maciver

Season	Winner
1992–93	Luke Richardson
1993–94	Igor Kravchuk
1994–95	Luke Richardson
1995–96	Bryan Marchment
1996–97	Bryan Marchment
1997–98	Boris Mironov
1998–99	Roman Hamrlik
1999–00	Jason Smith
2000–01	Jason Smith
2001–02	Janne Niinimaa
2002–03	Steve Staios
2003–04	Jason Smith
2005–06	Chris Pronger

Season	Winner
2006–07	Jason Smith
2007–08	Tom Gilbert
2008–09	Ryan Whitney
2009–10	Tom Gilbert
2010–11	Ryan Whitney
2011–12	Ladislav Smid
2012–13	Ladislav Smid
2013–14	Justin Schultz
2014–15	Oscar Klefbom
2015–16	Brandon Davidson
2016–17	Oscar Klefbom
2017–18	Darnell Nurse

=== Molson Cup ===
The Molson Cup is an annual award given to "the player who accumulates the most votes in the three-star voting process" during the regular season.

Season	Winner
1979–80	Wayne Gretzky
1980–81	Wayne Gretzky
1981–82	Wayne Gretzky
1982–83	Wayne Gretzky
1983–84	Wayne Gretzky
1984–85	Wayne Gretzky
1985–86	Wayne Gretzky
1986–87	Wayne Gretzky
1987–88	Wayne Gretzky
1988–89	Grant Fuhr
1989–90	Mark Messier
1990–91	Bill Ranford
1991–92	Joe Murphy

Season	Winner
1992–93	Bill Ranford
1993–94	Bill Ranford
1994–95	Bill Ranford
1995–96	Doug Weight
1996–97	Curtis Joseph
1997–98	Curtis Joseph
1998–99	Bill Guerin
1999–00	Tommy Salo
2000–01	Tommy Salo
2001–02	Tommy Salo
2002–03	Tommy Salo
2003–04	Ryan Smyth
2005–06	Ryan Smyth

Season	Winner
2006–07	Dwayne Roloson
2007–08	Mathieu Garon
2008–09	Dwayne Roloson
2009–10	Jeff Deslauriers
2010–11	Taylor Hall
2011–12	Taylor Hall
2012–13	Devan Dubnyk
2013–14	Taylor Hall
2014–15	Jordan Eberle
2015–16	Cam Talbot
2016–17	Connor McDavid
2017–18	Connor McDavid

=== Most Popular Player ===
The Most Popular Player award is an annual award given to the team's most popular player as "selected by an on-line vote of Oilers fans."

Season	Winner
1987–88	Wayne Gretzky
1988–89	Mark Messier
1989–90	Mark Messier
1990–91	Mark Messier
1991–92	Kelly Buchberger
1992–93	Kelly Buchberger
1993–94	Shayne Corson
1994–95	Kirk Maltby
1995–96	Doug Weight
1996–97	Curtis Joseph

Season	Winner
1997–98	Curtis Joseph
1998–99	Doug Weight
1999–00	Georges Laraque
2000–01	Doug Weight
2001–02	Mike Comrie
2002–03	Ryan Smyth
2003–04	Ryan Smyth
2005–06	Ryan Smyth
2006–07	Dwayne Roloson
2007–08	Ales Hemsky

Season	Winner
2008–09	Ales Hemsky
2009–10	Ales Hemsky
2010–11	Ryan Jones
2011–12	Jordan Eberle
2012–13	Taylor Hall
2013–14	Ryan Smyth
2014–15	Ryan Nugent-Hopkins
2015–16	Connor McDavid
2016–17	Connor McDavid
2017–18	Connor McDavid

=== Top Defensive Forward ===
The Top Defensive Forward award is an annual award given to the team's top defensive forward as "selected by an on-line vote of Oilers fans."

Season	Winner
1987–88	Craig MacTavish
1988–89	Esa Tikkanen
1989–90	Craig MacTavish
1990–91	Craig MacTavish
1991–92	Craig MacTavish
1992–93	Kelly Buchberger
1993–94	Kelly Buchberger
1994–95	Kelly Buchberger
1995–96	Kelly Buchberger
1996–97	Kelly Buchberger

Season	Winner
1997–98	Mats Lindgren
1998–99	Todd Marchant
1999–00	Mike Grier
2000–01	Todd Marchant
2001–02	Todd Marchant
2002–03	Todd Marchant
2003–04	Shawn Horcoff
2005–06	Ethan Moreau
2006–07	Fernando Pisani
2007–08	Fernando Pisani

Season	Winner
2008–09	Shawn Horcoff
2009–10	Dustin Penner
2010–11	Shawn Horcoff
2011–12	Shawn Horcoff
2012–13	Ryan Nugent-Hopkins
2013–14	Boyd Gordon
2014–15	Boyd Gordon
2015–16	Mark Letestu
2016–17	Ryan Nugent-Hopkins
2017–18	Ryan Nugent-Hopkins

=== Top First Year Oiler ===
The Top First Year Oiler award is an annual award given to the team's top first year player as "selected by an on-line vote of Oilers fans."

- † Presented to the top playoff performer.

Season	Winner
1979–80	Dave Lumley
1980–81	Glenn Anderson
1981–82	Grant Fuhr
1982–83	Randy Gregg
1983–84	Mark Messier†
1984–85	Mike Krushelnyski
1985–86	Craig MacTavish
1986–87	Craig Muni
1987–88	Craig Simpson
1988–89	Jimmy Carson
1989–90	Geoff Smith
1990–91	Anatoli Semenov
1991–92	Vincent Damphousse
1992–93	Shayne Corson

Season	Winner
1993–94	Jason Arnott
1994–95	Todd Marchant
1995–96	Curtis Joseph
1996–97	Mike Grier
1997–98	Roman Hamrlik
1998–99	Tom Poti
1999–00	Jim Dowd
2000–01	Not awarded
2001–02	Not awarded
2002–03	Ales Hemsky
2003–04	Not awarded
2005–06	Matt Greene
2006–07	Ladislav Smid

Season	Winner
2007–08	Andrew Cogliano
2007–08	Sam Gagner
2008–09	Lubomir Visnovsky
2009–10	Gilbert Brule
2010–11	Taylor Hall
2011–12	Ryan Nugent-Hopkins
2012–13	Justin Schultz
2012–13	Nail Yakupov
2013–14	David Perron
2014–15	Benoit Pouliot
2015–16	Connor McDavid
2016–17	Adam Larsson
2017–18	Ryan Strome

=== Unsung Hero ===
The Unsung Hero award is an annual award given to the team's unsung hero as "selected by an on-line vote of Oilers fans."

Season	Winner
1987–88	Charlie Huddy
1988–89	Charlie Huddy
1989–90	Bill Ranford
1990–91	Petr Klima
1991–92	Joe Murphy
1992–93	Craig MacTavish
1993–94	Shayne Corson
1994–95	David Oliver
1995–96	Zdeno Ciger
1996–97	Doug Weight

Season	Winner
1997–98	Dean McAmmond
1998–99	Mike Grier
1999–00	Ethan Moreau
2000–01	Not awarded
2001–02	Steve Staios
2002–03	Ethan Moreau
2003–04	Igor Ulanov
2005–06	Fernando Pisani
2006–07	Marty Reasoner
2007–08	Steve Staios

Season	Winner
2008–09	Jason Strudwick
2009–10	Jason Strudwick
2010–11	Ryan Jones
2011–12	Ladislav Smid
2012–13	Jeff Petry
2013–14	Matt Hendricks
2014–15	Matt Hendricks
2015–16	Matt Hendricks
2016–17	Zack Kassian
2017–18	Adam Larsson

=== Zane Feldman Trophy ===
The Zane Feldman Trophy is an annual award given to the team's most valuable player as "selected by an on-line vote of Oilers fans."

Season	Winner
1979–80	Blair MacDonald
1980–81	Wayne Gretzky
1981–82	Wayne Gretzky
1982–83	Wayne Gretzky
1983–84	Wayne Gretzky
1984–85	Wayne Gretzky
1985–86	Wayne Gretzky
1986–87	Wayne Gretzky
1987–88	Wayne Gretzky
1988–89	Jari Kurri
1989–90	Mark Messier
1990–91	Bill Ranford
1991–92	Bill Ranford

Season	Winner
1992–93	Bill Ranford
1993–94	Bill Ranford
1994–95	Jason Arnott
1995–96	Doug Weight
1996–97	Curtis Joseph
1997–98	Doug Weight
1998–99	Bill Guerin
1999–00	Tommy Salo
2000–01	Tommy Salo
2001–02	Tommy Salo
2002–03	Todd Marchant
2002–03	Tommy Salo
2003–04	Ethan Moreau

Season	Winner
2005–06	Chris Pronger
2006–07	Dwayne Roloson
2007–08	Ales Hemsky
2008–09	Ales Hemsky
2009–10	Dustin Penner
2010–11	Taylor Hall
2011–12	Jordan Eberle
2012–13	Taylor Hall
2013–14	Taylor Hall
2014–15	Ryan Nugent-Hopkins
2015–16	Taylor Hall
2016–17	Connor McDavid
2017–18	Connor McDavid

== Other awards ==
Edmonton Oilers who have received non-NHL awards
Award	Description	Winner	Season	References
Charlie Conacher Humanitarian Award	For humanitarian or community service projects	Wayne Gretzky	1979–80	
Lionel Conacher Award	Canada's male athlete of the year	Wayne Gretzky	1980	
Lionel Conacher Award	Canada's male athlete of the year	Wayne Gretzky	1981	
Lionel Conacher Award	Canada's male athlete of the year	Wayne Gretzky	1982	
Lionel Conacher Award	Canada's male athlete of the year	Wayne Gretzky	1983	
Lionel Conacher Award	Canada's male athlete of the year	Wayne Gretzky	1985	
Lou Marsh Trophy	Canada's top athlete	Wayne Gretzky	1982	
Lou Marsh Trophy	Canada's top athlete	Wayne Gretzky	1983	
Lou Marsh Trophy	Canada's top athlete	Wayne Gretzky	1985	

== See also ==
- List of National Hockey League awards
