= Matt Hendricks =

American ice hockey player (born 1981)

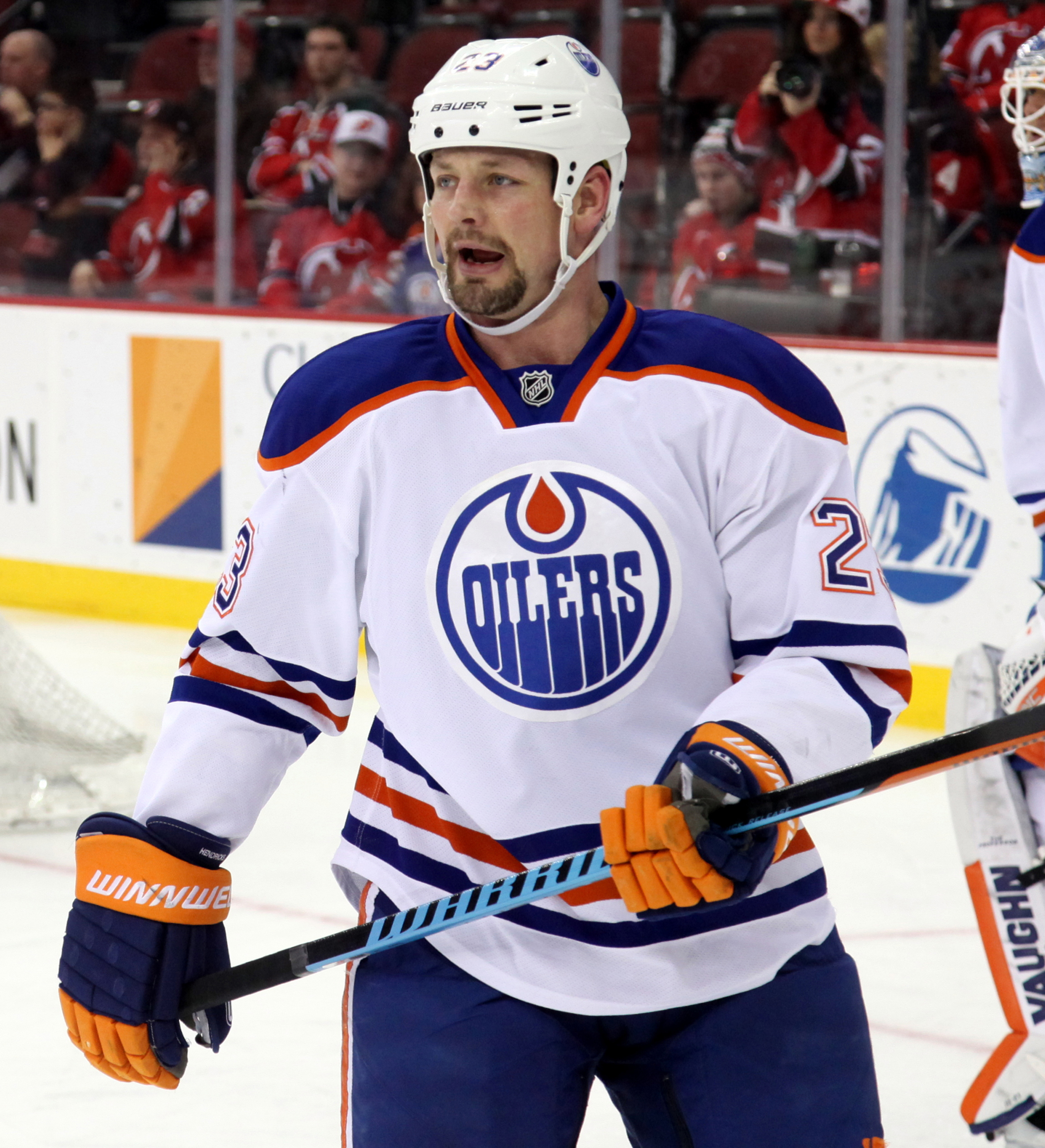
- Hendricks with the Edmonton Oilers in 2015
- Born: June 17, 1981 (age 45) Blaine, Minnesota, U.S.
- Height: 6 ft 0 in (183 cm)
- Weight: 212 lb (96 kg; 15 st 2 lb)
- Position: Left wing
- Shot: Left
- Played for: Colorado Avalanche; Washington Capitals; Nashville Predators; Edmonton Oilers; Winnipeg Jets; Minnesota Wild
- National team: United States
- NHL draft: 131st overall, 2000; Nashville Predators
- Playing career: 2004–2019

Matthew James Hendricks (born June 17, 1981) is an American former professional ice hockey left winger who played in the National Hockey League (NHL) for the Colorado Avalanche, Washington Capitals, Nashville Predators, Edmonton Oilers, Winnipeg Jets and the Minnesota Wild. He was drafted 131st overall by the Predators in 2000, though he didn't play for the organization until signing as a free agent for the 2013–14 season.

He currently serves as the general manager of the Iowa Wild of the American Hockey League.

== Playing career ==
=== Amateur ===
Hendricks was drafted out of high school, 131st overall, in the fourth round of the 2000 NHL entry draft by the Nashville Predators. He played his prep hockey at Blaine High School in Blaine, Minnesota, an integral piece of the Blaine Bengals 2000 Class AA State Championship team where they defeated the Duluth East Greyhounds 6–0 in the final. Hendricks accumulated 110 points in 43 games during his prep career, and was later named a finalist for the 2000 Mr. Hockey Award. The St. Paul Pioneer Press named Hendricks, along with teammates Brandon Bochenski and Matt Moore, to the second team of the All-State Boys hockey team.

Hendricks was drafted by the United States Hockey League (USHL)'s Lincoln Stars during the 2000 USHL Winter Draft, but instead began his collegiate career in the NCAA with St. Cloud State University of the Western Collegiate Hockey Association (WCHA). Hendricks commenced play for the St. Cloud State Huskies as a true freshman during the 2000–01 season. In 2002–03, Hendricks led the Huskies in goals (18) as a junior.

=== Professional ===
Immediately after his senior year with the Huskies, Hendricks made his professional debut with the Nashville Predators' top minor league affiliate, the Milwaukee Admirals of the American Hockey League (AHL), to end the 2003–04 season. After turning down a contract offer with the Predators, Hendricks became a free agent and signed with the Florida Everblades of the ECHL.

During his time with the Everblades in the 2004–05 season, Hendricks also signed a professional try-out agreement with the AHL's Lowell Lock Monsters, appearing in 15 games. He spent the 2005–06 season with the Rochester Americans before moving onto the Hershey Bears for the 2006–07 campaign.

Hendricks enjoyed a successful season in 2006–07, helping Hershey to the Calder Cup Finals, adding 12 points in 19 playoff contests. He was then signed by the Boston Bruins to a two-year contract on the July 9, 2007. He was assigned to Boston's AHL affiliate, the Providence Bruins, where he scored a career-high 52 points in the 2007–08 season.

On June 24, 2008, Hendricks was traded by the Bruins to the Colorado Avalanche in exchange for defenseman Johnny Boychuk. The Avalanche subsequently assigned him to their AHL affiliate, the Lake Erie Monsters, for the 2008–09 season until he was recalled to Colorado on March 9, 2009. He made his NHL debut with the Avalanche the next day, on March 10, 2009, in a 3–0 loss to the Atlanta Thrashers.

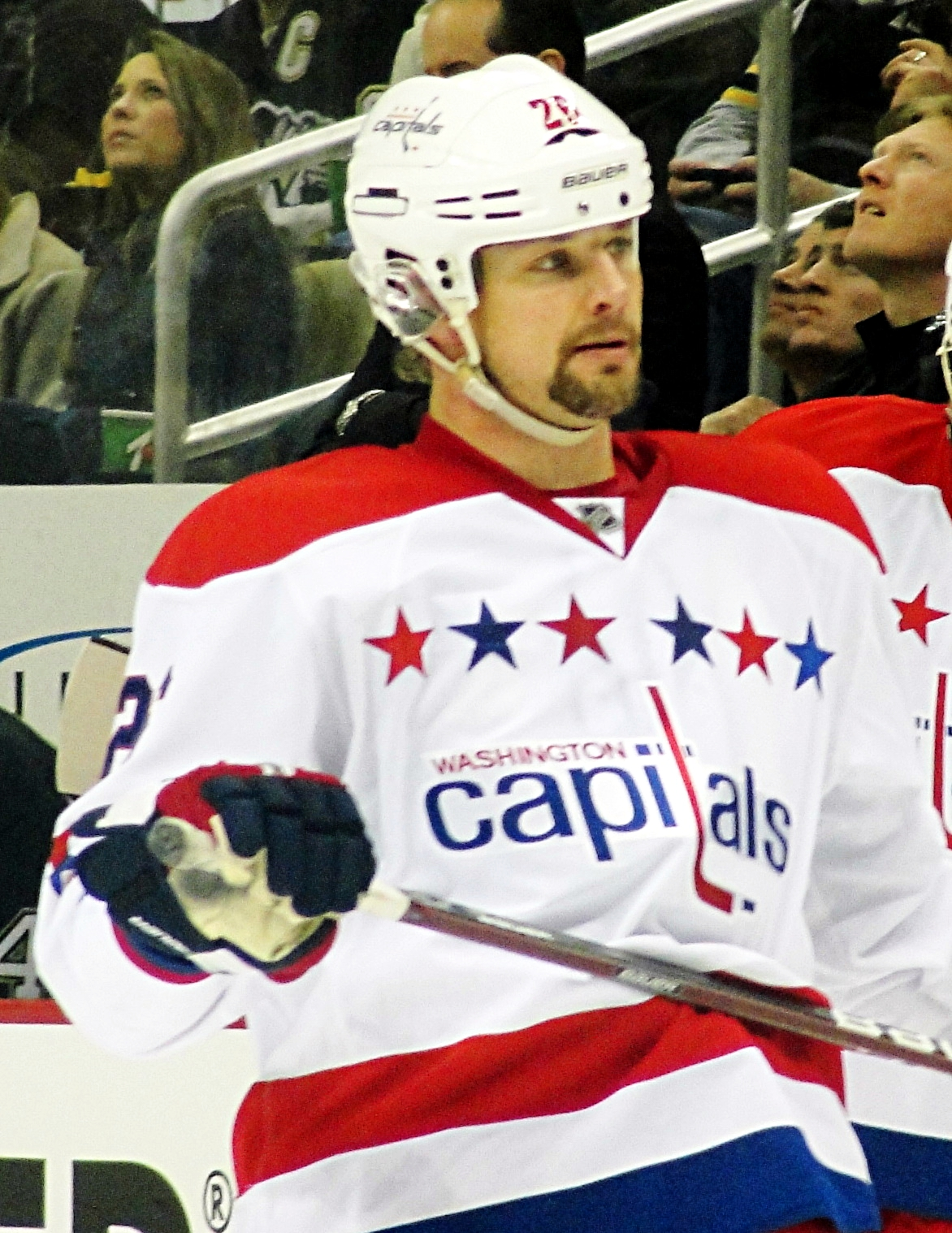
Hendricks with the Capitals in 2012.

For the 2009–10 season, Hendricks made the Avalanche's opening night roster out of the organization's training camp. On October 10, 2009, he scored his first career NHL goal in a 4–3 loss against Cristobal Huet of the Chicago Blackhawks. Hendricks finished his first full NHL season with nine goals and 16 points in 56 games while also earning the Avalanche's nomination for the Bill Masterton Memorial Trophy, awarded annually to the "National Hockey League player who best exemplifies the qualities of perseverance, sportsmanship, and dedication to hockey."

On September 27, 2010, Hendricks signed a one-year contract with the Washington Capitals after attending the team's training camp on a try-out basis. He signed with Washington based on his desire to play under the tutelage of then-Head Coach Bruce Boudreau, with whom he had previously played for with the Hershey Bears in 2006–07. Hendricks made his 2010–11 season debut with the Capitals on October 8, 2010, in a 4–2 defeat to the Atlanta Thrashers. He notched his first point, an assist, with Washington in his third game on October 11, 2010, against the Ottawa Senators. He scored his first goal as a Capital on October 27, 2010, the eventual game-winner, against Cam Ward of the Carolina Hurricanes in a 3–0 win.

On February 23, 2011, Hendricks signed a two-year, $1.65 million contract extension with Washington. Hendricks was a Bill Masterton Memorial Trophy nominee for the second year in a row after the Capitals named him their nominee in April 2011, though he was not one of the three finalists for the award.

Unable to agree on a new contract with the Capitals, Hendricks was signed as a free agent to a four-year contract to return to the organization that originally drafted him, the Nashville Predators, on July 5, 2013.

In the 2013–14 season, Hendricks struggled to meet the expectations of his new contract with the Predators, producing just four points in 44 games at the midpoint of the season. On January 15, 2014, he was traded to the Edmonton Oilers in exchange for goaltender Devan Dubnyk. In his second season with the Oilers, in 2014–15, his first full campaign in Edmonton, Hendricks rebounded offensively with 16 points in 71 games. In adding a veteran presence to the youthful Oilers, Hendricks's work ethic was rewarded in the form of a third nomination for the Masterton Memorial Trophy.

On August 27, 2017, Hendricks signed a one-year, $700,000 contract with the Winnipeg Jets. In the 2017–18 season, Hendricks totalled 8 goals and 13 points in 60 games with the Winnipeg Jets. He ranked second amongst Winnipeg forwards in shorthanded time on ice and ranked fifth on the team in hits. He appeared in 5 playoff games with the Jets, used in a fourth-line role.

Hendricks left the Jets after one season and on July 1, 2018, he signed as a free agent with his hometown team, the Minnesota Wild, on a one-year, $700,000 contract for the 2018–19 season. Hendricks registered 2 assists in the 22 games he was dressed before he was traded back to the Winnipeg Jets at the trade deadline for a 7th round draft pick in 2020.

On June 25, 2019, Hendricks ended his 15-year playing career, accepting a position in player development for the Minnesota Wild.

== International play ==
Medal record

Representing United States

Ice hockey

World Championships
| Bronze medal – third place | 2015 Czech Republic | |

At completion of the 2014–15 season with the Oilers, at the age of 33, Hendricks was selected to play in his first international tournament after earning a place on Team USA for the 2015 World Championships in Prague, Czech Republic. As a veteran presence on the American squad, he was announced as team captain on eve of the tournament. In the opening game of the Championships, on May 1, 2015, Hendricks marked his international debut against Finland by scoring two goals in a 5–1 victory. Hendricks would lead Team USA to claim top position after the round robin stage and finished the Tournament with 3 points in 10 games, to help claim a Bronze medal against host country the Czech Republic on May 17, 2015.

== Personal life ==
Hendricks grew up in Blaine, Minnesota, son to an American Marine and a Swedish mother. In his spare time he enjoys playing golf.

Hendricks and his wife Kimberly have twins, a boy and a girl, born November 10, 2011.

== Career statistics ==
=== Regular season and playoffs ===
| | | | Regular season | | | | | Playoffs |
| Season | Team | League | GP | G | A | Pts | PIM | GP | G | A | Pts | PIM |
|---|---|---|---|---|---|---|---|---|---|---|---|---|
| 1998–99 | Blaine High School | HS-MN | 22 | 23 | 34 | 57 | 42 | — | — | — | — | — |
| 1999–2000 | Blaine High School | HS-MN | 21 | 23 | 30 | 53 | 28 | — | — | — | — | — |
| 2000–01 | St. Cloud State University | WCHA | 36 | 3 | 9 | 12 | 23 | — | — | — | — | — |
| 2001–02 | St. Cloud State University | WCHA | 42 | 19 | 20 | 39 | 74 | — | — | — | — | — |
| 2002–03 | St. Cloud State University | WCHA | 37 | 18 | 18 | 36 | 64 | — | — | — | — | — |
| 2003–04 | St. Cloud State University | WCHA | 37 | 14 | 11 | 25 | 32 | — | — | — | — | — |
| 2003–04 | Milwaukee Admirals | AHL | 1 | 0 | 0 | 0 | 2 | — | — | — | — | — |
| 2004–05 | Florida Everblades | ECHL | 54 | 24 | 26 | 50 | 94 | 4 | 0 | 0 | 0 | 4 |
| 2004–05 | Lowell Lock Monsters | AHL | 15 | 1 | 2 | 3 | 10 | — | — | — | — | — |
| 2005–06 | Rochester Americans | AHL | 56 | 13 | 14 | 27 | 84 | — | — | — | — | — |
| 2006–07 | Hershey Bears | AHL | 65 | 18 | 26 | 44 | 105 | 19 | 8 | 4 | 12 | 18 |
| 2007–08 | Providence Bruins | AHL | 67 | 22 | 30 | 52 | 121 | 10 | 0 | 3 | 3 | 6 |
| 2008–09 | Lake Erie Monsters | AHL | 43 | 14 | 15 | 29 | 71 | — | — | — | — | — |
| 2008–09 | Colorado Avalanche | NHL | 4 | 0 | 0 | 0 | 13 | — | — | — | — | — |
| 2009–10 | Colorado Avalanche | NHL | 56 | 9 | 7 | 16 | 74 | 6 | 0 | 0 | 0 | 0 |
| 2010–11 | Washington Capitals | NHL | 77 | 9 | 16 | 25 | 110 | 7 | 0 | 0 | 0 | 4 |
| 2011–12 | Washington Capitals | NHL | 78 | 4 | 5 | 9 | 95 | 14 | 1 | 1 | 2 | 6 |
| 2012–13 | Washington Capitals | NHL | 48 | 5 | 3 | 8 | 73 | 7 | 0 | 0 | 0 | 0 |
| 2013–14 | Nashville Predators | NHL | 44 | 2 | 2 | 4 | 54 | — | — | — | — | — |
| 2013–14 | Edmonton Oilers | NHL | 33 | 3 | 0 | 3 | 58 | — | — | — | — | — |
| 2014–15 | Edmonton Oilers | NHL | 71 | 8 | 8 | 16 | 76 | — | — | — | — | — |
| 2015–16 | Edmonton Oilers | NHL | 68 | 5 | 7 | 12 | 82 | — | — | — | — | — |
| 2016–17 | Edmonton Oilers | NHL | 42 | 3 | 4 | 7 | 29 | — | — | — | — | — |
| 2017–18 | Winnipeg Jets | NHL | 60 | 5 | 8 | 13 | 39 | 5 | 0 | 0 | 0 | 4 |
| 2018–19 | Minnesota Wild | NHL | 22 | 0 | 2 | 2 | 19 | — | — | — | — | — |
| 2018–19 | Winnipeg Jets | NHL | 4 | 0 | 1 | 1 | 0 | — | — | — | — | — |
| NHL totals | | | 607 | 54 | 62 | 116 | 722 | 39 | 1 | 1 | 2 | 14 |

=== International ===
| Year | Team | Event | Result | GP | G | A | Pts | PIM |
|---|---|---|---|---|---|---|---|---|
| 2015 | United States | WC | 3rd place, bronze medalist(s) | 10 | 2 | 1 | 3 | 18 |
| 2016 | United States | WC | 4th | 10 | 0 | 1 | 1 | 6 |
| Senior totals | | | | 20 | 2 | 2 | 4 | 24 |
