= Jeff Norton =

American ice hockey player (born 1965)

- Born: November 25, 1965 (age 60) Acton, Massachusetts, U.S.
- Height: 6 ft 2 in (188 cm)
- Weight: 200 lb (91 kg; 14 st 4 lb)
- Position: Defense
- Shot: Left
- Played for: New York Islanders; San Jose Sharks; St. Louis Blues; Edmonton Oilers; Tampa Bay Lightning; Florida Panthers; Pittsburgh Penguins; Boston Bruins; Frisk Tigers
- National team: United States
- NHL draft: 62nd overall, 1984; New York Islanders
- Playing career: 1987–2002

Jeffrey Thomas Norton (born November 25, 1965) is an American former professional ice hockey defenseman who played 15 seasons in the National Hockey League (NHL).

== Playing career ==
Norton was selected in the 1984 NHL entry draft by the New York Islanders. Norton played for Team USA Hockey in the 1988 Winter Olympics in Calgary, Alberta. Norton has also played for the San Jose Sharks (three separate times), St. Louis Blues, Edmonton Oilers, Tampa Bay Lightning, Florida Panthers (two separate times), Pittsburgh Penguins, and Boston Bruins.

== PPG Paints Arena statue ==
Norton and Rich Pilon are depicted as the two defenders Mario Lemieux skates between in a 4,700-pound bronze statue unveiled on March 7, 2012, at PPG Paints Arena (then called Consol Energy Center) in Pittsburgh, Pennsylvania.

== Personal life ==
A graduate of the University of Michigan, he grew up in the town of Acton, Massachusetts and attended Cushing Academy. His younger brother, Brad, also played hockey in the NHL.

== Career statistics ==
=== Regular season and playoffs ===
			Regular season					Playoffs
Season	Team	League	GP	G	A	Pts	PIM	GP	G	A	Pts	PIM
1981–82	Acton-Boxborough Regional High School	HSMA	—	—	—	—	—	—	—	—	—	—
1982–83	Cushing Academy	HS-Prep	—	—	—	—	—	—	—	—	—	—
1983–84	Cushing Academy	HS-Prep	21	22	33	55	20	—	—	—	—	—
1984–85	University of Michigan	CCHA	37	8	16	24	103	—	—	—	—	—
1985–86	University of Michigan	CCHA	37	15	30	45	99	—	—	—	—	—
1986–87	University of Michigan	CCHA	39	12	36	48	92	—	—	—	—	—
1987–88	New York Islanders	NHL	15	1	6	7	14	3	0	2	2	13
1988–89	New York Islanders	NHL	69	1	30	31	74	—	—	—	—	—
1989–90	New York Islanders	NHL	60	4	49	53	65	4	1	3	4	17
1990–91	New York Islanders	NHL	44	3	25	28	16	—	—	—	—	—
1991–92	New York Islanders	NHL	28	1	18	19	18	—	—	—	—	—
1992–93	New York Islanders	NHL	66	12	38	50	45	10	1	1	2	4
1993–94	San Jose Sharks	NHL	64	7	33	40	36	14	1	5	6	20
1994–95	San Jose Sharks	NHL	20	1	9	10	39	—	—	—	—	—
1994–95	St. Louis Blues	NHL	28	2	18	20	33	7	1	1	2	11
1995–96	St. Louis Blues	NHL	36	4	7	11	26	—	—	—	—	—
1995–96	Edmonton Oilers	NHL	30	4	16	20	16	—	—	—	—	—
1996–97	Edmonton Oilers	NHL	62	2	11	13	42	—	—	—	—	—
1996–97	Tampa Bay Lightning	NHL	13	0	5	5	16	—	—	—	—	—
1997–98	Tampa Bay Lightning	NHL	37	4	6	10	26	—	—	—	—	—
1997–98	Florida Panthers	NHL	19	0	7	7	18	—	—	—	—	—
1998–99	Florida Panthers	NHL	3	0	0	0	2	—	—	—	—	—
1998–99	San Jose Sharks	NHL	69	4	18	22	42	6	0	7	7	10
1999–2000	San Jose Sharks	NHL	62	0	20	20	49	12	0	1	1	7
2000–01	Pittsburgh Penguins	NHL	32	2	10	12	20	—	—	—	—	—
2000–01	San Jose Sharks	NHL	10	0	1	1	8	6	0	1	1	2
2001–02	Florida Panthers	NHL	29	0	4	4	8	—	—	—	—	—
2001–02	Boston Bruins	NHL	3	0	1	1	2	3	0	0	0	5
2002–03	Frisk Asker	NOR	33	3	16	19	42	—	—	—	—	—
NHL totals			799	52	332	384	615	65	4	21	25	89

=== International ===
Year	Team	Event	Result	GP	G	A	Pts	PIM
1988	United States	OG	7th	6	0	4	4	4
1989	United States	WC	6th	6	1	0	1	4
1990	United States	WC	5th	10	4	1	5	14
Senior totals				22	5	5	10	22

== Awards and honours ==
Award	Year
College
All-CCHA Second Team	1987

== Transactions ==
- June 20, 1993 – Traded from the New York Islanders to the San Jose Sharks for a 1994 third-round pick.
- March 6, 1995 – Traded from the San Jose Sharks with conditional pick in the 1997 draft to the St. Louis Blues for Craig Janney and cash.
- January 4, 1996 – Traded from the St. Louis Blues with Donald Dufresne to the Edmonton Oilers for Igor Kravchuk and Ken Sutton.
- March 18, 1997 – Traded from the Edmonton Oilers to the Tampa Bay Lightning for Drew Bannister and a 1997 sixth-round pick (#141 – Peter Sarno).
- January 16, 1998 – Traded from the Tampa Bay Lightning with Dino Ciccarelli to the Florida Panthers for Mark Fitzpatrick and Jody Hull.
- November 11, 1998 – Traded from the Florida Panthers to the San Jose Sharks for Alex Hicks and a 1999 fifth-round pick (#140 – Adam Johnson).
- March 19, 2002 – Traded from the Florida Panthers to the Boston Bruins for a 2002 sixth-round pick (#196 – Mikael Vuorio).
