= Mike Grier =

American ice hockey player (born 1975)

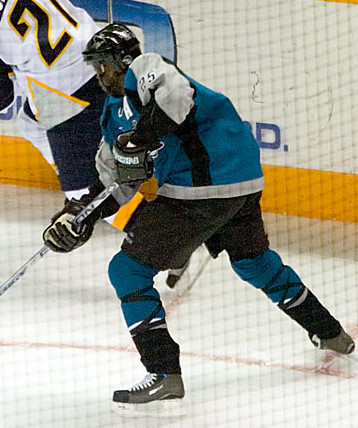
- Grier with the San Jose Sharks in 2007
- Born: January 5, 1975 (age 51) Detroit, Michigan, U.S.
- Height: 6 ft 1 in (185 cm)
- Weight: 227 lb (103 kg; 16 st 3 lb)
- Position: Right wing
- Shot: Right
- Played for: Edmonton Oilers; Washington Capitals; Buffalo Sabres; San Jose Sharks
- National team: United States
- NHL draft: 219th overall, 1993; St. Louis Blues
- Playing career: 1996–2011

Michael James Grier (born January 5, 1975) is an American former professional ice hockey winger and current general manager of the San Jose Sharks in the National Hockey League (NHL). He played for the Edmonton Oilers, Washington Capitals, Buffalo Sabres, and San Jose Sharks. Primarily a checking forward, he played 1,060 games over 14 seasons. He was the first African-American NHL player to train exclusively in the United States, and the league's first black general manager.

== Early years ==
Grier's father Bobby was the associate director of pro scouting for the Houston Texans of the National Football League (NFL). Prior to that, Bobby Grier was a running backs coach, director of pro scouting, and vice-president of player personnel for the New England Patriots of the NFL. (The elder Grier (born 1942) should not be confused with the Bobby Grier (born 1933) who broke the color barrier in the 1956 Sugar Bowl.) Grier's brother Chris served as the general manager for the Miami Dolphins, a position he held starting in 2016. Another notable athlete in the family is Pro Bowl NFL defensive lineman Roosevelt "Rosey" Grier.

Grier was raised in Holliston, Massachusetts, where he attended and played hockey at St. Sebastian's School. He is of Bajan descent.

== Playing career ==
Grier was originally drafted by the St. Louis Blues in the ninth round (219th overall) of the 1993 NHL entry draft, and was considered a long-shot to make an NHL team. He spent his early playing days with Saint Sebastian's School and later with Boston University, culminating in his best amateur season in 1994–95, where he was named a first team all-star. During his time at BU, Grier's NHL rights were dealt to the Edmonton Oilers along with star goaltender Curtis Joseph in exchange for a pair of first round picks.

After leaving college, Grier immediately cracked the Oilers lineup as a checking-line right-winger, scoring 32 points and bearing a respectable +7 plus-minus rating. During his time in Edmonton, Grier was best known for provoking Chris Simon of the Washington Capitals in 1997. Grier allegedly made derogatory comments about Simon's Ojibwa heritage, and Simon allegedly responded with a racial slur directed at Grier. Although the spoken words were never confirmed, Simon was suspended for three games as a result of the incident. Grier played six seasons with the Oilers organization, including two in which he scored twenty goals.

On October 2, 2002, in order to free up roster space, Grier was traded to the Washington Capitals for a pair of draft choices. Incidentally, this put Grier and Simon on the same team for a short time. Simon was traded to Chicago after playing 10 games in the 2002–03 season. The Capitals attempted to put a Stanley Cup-caliber team together, primarily built around star forward Jaromír Jágr and goaltender Olaf Kölzig. The team disappointed on the ice, although Grier remained a reliable checking player.

This did not last long, as Washington traded Grier on March 4, 2004, to the Buffalo Sabres for Czech prospect Jakub Klepiš. Grier finished the season with Buffalo, scoring nine points, but the Sabres failed to make the playoffs. During the 2005–06 NHL season, Grier set a personal record, scoring four game-winning goals for the Sabres and contributing to their run to the 2006 Eastern Conference Finals. Grier was then signed to a free agent deal by the San Jose Sharks, where he recorded 16 goals, including three shorthanded, in his first season with San Jose. He scored nine and 10 goals in his next two seasons with the Sharks, respectively.

On August 10, 2009, Grier returned to the Buffalo Sabres as a free agent.

Grier's biggest contribution to the Sharks and Sabres was his penalty-killing ability. San Jose ranked 14th, 1st, and 4th in penalty killing in the three years he played there. In the 2009–10 season, Buffalo was second overall in the NHL in penalty killing. He was in the top penalty-killing units of both teams.

Grier played his 1,000th NHL game on November 3, 2010, against the Boston Bruins, becoming the 254th player in NHL history to reach the milestone. After not being re-signed by Buffalo for the 2011–12 season, Grier announced his retirement from the NHL on December 1, 2011.

== Post-playing career ==
=== Early roles ===
After retiring, Grier served as a scout with the Chicago Blackhawks and an assistant coach with the New Jersey Devils before he was hired by the New York Rangers as hockey operations advisor on May 19, 2021.

Grier also coached at Saint Sebastian's School, where he played his high school hockey. He also coached his son's Boston Jr. Terriers 03 AAA team.

=== San Jose Sharks general manager (2022–present) ===
On July 5, 2022, Grier became the general manager of the San Jose Sharks. This move made him the first black general manager in NHL history.

== Awards and honors ==
Medal record

Representing United States

Ice hockey

World Championships
Bronze medal – third place	2004 Prague	

Award	Year
All-Hockey East All-Star	1994–95
AHCA East First-Team All-American	1994–95

== Career statistics ==
=== Regular season and playoffs ===
			Regular season					Playoffs
Season	Team	League	GP	G	A	Pts	PIM	GP	G	A	Pts	PIM
1992–93	St. Sebastian's School	ISL	22	16	27	43	32	—	—	—	—	—
1993–94	Boston University	HE	39	9	9	18	58	—	—	—	—	—
1994–95	Boston University	HE	37	29	26	55	85	—	—	—	—	—
1995–96	Boston University	HE	38	21	26	47	82	—	—	—	—	—
1996–97	Edmonton Oilers	NHL	79	15	17	32	45	12	3	1	4	4
1997–98	Edmonton Oilers	NHL	66	9	6	15	73	12	2	2	4	13
1998–99	Edmonton Oilers	NHL	82	20	24	44	54	4	1	1	2	6
1999–2000	Edmonton Oilers	NHL	65	9	22	31	68	—	—	—	—	—
2000–01	Edmonton Oilers	NHL	74	20	16	36	20	6	0	0	0	8
2001–02	Edmonton Oilers	NHL	82	8	17	25	32	—	—	—	—	—
2002–03	Washington Capitals	NHL	82	15	17	32	36	6	1	1	2	2
2003–04	Washington Capitals	NHL	68	8	12	20	32	—	—	—	—	—
2003–04	Buffalo Sabres	NHL	14	1	8	9	4	—	—	—	—	—
2005–06	Buffalo Sabres	NHL	81	7	16	23	28	18	3	5	8	2
2006–07	San Jose Sharks	NHL	81	16	17	33	43	11	2	2	4	27
2007–08	San Jose Sharks	NHL	78	9	13	22	24	13	0	1	1	2
2008–09	San Jose Sharks	NHL	62	10	13	23	25	6	0	0	0	6
2009–10	Buffalo Sabres	NHL	73	10	12	22	14	6	2	0	2	2
2010–11	Buffalo Sabres	NHL	73	5	11	16	12	7	0	1	1	0
NHL totals			1,060	162	221	383	510	101	14	14	28	72

=== International ===
Year	Team	Event	GP	G	A	Pts	PIM
1995	United States	WJC	7	0	2	2	12
2004	United States	WC	9	1	2	3	8
Junior totals			7	0	2	2	12
Senior totals			9	1	2	3	8

== See also ==
- Black players in ice hockey
- List of NHL players with 1,000 games played
