= Kelly Buchberger =

Canadian ice hockey player, coach (born 1966)

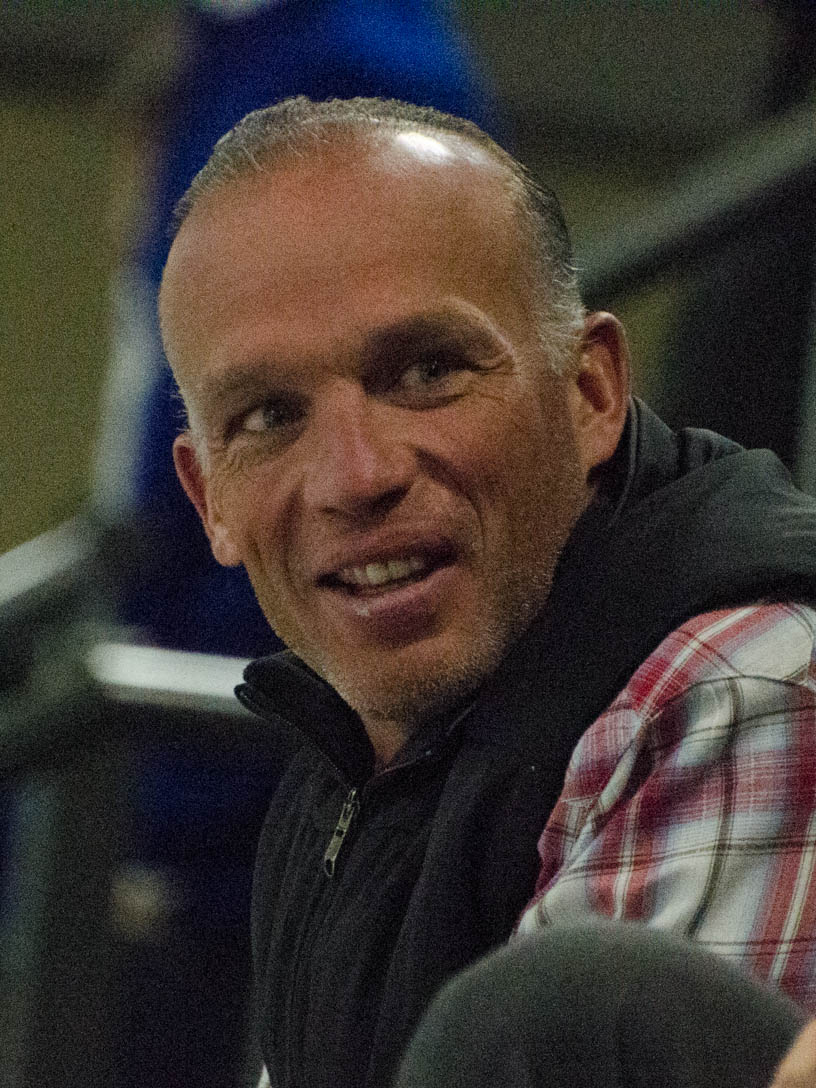
- Buchberger in 2014
- Born: December 2, 1966 (age 59) Langenburg, Saskatchewan, Canada
- Height: 6 ft 2 in (188 cm)
- Weight: 210 lb (95 kg; 15 st 0 lb)
- Position: Right wing
- Shot: Left
- Played for: Edmonton Oilers; Atlanta Thrashers; Los Angeles Kings; Phoenix Coyotes; Pittsburgh Penguins
- National team: Canada
- NHL draft: 188th overall, 1985; Edmonton Oilers
- Playing career: 1986–2004
Medal record
Representing Canada
Ice hockey
World Championships
Gold medal – first place	1994 Italy
Silver medal – second place	1996 Austria

Kelly Michael Buchberger (born December 2, 1966) is a Canadian professional ice hockey coach and former player. He played for several National Hockey League (NHL) teams from 1986 to 2004. As a coach, he has been an assistant for the New York Islanders of the NHL and a head coach of the Tri City Americans of the Western Hockey League (WHL).

== Playing career ==
Buchberger has played for the Edmonton Oilers, Atlanta Thrashers, Los Angeles Kings, Phoenix Coyotes, and the Pittsburgh Penguins. He also played minor hockey with the Western Hockey League Moose Jaw Warriors and pro hockey with the American Hockey League (AHL) Nova Scotia Oilers.

He was drafted in the ninth round by the Edmonton Oilers in the 1985 NHL entry draft, making him the 188th overall pick. He made his NHL debut in 1987 Stanley Cup finals. During his playing career, he was known best for his gritty play and leadership, having captained the Oilers for four years as the team's 9th leader in franchise history. He won the Stanley Cup twice with Edmonton, in 1987 and 1990.

Buchberger was the last remaining active member of the Oilers' roster to have been on one of their five Stanley Cup-winning teams, along with Marty McSorley. He remained with the Oilers until 1999, when he was selected by the Atlanta Thrashers in the 1999 NHL Expansion Draft.

== Coaching career ==
After retiring, Buchberger was an assistant coach with the AHL Edmonton Road Runners team in 2004–05. He then joined the Oilers management as a development coach. On August 3, 2007, he was named head coach of the Oilers' American Hockey League affiliate, the Springfield Falcons, and guided the team to a 35–35–10 record, the team's first .500 season since 1998–99. Buchberger then was promoted to the Edmonton Oilers during the 2008 offseason, becoming an assistant coach with them. On June 10, 2014, he was reassigned to the role of player personnel and replaced as assistant coach by Craig Ramsay.

On July 11, 2017, Buchberger was hired as the assistant coach by the New York Islanders. In 2018, he was named the head coach of the Tri-City Americans in the Western Hockey League. In 2021, his contract with the Americans was not renewed.

Buchberger was hired as the first general manager and head coach of the Devon Xtreme, a junior ice hockey expansion franchise to debut in the Alberta Junior Hockey League in the 2024–25 season.

== Career statistics ==
=== Regular season and playoffs ===
			Regular season					Playoffs
Season	Team	League	GP	G	A	Pts	PIM	GP	G	A	Pts	PIM
1983–84	Melville Millionaires	SJHL	60	14	11	25	139	—	—	—	—	—
1984–85	Moose Jaw Warriors	WHL	51	12	17	29	114	—	—	—	—	—
1985–86	Moose Jaw Warriors	WHL	72	14	22	36	206	13	11	4	15	37
1986–87	Nova Scotia Oilers	AHL	70	12	20	32	257	5	0	1	1	23
1986–87	Edmonton Oilers	NHL	—	—	—	—	—	3	0	0	0	5
1987–88	Nova Scotia Oilers	AHL	49	21	23	44	206	2	0	0	0	11
1987–88	Edmonton Oilers	NHL	19	1	0	1	81	—	—	—	—	—
1988–89	Edmonton Oilers	NHL	66	5	9	14	234	—	—	—	—	—
1989–90	Edmonton Oilers	NHL	55	2	6	8	168	19	0	5	5	13
1990–91	Edmonton Oilers	NHL	64	3	1	4	160	12	2	1	3	25
1991–92	Edmonton Oilers	NHL	79	20	24	44	157	16	1	4	5	32
1992–93	Edmonton Oilers	NHL	83	12	18	30	133	—	—	—	—	—
1993–94	Edmonton Oilers	NHL	84	3	18	21	199	—	—	—	—	—
1994–95	Edmonton Oilers	NHL	48	7	17	24	82	—	—	—	—	—
1995–96	Edmonton Oilers	NHL	82	11	14	25	184	—	—	—	—	—
1996–97	Edmonton Oilers	NHL	81	8	30	38	159	12	5	2	7	16
1997–98	Edmonton Oilers	NHL	82	6	17	23	122	12	1	2	3	25
1998–99	Edmonton Oilers	NHL	52	4	4	8	68	4	0	0	0	0
1999–00	Atlanta Thrashers	NHL	68	5	12	17	139	—	—	—	—	—
1999–00	Los Angeles Kings	NHL	13	2	1	3	13	4	0	0	0	4
2000–01	Los Angeles Kings	NHL	82	6	14	20	75	8	1	0	1	2
2001–02	Los Angeles Kings	NHL	74	6	7	13	105	7	0	0	0	7
2002–03	Phoenix Coyotes	NHL	79	3	9	12	109	—	—	—	—	—
2003–04	Pittsburgh Penguins	NHL	71	1	3	4	109	—	—	—	—	—
2005–06	Bentley Generals	ChHL	9	4	6	10	12	—	—	—	—	—
NHL totals			1,182	105	204	309	2,297	97	10	14	24	129

=== International ===
Year	Team	Event	Result	GP	G	A	Pts	PIM
1993	Canada	WC	4th	8	0	2	2	6
1994	Canada	WC	1st place, gold medalist(s)	8	0	0	0	8
1996	Canada	WC	2nd place, silver medalist(s)	4	0	0	0	6
Senior totals				20	0	2	2	22

== Coaching record ==
Team	Year	Regular season							Post season
Team	Year	G	W	L	OTL	SOL	Pts	Finish	Result
SPR	2007–08	80	35	35	5	5	80	5th in Atlantic	Missed playoffs
TC	2018–19	68	34	28	5	1	74	4th in U.S.	Lost in first round
TC	2019–20	63	17	40	4	2	40	5th in U.S.	no playoffs (Note: Due to the COVID-19 pandemic in North America the nearly complete 2019–20 WHL regular season was cancelled, and no playoffs were held.)
TC	2020–21	19	7	12	0	0	14	no standings (Note: The 2020–21 WHL regular season was shortened, started late, then was cancelled early, and no playoffs were held, due to the ongoing COVID-19 pandemic. The Tri City Americans were in a mathematical position to finish anywhere from 3rd to 5th in the U.S. Division when the season was cancelled.)	no playoffs

== Awards and honours ==
Award	Year
NHL
Stanley Cup (Edmonton Oilers)	1987, 1990

== See also ==
- List of NHL players with 1,000 games played
- List of NHL players with 2,000 career penalty minutes

Sporting positions
Preceded by Winnipeg Jets captains Kris King	Atlanta Thrashers captain 1999–2000	Succeeded by Steve Staios
Preceded by Shayne Corson	Edmonton Oilers captain 1995–1999	Succeeded by Doug Weight
