= Todd Marchant =

American ice hockey player (born 1973)

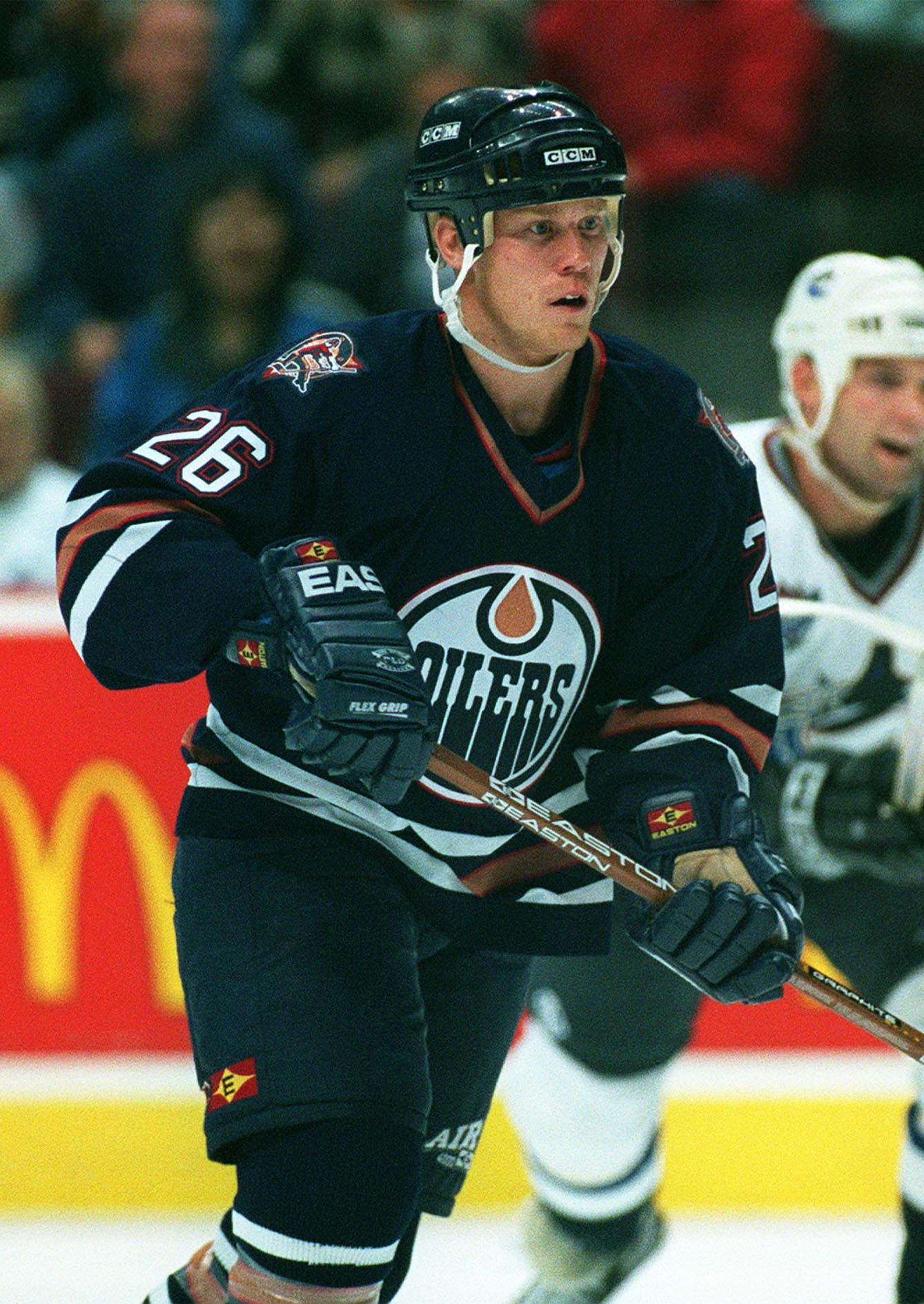
- Marchant with the Edmonton Oilers in 1997
- Born: August 12, 1973 (age 52) Buffalo, New York, U.S.
- Height: 5 ft 10 in (178 cm)
- Weight: 180 lb (82 kg; 12 st 12 lb)
- Position: Center
- Shot: Left
- Played for: New York Rangers; Edmonton Oilers; Columbus Blue Jackets; Anaheim Ducks
- National team: United States
- NHL draft: 164th overall, 1993; New York Rangers
- Playing career: 1993–2011

Todd Michael Marchant (born August 12, 1973) is an American former professional ice hockey player who played 17 seasons in the National Hockey League (NHL). He played nine seasons with the Edmonton Oilers and almost six seasons with the Anaheim Ducks, along with just over a season with the Columbus Blue Jackets and a game with the New York Rangers. He also played 49 games in the American Hockey League (AHL) between his time with the Binghamton Rangers and Cape Breton Oilers. He is now serving as the Director of Player Development for the San Jose Sharks.

== Career ==
=== Early career ===
Marchant played high school hockey and baseball at Williamsville East High School. He then played two years in the NCAA with Clarkson University, from 1991–1993. He was drafted by the Rangers in the 1993 NHL entry draft in the seventh round, 164th overall. In 1993–94, his first pro season, he played games with the Rangers, their AHL affiliate in Binghamton. He was acquired by the Oilers in a trade for Craig MacTavish and continued play with their affiliate in Cape Breton (and in his last couple of seasons with the Oilers, had the distinction of being one of the few NHL players to be coached by an ex-player for whom he was once traded).

=== Edmonton Oilers ===
Marchant played nine full seasons as an Oiler (1994–2003), serving as an alternate captain for his last few seasons in Edmonton. He was known as one of the fastest players in the NHL, and used his speed mostly in a defensive capacity. He scored the first round game seven overtime goal that eliminated the Dallas Stars from the 1997 playoffs, taking a pass from alternate captain Doug Weight and speeding by a stumbling Grant Ledyard to score on Andy Moog. Marchant would go on to lead all players in shorthanded goals in the 1997 playoffs, with 3. In doing so, he became the first player in 8 years to score 3 shorthanded goals in the playoffs. The last player to do it was Chicago Blackhawks forward Wayne Presley in 1989.

=== Columbus Blue Jackets ===
In the summer of 2003, Marchant was signed by the Blue Jackets after he gained early unrestricted free agency from the Oilers. He played the full 2003–04 season with Columbus, along with fellow ex-Oilers Tyler Wright and Luke Richardson.

Marchant then refused to waive his no-trade clause, which would have allowed Columbus to send him to Anaheim as part of the Sergei Fedorov trade. After trading for Fedorov, Columbus placed Marchant on waivers in order to circumvent his no-trade clause. Anaheim picked Marchant up on waivers on November 21, 2005 to make him a Mighty Duck.

=== Anaheim Ducks ===
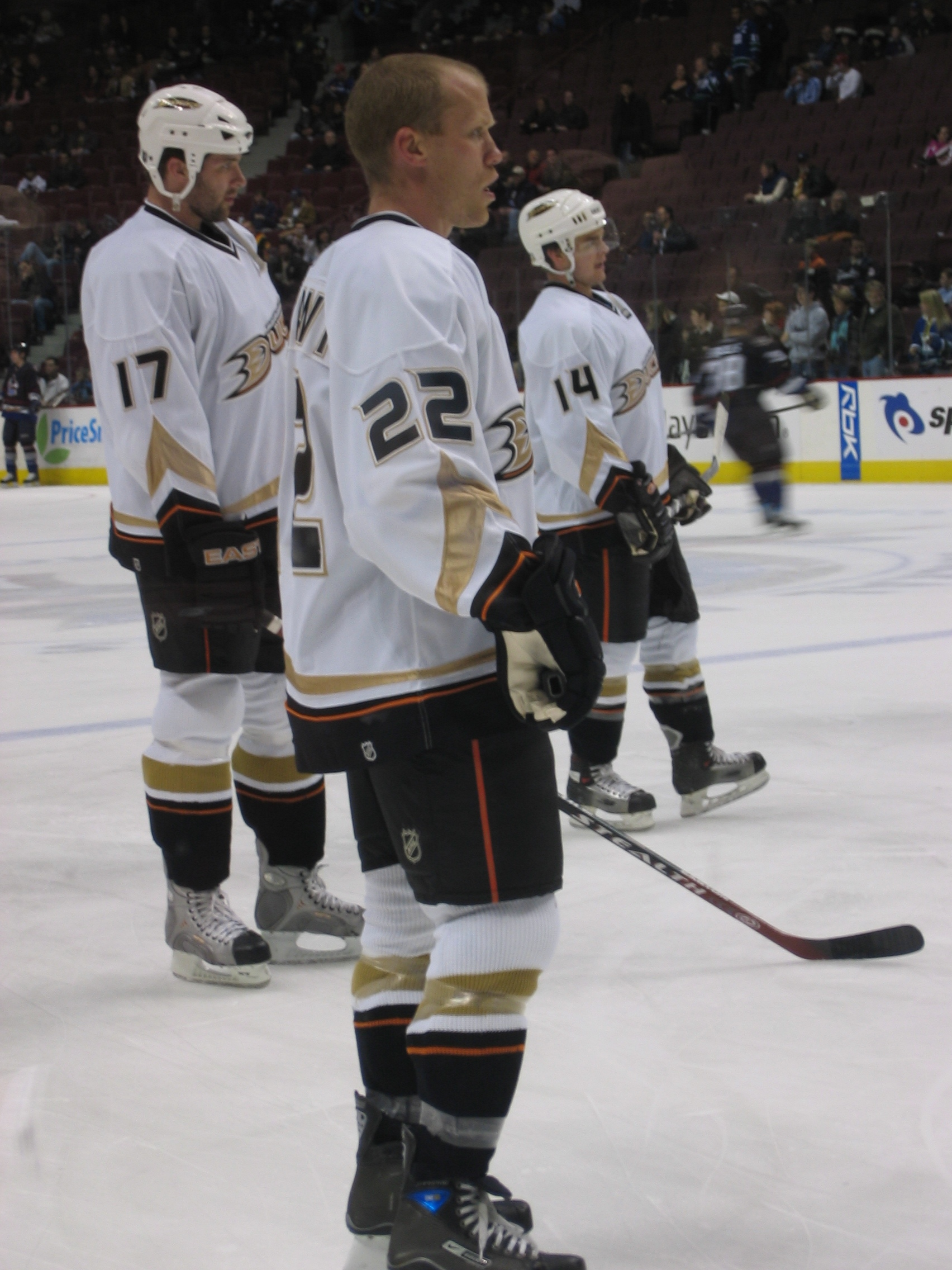
Marchant in 2006

Marchant played with the Mighty Ducks in the last half of the 2005–06 NHL Season. Marchant and the Ducks advanced all the way to the Western Conference Finals but were eliminated by Marchant's former team, the Edmonton Oilers.

He returned to the roster of the newly named Anaheim Ducks for the 2006–07 NHL season. The season began as a record-breaking year, with the Ducks setting franchise records and also setting a league-wide record for the longest streak of being undefeated in regulation at the beginning of the season.

Marchant was injured halfway through the year, missing over 20 games. He did not return to play in good condition until the Ducks were midway through the 2007 NHL Playoffs. Marchant returned in the series against the Detroit Red Wings in the Conference Final, and played a vital role in killing penalties. Marchant went on to win his first Stanley Cup when the Ducks defeated the Ottawa Senators in the 2007 Stanley Cup Final.

The Ducks were eliminated in the first round of the 2008 Stanley Cup Playoffs by the Dallas Stars, a series in which Marchant scored twice. He contributed 5 goals during the 2008-09 NHL Season as the Ducks entered the playoffs as the last seed and upset the first seed San Jose Sharks. Marchant scored the game-winning goal in triple overtime in game two of the Ducks second round series with the Detroit Red Wings, a series Detroit would ultimately win in seven games.

=== Front Office ===
Marchant announced his retirement after 17 seasons in the NHL on June 29, 2011. He stayed with the Ducks in a front office capacity as the Director of Player Development and as an assistant coach for the Anaheim Jr. Ducks Mite A club. In May of 2022, he was fired from his NHL front office duties following the resignation of former GM Bob Murray.

In August of 2022, he was hired by the San Jose Sharks as their Director of Player Development.

== Personal life ==
Todd and wife Caroline Marchant have four children; daughters Lillian and Ashley & sons Timothy Todd and Bradley David, who was born on April 20, 2009. He also hosts a weeklong hockey clinic for kids ages 8 to 15 during the offseason at the Amherst Pepsi Center. 100% of profits from his school go to charities for disadvantaged youth around Western New York.

== Career statistics ==
=== Regular season and playoffs ===
			Regular season					Playoffs
Season	Team	League	GP	G	A	Pts	PIM	GP	G	A	Pts	PIM
1990–91	Niagara Scenic	NAHL	37	31	47	78		—	—	—	—	—
1991–92	Clarkson University	ECAC	33	20	12	32	32	—	—	—	—	—
1992–93	Clarkson University	ECAC	33	18	28	46	38	—	—	—	—	—
1993–94	United States	Intl	59	28	39	67	48	—	—	—	—	—
1993–94	New York Rangers	NHL	1	0	0	0	0	—	—	—	—	—
1993–94	Binghamton Rangers	AHL	8	2	7	9	6	—	—	—	—	—
1993–94	Edmonton Oilers	NHL	3	0	1	1	2	—	—	—	—	—
1993–94	Cape Breton Oilers	AHL	3	1	4	5	2	5	1	1	2	0
1994–95	Cape Breton Oilers	AHL	38	22	25	47	25	—	—	—	—	—
1994–95	Edmonton Oilers	NHL	45	13	14	27	32	—	—	—	—	—
1995–96	Edmonton Oilers	NHL	81	19	19	38	66	—	—	—	—	—
1996–97	Edmonton Oilers	NHL	79	14	19	33	44	12	4	2	6	12
1997–98	Edmonton Oilers	NHL	76	14	21	35	71	12	1	1	2	10
1998–99	Edmonton Oilers	NHL	82	14	22	36	65	4	1	1	2	12
1999–2000	Edmonton Oilers	NHL	82	17	23	40	70	3	1	0	1	2
2000–01	Edmonton Oilers	NHL	71	13	26	39	51	6	0	0	0	4
2001–02	Edmonton Oilers	NHL	82	12	22	34	41	—	—	—	—	—
2002–03	Edmonton Oilers	NHL	77	20	40	60	48	6	0	2	2	2
2003–04	Columbus Blue Jackets	NHL	77	9	25	34	34	—	—	—	—	—
2005–06	Columbus Blue Jackets	NHL	18	3	6	9	20	—	—	—	—	—
2005–06	Mighty Ducks of Anaheim	NHL	61	6	19	25	46	16	3	10	13	14
2006–07	Anaheim Ducks	NHL	56	8	15	23	44	11	0	3	3	12
2007–08	Anaheim Ducks	NHL	75	9	7	16	48	6	2	0	2	0
2008–09	Anaheim Ducks	NHL	72	5	13	18	34	13	1	1	2	16
2009–10	Anaheim Ducks	NHL	78	9	13	22	32	—	—	—	—	—
2010–11	Anaheim Ducks	NHL	79	1	7	8	26	6	0	1	1	4
NHL totals			1,195	186	312	498	774	95	13	21	34	88

=== International ===
Year	Team	Event	Result	GP	G	A	Pts	PIM
1993	United States	WJC	4th	7	2	3	5	2
1994	United States	OG	8th	8	1	1	2	6
Junior totals				7	2	3	5	2
Senior totals				8	1	1	2	6

== Awards and honors ==
Award	Year
College
All-ECAC Rookie Team	1992
All-ECAC Second Team	1993
ECAC All-Tournament Team	1993
NHL
Stanley Cup (Anaheim Ducks)	2007

== See also ==
- List of NHL players with 1,000 games played
