= List of Edmonton Oilers players =

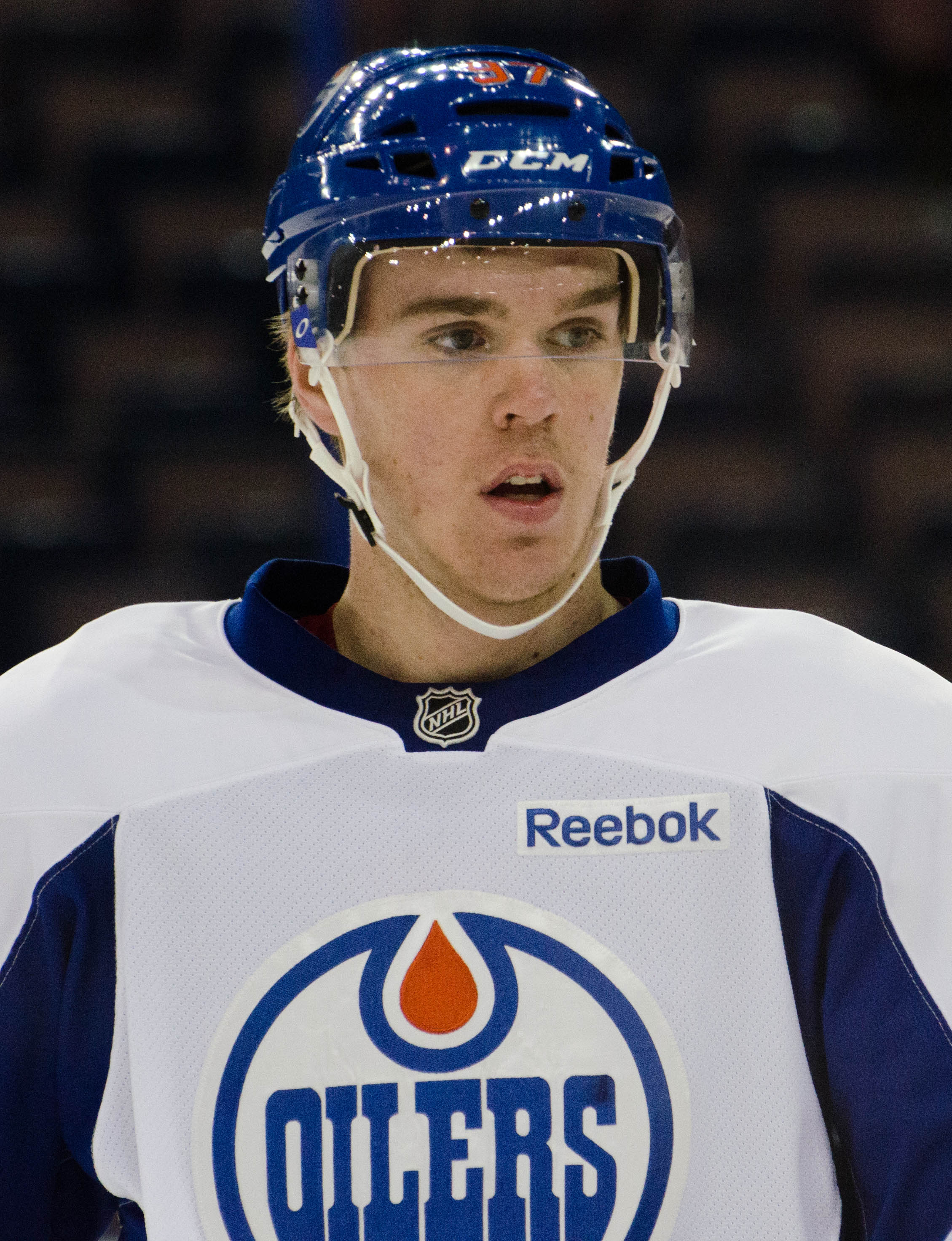
The Oilers selected Connor McDavid first overall in the 2015 NHL entry draft.

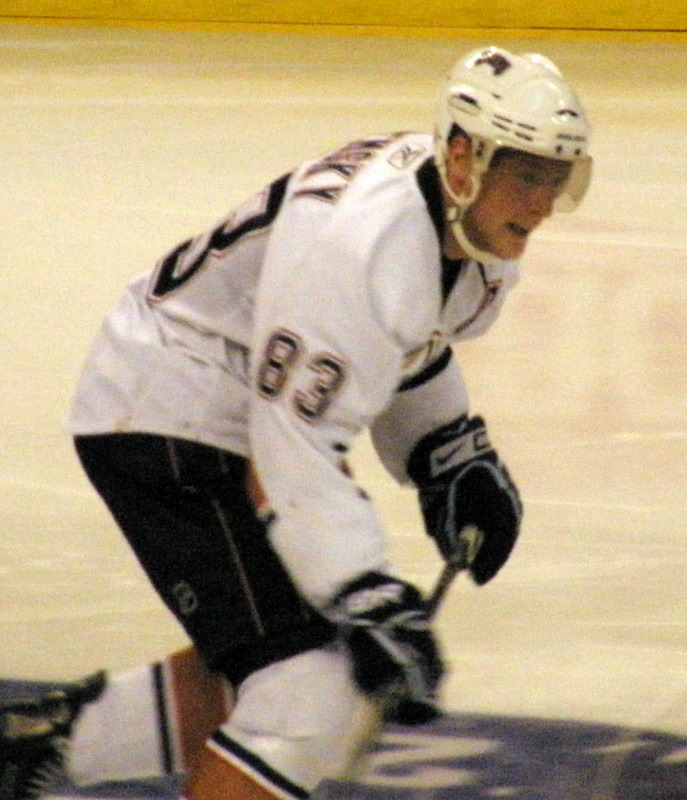
Ales Hemsky led the team in scoring points for four seasons, from 2005–06 to 2008–09.

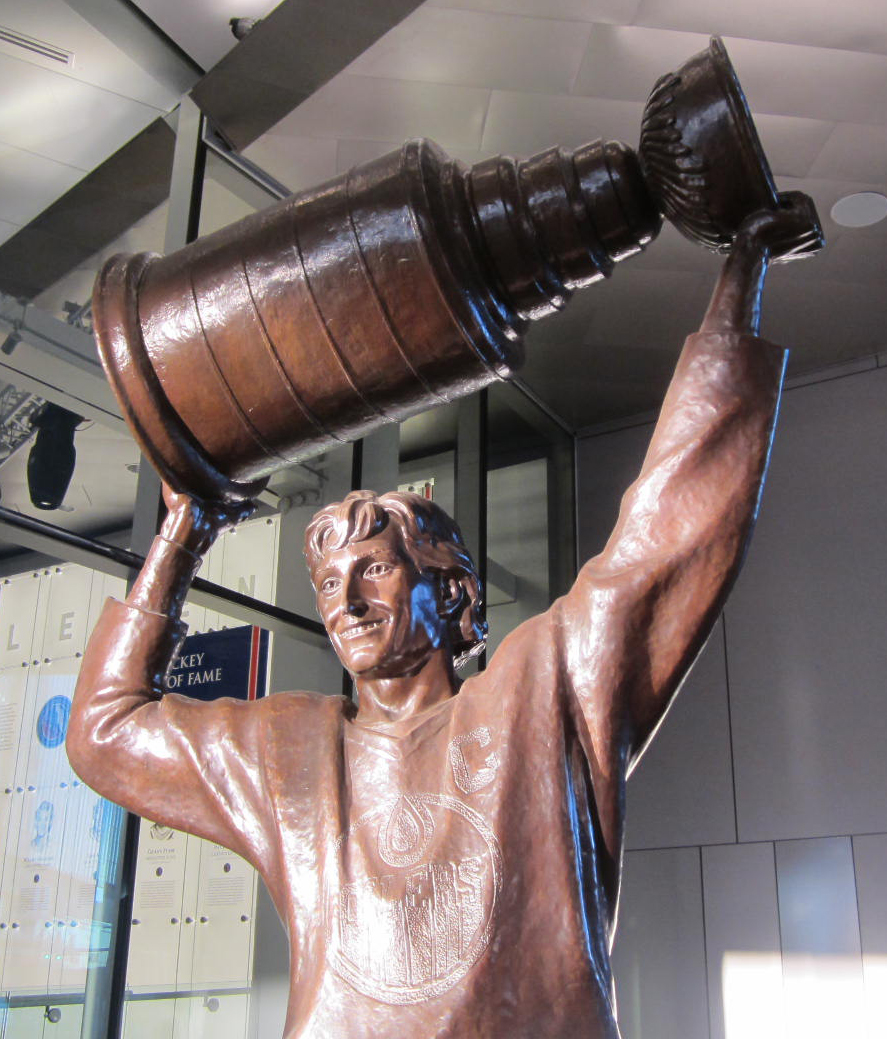
The statue of Wayne Gretzky outside Rogers Place commemorates the Oilers' Stanley Cup victories and the all-time Oiler leader for regular season goals, assists and points and playoff assists and points.

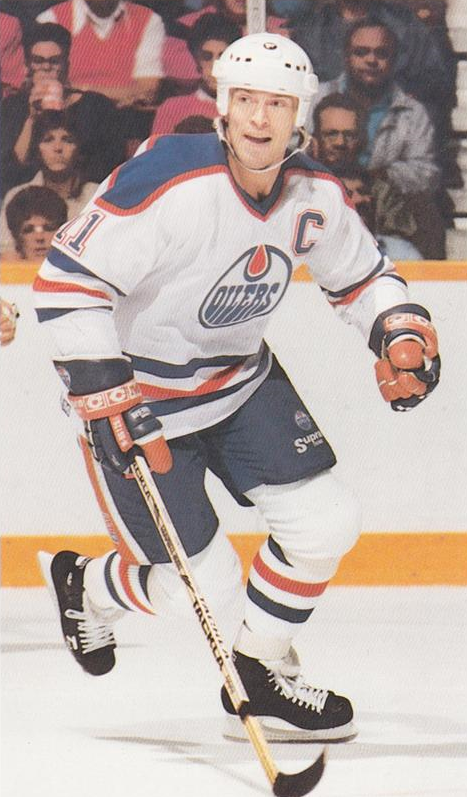
Mark Messier was a member of all five Oiler teams that won the Stanley Cup.

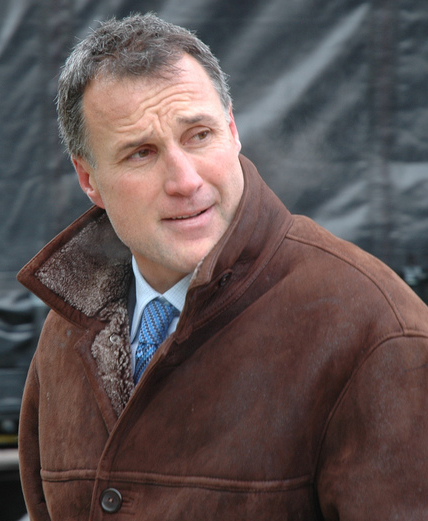
Paul Coffey played the first seven seasons of his Hall of Fame career with the Oilers.

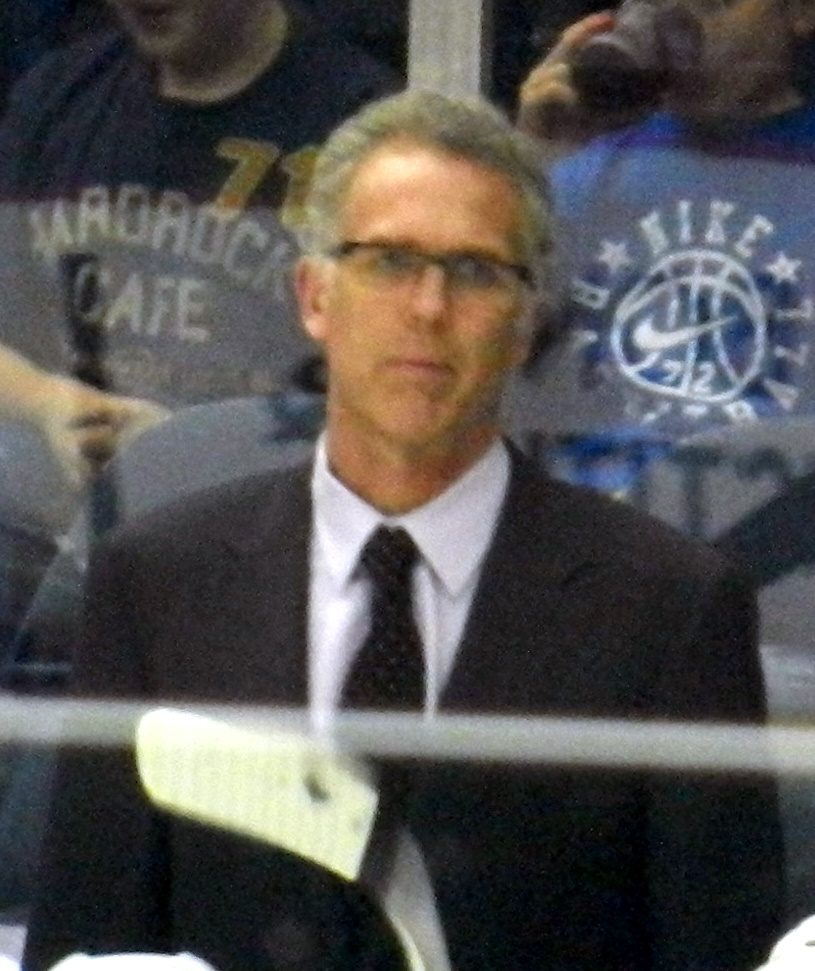
Craig MacTavish played 701 regular season games and 113 playoff games for the Oilers, and coached the team for another 656 regular season games and 36 playoff games.

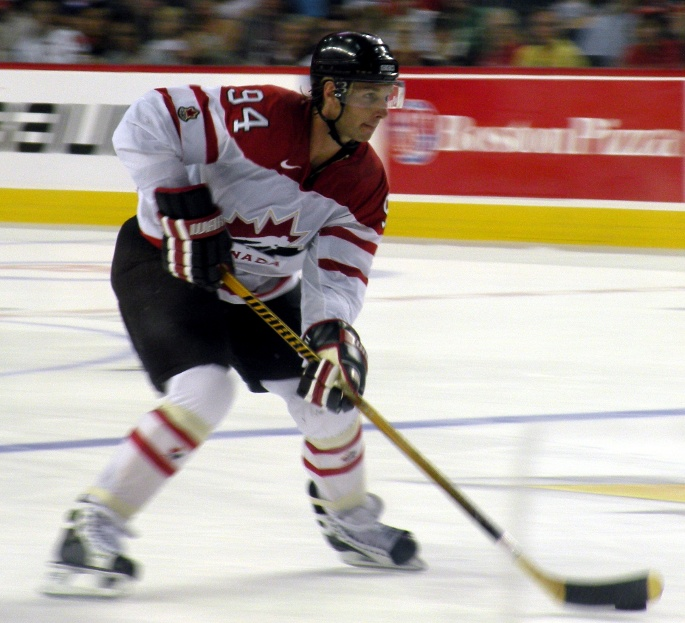
Ryan Smyth played 770 regular season games for Edmonton from 1994 to 2007, and another 201 games from 2011 to 2014. He has represented Canada numerous times in international competition, earning the nickname "Captain Canada".

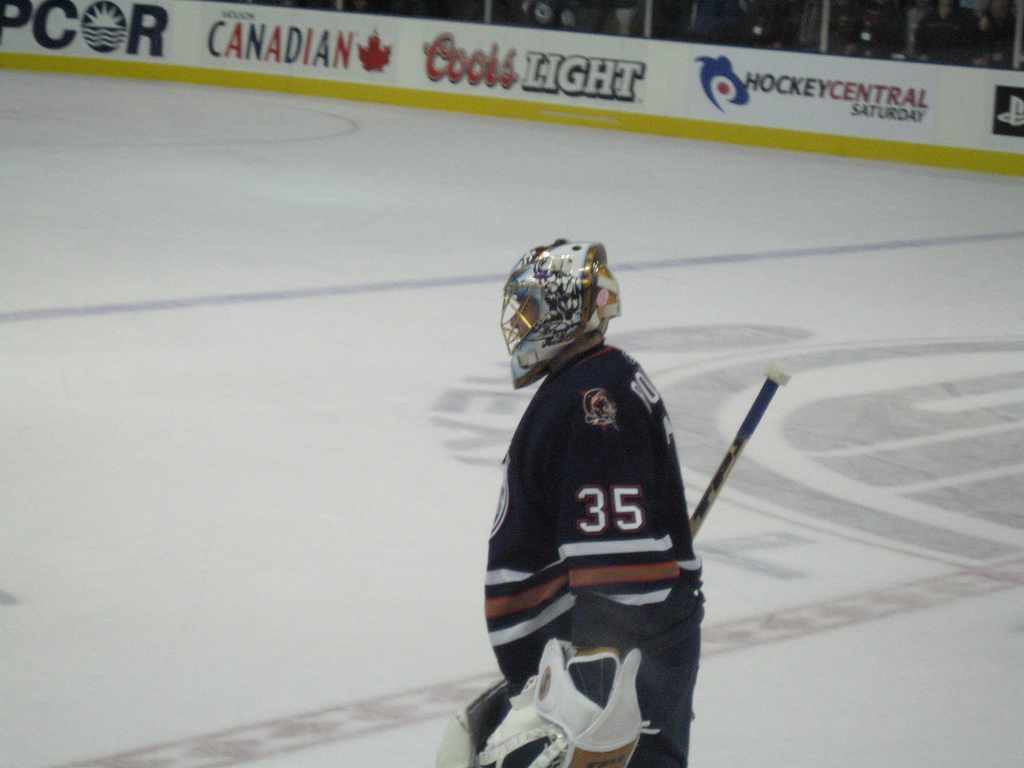
After being acquired by the Oilers at the trade deadline, Dwayne Roloson led the team to the 2006 Stanley Cup Finals.

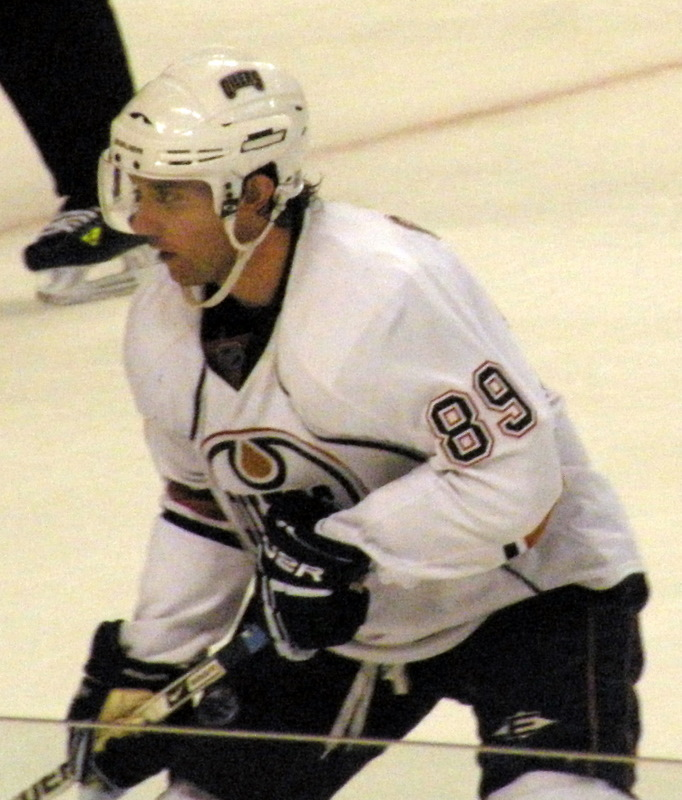
On February 2, 2012, Sam Gagner became the 13th player (and 3rd Oiler) to score 8 or more points in a single game

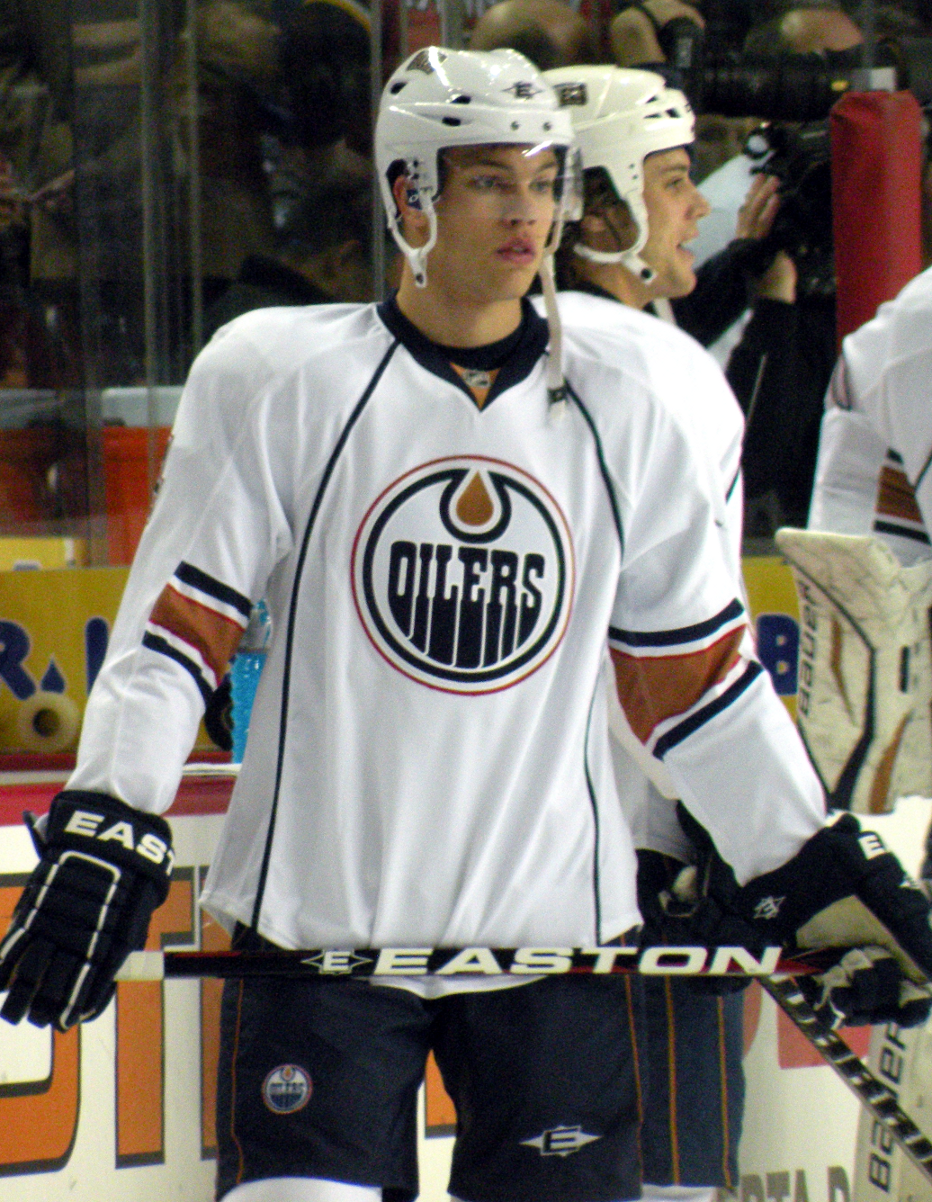
Taylor Hall was the first overall selection in the 2010 NHL entry draft.

The Edmonton Oilers are a franchise in the National Hockey League (NHL), based in Edmonton, Alberta, Canada. They originated as one of the twelve founding franchises of the World Hockey Association (WHA) in 1972, remaining with the league until it ceased operation after the 1978–79 season. The Oilers were one of four remaining WHA franchises to be admitted to the NHL as expansion teams for the 1979–80 season.

As of completion of the 2022–23 season, 600 players have worn the Oilers jersey in the NHL; 539 skaters (forwards and defencemen) and 61 goaltenders. Sixteen of those NHL Oilers also played at least one game for the WHA Oilers.

Kevin Lowe, the Oilers' first ever NHL draft pick, is the leader for both regular season (1,037) and playoff (172) games in an Oilers uniform, for an overall Oilers-leading total of 1,209 games. Amongst goaltenders, Grant Fuhr is the overall leader for total games played as an Oiler, with 534, which includes a team-leading 111 playoff games; goaltender Bill Ranford is the leader for regular season (449) games played. There have been 27 players (18 skaters and 9 goaltenders) who have played only one game – in all cases, one regular season game – with the NHL Oilers.

The Oilers have won the Stanley Cup five times, with 48 players winning the Cup as an Oiler. Seven players (Glenn Anderson, Grant Fuhr, Randy Gregg, Charlie Huddy, Jari Kurri, Kevin Lowe and Mark Messier) were members of all five Cup-winning teams. Ten players from the NHL years have gone on to be elected into the Hockey Hall of Fame, most recently Duncan Keith in June 2025. Another three ex-Oilers who only played for the WHA franchise are also in the Hall of Fame. The Oilers have retired the numbers of eight players.

== Key ==
Stanley Cup winner with the Oilers, or NHL award winner with the Oilers, or elected to the Hockey Hall of Fame. Details are provided in the Notes column.
Currently in the Oilers organization (October 2, 2023). Player names are also in bold text.

Seasons
Lists the first year of the season of the player's first game and the last year of the season of the player's last game of consecutive tenure. For example, a player who played one game in the 2000–01 NHL season would be listed as playing with the team from 2000–2001, regardless of what calendar year the game occurred within. Players who leave and return will show more than one consecutive period. This list includes all players that have played at least one regular season or playoff game for the Edmonton Oilers in the NHL since the 1979–80 season. It does not include any players who only played for the team as a franchise in the WHA from 1972 to 1979.

All players
Nat	Nationality
	Australia
	Canada
	Czech Republic
	Denmark
	Finland
	France
	Germany
	Latvia
	Norway
	Poland
	Russia
	Slovakia
	Sweden
	Switzerland
	United States

Abbreviations
SC	Stanley Cup winner
HHOF	Hockey Hall of Fame member
WHA	Also played for the Oilers in the World Hockey Association

Goaltenders
GP	Games Played
W	Wins
L	Losses
T	Ties
OTL	Overtime Loss
SO	Shutouts
GAA	Goals against average
SV%	Save percentage

Skaters
Pos	Position
C	Centre
D	Defenceman
LW	Left wing
RW	Right wing
GP	Games Played
G	Goals
A	Assists
P	Points
PIM	Penalty minutes

== Goaltenders ==
Note: Statistics are complete through the 2025–26 season.

Name	Nat	Seasons	Regular season								Playoffs						Notes
Name	Nat	Seasons	GP	W	L	T	OTL	SO	GAA	SV%	GP	W	L	SO	GAA	SV%	Notes
Bachman, Richard	(United States)	2013–2015	10	3	4	—	1	1	2.93	.914	—	—	—	—	—	—	
Baron, Marco	(Canada)	1984–1985	1	0	1	0	—	0	3.64	.778	—	—	—	—	—	—	
Berlin, Matt	(Canada)	2022–2023	1	0	0	—	0	0	0.00	1.000	—	—	—	—	—	—	
Brathwaite, Fred	(Canada)	1993–1996	40	5	17	4	—	0	3.52	.885	—	—	—	—	—	—	
Brossoit, Laurent	(Canada)	2014–2018	28	7	13	—	2	0	2.97	.897	1	0	0	0	4.44	.750	
Bryzgalov, Ilya	(Russia)	2013–2014	20	5	8	—	5	1	3.01	.908	—	—	—	—	—	—	
Bunz, Tyler	(Canada)	2014–2015	1	0	0	—	0	0	9.00	.750	—	—	—	—	—	—	
Campbell, Jack	(United States)	2022–2024	41	22	13	—	4	1	3.53	.886	4	1	0	0	1.01	.961	
Conklin, Ty	(United States)	2001–2002; 2003–2006	60	27	19	4	1	2	2.49	.905	1	0	1	0	10.0	.667	
Corsi, Jim	(Canada)	1979–1980	26	8	14	3	—	0	3.65	n/a	—	—	—	—	—	—	
Cowley, Wayne	(Canada)	1993–1994	1	0	1	0	—	0	3.16	.914	—	—	—	—	—	—	
Cutts, Don	(Canada)	1979–1980	6	1	2	1	—	0	3.57	n/a	—	—	—	—	—	—	
Danis, Yann	(Canada)	2011–2013	4	1	0	—	0	0	3.80	.873	—	—	—	—	—	—	
Deslauriers, Jeff	(Canada)	2008–2010	58	20	31	—	4	3	3.27	.901	—	—	—	—	—	—	
Dryden, Dave	(Canada)	1979–1980	14	2	7	3	—	0	4.27	n/a	—	—	—	—	—	—	WHA 1975–79
Dubnyk, Devan	(Canada)	2009–2014	171	61	76	—	21	8	2.88	.910	—	—	—	—	—	—	
Dupuis, Bob	(Canada)	1979–1980	1	0	1	0	—	0	4.00	n/a	—	—	—	—	—	—	
Edwards, Gary	(Canada)	1980–1981	15	5	3	4	—	0	3.62	n/a	1	0	0	0	6.00	n/a	
Essensa, Bob	(Canada)	1996–1999	74	22	28	7	—	1	2.73	.904	1	0	0	0	2.22	.909	
Exelby, Randy	(Canada)	1989–1990	1	0	1	0	—	0	5.00	.833	—	—	—	—	—	—	
Fasth, Viktor	(Sweden)	2013–2015	33	9	18	—	4	0	3.07	.901	—	—	—	—	—	—	
Foster, Norm	(Canada)	1991–1992	10	5	3	0	—	0	2.73	.891	—	—	—	—	—	—	
Fuhr, Grant	(Canada)	1981–1991	423	226	117	54	—	9	3.69	.883	111	74	32	2	3.03	.898	SC 1984, 1985, 1987, 1988, 1990; Vezina 1987–88; HHOF 2003 #31 retired 2003
Gage, Joaquin	(Canada)	1994–1996; 2000–2001	23	4	12	1	—	0	3.74	.870	—	—	—	—	—	—	
Garon, Mathieu	(Canada)	2007–2009	62	32	26	—	1	4	2.78	.909	—	—	—	—	—	—	
Gerber, Martin	(Switzerland)	2010–2011	3	3	0	—	0	0	1.30	.958	—	—	—	—	—	—	
Greenlay, Mike	(Canada)	1989–1990	2	0	0	0	—	0	12.0	.765	—	—	—	—	—	—	
Gustavsson, Jonas	(Sweden)	2016–2017	7	1	3	—	1	0	3.10	.878	—	—	—	—	—	—	
Ing, Peter	(Canada)	1991–1992	12	3	4	0	—	0	4.28	.869	—	—	—	—	—	—	
Ingram, Connor	(Canada)	2025–2026	32	16	10	—	3	2	2.60	.899	5	2	3	0	3.86	.876	
Jarry, Tristan	(Canada)	2025–2026	19	9	6	—	2	1	3.86	.857	1	0	1	0	3.84	.895	
Joseph, Curtis	(Canada)	1995–1998	177	76	76	20	—	14	2.90	.902	24	10	14	5	2.39	.919	
Khabibulin, Nikolai	(Russia)	2009–2013	117	33	67	—	14	5	3.00	.903	—	—	—	—	—	—	
Koskinen, Mikko	(Finland)	2018–2022	164	83	59	—	13	6	2.98	.907	7	1	4	0	3.42	.892	
LaBarbera, Jason	(Canada)	2013–2014	7	1	3	—	0	0	3.28	.870	—	—	—	—	—	—	
LoPresti, Pete	(United States)	1980–1981	2	0	1	0	—	0	4.57	n/a	—	—	—	—	—	—	
Low, Ron	(Canada)	1979–1983	67	30	23	5	—	0	4.03	n/a	3	0	3	0	3.40	n/a	
Markkanen, Jussi	(Finland)	2001–2003; 2003–2007	102	35	35	7	7	5	2.73	.898	7	3	3	1	2.25	.906	
Middlebrook, Lindsay	(Canada)	1982–1983	1	1	0	0	—	0	3.00	.909	—	—	—	—	—	—	
Minard, Mike	(Canada)	1999–2000	1	1	0	0	—	0	3.00	.917	—	—	—	—	—	—	
Mio, Eddie	(Canada)	1979–1981	77	25	28	14	—	1	4.02	n/a	—	—	—	—	—	—	WHA 1978–79
Moog, Andy	(Canada)	1980–1987	235	143	53	21	—	4	3.61	.886	37	23	9	0	3.13	n/a	SC 1984, 1985, 1987
Montoya, Al	(United States)	2017–2018	9	2	2	—	2	0	3.24	.906	—	—	—	—	—	—	
Morrison, Mike	(United States)	2005–2006	21	10	4	—	2	0	2.83	.884	—	—	—	—	—	—	
Nilsson, Anders	(Sweden)	2015–2016	26	10	12	—	2	0	3.14	.901	—	—	—	—	—	—	
Pickard, Calvin	(Canada)	2023–2026	75	39	23	—	4	1	2.84	.896	13	8	2	0	2.72	.892	
Passmore, Steve	(Canada)	1998–1999	6	1	4	1	—	0	2.82	.907	—	—	—	—	—	—	
Ranford, Bill	(Canada)	1987–1996; 1999–2000	449	167	193	54	—	8	3.51	.887	41	25	16	3	2.90	.904	SC 1988, 1990; Conn Smythe 1990
Reaugh, Daryl	(Canada)	1984–1985; 1987–1988	7	1	2	0	—	0	4.83	.872	—	—	—	—	—	—	
Reddick, "Pokey"	(Canada)	1989–1991	13	5	6	2	—	0	3.31	.883	1	0	0	0	0	1.000	SC 1990
Rodrigue, Olivier	(Canada)	2024–2025	2	0	1	—	0	0	3.10	.862	—	—	—	—	—	—	
Roloson, Dwayne	(Canada)	2005–2009	163	78	82	—	24	6	2.78	.909	18	12	5	1	2.33	.927	
Roussel, Dominic	(Canada)	2000–2001	8	1	4	0	—	0	3.62	.861	—	—	—	—	—	—	
Salo, Tommy	(Sweden)	1998–2004	334	147	128	51	—	23	2.44	.906	21	5	16	0	2.59	.908	
Scrivens, Ben	(Canada)	2013–2015	78	24	37	—	11	2	3.09	.903	—	—	—	—	—	—	
Shtalenkov, Mikhail	(Russia)	1998–1999	34	12	17	3	—	3	2.67	.896	—	—	—	—	—	—	
Skinner, Stuart	(Canada)	2020–2026	197	109	62	—	18	9	2.74	.904	50	26	22	4	2.88	.893	
Skorodenski, Warren	(Canada)	1987–1988	3	0	0	0	—	0	6.89	.720	—	—	—	—	—	—	
Smith, Mike	(Canada)	2019–2022	99	56	27	—	10	6	2.70	.913	21	8	11	2	3.30	.908	
Stolarz, Anthony	(United States)	2018–2019	6	0	2	—	0	0	3.77	.897	—	—	—	—	—	—	
Talbot, Cam	(Canada)	2015–2019	227	104	95	—	19	12	2.74	.912	13	7	6	2	2.48	.924	
Takko, Kari	(Finland)	1990–1991	11	4	4	0	—	0	4.20	.867	—	—	—	—	—	—	
Tugnutt, Ron	(Canada)	1991–1993	29	10	13	2	—	0	4.23	.877	2	0	0	0	3.00	.912	
Valiquette, Steve	(Canada)	2003–2004	1	0	0	0	—	0	8.57	.714	—	—	—	—	—	—	
Zanier, Mike	(Canada)	1984–1985	3	1	1	1	—	0	3.89	.880	—	—	—	—	—	—	

== Skaters ==
Note: Statistics are complete through the 2025–26 season.

Name	Nat	Pos	Seasons	Regular season					Playoffs					Notes
Name	Nat	Pos	Seasons	GP	G	A	P	PIM	GP	G	A	P	PIM	Notes
Åberg, Pontus	(Sweden)	LW	2017-2018	16	2	6	8	2	—	—	—	—	—	
Acton, Keith	(Canada)	C	1987–1989	72	14	21	35	68	7	2	0	2	16	SC 1988
Acton, Will	(Canada)	C	2013–2015	33	3	2	5	26	—	—	—	—	—	
Adams, Greg	(Canada)	LW	1988–1989	49	4	5	9	82	—	—	—	—	—	
Aitken, Brad	(Canada)	LW	1990–1991	3	0	1	1	0	—	—	—	—	—	
Aivazoff, Micah	(Canada)	C	1994–1995	21	0	1	1	2	—	—	—	—	—	
Allen, Bobby	(United States)	D	2002–2003	1	0	0	0	0	—	—	—	—	—	
Anderson, Glenn	(Canada)	LW; RW	1980–1991; 1995–1996	845	417	489	906	798	164	81	102	183	314	SC 1984, 1985, 1987, 1988, 1990; HHOF 2008 #9 retired 2009
Archibald, Josh	(United States)	RW	2019–2022	122	19	16	35	56	20	1	1	2	10	
Arcobello, Mark	(United States)	C	2012–2015	78	11	19	30	20	—	—	—	—	—	
Areshenkoff, Ron	(Canada)	C	1979–1980	4	0	0	0	0	—	—	—	—	—	
Arnott, Jason	(Canada)	C	1993–1998	286	100	139	239	489	12	3	6	9	18	
Arsene, Dean	(Canada)	D	2009–2010	13	0	0	0	41	—	—	—	—	—	
Arvidsson, Viktor	(Sweden)	LW	2024–2025	67	15	12	27	24	15	2	5	7	6	
Ashby, Don	(Canada)	C	1979–1981	24	12	12	24	2	3	0	0	0	0	
Athanasiou, Andreas	(Canada)	C	2019–2020	9	1	1	2	4	4	0	0	0	2	
Aulie, Keith	(Canada)	D	2014–2015	31	0	1	1	66	—	—	—	—	—	
Auvitu, Yohann	(France)	D	2017–2018	33	3	6	9	8	—	—	—	—	—	
Baltimore, Bryon	(Canada)	D	1979–1980	2	0	0	0	4	—	—	—	—	—	
Bannister, Drew	(Canada)	D	1996–1998	35	0	3	3	42	12	0	0	0	30	
Barker, Cam	(Canada)	D	2011–2012	25	2	0	2	23	—	—	—	—	—	
Barrie, Tyson	(Canada)	D	2020–2023	190	25	107	132	54	20	1	5	6	10	
Bear, Ethan	(Canada)	D	2017–2018; 2019–2021	132	8	25	33	57	8	0	0	0	2	
Beck, Taylor	(Canada)	RW	2016–2017	3	0	0	0	4	—	—	—	—	—	
Bednarski, John	(Canada)	D	1979–1980	1	0	0	0	0	—	—	—	—	—	
Beers, Bob	(United States)	D	1993–1994	66	10	27	37	74	—	—	—	—	—	
Belanger, Eric	(Canada)	C	2011–2013	104	4	15	19	42	—	—	—	—	—	
Belanger, Jesse	(Canada)	C	1996–1997	6	0	0	0	0	—	—	—	—	—	
Bell, Bruce	(Canada)	D	1989–1990	1	0	0	0	0	—	—	—	—	—	
Belle, Shawn	(Canada)	D	2010–2011	5	0	0	0	0	—	—	—	—	—	
Belov, Anton	(Russia)	D	2013–2014	57	1	6	7	34	—	—	—	—	—	
Bennett, Adam	(Canada)	D	1993–1994	48	3	6	9	49	—	—	—	—	—	
Benning, Brian	(Canada)	D	1992–1993	18	1	7	8	59	—	—	—	—	—	
Benning, Matt	(Canada)	D	2016–2020	248	15	46	61	126	16	0	4	4	18	
Benson, Tyler	(Canada)	LW	2019–2023	38	1	2	3	18	—	—	—	—	—	
Benysek, Ladislav	(Czech Republic)	D	1997–1998	2	0	0	0	0	—	—	—	—	—	
Beranek, Josef	(Czech Republic)	C	1991–1993; 1998–2000	208	42	60	102	108	14	2	1	3	4	
Berehowsky, Drake	(Canada)	D	1997–1998	67	1	6	7	169	12	1	2	3	14	
Bergeron, Marc-Andre	(Canada)	D	2002–2007	189	33	55	88	101	19	2	2	4	14	
Berry, Ken	(Canada)	LW	1981–1984	28	4	6	10	19	—	—	—	—	—	
Beukeboom, Jeff	(Canada)	D	1985–1992	284	12	57	69	733	29	1	3	4	50	SC 1987, 1988, 1990
Bianchin, Wayne	(Canada)	LW	1979–1980	11	0	0	0	7	—	—	—	—	—	
Bisaillon, Sébastien	(Canada)	D	2006–2007	2	0	0	0	0	—	—	—	—	—	
Bishai, Mike	(Canada)	C	2003–2004	14	0	2	2	19	—	—	—	—	—	
Bjugstad, Nick	(United States)	C	2022–2023	19	4	2	6	8	12	3	0	3	16	
Bladon, Tom	(Canada)	D	1980–1981	1	0	0	0	0	—	—	—	—	—	
Blum, John	(United States)	D	1982–1984	9	0	4	4	26	—	—	—	—	—	
Bonsignore, Jason	(United States)	C	1994–1996	21	1	2	3	4	—	—	—	—	—	
Bonvie, Dennis	(Canada)	RW	1994–1996; 1997–1998	14	0	0	0	74	—	—	—	—	—	
Boschman, Laurie	(Canada)	LW	1981–1983	73	10	15	25	220	3	0	1	1	4	
Bouchard, Evan	(Canada)	D	2018–2026	429	76	257	333	154	81	21	67	88	38	
Boulerice, Jesse	(United States)	RW	2008–2009	2	0	0	0	0	—	—	—	—	—	
Bowen, Jason	(Canada)	LW	1997–1998	4	0	0	0	10	—	—	—	—	—	
Brackenbury, Curt	(Canada)	LW	1980–1982	72	2	9	11	165	2	0	0	0	0	
Brassard, Derick	(Canada)	C	2021–2022	15	2	1	3	2	1	0	0	0	0	
Bremberg, Fredrik	(Sweden)	RW	1998–1999	8	0	0	0	2	—	—	—	—	—	
Brewer, Eric	(Canada)	D	2000–2004	315	29	71	100	210	12	2	8	10	8	
Broberg, Philip	(Sweden)	D	2021–2024	81	2	11	13	10	20	2	1	3	4	
Brodziak, Kyle	(Canada)	C	2005–2009; 2018–2019	245	32	36	68	93	—	—	—	—	—	
Brown, Connor	(Canada)	RW	2023–2025	153	17	25	42	20	39	7	8	15	8	
Brown, Dave	(Canada)	RW	1988–1991	140	3	12	15	361	26	0	1	1	36	SC 1990
Brown, Josh	(Canada)	D	2024–2025	10	0	1	1	11	1	0	0	0	0	
Brown, Kevin	(Canada)	RW	1998–2000	19	4	2	6	0	1	0	0	0	0	
Brown, Mike	(United States)	RW	2012–2014	35	1	0	1	72	—	—	—	—	—	
Brown, Sean	(Canada)	D	1996–2002	269	12	23	35	664	4	0	0	0	33	
Brubaker, Jeff	(United States)	LW	1985–1986	4	1	0	1	12	—	—	—	—	—	
Brule, Gilbert	(Canada)	C	2008–2011	117	26	23	49	91	—	—	—	—	—	
Buchberger, Kelly	(Canada)	RW	1986–1999	795	82	158	240	1747	78	9	14	23	116	SC 1987, 1990
Butenschon, Sven	(Germany)	D	2000–2002	21	1	1	2	6	—	—	—	—	—	
Byakin, Ilya	(Russia)	D	1993–1994	44	8	20	28	30	—	—	—	—	—	
Caggiula, Drake	(Canada)	LW	2016-2019; 2024–2025	163	27	23	50	74	13	3	0	3	25	
Callighen, Brett	(Canada)	LW	1979–1982	160	56	89	145	132	14	4	6	10	8	WHA 1976–79
Cammalleri, Michael	(Canada)	LW	2017-2018	51	4	18	22	14	—	—	—	—	—	
Campbell, Colin	(Canada)	D	1979–1980	72	2	11	13	196	3	0	0	0	11	
Carrick, Sam	(Canada)	C	2023–2024	16	2	3	5	12	10	0	1	1	12	
Carroll, Billy	(Canada)	C	1984–1986	70	8	11	19	22	9	0	0	0	4	SC 1985
Carson, Jimmy	(United States)	C	1988–1990	84	50	53	103	36	7	2	1	3	6	
Carter, Anson	(Canada)	C	2000–2003	211	69	88	157	68	6	3	1	4	4	
Carter, Ron	(Canada)	RW	1979–1980	2	0	0	0	0	—	—	—	—	—	
Cave, Colby	(Canada)	C	2018–2020	44	3	1	4	12	—	—	—	—	—	
Ceci, Cody	(Canada)	D	2021–2024	237	11	57	68	52	52	3	10	13	14	
Chartraw, Rick	(United States)	D	1983–1984	24	2	6	8	21	1	0	0	0	2	
Chiasson, Alex	(Canada)	RW	2018–2021	183	42	36	78	107	7	2	1	3	0	
Chimera, Jason	(Canada)	LW	2000–2004	130	19	17	36	93	2	0	2	2	0	
Chipperfield, Ron	(Canada)	C	1979–1980	67	18	19	37	24	—	—	—	—	—	WHA 1977–79
Chorney, Taylor	(United States)	D	2008–2012	59	1	6	7	16	—	—	—	—	—	
Chychrun, Jeff	(Canada)	D	1993–1994	2	0	0	0	0	—	—	—	—	—	
Cierny, Jozef	(Slovakia)	LW	1993–1994	1	0	0	0	0	—	—	—	—	—	
Ciger, Zdeno	(Czechoslovakia) (Slovakia)	LW	1992–1996	204	64	91	155	55	—	—	—	—	—	
Clark, Dean	(Canada)	LW	1983–1984	1	0	0	0	0	—	—	—	—	—	
Clattenburg, Connor	(Canada)	F	2025–2026	5	1	0	1	13	—	—	—	—	—	
Cleary, Daniel	(Canada)	LW	1999–2003	220	31	55	86	127	10	1	2	3	10	
Clendening, Adam	(United States)	D	2015–2016	20	1	5	6	10	—	—	—	—	—	
Cochrane, Glen	(Canada)	D	1988–1989	12	0	0	0	52	—	—	—	—	—	
Coffey, Paul	(Canada)	D	1980–1987	532	209	460	669	693	94	36	67	103	167	SC 1984, 1985, 1987; Norris 1984–85, 1985–86; HHOF 2004 #7 retired 2005
Cogliano, Andrew	(Canada)	C	2007–2011	328	57	89	146	137	—	—	—	—	—	
Cole, Erik	(United States)	LW	2008–2009	63	16	11	27	63	—	—	—	—	—	
Comrie, Mike	(Canada)	C	2000–2003; 2009–2010	235	74	80	154	179	12	2	2	4	10	
Comrie, Paul	(Canada)	C	1999–2000	15	1	2	3	4	—	—	—	—	—	
Conacher, Pat	(Canada)	C	1983–1984	45	2	8	10	31	3	1	0	1	2	SC 1984
Connor, Cam	(Canada)	RW	1979–1980	38	7	13	20	136	—	—	—	—	—	
Cornet, Philippe	(Canada)	LW	2011–2012	2	0	1	1	0	—	—	—	—	—	
Corson, Shayne	(Canada)	LW	1992–1995	192	53	84	137	413	—	—	—	—	—	
Cote, Patrick	(Canada)	LW	2000–2001	6	0	0	0	18	—	—	—	—	—	
Cote, Ray	(Canada)	C	1982–1985	15	0	0	0	4	14	3	2	5	4	
Courtnall, Geoff	(Canada)	LW	1987–1988	12	4	4	8	15	19	0	3	3	23	SC 1988
Cracknell, Adam	(Canada)	RW	2015–2016	8	0	0	0	6	—	—	—	—	—	
Cross, Cory	(Canada)	D	2002–2006	113	11	20	31	102	6	0	1	1	20	
Currie, Dan	(Canada)	LW	1990–1993	17	1	0	1	4	—	—	—	—	—	
Currie, Josh	(Canada)	RW	2018–2019	21	2	3	5	2	—	—	—	—	—	
Czerkawski, Mariusz	(Poland)	RW	1995–1997	113	38	38	76	24	12	2	1	3	10	
Dach, Colton	(Canada)	C	2025–2026	8	2	2	4	5	5	0	1	1	4	
Damphousse, Vincent	(Canada)	C	1991–1992	80	38	51	89	53	16	6	8	14	8	
Davidson, Brandon	(Canada)	D	2014–2018	114	8	9	17	46	—	—	—	—	—	
DeBrusk, Louie	(Canada)	LW	1991–1997	228	19	12	31	797	6	0	0	0	4	
Demers, Jason	(Canada)	D	2022–2023	1	0	0	0	0	—	—	—	—	—	
Dermott, Travis	(Canada)	D	2024–2025	10	0	0	0	2	—	—	—	—	—	
Desharnais, David	(Canada)	C	2016-2017	18	2	2	4	6	13	1	3	4	0	
Desharnais, Vincent	(Canada)	D	2022–2024	114	1	15	16	85	28	0	3	3	30	
De Vries, Greg	(Canada)	D	1995–1998	115	8	9	17	144	19	0	1	1	29	
Devereaux, Boyd	(Canada)	C	1997–2000	175	15	31	46	49	1	0	0	0	0	
Dickinson, Jason	(Canada)	C	2025–2026	17	1	3	4	10	4	2	1	3	0	
Dineen, Cam	(United States)	D	2024–2025	4	0	0	0	0	—	—	—	—	—	
Dollas, Bobby	(Canada)	D	1997–1998	30	2	5	7	22	11	0	0	0	16	
Donnelly, Dave	(Canada)	C	1987–1988	4	0	0	0	4	—	—	—	—	—	
Dopita, Jiri	(Czech Republic)	C	2002–2003	21	1	5	6	11	—	—	—	—	—	
Dowd, Jim	(United States)	C	1998–2000	70	5	18	23	45	5	2	1	3	4	
Draisaitl, Leon	(Germany)	C	2014–2026	855	434	619	1053	366	102	55	96	151	59	Hart 2019–20; Art Ross 2019–20; Ted Lindsay 2019–20; Rocket Richard 2024–25
Driscoll, Peter	(Canada)	LW	1979–1981	60	3	8	11	97	3	0	0	0	0	WHA 1978–79
Dufresne, Donald	(Canada)	D	1995–1997	64	1	7	8	31	3	0	0	0	0	
Dvorak, Radek	(Czech Republic)	RW	2002–2006	154	27	59	86	66	20	1	2	3	4	
Dykstra, Steve	(Canada)	D	1987–1988	15	2	3	5	39	—	—	—	—	—	
Eager, Ben	(Canada)	LW	2011–2014	84	9	7	16	134	—	—	—	—	—	
Eberle, Jordan	(Canada)	RW	2010–2017	507	165	217	382	120	13	0	2	2	2	
Ekholm, Mattias	(Sweden)	D	2022–2026	247	30	103	133	111	50	7	18	25	28	
Elik, Todd	(Canada)	C	1992–1994	18	1	9	10	14	—	—	—	—	—	
Emberson, Ty	(United States)	D	2024–2026	148	4	21	25	41	15	0	1	1	0	
Ennis, Jim	(Canada)	D	1987–1988	5	1	0	1	10	—	—	—	—	—	
Ennis, Tyler	(Canada)	C	2019–2021	39	5	8	13	10	5	1	1	2	4	
Eriksson, Peter	(Sweden)	LW	1989–1990	20	3	3	6	24	—	—	—	—	—	
Erne, Adam	(United States)	LW	2023–2024	24	1	1	2	9	—	—	—	—	—	
Esau, Len	(Canada)	D	1994–1995	14	0	6	6	15	—	—	—	—	—	
Falloon, Pat	(Canada)	RW	1998–2000	115	22	36	58	24	4	0	1	1	4	
Fayne, Mark	(United States)	D	2014–2017	147	4	13	17	32	—	—	—	—	—	
Fedun, Taylor	(Canada)	D	2013–2014	4	2	0	2	0	—	—	—	—	—	
Ference, Andrew	(Canada)	D	2013–2016	147	6	26	32	108	—	—	—	—	—	
Ferguson, Scott	(Canada)	D	1997–1998; 2000–2004	201	7	13	20	288	11	0	0	0	8	
Ferraro, Chris	(United States)	C	1998–1999	2	1	0	1	0	—	—	—	—	—	
Fistric, Mark	(Canada)	D	2012–2013	25	0	6	6	32	—	—	—	—	—	
Flett, Bill	(Canada)	RW	1979–1980	20	5	2	7	2	—	—	—	—	—	WHA 1976–79
Foegele, Warren	(Canada)	LW	2021–2024	231	45	50	95	99	47	5	7	12	43	
Fogolin, Lee	(United States)	D	1979–1987	586	36	125	161	886	78	5	13	18	115	SC 1984, 1985
Forbes, Mike	(Canada)	D	1979–1980; 1981–1982	18	1	7	8	26	—	—	—	—	—	
Foster, Kurtis	(Canada)	D	2010–2011	74	8	14	22	45	—	—	—	—	—	
Fotiu, Nick	(United States)	LW	1988–1989	1	0	0	0	0	—	—	—	—	—	
Fraser, Colin	(Canada)	C	2010–2011	67	3	2	5	60	—	—	—	—	—	
Fraser, Iain	(Canada)	C	1994–1995	9	3	0	3	0	—	—	—	—	—	
Fraser, Mark	(Canada)	D	2013–2014	23	1	0	1	43	—	—	—	—	—	
Fraser, Matt	(Canada)	LW	2014–2015	36	5	4	9	10	—	—	—	—	—	
Fraser, Scott	(Canada)	RW	1997–1998	29	12	11	23	6	11	1	1	2	0	
Frederic, Trent	(United States)	C	2024–2026	75	4	3	7	58	26	1	3	4	25	
Friedman, Doug	(United States)	LW	1997–1998	16	0	0	0	20	—	—	—	—	—	
Frycer, Miroslav	(Czechoslovakia)	RW	1988–1989	14	5	5	10	18	—	—	—	—	—	
Gagner, Sam	(Canada)	C	2007–2014; 2018–2020; 2023–2024	570	116	211	327	274	—	—	—	—	—	
Gambardella, Joe	(United States)	C	2018–2019	15	0	3	3	2	—	—	—	—	—	
Gare, Danny	(Canada)	RW	1986–1987	18	1	3	4	6	—	—	—	—	—	
Garrison, Jason	(Canada)	D	2018–2019	17	1	0	1	8	—	—	—	—	—	
Gazdic, Luke	(Canada)	LW	2013–2016	136	5	3	8	194	—	—	—	—	—	
Gelinas, Martin	(Canada)	LW	1988–1993	258	60	60	120	156	53	6	12	18	41	SC 1990
Gilbert, Tom	(United States)	D	2006–2012	384	33	125	158	106	—	—	—	—	—	
Gilchrist, Brent	(Canada)	C	1992–1993	60	10	10	20	47	—	—	—	—	—	
Giroux, Alexandre	(Canada)	LW	2010–2011	8	1	1	2	2	—	—	—	—	—	
Glencross, Curtis	(Canada)	LW	2007–2008	26	9	4	13	28	—	—	—	—	—	
Glynn, Brian	(Canada)	D	1991–1993	89	6	18	24	66	16	4	1	5	12	
Gordon, Boyd	(Canada)	C	2013–2015	142	14	20	34	37	—	—	—	—	—	
Gorence, Tom	(United States)	RW	1983–1984	12	1	1	2	0	—	—	—	—	—	
Granlund, Markus	(Finland)	C	2019–2020	34	3	1	4	14	—	—	—	—	—	
Gravel, Kevin	(United States)	D	2018–2019	36	0	3	3	4	—	—	—	—	—	
Graves, Adam	(Canada)	LW	1989–1991	139	16	30	46	250	40	7	10	17	39	SC 1990
Graves, Steve	(Canada)	LW	1983–1984; 1986–1988	35	5	4	9	10	—	—	—	—	—	
Grebeshkov, Denis	(Russia)	D	2007–2010; 2013–2014	197	16	61	77	88	—	—	—	—	—	
Green, Josh	(Canada)	LW	2000–2003; 2011–2012	88	11	8	19	71	3	0	0	0	0	
Green, Mike	(Canada)	D	2019–2020	2	0	0	0	0	—	—	—	—	—	
Greene, Matt	(United States)	D	2005–2008	151	1	12	13	205	18	0	1	1	34	
Gregg, Randy	(Canada)	D	1981–1990	453	40	148	188	309	130	13	39	52	133	SC 1984, 1985, 1987, 1988, 1990
Gretzky, Wayne	(Canada)	C	1979–1988	696	583	1086	1669	323	120	81	171	252	56	WHA 1978–79; SC 1984, 1985, 1987, 1988; Hart 1979–87 (×8); Art Ross 1981–87 (×7); Pearson 1982–85 (×4), 1986–87; Conn Smythe 1985, 1988; Lady Byng 1979–80; Plus-Minus 1983–85 (×2), 1986–87; HHOF 1999 #99 retired, league wide, 1999
Grier, Mike	(United States)	RW	1996–2002	448	81	102	183	292	34	6	4	10	31	
Grieve, Brent	(Canada)	LW	1993–1994	24	13	5	18	14	—	—	—	—	—	
Griffith, Seth	(Canada)	C	2021–2022	1	0	0	0	0	—	—	—	—	—	
Gryba, Eric	(Canada)	D	2015–2018	114	3	11	14	171	3	0	0	0	4	
Guerin, Bill	(United States)	RW	1997–1998	211	79	82	161	354	20	10	5	15	28	
Haakana, Kari	(Finland)	D	2002–2003	13	0	0	0	4	—	—	—	—	—	
Haas, David	(Canada)	LW	1990–1991	5	1	0	1	0	—	—	—	—	—	
Haas, Gaetan	(Switzerland)	C	2019–2021	92	7	6	13	16	3	0	0	0	4	
Habscheid, Marc	(Canada)	C	1981–1985	74	10	16	26	26	—	—	—	—	—	
Hagman, Matti	(Finland)	C	1980–1982	147	41	71	112	34	12	5	1	6	6	
Hajt, Chris	(Canada)	D	2000–2001	1	0	0	0	0	—	—	—	—	—	
Hall, Taylor	(Canada)	LW	2010–2016	381	132	196	328	234	—	—	—	—	—	
Halward, Doug	(Canada)	D	1988–1989	24	0	7	7	25	2	0	0	0	0	
Hamblin, James	(Canada)	F	2022–2024	41	2	1	3	2	—	—	—	—	—	
Hamilton, Al	(Canada)	D	1979–1980	31	4	15	19	20	1	0	0	0	0	WHA 1972–79 #3 retired 1980
Hamilton, Curtis	(United States)	LW	2014–2015	1	0	0	0	0	—	—	—	—	—	
Hamilton, Ryan	(Canada)	LW	2013–2015	18	2	1	3	6	—	—	—	—	—	
Hammond, Ken	(Canada)	D	1988–1989	5	0	1	1	8	—	—	—	—	—	
Hamrlik, Roman	(Czech Republic)	D	1997–2000	196	22	81	103	186	20	0	7	7	18	
Hannan, Dave	(Canada)	LW	1987–1988	51	9	11	20	43	12	1	1	2	8	SC 1988
Harrison, Jim	(Canada)	C	1979–1980	3	0	0	0	0	—	—	—	—	—	WHA 1972–74
Hartikainen, Teemu	(Finland)	LW	2010–2013	52	6	7	13	16	—	—	—	—	—	
Harvey, Todd	(Canada)	RW	2005–2006	63	5	2	7	32	10	1	1	2	4	
Hauer, Brett	(United States)	D	1995–1996; 1999–2000	34	4	4	8	32	—	—	—	—	—	
Hawgood, Greg	(Canada)	D	1990–1993	55	7	25	32	63	13	0	3	3	23	
Hecht, Jochen	(Germany)	C	2001–2002	82	16	24	40	60	—	—	—	—	—	
Hejda, Jan	(Czech Republic)	D	2006–2007	39	1	8	9	20	—	—	—	—	—	
Hemsky, Ales	(Czech Republic)	RW	2002–2014	652	142	335	477	303	30	6	11	17	14	
Hendricks, Matt	(United States)	C	2013–2017	214	20	18	38	245	—	—	—	—	—	
Henrique, Adam	(Canada)	C	2023–2026	168	21	30	51	38	40	8	6	14	6	
Henry, Alex	(Canada)	D	2002–2003	3	0	0	0	0	—	—	—	—	—	
Herbers, Ian	(Canada)	D	1993–1994	22	0	2	2	32	—	—	—	—	—	
Hicks, Doug	(Canada)	D	1979–1982	186	17	67	84	183	12	1	1	2	6	
Hopkins, Dean	(Canada)	RW	1985–1986	1	0	0	0	0	—	—	—	—	—	
Holloway, Dylan	(Canada)	C	2022–2024	89	9	9	18	56	26	5	2	7	8	
Horak, Roman	(Czech Republic)	C	2013–2014	2	1	0	1	0	—	—	—	—	—	
Horcoff, Shawn	(Canada)	C	2000–2013	796	162	285	447	511	35	10	13	23	18	
Hordichuk, Darcy	(Canada)	LW	2011–2013	47	1	2	3	66	—	—	—	—	—	
Howard, Isaac	(United States)	LW	2025–2026	29	2	3	5	12	—	—	—	—	—	
Hrkac, Tony	(Canada)	C	1997–1998	36	8	11	19	10	12	0	3	3	2	
Huard, Bill	(Canada)	LW	1997–1999	33	0	1	1	72	4	0	0	0	2	
Huddy, Charlie	(Canada)	D	1980–1991	694	81	287	368	500	138	16	61	77	104	SC 1984, 1985, 1987, 1988, 1990; Plus-Minus 1982–83
Hudson, Mike	(Canada)	C	1992–1993	5	0	1	1	2	—	—	—	—	—	
Hughes, John	(Canada)	D	1980–1981	18	0	3	3	30	—	—	—	—	—	WHA 1978–79
Hughes, Pat	(Canada)	RW	1980–1985	300	88	83	171	330	55	7	18	25	40	SC 1984, 1985
Hulbig, Joe	(United States)	LW	1996–1999	24	2	2	4	4	6	0	1	1	2	
Hunt, Brad	(Canada)	D	2013–2016	21	1	2	3	2	—	—	—	—	—	
Hunter, Dave	(Canada)	LW	1979–1988; 1988–1989	653	119	171	290	776	105	16	24	40	211	WHA 1978–79; SC 1984, 1985, 1987
Hutson, Quinn	(United States)	F	2024–2026	6	1	0	1	2	—	—	—	—	—	
Hyman, Zach	(Canada)	C	2021–2026	366	175	135	310	183	74	37	25	62	40	
Intranuovo, Ralph	(Canada)	LW	1994–1997	19	2	3	5	4	—	—	—	—	—	
Isbister, Brad	(Canada)	LW	2002–2004	64	13	10	23	63	6	0	1	1	12	
Issel, Kim	(Canada)	RW	1988–1989	4	0	0	0	0	—	—	—	—	—	
Jackson, Don	(United States)	D	1981–1986	266	15	45	60	508	52	4	5	9	147	SC 1984, 1985
Jacques, Jean-Francois	(Canada)	LW	2005–2011	160	9	8	17	185	—	—	—	—	—	
Jalo, Risto	(Finland)	C	1985–1986	3	0	3	3	0	—	—	—	—	—	
Jalonen, Kari	(Finland)	C	1983–1984	3	0	0	0	0	—	—	—	—	—	
Janmark, Mattias	(Sweden)	C	2022–2026	260	17	46	63	120	52	7	6	13	28	
Jarventie, Roby	(Finland)	LW	2025–2026	3	0	0	0	0	—	—	—	—	—	
Joensuu, Jesse	(Finland)	LW	2013–2015	62	5	4	9	30	—	—	—	—	—	
Johnson, Aaron	(Canada)	D	2009–2010	19	3	4	7	16	—	—	—	—	—	
Jokinen, Jussi	(Finland)	LW	2017–2018	14	0	1	1	2	—	—	—	—	—	
Jones, Caleb	(United States)	D	2018–2021	93	5	14	19	22	2	0	0	0	0	
Jones, Max	(United States)	LW	2024–2026	40	4	3	7	19	—	—	—	—	—	
Jones, Ryan	(Canada)	LW	2009–2014	247	40	32	72	141	—	—	—	—	—	
Jonsson, Tomas	(Sweden)	D	1988–1989	20	1	10	11	22	4	2	0	2	6	
Joseph, Chris	(Canada)	D	1987–1994	154	12	39	51	205	5	1	3	4	2	
Jurco, Tomas	(Slovakia)	RW	2019–2020	12	0	2	2	4	—	—	—	—	—	
Kahun, Dominik	(Czech Republic)	C	2020–2021	48	9	6	15	2	2	0	0	0	0	
Kane, Evander	(Canada)	LW	2021–2025	161	62	49	111	198	68	26	16	42	164	
Kapanen, Kasperi	(Finland)	RW	2024–2026	98	13	17	30	28	18	7	5	12	18	
Kassian, Zack	(Canada)	RW	2015–2022	412	55	80	135	556	37	6	3	9	41	
Keith, Duncan	(Canada)	D	2021–2022	64	1	20	21	22	16	1	4	5	4	HHOF 2025
Kelly, Steve	(Canada)	LW	1996–1998	27	1	2	3	14	6	0	0	0	2	
Kemp, Philip	(United States)	D	2023–2024	1	0	0	0	0	—	—	—	—	—	
Kennedy, Dean	(Canada)	D	1994–1995	40	2	8	10	25	—	—	—	—	—	
Kerch, Alexander	(Latvia)	LW	1993–1994	5	0	0	0	2	—	—	—	—	—	
Kerr, Reg	(Canada)	D	1983–1984	3	0	0	0	0	—	—	—	—	—	
Khaira, Jujhar	(Canada)	LW	2015–2021	258	24	39	63	185	8	1	0	1	8	
Kilger, Chad	(Canada)	C	1998–2001	87	9	5	14	39	7	0	0	0	4	
Klefbom, Oscar	(Sweden)	D	2013–2020	378	34	122	156	74	16	2	5	7	0	
Klima, Petr	(Czech Republic)	LW	1989–1993; 1996–1997	274	119	90	209	337	60	13	10	23	36	SC 1990
Klingberg, John	(Sweden)	D	2024–2025	11	1	3	4	8	19	1	3	4	2	
Klinkhammer, Rob	(Canada)	LW	2014–2016	54	2	2	4	29	—	—	—	—	—	
Koekkoek, Slater	(Canada)	D	2020–2022	37	1	4	5	18	4	0	1	1	0	
Kolanos, Krys	(Canada)	C	2005–2006	6	0	0	0	2	—	—	—	—	—	
Korpikoski, Lauri	(Finland)	LW	2015–2016	71	10	12	22	10	—	—	—	—	—	
Kostin, Klim	(Russia)	C/LW	2022–2023	57	11	10	21	66	12	3	2	5	9	
Kotalik, Ales	(Czech Republic)	RW	2008–2009	19	7	4	11	6	—	—	—	—	—	
Kovalenko, Andrei	(Russia)	RW	1996–1999	176	51	58	109	139	13	4	3	7	8	
Kravchuk, Igor	(Russia)	D	1992–1996	160	27	61	88	57	—	—	—	—	—	
Krushelnyski, Mike	(Canada)	C	1984–1988	290	95	131	226	213	68	16	23	39	68	SC 1985, 1987, 1988
Kulak, Brett	(Canada)	D	2021–2026	295	15	56	71	111	75	3	17	20	43	
Kulak, Stu	(Canada)	RW	1986–1987	23	3	1	4	41	—	—	—	—	—	
Kulikov, Dmitri	(Russia)	D	2020–2021	48	0	4	4	28	3	0	0	0	0	
Kurri, Jari	(Finland)	RW	1980–1990	754	474	569	1043	348	146	92	110	202	101	SC 1984, 1985, 1987, 1988, 1990; Lady Byng 1984–85; HHOF 2001 #17 retired 2001
Kytnar, Milan	(Slovakia)	C	2011–2012	1	0	0	0	0	—	—	—	—	—	
Lacombe, Normand	(Canada)	RW	1986–1990	133	30	22	52	116	26	5	1	6	49	SC 1988
LaCouture, Dan	(United States)	LW	1998–2001	45	2	4	6	39	1	0	0	0	0	
Lacroix, Daniel	(Canada)	LW	1998–1999	4	0	0	0	13	—	—	—	—	—	
Laflamme, Christian	(Canada)	D	1998–2000	61	0	6	6	32	4	0	1	1	2	
Laforge, Marc	(Canada)	D	1993–1994	5	0	0	0	21	—	—	—	—	—	
Lagesson, William	(Sweden)	D	2019–2022	57	0	6	6	22	—	—	—	—	—	
Lamb, Mark	(Canada)	C	1987–1992	176	24	54	78	127	59	7	19	26	40	SC 1990
Lander, Anton	(Sweden)	C	2011–2017	215	10	25	35	56	—	—	—	—	—	
Laraque, Georges	(Canada)	LW	1997–2006	490	43	68	111	826	36	3	6	9	64	
Lariviere, Garry	(Canada)	D	1980–1983	92	1	25	26	61	14	0	5	5	8	
Lavoie, Raphael	(Canada)	C	2023–2024	7	0	0	0	2	—	—	—	—	—	
Larsen, Philip	(Denmark)	D	2013–2014	30	3	9	12	8	—	—	—	—	—	
Larson, Reed	(United States)	D	1988–1989	10	2	7	9	15	—	—	—	—	—	
Larsson, Adam	(Sweden)	D	2016–2021	329	16	52	68	192	19	2	6	8	6	
Lazar, Curtis	(Canada)	C/RW	2025–2026	45	4	2	6	10	5	0	0	0	0	
LeBlanc, John	(Canada)	LW	1988–1989	2	1	0	1	0	1	0	0	0	0	
Lehman, Tommy	(Sweden)	C	1989–1990	1	0	0	0	0	—	—	—	—	—	
Lemay, Moe	(Canada)	LW	1986–1988	14	1	2	3	38	9	2	1	3	11	SC 1987
Leroux, Francois	(Canada)	D	1988–1993	11	0	3	3	11	—	—	—	—	—	
Letestu, Mark	(Canada)	C	2015–2018	220	34	45	79	37	13	5	6	11	2	
Lindgren, Mats	(Sweden)	C	1996–1999	199	29	39	68	76	24	1	5	6	10	
Lindstrom, Willy	(Sweden)	RW	1982–1985	163	40	41	81	58	53	12	17	29	22	SC 1984, 1985
Linglet, Charles	(Canada)	LW	2009–2010	5	0	0	0	2	—	—	—	—	—	
Linseman, Ken	(Canada)	C	1982–1984; 1990–1991	200	58	120	178	394	37	16	13	29	87	SC 1984
Lowe, Keegan	(United States)	D	2017–2018	2	0	0	0	0	—	—	—	—	—	
Lowe, Kevin	(Canada)	D	1979–1992; 1996–1998	1037	74	310	384	1236	172	9	43	52	156	SC 1984, 1985, 1987, 1988, 1990; King Clancy 1989–90; HHOF 2020 #4 retired 2021
Lucic, Milan	(Canada)	LW	2016–2019	243	39	65	104	221	13	2	4	6	20	
Lumley, Dave	(Canada)	RW	1979–1984; 1984–1987	386	90	140	230	582	61	6	8	14	131	SC 1984, 1985
Luoma, Mikko	(Finland)	D	2003–2004	3	0	1	1	0	—	—	—	—	—	
Lupul, Joffrey	(Canada)	C	2006–2007	81	16	12	28	45	—	—	—	—	—	
Lynch, Doug	(Canada)	D	2003–2004	2	0	0	0	0	—	—	—	—	—	
MacDonald, Blair	(Canada)	RW	1979–1981	131	65	72	137	33	3	0	3	3	0	WHA 1973–76, 1977–79
MacIntyre, Steve	(Canada)	LW	2008–2011; 2013–2014	60	2	1	3	140	—	—	—	—	—	
Maciver, Norm	(Canada)	D	1989–1992	79	8	39	47	52	31	1	6	7	18	
MacTavish, Craig	(Canada)	C	1985–1994	701	155	176	331	680	113	13	24	37	143	SC 1987, 1988, 1990
Makkonen, Kari	(Finland)	RW	1979–1980	9	2	2	4	0	—	—	—	—	—	
Maley, David	(United States)	LW	1991–1993	36	4	7	11	75	10	1	1	2	4	
Mallette, Troy	(Canada)	LW	1991–1992	15	1	3	4	36	—	—	—	—	—	
Malone, Brad	(Canada)	C	2017–2019; 2021–2023	41	1	1	2	18	2	0	0	0	12	
Maltby, Kirk	(Canada)	LW	1993–1996	164	21	17	38	184	—	—	—	—	—	
Manderville, Kent	(Canada)	C	1995–1996	37	3	5	8	38	—	—	—	—	—	
Mangiapane, Andrew	(Canada)	LW	2025–2026	52	7	7	14	36	—	—	—	—	—	
Manning, Brandon	(Canada)	D	2018–2020	22	2	0	2	21	—	—	—	—	—	
Manson, Dave	(Canada)	D	1991–1994	219	33	75	108	570	16	3	9	12	44	
Mantha, Moe	(United States)	D	1987–1988	25	0	6	6	26	—	—	—	—	—	
Marchant, Todd	(United States)	LW	1993–2003	678	136	207	343	490	43	7	6	13	42	
Marchment, Bryan	(Canada)	D	1994–1998	216	7	37	44	576	3	0	0	0	4	
Marincin, Martin	(Slovakia)	D	2013–2015	85	1	10	11	32	—	—	—	—	—	
Mark, Gord	(Canada)	D	1993–1995	30	0	3	3	78	—	—	—	—	—	
Marody, Cooper	(United States)	C	2018–2019; 2021–2022	7	0	1	1	0	—	—	—	—	—	
Maroon, Patrick	(United States)	LW	2015–2018	154	49	37	86	189	13	3	5	8	28	
Martin, Terry	(Canada)	F	1984–1985	4	0	2	2	0	—	—	—	—	—	
Martini, Darcy	(Canada)	D	1993–1994	2	0	0	0	0	—	—	—	—	—	
May, Alan	(Canada)	LW	1988–1989	3	1	0	1	7	—	—	—	—	—	
McAmmond, Dean	(Canada)	LW	1993–1999	303	61	100	161	149	12	1	4	5	12	
McClelland, Kevin	(Canada)	RW	1983–1990	428	56	94	150	1291	93	10	17	27	276	SC 1984, 1985, 1987, 1988
McDavid, Connor	(Canada)	C	2015–2026	794	409	811	1220	330	100	45	111	156	30	Hart 2016–17, 2020–21, 2022–23; Art Ross 2016–17, 2017–18, 2020–21, 2021–22, 2022–23; Ted Lindsay 2016–17, 2017–18, 2020–21, 2022–23; Rocket Richard 2022–23; Conn Smythe 2024; Captain, 2016–present
McDonald, Colin	(United States)	RW	2009–2010	2	1	0	1	0	—	—	—	—	—	
McDougall, Bill	(Canada)	C	1992–1993	4	2	1	3	4	—	—	—	—	—	
McGill, Ryan	(Canada)	D	1994–1995	8	0	0	0	8	—	—	—	—	—	
McGillis, Dan	(Canada)	D	1996–1998	140	16	31	47	126	12	0	5	5	24	
McLeod, Ryan	(Canada)	C	2020–2024	219	32	43	75	40	56	7	6	13	26	
McMurchy, Tom	(Canada)	LW	1987–1988	9	4	1	5	8	—	—	—	—	—	
McSorley, Marty	(Canada)	D	1985-1988; 1998–1999	206	24	36	60	748	48	4	8	12	184	SC 1987, 1988
Mellanby, Scott	(Canada)	RW	1991–1993	149	38	44	82	344	16	2	1	3	29	
Melnyk, Larry	(Canada)	D	1983–1986	34	2	14	16	36	18	1	4	5	28	SC 1985
Messier, Mark	(Canada)	C LW	1979–1991	851	392	642	1034	1122	166	80	135	215	175	SC 1984, 1985, 1987, 1988, 1990; Conn Smythe 1984; Hart 1989–90; Pearson 1989–90; HHOF 2007 #11 retired 2007
Metcalfe, Scott	(Canada)	C	1987–1988	2	0	0	0	0	—	—	—	—	—	
Middendorf, Max	(United States)	C	1990–1991	3	1	0	1	2	—	—	—	—	—	
Mikhnov, Alexei	(Russia)	LW	2006–2007	2	0	0	0	0	—	—	—	—	—	
Millar, Craig	(Canada)	D	1996–1999	36	4	2	6	29	—	—	—	—	—	
Miller, Andrew	(United States)	RW	2014–2016	15	1	5	6	0	—	—	—	—	—	
Minard, Chris	(Canada)	LW	2009–2010	5	0	1	1	0	—	—	—	—	—	
Miner, John	(Canada)	D	1987–1988	14	2	3	5	16	—	—	—	—	—	
Mironov, Boris	(Russia)	D	1993–1999	320	42	118	160	444	24	5	11	16	43	
Moller, Mike	(Canada)	RW	1985–1987	7	2	1	3	0	—	—	—	—	—	
Moore, Barrie	(Canada)	LW	1996–1997	4	0	0	0	0	—	—	—	—	—	
Moreau, Ethan	(Canada)	LW	1998–2010	653	112	100	212	782	40	2	6	8	43	
Motin, Johan	(Sweden)	D	2009–2010	1	0	0	0	0	—	—	—	—	—	
Muir, Bryan	(Canada)	D	1995–1998	12	0	0	0	23	5	0	0	0	4	
Muni, Craig	(Canada)	D	1986–1993	493	24	87	111	492	83	0	15	15	94	SC 1987, 1988, 1990
Murdoch, Don	(Canada)	RW	1979–1981	50	15	11	26	22	3	2	0	2	0	
Murphy, Connor	(United States)	D	2025–2026	20	1	3	4	25	6	2	1	3	0	
Murphy, Joe	(Canada)	RW	1989–1992	222	69	100	169	143	53	16	29	45	42	SC 1990
Murray, Rem	(Canada)	LW	1996–2002; 2005–2006	425	73	91	164	123	62	5	12	17	18	
Murray, Ryan	(Canada)	D	2022–2023	13	0	3	3	4	—	—	—	—	—	
Musil, David	(Canada)	D	2014–2015	4	0	2	2	2	—	—	—	—	—	
Musil, Frank	(Czech Republic)	D	1997–2001	69	1	7	8	46	8	0	0	0	8	
Nachbaur, Don	(Canada)	C	1982–1983	4	0	0	0	17	2	0	0	0	7	
Napier, Mark	(Canada)	RW	1984–1987	175	41	71	112	35	28	6	9	15	7	SC 1985
Neal, James	(Canada)	LW	2019–2021	84	24	17	41	23	6	2	1	3	0	
Nedved, Petr	(Czech Republic)	LW	2003–2004; 2006–2007	35	6	14	20	14	—	—	—	—	—	
Nethery, Lance	(Canada)	C	1981–1982	3	0	2	2	2	—	—	—	—	—	
Newman, Dan	(Canada)	LW	1979–1980	10	3	1	4	0	—	—	—	—	—	
Nicholls, Bernie	(Canada)	C	1991–1993	95	28	61	89	100	16	8	11	19	25	
Niemelainen, Markus	(Finland)	D	2021–2023	43	0	1	1	8	—	—	—	—	—	
Niinimaa, Janne	(Finland)	D	1997–2003	399	34	154	188	419	26	1	5	6	22	
Nikitin, Nikita	(Russia)	D	2014–2016	53	4	7	11	20	—	—	—	—	—	
Nilsson, Kent	(Sweden)	C	1986–1987; 1994–1995	23	6	12	18	4	21	6	13	19	6	SC 1987
Nilsson, Robert	(Sweden)	RW	2006–2010	199	31	67	98	64	—	—	—	—	—	
Norton, Jeff	(United States)	D	1995–1997	92	6	27	33	58	—	—	—	—	—	
Nugent-Hopkins, Ryan	(Canada)	C	2011–2026	1031	291	513	804	355	102	25	61	86	36	
Nurse, Darnell	(Canada)	D	2014–2026	798	88	236	324	725	100	7	22	29	108	
Nygard, Joakim	(Sweden)	LW	2019–2021	42	3	6	9	12	—	—	—	—	—	
Oates, Adam	(Canada)	C	2003–2004	60	2	16	18	8	—	—	—	—	—	HHOF 2012
Odelein, Selmar	(Canada)	D	1985–1989	18	0	2	2	35	—	—	—	—	—	
Oesterle, Jordan	(United States)	D	2014–2017	25	0	6	6	0	—	—	—	—	—	
Oksiuta, Roman	(Russia)	RW	1993–1995	36	12	4	16	12	—	—	—	—	—	
Olausson, Fredrik	(Sweden)	D	1993–1996	108	9	35	44	54	—	—	—	—	—	
Oliver, David	(Canada)	RW	1994–1997	141	37	35	72	58	—	—	—	—	—	
Omark, Linus	(Sweden)	LW	2010–2014	66	8	22	30	34	—	—	—	—	—	
O'Marra, Ryan	(Canada)	C	2009–2012	31	1	6	7	17	—	—	—	—	—	
O'Sullivan, Patrick	(United States)	C	2008–2010	92	13	27	40	44	—	—	—	—	—	
Paajarvi, Magnus	(Sweden)	LW	2010–2013	163	26	32	58	34	—	—	—	—	—	
Pakarinen, Iiro	(Finland)	RW	2014–2018	134	10	13	23	18	1	0	0	0	0	
Pardy, Adam	(Canada)	D	2015–2016	9	0	3	3	6	—	—	—	—	—	
Pearson, Scott	(Canada)	LW	1993–1995	100	20	22	42	219	—	—	—	—	—	
Peca, Michael	(Canada)	C	2005–2006	71	9	14	23	56	24	6	5	11	20	
Peckham, Theo	(Canada)	D	2007–2013	160	4	13	17	388	—	—	—	—	—	
Penner, Dustin	(Canada)	RW	2007–2011	304	93	93	186	189	—	—	—	—	—	
Perlini, Brendan	(Canada)	LW	2021–2022	23	4	1	5	6	—	—	—	—	—	
Perry, Corey	(Canada)	RW	2023–2025	119	27	16	43	95	41	11	6	17	24	
Persson, Joel	(Sweden)	D	2019–2020	13	0	2	2	2	—	—	—	—	—	
Perron, David	(Canada)	LW	2013–2015	116	33	43	76	110	—	—	—	—	—	
Petersen, Toby	(United States)	C	2005–2007	64	6	9	15	4	2	1	0	1	0	
Petiot, Richard	(Canada)	D	2010–2011	2	0	0	0	2	—	—	—	—	—	
Petit, Michel	(Canada)	D	1996–1997	18	2	4	6	20	—	—	—	—	—	
Petrell, Lennart	(Finland)	C	2011–2013	95	7	11	18	49	—	—	—	—	—	
Petrovic, Alex	(Canada)	D	2018–2019	9	0	1	1	2	—	—	—	—	—	
Petry, Jeff	(United States)	D	2010–2015	295	17	57	74	139	—	—	—	—	—	
Philp, Noah	(Canada)	F	2024–2026	30	2	3	5	6	—	—	—	—	—	
Picard, Michel	(Canada)	LW	1999–2000	2	0	0	0	2	—	—	—	—	—	
Pinizzotto, Steve	(Canada)	RW	2013–2015	24	2	4	6	45	—	—	—	—	—	
Pisa, Ales	(Czech Republic)	D	2001–2003	50	1	3	4	26	—	—	—	—	—	
Pisani, Fernando	(Canada)	LW	2002–2010	402	80	73	153	190	30	15	4	19	12	
Pitkanen, Joni	(Finland)	D	2007–2008	63	8	18	26	56	—	—	—	—	—	
Pitlick, Tyler	(United States)	RW	2013–2017	58	11	3	14	10	—	—	—	—	—	
Pittis, Domenic	(Canada)	C	2000–2002	69	4	11	15	57	3	0	0	0	2	
Plante, Alex	(Canada)	D	2009–2012	10	0	2	2	15	—	—	—	—	—	
Playfair, Jim	(Canada)	D	1983–1984	2	1	1	2	2	—	—	—	—	—	
Poddubny, Walt	(Canada)	RW	1981–1982	4	0	0	0	0	—	—	—	—	—	
Podein, Shjon	(Canada)	LW	1992–1994	68	16	11	27	33	—	—	—	—	—	
Podkolzin, Vasily	(Russia)	RW	2024–2026	164	27	34	61	111	28	6	10	16	25	
Popiel, Poul	(United States)	D	1979–1980	10	0	0	0	0	—	—	—	—	—	
Poti, Tom	(United States)	D	1998–2002	285	27	78	105	209	15	0	4	4	4	
Potter, Corey	(United States)	D	2011–2014	111	7	23	30	51	—	—	—	—	—	
Potulny, Ryan	(United States)	LW	2008–2010	72	15	20	35	28	—	—	—	—	—	
Pouliot, Benoit	(Canada)	LW	2014–2017	180	41	43	84	92	13	0	0	0	4	
Pouliot, Marc	(Canada)	C	2005–2010	176	21	32	53	74	—	—	—	—	—	
Pouzar, Jaroslav	(Czechoslovakia)	LW	1982–1985; 1986–1987	186	34	48	82	135	29	6	4	10	16	SC 1984, 1985, 1987
Price, Pat	(Canada)	D	1979–1981	134	19	45	64	327	3	0	0	0	11	
Pronger, Chris	(Canada)	D	2005–2006	80	12	44	56	74	24	5	16	21	26	HHOF 2015
Puljujarvi, Jesse	(Finland)	RW	2016–2023	317	51	61	112	106	20	3	2	5	2	
Purcell, Teddy	(Canada)	RW	2014–2016	143	23	43	66	34	—	—	—	—	—	
Rattie, Ty	(Canada)	RW	2017-2019	64	9	11	20	6	—	—	—	—	—	
Reasoner, Marty	(United States)	C	2001–2006; 2006–2008	351	45	76	121	209	6	1	0	1	2	
Reddox, Liam	(Canada)	LW	2007–2011	100	6	18	24	34	—	—	—	—	—	
Redmond, Craig	(Canada)	D	1988–1989	21	3	10	13	12	—	—	—	—	—	
Regula, Alec	(United States)	D	2025–2026	29	0	3	3	35	—	—	—	—	—	
Reinhart, Griffin	(Canada)	D	2015–2017	29	0	1	1	20	1	0	1	1	0	
Reirden, Todd	(United States)	D	1998–1999	17	2	3	5	20	—	—	—	—	—	
Rice, Steven	(Canada)	RW	1991–1994	94	19	20	39	66	—	—	—	—	—	
Richardson, Luke	(Canada)	D	1991–1997	436	13	65	78	630	28	0	7	7	59	
Rieder, Tobias	(Germany)	C	2018–2019	67	0	11	11	8	—	—	—	—	—	
Riesen, Michel	(Switzerland)	RW	2000–2001	12	0	1	1	4	—	—	—	—	—	
Rita, Jani	(Finland)	LW	2001–2006	36	6	1	7	6	—	—	—	—	—	
Roberts, David	(United States)	LW	1995–1996	6	2	4	6	6	—	—	—	—	—	
Robertsson, Bert	(Sweden)	D	1999–2000	52	0	4	4	34	5	0	0	0	0	
Rodney, Bryan	(Canada)	D	2011–2012	1	0	0	0	0	—	—	—	—	—	
Rogers, Mike	(Canada)	C	1985–1986	8	1	0	1	0	—	—	—	—	—	WHA 1974–76
Roslovic, Jack	(United States)	C	2025–2026	69	21	15	36	16	6	0	1	1	2	
Roulston, Tom	(Canada)	RW	1980–1984	137	36	32	68	64	21	2	2	4	2	
Rourke, Allan	(Canada)	D	2007–2008	13	0	0	0	5	—	—	—	—	—	
Roy, Derek	(Canada)	C	2014–2015	46	11	11	22	22	—	—	—	—	—	
Roy, Mathieu	(Canada)	D	2005–2008	30	2	1	3	57	—	—	—	—	—	
Rucinsky, Martin	(Czechoslovakia)	LW	1991–1992	2	0	0	0	0	—	—	—	—	—	
Ruotsalainen, Reijo	(Finland)	D	1986–1987; 1989–1990	26	6	15	21	12	43	4	16	20	22	SC 1987, 1990
Russell, Kris	(Canada)	D	2016–2022	339	10	67	77	84	24	0	4	4	6	
Russell, Patrick	(Denmark)	RW	2018–2021	59	0	7	7	14	—	—	—	—	—	
Ryan, Derek	(United States)	C	2021–2025	261	29	31	60	56	45	2	5	7	12	
Ruzicka, Vladimir	(Czechoslovakia)	C	1989–1990	25	11	6	17	10	—	—	—	—	—	
Salmelainen, Tony	(Finland)	LW	2003–2004	13	0	1	1	4	—	—	—	—	—	
Samanski, Josh	(Germany)	F	2025–2026	24	2	2	4	6	—	—	—	—	—	
Samorukov, Dmitri	(Russia)	D	2021–2022	1	0	0	0	0	—	—	—	—	—	
Samsonov, Sergei	(Russia)	LW	2005–2006	19	5	11	16	6	24	4	11	15	14	
Sanderson, Geoff	(Canada)	LW	2007–2008	41	3	10	13	16	—	—	—	—	—	
Sandwith, Terran	(Canada)	D	1997–1998	8	0	0	0	6	—	—	—	—	—	
Sarno, Peter	(Canada)	C	2003–2004	6	1	0	1	2	—	—	—	—	—	
Satan, Miroslav	(Slovakia)	LW	1995–1997	126	35	28	63	44	—	—	—	—	—	
Savoie, Matthew	(Canada)	C	2024–2026	86	18	20	38	24	6	0	1	1	2	
Sceviour, Colton	(Canada)	C/RW	2021–2022	35	2	3	5	26	—	—	—	—	—	
Schmautz, Bobby	(Canada)	RW	1979–1980	29	8	8	16	20	—	—	—	—	—	
Schremp, Rob	(United States)	C	2006–2009	7	0	3	3	2	—	—	—	—	—	
Schultz, Justin	(Canada)	D	2012–2016	248	28	73	111	50	—	—	—	—	—	
Schultz, Nick	(Canada)	D	2011–2014	128	1	16	17	58	—	—	—	—	—	
Sekera, Andrej	(Slovakia)	D	2015–2019	221	14	63	77	42	11	1	2	3	2	
Selivanov, Alexander	(Russia)	LW	1998–2000	96	35	26	61	70	7	0	1	1	10	
Semenko, Dave	(Canada)	LW	1979–1987	454	59	77	136	981	69	6	6	12	193	WHA 1977–79; SC 1984, 1985
Semenov, Alexei	(Russia)	D	2002–2006	103	4	10	14	107	6	0	0	0	0	
Semenov, Anatoli	(Soviet Union) (Russia)	C	1989–1992	116	35	38	73	42	22	6	6	12	12	
Sestito, Tim	(United States)	C	2008–2009	1	0	0	0	0	—	—	—	—	—	
Shaw, David	(Canada)	D	1991–1992	12	1	1	2	8	—	—	—	—	—	
Sheahan, Riley	(Canada)	C	2019–2020	66	8	7	15	6	4	0	0	0	2	
Sherven, Gord	(Canada)	C	1983–1985; 1985–1986	44	11	8	19	14	—	—	—	—	—	
Shore, Devin	(Canada)	C	2020–2023	134	11	18	29	20	2	0	1	1	0	
Shudra, Ron	(Canada)	D	1987–1988	10	0	5	5	6	—	—	—	—	—	
Siltanen, Risto	(Finland)	D	1979–1982	206	38	113	151	106	16	5	2	7	20	WHA 1978–79
Sim, Trevor	(Canada)	C	1989–1990	3	0	1	1	2	—	—	—	—	—	
Simpson, Craig	(Canada)	LW	1987–1993	419	185	180	365	485	67	36	32	68	56	
Simpson, Dillon	(Canada)	D	2016–2017	3	0	0	0	2	—	—	—	—	—	
Skinner, Jeff	(Canada)	LW/C	2024–2025	72	16	13	29	26	5	1	1	2	0	
Slegr, Jiri	(Czech Republic)	D	1994–1996	69	5	18	23	88	—	—	—	—	—	
Slepyshev, Anton	(Russia)	LW	2015–2018	102	10	13	23	14	12	3	0	3	4	
Smid, Ladislav	(Czech Republic)	D	2006–2014	474	11	54	65	391	—	—	—	—	—	
Smith, Dan	(Canada)	D	2005–2006	7	0	0	0	7	—	—	—	—	—	
Smith, Doug	(Canada)	C	1988–1989	19	1	1	2	9	—	—	—	—	—	
Smith, Geoff	(Canada)	D	1989–1994	306	11	56	67	192	12	0	1	1	6	SC 1990
Smith, Jason	(Canada)	D	1998–2007	542	31	82	113	643	45	1	8	9	49	
Stastney, Spencer	(United States)	D	2025–2026	36	1	0	1	10	—	—	—	—	—	
Stecher, Troy	(Canada)	D	2023–2026	79	3	6	9	43	8	0	0	0	2	
Smith, Steve	(Canada)	D	1984–1991	385	46	172	218	1080	87	10	29	39	216	SC 1987, 1988, 1990
Smithson, Jerred	(Canada)	C	2012–2013	10	1	0	1	2	—	—	—	—	—	
Smyth, Ryan	(Canada)	LW	1994–2007; 2011–2014	971	296	335	631	773	68	22	21	43	76	
Solheim, Ken	(Canada)	LW	1985–1986	6	1	0	1	5	—	—	—	—	—	
Sommer, Roy	(United States)	C	1980–1981	3	1	0	1	7	—	—	—	—	—	
Souray, Sheldon	(Canada)	D	2007–2010	144	30	46	76	199	—	—	—	—	—	
Spacek, Jaroslav	(Czech Republic)	D	2005–2006	31	5	14	19	24	24	3	11	14	24	
Spooner, Ryan	(Canada)	C	2018–2019	25	2	1	3	2	—	—	—	—	—	
Srsen, Tomas	(Canada)	LW	1990–1991	2	0	0	0	0	—	—	—	—	—	
Staios, Steve	(Canada)	D	2001–2010	573	35	111	146	743	30	1	5	6	32	
Stajduhar, Nick	(Canada)	D	1995–1996	2	0	0	0	4	—	—	—	—	—	
Stapleton, Mike	(Canada)	C	1993–1995	69	11	20	31	49	—	—	—	—	—	
Stastny, Yan	(United States)	C	2005–2006	3	0	0	0	0	—	—	—	—	—	
Stillman, Riley	(Canada)	D	2025–2026	4	0	0	0	0	—	—	—	—	—	
Stoll, Jarret	(Canada)	C	2002–2008	286	59	106	165	238	24	4	6	10	24	
Stone, Ryan	(Canada)	C	2009–2010	27	0	6	6	48	—	—	—	—	—	
Stortini, Zack	(Canada)	C	2006–2011	256	14	27	41	718	—	—	—	—	—	
Strome, Ryan	(Canada)	C	2017–2019	100	14	22	36	47	—	—	—	—	—	
Strudwick, Jason	(Canada)	D	2008–2011	186	2	15	17	133	—	—	—	—	—	
Strueby, Todd	(Canada)	LW	1981–1984	5	0	1	1	2	—	—	—	—	—	
Summanen, Raimo	(Finland)	LW	1983–1987	132	30	33	63	33	10	2	5	7	0	
Sutton, Andy	(Canada)	D	2011–2012	52	3	7	10	80	—	—	—	—	—	
Sutton, Ken	(Canada)	D	1994–1996	44	3	9	12	51	—	—	—	—	—	
Swanson, Brian	(United States)	C	2000–2003	68	4	12	16	16	—	—	—	—	—	
Sykora, Petr	(Czech Republic)	C	2006–2007	82	22	31	53	40	—	—	—	—	—	
Syvret, Danny	(Canada)	D	2005–2007	26	0	1	1	12	—	—	—	—	—	
Tarnstrom, Dick	(Sweden)	D	2005–2006	22	1	3	4	24	12	0	2	2	10	
Teubert, Colten	(Canada)	D	2011–2012	24	0	1	1	25	—	—	—	—	—	
Thoresen, Patrick	(Norway)	LW	2006–2007	68	4	12	16	52	—	—	—	—	—	
Thornton, Scott	(Canada)	C	1991–1996	209	23	30	53	385	1	0	0	0	0	
Tidey, Alec	(Canada)	RW	1979–1980	5	0	0	0	8	—	—	—	—	—	
Tikkanen, Esa	(Finland)	LW	1984–1993	522	178	258	436	759	114	51	46	97	173	SC 1985, 1987, 1988, 1990
Titov, German	(Russia)	C	1999–2000	7	0	4	4	4	5	1	1	2	0	
Tjarnqvist, Daniel	(Sweden)	D	2006–2007	37	3	12	15	30	—	—	—	—	—	
Toal, Mike	(Canada)	C	1979–1980	3	0	0	0	0	—	—	—	—	—	
Todd, Kevin	(Canada)	C	1992–1993	25	4	9	13	10	—	—	—	—	—	
Tomasek, David	(Czech Republic)	F	2025–2026	22	3	2	5	10	—	—	—	—	—	
Torres, Raffi	(Canada)	LW	2003–2008	276	67	53	120	239	22	4	7	11	16	
Tuomainen, Marko	(Finland)	RW	1994–1995	4	0	0	0	0	—	—	—	—	—	
Turris, Kyle	(Canada)	C	2020–2022	50	3	6	9	14	—	—	—	—	—	
Ulanov, Igor	(Russia)	D	1999–2001; 2003–2006	160	11	42	53	157	11	0	0	0	10	
Unger, Garry	(Canada)	C	1980–1983	75	9	13	22	83	12	1	0	1	25	
Van Allen, Shaun	(Canada)	C	1990–1993	23	1	4	5	6	—	—	—	—	—	
Van Dorp, Wayne	(Canada)	LW	1986–1987	3	0	0	0	25	3	0	0	0	2	
Vandermeer, Jim	(Canada)	D	2010–2011	62	2	12	14	74	—	—	—	—	—	
VandeVelde, Chris	(United States)	C	2010–2013	28	1	2	3	18	—	—	—	—	—	
Visnovsky, Lubomir	(Slovakia)	D	2008–2010	107	18	45	63	46	—	—	—	—	—	
Vorobiev, Vladimir	(Russia)	RW	1998–1999	2	2	0	2	2	1	0	0	0	0	
Vujtek, Vladimir	(Czech Republic)	RW	1992–1994	70	5	25	30	22	—	—	—	—	—	
Vyazmikin, Igor	(Soviet Union)	LW	1990–1991	4	1	0	1	0	—	—	—	—	—	
Walker, Nathan	(Australia)	LW	2017–2018	2	0	0	0	2	—	—	—	—	—	
Walman, Jake	(Canada)	D	2024–2026	68	9	19	28	16	28	2	12	14	20	
Ware, Mike	(Canada)	RW	1988–1990	5	0	1	1	15	—	—	—	—	—	
Watt, Mike	(Canada)	LW	1997–1998	14	1	2	3	4	—	—	—	—	—	
Weight, Doug	(United States)	C	1992–2001	588	157	420	577	527	39	10	23	33	58	
Weir, Stan	(Canada)	C	1979–1982	200	48	66	114	93	8	0	0	0	4	WHA 1978–79
Werenka, Brad	(Canada)	D	1992–1994	42	5	7	12	38	—	—	—	—	—	
White, Peter	(Canada)	C	1993–1996	61	10	12	22	2	—	—	—	—	—	
Whitney, Ray	(Canada)	LW	1997–1998	9	1	3	4	0	—	—	—	—	—	
Whitney, Ryan	(United States)	D	2009–2013	139	12	59	71	94	—	—	—	—	—	
Wideman, Chris	(United States)	D	2018–2019	5	0	2	2	4	—	—	—	—	—	
Wiemer, Jim	(Canada)	D	1987–1988	12	1	2	3	15	2	0	0	0	2	
Winchester, Brad	(United States)	LW	2005–2007	78	4	6	10	107	10	1	2	3	4	
Wright, Tyler	(Canada)	C	1992–1996	41	3	1	4	70	—	—	—	—	—	
Yakimov, Bogdan	(Russia)	C	2014–2015	1	0	0	0	0	—	—	—	—	—	
Yakupov, Nail	(Russia)	RW	2012–2016	252	50	61	111	102	—	—	—	—	—	
Yamamoto, Kailer	(United States)	RW	2017–2023	244	50	68	118	106	34	3	9	12	36	
York, Mike	(United States)	C	2001–2004	144	40	57	97	25	6	0	2	2	2	
Young, Bryan	(Canada)	D	2006–2008	15	0	0	0	10	—	—	—	—	—	
Zavisha, Brad	(Canada)	LW	1993–1994	2	0	0	0	0	—	—	—	—	—	
Zelepukin, Valeri	(Russia)	LW	1997–1998	33	2	10	12	57	8	1	2	3	2	
Zholtok, Sergei	(Latvia)	C	2000–2001	37	4	16	20	22	3	0	0	0	0	
Zykov, Valentin	(Russia)	LW	2018–2019	5	0	0	0	2	—	—	—	—	—	

== See also ==
- List of Edmonton Oilers (WHA) players
