= Matthieu Descoteaux =

Canadian ice hockey player (born 1977)

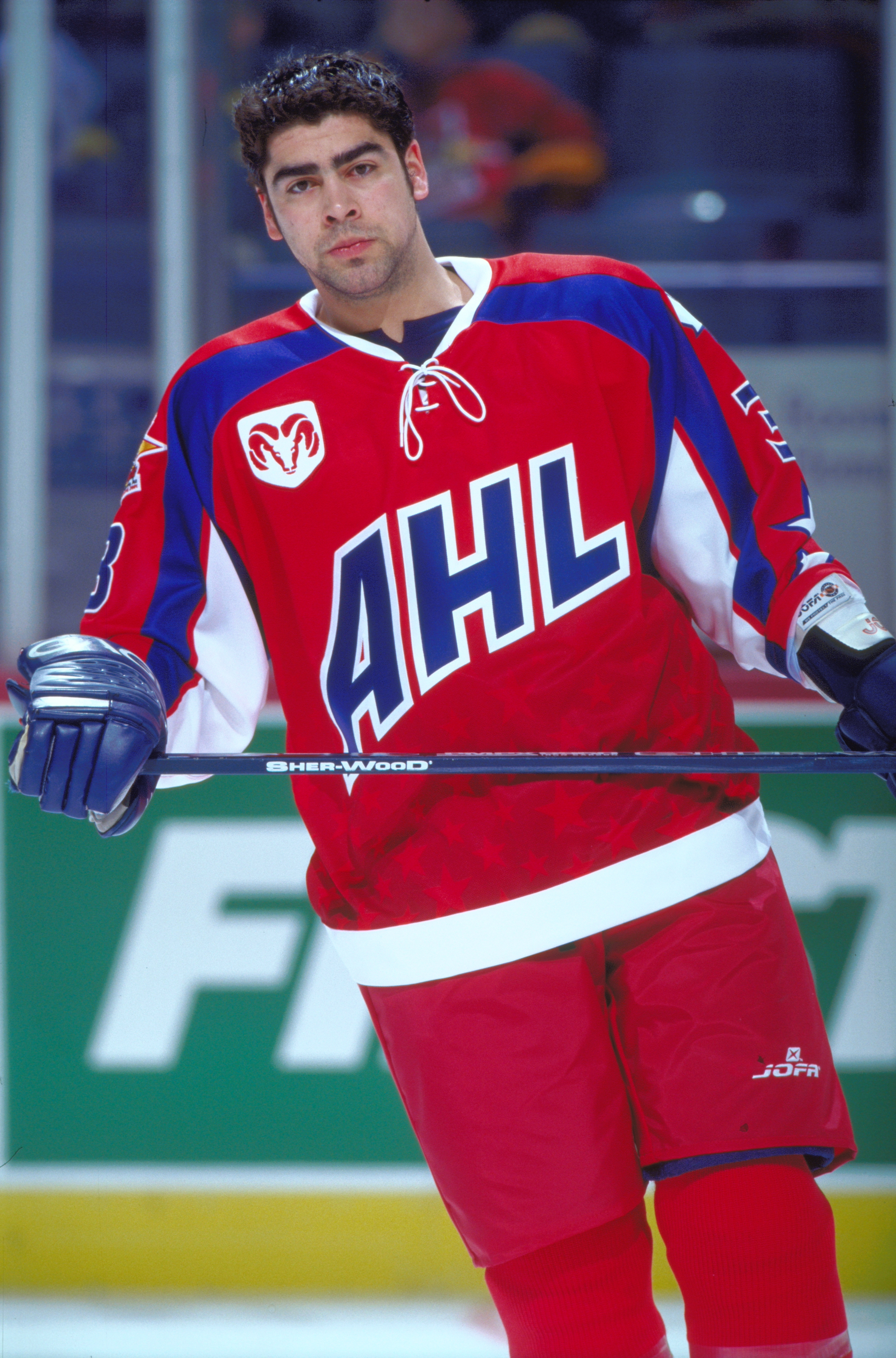
- Born: September 23, 1977 (age 48) Pierreville, Quebec, Canada
- Height: 6 ft 4 in (193 cm)
- Weight: 208 lb (94 kg; 14 st 12 lb)
- Position: Defence
- Shot: Left
- Played for: Montreal Canadiens; Tappara; HC Asiago
- NHL draft: 19th Overall, 1996; Edmonton Oilers
- Playing career: 1997–2009

Matthieu Andre Jean Marc Luc Descoteaux (born September 23, 1977) is a Canadian former professional ice hockey defenceman who played in the National Hockey League (NHL) with the Montreal Canadiens.

== Playing career ==
As a youth, Descoteaux played in the 1991 Quebec International Pee-Wee Hockey Tournament with a minor ice hockey team from Francheville, Quebec.

Descoteaux was selected in the first round of the 1996 NHL entry draft, 19th overall, by the Edmonton Oilers. On March 9, 2000, he was traded from Edmonton to Montreal with Christian Laflamme in exchange for Igor Ulanov and Alain Nasreddine. He played five games in the National Hockey League with the Montreal Canadiens.

He spent the majority of his career in the American Hockey League, and also played in Finland, Italy and Germany. He last played in the Ligue Nord-Americaine de Hockey for Sainte-Marie Poutrelles Delta.

== Career statistics ==
| | | | Regular season | | | | | Playoffs |
| Season | Team | League | GP | G | A | Pts | PIM | GP | G | A | Pts | PIM |
|---|---|---|---|---|---|---|---|---|---|---|---|---|
| 1993–94 | Trois-Rivières Estacades | QMAAA | 43 | 2 | 5 | 555 fdf | 26 | 4 | 0 | 1 | 1 | 0 |
| 1994–95 | Shawinigan Cataractes | QMJHL | 50 | 3 | 2 | 5 | 28 | 15 | 1 | 1 | 2 | 19 |
| 1995–96 | Shawinigan Cataractes | QMJHL | 69 | 2 | 13 | 15 | 129 | 6 | 0 | 0 | 0 | 6 |
| 1996–97 | Shawinigan Cataractes | QMJHL | 38 | 6 | 18 | 24 | 103 | — | — | — | — | — |
| 1996–97 | Hull Olympiques | QMJHL | 32 | 6 | 19 | 25 | 34 | 14 | 1 | 8 | 9 | 29 |
| 1997–98 | Hamilton Bulldogs | AHL | 67 | 2 | 8 | 10 | 70 | 2 | 0 | 0 | 0 | 0 |
| 1998–99 | Hamilton Bulldogs | AHL | 74 | 6 | 12 | 18 | 49 | 4 | 0 | 0 | 0 | 0 |
| 1999–2000 | Hamilton Bulldogs | AHL | 49 | 5 | 7 | 12 | 29 | — | — | — | — | — |
| 1999–2000 | Quebec Citadelles | AHL | 12 | 0 | 6 | 6 | 6 | 2 | 0 | 1 | 1 | 0 |
| 2000–01 | Quebec Citadelles | AHL | 73 | 16 | 27 | 43 | 38 | 7 | 0 | 3 | 3 | 4 |
| 2000–01 | Montreal Canadiens | NHL | 5 | 1 | 1 | 2 | 4 | — | — | — | — | — |
| 2001–02 | Quebec Citadelles | AHL | 65 | 6 | 14 | 20 | 34 | 3 | 1 | 2 | 3 | 0 |
| 2002–03 | Utah Grizzlies | AHL | 48 | 3 | 3 | 6 | 47 | — | — | — | — | — |
| 2003–04 | Tappara | SM-l | 6 | 0 | 0 | 0 | 4 | — | — | — | — | — |
| 2003–04 | Sport | Mestis | 6 | 0 | 1 | 1 | 35 | — | — | — | — | — |
| 2003–04 | HC Asiago | ITA | 5 | 1 | 0 | 1 | 12 | — | — | — | — | — |
| 2004–05 | Kansas City Outlaws | UHL | 48 | 11 | 16 | 27 | 24 | — | — | — | — | — |
| 2005–06 | Wölfe Freiburg | 2.GBun | 49 | 7 | 18 | 25 | 80 | — | — | — | — | — |
| 2006–07 | Quebec RadioX | LNAH | 30 | 6 | 22 | 28 | 16 | 4 | 0 | 1 | 1 | 0 |
| 2007–08 | Thetford Mines Isothermic | LNAH | 48 | 6 | 13 | 19 | 41 | — | — | — | — | — |
| 2008–09 | Thetford Mines Isothermic | LNAH | 19 | 1 | 3 | 4 | 16 | — | — | — | — | — |
| 2008–09 | Sainte-Marie Poutrelles Delta | LNAH | 1 | 0 | 0 | 0 | 0 | — | — | — | — | — |
| AHL totals | | | 388 | 38 | 77 | 115 | 273 | 18 | 1 | 6 | 7 | 4 |
| NHL totals | | | 5 | 1 | 1 | 2 | 4 | — | — | — | — | — |

== Awards and honours ==
| Award | Year |
|---|---|
CHL
| Memorial Cup (Hull Olympiques) | 1997 |
AHL
| All-Star Game | 2001 |

Awards and achievements
| Preceded by Boyd Devereaux | Edmonton Oilers first-round draft pick 1996 (second of two) | Succeeded by Michel Riesen |
