= Michel Riesen =

Swiss ice hockey player (born 1979)

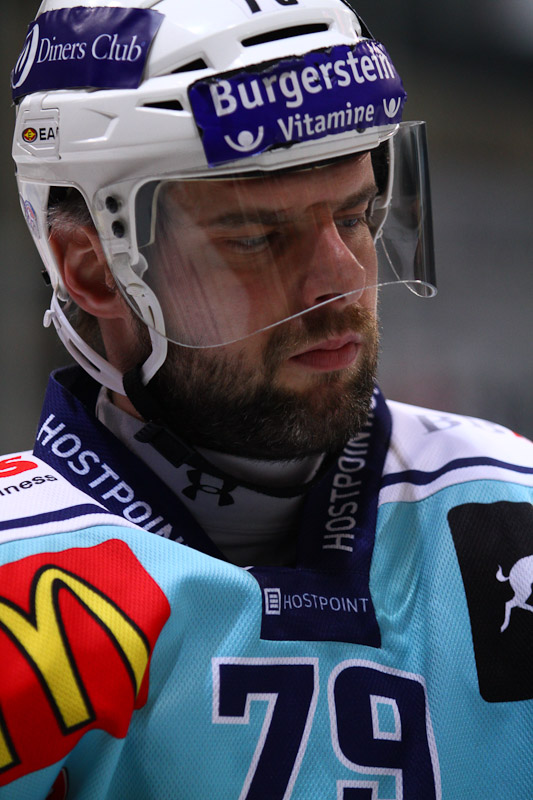
- Riesen in 2011
- Born: April 11, 1979 (age 47) Oberbalm, Switzerland
- Height: 6 ft 2 in (188 cm)
- Weight: 185 lb (84 kg; 13 st 3 lb)
- Position: Right wing
- Shot: Right
- Played for: Edmonton Oilers; EHC Biel; HC Davos; Rapperswil-Jona Lakers
- National team: Switzerland
- NHL draft: 14th overall, 1997; Edmonton Oilers
- Playing career: 1994–2014

Michel Riesen (born April 11, 1979) is a Swiss former professional ice hockey winger. Most of his career, which lasted from 1994 to 2014, was spent in the Swiss Nationalliga A, though he also played 12 games in the National Hockey League (NHL) with the Edmonton Oilers during the 2000–01 season. Internationally Riesen played for the Swiss national team in several junior tournaments and three World Championships. After retiring he turned to coaching and has worked at the junior level in Switzerland since 2015.

== Playing career ==
He was selected in the first round of the 1997 NHL entry draft, 14th overall, by the Edmonton Oilers. At the time he was the highest-drafted Swiss player in NHL history.

Riesen was twice a member of Switzerland's World Junior team (1997, 1998) and a member of its World Championship team (1998). Riesen made his North American debut on the AHL's Hamilton Bulldogs team in 1998–99. Riesen played three seasons in Hamilton with his best season being in 1999–00 when he registered 60 points (29G-31A).

Riesen made his NHL debut in the 2000–01 season with the Oilers, playing in 12 games in what would be his only NHL season. On July 1, 2001, Riesen was traded from the Oilers, along with Doug Weight, to the St. Louis Blues for Marty Reasoner, Jochen Hecht and Jan Horacek. Riesen never played for the Blues, opting to head back to Switzerland for the 2001–02 season to rejoin HC Davos.

In the 2006-07 season, Riesen was the top goal scorer in the NLA with 37 goals.

== Career statistics ==
=== Regular season and playoffs ===
			Regular season					Playoffs
Season	Team	League	GP	G	A	Pts	PIM	GP	G	A	Pts	PIM
1994–95	EHC Biel	SUI-U20	—	—	—	—	—	—	—	—	—	—
1994–95	EHC Biel	NDA	12	0	2	2	0	—	—	—	—	—
1995–96	EHC Biel	SUI U20	—	—	—	—	—	—	—	—	—	—
1995–96	EHC Biel	NLB	34	9	6	15	2	3	1	0	1	0
1996–97	EHC Biel	NLB	38	16	16	32	49	—	—	—	—	—
1997–98	HC Davos	NDA	32	16	9	25	8	18	5	5	10	4
1997–98	EHC St. Moritz	SUI-3	1	1	0	1	—	—	—	—	—	—
1998–99	Hamilton Bulldogs	AHL	60	6	17	23	6	3	0	0	0	0
1999–00	Hamilton Bulldogs	AHL	73	29	31	60	20	10	3	5	8	4
2000–01	Edmonton Oilers	NHL	12	0	1	1	4	—	—	—	—	—
2000–01	Hamilton Bulldogs	AHL	69	26	28	54	14	—	—	—	—	—
2001–02	HC Davos	NLA	35	12	12	24	28	16	7	8	15	52
2002–03	HC Davos	NLA	44	17	17	34	30	16	3	6	9	8
2003–04	HC Davos	NLA	47	16	13	29	14	6	1	2	3	4
2004–05	HC Davos	NLA	44	18	14	32	8	15	3	3	6	6
2005–06	HC Davos	NLA	39	17	12	29	18	15	9	3	12	8
2006–07	HC Davos	NLA	44	37	14	51	70	15	5	4	9	37
2007–08	HC Davos	NLA	39	13	17	30	18	11	6	3	9	8
2008–09	HC Davos	NLA	50	24	17	41	32	21	9	3	12	4
2009–10	Rapperswil–Jona Lakers	NLA	41	11	18	29	12	—	—	—	—	—
2010–11	Rapperswil–Jona Lakers	NLA	46	9	10	19	16	—	—	—	—	—
2011–12	Rapperswil–Jona Lakers	NLA	35	7	11	18	4	—	—	—	—	—
2012–13	Rapperswil–Jona Lakers	NLA	47	13	10	23	30	—	—	—	—	—
2013–14	EHC Basel	NLB	33	7	9	16	8	5	2	1	3	0
NDA/NLA totals			555	210	176	386	288	133	48	37	85	131
NHL totals			12	0	1	1	4	—	—	—	—	—

=== International ===
Year	Team	Event	GP	G	A	Pts	PIM
1994	Switzerland	EJC	5	1	0	1	0
1995	Switzerland	EJC	5	3	1	4	2
1996	Switzerland	WJC	6	1	0	1	0
1997	Switzerland	WJC	6	4	1	5	8
1997	Switzerland	EJC	6	6	1	7	2
1998	Switzerland	WJC	7	4	1	5	0
1998	Switzerland	WC	2	0	1	1	0
1999	Switzerland	WJC	6	0	4	4	4
2000	Switzerland	WC	1	1	0	1	2
2001	Switzerland	WC	6	3	1	4	0
Junior totals			41	19	8	27	16
Senior totals			9	4	2	6	2

Preceded by Matthieu Descoteaux	Edmonton Oilers first-round draft pick 1997	Succeeded by Michael Henrich
