= Dean McAmmond =

Canadian ice hockey player (born 1973)

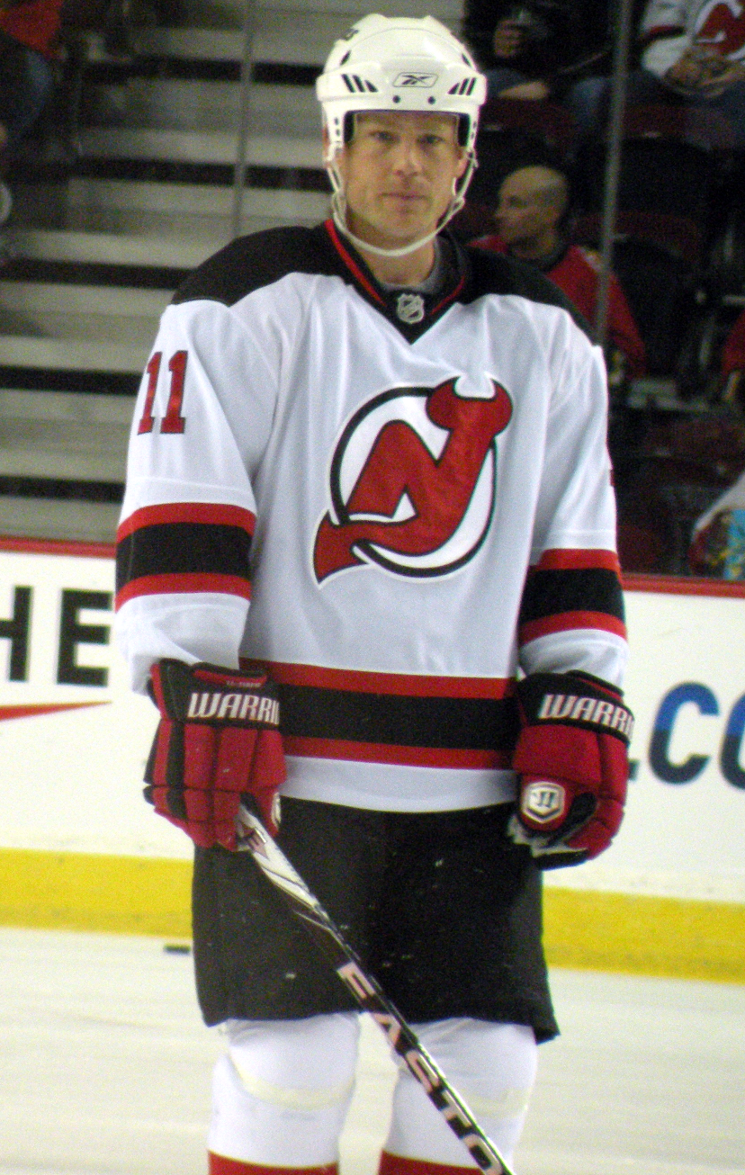
- McAmmond with the New Jersey Devils in 2010
- Born: June 15, 1973 (age 53) Grande Cache, Alberta, Canada
- Height: 5 ft 11 in (180 cm)
- Weight: 196 lb (89 kg; 14 st 0 lb)
- Position: Centre
- Shot: Left
- Played for: Edmonton Oilers; Chicago Blackhawks; Philadelphia Flyers; Calgary Flames; Colorado Avalanche; St. Louis Blues; Ottawa Senators; New York Islanders; New Jersey Devils
- National team: Canada
- NHL draft: 22nd overall, 1991; Chicago Blackhawks
- Playing career: 1992–2010

Dean W. McAmmond (born June 15, 1973) is a Canadian former professional ice hockey player. McAmmond played in the National Hockey League (NHL) from 1992 to 2010 for nine teams.

== Pre-NHL career ==
McAmmond played four seasons in the Western Hockey League with the Prince Albert Raiders and the Swift Current Broncos. During the 1992–93 WHL playoffs, he scored a league high 16 goals in 17 playoff games to help lead the Swift Current Broncos to the league championship. He would net 431 total points while with the Raiders. In 1993, McAmmond captured a gold medal as a member of Team Canada at the IIHF World Junior Championships in Sweden.

== NHL career ==
=== Early years ===
A first-round selection by the Chicago Blackhawks in the 1991 NHL entry draft (22nd overall), McAmmond made his NHL debut with the Blackhawks during the 1991–92 season. On February 24, 1993, Chicago traded McAmmond, along with Igor Kravchuk, to the Edmonton Oilers for Joe Murphy. McAmmond spent the better part of six seasons in the Oilers organization from 1993 to 1998, including two stints with Edmonton's AHL affiliate Cape Breton Oilers. During his time in Edmonton, McAmmond also represented his native Canada at the 1996 World Championships in Austria, winning a silver medal. After dressing in over 300 games with the Oilers, his longest tenure with any NHL club, Edmonton sent the Alberta native back to Chicago with Jonas Elofsson and Boris Mironov on March 20, 1999 to the Blackhawks for Ethan Moreau, Chad Kilger, Daniel Cleary and Christian Laflamme. McAmmond once again represented Canada during the 2000 World Championships in Russia.

=== Calgary and Colorado ===
After playing the better part of two seasons in Chicago, the Blackhawks traded McAmmond again on March 13, 2001 to the Philadelphia Flyers for a third-round selection in the 2001 NHL entry draft. After finishing the season in Philadelphia, the Flyers traded McAmmond during the offseason to the Calgary Flames for a fourth-round selection in the 2002 NHL entry draft. McAmmond then signed a multi-year contract with the Flames in August, 2001.

Upon returning to Alberta, McAmmond enjoyed a career year with the Flames during the 2001–02 season, setting personal highs for goals (21) and points (51) in 73 games. On October 1, 2002, prior to the beginning of the 2002–03 NHL season, Calgary traded McAmmond with Jeff Shantz and Derek Morris to the Colorado Avalanche for Stéphane Yelle and Chris Drury. In the midst of an injury-filled season with the Avalanche, Calgary re-acquired McAmmond from Colorado on March 11, 2003 for a fifth-round selection in the 2003 NHL entry draft. McAmmond, however, couldn't play a game for the Flames for the rest of the season since the deal violated a rule at the time prohibiting teams from trading a player prior to the waiver draft and reacquiring them later in the year. McAmmond suffered another setback during the 2003–04 season with Calgary, sustaining a back injury and missing the remaining 13 games of the regular season and every game of the 2004 Stanley Cup Playoffs during Calgary's run to game seven of the 2004 Stanley Cup Finals.

=== Later years ===
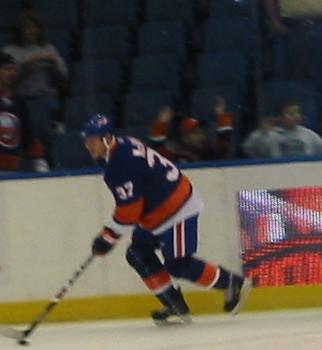
McAmmond with the Islanders

During the 2004–05 NHL lockout, McAmmond played for the American Hockey League's Albany River Rats, leading the team in scoring with 61 points (19 goals, 42 assists) in 79 games. When NHL play resumed, and as an unrestricted free agent, McAmmond signed a contract to play with the St. Louis Blues for the 2005-2006 season, where he tallied 15 goals and 37 points in 78 games. Following the season, McAmmond, again a free agent signed with the Ottawa Senators 2006-2007 NHL season.

In Ottawa, McAmmond emerged as a dependable role player on a skilled Senator team. In the 2007 Senators Super Skills competition, McAmmond led the Senators as the fastest skater, and later, on March 30, 2007, he played his 800th career NHL game in a winning effort against the Montreal Canadiens. McAmmond recorded a Gordie Howe hat trick on April 15, 2007, in a playoff game against the Pittsburgh Penguins, scoring a goal, adding an assist, and winning a fight with Pittsburgh's Maxime Talbot. The Senators rolled into the 2007 Stanley Cup Finals, only to lose the series in five games to the Anaheim Ducks. In game three, after scoring what turned out to be the game-winning goal (and the only win in the series) for Ottawa, McAmmond was the victim of a controversial elbow to the head from defenceman Chris Pronger. He left the ice with assistance and did not return for games four or five, suffering from a concussion.

Just a few months after re-signing a multi-year contract with Ottawa, McAmmond suffered another concussion during a preseason game on September 25, 2007 from a hit to the head by Philadelphia's Steve Downie. McAmmond, knocked unconscious by the hit, was carried off the ice by stretcher. Downie, who received a match penalty for the hit, was suspended for 20 games by the NHL for the incident. After missing 10 games from the hit, McAmmond returned to the Senator line-up in November and finished the 2007-2008 season without any further injuries.

In the midst of the 2008-2009 NHL Season that saw McAmmond miss several games due to pneumonia, Ottawa sent him to the New York Islanders along with a first-round selection (acquired from San Jose) in the 2009 NHL entry draft in exchange for Mike Comrie and Chris Campoli on February 20, 2009. McAmmond, who grew up as an Islanders fan in Alberta, enjoyed a short stint on Long Island before becoming an unrestricted free agent at season's end.

After going uncontacted by an NHL team over the 2009 summer, the New Jersey Devils came calling and on October 20, McAmmond signed an AHL contract to play with the Lowell Devils, returning for a second stint with the New Jersey Devils minor league affiliate. On November 6, after suffering numerous injuries to the team, the Devils and McAmmond agreed to a two-way contract which brought him up to the Devils roster. Devils coach Jacques Lemaire used McAmmond as a defensive specialist, killing penalties, while also seeing time on the power play.

McAmmond's last involvement in the NHL came with the attempt to make a return to the New York Islanders roster for the 2010–11 season. After accepting an invitation to training camp he was subsequently released at its conclusion. McAmmond finished only four appearances shy of 1,000 career NHL games.

== Career statistics ==
=== Regular season and playoffs ===
			Regular season					Playoffs
Season	Team	League	GP	G	A	Pts	PIM	GP	G	A	Pts	PIM
1989–90	Prince Albert Raiders	WHL	53	11	11	22	49	14	2	3	5	18
1990–91	Prince Albert Raiders	WHL	71	33	35	68	108	2	0	1	1	6
1991–92	Prince Albert Raiders	WHL	63	37	54	91	189	10	12	11	23	26
1991–92	Chicago Blackhawks	NHL	5	0	2	2	0	3	0	0	0	2
1992–93	Prince Albert Raiders	WHL	30	19	29	48	44	—	—	—	—	—
1992–93	Swift Current Broncos	WHL	18	10	13	23	29	17	16	19	35	20
1993–94	Cape Breton Oilers	AHL	28	9	12	21	38	—	—	—	—	—
1993–94	Edmonton Oilers	NHL	45	6	21	27	16	—	—	—	—	—
1994–95	Edmonton Oilers	NHL	6	0	0	0	0	—	—	—	—	—
1995–96	Cape Breton Oilers	AHL	22	9	15	24	55	—	—	—	—	—
1995–96	Edmonton Oilers	NHL	53	15	15	30	23	—	—	—	—	—
1996–97	Edmonton Oilers	NHL	57	12	17	29	28	—	—	—	—	—
1997–98	Edmonton Oilers	NHL	77	19	31	50	46	12	1	4	5	12
1998–99	Edmonton Oilers	NHL	65	9	16	25	36	—	—	—	—	—
1998–99	Chicago Blackhawks	NHL	12	1	4	5	2	—	—	—	—	—
1999–2000	Chicago Blackhawks	NHL	76	14	18	32	72	—	—	—	—	—
2000–01	Chicago Blackhawks	NHL	61	10	16	26	43	—	—	—	—	—
2000–01	Philadelphia Flyers	NHL	10	1	1	2	0	4	0	0	0	2
2001–02	Calgary Flames	NHL	73	21	30	51	60	—	—	—	—	—
2002–03	Colorado Avalanche	NHL	41	10	8	18	10	—	—	—	—	—
2003–04	Calgary Flames	NHL	64	17	13	30	18	—	—	—	—	—
2004–05	Albany River Rats	AHL	79	19	42	61	72	—	—	—	—	—
2005–06	St. Louis Blues	NHL	78	15	22	37	32	—	—	—	—	—
2006–07	Ottawa Senators	NHL	81	14	15	29	28	18	5	3	8	11
2007–08	Ottawa Senators	NHL	68	9	13	22	12	4	0	0	0	4
2008–09	Ottawa Senators	NHL	44	3	4	7	16	—	—	—	—	—
2008–09	New York Islanders	NHL	18	2	7	9	8	—	—	—	—	—
2009–10	Lowell Devils	AHL	6	1	2	3	6	—	—	—	—	—
2009–10	New Jersey Devils	NHL	62	8	9	17	40	5	0	0	0	4
NHL totals			996	186	262	448	490	46	6	7	13	35

=== International ===
Medal record

Representing Canada

Ice hockey

World Championships
Silver medal – second place	1996 Austria	

World Junior Championships
Gold medal – first place	1993 Sweden	

Year	Team	Event	Result	GP	G	A	Pts	PIM
1993	Canada	WJC	1st place, gold medalist(s)	7	0	1	1	12
1996	Canada	WC	2nd place, silver medalist(s)	8	0	2	2	2
2000	Canada	WC	4th	8	0	0	0	0
Junior totals				7	0	1	1	12
Senior totals				16	0	2	2	2

== Awards and honours ==
Award	Year
WHL
Best Plus/Minus (+56)	1992
CHL Plus/Minus Award	1992

Awards and achievements
Preceded by Karl Dykhuis	Chicago Blackhawks first-round draft pick 1991	Succeeded by Sergei Krivokrasov
