= Igor Ulanov =

Russian ice hockey player

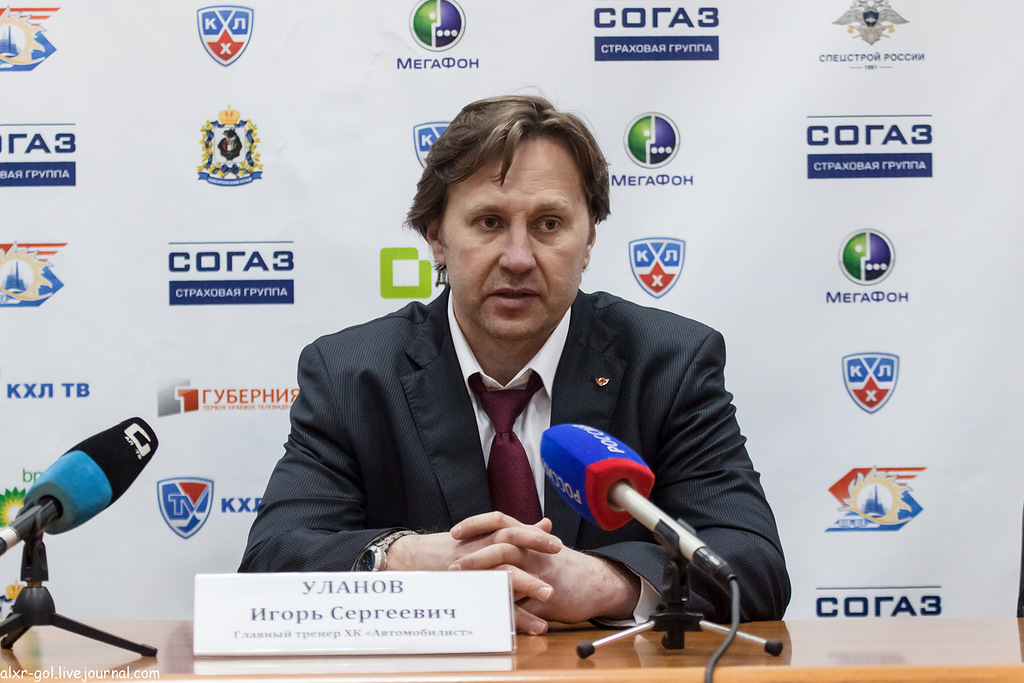
- Ulanov in 2013
- Born: 1 October 1969 (age 56) Krasnokamsk, Russian SFSR, Soviet Union
- Height: 6 ft 3 in (191 cm)
- Weight: 220 lb (100 kg; 15 st 10 lb)
- Position: Defence
- Shot: Left
- Played for: Khimik Voskresensk; Winnipeg Jets; Washington Capitals; Chicago Blackhawks; Tampa Bay Lightning; Montreal Canadiens; Edmonton Oilers; New York Rangers; Florida Panthers; Lokomotiv Yaroslavl; HC Dynamo Minsk
- National team: Russia
- NHL draft: 203rd overall, 1991; Winnipeg Jets
- Playing career: 1985–2009

Igor Sergeevich Ulanov (Russian: И́горь Серге́евич Ула́нов; born 1 October 1969) is a Russian former professional ice hockey defenceman who played 14 seasons in the National Hockey League (NHL). Ulanov was drafted by the Winnipeg Jets in the tenth round of the 1991 NHL entry draft.

== Playing career ==
He has played for the Jets, Washington Capitals, Chicago Blackhawks, Tampa Bay Lightning, Montreal Canadiens, Edmonton Oilers, New York Rangers and the Florida Panthers, as well as European and American Hockey League clubs.

At the 2002 trade deadline, he was part of a package sent to the Florida Panthers for Pavel Bure. Ulanov returned to Edmonton for the 2003–04 season and remained a member of the Oilers through the 2005–06 season. Ulanov has also represented Russia at the 1994 World Championships and the 1996 World Cup of Hockey. He was playing for Lokomotiv Yaroslavl of the Russian Super League, until late January 2008. He then signed with HC Dinamo Minsk of the Kontinental Hockey League.

== Career statistics ==
=== Regular season and playoffs ===
			Regular season					Playoffs
Season	Team	League	GP	G	A	Pts	PIM	GP	G	A	Pts	PIM
1985–86	Molot Perm	USSR.2	6	0	0	0	2	—	—	—	—	—
1986–87	Molot Perm	USSR.2	1	0	0	0	0	—	—	—	—	—
1987–88	Molot Perm	USSR.2	67	4	1	5	76	—	—	—	—	—
1988–89	SKA Sverdlovsk	USSR.2	63	4	5	9	77	—	—	—	—	—
1989–90	SKA Sverdlovsk	USSR.2	57	11	8	19	155	—	—	—	—	—
1990–91	Khimik Voskresensk	USSR	41	2	2	4	52	—	—	—	—	—
1991–92	Khimik Voskresensk	CIS	27	1	4	5	24	—	—	—	—	—
1991–92	Moncton Hawks	AHL	3	0	1	1	16	—	—	—	—	—
1991–92	Winnipeg Jets	NHL	27	2	9	11	67	7	0	0	0	39
1992–93	Moncton Hawks	AHL	9	1	3	4	26	—	—	—	—	—
1992–93	Fort Wayne Komets	IHL	3	0	1	1	29	—	—	—	—	—
1992–93	Winnipeg Jets	NHL	56	2	14	16	124	4	0	0	0	4
1993–94	Winnipeg Jets	NHL	74	0	17	17	165	—	—	—	—	—
1994–95	Winnipeg Jets	NHL	19	1	3	4	27	—	—	—	—	—
1994–95	Washington Capitals	NHL	3	0	1	1	2	2	0	0	0	4
1995–96	Indianapolis Ice	IHL	1	0	0	0	0	—	—	—	—	—
1995–96	Chicago Blackhawks	NHL	53	1	8	9	92	—	—	—	—	—
1995–96	Tampa Bay Lightning	NHL	11	2	1	3	24	5	0	0	0	15
1996–97	Tampa Bay Lightning	NHL	59	1	7	8	108	—	—	—	—	—
1997–98	Tampa Bay Lightning	NHL	42	2	7	9	85	—	—	—	—	—
1997–98	Montreal Canadiens	NHL	4	0	1	1	12	10	1	4	5	12
1998–99	Montreal Canadiens	NHL	76	3	9	12	109	—	—	—	—	—
1999–00	Montreal Canadiens	NHL	43	1	5	6	76	—	—	—	—	—
1999–00	Edmonton Oilers	NHL	14	0	3	3	10	5	0	0	0	6
2000–01	Edmonton Oilers	NHL	67	3	20	23	90	6	0	0	0	4
2001–02	Hartford Wolf Pack	AHL	6	1	1	2	2	—	—	—	—	—
2001–02	New York Rangers	NHL	39	0	6	6	53	—	—	—	—	—
2001–02	Florida Panthers	NHL	14	0	4	4	11	—	—	—	—	—
2002–03	San Antonio Rampage	AHL	5	1	0	1	4	—	—	—	—	—
2002–03	Florida Panthers	NHL	56	1	1	2	39	—	—	—	—	—
2003–04	Toronto Roadrunners	AHL	10	0	5	5	8	—	—	—	—	—
2003–04	Edmonton Oilers	NHL	42	5	13	18	28	—	—	—	—	—
2005–06	Edmonton Oilers	NHL	37	3	6	9	29	—	—	—	—	—
2006–07	Lokomotiv Yaroslavl	RSL	32	0	5	5	36	7	1	3	4	20
2007–08	Lokomotiv Yaroslavl	RSL	30	1	5	6	56	—	—	—	—	—
2007–08	Lokomotiv–2 Yaroslavl	RUS.3	2	0	2	2	14	—	—	—	—	—
2008–09	Dinamo Minsk	KHL	36	1	4	5	101	—	—	—	—	—
USSR.2 totals			194	19	14	33	310	—	—	—	—	—
NHL totals			739	27	135	162	1151	39	1	4	5	84

=== International ===
Year	Team	Event	GP	G	A	Pts	PIM
1994	Russia	WC	6	1	0	1	20
1996	Russia	WCH	1	0	0	0	4
Senior totals			7	1	0	1	24

== Transactions ==
- 17 October 1995 – Washington traded Ulanov to Chicago 3rd round draft pick in the 1996 NHL entry draft.
- 20 March 1996 – Chicago trades Ulanov, Patrick Poulin and a 2nd round pick in the 1996 NHL entry draft to Tampa Bay for Enrico Ciccone and a 2nd round pick in the same draft.
- 15 January 1998 – Tampa Bay trades Ulanov, Mick Vukota and Patrick Poulin to Montreal for Darcy Tucker, David Wilkie and Stéphane Richer.
- 9 March 2000 – Montreal trades Ulanov and Alain Nasreddine to Edmonton for Christian Laflamme and Matthieu Descoteaux.
- 20 July 2001 – Ulanov signs with New York as a free agent.
- 18 March 2002 – New York Rangers trade Ulanov, Filip Novák, a 1st round pick and 2nd round pick in the 2002 NHL entry draft, and a 4th round pick in the 2003 NHL entry draft to Florida for Pavel Bure and a 2nd round pick in the 2002 NHL Entry Draft.
