= Christian Laflamme =

Canadian ice hockey player

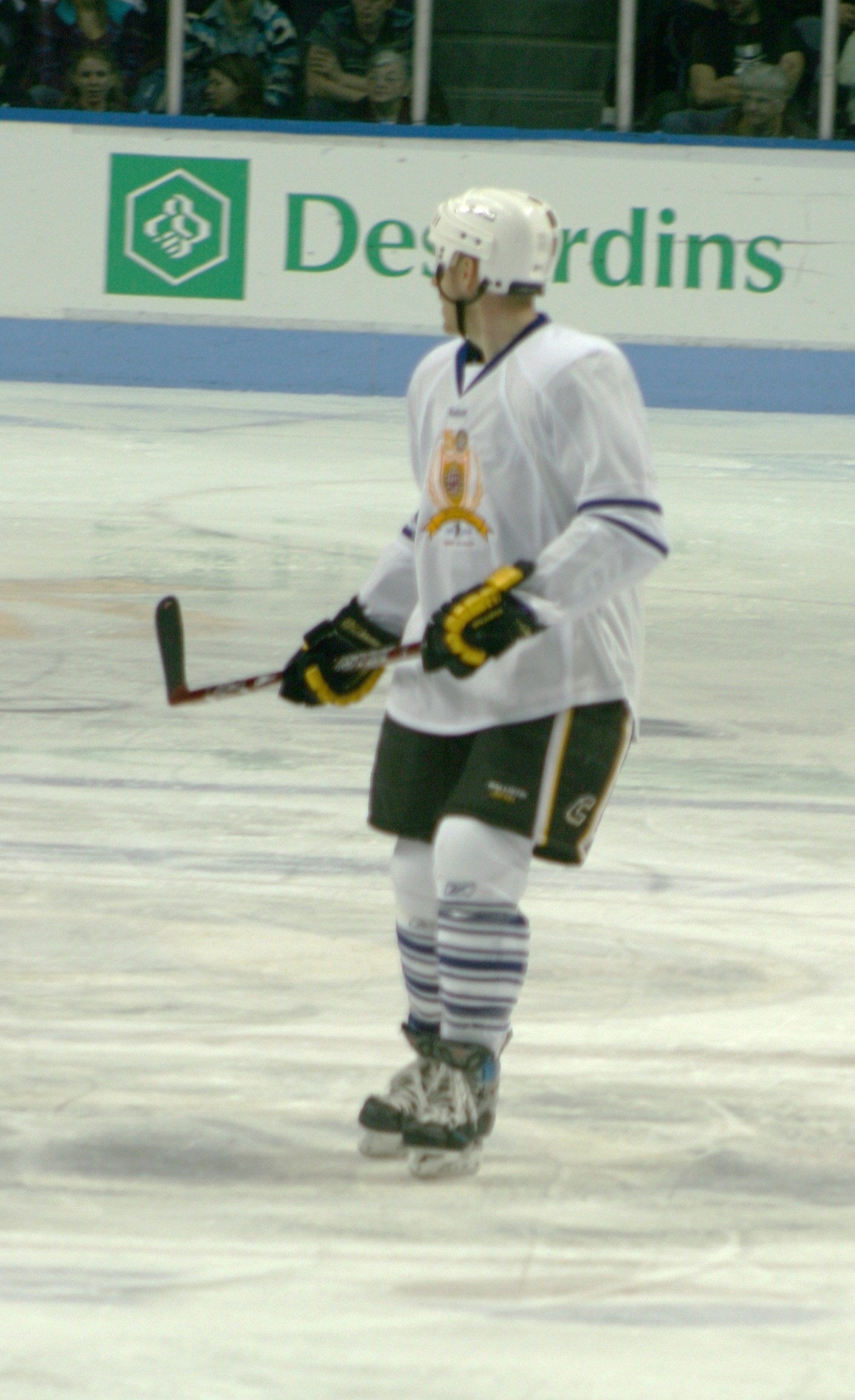
- Christian Laflamme
- Born: November 24, 1976 (age 49) St-Charles, Quebec, Canada
- Height: 6 ft 1 in (185 cm)
- Weight: 195 lb (88 kg; 13 st 13 lb)
- Position: Defence
- Shot: Right
- Played for: Chicago Blackhawks; Edmonton Oilers; Montreal Canadiens; St. Louis Blues
- NHL draft: 45th overall, 1995; Chicago Blackhawks
- Playing career: 1999–2010

Christian Lucien Laflamme (born November 24, 1976) is a Canadian former professional ice hockey defenceman. He played parts of eight seasons in the National Hockey League (NHL) between 1996 and 2004.

== Biography ==
As a youth, Laflamme played in the 1989 and 1990 Quebec International Pee-Wee Hockey Tournaments with a minor ice hockey team from Rive-Sud. Laflamme was selected in the second round of the 1995 NHL entry draft, 45th overall, by the Chicago Blackhawks, after a successful junior career in the Quebec Major Junior Hockey League.

Laflamme started his NHL career with the Blackhawks before being dealt to the Edmonton Oilers in a trade that saw Boris Mironov join the Blackhawks. Laflamme spent less than a calendar year in Edmonton before being traded to the Montreal Canadiens. After two seasons in Montreal with limited playing time, Laflamme signed as a free agent with the St. Louis Blues, where he split time between the NHL and the American Hockey League.

== Career statistics ==
=== Regular season and playoffs ===
			Regular season					Playoffs
Season	Team	League	GP	G	A	Pts	PIM	GP	G	A	Pts	PIM
1991–92	Saine-Foy Gouverneurs	QMAAA	42	5	27	32	100	8	1	2	3	14
1992–93	Verdun Collège Français	QMJHL	69	2	17	19	72	3	0	2	2	6
1993–94	Verdun Collège Français	QMJHL	72	4	34	38	85	4	0	3	3	4
1994–95	Beauport Harfangs	QMJHL	67	6	41	47	82	8	1	4	5	6
1995–96	Beauport Harfangs	QMJHL	41	13	23	36	63	20	7	17	24	32
1996–97	Chicago Blackhawks	NHL	4	0	1	1	2	—	—	—	—	—
1996–97	Indianapolis Ice	IHL	62	5	15	20	60	4	1	1	2	16
1997–98	Chicago Blackhawks	NHL	72	0	11	11	59	—	—	—	—	—
1998–99	Chicago Blackhawks	NHL	62	2	11	13	70	—	—	—	—	—
1998–99	Portland Pirates	AHL	2	0	1	1	2	—	—	—	—	—
1998–99	Edmonton Oilers	NHL	11	0	1	1	0	4	0	1	1	2
1999–00	Edmonton Oilers	NHL	50	0	5	5	32	—	—	—	—	—
1999–00	Montreal Canadiens	NHL	15	0	2	2	8	—	—	—	—	—
2000–01	Montreal Canadiens	NHL	39	0	3	3	42	—	—	—	—	—
2001–02	St. Louis Blues	NHL	8	0	1	1	4	—	—	—	—	—
2001–02	Worcester IceCats	AHL	62	2	17	19	52	—	—	—	—	—
2002–03	St. Louis Blues	NHL	47	0	9	9	45	5	0	0	0	4
2002–03	Worcester IceCats	AHL	8	0	4	4	6	—	—	—	—	—
2003–04	St. Louis Blues	NHL	16	0	1	1	20	—	—	—	—	—
2003–04	Worcester IceCats	AHL	28	1	4	5	25	7	0	0	0	6
2004–05	Kassel Huskies	DEL	43	4	12	16	96	—	—	—	—	—
2005–06	Nürnberg Ice Tigers	DEL	51	6	12	18	86	—	—	—	—	—
2006–07	Nürnberg Ice Tigers	DEL	50	5	16	21	172	13	0	5	5	28
2007–08	Nürnberg Ice Tigers	DEL	54	5	25	30	76	5	0	1	1	4
2008–09	Lois Jeans de Pont-Rouge	LNAH	39	2	20	22	24	—	—	—	—	—
2009–10	Lois Jeans de Pont-Rouge	LNAH	34	3	9	12	34	—	—	—	—	—
NHL totals			324	2	45	47	282	9	0	1	1	6

== Transactions ==
- 8 July 1995 - Laflamme drafted by Chicago.
- 20 March 1999 - Laflamme is dealt by Chicago, along with Daniel Cleary, Ethan Moreau and Chad Kilger to Edmonton in exchange for Boris Mironov, Dean McAmmond and Jonas Elofsson.
- 9 March 2000 - Laflamme is traded by Edmonton to Montreal, along with Matthieu Descoteaux in exchange for Igor Ulanov and Alain Nasreddine.
- 21 August 2001 - Laflamme signs with St. Louis.
