= List of Edmonton Oilers draft picks =

The Edmonton Oilers are a professional ice hockey franchise based in Edmonton, Alberta. They play in the Pacific Division of the Western Conference in the National Hockey League (NHL). They were founded in 1972 as a member of the World Hockey Association (WHA) and played in the WHA until 1979 when they joined the NHL. During their time in the WHA the Oilers drafted 59 players with the 1977 draft being their fifth and final. The NHL Oilers have drafted 395 players in 41 drafts.

The NHL entry draft is held each June, allowing teams to select players who have turned 18 years old by September 15 in the year the draft is held. The draft order is determined by the previous season's order of finish, with non-playoff teams drafting first, followed by the teams that made the playoffs, with the specific order determined by the number of points earned by each team. Since 2016, the NHL holds a weighted lottery for the 15 non-playoff teams, allowing the winners to move up to the top three selections. From 1995–2012 the winner of the draft lottery was allowed to move up a maximum of four positions in the entry draft. The team with the fewest points has the best chance of winning the lottery, with each successive team given a lower chance of moving up in the draft. The Oilers have won the lottery four times, in 2010–2012, and 2015. Between 1986 and 1994, the NHL also held a Supplemental Draft for players in American colleges.

Edmonton's first draft pick in the WHA was John Rogers, taken sixth overall in the 1973 WHA Amateur Draft. Their first pick in the NHL was Kevin Lowe, taken 21st overall in the 1979 NHL entry draft. The highest the Oilers have picked is first overall, which they did on three successive occasions between 2010 and 2012 and, most recently, 2015. They selected Taylor Hall (2010), Ryan Nugent-Hopkins (2011), Nail Yakupov (2012), and Connor McDavid (2015). Seventeen picks went on to play over 1,000 NHL games: Kevin Lowe (21st, 1979), Mark Messier (48th, 1979), Glenn Anderson (69th, 1979), Paul Coffey (6th, 1980), Jari Kurri (69th, 1980), Kelly Buchberger (188th, 1985), Kirk Maltby (65th, 1992), Jason Arnott (7th, 1993), Miroslav Satan (111th, 1993), Ryan Smyth (6th, 1994), Jason Chimera (121st, 1997), Shawn Horcoff (99th, 1998), Andrew Cogliano (25th, 2005), Jeff Petry (45th, 2006), Sam Gagner (6th, 2007), Jordan Eberle (22nd, 2008) and Ryan Nugent-Hopkins (1st, 2011). Six of Edmonton's draft picks, Anderson, Coffey, Grant Fuhr (8th, 1981), Kurri, Lowe, and Messier, have been elected to the Hockey Hall of Fame.

== Key ==
Statistics
Pos	Position	GP	Games played
G	Goals	A	Assists
Pts	Points	PIM	Penalties in minutes
GAA	Goals against average	W	Wins
L	Losses	T	Ties
OT	Overtime or shootout losses	–	Does not apply
S	Supplemental draft selection		

Positions
G	Goaltender
D	Defenceman
LW	Left wing
C	Centre
RW	Right wing
F	Forward

== Draft picks ==
=== WHA ===
Played in at least one WHA game with the Oilers
Played in at least one WHA All-Star Game

Statistics show each player's career regular season totals in the WHA. A player listed with a dash under the games played column did not play in the WHA.

Year	Round	Pick	Player	Nationality	Pos	Team (League)	GP	G	A	Pts	PIM
1973	1	6	John Rogers	Canada	RW	Edmonton Oil Kings (WCHL)	44	9	8	17	34
1973	2	20	Jim McCrimmon	Canada	D	Medicine Hat Tigers (WCHL)	114	3	8	11	158
1973	3	30	Blair MacDonald	Canada	RW	Cornwall Royals (QMJHL)	476	171	165	336	153
1973	3	32	Dave Lewis	Canada	D	Saskatoon Blades (WCHL)	—	—	—	—	—
1973	4	39	Bill Laing	Canada	LW	Saskatoon Blades (WCHL)	96	10	16	26	99
1973	4	45	Jim Moxey	Canada	RW	Hamilton Red Wings (OHA)	—	—	—	—	—
1973	5	58	Ken Houston	Canada	RW	Chatham Maroons (SOJHL)	—	—	—	—	—
1973	6	65	Dave Pay	Canada	LW	University of Wisconsin (WCHA)	—	—	—	—	—
1973	6	71	Yvon Bouillon	Canada	F	Cornwall Royals (QMJHL)	—	—	—	—	—
1973	7	84	Dwayne Pentland	Canada	D	Brandon Wheat Kings (WCHL)	29	1	2	3	6
1974	1	8	Gary Soetaert	Canada	D	Edmonton Oil Kings (WCHL)	—	—	—	—	—
1974	2	23	Glen Burdon	Canada	C	Regina Pats (WCHL)	—	—	—	—	—
1974	3	38	Paul Holmgren	Canada	RW	St. Paul Vulcans (MidJHL)	51	14	16	30	121
1974	4	53	Kevin Treacy	Canada	RW	Cornwall Royals (QMJHL)	—	—	—	—	—
1974	5	67	Dave Langevin	United States	D	University of Minnesota Duluth (WCHA)	216	19	59	78	260
1974	6	82	Bernard Noreau	Canada	RW	Laval National (QMJHL)	—	—	—	—	—
1974	7	97	Tom Sundberg	United States	LW	St. Paul Vulcans (MidJHL)	—	—	—	—	—
1974	8	112	Cam Botting	Canada	RW	Niagara Falls Flyers (SOJHL)	—	—	—	—	—
1974	9	127	Marty Mathews	Canada	LW	Flin Flon Bombers (WCHL)	—	—	—	—	—
1974	10	140	Willie Friesen	Canada	LW	Swift Current Broncos (WCHL)	—	—	—	—	—
1974 Secret	1	7	Clark Gillies	Canada	LW	Regina Pats (WCHL)	—	—	—	—	—
1974 Secret	2	19	Mike Rogers	Canada	C	Calgary Centennials (WCHL)	396	145	222	367	109
1975	1	6	Barry Dean	Canada	LW	Medicine Hat Tigers (WCHL)	71	9	25	34	110
1975	2	21	Peter Morris	Canada	LW	Victoria Cougars (WCHL)	78	7	13	20	36
1975	3	36	Barry Smith	Canada	C	New Westminster Bruins (WCHL)	—	—	—	—	—
1975	4	51	Stu Younger	Canada	LW	Michigan Technological University (WCHA)	—	—	—	—	—
1975	5	66	Jim Ofrim	Canada	C	Alberta Golden Bears (CWUAA)	—	—	—	—	—
1975	6	79	Bob Sunderland	United States	D	Boston University (ECAC)	—	—	—	—	—
1975	7	93	Dave Bell	Canada	C	Harvard University (ECAC)	—	—	—	—	—
1975	8	105	Sidney Veysey	Canada	C	Sherbrooke Castors (QMJHL)	—	—	—	—	—
1975	9	117	Bob Russell	Canada	C	Sudbury Wolves (OHA)	115	20	24	44	60
1975	10	130	Jean Thibodeau	Canada	C	Shawinigan Dynamos (QMJHL)	—	—	—	—	—
1975	11	143	Brian Petrovek	United States	G	Harvard University (ECAC)	—	—	—	—	—
1975	12	154	Jim Montgomery	Canada	C	Hull Festivals (QMJHL)	—	—	—	—	—
1975	13	164	Terry Angel	Canada	RW	Oshawa Generals (OHA)	—	—	—	—	—
1975	14	171	Rick Shinske	Canada	C	New Westminster Bruins (WCHL)	—	—	—	—	—
1976	1	1	Blair Chapman	Canada	RW	Saskatoon Blades (WCHL)	—	—	—	—	—
1976	1	6	Bernie Federko	Canada	C	Saskatoon Blades (WCHL)	—	—	—	—	—
1976	3	28	Harold Phillipoff	Canada	LW	New Westminster Bruins (WCHL)	—	—	—	—	—
1976	3	30	Drew Callander	Canada	C/RW	Regina Pats (WCHL)	—	—	—	—	—
1976	3	36	Brian Sutter	Canada	LW	Lethbridge Broncos (WCHL)	—	—	—	—	—
1976	4	48	Yvon Vautour	Canada	RW	Laval National (QMJHL)	—	—	—	—	—
1976	5	60	Tim Williams	Canada	D	Victoria Cougars (WCHL)	—	—	—	—	—
1976	6	72	Gord Blumenschein	Canada	C	Winnipeg Clubs (WCHL)	—	—	—	—	—
1976	7	84	John Tavella	Canada	LW	Sault Ste. Marie Greyhounds (OHA)	—	—	—	—	—
1976	8	95	Al Dumba	Canada	RW	Regina Pats (WCHL)	—	—	—	—	—
1976	9	106	Jim Bedard	Canada	G	Sudbury Wolves (OHA)	—	—	—	—	—
1977	1	4	Mike Crombeen	Canada	RW	Kingston Canadians (OHA)	—	—	—	—	—
1977	1	11	Ron Areshenkoff	Canada	C	Medicine Hat Tigers (WCHL)	—	—	—	—	—
1977	3	24	Kim Davis	Canada	C	Flin Flon Bombers (WCHL)	—	—	—	—	—
1977	4	33	Neil LaBatte	Canada	C/D	Toronto Marlboros (OHA)	—	—	—	—	—
1977	4	34	Dan Clark	Canada	D	Kamloops Chiefs (WCHL)	—	—	—	—	—
1977	5	42	Rocky Saganiuk	Canada	RW/C	Lethbridge Broncos (WCHL)	—	—	—	—	—
1977	6	51	Julian Baretta	United States	G	Wisconsin Badgers (WCHA)	—	—	—	—	—
1977	7	60	Dave Hoyda	Canada	LW	Portland Winter Hawks (WCHL)	—	—	—	—	—
1977	8	69	Ray Creasy	Canada	C	New Westminster Bruins (WCHL)	—	—	—	—	—
1977	9	77	Guy Lash	Canada	RW	Winnipeg Monarchs (WCHL)	—	—	—	—	—
1977	10	85	Owen Lloyd	Canada	D	Medicine Hat Tigers (WCHL)	3	0	1	1	4

=== NHL ===
Played in at least one NHL game with the Oilers
Selected for at least one NHL All-Star Game
Selected for at least one NHL All-Star Game and NHL All-Star team
Inducted in the Hockey Hall of Fame

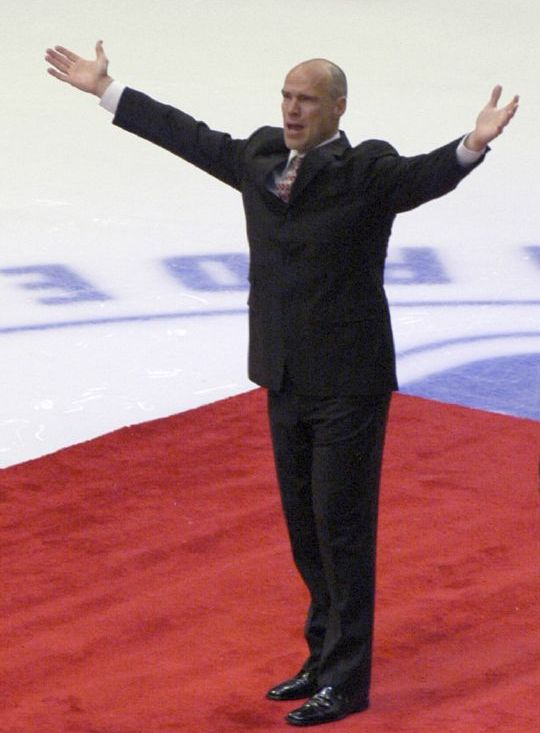
The Oilers selected Mark Messier 48th overall in 1979.

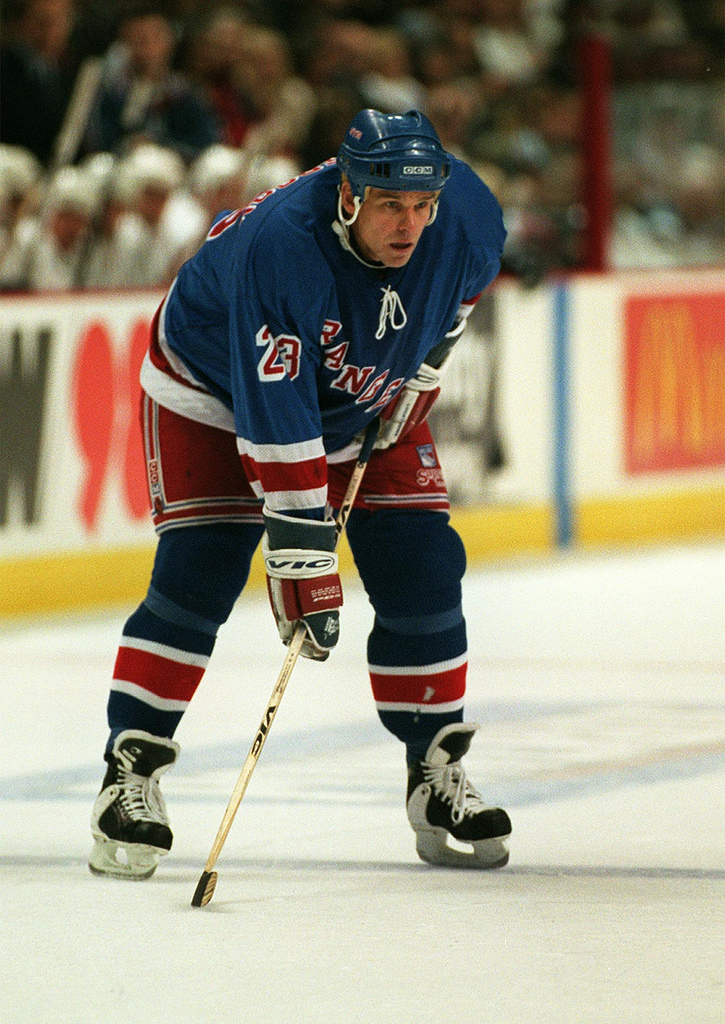
The Oilers selected Jeff Beukeboom, shown here with the New York Rangers, 19th overall in 1983.

Statistics are complete as of the 2025–26 NHL season and show each player's career regular season totals in the NHL. Wins, losses, ties, overtime losses and goals against average apply to goaltenders and are used only for players at that position. A player listed with a dash under the games played column has not played in the NHL.

Year	R.	P.	Player	Nationality	Pos	Team (League)	GP	G	A	Pts	PIM	W	L	T	OT	GAA
1979	1	21	Kevin Lowe	Canada	D	Quebec Remparts (QMJHL)	1254	84	348	432	1498	—	—	—	—	—
1979	3	48	Mark Messier	Canada	LW/C	Cincinnati Stingers (WHA)	1756	694	1193	1887	1910	—	—	—	—	—
1979	4	69	Glenn Anderson	Canada	RW	University of Denver (WCHA)	1129	498	601	1099	1120	—	—	—	—	—
1979	4	84	Max Kostovich	Canada	LW	Portland Winter Hawks (WHL)	—	—	—	—	—	—	—	—	—	—
1979	5	105	Mike Toal	Canada	C	Portland Winter Hawks (WHL)	3	0	0	0	0	—	—	—	—	—
1979	6	126	Blair Barnes	Canada	RW	Windsor Spitfires (OMJHL)	1	0	0	0	0	—	—	—	—	—
1980	1	6	Paul Coffey	Canada	D	Kitchener Rangers (OMJHL)	1409	396	1135	1531	1800	—	—	—	—	—
1980	3	48	Shawn Babcock	Canada	RW	Windsor Spitfires (OMJHL)	—	—	—	—	—	—	—	—	—	—
1980	4	69	Jari Kurri	Finland	RW	Jokerit (SM-liiga)	1251	601	797	1398	545	—	—	—	—	—
1980	5	90	Walt Poddubny	Canada	LW	Kingston Canadians (OMJHL)	468	184	238	422	454	—	—	—	—	—
1980	6	111	Mike Winther	Canada	C	Brandon Wheat Kings (WHL)	—	—	—	—	—	—	—	—	—	—
1980	7	132	Andy Moog	Canada	G	Billings Bighorns (WHL)	713	0	24	24	230	372	209	99	—	3.13
1980	8	153	Rob Polman-Tuin	Canada	G	Michigan Technological University (WCHA)	—	—	—	—	—	—	—	—	—	—
1980	9	174	Lars-Gunnar Pettersson	Sweden	RW/C	IF Bjorkloven (Elitserien)	—	—	—	—	—	—	—	—	—	—
1981	1	8	Grant Fuhr	Canada	G	Victoria Cougars (WHL)	868	0	46	46	120	403	295	114	—	3.38
1981	2	29	Todd Strueby	Canada	LW	Regina Pats (WHL)	5	0	1	1	2	—	—	—	—	—
1981	4	71	Paul Houck	Canada	RW	Kelowna Buckaroos (BCJHL)	16	1	2	2	2	—	—	—	—	—
1981	5	92	Phil Drouillard	Canada	LW	Niagara Falls Flyers (OHL)	—	—	—	—	—	—	—	—	—	—
1981	6	111	Steve Smith	Canada	D	London Knights (OHL)	804	72	303	375	2139	—	—	—	—	—
1981	6	113	Marc Habscheid	Canada	RW/C	Saskatoon Blades (WHL)	345	72	91	163	171	—	—	—	—	—
1981	8	155	Mike Sturgeon	Canada	D	Kelowna Buckaroos (BCJHL)	—	—	—	—	—	—	—	—	—	—
1981	9	176	Miloslav Horava	Czechoslovakia	D	Poldi Kladno (Czech. Extraliga)	80	5	17	22	38	—	—	—	—	—
1981	10	197	Gord Sherven	Canada	C	Weyburn Red Wings (SJHL)	97	13	22	35	33	—	—	—	—	—
1982	1	20	Jim Playfair	Canada	D	Portland Winter Hawks (WHL)	21	2	4	6	51	—	—	—	—	—
1982	2	41	Steve Graves	Canada	LW	Sault Ste. Marie Greyhounds (OHL)	35	5	4	9	10	—	—	—	—	—
1982	3	62	Brent Loney	Canada	LW	Cornwall Royals (OHL)	—	—	—	—	—	—	—	—	—	—
1982	4	83	Jaroslav Pouzar	Czechoslovakia	LW	HC Ceske Budejovice (Czech. Extraliga)	186	34	48	82	135	—	—	—	—	—
1982	5	104	Dwayne Boettger	Canada	D	Toronto Marlboros (OHL)	—	—	—	—	—	—	—	—	—	—
1982	6	125	Raimo Summanen	Finland	LW	Kiekko-Reipas Lahti (SM-liiga)	151	36	40	76	35	—	—	—	—	—
1982	7	146	Brian Small	Canada	RW	Ottawa 67's (OHL)	—	—	—	—	—	—	—	—	—	—
1982	8	167	Dean Clark	Canada	D	St. Albert Saints (AJHL)	1	0	0	0	0	—	—	—	—	—
1982	9	188	Ian Wood	Canada	G	Penticton Knights (BCJHL)	—	—	—	—	—	—	—	—	—	—
1982	10	209	Grant Dion	Canada	D	Cowichan Valley Capitals (BCJHL)	—	—	—	—	—	—	—	—	—	—
1982	11	230	Chris Smith	Canada	G	Regina Pats (WHL)	—	—	—	—	—	—	—	—	—	—
1982	12	251	Jeff Crawford	Canada	RW	Regina Pats (WHL)	—	—	—	—	—	—	—	—	—	—
1983	1	19	Jeff Beukeboom	Canada	D	Sault Ste. Marie Greyhounds (OHL)	804	30	129	159	1890	—	—	—	—	—
1983	2	40	Mike Golden	United States	F	Reading Senior High School (USHS)	—	—	—	—	—	—	—	—	—	—
1983	3	60	Mike Flanagan	United States	D/LW	Acton-Boxborough High School (USHS)	—	—	—	—	—	—	—	—	—	—
1983	4	80	Esa Tikkanen	Finland	LW	HIFK (SM-liiga)	877	244	386	630	1077	—	—	—	—	—
1983	6	120	Don Barber	Canada	W	Kelowna Buckaroos (BCJHL)	115	25	32	57	64	—	—	—	—	—
1983	7	140	Dale Derkatch	Canada	C	Regina Pats (WHL)	—	—	—	—	—	—	—	—	—	—
1983	8	160	Ralph Vos	Canada	LW	Abbotsford Flyers (BCJHL)	—	—	—	—	—	—	—	—	—	—
1983	9	180	Dave Roach	Canada	G	New Westminster Bruins (WHL)	—	—	—	—	—	—	—	—	—	—
1983	10	200	Warren Yadlowski	Canada	C	Calgary Wranglers (WHL)	—	—	—	—	—	—	—	—	—	—
1983	11	220	John Miner	Canada	D	Regina Pats (WHL)	14	2	3	5	16	—	—	—	—	—
1983	12	240	Steven Woodburn	Canada	D	Verdun Juniors (QMJHL)	—	—	—	—	—	—	—	—	—	—
1984	1	21	Selmar Odelein	Canada	D	Regina Pats (WHL)	18	0	2	2	35	—	—	—	—	—
1984	2	42	Daryl Reaugh	Canada	G	Kamloops Junior Oilers (WHL)	27	0	0	0	4	4	9	1	—	3.47
1984	3	63	Todd Norman	United States	C	Hill-Murray School (USHS)	—	—	—	—	—	—	—	—	—	—
1984	4	84	Richard Novak	Canada	RW	Richmond Sockeyes (BCJHL)	—	—	—	—	—	—	—	—	—	—
1984	5	105	Rick Lambert	Canada	LW	Father Henry Carr High School (Canada)	—	—	—	—	—	—	—	—	—	—
1984	6	106	Emanuel Viveiros	Canada	D	Prince Albert Raiders (WHL)	29	1	11	12	6	—	—	—	—	—
1984	6	126	Ivan Dornič	Czechoslovakia	RW	Dukla Trencin (Czech. Extraliga)	—	—	—	—	—	—	—	—	—	—
1984	7	147	Heikki Riihijarvi	Finland	D	Oulun Karpat (SM-liiga)	—	—	—	—	—	—	—	—	—	—
1984	8	168	Todd Ewen	Canada	RW	New Westminster Bruins (WHL)	518	36	40	76	1911	—	—	—	—	—
1984	10	209	Joel Curtis	Canada	LW	Oshawa Generals (OHL)	—	—	—	—	—	—	—	—	—	—
1984	11	229	Simon Wheeldon	Canada	C	Victoria Cougars (WHL)	15	0	2	2	10	—	—	—	—	—
1984	12	250	Darren Gani	Canada	D	Belleville Bulls (OHL)	—	—	—	—	—	—	—	—	—	—
1985	1	20	Scott Metcalfe	Canada	LW	Kingston Canadians (OHL)	19	1	2	3	18	—	—	—	—	—
1985	2	41	Todd Carnelley	Canada	D	Kamloops Blazers (WHL)	—	—	—	—	—	—	—	—	—	—
1985	3	62	Mike Ware	Canada	RW	Hamilton Steelhawks (OHL)	5	0	1	1	15	—	—	—	—	—
1985	5	104	Tomas Kapusta	Czechoslovakia	LW	TJ Gottwaldov (Czech. Extraliga)	—	—	—	—	—	—	—	—	—	—
1985	6	125	Brian Tessier	Canada	G	North Bay Centennials (OHL)	—	—	—	—	—	—	—	—	—	—
1985	7	146	Shawn Tyers	Canada	RW	Kitchener Rangers (OHL)	—	—	—	—	—	—	—	—	—	—
1985	8	167	Tony Fairfield	Canada	RW	St. Albert Saints (AJHL)	—	—	—	—	—	—	—	—	—	—
1985	9	188	Kelly Buchberger	Canada	RW	Moose Jaw Warriors (WHL)	1182	105	204	309	2297	—	—	—	—	—
1985	10	209	Mario Barbe	Canada	D	Chicoutimi Sagueneens (QMJHL)	—	—	—	—	—	—	—	—	—	—
1985	11	230	Peter Headon	Canada	LW	Notre Dame High School (Canada)	—	—	—	—	—	—	—	—	—	—
1985	12	251	John Haley	United States	G	Hull High School (USHS)	—	—	—	—	—	—	—	—	—	—
1986	1	21	Kim Issel	Canada	RW	Prince Albert Raiders (WHL)	4	0	0	0	0	—	—	—	—	—
1986	2	42	Jamie Nicolls	Canada	RW	Portland Winter Hawks (WHL)	—	—	—	—	—	—	—	—	—	—
1986	3	63	Ron Shudra	Canada	D	Kamloops Blazers (WHL)	10	0	5	5	6	—	—	—	—	—
1986	4	84	Dan Currie	Canada	LW	Sault Ste. Marie Greyhounds (OHL)	22	2	1	3	4	—	—	—	—	—
1986	5	105	David Haas	Canada	LW	London Knights (OHL)	7	2	1	3	7	—	—	—	—	—
1986	6	126	Jim Ennis	Canada	D	Boston University (Hockey East)	5	1	0	1	10	—	—	—	—	—
1986	7	147	Ivan Matulik	Czechoslovakia	C	Slovan Bratislava (Czech. Extraliga)	—	—	—	—	—	—	—	—	—	—
1986	8	168	Nick Beaulieu	Canada	LW	Drummondville Voltigeurs (QMJHL)	—	—	—	—	—	—	—	—	—	—
1986	9	189	Mike Greenlay	Canada	G	Penticton Knights (BCJHL)	2	0	1	1	0	0	0	0	—	12.00
1986	10	210	Matt Lanza	United States	D	Winthrop High School (USHS)	—	—	—	—	—	—	—	—	—	—
1986	11	231	Mojmir Bozik	Czechoslovakia	D	HC Kosice (Czech. Extraliga)	—	—	—	—	—	—	—	—	—	—
1986	12	252	Tony Hand	United Kingdom	C	Murrayfield Racers (BHL)	—	—	—	—	—	—	—	—	—	—
1986	S	23	Peter Heinze	United States	D	University of Massachusetts Lowell (Hockey East)	—	—	—	—	—	—	—	—	—	—
1987	1	21	Peter Soberlak	Canada	LW	Swift Current Broncos (WHL)	—	—	—	—	—	—	—	—	—	—
1987	2	42	Brad Werenka	Canada	D	Northern Michigan University (WCHA)	320	19	60	79	299	—	—	—	—	—
1987	3	63	Geoff Smith	Canada	D	St. Albert Saints (AJHL)	462	18	73	91	282	—	—	—	—	—
1987	4	4	Peter Eriksson	Sweden	LW	HV71 (Elitserien)	20	3	3	6	24	—	—	—	—	—
1987	5	105	Shaun Van Allen	Canada	C	Saskatoon Blades (WHL)	794	84	185	269	481	—	—	—	—	—
1987	6	126	Radek Toupal	Czechoslovakia	C	HC Ceske Budejovice (Czech. Extraliga)	—	—	—	—	—	—	—	—	—	—
1987	7	147	Tomas Srsen	Czechoslovakia	RW	TJ Zetor Brno (Czechoslovak Extraliga)	2	0	0	0	0	—	—	—	—	—
1987	8	168	Age Ellingsen	Norway	D	Storhamar Dragons (Norway)	—	—	—	—	—	—	—	—	—	—
1987	9	189	Gavin Armstrong	Canada	G	Rensselaer Polytechnic Institute (ECAC)	—	—	—	—	—	—	—	—	—	—
1987	10	210	Mike Tinkham	United States	C	Newburyport High School (USHS)	—	—	—	—	—	—	—	—	—	—
1987	11	231	Jeff Pauletti	United States	D	University of Minnesota (WCHA)	—	—	—	—	—	—	—	—	—	—
1987	12	241	Jesper Duus	Denmark	D	Roodvre Mighty Bulls (Danish Eliteserien)	—	—	—	—	—	—	—	—	—	—
1987	12	252	Igor Vyazmikin	Soviet Union	W	CSKA Moscow (Soviet League)	4	1	0	0	0	—	—	—	—	—
1988	1	19	Francois Leroux	Canada	D	Saint-Jean Castors (QMJHL)	249	3	20	23	577	—	—	—	—	—
1988	2	39	Petro Koivunen	Finland	C	Kiekko-Espoo U20 (Jr. A SM-sarja)	—	—	—	—	—	—	—	—	—	—
1988	3	53	Trevor Sim	Canada	RW	Seattle Thunderbirds (WHL)	3	0	1	1	2	—	—	—	—	—
1988	3	61	Collin Bauer	Canada	D	Saskatoon Blades (WHL)	—	—	—	—	—	—	—	—	—	—
1988	4	82	Cam Brauer	Canada	D	Rensselaer Polytechnic Institute (ECAC)	—	—	—	—	—	—	—	—	—	—
1988	5	103	Don Martin	Canada	D	London Knights (OHL)	—	—	—	—	—	—	—	—	—	—
1988	6	124	Len Barrie	Canada	C	Victoria Cougars (WHL)	184	19	45	64	290	—	—	—	—	—
1988	7	145	Mike Glover	Canada	RW	Sault Ste. Marie Greyhounds (OHL)	—	—	—	—	—	—	—	—	—	—
1988	8	166	Shjon Podein	United States	LW	University of Minnesota Duluth (WCHA)	699	100	106	206	439	—	—	—	—	—
1988	9	187	Tom Cole	United States	G	Woburn Memorial High School (USHS)	—	—	—	—	—	—	—	—	—	—
1988	10	208	Vladimir Zubkov	Soviet Union	D	CSKA Moscow (Soviet League)	—	—	—	—	—	—	—	—	—	—
1988	11	229	Darin MacDonald	United States	F	Boston University (Hockey East)	—	—	—	—	—	—	—	—	—	—
1988	12	250	Tim Tisdale	Canada	C	Swift Current Broncos (WHL)	—	—	—	—	—	—	—	—	—	—
1988	S	24	Brian Dowd	Canada	D	Northeastern University (Hockey East)	—	—	—	—	—	—	—	—	—	—
1989	1	15	Jason Soules	Canada	D	Niagara Falls Thunder (OHL)	—	—	—	—	—	—	—	—	—	—
1989	2	36	Richard Borgo	Canada	RW	Kitchener Rangers (OHL)	—	—	—	—	—	—	—	—	—	—
1989	4	78	Josef Beranek	Czechoslovakia	LW/C	HC Litvinov (Czech. Extraliga)	531	118	144	262	398	—	—	—	—	—
1989	5	92	Peter White	Canada	C	Michigan State University (CCHA)	220	23	37	60	36	—	—	—	—	—
1989	6	120	Anatoli Semenov	Soviet Union	C/LW	Dynamo Moscow (Soviet League)	362	68	126	194	122	—	—	—	—	—
1989	7	140	Davis Payne	Canada	LW	Michigan Technological University (WCHA)	22	0	1	1	14	—	—	—	—	—
1989	7	141	Sergei Yashin	Soviet Union	LW	Dynamo Moscow (Soviet League)	—	—	—	—	—	—	—	—	—	—
1989	8	162	Darcy Martini	Canada	D	Michigan Technological University (WCHA)	2	0	0	0	0	—	—	—	—	—
1989	11	225	Roman Bozek	Czechoslovakia	F	HC Ceske Budejovice (Czech Extraliga)	—	—	—	—	—	—	—	—	—	—
1989	S	20	Dave Aiken	United States	F	University of New Hampshire (Hockey East)	—	—	—	—	—	—	—	—	—	—
1990	1	17	Scott Allison	Canada	LW	Prince Albert Raiders (WHL)	—	—	—	—	—	—	—	—	—	—
1990	2	38	Alexander Legault	Canada	D	Boston University (Hockey East)	—	—	—	—	—	—	—	—	—	—
1990	3	59	Joe Crowley	United States	LW	Lawrence Academy (USHS)	—	—	—	—	—	—	—	—	—	—
1990	4	67	Joel Blain	Canada	LW	Hull Olympiques (QMJHL)	—	—	—	—	—	—	—	—	—	—
1990	5	101	Greg Louder	United States	G	Cushing Academy (USHS)	—	—	—	—	—	—	—	—	—	—
1990	6	122	Keijo Sailynoja	Finland	RW	Jokerit (SM-liiga)	—	—	—	—	—	—	—	—	—	—
1990	7	143	Mike Power	Canada	G	Western Michigan University (CCHA)	—	—	—	—	—	—	—	—	—	—
1990	8	164	Roman Mejzlik	Czechoslovakia	RW	Dukla Jihlava (Czech. Extraliga)	—	—	—	—	—	—	—	—	—	—
1990	9	185	Richard Zemlicka	Czechoslovakia	LW	Sparta Prague (Czech. Extraliga)	—	—	—	—	—	—	—	—	—	—
1990	10	206	Petr Korinek	Czechoslovakia	C	TJ Skoda Plzen (Czech. Extraliga)	—	—	—	—	—	—	—	—	—	—
1990	12	248	Sami Nuutinen	Finland	D	Kiekko-Espoo U20 (Jr. A SM-sarja)	—	—	—	—	—	—	—	—	—	—
1990	S	22	Sandy Galuppo	United States	G	Boston College (Hockey East)	—	—	—	—	—	—	—	—	—	—
1991	1	12	Tyler Wright	Canada	C	Swift Current Broncos (WHL)	613	79	70	149	854	—	—	—	—	—
1991	1	20	Martin Rucinsky	Czechoslovakia	LW	HC Litvinov (Czech. Extraliga)	961	241	371	612	821	—	—	—	—	—
1991	2	34	Andrew Verner	Canada	G	Peterborough Petes (OHL)	—	—	—	—	—	—	—	—	—	—
1991	3	56	George Breen	United States	RW	Cushing Academy (USHS)	—	—	—	—	—	—	—	—	—	—
1991	4	78	Mario Nobili	Canada	RW	Verdun College Francais (QMJHL)	—	—	—	—	—	—	—	—	—	—
1991	5	93	Ryan Haggerty	United States	LW	Westminster High School (USHS)	—	—	—	—	—	—	—	—	—	—
1991	7	144	David Oliver	Canada	RW	University of Michigan (CCHA)	233	49	49	98	84	—	—	—	—	—
1991	8	166	Gary Kitching	Canada	C	Thunder Bay Flyers (USHL)	—	—	—	—	—	—	—	—	—	—
1991	10	210	Vegar Barlie	Norway	F	Valerenga Ishockey (Norway)	—	—	—	—	—	—	—	—	—	—
1991	11	232	Evgeny Belosheikin	Soviet Union	G	CSKA Moscow (Soviet League)	—	—	—	—	—	—	—	—	—	—
1991	12	254	Juha Riihijarvi	Finland	RW	Oulun Karpat (SM-liiga)	—	—	—	—	—	—	—	—	—	—
1991	S	18	Tom Holdeman	United States	RW	Miami University (CCHA)	—	—	—	—	—	—	—	—	—	—
1992	1	13	Joe Hulbig	United States	LW	Saint Sebastian's School (USHS)	55	4	4	8	16	—	—	—	—	—
1992	2	37	Martin Reichel	Germany	C	EHC Freiburg (Eishockey-Bundesliga)	—	—	—	—	—	—	—	—	—	—
1992	3	61	Simon Roy	Canada	D	Shawinigan Cataractes (QMJHL)	—	—	—	—	—	—	—	—	—	—
1992	3	65	Kirk Maltby	Canada	RW	Owen Sound Platers (OHL)	1072	128	132	260	867	—	—	—	—	—
1992	4	96	Ralph Intranuovo	Canada	C	Sault Ste. Marie Greyhounds (OHL)	22	2	4	6	4	—	—	—	—	—
1992	5	109	Joaquin Gage	Canada	G	Portland Winter Hawks (WHL)	23	0	1	1	4	4	12	1	—	3.74
1992	7	157	Steve Gibson	Canada	LW	Windsor Spitfires (OHL)	—	—	—	—	—	—	—	—	—	—
1992	8	181	Kyuin Shim	Canada	LW	Sherwood Park Crusaders (AJHL)	—	—	—	—	—	—	—	—	—	—
1992	8	190	Colin Schmidt	Canada	C	Regina Pat Canadians (SMAAAHL)	—	—	—	—	—	—	—	—	—	—
1992	9	205	Marko Tuomainen	Finland	RW	Clarkson University (ECAC)	79	9	9	18	84	—	—	—	—	—
1992	11	253	Brian Rasmussen	Canada	RW	Saint Louis Park High School (USHS)	—	—	—	—	—	—	—	—	—	—
1993	1	7	Jason Arnott	Canada	C	Oshawa Generals (OHL)	1244	417	521	938	1242	—	—	—	—	—
1993	1	16	Nick Stajduhar	Canada	D	London Knights (OHL)	2	0	0	0	4	—	—	—	—	—
1993	2	33	David Vyborny	Czech Republic	RW	Sparta Prague (Czech Extraliga)	543	113	204	317	228	—	—	—	—	—
1993	3	59	Kevin Paden	United States	LW	Detroit Junior Red Wings (OHL)	—	—	—	—	—	—	—	—	—	—
1993	3	60	Aleksandrs Kercs	Latvia	LW	Pardaugava Riga (IHL)	5	0	0	0	2	—	—	—	—	—
1993	5	111	Miroslav Satan	Slovakia	LW	Dukla Trencin (Czech Extraliga)	1050	363	372	735	464	—	—	—	—	—
1993	7	163	Aleksandr Zhurik	Belarus	D	Tivali Minsk (IHL)	—	—	—	—	—	—	—	—	—	—
1993	8	189	Martin Bakula	Czech Republic	D	University of Alaska Anchorage (WCHA)	—	—	—	—	—	—	—	—	—	—
1993	9	215	Brad Norton	United States	D	Cushing Academy (USHS)	124	3	8	11	287	—	—	—	—	—
1993	10	241	Oleg Maltsev	Russia	LW	Traktor Chelyabinsk (IHL)	—	—	—	—	—	—	—	—	—	—
1993	11	267	Ilya Byakin	Russia	D	EV Landshut (Eishockey-Bundesliga)	57	8	25	33	44	—	—	—	—	—
1993	S	7	Brett Abel	United States	G	University of New Hampshire (Hockey East)	—	—	—	—	—	—	—	—	—	—
1994	1	4	Jason Bonsignore	United States	C	Niagara Falls Thunder (OHL)	79	3	13	16	34	—	—	—	—	—
1994	1	6	Ryan Smyth	Canada	LW	Moose Jaw Warriors (WHL)	1270	386	456	842	976	—	—	—	—	—
1994	2	32	Mike Watt	Canada	LW	Stratford Cullitons (WOHL)	157	15	26	41	41	—	—	—	—	—
1994	3	53	Corey Neilson	Canada	D	North Bay Centennials (OHL)	—	—	—	—	—	—	—	—	—	—
1994	3	60	Brad Symes	Canada	D	Portland Winter Hawks (WHL)	—	—	—	—	—	—	—	—	—	—
1994	4	79	Adam Copeland	Canada	RW	Burlington Cougars (OPJHL)	—	—	—	—	—	—	—	—	—	—
1994	4	95	Jussi Tarvainen	Finland	RW	KalPa Kuopi (SM-liiga)	—	—	—	—	—	—	—	—	—	—
1994	5	110	Jon Gaskins	United States	LW	Dubuque Fighting Saints (USHL)	—	—	—	—	—	—	—	—	—	—
1994	6	136	Terry Marchant	United States	C	Niagara Scenics (NAJHL)	—	—	—	—	—	—	—	—	—	—
1994	7	160	Curtis Sheptak	Canada	D	Olds Grizzlys (AJHL)	—	—	—	—	—	—	—	—	—	—
1994	7	162	Dimitrius Sulba	Belarus	RW	Tivali Minsk (IHL)	—	—	—	—	—	—	—	—	—	—
1994	7	179	Chris Wickenheiser	Canada	G	Red Deer Rebels (WHL)	—	—	—	—	—	—	—	—	—	—
1994	8	185	Rob Guinn	Canada	D	Newmarket Royals (OHL)	—	—	—	—	—	—	—	—	—	—
1994	8	188	Jason Reid	Canada	D	St. Andrew's College (Canada)	—	—	—	—	—	—	—	—	—	—
1994	9	214	Jeremy Jablonski	Canada	G	Victoria Cougars (WHL)	—	—	—	—	—	—	—	—	—	—
1994	11	266	Ladislav Benysek	Czech Republic	D	HC Olomouc (Czech Extraliga)	161	3	12	15	74	—	—	—	—	—
1994	S	6	Chad Dameworth	United States	D	Northern Michigan University (WCHA)	—	—	—	—	—	—	—	—	—	—
1995	1	6	Steve Kelly	Canada	C	Prince Albert Raiders (WHL)	149	9	12	21	83	—	—	—	—	—
1995	2	31	Georges Laraque	Canada	RW	Saint-Jean Lynx (QMJHL)	695	53	100	153	1126	—	—	—	—	—
1995	3	57	Lukas Zib	Czech Republic	D	HC Ceske Budejovice (Czech Extraliga)	—	—	—	—	—	—	—	—	—	—
1995	4	83	Mike Minard	Canada	G	Chilliwack Chiefs (BCJHL)	1	0	0	0	0	0	0	0	—	3.00
1995	5	109	Jan Snopek	Czech Republic	D	Oshawa Generals (OHL)	—	—	—	—	—	—	—	—	—	—
1995	7	161	Martin Cerven	Slovakia	C	Dukla Trencin (Slovak Extraliga)	—	—	—	—	—	—	—	—	—	—
1995	8	187	Stephen Douglas	Canada	D	Niagara Falls Thunder (OHL)	—	—	—	—	—	—	—	—	—	—
1995	9	213	Jiri Antonín	Czech Republic	D	HC Pardubice (Czech Extraliga)	—	—	—	—	—	—	—	—	—	—
1996	1	6	Boyd Devereaux	Canada	C	Kitchener Rangers (OHL)	627	67	112	179	205	—	—	—	—	—
1996	1	19	Matthieu Descoteaux	Canada	D	Shawinigan Cataractes (QMJHL)	5	1	1	2	4	—	—	—	—	—
1996	2	32	Chris Hajt	Canada	D	Guelph Storm (OHL)	6	0	0	0	2	—	—	—	—	—
1996	3	59	Tom Poti	United States	D	Cushing Academy (USHS)	824	69	258	327	588	—	—	—	—	—
1996	5	114	Brian Urick	United States	RW	University of Notre Dame (CCHA)	—	—	—	—	—	—	—	—	—	—
1996	6	141	Bryan Randall	Canada	RW	Medicine Hat Tigers (WHL)	—	—	—	—	—	—	—	—	—	—
1996	7	168	David Bernier	Canada	RW	Saint-Hyacinthe Laser (QMJHL)	—	—	—	—	—	—	—	—	—	—
1996	7	170	Brandon Lafrance	Canada	RW	Ohio State University (CCHA)	—	—	—	—	—	—	—	—	—	—
1996	8	195	Fernando Pisani	Canada	RW	St. Albert Saints (AJHL)	462	87	82	169	200	—	—	—	—	—
1996	9	221	John Hultberg	United States	G	Kingston Frontenacs (OHL)	—	—	—	—	—	—	—	—	—	—
1997	1	14	Michel Riesen	Switzerland	RW	EHC Biel (NLB)	12	0	1	1	4	—	—	—	—	—
1997	2	41	Patrick Dovigi	Canada	G	Erie Otters (OHL)	—	—	—	—	—	—	—	—	—	—
1997	3	68	Sergei Yerkovich	Belarus	D	Las Vegas Thunder (IHL)	—	—	—	—	—	—	—	—	—	—
1997	4	94	Jonas Elofsson	Sweden	D	Farjestad BK (Elitserien)	—	—	—	—	—	—	—	—	—	—
1997	5	121	Jason Chimera	Canada	LW	Medicine Hat Tigers (WHL)	1107	186	229	415	892	—	—	—	—	—
1997	6	141	Peter Sarno	Canada	C	Windsor Spitfires (OHL)	7	1	0	1	2	—	—	—	—	—
1997	7	176	Kevin Bolibruck	Canada	D	Peterborough Petes (OHL)	—	—	—	—	—	—	—	—	—	—
1997	7	187	Chad Hinz	Canada	C	Moose Jaw Warriors (WHL)	—	—	—	—	—	—	—	—	—	—
1997	8	205	Chris Kerr	Canada	D	Sudbury Wolves (OHL)	—	—	—	—	—	—	—	—	—	—
1997	9	231	Alexander Fomichev	Russia	G	St. Albert Saints (AJHL)	—	—	—	—	—	—	—	—	—	—
1998	1	13	Michael Henrich	Canada	RW	Barrie Colts (OHL)	—	—	—	—	—	—	—	—	—	—
1998	3	67	Alex Henry	Canada	D	London Knights (OHL)	177	2	9	11	269	—	—	—	—	—
1998	4	99	Shawn Horcoff	Canada	C	Michigan State University (CCHA)	1008	186	325	511	624	—	—	—	—	—
1998	4	113	Kristian Antila	Finland	G	Ilves U20 (Jr. A SM-sarja)	—	—	—	—	—	—	—	—	—	—
1998	5	128	Paul Elliott	Canada	D	Lethbridge Hurricanes (WHL)	—	—	—	—	—	—	—	—	—	—
1998	5	144	Oleg Smirnov	Russia	LW	Kristall Elektrostal (RSL)	—	—	—	—	—	—	—	—	—	—
1998	6	159	Trevor Ettinger	Canada	D	Cape Breton Screaming Eagles (QMJHL)	—	—	—	—	—	—	—	—	—	—
1998	7	186	Mike Morrison	United States	G	Exeter High School (USHS)	29	0	1	1	2	11	7	—	3	3.27
1998	8	213	Christian Lefebvre	Canada	D	Baie-Comeau Drakkar (QMJHL)	—	—	—	—	—	—	—	—	—	—
1998	9	241	Maxim Spiridonov	Russia	RW	London Knights (OHL)	—	—	—	—	—	—	—	—	—	—
1999	1	13	Jani Rita	Finland	LW	Jokerit (SM-liiga)	66	9	5	14	10	—	—	—	—	—
1999	2	36	Alexei Semenov	Russia	D	Sudbury Wolves (OHL)	211	7	26	33	249	—	—	—	—	—
1999	2	41	Tony Salmelainen	Finland	LW	HIFK (SM-liiga)	70	6	12	18	30	—	—	—	—	—
1999	3	81	Adam Hauser	United States	G	Minnesota Golden Gophers (WCHA)	1	0	0	0	0	0	0	—	0	7.08
1999	3	91	Mike Comrie	Canada	C	University of Michigan (CCHA)	589	168	197	365	443	—	—	—	—	—
1999	5	139	Jonathan Fauteux	Canada	D	Val-d'Or Foreurs (QMJHL)	—	—	—	—	—	—	—	—	—	—
1999	6	171	Chris Legg	Canada	F	London Nationals (WOHL)	—	—	—	—	—	—	—	—	—	—
1999	7	199	Christian Chartier	Canada	D	Saskatoon Blades (WHL)	—	—	—	—	—	—	—	—	—	—
1999	9	256	Tamas Groschl	Hungary	LW	Leksands IF (Elitserien)	—	—	—	—	—	—	—	—	—	—
2000	1	17	Alexei Mikhnov	Russia	LW	Torpedo Yaroslavl (RSL)	2	0	0	0	0	—	—	—	—	—
2000	2	35	Brad Winchester	United States	LW	University of Wisconsin (WCHA)	390	37	31	68	552	—	—	—	—	—
2000	3	83	Alexander Lyubimov	Russia	D	CSK VVS Samara (RSL)	—	—	—	—	—	—	—	—	—	—
2000	4	113	Lou Dickenson	Canada	C	Mississauga IceDogs (OHL)	—	—	—	—	—	—	—	—	—	—
2000	5	152	Paul Flache	Canada	D	Brampton Battalion (OHL)	—	—	—	—	—	—	—	—	—	—
2000	6	184	Shaun Norrie	Canada	RW	Calgary Hitmen (WHL)	—	—	—	—	—	—	—	—	—	—
2000	7	211	Joe Cullen	Canada	C	Colorado College (WCHA)	—	—	—	—	—	—	—	—	—	—
2000	7	215	Matthew Lombardi	Canada	C	Victoriaville Tigres (QMJHL)	536	101	161	262	293	—	—	—	—	—
2000	8	247	Jason Platt	United States	D	Omaha Lancers (USHL)	—	—	—	—	—	—	—	—	—	—
2000	9	274	Evgeny Muratov	Russia	F	Neftekhimik Nizhnekamsk (RSL)	—	—	—	—	—	—	—	—	—	—
2001	1	13	Ales Hemsky	Czech Republic	RW	Hull Olympiques (QMJHL)	845	174	398	572	353	—	—	—	—	—
2001	2	43	Doug Lynch	Canada	D	Red Deer Rebels (WHL)	2	0	0	0	0	—	—	—	—	—
2001	2	52	Ed Caron	United States	LW	Phillips Exeter Academy (USHS)	—	—	—	—	—	—	—	—	—	—
2001	3	84	Kenny Smith	United States	D	Harvard University (ECAC)	—	—	—	—	—	—	—	—	—	—
2001	5	133	Jussi Markkanen	Finland	G	Tappara (SM-liiga)	128	0	2	2	4	43	47	8	7	2.70
2001	5	154	Jake Brenk	United States	F	Breck School (USHS)	—	—	—	—	—	—	—	—	—	—
2001	6	185	Mikael Svensk	Sweden	D	Frolunda HC U20 (SuperElit)	—	—	—	—	—	—	—	—	—	—
2001	7	215	Dan Baum	Canada	LW	Prince George Cougars (WHL)	—	—	—	—	—	—	—	—	—	—
2001	8	248	Kari Haakana	Finland	D	Jokerit (SM-liiga)	13	0	0	0	4	—	—	—	—	—
2001	9	272	Ales Pisa	Czech Republic	D	HC Pardubice (Czech Extraliga)	53	1	3	4	26	—	—	—	—	—
2001	9	278	Shay Stephenson	Canada	LW	Red Deer Rebels (WHL)	2	0	0	0	0	—	—	—	—	—
2002	1	15	Jesse Niinimäki	Finland	C	Ilves (SM-sarja)	—	—	—	—	—	—	—	—	—	—
2002	2	31	Jeff Deslauriers	Canada	G	Chicoutimi Sagueneens (QMJHL)	62	0	4	4	8	23	32	—	4	3.24
2002	2	36	Jarret Stoll	Canada	C	Kootenay Ice (WHL)	872	144	244	388	618	—	—	—	—	—
2002	2	44	Matt Greene	United States	D	Green Bay Gamblers (USHL)	615	17	63	80	663	—	—	—	—	—
2002	3	79	Brock Radunske	Canada	LW	Michigan State University (CCHA)	—	—	—	—	—	—	—	—	—	—
2002	4	106	Ivan Koltsov	Russia	D	Severstal Cherepovets Jr. (RHL)	—	—	—	—	—	—	—	—	—	—
2002	4	111	Jonas Almtorp	Sweden	C	Modo Hockey (SuperElit)	—	—	—	—	—	—	—	—	—	—
2002	4	123	Robin Kovar	Czech Republic	D	Vancouver Giants (WHL)	—	—	—	—	—	—	—	—	—	—
2002	5	148	Glenn Fisher	Canada	G	Fort Saskatchewan Traders (AJHL)	—	—	—	—	—	—	—	—	—	—
2002	6	181	Mikko Luoma	Finland	D	Tappara (SM-liiga)	3	0	1	1	0	—	—	—	—	—
2002	7	205	Jean-Francois Dufort	Canada	LW	Cape Breton Screaming Eagles (QMJHL)	—	—	—	—	—	—	—	—	—	—
2002	7	211	Patrick Murphy	Canada	LW	Newmarket Hurricanes (OPJHL)	—	—	—	—	—	—	—	—	—	—
2002	8	244	Dwight Helminen	United States	C	University of Michigan (CCHA)	27	2	1	3	0	—	—	—	—	—
2002	8	245	Tomas Micka	Czech Republic	F	Slavia Prague U20 (Jr. A Czech Extraliga)	—	—	—	—	—	—	—	—	—	—
2002	9	274	Fredrik Johansson	Sweden	C	Frolunda HC U20 (SuperElit)	—	—	—	—	—	—	—	—	—	—
2003	1	22	Marc-Antoine Pouliot	Canada	C	Rimouski Oceanic (QMJHL)	192	21	36	57	76	—	—	—	—	—
2003	2	51	Colin McDonald	United States	RW	New England Junior Falcons (EJHL)	148	20	26	46	73	—	—	—	—	—
2003	2	68	Jean-Francois Jacques	Canada	LW	Baie-Comeau Drakkar (QMJHL)	166	9	8	17	197	—	—	—	—	—
2003	3	72	Mikhail Zhukov	Russia	C	IFK Arboga IK (Allsvenskan)	—	—	—	—	—	—	—	—	—	—
2003	3	94	Zack Stortini	Canada	C	Sudbury Wolves (OHL)	257	14	27	41	725	—	—	—	—	—
2003	5	147	Kalle Olsson	Sweden	RW	Frolunda HC U20 (SuperElit)	—	—	—	—	—	—	—	—	—	—
2003	5	154	David Rohlfs	United States	D	Detroit Compuware Ambassadors (NAHL)	—	—	—	—	—	—	—	—	—	—
2003	6	184	Dragan Umicevic	Sweden	RW	Sodertalje SK (Elitserien)	—	—	—	—	—	—	—	—	—	—
2003	7	214	Kyle Brodziak	Canada	C	Moose Jaw Warriors (WHL)	917	129	167	296	462	—	—	—	—	—
2003	7	215	Mathieu Roy	Canada	D	Val-d'Or Foreurs (QMJHL)	66	2	11	13	76	—	—	—	—	—
2003	8	248	Josef Hrabal	Czech Republic	LW	HC Vsetin U20 (Jr. A Czech Extraliga)	—	—	—	—	—	—	—	—	—	—
2003	9	278	Troy Bodie	Canada	LW	Kelowna Rockets (WHL)	159	9	12	21	172	—	—	—	—	—
2004	1	14	Devan Dubnyk	Canada	G	Kamloops Blazers (WHL)	542	0	8	8	46	253	206	—	54	2.61
2004	1	25	Rob Schremp	United States	C	London Knights (OHL)	114	20	34	54	26	—	—	—	—	—
2004	2	44	Roman Tesliuk	Russia	D	Kamloops Blazers (WHL)	—	—	—	—	—	—	—	—	—	—
2004	2	57	Geoff Paukovich	United States	LW	U.S. National Team Development Program (USHL)	—	—	—	—	—	—	—	—	—	—
2004	4	112	Liam Reddox	Canada	LW	Peterborough Petes (OHL)	100	6	18	24	34	—	—	—	—	—
2004	5	146	Bryan Young	Canada	D	Peterborough Petes (OHL)	17	0	0	0	10	—	—	—	—	—
2004	6	177	Max Gordichuk	Canada	D	Kamloops Blazers (WHL)	—	—	—	—	—	—	—	—	—	—
2004	7	208	Stephane Goulet	Canada	RW	Quebec Remparts (QMJHL)	—	—	—	—	—	—	—	—	—	—
2004	8	242	Tyler Spurgeon	Canada	C	Kelowna Rockets (WHL)	—	—	—	—	—	—	—	—	—	—
2004	9	274	Bjorn Bjurling	Sweden	G	Djurgardens IF (Elitserien)	—	—	—	—	—	—	—	—	—	—
2005	1	25	Andrew Cogliano	Canada	C	St. Michael's Buzzers (OPJHL)	1294	190	274	464	449	—	—	—	—	—
2005	2	36	Taylor Chorney	United States	D	Shattuck-Saint Mary's (USHS)	166	4	18	22	56	—	—	—	—	—
2005	3	81	Danny Syvret	Canada	D	London Knights (OHL)	59	3	4	7	30	—	—	—	—	—
2005	3	86	Robby Dee	United States	C	Breck School (USHS)	—	—	—	—	—	—	—	—	—	—
2005	4	97	Chris VandeVelde	United States	C	Lincoln Stars (USHL)	278	18	30	48	95	—	—	—	—	—
2005	4	120	Vyacheslav Trukhno	Russia	LW	Prince Edward Island Rocket (QMJHL)	—	—	—	—	—	—	—	—	—	—
2005	5	157	Fredrik Pettersson	Sweden	LW	Frolunda HC U20 (SuperElit)	—	—	—	—	—	—	—	—	—	—
2005	7	220	Matthew Glasser	Canada	LW	Fort McMurray Oil Barons (AJHL)	—	—	—	—	—	—	—	—	—	—
2006	2	45	Jeff Petry	United States	D	Des Moines Buccaneers (USHL)	1048	96	298	394	428	—	—	—	—	—
2006	3	75	Theo Peckham	Canada	D	Owen Sound Attack (OHL)	160	4	13	17	388	—	—	—	—	—
2006	5	133	Bryan Pitton	Canada	G	Brampton Battalion (OHL)	—	—	—	—	—	—	—	—	—	—
2006	5	140	Cody Wild	Canada	D	Providence College (Hockey East)	—	—	—	—	—	—	—	—	—	—
2006	6	170	Alexander Bumagin	Russia	F	Lada Togliatti (RSL)	—	—	—	—	—	—	—	—	—	—
2007	1	6	Sam Gagner	Canada	C	London Knights (OHL)	1043	197	332	529	450	—	—	—	—	—
2007	1	15	Alex Plante	Canada	D	Calgary Hitmen (WHL)	10	0	2	2	15	—	—	—	—	—
2007	1	21	Riley Nash	Canada	C	Salmon Arm Silverbacks (BCHL)	628	63	113	176	144	—	—	—	—	—
2007	4	97	Linus Omark	Sweden	LW	Lulea HF (Elitserien)	79	8	24	32	40	—	—	—	—	—
2007	5	127	Milan Kytnar	Slovakia	C	HC Topolcany (Slovak 1.Liga)	1	0	0	0	0	—	—	—	—	—
2007	6	157	William Quist	Sweden	F	Tingsryds AIF U20 (SuperElit)	—	—	—	—	—	—	—	—	—	—
2008	1	22	Jordan Eberle	Canada	C	Regina Pats (WHL)	1140	334	449	783	293	—	—	—	—	—
2008	4	103	Johan Motin	Sweden	D	Bofors IK (HockeyAllsvenskan)	1	0	0	0	0	—	—	—	—	—
2008	5	133	Philippe Cornet	Canada	LW	Rimouski Oceanic (QMJHL)	2	0	1	1	0	—	—	—	—	—
2008	6	163	Teemu Hartikainen	Finland	LW	KalPa U20 (Jr. A SM-SM-liiga)	52	6	7	13	16	—	—	—	—	—
2008	7	193	Jordan Bendfeld	Canada	D	Medicine Hat Tigers (WHL)	—	—	—	—	—	—	—	—	—	—
2009	1	10	Magnus Paajarvi	Sweden	LW	Timra IK (Elitserien)	467	62	63	124	78	—	—	—	—	—
2009	2	40	Anton Lander	Sweden	C	Timra IK (Elitserien)	215	10	25	35	56	—	—	—	—	—
2009	3	71	Troy Hesketh	United States	D	Minnetonka High School (USHS)	—	—	—	—	—	—	—	—	—	—
2009	3	82	Cameron Abney	Canada	RW	Everett Silvertips (WHL)	—	—	—	—	—	—	—	—	—	—
2009	4	99	Kyle Bigos	United States	D	Vernon Vipers (BCHL)	—	—	—	—	—	—	—	—	—	—
2009	4	101	Toni Rajala	Finland	RW	Ilves U20 (Jr. A SM-sarja)	—	—	—	—	—	—	—	—	—	—
2009	5	133	Olivier Roy	Canada	G	Cape Breton Screaming Eagles (QMJHL)	—	—	—	—	—	—	—	—	—	—
2010	1	1	Taylor Hall	Canada	LW	Windsor Spitfires (OHL)	989	302	485	787	526	—	—	—	—	—
2010	2	31	Tyler Pitlick	United States	C	Minnesota State University, Mankato (WCHA)	420	56	53	109	102	—	—	—	—	—
2010	2	46	Martin Marincin	Slovakia	D	HC Kosice U20 (Jr. A Czech Extraliga)	227	5	29	34	110	—	—	—	—	—
2010	2	48	Curtis Hamilton	Canada	LW	Saskatoon Blades (WHL)	1	0	0	0	5	—	—	—	—	—
2010	3	61	Ryan Martindale	Canada	C	Ottawa 67's (OHL)	—	—	—	—	—	—	—	—	—	—
2010	4	91	Jeremie Blain	Canada	D	Acadie–Bathurst Titan (QMJHL)	—	—	—	—	—	—	—	—	—	—
2010	5	121	Tyler Bunz	Canada	G	Medicine Hat Tigers (WHL)	1	0	0	0	0	—	—	—	—	—
2010	6	162	Brandon Davidson	Canada	D	Regina Pats (WHL)	180	9	14	23	82	—	—	—	—	—
2010	6	166	Drew Czerwonka	Canada	LW	Kootenay Ice (WHL)	—	—	—	—	—	—	—	—	—	—
2010	7	181	Kristians Pelss	Latvia	LW	Dinmao-Juniors (Belarusian Extraleague)	—	—	—	—	—	—	—	—	—	—
2010	7	202	Kellen Jones	Canada	F	Vernon Vipers (BCHL)	—	—	—	—	—	—	—	—	—	—
2011	1	1	Ryan Nugent-Hopkins	Canada	C	Red Deer Rebels (WHL)	1031	291	513	804	355	—	—	—	—	—
2011	1	19	Oscar Klefbom	Sweden	D	Farjestad BK (Elitserien)	378	34	122	156	74	—	—	—	—	—
2011	2	31	David Musil	Czech Republic	D	Vancouver Giants (WHL)	4	0	2	2	2	—	—	—	—	—
2011	3	62	Samu Perhonen	Finland	G	JYP U20 (Jr. A SM-liiga)	—	—	—	—	—	—	—	—	—	—
2011	3	74	Travis Ewanyk	Canada	C	Edmonton Oil Kings (WHL)	—	—	—	—	—	—	—	—	—	—
2011	4	92	Dillon Simpson	Canada	D	University of North Dakota (WCHA)	3	0	0	0	2	—	—	—	—	—
2011	4	114	Tobias Rieder	Germany	RW	Kitchener Rangers (OHL)	478	64	81	145	52	—	—	—	—	—
2011	5	122	Martin Gernat	Slovakia	D	HC Kosice U20 (Jr. A Czech Extraliga)	—	—	—	—	—	—	—	—	—	—
2011	7	182	Frans Tuohimaa	Finland	G	Jokerit U20 (Jr. A SM-liiga)	—	—	—	—	—	—	—	—	—	—
2012	1	1	Nail Yakupov	Russia	RW	Sarnia Sting (OHL)	350	62	74	136	142	—	—	—	—	—
2012	2	32	Mitchell Moroz	Canada	LW	Edmonton Oil Kings (WHL)	—	—	—	—	—	—	—	—	—	—
2012	3	63	Jujhar Khaira	Canada	LW	Prince George Spruce Kings (BCHL)	337	33	47	80	229	—	—	—	—	—
2012	3	91	Daniil Zharkov	Russia	LW	Belleville Bulls (OHL)	—	—	—	—	—	—	—	—	—	—
2012	4	93	Erik Gustafsson	Sweden	D	Djurgardens IF (Elitserien)	517	47	193	240	165	—	—	—	—	—
2012	5	123	Joey LaLeggia	Canada	D	Denver Pioneers (WCHA)	—	—	—	—	—	—	—	—	—	—
2012	6	153	John McCarron	United States	RW	Cornell University (ECAC)	—	—	—	—	—	—	—	—	—	—
2013	1	7	Darnell Nurse	Canada	D	Sault Ste. Marie Greyhounds (OHL)	798	88	236	324	725	—	—	—	—	—
2013	2	56	Marc-Olivier Roy	Canada	C	Blainville-Boisbriand Armada (QMJHL)	—	—	—	—	—	—	—	—	—	—
2013	3	83	Bogdan Yakimov	Russia	C	JHC Reaktor (MHL)	1	0	0	0	0	—	—	—	—	—
2013	3	88	Anton Slepyshev	Russia	LW	Salavat Yulaev Ufa (KHL)	102	10	13	23	14	—	—	—	—	—
2013	4	94	Jackson Houck	Canada	RW	Vancouver Giants (WHL)	—	—	—	—	—	—	—	—	—	—
2013	4	96	Kyle Platzer	Canada	C	London Knights (OHL)	—	—	—	—	—	—	—	—	—	—
2013	4	113	Aidan Muir	Canada	LW	Victory Honda (MWEHL)	—	—	—	—	—	—	—	—	—	—
2013	5	128	Evan Campbell	Canada	LW	Langley Rivermen (BCHL)	—	—	—	—	—	—	—	—	—	—
2013	6	158	Ben Betker	Canada	D	Everett Silvertips (WHL)	—	—	—	—	—	—	—	—	—	—
2013	7	188	Gregory Chase	Canada	C	Calgary Hitmen (WHL)	—	—	—	—	—	—	—	—	—	—
2014	1	3	Leon Draisaitl	Germany	C	Prince Albert Raiders (WHL)	855	434	619	1053	366	—	—	—	—	—
2014	4	91	William Lagesson	Sweden	D	Frolunda HC U20 (SuperElit)	107	0	12	12	58	—	—	—	—	—
2014	4	111	Zachary Nagelvoort	United States	G	University of Michigan (Big Ten)	—	—	—	—	—	—	—	—	—	—
2014	5	130	Liam Coughlin	United States	C/LW	Vernon Vipers (BCHL)	—	—	—	—	—	—	—	—	—	—
2014	6	153	Tyler Vesel	United States	C	Omaha Lancers (USHL)	—	—	—	—	—	—	—	—	—	—
2014	7	183	Keven Bouchard	Canada	G	Val-d'Or Foreurs (QMJHL)	—	—	—	—	—	—	—	—	—	—
2015	1	1	Connor McDavid	Canada	C	Erie Otters (OHL)	794	409	811	1220	330	—	—	—	—	—
2015	4	117	Caleb Jones	United States	D	U.S. National Team Development Program (USHL)	255	14	42	56	90	—	—	—	—	—
2015	5	124	Ethan Bear	Canada	D	Seattle Thunderbirds (WHL)	275	17	50	67	112	—	—	—	—	—
2015	6	154	John Marino	United States	D	South Shore Kings (USPHL)	443	23	134	157	130	—	—	—	—	—
2015	7	208	Miroslav Svoboda	Czech Republic	G	Ocelari Trinec U20 (Jr. A Czech Extraliga)	—	—	—	—	—	—	—	—	—	—
2015	7	209	Ziyat Paigin	Russia	D	Ak Bars Kazan (KHL)	—	—	—	—	—	—	—	—	—	—
2016	1	4	Jesse Puljujarvi	Finland	RW	Oulun Karpat (Liiga)	387	58	70	128	139	—	—	—	—	—
2016	2	32	Tyler Benson	Canada	LW	Vancouver Giants (WHL)	38	1	2	3	18	—	—	—	—	—
2016	3	63	Markus Niemelainen	Finland	D	Saginaw Spirit (OHL)	43	0	1	1	8	—	—	—	—	—
2016	3	84	Matthew Cairns	Canada	D	Georgetown Raiders (OJHL)	—	—	—	—	—	—	—	—	—	—
2016	3	91	Filip Berglund	Sweden	D	Skelleftea AIK (SuperElit)	—	—	—	—	—	—	—	—	—	—
2016	5	123	Dylan Wells	Canada	G	Peterborough Petes (OHL)	1	0	0	0	0	0	0	—	0	3.00
2016	5	149	Graham McPhee	United States	LW	U.S. National Team Development Program (USHL)	—	—	—	—	—	—	—	—	—	—
2016	6	153	Aapeli Rasanen	Finland	C	Tappara (Liiga)	—	—	—	—	—	—	—	—	—	—
2016	7	183	Vincent Desharnais	Canada	D	Providence College (Hockey East)	218	2	24	26	198	—	—	—	—	—
2017	1	22	Kailer Yamamoto	United States	RW	Spokane Chiefs (WHL)	374	73	87	160	140	—	—	—	—	—
2017	3	78	Stuart Skinner	Canada	G	Lethbridge Hurricanes (WHL)	224	0	2	2	0	121	71	—	23	2.77
2017	3	84	Dmitri Samorukov	Russia	D	Guelph Storm (OHL)	3	0	0	0	2	—	—	—	—	—
2017	4	115	Ostap Safin	Czech Republic	RW	Sparta Prague (Czech Extraliga)	—	—	—	—	—	—	—	—	—	—
2017	5	146	Kirill Maksimov	Russia	RW	Niagara IceDogs (OHL)	—	—	—	—	—	—	—	—	—	—
2017	6	177	Skyler Brind'Amour	United States	C	Selects Academy (USPHL)	6	1	0	1	4	—	—	—	—	—
2017	7	208	Philip Kemp	United States	D	U.S. National Team Development Program (USHL)	1	0	0	0	0	—	—	—	—	—
2018	1	10	Evan Bouchard	Canada	D	London Knights (OHL)	429	76	257	333	154	—	—	—	—	—
2018	2	40	Ryan McLeod	Canada	C	Mississauga Steelheads (OHL)	379	66	116	182	72	—	—	—	—	—
2018	2	62	Olivier Rodrigue	Canada	G	Drummondville Voltigeurs (QMJHL)	2	0	0	0	0	0	1	—	0	3.10
2018	6	164	Michael Kesselring	United States	D	New Hampton School (USHS)	190	12	43	55	211	—	—	—	—	—
2018	7	195	Patrik Siikanen	Finland	C	Espoo Blues U20 (Jr. A SM-liiga)	—	—	—	—	—	—	—	—	—	—
2019	1	8	Philip Broberg	Sweden	D	Skellefteå AIK (SHL)	230	16	60	76	42	—	—	—	—	—
2019	2	38	Raphael Lavoie	Canada	C	Halifax Mooseheads (QMJHL)	17	0	0	0	4	—	—	—	—	—
2019	3	85	Ilya Konovalov	Russia	G	Lokomotiv Yaroslavl (KHL)	—	—	—	—	—	—	—	—	—	—
2019	4	100	Matej Blumel	Czech Republic	LW	Waterloo Black Hawks (USHL)	17	2	0	2	0	—	—	—	—	—
2019	6	162	Tomas Mazura	Czech Republic	C	Kimball Union Academy (USHS)	—	—	—	—	—	—	—	—	—	—
2019	7	193	Maxim Denezhkin	Russia	C	Loko Yaroslavl (MHL)	—	—	—	—	—	—	—	—	—	—
2020	1	14	Dylan Holloway	Canada	C	University of Wisconsin (WCHA)	225	57	75	132	86	—	—	—	—	—
2020	4	100	Carter Savoie	Canada	LW	Sherwood Park Crusaders (AJHL)	—	—	—	—	—	—	—	—	—	—
2020	5	126	Tyler Tullio	Canada	C/RW	Oshawa Generals (OHL)	—	—	—	—	—	—	—	—	—	—
2020	5	138	Maxim Beryozkin	Russia	LW	Lokomotiv Yaroslavl (KHL)	—	—	—	—	—	—	—	—	—	—
2020	6	169	Filip Engaras	Sweden	C	University of New Hampshire (Hockey East)	—	—	—	—	—	—	—	—	—	—
2020	7	200	Jeremias Lindewall	Sweden	LW	Modo Hockey (HockeyAllsvenskan)	—	—	—	—	—	—	—	—	—	—
2021	1	22	Xavier Bourgault	Canada	C	Shawinigan Cataractes (QMJHL)	2	0	0	0	0	—	—	—	—	—
2021	3	90	Luca Munzenberger	Germany	D	Kölner Haie U20 (DNL)	—	—	—	—	—	—	—	—	—	—
2021	4	116	Jake Chiasson	Canada	C	Brandon Wheat Kings (WHL)	—	—	—	—	—	—	—	—	—	—
2021	6	180	Matvey Petrov	Russia	LW	Krylya Sovetov Moscow (MHL)	—	—	—	—	—	—	—	—	—	—
2021	6	186	Shane Lachance	United States	LW	Boston Junior Bruins (USPHL)	1	0	0	0	0	—	—	—	—	—
2021	7	212	Maximus Wanner	Canada	D	Moose Jaw Warriors (WHL)	—	—	—	—	—	—	—	—	—	—
2022	1	32	Reid Schaefer	Canada	LW	Seattle Thunderbirds (WHL)	47	6	2	8	17	—	—	—	—	—
2022	5	158	Samuel Jonsson	Sweden	G	Brynas J20 (J20 Nationell)	—	—	—	—	—	—	—	—	—	—
2022	6	190	Nikita Yevseyev	Russia	D	Bars Kazan (VHL)	—	—	—	—	—	—	—	—	—	—
2022	7	222	Joel Maatta	Finland	C	University of Vermont (Hockey East)	—	—	—	—	—	—	—	—	—	—
2023	2	56	Beau Akey	Canada	D	Barrie Colts (OHL)	—	—	—	—	—	—	—	—	—	—
2023	6	184	Nathaniel Day	Canada	G	Flint Firebirds (OHL)	—	—	—	—	—	—	—	—	—	—
2023	7	216	Matt Copponi	United States	C	Merrimack College (Hockey East)	—	—	—	—	—	—	—	—	—	—
2024	1	32	Sam O'Reilly	Canada	RW	London Knights (OHL)	—	—	—	—	—	—	—	—	—	—
2024	2	64	Eemil Vinni	Finland	G	Kiekko-Pojat (Mestis)	—	—	—	—	—	—	—	—	—	—
2024	5	160	Connor Clattenburg	Canada	LW	Flint Firebirds (OHL)	5	1	0	1	13	—	—	—	—	—
2024	6	160	Albin Sundin	Sweden	D	Frolunda HC U20 (J20 Nationell)	—	—	—	—	—	—	—	—	—	—
2024	6	192	Dalyn Wakely	Canada	C	North Bay Battalion (OHL)	—	—	—	—	—	—	—	—	—	—
2024	7	196	William Nicholl	Canada	C	London Knights (OHL)	—	—	—	—	—	—	—	—	—	—
2024	7	219	Bauer Berry	United States	D	Muskegon Lumberjacks (USHL)	—	—	—	—	—	—	—	—	—	—
2025	3	83	Tommy Lafreniere	Canada	RW	Kamloops Blazers (WHL)	—	—	—	—	—	—	—	—	—	—
2025	4	117	David Lewandowski	Germany	LW	Saskatoon Blades (WHL)	—	—	—	—	—	—	—	—	—	—
2025	5	131	Asher Barnett	United States	D	U.S. National Team Development Program (USHL)	—	—	—	—	—	—	—	—	—	—
2025	6	191	Daniel Salonen	Finland	G	Lukko (SM-liiga)	—	—	—	—	—	—	—	—	—	—
2025	7	223	Aidan Park	United States	C	Green Bay Gamblers (USHL)	—	—	—	—	—	—	—	—	—	—
2026	2	58	Rudolfs Berzkalns	Latvia	C	Muskegon Lumberjacks (USHL)	—	—	—	—	—	—	—	—	—	—
2026	3	84	Malcom Gastrin	Sweden	LW	Modo Hockey U20 (J20 Nationell)	—	—	—	—	—	—	—	—	—	—
2026	5	133	Andrew Robinson	Canada	D	Windsor Spitfires (OHL)	—	—	—	—	—	—	—	—	—	—
2026	6	180	Caden Harvey	United States	C	Windsor Spitfires (OHL)	—	—	—	—	—	—	—	—	—	—
2026	7	212	Ryan Cameron	United States	G	Cedar Rapids RoughRiders (USHL)	—	—	—	—	—	—	—	—	—	—

== See also ==
- List of Edmonton Oilers players
- 1979 NHL Expansion Draft
