= Clattenburg =

Clattenburg is a surname. Notable people with the surname include:

- Connor Clattenburg (born 2005), Canadian ice hockey player
- Mark Clattenburg (born 1975), English football referee
- Mike Clattenburg (born 1967), Canadian television and film director, producer, and screenwriter
