= Stan Butler =

Canadian ice hockey coach (born 1956)

- Born: February 2, 1956 (age 70) East York, Ontario, Canada
- Coached for: Oshawa Generals; Prince George Cougars; Brampton / North Bay Battalion; Erie Otters
- Coaching career: 1994–2025

Stan Butler (born February 2, 1956) is a Canadian former ice hockey coach and general manager. He served as the only head coach and general manager in the franchise history of the Brampton Battalion and North Bay Battalion, from 1998 to 2019. He has spent his entire professional coaching career in junior ice hockey, and on two occasions, Butler has also served as the head coach of the Canada men's national junior ice hockey team.

As of the 2019–20 OHL season, he was the longest tenured head coach in the OHL with one team. Butler also coached the Oshawa Generals, Prince George Cougars, and Erie Otters. In total, he coached 1,720 OHL games and won 798, and two appearances in the J. Ross Robertson Cup finals. In 28 seasons in the Canadian Hockey League, Butler has 826 coaching wins.

== Career ==
Butler began coaching minor ice hockey in 1985 with Wexford and led his peewee, bantam and midget teams to four City of Toronto and three Ontario provincial championships. In 1989 he was named the Canadian Amateur Hockey Association's coach of the year. Butler subsequently coached for the Wexford Raiders in the Metro Junior A Hockey League for 5 seasons from 1989–90 to 1993–94.

Butler broke into the OHL when hired by the Oshawa Generals. In the 1994–95 OHL season the team had a record of 40-21-5 for 85 points and set a CHL record when 10 players were chosen in the 1995 NHL entry draft. After the 1995–96 OHL season the Generals won 30 games and tallied 68 points.

Butler moved to Prince George, British Columbia, to coach the Prince George Cougars for the 1996–97 WHL season. The Cougars made the playoffs for the first time in seven years, losing in the third round of the Western Hockey League playoffs after defeating the first place Portland Winter Hawks and third place Spokane Chiefs in the first two rounds.

Butler returned to the OHL and began his tenure with the Brampton Battalion as an expansion franchise in the 1998–99 OHL season. The Battalion were led in scoring that season by underage 15–year old Jason Spezza, and fellow future NHL player Raffi Torres. The inaugural Battalion season was one of only two seasons Butler's troops failed to make the playoffs.

In the 15 seasons Butler coached in Brampton, the Battalion won four Central division Emms Trophy titles in 2002–03, 2005–06, 2007–08, 2008–09, and one Eastern conference Bobby Orr Trophy title in the 2008–09 OHL season. Butler coached his 1000th game in the OHL on February 10, 2011. Butler was inducted to the Brampton Sports Hall of Fame in 2012.

Butler moved to North Bay with the Battalion for the 2013–14 OHL season and won the Eastern conference Bobby Orr Trophy. Butler earned his 600th victory in the OHL on February 1, 2015, with a 3–2 win against the Niagara IceDogs. Butler earned his 700th victory in the OHL on March 2, 2018, with a 2–1 win against the Mississauga Steelheads.

On December 10, 2019, the team announced that Butler had been reassigned as a special advisor to the team owner. Adam Dennis was named the new general manager, and Ryan Oulahen was named the interim head coach. As of that date, Butler had coached 1,660 games in the Canadian Hockey League, and earned 765 wins. He ranked fourth overall in wins by Ontario Hockey League coaches, behind Brian Kilrea, Bert Templeton and Dale Hunter; and ranked third in games coached behind Kilrea and Templeton. Butler spent 22 consecutive seasons with the Battalion, which was the longest single-team-tenure in OHL history as of 2023.

Butler became head coach of the Erie Otters on January 26, 2023, pending immigration to the United States. His first game as coach for the Otters was a 5–1 loss versus the London Knights on February 4, 2023. He remained with the Otters until January 16, 2025, when he took a leave of absence as the organization investigated a breach in "team policy". On January 27, the Otters found that Butler had violated policy and fired him, declining specific comments. Butler concluded his tenure with the Otters with a 57–58–13 record.

== National coaching duties ==
He was named an assistant coach for Canada men's national under-18 ice hockey team that won a gold medal at the 1998 Three Nations Tournament in the Czech Republic, and served as head coach of Canada men's national under-18 ice hockey team that won the gold medal at the 1999 Four Nations tournament in the Czech Republic.

Butler was named an assistant coach to Tom Renney for Canada men's national junior ice hockey team at the 1999 World Junior Ice Hockey Championships in Winnipeg. Canada claimed a silver medal, losing to team Russia in the final. Butler returned to the national stage after a year off, as head coach of the Canadian juniors 2001 World Junior Ice Hockey Championships held in Russia. Canada defeated team Sweden in the bronze medal game, with Battalion member Raffi Torres scoring in overtime. Butler returned for a second consecutive stint as head coach of the juniors for 2002 World Junior Ice Hockey Championships held in the Czech Republic. Butler became only the third person in Canadian Hockey Association history to coach the national junior team in consecutive years since the CHA’s Program of Excellence began in 1982. Canada earned a silver medal after losing 5-4 to Russia in the championship game.

Butler returned to international hockey after 13 years, leading the under-18 national team to an eighth straight gold medal at the 2015 Ivan Hlinka Memorial Tournament in the Czech Republic.

== Personal life ==
Butler was born in East York, Ontario. He graduated from Brock University in 1979 with a bachelor's degree in physical education, completed a bachelor's degree in education at the University of Toronto in 1980, and earned his master's degree in education at Brock in 1988.

Butler has two children, Sara and Adam. He cites the desire to have a normal schedule for his children as the reason he never pursued an NHL coaching career.

== Coaching record ==
Canadian Hockey League coaching record

Note: GP = Games played; W = Wins; L = Losses; T = Ties; OTL = Overtime Losses; SL = Shootout Losses; PTS = Points

Team	Year	League	Regular season								Postseason
Team	Year	League	G	W	L	T	OTL	SL	Pts	Finish	Result
Oshawa Generals	1994–95	OHL	66	40	21	5	—	—	85	2nd East	Lost in division quarter-finals (3-4 vs. PBO)
Oshawa Generals	1995–96	OHL	66	30	28	8	—	—	68	4th East	Lost in division quarter-finals (1-4 vs. BEL)
Prince George Cougars	1996–97	WHL	72	28	39	5	—	—	61	6th West	Won in division quarter-finals (4-2 vs. POR); Won in division semi-finals (3-0 vs. SPO); Lost in division finals (2-4 vs. SEA)
Brampton Battalion	1998–99	OHL	68	8	57	3	—	—	19	5th Midwest	Did not qualify
Brampton Battalion	1999–2000	OHL	68	25	28	11	4	—	65	3rd Midwest	Lost in conference quarter-finals (2-4 vs. ERI)
Brampton Battalion	2000–01	OHL	68	33	22	9	4	—	79	3rd Midwest	Won in conference quarter-finals (4-0 vs. GUE); Lost in conference semi-finals (1-4 vs. ERI)
Brampton Battalion	2001–02	OHL	68	26	35	5	2	—	59	5th Midwest	Did not qualify
Brampton Battalion	2002–03	OHL	68	34	24	6	4	—	78	1st Central	Won in conference quarter-finals (4-2 vs. BAR); Lost in conference semi-finals (1-4 vs. TOR)
Brampton Battalion	2003–04	OHL	68	25	32	9	2	—	61	4th Central	Won in conference quarter-finals (4-3 vs. OTT); Lost in conference semi-finals (1-4 vs. TOR)
Brampton Battalion	2004–05	OHL	68	33	24	9	2	—	77	3rd Central	Lost in conference quarter-finals (2-4 vs. SBY)
Brampton Battalion	2005–06	OHL	68	44	21	—	1	2	91	1st Central	Won in conference quarter-finals (4-2 vs. BEL); Lost in conference semi-finals (1-4 vs. BAR)
Brampton Battalion	2006–07	OHL	68	27	36	—	1	4	59	4th Central	Lost in conference quarter-finals (0-4 vs. BAR)
Brampton Battalion	2007–08	OHL	68	42	22	—	1	3	88	1st Central	Lost in conference quarter-finals (1-4 vs. BAR)
Brampton Battalion	2008–09	OHL	68	47	19	—	1	1	96	1st Central	Won in conference quarter-finals (4-0 vs. PBO); Won in conference semi-finals (4-2 vs. MIS); Won in conference finals (4-2 vs. BEL); Lost in J. Ross Robertson Cup (1-4 vs. WSR)
Brampton Battalion	2009–10	OHL	68	25	29	—	7	7	64	3rd Central	Won in conference quarter-finals (4-3 vs. KGN); Lost in conference semi-finals (0-4 vs. BAR)
Brampton Battalion	2010–11	OHL	68	29	32	—	1	6	65	3rd Central	Lost in conference quarter-finals (0-4 vs. NIA)
Brampton Battalion	2011–12	OHL	68	36	22	—	3	7	82	3rd Central	Won in conference quarter-finals (4-0 vs SBY); Lost in conference semi-finals (0-4 vs. NIA)
Brampton Battalion	2012–13	OHL	68	34	25	—	3	6	77	2nd Central	Lost in conference quarter-finals (1-4 vs. SBY)
North Bay Battalion	2013–14	OHL	68	38	24	—	4	2	82	1st Central	Won in conference quarter-finals (4-3 vs. NIA); Won in conference semi-finals (4-2 vs. BAR); Won in conference finals (4-0 vs. OSH); Lost in J. Ross Robertson Cup (1-4 vs. GUE)
North Bay Battalion	2014–15	OHL	68	37	20	—	6	5	85	2nd Central	Won in conference quarter-finals (4-0 vs. KGN); Won in conference semi-finals (4-1 vs. BAR); Lost in conference finals (2-4 vs. OSH)
North Bay Battalion	2015–16	OHL	68	35	23	—	6	4	80	2nd Central	Won in conference quarter-finals (4-3 vs. PBO); Lost in conference semi-finals (0-4 vs. BAR)
North Bay Battalion	2016–17	OHL	68	24	38	—	5	1	54	4th Central	Did not qualify
North Bay Battalion	2017–18	OHL	68	30	28	—	7	3	70	3rd Central	Lost in conference quarter-finals (1-4 vs. KGN)
North Bay Battalion	2018–19	OHL	68	30	33	—	3	2	65	4th Central	Lost in conference quarter-finals (1-4 vs. NIA)
North Bay Battalion	2019–20	OHL	28	5	23	—	0	0	10	(5th Central)	Fired on December 10, 2019
Erie Otters	2022–23	OHL	23	5	16	—	1	1	12	5th Midwest	Did not qualify
Erie Otters	2023–24	OHL	68	33	28	—	5	2	73	3rd Midwest	Lost in conference quarter-finals (2-4 vs. KIT)
Erie Otters	2024–25	OHL	41	23	15	—	3	0	49	(3rd Midwest)	Fired on January 27, 2025
TOTALS		OHL	1720	798	725	65	76	56	1744	5 division titles	2 finals appearances
TOTALS		WHL	72	28	39	5	—	—	61	—	—
TOTALS		CHL	1792	826	764	70	76	56	1854	5 division titles	2 finals appearances
