= François Leroux =

Canadian ice hockey player (born 1970)

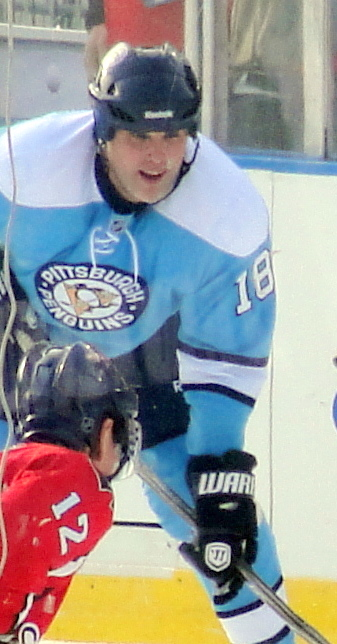
- Leroux at the Alumni Game in Pittsburgh, December 2010
- Born: April 18, 1970 (age 56) Sainte-Adèle, Québec, Canada
- Height: 6 ft 6 in (198 cm)
- Weight: 247 lb (112 kg; 17 st 9 lb)
- Position: Defence
- Shot: Left
- Played for: Edmonton Oilers; Ottawa Senators; Pittsburgh Penguins; Colorado Avalanche
- NHL draft: 19th overall, 1988; Edmonton Oilers
- Playing career: 1988–2003; 2006–2019

François Leroux (born April 18, 1970) is a Canadian former professional ice hockey player. At 6'6" and over 240 pounds, Leroux was a physical, defensive-minded defenceman who amassed 577 penalty minutes in his NHL career. In his NHL career, he played with the Edmonton Oilers, Ottawa Senators, Pittsburgh Penguins and Colorado Avalanche.

== Playing career ==
A first-round draft choice of the Edmonton Oilers in the 1988 NHL entry draft, Leroux made his NHL debut with the Edmonton Oilers during the 1988–89 season, playing two games. He split time between Cape Breton and Edmonton from 1989 to 1993. On September 17, 1990, in his first pre-season game, Leroux fought Wendel Clark of the Toronto Maple Leafs. On January 4, 1991, Leroux's first regular season fight as a pro came in the American Hockey League (AHL) as a member of the Cape Breton Oilers where he took on Brent Grieve of the Capital District Islanders. On March 24, 1992, Leroux received his first NHL fighting major after fighting Tim Hunter of the Calgary Flames. Leroux claimed on waivers by the Ottawa Senators on October 6, 1993. Leroux played 23 games for the Senators before being sent down to the Prince Edward Island Senators in the AHL, where he remained until the completion of the 1993–94 season. On January 18, 1995, the Pittsburgh Penguins claimed Leroux in the NHL Waiver Draft. On March 26, 1996, Leroux beat St. Louis Blues forward Tony Twist in a fight. Leroux received a match penalty for the fight, and it was determined that he had tape over his knuckles before fighting. Prior to the start of the 1997–98 season, Leroux was traded to the Colorado Avalanche for a third-round pick in the 1998 NHL Entry Draft.

Following his stint with the Colorado Avalanche, Leroux was not offered an NHL contract. He later played for the Grand Rapids Griffins of the International Hockey League and the Springfield Falcons of the AHL. He later spent one season in the German Elite League playing for Berlin Capitals.

The Penguins signed Leroux to a two-way contract on July 16, 2002. Leroux played 57 games for the Wilkes-Barre/Scranton Penguins before being traded, along with Jan Hrdina to the Phoenix Coyotes for three prospects (forwards Ramzi Abid and Guillaume Lefebvre, and defenceman Dan Focht) on March 16, 2003. Leroux made a second stop at Springfield, as they were now the Coyotes' AHL affiliate. He played six games before announcing his retirement from the NHL on September 6, 2003.

== Post-retirement ==
On February 2, 2006, Leroux was lured out of retirement by the Saint-Jean Summum Chiefs of the Ligue Nord-Américaine de Hockey (LNAH), which had the reputation as "the world’s roughest hockey league." He picked up 42 penalty minutes with the Chiefs. On November 21, 2007, after practicing on and off with the team, Leroux signed with the Wheeling Nailers of the ECHL.

On July 17, 2008, Leroux assumed the position of Commissioner of the Mid-Atlantic Hockey League (MAHL). Leroux's role as league commissioner included hosting a weekly MAHL radio show and representing the league at regular season and post-season games. Leroux's tenure as commissioner was short-lived however, with the MAHL disbanding on September 23, 2008.

== Career statistics ==
			Regular season					Playoffs
Season	Team	League	GP	G	A	Pts	PIM	GP	G	A	Pts	PIM
1986–87	Laval Régents	QMAAA	42	5	11	16	76	8	0	1	1	12
1987–88	Saint-Jean Castors	QMJHL	58	3	8	11	143	7	0	2	2	21
1988–89	Saint-Jean Castors	QMJHL	57	8	34	42	185	—	—	—	—	—
1988–89	Edmonton Oilers	NHL	2	0	0	0	0	—	—	—	—	—
1989–90	Saint-Jean Castors	QMJHL	41	4	28	32	122	—	—	—	—	—
1989–90	Victoriaville Tigres	QMJHL	13	0	5	5	38	—	—	—	—	—
1989–90	Edmonton Oilers	NHL	3	0	1	1	0	—	—	—	—	—
1990–91	Cape Breton Oilers	AHL	71	2	7	9	124	4	0	1	1	19
1990–91	Edmonton Oilers	NHL	1	0	2	2	0	—	—	—	—	—
1991–92	Cape Breton Oilers	AHL	61	7	22	29	114	5	0	0	0	8
1991–92	Edmonton Oilers	NHL	4	0	0	0	7	—	—	—	—	—
1992–93	Cape Breton Oilers	AHL	55	10	24	34	139	16	0	5	5	29
1992–93	Edmonton Oilers	NHL	1	0	0	0	4	—	—	—	—	—
1993–94	PEI Senators	AHL	25	4	6	10	52	—	—	—	—	—
1993–94	Ottawa Senators	NHL	23	0	1	1	70	—	—	—	—	—
1994–95	PEI Senators	AHL	45	4	14	18	137	—	—	—	—	—
1994–95	Pittsburgh Penguins	NHL	40	0	2	2	114	12	0	2	2	14
1995–96	Pittsburgh Penguins	NHL	66	2	9	11	161	18	1	1	2	20
1996–97	Pittsburgh Penguins	NHL	59	0	3	3	81	3	0	0	0	0
1997–98	Colorado Avalanche	NHL	50	1	2	3	140	—	—	—	—	—
1998–99	Grand Rapids Griffins	IHL	13	1	1	2	22	—	—	—	—	—
1999–2000	Springfield Falcons	AHL	64	3	6	9	162	5	0	0	0	2
2000–01	Springfield Falcons	AHL	65	4	6	10	180	—	—	—	—	—
2001–02	Berlin Capitals	DEL	56	1	10	11	110	—	—	—	—	—
2002–03	Wilkes-Barre/Scranton Penguins	AHL	57	1	3	4	124	—	—	—	—	—
2002–03	Springfield Falcons	AHL	6	0	0	0	0	6	0	1	1	2
2006–07	Saint-Jean Chiefs	LNAH	12	0	0	0	42	12	0	3	3	24
2007–08	Saint-Jean Chiefs	LNAH	20	0	3	3	74	6	1	1	2	10
2007–08	Wheeling Nailers	ECHL	28	0	1	1	50	—	—	—	—	—
NHL totals			249	3	20	23	577	33	1	3	4	34

== Awards and honours ==
Award	Year
AHL
Calder Cup (Cape Breton Oilers)	1992–93

Awards and achievements
Preceded by Peter Soberlak	Edmonton Oilers first-round draft pick 1988	Succeeded by Jason Soules
