= North Bay Battalion =

Ontario Hockey League team in North Bay

- City: North Bay, Ontario
- League: Ontario Hockey League
- Conference: Eastern
- Division: Central
- Founded: 1996
- Home arena: Boart Longyear Memorial Gardens
- Colours: Khaki green, yellow, black, and white
- General manager: John Winstanley
- Head coach: Ryan Oulahen
- Affiliates: Powassan Voodoos (2021–present) (NOJHL)
- Website: battalionhockey.com

Franchise history
- 1998–2013: Brampton Battalion
- 2013–present: North Bay Battalion

Current uniform

The North Bay Battalion are a junior ice hockey team in the Ontario Hockey League based in North Bay, Ontario, Canada. The franchise was founded as the Brampton Battalion on December 3, 1996, and began play in 1998. The team relocated to North Bay prior to the 2013–14 OHL season.

== History ==
=== Early years, 1998–2013 ===
The Brampton Battalion's inaugural season began in 1998–99, choosing the Battalion name from community suggestions, and was also adopted by the competitive minor hockey program in Brampton. The team struggled in its first season, winning only 8 of 68 games. However, it would be one of only two seasons (the other being 2001–02) in which the Brampton Battalion would miss the playoffs. The fifteen-season tenure in Brampton saw the Battalion finish with a .484 win percentage in 1,020 regular season games and win four Central Division Championships and one Eastern Conference Championship.

=== Relocation ===
During the summer of 2012, it was rumoured the Battalion franchise would relocate as their lease agreement with the Powerade Centre was nearing an end. Attendance was consistently low and declining in Brampton as well as an unfavourable lease. On November 5, 2012, an agreement in principle to move the Battalion to North Bay for the 2013–14 season was agreed upon following a meeting with the city council in North Bay. Nine days later, fans in North Bay had already bought over 2,000 season tickets as per the conditions of the agreement. The Battalion would play out of the North Bay Memorial Gardens, which had to undergo major renovations in order to meet league standards. Franchise owner Scott Abbott stated that the team would continue to use the Battalion moniker in North Bay, paying homage to the city's strong military history.

=== 2013–14 ===
The Battalion began the 2013–14 season with a nine game road trip due to the ongoing renovations at the Memorial Gardens. On September 20, 2013, North Bay played in their first game, losing 5–2 to the Kingston Frontenacs. Mike Amadio scored the first goal for North Bay. The following night, the Battalion earned their first victory defeating the Belleville Bulls 4–1.

The Battalion played their first home game on October 11, losing 2–1 to the Peterborough Petes in front of a sold out crowd of 4,236. On October 14, the Battalion defeated the Niagara IceDogs 5–4 in a shootout for their first home win of the season.

North Bay's finished the 2013–14 season with the best record in the Central Division, going 38–24–4–2 and earning 82 points. North Bay averaged 3,366 fans per game during the season, which represented an increase of more than 1,200 fans per game than in their final season in Brampton.

In the post-season, the Battalion defeated the Niagara IceDogs in a close seven-game series, as North Bay won the seventh game by a 2–1 score in front of a sold out crowd of 4,249. The Battalion defeated the Barrie Colts in six games in the second round. In the third round, North Bay defeated the favoured Oshawa Generals with a four game sweep. The Battalion's run ended in the J. Ross Robertson Cup finals, losing to the Guelph Storm in five games.

=== 2014–15 ===
North Bay had another strong regular season in 2014–15, as the club earned a record of 37–20–6–5 and 85 points, a three-point improvement over their point total. The Battalion finished in second place in the Central Division. Nick Paul won the Dan Snyder Memorial Trophy, awarded to the OHL player who is a positive role model.

The Battalion had another long playoff run in 2015, as the club swept the Kingston Frontenacs in the first round, followed by a five-game series win over the Barrie Colts. The Battalion season ended in the Eastern Conference finals, as North Bay lost to the Oshawa Generals in six games.

=== 2015–16 ===
The Battalion had another solid regular season with a record of 35–23–6–4 for 80 points and second place in the Central Division in 2015–16 season. Mike Amadio was awarded the William Hanley Trophy, awarded to the most sportsmanlike player in the OHL. Amadio became the first Battalion player since the move to North Bay to score 50 goals in a season.

In the post-season, North Bay defeated the Peterborough Petes in seven games in the first round, winning the seventh game by a 4–1 score in front of 3,810 fans at home. The Battalion were then swept by the Barrie Colts in the second round.

=== 2016–17 ===
Following three straight seasons of 80+ points, the Battalion entered a rebuilding phase during the 2016–17 season. North Bay failed to qualify for the post-season, finishing ninth in the Eastern Conference with a 24–38–5–1 record and 54 points.

=== 2017–18 ===
The Battalion improved to a 30–28–7–3 record during the 2017–18 season, earning 70 points and returning to the post-season as the sixth place team in the Eastern Conference. In the post-season, the Battalion lost to the Kingston Frontenacs in six games. The third game of the series was moved from North Bay to the Sudbury Community Arena due to the 2018 Ford World Women's Curling Championship held at the North Bay Memorial Gardens. In game six of the series, goaltender Christian Propp made an impressive 71 saves, including 43 saves in overtime, as North Bay lost to the Frontenacs 6–5 in triple overtime.

=== 2018–19 ===
North Bay struggled during the 2018–19 season, however, the club qualified for the post-season for the fifth time in six seasons since their move from Brampton, as the club had a 30–33–3–2 record, earning 65 points and seventh place in the Eastern Conference. Justin Brazeau, in his final season with the Battalion, scored 61 goals and 113 points, leading the OHL in goals and finishing second in overall points. Brazeau won the Jim Mahon Memorial Trophy as the top scoring right winger in the OHL and the Leo Lalonde Memorial Trophy as the OHL overage player of the year.

In the post-season, the Battalion lost to the Niagara IceDogs in five games in the first round, making it the third consecutive season that the club did not advance past the first round of the playoffs.

=== 2019–20 ===
On December 10, 2019, the team announced that Stan Butler who had coached and managed the Battalion since its first game in Brampton had been reassigned as a special advisor to the team owner. Adam Dennis was named the new general manager, and Ryan Oulahen was named the interim head coach.

On March 24, 2020, the team announced that Ryan Oulahen was named the second head coach in North Bay Battalion history. Oulahen has agreed to a three-year contract to oversee a coaching staff that includes assistants Scott Wray and Bill Houlder.

== Championships ==
The North Bay Battalion have won two division titles and one conference championship in its first season in North Bay.

Emms Trophy
Central Division Champions

- 2013–14
- 2021–22
- 2022–23
- 2023–24

Bobby Orr Trophy
Eastern Conference Champions

- 2013–14

== Uniforms and logos ==
The Battalion's uniform is primarily an army-like shade of olive green. The shoulders feature black bars, with white outlining, this is then further outlined in black. Evenly between the shoulder and elbow lie three military-style chevrons, connoting rank (here, sergeant) completing armed forces theme.

The logo itself, featuring their mascot, Sarge, gritting his teeth is also army olive green, a mix of yellow and beige, white, fleshish pinky-orange, black, and red. The name Battalion, emblazoned on their uniform is pure red, and is created in a way that it looks three-dimensional.

== Arena ==
The North Bay Battalion play out of the Boart Longyear Memorial Gardens. Built in 1955, it is best known as the home of the North Bay Centennials from 1982 until 2002, after which they moved to Saginaw, Michigan, and became the Saginaw Spirit. Most recently, it has served as the home of the Northern Ontario Junior Hockey League's North Bay Trappers from 2002 until 2014, as well as the Nipissing University Lakers hockey team playing in Canadian Interuniversity Sport as a member of the Ontario University Athletics conference.

With the Battalion's arrival and subsequent 15-year lease, the Gardens underwent a $12 million renovation; the seating capacity increased to 4,246, the ice surface was reconfigured to new OHL standards, ten private boxes were added and a new two-level team dressing room was built.

== NHL alumni ==
List of North Bay Battalion alumni who played in the National Hockey League (NHL):

- Michael Amadio
- Justin Brazeau
- Cam Dineen
- Barclay Goodrow
- Nick Paul
- Ben Thomson
- Sandis Vilmanis

== Broadcasting ==
TVCogeco broadcasts home games, and away games that are televised. Greg Theberge is a commentator for the Battalion. Country 600 CKAT broadcasts Battalion games on radio.

== Season-by-season results ==
Regular season and playoffs results:

Legend: GP = Games played, W = Wins, L = Losses, OTL = Overtime losses, SL = Shoot-out losses, Pts = Points, GF = Goals for, GA = Goals against

Memorial Cup champions	OHL champions	OHL finalists

Season	Regular season										Playoffs
Season	GP	W	L	OTL	SOL	Pts	Pct	GF	GA	Finish	Playoffs
2013–14	68	38	24	4	2	82	0.603	220	189	1st Central	Won conference quarterfinal (Niagara IceDogs) 4–3; Won conference semifinal (Barrie Colts) 4–2; Won conference final (Oshawa Generals) 4–0; Lost OHL championship (Guelph Storm) 4–1
2014–15	68	37	20	6	5	85	0.625	237	195	2nd Central	Won conference quarterfinal (Kingston Frontenacs) 4–0; Won conference semifinal (Barrie Colts) 4–1; Lost conference final (Oshawa Generals) 4–2
2015–16	68	35	23	6	4	80	0.588	240	227	2nd Central	Won conference quarterfinal (Peterborough Petes) 4–3; Lost conference semifinal (Barrie Colts) 4–0
2016–17	68	24	38	5	1	54	0.397	192	260	4th Central	Did not qualify
2017–18	68	30	28	7	3	70	0.515	213	237	3rd Central	Lost conference quarterfinal (Kingston Frontenacs) 4–1
2018–19	68	30	33	3	2	65	0.478	230	281	4th Central	Lost conference quarterfinal (Niagara IceDogs) 4–1
2019–20	62	17	41	4	0	38	0.306	189	314	5th Central	Playoffs cancelled due to the COVID-19 pandemic
2020–21	Season cancelled due to the COVID-19 pandemic										
2021–22	68	43	18	3	4	93	0.684	267	198	1st Central	Won conference quarterfinal (Ottawa 67's) 4–0; Won conference semifinal (Kingston Frontenacs) 4–1; Lost conference final (Hamilton Bulldogs) 4–0
2022–23	68	48	17	2	1	99	0.728	285	183	1st Central	Won conference quarterfinal (Mississauga Steelheads) 4–2; Won conference semifinal (Barrie Colts 4–3; Lost conference final (Peterborough Petes) 4–3
2023–24	68	39	20	7	2	87	0.640	300	240	1st Central	Won conference quarterfinal (Kingston Frontenacs) 4–1; Won conference semifinal (Sudbury Wolves) 4–0; Lost conference final (Oshawa Generals) 4–3
2024–25	68	28	34	6	0	62	0.456	194	252	5th Central	Lost conference quarterfinal (Brantford Bulldogs) 4–1
2025–26	68	38	26	3	1	80	0.588	237	215	2nd Central	Won conference quarterfinal (Peterborough Petes) 4–2; Lost conference semifinal (Brantford Bulldogs) 4–0

== See also ==
- List of ice hockey teams in Ontario
