= Peter Soberlak =

Canadian ice hockey player

- Born: May 12, 1969 (age 57) Trail, British Columbia, Canada
- Height: 6 ft 3 in (191 cm)
- Weight: 196 lb (89 kg; 14 st 0 lb)
- Position: Left winger
- Played for: Cape Breton Oilers (AHL)
- NHL draft: 21st overall, 1987; Edmonton Oilers
- Playing career: 1989–1992

Peter Soberlak (born May 12, 1969, in Trail, British Columbia) is a former professional ice hockey left winger. He was drafted in the first round, 21st overall, by the Edmonton Oilers in the 1987 NHL entry draft. He never played in the National Hockey League, however.

== Career statistics ==
			Regular season					Playoffs
Season	Team	League	GP	G	A	Pts	PIM	GP	G	A	Pts	PIM
1985–86	Kamloops Blazers	WHL	55	10	11	21	46	3	1	1	2	9
1986–87	Kamloops Blazers	WHL	16	2	7	9	26	—	—	—	—	—
1986–87	Swift Current Broncos	WHL	52	31	35	66	19	—	—	—	—	—
1987–88	Swift Current Broncos	WHL	67	43	56	99	47	10	5	7	12	14
1988–89	Swift Current Broncos	WHL	37	25	33	58	21	12	5	11	16	11
1989–90	Cape Breton Oilers	AHL	60	15	8	23	22	—	—	—	—	—
1990–91	Cape Breton Oilers	AHL	70	18	18	36	17	—	—	—	—	—
1991–92	Cape Breton Oilers	AHL	22	4	7	11	25	—	—	—	—	—
AHL totals			152	37	33	70	64	—	—	—	—	—

Preceded by Kim Issel	Edmonton Oilers first-round draft pick 1987	Succeeded by François Leroux
