= Ted Dent =

Canadian ice hockey player and coach

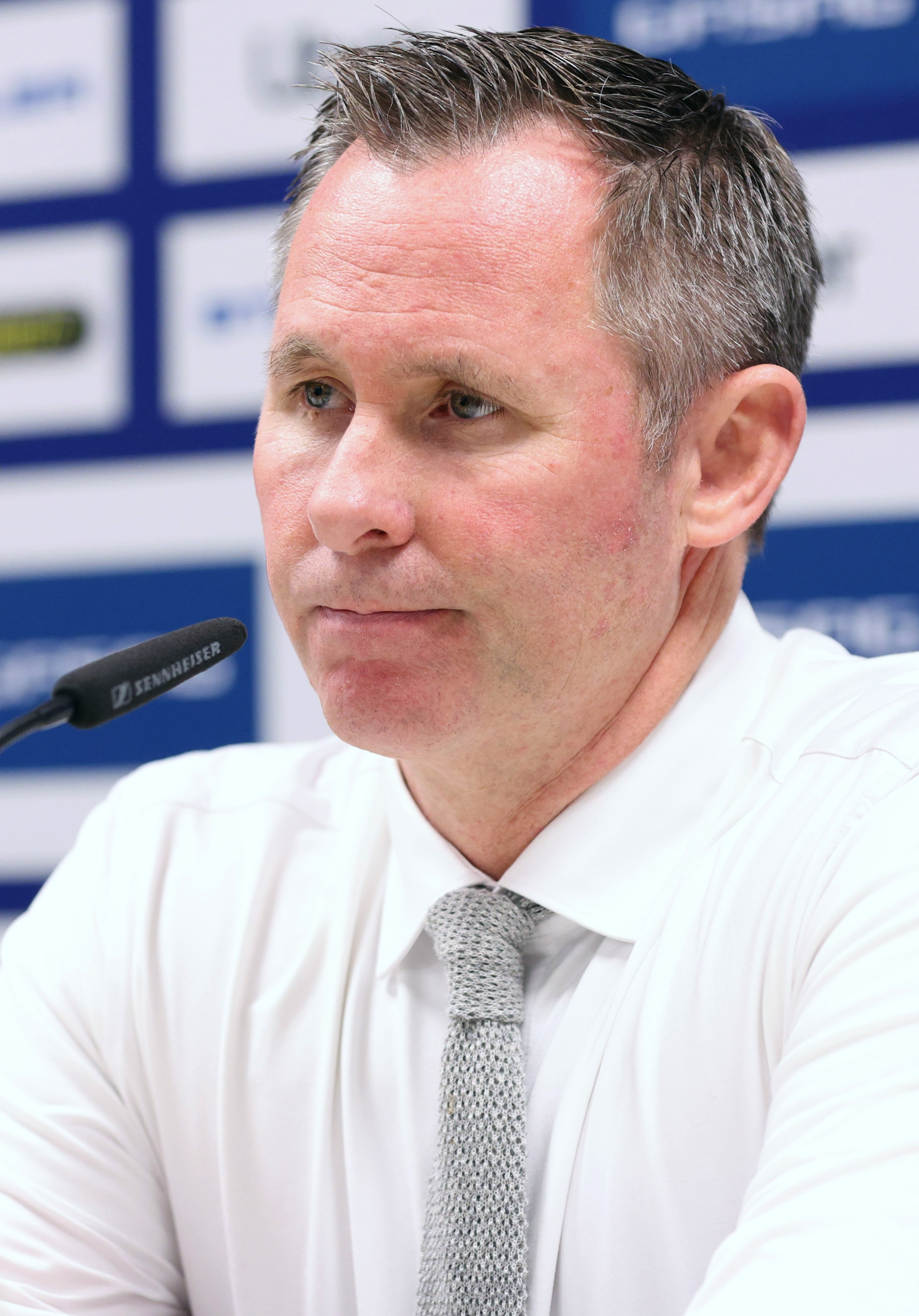
- Ted Dent in 2024
- Born: November 5, 1969 (age 56) Toronto, Ontario, Canada
- Height: 5 ft 11 in (180 cm)
- Weight: 185 lb (84 kg; 13 st 3 lb)
- Position: Centre
- Shot: Left
- Played for: ECHL; Johnstown Chiefs; Charlotte Checkers; Toledo Storm; CHL; Wichita Thunder
- NHL draft: Undrafted
- Playing career: 1998–2005

Ted Dent (born November 5, 1969) is a Canadian former professional ice hockey player and the former general manager and head coach of the Flint Firebirds of the Ontario Hockey League. He was an American Hockey League head coach for the Rockford IceHogs.

Prior to turning professional, Dent attended St. Lawrence University where he played four seasons with the St. Lawrence Saints men's ice hockey team.

On April 25, 2017, the Blackhawks announced that they relieved Dent of his duties as the head coach of the IceHogs. During his six seasons with the team, he posted a record of 221-179-33-21.

On May 23, 2024, he was appointed head coach of German DEL team Augsburger Panther. Dent was sacked by the Augsburg side on November 27, 2024, following ten losses in a row.

On November 3, 2025, he was appointed head coach of Hungarian ICE Hockey League team Fehérvár AV19.
