= Kim Issel =

Canadian ice hockey player (born 1967)

- Born: September 25, 1967 (age 58) Regina, Saskatchewan, Canada
- Height: 6 ft 1 in (185 cm)
- Weight: 180 lb (82 kg; 12 st 12 lb)
- Position: Right wing
- Shot: Left
- Played for: Edmonton Oilers
- NHL draft: 21st overall, 1986; Edmonton Oilers
- Playing career: 1987–1998

Kim D. Issel (born September 25, 1967) is a former professional ice hockey right wing. Issel was born in Regina, Saskatchewan, and spent his junior career with the Prince Albert Raiders of the WHL. He was selected in the first round of the 1986 NHL entry draft, 21st overall, by the Edmonton Oilers. Issel played four games for the Oilers, and was briefly part of the Pittsburgh Penguins and Vancouver Canucks minor league systems, but spent the majority of his career in Europe. He officially announced his retirement on July 1, 1999, and has worked as a constable for the Prince Albert Police Department since then.

== Awards ==
- WHL East Second All-Star Team (1986)

== Career statistics ==
=== Regular season and playoffs ===
			Regular season					Playoffs
Season	Team	League	GP	G	A	Pts	PIM	GP	G	A	Pts	PIM
1983–84	Prince Albert Raiders	WHL	31	9	9	18	24	5	4	0	4	9
1984–85	Prince Albert Raiders	WHL	44	8	15	23	43	12	6	4	10	8
1985–86	Prince Albert Raiders	WHL	68	29	39	68	41	19	6	7	13	6
1986–87	Prince Albert Raiders	WHL	70	31	44	75	55	6	1	2	3	17
1987–88	Nova Scotia Oilers	AHL	68	20	25	45	31	2	1	0	1	10
1988–89	Edmonton Oilers	NHL	4	0	0	0	0	—	—	—	—	—
1988–89	Cape Breton Oilers	AHL	65	34	28	62	62	—	—	—	—	—
1989–90	Cape Breton Oilers	AHL	62	36	32	68	46	6	1	3	4	10
1990–91	Cape Breton Oilers	AHL	24	6	4	10	28	—	—	—	—	—
1990–91	Kansas City Blades	IHL	13	7	2	9	2	—	—	—	—	—
1991–92	EC VSV	AUT	45	42	49	91	72	—	—	—	—	—
1992–93	EC VSV	AUT	54	39	48	87	—	—	—	—	—	—
1993–94	EC VSV	AUT	33	23	27	50	53	—	—	—	—	—
1994–95	EK Zell am See	AUT	32	34	25	59	86	—	—	—	—	—
1994–95	HC Bolzano	ITA	5	0	2	2	4	—	—	—	—	—
1995–96	Durham Wasps	GBR	27	31	27	58	63	5	4	4	8	8
1996–97	VEU Feldkirch	AL	—	—	—	—	—	—	—	—	—	—
1996–97	HK Olimpija	SLO	52	25	27	52	—	—	—	—	—	—
1997–98	SERC Wild Wings	DEL	6	1	0	1	4	—	—	—	—	—
1997–98	ERC Ingolstadt	GER-2	9	4	6	10	8	—	—	—	—	—
1997–98	HK Olimpija	SLO	10	10	9	19	2	—	—	—	—	—
AHL totals			219	96	89	185	167	8	2	3	5	20
NHL totals			4	0	0	0	0	—	—	—	—	—

Preceded by Scott Metcalfe	Edmonton Oilers first-round draft pick 1986	Succeeded by Peter Soberlak
