= Jason Soules =

Canadian ice hockey player

- Born: March 14, 1971 (age 55) Hamilton, Ontario, Canada
- Height: 6 ft 3 in (191 cm)
- Weight: 205 lb (93 kg; 14 st 9 lb)
- Position: Defence
- Shot: Left
- Played for: Cape Breton Oilers (AHL)
- NHL draft: 15th overall, 1989; Edmonton Oilers
- Playing career: 1991–1992

Jason Soules (born March 14, 1971) is a Canadian former professional ice hockey defenceman. He was drafted in the first round, 15th overall, by the Edmonton Oilers in the 1989 NHL entry draft. He never played in the National Hockey League, however. He currently runs a hockey training establishment in Hamilton, Ontario.

== Career statistics ==
			Regular season					Playoffs
Season	Team	League	GP	G	A	Pts	PIM	GP	G	A	Pts	PIM
1987–88	Hamilton Kilty B's	GHL	27	3	10	13	99	—	—	—	—	—
1987–88	Hamilton Steelhawks	OHL	19	1	1	2	56	4	0	0	0	13
1988–89	Niagara Falls Thunder	OHL	57	3	8	11	187	4	0	0	0	10
1989–90	Niagara Falls Thunder	OHL	9	2	8	10	20	—	—	—	—	—
1989–90	Dukes of Hamilton	OHL	18	0	2	2	42	—	—	—	—	—
1990–91	Dukes of Hamilton	OHL	25	3	16	19	50	—	—	—	—	—
1990–91	Belleville Bulls	OHL	37	5	26	31	94	6	1	2	3	4
1990–91	Cape Breton Oilers	AHL	1	0	0	0	0	—	—	—	—	—
1991–92	Cape Breton Oilers	AHL	51	0	9	9	44	—	—	—	—	—
OHL totals			165	14	61	75	449	14	1	2	3	27
AHL totals			52	0	9	9	44	—	—	—	—	—

Preceded by François Leroux	Edmonton Oilers first-round draft pick 1989	Succeeded by Scott Allison
