= Ryan Oulahen =

Canadian ice hockey player and coach

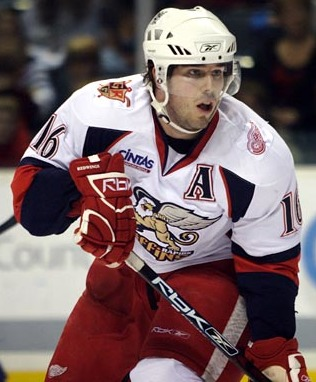
- Oulahen with the Grand Rapids Griffins in 2007
- Born: March 26, 1985 (age 41) Newmarket, Ontario, Canada
- Height: 6 ft 0 in (183 cm)
- Weight: 185 lb (84 kg; 13 st 3 lb)
- Position: Forward
- Shot: Left
- Played for: Grand Rapids Griffins
- NHL draft: 164th overall, 2003; Detroit Red Wings
- Playing career: 2005–2009

Ryan Oulahen (born March 26, 1985) is a Canadian former professional ice hockey player and current head coach for the North Bay Battalion of the Ontario Hockey League (OHL). Oulahen was drafted in the fifth round of the 2003 NHL entry draft by the Detroit Red Wings. He previously served as the head coach of the Flint Firebirds of the OHL.

== Playing career ==
=== Junior ===
Oulahen was drafted in the fourth-round of the 2001 OHL Priority Selection by the Brampton Battalion. On September 20, 2004, Oulahen was named captain of the Battalion. Oulahen spent three seasons with the Battalion, where he recorded 65 goals and 71 assists in 182 games. His 136 points ranked 16th on the club's career list, while he was ninth in goals, third all-time in power-play goals with 16 and tied for fourth with six shorthanded goals.

=== Professional ===
On July 29, 2005, the Detroit Red Wings signed Oulahen to a three-year entry-level contract. During the 2007–08 season, Oulahen served as a co-captain of the Grand Rapids Griffins, where he recorded 14 goals and 16 assists in 75 games. On July 23, 2008, the Red Wings signed Oulahen to a one-year contract extension.

On March 27, 2009, Oulahen suffered a dislocated hip after getting his skate caught in a rut in the ice during his second shift of the second period, ending his season. He finished the 2008–09 season with 19 goals and 12 assists in 73 games. On July 22, 2009, the Red Wings signed Oulahen to a one-year contract extension. He attempted a comeback after two surgeries and months of rehabilitation, however, lingering soreness prevented him from ever taking the ice, thus ending his playing career. He finished his career with 53 goals and 54 assists in 302 career games for the Griffins.

== Coaching career ==
In January 2011, Oulahen was named an assistant coach for the Brampton Battalion of the Ontario Hockey League (OHL), a position he held for five seasons. In May 2016, Oulahen was named the head coach of the Flint Firebirds of the OHL. On October 12, 2018, Oulahen announced he was stepping down as head coach of the Firebirds due to personal and family reasons. On December 10, 2019, Oulahen was named the interim head coach of the North Bay Battalion of the OHL. He was named the permanent head coach on March 24, 2020, after the season was cut short due to the COVID-19 pandemic.

=== Team Canada ===
Oulahen served as an assistant coach for Canada Red at the 2014 World U-17 Hockey Challenge, where the team finished in sixth place at the tournament. In May 2015, Oulahen was named an assistant coach for Canada Black at the 2015 World U-17 Hockey Challenge, where the team finished in eighth place at the tournament. In May 2017, Oulahen was named head coach of Canada White at the 2017 World U-17 Hockey Challenge, where the team posted a 2–3–1 record and finished in fourth place in the tournament. In June 2018, Oulahen was named an assistant coach for Canada men's national under-18 ice hockey team at the 2018 Hlinka Gretzky Cup, and won a gold medal.

== Career statistics ==
			Regular season					Playoffs
Season	Team	League	GP	G	A	Pts	PIM	GP	G	A	Pts	PIM
2000–01	Wexford Raiders	OJPHL	66	38	58	96	18	—	—	—	—	—
2001–02	Newmarket Hurricanes	OJPHL	49	18	17	35	4	—	—	—	—	—
2002–03	Brampton Battalion	OHL	61	21	22	43	6	11	2	1	3	2
2003–04	Brampton Battalion	OHL	57	17	18	35	26	12	3	7	10	6
2004–05	Brampton Battalion	OHL	64	27	31	58	22	5	1	4	5	4
2005–06	Grand Rapids Griffins	AHL	75	9	10	19	20	16	0	0	0	2
2006–07	Grand Rapids Griffins	AHL	79	11	16	27	42	7	0	2	2	4
2007–08	Grand Rapids Griffins	AHL	75	14	16	30	47	—	—	—	—	—
2008–09	Grand Rapids Griffins	AHL	73	19	12	31	31	—	—	—	—	—
AHL totals			302	53	54	107	140	23	0	2	2	6

== Coaching record ==
=== Ontario Hockey League ===
Team	Year	Regular season						Postseason
Team	Year	G	W	L	OTL	Pts	Finish	Result
FLI	2016–17	68	32	28	8	72	3rd in West	Lost in conference quarter-finals (SSM)
FLI	2017–18	68	20	43	5	45	5th in West	Did not qualify
FLI Totals		136	52	71	13	117		
NB	2019–20	34	12	18	4	28	5th in Central	Did not qualify
NB	2021–22	68	43	18	7	93	1st in Central	Lost in East Final (HAM)
NB	2022–23	68	48	17	3	99	1st in Central	Lost in East Final (PET)
NB	2023–24	68	39	20	9	87	1st in Central	Lost in East Final (OSH)
NB	2024–25	68	28	34	6	62	5th in Central	Lost in first round (BFD)
NB Totals		306	170	107	29	369		
OHL totals	2016–2025	442	222	178	42	486		
