= Flint Firebirds =

Ontario Hockey League team in Flint, Michigan

- City: Flint, Michigan
- League: Ontario Hockey League
- Conference: Western
- Division: West
- Founded: 1990
- Operated: 2015–present
- Home arena: Dort Financial Center
- Colors: Navy Blue, White, Orange and Silver
- Owner: Rolf Nilsen
- General manager: Dave McParlan
- Head coach: Paul Flache
- Affiliates: Leamington Flyers (OJHL)
- Website: www.flintfirebirds.com

Franchise history
- 1990–1992: Detroit Compuware Ambassadors
- 1992–1995: Detroit Junior Red Wings
- 1995–1997: Detroit Whalers
- 1997–2015: Plymouth Whalers
- 2015–present: Flint Firebirds

Current uniform

The Flint Firebirds are a major junior ice hockey team based in Flint, Michigan. The team plays home games at the Dort Financial Center, and operates as a member of the Ontario Hockey League (OHL). The team began play for the 2015–16 season. In September 2022, the Firebirds announced the Leamington Flyers as an affiliate.

== History ==
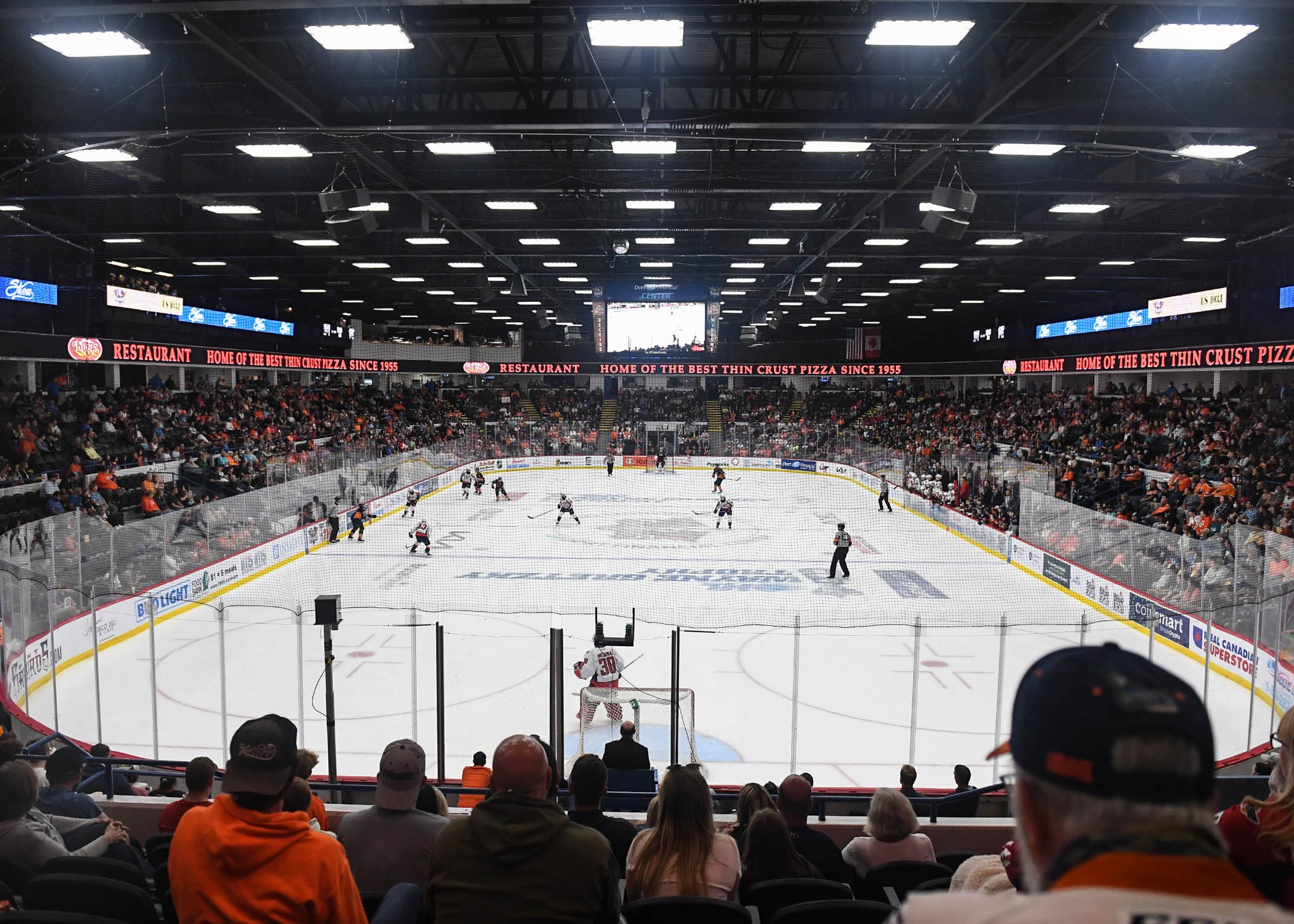

The Firebirds trace their roots back to the 1990–91 season, when the Detroit Compuware Ambassadors were added as an expansion team in the OHL. Since then, the franchise has been the Detroit Junior Red Wings, the Detroit Whalers and the Plymouth Whalers. On January 14, 2015, it was announced that longtime Whalers owner Peter Karmanos had sold the team to IMS USA, Inc., with the intention to move the franchise to Flint and the Perani Arena. The purchase and relocation was approved by the OHL on February 2, 2015.

Although there was sentiment towards resurrecting the Flint Generals nickname that had been used by two past teams in the city, the OHL quickly nixed that idea because of the Oshawa Generals using that name. Likewise, a popular suggestion was the Flint Tropics, after the fictional American Basketball Association team of that name in the 2008 movie Semi-Pro. However, after various others voiced their displeasure at their team possibly being named after a comedy movie's protagonist team, and the chance of the novelty wearing off after a while, the name did not make the list of finalist choices.

The nine finalist nicknames were Firebirds, Force, Fury, Nationals, Pride, Spark Plugs, Sparks, United, and Vikings.

=== Coaching controversies ===
The Firebirds garnered international attention in November 2015 when, following an overtime victory over the Oshawa Generals, owner Rolf Nilsen fired the team's entire coaching staff for failing to adequately increase the playing time of his son, Håkon Nilsen, a Firebirds' defenseman described by one NHL player agent as "a borderline OHL player". Prior to the game against Oshawa, the entire team with the exception of Hakon Nilsen met with head coach John Gruden and his staff and were informed that the owner had insisted that his son receive more playing time, and indeed Nilsen ultimately played 17 minutes, including power-play time, in the subsequent game. However, head coach John Gruden has denied that this was the reason for his dismissal. In response to the firings, the entire team, including Håkon Nilsen, stormed into the team's front office, threw their jerseys on the floor, and quit the team in a show of solidarity with the coaching staff.

The player revolt proved to be successful, as less than 24 hours later the coaching staff was not only rehired, but given three-year contract extensions. Following a meeting with OHL commissioner David Branch, Firebirds' owner Rolf Nilsen stated publicly that he had made an "irresponsible mistake" and apologized to the players.

On February 17, 2016, Rolf Nilsen again fired head coach John Gruden and assistant coach Dave Karpa. The next day, OHL Commissioner David Branch suspended Nilsen, as well as his appointees on the management and coaching staff, from hockey operations until further notice. The league also ordered counseling be provided to players, at Nilsen's cost. Nilsen and his staff were then ordered to cooperate with a league investigation and comply with its findings. On April 6, 2016, the OHL suspended Nilsen for five years, with no requests for reinstatement to be entertained for three years. He was also fined $250,000. The league also stripped the Firebirds of their 2016 first-round draft pick. Had Nilsen attempted to get involved in hockey operations while suspended, the OHL could have forced him to sell the Firebirds. The OHL placed the Firebirds under league stewardship and appointed Joe Birch as director of operations. After the five-year suspension passed, the OHL reinstated Rolf Nilsen in April 2021.

=== Recent history ===
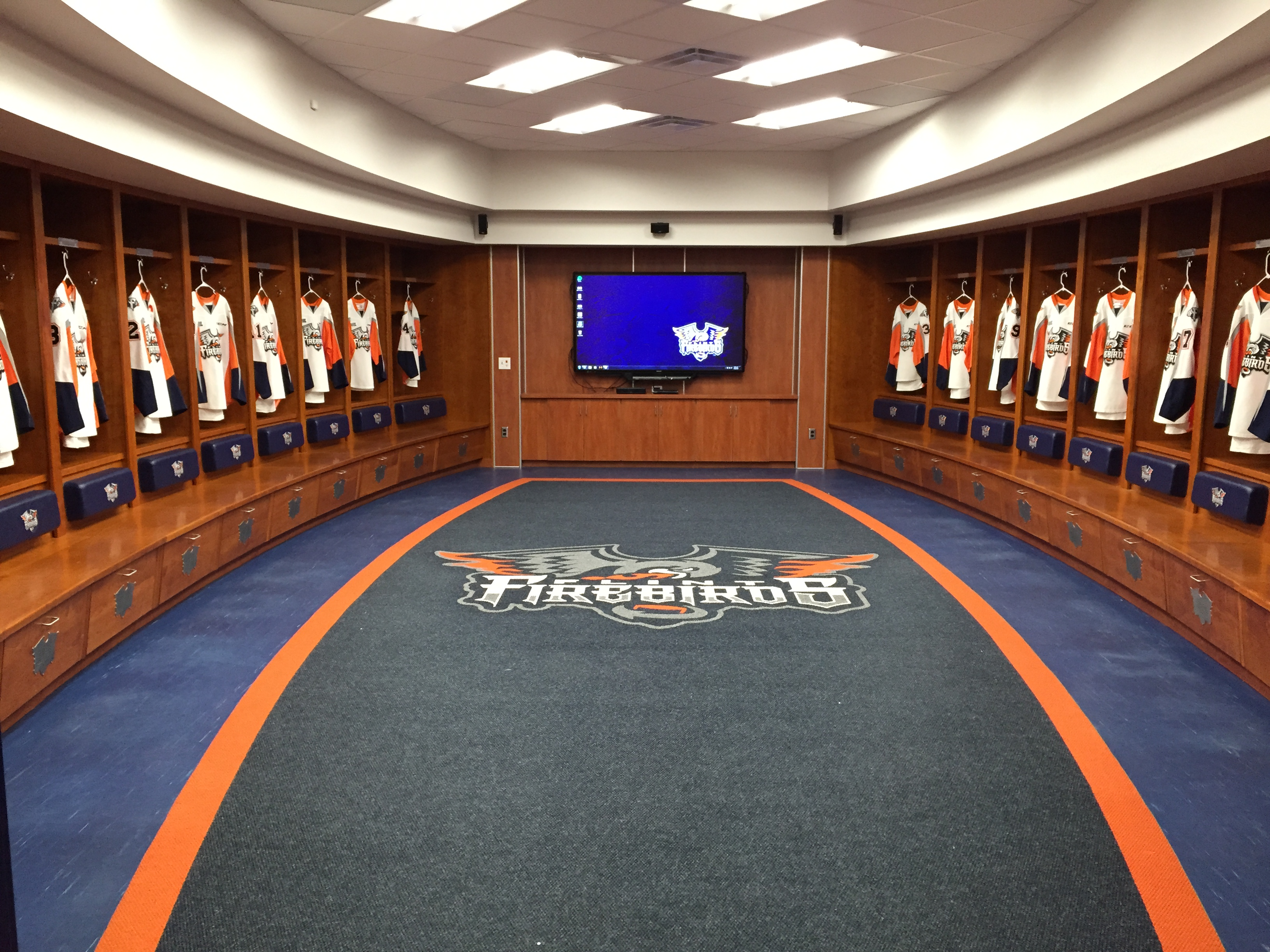
The Flint Firebirds Locker Room

In May 2016, the OHL named George Burnett, former head coach and general manager of the Belleville Bulls, as the new general manager. The OHL then appointed Ryan Oulahen as head coach and Eric Wellwood as an assistant. On October 12, 2018, Ryan Oulahen stepped down as head coach. On October 18, former associate coach Eric Wellwood was named head coach.

On February 21, 2020, the Firebirds won their 15th consecutive game, setting a new franchise record. It was their 37th win of the season, another club record.

On March 10, 2022, the OHL expelled team president Terry Christensen after an investigation found that he violated OHL policy for harassment, abuse, and diversity.

== Head coaches ==
List of coaches with multiple seasons in parentheses.

- 2015–16 – John Gruden
- 2016–17 – Ryan Oulahen
- 2017–18 – Ryan Oulahen, Eric Wellwood
- 2018–21 – Eric Wellwood (3)
- 2021–23 – Ted Dent (2)
- 2023–present – Paul Flache

== General managers ==
List of general managers with multiple seasons in parentheses.

- 2015–16 – Terry Christensen
- 2016–17 – George Burnett
- 2017–21 – Barclay Branch (4)
- 2021–22 – Terry Christensen
- 2022–23 – Ted Dent
- 2023–present – Dave McParlan

== Players ==
=== Team captains ===
List of team captains:

- 2015–17: Alex Peters
- 2017–18: Ryan Moore / Jalen Smereck
- 2018–2020: Ty Dellandrea
- 2021–23: Brennan Othmann
- 2023–24: Zacharie Giroux / Coulson Pitre
- 2024–25: Connor Clattenburg

=== NHL alumni ===
List of Firebirds alumni who played in the National Hockey League (NHL):

- Will Bitten
- Nick Caamano
- Connor Clattenburg
- Ty Dellandrea
- Vladislav Kolyachonok
- Alex Nedeljkovic
- Brennan Othmann
- Vili Saarijärvi
- Kole Sherwood
- Tyler Tucker

== Season-by-season results ==
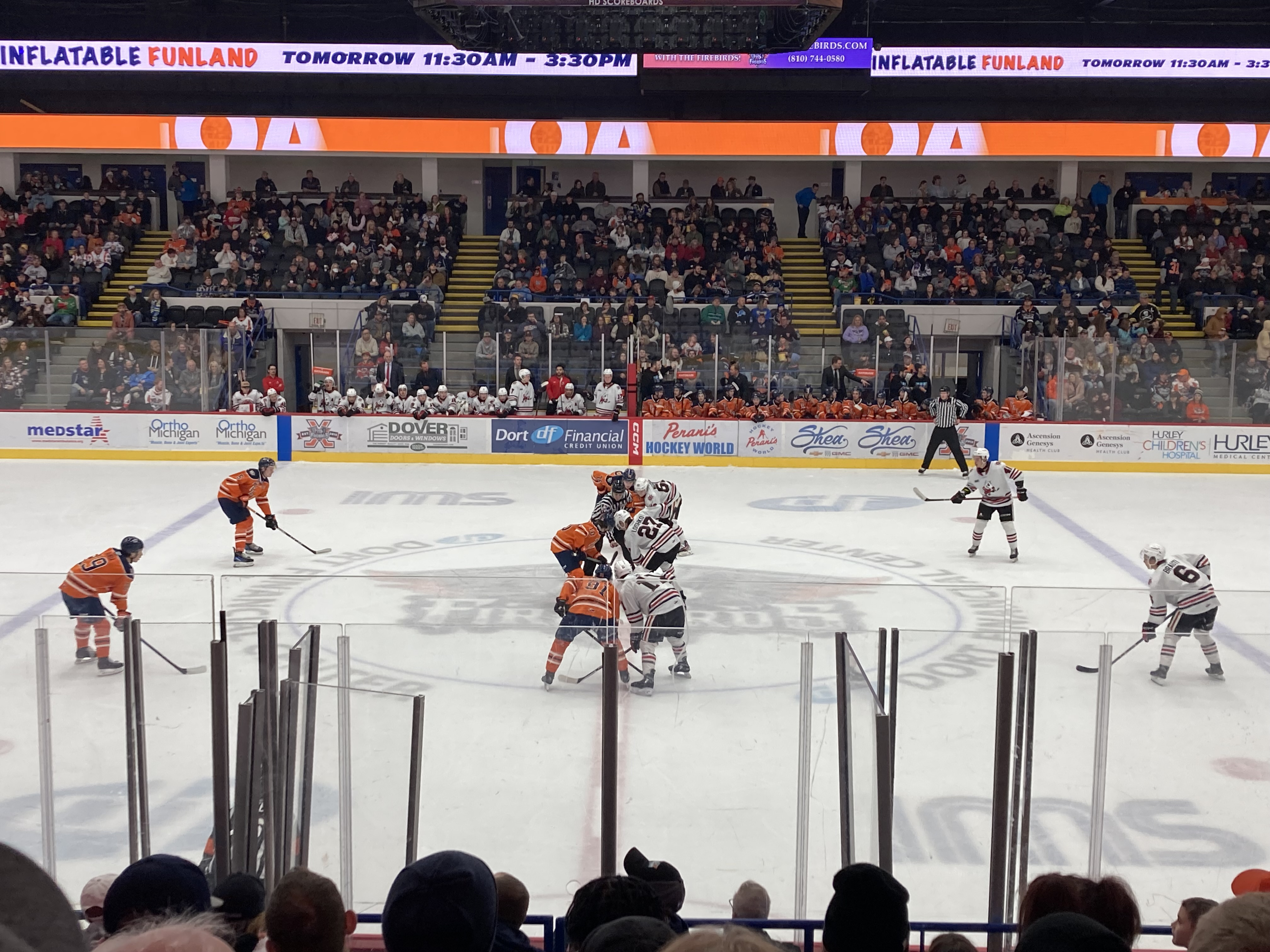
The Firebirds hosting Niagara in 2024

Regular season and playoffs results:

Legend: GP = Games played, W = Wins, L = Losses, T = Ties, OTL = Overtime losses, SL = Shoot-out losses, Pts = Points, GF = Goals for, GA = Goals against

Memorial Cup champions	OHL champions	OHL finalists

Season	Regular season										Playoffs
Season	GP	W	L	OTL	SOL	Pts	Pct	GF	GA	Finish	Playoffs
2015–16	68	20	42	4	2	46	0.338	184	279	5th West	Did not qualify
2016–17	68	32	28	3	5	72	0.529	229	242	3rd West	Lost conference quarterfinal (Sault Ste. Marie Greyhounds) 4–1
2017–18	68	20	43	3	2	45	0.331	194	316	5th West	Did not qualify
2018–19	68	16	46	6	0	38	0.279	212	350	5th West	Did not qualify
2019–20	63	40	21	1	1	82	0.651	274	243	2nd West	Playoffs cancelled due to the COVID-19 pandemic
2020–21	Season cancelled due to the COVID-19 pandemic										
2021–22	68	42	21	1	4	89	0.654	286	238	2nd West	Won conference quarterfinal (Owen Sound Attack) 4–3; Won conference semifinal (Sault Ste. Marie Greyhounds) 4–1; Lost conference final (Windsor Spitfires) 4–3
2022–23	68	35	28	4	1	75	0.551	291	278	4th West	Lost conference quarterfinal (Saginaw Spirit) 4–3
2023–24	68	30	33	4	1	65	0.478	232	274	3rd West	Lost conference quarterfinal (London Knights) 4–0
2024–25	68	29	34	2	3	63	0.463	229	249	3rd West	Lost conference quarterfinal (Kitchener Rangers) 4–1
2025–26	68	44	17	4	3	95	0.699	261	199	2nd West	Won conference quarterfinal (Owen Sound Attack) 4–0; Lost conference semifinal (Windsor Spitfires) 4–0

== Radio and television ==
Brian Gardner is the play-by-play voice of the Firebirds. On radio, games are broadcast live on WQUS (103.1 FM). Telecasts are streamed online via CHL TV in the U.S. and Canada and aired on Rogers Cable and Cogeco via the OHL Action Pak in Canada.
