= Connor Clattenburg =

Canadian ice hockey player (born 2005)

- Born: May 2, 2005 (age 21) Ottawa, Ontario, Canada
- Height: 6 ft 2 in (188 cm)
- Weight: 219 lb (99 kg; 15 st 9 lb)
- Position: Forward
- Shoots: Left
- NHL team (P) Cur. team: Edmonton Oilers; Bakersfield Condors (AHL)
- NHL draft: 160th overall, 2024; Edmonton Oilers
- Playing career: 2025–present

Connor Bradley Clattenburg (born May 2, 2005) is a Canadian professional ice hockey player who is a forward for the Bakersfield Condors in the American Hockey League (AHL) as a prospect to the Edmonton Oilers of the National Hockey League (NHL). He was drafted 160th overall in the 2024 NHL entry draft.

== Early life ==
Clattenburg was born in Ottawa, Ontario, the son of Jeff and Katie Clattenburg, and grew up in Arnprior, Ontario.

== Career ==
He played at the major junior level for the Sault Ste. Marie Greyhounds and Flint Firebirds of the Ontario Hockey League (OHL) from 2022 to 2025. He was drafted by the Oilers in the fifth round of the 2024 NHL entry draft with the 160th overall pick. He signed an entry-level contract with the Oilers on December 23, 2024.

Turning professional for the 2025–26 NHL season, Clattenburg was recalled to the NHL on November 21, 2025. He debuted the next day against the Florida Panthers, recording two shots on goal, one hit, and a minor penalty for roughing in a 6–3 win. He scored his first NHL goal in the following game against the Dallas Stars in an 8–3 losing effort. In his next game, a 4–0 win over the Seattle Kraken, Clattenburg got into his first NHL fight against Frédérick Gaudreau.

== Career statistics ==
			Regular season					Playoffs
Season	Team	League	GP	G	A	Pts	PIM	GP	G	A	Pts	PIM
2021–22	Renfrew Wolves	CCHL	3	0	2	2	0	1	0	0	0	0
2021–22	Valley Timberwolves	EOJHL	6	0	5	5	10	—	—	—	—	—
2022–23	Sault Ste. Marie Greyhounds	OHL	56	2	8	10	115	—	—	—	—	—
2023–24	Sault Ste. Marie Greyhounds	OHL	30	4	8	12	51	—	—	—	—	—
2023–24	Flint Firebirds	OHL	30	9	8	17	28	—	—	—	—	—
2024–25	Flint Firebirds	OHL	46	16	19	35	108	5	1	1	2	11
2024–25	Bakersfield Condors	AHL	1	0	0	0	0	—	—	—	—	—
2025–26	Bakersfield Condors	AHL	32	2	2	4	131	—	—	—	—	—
2025–26	Edmonton Oilers	NHL	5	1	0	1	13	—	—	—	—	—
NHL totals			5	1	0	1	13	—	—	—	—	—
