= Ryan Smyth =

Canadian ice hockey player (born 1976)

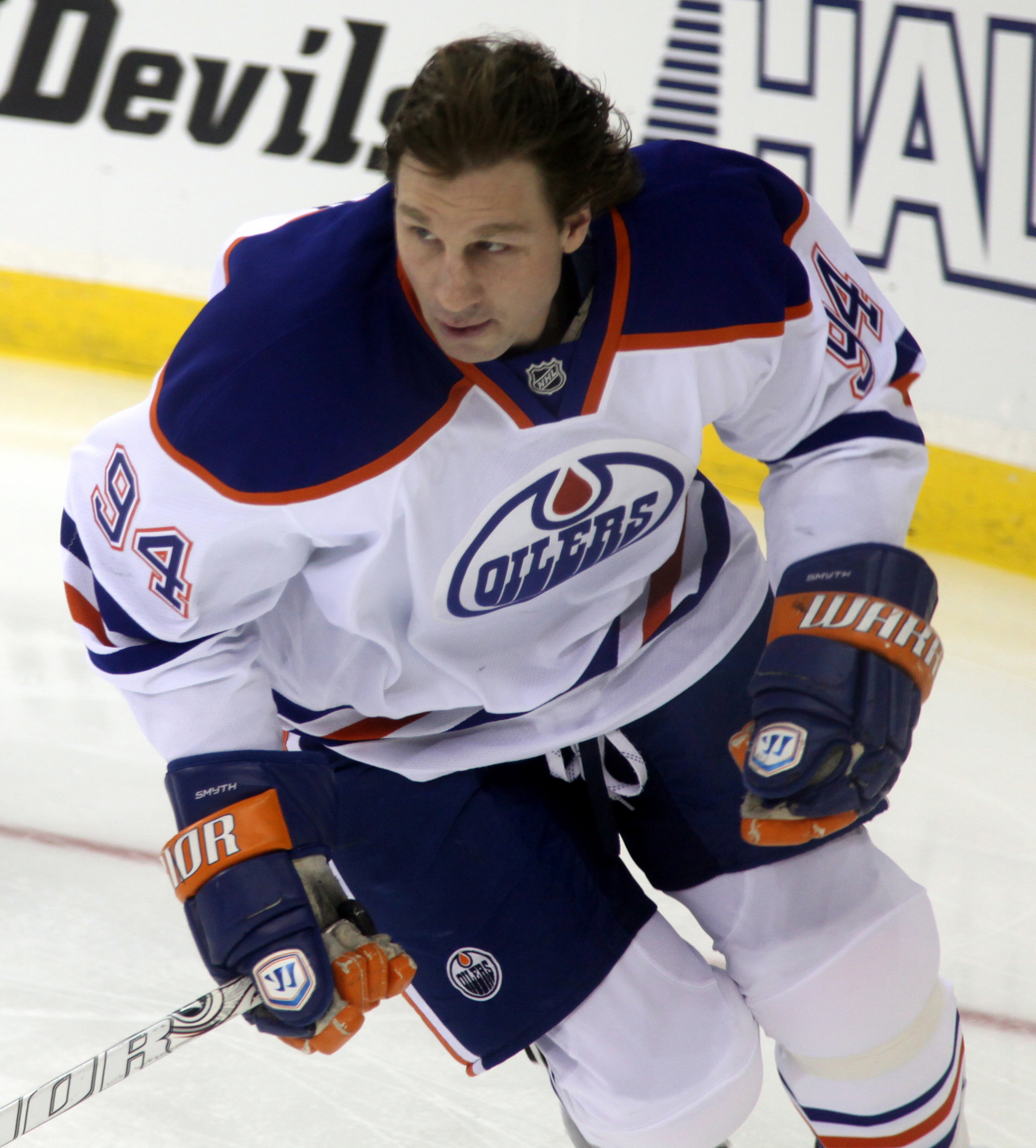
- Smyth with the Edmonton Oilers in 2014
- Born: February 21, 1976 (age 50) Banff, Alberta, Canada
- Height: 6 ft 2 in (188 cm)
- Weight: 191 lb (87 kg; 13 st 9 lb)
- Position: Left wing
- Shot: Left
- Played for: Edmonton Oilers; New York Islanders; Colorado Avalanche; Los Angeles Kings
- National team: Canada
- NHL draft: 6th overall, 1994; Edmonton Oilers
- Playing career: 1994–2014

Ryan Alexander Borden Smyth (born February 21, 1976) is a Canadian former professional ice hockey player who played most of his career for the Edmonton Oilers of the National Hockey League (NHL). He was especially known for playing in the style of a power forward. He has been one of the owners of the BCHL Spruce Grove Saints since 2017.

During his junior career, Ryan Smyth spent three years with the Moose Jaw Warriors of the Western Hockey League (WHL), scoring 105 points during the 1993–94 season. Smyth was then drafted 6th overall in the 1994 NHL entry draft by the Edmonton Oilers. That year he played only three games for the Oilers, as he stayed for the majority of the year in Moose Jaw. He spent 12 seasons with Edmonton before being traded to the New York Islanders in 2007 due to failed contract negotiations. Becoming an unrestricted free agent in the subsequent off-season, he signed a five-year contract with the Colorado Avalanche. After two seasons with the team, he was traded to the Los Angeles Kings in July 2009. On June 26, 2011, he was re-acquired by the Edmonton Oilers for Colin Fraser and a seventh-round pick in 2012. He announced his retirement on April 11, 2014, after 19 seasons in the NHL.

Smyth has represented Canada in international competition on numerous occasions. He has won gold medals at the 1995 World Junior Championship, 2002 Winter Olympics, 2003 and 2004 World Championships, and 2004 World Cup. Having served as captain of Canada's World Championship team for a team record six years (2001–05 and 2010), he has earned the nickname "Captain Canada." Smyth is also Canada's all-time leader in games played at the tournament. He played a record 90 games for Hockey Canada while becoming the only player in hockey history to win gold in all of Olympics, World Cup, World Championships, World Juniors, and Spengler Cup. He was inducted into the IIHF Hall of Fame in 2024.

== Playing career ==
=== Moose Jaw Warriors (1992–1995) ===
Smyth played in the junior ranks with the Moose Jaw Warriors of the Western Hockey League (WHL). Beginning in 1991–92, he debuted in two games with the team, recording no points. The following season, he notched 19 goals and 33 points over 64 games as a rookie. In 1993–94, he improved to 50 goals and 105 points over 72 games, becoming a top NHL prospect. During the subsequent off-season, he was selected sixth overall by the Edmonton Oilers in the 1994 NHL entry draft. Some Oilers' scouts wanted to draft Ethan Moreau (future Oilers captain), in part because he was a linemate of the Oilers' fourth overall selection, Jason Bonsignore (who only ended up playing 79 NHL games, 21 of those with the Oilers). Sather, however, went with the opinion of scout Lorne Davis and selected Smyth instead.

Following his selection, Smyth returned to the WHL for one more season with Moose Jaw, recording 41 goals and 86 points over 50 games in 1994–95. He helped the Warriors qualify for the playoffs for the first time in his tenure with the team and added 15 points over 10 post-season games. Smyth had his number 28 retired by the Moose Jaw Warriors in 2015.

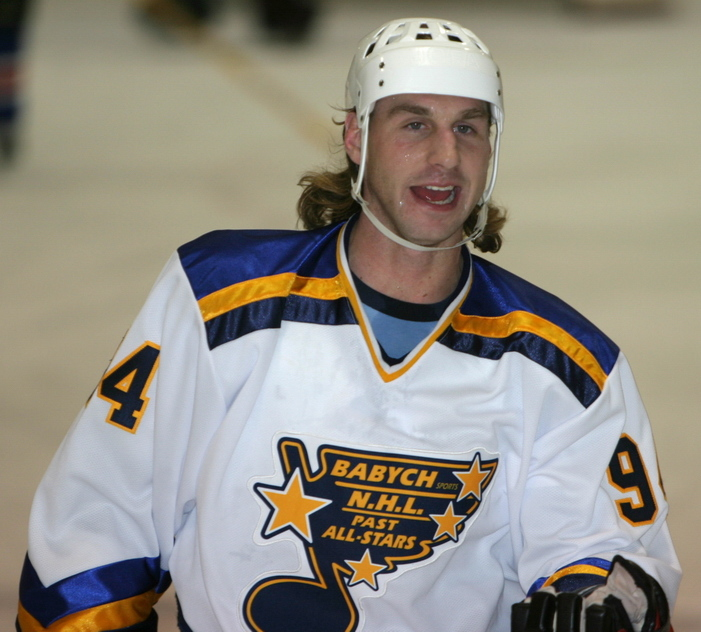
Smyth participating in Wayne Babych's charity All-Star Game in 2005

=== Edmonton Oilers (1994–2007) ===
During his final junior season, Smyth was briefly called up to the NHL by the Oilers. He made his debut on January 22, 1995, in an away game against the Los Angeles Kings. Playing in three games total, he did not record any points. The following season, he tallied his first goal, on November 24, 1995, against Trevor Kidd of the Calgary Flames while on the power play. He went on to record two goals and 11 points over 48 games as a rookie, while also spending time in the American Hockey League (AHL) with the Oilers' minor league affiliate, the Cape Breton Oilers. He recorded 11 points over 9 AHL games in 1995–96.

Smyth spent the entire 1996–97 season with the Oilers and improved to 39 goals (a career-high) and 61 points over 82 games. At the beginning of the season, on October 8, 1996, he recorded his first of five career hat tricks. With 20 power-play goals, he tied Wayne Gretzky's team record, set in 1983–84. In the 1997 playoffs, he added 10 points in 12 games. Despite a strong second NHL season, he struggled in the next two campaigns with 33- and 31-point efforts. In 1999–2000, he returned to form with a 28-goal, 54-point year. The following season, he recorded a career-high 39 assists and 70 points, ranking second in team scoring to team captain and first-line centre Doug Weight.

As Weight was traded in the off-season to the St. Louis Blues, Smyth took on a larger role as offensive leader on the team. For the remainder of his tenure with the Oilers, he remained in the 50–60 point range. During the 2001–02 season, he ranked third in team scoring with 15 goals and 50 points to Mike Comrie and Anson Carter's 60 points, despite playing in 21 games less than them due to injury. The following season, he appeared in 66 games and increased his offensive totals to 27 goals and 61 points. It marked the first time in his career that he led the Oilers in scoring, edging Todd Marchant by one point. During the off-season, Smyth filed for salary arbitration after initially failing to come to terms on a new contract with the Oilers. On August 14, 2003, both sides avoided arbitration by signing a two-year contract.

Playing a full 82 games in 2003–04, Smyth tallied 59 points (23 goals and 36 assists) to lead the Oilers in scoring for the second straight year. During that season, Smyth spent several games as the Oilers' captain while active captain Jason Smith was out with an ankle injury. Due to the 2004–05 NHL lockout, Smyth spent the season inactive. As NHL play resumed the next year, he approached career-high totals with 36 goals and 66 points. With several young players emerging on the team's roster, Smyth ranked fourth in team scoring, behind Aleš Hemský, Shawn Horcoff and Jarret Stoll. His 19 power-play goals came within one of the team records he previously set in his second year with the Oilers. Although Edmonton entered the 2006 playoffs as the eighth and final seed in the Western Conference, Smyth helped the team on a run to the Stanley Cup Final with 16 points in 24 post-season games. During the second round against the San Jose Sharks, he was hit in the mouth with a puck as a result of a clearing attempt from defensive teammate Chris Pronger. After losing three teeth and needing stitches, Smyth returned in the third period and went on to set up Shawn Horcoff's game-winning goal in triple-overtime. The win reduced San Jose's series lead to 2–1, helping the Oilers eventually advance to the Conference Finals in six games. After eliminating the Mighty Ducks of Anaheim in the third round, the Oilers were ultimately defeated in seven games by the Carolina Hurricanes in the Final. Had the Oilers won the Stanley Cup, Smyth would have joined the Triple Gold Club along with Chris Pronger and Jaroslav Špaček.

Early the following season, during a game against the San Jose Sharks on October 12, 2006, Smyth broke an Oilers record for the fastest three goals scored in one contest. With the Sharks leading 4–2 in the third period, he recorded a hat trick with two goals on the power play and one more on a 5-on-5 in two minutes and one second, breaking the previous team record set by Wayne Gretzky on February 18, 1981, by 17 seconds. It was Smyth's fifth career hat trick as Edmonton went on to win the game 6–4. In the final year of his contract, Smyth was enjoying one of the most productive seasons of his career. As a result, he was chosen for his first NHL All-Star Game in 2007. With the Oilers unable to extend his contract before the NHL trade deadline, Smyth was dealt away to the New York Islanders in exchange for prospects Robert Nilsson and Ryan O'Marra, as well as a first-round selection in the 2007 NHL entry draft. It was reported that Smyth was asking for a long-term deal worth at least $5 million a season to remain in Edmonton. The move was made to ensure the team did not lose Smyth for nothing, as he became an unrestricted free agent in the off-season. At the time of the trade, he was scoring at a point-per-game pace with 31 goals and 22 assists over 53 games.

Despite playing the remainder of the season with the Islanders, he finished tied for the Oilers lead in point-scoring that year; Petr Sýkora had 53 points in a full 82 games. Before boarding a flight for New York with his family, Smyth tearfully addressed the media at Edmonton International Airport, thanking the Oilers for his time with the organization and expressing regret for having to be traded. He stated he was going to win the Stanley Cup with the Islanders and bring it to Edmonton. Leaving the Oilers after 12 seasons, he ranked seventh on the team's all-time list for points scored with 549 over 770 games.

=== New York Islanders (2007) ===
Smyth debuted with the Islanders on March 1, 2007, during a game against the St. Louis Blues. He notched his first point as an Islander with an assist on Mike Sillinger's first-period power play goal; New York lost the game 3–2 in overtime. Two days later, he recorded his first goal as an Islander in a 6–2 win against the Washington Capitals. Playing in 18 games with the Islanders to close out the 2006–07 season, Smyth posted 15 points (5 goals and 10 assists). Combined with his stats from Edmonton, he finished with 36 goals and 68 points, the second-highest totals of his career. Smyth's efforts helped the Islanders beat out the Toronto Maple Leafs and Montreal Canadiens for the eighth and final seed in the Eastern Conference for the 2007 playoffs. Playing the first-seeded Buffalo Sabres in the opening round, the Islanders were defeated in five games. Smyth recorded one goal and three assists during the series.

=== Colorado Avalanche (2007–2009) ===
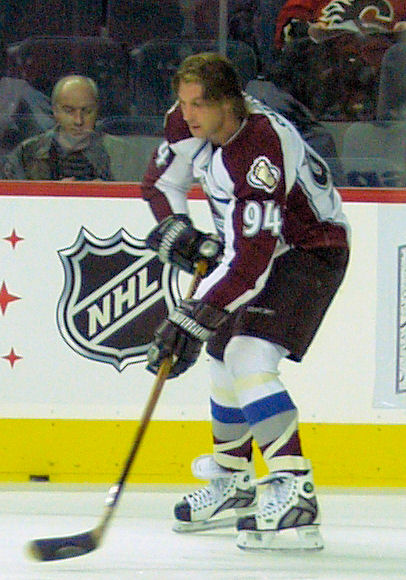
Smyth with the Avalanche

Becoming an unrestricted free agent on July 1, 2007, Smyth signed a five-year, $31.2 million contract with the Colorado Avalanche. After debuting with the Avalanche on October 3, 2007, in a 4–3 win against the Dallas Stars, he scored his first goal with his new team four days later. Beating goaltender Evgeni Nabokov short-handed during the third period, he helped Colorado to a 6–2 win. Playing on the first line, Smyth found early chemistry with centre and team captain Joe Sakic. The duo was interrupted, however, as both players were sidelined with injuries for large portions of the season – Smyth's included neck, ankle and head ailments. Limited to 55 games, he recorded 14 goals and 37 points, the lowest totals of his career since the 1998–99 season. During the 2008 playoffs, Smyth helped Colorado advance past the Minnesota Wild in the first round. They were, however, swept the following round by the Detroit Red Wings, who went on to win the Stanley Cup that year. Smyth missed the last two games of the playoffs with a foot injury, finishing with two goals and five points over eight games.

Smyth bounced back from an injury-filled first year with the Avalanche by remaining healthy for the majority of the 2008–09 season. During the campaign, Ryan Smyth and right winger Milan Hejduk scored their respective 300th career goals on January 18, 2009, against the Calgary Flames in a 6–2 victory at the Pepsi Center. He went on to record 26 goals and 33 assists for 59 points over 77 games, before fracturing his right hand on April 1, 2009, in a 3–0 home loss against the Phoenix Coyotes, ending his season five games early. He tied for the team lead in point-scoring with Hejduk, who played in five more games than Smyth. Dealing with long-term injuries to both Paul Stastny and captain Joe Sakic, the Avalanche struggled as a team and finished last in the Western Conference.

=== Los Angeles Kings (2009–2011) ===
With the Avalanche in the midst of a rebuilding process, Smyth was traded to the Los Angeles Kings on July 3, 2009, in exchange for Kyle Quincey, Tom Preissing and a fifth-round selection in the 2010 NHL entry draft. During his Kings debut on October 3, 2009, he assisted on the team's first goal of the season by Anže Kopitar. The Kings, however, lost the game 6–3 to the Phoenix Coyotes. His first goal with the Kings came five days later, scoring against Minnesota Wild goaltender Josh Harding in a 6–3 win. Playing regularly on a line with Jarret Stoll and Dustin Brown, he recorded 22 goals and 53 points over 67 games, ranking fourth in team scoring. Joining a team on a markedly different trajectory than Colorado, the Kings were an improving club. Smyth's efforts helped them qualify for the playoffs for the first time in eight years. Playing the third-seeded Vancouver Canucks in the first round, they were defeated in six games.

A month into the 2010–11 season, Smyth played his 1,000th career NHL game on November 6, 2010. His teammates acknowledged the accomplishment by wearing mullet wigs during their morning skate, alluding to Smyth's distinctive hairstyle. The Kings won the game 4–1 over the Nashville Predators, with Smyth scoring a goal in the second period. Playing in a full 82 games, Smyth finished the season with 23 goals and 47 points. The Kings qualified for the playoffs with the seventh seed and were eliminated in the first round by the San Jose Sharks.

During the off-season, it was reported that Smyth had informed Kings management he would prefer to play the last year of his contract with the Oilers.

=== Return to the Oilers (2011–2014) ===
On June 24, 2011, the day of the 2011 NHL entry draft, it was reported that the Edmonton Oilers and the Los Angeles Kings had come to an agreement that Smyth would go to Edmonton in return for Gilbert Brulé and a fourth-round pick in the 2011 NHL entry draft. Upon salary cap and injury concerns, the trade never went through due to the Kings' plan to buy out Brulé's contract; however, the NHL prohibits teams from buying out injured players. Smyth wanted to leave the Kings and return to the Oilers, as he wanted to end his career where he started it. On June 26, 2011, the Kings officially traded Smyth back to Edmonton for Colin Fraser and a seventh-round draft pick in the 2012 NHL entry draft.

In 2011–12, his first season back with the Oilers, Smyth was the only Oiler to play all 82 games and was fifth in scoring with 46 points. On February 27, 2012, he recorded his 800th career point, an assist, against the Winnipeg Jets.

On January 26, 2014, Smyth tied Wayne Gretzky for number two on the Oilers all-time power-play goal-scoring list in a 5–1 win over the Nashville Predators. On March 6, he overtook Gretzky and tied Glenn Anderson for the most power-play goals in franchise history with 126.

With the Oilers out of playoff position towards the conclusion of the 2013–14 season, on April 11, Smyth announced his retirement after 19 seasons from the National Hockey League aged 38. He served as the team captain in his final game and also received the game's first star honours. Rexall Place had its ring that traditionally read "WELCOME TO OIL COUNTRY" changed to read "THANK YOU SMYTTY".

== International play ==
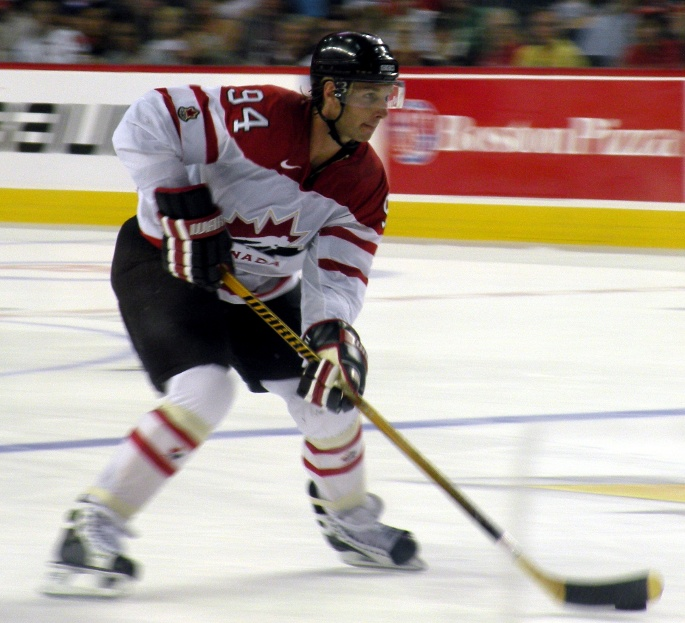
- Smyth at pre-Olympic camp in 2009

Medal record

Ice hockey

Representing Canada

World Championships
Gold medal – first place	2003 Finland	
Gold medal – first place	2004 Czech Republic	
Silver medal – second place	2005 Austria	

World Cup
Gold medal – first place	2004 Canada	

Olympic Games
Gold medal – first place	2002 Salt Lake City	

World Junior Championships
Gold medal – first place	1995 Canada	

Spengler Cup
Gold medal – first place	2012 Canada	

Smyth debuted with Hockey Canada with the country's under-20 team at the 1995 World Junior Championships in Red Deer, Alberta. He recorded two goals and seven points as Canada went undefeated in seven games to win the gold medal. Four years later, Smyth was chosen to the Canada's men's team for the 1999 IIHF World Championship in Norway. As a result of the Oilers' short playoff seasons (the team made the second round twice and the Finals once in his 12-year tenure), Smyth was a mainstay on Canada's World Championship roster (the international tournament conflicted with the NHL's playoff schedule). The 1999 tournament marked the first of seven consecutive appearances for Smyth. He recorded two assists over nine games as Canada finished in fourth place, losing the bronze medal game to Sweden.

The following year in Russia, Smyth improved to an international career-high three goals and nine points over nine games. Canada finished fourth for the second consecutive year as they lost the bronze medal game to Finland. In preparation for the 2001 IIHF World Championship in Germany, Smyth was named team captain for Canada; it marked the first of five years he served in that role, earning him the nickname "Captain Canada." Smyth recorded two goals and five points over seven games, but Canada faced an early exit as they were eliminated by the United States in the quarter-final.

In December 2001, Smyth was selected to Canada's team for the 2002 Winter Olympics in Salt Lake City, Utah. It marked the first time he was selected to a national team when all NHL players were available (the league temporarily suspended play during the 2001–02 season to allow their players to participate). Smyth contributed one assist in six games, helping Canada win their first Olympic gold medal in ice hockey since 1952. It was also Smyth's first gold medal at the men's level. Later that year, he made his fourth consecutive appearance at the World Championship in Sweden. Canada was once again eliminated in the quarter-final, this time to Slovakia. Smyth had four goals and no assists over seven games.

After four years without a medal in World Championship competition, Smyth captained Canada to gold at the 2003 IIHF World Championship in Finland. He recorded two goals and four points over nine games, en route to a 3–2 win over Sweden in the final. Canada defended their gold medal in the following year in the Czech Republic. In a rematch of the previous year's final, Canada beat Sweden 5–3. In nine tournament games, Smyth contributed two goals and four points.

In September 2004, the NHL and NHL Players Association held the first World Cup of Hockey in eight years. Held outside of the NHL schedule (although league play was suspended for the 2004–05 season due to a lockout), all players were eligible to participate. Smyth was named to the national team and contributed three goals and an assist over six games. Canada won the World Cup title with a win over Finland in the final. The following year, all NHL players were again available for international competition at the 2005 IIHF World Championship in Austria, due to the ongoing lockout. It marked the first time that this was the case in tournament history. Smyth retained his captaincy and helped Canada to the gold medal game for the third straight year. Facing the Czech Republic, they were shut out 3–0, earning the silver medal.

In December 2005, he was named to Canada's Olympic team for the 2006 Winter Olympics in Turin, Italy. Canada failed to defend their gold medal from 2002, however, and were eliminated in the quarterfinal by Russia. Smyth was held to one assist in six games. He was also selected for the 2010 Winter Olympics summer roster for Team Canada in August 2009, but did not make the final roster cut.

The 2010 IIHF World Championship tournament in Germany would mark Smyth's last appearance for Canada, where he was named team captain for the sixth time, a Canadian record at the tournament. Early on in the tournament, he suffered an ankle injury during practice and was kept from the remainder of the competition. Canada lost the quarter-final to Russia that year. In 2012, he won the Spengler Cup playing for Canada, again serving as the team's captain.

== Playing style ==
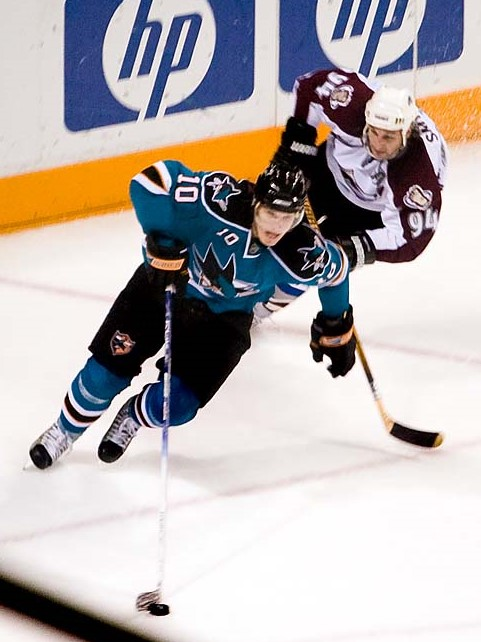
Ryan Smyth in pursuit of Christian Ehrhoff in 2008.

Smyth played in the style of a power forward, depending largely on his size and strength to contribute offensively. By positioning himself in front of the net, he earned most of his goals by tipping pucks in past the goaltender or scoring on rebounds. He did not possess particularly good shooting, stickhandling, or skating skills. He had been known to use a two-piece stick (composite shaft with wooden blade) with a flat blade, both of which were trends that largely went out of date during or before Smyth's career.

When the Oilers drafted him out of junior, Darryl Davis (son of scout Lorne Davis) said that General Manager Glen Sather was looking for someone with "lots of guts." Smyth was also known as a leader, having served as captain for Canada's World Championship teams on six occasions. He also served as an alternate captain on nearly all of the teams he played with in the NHL, save for his brief stint with the Islanders.

== Personal life ==
Smyth is married with four children. His wife, Stacey, owns a clothing store called Four.

His older brother, Kevin, played 58 games in the NHL for the Hartford Whalers.

== Awards and achievements ==
- 1994–95 WHL East Second All-Star Team
- 2006–07 – Played in NHL All-Star Game
- November 6, 2010 – Played in 1,000th career NHL game
- Winner of the 2012 Spengler Cup
- Won Gold with Team Canada at the 1995 World Junior Championship, 2002 Winter Olympics, 2003 and 2004 World Championships, and 2004 World Cup
- Smyth was made a member of the Order of Hockey in Canada in 2018.
- On February 4, 2020, he was announced as an inductee into the IIHF Hall of Fame. The induction ceremony was scheduled during the 2020 IIHF World Championship, but was delayed due to the COVID-19 pandemic. His induction was formally made at the medal ceremony of the 2024 IIHF World Championship.

== Career statistics ==
=== Regular season and playoffs ===
			Regular season					Playoffs
Season	Team	League	GP	G	A	Pts	PIM	GP	G	A	Pts	PIM
1991–92	Moose Jaw Warriors	WHL	2	0	0	0	0	—	—	—	—	—
1992–93	Moose Jaw Warriors	WHL	64	19	14	33	59	—	—	—	—	—
1993–94	Moose Jaw Warriors	WHL	72	50	55	105	88	—	—	—	—	—
1994–95	Moose Jaw Warriors	WHL	50	41	45	86	66	10	6	9	15	22
1994–95	Edmonton Oilers	NHL	3	0	0	0	0	—	—	—	—	—
1995–96	Cape Breton Oilers	AHL	9	6	5	11	4	—	—	—	—	—
1995–96	Edmonton Oilers	NHL	48	2	9	11	28	—	—	—	—	—
1996–97	Edmonton Oilers	NHL	82	39	22	61	76	12	5	5	10	12
1997–98	Edmonton Oilers	NHL	65	20	13	33	44	12	1	3	4	16
1998–99	Edmonton Oilers	NHL	71	13	18	31	62	3	3	0	3	0
1999–2000	Edmonton Oilers	NHL	82	28	26	54	58	5	1	0	1	6
2000–01	Edmonton Oilers	NHL	82	31	39	70	58	6	3	4	7	4
2001–02	Edmonton Oilers	NHL	61	15	35	50	48	—	—	—	—	—
2002–03	Edmonton Oilers	NHL	66	27	34	61	67	6	2	0	2	16
2003–04	Edmonton Oilers	NHL	82	23	36	59	70	—	—	—	—	—
2005–06	Edmonton Oilers	NHL	75	36	30	66	58	24	7	9	16	22
2006–07	Edmonton Oilers	NHL	53	31	22	53	38	—	—	—	—	—
2006–07	New York Islanders	NHL	18	5	10	15	14	5	1	3	4	4
2007–08	Colorado Avalanche	NHL	55	14	23	37	50	8	2	3	5	2
2008–09	Colorado Avalanche	NHL	77	26	33	59	62	—	—	—	—	—
2009–10	Los Angeles Kings	NHL	67	22	31	53	42	6	1	1	2	6
2010–11	Los Angeles Kings	NHL	82	23	24	47	35	6	2	3	5	0
2011–12	Edmonton Oilers	NHL	82	19	27	46	82	—	—	—	—	—
2012–13	Edmonton Oilers	NHL	47	2	11	13	40	—	—	—	—	—
2013–14	Edmonton Oilers	NHL	72	10	13	23	44	—	—	—	—	—
2015–16	Stony Plain Eagles	ChHL	1	1	1	2	0	8	5	8	13	12
2016–17	Stony Plain Eagles	ChHL	10	5	12	17	4	7	8	5	13	0
NHL totals			1,270	386	456	842	976	93	28	31	59	88

=== International ===
Year	Team	Event	Result	GP	G	A	Pts	PIM
1995	Canada	WJC	1st place, gold medalist(s)	7	2	5	7	4
1999	Canada	WC	4th	10	0	2	2	12
2000	Canada	WC	4th	9	3	6	9	0
2001	Canada	WC	5th	7	2	3	5	4
2002	Canada	OG	1st place, gold medalist(s)	6	0	1	1	0
2002	Canada	WC	6th	7	4	0	4	2
2003	Canada	WC	1st place, gold medalist(s)	9	2	2	4	2
2004	Canada	WC	1st place, gold medalist(s)	9	2	2	4	2
2004	Canada	WCH	1st place, gold medalist(s)	6	3	1	4	2
2005	Canada	WC	2nd place, silver medalist(s)	9	2	1	3	6
2006	Canada	OG	7th	6	0	1	1	4
2010	Canada	WC	7th	1	0	0	0	0
Junior totals				7	2	5	7	4
Senior totals				79	18	19	37	34

Awards and achievements
Preceded by Jason Bonsignore	Edmonton Oilers first-round draft pick 1994 (second of two)	Succeeded by Steve Kelly
