= Paul Comrie =

Canadian ice hockey player (born 1977)

- Born: February 7, 1977 (age 49) Edmonton, Alberta, Canada
- Height: 5 ft 11 in (180 cm)
- Weight: 195 lb (88 kg; 13 st 13 lb)
- Position: Centre
- Shot: Left
- Played for: Edmonton Oilers
- NHL draft: 224th overall, 1997; Tampa Bay Lightning
- Playing career: 1999–2000

Paul Gordon Comrie (born February 7, 1977) is a Canadian former professional ice hockey forward. He played in the National Hockey League (NHL) with the Edmonton Oilers during the 1999–00 season.

== Hockey player ==
Before his short professional career, Paul played for the Fort Saskatchewan Traders, and then for the University of Denver from 1996 until 1999. Comrie was an All-American and All-Academic while playing at the University of Denver as well as the Captain his senior year. He was selected in the 9th round of the 1997 NHL entry draft, 224th overall, by the Tampa Bay Lightning. On December 30, 1997, the Lightning traded Comrie, along with Roman Hamrlik, to the Edmonton Oilers (the team his brother, Mike Comrie, also played for) in exchange for Bryan Marchment, Steve Kelly, and Jason Bonsignore. He played in fifteen NHL games for the Oilers during the 1999–00 season. Comrie was forced to retire at the age of 24 due to concussion problems.

== Business career ==
Comrie, who studied business at the University of Denver, is the oldest son of Bill Comrie, founder of the home furnishings store The Brick. Following his retirement from hockey, Comrie entered into the family business, The Brick, as Case Goods Buyer in 2002 and Director of Imports in 2003. From 2004 onwards, Comrie was appointed to various executive positions and as a director of the Brick:

- President of United Furniture Warehouse LP 2004-2006
- Vice President, Merchandising, Furniture and Mattresses of the Brick Group Income Fund 2006-2008
- Chief Merchandising Officer of the Brick Group Income Fund 2008–2014
- Chief Executive Officer of Elements International 2014–Present

== Transactions ==
- December 20, 1997 – Comrie and Roman Hamrlik traded to Edmonton by Tampa Bay in exchange for Jason Bonsignore, Steve Kelly, and Bryan Marchment

== Personal life ==
Comrie's half-brother, Eric, plays goal for the Winnipeg Jets of the National Hockey League. He was selected 59th overall in the 2013 NHL draft by the Winnipeg Jets.

Comrie is the former brother-in-law of Hilary Duff, through brother Mike, who also played for the Oilers.

== Career statistics ==
=== Regular season and playoffs ===
			Regular season					Playoffs
Season	Team	League	GP	G	A	Pts	PIM	GP	G	A	Pts	PIM
1993–94	Fort Saskatchewan Traders	AJHL	55	7	23	30	50	6	0	1	1	2
1994–95	Fort Saskatchewan Traders	AJHL	51	30	37	67	121	—	—	—	—	—
1995–96	University of Denver	WCHA	38	13	10	23	61	—	—	—	—	—
1996–97	University of Denver	WCHA	40	21	28	49	72	—	—	—	—	—
1997–98	University of Denver	WCHA	33	17	23	40	72	—	—	—	—	—
1998–99	University of Denver	WCHA	40	18	31	49	84	—	—	—	—	—
1998–99	Hamilton Bulldogs	AHL	7	0	1	1	0	8	1	3	4	2
1999–00	Edmonton Oilers	NHL	15	1	2	3	4	—	—	—	—	—
1999–00	Hamilton Bulldogs	AHL	12	3	3	6	6	—	—	—	—	—
NHL totals			15	1	2	3	4	—	—	—	—	—

== Awards and honours ==
Award	Year
All-WCHA Third Team	1997–98
All-WCHA First Team	1998–99
AHCA West Second-Team All-American	1998–99
