= Eric Comrie =

Canadian ice hockey player (born 1995)

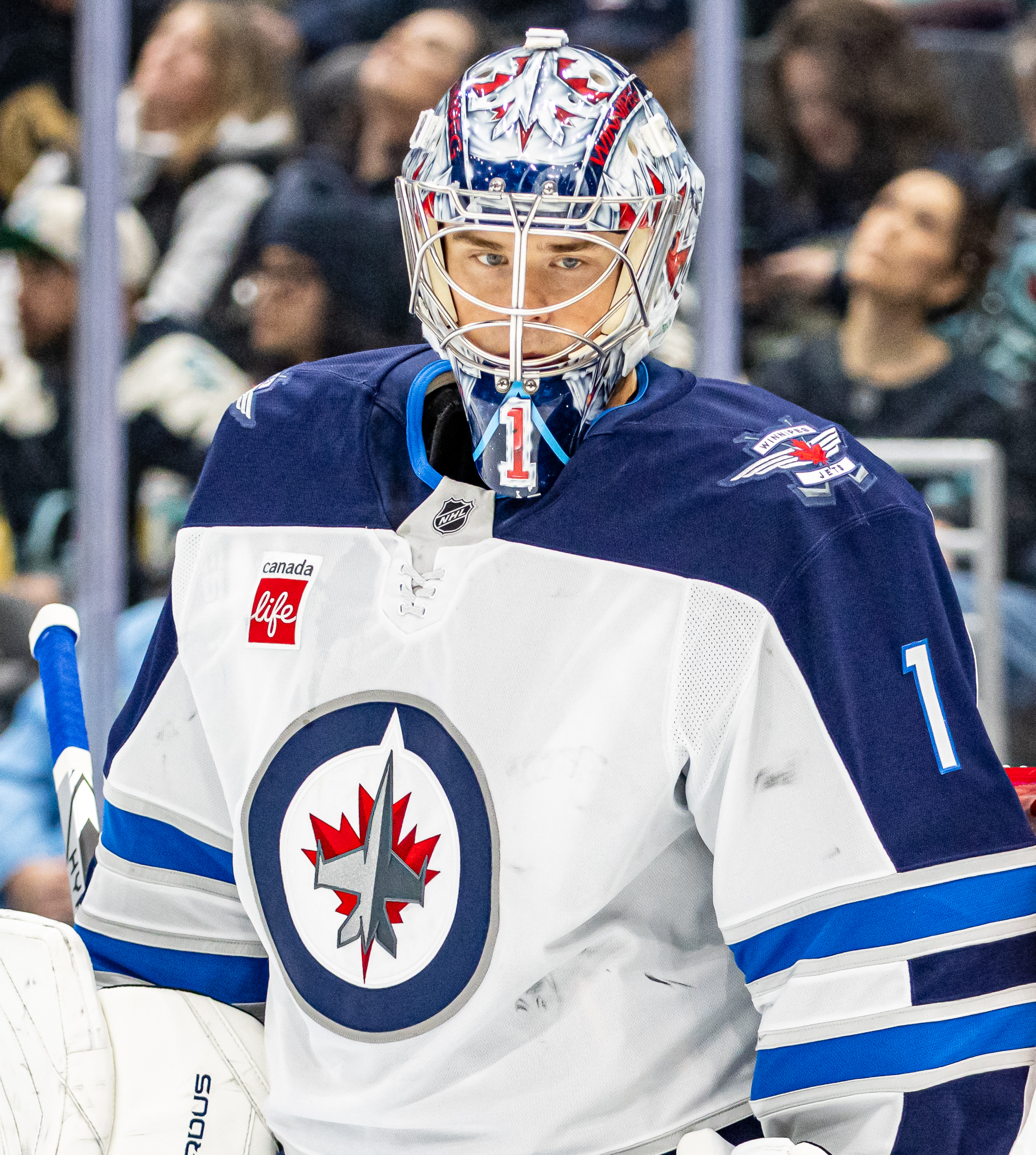
- Comrie with the Winnipeg Jets in 2025
- Born: July 6, 1995 (age 31) Edmonton, Alberta, Canada
- Height: 6 ft 1 in (185 cm)
- Weight: 175 lb (79 kg; 12 st 7 lb)
- Position: Goaltender
- Catches: Left
- NHL team (P) Cur. team Former teams: San Jose Sharks; San Jose Barracuda (AHL); Winnipeg Jets; Detroit Red Wings; New Jersey Devils; Buffalo Sabres
- NHL draft: 59th overall, 2013; Winnipeg Jets
- Playing career: 2014–present

Eric Comrie (born July 6, 1995) is a Canadian professional ice hockey player who is a goaltender for the San Jose Barracuda of the American Hockey League (AHL) while under contract to the San Jose Sharks of the National Hockey League (NHL). He was selected by the Jets in the second round (59th overall) in the 2013 NHL entry draft.

== Playing career ==
=== Amateur ===
Comrie was born in Edmonton, Alberta but moved to Newport Beach, California with his family when he was nine. He played minor ice hockey with the LA Selects (now the LA Jr. Kings) in the Tier 1 Elite Hockey League. As a youth, he played in the 2008 Quebec International Pee-Wee Hockey Tournament with the LA Selects. Comrie was drafted in the 1st round, 13th overall, by the Tri-City Americans in the 2010 WHL bantam draft. During the 2010–11 season, Comrie played for the Selects U16 team, posting a save % of .940 and a GAA of 1.34 over 19 games.

Comrie made his WHL debut on April 10, 2011, with the Americans in a playoff game against the Spokane Chiefs in relief of goaltender Drew Owsley in a 6–3 loss. During Comrie's rookie season during the 2011–12 season with Tri-City, he appeared in 31 games, posting a save percentage of .900. Comrie improved on his play in the 2012–13 season until a hip injury shut him down after 37 appearances. At the end of the season he was ranked 2nd amongst North American goaltenders by the NHL Central Scouting Service. Comrie was drafted in the 2nd round (59th overall) by the Winnipeg Jets. Comrie had a strong 2013–14 season, leading the WHL in save percentage (.925) and was named to the WHL (West) Second All Star team.

=== Professional ===
On December 24, 2013, the Jets signed Comrie to a three-year, entry-level contract. At the conclusion of the Americans' 2013–14 season, Comrie joined the Jets' American Hockey League (AHL) affiliate, the St. John's IceCaps; he went winless in two appearances. Comrie once again joined the IceCaps at the end of the Americans' season the following year, and went (2–1–0) in three games.

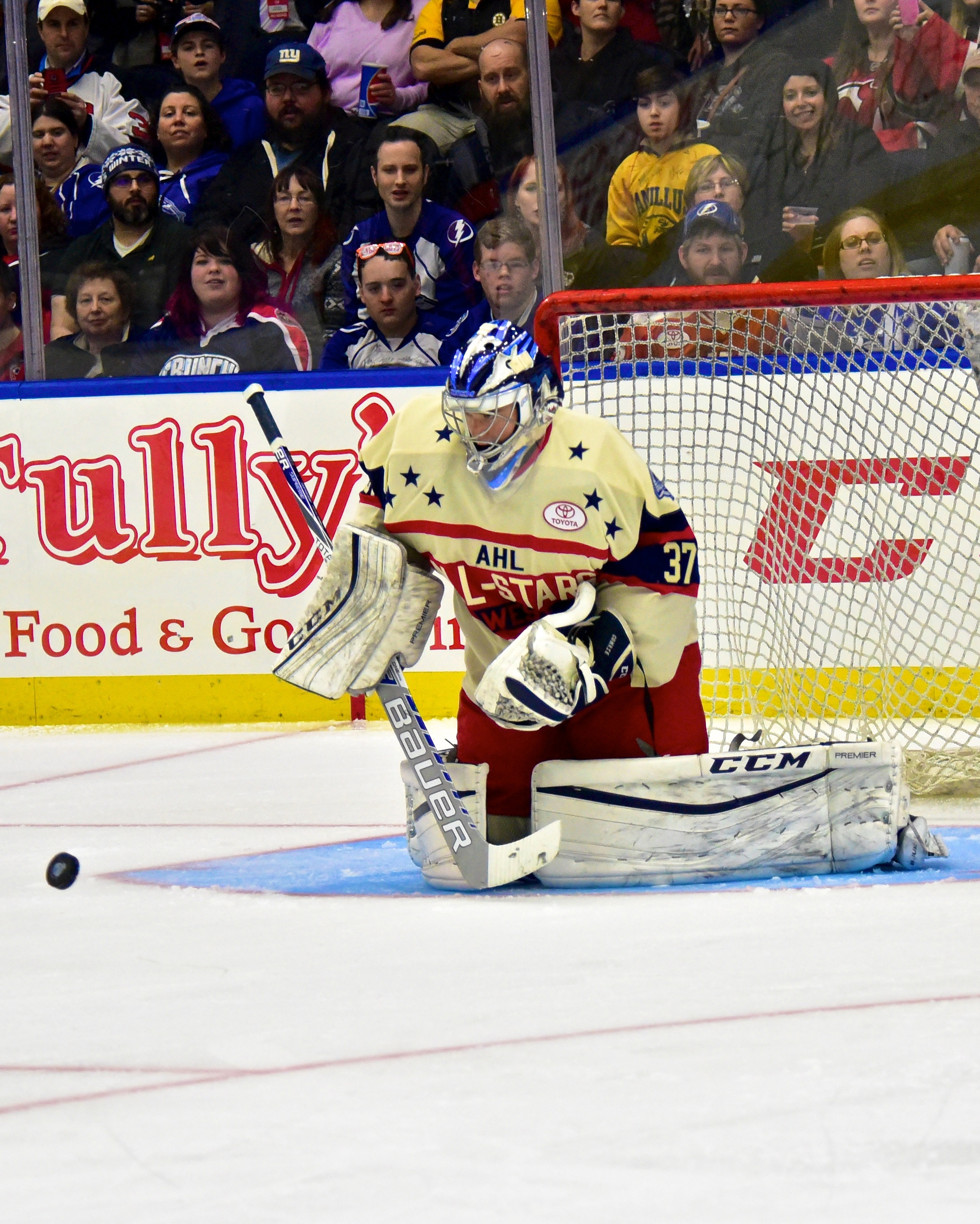
Comrie at the 2016 AHL All-Star Game

Comrie joined the AHL full-time for the 2015–16 season. The IceCaps moved and were renamed the Manitoba Moose. In his first full professional season, Comrie posted a 13–25–7 record. His numbers were similar the following year, going 18–25–2.

On April 5, 2017, Comrie received his first career recall by the Jets. He made his NHL debut on April 6 against the Columbus Blue Jackets, making 35 saves in a 5–4 win.

On September 7, 2019, the Jets signed Comrie to a two-year, $1.4 million contract extension. He was placed on waivers on September 30, and was claimed by the Arizona Coyotes the following day. After beginning the season with the Coyotes (but not making any appearances), Comrie was assigned to the team's AHL affiliate, the Tucson Roadrunners, on November 9 for conditioning purposes. On November 30, the Coyotes traded Comrie to the Detroit Red Wings in exchange for Vili Saarijärvi. In his first start of the season on December 10, Comrie allowed five goals on 30 shots in a 5–1 loss to his former team, the Jets. On December 19, Comrie returned to the Jets after being claimed off waivers.

After attending the Jets training camp, prior to the delayed 2020–21 season, Comrie was placed on waivers by Winnipeg and was subsequently claimed by the New Jersey Devils on January 12, 2021. On February 18, Comrie was reclaimed off waivers by the Jets.

On July 13, 2022, Comrie as a free agent from the Jets inked a two-year contract $3.6 million contract with the Buffalo Sabres.

Following the conclusion of his contract with the Sabres, Comrie returned to the Jets as a free agent, beginning his third stint with the club by signing a two-year, $1.65 million contract on July 1, 2024.

On July 1, 2026, Comrie signed a two-year, $2.3 million contract with the San Jose Sharks.

== International play ==
Medal record

Representing Canada

Ice hockey

World Championships
| Silver medal – second place | 2017 Germany/France | |

IIHF World U20 Championship
| Gold medal – first place | 2015 Canada | |

During the 2012–13 season Comrie played for Team Pacific 2012 World U-17 Hockey Challenge, finishing fifth. He went on to win a gold medal playing for Team Canada at the 2013 Ivan Hlinka Memorial Tournament. He also played for Team Canada in the U-20 2015 World Junior Ice Hockey Championships, helping lead them to a gold medal.

== Personal life ==
Comrie is the son of The Brick founder Bill Comrie, and the paternal half-brother of former NHL players Paul and Mike Comrie. In 2013–14 and again in 2014–15, Comrie was teammates with his younger brother, Ty, on the Tri-City Americans major junior hockey team.

He married his long time girlfriend, Haley Hull, in July 2022 and their first daughter was born in November 2023. The couple also have a son, born in the spring of 2025.

== Career statistics ==
=== Regular season and playoffs ===
| | | | Regular season | | | | | | | | | Playoffs |
| Season | Team | League | GP | W | L | OT | MIN | GA | SO | GAA | SV% | GP | W | L | MIN | GA | SO | GAA | SV% |
|---|---|---|---|---|---|---|---|---|---|---|---|---|---|---|---|---|---|---|---|
| 2010-11 | Tri-City Americans | WHL | — | — | — | — | — | — | — | — | — | 1 | 0 | 0 | 20 | 1 | 0 | 3.00 | .929 |
| 2011–12 | Tri-City Americans | WHL | 31 | 19 | 6 | 2 | 1663 | 74 | 3 | 2.67 | .900 | — | — | — | — | — | — | — | — |
| 2012–13 | Tri-City Americans | WHL | 37 | 20 | 14 | 3 | 2178 | 95 | 2 | 2.62 | .915 | — | — | — | — | — | — | — | — |
| 2013–14 | Tri-City Americans | WHL | 60 | 26 | 25 | 9 | 3523 | 151 | 4 | 2.57 | .924 | 5 | 1 | 4 | 295 | 17 | 0 | 3.46 | .917 |
| 2013–14 | St. John's IceCaps | AHL | 2 | 0 | 2 | 0 | 113 | 12 | 0 | 6.35 | .829 | — | — | — | — | — | — | — | — |
| 2014–15 | Tri-City Americans | WHL | 40 | 20 | 19 | 1 | 2402 | 115 | 1 | 2.87 | .914 | 4 | 0 | 4 | 0 | 256 | 18 | 4.22 | .894 |
| 2014–15 | St. John's IceCaps | AHL | 3 | 2 | 1 | 0 | 185 | 7 | 0 | 2.27 | .920 | — | — | — | — | — | — | — | — |
| 2015–16 | Manitoba Moose | AHL | 46 | 13 | 25 | 7 | 2600 | 135 | 1 | 3.12 | .907 | — | — | — | — | — | — | — | — |
| 2016–17 | Manitoba Moose | AHL | 51 | 19 | 26 | 8 | 2920 | 144 | 3 | 2.96 | .906 | — | — | — | — | — | — | — | — |
| 2016–17 | Winnipeg Jets | NHL | 1 | 1 | 0 | 0 | 60 | 4 | 0 | 4.00 | .897 | — | — | — | — | — | — | — | — |
| 2017–18 | Manitoba Moose | AHL | 34 | 18 | 13 | 3 | 2025 | 87 | 2 | 2.58 | .916 | 9 | 3 | 6 | 510 | 27 | 0 | 3.18 | .908 |
| 2017–18 | Winnipeg Jets | NHL | 3 | 1 | 2 | 0 | 180 | 12 | 0 | 4.00 | .872 | — | — | — | — | — | — | — | — |
| 2018–19 | Manitoba Moose | AHL | 47 | 25 | 16 | 4 | 2739 | 123 | 2 | 2.69 | .917 | — | — | — | — | — | — | — | — |
| 2018–19 | Winnipeg Jets | NHL | 1 | 0 | 1 | 0 | 60 | 5 | 0 | 5.00 | .821 | — | — | — | — | — | — | — | — |
| 2019–20 | Tucson Roadrunners | AHL | 4 | 4 | 0 | 0 | 240 | 11 | 0 | 2.75 | .900 | — | — | — | — | — | — | — | — |
| 2019–20 | Detroit Red Wings | NHL | 3 | 0 | 2 | 0 | 127 | 9 | 0 | 4.28 | .864 | — | — | — | — | — | — | — | — |
| 2019–20 | Manitoba Moose | AHL | 16 | 6 | 9 | 0 | 931 | 39 | 1 | 2.51 | .918 | — | — | — | — | — | — | — | — |
| 2020–21 | New Jersey Devils | NHL | 1 | 1 | 0 | 0 | 60 | 3 | 0 | 3.00 | .909 | — | — | — | — | — | — | — | — |
| 2020–21 | Manitoba Moose | AHL | 4 | 3 | 0 | 1 | 245 | 5 | 1 | 1.23 | .947 | — | — | — | — | — | — | — | — |
| 2021–22 | Winnipeg Jets | NHL | 19 | 10 | 5 | 1 | 1025 | 44 | 1 | 2.58 | .920 | — | — | — | — | — | — | — | — |
| 2022–23 | Buffalo Sabres | NHL | 19 | 9 | 9 | 1 | 1112 | 68 | 1 | 3.67 | .886 | — | — | — | — | — | — | — | — |
| 2022–23 | Rochester Americans | AHL | 3 | 1 | 2 | 0 | 178 | 9 | 0 | 3.03 | .898 | — | — | — | — | — | — | — | — |
| 2023–24 | Buffalo Sabres | NHL | 10 | 2 | 7 | 0 | 520 | 32 | 0 | 3.69 | .874 | — | — | — | — | — | — | — | — |
| 2023–24 | Rochester Americans | AHL | 4 | 3 | 1 | 0 | 239 | 9 | 1 | 2.26 | .934 | — | — | — | — | — | — | — | — |
| 2024–25 | Winnipeg Jets | NHL | 20 | 9 | 10 | 1 | 1179 | 44 | 2 | 2.39 | .914 | 3 | 0 | 0 | 43 | 1 | 0 | 1.40 | .923 |
| 2025–26 | Winnipeg Jets | NHL | 25 | 12 | 11 | 1 | 1382 | 72 | 0 | 3.13 | .890 | — | — | — | — | — | — | — | — |
| NHL totals | | | 102 | 45 | 47 | 4 | 5,703 | 293 | 4 | 3.11 | .896 | 3 | 0 | 0 | 43 | 1 | 0 | 1.40 | .923 |
