= United Furniture Warehouse =

Defunct Canadian retail furniture chain, now part of The Brick

- Company type: Subsidiary
- Industry: Retail
- Founded: 1981
- Founder: John Volken
- Defunct: 2017
- Headquarters: Edmonton, Alberta, Canada
- Products: Home furnishing
- Owner: Leon's
- Parent: The Brick (2004–2017)
- Website: www.ufw.com (Now redirects to www.thebrick.com/clearance-centre)

United Furniture Warehouse (UFW) was a Canadian retail furniture chain operating locations in Western Canada and Ontario. The company billed itself as "offering warehouse-style shopping at the lowest possible prices." The company was founded in 1981 by John Volken, an immigrant who arrived in Canada from East Germany in 1960 at the age of 18. It "was one of the first businesses to sell at warehouse prices and to operate without commission sales staff or in-store decor."

In 2001, the company had sales of CAN$210 million (approx. US$135 million). By 2003, the company had expanded to over 150 stores including 39 stores in the northwestern United States. With stores in Washington, Idaho, Oregon and Utah, it was "one of the most widespread retail furniture chains in North America" and "one of Canada's most successful stateside retailers". However, in early 2003 they were forced to close all but 5 of their stores in the United States. By early 2004, the company had completely exited the U.S. market.

As of March 2004, the company had reduced its size to 81 stores and was acquired by another national furniture retailer, The Brick. In 2006, The Brick rebranded 24 of these under its own name in an attempt to save on advertising costs and increase sales, which had fallen 10.8% in the third quarter of 2005 for established UFW stores.

As of February 2010, the company had reduced its size to 36 stores across Canada - 15 in Ontario, 10 in Alberta, 5 in British Columbia, 3 in each of Saskatchewan and Manitoba. Some time later, they re-entered the U.S. market with stores in Bellingham and Mount Vernon in Washington. Those two stores are still open, despite the United Furniture Warehouse name being retired in 2018.

As of January 2014, the company had reduced its size yet again. Now there were 24 United Furniture Warehouse stores across Canada - 8 in each of Alberta and Ontario, 2 in British Columbia, and 3 in each of Saskatchewan and Manitoba.

As of March 2017, the number of stores had decreased to 12. All UFW stores had been re-branded as UFW/The Brick Clearance Centre by that time. Stores have a mixture of new items on display, as well as clearance items. Later that year in July, all remaining UFW locations were switched to a new branding called “The Brick Outlet”, along with renaming The Brick Clearance Centre locations. The Calgary location is the last remaining location with the original name.

== Advertisements ==
United Furniture Warehouse had a well-known musical cue at the end of its broadcast ads, including the phrase "United Furniture Warehouse" sung in bass, followed closely by a "bump bump!" sound effect— a pair of orchestral hits that are simultaneous to the flashing of the company's logo on the screen. In one of its commercials, they poked fun at this fact, with an employee singing the jingle and a group of children pointing out, "You forgot the bump bump!" One commentator wrote the jingle was "maddeningly catchy". American actor Steve Landesberg was prominently featured in many of the company's television commercials during the 1990s.
