= Jason Bonsignore =

American ice hockey player (born 1976)

- Born: April 15, 1976 (age 50) Rochester, New York, U.S.
- Height: 6 ft 4 in (193 cm)
- Weight: 220 lb (100 kg; 15 st 10 lb)
- Position: Center
- Shot: Right
- Played for: Edmonton Oilers; Tampa Bay Lightning
- National team: United States
- NHL draft: 4th overall, 1994; Edmonton Oilers
- Playing career: 1994–2008

Jason M. Bonsignore (born April 15, 1976) is an American former professional ice hockey forward and speedway promoter and racer.

== Early life ==
Bonsignore was born in Rochester, New York. As a youth, Bonsignore played in the 1990 Quebec International Pee-Wee Hockey Tournament with a minor ice hockey team from Rochester.

== Career ==
Bonsignore was a First Round draft choice in the OHL by the Newmarket Royals and went on to star in the league with the Royals, then Niagara Falls Thunder, where he was an asst Captain and finally with Sudbury Wolves where he was OHL player of the week in January of 95 and set a Wolves record for most game winning goals in the playoffs. He was drafted in the first round of the 1994 NHL entry draft, fourth overall, by the Edmonton Oilers, from the Niagara Falls in the Ontario Hockey League. While playing for the Oilers' American Hockey League farm team in the 1997–98 season, he was traded to the Tampa Bay Lightning. He was Tampa Bay's leading rookie scorer his first year while also earning International Hockey League player of the week recognition during a short stay with Tampa's farm team in Cleveland. In his 1998–99 season with Tampa, he finished the year as a regular with the Lightning.

Not given a qualifying offer by the Lightning, Bonsignore became an unrestricted free agent and signed with the Toronto Maple Leafs organization for the 1999–2000 season. He was a late cut at training camp and was assigned to their AHL farm team in St John's. Bonsignore suffered a season-ending ankle injury mid season, and asked for a release.

He chose to sit out the next two years due to the ankle injury and personal reasons, then returned in the 2002–03 season to play with the AHL franchises in Springfield and Lowell, where he was runner up for the Brian Pad Comeback Player of the year award given out by the Professional Hockey Players Association. He tried out with the NHL's Atlanta Thrashers in 2003 but was released towards the end of training camp.

From the 2003–04 through the 2007–08 seasons, Bonsignore played hockey in the ECHL, Switzerland, Finland and Norway. While in Switzerland he won the Player of the month award for February.

In 2007–08, Bonsignore returned to North America, where he tried to rehabilitate from a groin injury suffered in Norway while playing a few games with the Fresno Falcons. At the time the New Jersey Devils signed him for their farm team, the Trenton Devils, where he finished the year and ended his career as a professional player.

Internationally, Bonsignore was the leading scorer on the USA Select 16 and 17 National teams and also spent time with the US Olympic team. He twice represented the USA in the World Junior Championships.

Bonsignore later coached Rochester Red Wings minor ice hockey team, and signed to play with the Hamilton Steelhawks in January 2016.

== Transactions ==
- December 30, 1997 – Edmonton trades Bonsignore, Bryan Marchment and Steve Kelly to Tampa Bay in exchange for Roman Hamrlík and the rights to Paul Comrie.
- July 15, 1999 – Toronto signs Bonsignore.
- December 13, 2002 – Phoenix signs Bonsignore.
- September 21, 2003 – Atlanta releases Bonsignore from NHL tryout during training camp.

== Career statistics ==
=== Regular season and playoffs ===
			Regular season					Playoffs
Season	Team	League	GP	G	A	Pts	PIM	GP	G	A	Pts	PIM
1990–91	Greece Athena High School	HS-NY	18	24	18	42	—	—	—	—	—	—
1991–92	Greece Athena High School	HS-NY	18	33	33	66	—	—	—	—	—	—
1991–92	Rochester Jr. Americans	EmJHL	18	31	29	60	42	—	—	—	—	—
1992–93	Newmarket Royals	OHL	66	22	20	42	6	7	0	3	3	0
1993–94	Newmarket Royals	OHL	17	7	17	24	22	—	—	—	—	—
1993–94	Niagara Falls Thunder	OHL	41	15	47	62	41	—	—	—	—	—
1993–94	United States National Team	Intl	5	0	2	2	0	—	—	—	—	—
1994–95	Niagara Falls Thunder	OHL	26	12	21	33	51	—	—	—	—	—
1994–95	Sudbury Wolves	OHL	23	15	14	29	45	17	13	10	23	12
1994–95	Edmonton Oilers	NHL	1	1	0	1	0	—	—	—	—	—
1995–96	Sudbury Wolves	OHL	18	10	16	26	37	—	—	—	—	—
1995–96	Cape Breton Oilers	AHL	12	1	4	5	12	—	—	—	—	—
1995–96	Edmonton Oilers	NHL	20	0	2	2	4	—	—	—	—	—
1996–97	Hamilton Bulldogs	AHL	78	21	33	54	78	7	0	0	0	2
1997–98	Hamilton Bulldogs	AHL	8	0	2	2	14	—	—	—	—	—
1997–98	Tampa Bay Lightning	NHL	35	2	8	10	22	—	—	—	—	—
1997–98	San Antonio Dragons	IHL	22	3	8	11	34	—	—	—	—	—
1997–98	Cleveland Lumberjacks	IHL	6	4	0	4	32	8	1	1	2	20
1998–99	Tampa Bay Lightning	NHL	23	0	3	3	8	—	—	—	—	—
1998–99	Cleveland Lumberjacks	IHL	48	14	19	33	68	—	—	—	—	—
1999–00	St. John's Maple Leafs	AHL	29	6	13	19	30	—	—	—	—	—
2002–03	Springfield Falcons	AHL	37	9	12	21	39	—	—	—	—	—
2002–03	Lowell Lock Monsters	AHL	12	1	4	5	8	—	—	—	—	—
2003–04	South Carolina Stingrays	ECHL	5	2	5	7	2	—	—	—	—	—
2003–04	EHC Biel	SWI-2	9	9	3	12	6	4	2	2	4	51
2004–05	South Carolina Stingrays	ECHL	1	0	0	0	0	—	—	—	—	—
2004–05	Las Vegas Wranglers	ECHL	18	4	8	12	51	—	—	—	—	—
2005–06	Pelicans	SM-l	7	4	1	5	18	—	—	—	—	—
2005–06	Ilves	SM-l	4	0	1	1	4	—	—	—	—	—
2005–06	Trondheim Black Panthers	NOR	17	6	6	12	53	—	—	—	—	—
2007–08	Fresno Falcons	ECHL	7	0	2	2	10	—	—	—	—	—
2007–08	Trenton Devils	ECHL	21	1	10	11	24	—	—	—	—	—
2015–16	Hamilton Steelhawks	ACH	4	0	2	2	16	—	—	—	—	—
AHL totals			176	38	68	106	181	7	0	0	0	4
NHL totals			79	3	13	16	34	—	—	—	—	—

=== International ===
Year	Team	Event	GP	G	A	Pts	PIM
1994	United States	WJC	7	0	0	0	26
1995	United States	WJC	7	2	2	4	6
Junior totals			14	2	2	4	32

Preceded by Nick Stajduhar	Edmonton Oilers first-round draft pick 1994	Succeeded by Ryan Smyth
