= Magnus Arvedson =

Swedish ice hockey player

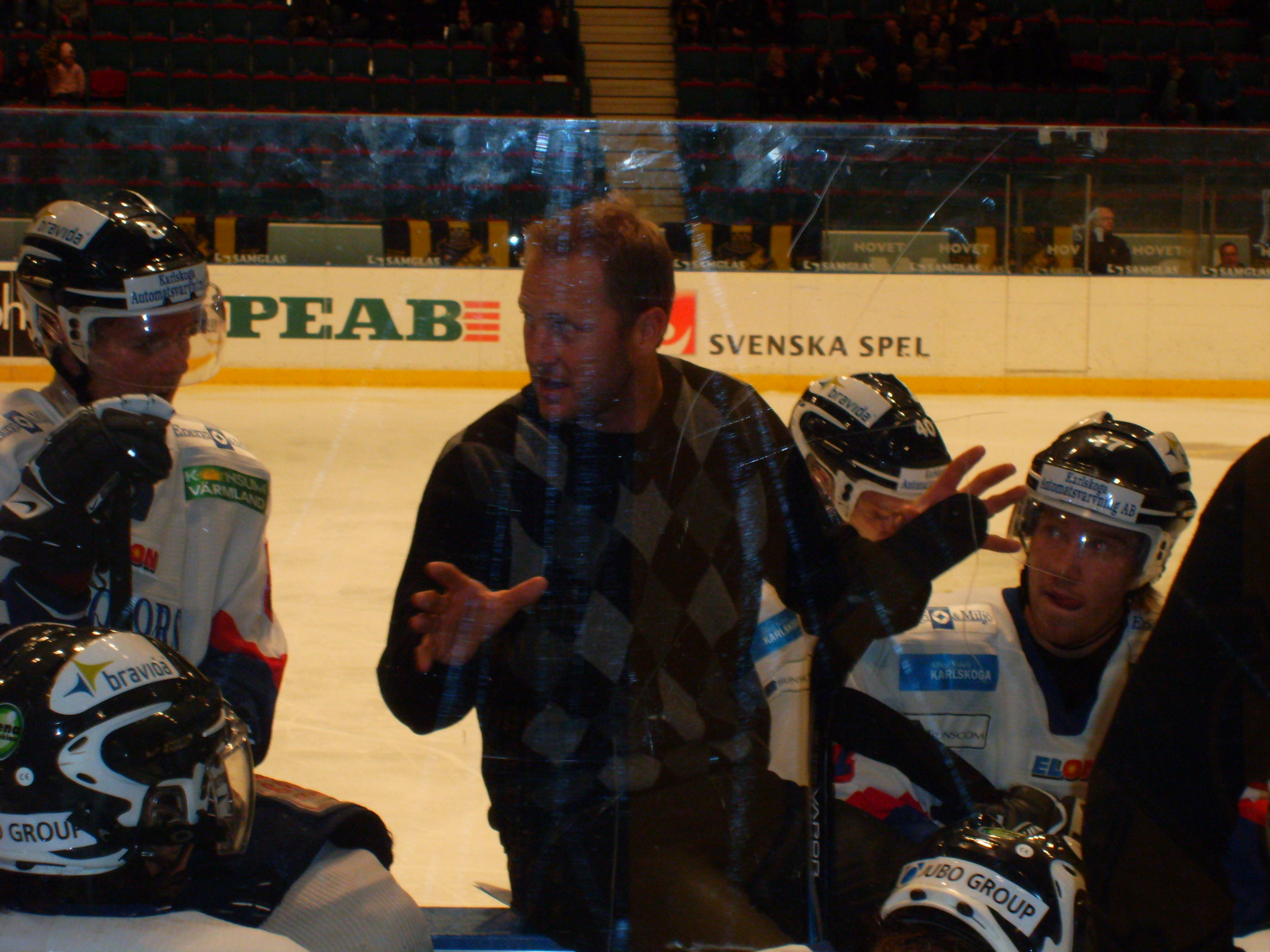
- Born: 25 November 1971 (age 54) Karlstad, Sweden
- Height: 6 ft 2 in (188 cm)
- Weight: 200 lb (91 kg; 14 st 4 lb)
- Position: Left wing
- Shot: Left
- Played for: Färjestads BK; Ottawa Senators; Vancouver Canucks
- National team: Sweden
- NHL draft: 119th overall, 1997; Ottawa Senators
- Playing career: 1993–2004

Magnus Karl Olof Arvedson (born 25 November 1971) is a Swedish former professional ice hockey left winger who played seven seasons in the National Hockey League for the Ottawa Senators and Vancouver Canucks. He also competed in the men's ice hockey tournament at the 2002 Winter Olympics.

== Playing career ==
A late bloomer, Arvedson didn't become a regular in the Swedish Elite League until 1994 at the age of 23. However, over the next few seasons he became a top performer with Färjestads BK, and was selected to represent Sweden at the 1997 World Championships. Following a strong performance there in helping his team to a silver medal, Arvedson was selected 119th overall in the 1997 NHL entry draft by the Ottawa Senators.

Arvedson stepped straight into Ottawa's lineup in the 1997–98 season, establishing himself as a top-notch defensive forward and finishing the year with 26 points. In 1998–99, he would have the strongest year of his career - promoted to a scoring line, he finished the season with 21 goals and 47 points. He also finished as runner up to Jere Lehtinen in voting for the Frank J. Selke Trophy as the NHL's top defensive forward, losing a close vote (Lehtinen had 23 1st-place votes to Arvedson's 19).

Arvedson continued his strong play over the next two seasons, although he would be hobbled by the injury bug, missing over 30 games both years. However, when healthy his offensive numbers continued to improve, as he recorded 32 goals and 61 points in just 98 games between 1999 and 2001. However, his production (or lack thereof) in the playoffs was starting to become an issue. In 22 career playoff games, he had yet to score a goal and had added a meagre two assists, and took a large portion of the blame for the playoff woes of the Senators, who had been knocked out in the first round three years in a row after excellent regular seasons.

Healthy again in 2001–02, Arvedson registered 12 goals and 39 points, and finished top-10 in Selke voting. He did manage his first two playoff goals, although he was again criticized for his performance as Ottawa was knocked out in the second round by the Toronto Maple Leafs. In 2002–03, he recorded 16 goals and 37 points, but added just a single playoff goal in 18 games as the Senators were knocked out in the conference finals.

Looking to move in a different direction, Ottawa showed limited interest in re-signing Arvedson when he became an unrestricted free agent, and he signed with the Vancouver Canucks for the 2003–04 season. After a slow start, Arvedson caught fire when placed mid-season on a line with Daniel and Henrik Sedin. However, while in the middle of the best goal-scoring streak of his career, six goals in five games, he took a knee-on-knee hit from Bryan Marchment of the Toronto Maple Leafs, ending his season and ultimately his NHL career.

In the summer of 2004, with the 2004 NHL work stoppage impending, he signed with his old club Färjestads BK, for the upcoming year. However, during a pre-season game he injured his back which forced him to retire.

In 434 career NHL games, Arvedson recorded 100 goals and 125 assists for 225 points, along with 241 penalty minutes. He also added 3 goals and 8 assists for 11 points in 52 playoff games.

== Coaching career ==
On 30 March 2007 he became the new head coach of the Swedish Elitserien club Mora IK. After Mora IK had played Kvalserien 2008 and lost its Elitserien status, Arvedson became the new head coach of the Swedish HockeyAllsvenskan club Bofors IK on 9 April 2008. He was replaced midseason after his team was at the bottom of the standings.

He coached Sweden's Division-2 team, Forshaga IF for the 2011–12 season.

== Career statistics ==
=== Regular season and playoffs ===
			Regular season					Playoffs
Season	Team	League	GP	G	A	Pts	PIM	GP	G	A	Pts	PIM
1990–91	Örebro IK	Div.1	29	7	11	18	12	2	0	1	1	2
1991–92	Örebro IK	Div.1	32	12	21	33	30	7	4	4	8	4
1992–93	Örebro IK	Div.1	36	11	18	29	34	6	2	1	3	0
1993–94	Färjestad BK	SEL	16	1	7	8	10	—	—	—	—	—
1993–94	Färjestad BK	Allsv	18	4	2	6	30	3	2	0	2	0
1994–95	Färjestad BK	SEL	36	1	6	7	45	4	0	0	0	6
1995–96	Färjestad BK	SEL	40	10	14	24	40	8	0	2	2	10
1996–97	Färjestad BK	SEL	48	13	11	24	36	14	4	7	11	8
1997–98	Ottawa Senators	NHL	61	11	15	26	36	11	0	1	1	6
1998–99	Ottawa Senators	NHL	80	21	26	47	50	3	0	1	1	2
1999–00	Ottawa Senators	NHL	47	15	13	28	36	6	0	0	0	6
2000–01	Ottawa Senators	NHL	51	17	16	33	24	2	0	0	0	0
2001–02	Ottawa Senators	NHL	74	12	27	39	35	12	2	1	3	4
2002–03	Ottawa Senators	NHL	80	16	20	36	48	18	1	5	6	16
2003–04	Vancouver Canucks	NHL	41	8	7	15	12	—	—	—	—	—
SEL totals			140	25	38	63	131	26	4	9	13	24
NHL totals			434	100	124	224	241	52	3	8	11	34

=== International ===
Year	Team	Event	Result	GP	G	A	Pts	PIM
1997	Sweden	WC	2nd place, silver medalist(s)	10	2	1	3	6
2002	Sweden	OG	5th	4	0	0	0	0
Senior totals				14	2	1	3	6
