= Mike Comrie =

Canadian ice hockey player (born 1980)

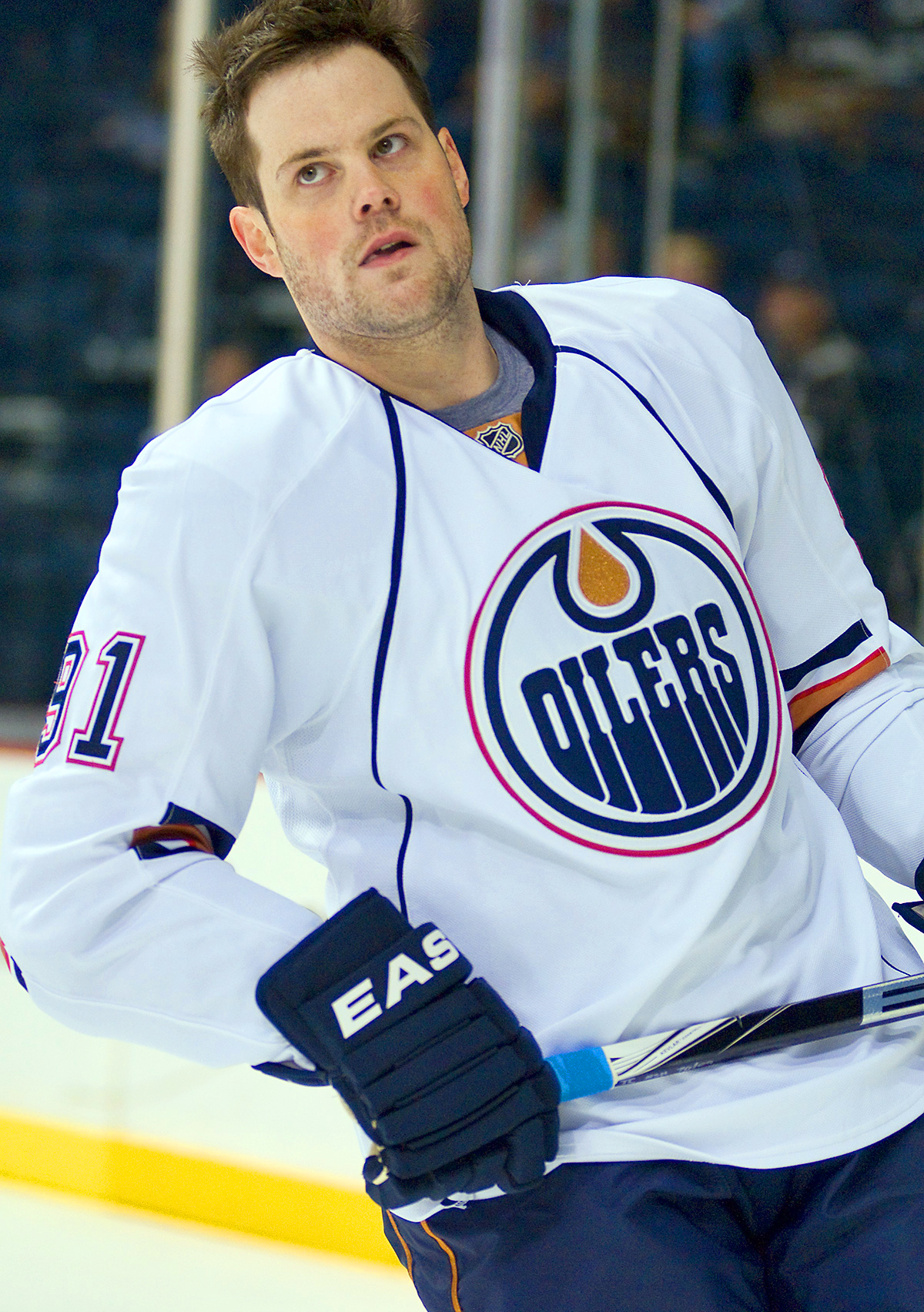
- Comrie with the Edmonton Oilers in 2009
- Born: September 11, 1980 (age 46) Edmonton, Alberta, Canada
- Height: 5 ft 10 in (178 cm)
- Weight: 185 lb (84 kg; 13 st 3 lb)
- Position: Centre
- Shot: Left
- Played for: Edmonton Oilers; Philadelphia Flyers; Phoenix Coyotes; Färjestad BK; Ottawa Senators; New York Islanders; Pittsburgh Penguins
- National team: Canada
- NHL draft: 91st overall, 1999; Edmonton Oilers
- Playing career: 2000–2011

Michael William Comrie (born September 11, 1980) is a Canadian former professional ice hockey player. During his 13-year National Hockey League (NHL) career he played with the Edmonton Oilers, Philadelphia Flyers, Phoenix Coyotes, Ottawa Senators, New York Islanders, and the Pittsburgh Penguins. He retired in early 2012 after undergoing hip surgery for the third time.

== Playing career ==
Mike Comrie was born and raised in Edmonton, Alberta, and attended Jasper Place High School. As a youth, he played in the 1993 Quebec International Pee-Wee Hockey Tournament with a minor ice hockey team from the Whitemud region of Edmonton, Alberta. He was drafted in the third round, ninety-first overall, in the 1999 NHL entry draft by his hometown Edmonton Oilers out of the University of Michigan. He would go on to the Canadian Western Hockey League (WHL) for 37 games before being called up to play for the Edmonton Oilers

=== Edmonton Oilers ===
Comrie left the WHL's Kootenay Ice midway through the 2000–01 season, signing an incentive-laden $10-million three-year deal with the Oilers, which, when all achievable bonuses were included, was well above the league maximum for the base salaries of 2001 draftees of $1.13 million a year. Although Comrie was a free agent as a result of playing one year of major junior hockey as an overage player after leaving college (due to a loophole established by Mike Van Ryn), entry-level salary restrictions still applied to Comrie's contract, with free-agent status allowing Comrie to sign with any team he desired. In Edmonton Comrie instantly become a fan favourite and hometown hero. He was an offensive threat during his first couple seasons with the team, tallying a total of 133 points in 192 games from 2001 to 2003.

=== Departure from Edmonton ===
After a lacklustre training camp in the pre-season, Comrie's status as local hero in Edmonton started to change dramatically, after he elected to hold out in a contract dispute for more than 30 games into the 2003–04 season. The Oilers then-General Manager, Kevin Lowe, was reportedly willing to trade Comrie to the Anaheim Ducks for Corey Perry and a first round draft pick, but within that deal sought to have Comrie reimburse the Oilers $2.5 million, which was part of the bonus money he earned from his entry-level contract. After this deal fell through, Comrie was dealt to the Philadelphia Flyers in December 2003, for Jeff Woywitka, a first round selection in 2004 (Rob Schremp) and a third round selection in 2005 (Danny Syvret).

=== Philadelphia Flyers and Phoenix Coyotes ===
Comrie played only 21 games for Philadelphia before being traded to the Phoenix Coyotes for Sean Burke, Branko Radivojevic and the rights to Ben Eager.

During the 2004–05 NHL lockout, he signed with Färjestad BK of the Elitserien and played ten games with them, before leaving in December 2004. Following an agreement made in July 2005, between the NHL and NHLPA members to resume hockey operations and play, Comrie would return to the Coyotes for the 2005–06 NHL season, where he would record his second 30-goal season in the NHL. The Coyotes would then re-sign Comrie to a new, one-year contract worth $3 million, on August 4, 2006.

On January 3, 2007, Comrie was traded to the Ottawa Senators in exchange for Senators prospect Alexei Kaigorodov.

=== Ottawa Senators and New York Islanders ===
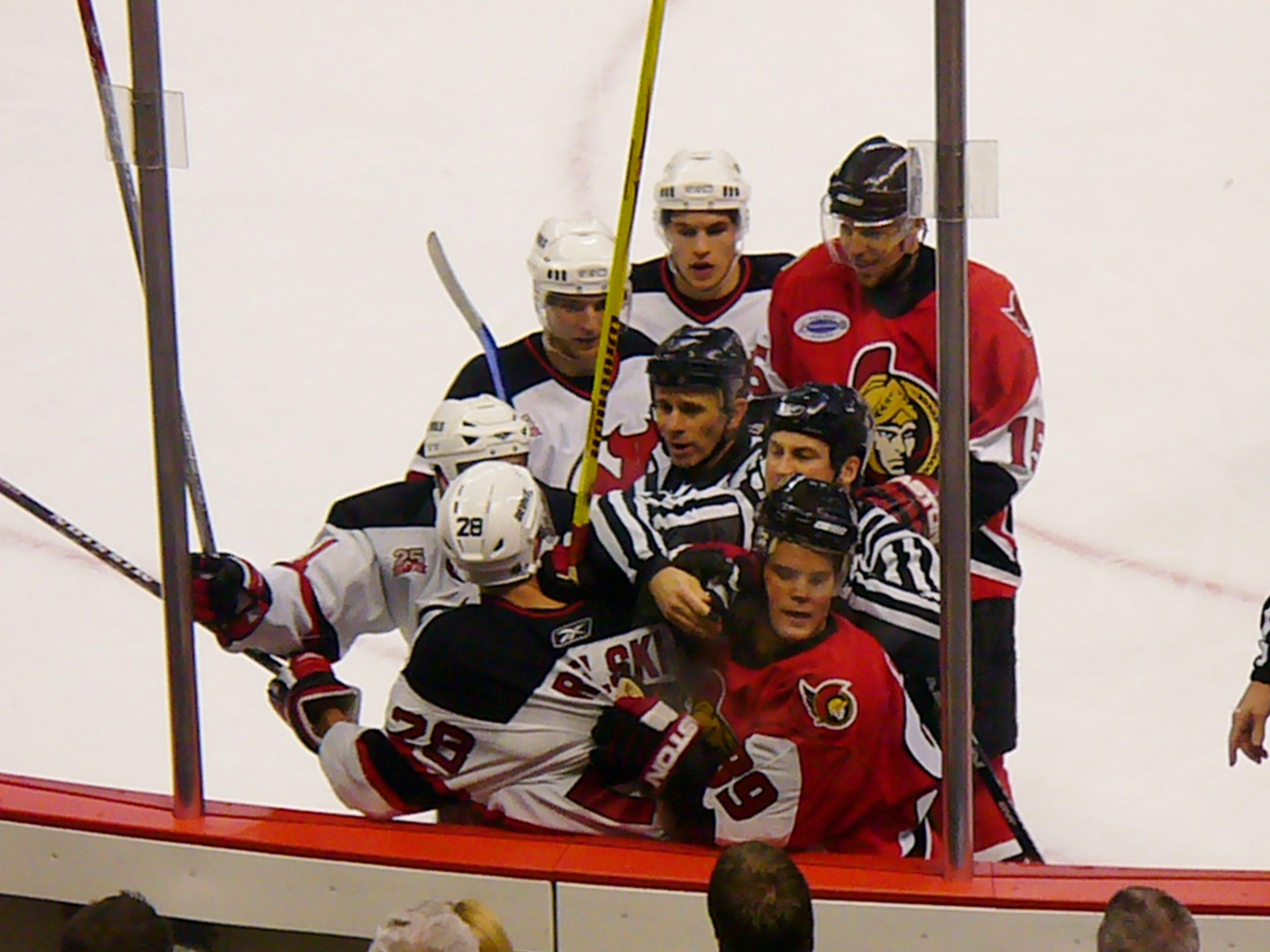
Comrie (right foreground) with the Ottawa Senators, fighting with Brian Rafalski as referees attempt to break it up

Comrie scored his first goal for the Senators versus the Boston Bruins on January 9, 2007, at Scotiabank Place in Ottawa, Ontario. Whenever Comrie scored a goal at Scotiabank Place, his goal song was "Black Gloves" by the Belgian band Goose. He helped Ottawa throughout the playoffs despite having an injured shoulder that required local anesthetic to numb the pain, this prevented him from reaching down to tie his skates. The Senators made it to the Stanley Cup Final, losing to the Anaheim Ducks, in a 4–1 series decision. Prior to the loss, the Senators eliminated the Pittsburgh Penguins, New Jersey Devils, and Buffalo Sabres all in five games.

On July 5, 2007, Mike Comrie signed a one-year contract worth $3.375 million with the New York Islanders as an unrestricted free agent. Before the trade deadline on February 26, 2008, the New York Islanders re-signed Comrie to a new one-year contract worth $4 million. Comrie would be traded back to the Senators on February 20, 2009, with Chris Campoli, in exchange for Dean McAmmond and a San Jose Sharks 2009 first round draft pick.

=== Return to the Oilers ===
On September 10, 2009, Mike Comrie signed a one-year contract worth $1.125 million with the team he began his NHL career with, returning to the Edmonton Oilers after six years, for their upcoming 2009–10 NHL season. Comrie chose to wear No. 91 (his overall draft selection number), as his familiar jersey No. 89 (which he wore during his first go-round with the team), was taken by Sam Gagner.

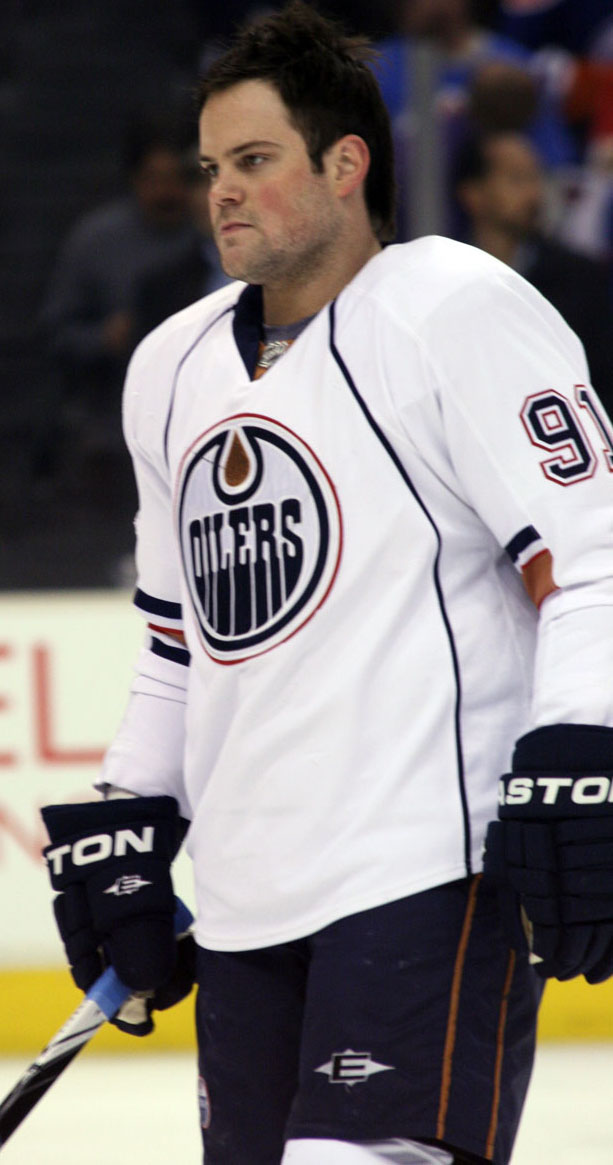
Comrie playing for the Edmonton Oilers, April 2010

Comrie made his return to Edmonton a night to remember, in a 4–0 pre-season win over the Florida Panthers, on September 18, 2009. Comrie assisted on all four of the goals scored and registered a fight, squaring off with the Panthers' Eric Himelfarb, to which Comrie received a standing ovation from the Rexall Place crowd, who promptly chanted his name as he took his place inside the penalty box.

On November 17, Comrie was placed on the NHL long term injury reserve list with mononucleosis and was expected to be out until late January. He had 5 goals and 8 points, in 16 games. Comrie would make his return to the Oilers line-up on February 1, 2010, recording an assist in a 4–2 victory over the Carolina Hurricanes. He finished out the rest of the season tallying 13 goals and 21 points, in 43 games.

Mike Comrie became an unrestricted free agent on July 1, 2010, with the Oilers opting not to re-sign him for the 2010–11 season.

=== Pittsburgh Penguins ===
On September 3, 2010, Mike Comrie signed a one-year contract worth $500,000 with the Pittsburgh Penguins, joining the franchise that drafted his uncle Fred, in 1973. On September 22, 2010, Comrie scored the very first goal inside of the new Consol Energy Center, 81 seconds into the Penguins' 5-1 exhibition game victory over the Detroit Red Wings. Due to a nagging hip injury, Comrie was sidelined for much of the regular season. He scored his first goal as a Penguin during their 82nd and final game of the season, on an empty Atlanta Thrashers net. It was the last goal scored in Thrashers's home Philips Arena before the team relocated to Winnipeg in the off season.

== Post-playing career ==
After undergoing hip surgery for the third time, Comrie retired from hockey on February 13, 2012.

Following his retirement from hockey, Comrie transitioned into a financial advisory role as a principal at the wealth management firm, HPM Partners. He advises professional athletes on investments and managing their finances for life after sports.

== Personal life ==
Comrie's father, Bill, and his uncles, Fred and John, are the founders of The Brick furniture company, which was sold in 2012 for $700 million. Comrie's mother, Theresa, died of cancer in 1990. Comrie has two older siblings; a sister, Cathy, and a brother, Paul, who played with the Oilers briefly, before Mike was drafted by them. Comrie also has two hockey playing younger half-brothers from his father's second marriage, Eric, a goaltender who was selected by the Winnipeg Jets in the 2013 NHL entry draft and Ty, who plays center.

Comrie began dating American actress and singer Hilary Duff in the summer of 2007. The couple announced their engagement in February 2010, and married on August 14, 2010, in Santa Barbara. They have a son born March 20, 2012. On January 10, 2014, the couple announced their separation. In February 2015, Duff filed for divorce from Comrie, citing irreconcilable differences, and sought primary custody of their son. The divorce was finalized in February 2016.

Presently, Comrie resides in the Los Angeles area and since 2019, has been in a relationship with Brooke Grant, a former General Manager of the Esports brand, FaZe Clan. Both are also known for their philanthropic work.

== Career statistics ==
=== Regular season and playoffs ===
			Regular season					Playoffs
Season	Team	League	GP	G	A	Pts	PIM	GP	G	A	Pts	PIM
1995–96	Edmonton Canadians	AMBHL	33	51	52	103	—	—	—	—	—	—
1996–97	St. Albert Saints	AJHL	63	37	41	78	44	—	—	—	—	—
1997–98	St. Albert Saints	AJHL	58	60	78	138	134	19	24	24	48	51
1998–99	University of Michigan	CCHA	42	19	25	44	38	—	—	—	—	—
1999–00	University of Michigan	CCHA	40	24	35	59	95	—	—	—	—	—
2000–01	Kootenay Ice	WHL	37	39	40	79	79	—	—	—	—	—
2000–01	Edmonton Oilers	NHL	41	8	14	22	14	6	1	2	3	0
2001–02	Edmonton Oilers	NHL	82	33	27	60	45	—	—	—	—	—
2002–03	Edmonton Oilers	NHL	69	20	31	51	90	6	1	0	1	10
2003–04	Philadelphia Flyers	NHL	21	4	5	9	12	—	—	—	—	—
2003–04	Phoenix Coyotes	NHL	28	8	7	15	16	—	—	—	—	—
2004–05	Färjestad BK	SEL	10	1	6	7	10	—	—	—	—	—
2005–06	Phoenix Coyotes	NHL	80	30	30	60	55	—	—	—	—	—
2006–07	Phoenix Coyotes	NHL	24	7	13	20	20	—	—	—	—	—
2006–07	Ottawa Senators	NHL	41	13	12	25	24	20	2	4	6	17
2007–08	New York Islanders	NHL	76	21	28	49	87	—	—	—	—	—
2008–09	New York Islanders	NHL	41	7	13	20	26	—	—	—	—	—
2008–09	Ottawa Senators	NHL	22	3	4	7	6	—	—	—	—	—
2009–10	Edmonton Oilers	NHL	43	13	8	21	30	—	—	—	—	—
2010–11	Pittsburgh Penguins	NHL	21	1	5	6	18	—	—	—	—	—
NHL totals			589	168	197	365	443	32	4	6	10	27

=== International ===
Year	Team	Event	GP	G	A	Pts	PIM
2002	Canada	WC	7	1	2	3	10
2003	Canada	WC	9	3	2	5	6
2006	Canada	WC	9	3	1	4	10
Totals			25	7	5	12	26

== Awards and achievements ==
Award	Year
AJHL Rookie of the Year	1996–97
AJHL MVP	1997–98
AJHL champion	1997–98
All-CCHA Rookie Team	1998–99
CCHA Rookie of the Year	1998–99
AHCA West Second-Team All-American	1999–2000
IIHF World Championship gold medal	2003

== See also ==
- Notable families in the NHL

Awards and achievements
Preceded by Mark Eaton	CCHA Rookie of the Year; 1998–99	Succeeded by Chris Gobert
