= Bill Comrie =

Canadian businessman (born 1950)

- Born: June 29, 1948 (age 78); Winnipeg, Manitoba, Canada
- Known for: Founding The Brick
- Spouses: Theresa Comrie (m. 1971; died 1990) Roxanne Huisman (m. 1994)
- Children: 5, including Mike, Paul, and Eric
- Relatives: Hilary Duff (ex-daughter-in-law)

William H. Comrie (born June 29, 1948) is a Canadian businessman. He is the founder of The Brick, one of Canada's largest volume retailers of furniture, mattresses, appliances and home electronics.

== Early life ==
Comrie was born on June 29, 1948, in Winnipeg, Manitoba and grew up in Edmonton, Alberta.

He played junior hockey with the Moose Jaw Canucks, a Chicago Blackhawks farm team, and later the Edmonton Oil Kings, but retired from hockey in 1968 to enter into the family furniture business following the death of his father Herb, eventually turning down an invitation to a Blackhawks training camp.

== BC Lions Ownership ==
From September 23, 1992 to March 11, 1996, Comrie was owner of the BC Lions of the Canadian Football League. The Lions won the 1994 Grey Cup.

== Personal life ==
Comrie is the father of professional ice hockey players Mike, Paul, and Eric Comrie. He has a grandson named Luca through Mike's former marriage to Hilary Duff.
