= Bryan Marchment =

Canadian ice hockey player (1969–2022)

- Born: May 1, 1969 Scarborough, Ontario, Canada
- Died: July 6, 2022 (aged 53) Montreal, Quebec, Canada
- Height: 6 ft 2 in (188 cm)
- Weight: 213 lb (97 kg; 15 st 3 lb)
- Position: Defence
- Shot: Left
- Played for: Winnipeg Jets; Chicago Blackhawks; Hartford Whalers; Edmonton Oilers; Tampa Bay Lightning; San Jose Sharks; Colorado Avalanche; Toronto Maple Leafs; Calgary Flames
- NHL draft: 16th overall, 1987; Winnipeg Jets
- Playing career: 1989–2006

Bryan William Marchment (May 1, 1969 – July 6, 2022) was a Canadian professional ice hockey player who played as a defenceman in the National Hockey League for the Winnipeg Jets, Chicago Blackhawks, Hartford Whalers, Edmonton Oilers, Tampa Bay Lightning, San Jose Sharks, Colorado Avalanche, Toronto Maple Leafs, and Calgary Flames between 1989 and 2006. He worked as a scout for the Sharks at the NHL level and as a part-time coach in the Sharks organization following his playing career.

== Early life ==
Marchment was born in Scarborough, Ontario, on May 1, 1969. He played in the 1982 Quebec International Pee-Wee Hockey Tournament with a minor ice hockey team from Mississauga. He began his junior career by playing four seasons with the Belleville Bulls of the Ontario Hockey League (OHL) from 1985 to 1989. Marchment was a high-scoring defenceman, more noted for assists, including 51 assists in 56 games during the 1987–88 season. He was selected in the first round (16th overall) by the Winnipeg Jets in the 1987 NHL entry draft.

== Professional career ==
Marchment made his NHL debut for the Jets on March 29, 1989, against the Los Angeles Kings at Great Western Forum. Despite a promising future, he spent most of his Jets career in the American Hockey League with the Moncton Hawks. However, he did get some moments in a Jets jersey as well, playing 28 games in the 1990–91 NHL season. He was traded with Chris Norton to the Chicago Blackhawks on July 22, 1991, in exchange for Troy Murray and Warren Rychel.

Marchment enjoyed more playing time for the Blackhawks, scoring 15 points in the 1991–92 NHL season and 20 points in the next season. On November 2, 1993, Marchment was sent to the Hartford Whalers with Steve Larmer in a trade for Eric Weinrich and Patrick Poulin. Marchment only played 42 games for the Whalers before he was sent to the Edmonton Oilers on August 30, 1994, as compensation for Hartford signing Steven Rice.

After 3 seasons with the Oilers, it was during his fourth that Marchment was traded with Jason Bonsignore and Steve Kelly to the Tampa Bay Lightning for Roman Hamrlík and Paul Comrie on December 30, 1997. During the 1997 season, Marchment suffered a severe concussion and began convulsing on the rink. Marchment only managed to play 22 games for the Lightning until he was once again traded; on March 24, 1998, Marchment, along with David Shaw and a first round pick in the 1998 draft (David Legwand) were sent to the San Jose Sharks for Andrei Nazarov and a first round pick in the 1998 draft (Vincent Lecavalier).

It was with the Sharks that Marchment enjoyed more success, including a career-high 22 points in the 2001–02 NHL season, 20 of which were assists. After a four-and-a-half-year stay with the Sharks he was once again traded; on March 8, 2003, Marchment was traded to Colorado for two draft picks. He only played 14 regular-season games for Colorado and 7 playoff games. A free agent at the end of the season, Marchment signed a one-year deal with his hometown Toronto Maple Leafs on July 11, 2003. In the 2003–04 season Marchment played in 75 regular-season games, scoring just 4 points, and appeared in a further 13 playoff games.

Marchment sat out the 2004–05 NHL lockout-affected season, and was signed by the Calgary Flames as a free agent on October 11, 2005. After the 2005–06 season ended, he became a free agent. As of March 2008, Marchment was a scout and in charge of player development for the Sharks.

== Reputation as a player ==
Marchment was known as a physical, hard-nosed defenseman. He was suspended for deliberate attempts to injure other players numerous times throughout his playing career. He was suspended 13 times by the league in his first 12 NHL seasons, and his hits were blamed for injuries suffered by Mike Modano, Joe Nieuwendyk, Greg Adams, Mike Gartner, Kevin Dineen, Peter Zezel, Pavel Bure, Sami Salo, Magnus Arvedson, Paul Kariya, Wendel Clark, and Martin Ručinský. On February 3, 1995, while the Toronto Maple Leafs were visiting Marchment's Oilers, a hit by Marchment partially collapsed one of Gartner's lungs; the severely injured Gartner had to return to Toronto by train. Doug Weight attacked him in 2000 after Marchment applied a knee-on-knee hit to him.

== Personal life ==
Marchment and his wife Kim had two children: a son, Mason and a daughter, Logan. The family resided in Uxbridge, Ontario. Marchment's son, Mason, is an NHL player and signed as an undrafted free agent with the San Jose Sharks on July 1, 2026. Marchment's niece, Kennedy Marchment, currently plays for Montreal of the Professional Women's Hockey League and has played for HV71 in the Swedish Women's Hockey League and the Connecticut Whale of the Premier Hockey Federation.

Marchment died on July 6, 2022, in Montreal at the age of 53. He was in town with Sharks management preparing for the 2022 NHL entry draft. According to the coroner's report released in January 2023, he died of a massive stroke. Sharks general manager Mike Grier began the announcement of the Sharks' first-round draft pick the following night by eulogizing Marchment.

== Career statistics ==
			Regular season					Playoffs
Season	Team	League	GP	G	A	Pts	PIM	GP	G	A	Pts	PIM
1985–86	Belleville Bulls	OHL	57	5	15	20	225	21	0	7	7	83
1986–87	Belleville Bulls	OHL	52	6	38	44	238	6	0	4	4	17
1987–88	Belleville Bulls	OHL	56	7	51	58	200	6	1	3	4	19
1988–89	Belleville Bulls	OHL	43	14	36	50	198	5	0	1	1	12
1988–89	Winnipeg Jets	NHL	2	0	0	0	2	—	—	—	—	—
1989–90	Moncton Hawks	AHL	56	4	19	23	217	—	—	—	—	—
1989–90	Winnipeg Jets	NHL	7	0	2	2	28	—	—	—	—	—
1990–91	Moncton Hawks	AHL	33	2	11	13	101	—	—	—	—	—
1990–91	Winnipeg Jets	NHL	28	2	2	4	91	—	—	—	—	—
1991–92	Chicago Blackhawks	NHL	58	5	10	15	168	16	1	0	1	36
1992–93	Chicago Blackhawks	NHL	78	5	15	20	313	4	0	0	0	12
1993–94	Chicago Blackhawks	NHL	13	1	4	5	42	—	—	—	—	—
1993–94	Hartford Whalers	NHL	42	3	7	10	124	—	—	—	—	—
1994–95	Edmonton Oilers	NHL	40	1	5	6	184	—	—	—	—	—
1995–96	Edmonton Oilers	NHL	78	3	15	18	202	—	—	—	—	—
1996–97	Edmonton Oilers	NHL	71	3	13	16	132	3	0	0	0	4
1997–98	Edmonton Oilers	NHL	27	0	4	4	58	—	—	—	—	—
1997–98	Tampa Bay Lightning	NHL	22	2	4	6	43	—	—	—	—	—
1997–98	San Jose Sharks	NHL	12	0	3	3	43	6	0	0	0	10
1998–99	San Jose Sharks	NHL	59	2	6	8	101	6	0	0	0	4
1999–00	San Jose Sharks	NHL	49	0	4	4	72	11	2	1	3	12
2000–01	San Jose Sharks	NHL	75	7	11	18	204	5	0	1	1	2
2001–02	San Jose Sharks	NHL	72	2	20	22	178	12	1	1	2	10
2002–03	San Jose Sharks	NHL	67	2	9	11	108	—	—	—	—	—
2002–03	Colorado Avalanche	NHL	14	0	3	3	33	7	0	0	0	4
2003–04	Toronto Maple Leafs	NHL	75	1	3	4	106	13	0	0	0	8
2005–06	Calgary Flames	NHL	37	1	2	3	75	—	—	—	—	—
NHL totals			926	40	142	182	2,307	83	4	3	7	102

== See also ==
- List of NHL players with 2000 career penalty minutes

Awards and achievements
Preceded by Pat Elynuik	Winnipeg Jets first-round draft pick 1987	Succeeded by Teemu Selänne
