= Nick Stajduhar =

Canadian ice hockey player

- Born: December 6, 1974 (age 51) Kitchener, Ontario, Canada
- Height: 6 ft 0 in (183 cm)
- Weight: 207 lb (94 kg; 14 st 11 lb)
- Position: Defence
- Shot: Left
- Played for: London Knights; Cape Breton Oilers; Edmonton Oilers; Pensacola Ice Pilots; Fort Wayne Komets; Louisiana IceGators; Quebec Rafales; Hamilton Bulldogs; Cincinnati Mighty Ducks; Flint Generals; Memphis RiverKings; Houston Aeros; Idaho Steelheads
- National team: Canada
- NHL draft: 16th overall, 1993; Edmonton Oilers
- Playing career: 1990–2001

Nick Stajduhar (born December 6, 1974) is a Canadian former professional ice hockey defenceman. He was selected by the Edmonton Oilers in the first round of the 1993 NHL entry draft, 16th overall, a pick the Oilers received from the Los Angeles Kings in the Wayne Gretzky trade.

Stajduhar only played two games for Edmonton, largely bouncing around the minor leagues, including three years in the East Coast Hockey League with the Pensacola Ice Pilots, as well as even lower level play with the Memphis Riverkings of the Central Hockey League and the Flint Generals of the United Hockey League.

== Career ==
Stajduhar was a physical, offense-minded defenceman during his junior years (with the OHL's London Knights), however, his play went into a sharp decline following an off-season incident outside a nightclub in Edmonton during Stajduhar's spell with the Cape Breton Oilers. Stajduhar was sucker-punched in the back of the head, an injury that left him concussed and delayed his start the following season.

== Career statistics ==
=== Regular season and playoffs ===
			Regular season					Playoffs
Season	Team	League	GP	G	A	Pts	PIM	GP	G	A	Pts	PIM
1990–91	London Knights	OHL	66	3	12	15	39	7	0	0	0	2
1991–92	London Knights	OHL	66	6	15	21	62	10	1	4	5	10
1992–93	London Knights	OHL	49	15	46	61	58	12	4	11	15	10
1993–94	London Knights	OHL	52	34	52	86	58	5	0	2	2	8
1994–95	Cape Breton Oilers	AHL	54	12	26	38	55	—	—	—	—	—
1995–96	Canada	Intl	46	7	21	28	60	—	—	—	—	—
1995–96	Cape Breton Oilers	AHL	8	2	0	2	11	—	—	—	—	—
1995–96	Edmonton Oilers	NHL	2	0	0	0	4	—	—	—	—	—
1996–97	Pensacola Ice Pilots	ECHL	30	9	15	24	32	12	1	6	7	34
1996–97	Quebec Rafales	IHL	7	1	3	4	2	—	—	—	—	—
1996–97	Hamilton Bulldogs	AHL	11	1	2	3	2	—	—	—	—	—
1997–98	Pensacola Ice Pilots	ECHL	19	4	8	12	36	19	5	21	26	10
1997–98	Fort Wayne Komets	IHL	15	2	0	2	27	—	—	—	—	—
1997–98	Cincinnati Mighty Ducks	AHL	13	0	0	0	16	—	—	—	—	—
1998–99	Pensacola Ice Pilots	ECHL	33	7	18	25	66	—	—	—	—	—
1998–99	Louisiana IceGators	ECHL	30	5	18	23	26	5	1	1	2	10
1999–2000	Flint Generals	UHL	67	22	49	71	106	15	5	21	26	24
2000–01	Memphis RiverKings	CHL	36	9	45	54	104	—	—	—	—	—
2000–01	Idaho Steelheads	WCHL	7	0	7	7	14	12	0	6	6	8
2000–01	Houston Aeros	IHL	22	0	0	0	16	—	—	—	—	—
AHL totals			86	15	28	43	84	—	—	—	—	—
NHL totals			2	0	0	0	4	—	—	—	—	—
ECHL totals			112	25	59	84	160	36	7	28	35	54

=== International ===
Year	Team	Event	GP	G	A	Pts	PIM
1994	Canada	WJC	7	1	4	5	8

Preceded by Jason Arnott	Edmonton Oilers first-round draft pick 1993 (second of two)	Succeeded by Jason Bonsignore
