= John Volken =

German-Canadian businessman

- Born: December 18, 1941 (age 84)
- Occupations: Businessman, Philanthropist
- Organization: The John Volken Foundation

John Volken (born December 18, 1941) is a German-Canadian businessman and philanthropist. He was the former CEO of United Furniture Warehouse and current founder The John Volken Foundation, which funds several nonprofit enterprises, including John Volken Addiction Recovery Academy, PricePro, and Lift The Children.

== Early life ==
John Volken was born in 1941 in Potsdam, a city that soon thereafter became part of communist East Germany. His father, a medical doctor, died near the end of the Second World War when John was only three years old. Due to her poor health, John's mother was forced to put John in an orphanage for a short while. At 14, he went from East Germany to West Germany as a refugee and started working during the day and going to school at night.

== Immigration to Canada ==
In 1960, Volken immigrated to Canada with very little money, but much enthusiasm for his new life in his new country. He started out as a farm labourer, dishwasher, and construction worker. When he became comfortable with the English language, he turned to sales. After several moves during his restless years, managing and developing various businesses, Volken settled in Vancouver.

== Business entrepreneur ==
In 1981, he started United Furniture Warehouse and built it from one small store into one of the largest furniture retail chains in North America, with over 150 locations.

== Social entrepreneur ==
In 2004, having achieved financial success, Volken sold his furniture business to follow his heart and become a full time social entrepreneur. He transferred all the proceeds and assets of the business into charitable foundations in Canada and the US, at a combined value of over $150 million, with the sole purpose of helping those in need.

=== Lift the Children ===
At this time, Volken travelled to Africa with the goal of helping the continent's destitute children. After seeing first-hand the terrible plight of so many orphans, he formed Lift the Children, a registered charitable organization whose mission is to help the most destitute by providing them with food, housing, and education- with the ultimate goal that they become fully self-sufficient. Currently, Lift the Children sponsors over 70 orphanages.

=== John Volken Academy ===
Back home, Volken researched areas of social neglect where he could make a lasting difference in North America. The result was the founding of the John Volken Academy- a long term residential drug and alcohol addiction recovery program for young men and women. The program is free of charge to those who are committed to change their lives and helps students advance their education and develop the life-skills needed to stay sober and become contributing members of society. The academy currently has campuses in Arizona, Utah, and Washington.

== Awards ==
In 1995, Volken received the Canada's Pacific Region Entrepreneur of the year award from Ernst & Young for his achievements with United Furniture Warehouse In 2014 he was named as one of 25 immigrants of the year by Royal Bank of Canada (RBC) in partnership with Canadian Immigrant. John Volken received the Dalai Lama Humanitarian Award in 2015 for effectively changing lives.
