= Lastman =

Lastman is the surname of the following notable people:

- Dale Lastman (born 1957), Canadian legal scholar, son of Mel
- Mel Lastman (born 1933), Canadian businessman and politician
  - Mel Lastman Square in Toronto, Canada
- Nicolaes Lastman (1585–1625), Dutch painter
- Pieter Lastman (1583–1633), Dutch painter, brother of Nicolaes

== See also ==
- The Last Man (disambiguation)
