= Leon's =

Canadian furniture retailer

Leon's Furniture Ltd.
- Type: Public
- Traded as: TSX: LNF
- Industry: Home Furnishing Stores
- Founded: Welland, Ontario, Canada (1909)
- Founder: Ablan Leon
- Headquarters: Toronto, Ontario, Canada
- Key people: Mike Walsh, President/CEO; Constantine Pefanis, CFO; Lewis Leon, President, Leon's Division; Darci Walker, President, The Brick Division
- Revenue: CAD 2.24 Billion (2018)
- Number of employees: 2,864
- Subsidiaries: The Brick, Appliance Canada, Trans Global Service, Furniture.ca
- Website: leons.ca

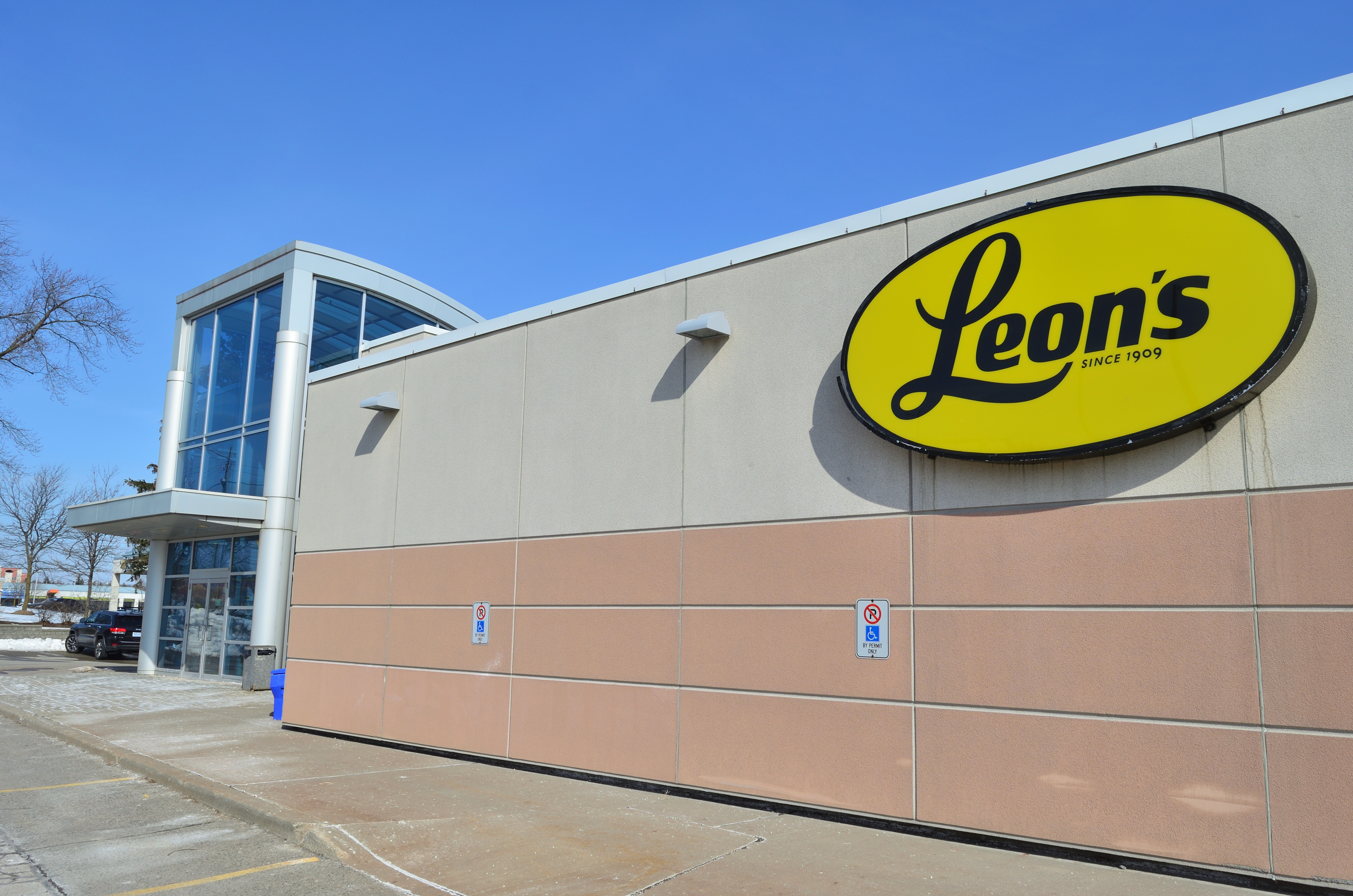
Leon's in Richmond Hill

Leon's Furniture Ltd. (TSX: LNF) (Meubles Léon Limité in Quebec) is a Canadian furniture retailer which first opened its store in 1909 in Welland, Ontario. The controlling interest in the company is owned by the Leon family, while some shares are traded publicly on the Toronto Stock Exchange. The company has stores in all provinces of Canada.

== History ==
Leon's originated in the city of Welland, Ontario, near the US border in the Niagara Region. It was founded by Ablan Leon, a Lebanese immigrant, who started out as a factory worker and then a door-to-door salesman. He was able to open a store with his profits in 1909. The original store (A. Leon Company at 244 King Street) was a dry goods outlet, which subsequently converted to furniture sales.

Leon's original store was staffed primarily by his family. When he died in 1942, he left the company to his children. After expanding the original location, they built new stores in Southwestern Ontario.

The company moved into the Toronto area in the subsequent decades, purchasing several established outlets in the city and converting them to Leon's name. The company went public in 1969 and opened its first warehouse showroom in 1973, touting it as the only one in Canada.

Today, roughly half of the store's more than 50 outlets are owned corporately, while the remainder, mainly in rural areas or in cities with lower populations, are owned by franchisees. The chain also operated two stores in Arizona, opening in 1980 and 1990 and closing in 1997 as the chain concentrated on Canada.

On November 11, 2012, Leon's announced plans to acquire competing furniture chain The Brick for $700 million.

Leon's took over eight Sears Home locations in 2016, a move that allowed Leon's to open its first store in the province of BC.

== Products ==
Leon's Furniture markets mid-range furniture, appliances and electronics; some items are discount, and some stores contain high-end showrooms with higher-priced items available. A major part of Leon's marketing strategy is its financing plans, which allow customers to defer payments for various lengths of time (the most common of which are 6 and 18-month terms). This financing is offered through Flexiti Financial.

In an effort to attract customers living in condos or smaller dwellings, Leon's launched their Urban Living Collection in June 2007, comprising smaller sized sofas, bedrooms and dining sets.

== Personnel ==
The staff of Leon's Furniture is separated into numerous departments in many of its corporate locations (franchise operating procedures tend to vary). Employees receive a number of benefits, including profit sharing and other benefits packages for full-time staff.

== Slogans ==
- "All the savings you can carry" — mid-late 1970s
- "It's a better way to buy furniture" — 1992
- "Canada's Only Furniture Superstore" — 2000
- "Leon's — Where Big Is Beautiful — In So Many Ways" — 2000–2004
- "Leon's — It's All About Trust" — 2004–2016
- "Leon's — Part of the Family" — 2016–Present

== Charities ==
Leon's celebrated its 100th anniversary with a donation to Boys & Girls Clubs of Canada. Leon's has also supported organizations such as Canadian Cancer Society, Salvation Army, Cerebral Palsy Association and YWCA, among others.
