= Steve Kelly =

Canadian ice hockey player (born 1976)

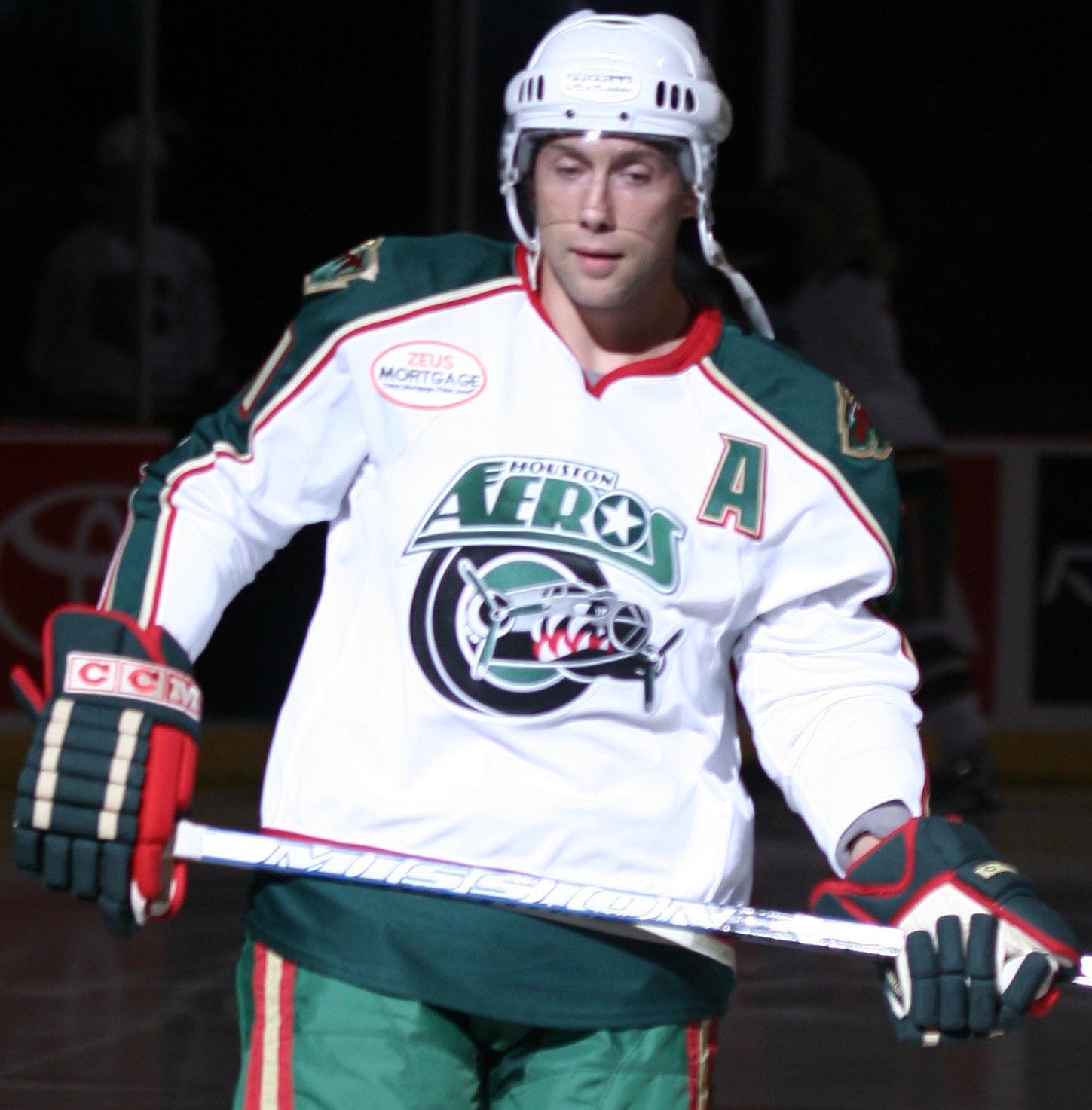
- Kelly with the Houston Aeros in 2007
- Born: October 26, 1976 (age 49) Vancouver, British Columbia, Canada
- Height: 6 ft 2 in (188 cm)
- Weight: 210 lb (95 kg; 15 st 0 lb)
- Position: Centre
- Shot: Left
- Played for: Edmonton Oilers; Tampa Bay Lightning; New Jersey Devils; Los Angeles Kings; Adler Mannheim; Frankfurt Lions; Minnesota Wild; HDD Olimpija Ljubljana
- NHL draft: 6th overall, 1995; Edmonton Oilers
- Playing career: 1996–2009

Steve Kelly (born October 26, 1976) is a Canadian former professional ice hockey center who played in the National Hockey League (NHL) with the Edmonton Oilers, Tampa Bay Lightning, New Jersey Devils, Los Angeles Kings and the Minnesota Wild.

== Playing career ==
Kelly played his junior hockey with the Prince Albert Raiders of the Western Hockey League (WHL), where he compiled 254 points in 268 games. In 1995–96, Kelly tallied 101 points and 203 penalty minutes to lead the Raiders to a 47-win season and second place in the WHL Eastern Division. Kelly was then drafted in the first round, sixth overall, of the 1995 NHL entry draft by the Edmonton Oilers.

Despite his high draft status, Kelly has never appeared in more than 43 games in an NHL season and has just 21 points in 147 games. Kelly played just 27 games for the Edmonton Oilers during the 1996–97 and 1997–98 seasons before being traded in February 1998 to the Tampa Bay Lightning along with Bryan Marchment and Jason Bonsignore in exchange for Roman Hamrlík and Paul Comrie.

After 58 games over two seasons with the Lightning, Kelly was sent to the New Jersey Devils prior to the 1999–2000 season, where he spent the majority of the season with their American Hockey League (AHL) affiliate, the Albany River Rats. Kelly notched 57 points for Albany, but made just one appearance with the Devils. However, injuries during the Devils' playoff run forced Kelly into the NHL lineup, where he appeared in 10 games during the Devils' Stanley Cup-winning drive. In February 2001, after 25 games in New Jersey, Kelly was traded to the Los Angeles Kings for forward Bob Corkum. With L.A.'s AHL affiliate, the Manchester Monarchs, Kelly enjoyed his best statistical seasons as a pro, amassing 133 points in just 113 games from 2002–2004, and represented the Canadian All-Stars in the 2004 AHL All-Star Classic.

Following the 2003–04 season, Kelly signed in Germany's Deutsche Eishockey Liga (DEL) with Adler Mannheim. In November 2005, Kelly signed with the Frankfurt Lions of the same league, where he scored 20 points in 22 games. In 2007, he signed with the Minnesota Wild and spent much of the season with the team's AHL affiliate, the Houston Aeros, before being called up at the end of the season to fill in at center. After being signed by the Columbus Blue Jackets and sent down to their affiliate the Syracuse Crunch, Kelly chose to return to Europe by signing a one-year contract with HDD Olimpija Ljubljana in Erste Bank Eishockey Liga. However, after posting 3 points in only his second game in the 2009–10 season, Kelly suffered a season-ending injury and decided to terminate his contract and retire from professional hockey in order to return to Canada.

While showing promise at the beginning of his pro career, Kelly is often regarded as a draft bust during his NHL career. Many fans and media expected the Oilers to draft Shane Doan (an obvious choice who was drafted next by Winnipeg, and later become the captain of the Jets/Coyotes franchise), or Jarome Iginla (an Edmonton native and junior teammate of Doan's), but Edmonton drafted Kelly sixth overall instead.

== Personal life ==
After retiring, Kelly joined the Calgary Police Service as a police officer.

== Career statistics ==
			Regular season					Playoffs
Season	Team	League	GP	G	A	Pts	PIM	GP	G	A	Pts	PIM
1992–93	Prince Albert Raiders	WHL	65	11	9	20	75	—	—	—	—	—
1993–94	Prince Albert Raiders	WHL	65	19	42	61	106	—	—	—	—	—
1994–95	Prince Albert Raiders	WHL	68	31	41	72	153	15	7	9	16	35
1995–96	Prince Albert Raiders	WHL	70	27	74	101	203	18	13	18	31	47
1996–97	Hamilton Bulldogs	AHL	48	9	29	38	111	11	3	3	6	24
1996–97	Edmonton Oilers	NHL	8	1	0	1	6	6	0	0	0	2
1997–98	Milwaukee Admirals	IHL	5	0	1	1	6	—	—	—	—	—
1997–98	Hamilton Bulldogs	AHL	11	2	8	10	18	—	—	—	—	—
1997–98	Edmonton Oilers	NHL	19	0	2	2	8	—	—	—	—	—
1997–98	Cleveland Lumberjacks	IHL	5	1	1	2	29	1	0	1	1	0
1997–98	Tampa Bay Lightning	NHL	24	2	1	3	15	—	—	—	—	—
1998–99	Cleveland Lumberjacks	IHL	18	6	7	13	36	—	—	—	—	—
1998–99	Tampa Bay Lightning	NHL	34	1	3	4	27	—	—	—	—	—
1999–00	Detroit Vipers	IHL	1	0	0	0	4	—	—	—	—	—
1999–2000	Albany River Rats	AHL	76	21	36	57	131	3	1	1	2	2
1999–2000	New Jersey Devils	NHL	1	0	0	0	0	10	0	0	0	4
2000–01	New Jersey Devils	NHL	24	2	2	4	21	—	—	—	—	—
2000–01	Los Angeles Kings	NHL	11	1	0	1	4	8	0	0	0	2
2001–02	Manchester Monarchs	AHL	49	10	21	31	88	5	1	8	9	4
2001–02	Los Angeles Kings	NHL	8	0	1	1	2	1	0	0	0	0
2002–03	Manchester Monarchs	AHL	54	19	44	63	144	3	0	1	1	0
2002–03	Los Angeles Kings	NHL	15	2	3	5	0	—	—	—	—	—
2003–04	Manchester Monarchs	AHL	59	21	49	70	117	1	0	0	0	2
2003–04	Los Angeles Kings	NHL	3	0	0	0	0	—	—	—	—	—
2004–05	Adler Mannheim	DEL	46	11	22	33	210	12	1	4	5	72
2005–06	Adler Mannheim	DEL	19	4	17	21	44	—	—	—	—	—
2005–06	Frankfurt Lions	DEL	22	6	14	20	119	—	—	—	—	—
2006–07	Frankfurt Lions	DEL	47	9	29	38	209	8	2	8	10	30
2007–08	Houston Aeros	AHL	48	10	18	28	81	3	0	0	0	6
2007–08	Minnesota Wild	NHL	2	0	0	0	0	—	—	—	—	—
2008–09	Syracuse Crunch	AHL	45	10	12	22	74	—	—	—	—	—
2009–10	HDD Olimpija Ljubljana	EBEL	2	1	2	3	2	—	—	—	—	—
AHL totals			390	102	217	319	764	26	5	13	18	38
NHL totals			149	9	12	21	83	25	0	0	0	8
DEL totals			134	30	82	112	582	20	3	12	15	102

Awards and achievements
Preceded by Jason Bonsignore	Edmonton Oilers first-round draft pick 1995	Succeeded by Boyd Devereaux
