= The Brick =

Canadian furniture retailer

The Brick Ltd.

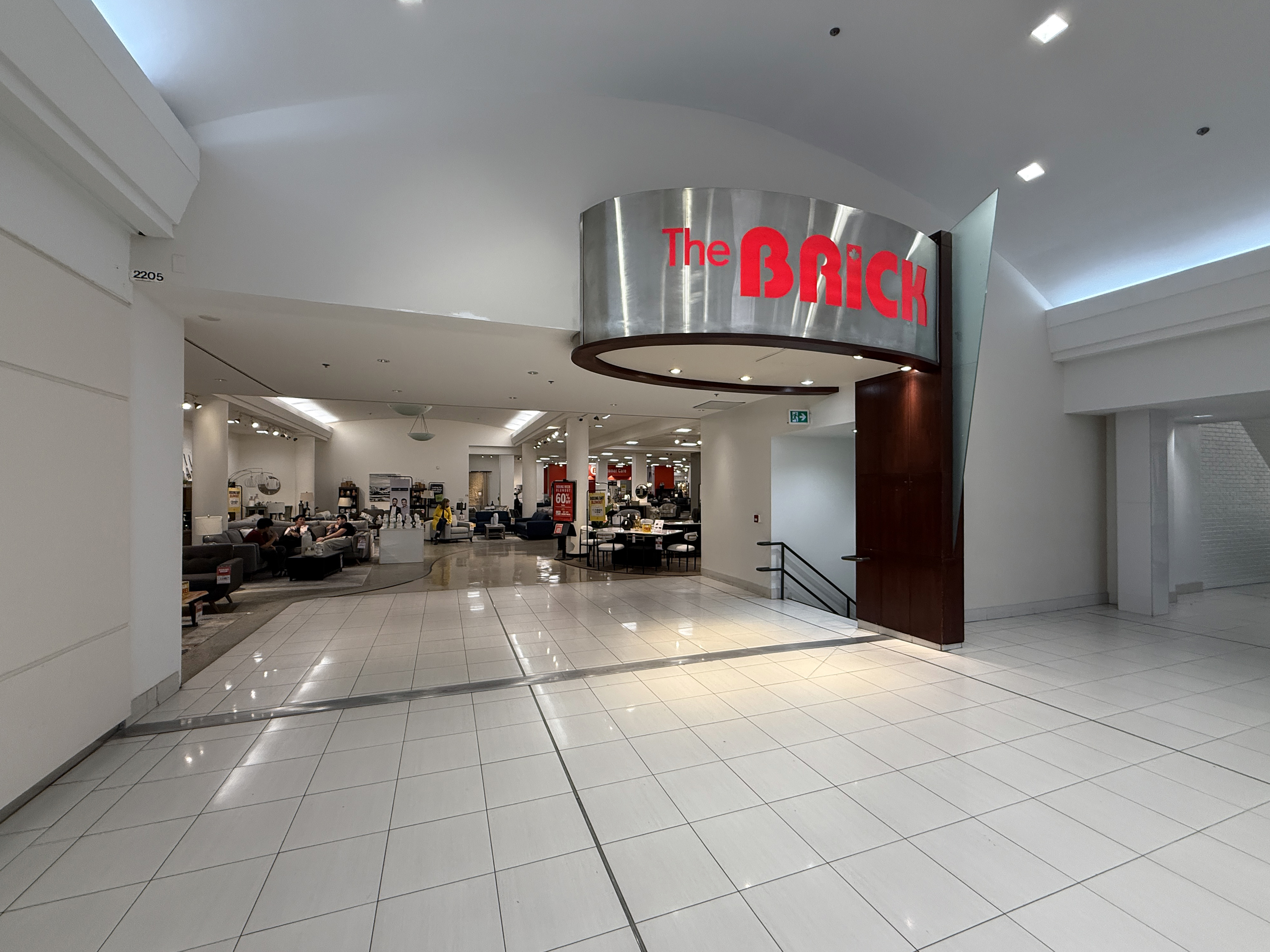
- Type: Subsidiary
- Industry: Retail
- Founded: 1971
- Founder: Bill Comrie
- Headquarters: Edmonton, Alberta, Canada
- Number of locations: 235
- Key people: Darci Walker (President)
- Products: Furniture
- Revenue: ▼$1.3 billion (2012)
- Net income: ▼$33.9 million (2012)
- Total assets: ▼$728 million (2012)
- Total equity: ▲$117 million (2012)
- Parent: Leon's (2012–present)
- Website: thebrick.com

The Brick Ltd. is a Canadian retailer of furniture, mattresses, appliances and home electronics. The company was founded as The Brick Warehouse LP by brothers, John, Fred, and Bill Comrie. The first warehouse opened on September 1, 1971 in Edmonton, Alberta. Its first expansion was to Fort McMurray, Alberta in the 1970s and later acquired a competitor in the city of Calgary.

The Brick has expanded across Canada and operates 220 retail stores (including 20 franchise locations) in every province and territory except for Nunavut, while Quebec stores are branded simply as Brick. In addition, the Brick Group Income Fund operates distribution centres in Calgary, Edmonton, Vancouver, Winnipeg, Toronto, Montreal and Dartmouth.

== History ==
The company was founded as The Brick Warehouse LP by brothers, John, Fred, and Bill Comrie. The first warehouse opened on September 1, 1971 in Edmonton, Alberta. Its first expansion was to Fort McMurray, Alberta in the 1970s and later acquired a competitor in the city of Calgary. In 1975 it acquired the Bad Boy Furniture chain of 40 stores in Toronto, Ontario area. Absorbed into The Brick, the rights to the Bad Boy Furniture name was lapsed and later revived by Lastman family in 1991.

In March 2004, the company acquired United Furniture Warehouse which had 81 locations throughout Canada at the time. In 2006, 24 stores were rebranded as "The Brick" in a strategic attempt to save on advertising costs and increase sales.

On November 11, 2012, The Brick announced that competitor Leon's would acquire the company for CA$700 million (equivalent to $943 million in 2025), subject to approval of shareholders. Following the acquisition, Leon's maintains the two separate chains.

In November 2012, The Brick agreed to pay $2.1 million (equivalent to $2.8 million in 2025) to settle a class-action lawsuit filed by consumer rights group Option consommateurs in 2009 over claims the retailer's advertising was misleading.

In July 2017, The Brick re-branded all of its United Furniture Warehouse and The Brick Clearance Centres into a new branding called The Brick Outlet.

== Other ==
In the 1980s, they were financial backers of the Edmonton Brick Men soccer team, which was owned by Edmonton Oilers owner Peter Pocklington, with the team being named after the company and the team's logo using the same font for the word Brick as the furniture retailer, being ITC Bauhaus.
