= 1997–98 Philadelphia Flyers season =

NHL hockey team season

1997–98 Philadelphia Flyers
- Division: 2nd Atlantic
- Conference: 3rd Eastern
- 1997–98 record: 42–29–11
- Home record: 24–11–6
- Road record: 18–18–5
- Goals for: 242
- Goals against: 193

Team information
- General manager: Bob Clarke
- Coach: Wayne Cashman (Oct.–Mar.); Roger Neilson (Mar.–Apr.)
- Captain: Eric Lindros
- Alternate captains: Rod Brind'Amour; Eric Desjardins
- Arena: CoreStates Center
- Average attendance: 19,519
- Minor league affiliate: Philadelphia Phantoms

Team leaders
- Goals: John LeClair (51)
- Assists: Eric Lindros (41)
- Points: John LeClair (89)
- Penalty minutes: Dan Kordic (210)
- Plus/minus: John LeClair (+30)
- Wins: Ron Hextall (21)
- Goals against average: Ron Hextall (2.17)

The 1997–98 Philadelphia Flyers season was the franchise's 31st season in the National Hockey League (NHL). The Flyers lost their quarterfinal series with the Buffalo Sabres in five games.

== Off-season ==
Less than a week after losing game four of the Stanley Cup Final, head coach Terry Murray was fired. San Jose Sharks assistant coach Wayne Cashman was named his replacement on July 7, 1997.

The Flyers made two major acquisitions during the summer. On July 14, unrestricted free agent defenseman Luke Richardson, formerly of the Edmonton Oilers, signed a five-year, $12.6 million contract. A month later the Flyers signed Group II restricted free agent centerman Chris Gratton of the Tampa Bay Lightning to a five-year, $16.5 million offer sheet which included a $9 million signing bonus. However, Tampa Bay claimed they had traded Gratton to the Chicago Blackhawks before the Flyers had signed Gratton. An arbitrator dismissed this and another claim that the offer sheet was illegible because the contract figures were smeared. Fearing Tampa Bay would match, the Flyers agreed to send defenseman Karl Dykhuis and right winger Mikael Renberg to the Lightning in exchange for the four first-round picks Tampa Bay would receive if they did not match.

34-year-old forward Dale Hawerchuk announced his retirement on August 25, 1997, due to a degenerative left hip.

== Regular season ==
With the acquisitions of Gratton and Richardson, the Flyers were expected to make another Stanley Cup run. A 7–3–1 start came crashing down as the Devils posted a 5–0 road win on October 27. Although the club finished the calendar year with an 8–0 strafing of Vancouver on New Year's Eve and began 1998 with a 7–2 road win over Ottawa, there were signs of trouble for Wayne Cashman's team - notably bad shutout home losses to San Jose in November and Boston in early December.

In a move which shocked many in Philadelphia and around the NHL, Cashman was reassigned as assistant coach and Roger Neilson elevated to head coach following a 4–3 overtime victory against Pittsburgh on March 8.

The decision didn't seem to pay off, and after a 5–4 overtime win over the New York Rangers on March 22, the team limped to a 6–8–0 finish, including back-to-back 2–1 losses to the Rangers and Bruins to end the year.

On April 13 in a nationally televised 2–1 loss in Buffalo, John LeClair scored his 50th goal of the season, becoming the first American-born player to score 50 goals in three straight seasons.

=== Season standings ===
Atlantic Division
No.	CR		GP	W	L	T	GF	GA	Pts
1	1	**New Jersey Devils**	82	48	23	11	225	166	107
2	3	**Philadelphia Flyers**	82	42	29	11	242	193	95
3	4	**Washington Capitals**	82	40	30	12	219	202	92
4	10	New York Islanders	82	30	41	11	212	225	71
5	11	New York Rangers	82	25	39	18	197	231	68
6	12	Florida Panthers	82	24	43	15	203	256	63
7	13	Tampa Bay Lightning	82	17	55	10	151	269	44

Eastern Conference
R		Div	GP	W	L	T	GF	GA	Pts
**1**	**New Jersey Devils**	**ATL**	**82**	**48**	**23**	**11**	**225**	**166**	**107**
**2**	**Pittsburgh Penguins**	**NE**	**82**	**40**	**24**	**18**	**228**	**188**	**98**
**3**	**Philadelphia Flyers**	**ATL**	**82**	**42**	**29**	**11**	**242**	**193**	**95**
**4**	**Washington Capitals**	**ATL**	**82**	**40**	**30**	**12**	**219**	**202**	**92**
**5**	**Boston Bruins**	**NE**	**82**	**39**	**30**	**13**	**221**	**194**	**91**
**6**	**Buffalo Sabres**	**NE**	**82**	**36**	**29**	**17**	**211**	**187**	**89**
**7**	**Montreal Canadiens**	**NE**	**82**	**37**	**32**	**13**	**235**	**208**	**87**
**8**	**Ottawa Senators**	**NE**	**82**	**34**	**33**	**15**	**193**	**200**	**83**
9	Carolina Hurricanes	NE	82	33	41	8	200	219	74
10	New York Islanders	ATL	82	30	41	11	212	225	71
11	New York Rangers	ATL	82	25	39	18	197	231	68
12	Florida Panthers	ATL	82	24	43	15	203	256	63
13	Tampa Bay Lightning	ATL	82	17	55	10	151	269	44

Divisions: ATL – Atlantic, NE – Northeast

bold – Qualified for playoffs

== Playoffs ==
In a season in which the Flyers – despite a hard fall to the Detroit Red Wings the previous year – were heavily favored to repeat as Eastern champs and return to the Final, they never came close, as they were dominated in the first round by the Buffalo Sabres in five games.

== Schedule and results ==
=== Regular season ===
1997–98 regular season
October: 7–5–2, 16 points (home: 5–3–0; road: 2–2–2)

Game	Date	Score	Opponent	Decision	Record	Points	Recap
1	October 1	3–1	Florida Panthers	Hextall	1–0–0	2	W
2	October 3	5–3	Ottawa Senators	Hextall	2–0–0	4	W
3	October 5	1–2	Phoenix Coyotes	Snow	2–1–0	4	L
4	October 8	1–4	@ New Jersey Devils	Snow	2–2–0	4	L
5	October 9	3–1	Pittsburgh Penguins	Hextall	3–2–0	6	W
6	October 11	6–2	@ Montreal Canadiens	Hextall	4–2–0	8	W
7	October 13	3–2 OT	@ San Jose Sharks	Snow	5–2–0	10	W
8	October 15	2–2 OT	@ Mighty Ducks of Anaheim	Hextall	5–2–1	11	T
9	October 17	1–5	@ Los Angeles Kings	Snow	5–3–1	11	L
10	October 21	7–1	Tampa Bay Lightning	Hextall	6–3–1	13	W
11	October 23	4–3	Calgary Flames	Snow	7–3–1	15	W
12	October 27	0–5	New Jersey Devils	Hextall	7–4–1	15	L
13	October 29	2–3	St. Louis Blues	Snow	7–5–1	15	L
14	October 31	2–2 OT	@ Washington Capitals	Hextall	7–5–2	16	T

November: 8–3–2, 18 points (home: 4–2–1; road: 4–1–1)

Game	Date	Score	Opponent	Decision	Record	Points	Recap
15	November 2	3–3 OT	Dallas Stars	Hextall	7–5–3	17	T
16	November 3	5–1	@ St. Louis Blues	Snow	8–5–3	19	W
17	November 6	6–2	Edmonton Oilers	Snow	9–5–3	21	W
18	November 8	4–3	@ Ottawa Senators	Snow	10–5–3	23	W
19	November 11	1–0	Ottawa Senators	Hextall	11–5–3	25	W
20	November 13	1–2	Colorado Avalanche	Hextall	11–6–3	25	L
21	November 14	5–2	@ Florida Panthers	Snow	12–6–3	27	W
22	November 16	3–2	Tampa Bay Lightning	Hextall	13–6–3	29	W
23	November 19	1–3	@ Toronto Maple Leafs	Snow	13–7–3	29	L
24	November 20	0–3	San Jose Sharks	Hextall	13–8–3	29	L
25	November 26	3–1	@ Buffalo Sabres	Snow	14–8–3	31	W
26	November 28	4–1	New York Islanders	Hextall	15–8–3	33	W
27	November 29	3–3 OT	@ Tampa Bay Lightning	Snow	15–8–4	34	T

December: 8–2–3, 18 points (home: 4–1–2; road: 4–1–1)

Game	Date	Score	Opponent	Decision	Record	Points	Recap
28	December 1	1–1 OT	Buffalo Sabres	Snow	15–8–5	35	T
29	December 3	0–3	Boston Bruins	Snow	15–9–5	35	L
30	December 5	4–4 OT	@ New York Rangers	Snow	15–9–6	36	T
31	December 11	4–3	New York Islanders	Hextall	16–9–6	38	W
32	December 12	3–2	@ Chicago Blackhawks	Snow	17–9–6	40	W
33	December 14	3–0	Tampa Bay Lightning	Hextall	18–9–6	42	W
34	December 15	3–1	@ Montreal Canadiens	Snow	19–9–6	44	W
35	December 18	2–2 OT	Boston Bruins	Hextall	19–9–7	45	T
36	December 20	2–0	Florida Panthers	Snow	20–9–7	47	W
37	December 23	4–2	Carolina Hurricanes	Hextall	21–9–7	49	W
38	December 27	2–5	@ Calgary Flames	Hextall	21–10–7	49	L
39	December 30	3–1	@ Edmonton Oilers	Snow	22–10–7	51	W
40	December 31	8–0	@ Vancouver Canucks	Hextall	23–10–7	53	W

January: 5–5–2, 12 points (home: 2–2–1; road: 3–3–1)

Game	Date	Score	Opponent	Decision	Record	Points	Recap
41	January 3	7–2	@ Ottawa Senators	Snow	24–10–7	55	W
42	January 8	3–3 OT	@ Carolina Hurricanes	Hextall	24–10–8	56	T
43	January 9	1–4	@ Washington Capitals	Snow	24–11–8	56	L
44	January 11	5–2	@ Tampa Bay Lightning	Hextall	25–11–8	58	W
45	January 14	3–3 OT	Montreal Canadiens	Snow	25–11–9	59	T
46	January 20	3–0	Buffalo Sabres	Hextall	26–11–9	61	W
47	January 22	4–3	@ New York Rangers	Snow	27–11–9	63	W
48	January 24	0–1	@ Detroit Red Wings	Hextall	27–12–9	63	L
49	January 26	3–1	New York Islanders	Hextall	28–12–9	65	W
50	January 28	1–6	@ New York Islanders	Snow	28–13–9	65	L
51	January 29	2–3	Montreal Canadiens	Hextall	28–14–9	65	L
52	January 31	2–3 OT	Washington Capitals	Hextall	28–15–9	65	L

February: 2–2–0, 4 points (home: 0–0–0; road: 2–2–0)

Game	Date	Score	Opponent	Decision	Record	Points	Recap
53	February 4	0–1	@ Dallas Stars	Hextall	28–16–9	65	L
54	February 5	6–2	@ Phoenix Coyotes	Snow	29–16–9	67	W
55	February 7	2–3	@ Colorado Avalanche	Hextall	29–17–9	67	L
56	February 28	3–1	@ New York Rangers	Hextall	30–17–9	69	W

March: 8–7–2, 18 points (home: 7–1–2; road: 1–6–0)

Game	Date	Score	Opponent	Decision	Record	Points	Recap
57	March 2	3–4	@ New Jersey Devils	Hextall	30–18–9	69	L
58	March 3	1–3	@ New York Islanders	Snow	30–19–9	69	L
59	March 5	3–2	Washington Capitals	Hextall	31–19–9	71	W
60	March 7	4–6	@ Pittsburgh Penguins	Hextall	31–20–9	71	L
61	March 8	4–3 OT	Pittsburgh Penguins	Hextall	32–20–9	73	W
62	March 10	2–2 OT	New Jersey Devils	Hextall	32–20–10	74	T
63	March 12	3–2	Vancouver Canucks	Hextall	33–20–10	76	W
64	March 14	6–1	Detroit Red Wings	Hextall	34–20–10	78	W
65	March 16	4–1	Toronto Maple Leafs	Hextall	35–20–10	80	W
66	March 19	3–3 OT	Mighty Ducks of Anaheim	Hextall	35–20–11	81	T
67	March 21	3–4	@ Pittsburgh Penguins	Hextall	35–21–11	81	L
68	March 22	5–4 OT	New York Rangers	Burke	36–21–11	83	W
69	March 24	2–3	@ New Jersey Devils	Hextall	36–22–11	83	L
70	March 26	2–4	@ Boston Bruins	Burke	36–23–11	83	L
71	March 28	2–4	Carolina Hurricanes	Hextall	36–24–11	83	L
72	March 29	3–1	@ Carolina Hurricanes	Burke	37–24–11	85	W
73	March 31	3–2	Chicago Blackhawks	Burke	38–24–11	87	W

April: 4–5–0, 8 points (home: 2–2–0; road: 2–3–0)

Game	Date	Score	Opponent	Decision	Record	Points	Recap
74	April 2	3–0	Los Angeles Kings	Burke	39–24–11	89	W
75	April 4	1–4	Florida Panthers	Burke	39–25–11	89	L
76	April 8	6–1	@ Tampa Bay Lightning	Burke	40–25–11	91	W
77	April 9	2–3	@ Florida Panthers	Hextall	40–26–11	91	L
78	April 11	4–3	Washington Capitals	Burke	41–26–11	93	W
79	April 13	1–2	@ Buffalo Sabres	Hextall	41–27–11	93	L
80	April 16	7–3	@ Florida Panthers	Burke	42–27–11	95	W
81	April 18	1–2	New York Rangers	Hextall	42–28–11	95	L
82	April 19	1–2	@ Boston Bruins	Burke	42–29–11	95	L

Legend: W Win (2 points) L Loss (0 points) T Tie (1 point)

=== Playoffs ===
1998 Stanley Cup playoffs
Eastern Conference quarterfinals vs. Buffalo Sabres - Sabres win 4–1

Game	Date	Score	Opponent	Decision	Series	Recap
1	April 22	2–3	Buffalo Sabres	Burke	Sabres lead 1–0	L
2	April 24	3–2	Buffalo Sabres	Burke	Series tied 1–1	W
3	April 27	1–6	@ Buffalo Sabres	Burke	Sabres lead 2–1	L
4	April 29	1–4	@ Buffalo Sabres	Burke	Sabres lead 3–1	L
5	May 1	2–3 OT	Buffalo Sabres	Burke	Sabres win 4–1	L

Legend: W Win L Loss

== Player statistics ==
=== Scoring ===
- Position abbreviations: C = Center; D = Defense; G = Goaltender; LW = Left wing; RW = Right wing
- † = Joined team via a transaction (e.g., trade, waivers, signing) during the season. Stats reflect time with the Flyers only.
- ‡ = Left team via a transaction (e.g., trade, waivers, release) during the season. Stats reflect time with the Flyers only.

No.	Player	Pos	Regular season						Playoffs					
No.	Player	Pos	GP	G	A	Pts	+/-	PIM	GP	G	A	Pts	+/-	PIM
10	John LeClair	LW	82	51	36	87	30	32	5	1	1	2	−4	8
17	Rod Brind'Amour	LW	82	36	38	74	−2	54	5	2	2	4	2	7
88	Eric Lindros	C	63	30	41	71	14	134	5	1	2	3	−3	17
55	Chris Gratton	C	82	22	40	62	11	159	5	2	0	2	−1	10
20	Trent Klatt	RW	82	14	28	42	2	16	5	0	0	0	−6	0
44	Janne Niinimaa‡	D	66	3	31	34	6	56	—	—	—	—	—	—
9	Dainius Zubrus	RW	69	8	25	33	29	42	5	0	1	1	2	4
37	Eric Desjardins	D	77	6	27	33	11	36	5	0	1	1	−3	0
77	Paul Coffey	D	57	2	27	29	3	30	—	—	—	—	—	—
19	Alexandre Daigle†	RW	37	9	17	26	−1	6	5	0	2	2	0	0
25	Shjon Podein	RW	82	11	13	24	8	53	5	0	0	0	−1	10
11	Mike Sillinger†	C	27	11	11	22	3	16	3	1	0	1	1	0
12	Colin Forbes	LW	63	12	7	19	2	59	5	0	0	0	2	2
6	Chris Therien	D	78	3	16	19	5	80	5	0	1	1	−1	4
45	Vaclav Prospal‡	C	41	5	13	18	−10	17	—	—	—	—	—	—
23	Petr Svoboda	D	56	3	15	18	19	83	3	0	1	1	−1	4
15	Pat Falloon‡	RW	30	5	7	12	3	8	—	—	—	—	—	—
29	Joel Otto	C	68	3	4	7	−2	78	5	0	0	0	−1	0
3	Dan McGillis†	D	13	1	5	6	−4	35	5	1	2	3	0	10
22	Luke Richardson	D	81	2	3	5	7	139	5	0	0	0	−3	0
32	Daniel Lacroix	C	56	1	4	5	0	135	4	0	0	0	0	4
26	John Druce	RW	23	1	2	3	0	2	2	0	0	0	−1	2
28	Kjell Samuelsson	D	49	0	3	3	9	28	1	0	0	0	1	0
21	Dan Kordic	LW	61	1	1	2	−4	210	—	—	—	—	—	—
14	Craig Darby	C	3	1	0	1	0	0	—	—	—	—	—	—
24	Chris Joseph	D	15	1	0	1	1	0	1	0	0	0	0	2
44	Dave Babych†	D	6	0	0	0	2	12	5	1	0	1	2	4
33	Sean Burke†	G	11	0	0	0		0	5	0	0	0		0
38	Paul Healey	RW	4	0	0	0	0	12	—	—	—	—	—	—
27	Ron Hextall	G	46	0	0	0		10	1	0	0	0		0
18	Brantt Myhres†‡	RW	23	0	0	0	−1	169	—	—	—	—	—	—
30	Garth Snow‡	G	29	0	0	0		18	—	—	—	—	—	—

=== Goaltending ===
- † = Joined team via a transaction (e.g., trade, waivers, signing) during the season. Stats reflect time with the Flyers only.
- ‡ = Left team via a transaction (e.g., trade, waivers, release) during the season. Stats reflect time with the Flyers only.

No.	Player	Regular season											Playoffs									
No.	Player	GP	GS	W	L	T	SA	GA	GAA	SV%	SO	TOI	GP	GS	W	L	SA	GA	GAA	SV%	SO	TOI
27	Ron Hextall	46	44	21	17	7	1089	97	2.17	.911	4	2,688	1	0	0	0	8	1	3.00	.875	0	20
30	Garth Snow‡	29	27	14	9	4	682	67	2.44	.902	1	1,651	—	—	—	—	—	—	—	—	—	—
33	Sean Burke†	11	11	7	3	0	311	27	2.56	.913	1	632	5	5	1	4	121	17	3.60	.860	0	283

== Awards and records ==
=== Awards ===
Type	Award/honor	Recipient	Ref
League (annual)	NHL first All-Star team	John LeClair (Left wing)	
League (in-season)	NHL All-Star Game selection	John LeClair (Note: LeClair and Lindros were voted to the starting lineup.)	
League (in-season)	NHL All-Star Game selection	Eric Lindros	
League (in-season)	NHL Player of the Week	John LeClair (November 10)	
Team	Barry Ashbee Trophy	Eric Desjardins	
Team	Bobby Clarke Trophy	John LeClair	
Team	Class Guy Award	Trent Klatt	
Team	Pelle Lindbergh Memorial Trophy	Colin Forbes	

=== Records ===
Among the team records set during the 1997–98 season was John LeClair tying the team record for most points in a single period (4) on October 11.

== Transactions ==
The Flyers were involved in the following transactions from June 8, 1997, the day after the deciding game of the 1997 Stanley Cup Final, through June 16, 1998, the day of the deciding game of the 1998 Stanley Cup Final.

=== Trades ===
Date	Details		Ref
June 18, 1997	To Philadelphia Flyers: Rights to Martin Cerven	To Edmonton Oilers: 7th-round pick in 1997	
June 21, 1997	To Philadelphia Flyers: 2nd-round pick in 1998	To Dallas Stars: 3rd-round pick in 1997	
August 20, 1997	To Philadelphia Flyers: Philadelphia's 1st-round pick in 1998; Philadelphia's 1st-round pick in 1999; Philadelphia's 1st-round pick in 2000; Philadelphia's 1st-round pick in 2001	To Tampa Bay Lightning: Karl Dykhuis; Mikael Renberg	
October 15, 1997	To Philadelphia Flyers: Rights to Brantt Myhres	To Edmonton Oilers: Jason Bowen	
October 21, 1997	To Philadelphia Flyers: Mike Maneluk	To Ottawa Senators: Future considerations	
January 17, 1998	To Philadelphia Flyers: Alexandre Daigle	To Ottawa Senators: Pat Falloon; Vaclav Prospal; 2nd-round pick in 1998	
February 5, 1998	To Philadelphia Flyers: Mike Sillinger	To Vancouver Canucks: Conditional 6th-round pick in 1998 (Note: The conditional draft pick was traded back to the Flyers on March 24.)	
March 4, 1998	To Philadelphia Flyers: Sean Burke	To Vancouver Canucks: Garth Snow	
March 9, 1998 (Note: The Blues received the draft pick as compensation for the Flyers hiring Neilson as head coach. Neilson was serving as an assistant coach for the Blues.)	To Philadelphia Flyers: Roger Neilson	To St. Louis Blues: Conditional 6th-round pick in 1999	
March 24, 1998	To Philadelphia Flyers: Dave Babych; Philadelphia's 6th-round pick in 1998	To Vancouver Canucks: 3rd-round pick in 1998	
March 24, 1998	To Philadelphia Flyers: Dan McGillis; 2nd-round pick in 1998	To Edmonton Oilers: Janne Niinimaa	

=== Players acquired ===
Date	Player	Former team	Term	Via	Ref
June 12, 1997	Jim Montgomery	Kolner Haie (DEL)	3-year	Free agency	
July 10, 1997	Jamie Heward	Toronto Maple Leafs	1-year	Free agency	
July 14, 1997	Luke Richardson	Edmonton Oilers	5-year	Free agency	
July 16, 1997	Travis Van Tighem	Michigan Tech University (WCHA)	1-year	Free agency	
August 12, 1997	Chris Gratton	Tampa Bay Lightning	5-year	Free agency	
September 4, 1997	Chris Joseph	Vancouver Canucks	1-year (Note: Option for second year)	Free agency	
May 18, 1998	Ryan Bast	Saint John Flames (AHL)	2-year	Free agency	

=== Players lost ===
Date	Player	New team	Via (Note: In parentheses is the player's free agency group on July 1 if applicable.)	Ref
August 25, 1997	Dale Hawerchuk		Retirement	
N/A	Patrik Juhlin	Jokerit (Liiga)	Free agency (II)	
N/A	Frantisek Kucera	HC Sparta Praha (ELH)	Free agency	
N/A	Darren Rumble	Adler Mannheim (DEL)	Free agency (UFA)	
September 28, 1997	Scott Daniels	New Jersey Devils	Waiver draft	
October 1997	Ryan Sittler	South Carolina Stingrays (ECHL)	Free agency	
October 29, 1997	Michel Petit	Detroit Vipers (IHL)	Free agency (III)	
April 14, 1998	Brantt Myhres		Release	

=== Signings ===
Date	Player	Term	Contract type	Ref
June 18, 1997	Kjell Samuelsson	1-year	Re-signing	
July 9, 1997	Jean-Marc Pelletier		Entry-level	
July 10, 1997	Martin Cerven	3-year	Entry-level	
July 15, 1997	Craig Darby	2-year	Re-signing	
July 15, 1997	Neil Little	1-year	Re-signing	
July 18, 1997	Brett Bruininks	1-year	Re-signing	
August 18, 1997	Garth Snow	1-year	Arbitration award	
September 3, 1997	Dan Kordic	2-year	Re-signing	
September 12, 1997	Chris Therien	3-year	Re-signing	
October 16, 1997	Brantt Myhres	1-year	Re-signing	
October 17, 1997	John LeClair	3-year (Note: Replaced remaining 3 years on previous contract)	Re-signing	
December 17, 1997	Eric Lindros	1-year	Re-signing	

== Draft picks ==
Philadelphia's picks at the 1997 NHL entry draft, which was held at the Civic Arena in Pittsburgh, Pennsylvania on June 21, 1997. The Flyers traded their third-round pick, 77th overall, to the Dallas Stars for the Stars' 1998 second-round pick on June 21, 1997. They also traded their fifth-round pick, 130th overall, and Bob Wilkie to the Chicago Blackhawks for Karl Dykhuis on February 16, 1995, and their seventh-round pick, 187th overall, to the Edmonton Oilers for Martin Cerven on June 18, 1997.

Round	Pick	Player	Position	Nationality	Team (league)	Notes
2	30	Jean-Marc Pelletier	Goaltender	United States	Cornell University (ECAC)	(Note: The Flyers acquired the Toronto Maple Leafs' second-round pick, 30th overall, the Los Angeles Kings' 1996 first-round pick, and the Kings' 1996 fourth-round pick from the Toronto Maple Leafs for Dmitri Yushkevich and the Flyers' 1996 second-round pick on August 30, 1995.)
2	50	Pat Kavanagh	Right wing	Canada	Peterborough Petes (OHL)	
3	62	Kris Mallette	Defense	Canada	Kelowna Rockets (WHL)	(Note: The Flyers traded their first-round pick, 23rd overall, the Hartford Whalers' seventh-round pick, 169th overall, and Kevin Haller to the Hartford Whalers for Paul Coffey and the Whalers' third-round pick, 62nd overall, on December 15, 1996.)
4	103	Mikhail Chernov	Defense	Russia	Torpedo Yaroslavl (RUS)	
6	158	Jordon Flodell	Defense	Canada	Moose Jaw Warriors (WHL)	
7	164	Todd Fedoruk	Left wing	Canada	Kelowna Rockets (WHL)	(Note: The Flyers traded their 1996 fourth-round pick to the Los Angeles Kings for John Druce and the Kings' seventh-round pick, 164th overall, on March 19, 1996.)
8	214	Marko Kauppinen	Defense	Finland	JYP Jr. (FIN)	
9	240	Par Styf	Defense	Sweden	Modo Hockey Jrs. (SWE)	

== Farm teams ==
The Flyers were affiliated with the Philadelphia Phantoms of the AHL.
