= 1997–98 New York Islanders season =

NHL hockey team season

1997–98 New York Islanders
- Division: 4th Atlantic
- Conference: 10th Eastern
- 1997–98 record: 30–41–11
- Home record: 17–20–4
- Road record: 13–21–7
- Goals for: 212
- Goals against: 225

Team information
- General manager: Mike Milbury
- Coach: Rick Bowness (Oct.–Mar.); Mike Milbury (Mar.–Apr.)
- Captain: Bryan McCabe (Oct.–Feb.); Trevor Linden (Feb.–Apr.)
- Arena: Nassau Coliseum
- Average attendance: 12,253
- Minor league affiliates: Utah Grizzlies; Kentucky Thoroughblades; Louisville RiverFrogs

Team leaders
- Goals: Zigmund Palffy (45)
- Assists: Zigmund Palffy (42)
- Points: Zigmund Palffy (87)
- Penalty minutes: Rich Pilon (297)
- Plus/minus: Mariusz Czerkawski (+11)
- Wins: Tommy Salo (23)
- Goals against average: Wade Flaherty (1.99)

The 1997–98 New York Islanders season was the 26th season in the franchise's history. The Islanders missed the playoffs for the fourth consecutive year.

== Off-season ==
In June 1997, New York Islanders general manager Mike Milbury extended an invitation to Cammi Granato to attend Islanders training camp. Granato eventually declined.

Defenseman Bryan McCabe was named team captain.

== Regular season ==
In February, Bryan McCabe was traded to the Vancouver Canucks in exchange for Trevor Linden, who's named the Islanders' new captain upon arrival.

The Islanders tied the Chicago Blackhawks, Florida Panthers and Pittsburgh Penguins for most short-handed goals allowed with 16.

=== Final standings ===
Atlantic Division
No.	CR		GP	W	L	T	GF	GA	Pts
1	1	**New Jersey Devils**	82	48	23	11	225	166	107
2	3	**Philadelphia Flyers**	82	42	29	11	242	193	95
3	4	**Washington Capitals**	82	40	30	12	219	202	92
4	10	New York Islanders	82	30	41	11	212	225	71
5	11	New York Rangers	82	25	39	18	197	231	68
6	12	Florida Panthers	82	24	43	15	203	256	63
7	13	Tampa Bay Lightning	82	17	55	10	151	269	44

Eastern Conference
R		Div	GP	W	L	T	GF	GA	Pts
**1**	**New Jersey Devils**	**ATL**	**82**	**48**	**23**	**11**	**225**	**166**	**107**
**2**	**Pittsburgh Penguins**	**NE**	**82**	**40**	**24**	**18**	**228**	**188**	**98**
**3**	**Philadelphia Flyers**	**ATL**	**82**	**42**	**29**	**11**	**242**	**193**	**95**
**4**	**Washington Capitals**	**ATL**	**82**	**40**	**30**	**12**	**219**	**202**	**92**
**5**	**Boston Bruins**	**NE**	**82**	**39**	**30**	**13**	**221**	**194**	**91**
**6**	**Buffalo Sabres**	**NE**	**82**	**36**	**29**	**17**	**211**	**187**	**89**
**7**	**Montreal Canadiens**	**NE**	**82**	**37**	**32**	**13**	**235**	**208**	**87**
**8**	**Ottawa Senators**	**NE**	**82**	**34**	**33**	**15**	**193**	**200**	**83**
9	Carolina Hurricanes	NE	82	33	41	8	200	219	74
10	New York Islanders	ATL	82	30	41	11	212	225	71
11	New York Rangers	ATL	82	25	39	18	197	231	68
12	Florida Panthers	ATL	82	24	43	15	203	256	63
13	Tampa Bay Lightning	ATL	82	17	55	10	151	269	44

Divisions: ATL – Atlantic, NE – Northeast

bold – Qualified for playoffs

== Schedule and results ==
1997–98 regular season
October: 5–5–2 (home: 2–3–0; road: 3–2–2)

Game	Date	Score	Opponent	Record	Recap
1	October 3, 1997	2–2 OT	@ New York Rangers (1997–98)	0–0–1	T
2	October 4, 1997	3–0	Toronto Maple Leafs (1997–98)	1–0–1	W
3	October 8, 1997	3–6	Washington Capitals (1997–98)	1–1–1	L
4	October 11, 1997	1–3	@ Washington Capitals (1997–98)	1–2–1	L
5	October 13, 1997	2–2 OT	@ Florida Panthers (1997–98)	1–2–2	T
6	October 16, 1997	5–2	@ San Jose Sharks (1997–98)	2–2–2	W
7	October 19, 1997	5–2	@ Mighty Ducks of Anaheim (1997–98)	3–2–2	W
8	October 21, 1997	2–3	@ Los Angeles Kings (1997–98)	3–3–2	L
9	October 25, 1997	2–4	Mighty Ducks of Anaheim (1997–98)	3–4–2	L
10	October 27, 1997	1–2	San Jose Sharks (1997–98)	3–5–2	L
11	October 29, 1997	5–2	@ Montreal Canadiens (1997–98)	4–5–2	W
12	October 30, 1997	5–3	New York Rangers (1997–98)	5–5–2	W

November: 6–6–2 (home: 3–3–1; road: 3–3–1)

Game	Date	Score	Opponent	Record	Recap
13	November 1, 1997	4–2	Los Angeles Kings (1997–98)	6–5–2	W
14	November 5, 1997	4–4 OT	Edmonton Oilers (1997–98)	6–5–3	T
15	November 7, 1997	3–2	@ Carolina Hurricanes (1997–98)	7–5–3	W
16	November 8, 1997	2–4	Chicago Blackhawks (1997–98)	7–6–3	L
17	November 10, 1997	1–3	New Jersey Devils (1997–98)	7–7–3	L
18	November 12, 1997	2–2 OT	@ Florida Panthers (1997–98)	7–7–4	T
19	November 14, 1997	4–1	@ Tampa Bay Lightning (1997–98)	8–7–4	W
20	November 15, 1997	0–1	Florida Panthers (1997–98)	8–8–4	L
21	November 19, 1997	3–2	@ Detroit Red Wings (1997–98)	9–8–4	W
22	November 20, 1997	1–5	@ New Jersey Devils (1997–98)	9–9–4	L
23	November 22, 1997	1–6	@ Buffalo Sabres (1997–98)	9–10–4	L
24	November 26, 1997	4–1	New York Rangers (1997–98)	10–10–4	W
25	November 28, 1997	1–4	@ Philadelphia Flyers (1997–98)	10–11–4	L
26	November 29, 1997	4–2	St. Louis Blues (1997–98)	11–11–4	W

December: 4–9–1 (home: 3–4–0; road: 1–5–1)

Game	Date	Score	Opponent	Record	Recap
27	December 2, 1997	2–4	Ottawa Senators (1997–98)	11–12–4	L
28	December 3, 1997	3–5	@ Carolina Hurricanes (1997–98)	11–13–4	L
29	December 6, 1997	4–0	Phoenix Coyotes (1997–98)	12–13–4	W
30	December 9, 1997	1–3	Calgary Flames (1997–98)	12–14–4	L
31	December 11, 1997	3–4	@ Philadelphia Flyers (1997–98)	12–15–4	L
32	December 13, 1997	4–1	Florida Panthers (1997–98)	13–15–4	W
33	December 16, 1997	2–2 OT	@ Washington Capitals (1997–98)	13–15–5	T
34	December 17, 1997	4–0	Buffalo Sabres (1997–98)	14–15–5	W
35	December 20, 1997	4–3	@ Boston Bruins (1997–98)	15–15–5	W
36	December 22, 1997	1–4	Ottawa Senators (1997–98)	15–16–5	L
37	December 26, 1997	3–4	@ New Jersey Devils (1997–98)	15–17–5	L
38	December 27, 1997	2–6	Florida Panthers (1997–98)	15–18–5	L
39	December 29, 1997	1–5	@ Pittsburgh Penguins (1997–98)	15–19–5	L
40	December 31, 1997	1–3	@ Colorado Avalanche (1997–98)	15–20–5	L

January: 3–8–2 (home: 2–3–1; road: 1–5–1)

Game	Date	Score	Opponent	Record	Recap
41	January 2, 1998	1–2	@ Dallas Stars (1997–98)	15–21–5	L
42	January 3, 1998	1–2	@ Phoenix Coyotes (1997–98)	15–22–5	L
43	January 6, 1998	2–4	Pittsburgh Penguins (1997–98)	15–23–5	L
44	January 8, 1998	2–8	Montreal Canadiens (1997–98)	15–24–5	L
45	January 10, 1998	1–2 OT	Carolina Hurricanes (1997–98)	15–25–5	L
46	January 12, 1998	1–1 OT	Detroit Red Wings (1997–98)	15–25–6	T
47	January 14, 1998	7–1	@ Tampa Bay Lightning (1997–98)	16–25–6	W
48	January 20, 1998	2–5	@ Chicago Blackhawks (1997–98)	16–26–6	L
49	January 22, 1998	3–3 OT	@ St. Louis Blues (1997–98)	16–26–7	T
50	January 24, 1998	2–3	@ Ottawa Senators (1997–98)	16–27–7	L
51	January 26, 1998	1–3	@ Philadelphia Flyers (1997–98)	16–28–7	L
52	January 28, 1998	6–1	Philadelphia Flyers (1997–98)	17–28–7	W
53	January 30, 1998	2–0	Carolina Hurricanes (1997–98)	18–28–7	W

February: 2–2–1 (home: 1–2–1; road: 1–0–0)

Game	Date	Score	Opponent	Record	Recap
54	February 1, 1998	2–2 OT	Boston Bruins (1997–98)	18–28–8	T
55	February 2, 1998	4–2	@ Pittsburgh Penguins (1997–98)	19–28–8	W
56	February 4, 1998	4–2	Montreal Canadiens (1997–98)	20–28–8	W
57	February 7, 1998	2–3	New Jersey Devils (1997–98)	20–29–8	L
58	February 25, 1998	1–4	Dallas Stars (1997–98)	20–30–8	L

March: 4–8–2 (home: 2–4–1; road: 2–4–1)

Game	Date	Score	Opponent	Record	Recap
59	March 1, 1998	4–5	Boston Bruins (1997–98)	20–31–8	L
60	March 3, 1998	3–1	Philadelphia Flyers (1997–98)	21–31–8	W
61	March 6, 1998	4–2	@ Buffalo Sabres (1997–98)	22–31–8	W
62	March 7, 1998	2–4	Colorado Avalanche (1997–98)	22–32–8	L
63	March 10, 1998	2–2 OT	Buffalo Sabres (1997–98)	22–32–9	T
64	March 12, 1998	1–2	Washington Capitals (1997–98)	22–33–9	L
65	March 14, 1998	2–6	Vancouver Canucks (1997–98)	22–34–9	L
66	March 18, 1998	4–4 OT	@ Ottawa Senators (1997–98)	22–34–10	T
67	March 20, 1998	1–4	@ Calgary Flames (1997–98)	22–35–10	L
68	March 22, 1998	3–1	@ Edmonton Oilers (1997–98)	23–35–10	W
69	March 24, 1998	3–4	@ Vancouver Canucks (1997–98)	23–36–10	L
70	March 26, 1998	4–3	Pittsburgh Penguins (1997–98)	24–36–10	W
71	March 28, 1998	3–4 OT	@ Toronto Maple Leafs (1997–98)	24–37–10	L
72	March 31, 1998	2–5	@ Washington Capitals (1997–98)	24–38–10	L

April: 6–3–1 (home: 4–1–0; road: 2–2–1)

Game	Date	Score	Opponent	Record	Recap
73	April 1, 1998	4–0	Tampa Bay Lightning (1997–98)	25–38–10	W
74	April 4, 1998	3–0	New York Rangers (1997–98)	26–38–10	W
75	April 6, 1998	3–0	@ Tampa Bay Lightning (1997–98)	27–38–10	W
76	April 8, 1998	3–2	New Jersey Devils (1997–98)	28–38–10	W
77	April 9, 1998	1–4	@ Boston Bruins (1997–98)	28–39–10	L
78	April 11, 1998	3–3 OT	@ Montreal Canadiens (1997–98)	28–39–11	T
79	April 13, 1998	0–2	Washington Capitals (1997–98)	28–40–11	L
80	April 15, 1998	2–4	@ New York Rangers (1997–98)	28–41–11	L
81	April 16, 1998	4–0	Tampa Bay Lightning (1997–98)	29–41–11	W
82	April 18, 1998	2–1	@ New Jersey Devils (1997–98)	30–41–11	W

Legend: W Win (2 points) L Loss (0 points) T Tie (1 point)

== Player statistics ==
=== Scoring ===
- Position abbreviations: C = Center; D = Defense; G = Goaltender; LW = Left wing; RW = Right wing
- † = Joined team via a transaction (e.g., trade, waivers, signing) during the season. Stats reflect time with the Islanders only.
- ‡ = Left team via a transaction (e.g., trade, waivers, release) during the season. Stats reflect time with the Islanders only.

No.	Player	Pos	Regular season					
No.	Player	Pos	GP	G	A	Pts	+/-	PIM
16	Zigmund Palffy	RW	82	45	42	87	−2	34
21	Robert Reichel	C	82	25	40	65	−11	32
34	Bryan Berard	D	75	14	32	46	−32	59
20	Bryan Smolinski	C	81	13	30	43	−16	34
29	Kenny Jonsson	D	81	14	26	40	−2	58
14	Tom Chorske	LW	82	12	23	35	7	39
17	Sergei Nemchinov	LW	74	10	19	29	3	24
39	Travis Green‡	C	54	14	12	26	−19	66
25	Mariusz Czerkawski	RW	68	12	13	25	11	23
13	Claude Lapointe	C	78	10	10	20	−9	47
44	Todd Bertuzzi‡	RW	52	7	11	18	−19	58
32	Trevor Linden†	RW	25	10	7	17	−1	33
7	Scott Lachance	D	63	2	11	13	−11	45
18	Mike Hough	LW	74	5	7	12	−4	27
4	Bryan McCabe‡	D	56	3	9	12	9	145
24	Paul Kruse‡	LW	62	6	1	7	−12	138
2	Rich Pilon	D	76	0	7	7	1	291
10	Joe Sacco†	RW	25	3	3	6	1	10
36	J. J. Daigneault†	D	18	0	6	6	1	21
33	Ken Belanger	LW	37	3	1	4	1	101
54	Kip Miller†	C	9	1	3	4	−2	2
44	Jason Dawe†	RW	13	1	2	3	−2	6
6	Doug Houda‡	D	31	1	2	3	−6	47
28	Dennis Vaske	D	19	0	3	3	2	12
36	Dane Jackson	RW	8	1	1	2	1	4
55	Vladimir Chebaturkin	D	2	0	2	2	−1	0
3 (Note: Chara wore number 53 in his first seven games.)	Zdeno Chara	D	25	0	1	1	1	50
30	Wade Flaherty	G	16	0	1	1		0
58	John Namestnikov	D	6	0	1	1	−1	4
49	Vladimir Orszagh	RW	11	0	1	1	−3	2
42	Dan Plante	RW	7	0	1	1	−1	6
35	Tommy Salo	G	62	0	1	1		31
60	Ray Schultz	D	13	0	1	1	3	45
43	Jason Strudwick‡	D	17	0	1	1	1	36
1	Eric Fichaud	G	17	0	0	0		0
11	Sean Haggerty	LW	5	0	0	0	−3	0
46	Jason Holland‡	D	8	0	0	0	−4	4
12	Mark Janssens†‡	C	12	0	0	0	−3	34
52	Mark Lawrence	RW	2	0	0	0	0	2
37	Jeff Libby	D	1	0	0	0	0	0
48	Warren Luhning	RW	8	0	0	0	−4	0
24	Gino Odjick†	RW	13	0	0	0	1	31
8	Steve Webb	RW	20	0	0	0	−2	35

=== Goaltending ===
No.	Player	Regular season									
No.	Player	GP	W	L	T	SA	GA	GAA	SV%	SO	TOI
35	Tommy Salo	62	23	29	5	1617	152	2.64	.906	4	3461
30	Wade Flaherty	16	4	4	3	309	23	1.99	.926	3	694
1	Eric Fichaud	17	3	8	3	422	40	2.97	.905	0	807

== Awards and records ==
=== Awards ===
Type	Award/honor	Recipient	Ref
League (in-season)	NHL All-Star Game selection	Zigmund Palffy	
Team	Bob Nystrom Award	Rich Pilon	

=== Milestones ===
Milestone	Player	Date	Ref
First game	Warren Luhning	October 4, 1997	
First game	Zdeno Chara	November 19, 1997	
First game	Vladimir Orszagh	November 22, 1997	
First game	Vladimir Chebaturkin	March 24, 1998	
First game	Ray Schultz	March 24, 1998	
First game	Jeff Libby	March 26, 1998	

== Draft picks ==
New York's draft picks at the 1997 NHL entry draft held at the Civic Arena in Pittsburgh, Pennsylvania.

Round	#	Player	Nationality	College/Junior/Club team (League)
1	4	Roberto Luongo	Canada	Val-d'Or Foreurs (QMJHL)
1	5	Eric Brewer	Canada	Prince George Cougars (WHL)
2	31	Jeff Zehr	Canada	Windsor Spitfires (OHL)
3	59	Jarrett Smith	Canada	Prince George Cougars (WHL)
3	79	Robert Schnabel	Czech Republic	Slavia Prague (Czech Republic)
4	85	Petr Mika	Czech Republic	Slavia Prague (Czech Republic)
5	115	Adam Edinger	United States	Bowling Green State University (CCHA)
6	139	Bobby Leavins	Canada	Brandon Wheat Kings (WHL)
7	166	Kris Knoblauch	Canada	Edmonton Ice (WHL)
8	196	Jeremy Symington	Canada	Petrolia Jets (WOHL)
9	222	Ryan Clark	United States	Lincoln Stars (USHL)
