= 1997–98 Ottawa Senators season =

NHL hockey team season

1997–98 Ottawa Senators
- Division: 5th Northeast
- Conference: 8th Eastern
- 1997–98 record: 34–33–15
- Home record: 18–16–7
- Road record: 16–17–8
- Goals for: 193
- Goals against: 200

Team information
- General manager: Pierre Gauthier
- Coach: Jacques Martin
- Captain: Randy Cunneyworth
- Alternate captains: Daniel Alfredsson; Alexei Yashin
- Arena: Corel Centre
- Average attendance: 16,750
- Minor league affiliates: Worcester IceCats; Raleigh IceCaps

Team leaders
- Goals: Alexei Yashin (33)
- Assists: Alexei Yashin (39)
- Points: Alexei Yashin (72)
- Penalty minutes: Denny Lambert (250)
- Plus/minus: Wade Redden (+17)
- Wins: Damian Rhodes (19)
- Goals against average: Ron Tugnutt (2.25)

The 1997–98 Ottawa Senators season was the sixth season of the Ottawa Senators of the National Hockey League (NHL). The season saw the Senators face the challenge of improving on their very successful 1996–97 season, when they made the playoffs for the first time in team history. The 1997–98 season was even more successful, as Ottawa finished over .500 for the first time in club history, qualified for the playoffs for the second straight year, and won their first playoff series in modern club history. The Senators defeated the top-seeded New Jersey Devils in six games in the first round before falling to the Washington Capitals in five games in the second round.

== Regular season ==
Northeast Division teams

Alexei Yashin led the club offensively, with 72 points (33 goals, 39 assists) in 82 games. Damian Rhodes and Ron Tugnutt once again performed solidly in the Senators' net, helping set a club record for fewest goals allowed (200).

The Alexandre Daigle era came to an end midway through the season, as the Senators traded him to the Philadelphia Flyers in exchange for Václav Prospal and Pat Falloon.

=== Final standings ===
Northeast Division
No.	CR		GP	W	L	T	GF	GA	Pts
1	2	**Pittsburgh Penguins**	82	40	24	18	228	188	98
2	5	**Boston Bruins**	82	39	30	13	221	194	91
3	6	**Buffalo Sabres**	82	36	29	17	211	187	89
4	7	**Montreal Canadiens**	82	37	32	13	235	208	87
5	8	**Ottawa Senators**	82	34	33	15	193	200	83
6	9	Carolina Hurricanes	82	33	41	8	200	219	74

Eastern Conference
R		Div	GP	W	L	T	GF	GA	Pts
**1**	**New Jersey Devils**	**ATL**	**82**	**48**	**23**	**11**	**225**	**166**	**107**
**2**	**Pittsburgh Penguins**	**NE**	**82**	**40**	**24**	**18**	**228**	**188**	**98**
**3**	**Philadelphia Flyers**	**ATL**	**82**	**42**	**29**	**11**	**242**	**193**	**95**
**4**	**Washington Capitals**	**ATL**	**82**	**40**	**30**	**12**	**219**	**202**	**92**
**5**	**Boston Bruins**	**NE**	**82**	**39**	**30**	**13**	**221**	**194**	**91**
**6**	**Buffalo Sabres**	**NE**	**82**	**36**	**29**	**17**	**211**	**187**	**89**
**7**	**Montreal Canadiens**	**NE**	**82**	**37**	**32**	**13**	**235**	**208**	**87**
**8**	**Ottawa Senators**	**NE**	**82**	**34**	**33**	**15**	**193**	**200**	**83**
9	Carolina Hurricanes	NE	82	33	41	8	200	219	74
10	New York Islanders	ATL	82	30	41	11	212	225	71
11	New York Rangers	ATL	82	25	39	18	197	231	68
12	Florida Panthers	ATL	82	24	43	15	203	256	63
13	Tampa Bay Lightning	ATL	82	17	55	10	151	269	44

Divisions: ATL – Atlantic, NE – Northeast

bold – Qualified for playoffs

== Playoffs ==
The Ottawa Senators ended the 1997–98 regular season as the Eastern Conference's eighth seed. Daniel Alfredsson, who missed 27 games in the regular season due to injuries, led the team with nine points (seven goals, two assists) in the playoffs and the club won its first round matchup, an upset win over the New Jersey Devils

=== Eastern Conference Quarterfinals ===
On paper, the series was a big mismatch, as the Devils had finished 24 points ahead in the standings. One American newspaper covering the playoffs did not even preview the series, expecting an easy win for the Devils. The Devils were characterized as arrogant, although the Devils and the Senators had split their season series. Devil Randy McKay, when asked which player on the Senators he respected, said, "To be honest, I'd have to see their (roster) list."

The series opened in New Jersey. In Game 1, the Senators got a 1–0 lead and held onto it until 3:24 was left in the third period, when Doug Gilmour scored to tie the game. After the goal, the Devils got several penalties in a row, including some in overtime. Although the Senators went 0–6 on the power play, they managed to win the game on an overtime winner from Bruce Gardiner at 5:58. In Game 2, the Devils won the game in large part due to the offence of Doug Gilmour, who assisted on the first goal and scored the second, game-winning goal and an empty netter to tie the series.

The series now moved to Ottawa for Games 3 and 4. In Game 3, Damian Rhodes played outstanding and Alexei Yashin scored the winner, 2:47 into overtime on the power play. According to Devils' goaltender Martin Brodeur, "It's Rhodes, that's the bottom line. He has been tremendous. We're getting the puck to him, we're getting rebounds, but he closes the door every time." Devils Head Coach Jacques Lemaire refused to appear for the post-game press conference. The Senators won Game 4, 4–3, on the strength of a hat-trick by Daniel Alfredsson. The Senators had led 4–1, but late goals by Scott Stevens and Doug Gilmour, with 69 seconds left, made it a close contest.

The series now returned to New Jersey, with the Devils on the brink of elimination. In Game 5, Brodeur stopped 22 of 23 shots and even assisted on a short-handed goal as the Devils won 3–1. Gilmour scored the game-winner and the Devils staved off elimination.

In Game 6, Janne Laukkanen scored the winner, giving the Senators the lead that was solidified when Igor Kravchuk scored into an empty net to complete the series upset, 4–2, for the Senators. After the game, Scott Stevens commented, "The bottom line is that they're an average team that played great. And we're an above average team that played poorly." The headlines from other newspapers labelled the playoff win a "titanic upset" and "sensational upset."

=== Eastern Conference Semifinals ===
The Senators did not capitalize on their first-round win, and the Capitals took the series in five games.

== Schedule and results ==
=== Regular season ===
1997–98 regular season
October: 8–3–3 (home: 4–1–1; road: 4–2–2)

Game	Date	Score	Opponent	Record	Attendance	Recap
1	October 1, 1997	2–2 OT	@ Montreal Canadiens (1997–98)	0–0–1	20,673	T
2	October 3, 1997	3–5	@ Philadelphia Flyers (1997–98)	0–1–1	19,231	L
3	October 4, 1997	3–2	Carolina Hurricanes (1997–98)	1–1–1	18,500	W
4	October 7, 1997	1–0	@ San Jose Sharks (1997–98)	2–1–1	16,073	W
5	October 10, 1997	1–1 OT	@ Mighty Ducks of Anaheim (1997–98)	2–1–2	17,174	T
6	October 12, 1997	4–7	@ Los Angeles Kings (1997–98)	2–2–2	16,005	L
7	October 15, 1997	5–1	New York Rangers (1997–98)	3–2–2	17,111	W
8	October 17, 1997	4–2	New Jersey Devils (1997–98)	4–2–2	13,681	W
9	October 19, 1997	3–1	Dallas Stars (1997–98)	5–2–2	14,354	W
10	October 22, 1997	6–2	@ Toronto Maple Leafs (1997–98)	6–2–2	15,726	W
11	October 23, 1997	2–2 OT	Florida Panthers (1997–98)	6–2–3	15,168	T
12	October 25, 1997	2–4	Montreal Canadiens (1997–98)	6–3–3	18,500	L
13	October 29, 1997	5–2	@ Tampa Bay Lightning (1997–98)	7–3–3	10,776	W
14	October 30, 1997	5–2	@ Florida Panthers (1997–98)	8–3–3	14,703	W

November: 2–10–1 (home: 2–7–0; road: 0–3–1)

Game	Date	Score	Opponent	Record	Attendance	Recap
15	November 2, 1997	1–3	Boston Bruins (1997–98)	8–4–3	16,753	L
16	November 6, 1997	4–1	Phoenix Coyotes (1997–98)	9–4–3	13,437	W
17	November 8, 1997	3–4	Philadelphia Flyers (1997–98)	9–5–3	18,500	L
18	November 9, 1997	1–4	@ Carolina Hurricanes (1997–98)	9–6–3	5,551	L
19	November 11, 1997	0–1	@ Philadelphia Flyers (1997–98)	9–7–3	19,314	L
20	November 13, 1997	2–4	Detroit Red Wings (1997–98)	9–8–3	18,136	L
21	November 15, 1997	3–3 OT	@ Boston Bruins (1997–98)	9–8–4	14,761	T
22	November 17, 1997	2–4	Boston Bruins (1997–98)	9–9–4	15,742	L
23	November 20, 1997	0–2	Pittsburgh Penguins (1997–98)	9–10–4	14,097	L
24	November 22, 1997	0–1	Edmonton Oilers (1997–98)	9–11–4	17,113	L
25	November 26, 1997	1–4	@ Detroit Red Wings (1997–98)	9–12–4	19,983	L
26	November 27, 1997	3–1	Washington Capitals (1997–98)	10–12–4	13,671	W
27	November 29, 1997	2–3	Chicago Blackhawks (1997–98)	10–13–4	18,251	L

December: 8–5–0 (home: 4–2–0; road: 4–3–0)

Game	Date	Score	Opponent	Record	Attendance	Recap
28	December 2, 1997	4–2	@ New York Islanders (1997–98)	11–13–4	8,141	W
29	December 4, 1997	3–2	Los Angeles Kings (1997–98)	12–13–4	14,108	W
30	December 6, 1997	3–0	Buffalo Sabres (1997–98)	13–13–4	15,285	W
31	December 11, 1997	1–2	St. Louis Blues (1997–98)	13–14–4	14,961	L
32	December 13, 1997	1–3	Tampa Bay Lightning (1997–98)	13–15–4	14,290	L
33	December 15, 1997	3–1	@ St. Louis Blues (1997–98)	14–15–4	14,155	W
34	December 16, 1997	1–2	@ Carolina Hurricanes (1997–98)	14–16–4	7,317	L
35	December 18, 1997	3–2	Carolina Hurricanes (1997–98)	15–16–4	14,437	W
36	December 20, 1997	1–4	@ Montreal Canadiens (1997–98)	15–17–4	20,910	L
37	December 22, 1997	4–1	@ New York Islanders (1997–98)	16–17–4	10,227	W
38	December 23, 1997	4–3 OT	Montreal Canadiens (1997–98)	17–17–4	18,500	W
39	December 27, 1997	3–0	@ Washington Capitals (1997–98)	18–17–4	17,921	W
40	December 31, 1997	0–3	@ Buffalo Sabres (1997–98)	18–18–4	15,636	L

January: 4–5–5 (home: 2–2–1; road: 2–3–4)

Game	Date	Score	Opponent	Record	Attendance	Recap
41	January 1, 1998	0–0 OT	@ Boston Bruins (1997–98)	18–18–5	13,714	T
42	January 3, 1998	2–7	Philadelphia Flyers (1997–98)	18–19–5	18,500	L
43	January 5, 1998	1–4	@ Carolina Hurricanes (1997–98)	18–20–5	6,055	L
44	January 7, 1998	2–0	@ Dallas Stars (1997–98)	19–20–5	16,928	W
45	January 10, 1998	3–3 OT	@ Colorado Avalanche (1997–98)	19–20–6	16,061	T
46	January 11, 1998	4–4 OT	@ Phoenix Coyotes (1997–98)	19–20–7	13,963	T
47	January 13, 1998	0–4	@ Washington Capitals (1997–98)	19–21–7	11,109	L
48	January 20, 1998	0–0 OT	@ Pittsburgh Penguins (1997–98)	19–21–8	13,116	T
49	January 22, 1998	2–4	Carolina Hurricanes (1997–98)	19–22–8	15,491	L
50	January 24, 1998	3–2	New York Islanders (1997–98)	20–22–8	18,327	W
51	January 26, 1998	2–1	Tampa Bay Lightning (1997–98)	21–22–8	13,804	W
52	January 27, 1998	1–6	@ Boston Bruins (1997–98)	21–23–8	14,183	L
53	January 29, 1998	2–2 OT	New York Rangers (1997–98)	21–23–9	18,500	T
54	January 31, 1998	4–3	@ Montreal Canadiens (1997–98)	22–23–9	21,273	W

February: 1–4–1 (home: 1–1–1; road: 0–3–0)

Game	Date	Score	Opponent	Record	Attendance	Recap
55	February 2, 1998	0–1	New Jersey Devils (1997–98)	22–24–9	15,675	L
56	February 4, 1998	0–2	@ New Jersey Devils (1997–98)	22–25–9	15,302	L
57	February 5, 1998	3–2	Toronto Maple Leafs (1997–98)	23–25–9	18,500	W
58	February 7, 1998	2–2 OT	Pittsburgh Penguins (1997–98)	23–25–10	18,500	T
59	February 25, 1998	2–5	@ Edmonton Oilers (1997–98)	23–26–10	16,142	L
60	February 28, 1998	4–6	@ Vancouver Canucks (1997–98)	23–27–10	17,233	L

March: 5–4–3 (home: 4–1–2; road: 1–3–1)

Game	Date	Score	Opponent	Record	Attendance	Recap
61	March 1, 1998	1–2	@ Calgary Flames (1997–98)	23–28–10	17,463	L
62	March 5, 1998	4–2	Colorado Avalanche (1997–98)	24–28–10	18,500	W
63	March 7, 1998	2–1	Calgary Flames (1997–98)	25–28–10	18,036	W
64	March 11, 1998	5–3	Florida Panthers (1997–98)	26–28–10	15,539	W
65	March 14, 1998	4–0	Washington Capitals (1997–98)	27–28–10	18,500	W
66	March 16, 1998	4–5	@ New York Rangers (1997–98)	27–29–10	18,200	L
67	March 18, 1998	4–4 OT	New York Islanders (1997–98)	27–29–11	17,403	T
68	March 20, 1998	1–1 OT	Vancouver Canucks (1997–98)	27–29–12	18,500	T
69	March 22, 1998	2–5	Mighty Ducks of Anaheim (1997–98)	27–30–12	17,177	L
70	March 25, 1998	3–2 OT	@ New York Rangers (1997–98)	28–30–12	18,200	W
71	March 27, 1998	1–2	@ Chicago Blackhawks (1997–98)	28–31–12	19,172	L
72	March 29, 1998	1–1 OT	@ Pittsburgh Penguins (1997–98)	28–31–13	14,322	T

April: 6–2–2 (home: 1–2–2; road: 5–0–0)

Game	Date	Score	Opponent	Record	Attendance	Recap
73	April 2, 1998	3–3 OT	San Jose Sharks (1997–98)	28–31–14	18,119	T
74	April 3, 1998	3–2	@ New Jersey Devils (1997–98)	29–31–14	17,313	W
75	April 5, 1998	1–0	@ Buffalo Sabres (1997–98)	30–31–14	15,661	W
76	April 7, 1998	2–4	Boston Bruins (1997–98)	30–32–14	18,226	L
77	April 9, 1998	4–1	Pittsburgh Penguins (1997–98)	31–32–14	17,895	W
78	April 11, 1998	4–4 OT	Buffalo Sabres (1997–98)	31–32–15	18,500	T
79	April 13, 1998	3–2	@ Tampa Bay Lightning (1997–98)	32–32–15	12,387	W
80	April 14, 1998	3–2	@ Florida Panthers (1997–98)	33–32–15	14,703	W
81	April 16, 1998	0–2	Montreal Canadiens (1997–98)	33–33–15	18,500	L
82	April 19, 1998	2–1	@ Buffalo Sabres (1997–98)	34–33–15	18,595	W

Legend: W Win (2 points) L Loss (0 points) T Tie (1 point)

=== Playoffs ===
1998 Stanley Cup playoffs
Eastern Conference Quarterfinals vs. (1) New Jersey Devils – Senators win 4–2

Game	Date	Score	Opponent	Series	Attendance	Recap
1	April 22, 1998	2–1 OT	@ New Jersey Devils	Senators lead 1–0	18,457	W
2	April 24, 1998	1–3	@ New Jersey Devils	Series tied 1–1	19,040	L
3	April 26, 1998	2–1 OT	New Jersey Devils	Senators lead 2–1	18,500	W
4	April 28, 1998	4–3	New Jersey Devils	Senators lead 3–1	18,500	W
5	April 30, 1998	1–3	@ New Jersey Devils	Senators lead 3–2	19,040	L
6	May 2, 1998	3–1	New Jersey Devils	Senators win 4–2	18,500	W

Eastern Conference Semifinals vs. (4) Washington Capitals – Capitals win 4–1

Game	Date	Score	Opponent	Series	Attendance	Recap
1	May 7, 1998	2–4	@ Washington Capitals	Capitals lead 1–0	17,941	L
2	May 9, 1998	1–6	@ Washington Capitals	Capitals lead 2–0	19,740	L
3	May 11, 1998	4–3	Washington Capitals	Capitals lead 2–1	18,500	W
4	May 13, 1998	0–2	Washington Capitals	Capitals lead 3–1	18,500	L
5	May 15, 1998	0–3	@ Washington Capitals	Capitals win 4–1	19,740	L

Legend: W Win L Loss

== Player statistics ==
=== Scoring ===
- Position abbreviations: C = Centre; D = Defence; G = Goaltender; LW = Left wing; RW = Right wing
- † = Joined team via a transaction (e.g., trade, waivers, signing) during the season. Stats reflect time with the Senators only.
- ‡ = Left team via a transaction (e.g., trade, waivers, release) during the season. Stats reflect time with the Senators only.

No.	Player	Pos	Regular season						Playoffs					
No.	Player	Pos	GP	G	A	Pts	+/-	PIM	GP	G	A	Pts	+/-	PIM
19	Alexei Yashin	C	82	33	39	72	6	24	11	5	3	8	−6	8
15	Shawn McEachern	LW	81	24	24	48	1	42	11	0	4	4	−6	8
11	Daniel Alfredsson	RW	55	17	28	45	7	18	11	7	2	9	−4	20
29	Igor Kravchuk	D	81	8	27	35	−19	8	11	2	3	5	−2	4
10	Andreas Dackell	RW	82	15	18	33	−11	24	11	1	1	2	−4	2
20	Magnus Arvedson	LW	61	11	15	26	2	36	11	0	1	1	−6	6
16	Sergei Zholtok	C	78	10	13	23	−7	16	11	0	2	2	−1	0
6	Wade Redden	D	80	8	14	22	17	27	9	0	2	2	−5	2
27	Janne Laukkanen	D	60	4	17	21	−15	64	11	2	2	4	−3	8
28	Denny Lambert	LW	72	9	10	19	4	250	11	0	0	0	2	19
22	Shaun Van Allen	C	80	4	15	19	4	48	11	0	1	1	−3	10
25	Bruce Gardiner	RW	55	7	11	18	2	50	11	1	3	4	−2	2
14	Radek Bonk	C	65	7	9	16	−13	16	5	0	0	0	−3	2
9	Alexandre Daigle‡	C	38	7	9	16	−7	8	—	—	—	—	—	—
4 (Note: Phillips wore number 5 through November 22.)	Chris Phillips	D	72	5	11	16	2	38	11	0	2	2	−2	2
33	Jason York	D	73	3	13	16	8	62	7	1	1	2	−2	7
7	Randy Cunneyworth	LW	71	2	11	13	−14	63	6	0	1	1	0	6
2	Lance Pitlick	D	69	2	7	9	8	50	11	0	1	1	−3	17
17	Chris Murray†	RW	46	5	3	8	1	96	11	1	0	1	−2	8
13	Vaclav Prospal†	C	15	1	6	7	−1	4	6	0	0	0	−2	0
12	Pat Falloon†	RW	28	3	3	6	−11	8	1	0	0	0	0	0
24	Stan Neckar	D	60	2	2	4	−14	31	9	0	0	0	−4	2
26	Phil Crowe	LW	9	3	0	3	3	24	—	—	—	—	—	—
42	Derek Armstrong	C	9	2	0	2	1	9	—	—	—	—	—	—
4	Sean Hill‡	D	13	1	1	2	−3	6	—	—	—	—	—	—
3	Per Gustafsson†	D	9	0	1	1	3	6	1	0	0	0	−2	0
18	Marian Hossa	RW	7	0	1	1	−1	0	—	—	—	—	—	—
1	Damian Rhodes	G	50	0	1	1		0	10	0	0	0		0
23	Radim Bicanek	D	1	0	0	0	0	0	—	—	—	—	—	—
48	Ivan Ciernik	RW	2	0	0	0	0	0	—	—	—	—	—	—
31	Ron Tugnutt	G	42	0	0	0		0	2	0	0	0		0
21	Dennis Vial	LW	19	0	0	0	0	45	—	—	—	—	—	—
38	Jason Zent	LW	3	0	0	0	0	4	—	—	—	—	—	—

=== Goaltending ===
No.	Player	Regular season										Playoffs								
No.	Player	GP	W	L	T	SA	GA	GAA	SV%	SO	TOI	GP	W	L	SA	GA	GAA	SV%	SO	TOI
1	Damian Rhodes	50	19	19	7	1148	107	2.34	.907	5	2743	10	5	5	236	21	2.14	.911	0	590
31	Ron Tugnutt	42	15	14	8	882	84	2.25	.905	3	2236	2	0	1	25	6	4.86	.760	0	74

== Awards and records ==
=== Awards ===
Type	Award/honour	Recipient	Ref
League (in-season)	NHL All-Star Game selection	Daniel Alfredsson	
League (in-season)	NHL All-Star Game selection	Igor Kravchuk	
Team	Molson Cup	Alexei Yashin	

=== Milestones ===
Milestone	Player	Date	Ref
First game	Magnus Arvedson	October 1, 1997	
First game	Marian Hossa	October 1, 1997	
First game	Chris Phillips	October 1, 1997	
First game	Ivan Ciernik	November 17, 1997	

== Transactions ==
=== June 1997 ===
June 17	Re-signed Jason Zent to a 1-year, $350,000 contract.
June 21	Acquired a 3rd round draft pick in the 1997 NHL entry draft - (Jani Hurme) and a 3rd round draft pick in the 1997 NHL entry draft - (Josh Langfeld) from the New Jersey Devils for a 2nd round draft pick in the 1997 NHL entry draft - (Stanislav Gron)

=== July 1997 ===
July 3	Signed free agent Marc LaBelle from the Dallas Stars to a 1-year contract.
July 17	Signed free agent Clayton Beddoes from the Boston Bruins to a 1-year contract.
July 28	Re-signed Denny Lambert to a 1-year, $243,750 contract. Signed free agent Derek Armstrong from the New York Islanders to a 1-year contract.
July 29	Re-signed Jason York to a 2-year, $1.4 million contract.
July 31	Signed Justin Hocking to a 1-year contract. Signed Mike Prokopec to a 1-year contract.

=== August 1997 ===
August 1	Re-signed Janne Laukkanen to a 2-year, $1.4 million contract. Re-signed Phil Crowe to a 1-year contract.
August 12	Re-signed Mike Maneluk to a multi-year contract.
August 25	Acquired Igor Kravchuk from the St. Louis Blues for Steve Duchesne.
August 26	Re-signed Lance Pitlick to a 2-year, $881,250 contract.

=== September 1997 ===
September 9	Re-signed Stanislav Neckář to a 1-year, $650,000 contract.
September 24	Acquired a 6th round draft pick in the 1998 NHL entry draft - (Chris Neil) from the Chicago Blackhawks for Kirk Daubenspeck.
September 28	Lost Tom Chorske in 1997 NHL Waiver Draft to the New York Islanders.

=== October 1997 ===
October 6	Re-signed Shaun Van Allen to a 2-year, $975,000 contract extension beginning in 1998-99 to 1999-2000.
October 12	Re-signed Daniel Alfredsson to a 4-year, $10 million contract.
October 21	Traded Mike Maneluk to the Philadelphia Flyers for future considerations.

=== November 1997 ===
November 7	Re-signed Alexandre Daigle to a 1-year, $1.9 million contract extension for the 1998-99 season.
November 17	Acquired Chris Murray from the Carolina Hurricanes for Sean Hill.

=== January 1998 ===
January 17	Acquired Václav Prospal, Pat Falloon and a 2nd round pick in the 1998 NHL entry draft - (Chris Bala) from the Philadelphia Flyers for Alexandre Daigle.

=== March 1998 ===
March 9	Acquired Scott Ferguson from the Edmonton Oilers for Frank Musil.
March 17	Acquired Per Gustafsson from the Toronto Maple Leafs for an 8th round pick in the 1998 NHL entry draft - (Dwight Wolfe).

== Draft picks ==
Ottawa's draft picks at the 1997 NHL entry draft in Pittsburgh, Pennsylvania.

Round	#	Player	Nationality	College/Junior/Club team (League)
1	12	Marian Hossa	Slovakia	Dukla Trencin (Slovak Extraliga)
3	58	Jani Hurme	Finland	TPS (SM-liiga)
3	66	Josh Langfeld	United States	Lincoln Stars (USHL)
5	119	Magnus Arvedson	Sweden	Farjestad BK (Elitserien)
6	146	Jeff Sullivan	Canada	Halifax Mooseheads (QMJHL)
7	173	Robin Bacul	Czech Republic	Slavia Prague (Czech Extraliga)
8	203	Nick Gillis	United States	Cushing Academy (USHS-MA)
9	229	Karel Rachunek	Czech Republic	Zlin ZPS (Czech Extraliga)

== Farm teams ==
=== Worcester IceCats ===
The Senators and St. Louis Blues continued to share an American Hockey League affiliate with the Worcester IceCats for the 1997–98 season. The club was coached by Greg Gilbert.

The club finished fourth in the New England Division with a 34–31–9–6 record, earning 83 points and qualifying for the post-season. In the playoffs, the IceCats upset the top ranked Springfield Falcons before losing to the Hartford Wolf Pack in the divisional finals.

The top scoring Senators player was Mike Prokopec, who recorded 21 goals and 46 points. Jason Zent scored 25 goals and 42 points. Frédéric Cassivi led the team with 20 victories.

=== Raleigh IceCaps ===
The Senators and New Jersey Devils continued to share an ECHL affiliate with the Raleigh IceCaps for the 1997–98 season. The club was coached by Dan Wiebe.

Raleigh finished the season with a 32–33–5 record, earning 69 points and finishing in fifth place in the Southeast Division. The IceCaps failed to qualify for the playoffs.

== See also ==
- 1997–98 NHL season
