= 1997–98 Carolina Hurricanes season =

National Hockey League team season

1997–98 Carolina Hurricanes
- Division: 6th Northeast
- Conference: 9th Eastern
- 1997–98 record: 33–41–8
- Home record: 16–18–7
- Road record: 17–23–1
- Goals for: 200
- Goals against: 219

Team information
- General manager: Jim Rutherford
- Coach: Paul Maurice
- Captain: Kevin Dineen
- Alternate captains: Keith Primeau; Unknown
- Arena: Greensboro Coliseum
- Average attendance: 9,086
- Minor league affiliates: Beast of New Haven; Richmond Renegades

Team leaders
- Goals: Sami Kapanen (26); Keith Primeau (26)
- Assists: Sami Kapanen (37); Keith Primeau (37)
- Points: Sami Kapanen (63); Keith Primeau (63)
- Penalty minutes: Stu Grimson (204)
- Plus/minus: Keith Primeau (+19)
- Wins: Trevor Kidd (21)
- Goals against average: Trevor Kidd (2.17)

The 1997–98 Carolina Hurricanes season was the 26th season in franchise history, their 19th as a member of the National Hockey League (NHL), and their first in North Carolina. Formerly the Hartford Whalers, the team would play in Greensboro while a new arena was being constructed in Raleigh. The club finished sub-.500 and failed to qualify for the 1998 Stanley Cup playoffs.

== Offseason ==
In March 1997, Whalers owner Peter Karmanos announced that the team would move elsewhere after the 1996–97 season because of the team's inability to negotiate a satisfactory construction and lease package for a new arena to replace the Hartford Civic Center. In July, Karmanos announced that the Whalers would move to the Research Triangle area of North Carolina and the new Entertainment and Sports Arena in Raleigh, become the Carolina Hurricanes, and change their team colors to red and black. Due to the relatively short time frame for the move, Karmanos himself thought of and decided upon the new name for the club, rather than holding a contest as is sometimes done.

Unfortunately, the ESA would not be complete for two more years. The only arena in the Triangle with an ice plant was Dorton Arena in Raleigh, which only seated 5,100 people—too small even for temporary use. The Hurricanes decided to play home games in Greensboro, ninety minutes away from Raleigh, for their first two seasons after the move. This choice was disastrous for the franchise's attendance and reputation. With a capacity of over 21,000 people for hockey, the Greensboro Coliseum became the highest-capacity arena in the NHL, but Triangle-area fans proved unwilling to make the drive down I-40 to Greensboro, and fans from the Piedmont Triad mostly refused to support a lame-duck team that had displaced the longtime Greensboro/Carolina Monarchs minor-league franchise. Furthermore, only 29 out of 82 games were televised, and radio play-by-play coverage on WPTF was often pre-empted by North Carolina State Wolfpack basketball (for whose broadcasts WPTF was the flagship station), leaving these games totally unavailable to those who did not have a ticket. With by far the smallest season-ticket base in the NHL and attendance routinely well below the league average, Sports Illustrated ran a story titled "Natural Disaster," and ESPN anchors mocked the "Green Acres" of empty seats; in a 2006 interview, Karmanos admitted that "as it turns out, [Greensboro] was probably a mistake."

== Regular season ==
=== Final standings ===
Northeast Division
No.	CR		GP	W	L	T	GF	GA	Pts
1	2	**Pittsburgh Penguins**	82	40	24	18	228	188	98
2	5	**Boston Bruins**	82	39	30	13	221	194	91
3	6	**Buffalo Sabres**	82	36	29	17	211	187	89
4	7	**Montreal Canadiens**	82	37	32	13	235	208	87
5	8	**Ottawa Senators**	82	34	33	15	193	200	83
6	9	Carolina Hurricanes	82	33	41	8	200	219	74

Eastern Conference
R		Div	GP	W	L	T	GF	GA	Pts
**1**	**New Jersey Devils**	**ATL**	**82**	**48**	**23**	**11**	**225**	**166**	**107**
**2**	**Pittsburgh Penguins**	**NE**	**82**	**40**	**24**	**18**	**228**	**188**	**98**
**3**	**Philadelphia Flyers**	**ATL**	**82**	**42**	**29**	**11**	**242**	**193**	**95**
**4**	**Washington Capitals**	**ATL**	**82**	**40**	**30**	**12**	**219**	**202**	**92**
**5**	**Boston Bruins**	**NE**	**82**	**39**	**30**	**13**	**221**	**194**	**91**
**6**	**Buffalo Sabres**	**NE**	**82**	**36**	**29**	**17**	**211**	**187**	**89**
**7**	**Montreal Canadiens**	**NE**	**82**	**37**	**32**	**13**	**235**	**208**	**87**
**8**	**Ottawa Senators**	**NE**	**82**	**34**	**33**	**15**	**193**	**200**	**83**
9	Carolina Hurricanes	NE	82	33	41	8	200	219	74
10	New York Islanders	ATL	82	30	41	11	212	225	71
11	New York Rangers	ATL	82	25	39	18	197	231	68
12	Florida Panthers	ATL	82	24	43	15	203	256	63
13	Tampa Bay Lightning	ATL	82	17	55	10	151	269	44

Divisions: ATL – Atlantic, NE – Northeast

bold – Qualified for playoffs

== Schedule and results ==
1997–98 regular season
October: 3–8–3 (home: 2–2–2; road: 1–6–1)

Game	Date	Score	Opponent	Record	Attendance	Recap
1	October 1, 1997	2–4	@ Tampa Bay Lightning (1997–98)	0–1–0	17,808	L
2	October 3, 1997	3–4	Pittsburgh Penguins (1997–98)	0–2–0	18,661	L
3	October 4, 1997	2–3	@ Ottawa Senators (1997–98)	0–3–0	18,500	L
4	October 7, 1997	3–3 OT	Los Angeles Kings (1997–98)	0–3–1	6,083	T
5	October 10, 1997	2–1	New Jersey Devils (1997–98)	1–3–1	6,352	W
6	October 11, 1997	1–4	@ Pittsburgh Penguins (1997–98)	1–4–1	15,175	L
7	October 13, 1997	1–3	@ St. Louis Blues (1997–98)	1–5–1	12,530	L
8	October 15, 1997	3–3 OT	Buffalo Sabres (1997–98)	1–5–2	6,278	T
9	October 18, 1997	2–4	@ Detroit Red Wings (1997–98)	1–6–2	19,983	L
10	October 20, 1997	2–4	@ New York Rangers (1997–98)	1–7–2	18,200	L
11	October 22, 1997	4–3	St. Louis Blues (1997–98)	2–7–2	8,185	W
12	October 24, 1997	3–3 OT	@ Colorado Avalanche (1997–98)	2–7–3	16,061	T
13	October 26, 1997	3–2	@ Chicago Blackhawks (1997–98)	3–7–3	14,834	W
14	October 31, 1997	2–3 OT	Buffalo Sabres (1997–98)	3–8–3	7,555	L

November: 7–5–1 (home: 5–3–1; road: 2–2–0)

Game	Date	Score	Opponent	Record	Attendance	Recap
15	November 3, 1997	5–3	Vancouver Canucks (1997–98)	4–8–3	7,257	W
16	November 5, 1997	3–1	Detroit Red Wings (1997–98)	5–8–3	10,090	W
17	November 7, 1997	2–3	New York Islanders (1997–98)	5–9–3	7,742	L
18	November 9, 1997	4–1	Ottawa Senators (1997–98)	6–9–3	5,551	W
19	November 12, 1997	6–4	@ Edmonton Oilers (1997–98)	7–9–3	14,240	W
20	November 13, 1997	4–2	@ Calgary Flames (1997–98)	8–9–3	15,825	W
21	November 16, 1997	1–4	@ Vancouver Canucks (1997–98)	8–10–3	14,740	L
22	November 19, 1997	2–1	Montreal Canadiens (1997–98)	9–10–3	6,896	W
23	November 21, 1997	3–4	New York Rangers (1997–98)	9–11–3	19,358	L
24	November 23, 1997	3–3 OT	Calgary Flames (1997–98)	9–11–4	5,516	T
25	November 26, 1997	2–3	@ Pittsburgh Penguins (1997–98)	9–12–4	13,253	L
26	November 28, 1997	2–0	Tampa Bay Lightning (1997–98)	10–12–4	8,107	W
27	November 29, 1997	2–3	Colorado Avalanche (1997–98)	10–13–4	11,332	L

December: 5–8–1 (home: 5–3–1; road: 0–5–0)

Game	Date	Score	Opponent	Record	Attendance	Recap
28	December 1, 1997	3–1	Boston Bruins (1997–98)	11–13–4	5,865	W
29	December 3, 1997	5–3	New York Islanders (1997–98)	12–13–4	5,651	W
30	December 5, 1997	2–2 OT	Phoenix Coyotes (1997–98)	12–13–5	6,793	T
31	December 6, 1997	1–4	@ Boston Bruins (1997–98)	12–14–5	14,805	L
32	December 10, 1997	2–5	Florida Panthers (1997–98)	12–15–5	7,219	L
33	December 12, 1997	2–3 OT	@ Buffalo Sabres (1997–98)	12–16–5	12,321	L
34	December 16, 1997	2–1	Ottawa Senators (1997–98)	13–16–5	7,317	W
35	December 18, 1997	2–3	@ Ottawa Senators (1997–98)	13–17–5	14,437	L
36	December 20, 1997	1–2	Washington Capitals (1997–98)	13–18–5	8,118	L
37	December 23, 1997	2–4	@ Philadelphia Flyers (1997–98)	13–19–5	19,594	L
38	December 26, 1997	2–5	Florida Panthers (1997–98)	13–20–5	8,684	L
39	December 27, 1997	4–1	Buffalo Sabres (1997–98)	14–20–5	8,682	W
40	December 30, 1997	2–1	Mighty Ducks of Anaheim (1997–98)	15–20–5	8,309	W
41	December 31, 1997	2–3	@ Pittsburgh Penguins (1997–98)	15–21–5	15,108	L

January: 5–7–1 (home: 1–3–1; road: 4–4–0)

Game	Date	Score	Opponent	Record	Attendance	Recap
42	January 3, 1998	1–6	Dallas Stars (1997–98)	15–22–5	9,266	L
43	January 5, 1998	4–1	Ottawa Senators (1997–98)	16–22–5	6,055	W
44	January 6, 1998	2–4	@ New York Rangers (1997–98)	16–23–5	18,200	L
45	January 8, 1998	3–3 OT	Philadelphia Flyers (1997–98)	16–23–6	11,908	T
46	January 10, 1998	2–1 OT	@ New York Islanders (1997–98)	17–23–6	13,679	W
47	January 12, 1998	1–4	Pittsburgh Penguins (1997–98)	17–24–6	8,250	L
48	January 14, 1998	1–4	Chicago Blackhawks (1997–98)	17–25–6	10,704	L
49	January 21, 1998	1–2	@ Buffalo Sabres (1997–98)	17–26–6	12,627	L
50	January 22, 1998	4–2	@ Ottawa Senators (1997–98)	18–26–6	15,491	W
51	January 24, 1998	4–3	@ Montreal Canadiens (1997–98)	19–26–6	21,273	W
52	January 27, 1998	0–3	@ Florida Panthers (1997–98)	19–27–6	14,703	L
53	January 28, 1998	3–2	@ Tampa Bay Lightning (1997–98)	20–27–6	10,815	W
54	January 30, 1998	0–2	@ New York Islanders (1997–98)	20–28–6	13,275	L

February: 1–2–1 (home: 0–1–1; road: 1–1–0)

Game	Date	Score	Opponent	Record	Attendance	Recap
55	February 1, 1998	3–6	Montreal Canadiens (1997–98)	20–29–6	9,591	L
56	February 4, 1998	3–3 OT	Tampa Bay Lightning (1997–98)	20–29–7	8,304	T
57	February 7, 1998	3–1	@ Boston Bruins (1997–98)	21–29–7	16,944	W
58	February 28, 1998	3–4	@ New Jersey Devils (1997–98)	21–30–7	19,040	L

March: 8–5–1 (home: 2–3–1; road: 6–2–0)

Game	Date	Score	Opponent	Record	Attendance	Recap
59	March 2, 1998	3–1	@ San Jose Sharks (1997–98)	22–30–7	16,237	W
60	March 5, 1998	2–1	@ Los Angeles Kings (1997–98)	23–30–7	10,541	W
61	March 6, 1998	5–4 OT	@ Phoenix Coyotes (1997–98)	24–30–7	16,210	W
62	March 8, 1998	3–1	@ Mighty Ducks of Anaheim (1997–98)	25–30–7	17,174	W
63	March 12, 1998	0–2	New Jersey Devils (1997–98)	25–31–7	8,811	L
64	March 14, 1998	1–2	San Jose Sharks (1997–98)	25–32–7	12,911	L
65	March 15, 1998	4–1	Edmonton Oilers (1997–98)	26–32–7	7,853	W
66	March 18, 1998	0–1	@ Washington Capitals (1997–98)	26–33–7	12,792	L
67	March 20, 1998	1–6	@ Dallas Stars (1997–98)	26–34–7	16,928	L
68	March 23, 1998	5–3	@ Florida Panthers (1997–98)	27–34–7	14,703	W
69	March 26, 1998	4–1	New York Rangers (1997–98)	28–34–7	15,456	W
70	March 28, 1998	4–2	@ Philadelphia Flyers (1997–98)	29–34–7	19,608	W
71	March 29, 1998	1–3	Philadelphia Flyers (1997–98)	29–35–7	13,216	L
72	March 31, 1998	3–3 OT	Montreal Canadiens (1997–98)	29–35–8	8,671	T

April: 4–6–0 (home: 1–3–0; road: 3–3–0)

Game	Date	Score	Opponent	Record	Attendance	Recap
73	April 1, 1998	4–0	@ New Jersey Devils (1997–98)	30–35–8	16,338	W
74	April 4, 1998	1–0	@ Montreal Canadiens (1997–98)	31–35–8	21,273	W
75	April 6, 1998	3–0	@ Boston Bruins (1997–98)	32–35–8	15,180	W
76	April 8, 1998	1–3	@ Buffalo Sabres (1997–98)	32–36–8	16,644	L
77	April 9, 1998	5–2	Toronto Maple Leafs (1997–98)	33–36–8	8,368	W
78	April 11, 1998	1–5	@ Toronto Maple Leafs (1997–98)	33–37–8	15,726	L
79	April 13, 1998	2–3	Boston Bruins (1997–98)	33–38–8	9,228	L
80	April 16, 1998	1–4	Pittsburgh Penguins (1997–98)	33–39–8	10,515	L
81	April 18, 1998	3–4	Washington Capitals (1997–98)	33–40–8	12,641	L
82	April 19, 1998	1–2	@ Washington Capitals (1997–98)	33–41–8	18,921	L

Legend: W Win (2 points) L Loss (0 points) T Tie (1 point)

== Player statistics ==
=== Scoring ===
- Position abbreviations: C = Center; D = Defense; G = Goaltender; LW = Left wing; RW = Right wing
- † = Joined team via a transaction (e.g., trade, waivers, signing) during the season. Stats reflect time with the Hurricanes only.
- ‡ = Left team via a transaction (e.g., trade, waivers, release) during the season. Stats reflect time with the Hurricanes only.

No.	Player	Pos	Regular season					
No.	Player	Pos	GP	G	A	Pts	+/-	PIM
24	Sami Kapanen	RW	81	26	37	63	9	16
55	Keith Primeau	C	81	26	37	63	19	110
10	Gary Roberts	LW	61	20	29	49	3	103
19	Nelson Emerson	RW	81	21	24	45	−17	50
92	Jeff O'Neill	RW	74	19	20	39	−8	67
18	Robert Kron	LW	81	16	20	36	−8	12
3	Steve Chiasson	D	66	7	27	34	−2	65
23	Martin Gelinas†	LW	40	12	14	26	1	30
2	Glen Wesley	D	82	6	19	25	7	36
11	Kevin Dineen	RW	54	7	16	23	−7	105
8	Geoff Sanderson‡	LW	40	7	10	17	−4	14
28	Paul Ranheim	LW	73	5	9	14	−11	28
21	Jeff Brown‡	D	32	3	10	13	−1	16
7	Curtis Leschyshyn	D	73	2	10	12	−2	45
6	Adam Burt	D	76	1	11	12	−6	106
27	Steve Leach	RW	45	4	5	9	−19	42
44	Kent Manderville	C	77	4	4	8	−6	31
5	Kevin Haller	D	65	3	5	8	−5	94
32	Stu Grimson	LW	82	3	4	7	0	204
26	Ray Sheppard†	RW	10	4	2	6	2	2
33	Bates Battaglia	LW	33	2	4	6	−1	10
12	Steven Rice	RW	47	2	4	6	−16	38
22	Sean Hill†	D	42	0	5	5	−2	48
39	Enrico Ciccone‡	D	14	0	3	3	3	83
14	Steven Halko	D	18	0	2	2	−1	10
4	Nolan Pratt	D	23	0	2	2	−2	44
1	Sean Burke‡	G	25	0	1	1		6
1	Kirk McLean†‡	G	8	0	1	1		0
17	Chris Murray‡	RW	7	0	1	1	2	22
46	Mike Rucinski	D	9	0	1	1	0	2
29	Kevin Brown	RW	4	0	0	0	−2	0
16	Jeff Daniels	LW	2	0	0	0	0	0
30	Mike Fountain	G	3	0	0	0		2
39 (Note: Jablonski wore number 35 in his first four games.)	Pat Jablonski	G	5	0	0	0		0
37	Trevor Kidd	G	47	0	0	0		2
34	Steve Martins	C	3	0	0	0	0	0

=== Goaltending ===
- † = Joined team via a transaction (e.g., trade, waivers, signing) during the season. Stats reflect time with the Hurricanes only.
- ‡ = Left team via a transaction (e.g., trade, waivers, release) during the season. Stats reflect time with the Hurricanes only.

No.	Player	Regular season									
No.	Player	GP	W	L	T	SA	GA	GAA	SV%	SO	TOI
37	Trevor Kidd	47	21	21	3	1237	97	2.17	.922	3	2685
1	Sean Burke‡	25	7	11	5	655	66	2.80	.899	1	1415
1	Kirk McLean†‡	8	4	2	0	181	22	3.29	.878	0	401
39	Pat Jablonski	5	1	4	0	115	14	3.01	.878	0	279
30	Mike Fountain	3	0	3	0	68	10	3.68	.853	0	163

== Awards and records ==
=== Awards ===
Type	Award/honor	Recipient	Ref
League (annual)	Lester Patrick Trophy	Peter Karmanos	

=== Milestones ===
Milestone	Player	Date	Ref
First game	Steven Halko	October 1, 1997	
First game	Bates Battaglia	January 3, 1998	
First game	Mike Rucinski	March 29, 1998	

== Transactions ==
The Hurricanes were involved in the following transactions during the 1997–98 season.

=== Trades ===
June 21, 1997	To San Jose Sharks 1st round pick in 1997 - Scott Hannan	To Carolina Hurricanes 2nd round pick in 1997 - Brad DeFauw; 3rd round pick in 1998 - Erik Cole
June 27, 1997	To St. Louis Blues Alexander Godynyuk; 6th round pick in 1998 - Brad Voth	To Carolina Hurricanes Steve Leach
July 25, 1997	To Chicago Blackhawks Ryan Risidore; 5th round pick in 1998 - Morgan Warren	To Carolina Hurricanes Enrico Ciccone
August 8, 1997	To New York Rangers Jason Muzzatti	To Carolina Hurricanes 5th round pick in 1998 - Tommy Westlund
August 25, 1997	To Calgary Flames Andrew Cassels; Jean-Sebastien Giguere	To Carolina Hurricanes Gary Roberts; Trevor Kidd
November 17, 1997	To Ottawa Senators Chris Murray	To Carolina Hurricanes Sean Hill
January 2, 1998	To Toronto Maple Leafs Jeff Brown	To Carolina Hurricanes 4th round pick in 1999 - Evgeny Pavlov
January 2, 1998	To Vancouver Canucks Sean Burke; Enrico Ciccone; Geoff Sanderson	To Carolina Hurricanes Kirk McLean; Martin Gelinas
March 23, 1998	To Florida Panthers Kirk McLean	To Carolina Hurricanes Ray Sheppard

=== Free agents ===
Player	Former team
Pat Jablonski	Phoenix Coyotes
Mike Fountain	Vancouver Canucks
Greg Koehler	University of Massachusetts-Lowell (NCAA)

Player	New team
Derek King	Toronto Maple Leafs
Dave Babych	Vancouver Canucks
Bob Wren	Anaheim Mighty Ducks

== Draft picks ==
Carolina's draft picks at the 1997 NHL entry draft held at the Civic Arena in Pittsburgh, Pennsylvania.

Round	#	Player	Nationality	College/Junior/Club team (League)
1	22	Nikos Tselios	United States	Belleville Bulls (OHL)
2	28	Brad DeFauw	United States	University of North Dakota (WCHA)
3	80	Francis Lessard	Canada	Val-d'Or Foreurs (QMJHL)
4	88	Shane Willis	Canada	Lethbridge Hurricanes (WHL)
6	142	Kyle Dafoe	Canada	Owen Sound Platers (OHL)
7	169	Andrew Merrick	United States	University of Michigan (CCHA)
8	195	Niklas Nordgren	Sweden	Modo Hockey Jr. (Sweden)
8	199	Randy Fitzgerald	Canada	Detroit Whalers (OHL)
9	225	Kent McDonell	Canada	Guelph Storm (OHL)

== Farm teams ==
The Beast of New Haven were the Hurricanes American Hockey League affiliate for the 1998–99 AHL season.
