= 1997–98 Toronto Maple Leafs season =

NHL hockey team season

1997–98 Toronto Maple Leafs
- Division: 6th Central
- Conference: 12th Western
- 1997–98 record: 30–43–9
- Home record: 16–20–5
- Road record: 14–23–4
- Goals for: 194
- Goals against: 237

Team information
- General manager: Ken Dryden
- Coach: Mike Murphy
- Captain: Mats Sundin
- Alternate captains: Wendel Clark; Jamie Macoun (Oct.–Mar.); Vacant (Mar.–Apr.)
- Arena: Maple Leaf Gardens
- Average attendance: 15,707
- Minor league affiliate: St. John's Maple Leafs

Team leaders
- Goals: Mats Sundin (33)
- Assists: Mats Sundin (41)
- Points: Mats Sundin (74)
- Penalty minutes: Tie Domi (365)
- Plus/minus: Todd Warriner (+5)
- Wins: Felix Potvin (26)
- Goals against average: Felix Potvin (2.73)

The 1997–98 Toronto Maple Leafs season was Toronto's 81st season in the National Hockey League (NHL), their last full season playing at Maple Leaf Gardens, and their last season playing in the Western Conference. Just a few days before the season's start, Mats Sundin became their 17th captain and their first European captain in their 80-year history. The Maple Leafs did not qualify for the playoffs for the second consecutive season for the first time since the 1990–91 and 1991–92 seasons.

== Regular season ==
=== Final standings ===
Central Division
No.	CR		GP	W	L	T	GF	GA	Pts
1	1	**Dallas Stars**	82	49	22	11	242	167	109
2	3	**Detroit Red Wings**	82	44	23	15	250	196	103
3	4	**St. Louis Blues**	82	45	29	8	256	204	98
4	6	**Phoenix Coyotes**	82	35	35	12	224	227	82
5	9	Chicago Blackhawks	82	30	39	13	192	199	73
6	10	Toronto Maple Leafs	82	30	43	9	194	237	69

Western Conference
R		Div	GP	W	L	T	GF	GA	Pts
**1**	**p – Dallas Stars**	**CEN**	**82**	**49**	**22**	**11**	**242**	**167**	**109**
**2**	**x – Colorado Avalanche**	**PAC**	**82**	**39**	**26**	**17**	**231**	**205**	**95**
**3**	**Detroit Red Wings**	**CEN**	**82**	**44**	**23**	**15**	**250**	**196**	**103**
**4**	**St. Louis Blues**	**CEN**	**82**	**45**	**29**	**8**	**256**	**204**	**98**
**5**	**Los Angeles Kings**	**PAC**	**82**	**38**	**33**	**11**	**227**	**225**	**87**
**6**	**Phoenix Coyotes**	**CEN**	**82**	**35**	**35**	**12**	**224**	**227**	**82**
**7**	**Edmonton Oilers**	**PAC**	**82**	**35**	**37**	**10**	**215**	**224**	**80**
**8**	**San Jose Sharks**	**PAC**	**82**	**34**	**38**	**10**	**210**	**216**	**78**
9	Chicago Blackhawks	CEN	82	30	39	13	192	199	73
10	Toronto Maple Leafs	CEN	82	30	43	9	194	237	69
11	Calgary Flames	PAC	82	26	41	15	217	252	67
12	Mighty Ducks of Anaheim	PAC	82	26	43	13	205	261	65
13	Vancouver Canucks	PAC	82	25	43	14	224	273	64

Divisions: CEN – Central, PAC – Pacific

bold – Qualified for playoffs; x – Won Division; p – Won Presidents' Trophy

== Schedule and results ==
1997–98 regular season
October: 3–6–2 (home: 1–4–1; road: 2–2–1)

Game	Date	Score	Opponent	Record	Recap
1	October 1, 1997	1–4	Washington Capitals (1997–98)	0–1–0	L
2	October 4, 1997	0–3	@ New York Islanders (1997–98)	0–2–0	L
3	October 7, 1997	2–1	@ Calgary Flames (1997–98)	1–2–0	W
4	October 9, 1997	2–2 OT	@ Vancouver Canucks (1997–98)	1–2–1	T
5	October 11, 1997	1–2	@ Edmonton Oilers (1997–98)	1–3–1	L
6	October 14, 1997	2–3	Detroit Red Wings (1997–98)	1–4–1	L
7	October 15, 1997	4–3	@ Detroit Red Wings (1997–98)	2–4–1	W
8	October 18, 1997	4–5	Dallas Stars (1997–98)	2–5–1	L
9	October 22, 1997	2–6	Ottawa Senators (1997–98)	2–6–1	L
10	October 25, 1997	4–3	Calgary Flames (1997–98)	3–6–1	W
11	October 28, 1997	2–2 OT	Mighty Ducks of Anaheim (1997–98)	3–6–2	T

November: 5–7–1 (home: 3–4–0; road: 2–3–1)

Game	Date	Score	Opponent	Record	Recap
12	November 1, 1997	1–5	@ Montreal Canadiens (1997–98)	3–7–2	L
13	November 4, 1997	0–0 OT	@ San Jose Sharks (1997–98)	3–7–3	T
14	November 5, 1997	4–3	@ Calgary Flames (1997–98)	4–7–3	W
15	November 8, 1997	0–3	Phoenix Coyotes (1997–98)	4–8–3	L
16	November 11, 1997	5–2	Chicago Blackhawks (1997–98)	5–8–3	W
17	November 13, 1997	2–1	@ Chicago Blackhawks (1997–98)	6–8–3	W
18	November 15, 1997	0–5	Pittsburgh Penguins (1997–98)	6–9–3	L
19	November 17, 1997	2–3	St. Louis Blues (1997–98)	6–10–3	L
20	November 19, 1997	3–1	Philadelphia Flyers (1997–98)	7–10–3	W
21	November 21, 1997	1–3	@ Colorado Avalanche (1997–98)	7–11–3	L
22	November 22, 1997	0–2	@ Phoenix Coyotes (1997–98)	7–12–3	L
23	November 25, 1997	3–1	San Jose Sharks (1997–98)	8–12–3	W
24	November 29, 1997	2–4	Vancouver Canucks (1997–98)	8–13–3	L

December: 5–6–3 (home: 3–2–3; road: 2–4–0)

Game	Date	Score	Opponent	Record	Recap
25	December 2, 1997	3–3 OT	Mighty Ducks of Anaheim (1997–98)	8–13–4	T
26	December 4, 1997	3–4	@ St. Louis Blues (1997–98)	8–14–4	L
27	December 6, 1997	7–2	Los Angeles Kings (1997–98)	9–14–4	W
28	December 8, 1997	3–0	Dallas Stars (1997–98)	10–14–4	W
29	December 10, 1997	2–2 OT	Colorado Avalanche (1997–98)	10–14–5	T
30	December 13, 1997	0–3	New Jersey Devils (1997–98)	10–15–5	L
31	December 15, 1997	2–3	@ Colorado Avalanche (1997–98)	10–16–5	L
32	December 17, 1997	6–2	@ Mighty Ducks of Anaheim (1997–98)	11–16–5	W
33	December 18, 1997	2–5	@ Los Angeles Kings (1997–98)	11–17–5	L
34	December 20, 1997	3–2	@ Phoenix Coyotes (1997–98)	12–17–5	W
35	December 23, 1997	5–4	Edmonton Oilers (1997–98)	13–17–5	W
36	December 26, 1997	1–4	@ Detroit Red Wings (1997–98)	13–18–5	L
37	December 27, 1997	1–8	Detroit Red Wings (1997–98)	13–19–5	L
38	December 31, 1997	2–2 OT	Boston Bruins (1997–98)	13–19–6	T

January: 4–8–1 (home: 1–3–0; road: 3–5–1)

Game	Date	Score	Opponent	Record	Recap
39	January 1, 1998	3–3 OT	@ Chicago Blackhawks (1997–98)	13–19–7	T
40	January 3, 1998	2–4	@ New Jersey Devils (1997–98)	13–20–7	L
41	January 6, 1998	3–5	@ Washington Capitals (1997–98)	13–21–7	L
42	January 7, 1998	5–2	@ Tampa Bay Lightning (1997–98)	14–21–7	W
43	January 10, 1998	3–4	Chicago Blackhawks (1997–98)	14–22–7	L
44	January 12, 1998	2–3	@ New York Rangers (1997–98)	14–23–7	L
45	January 14, 1998	1–4	Buffalo Sabres (1997–98)	14–24–7	L
46	January 21, 1998	3–0	@ Detroit Red Wings (1997–98)	15–24–7	W
47	January 22, 1998	3–0	@ Chicago Blackhawks (1997–98)	16–24–7	W
48	January 24, 1998	5–2	Tampa Bay Lightning (1997–98)	17–24–7	W
49	January 26, 1998	1–5	@ Dallas Stars (1997–98)	17–25–7	L
50	January 29, 1998	0–2	@ St. Louis Blues (1997–98)	17–26–7	L
51	January 31, 1998	2–5	Phoenix Coyotes (1997–98)	17–27–7	L

February: 3–3–1 (home: 3–2–0; road: 0–1–1)

Game	Date	Score	Opponent	Record	Recap
52	February 2, 1998	1–5	Dallas Stars (1997–98)	17–28–7	L
53	February 4, 1998	3–2	St. Louis Blues (1997–98)	18–28–7	W
54	February 5, 1998	2–3	@ Ottawa Senators (1997–98)	18–29–7	L
55	February 7, 1998	3–2	Florida Panthers (1997–98)	19–29–7	W
56	February 25, 1998	2–2 OT	@ Buffalo Sabres (1997–98)	19–29–8	T
57	February 26, 1998	2–5	New York Rangers (1997–98)	19–30–8	L
58	February 28, 1998	4–0	Montreal Canadiens (1997–98)	20–30–8	W

March: 6–8–1 (home: 3–3–1; road: 3–5–0)

Game	Date	Score	Opponent	Record	Recap
59	March 2, 1998	1–3	@ Pittsburgh Penguins (1997–98)	20–31–8	L
60	March 4, 1998	3–5	Colorado Avalanche (1997–98)	20–32–8	L
61	March 7, 1998	4–1	Edmonton Oilers (1997–98)	21–32–8	W
62	March 9, 1998	2–3	@ San Jose Sharks (1997–98)	21–33–8	L
63	March 11, 1998	3–1	@ Mighty Ducks of Anaheim (1997–98)	22–33–8	W
64	March 12, 1998	2–1	@ Los Angeles Kings (1997–98)	23–33–8	W
65	March 14, 1998	2–1	Calgary Flames (1997–98)	24–33–8	W
66	March 16, 1998	1–4	@ Philadelphia Flyers (1997–98)	24–34–8	L
67	March 18, 1998	2–5	Detroit Red Wings (1997–98)	24–35–8	L
68	March 19, 1998	0–4	@ Boston Bruins (1997–98)	24–36–8	L
69	March 21, 1998	1–1 OT	Vancouver Canucks (1997–98)	24–36–9	T
70	March 24, 1998	2–4	@ Phoenix Coyotes (1997–98)	24–37–9	L
71	March 26, 1998	1–0	@ Dallas Stars (1997–98)	25–37–9	W
72	March 28, 1998	4–3 OT	New York Islanders (1997–98)	26–37–9	W
73	March 30, 1998	2–3	Los Angeles Kings (1997–98)	26–38–9	L

April: 4–5–0 (home: 2–2–0; road: 2–3–0)

Game	Date	Score	Opponent	Record	Recap
74	April 1, 1998	4–6	St. Louis Blues (1997–98)	26–39–9	L
75	April 4, 1998	3–5	San Jose Sharks (1997–98)	26–40–9	L
76	April 6, 1998	2–4	@ Dallas Stars (1997–98)	26–41–9	L
77	April 7, 1998	3–1	@ Florida Panthers (1997–98)	27–41–9	W
78	April 9, 1998	2–5	@ Carolina Hurricanes (1997–98)	27–42–9	L
79	April 11, 1998	5–1	Carolina Hurricanes (1997–98)	28–42–9	W
80	April 15, 1998	3–2	Chicago Blackhawks (1997–98)	29–42–9	W
81	April 18, 1998	3–4	@ Edmonton Oilers (1997–98)	29–43–9	L
82	April 19, 1998	2–1	@ Vancouver Canucks (1997–98)	30–43–9	W

Legend: W Win (2 points) L Loss (0 points) T Tie (1 point)

== Player statistics ==
=== Scoring ===
- Position abbreviations: C = Centre; D = Defence; G = Goaltender; LW = Left wing; RW = Right wing
- † = Joined team via a transaction (e.g., trade, waivers, signing) during the season. Stats reflect time with the Maple Leafs only.
- ‡ = Left team via a transaction (e.g., trade, waivers, release) during the season. Stats reflect time with the Maple Leafs only.

No.	Player	Pos	Regular season					
No.	Player	Pos	GP	G	A	Pts	+/-	PIM
13	Mats Sundin	C	82	33	41	74	−3	49
20	Mike Johnson	RW	82	15	32	47	−4	24
7	Derek King	LW	77	21	25	46	−7	43
22	Igor Korolev	RW	78	17	22	39	−18	22
72	Mathieu Schneider	D	76	11	26	37	−12	44
19	Fredrik Modin	RW	74	16	16	32	−5	32
94	Sergei Berezin	LW	68	16	15	31	−3	10
11	Steve Sullivan	C	63	10	18	28	−8	40
17	Wendel Clark	LW	47	12	7	19	−21	80
18	Alyn McCauley	C	60	6	10	16	−7	6
25	Jason Smith	D	81	3	13	16	−5	100
28	Tie Domi	RW	80	4	10	14	−5	365
8	Todd Warriner	LW	45	5	8	13	5	20
14	Darby Hendrickson	C	80	8	4	12	−20	67
36	Dmitri Yushkevich	D	72	0	12	12	−13	78
3	Sylvain Cote†	D	12	3	6	9	2	6
33	Jeff Brown†‡	D	19	1	8	9	2	10
55	Danny Markov	D	25	2	5	7	0	28
34	Jamie Macoun‡	D	67	0	7	7	−17	63
2	Rob Zettler	D	59	0	7	7	−8	108
16	Lonny Bohonos†	RW	6	3	3	6	1	4
12	Kris King	LW	82	3	3	6	−13	199
21	Martin Prochazka	LW	29	2	4	6	−1	8
38	Yannick Tremblay	D	38	2	4	6	−6	6
24	Per Gustafsson‡	D	22	1	4	5	−5	10
16	Jamie Baker	C	13	0	5	5	1	10
33	David Cooper	D	9	0	4	4	2	8
39	Mike Kennedy‡	RW	13	0	1	1	−2	14
42	Kevyn Adams	C	5	0	0	0	0	7
31	Marcel Cousineau	G	2	0	0	0		0
30	Glenn Healy	G	21	0	0	0		0
29	Felix Potvin	G	67	0	0	0		8
23	Jeff Ware	D	2	0	0	0	1	0
26	Craig Wolanin	D	10	0	0	0	−9	6

=== Goaltending ===
No.	Player	Regular season									
No.	Player	GP	W	L	T	SA	GA	GAA	SV%	SO	TOI
29	Felix Potvin	67	26	33	7	1882	176	2.73	.906	5	3864
30	Glenn Healy	21	4	10	2	453	53	2.98	.883	0	1068
31	Marcel Cousineau	2	0	0	0	9	0	0.00	1.000	0	17

== Awards and records ==
=== Awards ===
Type	Award/honour	Recipient	Ref
League (annual)	NHL All-Rookie Team	Mike Johnson (Forward)	
League (in-season)	NHL All-Star Game selection	Mats Sundin	
League (in-season)	NHL Rookie of the Month	Mike Johnson (December)	
Team	Molson Cup	Felix Potvin	

=== Milestones ===
Milestone	Player	Date	Ref
First game	Kevyn Adams	October 1, 1997	
First game	Alyn McCauley	October 1, 1997	
First game	Martin Prochazka	October 9, 1997	
First game	Danny Markov	February 2, 1998	
1,000th game played	Jamie Macoun	November 8, 1997	

== Transactions ==
The Maple Leafs were involved in the following transactions during the 1997–98 season.

=== Trades ===
September 30, 1997	To St. Louis Blues Kelly Chase	To Toronto Maple Leafs Future Considerations
January 2, 1998	To Carolina Hurricanes 4th-round pick in 1999 – Yevgeny Pavlov	To Toronto Maple Leafs Jeff Brown
March 7, 1998	To Vancouver Canucks Brandon Convery	To Toronto Maple Leafs Lonny Bohonos
March 17, 1998	To Ottawa Senators Per Gustafsson	To Toronto Maple Leafs 8th-round pick in 1998 – Dwight Wolfe
March 24, 1998	To Dallas Stars Mike Kennedy	To Toronto Maple Leafs 8th-round pick in 1998 – Michal Travnicek
March 24, 1998	To Detroit Red Wings Jamie Macoun	To Toronto Maple Leafs 4th-round pick in 1998 – Alexei Ponikarovsky
March 24, 1998	To Washington Capitals Jeff Brown	To Toronto Maple Leafs Sylvain Cote
June 27, 1998	To Chicago Blackhawks 1st-round pick in 1998 – Mark Bell; 4th-round pick in 1998 – Matthias Trattnig	To Toronto Maple Leafs 1st-round pick in 1998 – Nik Antropov; 3rd-round pick in 1998 – Jamie Hodson; 5th-round pick in 1998 – Morgan Warren

=== Expansion draft ===
June 26, 1998	To Nashville Predators Rob Zettler

=== Free agents ===
Player	Former team
Mike Kennedy	Dallas Stars
Derek King	Hartford Whalers
Kris King	Phoenix Coyotes
Glenn Healy	New York Rangers
Kevyn Adams	Grand Rapids Griffins (IHL)
Igor Korolev	Phoenix Coyotes

Player	New team
Jamie Heward	Philadelphia Flyers
Mike Craig	San Jose Sharks

== Draft picks ==
Toronto's picks at the 1997 NHL entry draft in Pittsburgh, Pennsylvania.

Round	#	Player	Nationality	College/Junior/Club team
3	57	Jeff Farkas (Centre)	United States	Boston College (Hockey East)
4	84	Adam Mair (Right wing)	Canada	Owen Sound Platers (OHL)
5	111	Frantisek Mrazek (Left wing)	Czech Republic	HC České Budějovice (Czech Republic)
6	138	Eric Gooldy (Left wing)	United States	Detroit Whalers (OHL)
7	165	Hugo Marchand (Defence)	Canada	Victoriaville Tigres (QMJHL)
7	190	Shawn Thornton (Right wing)	Canada	Peterborough Petes (OHL)
8	194	Russ Bartlett (Centre)	United States	Phillips Exeter Academy (USHS-NH)
9	221	Jonathan Hedstrom (Left wing)	Sweden	Skellefteå AIK (Sweden)

== Farm teams ==
- The Maple Leafs farm team was the St. John's Maple Leafs in St. John's, Newfoundland.
