= 1997–98 Phoenix Coyotes season =

NHL hockey team season

1997–98 Phoenix Coyotes
- Division: 4th Central
- Conference: 7th Western
- 1997–98 record: 35–35–12
- Home record: 19–16–6
- Road record: 16–19–6
- Goals for: 224
- Goals against: 227

Team information
- General manager: Bobby Smith
- Coach: Jim Schoenfeld
- Captain: Keith Tkachuk
- Arena: America West Arena
- Average attendance: 15,404
- Minor league affiliates: Springfield Falcons; Mississippi Sea Wolves

Team leaders
- Goals: Keith Tkachuk (40)
- Assists: Cliff Ronning (44)
- Points: Keith Tkachuk (66)
- Penalty minutes: Rick Tocchet (157)
- Plus/minus: Teppo Numminen (+25)
- Wins: Nikolai Khabibulin (30)
- Goals against average: Jimmy Waite (2.12)

The 1997–98 Phoenix Coyotes season was the Coyotes' second season in Phoenix, the franchise's 19th season in the NHL, its second season in Phoenix, and its 26th season overall. The Coyotes made the 1998 Stanley Cup playoffs, losing in the first round to the eventual Stanley Cup champion Detroit Red Wings.

This was the team's final season of its original tenure in the Central Division, which it had joined while still based in Winnipeg, before being realigned into the Pacific Division the following season. The Coyotes would return to the Central in 2021.

== Regular season ==
=== Final standings ===
Central Division
No.	CR		GP	W	L	T	GF	GA	Pts
1	1	**Dallas Stars**	82	49	22	11	242	167	109
2	3	**Detroit Red Wings**	82	44	23	15	250	196	103
3	4	**St. Louis Blues**	82	45	29	8	256	204	98
4	6	**Phoenix Coyotes**	82	35	35	12	224	227	82
5	9	Chicago Blackhawks	82	30	39	13	192	199	73
6	10	Toronto Maple Leafs	82	30	43	9	194	237	69

Western Conference
R		Div	GP	W	L	T	GF	GA	Pts
**1**	**p – Dallas Stars**	**CEN**	**82**	**49**	**22**	**11**	**242**	**167**	**109**
**2**	**x – Colorado Avalanche**	**PAC**	**82**	**39**	**26**	**17**	**231**	**205**	**95**
**3**	**Detroit Red Wings**	**CEN**	**82**	**44**	**23**	**15**	**250**	**196**	**103**
**4**	**St. Louis Blues**	**CEN**	**82**	**45**	**29**	**8**	**256**	**204**	**98**
**5**	**Los Angeles Kings**	**PAC**	**82**	**38**	**33**	**11**	**227**	**225**	**87**
**6**	**Phoenix Coyotes**	**CEN**	**82**	**35**	**35**	**12**	**224**	**227**	**82**
**7**	**Edmonton Oilers**	**PAC**	**82**	**35**	**37**	**10**	**215**	**224**	**80**
**8**	**San Jose Sharks**	**PAC**	**82**	**34**	**38**	**10**	**210**	**216**	**78**
9	Chicago Blackhawks	CEN	82	30	39	13	192	199	73
10	Toronto Maple Leafs	CEN	82	30	43	9	194	237	69
11	Calgary Flames	PAC	82	26	41	15	217	252	67
12	Mighty Ducks of Anaheim	PAC	82	26	43	13	205	261	65
13	Vancouver Canucks	PAC	82	25	43	14	224	273	64

Divisions: CEN – Central, PAC – Pacific

bold – Qualified for playoffs; x – Won Division; p – Won Presidents' Trophy

== Playoffs ==
The series began in Detroit. In Game 1, Detroit won 6–3, but in Game 2, the Coyotes came back and won 7–4. The series then shifted to Phoenix, where the Coyotes were victorious in Game 3, 3–2. However, the Coyotes' 2–1 series lead was short lived, as Detroit won 4–2 in Game 4. For Game 5 back in Detroit, the Red Wings won 3–1. In Game 6, the series went back to Phoenix, where Detroit won the game 5–2 and the series 4–2.

== Schedule and results ==
=== Regular season ===
1997–98 regular season
October: 5–5–2 (home: 4–2–1; road: 1–3–1)

Game	Date	Score	Opponent	Record	Recap
1	October 1, 1997	6–2	Chicago Blackhawks (1997–98)	1–0–0	W
2	October 3, 1997	2–7	@ St. Louis Blues (1997–98)	1–1–0	L
3	October 5, 1997	2–1	@ Philadelphia Flyers (1997–98)	2–1–0	W
4	October 8, 1997	2–3 OT	Boston Bruins (1997–98)	2–2–0	L
5	October 11, 1997	3–3 OT	@ Colorado Avalanche (1997–98)	2–2–1	T
6	October 13, 1997	2–1	Chicago Blackhawks (1997–98)	3–2–1	W
7	October 19, 1997	5–3	San Jose Sharks (1997–98)	4–2–1	W
8	October 21, 1997	3–4	Mighty Ducks of Anaheim (1997–98)	4–3–1	L
9	October 23, 1997	3–3 OT	Washington Capitals (1997–98)	4–3–2	T
10	October 26, 1997	6–1	Buffalo Sabres (1997–98)	5–3–2	W
11	October 29, 1997	2–3	@ Edmonton Oilers (1997–98)	5–4–2	L
12	October 30, 1997	2–4	@ Calgary Flames (1997–98)	5–5–2	L

November: 7–6–0 (home: 5–2–0; road: 2–4–0)

Game	Date	Score	Opponent	Record	Recap
13	November 2, 1997	3–1	Calgary Flames (1997–98)	6–5–2	W
14	November 5, 1997	2–4	@ Montreal Canadiens (1997–98)	6–6–2	L
15	November 6, 1997	1–4	@ Ottawa Senators (1997–98)	6–7–2	L
16	November 8, 1997	3–0	@ Toronto Maple Leafs (1997–98)	7–7–2	W
17	November 11, 1997	5–2	Tampa Bay Lightning (1997–98)	8–7–2	W
18	November 13, 1997	2–5	Montreal Canadiens (1997–98)	8–8–2	L
19	November 15, 1997	3–2	@ San Jose Sharks (1997–98)	9–8–2	W
20	November 17, 1997	6–3	Edmonton Oilers (1997–98)	10–8–2	W
21	November 20, 1997	2–4	@ Vancouver Canucks (1997–98)	10–9–2	L
22	November 22, 1997	2–0	Toronto Maple Leafs (1997–98)	11–9–2	W
23	November 25, 1997	3–2	St. Louis Blues (1997–98)	12–9–2	W
24	November 27, 1997	1–4	Dallas Stars (1997–98)	12–10–2	L
25	November 29, 1997	2–5	@ Dallas Stars (1997–98)	12–11–2	L

December: 5–5–5 (home: 0–2–3; road: 5–3–2)

Game	Date	Score	Opponent	Record	Recap
26	December 1, 1997	3–2	@ Florida Panthers (1997–98)	13–11–2	W
27	December 3, 1997	1–2	@ Tampa Bay Lightning (1997–98)	13–12–2	L
28	December 5, 1997	2–2 OT	@ Carolina Hurricanes (1997–98)	13–12–3	T
29	December 6, 1997	0–4	@ New York Islanders (1997–98)	13–13–3	L
30	December 8, 1997	1–3	@ New York Rangers (1997–98)	13–14–3	L
31	December 10, 1997	3–3 OT	@ Chicago Blackhawks (1997–98)	13–14–4	T
32	December 12, 1997	2–2 OT	Pittsburgh Penguins (1997–98)	13–14–5	T
33	December 14, 1997	3–3 OT	Detroit Red Wings (1997–98)	13–14–6	T
34	December 17, 1997	1–5	Vancouver Canucks (1997–98)	13–15–6	L
35	December 19, 1997	6–2	@ Mighty Ducks of Anaheim (1997–98)	14–15–6	W
36	December 20, 1997	2–3	Toronto Maple Leafs (1997–98)	14–16–6	L
37	December 23, 1997	2–2 OT	Calgary Flames (1997–98)	14–16–7	T
38	December 26, 1997	4–0	@ San Jose Sharks (1997–98)	15–16–7	W
39	December 27, 1997	4–2	@ Los Angeles Kings (1997–98)	16–16–7	W
40	December 29, 1997	5–3	@ Calgary Flames (1997–98)	17–16–7	W

January: 7–4–3 (home: 4–1–1; road: 3–3–2)

Game	Date	Score	Opponent	Record	Recap
41	January 1, 1998	4–0	Los Angeles Kings (1997–98)	18–16–7	W
42	January 3, 1998	2–1	New York Islanders (1997–98)	19–16–7	W
43	January 6, 1998	0–2	@ Detroit Red Wings (1997–98)	19–17–7	L
44	January 8, 1998	2–5	@ Boston Bruins (1997–98)	19–18–7	L
45	January 9, 1998	4–2	@ Chicago Blackhawks (1997–98)	20–18–7	W
46	January 11, 1998	4–4 OT	Ottawa Senators (1997–98)	20–18–8	T
47	January 14, 1998	3–2	Florida Panthers (1997–98)	21–18–8	W
48	January 20, 1998	2–6	@ Edmonton Oilers (1997–98)	21–19–8	L
49	January 21, 1998	6–1	@ Vancouver Canucks (1997–98)	22–19–8	W
50	January 24, 1998	2–5	Edmonton Oilers (1997–98)	22–20–8	L
51	January 26, 1998	4–2	Vancouver Canucks (1997–98)	23–20–8	W
52	January 28, 1998	4–4 OT	@ Detroit Red Wings (1997–98)	23–20–9	T
53	January 30, 1998	3–3 OT	@ Buffalo Sabres (1997–98)	23–20–10	T
54	January 31, 1998	5–2	@ Toronto Maple Leafs (1997–98)	24–20–10	W

February: 0–5–1 (home: 0–3–1; road: 0–2–0)

Game	Date	Score	Opponent	Record	Recap
55	February 3, 1998	2–4	Chicago Blackhawks (1997–98)	24–21–10	L
56	February 5, 1998	2–6	Philadelphia Flyers (1997–98)	24–22–10	L
57	February 7, 1998	1–1 OT	New York Rangers (1997–98)	24–22–11	T
58	February 25, 1998	2–4	Colorado Avalanche (1997–98)	24–23–11	L
59	February 26, 1998	0–3	@ Colorado Avalanche (1997–98)	24–24–11	L
60	February 28, 1998	0–4	@ Dallas Stars (1997–98)	24–25–11	L

March: 4–7–1 (home: 3–5–0; road: 1–2–1)

Game	Date	Score	Opponent	Record	Recap
61	March 2, 1998	1–3	Detroit Red Wings (1997–98)	24–26–11	L
62	March 6, 1998	4–5 OT	Carolina Hurricanes (1997–98)	24–27–11	L
63	March 8, 1998	1–1 OT	@ Dallas Stars (1997–98)	24–27–12	T
64	March 10, 1998	3–4	Los Angeles Kings (1997–98)	24–28–12	L
65	March 12, 1998	5–4	Dallas Stars (1997–98)	25–28–12	W
66	March 14, 1998	2–0	@ St. Louis Blues (1997–98)	26–28–12	W
67	March 16, 1998	1–2	@ Washington Capitals (1997–98)	26–29–12	L
68	March 19, 1998	3–4	Colorado Avalanche (1997–98)	26–30–12	L
69	March 21, 1998	2–3	@ Los Angeles Kings (1997–98)	26–31–12	L
70	March 22, 1998	3–1	San Jose Sharks (1997–98)	27–31–12	W
71	March 24, 1998	4–2	Toronto Maple Leafs (1997–98)	28–31–12	W
72	March 28, 1998	0–3	New Jersey Devils (1997–98)	28–32–12	L

April: 7–3–0 (home: 3–1–0; road: 4–2–0)

Game	Date	Score	Opponent	Record	Recap
73	April 1, 1998	5–1	@ Mighty Ducks of Anaheim (1997–98)	29–32–12	W
74	April 3, 1998	6–3	Mighty Ducks of Anaheim (1997–98)	30–32–12	W
75	April 5, 1998	2–3	@ New Jersey Devils (1997–98)	30–33–12	L
76	April 7, 1998	2–1	@ Pittsburgh Penguins (1997–98)	31–33–12	W
77	April 9, 1998	1–5	@ Detroit Red Wings (1997–98)	31–34–12	L
78	April 11, 1998	4–3	@ St. Louis Blues (1997–98)	32–34–12	W
79	April 12, 1998	2–1	@ Chicago Blackhawks (1997–98)	33–34–12	W
80	April 14, 1998	2–1	Detroit Red Wings (1997–98)	34–34–12	W
81	April 16, 1998	3–2	Dallas Stars (1997–98)	35–34–12	W
82	April 18, 1998	4–5	St. Louis Blues (1997–98)	35–35–12	L

Legend: W Win (2 points) L Loss (0 points) T Tie (1 point)

=== Playoffs ===
1998 Stanley Cup playoffs
Western Conference Quarterfinals vs. (3) Detroit Red Wings – Red Wings win 4–2

Game	Date	Score	Opponent	Series	Recap
1	April 22, 1998	3–6	@ Detroit Red Wings	Red Wings lead 1–0	L
2	April 24, 1998	7–4	@ Detroit Red Wings	Series tied 1–1	W
3	April 26, 1998	3–2	Detroit Red Wings	Coyotes lead 2–1	W
4	April 28, 1998	2–4	Detroit Red Wings	Series tied 2–2	L
5	April 30, 1998	1–3	@ Detroit Red Wings	Red Wings lead 3–2	L
6	May 3, 1998	2–5	Detroit Red Wings	Red Wings win 4–2	L

Legend: W Win L Loss

== Player statistics ==
=== Scoring ===
- Position abbreviations: C = Center; D = Defense; G = Goaltender; LW = Left wing; RW = Right wing
- † = Joined team via a transaction (e.g., trade, waivers, signing) during the season. Stats reflect time with the Coyotes only.
- ‡ = Left team via a transaction (e.g., trade, waivers, release) during the season. Stats reflect time with the Coyotes only.

No.	Player	Pos	Regular season						Playoffs					
No.	Player	Pos	GP	G	A	Pts	+/-	PIM	GP	G	A	Pts	+/-	PIM
7	Keith Tkachuk	LW	69	40	26	66	9	147	6	3	3	6	−1	10
97	Jeremy Roenick	C	79	24	32	56	5	103	6	5	3	8	−1	4
77	Cliff Ronning	C	80	11	44	55	5	36	6	1	3	4	−1	4
15	Craig Janney	C	68	10	43	53	5	12	6	0	3	3	−2	0
27	Teppo Numminen	D	82	11	40	51	25	30	1	0	0	0	0	0
92	Rick Tocchet	RW	68	26	19	45	1	157	6	6	2	8	0	25
11	Dallas Drake	RW	60	11	29	40	17	71	4	0	1	1	−4	2
22	Mike Gartner	RW	60	12	15	27	−4	24	5	1	0	1	−2	18
21	Bob Corkum	C	76	12	9	21	−7	28	6	1	0	1	−3	4
10	Oleg Tverdovsky	D	46	7	12	19	1	12	6	0	7	7	−2	0
4	Gerald Diduck	D	78	8	10	18	14	118	6	0	2	2	−4	20
16	Brad Isbister	LW	66	9	8	17	4	102	5	0	0	0	−1	2
26	John Slaney	D	55	3	14	17	−3	24	—	—	—	—	—	—
34	Darrin Shannon	LW	58	2	12	14	4	26	5	0	1	1	−1	4
36	Juha Ylonen	C	55	1	11	12	−3	10	—	—	—	—	—	—
19	Shane Doan	RW	33	5	6	11	−3	35	6	1	0	1	−2	6
5	Deron Quint	D	32	4	7	11	−6	16	—	—	—	—	—	—
6	Jay More‡	D	41	5	5	10	0	53	—	—	—	—	—	—
14	Mike Stapleton	C	64	5	5	10	−4	36	6	0	0	0	0	2
44	Norm Maciver	D	41	2	6	8	−11	38	6	0	1	1	0	2
33	Jim McKenzie	LW	64	3	4	7	−7	146	1	0	0	0	0	0
3	Keith Carney†	D	20	1	6	7	5	18	6	0	0	0	−3	4
24	Michel Petit†	D	32	4	2	6	−4	77	5	0	0	0	−1	8
32	Jocelyn Lemieux	RW	30	3	3	6	0	27	—	—	—	—	—	—
2	Murray Baron	D	45	1	5	6	−10	106	6	0	2	2	2	6
8	Jim Johnson	D	16	2	1	3	0	18	—	—	—	—	—	—
18	Mark Janssens†	C	7	1	2	3	4	4	1	0	0	0	0	2
35	Nikolai Khabibulin	G	70	0	2	2		22	4	0	1	1		0
54	Daniel Briere	C	5	1	0	1	1	2	—	—	—	—	—	—
55	Jason Doig	D	4	0	1	1	−4	12	—	—	—	—	—	—
48	Sean Gagnon	D	5	0	1	1	1	14	—	—	—	—	—	—
18	Chad Kilger‡	LW	10	0	1	1	−2	4	—	—	—	—	—	—
72	Jeff Christian	LW	1	0	0	0	−1	0	—	—	—	—	—	—
20	Jim Cummins†	RW	20	0	0	0	−7	47	3	0	0	0	0	4
31	Scott Langkow	G	3	0	0	0		0	—	—	—	—	—	—
29	Scott Levins	RW	2	0	0	0	−1	5	—	—	—	—	—	—
39	Brad Tiley	D	1	0	0	0	1	0	—	—	—	—	—	—
28	Jimmy Waite	G	17	0	0	0		2	4	0	0	0		0

=== Goaltending ===
No.	Player	Regular season										Playoffs								
No.	Player	GP	W	L	T	SA	GA	GAA	SV%	SO	TOI	GP	W	L	SA	GA	GAA	SV%	SO	TOI
35	Nikolai Khabibulin	70	30	28	10	1835	184	2.74	.900	4	4026	4	2	1	106	13	4.21	.877	0	185
28	Jimmy Waite	17	5	6	1	322	28	2.12	.913	1	793	4	0	3	97	11	3.85	.887	0	171
31	Scott Langkow	3	0	1	1	60	10	4.39	.833	0	137	—	—	—	—	—	—	—	—	—

== Awards and records ==
=== Awards ===
Type	Award/honor	Recipient	Ref
League (annual)	NHL Second All-Star Team	Keith Tkachuk (Left wing)	
League (in-season)	NHL All-Star Game selection	Nikolai Khabibulin	
League (in-season)	NHL All-Star Game selection	Keith Tkachuk	
Team	Hardest Working Player Award	Dallas Drake	
Team	Leading Scorer Award	Keith Tkachuk	
Team	Man of the Year Award	Jim McKenzie	
Team	Team MVP Award	Keith Tkachuk	
Team	Three-Star Award	Keith Tkachuk	

=== Milestones ===
Milestone	Player	Date	Ref
First game	Brad Isbister	October 1, 1997	
First game	Sean Gagnon	November 8, 1997	
First game	Brad Tiley	December 5, 1997	
First game	Daniel Briere	March 19, 1998	

== Transactions ==
=== Trades ===
March 4, 1998	To Chicago Blackhawks Chad Kilger; Jay More	To Phoenix Coyotes Keith Carney; Jim Cummins
March 24, 1998	To New York Islanders 9th round pick in 1998 (Jason Doyle)	To Phoenix Coyotes Mark Janssens
June 11, 1998	To Tampa Bay Lightning Craig Janney	To Phoenix Coyotes Louie DeBrusk; 5th round pick in 1998 (Jay Leach)
June 18, 1998	To Mighty Ducks of Anaheim Jim McKenzie	To Phoenix Coyotes Jean-Francois Jomphe
June 27, 1998	To San Jose Sharks 5th round pick in 1999 (Marc-Andre Thinel)	To Phoenix Coyotes 5th round pick in 1998 (Josh Blackburn)

=== Waivers ===
September 28, 1997	From Chicago Blackhawks Jimmy Waite

=== Free agents ===
Player	Former team
Ted Crowley	Boston Bruins
Rick Tocchet	Washington Capitals
Darin Kimble	New Jersey Devils
Jeff Christian	Pittsburgh Penguins
Martin Simard	Colorado Avalanche
John Slaney	Los Angeles Kings
Brad Tiley	Los Angeles Kings
Radoslav Suchy	Undrafted Free Agent
Michel Petit	Philadelphia Flyers

Player	New team
Kris King	Toronto Maple Leafs
Jeff Finley	New York Rangers
Pat Jablonski	Carolina Hurricanes
Brent Thompson	New York Rangers
Kevin Dahl	Calgary Flames
Igor Korolev	Toronto Maple Leafs

== Draft picks ==
Phoenix's draft picks at the 1997 NHL entry draft held at the Civic Arena in Pittsburgh, Pennsylvania.

Round	#	Player	Nationality	College/Junior/Club team (League)
2	43	Juha Gustafsson	Finland	Kiekko-Espoo (Finland)
4	96	Scott McCallum	Canada	Tri-City Americans (WHL)
5	123	Curtis Suter	Canada	Spokane Chiefs (WHL)
6	151	Robert Francz	Germany	Peterborough Petes (OHL)
8	207	Aleksandrs Andrejevs	Latvia	Weyburn Red Wings (SJHL)
9	233	Wyatt Smith	United States	University of Minnesota (WCHA)

== See also ==
- 1997–98 NHL season
