= 1997–98 Calgary Flames season =

NHL team season

1997–98 Calgary Flames
- Division: 5th Pacific
- Conference: 11th Western
- 1997–98 record: 26–41–15
- Home record: 18–17–6
- Road record: 8–24–9
- Goals for: 217
- Goals against: 252

Team information
- General manager: Al Coates
- Coach: Brian Sutter
- Captain: Todd Simpson
- Alternate captains: Theoren Fleury; Andrew Cassels
- Arena: Canadian Airlines Saddledome
- Average attendance: 16,940
- Minor league affiliates: Saint John Flames; Roanoke Express

Team leaders
- Goals: Theoren Fleury (27); Cory Stillman (27)
- Assists: Theoren Fleury (51)
- Points: Theoren Fleury (78)
- Penalty minutes: Theoren Fleury (197)
- Plus/minus: Jim Dowd (+10); Michael Nylander (+10)
- Wins: Rick Tabaracci (13)
- Goals against average: Rick Tabaracci (2.88)

The 1997–98 Calgary Flames season was the 18th National Hockey League season in Calgary. After a disappointing 1996–97 season, the Flames looked to newly hired coach Brian Sutter to return the Flames to the playoffs.

The off-season featured the trade of highly popular forward Gary Roberts shortly before the season began. Roberts missed the entire 1996–97 NHL season due to injury after playing only 35 games in 1995–96. Feeling that playing in the Eastern Conference with its lower travel would help aid him in his comeback, the Flames agreed to trade Roberts. He was dealt, along with starting goaltender Trevor Kidd to the Carolina Hurricanes for Andrew Cassels and Jean-Sebastien Giguere.

The season would serve as a bitter disappointment for the Flames from start to end, as the Flames would struggle to score goals all season long, ultimately finishing with the worst record in Calgary history at 26–41–15, while 67 points was the lowest in franchise history since the expansion Atlanta Flames managed just 65 in 1972–73. The Flames finished eleven points behind the 8th place San Jose Sharks, missing the playoffs for the second straight season.

Theoren Fleury was named to the North American team at the 1998 NHL All Star Game, where he recorded two assists playing on a line with Wayne Gretzky and Mark Recchi. Defenceman Derek Morris was named a Rookie All Star.

Fleury also represented Canada at the 1998 Winter Olympics in Nagano, Japan.

Prior to the start of the season, the Flames purchased the Western Hockey League's Calgary Hitmen for approximately $1.5 million. The struggling franchise was nearly destroyed by the fallout of the Graham James scandal.

== Regular season ==
On Friday, October 17, 1997, the Flames scored three short-handed goals in a 6-5 win over the Colorado Avalanche.

=== Season standings ===
Pacific Division
No.	CR		GP	W	L	T	GF	GA	Pts
1	2	**Colorado Avalanche**	82	39	26	17	231	205	95
2	5	**Los Angeles Kings**	82	38	33	11	227	225	87
3	7	**Edmonton Oilers**	82	35	37	10	215	224	80
4	8	**San Jose Sharks**	82	34	38	10	210	216	78
5	11	Calgary Flames	82	26	41	15	217	252	67
6	12	Mighty Ducks of Anaheim	82	26	43	13	205	261	65
7	13	Vancouver Canucks	82	25	43	14	224	273	64

Note: CR = Conference rank; GP = Games played; W = Wins; L = Losses; T = Ties; GF = Goals for; GA = Goals against; Pts = Points
Bolded teams qualified for the playoffs.

Western Conference
R		Div	GP	W	L	T	GF	GA	Pts
**1**	**p – Dallas Stars**	**CEN**	**82**	**49**	**22**	**11**	**242**	**167**	**109**
**2**	**x – Colorado Avalanche**	**PAC**	**82**	**39**	**26**	**17**	**231**	**205**	**95**
**3**	**Detroit Red Wings**	**CEN**	**82**	**44**	**23**	**15**	**250**	**196**	**103**
**4**	**St. Louis Blues**	**CEN**	**82**	**45**	**29**	**8**	**256**	**204**	**98**
**5**	**Los Angeles Kings**	**PAC**	**82**	**38**	**33**	**11**	**227**	**225**	**87**
**6**	**Phoenix Coyotes**	**CEN**	**82**	**35**	**35**	**12**	**224**	**227**	**82**
**7**	**Edmonton Oilers**	**PAC**	**82**	**35**	**37**	**10**	**215**	**224**	**80**
**8**	**San Jose Sharks**	**PAC**	**82**	**34**	**38**	**10**	**210**	**216**	**78**
9	Chicago Blackhawks	CEN	82	30	39	13	192	199	73
10	Toronto Maple Leafs	CEN	82	30	43	9	194	237	69
11	Calgary Flames	PAC	82	26	41	15	217	252	67
12	Mighty Ducks of Anaheim	PAC	82	26	43	13	205	261	65
13	Vancouver Canucks	PAC	82	25	43	14	224	273	64

Divisions: CEN – Central, PAC – Pacific

bold – Qualified for playoffs; x – Won Division; p – Won Presidents' Trophy

== Schedule and results ==
1997–98 regular season
October: 3–8–2 (home: 3–4–1; road: 0–4–1)

Game	Date	Visitor	Score	Home	OT	Decision	Attendance	Record	Pts	Recap
1	October 1	Detroit	3 – 1	Calgary		Tabaracci	17,893	0–1–0	0	L
2	October 3	Colorado	4 – 1	Calgary		Tabaracci	15,327	0–2–0	0	L
3	October 7	Toronto	2 – 1	Calgary		Tabaracci	16,831	0–3–0	0	L
4	October 9	NY Rangers	1 – 1	Calgary	OT	Roloson	16,756	0–3–1	1	T
5	October 12	Calgary	4 – 4	Detroit	OT	Tabaracci	19,983	0–3–2	2	T
6	October 14	Calgary	4 – 5	Dallas	OT	Roloson	14,892	0–4–2	2	L
7	October 17	Colorado	5 – 6	Calgary	OT	Tabaracci	16,432	1–4–2	4	W
8	October 18	Boston	3 – 0	Calgary		Tabaracci	16,673	1–5–2	4	L
9	October 22	Calgary	1 – 4	Buffalo		Tabaracci	11,222	1–6–2	4	L
10	October 23	Calgary	3 – 4	Philadelphia		Roloson	19,319	1–7–2	4	L
11	October 25	Calgary	3 – 4	Toronto		Tabaracci	15,726	1–8–2	4	L
12	October 28	Pittsburgh	3 – 6	Calgary		Moss	15,645	2–8–2	6	W
13	October 30	Phoenix	2 – 4	Calgary		Moss	15,761	3–8–2	8	W

November: 2–7–5 (home: 1–3–1; road: 1–4–4)

Game	Date	Visitor	Score	Home	OT	Decision	Attendance	Record	Pts	Recap
14	November 1	Calgary	2 – 2	Colorado	OT	Moss	16,061	3–8–3	9	T
15	November 2	Calgary	1 – 3	Phoenix		Tabaracci	14,928	3–9–3	9	L
16	November 5	Toronto	4 – 3	Calgary		Moss	16,322	3–10–3	9	L
17	November 7	Anaheim	4 – 3	Calgary	OT	Moss	16,487	3–11–3	9	L
18	November 9	Calgary	3 – 6	Detroit		Tabaracci	19,983	3–12–3	9	L
19	November 10	Calgary	1 – 1	Chicago	OT	Roloson	15,753	3–12–4	10	T
20	November 13	Carolina	4 – 2	Calgary		Roloson	15,113	3–13–4	10	L
21	November 15	Calgary	2 – 2	Edmonton	OT	Tabaracci	17,099	3–13–5	11	T
22	November 18	Calgary	1 – 2	New Jersey		Tabaracci	15,092	3–14–5	11	L
23	November 20	Calgary	2 – 1	Florida		Tabaracci	14,703	4–14–5	13	W
24	November 22	Calgary	3 – 4	Tampa Bay		Tabaracci	15,176	4–15–5	13	L
25	November 23	Calgary	3 – 3	Carolina	OT	Tabracci	5,516	4–15–6	14	T
26	November 27	Chicago	2 – 2	Calgary	OT	Tabaracci	16,641	4–15–7	15	T
27	November 29	Anaheim	3 – 4	Calgary	OT	Tabaracci	18,334	5–15–7	17	W

December: 6–8–1 (home: 4–5–0; road: 2–3–1)

Game	Date	Visitor	Score	Home	OT	Decision	Attendance	Record	Pts	Recap
28	December 1	San Jose	2 – 3	Calgary	OT	Tabaracci	15,268	6–15–7	19	W
29	December 3	Detroit	4 – 3	Calgary		Tabaracci	16,310	6–16–7	19	L
30	December 5	Calgary	1 – 4	Dallas		Roloson	16,688	6–17–7	19	L
31	December 6	Calgary	3 – 4	St. Louis	OT	Tabaracci	N/A	6–18–7	19	L
32	December 9	Calgary	3 – 1	NY Islanders		Tabaracci	9,251	7–18–7	21	W
33	December 10	Calgary	4 – 1	NY Rangers		Tabaracci	18,200	8–18–7	23	W
34	December 12	Colorado	1 – 3	Calgary		Tabaracci	17,450	9–18–7	25	W
35	December 16	Chicago	3 – 4	Calgary	OT	Tabaracci	15,462	10–18–7	27	W
36	December 18	Dallas	2 – 1	Calgary		Tabaracci	15,667	10–19–7	27	L
37	December 20	Los Angeles	4 – 1	Calgary		Tabaracci	15,873	10–20–7	27	L
38	December 22	Calgary	1 – 5	Anaheim		Tabaracci	16,975	10–21–7	27	L
39	December 23	Calgary	2 – 2	Phoenix	OT	Roloson	15,424	10–21–8	28	T
40	December 27	Philadelphia	2 – 5	Calgary		Roloson	18,742	11–21–8	30	W
41	December 29	Phoenix	5 – 3	Calgary		Roloson	18,742	11–22–8	30	L
42	December 31	Montreal	3 – 2	Calgary		Tabaracci	18,742	11–23–8	30	L

January: 3–6–3 (home: 1–1–2; road: 2–5–1)

Game	Date	Visitor	Score	Home	OT	Decision	Attendance	Record	Pts	Recap
43	January 3	Calgary	3 – 4	St. Louis		Tabaracci	N/A	11–24–8	30	L
44	January 5	Calgary	1 – 1	Chicago	OT	Tabaracci	15,941	11–24–9	31	T
45	January 6	Calgary	3 – 1	Colorado		Roloson	16,061	12–24–9	33	W
46	January 9	Florida	3 – 3	Calgary	OT	Tabaracci	17,010	12–24–10	34	T
47	January 10	St. Louis	5 – 1	Calgary		Roloson	18,562	12–25–10	34	L
48	January 14	Calgary	2 – 5	Edmonton		Roloson	17,099	12–26–10	34	L
49	January 20	Calgary	3 – 4	Los Angeles		Moss	10,367	12–27–10	34	L
50	January 21	Calgary	1 – 7	San Jose		Roloson	16,553	12–28–10	34	L
51	January 24	Vancouver	2 – 5	Calgary		Roloson	18,627	13–28–10	36	W
52	January 28	Calgary	5 – 2	Anaheim		Tabaracci	16,758	14–28–10	38	W
53	January 29	Calgary	3 – 5	Los Angeles		Tabaracci	9,586	14–29–10	38	L
54	January 31	New Jersey	2 – 2	Calgary		Roloson	18,719	14–29–11	39	T

February: 2–1–1 (home: 2–1–1; road: 0–0–0)

Game	Date	Visitor	Score	Home	OT	Decision	Attendance	Record	Pts	Recap
55	February 3	Los Angeles	6 – 3	Calgary		Roloson	15,815	14–30–11	39	L
56	February 5	San Jose	2 – 4	Calgary		Roloson	15,391	15–30–11	41	W
57	February 7	Edmonton	2 – 4	Calgary		Roloson	18,719	16–30–11	43	W
58	February 27	Vancouver	4 – 4	Calgary	OT	Roloson	15,586	16–30–12	44	T

March: 8–6–1 (home: 6–1–0; road: 2–5–1)

Game	Date	Visitor	Score	Home	OT	Decision	Attendance	Record	Pts	Recap
59	March 1	Ottawa	1 – 2	Calgary		Roloson	17,463	17–30–12	46	W
60	March 3	Tampa Bay	1 – 2	Calgary		Roloson	15,831	18–30–12	48	W
61	March 5	Calgary	6 – 2	Vancouver		Roloson	15,613	19–30–12	50	W
62	March 7	Calgary	1 – 2	Ottawa		Roloson	18,036	19–31–12	50	L
63	March 9	Calgary	2 – 5	Washington		Tabaracci	12,011	19–32–12	50	L
64	March 11	Calgary	1 – 4	Pittsburgh		Roloson	14,655	19–33–12	50	L
65	March 12	Calgary	5 – 2	Boston		Roloson	14,677	20–33–12	52	W
66	March 14	Calgary	1 – 2	Toronto		Roloson	15,726	20–34–12	52	L
67	March 16	Calgary	3 – 3	Montreal	OT	Roloson	20,504	20–34–13	53	T
68	March 20	NY Islanders	1 – 4	Calgary		Tabaracci	18,189	21–34–13	55	W
69	March 22	St. Louis	3 – 5	Calgary		Tabaracci	16,675	22–34–13	57	W
70	March 24	Buffalo	2 – 0	Calgary		Tabaracci	16,296	22–35–13	57	L
71	March 26	Washington	2 – 3	Calgary		Tabaracci	15,782	23–35–13	59	W
72	March 28	Los Angeles	2 – 5	Calgary		Tabaracci	16,998	24–35–13	61	W
73	March 30	Calgary	1 – 3	Edmonton		Tabaracci	17,099	24–36–13	61	L

April: 2–5–2 (home: 1–2–1; road: 1–3–1)

Game	Date	Visitor	Score	Home	OT	Decision	Attendance	Record	Pts	Recap
74	April 1	Dallas	1 – 3	Calgary		Roloson	17,012	25–36–13	63	W
75	April 5	Calgary	3 – 3	Anaheim	OT	Roloson	17,174	25–36–14	64	T
76	April 7	Calgary	0 – 6	San Jose		Tabaracci	17,483	25–37–14	64	L
77	April 9	Vancouver	6 – 3	Calgary		Roloson	16,313	25–38–14	64	L
78	April 11	Edmonton	5 – 4	Calgary		Roloson	18,719	25–39–14	64	L
79	April 13	Calgary	2 – 4	Los Angeles		Roloson	12,049	25–40–14	64	L
80	April 15	San Jose	3 – 3	Calgary	OT	Roloson	16,567	25–40–15	65	T
81	April 17	Calgary	4 – 2	Vancouver		Roloson	16,602	26–40–15	67	W
82	April 18	Calgary	1 – 4	San Jose		Roloson	17,483	26–41–15	67	L

Legend: W Win (2 points) L Loss (0 points) T Tie (1 point)

== Player statistics ==
=== Scoring ===
- Position abbreviations: C = Centre; D = Defence; G = Goaltender; LW = Left wing; RW = Right wing
- † = Joined team via a transaction (e.g., trade, waivers, signing) during the season. Stats reflect time with the Flames only.
- ‡ = Left team via a transaction (e.g., trade, waivers, release) during the season. Stats reflect time with the Flames only.

No.	Player	Pos	Regular season					
No.	Player	Pos	GP	G	A	Pts	+/-	PIM
14	Theoren Fleury	RW	82	27	51	78	0	197
16	Cory Stillman	LW	72	27	22	49	−9	40
18	Marty McInnis	LW	75	19	25	44	1	34
21	Andrew Cassels	C	81	17	27	44	−7	32
13	German Titov	C	68	18	22	40	−1	38
92	Michael Nylander	C	65	13	23	36	10	35
12	Jarome Iginla	RW	70	13	19	32	−10	29
53	Derek Morris	D	82	9	20	29	1	88
32	Cale Hulse	D	79	5	22	27	1	169
5	Tommy Albelin	D	69	2	17	19	9	32
3	James Patrick	D	60	6	11	17	−2	26
17	Hnat Domenichelli	LW	31	9	7	16	4	6
34	Jim Dowd	C	48	6	8	14	10	12
44	Jonas Hoglund‡	LW	50	6	8	14	−9	16
15	Sandy McCarthy‡	RW	52	8	5	13	−18	170
6	Joel Bouchard	D	44	5	7	12	0	57
2	Jamie Allison	D	43	3	8	11	3	104
8	Valeri Bure†	RW	16	5	4	9	0	2
42	Ed Ward	LW	64	4	5	9	−1	122
33	Zarley Zalapski‡	D	35	2	7	9	−12	41
7	Chris Dingman	LW	70	3	3	6	−11	149
27	Todd Simpson	D	53	1	5	6	−10	109
24	Jason Wiemer†	LW	12	4	1	5	−1	28
23	Aaron Gavey	C	26	2	3	5	−5	24
30	Dwayne Roloson	G	39	0	4	4		10
29	Erik Andersson	C	12	2	1	3	−4	8
19	Chris O'Sullivan	D	12	0	2	2	4	10
11	Eric Landry	C	12	1	0	1	−2	4
4	Kevin Dahl	D	19	0	1	1	−3	6
20	Todd Hlushko	LW	13	0	1	1	0	27
26	Ladislav Kohn	RW	4	0	1	1	2	0
31	Rick Tabaracci	G	42	0	1	1		14
57	Steve Begin	C	5	0	0	0	0	23
43	Travis Brigley	LW	5	0	0	0	0	23
39	Eric Charron	D	2	0	0	0	0	4
24	Denis Gauthier	D	10	0	0	0	−5	16
1	Tyler Moss	G	6	0	0	0		0
28	Marty Murray	C	2	0	0	0	1	2
8	Mike Peluso‡	LW	23	0	0	0	−6	113
55	Rocky Thompson	D	12	0	0	0	0	61
58	Sergei Varlamov	LW	1	0	0	0	0	0

=== Goaltending ===
No.	Player	Regular season									
No.	Player	GP	W	L	T	SA	GA	GAA	SV%	SO	TOI
31	Rick Tabaracci	42	13	22	6	1087	116	2.88	.893	0	2419
30	Dwayne Roloson	39	11	16	8	997	110	2.99	.890	0	2205
1	Tyler Moss	6	2	3	1	186	20	3.27	.892	0	367

== Awards and records ==
=== Awards ===
Type	Award/honour	Recipient	Ref
League (annual)	NHL All-Rookie Team	Derek Morris (Defence)	
League (in-season)	NHL All-Star Game selection	Theoren Fleury	
Team	Molson Cup	Theoren Fleury	
Team	Ralph T. Scurfield Humanitarian Award	Ed Ward	

=== Milestones ===
Milestone	Player	Date	Ref
First game	Steve Begin	October 1, 1997	
First game	Chris Dingman	October 1, 1997	
First game	Derek Morris	October 1, 1997	
First game	Denis Gauthier	October 9, 1997	
First game	Erik Andersson	October 17, 1997	
First game	Tyler Moss	October 28, 1997	
First game	Eric Landry	November 15, 1997	
First game	Rocky Thompson	January 28, 1998	
First game	Travis Brigley	April 11, 1998	
First game	Sergei Varlamov	April 17, 1998	

== Transactions ==
The Flames were involved in the following transactions during the 1997–98 season.

=== Trades ===
June 21, 1997	To Calgary Flames Rick Tabaracci	To Tampa Bay Lightning 4th round pick in 1998
August 25, 1997	To Calgary Flames Andrew Cassels; Jean-Sebastien Giguere	To Carolina Hurricanes Gary Roberts; Trevor Kidd
February 1, 1998	To Calgary Flames Valeri Bure; 4th round pick in 1998	To Montreal Canadiens Zarley Zalapski; Jonas Hoglund
March 24, 1998	To Calgary Flames Jason Wiemer	To Tampa Bay Lightning Sandy McCarthy; 3rd round pick in 1998; 5th round pick in 1998

=== Free agents ===
Player / Former team	Player / New team

== Draft picks ==
Calgary's picks at the 1997 NHL entry draft, held in Pittsburgh, Pennsylvania.

Rnd	Pick	Player	Nationality	Position	Team (league)	NHL statistics				
Rnd	Pick	Player	Nationality	Position	Team (league)	GP	G	A	Pts	PIM
1	6	Daniel Tkaczuk	Canada	C	Barrie Colts (OHL)	19	4	7	11	14
2	32	Evan Lindsay	Canada	G	Prince Albert Raiders (WHL)					
2	42	John Tripp	Canada	RW	Oshawa Generals (OHL)	43	2	7	9	35
2	51	Dmitri Kokorev	Russia	D	Moscow Dynamo (RSL)					
3	60	Derek Schultz	Canada	C	Spokane Chiefs (WHL)					
3	70	Erik Andersson	Sweden	LW	University of Denver (NCAA)	12	2	1	3	8
4	92	Chris St. Croix	United States	D	Kamloops Blazers (WHL)					
4	100	Ryan Ready	Canada	LW	Belleville Bulls (OHL)	7	0	1	1	0
5	113	Martin Moise	Canada	RW	Beauport Harfangs (QMJHL)					
6	140	Ilya Demidov	Russia	D	Oshawa Generals (OHL)					
7	167	Jeremy Rondeau	Canada	LW	Swift Current Broncos (WHL)					
9	223	Dustin Paul	Canada	RW	Moose Jaw Warriors (WHL)					

== Farm teams ==
=== Saint John Flames ===
The Baby Flames finished the 1997–98 American Hockey League season with a franchise record 43 wins, as their 43–24–13 record led the Flames to the Atlantic Division title, the first division championship in team history. The Flames marched to the Calder Cup finals, defeating the St. John's Maple Leafs 3–1, the Portland Pirates 4–2, and Hartford Wolf Pack 4–1. The Flames fell to the Philadelphia Phantoms 4–2 in the finals, however. Hnat Domenichelli led the Flames with 33 goals, while Ladislav Kohn led the team with 56 points. Tyler Moss played the majority of the games in goal, leading the team with 19 wins in 39 games, while his 2.49 GAA was just behind the 2.46 posted by Jean-Sebastien Giguere in 31 games.

== See also ==
- 1997–98 NHL season
