= 1997–98 St. Louis Blues season =

National Hockey League team season

1997–98 St. Louis Blues
- Division: 3rd Central
- Conference: 4th Western
- 1997–98 record: 45–29–8
- Home record: 26–10–5
- Road record: 19–19–3
- Goals for: 256
- Goals against: 204

Team information
- General manager: Larry Pleau
- Coach: Joel Quenneville
- Captain: Chris Pronger
- Arena: Kiel Center
- Average attendance: 18,414
- Minor league affiliates: Worcester IceCats; Peoria Rivermen; Baton Rouge Kingfish

Team leaders
- Goals: Geoff Courtnall (31)
- Assists: Pierre Turgeon (46)
- Points: Brett Hull (72)
- Penalty minutes: Kelly Chase (231)
- Plus/minus: Chris Pronger (+47)
- Wins: Grant Fuhr (29)
- Goals against average: Jamie McLennan (2.17)

The highlight of the 1997–98 St. Louis Blues season would mark an end of an era as former captain Brett Hull was not re-signed following the season.

== Off-season ==
In his first full season as head coach, Joel Quenneville decided to employ a defensive formula. The move worked wonders as even Brett Hull bought into the new system as the Blues finished in third place with a solid 45–29–8 record. In the first round of the playoffs, the Blues would sweep the Los Angeles Kings in four games. In the second round, the Blues were eliminated by the Detroit Red Wings in six games. The season would mark an end of an era, as Brett Hull was not signed to a new contract after the season, joining the Dallas Stars as a free agent during the summer.

Defenseman Chris Pronger was named team captain, a role that had been vacant during the previous season.

== Regular season ==
The Blues were one of only two teams out the NHL's 26 to score at least 3 goals per game (The Detroit Red Wings were the other team). The Blues' 256 goals for led all teams.

=== Final standings ===
Central Division
No.	CR		GP	W	L	T	GF	GA	Pts
1	1	**Dallas Stars**	82	49	22	11	242	167	109
2	3	**Detroit Red Wings**	82	44	23	15	250	196	103
3	4	**St. Louis Blues**	82	45	29	8	256	204	98
4	6	**Phoenix Coyotes**	82	35	35	12	224	227	82
5	9	Chicago Blackhawks	82	30	39	13	192	199	73
6	10	Toronto Maple Leafs	82	30	43	9	194	237	69

Western Conference
R		Div	GP	W	L	T	GF	GA	Pts
**1**	**p – Dallas Stars**	**CEN**	**82**	**49**	**22**	**11**	**242**	**167**	**109**
**2**	**x – Colorado Avalanche**	**PAC**	**82**	**39**	**26**	**17**	**231**	**205**	**95**
**3**	**Detroit Red Wings**	**CEN**	**82**	**44**	**23**	**15**	**250**	**196**	**103**
**4**	**St. Louis Blues**	**CEN**	**82**	**45**	**29**	**8**	**256**	**204**	**98**
**5**	**Los Angeles Kings**	**PAC**	**82**	**38**	**33**	**11**	**227**	**225**	**87**
**6**	**Phoenix Coyotes**	**CEN**	**82**	**35**	**35**	**12**	**224**	**227**	**82**
**7**	**Edmonton Oilers**	**PAC**	**82**	**35**	**37**	**10**	**215**	**224**	**80**
**8**	**San Jose Sharks**	**PAC**	**82**	**34**	**38**	**10**	**210**	**216**	**78**
9	Chicago Blackhawks	CEN	82	30	39	13	192	199	73
10	Toronto Maple Leafs	CEN	82	30	43	9	194	237	69
11	Calgary Flames	PAC	82	26	41	15	217	252	67
12	Mighty Ducks of Anaheim	PAC	82	26	43	13	205	261	65
13	Vancouver Canucks	PAC	82	25	43	14	224	273	64

Divisions: CEN – Central, PAC – Pacific

bold – Qualified for playoffs; x – Won Division; p – Won Presidents' Trophy

== Schedule and results ==
=== Regular season ===
1997–98 regular season
October: 10–2–2 (home: 7–1–1; road: 3–1–1)

Game	Date	Score	Opponent	Record	Recap
1	October 1, 1997	1–3	Buffalo Sabres (1997–98)	0–1–0	L
2	October 3, 1997	7–2	Phoenix Coyotes (1997–98)	1–1–0	W
3	October 4, 1997	2–1	@ Dallas Stars (1997–98)	2–1–0	W
4	October 9, 1997	3–2 OT	Los Angeles Kings (1997–98)	3–1–0	W
5	October 11, 1997	5–3	Florida Panthers (1997–98)	4–1–0	W
6	October 13, 1997	3–1	Carolina Hurricanes (1997–98)	5–1–0	W
7	October 17, 1997	2–0	@ Chicago Blackhawks (1997–98)	6–1–0	W
8	October 18, 1997	5–3	New York Rangers (1997–98)	7–1–0	W
9	October 20, 1997	3–3 OT	@ Detroit Red Wings (1997–98)	7–1–1	T
10	October 22, 1997	3–4	@ Carolina Hurricanes (1997–98)	7–2–1	L
11	October 23, 1997	4–1	Vancouver Canucks (1997–98)	8–2–1	W
12	October 25, 1997	5–2	Washington Capitals (1997–98)	9–2–1	W
13	October 29, 1997	3–2	@ Philadelphia Flyers (1997–98)	10–2–1	W
14	October 30, 1997	2–2 OT	Colorado Avalanche (1997–98)	10–2–2	T

November: 5–7–1 (home: 3–3–1; road: 2–4–0)

Game	Date	Score	Opponent	Record	Recap
15	November 1, 1997	2–0	San Jose Sharks (1997–98)	11–2–2	W
16	November 3, 1997	1–5	Philadelphia Flyers (1997–98)	11–3–2	L
17	November 6, 1997	1–2	@ Chicago Blackhawks (1997–98)	11–4–2	L
18	November 8, 1997	1–4	@ Colorado Avalanche (1997–98)	11–5–2	L
19	November 10, 1997	7–1	@ Dallas Stars (1997–98)	12–5–2	W
20	November 13, 1997	4–2	Boston Bruins (1997–98)	13–5–2	W
21	November 15, 1997	5–2	Detroit Red Wings (1997–98)	14–5–2	W
22	November 17, 1997	3–2	@ Toronto Maple Leafs (1997–98)	15–5–2	W
23	November 20, 1997	0–3	Edmonton Oilers (1997–98)	15–6–2	L
24	November 22, 1997	0–2	Mighty Ducks of Anaheim (1997–98)	15–7–2	L
25	November 25, 1997	2–3	@ Phoenix Coyotes (1997–98)	15–8–2	L
26	November 27, 1997	2–2 OT	Los Angeles Kings (1997–98)	15–8–3	T
27	November 29, 1997	2–4	@ New York Islanders (1997–98)	15–9–3	L

December: 7–6–3 (home: 4–3–2; road: 3–3–1)

Game	Date	Score	Opponent	Record	Recap
28	December 2, 1997	3–1	@ New Jersey Devils (1997–98)	16–9–3	W
29	December 4, 1997	4–3	Toronto Maple Leafs (1997–98)	17–9–3	W
30	December 6, 1997	4–3 OT	Calgary Flames (1997–98)	18–9–3	W
31	December 8, 1997	5–1	Vancouver Canucks (1997–98)	19–9–3	W
32	December 10, 1997	3–4 OT	@ Montreal Canadiens (1997–98)	19–10–3	L
33	December 11, 1997	2–1	@ Ottawa Senators (1997–98)	20–10–3	W
34	December 13, 1997	1–4	Edmonton Oilers (1997–98)	20–11–3	L
35	December 15, 1997	1–3	Ottawa Senators (1997–98)	20–12–3	L
36	December 18, 1997	4–4 OT	New Jersey Devils (1997–98)	20–12–4	T
37	December 20, 1997	4–1	Pittsburgh Penguins (1997–98)	21–12–4	W
38	December 22, 1997	2–2 OT	@ Tampa Bay Lightning (1997–98)	21–12–5	T
39	December 23, 1997	3–2	@ Florida Panthers (1997–98)	22–12–5	W
40	December 26, 1997	1–4	Chicago Blackhawks (1997–98)	22–13–5	L
41	December 27, 1997	5–5 OT	Mighty Ducks of Anaheim (1997–98)	22–13–6	T
42	December 29, 1997	2–4	@ Washington Capitals (1997–98)	22–14–6	L
43	December 31, 1997	2–5	@ Detroit Red Wings (1997–98)	22–15–6	L

January: 6–5–2 (home: 3–1–1; road: 3–4–1)

Game	Date	Score	Opponent	Record	Recap
44	January 3, 1998	4–3	Calgary Flames (1997–98)	23–15–6	W
45	January 6, 1998	5–1	@ San Jose Sharks (1997–98)	24–15–6	W
46	January 7, 1998	3–2	@ Vancouver Canucks (1997–98)	25–15–6	W
47	January 10, 1998	5–1	@ Calgary Flames (1997–98)	26–15–6	W
48	January 12, 1998	1–2	@ Edmonton Oilers (1997–98)	26–16–6	L
49	January 14, 1998	1–2 OT	Dallas Stars (1997–98)	26–17–6	L
50	January 20, 1998	1–3	@ New York Rangers (1997–98)	26–18–6	L
51	January 22, 1998	3–3 OT	New York Islanders (1997–98)	26–18–7	T
52	January 24, 1998	4–5	@ Chicago Blackhawks (1997–98)	26–19–7	L
53	January 26, 1998	2–4	@ Pittsburgh Penguins (1997–98)	26–20–7	L
54	January 27, 1998	3–3 OT	@ Buffalo Sabres (1997–98)	26–20–8	T
55	January 29, 1998	2–0	Toronto Maple Leafs (1997–98)	27–20–8	W
56	January 31, 1998	6–3	Dallas Stars (1997–98)	28–20–8	W

February: 3–2–0 (home: 1–0–0; road: 2–2–0)

Game	Date	Score	Opponent	Record	Recap
57	February 4, 1998	2–3	@ Toronto Maple Leafs (1997–98)	28–21–8	L
58	February 5, 1998	3–1	@ Boston Bruins (1997–98)	29–21–8	W
59	February 7, 1998	4–1	Detroit Red Wings (1997–98)	30–21–8	W
60	February 26, 1998	1–3	@ San Jose Sharks (1997–98)	30–22–8	L
61	February 28, 1998	5–2	@ Los Angeles Kings (1997–98)	31–22–8	W

March: 8–4–0 (home: 6–1–0; road: 2–3–0)

Game	Date	Score	Opponent	Record	Recap
62	March 1, 1998	6–2	@ Mighty Ducks of Anaheim (1997–98)	32–22–8	W
63	March 3, 1998	5–3	Chicago Blackhawks (1997–98)	33–22–8	W
64	March 5, 1998	4–0	Montreal Canadiens (1997–98)	34–22–8	W
65	March 7, 1998	2–1	Dallas Stars (1997–98)	35–22–8	W
66	March 9, 1998	4–0	@ Vancouver Canucks (1997–98)	36–22–8	W
67	March 11, 1998	2–3	@ Colorado Avalanche (1997–98)	36–23–8	L
68	March 14, 1998	0–2	Phoenix Coyotes (1997–98)	36–24–8	L
69	March 21, 1998	0–2	@ Edmonton Oilers (1997–98)	36–25–8	L
70	March 22, 1998	3–5	@ Calgary Flames (1997–98)	36–26–8	L
71	March 26, 1998	3–2	Tampa Bay Lightning (1997–98)	37–26–8	W
72	March 28, 1998	3–2	Detroit Red Wings (1997–98)	38–26–8	W
73	March 30, 1998	6–2	San Jose Sharks (1997–98)	39–26–8	W

April: 6–3–0 (home: 2–1–0; road: 4–2–0)

Game	Date	Score	Opponent	Record	Recap
74	April 1, 1998	6–4	@ Toronto Maple Leafs (1997–98)	40–26–8	W
75	April 4, 1998	4–1	Colorado Avalanche (1997–98)	41–26–8	W
76	April 7, 1998	3–5	@ Detroit Red Wings (1997–98)	41–27–8	L
77	April 9, 1998	3–2	Chicago Blackhawks (1997–98)	42–27–8	W
78	April 11, 1998	3–4	Phoenix Coyotes (1997–98)	42–28–8	L
79	April 12, 1998	3–4	@ Dallas Stars (1997–98)	42–29–8	L
80	April 16, 1998	7–3	@ Los Angeles Kings (1997–98)	43–29–8	W
81	April 18, 1998	5–4	@ Phoenix Coyotes (1997–98)	44–29–8	W
82	April 19, 1998	5–3	@ Mighty Ducks of Anaheim (1997–98)	45–29–8	W

Legend: W Win (2 points) L Loss (0 points) T Tie (1 point)

=== Playoffs ===
1998 Stanley Cup playoffs
Western Conference Quarterfinals vs. (5) Los Angeles Kings: Blues win 4–0

Game	Date	Score	Opponent	Series	Recap
1	April 23, 1998	8–3	Los Angeles Kings	Blues lead 1–0	W
2	April 25, 1998	2–1	Los Angeles Kings	Blues lead 2–0	W
3	April 27, 1998	4–3	@ Los Angeles Kings	Blues lead 3–0	W
4	April 29, 1998	2–1	@ Los Angeles Kings	Blues win 4–0	W

Western Conference Semifinals vs. (3) Detroit Red Wings: Red Wings win 4–2

Game	Date	Score	Opponent	Series	Recap
1	May 8, 1998	4–2	@ Detroit Red Wings	Blues lead 1–0	W
2	May 10, 1998	1–6	@ Detroit Red Wings	Series tied 1–1	L
3	May 12, 1998	2–3 2OT	Detroit Red Wings	Red Wings lead 2–1	L
4	May 14, 1998	2–5	Detroit Red Wings	Red Wings lead 3–1	L
5	May 17, 1998	3–1	@ Detroit Red Wings	Red Wings lead 3–2	W
6	May 19, 1998	1–6	Detroit Red Wings	Red Wings win 4–2	L

Legend: W Win L Loss

== Player statistics ==
=== Scoring ===
- Position abbreviations: C = Center; D = Defense; G = Goaltender; LW = Left wing; RW = Right wing
- † = Joined team via a transaction (e.g., trade, waivers, signing) during the season. Stats reflect time with the Blues only.
- ‡ = Left team via a transaction (e.g., trade, waivers, release) during the season. Stats reflect time with the Blues only.

No.	Player	Pos	Regular season						Playoffs					
No.	Player	Pos	GP	G	A	Pts	+/-	PIM	GP	G	A	Pts	+/-	PIM
16	Brett Hull	RW	66	27	45	72	−1	26	10	3	3	6	−3	2
77	Pierre Turgeon	C	60	22	46	68	13	24	10	4	4	8	−5	2
14	Geoff Courtnall	LW	79	31	31	62	12	94	10	2	8	10	−2	18
28	Steve Duchesne	D	80	14	42	56	9	32	10	0	4	4	−8	6
38	Pavol Demitra	LW	61	22	30	52	11	22	10	3	3	6	−3	2
2	Al MacInnis	D	71	19	30	49	6	80	8	2	6	8	1	12
22	Craig Conroy	C	81	14	29	43	20	46	10	1	2	3	−1	8
10	Jim Campbell	RW	76	22	19	41	0	55	10	7	3	10	−1	12
44	Chris Pronger	D	81	9	27	36	47	180	10	1	9	10	−2	26
33	Scott Pellerin	LW	80	8	21	29	14	62	10	0	2	2	1	10
23	Blair Atcheynum	RW	61	11	15	26	5	10	10	0	0	0	−2	2
27	Terry Yake	C	65	10	15	25	1	38	10	2	1	3	−3	6
9	Darren Turcotte	C	62	12	6	18	6	26	10	0	0	0	−4	2
25	Pascal Rheaume	C	48	6	9	15	4	35	10	1	3	4	0	8
17	Joe Murphy‡	RW	27	4	9	13	8	22	—	—	—	—	—	—
37	Harry York‡	C	58	4	6	10	0	31	—	—	—	—	—	—
4	Marc Bergevin	D	81	3	7	10	−2	90	10	0	1	1	−1	8
19	Chris McAlpine	D	54	3	7	10	14	36	10	0	0	0	−1	16
5	Todd Gill†	D	11	5	4	9	2	10	10	2	2	4	−3	10
34	Michel Picard†	LW	16	1	8	9	3	29	—	—	—	—	—	—
20	Rudy Poeschek	RW/D	50	1	7	8	−5	64	2	0	0	0	−2	6
39	Kelly Chase	RW	67	4	3	7	10	231	7	0	0	0	−2	23
6	Jamie Rivers	D	59	2	4	6	5	36	—	—	—	—	—	—
18	Tony Twist	LW	60	1	1	2	−4	105	—	—	—	—	—	—
31	Grant Fuhr	G	58	0	2	2		6	10	0	1	1		2
12	Chris Kenady	RW	5	0	2	2	1	0	—	—	—	—	—	—
32	Mike Eastwood†	C	10	1	0	1	0	6	3	1	0	1	−1	0
43	Libor Zabransky	D	6	0	1	1	−3	6	—	—	—	—	—	—
29	Jamie McLennan	G	30	0	0	0		4	1	0	0	0		0
30	Rich Parent	G	1	0	0	0		0	—	—	—	—	—	—
7	Ricard Persson	D	1	0	0	0	0	0	—	—	—	—	—	—

=== Goaltending ===
No.	Player	Regular season										Playoffs								
No.	Player	GP	W	L	T	SA	GA	GAA	SV%	SO	TOI	GP	W	L	SA	GA	GAA	SV%	SO	TOI
31	Grant Fuhr	58	29	21	6	1354	138	2.53	.898	3	3274	10	6	4	297	28	2.73	.906	0	616
29	Jamie McLennan	30	16	8	2	618	60	2.17	.903	2	1658	1	0	0	4	1	4.25	.750	0	14
30	Rich Parent	1	0	0	0	1	0	0.00	1.000	0	12	—	—	—	—	—	—	—	—	—

== Awards and records ==
=== Awards ===
Type	Award/honor	Recipient	Ref
League (annual)	Bill Masterton Memorial Trophy	Jamie McLennan	
League (annual)	King Clancy Memorial Trophy	Kelly Chase	
League (annual)	NHL Second All-Star Team	Chris Pronger (Defense)	
League (annual)	NHL Plus-Minus Award	Chris Pronger	
League (in-season)	NHL All-Star Game selection	Al MacInnis (Note: Commissioner’s selection.)	

=== Milestones ===
Milestone	Player	Date	Ref
1,000th game played	Al MacInnis	October 23, 1997	
1,000th game played	Geoff Courtnall	March 3, 1998	
First game	Rich Parent	November 8, 1997	
First game	Chris Kenady	December 8, 1997	
1,000th point	Al MacInnis	April 7, 1998	

== Draft picks ==
St. Louis's draft picks at the 1997 NHL entry draft held at the Civic Arena in Pittsburgh, Pennsylvania.

Round	#	Player	Nationality	College/Junior/Club team (League)
2	40	Tyler Rennette	Canada	North Bay Centennials (OHL)
4	86	Didier Tremblay	Canada	Halifax Mooseheads (QMJHL)
4	98	Jan Horacek	Czech Republic	Slavia Prague (Czech Republic)
4	106	Jame Pollock	Canada	Seattle Thunderbirds (WHL)
6	149	Nicholas Bilotto	Canada	Beauport Harfangs (QMJHL)
7	177	Ladislav Nagy	Slovakia	HC Košice (Slovakia)
8	206	Bob Haglund	United States	Des Moines Buccaneers (USHL)
9	232	Dmitri Plekhanov	Russia	Neftekhimik Nizhnekamsk (Russia)
9	244	Marek Ivan	Czech Republic	Lethbridge Hurricanes (WHL)

== See also ==
- 1997–98 NHL season
