= 1997–98 Tampa Bay Lightning season =

National Hockey League team season

1997–98 Tampa Bay Lightning
- Division: 7th Atlantic
- Conference: 13th Eastern
- 1997–98 record: 17–55–10
- Home record: 11–23–7
- Road record: 6–32–3
- Goals for: 151
- Goals against: 269

Team information
- General manager: Phil Esposito
- Coach: Terry Crisp (Oct.); Rick Paterson (Oct.–Nov.); Jacques Demers (Nov.–Apr.)
- Captain: Paul Ysebaert (Oct.); Vacant (Oct.–Nov.); Mikael Renberg (Nov.–Apr.)
- Alternate captains: Jamie Huscroft (Oct.–Mar.); Rob Zamuner
- Arena: Ice Palace
- Average attendance: 13,866
- Minor league affiliates: Adirondack Red Wings; Chesapeake Icebreakers

Team leaders
- Goals: Mikael Renberg (16); Alexander Selivanov (16)
- Assists: Paul Ysebaert (27)
- Points: Paul Ysebaert (40)
- Penalty minutes: Louie DeBrusk (166)
- Plus/minus: Jody Hull (+2)
- Wins: Mark Fitzpatrick (7)
- Goals against average: Daren Puppa (2.72)

The 1997–98 Tampa Bay Lightning season was the Lightning's sixth season of operation. The Lightning missed the playoffs for the second consecutive year for the first time since the 1993–94 season and the 1994–95 season.

== Regular season ==
On October 26, head coach Terry Crisp was fired after a 2–7–2 start and Paul Ysebaert’s tenure as team captain ended. Assistant coach Rick Paterson served as interim head coach until Jacques Demers was hired as the team’s new head coach on November 12. Demers named Mikael Renberg the team’s new captain on November 19.

The Lightning struggled offensively during the regular season, being shut out a league-high 11 times (tied with the Chicago Blackhawks and the Mighty Ducks of Anaheim) and finishing 26th in goals scored (151), power-play goals scored (33) and power-play percentage (9.35%). The 9.35% power play was the lowest in NHL history in one season by any team until the 2020-21 Anaheim Ducks surpassed it with an 8.94% power play efficiency; the Lightning’s percentage remains the lowest in a full, non-shortened NHL season.

=== Final standings ===
Atlantic Division
No.	CR		GP	W	L	T	GF	GA	Pts
1	1	**New Jersey Devils**	82	48	23	11	225	166	107
2	3	**Philadelphia Flyers**	82	42	29	11	242	193	95
3	4	**Washington Capitals**	82	40	30	12	219	202	92
4	10	New York Islanders	82	30	41	11	212	225	71
5	11	New York Rangers	82	25	39	18	197	231	68
6	12	Florida Panthers	82	24	43	15	203	256	63
7	13	Tampa Bay Lightning	82	17	55	10	151	269	44

Eastern Conference
R		Div	GP	W	L	T	GF	GA	Pts
**1**	**New Jersey Devils**	**ATL**	**82**	**48**	**23**	**11**	**225**	**166**	**107**
**2**	**Pittsburgh Penguins**	**NE**	**82**	**40**	**24**	**18**	**228**	**188**	**98**
**3**	**Philadelphia Flyers**	**ATL**	**82**	**42**	**29**	**11**	**242**	**193**	**95**
**4**	**Washington Capitals**	**ATL**	**82**	**40**	**30**	**12**	**219**	**202**	**92**
**5**	**Boston Bruins**	**NE**	**82**	**39**	**30**	**13**	**221**	**194**	**91**
**6**	**Buffalo Sabres**	**NE**	**82**	**36**	**29**	**17**	**211**	**187**	**89**
**7**	**Montreal Canadiens**	**NE**	**82**	**37**	**32**	**13**	**235**	**208**	**87**
**8**	**Ottawa Senators**	**NE**	**82**	**34**	**33**	**15**	**193**	**200**	**83**
9	Carolina Hurricanes	NE	82	33	41	8	200	219	74
10	New York Islanders	ATL	82	30	41	11	212	225	71
11	New York Rangers	ATL	82	25	39	18	197	231	68
12	Florida Panthers	ATL	82	24	43	15	203	256	63
13	Tampa Bay Lightning	ATL	82	17	55	10	151	269	44

Divisions: ATL – Atlantic, NE – Northeast

bold – Qualified for playoffs

== Schedule and results ==
1997–98 regular season
October: 2–9–2 (home: 1–4–1; road: 1–5–1)

Game	Date	Score	Opponent	Record	Recap
1	October 1, 1997	4–2	Carolina Hurricanes (1997–98)	1–0–0	W
2	October 3, 1997	3–4	New Jersey Devils (1997–98)	1–1–0	L
3	October 5, 1997	1–1 OT	Buffalo Sabres (1997–98)	1–1–1	T
4	October 9, 1997	4–1	@ Chicago Blackhawks (1997–98)	2–1–1	W
5	October 10, 1997	0–3	@ Detroit Red Wings (1997–98)	2–2–1	L
6	October 15, 1997	1–2	@ Florida Panthers (1997–98)	2–3–1	L
7	October 17, 1997	1–4	Pittsburgh Penguins (1997–98)	2–4–1	L
8	October 18, 1997	0–5	@ New Jersey Devils (1997–98)	2–5–1	L
9	October 21, 1997	1–7	@ Philadelphia Flyers (1997–98)	2–6–1	L
10	October 23, 1997	2–2 OT	@ Boston Bruins (1997–98)	2–6–2	T
11	October 24, 1997	3–4	@ New York Rangers (1997–98)	2–7–2	L
12	October 26, 1997	1–3	Los Angeles Kings (1997–98)	2–8–2	L
13	October 29, 1997	2–5	Ottawa Senators (1997–98)	2–9–2	L

November: 2–8–2 (home: 2–1–2; road: 0–7–0)

Game	Date	Score	Opponent	Record	Recap
14	November 5, 1997	2–5	@ Mighty Ducks of Anaheim (1997–98)	2–10–2	L
15	November 6, 1997	2–5	@ Los Angeles Kings (1997–98)	2–11–2	L
16	November 8, 1997	1–3	@ San Jose Sharks (1997–98)	2–12–2	L
17	November 11, 1997	2–5	@ Phoenix Coyotes (1997–98)	2–13–2	L
18	November 14, 1997	1–4	New York Islanders (1997–98)	2–14–2	L
19	November 16, 1997	2–3	@ Philadelphia Flyers (1997–98)	2–15–2	L
20	November 17, 1997	1–4	@ Montreal Canadiens (1997–98)	2–16–2	L
21	November 19, 1997	6–3	New York Rangers (1997–98)	3–16–2	W
22	November 22, 1997	4–3	Calgary Flames (1997–98)	4–16–2	W
23	November 26, 1997	3–3 OT	Colorado Avalanche (1997–98)	4–16–3	T
24	November 28, 1997	0–2	@ Carolina Hurricanes (1997–98)	4–17–3	L
25	November 29, 1997	3–3 OT	Philadelphia Flyers (1997–98)	4–17–4	T

December: 5–6–3 (home: 4–1–2; road: 1–5–1)

Game	Date	Score	Opponent	Record	Recap
26	December 3, 1997	2–1	Phoenix Coyotes (1997–98)	5–17–4	W
27	December 5, 1997	0–4	@ Buffalo Sabres (1997–98)	5–18–4	L
28	December 6, 1997	2–4	@ New Jersey Devils (1997–98)	5–19–4	L
29	December 10, 1997	0–3	@ Dallas Stars (1997–98)	5–20–4	L
30	December 13, 1997	3–1	@ Ottawa Senators (1997–98)	6–20–4	W
31	December 14, 1997	0–3	@ Philadelphia Flyers (1997–98)	6–21–4	L
32	December 16, 1997	1–1 OT	@ Pittsburgh Penguins (1997–98)	6–21–5	T
33	December 17, 1997	2–0	Boston Bruins (1997–98)	7–21–5	W
34	December 20, 1997	2–2 OT	New York Rangers (1997–98)	7–21–6	T
35	December 22, 1997	2–2 OT	St. Louis Blues (1997–98)	7–21–7	T
36	December 23, 1997	1–4	@ New York Rangers (1997–98)	7–22–7	L
37	December 27, 1997	1–3	Boston Bruins (1997–98)	7–23–7	L
38	December 29, 1997	2–1	San Jose Sharks (1997–98)	8–23–7	W
39	December 31, 1997	2–0	New York Rangers (1997–98)	9–23–7	W

January: 0–12–1 (home: 0–7–1; road: 0–5–0)

Game	Date	Score	Opponent	Record	Recap
40	January 2, 1998	2–2 OT	Florida Panthers (1997–98)	9–23–8	T
41	January 3, 1998	1–4	Mighty Ducks of Anaheim (1997–98)	9–24–8	L
42	January 7, 1998	2–5	Toronto Maple Leafs (1997–98)	9–25–8	L
43	January 9, 1998	1–4	@ New Jersey Devils (1997–98)	9–26–8	L
44	January 11, 1998	2–5	Philadelphia Flyers (1997–98)	9–27–8	L
45	January 12, 1998	3–6	Montreal Canadiens (1997–98)	9–28–8	L
46	January 14, 1998	1–7	New York Islanders (1997–98)	9–29–8	L
47	January 21, 1998	2–3 OT	Washington Capitals (1997–98)	9–30–8	L
48	January 23, 1998	1–4	@ Buffalo Sabres (1997–98)	9–31–8	L
49	January 24, 1998	2–5	@ Toronto Maple Leafs (1997–98)	9–32–8	L
50	January 26, 1998	1–2	@ Ottawa Senators (1997–98)	9–33–8	L
51	January 28, 1998	2–3	Carolina Hurricanes (1997–98)	9–34–8	L
52	January 31, 1998	0–2	@ Florida Panthers (1997–98)	9–35–8	L

February: 3–3–1 (home: 1–3–0; road: 2–0–1)

Game	Date	Score	Opponent	Record	Recap
53	February 2, 1998	3–7	Buffalo Sabres (1997–98)	9–36–8	L
54	February 4, 1998	3–3 OT	@ Carolina Hurricanes (1997–98)	9–36–9	T
55	February 5, 1998	4–5	Detroit Red Wings (1997–98)	9–37–9	L
56	February 7, 1998	4–3	@ Washington Capitals (1997–98)	10–37–9	W
57	February 25, 1998	4–3	@ Washington Capitals (1997–98)	11–37–9	W
58	February 26, 1998	1–4	New Jersey Devils (1997–98)	11–38–9	L
59	February 28, 1998	5–2	Washington Capitals (1997–98)	12–38–9	W

March: 5–8–0 (home: 3–2–0; road: 2–6–0)

Game	Date	Score	Opponent	Record	Recap
60	March 3, 1998	1–2	@ Calgary Flames (1997–98)	12–39–9	L
61	March 4, 1998	2–4	@ Edmonton Oilers (1997–98)	12–40–9	L
62	March 7, 1998	2–5	@ Vancouver Canucks (1997–98)	12–41–9	L
63	March 9, 1998	2–1	@ Colorado Avalanche (1997–98)	13–41–9	W
64	March 11, 1998	0–2	Edmonton Oilers (1997–98)	13–42–9	L
65	March 14, 1998	1–0	Chicago Blackhawks (1997–98)	14–42–9	W
66	March 16, 1998	3–4 OT	@ Boston Bruins (1997–98)	14–43–9	L
67	March 18, 1998	4–2	Vancouver Canucks (1997–98)	15–43–9	W
68	March 21, 1998	5–1	Florida Panthers (1997–98)	16–43–9	W
69	March 25, 1998	1–2 OT	Montreal Canadiens (1997–98)	16–44–9	L
70	March 26, 1998	2–3	@ St. Louis Blues (1997–98)	16–45–9	L
71	March 28, 1998	2–8	@ Montreal Canadiens (1997–98)	16–46–9	L
72	March 30, 1998	3–1	@ New York Rangers (1997–98)	17–46–9	W

April: 0–9–1 (home: 0–5–1; road: 0–4–0)

Game	Date	Score	Opponent	Record	Recap
73	April 1, 1998	0–4	@ New York Islanders (1997–98)	17–47–9	L
74	April 2, 1998	1–4	@ Washington Capitals (1997–98)	17–48–9	L
75	April 4, 1998	1–4	Pittsburgh Penguins (1997–98)	17–49–9	L
76	April 6, 1998	0–3	New York Islanders (1997–98)	17–50–9	L
77	April 8, 1998	1–6	Philadelphia Flyers (1997–98)	17–51–9	L
78	April 11, 1998	1–5	Dallas Stars (1997–98)	17–52–9	L
79	April 13, 1998	2–3	Ottawa Senators (1997–98)	17–53–9	L
80	April 15, 1998	1–5	@ Pittsburgh Penguins (1997–98)	17–54–9	L
81	April 16, 1998	0–4	@ New York Islanders (1997–98)	17–55–9	L
82	April 18, 1998	2–2 OT	Florida Panthers (1997–98)	17–55–10	T

Legend: W Win (2 points) L Loss (0 points) T Tie (1 point)

== Player statistics ==
=== Scoring ===
- Position abbreviations: C = Center; D = Defense; G = Goaltender; LW = Left wing; RW = Right wing
- † = Joined team via a transaction (e.g., trade, waivers, signing) during the season. Stats reflect time with the Lightning only.
- ‡ = Left team via a transaction (e.g., trade, waivers, release) during the season. Stats reflect time with the Lightning only.

No.	Player	Pos	Regular season					
No.	Player	Pos	GP	G	A	Pts	+/-	PIM
15	Paul Ysebaert	C	82	13	27	40	−43	32
20	Mikael Renberg	RW	68	16	22	38	−37	34
29	Alexander Selivanov	RW	70	16	19	35	−38	85
7	Rob Zamuner	LW	77	14	12	26	−31	41
18	Daymond Langkow	C	68	8	14	22	−9	62
44	Stephane Richer†	RW	26	9	11	20	−7	36
22	Dino Ciccarelli‡	RW	34	11	6	17	−14	42
24	Jason Wiemer‡	C	67	8	9	17	−9	132
34	Mikael Andersson	LW	72	6	11	17	−4	29
44	Roman Hamrlik‡	D	37	3	12	15	−18	22
16	Darcy Tucker†	RW	35	6	8	14	−8	89
14	Karl Dykhuis	D	78	5	9	14	−8	110
6	Jeff Norton‡	D	37	4	6	10	−25	26
64	Jason Bonsignore†	C	35	2	8	10	−11	22
4	Cory Cross	D	74	3	6	9	−24	77
28	Patrick Poulin‡	C	44	2	7	9	−3	19
5	Igor Ulanov‡	D	45	2	7	9	−5	85
33	Yves Racine	D	60	0	8	8	−23	41
19	Brian Bradley	C	14	2	5	7	−9	6
21	Jody Hull†	RW	28	2	4	6	2	4
23	Bryan Marchment†‡	D	22	2	4	6	−3	43
79	Vladimir Vujtek	LW	30	2	4	6	−2	16
6	David Wilkie†	D	29	1	5	6	−21	17
17	Brent Peterson	LW	19	5	0	5	−2	2
10	Sandy McCarthy†	RW	14	0	5	5	−1	71
11	Steve Kelly†	C	24	2	1	3	−9	15
5	Jassen Cullimore†	D	25	1	2	3	−4	22
36	Louie DeBrusk	LW	54	1	2	3	−2	166
3	Pavel Kubina	D	10	1	2	3	−1	22
9	Jeff Toms‡	C	13	1	2	3	−6	7
8	Jamie Huscroft‡	D	44	0	3	3	−4	122
62	Andrei Nazarov†	LW	14	1	1	2	−9	58
10	Paul Brousseau	RW	11	0	2	2	0	27
27	David Shaw‡	D	14	0	2	2	−2	12
28	Corey Spring	RW	8	1	0	1	−1	10
21	Mick Vukota‡	RW	42	1	0	1	0	116
30	Mark Fitzpatrick†	G	34	0	1	1		14
2	Mike McBain	D	27	0	1	1	−10	8
1	Zac Bierk	G	13	0	0	0		0
39	Enrico Ciccone†	D	12	0	0	0	−3	45
25	Allan Egeland	C	8	0	0	0	0	9
16	Troy Mallette†	LW	3	0	0	0	0	7
93	Daren Puppa	G	26	0	0	0		6
32	Corey Schwab	G	16	0	0	0		2
35	Derek Wilkinson	G	8	0	0	0		0

=== Goaltending ===
- † = Joined team via a transaction (e.g., trade, waivers, signing) during the season. Stats reflect time with the Lightning only.

No.	Player	Regular season									
No.	Player	GP	W	L	T	SA	GA	GAA	SV%	SO	TOI
30	Mark Fitzpatrick†	34	7	24	1	975	102	3.16	.895	1	1938
93	Daren Puppa	26	5	14	6	660	66	2.72	.900	0	1456
32	Corey Schwab	16	2	9	1	370	40	2.92	.892	1	821
35	Derek Wilkinson	8	2	4	1	148	17	3.28	.885	0	311
1	Zac Bierk	13	1	4	1	210	30	4.16	.857	0	433

== Awards and records ==
=== Records ===
Tampa Bay set team records for the longest losing streak, 13 games from January 3 to February 2, and the longest winless streak, 16 games from October 10 to November 17 and January 2 to February 5.

=== Milestones ===
Milestone	Player	Date	Ref
First game	Zac Bierk	January 3, 1998	
First game	Mike McBain	January 21, 1998	
First game	Pavel Kubina	March 14, 1998	
First game	Corey Spring	March 14, 1998	

== Draft picks ==
Tampa Bay's draft picks at the 1997 NHL entry draft held at the Civic Arena in Pittsburgh, Pennsylvania.

Round	#	Player	Nationality	College/Junior/Club team (League)
1	7	Paul Mara	United States	Sudbury Wolves (OHL)
2	33	Kyle Kos	Canada	Red Deer Rebels (WHL)
3	61	Matt Elich	United States	Windsor Spitfires (OHL)
5	108	Mark Thompson	Canada	Regina Pats (WHL)
5	109	Jan Sulc	Czech Republic	HC Chemopetrol Jr. (Czech Republic)
5	112	Karel Betik	Czech Republic	Kelowna Rockets (WHL)
6	153	Andrei Skopintsev	Russia	TPS (Finland)
7	168	Justin Jack	Canada	Kelowna Rockets (WHL)
7	170	Eero Somervuori	Finland	Jokerit (Finland)
7	185	Samuel St. Pierre	Canada	Victoriaville Tigres (QMJHL)
8	198	Shawn Skolney	Canada	Seattle Thunderbirds (WHL)
9	224	Paul Comrie	Canada	University of Denver (WCHA)

== See also ==
- 1997–98 NHL season
