= 1997–98 Washington Capitals season =

NHL hockey team season

1997–98 Washington Capitals
- Eastern Conference champions
- Division: 3rd Atlantic
- Conference: 4th Eastern
- 1997–98 record: 40–30–12
- Home record: 23–12–6
- Road record: 17–18–6
- Goals for: 219
- Goals against: 202

Team information
- General manager: George McPhee
- Coach: Ron Wilson
- Captain: Dale Hunter
- Arena: US Airways Arena (Oct.–Nov.); MCI Center (Dec.–Jun.)
- Average attendance: 15,275
- Minor league affiliates: Portland Pirates; Hampton Roads Admirals

Team leaders
- Goals: Peter Bondra (52)
- Assists: Adam Oates (58)
- Points: Peter Bondra (78)
- Penalty minutes: Craig Berube (189)
- Plus/minus: Joe Reekie (+15)
- Wins: Olaf Kolzig (33)
- Goals against average: Olaf Kolzig (2.20)

The 1997–98 Washington Capitals season saw the team reach the Stanley Cup Finals for the first time in club history. Peter Bondra's 52 goals led the team; veterans Dale Hunter, Joe Juneau, and Adam Oates returned to old form; and Olaf Kolzig had a solid .920 save percentage as the Caps got past the Boston Bruins, Ottawa Senators and Buffalo Sabres (the latter on a dramatic overtime win in Game 6 on a goal by Juneau) en route to the team's first Stanley Cup Finals appearance. The Capitals won five overtime games, two against the Bruins and three against Sabres. However, they were no match for the defending cup champs, the Detroit Red Wings, who won in a four-game sweep. It was also the team’s first year at the MCI Center.

== Regular season ==
- Adam Oates, Phil Housley and Dale Hunter, all scored their 1,000th career point, the only time in NHL history that one team had three different players reach that same milestone in a single season.

The Capitals had a very effective penalty kill during the regular season, allowing the fewest power-play goals (39) and finishing with the highest penalty-kill percentage (89.23%).

=== Season standings ===
Atlantic Division
No.	CR		GP	W	L	T	GF	GA	Pts
1	1	**New Jersey Devils**	82	48	23	11	225	166	107
2	3	**Philadelphia Flyers**	82	42	29	11	242	193	95
3	4	**Washington Capitals**	82	40	30	12	219	202	92
4	10	New York Islanders	82	30	41	11	212	225	71
5	11	New York Rangers	82	25	39	18	197	231	68
6	12	Florida Panthers	82	24	43	15	203	256	63
7	13	Tampa Bay Lightning	82	17	55	10	151	269	44

Eastern Conference
R		Div	GP	W	L	T	GF	GA	Pts
**1**	**New Jersey Devils**	**ATL**	**82**	**48**	**23**	**11**	**225**	**166**	**107**
**2**	**Pittsburgh Penguins**	**NE**	**82**	**40**	**24**	**18**	**228**	**188**	**98**
**3**	**Philadelphia Flyers**	**ATL**	**82**	**42**	**29**	**11**	**242**	**193**	**95**
**4**	**Washington Capitals**	**ATL**	**82**	**40**	**30**	**12**	**219**	**202**	**92**
**5**	**Boston Bruins**	**NE**	**82**	**39**	**30**	**13**	**221**	**194**	**91**
**6**	**Buffalo Sabres**	**NE**	**82**	**36**	**29**	**17**	**211**	**187**	**89**
**7**	**Montreal Canadiens**	**NE**	**82**	**37**	**32**	**13**	**235**	**208**	**87**
**8**	**Ottawa Senators**	**NE**	**82**	**34**	**33**	**15**	**193**	**200**	**83**
9	Carolina Hurricanes	NE	82	33	41	8	200	219	74
10	New York Islanders	ATL	82	30	41	11	212	225	71
11	New York Rangers	ATL	82	25	39	18	197	231	68
12	Florida Panthers	ATL	82	24	43	15	203	256	63
13	Tampa Bay Lightning	ATL	82	17	55	10	151	269	44

Divisions: ATL – Atlantic, NE – Northeast

bold – Qualified for playoffs

== Playoffs ==
In the playoffs, the Capitals reached the Conference Finals for the first time since 1990, defeating the Buffalo Sabres in six games before reaching the Stanley Cup Finals where they lost to the Detroit Red Wings in four games.

== Schedule and results ==
=== Regular season ===
1997–98 regular season
October: 7–4–2 (home: 3–1–1; road: 4–3–1)

Game	Date	Score	Opponent	Record	Recap
1	October 1, 1997	4–1	@ Toronto Maple Leafs (1997–98)	1–0–0	W
2	October 3, 1997	6–2	Buffalo Sabres (1997–98)	2–0–0	W
3	October 4, 1997	4–1	New Jersey Devils (1997–98)	3–0–0	W
4	October 8, 1997	6–3	@ New York Islanders (1997–98)	4–0–0	W
5	October 9, 1997	2–5	@ Buffalo Sabres (1997–98)	4–1–0	L
6	October 11, 1997	3–1	New York Islanders (1997–98)	5–1–0	W
7	October 15, 1997	2–0	@ Chicago Blackhawks (1997–98)	6–1–0	W
8	October 24, 1997	3–2	@ Montreal Canadiens (1997–98)	7–1–0	W
9	October 22, 1997	3–4	@ Colorado Avalanche (1997–98)	7–2–0	L
10	October 23, 1997	3–3 OT	@ Phoenix Coyotes (1997–98)	7–2–1	T
11	October 25, 1997	2–5	@ St. Louis Blues (1997–98)	7–3–1	L
12	October 29, 1997	3–4	Dallas Stars (1997–98)	7–4–1	L
13	October 31, 1997	2–2 OT	Philadelphia Flyers (1997–98)	7–4–2	T

November: 6–6–2 (home: 2–2–1; road: 4–4–1)

Game	Date	Score	Opponent	Record	Recap
14	November 1, 1997	1–3	@ New Jersey Devils (1997–98)	7–5–2	L
15	November 4, 1997	2–1	Vancouver Canucks (1997–98)	8–5–2	W
16	November 6, 1997	0–2	@ Boston Bruins (1997–98)	8–6–2	L
17	November 8, 1997	2–1	Edmonton Oilers (1997–98)	9–6–2	W
18	November 9, 1997	2–3	@ Florida Panthers (1997–98)	9–7–2	L
19	November 12, 1997	4–1	@ Pittsburgh Penguins (1997–98)	10–7–2	W
20	November 13, 1997	3–2	@ Buffalo Sabres (1997–98)	11–7–2	W
21	November 15, 1997	3–2	@ Montreal Canadiens (1997–98)	12–7–2	W
22	November 18, 1997	6–6 OT	Colorado Avalanche (1997–98)	12–7–3	T
23	November 22, 1997	2–5	San Jose Sharks (1997–98)	12–8–3	L
24	November 23, 1997	5–2	@ Florida Panthers (1997–98)	13–8–3	W
25	November 26, 1997	5–6	Montreal Canadiens (1997–98)	13–9–3	L
26	November 27, 1997	1–3	@ Ottawa Senators (1997–98)	13–10–3	L
27	November 29, 1997	1–1 OT	@ Boston Bruins (1997–98)	13–10–4	T

December: 4–5–4 (home: 2–3–2; road: 2–2–2)

Game	Date	Score	Opponent	Record	Recap
28	December 2, 1997	3–2 OT	@ New York Rangers (1997–98)	14–10–4	W
29	December 5, 1997	3–2 OT	Florida Panthers (1997–98)	15–10–4	W
30	December 7, 1997	4–5	@ Florida Panthers (1997–98)	15–11–4	L
31	December 10, 1997	3–3 OT	@ San Jose Sharks (1997–98)	15–11–5	T
32	December 12, 1997	4–6	@ Mighty Ducks of Anaheim (1997–98)	15–12–5	L
33	December 13, 1997	2–2 OT	@ Los Angeles Kings (1997–98)	15–12–6	T
34	December 16, 1997	2–2 OT	New York Islanders (1997–98)	15–12–7	T
35	December 18, 1997	0–4	Florida Panthers (1997–98)	15–13–7	L
36	December 20, 1997	2–1	@ Carolina Hurricanes (1997–98)	16–13–7	W
37	December 23, 1997	1–1 OT	New Jersey Devils (1997–98)	16–13–8	T
38	December 26, 1997	1–4	Pittsburgh Penguins (1997–98)	16–14–8	L
39	December 27, 1997	0–3	Ottawa Senators (1997–98)	16–15–8	L
40	December 29, 1997	4–2	St. Louis Blues (1997–98)	17–15–8	W

January: 9–2–2 (home: 6–1–1; road: 3–1–1)

Game	Date	Score	Opponent	Record	Recap
41	January 1, 1998	3–2	Mighty Ducks of Anaheim (1997–98)	18–15–8	W
42	January 3, 1998	2–3	New York Rangers (1997–98)	18–16–8	L
43	January 6, 1998	5–3	Toronto Maple Leafs (1997–98)	19–16–8	W
44	January 8, 1998	5–3	@ New York Rangers (1997–98)	20–16–8	W
45	January 9, 1998	4–1	Philadelphia Flyers (1997–98)	21–16–8	W
46	January 11, 1998	0–2	@ Detroit Red Wings (1997–98)	21–17–8	L
47	January 13, 1998	4–0	Ottawa Senators (1997–98)	22–17–8	W
48	January 15, 1998	3–2	Chicago Blackhawks (1997–98)	23–17–8	W
49	January 21, 1998	3–2 OT	@ Tampa Bay Lightning (1997–98)	24–17–8	W
50	January 25, 1998	4–1	Boston Bruins (1997–98)	25–17–8	W
51	January 26, 1998	2–2 OT	@ New York Rangers (1997–98)	25–17–9	T
52	January 28, 1998	2–2 OT	Pittsburgh Penguins (1997–98)	25–17–10	T
53	January 31, 1998	3–2 OT	@ Philadelphia Flyers (1997–98)	26–17–10	W

February: 0–4–1 (home: 0–3–0; road: 0–1–1)

Game	Date	Score	Opponent	Record	Recap
54	February 1, 1998	2–4	Detroit Red Wings (1997–98)	26–18–10	L
55	February 4, 1998	2–2 OT	@ Pittsburgh Penguins (1997–98)	26–18–11	T
56	February 7, 1998	3–4	Tampa Bay Lightning (1997–98)	26–19–11	L
57	February 25, 1998	3–4	Tampa Bay Lightning (1997–98)	26–20–11	L
58	February 28, 1998	2–5	@ Tampa Bay Lightning (1997–98)	26–21–11	L

March: 8–7–0 (home: 6–2–0; road: 2–5–0)

Game	Date	Score	Opponent	Record	Recap
59	March 1, 1998	0–3	Buffalo Sabres (1997–98)	26–22–11	L
60	March 3, 1998	0–3	Boston Bruins (1997–98)	26–23–11	L
61	March 5, 1998	2–3	@ Philadelphia Flyers (1997–98)	26–24–11	L
62	March 7, 1998	6–3	Florida Panthers (1997–98)	27–24–11	W
63	March 9, 1998	5–2	Calgary Flames (1997–98)	28–24–11	W
64	March 12, 1998	2–1	@ New York Islanders (1997–98)	29–24–11	W
65	March 14, 1998	0–4	@ Ottawa Senators (1997–98)	29–25–11	L
66	March 16, 1998	2–1	Phoenix Coyotes (1997–98)	30–25–11	W
67	March 18, 1998	1–0	Carolina Hurricanes (1997–98)	31–25–11	W
68	March 20, 1998	2–0	New Jersey Devils (1997–98)	32–25–11	W
69	March 21, 1998	2–3	@ New Jersey Devils (1997–98)	32–26–11	L
70	March 25, 1998	2–4	@ Edmonton Oilers (1997–98)	32–27–11	L
71	March 26, 1998	2–3	@ Calgary Flames (1997–98)	32–28–11	L
72	March 28, 1998	3–2	@ Vancouver Canucks (1997–98)	33–28–11	W
73	March 31, 1998	5–2	New York Islanders (1997–98)	34–28–11	W

April: 6–2–1 (home: 4–0–1; road: 2–2–0)

Game	Date	Score	Opponent	Record	Recap
74	April 2, 1998	4–1	Tampa Bay Lightning (1997–98)	35–28–11	W
75	April 4, 1998	3–2	Los Angeles Kings (1997–98)	36–28–11	W
76	April 6, 1998	2–2 OT	Montreal Canadiens (1997–98)	36–28–12	T
77	April 8, 1998	1–2 OT	@ Dallas Stars (1997–98)	36–29–12	L
78	April 11, 1998	3–4	@ Philadelphia Flyers (1997–98)	36–30–12	L
79	April 13, 1998	2–0	@ New York Islanders (1997–98)	37–30–12	W
80	April 14, 1998	3–1	New York Rangers (1997–98)	38–30–12	W
81	April 18, 1998	4–3	@ Carolina Hurricanes (1997–98)	39–30–12	W
82	April 19, 1998	2–1	Carolina Hurricanes (1997–98)	40–30–12	W

Legend: W Win (2 points) L Loss (0 points) T Tie (1 point)

=== Playoffs ===
1998 Stanley Cup playoffs
Eastern Conference Quarterfinals vs. (5) Boston Bruins – Capitals win 4–2

Game	Date	Score	Opponent	Series	Recap
1	April 22, 1998	3–1	Boston Bruins	Capitals lead 1–0	W
2	April 24, 1998	3–4 2OT	Boston Bruins	Series tied 1–1	L
3	April 26, 1998	3–2 2OT	@ Boston Bruins	Capitals lead 2–1	W
4	April 28, 1998	3–0	@ Boston Bruins	Capitals lead 3–1	W
5	May 1, 1998	0–4	Boston Bruins	Capitals lead 3–2	L
6	May 3, 1998	3–2 OT	@ Boston Bruins	Capitals win 4–2	W

Eastern Conference Semifinals vs. (8) Ottawa Senators – Capitals win 4–1

Game	Date	Score	Opponent	Series	Recap
1	May 7, 1998	4–2	Ottawa Senators	Capitals lead 1–0	W
2	May 9, 1998	6–1	Ottawa Senators	Capitals lead 2–0	W
3	May 11, 1998	3–4	@ Ottawa Senators	Capitals lead 2–1	L
4	May 13, 1998	2–0	@ Ottawa Senators	Capitals lead 3–1	W
5	May 15, 1998	3–0	Ottawa Senators	Capitals win 4–1	W

Eastern Conference Finals vs. (6) Buffalo Sabres – Capitals win 4–2

Game	Date	Score	Opponent	Series	Recap
1	May 23, 1998	0–2	Buffalo Sabres	Sabres lead 1–0	L
2	May 25, 1998	3–2 OT	Buffalo Sabres	Series tied 1–1	W
3	May 28, 1998	4–3 OT	@ Buffalo Sabres	Capitals lead 2–1	W
4	May 30, 1998	2–0	@ Buffalo Sabres	Capitals lead 3–1	W
5	June 2, 1998	1–2	Buffalo Sabres	Capitals lead 3–2	L
6	June 4, 1998	3–2 OT	@ Buffalo Sabres	Capitals win 4–2	W

Stanley Cup Finals vs. (W3) Detroit Red Wings – Red Wings win 4–0

Game	Date	Score	Opponent	Series	Recap
1	June 9, 1998	1–2	@ Detroit Red Wings	Red Wings lead 1–0	L
2	June 11, 1998	4–5 OT	@ Detroit Red Wings	Red Wings lead 2–0	L
3	June 13, 1998	1–2	Detroit Red Wings	Red Wings lead 3–0	L
4	June 16, 1998	1–4	Detroit Red Wings	Red Wings win 4–0	L

Legend: W Win L Loss

== Player statistics ==
=== Scoring ===
- Position abbreviations: C = Center; D = Defense; G = Goaltender; LW = Left wing; RW = Right wing
- † = Joined team via a transaction (e.g., trade, waivers, signing) during the season. Stats reflect time with the Capitals only.
- ‡ = Left team via a transaction (e.g., trade, waivers, release) during the season. Stats reflect time with the Capitals only.

No.	Player	Pos	Regular season						Playoffs					
No.	Player	Pos	GP	G	A	Pts	+/-	PIM	GP	G	A	Pts	+/-	PIM
12	Peter Bondra	RW	76	52	26	78	14	44	17	7	5	12	4	12
77	Adam Oates	C	82	18	58	76	6	36	21	6	11	17	8	8
6	Calle Johansson	D	73	15	20	35	−11	30	21	2	8	10	9	16
22	Steve Konowalchuk	LW	80	10	24	34	9	80	—	—	—	—	—	—
90	Joe Juneau	C	56	9	22	31	−8	26	21	7	10	17	6	8
96	Phil Housley	D	64	6	25	31	−10	24	18	0	4	4	−2	4
44	Richard Zednik	RW	65	17	9	26	−2	28	17	7	3	10	0	16
32	Dale Hunter	C	82	8	18	26	1	103	21	0	4	4	−1	30
18	Andrew Brunette	LW	28	11	12	23	2	12	—	—	—	—	—	—
55	Sergei Gonchar	D	72	5	16	21	2	66	21	7	4	11	2	30
24	Mark Tinordi	D	47	8	9	17	9	39	21	1	2	3	6	42
17	Chris Simon	LW	28	7	10	17	−1	38	18	1	0	1	−3	26
13	Andrei Nikolishin	C	38	6	10	16	1	14	21	1	13	14	4	12
8	Jan Bulis	C	48	5	11	16	−5	18	—	—	—	—	—	—
3	Sylvain Cote‡	D	59	1	15	16	−5	36	—	—	—	—	—	—
27	Craig Berube	LW	74	6	9	15	−3	189	21	1	0	1	0	21
10	Kelly Miller	LW	76	7	7	14	−2	41	10	0	1	1	2	4
9	Todd Krygier	LW	45	2	12	14	−3	30	13	1	2	3	−2	6
11	Esa Tikkanen†	LW	20	2	10	12	−4	2	21	3	3	6	−2	20
29	Joe Reekie	D	68	2	8	10	15	70	21	1	2	3	4	20
23	Brian Bellows†	LW	11	6	3	9	−3	6	21	6	7	13	6	6
20	Michal Pivonka	C	33	3	6	9	5	20	13	0	3	3	5	0
19	Brendan Witt	D	64	1	7	8	−11	112	16	1	0	1	−1	14
21	Jeff Toms†	C	33	3	4	7	−11	8	1	0	0	0	−1	0
2	Ken Klee	D	51	4	2	6	−3	46	9	1	0	1	2	10
28	Jeff Brown†	D	9	0	6	6	4	6	2	0	2	2	1	0
34	Jaroslav Svejkovsky	RW	17	4	1	5	−5	10	1	0	0	0	0	2
36	Mike Eagles	LW	36	1	3	4	−2	16	12	0	2	2	1	2
28	Jan Benda	C	9	0	3	3	1	6	—	—	—	—	—	—
38	Nolan Baumgartner	D	4	0	1	1	0	0	—	—	—	—	—	—
48	Benoit Gratton	C	6	0	1	1	1	6	—	—	—	—	—	—
37	Olaf Kolzig	G	64	0	1	1		12	21	0	0	0		4
30	Bill Ranford	G	22	0	1	1		0	—	—	—	—	—	—
25	Brad Church	LW	2	0	0	0	0	0	—	—	—	—	—	—
43	David Harlock	D	6	0	0	0	2	4	—	—	—	—	—	—
42	Dwayne Hay‡	LW	2	0	0	0	0	2	—	—	—	—	—	—
4	Stewart Malgunas	D	8	0	0	0	1	12	—	—	—	—	—	—
26	Ryan Mulhern	C	3	0	0	0	0	0	—	—	—	—	—	—
14	Pat Peake	C	1	0	0	0	0	4	—	—	—	—	—	—

=== Goaltending ===
No.	Player	Regular season										Playoffs								
No.	Player	GP	W	L	T	SA	GA	GAA	SV%	SO	TOI	GP	W	L	SA	GA	GAA	SV%	SO	TOI
37	Olaf Kolzig	64	33	18	10	1729	139	2.20	.920	5	3788	21	12	9	740	44	1.95	.941	4	1351
30	Bill Ranford	22	7	12	2	555	55	2.79	.901	0	1183	—	—	—	—	—	—	—	—	—

== Awards and records ==
=== Awards ===
Type	Award/honor	Recipient	Ref
League (in-season)	NHL All-Star Game selection	Peter Bondra	
League (in-season)	NHL All-Star Game selection	Olaf Kolzig	

=== Milestones ===
Milestone	Player	Date	Ref
First game	Jan Benda	October 1, 1997	
First game	Jan Bulis	October 1, 1997	
First game	Ryan Mulhern	October 25, 1997	
First game	Dwayne Hay	October 31, 1997	
First game	Benoit Gratton	November 12, 1997	
First game	Brad Church	December 16, 1997	
1,000th point	Adam Oates	October 8, 1997	
1,000th point	Phil Housley	November 8, 1997	
1,000th point	Dale Hunter	January 9, 1998	

== Draft picks ==
Below are the Washington Capitals' selections at the 1997 NHL entry draft, held on June 21, 1997 at the Civic Arena in Pittsburgh, Pennsylvania.

Round	#	Player	Pos	Nationality	College/Junior/Club team (League)
1	9	Nick Boynton	D	Canada	Ottawa 67's (OHL)
2	35	Jean-Francois Fortin	D	Canada	Sherbrooke Faucons (QMJHL)
4	89	Curtis Cruickshank	G	Canada	Kingston Frontenacs (OHL)
5	116	Kevin Caulfield	RW	United States	Boston College (NCAA)
6	143	Henrik Petre	D	Sweden	Djurgårdens IF-jr. (Allsvenskan)
8	200	Pierre-Luc Therrien	G	Canada	Drummondville Voltigeurs (QMJHL)
9	226	Matt Oikawa	RW	Canada	St. Lawrence University (NCAA)

== Farm teams ==
Portland Pirates

== See also ==
- 1997–98 NHL season
