= 1997–98 Mighty Ducks of Anaheim season =

NHL team season

1997–98 Mighty Ducks of Anaheim
- Division: 6th Pacific
- Conference: 12th Western
- 1997–98 record: 26–43–13
- Home record: 12–23–6
- Road record: 14–20–7
- Goals for: 205
- Goals against: 261

Team information
- General manager: Jack Ferreira
- Coach: Pierre Page
- Captain: Paul Kariya; Teemu Selanne (interim)
- Alternate captains: Steve Rucchin; Dave Karpa; Teemu Selanne
- Arena: Arrowhead Pond of Anaheim
- Average attendance: 16,908
- Minor league affiliates: Cincinnati Mighty Ducks; Columbus Chill

Team leaders
- Goals: Teemu Selanne (52)
- Assists: Steve Rucchin (36)
- Points: Teemu Selanne (86)
- Penalty minutes: Dave Karpa (217)
- Plus/minus: Paul Kariya (+12); Teemu Selanne (+12)
- Wins: Guy Hebert (13); Mikhail Shtalenkov (13)
- Goals against average: Guy Hebert (2.93)

The 1997–98 Mighty Ducks of Anaheim season was the fifth season in franchise history. The Ducks finished sixth in the Pacific and missed the playoffs.

== Off-season ==
Even though improving and making the Playoffs into the second round getting swept by the Detroit Red Wings, the Mighty Ducks fired Head Coach Ron Wilson on May 20, 1997 replacing him with former Flames Head Coach Pierre Page. Former Coyotes Head Coach Don Hay was hired as an assistant coach.

During the summer only a few changes were made, since the team underwent changes before the trading deadline in March. The Mighty Ducks signed veteran Tomas Sandstrom on August 2 and acquired Scott Young from the Colorado Avalanche for a 1998 3rd round draft pick on September 17, 1997. Brent Severyn joined the Ducks as a free agent from Colorado.

Ruslan Salei earned a regular roster spot on the team. Rookies Matt Cullen, Jeremy Stevenson, Jeff Nielsen and Pavel Trnka also joined the Mighty Ducks.

The Mighty Duck unveiled two alternate jerseys for their 5th anniversary season: one mainly white, the other mainly green.

== Regular season ==
The Mighty Ducks and Vancouver Canucks made NHL history, being the first teams ever to play a regular season game outside the USA or Canada, facing each other back to back in Tokyo splitting the series.

The season would prove to be a roller coaster ride : many players dressed for the team through the first twenty games as the lines looked different almost every night. On November 24, 1997, Shawn Antowski was involved in a serious car accident which left him with a compressed skull fracture. They also started the season without Paul Kariya due to a contract dispute, but played well without him as the Ducks were 11-12-6 until December 2, 1997, but by then the team was on a downturn since November 10 going 3-10-2 until Kariya returned on December 12, 1997. That night had everybody excited as the Ducks came back from being down 3–0 and Kariya scored two goals and an assist helping the Ducks to win after going winless in their last 6 games.

Despite his great performance the Mighty Ducks continued to struggle going 4-10-2 by January 14, 1998. Having a week off, the Mighty Ducks looked to bounce back starting a nice run with a 8–3 win against the Florida Panthers going 4-2-1 in their next seven games. On February 1, 1998 hopes of a turnaround in the second half of the season were shattered as Kariya was cross-checked in the head by Gary Suter resulting in Kariya missing the remainder of the season, playing only 22 games. In hopes of adding some more scoring due to Kariya's injury the Ducks acquired Travis Green along with Doug Houda and Tony Tuzzolino in exchange for J.J. Daigeneault, Joe Sacco and Mark Janssens on February 6, 1998. The team lost seven games in a row in early March but made a push for the post season in late March being undefeated in five games after the team came together following the infamous game against Dallas on March 13, but without their captain and losing Guy Hebert on March 8 due to a severe shoulder injury the team went 7-15-4 after the Olympic break thus missing the Play Offs.

Mikhail Shtalenkov played very well replacing Hebert, appearing in 18 of the last 21 games of the season. It was the first time he was the Mighty Ducks' number one for a longer stretch since playing three games in last year's Play Offs. The Ducks allowed too many goals that season and scored 40 less than last year. The drastic decrease in goals was a result of Kariya's absence, players like Sandstrom, Young, Rycchel, Pronger and Drury scoring less as well as the trade with the Islanders: it saw them losing reliable bottom six scoring from all players, the speed from Sacco, the gritty play of Janssens and the experience of Daigeneault on Defense who was important to their Powerplay. Though Travis Green played quite well for the Ducks, the deal was very lopsided and had many wondered at the time as the deal did not pay off at all. Late season acquisition Josef Marha had Anaheim hoping for next season as he had the most impact after the trading deadline. Several prospects also dressed for the Mighty Ducks showing a lot of scoring talent such as Cullen, Nielsen and especially late season call-up Banham but none of them made an impact that was needed. Their Defense got some young blood as well with Salei and Trnka fulfilling management expectations. Kariya's return didn't have the impact the Mighty Ducks had hoped for, going only 7-12-3 overall, but they improved since mid January when Anaheim defeated Florida 8-3, going 3-2-1. Before Kariya's return, Anaheim was 11-15-6.

The Mighty Ducks were shut out a league high 11 times, tied with the Chicago Blackhawks and the Tampa Bay Lightning.

=== Final standings ===
Pacific Division
No.	CR		GP	W	L	T	GF	GA	Pts
1	2	**Colorado Avalanche**	82	39	26	17	231	205	95
2	5	**Los Angeles Kings**	82	38	33	11	227	225	87
3	7	**Edmonton Oilers**	82	35	37	10	215	224	80
4	8	**San Jose Sharks**	82	34	38	10	210	216	78
5	11	Calgary Flames	82	26	41	15	217	252	67
6	12	Mighty Ducks of Anaheim	82	26	43	13	205	261	65
7	13	Vancouver Canucks	82	25	43	14	224	273	64

Note: CR = Conference rank; GP = Games played; W = Wins; L = Losses; T = Ties; GF = Goals for; GA = Goals against; Pts = Points
Bolded teams qualified for the playoffs.

Western Conference
R		Div	GP	W	L	T	GF	GA	Pts
**1**	**p – Dallas Stars**	**CEN**	**82**	**49**	**22**	**11**	**242**	**167**	**109**
**2**	**x – Colorado Avalanche**	**PAC**	**82**	**39**	**26**	**17**	**231**	**205**	**95**
**3**	**Detroit Red Wings**	**CEN**	**82**	**44**	**23**	**15**	**250**	**196**	**103**
**4**	**St. Louis Blues**	**CEN**	**82**	**45**	**29**	**8**	**256**	**204**	**98**
**5**	**Los Angeles Kings**	**PAC**	**82**	**38**	**33**	**11**	**227**	**225**	**87**
**6**	**Phoenix Coyotes**	**CEN**	**82**	**35**	**35**	**12**	**224**	**227**	**82**
**7**	**Edmonton Oilers**	**PAC**	**82**	**35**	**37**	**10**	**215**	**224**	**80**
**8**	**San Jose Sharks**	**PAC**	**82**	**34**	**38**	**10**	**210**	**216**	**78**
9	Chicago Blackhawks	CEN	82	30	39	13	192	199	73
10	Toronto Maple Leafs	CEN	82	30	43	9	194	237	69
11	Calgary Flames	PAC	82	26	41	15	217	252	67
12	Mighty Ducks of Anaheim	PAC	82	26	43	13	205	261	65
13	Vancouver Canucks	PAC	82	25	43	14	224	273	64

Divisions: CEN – Central, PAC – Pacific

bold – Qualified for playoffs; x – Won Division; p – Won Presidents' Trophy

== Schedule and results ==
1997–98 regular season
October: 5–4–4 (home: 2–3–2; road: 3–1–2)

Game	Date	Score	Opponent	Record	Recap
1	October 3, 1997	2–3	@ Vancouver Canucks (1997–98)	0–1–0	L
2	October 4, 1997	3–2	Vancouver Canucks (1997–98)	1–1–0	W
3	October 10, 1997	1–1 OT	Ottawa Senators (1997–98)	1–1–1	T
4	October 13, 1997	0–3	Boston Bruins (1997–98)	1–2–1	L
5	October 15, 1997	2–2 OT	Philadelphia Flyers (1997–98)	1–2–2	T
6	October 17, 1997	2–1	Edmonton Oilers (1997–98)	2–2–2	W
7	October 19, 1997	2–5	New York Islanders (1997–98)	2–3–2	L
8	October 21, 1997	4–3	@ Phoenix Coyotes (1997–98)	3–3–2	W
9	October 22, 1997	1–4	Detroit Red Wings (1997–98)	3–4–2	L
10	October 25, 1997	4–2	@ New York Islanders (1997–98)	4–4–2	W
11	October 26, 1997	3–3 OT	@ New York Rangers (1997–98)	4–4–3	T
12	October 28, 1997	2–2 OT	@ Toronto Maple Leafs (1997–98)	4–4–4	T
13	October 30, 1997	3–0	@ Boston Bruins (1997–98)	5–4–4	W

November: 6–8–1 (home: 2–4–1; road: 4–4–0)

Game	Date	Score	Opponent	Record	Recap
14	November 2, 1997	3–4	@ Detroit Red Wings (1997–98)	5–5–4	L
15	November 5, 1997	5–2	Tampa Bay Lightning (1997–98)	6–5–4	W
16	November 7, 1997	4–3 OT	@ Calgary Flames (1997–98)	7–5–4	W
17	November 8, 1997	3–2	@ Vancouver Canucks (1997–98)	8–5–4	W
18	November 10, 1997	4–6	San Jose Sharks (1997–98)	8–6–4	L
19	November 12, 1997	3–4 OT	Montreal Canadiens (1997–98)	8–7–4	L
20	November 14, 1997	3–3 OT	Vancouver Canucks (1997–98)	8–7–5	T
21	November 16, 1997	0–4	Dallas Stars (1997–98)	8–8–5	L
22	November 18, 1997	2–4	@ San Jose Sharks (1997–98)	8–9–5	L
23	November 19, 1997	0–4	Chicago Blackhawks (1997–98)	8–10–5	L
24	November 22, 1997	2–0	@ St. Louis Blues (1997–98)	9–10–5	W
25	November 24, 1997	0–5	@ Dallas Stars (1997–98)	9–11–5	L
26	November 26, 1997	2–0	New Jersey Devils (1997–98)	10–11–5	W
27	November 28, 1997	3–1	@ Edmonton Oilers (1997–98)	11–11–5	W
28	November 29, 1997	2–3 OT	@ Calgary Flames (1997–98)	11–12–5	L

December: 2–8–2 (home: 2–4–0; road: 0–4–2)

Game	Date	Score	Opponent	Record	Recap
29	December 2, 1997	3–3 OT	@ Toronto Maple Leafs (1997–98)	11–12–6	T
30	December 3, 1997	0–4	@ Buffalo Sabres (1997–98)	11–13–6	L
31	December 6, 1997	2–5	@ Pittsburgh Penguins (1997–98)	11–14–6	L
32	December 10, 1997	0–3	Pittsburgh Penguins (1997–98)	11–15–6	L
33	December 12, 1997	6–4	Washington Capitals (1997–98)	12–15–6	W
34	December 17, 1997	2–6	Toronto Maple Leafs (1997–98)	12–16–6	L
35	December 19, 1997	2–6	Phoenix Coyotes (1997–98)	12–17–6	L
36	December 21, 1997	2–4	San Jose Sharks (1997–98)	12–18–6	L
37	December 22, 1997	5–1	Calgary Flames (1997–98)	13–18–6	W
38	December 27, 1997	5–5 OT	@ St. Louis Blues (1997–98)	13–18–7	T
39	December 28, 1997	0–2	@ Chicago Blackhawks (1997–98)	13–19–7	L
40	December 30, 1997	1–2	@ Carolina Hurricanes (1997–98)	13–20–7	L

January: 4–7–2 (home: 2–4–1; road: 2–3–1)

Game	Date	Score	Opponent	Record	Recap
41	January 1, 1998	2–3	@ Washington Capitals (1997–98)	13–21–7	L
42	January 3, 1998	4–1	@ Tampa Bay Lightning (1997–98)	14–21–7	W
43	January 4, 1998	3–3 OT	@ Florida Panthers (1997–98)	14–21–8	T
44	January 7, 1998	2–3	Buffalo Sabres (1997–98)	14–22–8	L
45	January 9, 1998	1–5	Edmonton Oilers (1997–98)	14–23–8	L
46	January 11, 1998	2–1 OT	Dallas Stars (1997–98)	15–23–8	W
47	January 12, 1998	2–3 OT	@ Los Angeles Kings (1997–98)	15–24–8	L
48	January 14, 1998	0–2	Colorado Avalanche (1997–98)	15–25–8	L
49	January 21, 1998	8–3	Florida Panthers (1997–98)	16–25–8	W
50	January 22, 1998	4–3	@ Colorado Avalanche (1997–98)	17–25–8	W
51	January 24, 1998	3–3 OT	Los Angeles Kings (1997–98)	17–25–9	T
52	January 27, 1998	2–4	@ San Jose Sharks (1997–98)	17–26–9	L
53	January 28, 1998	2–5	Calgary Flames (1997–98)	17–27–9	L

February: 3–2–0 (home: 2–1–0; road: 1–1–0)

Game	Date	Score	Opponent	Record	Recap
54	February 1, 1998	4–3 OT	Chicago Blackhawks (1997–98)	18–27–9	W
55	February 4, 1998	3–2	New York Rangers (1997–98)	19–27–9	W
56	February 7, 1998	2–5	Los Angeles Kings (1997–98)	19–28–9	L
57	February 25, 1998	2–5	@ Vancouver Canucks (1997–98)	19–29–9	L
58	February 27, 1998	4–0	@ Edmonton Oilers (1997–98)	20–29–9	W

March: 4–9–2 (home: 1–5–0; road: 3–4–2)

Game	Date	Score	Opponent	Record	Recap
59	March 1, 1998	2–6	St. Louis Blues (1997–98)	20–30–9	L
60	March 4, 1998	0–2	Detroit Red Wings (1997–98)	20–31–9	L
61	March 6, 1998	0–3	San Jose Sharks (1997–98)	20–32–9	L
62	March 8, 1998	1–3	Carolina Hurricanes (1997–98)	20–33–9	L
63	March 9, 1998	3–4 OT	@ Los Angeles Kings (1997–98)	20–34–9	L
64	March 11, 1998	1–3	Toronto Maple Leafs (1997–98)	20–35–9	L
65	March 13, 1998	3–6	@ Dallas Stars (1997–98)	20–36–9	L
66	March 15, 1998	5–3	Colorado Avalanche (1997–98)	21–36–9	W
67	March 18, 1998	0–3	@ New Jersey Devils (1997–98)	21–37–9	L
68	March 19, 1998	3–3 OT	@ Philadelphia Flyers (1997–98)	21–37–10	T
69	March 21, 1998	5–4	@ Montreal Canadiens (1997–98)	22–37–10	W
70	March 22, 1998	5–2	@ Ottawa Senators (1997–98)	23–37–10	W
71	March 25, 1998	3–2	@ Chicago Blackhawks (1997–98)	24–37–10	W
72	March 26, 1998	3–3 OT	@ Detroit Red Wings (1997–98)	24–37–11	T
73	March 28, 1998	3–5	@ Colorado Avalanche (1997–98)	24–38–11	L

April: 2–5–2 (home: 1–2–2; road: 1–3–0)

Game	Date	Score	Opponent	Record	Recap
74	April 1, 1998	1–5	Phoenix Coyotes (1997–98)	24–39–11	L
75	April 3, 1998	3–6	@ Phoenix Coyotes (1997–98)	24–40–11	L
76	April 5, 1998	3–3 OT	Calgary Flames (1997–98)	24–40–12	T
77	April 8, 1998	4–2	Edmonton Oilers (1997–98)	25–40–12	W
78	April 9, 1998	2–5	@ San Jose Sharks (1997–98)	25–41–12	L
79	April 13, 1998	2–2 OT	Colorado Avalanche (1997–98)	25–41–13	T
80	April 15, 1998	3–5	@ Edmonton Oilers (1997–98)	25–42–13	L
81	April 18, 1998	4–1	@ Los Angeles Kings (1997–98)	26–42–13	W
82	April 19, 1998	3–5	St. Louis Blues (1997–98)	26–43–13	L

Legend: W Win (2 points) L Loss (0 points) T Tie (1 point)

== Player statistics ==
=== Scoring ===
- Position abbreviations: C = Center; D = Defense; G = Goaltender; LW = Left wing; RW = Right wing
- † = Joined team via a transaction (e.g., trade, waivers, signing) during the season. Stats reflect time with the Mighty Ducks only.
- ‡ = Left team via a transaction (e.g., trade, waivers, release) during the season. Stats reflect time with the Mighty Ducks only.

No.	Player	Pos	Regular season					
No.	Player	Pos	GP	G	A	Pts	+/-	PIM
8	Teemu Selanne	RW	73	52	34	86	12	30
20	Steve Rucchin	C	72	17	36	53	8	13
15	Dmitri Mironov‡	D	66	6	30	36	−7	115
48	Scott Young	RW	73	13	20	33	−13	22
9	Paul Kariya	LW	22	17	14	31	12	23
45	Matt Cullen	C	61	6	21	27	−4	23
10 (Note: Pronger wore number 54 in his first two games.)	Sean Pronger‡	LW	62	5	15	20	−9	30
14	Joe Sacco‡	LW	55	8	11	19	−1	24
17	Tomas Sandstrom	LW	77	9	8	17	−25	64
36	J. J. Daigneault‡	D	53	2	15	17	−10	28
13	Ted Drury	LW	73	6	10	16	−10	82
39	Travis Green†	C	22	5	11	16	−10	16
24	Ruslan Salei	D	66	5	10	15	7	70
33	Dave Karpa	D	78	1	11	12	−3	217
29	Frank Banham	RW	21	9	2	11	−6	12
10	Josef Marha†	LW	12	7	4	11	4	0
16	Warren Rychel‡	LW	63	5	6	11	−10	198
12	Kevin Todd	C	27	4	7	11	−5	12
18	Mark Janssens‡	C	55	4	5	9	−22	116
19	Jeff Nielsen	RW	32	4	5	9	−1	16
23	Jason Marshall	D	72	3	6	9	−8	189
40	Jeremy Stevenson	LW	45	3	5	8	−4	101
7	Pavel Trnka	D	48	3	4	7	−4	40
5	Drew Bannister†	D	27	0	6	6	−2	47
38	Mike Crowley	D	8	2	2	4	0	8
46	Jean-Francois Jomphe	C	9	1	3	4	1	8
22	Brent Severyn	LW	37	1	3	4	−3	133
29	Darren Van Impe‡	D	19	1	3	4	−10	4
21 (Note: Knutsen wore number 47 in his first nine games.)	Espen Knutsen	C	19	3	0	3	−10	6
6	Doug Houda†	D	24	1	2	3	−5	52
52	Peter Leboutillier	RW	12	1	1	2	−3	55
32	Richard Park	C	15	0	2	2	−3	8
4	Jamie Pushor†	D	10	0	2	2	1	10
11	Shawn Antoski	LW	9	1	0	1	1	18
2	Bobby Dollas‡	D	22	0	1	1	−12	27
31	Guy Hebert	G	46	0	1	1		4
35	Mikhail Shtalenkov	G	40	0	1	1		0
34	Dan Trebil	D	21	0	1	1	−8	2
44	Antti Aalto	C	3	0	0	0	−1	0
67	Tom Askey	G	7	0	0	0		0
27	Mike Leclerc	LW	7	0	0	0	−6	6
37	Marc Moro	D	1	0	0	0	0	0
42	Barry Nieckar	LW	1	0	0	0	0	2
36	Tony Tuzzolino†	RW	1	0	0	0	−2	2
50	Bob Wren	LW	3	0	0	0	0	0

=== Goaltending ===
No.	Player	Regular season									
No.	Player	GP	W	L	T	SA	GA	GAA	SV%	SO	TOI
31	Guy Hebert	46	13	24	6	1339	130	2.93	.903	3	2660
35	Mikhail Shtalenkov	40	13	18	5	1031	110	3.22	.893	1	2049
67	Tom Askey	7	0	1	2	113	12	2.64	.894	0	273

== Awards and records ==
=== Awards ===
Type	Award/honor	Recipient	Ref
League (annual)	NHL Second All-Star Team	Teemu Selanne (Right wing)	
League (in-season)	NHL All-Star Game selection	Dmitri Mironov	
League (in-season)	NHL All-Star Game selection	Teemu Selanne (Note: Selanne was voted to the starting lineup.)	

=== Records ===
Teemu Selanne set the franchise record for most goals in one season with 52 goals. The former record was held by Teemu Selanne and it was set the previous year.

=== Milestones ===
Milestone	Player	Date	Ref
First game	Espen Knutsen	October 3, 1997	
First game	Matt Cullen	October 28, 1997	
First game	Pavel Trnka	November 5, 1997	
First game	Antti Aalto	December 6, 1997	
First game	Marc Moro	December 12, 1997	
First game	Mike Crowley	December 28, 1997	
First game	Bob Wren	January 14, 1998	
First game	Tony Tuzzolino	February 25, 1998	
First game	Tom Askey	March 13, 1998	

== Transactions ==
Traded Darren VanImpe to the Boston Bruins in November 1997.

Traded Bobby Dollas to the Edmonton Oilers for Drew Bannister on January 9, 1998.

Traded J.J. Daigneault, Joe Sacco and Mark Janssens to the New York Islanders for Travis Green Doug Houda and Tony Tuzzolino on February 6, 1998.

Acquired Jamie Pushor from the Detroit Red Wings for Dimitri Mironov on March 24, 1998.

Traded Sean Pronger to the Pittsburgh Penguins in exchange for Patrick Lalime on March 24, 1998.

Traded Warren Rychel to the Colorado Avelanche in exchange for Josef Marha on March 24, 1998.

== Draft picks ==
Anaheim's draft picks at the 1997 NHL entry draft held at the Civic Arena in Pittsburgh, Pennsylvania.

Round	#	Player	Nationality	College/Junior/Club team (League)
1	18	Michael Holmqvist	Sweden	Djurgardens IF (Sweden)
2	45	Maxim Balmochnykh	Russia	Lada Togliatti (Russia)
3	72	Jay Legault	Canada	London Knights (OHL)
5	125	Luc Vaillancourt	Canada	Beauport Harfangs (QMJHL)
7	178	Tony Mohagen	Canada	Seattle Thunderbirds (WHL)
7	181	Mat Snesrud	United States	North Iowa Huskies (USHL)
8	209	Rene Stussi	Switzerland	HC Thurgau (Switzerland)
9	235	Tommi Degerman	Finland	Boston University (Hockey East)

== Farm teams ==
Cincinnati Mighty Ducks

== See also ==
- 1997–98 NHL season
