= 1997–98 Dallas Stars season =

Fifth NHL season

1997–98 Dallas Stars
- Presidents' Trophy winners
- Central Division champions
- Division: 1st Central
- Conference: 1st Western
- 1997–98 record: 49–22–11
- Home record: 26–8–7
- Road record: 23–14–4
- Goals for: 242
- Goals against: 167

Team information
- General manager: Bob Gainey
- Coach: Ken Hitchcock
- Captain: Derian Hatcher
- Arena: Reunion Arena
- Average attendance: 16,489
- Minor league affiliates: Michigan K-Wings; Dayton Bombers

Team leaders
- Goals: Joe Nieuwendyk (39)
- Assists: Sergei Zubov (47)
- Points: Joe Nieuwendyk (69)
- Penalty minutes: Pat Verbeek (170)
- Plus/minus: Mike Modano (+25)
- Wins: Ed Belfour (37)
- Goals against average: Ed Belfour (1.88)

The 1997–98 Dallas Stars season was the fifth National Hockey League season in Dallas, Texas (and 31st overall). The most notable aspect of the season was winning the Presidents' Trophy.

== Regular season ==
The Stars tied the Edmonton Oilers for most power-play goals scored, with 77, and had the best power-play percentage in the league, at 20.00%.

=== Final standings ===
Central Division
No.	CR		GP	W	L	T	GF	GA	Pts
1	1	**Dallas Stars**	82	49	22	11	242	167	109
2	3	**Detroit Red Wings**	82	44	23	15	250	196	103
3	4	**St. Louis Blues**	82	45	29	8	256	204	98
4	6	**Phoenix Coyotes**	82	35	35	12	224	227	82
5	9	Chicago Blackhawks	82	30	39	13	192	199	73
6	10	Toronto Maple Leafs	82	30	43	9	194	237	69

Western Conference
R		Div	GP	W	L	T	GF	GA	Pts
**1**	**p – Dallas Stars**	**CEN**	**82**	**49**	**22**	**11**	**242**	**167**	**109**
**2**	**x – Colorado Avalanche**	**PAC**	**82**	**39**	**26**	**17**	**231**	**205**	**95**
**3**	**Detroit Red Wings**	**CEN**	**82**	**44**	**23**	**15**	**250**	**196**	**103**
**4**	**St. Louis Blues**	**CEN**	**82**	**45**	**29**	**8**	**256**	**204**	**98**
**5**	**Los Angeles Kings**	**PAC**	**82**	**38**	**33**	**11**	**227**	**225**	**87**
**6**	**Phoenix Coyotes**	**CEN**	**82**	**35**	**35**	**12**	**224**	**227**	**82**
**7**	**Edmonton Oilers**	**PAC**	**82**	**35**	**37**	**10**	**215**	**224**	**80**
**8**	**San Jose Sharks**	**PAC**	**82**	**34**	**38**	**10**	**210**	**216**	**78**
9	Chicago Blackhawks	CEN	82	30	39	13	192	199	73
10	Toronto Maple Leafs	CEN	82	30	43	9	194	237	69
11	Calgary Flames	PAC	82	26	41	15	217	252	67
12	Mighty Ducks of Anaheim	PAC	82	26	43	13	205	261	65
13	Vancouver Canucks	PAC	82	25	43	14	224	273	64

Divisions: CEN – Central, PAC – Pacific

bold – Qualified for playoffs; x – Won Division; p – Won Presidents' Trophy

== Schedule and results ==
=== Regular season ===
1997–98 regular season
October: 9–4–1 (home: 4–2–0; road: 5–2–1)

Game	Date	Score	Opponent	Record	Recap
1	October 1, 1997	2–2 OT	@ Colorado Avalanche (1997–98)	0–0–1	T
2	October 4, 1997	1–2	St. Louis Blues (1997–98)	0–1–1	L
3	October 7, 1997	4–2	@ Buffalo Sabres (1997–98)	1–1–1	W
4	October 8, 1997	1–3	@ Detroit Red Wings (1997–98)	1–2–1	L
5	October 10, 1997	7–0	Chicago Blackhawks (1997–98)	2–2–1	W
6	October 14, 1997	5–4 OT	Calgary Flames (1997–98)	3–2–1	W
7	October 16, 1997	4–0	Florida Panthers (1997–98)	4–2–1	W
8	October 18, 1997	5–4	@ Toronto Maple Leafs (1997–98)	5–2–1	W
9	October 19, 1997	1–3	@ Ottawa Senators (1997–98)	5–3–1	L
10	October 21, 1997	1–5	Vancouver Canucks (1997–98)	5–4–1	L
11	October 24, 1997	2–0	@ Chicago Blackhawks (1997–98)	6–4–1	W
12	October 25, 1997	3–1	Colorado Avalanche (1997–98)	7–4–1	W
13	October 28, 1997	3–2	@ New York Rangers (1997–98)	8–4–1	W
14	October 29, 1997	4–3	@ Washington Capitals (1997–98)	9–4–1	W

November: 9–3–3 (home: 4–1–2; road: 5–2–1)

Game	Date	Score	Opponent	Record	Recap
15	November 2, 1997	3–3 OT	@ Philadelphia Flyers (1997–98)	9–4–2	T
16	November 3, 1997	4–6	@ Montreal Canadiens (1997–98)	9–5–2	L
17	November 5, 1997	5–2	@ Pittsburgh Penguins (1997–98)	10–5–2	W
18	November 7, 1997	2–2 OT	New York Rangers (1997–98)	10–5–3	T
19	November 10, 1997	1–7	St. Louis Blues (1997–98)	10–6–3	L
20	November 12, 1997	3–3 OT	Boston Bruins (1997–98)	10–6–4	T
21	November 15, 1997	5–1	@ Los Angeles Kings (1997–98)	11–6–4	W
22	November 16, 1997	4–0	@ Mighty Ducks of Anaheim (1997–98)	12–6–4	W
23	November 19, 1997	3–2	Edmonton Oilers (1997–98)	13–6–4	W
24	November 21, 1997	2–4	@ Detroit Red Wings (1997–98)	13–7–4	L
25	November 22, 1997	2–0	@ Boston Bruins (1997–98)	14–7–4	W
26	November 24, 1997	5–0	Mighty Ducks of Anaheim (1997–98)	15–7–4	W
27	November 26, 1997	4–1	Los Angeles Kings (1997–98)	16–7–4	W
28	November 27, 1997	4–1	@ Phoenix Coyotes (1997–98)	17–7–4	W
29	November 29, 1997	5–2	Phoenix Coyotes (1997–98)	18–7–4	W

December: 7–2–3 (home: 4–1–2; road: 3–1–1)

Game	Date	Score	Opponent	Record	Recap
30	December 3, 1997	4–1	Edmonton Oilers (1997–98)	19–7–4	W
31	December 5, 1997	4–1	Calgary Flames (1997–98)	20–7–4	W
32	December 8, 1997	0–3	@ Toronto Maple Leafs (1997–98)	20–8–4	L
33	December 10, 1997	3–0	Tampa Bay Lightning (1997–98)	21–8–4	W
34	December 12, 1997	0–1	San Jose Sharks (1997–98)	21–9–4	L
35	December 15, 1997	8–4	Buffalo Sabres (1997–98)	22–9–4	W
36	December 18, 1997	2–1	@ Calgary Flames (1997–98)	23–9–4	W
37	December 20, 1997	2–1 OT	@ Edmonton Oilers (1997–98)	24–9–4	W
38	December 23, 1997	3–1	@ Vancouver Canucks (1997–98)	25–9–4	W
39	December 27, 1997	3–3 OT	Vancouver Canucks (1997–98)	25–9–5	T
40	December 29, 1997	2–2 OT	@ Detroit Red Wings (1997–98)	25–9–6	T
41	December 31, 1997	2–2 OT	Los Angeles Kings (1997–98)	25–9–7	T

January: 8–4–1 (home: 3–1–1; road: 5–3–0)

Game	Date	Score	Opponent	Record	Recap
42	January 2, 1998	2–1	New York Islanders (1997–98)	26–9–7	W
43	January 3, 1998	6–1	@ Carolina Hurricanes (1997–98)	27–9–7	W
44	January 5, 1998	4–3 OT	@ New Jersey Devils (1997–98)	28–9–7	W
45	January 7, 1998	0–2	Ottawa Senators (1997–98)	28–10–7	L
46	January 9, 1998	3–3 OT	Detroit Red Wings (1997–98)	28–10–8	T
47	January 11, 1998	1–2 OT	@ Mighty Ducks of Anaheim (1997–98)	28–11–8	L
48	January 12, 1998	3–1	@ San Jose Sharks (1997–98)	29–11–8	W
49	January 14, 1998	2–1 OT	@ St. Louis Blues (1997–98)	30–11–8	W
50	January 21, 1998	3–2	Colorado Avalanche (1997–98)	31–11–8	W
51	January 24, 1998	3–2	@ Colorado Avalanche (1997–98)	32–11–8	W
52	January 26, 1998	5–1	Toronto Maple Leafs (1997–98)	33–11–8	W
53	January 29, 1998	2–3	@ Florida Panthers (1997–98)	33–12–8	L
54	January 31, 1998	3–6	@ St. Louis Blues (1997–98)	33–13–8	L

February: 5–0–0 (home: 3–0–0; road: 2–0–0)

Game	Date	Score	Opponent	Record	Recap
55	February 2, 1998	5–1	@ Toronto Maple Leafs (1997–98)	34–13–8	W
56	February 4, 1998	1–0	Philadelphia Flyers (1997–98)	35–13–8	W
57	February 7, 1998	3–1	Chicago Blackhawks (1997–98)	36–13–8	W
58	February 25, 1998	4–1	@ New York Islanders (1997–98)	37–13–8	W
59	February 28, 1998	4–0	Phoenix Coyotes (1997–98)	38–13–8	W

March: 5–5–3 (home: 3–3–2; road: 2–2–1)

Game	Date	Score	Opponent	Record	Recap
60	March 1, 1998	2–2 OT	@ Chicago Blackhawks (1997–98)	38–13–9	T
61	March 4, 1998	1–3	Montreal Canadiens (1997–98)	38–14–9	L
62	March 7, 1998	1–2	@ St. Louis Blues (1997–98)	38–15–9	L
63	March 8, 1998	1–1 OT	Phoenix Coyotes (1997–98)	38–15–10	T
64	March 12, 1998	4–5	@ Phoenix Coyotes (1997–98)	38–16–10	L
65	March 13, 1998	6–3	Mighty Ducks of Anaheim (1997–98)	39–16–10	W
66	March 17, 1998	4–3	@ Los Angeles Kings (1997–98)	40–16–10	W
67	March 18, 1998	3–1	@ San Jose Sharks (1997–98)	41–16–10	W
68	March 20, 1998	6–1	Carolina Hurricanes (1997–98)	42–16–10	W
69	March 22, 1998	0–0 OT	Pittsburgh Penguins (1997–98)	42–16–11	T
70	March 26, 1998	0–1	Toronto Maple Leafs (1997–98)	42–17–11	L
71	March 28, 1998	1–4	San Jose Sharks (1997–98)	42–18–11	L
72	March 29, 1998	3–1	New Jersey Devils (1997–98)	43–18–11	W

April: 6–4–0 (home: 5–0–0; road: 1–4–0)

Game	Date	Score	Opponent	Record	Recap
73	April 1, 1998	1–3	@ Calgary Flames (1997–98)	43–19–11	L
74	April 3, 1998	1–4	@ Edmonton Oilers (1997–98)	43–20–11	L
75	April 4, 1998	3–5	@ Vancouver Canucks (1997–98)	43–21–11	L
76	April 6, 1998	4–2	Toronto Maple Leafs (1997–98)	44–21–11	W
77	April 8, 1998	2–1 OT	Washington Capitals (1997–98)	45–21–11	W
78	April 11, 1998	5–1	@ Tampa Bay Lightning (1997–98)	46–21–11	W
79	April 12, 1998	4–3	St. Louis Blues (1997–98)	47–21–11	W
80	April 15, 1998	3–1	Detroit Red Wings (1997–98)	48–21–11	W
81	April 16, 1998	2–3	@ Phoenix Coyotes (1997–98)	48–22–11	L
82	April 18, 1998	3–1	Chicago Blackhawks (1997–98)	49–22–11	W

Legend: W Win (2 points) L Loss (0 points) T Tie (1 point)

=== Playoffs ===
1998 Stanley Cup playoffs
Western Conference Quarterfinals vs. (8) San Jose Sharks – Stars win 4–2

Game	Date	Score	Opponent	Series	Recap
1	April 22, 1998	4–1	San Jose Sharks	Stars lead 1–0	W
2	April 24, 1998	5–2	San Jose Sharks	Stars lead 2–0	W
3	April 26, 1998	1–4	@ San Jose Sharks	Stars lead 2–1	L
4	April 28, 1998	0–1 OT	@ San Jose Sharks	Series tied 2–2	L
5	April 30, 1998	3–2	San Jose Sharks	Stars lead 3–2	W
6	May 2, 1998	3–2 OT	@ San Jose Sharks	Stars win 4–2	W

Western Conference Semifinals vs. (7) Edmonton Oilers – Stars win 4–1

Game	Date	Score	Opponent	Series	Recap
1	May 7, 1998	3–1	Edmonton Oilers	Stars lead 1–0	W
2	May 9, 1998	0–2	Edmonton Oilers	Series tied 1–1	L
3	May 11, 1998	1–0 OT	@ Edmonton Oilers	Stars lead 2–1	W
4	May 13, 1998	3–1	@ Edmonton Oilers	Stars lead 3–1	W
5	May 16, 1998	2–1	Edmonton Oilers	Stars win 4–1	W

Western Conference Finals vs. (3) Detroit Red Wings – Red Wings win 4–2

Game	Date	Score	Opponent	Series	Recap
1	May 24, 1998	0–2	Detroit Red Wings	Red Wings lead 1–0	L
2	May 26, 1998	3–1	Detroit Red Wings	Series tied 1–1	W
3	May 29, 1998	3–5	@ Detroit Red Wings	Red Wings lead 2–1	L
4	May 31, 1998	2–3	@ Detroit Red Wings	Red Wings lead 3–1	L
5	June 3, 1998	3–2 OT	Detroit Red Wings	Red Wings lead 3–2	W
6	June 5, 1998	0–2	@ Detroit Red Wings	Red Wings win 4–2	L

Legend: W Win L Loss

== Player statistics ==
=== Scoring ===
- Position abbreviations: C = Center; D = Defense; G = Goaltender; LW = Left wing; RW = Right wing
- † = Joined team via a transaction (e.g., trade, waivers, signing) during the season. Stats reflect time with the Stars only.
- ‡ = Left team via a transaction (e.g., trade, waivers, release) during the season. Stats reflect time with the Stars only.

No.	Player	Pos	Regular season						Playoffs					
No.	Player	Pos	GP	G	A	Pts	+/-	PIM	GP	G	A	Pts	+/-	PIM
25	Joe Nieuwendyk	C	73	39	30	69	16	30	1	1	0	1	1	0
9	Mike Modano	C	52	21	38	59	25	32	17	4	10	14	4	12
16	Pat Verbeek	RW	82	31	26	57	15	170	17	3	2	5	−3	26
56	Sergei Zubov	D	73	10	47	57	16	16	17	4	5	9	3	2
15	Jamie Langenbrunner	RW	81	23	29	52	9	61	16	1	4	5	−5	14
5	Darryl Sydor	D	79	11	35	46	17	51	17	0	5	5	5	14
26	Jere Lehtinen	RW	72	23	19	42	19	20	12	3	5	8	0	2
23	Greg Adams	LW	49	14	18	32	11	20	12	2	2	4	4	0
2	Derian Hatcher	D	70	6	25	31	9	132	17	3	3	6	−1	39
21	Guy Carbonneau	C	77	7	17	24	3	40	16	3	1	4	0	6
27	Shawn Chambers	D	57	2	22	24	11	26	14	0	3	3	5	20
33	Benoit Hogue	C	53	6	16	22	7	35	17	4	2	6	0	16
10	Todd Harvey‡	C	59	9	10	19	5	104	—	—	—	—	—	—
29	Grant Marshall	RW	72	9	10	19	−2	96	17	0	2	2	0	47
14	Dave Reid	LW	65	6	12	18	−15	14	5	0	3	3	−2	2
24	Richard Matvichuk	D	74	3	15	18	7	63	16	1	1	2	2	14
12	Bob Errey‡	LW	59	2	9	11	7	46	—	—	—	—	—	—
41	Tony Hrkac‡	C	13	5	3	8	0	0	—	—	—	—	—	—
28	Bob Bassen	C	58	3	4	7	−4	57	17	1	0	1	−3	12
3	Craig Ludwig	D	80	0	7	7	21	131	17	0	1	1	0	22
46	Jamie Wright	LW	21	4	2	6	8	2	5	0	0	0	3	0
12	Mike Keane†	RW	13	2	3	5	0	5	17	4	4	8	7	0
11	Juha Lind	C	39	2	3	5	4	6	15	2	2	4	4	8
6	Dan Keczmer	D	17	1	2	3	5	26	2	0	0	0	0	2
10	Brian Skrudland†	C	13	2	0	2	−2	10	17	0	1	1	0	16
22	Craig Muni†	D	40	1	1	2	0	25	5	0	0	0	−2	4
37	Brad Lukowich	D	4	0	1	1	−2	2	—	—	—	—	—	—
18	Chris Tancill	C	2	0	1	1	−1	0	—	—	—	—	—	—
20	Ed Belfour	G	61	0	0	0		18	17	0	0	0		18
38	Jason Botterill	LW	4	0	0	0	−1	19	—	—	—	—	—	—
34	Petr Buzek	D	2	0	0	0	1	2	—	—	—	—	—	—
17	Patrick Cote	LW	3	0	0	0	−1	15	—	—	—	—	—	—
39	Peter Douris	RW	1	0	0	0	−1	0	—	—	—	—	—	—
30	Manny Fernandez	G	2	0	0	0		0	1	0	0	0		0
4	Sergey Gusev	D	9	0	0	0	−5	2	—	—	—	—	—	—
39	Mike Kennedy†	C	2	0	0	0	1	2	—	—	—	—	—	—
36	Jeff Mitchell	RW	7	0	0	0	0	7	—	—	—	—	—	—
41	Jarrod Skalde†‡	C	1	0	0	0	0	0	—	—	—	—	—	—
1	Roman Turek	G	23	0	0	0		2	—	—	—	—	—	—

=== Goaltending ===
No.	Player	Regular season										Playoffs								
No.	Player	GP	W	L	T	SA	GA	GAA	SV%	SO	TOI	GP	W	L	SA	GA	GAA	SV%	SO	TOI
20	Ed Belfour	61	37	12	10	1335	112	1.88	.916	9	3581	17	10	7	399	31	1.79	.922	1	1039
1	Roman Turek	23	11	10	1	496	49	2.22	.901	1	1324	—	—	—	—	—	—	—	—	—
30	Manny Fernandez	2	1	0	0	35	2	1.74	.943	0	69	1	0	0	0	0	0.00		0	2

== Awards and records ==
=== Awards ===
Type	Award/honor	Recipient	Ref
League (annual)	Frank J. Selke Trophy	Jere Lehtinen	
League (annual)	Lester Patrick Trophy	Neal Broten	
League (in-season)	NHL All-Star Game selection	Ed Belfour	
League (in-season)	NHL All-Star Game selection	Ken Hitchcock (coach)	
League (in-season)	NHL All-Star Game selection	Jere Lehtinen	
League (in-season)	NHL All-Star Game selection	Mike Modano	
League (in-season)	NHL All-Star Game selection	Darryl Sydor	
League (in-season)	NHL All-Star Game selection	Sergei Zubov	
League (in-season)	NHL Rookie of the Month	Roman Turek (February)	
Team	Star of the Game Award	Mike Modano	

=== Milestones ===
Milestone	Player	Date	Ref
First game	Sergei Gusev	October 1, 1997	
First game	Juha Lind	October 1, 1997	
First game	Jeff Mitchell	November 12, 1997	
First game	Jamie Wright	November 16, 1997	
First game	Brad Lukowich	March 4, 1998	
First game	Petr Buzek	March 12, 1998	
First game	Jason Botterill	March 13, 1998	

== Draft picks ==
Dallas's draft picks at the 1997 NHL entry draft held at the Civic Arena in Pittsburgh, Pennsylvania.

Round	#	Player	Nationality	College/Junior/Club team (League)
1	25	Brenden Morrow	Canada	Portland Winter Hawks (WHL)
2	52	Roman Lyashenko	Russia	Torpedo Yaroslavl (Russia)
3	77	Steve Gainey	Canada	Kamloops Blazers (WHL)
4	105	Marcus Kristoffersson	Sweden	Mora IK (Sweden)
5	132	Teemu Elomo	Finland	TPS (Finland)
6	160	Alexei Timkin	Ukraine	Torpedo Yaroslavl (Russia)
7	189	Jeff McKercher	Canada	Barrie Colts (OHL)
8	216	Alexei Komarov	Russia	Torpedo Yaroslavl (Russia)
9	242	Brett McLean	Canada	Kelowna Rockets (WHL)
