= 1997–98 New Jersey Devils season =

National Hockey League season

1997–98 New Jersey Devils
- Atlantic Division champions
- Division: 1st Atlantic
- Conference: 1st Eastern
- 1997–98 record: 48–23–11
- Home record: 29–10–2
- Road record: 19–13–9
- Goals for: 225
- Goals against: 166

Team information
- General manager: Lou Lamoriello
- Coach: Jacques Lemaire
- Captain: Scott Stevens
- Alternate captains: Doug Gilmour; Scott Niedermeyer
- Arena: Continental Airlines Arena
- Average attendance: 17,296
- Minor league affiliates: Albany River Rats; Raleigh IceCaps

Team leaders
- Goals: Bobby Holík (29)
- Assists: Scott Niedermeyer (43)
- Points: Bobby Holik (65)
- Penalty minutes: Krzysztof Oliwa (295)
- Plus/minus: Randy McKay (+30)
- Wins: Martin Brodeur (43)
- Goals against average: Martin Brodeur (1.89)

The 1997–98 New Jersey Devils season was the 24th season for the National Hockey League (NHL) franchise that was established on June 11, 1974, and 16th season since the franchise relocated from Colorado prior to the 1982–83 NHL season. The Devils won the Atlantic Division title with the best record in the Eastern Conference, but were eliminated in the first round of the 1998 Stanley Cup playoffs by the Ottawa Senators.

== Regular season ==
The Devils once again led the NHL in defense, allowing a League-low 166 goals in the 82-game regular season. Although the Devils had the fewest power play opportunities in the League, with just 333, they finished second in power play percentage, with 18.92% (63 for 333).

=== Final standings ===
Atlantic Division
No.	CR		GP	W	L	T	GF	GA	Pts
1	1	**New Jersey Devils**	82	48	23	11	225	166	107
2	3	**Philadelphia Flyers**	82	42	29	11	242	193	95
3	4	**Washington Capitals**	82	40	30	12	219	202	92
4	10	New York Islanders	82	30	41	11	212	225	71
5	11	New York Rangers	82	25	39	18	197	231	68
6	12	Florida Panthers	82	24	43	15	203	256	63
7	13	Tampa Bay Lightning	82	17	55	10	151	269	44

Eastern Conference
R		Div	GP	W	L	T	GF	GA	Pts
**1**	**New Jersey Devils**	**ATL**	**82**	**48**	**23**	**11**	**225**	**166**	**107**
**2**	**Pittsburgh Penguins**	**NE**	**82**	**40**	**24**	**18**	**228**	**188**	**98**
**3**	**Philadelphia Flyers**	**ATL**	**82**	**42**	**29**	**11**	**242**	**193**	**95**
**4**	**Washington Capitals**	**ATL**	**82**	**40**	**30**	**12**	**219**	**202**	**92**
**5**	**Boston Bruins**	**NE**	**82**	**39**	**30**	**13**	**221**	**194**	**91**
**6**	**Buffalo Sabres**	**NE**	**82**	**36**	**29**	**17**	**211**	**187**	**89**
**7**	**Montreal Canadiens**	**NE**	**82**	**37**	**32**	**13**	**235**	**208**	**87**
**8**	**Ottawa Senators**	**NE**	**82**	**34**	**33**	**15**	**193**	**200**	**83**
9	Carolina Hurricanes	NE	82	33	41	8	200	219	74
10	New York Islanders	ATL	82	30	41	11	212	225	71
11	New York Rangers	ATL	82	25	39	18	197	231	68
12	Florida Panthers	ATL	82	24	43	15	203	256	63
13	Tampa Bay Lightning	ATL	82	17	55	10	151	269	44

Divisions: ATL – Atlantic, NE – Northeast

bold – Qualified for playoffs

== Playoffs ==
=== Eastern Conference Quarterfinals ===
The first two games were played at the Meadowlands. In Game 1, Ottawa won 2–1 in overtime, but in Game 2, the Devils were victorious by a score of 3–1. Games 3 and 4 were played in Ottawa. The Senators won Game 3, 2–1, in overtime and Game 4, 4–3. Game 5 was back in New Jersey, where the Devils won 3–1. Game 6 went back to Ottawa, where the Senators won 3–1 and the series 4–2.

== Schedule and results ==
=== Regular season ===
1997–98 regular season
October: 7–4–0 (home: 5–1–0; road: 2–3–0)

Game	Date	Score	Opponent	Record	Recap
1	October 3, 1997	4–3	@ Tampa Bay Lightning (1997–98)	1–0–0	W
2	October 4, 1997	1–4	@ Washington Capitals (1997–98)	1–1–0	L
3	October 8, 1997	4–1	Philadelphia Flyers (1997–98)	2–1–0	W
4	October 10, 1997	1–2	@ Carolina Hurricanes (1997–98)	2–2–0	L
5	October 11, 1997	3–2	Buffalo Sabres (1997–98)	3–2–0	W
6	October 17, 1997	2–4	@ Ottawa Senators (1997–98)	3–3–0	L
7	October 18, 1997	5–0	Tampa Bay Lightning (1997–98)	4–3–0	W
8	October 23, 1997	2–1 OT	Montreal Canadiens (1997–98)	5–3–0	W
9	October 25, 1997	3–4	San Jose Sharks (1997–98)	5–4–0	L
10	October 27, 1997	5–0	@ Philadelphia Flyers (1997–98)	6–4–0	W
11	October 30, 1997	8–1	Vancouver Canucks (1997–98)	7–4–0	W

November: 10–4–0 (home: 5–2–0; road: 5–2–0)

Game	Date	Score	Opponent	Record	Recap
12	November 1, 1997	3–1	Washington Capitals (1997–98)	8–4–0	W
13	November 4, 1997	0–3	Los Angeles Kings (1997–98)	8–5–0	L
14	November 5, 1997	4–2	@ Florida Panthers (1997–98)	9–5–0	W
15	November 8, 1997	2–0	Boston Bruins (1997–98)	10–5–0	W
16	November 10, 1997	3–1	@ New York Islanders (1997–98)	11–5–0	W
17	November 12, 1997	3–2	@ New York Rangers (1997–98)	12–5–0	W
18	November 14, 1997	4–1	Colorado Avalanche (1997–98)	13–5–0	W
19	November 15, 1997	3–2	@ Buffalo Sabres (1997–98)	14–5–0	W
20	November 18, 1997	2–1	Calgary Flames (1997–98)	15–5–0	W
21	November 20, 1997	5–1	New York Islanders (1997–98)	16–5–0	W
22	November 22, 1997	1–2 OT	Florida Panthers (1997–98)	16–6–0	L
23	November 26, 1997	0–2	@ Mighty Ducks of Anaheim (1997–98)	16–7–0	L
24	November 28, 1997	4–2	@ San Jose Sharks (1997–98)	17–7–0	W
25	November 29, 1997	1–4	@ Los Angeles Kings (1997–98)	17–8–0	L

December: 8–3–2 (home: 5–2–0; road: 3–1–2)

Game	Date	Score	Opponent	Record	Recap
26	December 2, 1997	1–3	St. Louis Blues (1997–98)	17–9–0	L
27	December 4, 1997	4–0	@ Pittsburgh Penguins (1997–98)	18–9–0	W
28	December 6, 1997	4–2	Tampa Bay Lightning (1997–98)	19–9–0	W
29	December 10, 1997	4–2	Edmonton Oilers (1997–98)	20–9–0	W
30	December 12, 1997	5–2	Montreal Canadiens (1997–98)	21–9–0	W
31	December 13, 1997	3–0	@ Toronto Maple Leafs (1997–98)	22–9–0	W
32	December 16, 1997	4–3	New York Rangers (1997–98)	23–9–0	W
33	December 18, 1997	4–4 OT	@ St. Louis Blues (1997–98)	23–9–1	T
34	December 19, 1997	4–5	@ Detroit Red Wings (1997–98)	23–10–1	L
35	December 23, 1997	1–1 OT	@ Washington Capitals (1997–98)	23–10–2	T
36	December 26, 1997	4–3	New York Islanders (1997–98)	24–10–2	W
37	December 29, 1997	3–1	@ Buffalo Sabres (1997–98)	25–10–2	W
38	December 30, 1997	2–6	Chicago Blackhawks (1997–98)	25–11–2	L

January: 6–5–4 (home: 5–2–0; road: 1–3–4)

Game	Date	Score	Opponent	Record	Recap
39	January 1, 1998	1–2 OT	@ Florida Panthers (1997–98)	25–12–2	L
40	January 3, 1998	4–2	Toronto Maple Leafs (1997–98)	26–12–2	W
41	January 5, 1998	3–4 OT	Dallas Stars (1997–98)	26–13–2	L
42	January 7, 1998	3–1	Pittsburgh Penguins (1997–98)	27–13–2	W
43	January 9, 1998	4–1	Tampa Bay Lightning (1997–98)	28–13–2	W
44	January 10, 1998	1–4	@ Pittsburgh Penguins (1997–98)	28–14–2	L
45	January 12, 1998	1–1 OT	@ Boston Bruins (1997–98)	28–14–3	T
46	January 14, 1998	4–1	New York Rangers (1997–98)	29–14–3	W
47	January 20, 1998	3–1	Detroit Red Wings (1997–98)	30–14–3	W
48	January 22, 1998	2–3	Pittsburgh Penguins (1997–98)	30–15–3	L
49	January 24, 1998	3–3 OT	@ New York Rangers (1997–98)	30–15–4	T
50	January 25, 1998	3–1	@ Montreal Canadiens (1997–98)	31–15–4	W
51	January 28, 1998	1–1 OT	@ Edmonton Oilers (1997–98)	31–15–5	T
52	January 30, 1998	1–3	@ Vancouver Canucks (1997–98)	31–16–5	L
53	January 31, 1998	2–2 OT	@ Calgary Flames (1997–98)	31–16–6	T

February: 6–0–0 (home: 2–0–0; road: 4–0–0)

Game	Date	Score	Opponent	Record	Recap
54	February 2, 1998	1–0	@ Ottawa Senators (1997–98)	32–16–6	W
55	February 4, 1998	2–0	Ottawa Senators (1997–98)	33–16–6	W
56	February 7, 1998	3–2	@ New York Islanders (1997–98)	34–16–6	W
57	February 25, 1998	3–2	@ Florida Panthers (1997–98)	35–16–6	W
58	February 26, 1998	4–1	@ Tampa Bay Lightning (1997–98)	36–16–6	W
59	February 28, 1998	4–3	Carolina Hurricanes (1997–98)	37–16–6	W

March: 8–3–3 (home: 5–0–1; road: 3–3–2)

Game	Date	Score	Opponent	Record	Recap
60	March 2, 1998	4–3	Philadelphia Flyers (1997–98)	38–16–6	W
61	March 5, 1998	1–1 OT	Boston Bruins (1997–98)	38–16–7	T
62	March 7, 1998	6–3	New York Rangers (1997–98)	39–16–7	W
63	March 9, 1998	2–2 OT	@ New York Rangers (1997–98)	39–16–8	T
64	March 10, 1998	2–2 OT	@ Philadelphia Flyers (1997–98)	39–16–9	T
65	March 12, 1998	2–0	@ Carolina Hurricanes (1997–98)	40–16–9	W
66	March 14, 1998	2–4	@ Montreal Canadiens (1997–98)	40–17–9	L
67	March 18, 1998	3–0	Mighty Ducks of Anaheim (1997–98)	41–17–9	W
68	March 20, 1998	0–2	@ Washington Capitals (1997–98)	41–18–9	L
69	March 21, 1998	3–2	Washington Capitals (1997–98)	42–18–9	W
70	March 24, 1998	3–2	Philadelphia Flyers (1997–98)	43–18–9	W
71	March 26, 1998	2–0	@ Colorado Avalanche (1997–98)	44–18–9	W
72	March 28, 1998	3–0	@ Phoenix Coyotes (1997–98)	45–18–9	W
73	March 29, 1998	1–3	@ Dallas Stars (1997–98)	45–19–9	L

April: 3–4–2 (home: 2–3–1; road: 1–1–1)

Game	Date	Score	Opponent	Record	Recap
74	April 1, 1998	0–4	Carolina Hurricanes (1997–98)	45–20–9	L
75	April 3, 1998	2–3	Ottawa Senators (1997–98)	45–21–9	L
76	April 5, 1998	3–2	Phoenix Coyotes (1997–98)	46–21–9	W
77	April 8, 1998	2–3	@ New York Islanders (1997–98)	46–22–9	L
78	April 11, 1998	3–2	@ Boston Bruins (1997–98)	47–22–9	W
79	April 12, 1998	5–5 OT	Florida Panthers (1997–98)	47–22–10	T
80	April 15, 1998	5–4 OT	Buffalo Sabres (1997–98)	48–22–10	W
81	April 16, 1998	1–1 OT	@ Chicago Blackhawks (1997–98)	48–22–11	T
82	April 18, 1998	1–2	New York Islanders (1997–98)	48–23–11	L

Legend: W Win (2 points) L Loss (0 points) T Tie (1 point)

=== Playoffs ===
1998 Stanley Cup playoffs
Eastern Conference Quarterfinals vs. (8) Ottawa Senators – Senators win 4–2

Game	Date	Score	Opponent	Series	Recap
1	April 22, 1998	1–2 OT	Ottawa Senators	Senators lead 1–0	L
2	April 24, 1998	3–1	Ottawa Senators	Series tied 1–1	W
3	April 26, 1998	1–2 OT	@ Ottawa Senators	Senators lead 2–1	L
4	April 28, 1998	3–4	@ Ottawa Senators	Senators lead 3–1	L
5	April 30, 1998	3–1	Ottawa Senators	Senators lead 3–2	W
6	May 2, 1998	1–3	@ Ottawa Senators	Senators win 4–2	L

Legend: W Win L Loss

== Player statistics ==
=== Scoring ===
- Position abbreviations: C = Center; D = Defense; G = Goaltender; LW = Left wing; RW = Right wing
- † = Joined team via a transaction (e.g., trade, waivers, signing) during the season. Stats reflect time with the Devils only.
- ‡ = Left team via a transaction (e.g., trade, waivers, release) during the season. Stats reflect time with the Devils only.

No.	Player	Pos	Regular season						Playoffs					
No.	Player	Pos	GP	G	A	Pts	+/-	PIM	GP	G	A	Pts	+/-	PIM
16	Bobby Holik	C	82	29	36	65	23	100	5	0	0	0	−4	8
27	Scott Niedermayer	D	81	14	43	57	5	27	6	0	2	2	0	4
93	Doug Gilmour	C	63	13	40	53	10	68	6	5	2	7	4	4
21	Randy McKay	RW	74	24	24	48	30	86	6	0	1	1	−1	0
23	Dave Andreychuk	LW	75	14	34	48	19	26	6	1	0	1	−2	4
26	Patrik Elias	LW	74	18	19	37	18	28	4	0	1	1	−2	0
17	Petr Sykora	RW	58	16	20	36	0	22	2	0	0	0	0	0
14	Brian Rolston	LW	76	16	14	30	7	16	6	1	0	1	2	2
10	Denis Pederson	C	80	15	13	28	−6	97	6	1	1	2	0	2
4	Scott Stevens	D	80	4	22	26	19	80	6	1	0	1	4	8
32	Steve Thomas	LW	55	14	10	24	4	32	6	0	3	3	1	2
24	Lyle Odelein	D	79	4	19	23	11	171	6	1	1	2	2	21
19	Bob Carpenter	C	66	9	9	18	−4	22	6	1	0	1	0	0
25	Jason Arnott†	C	35	5	10	15	−8	21	5	0	2	2	1	0
15	John MacLean‡	RW	26	3	8	11	−6	14	—	—	—	—	—	—
5	Doug Bodger†	D	49	5	5	10	−1	25	5	0	0	0	−5	0
12	Bill Guerin‡	RW	19	5	5	10	0	13	—	—	—	—	—	—
2	Sheldon Souray	D	60	3	7	10	18	85	3	0	1	1	0	2
25	Valeri Zelepukin‡	LW	35	2	8	10	0	32	—	—	—	—	—	—
9	Brendan Morrison	C	11	5	4	9	3	0	3	0	1	1	−1	0
28	Kevin Dean	D	50	1	8	9	12	12	5	1	0	1	−1	2
6	Brad Bombardir	D	43	1	5	6	11	8	—	—	—	—	—	—
18	Sergei Brylin	LW	18	2	3	5	4	0	—	—	—	—	—	—
29	Krzysztof Oliwa	LW	73	2	3	5	3	295	6	0	0	0	0	23
20	Jay Pandolfo	LW	23	1	3	4	−4	4	3	0	2	2	0	0
30	Martin Brodeur	G	70	0	3	3		10	6	0	1	1		0
22	Scott Daniels	LW	26	0	3	3	1	102	1	0	0	0	0	0
18	Peter Zezel‡	C	5	0	3	3	2	0	—	—	—	—	—	—
3	Ken Daneyko	D	37	0	1	1	3	57	6	0	1	1	0	10
1	Mike Dunham	G	15	0	1	1		0	—	—	—	—	—	—
7	Vlastimil Kroupa	D	2	0	1	1	1	0	—	—	—	—	—	—
8	Sasha Lakovic	RW	2	0	0	0	0	5	—	—	—	—	—	—
35	Richard Shulmistra†	G	1	0	0	0		0	—	—	—	—	—	—
31	Peter Sidorkiewicz	G	1	0	0	0		0	—	—	—	—	—	—
33	Reid Simpson‡	LW	6	0	0	0	−2	16	—	—	—	—	—	—
5	Ken Sutton‡	D	13	0	0	0	1	6	—	—	—	—	—	—

=== Goaltending ===
- † = Joined team via a transaction (e.g., trade, waivers, signing) during the season. Stats reflect time with the Devils only.

No.	Player	Regular season										Playoffs								
No.	Player	GP	W	L	T	SA	GA	GAA	SV%	SO	TOI	GP	W	L	SA	GA	GAA	SV%	SO	TOI
30	Martin Brodeur	70	43	17	8	1569	130	1.89	.917	10	4128	6	2	4	164	12	1.97	.927	0	366
1	Mike Dunham	15	5	5	3	332	29	2.25	.913	1	773	—	—	—	—	—	—	—	—	—
31	Richard Shulmistra†	1	0	1	0	30	2	1.94	.933	0	62	—	—	—	—	—	—	—	—	—
35	Peter Sidorkiewicz	1	0	0	0	8	1	3.00	.875	0	20	—	—	—	—	—	—	—	—	—

== Awards and records ==
=== Awards ===
Martin Brodeur was a runner-up for the Vezina Trophy and Patrik Elias was a finalist for the Calder Memorial Trophy.

Type	Award/honor	Recipient	Ref
League (annual)	NHL All-Rookie Team	Patrik Elias (Forward)	
League (annual)	NHL Second All-Star Team	Martin Brodeur (Goaltender)	
League (annual)	NHL Second All-Star Team	Scott Niedermayer (Defense)	
League (annual)	William M. Jennings Trophy	Martin Brodeur	
League (in-season)	NHL All-Star Game selection	Martin Brodeur	
League (in-season)	NHL All-Star Game selection	Bobby Holik	
League (in-season)	NHL All-Star Game selection	Jacques Lemaire (coach)	
League (in-season)	NHL All-Star Game selection	Scott Niedermayer	
League (in-season)	NHL All-Star Game selection	Scott Stevens	
Team	Devils' Players' Player	Doug Gilmour	
Team	Hugh Delano Unsung Hero	Denis Pederson	
Team	Most Valuable Devil	Martin Brodeur	
Team	Three-Star Award	Martin Brodeur	

=== Milestones ===
Milestone	Player	Date	Ref
First game	Brad Bombardir	October 4, 1997	
First game	Sheldon Souray	October 17, 1997	
First game	Brendan Morrison	December 4, 1997	
First game	Richard Shulmistra	January 1, 1998	
25th shutout	Martin Brodeur	December 4, 1997	
600th assist	Scott Stevens	February 7, 1998	

== Draft picks ==
New Jersey's picks at the 1997 NHL entry draft, held in Pittsburgh, Pennsylvania, at the Civic Arena.

Rd #	Pick #	Player	Nat	Pos	Team (league)	Notes
1	24	Jean-Francois Damphousse	Canada	G	Moncton Wildcats (QMJHL)	
2	38	Stanislav Gron	Slovakia	LW	Slovan Bratislava (Slovakia)	(Note: The Devils acquired the 1997 second-round pick from Ottawa for the Devils' 1997 third-round pick (used on Jani Hurme) and the Senators' 1997 third-round pick (used on Josh Langfeld) on June 21, 1997. The Devils had originally received the pick from Ottawa in a trade for Tom Chorske on October 5, 1995. Gron's game with the Devils is the only NHL game in his career. The Devils traded their original 1997 second-round pick, along with Jim Dowd, to Hartford in a trade for Jocelyn Lemieux and a 1998 second-round pick (later transferred to Dallas and used on John Erskine) on December 19, 1995.)
3	78	No third-round pick				(Note: The Devils traded their 1997 third-round pick (later transferred to Colorado and used on Ville Nieminen) to St. Louis for Esa Tikkanen on November 1, 1995.)
4	104	Lucas Nehrling	Canada	D	Sarnia Sting (OHL)	
5	131	Jiri Bicek	Slovakia	LW	HC Košice (Slovakia)	
6	159	Sascha Goc	Germany	D	Schwenninger Wild Wings (Germany)	
7	188	Mathieu Benoit	Canada	RW	Chicoutimi Saguenéens (QMJHL)	
8	215	Scott Clemmensen	United States	G	Des Moines Buccaneers (USHL)	
9	241	Jan Srdinko	Czech Republic	D	? (Czech Republic)	

== Media ==
This was the first season of television broadcast coverage on Fox Sports Net New York.

== See also ==
- 1997–98 NHL season
