= 1997–98 Los Angeles Kings season =

National Hockey League team season

1997–98 Los Angeles Kings
- Division: 2nd Pacific
- Conference: 5th Western
- 1997–98 record: 38–33–11
- Home record: 22–16–3
- Road record: 16–17–8
- Goals for: 227
- Goals against: 225

Team information
- General manager: Dave Taylor
- Coach: Larry Robinson
- Captain: Rob Blake
- Alternate captains: Luc Robitaille; Garry Galley
- Arena: Great Western Forum
- Average attendance: 13,019
- Minor league affiliates: Long Beach Ice Dogs; Fredericton Canadiens; Mississippi Sea Wolves

Team leaders
- Goals: Glen Murray (29)
- Assists: Jozef Stumpel (58)
- Points: Jozef Stumpel (79)
- Penalty minutes: Matt Johnson (249)
- Plus/minus: Jozef Stumpel (+17)
- Wins: Stephane Fiset (26)
- Goals against average: Jamie Storr (2.22)

The 1997–98 Los Angeles Kings season was the Kings' 31st season in the National Hockey League (NHL). The Kings qualified for the playoffs for the first time in five years, losing in the first round to St. Louis in four straight games.

== Regular season ==
On Saturday, April 11, 1998, the Kings scored three short-handed goals in 4-3 win over the Colorado Avalanche.

=== Final standings ===
Pacific Division
No.	CR		GP	W	L	T	GF	GA	Pts
1	2	**Colorado Avalanche**	82	39	26	17	231	205	95
2	5	**Los Angeles Kings**	82	38	33	11	227	225	87
3	7	**Edmonton Oilers**	82	35	37	10	215	224	80
4	8	**San Jose Sharks**	82	34	38	10	210	216	78
5	11	Calgary Flames	82	26	41	15	217	252	67
6	12	Mighty Ducks of Anaheim	82	26	43	13	205	261	65
7	13	Vancouver Canucks	82	25	43	14	224	273	64

Note: CR = Conference rank; GP = Games played; W = Wins; L = Losses; T = Ties; GF = Goals for; GA = Goals against; Pts = Points
Bolded teams qualified for the playoffs.

Western Conference
R		Div	GP	W	L	T	GF	GA	Pts
**1**	**p – Dallas Stars**	**CEN**	**82**	**49**	**22**	**11**	**242**	**167**	**109**
**2**	**x – Colorado Avalanche**	**PAC**	**82**	**39**	**26**	**17**	**231**	**205**	**95**
**3**	**Detroit Red Wings**	**CEN**	**82**	**44**	**23**	**15**	**250**	**196**	**103**
**4**	**St. Louis Blues**	**CEN**	**82**	**45**	**29**	**8**	**256**	**204**	**98**
**5**	**Los Angeles Kings**	**PAC**	**82**	**38**	**33**	**11**	**227**	**225**	**87**
**6**	**Phoenix Coyotes**	**CEN**	**82**	**35**	**35**	**12**	**224**	**227**	**82**
**7**	**Edmonton Oilers**	**PAC**	**82**	**35**	**37**	**10**	**215**	**224**	**80**
**8**	**San Jose Sharks**	**PAC**	**82**	**34**	**38**	**10**	**210**	**216**	**78**
9	Chicago Blackhawks	CEN	82	30	39	13	192	199	73
10	Toronto Maple Leafs	CEN	82	30	43	9	194	237	69
11	Calgary Flames	PAC	82	26	41	15	217	252	67
12	Mighty Ducks of Anaheim	PAC	82	26	43	13	205	261	65
13	Vancouver Canucks	PAC	82	25	43	14	224	273	64

Divisions: CEN – Central, PAC – Pacific

bold – Qualified for playoffs; x – Won Division; p – Won Presidents' Trophy

== Playoffs ==
The Kings were swept by the St. Louis Blues in 4 games in the first round. At home (game 3) LA were leading 3-0, until Storr was run by Geoff Courtnall with 11:27 remaining in the 3rd period. Kings player Sean O'Donnell stuck up for Storr resulting in a 5-minute major for the Blues. St. Louis went on to score 4 PP goals in a 3:07 span. Jamie likely had a concussion or some injury from the charge as his reactions and play were sluggishly uncoordinated contributing to the goals especially the 4th one.

== Schedule and results ==
=== Regular season ===
1997–98 regular season
October: 5–5–4 (home: 3–3–0; road: 2–2–4)

Game	Date	Score	Opponent	Record	Recap
1	October 1, 1997	3–3 OT	@ Pittsburgh Penguins (1997–98)	0–0–1	T
2	October 2, 1997	5–6	@ Boston Bruins (1997–98)	0–1–1	L
3	October 5, 1997	2–2 OT	@ New York Rangers (1997–98)	0–1–2	T
4	October 7, 1997	3–3 OT	@ Carolina Hurricanes (1997–98)	0–1–3	T
5	October 9, 1997	2–3 OT	@ St. Louis Blues (1997–98)	0–2–3	L
6	October 12, 1997	7–4	Ottawa Senators (1997–98)	1–2–3	W
7	October 15, 1997	3–5	Boston Bruins (1997–98)	1–3–3	L
8	October 17, 1997	5–1	Philadelphia Flyers (1997–98)	2–3–3	W
9	October 19, 1997	2–3 OT	Edmonton Oilers (1997–98)	2–4–3	L
10	October 21, 1997	3–2	New York Islanders (1997–98)	3–4–3	W
11	October 23, 1997	1–4	Detroit Red Wings (1997–98)	3–5–3	L
12	October 26, 1997	3–1	@ Tampa Bay Lightning (1997–98)	4–5–3	W
13	October 28, 1997	2–2 OT	@ Florida Panthers (1997–98)	4–5–4	T
14	October 31, 1997	5–1	@ Detroit Red Wings (1997–98)	5–5–4	W

November: 7–4–1 (home: 5–2–0; road: 2–2–1)

Game	Date	Score	Opponent	Record	Recap
15	November 1, 1997	2–4	@ New York Islanders (1997–98)	5–6–4	L
16	November 4, 1997	3–0	@ New Jersey Devils (1997–98)	6–6–4	W
17	November 6, 1997	5–2	Tampa Bay Lightning (1997–98)	7–6–4	W
18	November 8, 1997	1–4	Montreal Canadiens (1997–98)	7–7–4	L
19	November 11, 1997	8–2	Vancouver Canucks (1997–98)	8–7–4	W
20	November 13, 1997	6–3	San Jose Sharks (1997–98)	9–7–4	W
21	November 15, 1997	1–5	Dallas Stars (1997–98)	9–8–4	L
22	November 20, 1997	4–3	Chicago Blackhawks (1997–98)	10–8–4	W
23	November 23, 1997	2–1 OT	@ Colorado Avalanche (1997–98)	11–8–4	W
24	November 26, 1997	1–4	@ Dallas Stars (1997–98)	11–9–4	L
25	November 27, 1997	2–2 OT	@ St. Louis Blues (1997–98)	11–9–5	T
26	November 29, 1997	4–1	New Jersey Devils (1997–98)	12–9–5	W

December: 4–7–2 (home: 2–2–1; road: 2–5–1)

Game	Date	Score	Opponent	Record	Recap
27	December 3, 1997	0–2	@ Montreal Canadiens (1997–98)	12–10–5	L
28	December 4, 1997	2–3	@ Ottawa Senators (1997–98)	12–11–5	L
29	December 6, 1997	2–7	@ Toronto Maple Leafs (1997–98)	12–12–5	L
30	December 9, 1997	1–2	Pittsburgh Penguins (1997–98)	12–13–5	L
31	December 13, 1997	2–2 OT	Washington Capitals (1997–98)	12–13–6	T
32	December 15, 1997	0–7	@ Vancouver Canucks (1997–98)	12–14–6	L
33	December 18, 1997	5–2	Toronto Maple Leafs (1997–98)	13–14–6	W
34	December 20, 1997	4–1	@ Calgary Flames (1997–98)	14–14–6	W
35	December 22, 1997	1–0	@ Chicago Blackhawks (1997–98)	15–14–6	W
36	December 23, 1997	1–5	@ Colorado Avalanche (1997–98)	15–15–6	L
37	December 27, 1997	2–4	Phoenix Coyotes (1997–98)	15–16–6	L
38	December 29, 1997	5–2	Vancouver Canucks (1997–98)	16–16–6	W
39	December 31, 1997	2–2 OT	@ Dallas Stars (1997–98)	16–16–7	T

January: 7–3–2 (home: 5–1–1; road: 2–2–1)

Game	Date	Score	Opponent	Record	Recap
40	January 1, 1998	0–4	@ Phoenix Coyotes (1997–98)	16–17–7	L
41	January 4, 1998	3–2	@ Edmonton Oilers (1997–98)	17–17–7	W
42	January 5, 1998	2–3	@ Vancouver Canucks (1997–98)	17–18–7	L
43	January 8, 1998	2–2 OT	Buffalo Sabres (1997–98)	17–18–8	T
44	January 10, 1998	3–4	Edmonton Oilers (1997–98)	17–19–8	L
45	January 12, 1998	3–2 OT	Mighty Ducks of Anaheim (1997–98)	18–19–8	W
46	January 14, 1998	4–2	@ San Jose Sharks (1997–98)	19–19–8	W
47	January 20, 1998	4–3	Calgary Flames (1997–98)	20–19–8	W
48	January 22, 1998	3–1	Florida Panthers (1997–98)	21–19–8	W
49	January 24, 1998	3–3 OT	@ Mighty Ducks of Anaheim (1997–98)	21–19–9	T
50	January 29, 1998	5–3	Calgary Flames (1997–98)	22–19–9	W
51	January 31, 1998	3–0	Chicago Blackhawks (1997–98)	23–19–9	W

February: 4–2–1 (home: 1–1–0; road: 3–1–1)

Game	Date	Score	Opponent	Record	Recap
52	February 2, 1998	0–1	@ Edmonton Oilers (1997–98)	23–20–9	L
53	February 3, 1998	6–3	@ Calgary Flames (1997–98)	24–20–9	W
54	February 5, 1998	3–1	New York Rangers (1997–98)	25–20–9	W
55	February 7, 1998	5–2	@ Mighty Ducks of Anaheim (1997–98)	26–20–9	W
56	February 25, 1998	1–1 OT	@ Detroit Red Wings (1997–98)	26–20–10	T
57	February 26, 1998	7–4	@ Chicago Blackhawks (1997–98)	27–20–10	W
58	February 28, 1998	2–5	St. Louis Blues (1997–98)	27–21–10	L

March: 7–6–1 (home: 4–4–1; road: 3–2–0)

Game	Date	Score	Opponent	Record	Recap
59	March 2, 1998	2–2 OT	Vancouver Canucks (1997–98)	27–21–11	T
60	March 5, 1998	1–2	Carolina Hurricanes (1997–98)	27–22–11	L
61	March 7, 1998	2–1	Detroit Red Wings (1997–98)	28–22–11	W
62	March 9, 1998	4–3 OT	Mighty Ducks of Anaheim (1997–98)	29–22–11	W
63	March 10, 1998	4–3	@ Phoenix Coyotes (1997–98)	30–22–11	W
64	March 12, 1998	1–2	Toronto Maple Leafs (1997–98)	30–23–11	L
65	March 14, 1998	5–2	Colorado Avalanche (1997–98)	31–23–11	W
66	March 16, 1998	1–2	@ San Jose Sharks (1997–98)	31–24–11	L
67	March 17, 1998	3–4	Dallas Stars (1997–98)	31–25–11	L
68	March 21, 1998	3–2	Phoenix Coyotes (1997–98)	32–25–11	W
69	March 24, 1998	4–3	@ San Jose Sharks (1997–98)	33–25–11	W
70	March 26, 1998	2–5	San Jose Sharks (1997–98)	33–26–11	L
71	March 28, 1998	2–5	@ Calgary Flames (1997–98)	33–27–11	L
72	March 30, 1998	3–2	@ Toronto Maple Leafs (1997–98)	34–27–11	W

April: 4–6–0 (home: 2–3–0; road: 2–3–0)

Game	Date	Score	Opponent	Record	Recap
73	April 1, 1998	0–4	@ Buffalo Sabres (1997–98)	34–28–11	L
74	April 2, 1998	0–3	@ Philadelphia Flyers (1997–98)	34–29–11	L
75	April 4, 1998	2–3	@ Washington Capitals (1997–98)	34–30–11	L
76	April 6, 1998	3–1	@ Colorado Avalanche (1997–98)	35–30–11	W
77	April 9, 1998	0–4	Edmonton Oilers (1997–98)	35–31–11	L
78	April 11, 1998	4–3	Colorado Avalanche (1997–98)	36–31–11	W
79	April 13, 1998	4–2	Calgary Flames (1997–98)	37–31–11	W
80	April 15, 1998	2–0	@ Vancouver Canucks (1997–98)	38–31–11	W
81	April 16, 1998	3–7	St. Louis Blues (1997–98)	38–32–11	L
82	April 18, 1998	1–4	Mighty Ducks of Anaheim (1997–98)	38–33–11	L

Legend: W Win (2 points) L Loss (0 points) T Tie (1 point)

=== Playoffs ===
1998 Stanley Cup playoffs
Western Conference Quarterfinals vs. (4) St. Louis Blues: Blues win 4–0

Game	Date	Score	Opponent	Series	Recap
1	April 23, 1998	3–8	@ St. Louis Blues	Blues lead 1–0	L
2	April 25, 1998	1–2	@ St. Louis Blues	Blues lead 2–0	L
3	April 27, 1998	3–4	St. Louis Blues	Blues lead 3–0	L
4	April 29, 1998	1–2	St. Louis Blues	Blues win 4–0	L

Legend: W Win L Loss

== Player statistics ==
=== Scoring ===
- Position abbreviations: C = Center; D = Defense; G = Goaltender; LW = Left wing; RW = Right wing
- † = Joined team via a transaction (e.g., trade, waivers, signing) during the season. Stats reflect time with the Kings only.
- ‡ = Left team via a transaction (e.g., trade, waivers, release) during the season. Stats reflect time with the Kings only.

No.	Player	Pos	Regular season						Playoffs					
No.	Player	Pos	GP	G	A	Pts	+/-	PIM	GP	G	A	Pts	+/-	PIM
15	Jozef Stumpel	C	77	21	58	79	17	53	4	1	2	3	2	2
27	Glen Murray	RW	81	29	31	60	6	54	4	2	0	2	2	6
9	Vladimir Tsyplakov	LW	73	18	34	52	15	18	4	0	1	1	−1	8
4	Rob Blake	D	81	23	27	50	−3	94	4	0	0	0	−4	6
44	Yanic Perreault	C	79	28	20	48	6	32	4	1	2	3	−1	6
20	Luc Robitaille	LW	57	16	24	40	5	66	4	1	2	3	1	6
23	Craig Johnson	LW	74	17	21	38	9	42	4	1	0	1	0	4
3	Garry Galley	D	74	9	28	37	−5	63	4	0	1	1	−2	2
45	Sandy Moger	C	62	11	13	24	4	70	—	—	—	—	—	—
22	Ian Laperriere	RW	77	6	15	21	0	131	4	1	0	1	0	6
19	Russ Courtnall†	RW	58	12	6	18	−2	27	4	0	0	0	−2	2
6	Sean O'Donnell	D	80	2	15	17	7	179	4	1	0	1	1	36
28	Philippe Boucher	D	45	6	10	16	6	49	—	—	—	—	—	—
26	Ray Ferraro	C	40	6	9	15	−10	42	3	0	1	1	1	2
14	Mattias Norstrom	D	73	1	12	13	14	90	4	0	0	0	−1	2
42	Dan Bylsma	RW	65	3	9	12	9	33	2	0	0	0	−3	0
24	Nathan LaFayette	C	34	5	3	8	2	32	4	0	0	0	−2	2
7	Steve McKenna	LW	62	4	4	8	−9	150	3	0	1	1	1	8
5	Aki Berg	D	72	0	8	8	3	61	4	0	3	3	3	0
2	Doug Zmolek	D	46	0	8	8	0	111	2	0	0	0	0	2
10	Donald MacLean	C	22	5	2	7	−1	4	—	—	—	—	—	—
17	Matt Johnson	LW	66	2	4	6	−8	249	4	0	0	0	−1	6
33	Jan Vopat	D	21	1	5	6	8	10	2	0	1	1	1	2
11	Brad Smyth‡	RW	9	1	3	4	−1	4	—	—	—	—	—	—
12	Roman Vopat	C	25	0	3	3	−7	55	—	—	—	—	—	—
52	Jason Morgan	C	11	1	0	1	−7	4	—	—	—	—	—	—
35	Stephane Fiset	G	60	0	1	1		8	2	0	0	0		0
43	Vitali Yachmenev	LW	4	0	1	1	1	4	—	—	—	—	—	—
31	Frederic Chabot	G	12	0	0	0		0	—	—	—	—	—	—
21	Olli Jokinen	C	8	0	0	0	−5	6	—	—	—	—	—	—
1	Jamie Storr	G	17	0	0	0		0	3	0	0	0		0

=== Goaltending ===
No.	Player	Regular season										Playoffs								
No.	Player	GP	W	L	T	SA	GA	GAA	SV%	SO	TOI	GP	W	L	SA	GA	GAA	SV%	SO	TOI
35	Stephane Fiset	60	26	25	8	1728	158	2.71	.909	2	3497	2	0	2	61	7	4.52	.885	0	93
1	Jamie Storr	17	9	5	1	482	34	2.22	.929	2	920	3	0	2	77	9	3.72	.883	0	145
31	Frederic Chabot	12	3	3	2	267	29	3.14	.891	0	554	—	—	—	—	—	—	—	—	—

== Awards and records ==
=== Awards ===
Type	Award/honor	Recipient	Ref
League (annual)	James Norris Memorial Trophy	Rob Blake	
League (annual)	NHL All-Rookie Team	Jamie Storr (Goaltender)	
League (annual)	NHL First All-Star Team	Rob Blake (Defense)	
Team	Best Newcomer	Jozef Stumpel	
Team	Bill Libby Memorial Award	Rob Blake	
Team	Defensive Player	Ian Laperriere	
Team	Jim Fox Community Service	Luc Robitaille	
Team	Leading Scorer	Jozef Stumpel	
Team	Most Inspirational	Rob Blake	
Team	Most Popular Player	Rob Blake	
Team	Outstanding Defenseman	Rob Blake	
Team	Unsung Hero	Mattias Norstrom	

=== Milestones ===
Milestone	Player	Date	Ref
First game	Olli Jokinen	October 1, 1997	
First game	Donald MacLean	October 1, 1997	
1,000th point	Luc Robitaille	January 29, 1998	

== Transactions ==
The Kings were involved in the following transactions during the 1997–98 season.

=== Trades ===
August 28, 1997	To Los Angeles Kings Luc Robitaille	To New York Rangers Kevin Stevens
August 29, 1997	To Los Angeles Kings Jozef Stümpel; Sandy Moger; 4th round pick in 1998 - Pierre Dagenais	To Boston Bruins Byron Dafoe; Dmitri Khristich
November 14, 1997	To Los Angeles Kings Future considerations	To New York Rangers Brad Smyth

=== Free agent signings ===
July 5, 1997	From Buffalo Sabres Garry Galley (3 years, $4.8 million)
July 18, 1997	From Milwaukee Admirals (IHL) Mark Visheau
July 25, 1997	From New York Islanders Chris Taylor
September 3, 1997	From Florida Panthers Frédéric Chabot
November 7, 1997	From New York Rangers Russ Courtnall (1 year, $940,000)

=== Free agents lost ===
August 11, 1997	To Buffalo Sabres Patrice Tardif
August 15, 1997	To San Jose Sharks Barry Potomski
August 18, 1997	To Phoenix Coyotes John Slaney (1 year, $350,000)
September 4, 1997	To Phoenix Coyotes Brad Tiley

== Draft picks ==
Los Angeles's draft picks at the 1997 NHL entry draft held at the Civic Arena in Pittsburgh, Pennsylvania.

Round	#	Player	Nationality	College/Junior/Club team (League)
1	3	Olli Jokinen	Finland	HIFK (Finland)
1	15	Matt Zultek	Canada	Ottawa 67's (OHL)
2	29	Scott Barney	Canada	Peterborough Petes (OHL)
4	83	Joe Corvo	United States	Western Michigan University (CCHA)
4	99	Sean Blanchard	Canada	Ottawa 67's (OHL)
6	137	Richard Seeley	Canada	Prince Albert Raiders (WHL)
6	150	Jeff Katcher	Canada	Brandon Wheat Kings (WHL)
8	193	Jay Kopischke	United States	North Iowa Huskies (USHL)
9	220	Konrad Brand	Canada	Medicine Hat Tigers (WHL)

== See also ==
- 1997–98 NHL season
