= Chris Kenady =

American ice hockey player (born 1973)

- Born: April 10, 1973 (age 52) Mound, Minnesota, U.S.
- Height: 6 ft 2 in (188 cm)
- Weight: 195 lb (88 kg; 13 st 13 lb)
- Position: Right wing
- Shot: Right
- Played for: St. Louis Blues; New York Rangers
- NHL draft: 175th overall, 1991; St. Louis Blues
- Playing career: 1995–2006

Christopher Douglas Kenady (born April 10, 1973) is an American former professional ice hockey winger.

== Early life ==
Kenady was born in Mound, Minnesota. Prior to turning professional, he played college hockey at the University of Denver from 1991 to 1995.

== Career ==
Kenady played seven games in the National Hockey League (NHL) with the New York Rangers and St. Louis Blues during the 1997–98 and 1999–00 seasons. The rest of his career, which lasted from 1995 to 2006, was spent in the minor leagues.

== Career statistics ==
=== Regular season and playoffs ===
			Regular season					Playoffs
Season	Team	League	GP	G	A	Pts	PIM	GP	G	A	Pts	PIM
1989–90	Mound Westonka High School	HS-MN	—	—	—	—	—	—	—	—	—	—
1990–91	St. Paul Vulcans	USHL	45	16	20	36	57	—	—	—	—	—
1991–92	University of Denver	WCHA	36	8	5	13	56	—	—	—	—	—
1992–93	University of Denver	WCHA	38	8	16	24	95	—	—	—	—	—
1993–94	University of Denver	WCHA	37	14	11	25	125	—	—	—	—	—
1994–95	University of Denver	WCHA	39	21	17	38	113	—	—	—	—	—
1995–96	Worcester IceCats	AHL	43	9	10	19	58	2	0	0	0	0
1996–97	Worcester IceCats	AHL	73	23	26	49	131	5	0	1	1	2
1997–98	St. Louis Blues	NHL	5	0	2	2	0	—	—	—	—	—
1997–98	Worcester IceCats	AHL	63	23	22	45	84	11	1	5	6	26
1998–99	Utah Grizzlies	IHL	35	7	6	13	68	—	—	—	—	—
1998–99	Long Beach Ice Dogs	IHL	19	1	6	7	47	—	—	—	—	—
1998–99	Hartford Wolf Pack	AHL	22	2	6	8	52	2	0	1	1	6
1999–00	New York Rangers	NHL	2	0	0	0	0	—	—	—	—	—
1999–00	Hartford Wolf Pack	AHL	71	15	16	31	196	21	8	3	11	40
2000–01	Louisville Panthers	AHL	20	2	1	3	36	—	—	—	—	—
2000–01	Hartford Wolf Pack	AHL	42	5	12	17	58	5	2	0	2	7
2001–02	Long Beach Ice Dogs	WCHL	68	35	34	69	161	5	4	0	4	4
2002–03	Long Beach Ice Dogs	WCHL	27	16	13	29	66	—	—	—	—	—
2002–03	Fresno Falcons	WCHL	5	0	1	1	10	—	—	—	—	—
2003–04	Las Vegas Wranglers	ECHL	71	21	38	59	152	5	3	1	4	4
2004–05	Long Beach Ice Dogs	ECHL	71	32	32	64	88	7	3	4	7	4
2005–06	Long Beach Ice Dogs	ECHL	40	13	17	30	56	—	—	—	—	—
2005–06	Las Vegas Wranglers	ECHL	7	0	3	3	6	6	1	0	1	6
AHL totals			334	79	93	172	615	46	11	10	21	81
NHL totals			7	0	2	2	0	—	—	—	—	—
