= Corey Spring =

Canadian ice hockey player

- Born: May 31, 1971 (age 54) Cranbrook, British Columbia, Canada
- Height: 6 ft 4 in (193 cm)
- Weight: 220 lb (100 kg; 15 st 10 lb)
- Position: Right wing
- Shot: Right
- Played for: Tampa Bay Lightning
- NHL draft: Undrafted
- Playing career: 1995–2004

Corey Spring (born May 31, 1971) is a Canadian former professional ice hockey player who played 16 games for the Tampa Bay Lightning of the National Hockey League.

== Playing career ==
Born in Cranbrook, British Columbia, Spring began his career in the British Columbia Junior Hockey League with the Vernon Lakers before spending four years with the University of Alaska Fairbanks. He turned pro in 1995 with the International Hockey League's Atlanta Knights. After two high-scoring seasons in the American Hockey League with the Adirondack Red Wings, Spring made his NHL debut for the Lightning during the 1997-98 NHL season, playing eight games in all and scoring one goal. He played another eight games the next season for Tampa Bay, with one assist to his credit. He went on to have spells in the IHL for the Cleveland Lumberjacks, Detroit Vipers, and Manitoba Moose. He moved to Europe with a brief spell in Germany's Deutsche Eishockey Liga for the Augsburger Panther before spending a season in the British Ice Hockey Superleague with the Manchester Storm. He left the Storm mid-season to return to the United States, joining the Long Beach Ice Dogs of the West Coast Hockey League. He returned to Europe in 2001, joining German 2nd Bundesliga side EC Bad Tölz. He returned to the British Superleague in 2002 with the Bracknell Bees in what turned out to be the league's final year in existence. After the Superleague folded, Spring spent one final year in Germany with Oberliga team ERC Selb before retiring in 2004.

== Personal life ==
He is the son of Frank Spring who played in the NHL in the 1970s for the Boston Bruins, St.Louis Blues, California Golden Seals, and Cleveland Barons.

== Career statistics ==
=== Regular season and playoffs ===
			Regular season					Playoffs
Season	Team	League	GP	G	A	Pts	PIM	GP	G	A	Pts	PIM
1991–92	University of Alaska-Fairbanks	GWHC	35	3	8	11	30	—	—	—	—	—
1992–93	University of Alaska-Fairbanks	CCHA	28	5	5	10	20	—	—	—	—	—
1993–94	University of Alaska-Fairbanks	CCHA	38	19	18	37	34	—	—	—	—	—
1994–95	University of Alaska-Fairbanks	CCHA	33	18	15	33	56	—	—	—	—	—
1995–96	Atlanta Knights	IHL	73	14	14	28	140	2	0	0	0	0
1996–97	Adirondack Red Wings	AHL	69	20	26	46	118	4	0	0	0	14
1997–98	Adirondack Red Wings	AHL	57	19	25	44	120	3	0	0	0	6
1997–98	Tampa Bay Lightning	NHL	8	1	0	1	10	—	—	—	—	—
1998–99	Cleveland Lumberjacks	IHL	48	18	10	28	98	—	—	—	—	—
1998–99	Tampa Bay Lightning	NHL	8	0	1	1	2	—	—	—	—	—
1999–00	Augsburger Panther	DEL	7	2	0	2	10	—	—	—	—	—
1999–00	Detroit Vipers	IHL	22	5	4	9	48	—	—	—	—	—
1999–00	Manitoba Moose	IHL	8	2	2	4	8	—	—	—	—	—
2000–01	Manchester Storm	BISL	37	8	11	19	87	—	—	—	—	—
2000–01	Long Beach Ice Dogs	WCHL	15	6	6	12	20	7	4	4	8	18
2001–02	EC Bad Tölz	2.GBun	36	16	20	36	103	3	1	0	1	4
2002–03	Bracknell Bees	BISL	26	3	3	6	16	16	4	1	5	12
2003–04	ERC Selb	GerObl	47	34	29	63	157	—	—	—	—	—
NHL totals			16	1	1	2	12	—	—	—	—	—
