= 1997–98 NHL transactions =

This list is for 1997–98 NHL transactions within professional ice hockey league of players in North America. The following contains team-to-team transactions that occurred in the National Hockey League during the 1997–98 NHL season. It lists what team each player has been traded to, or claimed by, and for which players or draft picks, if applicable.

== May ==
| Date | | | References |
|---|---|---|---|
| May 30, 1997 | To St. Louis Blues Brent Johnson | To Colorado Avalanche 3rd-rd pick – 1997 entry draft (# 55 – Rick Berry) conditional 3rd-rd pick – 2000 entry draft^{1} | |

1. Conditions of this draft pick are unknown Colorado made no pick selection belonging to St. Louis in the 2000 entry draft.

== June ==
| Date | | | References |
|---|---|---|---|
| June 12, 1997 | To Toronto Maple Leafs Per Gustafsson | To Florida Panthers Mike Lankshear | |
| June 18, 1997 | To Edmonton Oilers 7th-rd pick - 1997 entry draft (# 187 - Chad Hinz) | To Philadelphia Flyers rights to Martin Cerven | |
| June 21, 1997 | To San Jose Sharks 1st-rd pick - 1997 entry draft (# 23 - Scott Hannan) | To Carolina Hurricanes 2nd-rd pick - 1997 entry draft (# 28 - Brad DeFauw); 3rd-rd pick - 1998 entry draft (# 71 - Erik Cole) | |
| June 21, 1997 | To New Jersey Devils 2nd-rd pick - 1997 entry draft (# 38 - Stanislav Gron) | To Ottawa Senators 3rd-rd pick - 1997 entry draft (# 58 - Jani Hurme); 3rd-rd pick - 1997 entry draft (# 66 - Josh Langfeld) | |
| June 21, 1997 | To Dallas Stars 3rd-rd pick - 1997 entry draft (# 77 - Steve Gainey) | To Philadelphia Flyers 2nd-rd pick - 1998 entry draft (OTT - # 58 - Chris Bala)^{1} | |
| June 21, 1997 | To St. Louis Blues 4th-rd pick - 1997 entry draft (# 98 - Jan Horacek); 4th-rd pick - 1997 entry draft (# 106 - Jame Pollock) | To Colorado Avalanche 3rd-rd pick - 1997 entry draft (# 78 - Ville Nieminen); 5th-rd pick - 1998 entry draft (# 141 - K.C. Timmons) | |
| June 21, 1997 | To San Jose Sharks 4th-rd pick - 1997 entry draft (# 82 - Adam Colagiacomo) | To New York Rangers 4th-rd pick - 1997 entry draft (# 93 - Tomi Kallarsson); 6th-rd pick - 1997 entry draft (# 136 - Mike York) | |
| June 21, 1997 | To San Jose Sharks Shawn Burr | To Tampa Bay Lightning 5th-rd pick - 1997 entry draft (# 108 - Mark Thompson) | |
| June 21, 1997 | To Boston Bruins 9th-rd pick - 1997 entry draft (# 245 - Steve Lafleur) | To Colorado Avalanche 9th-rd pick - 1997 entry draft (# 246 - Jay Henderson) | |
| June 21, 1997 | To Calgary Flames Rick Tabaracci | To Tampa Bay Lightning 4th-rd pick - 1998 entry draft (# 92 - Eric Beaudoin) | |
| June 21, 1997 | To Boston Bruins Mike Sullivan | To Calgary Flames 7th-rd pick - 1998 entry draft (# 192 - Radek Duda) | |
| June 27, 1997 | To St. Louis Blues Alexander Godynyuk; 6th-rd pick - 1998 entry draft (# 157 - Brad Voth) | To Carolina Hurricanes Stephen Leach | |

1. Philadelphia's acquired second-round pick went to Ottawa as the result of a trade on January 17, 1998 that sent Alexandre Daigle to Philadelphia in exchange for Pat Falloon, Vaclav Prospal and this pick.

== July ==
| Date | | | References |
|---|---|---|---|
| July 16, 1997 | To Edmonton Oilers Brantt Myhres; 3rd-rd pick - 1998 entry draft (# 67 - Alex Henry) | To Tampa Bay Lightning Vladimir Vujtek; 3rd-rd pick - 1998 entry draft (# 72 - Dimitri Afanasenkov) | |
| July 24, 1997 | To San Jose Sharks Stephane Matteau | To St. Louis Blues Darren Turcotte | |
| July 25, 1997 | To San Jose Sharks Murray Craven | To Chicago Blackhawks Petri Varis; 6th-rd pick - 1998 entry draft (# 158 - Jari Viuhkola) | |
| July 25, 1997 | To Chicago Blackhawks Ryan Risidore; 5th-rd pick - 1998 entry draft (TOR - # 126 - Morgan Warren)^{1} | To Carolina Hurricanes Enrico Ciccone | |

1. Chicago's acquired fifth-round pick went to Toronto as the result of a trade on June 27, 1998 that sent a first-round pick and a fourth-round pick in the 1998 entry draft to Chicago in exchange for a first-round pick and a third-round pick in the 1998 entry draft along with this pick.

== August ==
| Date | | | References |
|---|---|---|---|
| August 8, 1997 | To Carolina Hurricanes 4th-rd pick - 1998 entry draft (# 93 - Tommy Westlund) | To New York Rangers Jason Muzzatti | |
| August 12, 1997 | To Edmonton Oilers 3rd-rd pick - 1998 entry draft (NJD - # 82 - Brian Gionta)^{1} | To Pittsburgh Penguins Jiri Slegr | |
| August 18, 1997 | To San Jose Sharks Mike Vernon; 5th-rd pick - 1999 entry draft (DET - # 149 - Andrei Maximenko)^{2} | To Detroit Red Wings 2nd-rd pick - 1998 entry draft (STL - # 41 - Maxim Linnik)^{3} 2nd-rd pick - 1999 entry draft (TBL - # 47 - Sheldon Keefe)^{4} | |
| August 20, 1997 | To Tampa Bay Lightning Karl Dykhuis; Mikael Renberg | To Philadelphia Flyers 1st-rd pick - 1998 entry draft (# 22 - Simon Gagne); 1st-rd pick - 1999 entry draft (# 22 - Maxime Ouellet); 1st-rd pick - 2000 entry draft (# 28 - Justin Williams); 1st-rd pick - 2001 entry draft (OTT - # 23 - Tim Gleason)^{5} | |
| August 22, 1997 | To New Jersey Devils Vlastimil Kroupa | To San Jose Sharks 3rd-rd pick - 1998 entry draft (NAS - # 85 - Geoff Koch)^{6} | |
| August 25, 1997 | To St. Louis Blues Steve Duchesne | To Ottawa Senators Igor Kravchuk | |
| August 25, 1997 | To Edmonton Oilers Dan LaCouture | To New York Islanders Mariusz Czerkawski | |
| August 25, 1997 | To Calgary Flames Andrew Cassels; Jean-Sebastien Giguere | To Carolina Hurricanes Trevor Kidd; Gary Roberts | |
| August 28, 1997 | To Los Angeles Kings Luc Robitaille | To New York Rangers Kevin Stevens | |
| August 29, 1997 | To Boston Bruins Byron Dafoe; Dmitri Khristich | To Los Angeles Kings Sandy Moger; Jozef Stumpel; 4th-rd pick - 1998 entry draft (NJD - # 105- Pierre Dagenais)^{6} | |

1. Edmonton's acquired third-round pick went to New Jersey as the result of a trade on June 27, 1998 that sent the rights to Fredrik Bremberg, a fourth-round and fifth-round picks in the 1998 entry draft to Edmonton in exchange for this pick.
2. Detroit's fifth-round pick was re-acquired as the result of a trade on June 26, 1999 that sent a fifth-round pick in the 2000 entry draft to San Jose in exchange for this pick.
3. Detroit's acquired second-round pick went to St. Louis as the result of a trade on June 27, 1998 that sent second-round and fourth-round picks in the 1998 entry draft to Detroit in exchange for this pick.
4. Detroit's acquired second-round pick went to Tampa Bay as the result of a trade on March 23, 1999 that sent Wendel Clark and a sixth-round pick in the 1999 entry draft to Detroit in exchange for Kevin Hodson and this pick.
5. Philadelphia's first-round pick went to Ottawa as the result of a trade on June 23, 2001 that sent a first-round and a seventh-round compensatory pick in the 2001 entry draft along with a second-round pick the 2002 entry draft in exchange for this pick.
6. Los Angeles' acquired fourth-round pick went to New Jersey as the result of a trade on June 18, 1998 that sent Doug Bodger to Los Angeles in exchange for this pick.

== September ==
| Date | | | References |
|---|---|---|---|
| September 4, 1997 | To Calgary Flames Eric Charron | To Washington Capitals future considerations (7th-rd pick - 1998 entry draft # 179 - Nathan Forster)^{1} | |
| September 17, 1997 | To Mighty Ducks of Anaheim Scott Young | To Colorado Avalanche 3rd-rd pick - 1998 entry draft (FLA - # 63 - Lance Ward)^{2} | |
| September 24, 1997 | To Chicago Blackhawks Kirk Daubenspeck | To Ottawa Senators 6th-rd pick - 1998 entry draft (# 161 - Chris Neil) future considerations | |
| September 24, 1997 | To Buffalo Sabres Jason Woolley | To Pittsburgh Penguins 5th-rd pick - 1998 entry draft (# 134 - Rob Scuderi) | |
| September 28, 1997 | To Colorado Avalanche Francois Leroux | To Pittsburgh Penguins 3rd-rd pick - 1998 entry draft (# 80 - David Cameron) | |
| September 29, 1997 | To Buffalo Sabres 2nd-rd pick - 1998 entry draft (# 34 - Andrew Peters) conditional 5th-rd pick - 2000 entry draft^{3} | To New York Rangers Pat LaFontaine | |
| September 30, 1997 | To Toronto Maple Leafs future considerations | To St. Louis Blues Kelly Chase | |

1. Trade completed on June 27, 1998
2. Colorado's acquired third-round pick went to Florida as the result of a trade on March 23, 1998 that sent Tom Fitzgerald to Colorado in exchange for the rights to Mark Parrish and this pick.
3. Conditions of this draft pick are unknown. Buffalo made no pick selection belonging to the Rangers in the 2000 entry draft.

== October ==
| Date | | | References |
|---|---|---|---|
| October 10, 1997 | To Chicago Blackhawks Martin Gendron; 6th-rd pick - 1998 entry draft (# 166 - Jonathan Pelletier) | To Washington Capitals 5th-rd pick - 1998 entry draft (# 125 - Erik Wendell) | |
| October 15, 1997 | To Edmonton Oilers Jason Bowen | To Philadelphia Flyers Brantt Myhres | |
| October 21, 1997 | To Philadelphia Flyers Mike Maneluk | To Ottawa Senators cash | |
| October 27, 1997 | To Chicago Blackhawks Greg Johnson | To Pittsburgh Penguins Tuomas Gronman | |

== November ==
| Date | | | References |
|---|---|---|---|
| November 12, 1997 | To Buffalo Sabres future considerations | To Chicago Blackhawks Andrei Trefilov | |
| November 13, 1997 | To San Jose Sharks Dave Lowry; 1st-rd pick - 1998 entry draft (TBL - # 1 - Vincent Lecavalier)^{1} | To Florida Panthers Viktor Kozlov conditional 5th-rd pick - 1998 entry draft (# 117 - Jaroslav Spacek)^{2} | |
| November 14, 1997 | To Los Angeles Kings conditional pick - 1999 entry draft^{3} | To New York Rangers Brad Smyth | |
| November 17, 1997 | To Carolina Hurricanes Sean Hill | To Ottawa Senators Chris Murray | |
| November 20, 1997 | To San Jose Sharks Mike Ricci; 2nd-rd pick - 1998 entry draft (BUF - # 50 - Jaroslav Kristek)^{4} | To Colorado Avalanche Shean Donovan; 1st-rd pick - 1998 entry draft (# 12 - Alex Tanguay) | |

1. San Jose's acquired first-round pick went to Tampa Bay as the result of a trade on March 24, 1998 that sent Bryan Marchment and David Shaw to San Jose in exchange for Andrei Nazarov and Tampa Bay's conditional right to swap first-round pick in the 1998 entry draft (this pick).
2. Conditions of this draft pick are unknown.
3. Conditions of this draft pick are unknown and no pick was taken.
4. San Jose's acquired second-round pick went to Buffalo as the result of a trade on June 18, 1998 that sent Steve Shields and a fourth-round pick in the 1998 Entry Draft to San Jose in exchange for Kay Whitmore, a fifth-round pick in the 2000 entry draft and this pick.

== December ==
| Date | | | References |
|---|---|---|---|
| December 7, 1997 | To New Jersey Devils Doug Bodger; Dody Wood | To San Jose Sharks John MacLean; Ken Sutton | |
| December 30, 1997 | To Edmonton Oilers Roman Hamrlik rights to Paul Comrie | To Tampa Bay Lightning Jason Bonsignore; Steve Kelly; Bryan Marchment | |

== January ==
| Date | | | References |
|---|---|---|---|
| January 2, 1998 | To Toronto Maple Leafs Jeff Brown | To Carolina Hurricanes conditional pick - 1999 entry draft (NAS - 4th-rd - # 121 - Evgeny Pavlov)^{1} | |
| January 2, 1998 | To Vancouver Canucks Sean Burke; Enrico Ciccone; Geoff Sanderson | To Carolina Hurricanes Martin Gelinas; Kirk McLean | |
| January 4, 1998 | To New Jersey Devils Jason Arnott; Bryan Muir | To Edmonton Oilers Bill Guerin; Valeri Zelepukin | |
| January 8, 1998 | To New Jersey Devils 4th-rd pick - 1998 entry draft (# 96 - Mikko Jokela) future considerations | To Chicago Blackhawks Reid Simpson | |
| January 9, 1998 | To Mighty Ducks of Anaheim Drew Bannister | To Edmonton Oilers Bobby Dollas | |
| January 15, 1998 | To Tampa Bay Lightning Mark Fitzpatrick; Jody Hull | To Florida Panthers Dino Ciccarelli; Jeff Norton | |
| January 15, 1998 | To Montreal Canadiens Patrick Poulin; Igor Ulanov; Mick Vukota | To Tampa Bay Lightning Stephane Richer; Darcy Tucker; David Wilkie | |
| January 17, 1998 | To Philadelphia Flyers Alexandre Daigle | To Ottawa Senators Pat Falloon; Vaclav Prospal; 2nd-rd pick - 1998 entry draft (# 58 - Chris Bala) | |

1. Carolina's acquired fourth-round pick went to Nashville as the result of a trade on June 26, 1999 that sent Eric Fichaud to Carolina in exchange for future considerations and this pick. Conditions of this draft pick in the original trade are unknown.

== February ==
| Date | | | References |
|---|---|---|---|
| February 1, 1998 | To Montreal Canadiens Jonas Hoglund; Zarley Zalapski | To Calgary Flames Valeri Bure; 4th-rd pick - 1998 entry draft (# 102 - Shaun Sutter) | |
| February 4, 1998 | To Buffalo Sabres Geoff Sanderson | To Vancouver Canucks Brad May; 4th-rd pick - 1999 entry draft (TBL - # 88 - Jimmie Olvestad)^{1} | |
| February 5, 1998 | To Mighty Ducks of Anaheim Travis Green; Doug Houda; Tony Tuzzolino | To New York Islanders Jean-Jacques Daigneault; Mark Janssens; Joe Sacco | |
| February 5, 1998 | To Vancouver Canucks 5th-rd pick - 1998 entry draft (PHI - # 139 - Garrett Prosofsky)^{2} | To Philadelphia Flyers Mike Sillinger | |
| February 5, 1998 | To New Jersey Devils 5th-rd pick - 1998 entry draft (# 119 - Anton But) | To Vancouver Canucks Peter Zezel | |
| February 6, 1998 | To Vancouver Canucks Todd Bertuzzi; Bryan McCabe; 3rd-rd pick - 1998 entry draft (# 68 - Jarkko Ruutu) | To New York Islanders Trevor Linden | |

1. Vancouver's acquired fourth-round pick went to Tampa Bay as the result of a trade on June 25, 1999 that sent a first-round pick in the 1999 entry draft to Vancouver in exchange for a first-round pick, a third-round pick in the 1998 entry draft and this pick.
2. Philadelphia fifth-round pick was re-acquired as the result of a trade on March 24, 1998 that sent a third-round pick in the 1998 Entry Draft to Vancouver in exchange for Dave Babych and this pick.

== March ==
- Trading Deadline: March 24, 1998

| Date | | | References |
|---|---|---|---|
| March 3, 1998 | To Boston Bruins Grant Ledyard | To Vancouver Canucks 8th-rd pick – 1998 entry draft (# 219 – Curtis Valentine) | |
| March 4, 1998 | To Vancouver Canucks Garth Snow | To Philadelphia Flyers Sean Burke | |
| March 4, 1998 | To Phoenix Coyotes Keith Carney; Jim Cummins | To Chicago Blackhawks Chad Kilger; Jayson More | |
| March 7, 1998 | To Toronto Maple Leafs Lonny Bohonos | To Vancouver Canucks Brandon Convery | |
| March 8, 1998 | To Washington Capitals Esa Tikkanen | To Florida Panthers Dwayne Hay conditional pick – 1999 entry draft^{1} (4th-rd - # 103 – Morgan McCormick) | |
| March 9, 1998 | To Edmonton Oilers Frank Musil | To Ottawa Senators Scott Ferguson | |
| March 14, 1998 | To Vancouver Canucks Jamie Huscroft | To Tampa Bay Lightning Enrico Ciccone | |
| March 14, 1998 | To Montreal Canadiens Martin Gendron | To Chicago Blackhawks David Ling | |
| March 17, 1998 | To Toronto Maple Leafs 8th-rd pick – 1998 entry draft (# 215 – Dwight Wolfe) | To Ottawa Senators Per Gustafsson | |
| March 23, 1998 | To Colorado Avalanche Tom Fitzgerald | To Florida Panthers rights to Mark Parrish; 3rd-rd pick – 1998 entry draft (# 63 – Lance Ward) | |
| March 23, 1998 | To Florida Panthers Kirk McLean | To Carolina Hurricanes Ray Sheppard | |
| March 23, 1998 | To Vancouver Canucks Jason Strudwick | To New York Islanders Gino Odjick | |
| March 24, 1998 | To Toronto Maple Leafs 8th-rd pick – 1998 entry draft (# 228 – Michal Travnicek) | To Dallas Stars Mike Kennedy | |
| March 24, 1998 | To Dallas Stars Mike Keane; Brian Skrudland conditional 6th-rd pick^{2} – 1998 entry draft (# 153 – Pavel Patera) or 1999 entry draft | To New York Rangers Bob Errey; Todd Harvey; 4th-rd pick – 1998 entry draft (# 114 – Boyd Kane) | |
| March 24, 1998 | To San Jose Sharks Joe Murphy | To St. Louis Blues Todd Gill | |
| March 24, 1998 | To San Jose Sharks Bryan Marchment; David Shaw | To Tampa Bay Lightning Andrei Nazarov; Tampa Bay's conditional right to swap 1st-rd picks – 1998 entry draft (# 1 – Vincent Lecavalier)^{3} | |
| March 24, 1998 | To San Jose Sharks Jason Muzzatti | To New York Rangers Rich Brennan | |
| March 24, 1998 | To Buffalo Sabres Jason Holland; Paul Kruse | To New York Islanders Jason Dawe | |
| March 24, 1998 | To Toronto Maple Leafs 4th-rd pick – 1998 entry draft (# 87 – Alexei Ponikarovsky) | To Detroit Red Wings Jamie Macoun | |
| March 24, 1998 | To Mighty Ducks of Anaheim Jamie Pushor; 4th-rd pick – 1998 entry draft (# 112 – Viktor Wallin) | To Detroit Red Wings Dmitri Mironov | |
| March 24, 1998 | To Chicago Blackhawks Ryan VandenBussche | To New York Rangers Ryan Risidore | |
| March 24, 1998 | To St. Louis Blues Mike Eastwood | To New York Rangers Harry York | |
| March 24, 1998 | To Mighty Ducks of Anaheim rights to Patrick Lalime | To Pittsburgh Penguins Sean Pronger | |
| March 24, 1998 | To Edmonton Oilers Janne Niinimaa | To Philadelphia Flyers Dan McGillis; 2nd-rd pick – 1998 entry draft (# 42 – Jason Beckett) | |
| March 24, 1998 | To Mighty Ducks of Anaheim Josef Marha | To Colorado Avalanche Warren Rychel conditional pick – 1999 entry draft (4th-rd - # 112 – Sanny Lindstrom)^{4} | |
| March 24, 1998 | To Toronto Maple Leafs Sylvain Cote | To Washington Capitals Jeff Brown | |
| March 24, 1998 | To Calgary Flames Jason Wiemer | To Tampa Bay Lightning Sandy McCarthy; 3rd-rd pick – 1998 entry draft (# 64 – Brad Richards); 5th-rd pick – 1998 entry draft (# 121 – Curtis Rich) | |
| March 24, 1998 | To Phoenix Coyotes Mark Janssens | To New York Islanders 9th-rd pick – 1998 entry draft (# 242 – Jason Doyle) | |
| March 24, 1998 | To Vancouver Canucks 3rd-rd pick – 1998 entry draft (# 81 – Justin Morrison) | To Philadelphia Flyers Dave Babych; 5th-rd pick – 1998 entry draft (# 139 – Garrett Prosofsky) | |

1. Conditions of this draft pick are unknown.
2. Conditions of this draft pick are unknown.
3. Tampa Bay did swap its first-round pick with San Jose for the 1998 entry draft.
4. Conditions of this draft pick are unknown.

== See also ==
- 1997 NHL entry draft
- 1997 in sports
- 1998 in sports
