= 1997–98 Edmonton Oilers season =

NHL team season

1997–98 Edmonton Oilers
- Division: 3rd Pacific
- Conference: 7th Western
- 1997–98 record: 35–37–10
- Home record: 20–16–5
- Road record: 15–21–5
- Goals for: 215
- Goals against: 224

Team information
- General manager: Glen Sather
- Coach: Ron Low
- Captain: Kelly Buchberger
- Alternate captains: Boris Mironov; Doug Weight
- Arena: Edmonton Coliseum
- Average attendance: 16,245 (95.0%)
- Minor league affiliates: Hamilton Bulldogs (AHL); New Orleans Brass (ECHL)

Team leaders
- Goals: Doug Weight (26)
- Assists: Doug Weight (44)
- Points: Doug Weight (70)
- Penalty minutes: Drake Berehowsky (169)
- Plus/minus: Todd Marchant (+9); Dean McAmmond (+9)
- Wins: Curtis Joseph (29)
- Goals against average: Curtis Joseph (2.63)

The 1997–98 Edmonton Oilers season was the Oilers' 19th season in the NHL, and they were coming off a 36–37–9 record in 1996–97, earning their first Stanley Cup playoff spot in five seasons. The Oilers then defeated the heavily favoured Colorado Avalanche before losing to the Dallas Stars in the second round.

Edmonton began the season slowly, and on January 4, with a record of 11–22–9, the Oilers traded Jason Arnott and Bryan Muir to the New Jersey Devils in exchange for Bill Guerin and Valeri Zelepukin. The trade seemed to spark Edmonton, as they finished the year 24–15–1, making the playoffs for the second-straight season after finishing in seventh place in the Western Conference.

Offensively, Doug Weight had another solid season, leading the Oilers in goals (26), assists (44) and points (70). Ryan Smyth was the only other player to score at least 20 goals for the team. Dean McAmmond had a breakout season, finishing second to Weight with 50 points, as well as third in goals, with 19. Bill Guerin had a solid half season in Edmonton, scoring 13 goals and 29 points in 40 games. Boris Mironov would lead the defence with 16 goals and 46 points, while Drake Berehowsky would lead the team with 169 penalty minutes.

In goal, Curtis Joseph got the majority of playing time, winning 29 games, posting a goals against average (GAA) of 2.63 and setting the club record with shutouts in a season at eight. Bob Essensa backed him up once again, contributing a solid GAA of 2.55 and winning six games. The Oilers also tied the Dallas Stars for most power-play goals scored (77) and finished with the most power-play opportunities (483) in the League.

On March 2, 1998, Scott Fraser scored just 11 seconds into the overtime period to give the Oilers a 5-4 road win over the Colorado Avalanche. It would prove to be the fastest overtime goal scored during the 1997–98 regular season.

The Oilers opened the playoffs against the Pacific Division-winning Colorado Avalanche, who eliminated Edmonton from the playoffs the previous spring, and finished with 15 more points during the regular season. The Oilers, however, surprised the Avalanche in the opening game, winning 3–2, but Colorado stormed back to win three in a row to go up 3–1 in the series. The Oilers held off the Avalanche in Game 5 with a 3–1 in Denver, then returned home for game 6 to shut-out Colorado 2–0, forcing a deciding Game 7. Curtis Joseph earned his second-straight shutout in the series, as Edmonton won 4–0 and the series 4–3, eliminating the heavily favoured Avalanche.

In the second round, Edmonton played against Dallas, whom the Oilers defeated the previous year in the opening round. The Stars finished with an NHL-best 109 points in the regular season. The Stars beat Edmonton in the first game, but Curtis Joseph shut-out Dallas in Game 2, evening the series as it returned to Edmonton for the next two games. The third game was scoreless in regulation time, though the Stars scored in the first overtime period to take a 2–1 series lead. The Oilers' offence then went dry as they scored only two goals in the next two games, losing both, and the series 4–1.

== Season standings ==
Pacific Division
No.	CR		GP	W	L	T	GF	GA	Pts
1	2	**Colorado Avalanche**	82	39	26	17	231	205	95
2	5	**Los Angeles Kings**	82	38	33	11	227	225	87
3	7	**Edmonton Oilers**	82	35	37	10	215	224	80
4	8	**San Jose Sharks**	82	34	38	10	210	216	78
5	11	Calgary Flames	82	26	41	15	217	252	67
6	12	Mighty Ducks of Anaheim	82	26	43	13	205	261	65
7	13	Vancouver Canucks	82	25	43	14	224	273	64

Note: CR = Conference rank; GP = Games played; W = Wins; L = Losses; T = Ties; GF = Goals for; GA = Goals against; Pts = Points
Bolded teams qualified for the playoffs.

Western Conference
R		Div	GP	W	L	T	GF	GA	Pts
**1**	**p – Dallas Stars**	**CEN**	**82**	**49**	**22**	**11**	**242**	**167**	**109**
**2**	**x – Colorado Avalanche**	**PAC**	**82**	**39**	**26**	**17**	**231**	**205**	**95**
**3**	**Detroit Red Wings**	**CEN**	**82**	**44**	**23**	**15**	**250**	**196**	**103**
**4**	**St. Louis Blues**	**CEN**	**82**	**45**	**29**	**8**	**256**	**204**	**98**
**5**	**Los Angeles Kings**	**PAC**	**82**	**38**	**33**	**11**	**227**	**225**	**87**
**6**	**Phoenix Coyotes**	**CEN**	**82**	**35**	**35**	**12**	**224**	**227**	**82**
**7**	**Edmonton Oilers**	**PAC**	**82**	**35**	**37**	**10**	**215**	**224**	**80**
**8**	**San Jose Sharks**	**PAC**	**82**	**34**	**38**	**10**	**210**	**216**	**78**
9	Chicago Blackhawks	CEN	82	30	39	13	192	199	73
10	Toronto Maple Leafs	CEN	82	30	43	9	194	237	69
11	Calgary Flames	PAC	82	26	41	15	217	252	67
12	Mighty Ducks of Anaheim	PAC	82	26	43	13	205	261	65
13	Vancouver Canucks	PAC	82	25	43	14	224	273	64

Divisions: CEN – Central, PAC – Pacific

bold – Qualified for playoffs; x – Won Division; p – Won Presidents' Trophy

== Schedule and results ==
=== Regular season ===
1997–98 regular season
October: 5–6–1 (home: 3–4–1; road: 2–2–0)

Game	Date	Visitor	Score	Home	OT	Decision	Attendance	Record	Pts	Recap
1	October 1	Edmonton Oilers	5 – 3	San Jose Sharks		Joseph	16,769	1–0–0	2	W
2	October 3	Detroit Red Wings	8 – 2	Edmonton Oilers		Joseph	17,099	1–1–0	2	L
3	October 5	Colorado Avalanche	3 – 0	Edmonton Oilers		Joseph	16,093	1–2–0	2	L
4	October 8	New York Rangers	3 – 3	Edmonton Oilers	OT	Joseph	16,573	1–2–1	3	T
5	October 11	Toronto Maple Leafs	1 – 2	Edmonton Oilers		Joseph	17,099	2–2–1	5	W
6	October 13	Edmonton Oilers	0 – 3	Vancouver Canucks		Essensa	14,535	2–3–1	5	L
7	October 15	Colorado Avalanche	6 – 2	Edmonton Oilers		Joseph	15,972	2–4–1	5	L
8	October 17	Edmonton Oilers	1 – 2	Mighty Ducks of Anaheim		Essensa	16,565	2–5–1	5	L
9	October 19	Edmonton Oilers	3 – 2	Los Angeles Kings	OT	Joseph	11,279	3–5–1	7	W
10	October 21	Boston Bruins	2 – 1	Edmonton Oilers		Joseph	14,870	3–6–1	7	L
11	October 24	Pittsburgh Penguins	3 – 4	Edmonton Oilers		Joseph	17,099	4–6–1	9	W
12	October 29	Phoenix Coyotes	2 – 3	Edmonton Oilers		Joseph	14,390	5–6–1	11	W

November: 3–7–5 (home: 1–2–2; road: 2–5–3)

Game	Date	Visitor	Score	Home	OT	Decision	Attendance	Record	Pts	Recap
13	November 1	Edmonton Oilers	1 – 3	Boston Bruins		Joseph	13,969	5–7–1	11	L
14	November 3	Edmonton Oilers	2 – 2	New York Rangers	OT	Joseph	18,200	5–7–2	12	T
15	November 5	Edmonton Oilers	4 – 4	New York Islanders	OT	Joseph	9,036	5–7–3	13	T
16	November 6	Edmonton Oilers	2 – 6	Philadelphia Flyers		Essensa	19,348	5–8–3	13	L
17	November 8	Edmonton Oilers	1 – 2	Washington Capitals		Joseph	10,397	5–9–3	13	L
18	November 10	Edmonton Oilers	4 – 4	Buffalo Sabres	OT	Joseph	13,628	5–9–4	14	T
19	November 12	Carolina Hurricanes	6 – 4	Edmonton Oilers		Joseph	14,240	5–10–4	14	L
20	November 15	Calgary Flames	2 – 2	Edmonton Oilers	OT	Joseph	17,099	5–10–5	15	T
21	November 17	Edmonton Oilers	3 – 6	Phoenix Coyotes		Joseph	14,686	5–11–5	15	L
22	November 19	Edmonton Oilers	2 – 3	Dallas Stars		Joseph	15,783	5–12–5	15	L
23	November 20	Edmonton Oilers	3 – 0	St. Louis Blues		Joseph	15,988	6–12–5	17	W
24	November 22	Edmonton Oilers	1 – 0	Ottawa Senators		Joseph	17,113	7–12–5	19	W
25	November 25	Chicago Blackhawks	2 – 2	Edmonton Oilers	OT	Joseph	14,473	7–12–6	20	T
26	November 28	Mighty Ducks of Anaheim	3 – 1	Edmonton Oilers		Joseph	17,099	7–13–6	20	L
27	November 30	San Jose Sharks	1 – 6	Edmonton Oilers		Joseph	14,739	8–13–6	22	W

December: 3–7–3 (home: 1–3–1; road: 2–4–2)

Game	Date	Visitor	Score	Home	OT	Decision	Attendance	Record	Pts	Recap
28	December 2	Edmonton Oilers	2 – 4	Colorado Avalanche		Joseph	16,061	8–14–6	22	L
29	December 3	Edmonton Oilers	1 – 4	Dallas Stars		Joseph	14,241	8–15–6	22	L
30	December 5	Detroit Red Wings	1 – 3	Edmonton Oilers		Essensa	17,099	9–15–6	24	W
31	December 7	Edmonton Oilers	3 – 3	Chicago Blackhawks	OT	Joseph	15,591	9–15–7	25	T
32	December 10	Edmonton Oilers	2 – 4	New Jersey Devils		Joseph	13,831	9–16–7	25	L
33	December 12	Edmonton Oilers	3 – 2	Detroit Red Wings		Essensa	19,983	10–16–7	27	W
34	December 13	Edmonton Oilers	4 – 1	St. Louis Blues		Joseph	17,207	11–16–7	29	W
35	December 17	Chicago Blackhawks	0 – 0	Edmonton Oilers	OT	Joseph	15,431	11–16–8	30	T
36	December 20	Dallas Stars	2 – 1	Edmonton Oilers	OT	Joseph	17,099	11–17–8	30	L
37	December 22	Edmonton Oilers	3 – 3	Montreal Canadiens	OT	Essensa	20,731	11–17–9	31	T
38	December 23	Edmonton Oilers	4 – 5	Toronto Maple Leafs		Joseph	15,726	11–18–9	31	L
39	December 27	Colorado Avalanche	5 – 1	Edmonton Oilers		Joseph	17,099	11–19–9	31	L
40	December 30	Philadelphia Flyers	3 – 1	Edmonton Oilers		Joseph	17,099	11–20–9	31	L

January: 8–5–0 (home: 5–3–0; road: 3–2–0)

Game	Date	Visitor	Score	Home	OT	Decision	Attendance	Record	Pts	Recap
41	January 2	Montreal Canadiens	5 – 3	Edmonton Oilers		Joseph	17,099	11–21–9	31	L
42	January 4	Los Angeles Kings	3 – 2	Edmonton Oilers		Joseph	16,266	11–22–9	31	L
43	January 7	Florida Panthers	2 – 3	Edmonton Oilers		Joseph	14,797	12–22–9	33	W
44	January 9	Edmonton Oilers	5 – 1	Mighty Ducks of Anaheim		Joseph	17,174	13–22–9	35	W
45	January 10	Edmonton Oilers	4 – 3	Los Angeles Kings		Joseph	16,005	14–22–9	37	W
46	January 12	St. Louis Blues	1 – 2	Edmonton Oilers		Joseph	14,872	15–22–9	39	W
47	January 14	Calgary Flames	2 – 5	Edmonton Oilers		Joseph	17,099	16–22–9	41	W
48	January 20	Phoenix Coyotes	2 – 6	Edmonton Oilers		Joseph	14,842	17–22–9	43	W
49	January 23	Edmonton Oilers	2 – 3	San Jose Sharks		Joseph	17,483	17–23–9	43	L
50	January 24	Edmonton Oilers	5 – 2	Phoenix Coyotes		Essensa	15,826	18–23–9	45	W
51	January 26	Edmonton Oilers	1 – 2	Colorado Avalanche	OT	Joseph	16,061	18–24–9	45	L
52	January 28	New Jersey Devils	1 – 1	Edmonton Oilers	OT	Joseph	17,099	18–24–10	46	T
53	January 31	Vancouver Canucks	6 – 3	Edmonton Oilers		Joseph	17,099	18–25–10	46	L

February: 3–4–0 (home: 3–2–0; road: 0–2–0)

Game	Date	Visitor	Score	Home	OT	Decision	Attendance	Record	Pts	Recap
54	February 2	Los Angeles Kings	0 – 1	Edmonton Oilers		Joseph	14,403	19–25–10	48	W
55	February 4	San Jose Sharks	3 – 0	Edmonton Oilers		Joseph	15,251	19–26–10	48	L
56	February 6	Edmonton Oilers	4 – 5	Vancouver Canucks		Joseph	17,421	19–27–10	48	L
57	February 7	Edmonton Oilers	2 – 4	Calgary Flames		Essensa	18,719	19–28–10	48	L
58	February 25	Ottawa Senators	2 – 5	Edmonton Oilers		Essensa	16,142	20–28–10	50	W
59	February 27	Mighty Ducks of Anaheim	4 – 0	Edmonton Oilers		Essensa	17,099	20–29–10	50	L
60	February 28	San Jose Sharks	1 – 4	Edmonton Oilers		Joseph	17,099	21–29–10	52	W

March: 8–6–0 (home: 4–2–0; road: 4–4–0)

Game	Date	Visitor	Score	Home	OT	Decision	Attendance	Record	Pts	Recap
61	March 2	Edmonton Oilers	5 – 4	Colorado Avalanche	OT	Essensa	16,061	22–29–10	54	W
62	March 4	Tampa Bay Lightning	2 – 4	Edmonton Oilers		Joseph	14,640	23–29–10	56	W
63	March 7	Edmonton Oilers	1 – 4	Toronto Maple Leafs		Joseph	15,726	23–30–10	56	L
64	March 9	Edmonton Oilers	4 – 3	Chicago Blackhawks	OT	Joseph	17,900	24–30–10	58	W
65	March 11	Edmonton Oilers	2 – 0	Tampa Bay Lightning		Joseph	15,319	25–30–10	60	W
66	March 13	Edmonton Oilers	4 – 0	Florida Panthers		Joseph	14,703	26–30–10	62	W
67	March 15	Edmonton Oilers	1 – 4	Carolina Hurricanes		Joseph	7,853	26–31–10	62	L
68	March 17	Edmonton Oilers	3 – 4	Detroit Red Wings		Essensa	19,983	26–32–10	62	L
69	March 18	Edmonton Oilers	2 – 4	Pittsburgh Penguins		Joseph	14,327	26–33–10	62	L
70	March 21	St. Louis Blues	0 – 2	Edmonton Oilers		Joseph	17,099	27–33–10	64	W
71	March 22	New York Islanders	3 – 1	Edmonton Oilers		Joseph	16,731	27–34–10	64	L
72	March 25	Washington Capitals	2 – 4	Edmonton Oilers		Joseph	15,130	28–34–10	66	W
73	March 27	Buffalo Sabres	1 – 0	Edmonton Oilers		Joseph	17,099	28–35–10	66	L
74	March 30	Calgary Flames	1 – 3	Edmonton Oilers		Joseph	17,099	29–35–10	68	W

April: 6–2–0 (home: 4–0–0; road: 2–2–0)

Game	Date	Visitor	Score	Home	OT	Decision	Attendance	Record	Pts	Recap
75	April 1	Edmonton Oilers	2 – 4	Vancouver Canucks		Joseph	15,662	29–36–10	68	L
76	April 3	Dallas Stars	1 – 4	Edmonton Oilers		Joseph	17,099	30–36–10	70	W
77	April 6	Vancouver Canucks	2 – 3	Edmonton Oilers		Joseph	17,099	31–36–10	72	W
78	April 8	Edmonton Oilers	2 – 4	Mighty Ducks of Anaheim		Joseph	17,174	31–37–10	72	L
79	April 9	Edmonton Oilers	4 – 0	Los Angeles Kings		Joseph	14,450	32–37–10	74	W
80	April 11	Edmonton Oilers	5 – 4	Calgary Flames		Joseph	18,719	33–37–10	76	W
81	April 15	Mighty Ducks of Anaheim	3 – 5	Edmonton Oilers		Joseph	17,099	34–37–10	78	W
82	April 18	Toronto Maple Leafs	3 – 4	Edmonton Oilers		Essensa	17,099	35–37–10	80	W

Legend: W Win (2 points) L Loss (0 points) T Tie (1 point)

=== Playoffs ===
1998 Stanley Cup playoffs
Western Conference Quarterfinals vs. (2) Colorado Avalanche – Oilers win 4–3

Game	Date	Visitor	Score	Home	OT	Decision	Attendance	Series	Recap
1	April 22	Edmonton Oilers	3 – 2	Colorado Avalanche		Joseph	16,061	1–0	W
2	April 24	Edmonton Oilers	2 – 5	Colorado Avalanche		Joseph	16,061	1–1	L
3	April 26	Colorado Avalanche	5 – 4	Edmonton Oilers	OT	Joseph	17,099	1–2	L
4	April 28	Colorado Avalanche	3 – 1	Edmonton Oilers		Joseph	17,099	1–3	L
5	April 30	Edmonton Oilers	3 – 1	Colorado Avalanche		Joseph	16,061	2–3	W
6	May 2	Colorado Avalanche	0 – 2	Edmonton Oilers		Joseph	17,099	3–3	W
7	May 4	Edmonton Oilers	4 – 0	Colorado Avalanche		Joseph	16,061	4–3	W

Western Conference Semifinals vs. (1) Dallas Stars – Stars win 4–1

Game	Date	Visitor	Score	Home	OT	Decision	Attendance	Series	Recap
1	May 7	Edmonton Oilers	1 – 3	Dallas Stars		Joseph	16,928	0–1	L
2	May 9	Edmonton Oilers	2 – 0	Dallas Stars		Joseph	16,928	1–1	W
3	May 11	Dallas Stars	1 – 0	Edmonton Oilers	OT	Joseph	17,099	1–2	L
4	May 13	Dallas Stars	3 – 1	Edmonton Oilers		Joseph	17,099	1–3	L
5	May 16	Edmonton Oilers	1 – 2	Dallas Stars		Joseph	16,928	1–4	L

Legend: W Win L Loss

== Player statistics ==
=== Scoring ===
- Position abbreviations: C = Centre; D = Defence; G = Goaltender; LW = Left wing; RW = Right wing
- † = Joined team via a transaction (e.g., trade, waivers, signing) during the season. Stats reflect time with the Oilers only.
- ‡ = Left team via a transaction (e.g., trade, waivers, release) during the season. Stats reflect time with the Oilers only.

No.	Player	Pos	Regular season						Playoffs					
No.	Player	Pos	GP	G	A	Pts	+/-	PIM	GP	G	A	Pts	+/-	PIM
39	Doug Weight	C	79	26	44	70	1	69	12	2	7	9	−4	14
37	Dean McAmmond	LW	77	19	31	50	9	46	12	1	4	5	0	12
2	Boris Mironov	D	81	16	30	46	−8	100	12	3	3	6	−3	27
26	Todd Marchant	LW	76	14	21	35	9	71	12	1	1	2	0	10
94	Ryan Smyth	LW	65	20	13	33	−24	44	12	1	3	4	−2	16
9	Bill Guerin†	RW	40	13	16	29	1	80	12	7	1	8	−6	17
14	Mats Lindgren	C	82	13	13	26	0	42	12	1	1	2	0	10
22	Roman Hamrlik†	D	41	6	20	26	3	48	12	0	6	6	−4	12
33	Dan McGillis‡	D	67	10	15	25	−17	74	—	—	—	—	—	—
18	Scott Fraser	RW	29	12	11	23	6	6	11	1	1	2	0	0
16	Kelly Buchberger	RW	82	6	17	23	−10	122	12	1	2	3	0	25
51	Andrei Kovalenko	RW	59	6	17	23	−14	28	1	0	0	0	0	2
20	Tony Hrkac†	C	36	8	11	19	3	10	12	0	3	3	2	2
17	Rem Murray	C	61	9	9	18	−9	39	11	1	4	5	−1	2
7	Jason Arnott‡	RW	35	5	13	18	−16	78	—	—	—	—	—	—
25	Mike Grier	RW	66	9	6	15	−3	73	12	2	2	4	4	13
21	Valeri Zelepukin†	LW	33	2	10	12	−2	57	8	1	2	3	3	2
5	Greg de Vries	D	65	7	4	11	−17	80	7	0	0	0	−4	21
24	Janne Niinimaa†	D	11	1	8	9	7	6	11	1	1	2	3	12
6	Bobby Dollas†	D	30	2	5	7	6	22	11	0	0	0	2	16
15	Drake Berehowsky	D	67	1	6	7	1	169	12	1	2	3	1	14
19	Boyd Devereaux	C	38	1	4	5	−5	6	—	—	—	—	—	—
32	Craig Millar	D	11	4	0	4	−3	8	—	—	—	—	—	—
12	Joe Hulbig	LW	17	2	2	4	−1	2	—	—	—	—	—	—
8	Ray Whitney‡	LW	9	1	3	4	−1	0	—	—	—	—	—	—
24	Bryan Marchment‡	D	27	0	4	4	−2	58	—	—	—	—	—	—
8	Frank Musil†	D	17	1	2	3	1	8	7	0	0	0	1	6
9	Mike Watt	C	14	1	2	3	−4	4	—	—	—	—	—	—
55	Drew Bannister‡	D	34	0	2	2	−7	42	—	—	—	—	—	—
31	Curtis Joseph	G	71	0	2	2		4	12	0	0	0		2
10	Steve Kelly‡	C	19	0	2	2	−4	8	—	—	—	—	—	—
23	Sean Brown	D	18	0	1	1	−1	43	—	—	—	—	—	—
28	Bill Huard	LW	30	0	1	1	−5	72	4	0	0	0	0	2
21	Ladislav Benysek	D	2	0	0	0	−2	0	—	—	—	—	—	—
36	Dennis Bonvie	RW	4	0	0	0	0	27	—	—	—	—	—	—
29	Jason Bowen†	D	4	0	0	0	0	10	—	—	—	—	—	—
30	Bob Essensa	G	16	0	0	0		0	1	0	0	0		0
40	Scott Ferguson‡	D	1	0	0	0	1	0	—	—	—	—	—	—
8	Doug Friedman	LW	16	0	0	0	0	20	—	—	—	—	—	—
27	Georges Laraque	RW	11	0	0	0	−4	59	—	—	—	—	—	—
4	Kevin Lowe	D	7	0	0	0	−3	22	1	0	0	0	0	4
6	Bryan Muir‡	D	7	0	0	0	0	17	—	—	—	—	—	—
38	Terran Sandwith	D	8	0	0	0	−4	6	—	—	—	—	—	—

=== Goaltending ===
No.	Player	Regular season										Playoffs								
No.	Player	GP	W	L	T	SA	GA	GAA	SV%	SO	TOI	GP	W	L	SA	GA	GAA	SV%	SO	TOI
31	Curtis Joseph	71	29	31	9	1901	181	2.63	.905	8	4132	12	5	7	319	23	1.93	.928	3	716
30	Bob Essensa	16	6	6	1	404	35	2.54	.913	0	825	1	0	0	11	1	2.26	.909	0	27

== Awards and records ==
=== Awards ===
Type	Award/honour	Recipient	Ref
League (in-season)	NHL All-Star Game selection	Doug Weight	
League (in-season)	NHL Rookie of the Month	Scott Fraser (March)	
League (in-season)	NHL Rookie of the Month	Scott Fraser (April)	
Team	Community Service Award	Todd Marchant	
Team	Defenceman of the Year	Boris Mironov	
Team	Molson Cup	Curtis Joseph	
Team	Most Popular Player	Curtis Joseph	
Team	Top Defensive Forward	Mats Lindgren	
Team	Top First Year Oiler	Roman Hamrlik	
Team	Unsung Hero	Dean McAmmond	
Team	Zane Feldman Trophy	Doug Weight	

=== Records ===
- 14: An Oilers record for most shutouts in a career by Curtis Joseph.

- 10: A new Oilers record for most shutouts in a career by Curtis Joseph on February 2, 1998.

=== Milestones ===
Regular Season
Player	Milestone	Reached
Todd Marchant	100th NHL Point	October 1, 1997
Boyd Devereaux	1st NHL Game	October 5, 1997
Bryan Marchment	1,300th NHL PIM	October 11, 1997
Jason Bowen	100th NHL PIM	October 21, 1997
Steve Kelly	1st NHL Assist	October 24, 1997
Drake Berehowsky	200th NHL PIM	October 29, 1997
Boyd Devereaux	1st NHL Assist; 1st NHL Point	November 3, 1997
Craig Millar	1st NHL Goal; 1st NHL Point	November 5, 1997
Curtis Joseph	400th NHL Game	November 8, 1997
Ladislav Benysek	1st NHL Game	November 15, 1997
Georges Laraque	1st NHL Game	November 15, 1997
Mike Watt	1st NHL Game; 1st NHL Assist; 1st NHL Point	November 15, 1997
Sean Brown	1st NHL Assist; 1st NHL Point	November 17, 1997
Joe Hulbig	1st NHL Assist; 1st NHL Point	
Mike Grier	100th NHL Game	November 19, 1997
Bill Huard	200th NHL Game	November 19, 1997
Mike Watt	1st NHL Goal; 1st NHL Point	November 22, 1997
Doug Friedman	1st NHL Game	November 25, 1997
Doug Weight	400th NHL Point	November 28, 1997
Jason Arnott	100th NHL Goal	November 30, 1997
Greg de Vries	100th NHL PIM	December 2, 1997
Dean McAmmond	100th NHL Point	December 3, 1997
Joe Hulbig	1st NHL Goal	December 5, 1997
Dan McGillis	100th NHL Game	December 5, 1997
Rem Murray	100th NHL Game	December 5, 1997
Mats Lindgren	100th NHL Game	December 7, 1997
Doug Weight	300th NHL Assist	December 10, 1997
Kelly Buchberger	1,600th NHL PIM	December 20, 1997
Bryan Marchment	100th NHL Point	December 20, 1997
Kelly Buchberger	700th NHL Game	December 27, 1997
Dean McAmmond	200th NHL Game	December 27, 1997
Doug Weight	400th NHL PIM	December 27, 1997
Boyd Devereaux	1st NHL Goal	January 20, 1998
Dan McGillis	100th NHL PIM	January 23, 1998
Greg de Vries	100th NHL Game	January 31, 1998
Curtis Joseph	200th NHL Win	February 2, 1998
Terran Sandwith	1st NHL Game	February 2, 1998
Boris Mironov	100th NHL Assist	February 6, 1998
Roman Hamrlik	200th NHL Point	February 25, 1998
Boris Mironov	400th NHL PIM; 300th NHL Game	February 27, 1998
Bill Guerin	500th NHL PIM	February 28, 1998
Scott Ferguson	1st NHL Game	March 4, 1998
Bill Guerin	400th NHL Game	March 4, 1998
Drake Berehowsky	300th NHL PIM	March 7, 1998
Mike Grier	100th NHL PIM	March 7, 1998
Roman Hamrlik	400th NHL Game	March 7, 1998
Valeri Zelepukin	400th NHL PIM	March 7, 1998
Scott Fraser	1st NHL Assist	March 9, 1998
Roman Hamrlik	500th NHL PIM	March 13, 1998
Dean McAmmond	100th NHL PIM	March 15, 1998
Valeri Zelepukin	400th NHL Game	March 15, 1998
Frank Musil	100th NHL Assist	March 18, 1998
Todd Marchant	200th NHL PIM	March 25, 1998
Ryan Smyth	100th NHL Point	April 1, 1998
Bobby Dollas	500th NHL Game	April 3, 1998
Doug Weight	500th NHL Game	April 8, 1998
Frank Musil	1,200th NHL PIM	April 11, 1998

Playoffs
Player	Milestone	Reached
Drake Berehowsky	1st NHL Assist; 1st NHL Point	April 22, 1998
Dean McAmmond	1st NHL Goal; 1st NHL Point	April 22, 1998
Scott Fraser	1st NHL Game	April 22, 1998
Kelly Buchberger	100th NHL PIM	April 24, 1998
Curtis Joseph	50th NHL Game	April 28, 1998
Drake Berehowsky	1st NHL Goal	May 2, 1998
Bill Guerin	100th NHL PIM	May 2, 1998
Curtis Joseph	5th NHL Shutout	May 2, 1998
Dean McAmmond	1st NHL Assist	May 2, 1998
Mats Lindgren	1st NHL Goal	May 4, 1998
Scott Fraser	1st NHL Goal; 1st NHL Point	May 13, 1998
Scott Fraser	1st NHL Assist	May 16, 1998

== Transactions ==
=== Trades ===
June 18, 1997	To Philadelphia Flyers Matt Cerven	To Edmonton Oilers 7th round pick in 1997
July 16, 1997	To Tampa Bay Lightning Vladimir Vujtek; 3rd round pick in 1998	To Edmonton Oilers Brantt Myhres; 3rd round pick in 1998
August 12, 1997	To Pittsburgh Penguins Jiri Slegr	To Edmonton Oilers 3rd round pick in 1998
August 25, 1997	To New York Islanders Mariusz Czerkawski	To Edmonton Oilers Dan LaCouture
October 15, 1997	To Philadelphia Flyers Brantt Myhres	To Edmonton Oilers Jason Bowen
December 30, 1997	To Tampa Bay Lightning Bryan Marchment; Steve Kelly; Jason Bonsignore	To Edmonton Oilers Roman Hamrlik; Paul Comrie
January 4, 1998	To New Jersey Devils Jason Arnott; Bryan Muir	To Edmonton Oilers Bill Guerin; Valeri Zelepukin
January 9, 1998	To Mighty Ducks of Anaheim Drew Bannister	To Edmonton Oilers Bobby Dollas
March 9, 1998	To Ottawa Senators Scott Ferguson	To Edmonton Oilers Frank Musil
March 24, 1998	To Philadelphia Flyers Dan McGillis; 2nd round pick in 1998	To Edmonton Oilers Janne Niinimaa

=== Free agents ===
Player	Former team
F Doug Friedman	Colorado Avalanche
F Bill Huard	Dallas Stars
F Scott Fraser	Calgary Flames
G Jean-Francois Labbe	Colorado Avalanche
D Drake Berehowsky	Pittsburgh Penguins
F Ray Whitney	San Jose Sharks
G Tim Thomas	HIFK Helsinki (SM-liiga)

Player	New team
D Luke Richardson	Philadelphia Flyers
D Donald Dufresne	Quebec Rafales (IHL)
F Ralph Intranuovo	Manitoba Moose (IHL)
F Louie DeBrusk	Tampa Bay Lightning

== Draft picks ==
Edmonton's draft picks at the 1997 NHL entry draft.

Round	#	Player	Nationality	College/Junior/Club team (League)
1	14	Michel Riesen	Switzerland	EHC Biel (Switzerland)
2	41	Patrick Dovigi	Canada	Erie Otters (OHL)
3	68	Sergei Yerkovich	Belarus	Las Vegas Thunder (IHL)
4	94	Jonas Elofsson	Sweden	Farjestad BK (Sweden)
5	121	Jason Chimera	Canada	Medicine Hat Tigers (WHL)
6	141	Peter Sarno	Canada	Windsor Spitfires (OHL)
7	176	Kevin Bolibruck	Canada	Peterborough Petes (OHL)
7	187	Chad Hinz	Canada	Moose Jaw Warriors (WHL)
8	205	Chris Kerr	Canada	Windsor Spitfires (OHL)
9	231	Alexander Fomichev	Russia	St. Albert Saints (AJHL)
