= 1997–98 Detroit Red Wings season =

Sports season

1997–98 Detroit Red Wings
- Stanley Cup champions
- Western Conference champions
- Division: 2nd Central
- Conference: 3rd Western
- 1997–98 record: 44–23–15
- Home record: 25–8–8
- Road record: 19–15–7
- Goals for: 250
- Goals against: 196

Team information
- General manager: Ken Holland
- Coach: Scotty Bowman
- Captain: Steve Yzerman
- Alternate captains: Nicklas Lidstrom; Brendan Shanahan
- Arena: Joe Louis Arena
- Average attendance: 19,983 (100%); Total: 819,303
- Minor league affiliates: Adirondack Red Wings (AHL); Toledo Storm (ECHL)

Team leaders
- Goals: Brendan Shanahan (28)
- Assists: Steve Yzerman (45)
- Points: Steve Yzerman (69)
- Penalty minutes: Darren McCarty (157)
- Plus/minus: Larry Murphy (35)
- Wins: Chris Osgood (33)
- Goals against average: Chris Osgood (2.21)

The 1997–98 Detroit Red Wings season was the 72nd National Hockey League season in Detroit, Michigan. The highlight of the Red Wings' season was winning the Stanley Cup for a second season in a row.

== Regular season ==
=== Sergei Fedorov's holdout ===
After a lengthy holdout to start the 1997–98 season, Sergei Fedorov, a restricted free-agent, signed an offer sheet with the Carolina Hurricanes worth up to $38 million (with bonuses). The Red Wings matched the offer on February 26, 1998, ending Fedorov's holdout. The offer broke down as: $14 million for signing, $2 million for 21 regular season games and $12 million for the team reaching conference finals. $28 million for 43 total games in 1997–98 is the largest single season amount paid to an NHL athlete. Fedorov helped the Red Wings win their second consecutive Stanley Cup that year.

=== Season standings ===
Central Division
No.	CR		GP	W	L	T	GF	GA	Pts
1	1	**Dallas Stars**	82	49	22	11	242	167	109
2	3	**Detroit Red Wings**	82	44	23	15	250	196	103
3	4	**St. Louis Blues**	82	45	29	8	256	204	98
4	6	**Phoenix Coyotes**	82	35	35	12	224	227	82
5	9	Chicago Blackhawks	82	30	39	13	192	199	73
6	10	Toronto Maple Leafs	82	30	43	9	194	237	69

Western Conference
R		Div	GP	W	L	T	GF	GA	Pts
**1**	**p – Dallas Stars**	**CEN**	**82**	**49**	**22**	**11**	**242**	**167**	**109**
**2**	**x – Colorado Avalanche**	**PAC**	**82**	**39**	**26**	**17**	**231**	**205**	**95**
**3**	**Detroit Red Wings**	**CEN**	**82**	**44**	**23**	**15**	**250**	**196**	**103**
**4**	**St. Louis Blues**	**CEN**	**82**	**45**	**29**	**8**	**256**	**204**	**98**
**5**	**Los Angeles Kings**	**PAC**	**82**	**38**	**33**	**11**	**227**	**225**	**87**
**6**	**Phoenix Coyotes**	**CEN**	**82**	**35**	**35**	**12**	**224**	**227**	**82**
**7**	**Edmonton Oilers**	**PAC**	**82**	**35**	**37**	**10**	**215**	**224**	**80**
**8**	**San Jose Sharks**	**PAC**	**82**	**34**	**38**	**10**	**210**	**216**	**78**
9	Chicago Blackhawks	CEN	82	30	39	13	192	199	73
10	Toronto Maple Leafs	CEN	82	30	43	9	194	237	69
11	Calgary Flames	PAC	82	26	41	15	217	252	67
12	Mighty Ducks of Anaheim	PAC	82	26	43	13	205	261	65
13	Vancouver Canucks	PAC	82	25	43	14	224	273	64

Divisions: CEN – Central, PAC – Pacific

bold – Qualified for playoffs; x – Won Division; p – Won Presidents' Trophy

== Playoffs ==
=== Stanley Cup Finals ===
The 1998 Stanley Cup Finals were played in the 105th year of the Stanley Cup. The series was played between the Western Conference champion Detroit Red Wings and the Eastern Conference champion Washington Capitals. The Red Wings were led by captain Steve Yzerman, Head Coach Scotty Bowman and goaltender Chris Osgood. The Capitals were led by captain Dale Hunter, head coach Ron Wilson and goaltender Olaf Kolzig. The Red Wings swept the Capitals to capture their second consecutive Stanley Cup. During the presentation of the Stanley Cup, Vladimir Konstantinov was wheeled onto the ice in his wheelchair and captain Steve Yzerman gave him the cup while his teammates surrounded him.

== Schedule and results ==
=== Regular season ===
1997–98 regular season
October: 10–2–2 (home: 4–2–2; road: 6–0–0)

Game	Date	Visitor	Score	Home	OT	Decision	Record	Points	Recap
1	October 1	Detroit	3–1	Calgary		Osgood	1–0–0	2	W
2	October 3	Detroit	8–2	Edmonton		Osgood	2–0–0	4	W
3	October 8	Dallas	1–3	Detroit		Osgood	3–0–0	6	W
4	October 10	Tampa Bay	0–3	Detroit		Osgood	4–0–0	8	W
5	October 12	Calgary	4–4	Detroit	OT	Osgood	4–0–1	9	T
6	October 14	Detroit	3–2	Toronto		Osgood	5–0–1	11	W
7	October 15	Toronto	4–3	Detroit		Osgood	5–1–1	11	L
8	October 18	Carolina	2–4	Detroit		Osgood	6–1–1	13	W
9	October 20	St. Louis	3–3	Detroit	OT	Osgood	6–1–2	14	T
10	October 22	Detroit	4–1	Anaheim		Osgood	7–1–2	16	W
11	October 23	Detroit	4–1	Los Angeles		Hodson	8–1–2	18	W
12	October 26	Detroit	5–1	Vancouver		Osgood	9–1–2	20	W
13	October 29	San Jose	3–4	Detroit		Osgood	10–1–2	22	W
14	October 31	Los Angeles	5–1	Detroit		Hodson	10–2–2	22	L

November: 7–4–2 (home: 5–2–1; road: 2–2–1)

Game	Date	Visitor	Score	Home	OT	Decision	Record	Points	Recap
15	November 2	Anaheim	3–4	Detroit		Osgood	11–2–2	24	W
16	November 5	Detroit	1–3	Carolina		Osgood	11–3–2	24	L
17	November 7	Pittsburgh	1–1	Detroit	OT	Osgood	11–3–3	25	T
18	November 9	Calgary	3–6	Detroit		Osgood	12–3–3	27	W
19	November 11	Colorado	2–0	Detroit		Osgood	12–4–3	27	L
20	November 13	Detroit	4–2	Ottawa		Hodson	13–4–3	29	W
21	November 15	Detroit	2–5	St. Louis		Osgood	13–5–3	29	L
22	November 16	Detroit	3–3	Chicago	OT	Hodson	13–5–4	30	T
23	November 19	NY Islanders	3–2	Detroit		Osgood	13–6–4	30	L
24	November 21	Dallas	2–4	Detroit		Osgood	14–6–4	32	W
25	November 22	Detroit	5–2	Montreal		Osgood	15–6–4	34	W
26	November 26	Ottawa	1–4	Detroit		Hodson	16–6–4	36	W
27	November 28	Montreal	0–2	Detroit		Osgood	17–6–4	38	W

December: 8–3–4 (home: 4–1–1; road: 4–2–3)

Game	Date	Visitor	Score	Home	OT	Decision	Record	Points	Recap
28	December 1	Detroit	3–3	Vancouver	OT	Osgood	17–6–5	39	T
29	December 3	Detroit	4–3	Calgary		Osgood	18–6–5	41	W
30	December 5	Detroit	1–3	Edmonton		Osgood	18–7–5	41	L
31	December 9	Vancouver	5–7	Detroit		Hodson	19–7–5	43	W
32	December 12	Edmonton	3–2	Detroit		Osgood	19–8–5	43	L
33	December 14	Detroit	3–3	Phoenix	OT	Osgood	19–8–6	44	T
34	December 16	Detroit	1–5	San Jose		Hodson	19–9–6	44	L
35	December 17	Detroit	2–2	Colorado	OT	Osgood	19–9–7	45	T
36	December 19	New Jersey	4–5	Detroit		Osgood	20–9–7	47	W
37	December 22	Detroit	4–2	Boston		Osgood	21–9–7	49	W
38	December 23	Detroit	3–1	Buffalo		Osgood	22–9–7	51	W
39	December 26	Toronto	1–4	Detroit		Osgood	23–9–7	53	W
40	December 27	Detroit	8–1	Toronto		Osgood	24–9–7	55	W
41	December 29	Dallas	2–2	Detroit	OT	Osgood	24–9–8	56	T
42	December 31	St. Louis	2–5	Detroit		Osgood	25–9–8	58	W

January: 4–5–3 (home: 4–2–1; road: 0–3–2)

Game	Date	Visitor	Score	Home	OT	Decision	Record	Points	Recap
43	January 2	San Jose	4–1	Detroit		Osgood	25–10–8	58	L
44	January 4	Detroit	1–3	Chicago		Osgood	25–11–8	58	L
45	January 6	Phoenix	0–2	Detroit		Hodson	26–11–8	60	W
46	January 9	Detroit	3–3	Dallas	OT	Osgood	26–11–9	61	T
47	January 11	Washington	0–2	Detroit		Osgood	27–11–9	63	W
48	January 12	Detroit	1–1	NY Islanders	OT	Hodson	27–11–10	64	T
49	January 14	Vancouver	0–4	Detroit		Osgood	28–11–10	66	W
50	January 20	Detroit	1–3	New Jersrey		Osgood	28–12–10	66	L
51	January 21	Toronto	3–0	Detroit		Osgood	28–13–10	66	L
52	January 24	Philadelphia	0–1	Detroit		Osgood	29–13–10	68	W
53	January 28	Phoenix	4–4	Detroit	OT	Osgood	29–13–11	69	T
54	January 31	Detroit	2–4	Pittsburgh		Osgood	29–14–11	69	L

February: 3–1–2 (home: 1–0–1; road: 2–1–1)

Game	Date	Visitor	Score	Home	OT	Decision	Record	Points	Recap
55	February 1	Detroit	4–2	Washington		Hodson	30–14–11	71	W
56	February 3	Detroit	1–1	Florida	OT	Osgood	30–14–12	72	T
57	February 5	Detroit	5–4	Tampa Bay		Osgood	31–14–12	74	W
58	February 7	Detroit	1–4	St. Louis		Osgood	31–15–12	74	L
59	February 25	Los Angeles	1–1	Detroit	OT	Osgood	31–15–13	75	T
60	February 27	Florida	1–3	Detroit		Osgood	32–15–13	77	W

March: 7–5–2 (home: 3–1–2; road: 4–4–0)

Game	Date	Visitor	Score	Home	OT	Decision	Record	Points	Recap
61	March 2	Detroit	3–1	Phoenix		Osgood	33–15–13	79	W
62	March 4	Detroit	2–0	Anaheim		Hodson	34–15–13	81	W
63	March 5	Detroit	4–5	San Jose		Osgood	34–16–13	81	L
64	March 7	Detroit	1–2	Los Angeles		Osgood	34–17–13	81	L
65	March 10	Boston	6–3	Detroit		Osgood	34–18–13	81	L
66	March 12	Chicago	0–3	Detroit		Osgood	35–18–13	83	W
67	March 14	Detroit	1–6	Philadelphia		Osgood	35–19–13	83	L
68	March 17	Edmonton	3–4	Detroit		Maracle	36–19–13	85	W
69	March 18	Detroit	5–2	Toronto		Maracle	37–19–13	87	W
70	March 21	Detroit	4–3	NY Rangers		Hodson	38–19–13	89	W
71	March 23	Chicago	5–5	Detroit	OT	Maracle	38–19–14	90	T
72	March 26	Anaheim	3–3	Detroit	OT	Hodson	38–19–15	91	T
73	March 28	Detroit	2–3	St. Louis		Osgood	38–20–15	91	L
74	March 29	Buffalo	2–4	Detroit		Osgood	39–20–15	93	W

April: 5–3–0 (home: 4–0–0; road: 1–3–0)

Game	Date	Visitor	Score	Home	OT	Decision	Record	Points	Recap
75	April 1	Colorado	0–2	Detroit		Osgood	40–20–15	95	W
76	April 4	Detroit	3–2	Chicago		Osgood	41–20–15	97	W
77	April 7	St. Louis	3–5	Detroit		Osgood	42–20–15	99	W
78	April 9	Phoenix	1–5	Detroit		Osgood	43–20–15	101	W
79	April 11	NY Rangers	2–5	Detroit		Osgood	44–20–15	103	W
80	April 14	Detroit	1–2	Phoenix		Osgood	44–21–15	103	L
81	April 15	Detroit	1–3	Dallas		Osgood	44–22–15	103	L
82	April 18	Detroit	3–4	Colorado		Hodson	44–23–15	103	L

Legend: W Win (2 points) L Loss (0 points) T Tie (1 point)

=== Playoffs ===
1998 Stanley Cup playoffs
Western Conference Quarterfinals vs. (6) Phoenix Coyotes: Detroit won 4–2

Game	Date	Visitor	Score	Home	OT	Decision	Series	Recap
1	April 22	Phoenix	3–6	Detroit		Osgood	1–0	W
2	April 24	Phoenix	7–4	Detroit		Osgood	1–1	L
3	April 26	Detroit	2–3	Phoenix		Osgood	1–2	L
4	April 28	Detroit	4–2	Phoenix		Osgood	2–2	W
5	April 30	Phoenix	1–3	Detroit		Osgood	3–2	W
6	May 3	Detroit	5–2	Phoenix		Osgood	4–2	W

Western Conference Semifinals vs. (4) St. Louis Blues: Detroit won 4–2

Game	Date	Visitor	Score	Home	OT	Decision	Series	Recap
1	May 8	St. Louis	4–2	Detroit		Osgood	0–1	L
2	May 10	St. Louis	1–6	Detroit		Osgood	1–1	W
3	May 12	Detroit	3–2	St. Louis	2OT	Osgood	2–1	W
4	May 14	Detroit	5–2	St. Louis		Osgood	3–1	W
5	May 17	St. Louis	3–1	Detroit		Osgood	3–2	L
6	May 19	Detroit	6–1	St. Louis		Osgood	4–2	W

Western Conference Finals vs. (1) Dallas Stars: Detroit won 4–2

Game	Date	Visitor	Score	Home	OT	Decision	Series	Recap
1	May 24	Detroit	2–0	Dallas		Osgood	1–0	W
2	May 26	Detroit	1–3	Dallas		Osgood	1–1	L
3	May 29	Dallas	3–5	Detroit		Osgood	2–1	W
4	May 31	Dallas	2–3	Detroit		Osgood	3–1	W
5	June 3	Detroit	2–3	Dallas	OT	Osgood	3–2	L
6	June 5	Dallas	0–2	Detroit		Osgood	4–2	W

Stanley Cup Finals vs. (E4) Washington Capitals: Detroit won 4–0

Game	Date	Visitor	Score	Home	OT	Decision	Series	Recap
1	June 9	Washington	1–2	Detroit		Osgood	1–0	W
2	June 11	Washington	4–5	Detroit	OT	Osgood	2–0	W
3	June 13	Detroit	2–1	Washington		Osgood	3–0	W
4	June 16	Detroit	4–1	Washington		Osgood	4–0	W

Legend: W Win L Loss

== Player statistics ==
=== Scoring ===
- Position abbreviations: C = Center; D = Defense; G = Goaltender; LW = Left wing; RW = Right wing
- † = Joined team via a transaction (e.g., trade, waivers, signing) during the season. Stats reflect time with the Red Wings only.
- ‡ = Left team via a transaction (e.g., trade, waivers, release) during the season. Stats reflect time with the Red Wings only.

No.	Player	Pos	Regular season						Playoffs					
No.	Player	Pos	GP	G	A	Pts	+/-	PIM	GP	G	A	Pts	+/-	PIM
19	Steve Yzerman	C	75	24	45	69	3	46	22	6	18	24	10	22
5	Nicklas Lidstrom	D	80	17	42	59	22	18	22	6	13	19	12	8
14	Brendan Shanahan	LW	75	28	29	57	6	154	20	5	4	9	5	22
13	Vyacheslav Kozlov	LW	80	25	27	52	14	46	22	6	8	14	4	10
55	Larry Murphy	D	82	11	41	52	35	37	22	3	12	15	12	2
8	Igor Larionov	C	69	8	39	47	14	40	22	3	10	13	5	12
17	Doug Brown	C	80	19	23	42	17	12	9	4	2	6	−1	0
25	Darren McCarty	RW	71	15	22	37	0	157	22	3	8	11	9	34
20	Martin Lapointe	RW	79	15	19	34	0	106	21	9	6	15	6	20
41	Brent Gilchrist	LW	61	13	14	27	4	40	15	2	1	3	2	12
18	Kirk Maltby	LW	65	14	9	23	11	89	22	3	1	4	2	30
33	Kris Draper	C	64	13	10	23	5	45	19	1	3	4	4	12
96 (Note: Holmstrom wore number 15 until Mironov was acquired.)	Tomas Holmstrom	LW	57	5	17	22	6	44	22	7	12	19	9	16
44	Anders Eriksson	D	66	7	14	21	21	32	18	0	5	5	7	16
91	Sergei Fedorov	RW	21	6	11	17	10	25	22	10	10	20	0	12
11	Mathieu Dandenault	RW	68	5	12	17	5	43	3	1	0	1	−2	0
2	Viacheslav Fetisov	D	58	2	12	14	4	72	21	0	3	3	4	10
22	Mike Knuble	RW	53	7	6	13	2	16	3	0	1	1	0	0
3	Bob Rouse	D	71	1	11	12	−9	57	22	0	3	3	2	16
26	Joey Kocur	RW	63	6	5	11	7	92	18	4	0	4	−3	30
27	Aaron Ward	D	52	5	5	10	−1	47	—	—	—	—	—	—
15 (Note: Mironov wore number 51 in his first game.)	Dmitri Mironov†	D	11	2	5	7	0	4	7	0	3	3	1	14
4	Jamie Pushor‡	D	54	2	5	7	2	71	—	—	—	—	—	—
28	Yan Golubovsky	D	12	0	2	2	1	6	—	—	—	—	—	—
31	Kevin Hodson	G	21	0	0	0		2	1	0	0	0		0
21	Darryl Laplante	C	2	0	0	0	0	0	—	—	—	—	—	—
34	Jamie Macoun†	D	7	0	0	0	0	0	22	2	2	4	3	18
34	Norm Maracle	G	4	0	0	0		0	—	—	—	—	—	—
30	Chris Osgood	G	64	0	0	0		31	22	0	0	1		12

=== Goaltending ===
No.	Player	Regular season											Playoffs									
No.	Player	GP	GS	W	L	T	SA	GA	GAA	SV%	SO	TOI	GP	GS	W	L	SA	GA	GAA	SV%	SO	TOI
30	Chris Osgood	64	64	33	20	11	1,605	140	2.21	.913	6	3,806:39	22	22	16	6	588	48	2.12	.918	2	1,361:04
31	Kevin Hodson	21	16	9	3	3	444	44	2.67	.901	2	987:49	1	0	0	0	0	0	0.00	—	0	0:16
34	Norm Maracle	4	2	2	0	1	63	6	2.02	.905	0	178:15	—	—	—	—	—	—	—	—	—	—

== Awards and records ==
=== Awards ===
Nicklas Lidstrom was a runner-up for the James Norris Memorial Trophy.

Type	Award/honor	Recipient	Ref
League (annual)	Conn Smythe Trophy	Steve Yzerman	
League (annual)	NHL First All-Star Team	Nicklas Lidstrom (Defense)	
League (in-season)	NHL All-Star Game selection	Viacheslav Fetisov (Note: Fetisov and Shanahan were voted to the starting lineup.)	
League (in-season)	NHL All-Star Game selection	Igor Larionov (Note: Commissioner’s selection.)	
League (in-season)	NHL All-Star Game selection	Nicklas Lidstrom	
League (in-season)	NHL All-Star Game selection	Brendan Shanahan	

=== Milestones ===
Milestone	Player	Date	Ref
First game	Yan Golubovsky	December 12, 1997	
First game	Darryl Laplante	January 6, 1998	
First game	Norm Maracle	March 14, 1998	

== Transactions ==
The Red Wings were involved in the following transactions during the 1997-98 season.

=== Trades ===
Date	Details	
August 18, 1997	To San Jose Sharks Mike Vernon; 1999 5th-round pick (#149 overall)	To Detroit Red Wings 1998 2nd-round pick (#41 overall); 1999 2nd-round pick (#47 overall)
March 24, 1998	To Toronto Maple Leafs 1998 TB 4th-round pick (#87 overall)	To Detroit Red Wings Jamie Macoun
March 24, 1998	To Mighty Ducks of Anaheim Jamie Pushor; 1998 4th-round pick (#112 overall)	To Detroit Red Wings Dmitri Mironov

=== Signings ===
Date	Player	Contract term
July 2, 1997	Martin Lapointe	4-year
July 26, 1997	Bob Rouse	1-year
August 1, 1997	Igor Larionov	3-year
August 15, 1997	Joey Kocur	1-year
September 3, 1997	Jon Coleman	2-year
September 8, 1997	Viacheslav Fetisov	1-year
September 18, 1997	Vyacheslav Kozlov	3-year
January 7, 1998	Doug Brown	3-year
February 26, 1998	Sergei Fedorov	6-year (matched Hurricanes offer sheet)
March 13, 1998	Larry Murphy	2-year extension through 1999-2000 with 1-year option for 2000-01
March 20, 1998	Aren Miller	3-year
June 1, 1998	Jesse Wallin	3-year

=== Free agents ===
Date	Player	Team	Contract term
July 8, 1997	Brent Gilchrist	from Dallas Stars	3-year
August 1, 1997	Tomas Sandstrom	to Mighty Ducks of Anaheim	2-year
August 20, 1997	Mark Major	to Washington Capitals	

=== Waivers ===
Date	Player	Team
September 28, 1997	Tim Taylor	to Boston Bruins in waiver draft

== Draft picks ==
Below are the Detroit Red Wings' selections at the 1997 NHL entry draft, held on June 21, 1997 at Civic Arena in Pittsburgh, Pennsylvania.

Round	#	Player	Position	Nationality	College/Junior/Club team
2	49	Yuri Butsayev	LW	Russia	Lada Togliatti (Russia)
3	76	Petr Sykora	C	Czech Republic	HC Pardubice (Czech Republic)
4	102	Quintin Laing	LW	Canada	Kelowna Rockets (WHL)
5	129	John Wikstrom	D	Sweden	Lulea HF (Sweden)
6	157	B. J. Young	RW	United States	Red Deer Rebels (WHL)
7	186	Mike Laceby	C	Canada	Kingston Frontenacs (OHL)
8	213	Steve Wilejto	C	Canada	Prince Albert Raiders (WHL)
9	239	Greg Willers	D	Canada	Kingston Frontenacs (OHL)

Notes

- The Red Wings first-round pick went to the Carolina Hurricanes (formerly the Hartford Whalers) as the result of a trade on October 9, 1996 that sent Brendan Shanahan and Brian Glynn to Detroit in exchange for Paul Coffey, Keith Primeau and this pick (22nd overall).
