= Ryan VandenBussche =

Canadian ice hockey player (born 1973)

- Born: February 28, 1973 (age 53) Simcoe, Ontario, Canada
- Height: 6 ft 0 in (183 cm)
- Weight: 202 lb (92 kg; 14 st 6 lb)
- Position: Right wing
- Shot: Right
- Played for: New York Rangers; Chicago Blackhawks; Pittsburgh Penguins
- NHL draft: 173rd overall, 1992; Toronto Maple Leafs
- Playing career: 1993–2007
- Spouse: Lisa VandenBussche (m. 2010)
- Children: 2 (including Raya)

Ryan VandenBussche (born February 28, 1973) is a Canadian former professional ice hockey forward who played fourteen years of professional hockey, nine National Hockey League (NHL) seasons with the New York Rangers, Chicago Blackhawks, and Pittsburgh Penguins. He is best known for his pugilistic skills.

== Playing career ==
Drafted by the Toronto Maple Leafs in the 1992 NHL entry draft, 8th round, 173rd overall, VandenBussche spent his first seasons playing for various OHL and AHL teams.

On August 22, 1995, he was signed as an unrestricted free agent by the New York Rangers. After two seasons in the AHL with the Rangers' farm team, the Binghamton Rangers, VandenBussche finally made his NHL debut for the 1996–97 season playing 11 games.

The very next season, 1997–98, VandenBussche was split between four different teams in three different leagues. He played three games for the Indianapolis Ice of the IHL, fifteen games for the Hartford Wolf Pack of the AHL, sixteen games for the New York Rangers of the NHL, and since the Rangers traded him for Ryan Risidore on March 29, 1998, four games for the Chicago Blackhawks of the NHL.

VandenBussche remained a Blackhawk until the Pittsburgh Penguins signed him as an unrestricted free agent on July 12, 2004. On September 25, 2006, Jokerit of SM-liiga signed the forward for a try-out, which was terminated on November 5. After his tryout, VandenBussche signed with the New Mexico Scorpions as a player/coach, but retired in January for medical reasons.

VandenBussche was not known as a goal scorer or play maker; in 310 NHL games, he scored 10 goals and 10 assists. VandenBussche's role was as an enforcer. He has the distinction of being pound for pound one of the toughest enforcers at the NHL level, and the man who ended the career of Nick Kypreos in a pre-season game in 1997.

== Post career ==
In 2006 VandenBussche was charged with assault after he assaulted multiple officers and uttered death threats. He was cleared of the charges in 2008 due to a successful argument that his multiple concussions during his hockey career and a shove during the altercation rendered him a "non-insane automaton". VandenBussche and his wife Lisa currently sell real estate with his father Ron as Team VandenBussche with ReMax Erie Shores in Norfolk County, Ontario, Canada. Ryan is the founder of a charity called Stix n Pix which promotes the development of grass-roots hockey and music within the community and surrounding area. He has also partnered with Canadian Tire First Shift Program, which is an initiative to help get youth involved in hockey. VandenBussche is also the founder/President of New Leaf Canada Inc. which is a Nutraceutical Health and Wellness company. His role as an athlete ambassador advocates the benefits of plant based medicines.

VandenBussche was awarded the civilian Canadian Forces Medallion for Distinguished Service in 2017 for his multiple visits to overseas military bases, starting with a ball hockey game in Kandahar, Afghanistan in 2010.

== Career statistics ==
			Regular season					Playoffs
Season	Team	League	GP	G	A	Pts	PIM	GP	G	A	Pts	PIM
1989–90	Norwich Merchants	NDJHL	21	12	10	22	146	—	—	—	—	—
1990–91	Cornwall Royals	OHL	49	3	8	11	139	—	—	—	—	—
1991–92	Cornwall Royals	OHL	61	13	15	28	230	6	0	2	2	9
1992–93	St. John's Maple Leafs	AHL	1	0	0	0	0	—	—	—	—	—
1992–93	Newmarket Royals	OHL	30	15	12	27	161	—	—	—	—	—
1992–93	Guelph Storm	OHL	29	3	14	17	99	5	1	3	4	13
1993–94	St. John's Maple Leafs	AHL	44	4	10	14	124	—	—	—	—	—
1993–94	Springfield Indians	AHL	9	1	2	3	29	5	0	0	0	16
1994–95	St. John's Maple Leafs	AHL	53	2	13	15	239	3	0	0	0	17
1995–96	Binghamton Rangers	AHL	68	3	17	20	240	4	0	0	0	9
1996–97	Binghamton Rangers	AHL	38	8	11	19	133	—	—	—	—	—
1996–97	New York Rangers	NHL	11	1	0	1	30	—	—	—	—	—
1997–98	Indianapolis Ice	IHL	3	1	1	2	4	—	—	—	—	—
1997–98	Hartford Wolf Pack	AHL	15	2	0	2	45	—	—	—	—	—
1997–98	New York Rangers	NHL	16	1	0	1	38	—	—	—	—	—
1997–98	Chicago Blackhawks	NHL	4	0	1	1	5	—	—	—	—	—
1998–99	Portland Pirates	AHL	37	4	1	5	119	—	—	—	—	—
1998–99	Chicago Blackhawks	NHL	6	0	0	0	17	—	—	—	—	—
1998–99	Indianapolis Ice	IHL	34	3	10	13	130	—	—	—	—	—
1999–00	Chicago Blackhawks	NHL	52	0	1	1	143	—	—	—	—	—
2000–01	Chicago Blackhawks	NHL	64	2	5	7	146	—	—	—	—	—
2001–02	Chicago Blackhawks	NHL	50	1	2	3	103	1	0	0	0	0
2002–03	Chicago Blackhawks	NHL	22	0	0	0	58	—	—	—	—	—
2002–03	Norfolk Admirals	AHL	4	0	1	1	5	—	—	—	—	—
2003–04	Chicago Blackhawks	NHL	65	4	1	5	120	—	—	—	—	—
2004–05	Wilkes–Barre/Scranton Penguins	AHL	23	4	7	11	77	11	2	2	4	11
2005–06	Pittsburgh Penguins	NHL	20	1	0	1	42	—	—	—	—	—
2006–07	Jokerit	SM-l	15	0	0	0	39	—	—	—	—	—
2006–07	New Mexico Scorpions	CHL	9	0	3	3	29	—	—	—	—	—
AHL totals			292	28	62	90	1011	23	2	2	4	53
NHL totals			310	10	10	20	702	1	0	0	0	0
