= Norm Maracle =

Canadian ice hockey player (born 1974)

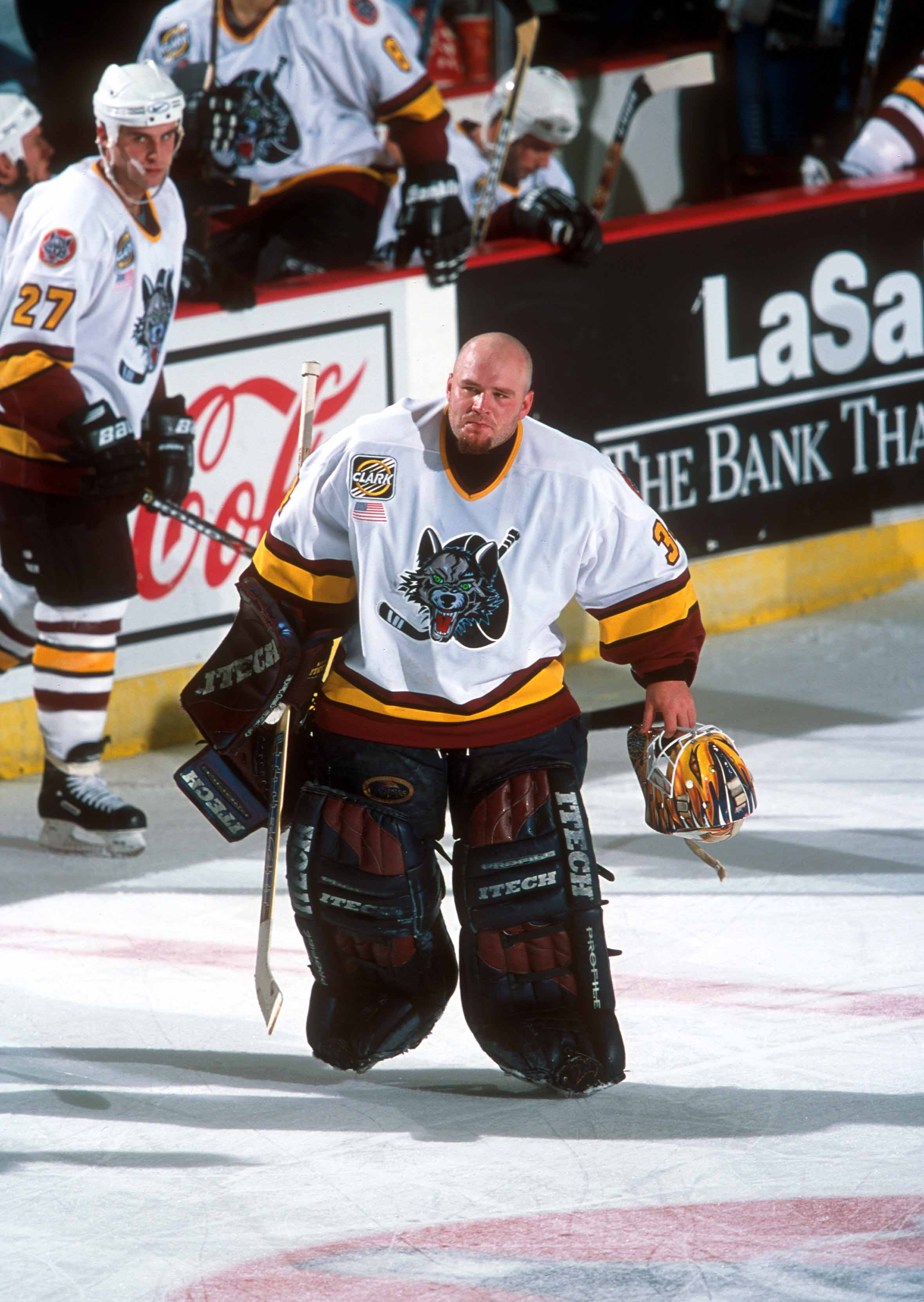
- Maracle with the Chicago Wolves during the 2001–02 season
- Born: October 2, 1974 (age 51) Belleville, Ontario, Canada
- Height: 5 ft 9 in (175 cm)
- Weight: 195 lb (88 kg; 13 st 13 lb)
- Position: Goaltender
- Caught: Left
- Played for: Detroit Red Wings; Atlanta Thrashers; Metallurg Magnitogorsk; Avangard Omsk; Iserlohn Roosters; HDD Olimpija Ljubljana; Kölner Haie
- NHL draft: 126th overall, 1993; Detroit Red Wings
- Playing career: 1994–2012

Norm Maracle (born October 2, 1974) is a Canadian former professional ice hockey goaltender. Prior to ending his career in Europe, Maracle played in the National Hockey League for the Detroit Red Wings and Atlanta Thrashers.

== Playing career ==
=== Junior ===
Maracle joined the WHL's Saskatoon Blades during the 1991–92 season and remained with them until the 1993–94 season. Maracle's level of play during the 1993–94 season would earn him the Del Wilson Trophy for best goaltender in the WHL. Prior to the 1993–94 seasons, the Detroit Red Wings drafted Maracle in the 5th Round, 126th overall, in the 1993 NHL Entry Draft.

=== Professional ===
==== Detroit ====
For the start of the 1994–95 season, Maracle was signed by the Detroit Red Wings and reassigned to their American Hockey League (AHL) affiliate, the Adirondack Red Wings, sharing goaltending duties with Kevin Hodson. For the next two seasons, Maracle remained in the AHL, posting prolific winning records and a high save percentage each season, but was not called up by the Red Wings due to their overwhelming goaltending depth, as he was the fourth goaltender behind Mike Vernon, Chris Osgood and Hodson. After he had retired, Maracle was honored into the Adirondack Hockey Hall of Fame in Glens Falls, New York, in 2018. He was one of three former members of the Detroit Red Wings affiliate, the Adirondack Red Wings, next to Neil Smith (ice hockey) and Chris Tancill.

While Maracle spent the 1997–98 season as the starting goaltender in Adirondack, he eventually received a call up from the Red Wings and posted a 2–0–1 record in four NHL appearances. He did not see any playoff action that season, where the Red Wings went on to win their second consecutive Stanley Cup championship. He was included on the team picture, and awarded a Stanley Cup ring. However, his name does not appear on the Stanley Cup because he did not play enough games to qualify.

Maracle challenged Hodson for the backup spot for the 1998–99 season. Maracle put up solid numbers during the season and as a result, became Detroit's backup goaltender to Osgood. Maracle appeared in 16 regular season contests, posting a 6–5–2 record and a 91.8% save percentage. Hodson, however, was sent to the Tampa Bay Lightning prior to the trade deadline so the Red Wings could acquire Bill Ranford as Detroit's third goaltender. Due to Ranford's strong showing towards the end of the regular season, the Red Wings kept Maracle on the roster, but designated him as the third goaltender. After the Red Wings defeated the Mighty Ducks of Anaheim in the opening round of the playoffs, they went on to face the Colorado Avalanche in the Conference Semifinals. Osgood was injured prior to the first game, making Ranford the starting goaltender and Maracle the backup. Maracle played in two games against Colorado, relieving Ranford both times. By the time Osgood returned, the Red Wings could not overcome the Avalanche and were eliminated. Not having lived up to expectations, Ranford was not re-signed at the end of the season, and Maracle also fell under scrutiny for underperforming in the playoffs. Maracle was left unprotected in the 1999 NHL Expansion Draft, and was claimed by the Atlanta Thrashers on June 25, 1999.

Maracle earned the nickname "Miracle" because despite being a borderline starting goaltender, he would occasionally have superb games (including three 50+ save performances).

==== Atlanta ====
With the 1999–2000 season in the NHL being the first for the Thrashers, there was some instability in the lineup. Maracle still managed to start in more games for the Thrashers than any of Atlanta's other four goalies (Damian Rhodes, Scott Fankhouser, Scott Langkow and Rick Tabaracci). However, Maracle finished the season with a 4–19–2 record and a save percentage of .890. Maracle's save percentage put him in 43rd place out of 83 eligible goaltenders (goalies who played at least 20 games in the NHL season). The team did not make the playoffs in the 1999–2000 season.

When Maracle reported for the 2000–01 training camp, his conditioning had become so poor that he was reassigned to the Orlando Solar Bears of the International Hockey League, Atlanta's minor league affiliate. Maracle posted an impressive 33–13–3 record at the minor level, his eight shutouts with Orlando were a team record prior to the team folding. He also helped backstop the Solar Bears to their first and only Turner Cup victory in the league's final year of operation. His strong minor league performance earned him 13 appearances for the Thrashers during that season. Though his record for the Thrashers was 2–8–3, his save percentage slightly improved.

Maracle appeared in a single NHL game for the 2001–02 season, a 3–0 loss to the Washington Capitals on November 10, 2001; which was his last NHL game. Maracle spent the rest of the season with the Thrashers' new minor league affiliate, the Chicago Wolves of the AHL, as the starting goaltender with Pasi Nurminen backing him up.

For the 2002–03 Season, Maracle remained in the minors while Nurminen ascended the depth charts to become Atlanta's starting goaltender, with Milan Hnilicka, Byron Dafoe and Frédéric Cassivi supporting him. Having run out of options to leave the minors in the North American system, Maracle signed with Magnitogorsk Metallurg of the RSL on June 8, 2003.

==== Europe ====
Maracle, better conditioned and in a new system, appeared in 46 contests for Magnitogorsk Metallurg for the 2003–04 season.

Though he signed a contract with the Nurnburg Ice Tigers of the Deutsche Liga at the start of the 2004–05 season, he never appeared in a contest for them. Maracle then signed with the 2004 RSL Champion Avangard Omsk on November 5, 2004, with whom Maracle won the European Cup Championship. Maracle was the starting goaltender for Avangard in 2005–06 season as well.

In 2006–07, Maracle was the backup to Alexander Fomichev. The team placed third overall in the league and lost the semi-finals of the Russian Super League Championships to the eventual champions, Metallurg Magnitogorsk.

For the 2007–08 season, Maracle signed with the Iserlohn Roosters in Germany's Deutsche Eishockey Liga. Maracle became a favorite amongst Roosters fans, especially for his on ice antics including break dancing.

Maracle joined HDD Olimpija Ljubljana of the Austrian Hockey League in the 2009–10 season, from January to April 2010 he transferred to return to the DEL for Kölner Haie.

Maracle signed with Starbulls Rosenheim, a team in Germany's 2nd tier Bundesliga, in July 2010, he remained as the club's first choice keeper in two seasons in Rosenheim. On May 25, 2012, the Starbulls announced that due to personal issues, Maracle would not be returning to the team.

== Personal life ==
Maracle was born in Belleville, Ontario, but grew up in Calgary, Alberta. For four years, he coached young players in Whapmagoostui, in northern Quebec. Maracle is a Mohawk from the Tyendinaga Mohawk Territory. This Territory is an Indigenous Reserve located near Belleville, Ontario.

== Career statistics ==
=== Regular season and playoffs ===
			Regular season									Playoffs
Season	Team	League	GP	W	L	T/OT	MIN	GA	SO	GAA	SV%	GP	W	L	MIN	GA	SO	GAA	SV%
1990–91	Calgary North Stars	AMHL	29	—	—	—	1740	99	0	3.43	—	—	—	—	—	—	—	—	—
1991–92	Saskatoon Blades	WHL	29	13	6	3	1529	87	1	3.41	.946	15	9	5	860	37	0	3.38	—
1992–93	Saskatoon Blades	WHL	53	27	18	3	2939	160	1	3.27	—	9	4	5	569	33	0	3.48	—
1993–94	Saskatoon Blades	WHL	56	41	13	1	3219	148	2	2.76	.918	16	11	5	940	48	1	3.06	—
1994–95	Adirondack Red Wings	AHL	39	12	15	2	1997	119	0	3.57	.896	—	—	—	—	—	—	—	—
1995–96	Adirondack Red Wings	AHL	54	24	18	6	2949	135	2	2.75	.905	1	0	1	30	4	0	8.11	—
1996–97	Adirondack Red Wings	AHL	68	34	22	9	3843	173	5	2.70	.916	4	1	3	192	10	1	3.13	—
1997–98	Adirondack Red Wings	AHL	66	27	29	8	3709	190	1	3.07	.912	3	0	3	180	10	0	3.33	—
1997–98	Detroit Red Wings	NHL	4	2	0	1	178	6	0	2.02	.905	—	—	—	—	—	—	—	—
1998–99	Adirondack Red Wings	AHL	6	3	3	0	359	18	0	3.01	.908	—	—	—	—	—	—	—	—
1998–99	Detroit Red Wings	NHL	16	6	5	2	821	31	0	2.27	.918	2	0	0	58	3	0	3.10	.864
1999–00	Atlanta Thrashers	NHL	32	4	19	2	1618	94	1	3.49	.890	—	—	—	—	—	—	—	—
2000–01	Orlando Solar Bears	IHL	51	33	13	3	2963	100	8	2.02	.925	16	12	4	1003	37	1	2.21	—
2000–01	Atlanta Thrashers	NHL	13	2	8	3	753	43	0	3.43	.894	—	—	—	—	—	—	—	—
2001–02	Chicago Wolves	AHL	51	21	25	4	2919	141	3	2.90	.906	2	0	1	55	4	0	4.36	.818
2001–02	Atlanta Thrashers	NHL	1	0	1	0	60	3	0	3.00	.850	—	—	—	—	—	—	—	—
2002–03	Chicago Wolves	AHL	49	22	18	6	2794	134	2	2.88	.906	8	3	4	462	17	1	2.21	.915
2003–04	Metallurg Magnitogorsk	RSL	46	—	—	—	2457	82	8	2.00	.925	14	—	—	—	—	—	—	—
2004–05	Avangard Omsk	RSL	28	—	—	—	—	—	—	—	—	10	—	—	—	—	—	—	—
2005–06	Avangard Omsk	RSL	44	—	—	—	2565	91	5	2.13	.909	13	—	—	—	—	—	—	—
2006–07	Avangard Omsk	RSL	12	—	—	—	—	—	—	—	—	6	—	—	—	—	—	—	—
2007–08	Iserlohn Roosters	DEL	50	24	13	0	1596	155	4	3.18	.911	10	7	3	4	—	—	—	—
2008–09	Iserlohn Roosters	DEL	33	8	13	0	947	106	0	3.43	.899	—	—	—	—	—	—	—	—
2009–10	HDD Tilia Olimpija	EBEL	25	—	—	—	—	—	—	3.58	.901	—	—	—	—	—	—	—	—
2009–10	Kölner Haie	DEL	5	0	3	0	128	14	0	3.22	.901	3	—	—	—	—	—	—	—
2010–11	Starbulls Rosenheim	2.GBun	44	24	19	0	2626	110	0	2.51	—	11	—	—	—	—	—	—	—
2011–12	Starbulls Rosenheim	2.GBun	45	23	21	0	2604	111	3	2.56	—	—	—	—	—	—	—	—	—
NHL totals			66	14	33	8	3430	177	1	3.10	.897	2	0	0	58	3	0	3.10	.864

== Awards ==
- WHL East Second All-Star Team – 1993
- WHL East First All-Star Team – 1994
