= Scott Fraser (ice hockey) =

Canadian ice hockey player (born 1972)

- Born: May 3, 1972 (age 53) Moncton, New Brunswick, Canada
- Height: 6 ft 2 in (188 cm)
- Weight: 206 lb (93 kg; 14 st 10 lb)
- Position: Forward
- Shot: Right
- Played for: Montreal Canadiens; Edmonton Oilers; New York Rangers
- National team: Canada
- NHL draft: 193rd overall, 1991; Montreal Canadiens
- Playing career: 1994–1999

Scott Robert Fraser (born May 3, 1972) is a Canadian former professional ice hockey player. He played 71 games in the National Hockey League with the Montreal Canadiens, Edmonton Oilers, and New York Rangers between 1995 and 1999. He played right wing/centre and shot right-handed.

== Playing career ==
=== Amateur career ===
Growing up in New Brunswick, Fraser played with the Moncton Minor Hockey Association and was recognised as a First Team National Midget All-Star. Despite growing up in Moncton, he chose to play with the Notre Dame Hounds in the Saskatchewan Junior Hockey League in order to improve his skills. In his senior year, he helped the Hounds reach the regional championships. He scored four goals, including the game winner, to help them clinch the Air Canada Cup trophy, Saskatchewan Amateur Hockey Association midget AAA championship, and the Saskatchewan Midget AAA Hockey League regular-season title.

Upon graduating from high school, Fraser began his collegiate career with Dartmouth College in the ECAC Conference. In his freshman season, Fraser ranked second among team rookies with 10 goals and 10 assists for 20 points. He was subsequently drafted in the 9th round, 193rd overall by the Montreal Canadiens in the 1991 NHL entry draft. He was also named to the All–ECAC Hockey Rookie Team for 1990–91. After being drafted, Fraser returned to Dartmouth where he experienced a disappointing 1991–92 season. The Big Green struggled to win games and they experienced a 16-game losing streak that Fraser helped snap on February 10, 1992. He subsequently finished the season with 11 goals and seven assists for a career-low 18 points. Despite this, he was still the Big Green's leading scorer.

Following the disappointing 1991–92 season, Fraser bounced back and had a career year during the 1992–1993 season. Although he began the season on a slow start, he experienced a resurgence during the back half of the season and began putting up points. By February 12, 1993, Fraser ranked fifth among all league scorers with 22 points through ECAC games and 28 overall. By early March, he had accumulated 20 goals and 22 assists for 38 points and was subsequently named Team MVP. His 19 goals in ECAC play ranked him second in the entire conference. Fraser finished the season with 44 points in 26 games to clinch the team's top scorer award and earn ECAC Second Team All-Ivy honors. His efforts helped the Big Green finish with an 11–6 record, their best record since 1979–80, and he spent the summer training with the Canada men's national ice hockey team.

Upon returning to Dartmouth for the 1993–94 season, coach Roger Demment praised Fraiser for improving every aspect of his game during the summer. He began the season by tallying six goals through his first seven games, including a hat-trick in an 11–4 win over the University of Vermont on November 22, 1993. As a result of his successful start to the season, Fraser participated in the Spengler Cup with Team Canada. He subsequently became the first Big Green player to compete at the highest level of international play since Carey Wilson in 1984. Upon returning from the competition, Fraser became the first Big Gren player in 13 years to record their 50th career collegiate goal. In February, he became the first Dartmouth player since 1984 to reach the 100 points milestone in his collegiate career. Despite his efforts, the Big Green were eliminated from playoff contention.

=== Professional ===
After college Fraser joined the Canadiens' minor league affiliate, the Fredericton Canadiens. He played two seasons in Fredericton, including a productive 1995–1996 campaign, where he scored 74 points in 58 games. This play allowed Fraser to make his NHL debut with the Montreal Canadiens that year, appearing in 14 games and scoring 2 points. Fraser began the 1996–1997 season with the Fredericton Canadiens but was traded to the Calgary Flames early in the season. Fraser played the majority of the season with the Saint John Flames, scoring 32 points in 37 games.

Fraser signed with the Edmonton Oilers for the 1997–98 season. He played the majority of year in the minors, with the Hamilton Bulldogs, where his play allowed him to return to the NHL with the Oilers for the last few months of the season. Once up with the Oilers, he scored 23 points in 29 games and earned a full-time spot with the Oilers for the playoffs, appearing in 11 games and scoring 2 points.

Fraser signed as a free agent with the New York Rangers for 1998–99. He appeared in 28 games with the Rangers, scoring just 6 points, and was sent to the Hartford Wolf Pack for the remainder of the season, scoring 37 points in 36 games with that club.

Following the 1998–99 season Fraser retired from hockey.

After retirement, he earned an MBA at Babson College.

== Career statistics ==
=== Regular season and playoffs ===
			Regular season					Playoffs
Season	Team	League	GP	G	A	Pts	PIM	GP	G	A	Pts	PIM
1987–88	Moncton Flyers	NBMAAAHL	—	—	—	—	—	—	—	—	—	—
1988–89	Wexford Raiders	MetJBHL	42	3	13	16	54	—	—	—	—	—
1989–90	Wexford Raiders	MetJBHL	42	2	13	15	34	—	—	—	—	—
1989–90	Notre Dame Hounds	SJHL	13	3	3	6	6	—	—	—	—	—
1990–91	Dartmouth College	ECAC	24	10	10	20	30	—	—	—	—	—
1991–92	Dartmouth College	ECAC	24	11	7	18	60	—	—	—	—	—
1992–93	Dartmouth College	ECAC	26	21	23	44	13	—	—	—	—	—
1992–93	Canadian National Team	Intl	5	1	0	1	0	—	—	—	—	—
1993–94	Dartmouth College	ECAC	24	17	13	30	26	—	—	—	—	—
1993–94	Canadian National Team	Intl	4	0	1	1	4	—	—	—	—	—
1994–95	Fredericton Canadiens	AHL	65	23	25	48	36	16	3	5	8	14
1994–95	Wheeling Thunderbirds	ECHL	8	4	2	6	8	—	—	—	—	—
1995–96	Montreal Canadiens	NHL	14	2	0	2	4	—	—	—	—	—
1995–96	Fredericton Canadiens	AHL	58	37	37	74	43	10	9	7	16	2
1996–97	Fredericton Canadiens	AHL	7	3	8	11	0	—	—	—	—	—
1996–97	Carolina Monarchs	AHL	18	9	19	28	12	—	—	—	—	—
1996–97	Saint John Flames	AHL	37	22	10	32	24	—	—	—	—	—
1996–97	San Antonio Dragons	IHL	8	0	1	1	2	—	—	—	—	—
1997–98	Edmonton Oilers	NHL	29	12	11	23	6	11	1	1	2	0
1997–98	Hamilton Bulldogs	AHL	50	29	32	61	26	—	—	—	—	—
1998–99	New York Rangers	NHL	28	2	4	6	14	—	—	—	—	—
1998–99	Hartford Wolf Pack	AHL	36	13	24	37	20	6	4	3	7	4
AHL totals			271	136	155	291	161	32	16	15	31	20
NHL totals			71	16	15	31	24	11	1	1	2	0

== Awards and honors ==
Award	Year
All-ECAC Hockey Rookie Team	1990–91
All-ECAC Hockey Second Team	1992–93
