= Ladislav Benýšek =

Czech ice hockey player (born 1975)

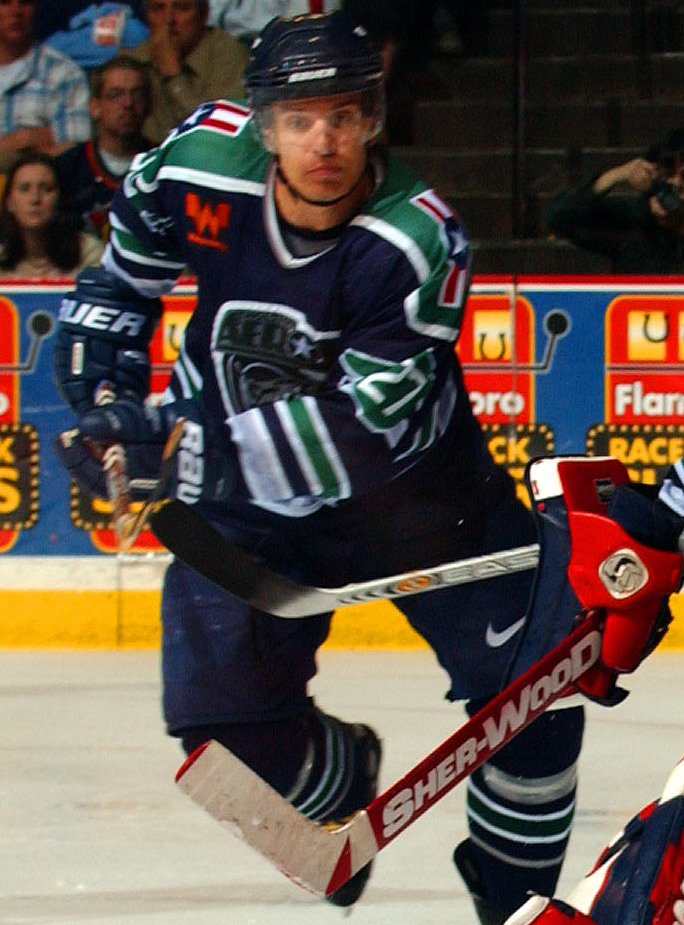
- Benýšek with the Houston Aeros in 2003
- Born: March 25, 1975 (age 51) Olomouc, Czechoslovakia
- Height: 6 ft 2 in (188 cm)
- Weight: 190 lb (86 kg; 13 st 8 lb)
- Position: Defence
- Shot: Left
- Played for: Braehead Clan; HC Valpellice; HC Asiago; HC Fassa; Totempo HvIK; HC Rouen; Sparta Praha; Leksands IF; HIFK; Edmonton Oilers; Minnesota Wild; HC Olomouc
- National team: Czech Republic
- NHL draft: 266th overall, 1994; Edmonton Oilers
- Playing career: 1992–2013

Ladislav Benýšek (born March 25, 1975) is a Czech former professional ice hockey defenceman who played 161 games in the National Hockey League with the Edmonton Oilers and Minnesota Wild between 1997 and 2003. The rest of his career, which lasted from 1992 to 2013, was mainly spent in various European leagues. Internationally Benýšek played for the Czech national team at three World Championships, winning gold in both 1999 and 2000.

== Career ==
Benýšek was selected by the Oilers in the 11th round of the 1994 NHL entry draft, 266th overall, after spending the previous season with his hometown HC Olomouc of the Czech league. Following the draft, Benýšek came over to North America, and spent the 1994–95 season with the Cape Breton Oilers, Edmonton's American Hockey League farm team.

Benýšek returned to Europe for the next two seasons, playing for Olomouc and Sparta Praha. Electing to again spend a season in North America, Benýšek played his first NHL hockey in the 1997–98 season, going pointless in two games. Aside from that brief stint, however, Benýšek was again confined to the AHL, where he played for the Hamilton Bulldogs. Despite eventually being claimed in the 1999 NHL Waiver Draft by the Mighty Ducks of Anaheim, Benýšek would spend the next three seasons back with Sparta Praha.

It was not until the 2000 NHL Expansion Draft, when the newly formed Minnesota Wild selected Benýšek from the Ducks that he got the opportunity to play regular minutes. For the next two seasons, Benýšek was an integral part of the Wild blueline. In his third season with the Wild, Benysek played only 14 games before being assigned to the AHL's Houston Aeros. Following the completion of the season, Benýšek returned to Europe, where he joined HIFK in Finland's SM-liiga and also had a spell in Sweden with Leksands IF. In 2006, Benýšek rejoined Sparta Praha for a third spell which lasted one season before he moved to France's Ligue Magnus for Dragons de Rouen. In 2008, Benýšek moved to Denmark's Oddset Ligaen with TOTEMPO HvIK. He then spent three seasons in Italy before moving to the United Kingdom to play for the Braehead Clan based in Glasgow, Scotland, where he would play just nine games, before retiring.

== Career statistics ==
=== Regular season and playoffs ===
			Regular season					Playoffs
Season	Team	League	GP	G	A	Pts	PIM	GP	G	A	Pts	PIM
1992–93	HC Olomouc	CSSR	3	0	0	0	0	—	—	—	—	—
1993–94	HC Olomouc U20	CZE U20	—	—	—	—	—	—	—	—	—	—
1994–95	Cape Breton Oilers	AHL	58	2	7	9	54	—	—	—	—	—
1995–96	HC Olomouc	CZE	33	2	4	6	12	4	0	0	0	8
1996–97	HC Olomouc	CZE	15	0	1	1	6	—	—	—	—	—
1996–97	Sparata Praha	CZE	33	3	5	8	28	5	0	0	0	2
1997–98	Edmonton Oilers	NHL	2	0	0	0	0	—	—	—	—	—
1997–98	Hamilton Bulldogs	AHL	53	2	14	16	29	9	1	1	2	2
1997–98	Sparta Praha	CZE	3	0	0	0	4	—	—	—	—	—
1998–99	Sparta Praha	CZE	49	8	10	18	45	8	0	1	1	2
1999–00	Sparta Praha	CZE	51	1	5	6	47	9	0	0	0	4
2000–01	Minnesota Wild	NHL	71	2	5	7	38	—	—	—	—	—
2001–02	Minnesota Wild	NHL	74	1	7	8	28	—	—	—	—	—
2002–03	Minnesota Wild	NHL	14	0	0	0	8	—	—	—	—	—
2002–03	Houston Aeros	AHL	39	0	4	4	23	18	0	3	3	6
2003–04	HIFK	FIN	39	2	1	3	14	13	0	0	0	2
2004–05	HIFK	FIN	8	0	0	0	6	—	—	—	—	—
2004–05	Leksands IF	SWE-2	16	1	0	1	30	—	—	—	—	—
2005–06	HIFK	FIN	6	0	2	2	0	—	—	—	—	—
2005–06	Leksands IF	SWE	38	1	1	2	42	—	—	—	—	—
2006–07	Sparta Praha	CZE	41	0	1	1	32	16	1	0	1	6
2007–08	HC Rouen	FRA	26	2	14	16	30	9	0	1	1	4
2008–09	Totempo HvIK	DEN	39	1	9	10	62	—	—	—	—	—
2009–10	HC Fassa	ITA	34	2	3	5	24	6	0	0	0	4
2010–11	HC Asiago	ITA	27	1	4	5	41	17	1	1	2	4
2011–12	SV Kaltern	ITA-2	17	4	2	6	14	—	—	—	—	—
2011–12	HC Valpellice	ITA	10	1	3	4	2	5	0	0	0	5
2012–13	Braehead Clan	EIHL	9	0	0	0	0	—	—	—	—	—
CSSR/CZE totals			228	14	26	40	174	42	1	1	2	22
NHL totals			161	3	12	15	74	—	—	—	—	—

=== International ===
Year	Team	Event	GP	G	A	Pts	PIM
1997	Czech Republic	WC	9	0	1	1	6
1999	Czech Republic	WC	4	0	0	0	0
2000	Czech Republic	WC	9	1	0	1	2
Senior totals			22	1	1	2	8
