= Brantt Myhres =

Canadian ice hockey player

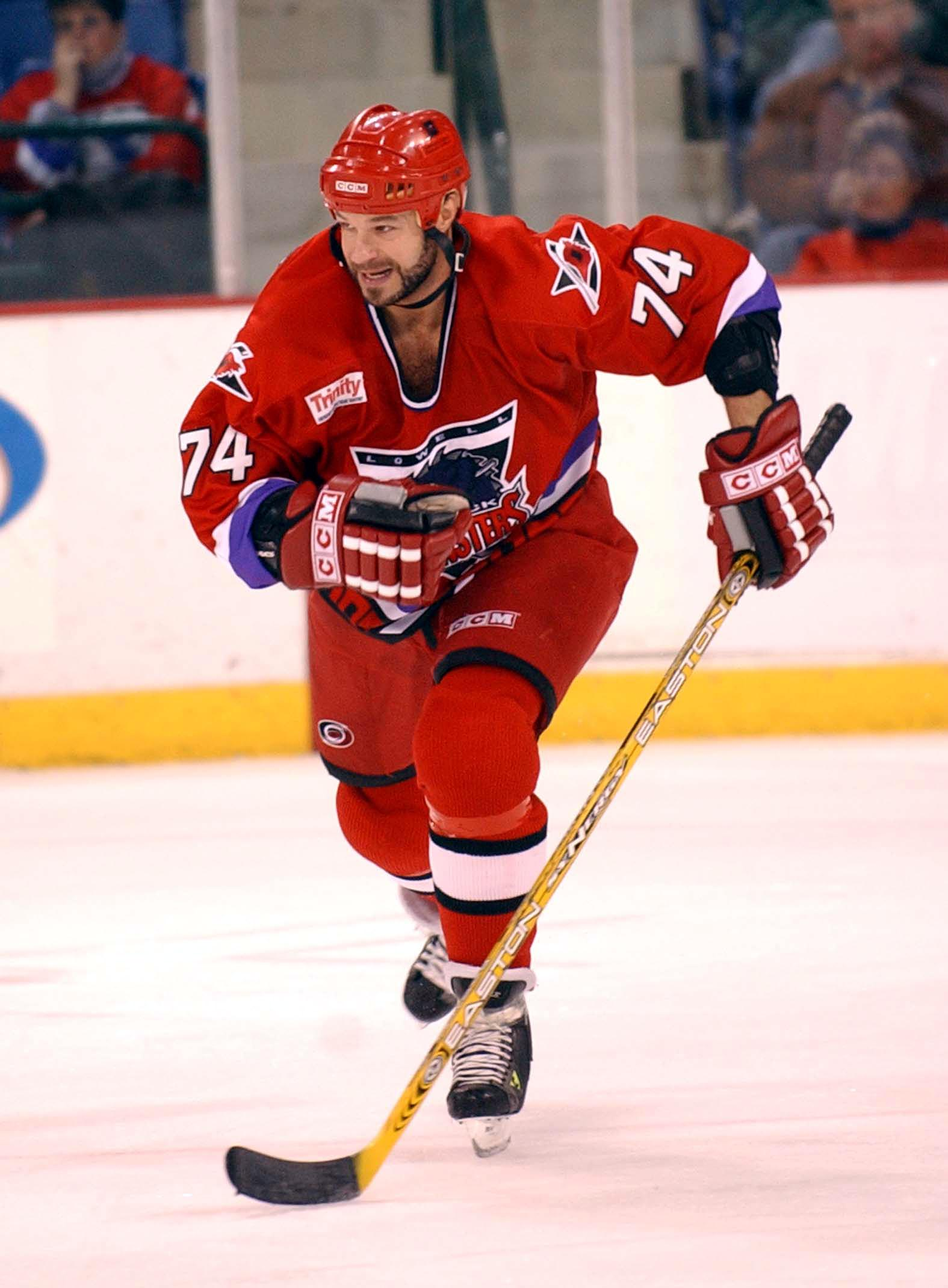
- Myhres with the Lowell Lock Monsters in 2004
- Born: March 18, 1974 (age 52) Edmonton, Alberta, Canada
- Height: 6 ft 4 in (193 cm)
- Weight: 220 lb (100 kg; 15 st 10 lb)
- Position: Left wing
- Shot: Right
- Played for: Tampa Bay Lightning; Philadelphia Flyers; San Jose Sharks; Nashville Predators; Washington Capitals; Boston Bruins; Newcastle Vipers
- NHL draft: 97th overall, 1992; Tampa Bay Lightning
- Playing career: 1994–2006

Brantt Robert Myhres (born March 18, 1974) is a Canadian former professional ice hockey winger. He was drafted by the Tampa Bay Lightning in the fifth round, 97th overall in the 1992 NHL entry draft.

== Playing career ==
Myhres played for the Tampa Bay Lightning, Philadelphia Flyers, San Jose Sharks, Nashville Predators, Washington Capitals, and Boston Bruins. During his career, Myhres struggled with substance abuse. While a member of the Flyers in 1997, he became the second player in league history to enter the NHL's voluntary Substance Abuse and Behavioral Health program, which he reentered in September 1998. He was suspended four times by the NHL for failing drug tests and was eventually banned from the league for life. After becoming clean and sober and studying substance abuse behavioral health at Mount Royal University in Calgary, Myhres was hired by the Los Angeles Kings in September 2015 as the team's player assistance director.

== Career statistics ==
=== Regular season and playoffs ===
			Regular season					Playoffs
Season	Team	League	GP	G	A	Pts	PIM	GP	G	A	Pts	PIM
1990–91	Portland Winter Hawks	WHL	59	2	7	9	125	—	—	—	—	—
1991–92	Portland Winter Hawks	WHL	4	0	2	2	22	—	—	—	—	—
1991–92	Lethbridge Hurricanes	WHL	53	4	11	15	359	5	0	0	0	36
1992–93	Lethbridge Hurricanes	WHL	64	13	35	48	277	3	0	0	0	11
1993–94	Lethbridge Hurricanes	WHL	34	10	21	31	103	—	—	—	—	—
1993–94	Spokane Chiefs	WHL	27	10	22	32	139	3	1	4	5	7
1993–94	Atlanta Knights	IHL	2	0	0	0	17	—	—	—	—	—
1994–95	Atlanta Knights	IHL	40	5	5	10	213	—	—	—	—	—
1994–95	Tampa Bay Lightning	NHL	15	2	0	2	81	—	—	—	—	—
1995–96	Atlanta Knights	IHL	12	0	2	2	58	—	—	—	—	—
1996–97	Tampa Bay Lightning	NHL	47	3	1	4	136	—	—	—	—	—
1996–97	San Antonio Dragons	IHL	12	0	0	0	98	—	—	—	—	—
1997–98	Philadelphia Phantoms	AHL	18	4	4	8	67	—	—	—	—	—
1997–98	Philadelphia Flyers	NHL	23	0	0	0	169	—	—	—	—	—
1998–99	Kentucky Thoroughblades	AHL	4	0	0	0	16	—	—	—	—	—
1998–99	San Jose Sharks	NHL	30	1	0	1	116	—	—	—	—	—
1999–00	Kentucky Thoroughblades	AHL	10	1	5	6	18	7	0	1	1	21
1999–00	San Jose Sharks	NHL	13	0	1	1	97	—	—	—	—	—
2000–01	Milwaukee Admirals	IHL	6	0	1	1	10	—	—	—	—	—
2000–01	Nashville Predators	NHL	20	0	0	0	28	—	—	—	—	—
2000–01	Portland Pirates	AHL	9	1	0	1	53	—	—	—	—	—
2000–01	Washington Capitals	NHL	5	0	0	0	29	—	—	—	—	—
2002–03	Providence Bruins	AHL	63	3	10	13	185	4	0	0	0	2
2002–03	Boston Bruins	NHL	1	0	0	0	31	—	—	—	—	—
2004–05	Lowell Lock Monsters	AHL	29	1	1	2	77	4	0	0	0	9
2005–06	Omaha Ak-Sar-Ben Knights	AHL	34	4	2	6	78	—	—	—	—	—
2006–07	Newcastle Vipers	EIHL	5	1	0	1	11	—	—	—	—	—
NHL totals			154	6	2	8	687	—	—	—	—	—
