= Kevin Hodson =

Canadian ice hockey player

- Born: March 27, 1972 (age 54) Winnipeg, Manitoba, Canada
- Height: 6 ft 0 in (183 cm)
- Weight: 182 lb (83 kg; 13 st 0 lb)
- Position: Goaltender
- Caught: Left
- Played for: Detroit Red Wings; Tampa Bay Lightning
- NHL draft: Undrafted
- Playing career: 1995–2003

Kevin Hodson (born March 27, 1972) is a Canadian former professional ice hockey goaltender. Hodson played professionally in the NHL and AHL before ending his playing career in the Finnish SM-liiga in 2003–04.

Hodson suffered from Wolff-Parkinson-White syndrome (rapid heart beat) during his time in the NHL, and affectionately earned the nickname "Ticker" from teammates.

== Amateur career ==
As a youth, Hodson played in the 1985 Quebec International Pee-Wee Hockey Tournament with the Winnipeg South Monarchs minor ice hockey team.

Hodson joined the OHL's Sault Ste. Marie Greyhounds during the 1990–91 season. Hodson backstopped the Greyhounds to their first ever Memorial Cup championship during the 1992–93 season. Hodson was also selected the top goaltender of the 1993 Memorial Cup tournament. Even with his strong OHL and Memorial Cup showing, Hodson went undrafted.

== Professional career ==
=== Chicago ===
Hodson turned pro in 1992 after signing with the Chicago Blackhawks and spent the 1992–93 season with both his Junior Team and the IHL's Indianapolis Ice, where he posted a 5–9 record.

=== Detroit ===
After that season was finished, Hodson signed with the Detroit Red Wings and was sent to their AHL affiliate, the Adirondack Red Wings, for 1993–94 and 1994–95 seasons, as Detroit had enough goaltending depth with Chris Osgood, Mike Vernon, Bob Essensa, Tim Cheveldae, Vincent Riendeau, and Peter Ing alternating goaltending duties at some point during those seasons. Hodson made his NHL debut with the Detroit Red Wings during the 1995–96 Season, where he shut out the Blackhawks 3–0. Hodson would go on to post a 2–0–0 record for that year.

During the 1996–97 Season in which the Red Wings would eventually win the Stanley Cup, Hodson remained as the Red Wings' Number 3 Goalie and as such, only saw 6 games that season, posting a 2–2–1 record. Since Hodson spent the majority of the season with the Red Wings, Detroit included his name on the Cup, even though did not officially qualify.

During the off-season, Vernon was traded to the San Jose Sharks, moving Hodson to the backup position for the 1997–98 Season. Hodson posted a 9–3–3 record in 21 regular season games as the Red Wings won the Stanley Cup for the 2nd straight season.

For the 1998–99 Season, Norm Maracle challenged Hodson for the backup goaltender role in Detroit. Given Maracle's level of play, Hodson was traded to the Tampa Bay Lightning in a deal that brought Bill Ranford and Wendel Clark to the Red Wings on March 23, 1999.

=== Tampa Bay ===
Hodson went 2–1–1 in the five games with Tampa Bay before suffering a groin injury which ended his season.

The 1999–2000 season found Hodson serving as a backup to Dan Cloutier, who was Hodson's backup in 1993 with the Sault Ste. Marie Greyhounds. Hodson's record in 24 games that year was 2–7–4. Hodson was assigned to Tampa Bay's minor league affiliate, the Detroit Vipers and was later dealt to the Montreal Canadiens on June 2, 2000 for a seventh round pick in that year's entry draft.

Hodson remained inactive until the 2002–03 season, when he was re-signed by Tampa Bay as the backup goaltender to Nikolai Khabibulin. Hodson posted a 0–3–1 record in seven games with Tampa Bay that season.

On January 15, 2003, Tampa Bay made a trade with the Boston Bruins that brought goaltender John Grahame to the team as Khabibulin's new backup. Rather than accept reassignment to the minors, Hodson announced his retirement from on January 16, 2003.

=== Career in Europe ===
On November 6, 2003, Hodson was signed as a free agent by Jokerit of the Finnish SM-liiga, where he posted a 1–1-1 record before leaving the team in mid-season.

== After hockey ==
Kevin Hodson returned to Sault Ste. Marie, Ontario and earned a Bachelor of Business Administration Degree from Algoma University. Hodson began a career as a financial advisor with Edward Jones, and in 2012 left the firm to join with RBC Dominion Securities.

== Awards ==
- Memorial Cup Tournament All-Star Team (1993)
- Member of 1992–93 Memorial Cup Champion Sault Ste. Marie Greyhounds
- Member of 1996–97, 1997–98 Stanley Cup Champion Detroit Red Wings
- Outstanding Goalie Hap Emms Memorial Trophy (Memorial Cup 1993)
- 1993 OHL All-star team

== Career statistics ==
=== Regular season and playoffs ===
			Regular season									Playoffs
Season	Team	League	GP	W	L	T	MIN	GA	SO	GAA	SV%	GP	W	L	MIN	GA	SO	GAA	SV%
1990–91	Sault Ste. Marie Greyhounds	OHL	30	18	11	0	1638	88	2	3.22	.884	10	9	1	600	28	0	2.80	—
1991–92	Sault Ste. Marie Greyhounds	OHL	50	28	12	4	2722	151	0	3.33	.896	18	12	6	1116	59	1	3.17	—
1992–93	Sault Ste. Marie Greyhounds	OHL	26	18	5	2	1470	76	1	3.10	.896	8	8	0	448	17	0	2.28	—
1992–93	Indianapolis Ice	IHL	14	5	9	0	777	53	0	4.09	.860	—	—	—	—	—	—	—	—
1993–94	Adirondack Red Wings	AHL	37	20	10	5	2083	102	2	2.94	.905	3	0	2	89	10	0	6.74	.818
1994–95	Adirondack Red Wings	AHL	51	19	22	8	2731	161	1	3.54	.897	4	0	4	238	14	0	3.53	.892
1995–96	Adirondack Red Wings	AHL	32	13	13	2	1654	87	0	3.16	.898	3	0	2	149	8	0	3.22	.852
1995–96	Detroit Red Wings	NHL	4	2	0	0	163	3	1	1.10	.955	—	—	—	—	—	—	—	—
1996–97	Detroit Red Wings	NHL	6	2	2	1	294	8	1	1.63	.930	—	—	—	—	—	—	—	—
1996–97	Quebec Rafales	IHL	2	1	1	0	118	7	0	3.56	.879	—	—	—	—	—	—	—	—
1997–98	Detroit Red Wings	NHL	21	9	3	3	987	44	2	2.67	.901	1	0	0	1	0	0	0.00	1.000
1998–99	Detroit Red Wings	NHL	4	0	2	0	175	9	0	3.09	.886	—	—	—	—	—	—	—	—
1998–99	Adirondack Red Wings	AHL	6	1	3	2	349	19	0	3.27	.893	—	—	—	—	—	—	—	—
1998–99	Tampa Bay Lightning	NHL	5	2	1	1	238	11	0	2.77	.907	—	—	—	—	—	—	—	—
1999–00	Tampa Bay Lightning	NHL	24	2	7	4	769	47	0	3.67	.856	—	—	—	—	—	—	—	—
1999–00	Detroit Vipers	IHL	9	2	6	0	505	22	0	2.61	.917	—	—	—	—	—	—	—	—
2002–03	Tampa Bay Lightning	NHL	7	0	3	1	283	12	0	2.54	.881	—	—	—	—	—	—	—	—
2003–04	Jokerit	FIN	3	1	1	1	184	5	1	1.63	.932	—	—	—	—	—	—	—	—
NHL totals			71	17	18	10	2910	134	4	2.76	.893	1	0	0	1	0	0	0.00	1.000
