= Ryan Risidore =

Canadian ice hockey player

- Born: April 6, 1976 (age 49) Hamilton, Ontario, Canada
- Height: 6 ft 5 in (196 cm)
- Weight: 205 lb (93 kg; 14 st 9 lb)
- Position: Defense
- Shot: Left
- Played for: Springfield Falcons; Indianapolis Ice; Hartford Wolf Pack; Hamilton Bulldogs; Tallahassee Tiger Sharks; Ayr Scottish Eagles; Columbus Cottonmouths; Aylmer Blues
- NHL draft: 109th overall, 1994; Hartford Whalers
- Playing career: 1996–2005

Ryan Risidore (born April 6, 1976) is a Canadian former professional ice hockey defenceman.

Risidore, played major junior hockey with the Guelph Storm of the Ontario Hockey League, then went on to play eight seasons in the minor leagues and one in Europe before retiring as a professional player following the 2004–05 season.

== Career statistics ==
			Regular season					Playoffs
Season	Team	League	GP	G	A	Pts	PIM	GP	G	A	Pts	PIM
1993–94	Guelph Storm	OHL	51	2	9	11	39	9	0	0	0	12
1994–95	Guelph Storm	OHL	65	2	30	32	102	14	2	2	4	19
1995–96	Guelph Storm	OHL	66	12	38	50	183	16	4	5	9	48
1996–97	Springfield Falcons	AHL	63	1	9	10	90	15	0	1	1	12
1997–98	Indianapolis Ice	IHL	75	3	8	11	123	4	0	1	1	6
1998–99	Hartford Wolf Pack	AHL	49	1	4	5	81	1	0	0	0	0
1999–00	Hamilton Bulldogs	AHL	45	3	13	16	61	10	1	0	1	17
2000–01	Tallahassee Tiger Sharks	ECHL	2	1	1	2	5	—	—	—	—	—
2000–01	Hamilton Bulldogs	AHL	48	2	12	14	51	—	—	—	—	—
2001–02	Ayr Scottish Eagles	BISL	41	4	5	9	80	7	0	2	2	8
2002–03	Columbus Cottonmouths	ECHL	62	5	15	20	139	—	—	—	—	—
2002–03	Hamilton Bulldogs	AHL	6	0	0	0	2	—	—	—	—	—
2003–04	Columbus Cottonmouths	ECHL	70	4	20	24	59	—	—	—	—	—
2004–05	Aylmer Blues	OHA-Sr.	28	5	18	23	36	—	—	—	—	—
AHL totals			211	7	38	45	285	26	1	1	2	29
