= 1997–98 NHL season =

National Hockey League season

- League: National Hockey League
- Sport: Ice hockey
- Duration: October 1, 1997 – June 16, 1998
- Games: 82
- Teams: 26
- TV partner(s): CBC, TSN, SRC (Canada); ESPN, Fox (United States)

Draft
- Top draft pick: Joe Thornton
- Picked by: Boston Bruins

Regular season
- Presidents' Trophy: Dallas Stars
- Season MVP: Dominik Hasek (Sabres)
- Top scorer: Jaromir Jagr (Penguins)

Playoffs
- Playoffs MVP: Steve Yzerman (Red Wings)

Stanley Cup
- Champions: Detroit Red Wings
- Runners-up: Washington Capitals

NHL seasons
- 1996–97 1998–99

The 1997–98 NHL season was the 81st regular season of the National Hockey League (NHL). For the first time, there was a break in the regular season to allow NHL players join their respective national hockey teams competing at the Winter Olympics. The Hartford Whalers relocated to North Carolina, becoming the Carolina Hurricanes. The Stanley Cup champions were the Detroit Red Wings, who swept the Washington Capitals in four games.

== League business ==
=== Approval of four expansion teams ===
On June 25, 1997, the National Hockey League approved of four expansion franchises for Nashville, Atlanta, Columbus, and Saint Paul expanding the league to 30 teams by 2000. These franchises became the Nashville Predators in 1998, the Atlanta Thrashers in 1999, and the Columbus Blue Jackets and Minnesota Wild in 2000.

To accommodate the incoming expansion teams, 1997–98 became the last season of the four-division quasi-geographic alignment inherited from the traditional Adams/Patrick/Norris/Smythe set. The league would change the following season to a six-division, more purely geographic alignment, with the Toronto Maple Leafs moving from the Western to Eastern Conference, among others.

=== Franchise relocation ===
The Hartford Whalers relocated to North Carolina, becoming the Carolina Hurricanes. They would remain in the Northeast Division until realignment the following season. It would be another 14 years before another NHL team would relocate.

=== Entry draft ===
The 1997 NHL entry draft was held at the Civic Arena in Pittsburgh, Pennsylvania, on June 21. Joe Thornton was selected first overall by the Boston Bruins.

=== Rule changes ===
Due to the retirement of Craig MacTavish after the 1996–97 season, all NHL players were now required to wear helmets. MacTavish was the last helmetless player remaining in the league to be grandfathered in to 1979–80 rules requiring incoming players to wear helmets.

== Arena changes ==
- The relocated Carolina Hurricanes moved from Hartford Civic Center in Hartford, Connecticut to Greensboro Coliseum in Greensboro, North Carolina, while their new arena in Raleigh, North Carolina was under construction.
- The Washington Capitals moved from US Airways Arena in Landover, Maryland to the MCI Center in Washington, D.C. on December 5, 1997, with MCI acquiring the naming rights.

== Regular season ==
=== First international regular season games ===
The Vancouver Canucks and Mighty Ducks of Anaheim opened the season with a two-game series at Yoyogi National Gymnasium in Tokyo, Japan, on October 3 and 4, 1997, the first time the NHL played regular games outside of North America.

=== Olympics and new All-Star Game format ===
This was the first time that the NHL took a break during the regular season to allow NHL players join their respective national hockey teams competing at the Winter Olympics. The league's break lasted 17 days from February 8 to 24 while NHL players participated at the men's hockey event at the 1998 Winter Olympics in Nagano, Japan.

As a preview for the NHL's first Olympic participation, a new format was introduced at the 1998 All-Star Game at General Motors Place in Vancouver, the home to the Vancouver Canucks, on January 18. The league had the all-star teams consist of a team of North Americans playing against a team of players from the rest of the world.

=== Highlights ===
The all-time record for most shutouts in a season, set at 127 just a year earlier, was broken again as 160 shutouts were recorded, 13 of which were earned by Dominik Hasek, who set a League record with 11 teams shut-out. He zeroed the New York Rangers three times, and Los Angeles, Anaheim, Tampa Bay, Boston, Calgary, Washington, Montreal, Ottawa, Pittsburgh and Edmonton once each. Only two teams, the St. Louis Blues and the Detroit Red Wings, averaged more than three goals scored per game. In addition, only one player, Jaromir Jagr, reached the 100-point plateau during the regular season.

Jari Kurri reached 600 goals in his career, finishing with 601.

For the first time since 1968–69 season, the Chicago Blackhawks missed the playoffs.

=== Final standings ===
==== Eastern Conference ====
Atlantic Division
No.	CR		GP	W	L	T	GF	GA	Pts
1	1	**New Jersey Devils**	82	48	23	11	225	166	107
2	3	**Philadelphia Flyers**	82	42	29	11	242	193	95
3	4	**Washington Capitals**	82	40	30	12	219	202	92
4	10	New York Islanders	82	30	41	11	212	225	71
5	11	New York Rangers	82	25	39	18	197	231	68
6	12	Florida Panthers	82	24	43	15	203	256	63
7	13	Tampa Bay Lightning	82	17	55	10	151	269	44

Northeast Division
No.	CR		GP	W	L	T	GF	GA	Pts
1	2	**Pittsburgh Penguins**	82	40	24	18	228	188	98
2	5	**Boston Bruins**	82	39	30	13	221	194	91
3	6	**Buffalo Sabres**	82	36	29	17	211	187	89
4	7	**Montreal Canadiens**	82	37	32	13	235	208	87
5	8	**Ottawa Senators**	82	34	33	15	193	200	83
6	9	Carolina Hurricanes	82	33	41	8	200	219	74

Eastern Conference
R		Div	GP	W	L	T	GF	GA	Pts
**1**	**New Jersey Devils**	**ATL**	**82**	**48**	**23**	**11**	**225**	**166**	**107**
**2**	**Pittsburgh Penguins**	**NE**	**82**	**40**	**24**	**18**	**228**	**188**	**98**
**3**	**Philadelphia Flyers**	**ATL**	**82**	**42**	**29**	**11**	**242**	**193**	**95**
**4**	**Washington Capitals**	**ATL**	**82**	**40**	**30**	**12**	**219**	**202**	**92**
**5**	**Boston Bruins**	**NE**	**82**	**39**	**30**	**13**	**221**	**194**	**91**
**6**	**Buffalo Sabres**	**NE**	**82**	**36**	**29**	**17**	**211**	**187**	**89**
**7**	**Montreal Canadiens**	**NE**	**82**	**37**	**32**	**13**	**235**	**208**	**87**
**8**	**Ottawa Senators**	**NE**	**82**	**34**	**33**	**15**	**193**	**200**	**83**
9	Carolina Hurricanes	NE	82	33	41	8	200	219	74
10	New York Islanders	ATL	82	30	41	11	212	225	71
11	New York Rangers	ATL	82	25	39	18	197	231	68
12	Florida Panthers	ATL	82	24	43	15	203	256	63
13	Tampa Bay Lightning	ATL	82	17	55	10	151	269	44

Divisions: ATL – Atlantic, NE – Northeast

bold – Qualified for playoffs

==== Western Conference ====
Central Division
No.	CR		GP	W	L	T	GF	GA	Pts
1	1	**Dallas Stars**	82	49	22	11	242	167	109
2	3	**Detroit Red Wings**	82	44	23	15	250	196	103
3	4	**St. Louis Blues**	82	45	29	8	256	204	98
4	6	**Phoenix Coyotes**	82	35	35	12	224	227	82
5	9	Chicago Blackhawks	82	30	39	13	192	199	73
6	10	Toronto Maple Leafs	82	30	43	9	194	237	69

Pacific Division
No.	CR		GP	W	L	T	GF	GA	Pts
1	2	**Colorado Avalanche**	82	39	26	17	231	205	95
2	5	**Los Angeles Kings**	82	38	33	11	227	225	87
3	7	**Edmonton Oilers**	82	35	37	10	215	224	80
4	8	**San Jose Sharks**	82	34	38	10	210	216	78
5	11	Calgary Flames	82	26	41	15	217	252	67
6	12	Mighty Ducks of Anaheim	82	26	43	13	205	261	65
7	13	Vancouver Canucks	82	25	43	14	224	273	64

Western Conference
R		Div	GP	W	L	T	GF	GA	Pts
**1**	**p – Dallas Stars**	**CEN**	**82**	**49**	**22**	**11**	**242**	**167**	**109**
**2**	**x – Colorado Avalanche**	**PAC**	**82**	**39**	**26**	**17**	**231**	**205**	**95**
**3**	**Detroit Red Wings**	**CEN**	**82**	**44**	**23**	**15**	**250**	**196**	**103**
**4**	**St. Louis Blues**	**CEN**	**82**	**45**	**29**	**8**	**256**	**204**	**98**
**5**	**Los Angeles Kings**	**PAC**	**82**	**38**	**33**	**11**	**227**	**225**	**87**
**6**	**Phoenix Coyotes**	**CEN**	**82**	**35**	**35**	**12**	**224**	**227**	**82**
**7**	**Edmonton Oilers**	**PAC**	**82**	**35**	**37**	**10**	**215**	**224**	**80**
**8**	**San Jose Sharks**	**PAC**	**82**	**34**	**38**	**10**	**210**	**216**	**78**
9	Chicago Blackhawks	CEN	82	30	39	13	192	199	73
10	Toronto Maple Leafs	CEN	82	30	43	9	194	237	69
11	Calgary Flames	PAC	82	26	41	15	217	252	67
12	Mighty Ducks of Anaheim	PAC	82	26	43	13	205	261	65
13	Vancouver Canucks	PAC	82	25	43	14	224	273	64

Divisions: CEN – Central, PAC – Pacific

bold – Qualified for playoffs; x – Won Division; p – Won Presidents' Trophy

== Playoffs ==
=== Bracket ===
The top eight teams in each conference made the playoffs, with the two division winners seeded 1–2 based on regular season records, and the six remaining teams seeded 3–8. In each round, teams competed in a best-of-seven series (scores in the bracket indicate the number of games won in each best-of-seven series). The NHL used "re-seeding" instead of a fixed bracket playoff system. During the first three rounds, the highest remaining seed in each conference was matched against the lowest remaining seed, the second-highest remaining seed played the second-lowest remaining seed, and so forth. The higher-seeded team was awarded home-ice advantage. The two conference winners then advanced to the Stanley Cup Finals.

Conference quarterfinals	Conference semifinals
1	New Jersey	2
8	Ottawa	4
4	Washington	4
8	Ottawa	1
2	Pittsburgh	2
7	Montreal	4
Eastern Conference
3	Philadelphia	1
6	Buffalo	4
6	Buffalo	4
7	Montreal	0
4	Washington	4
5	Boston	2
1	Dallas	4
8	San Jose	2
1	Dallas	4
7	Edmonton	1
2	Colorado	3
7	Edmonton	4
Western Conference
3	Detroit	4
6	Phoenix	2
3	Detroit	4
4	St. Louis	2
4	St. Louis	4
5	Los Angeles	0

Conference finals
4	Washington	4
6	Buffalo	2
1	Dallas	2
3	Detroit	4

Stanley Cup Finals
E4	Washington	0
W3	Detroit	4

== Awards ==
The NHL Awards took place in Toronto, Ontario

Presidents' Trophy:	Dallas Stars
Prince of Wales Trophy: (Eastern Conference playoff champion)	Washington Capitals
Clarence S. Campbell Bowl: (Western Conference playoff champion)	Detroit Red Wings
Art Ross Trophy:	Jaromir Jagr, Pittsburgh Penguins
Bill Masterton Memorial Trophy:	Jamie McLennan, St. Louis Blues
Calder Memorial Trophy:	Sergei Samsonov, Boston Bruins
Frank J. Selke Trophy:	Jere Lehtinen, Dallas Stars
Hart Memorial Trophy:	Dominik Hasek, Buffalo Sabres
Conn Smythe Trophy:	Steve Yzerman, Detroit Red Wings
Jack Adams Award:	Pat Burns, Boston Bruins
James Norris Memorial Trophy:	Rob Blake, Los Angeles Kings
King Clancy Memorial Trophy:	Kelly Chase, St. Louis Blues
Lady Byng Memorial Trophy:	Ron Francis, Pittsburgh Penguins
Lester B. Pearson Award:	Dominik Hasek, Buffalo Sabres
NHL Foundation Player Award:	Kelly Chase, St. Louis Blues
NHL Plus-Minus Award:	Chris Pronger, St. Louis Blues
Vezina Trophy:	Dominik Hasek, Buffalo Sabres
William M. Jennings Trophy:	Martin Brodeur, New Jersey Devils

=== All-Star teams ===
First Team	Position	Second Team
Dominik Hasek, Buffalo Sabres	G	Martin Brodeur, New Jersey Devils
Nicklas Lidstrom, Detroit Red Wings	D	Chris Pronger, St. Louis Blues
Rob Blake, Los Angeles Kings	D	Scott Niedermayer, New Jersey Devils
Peter Forsberg, Colorado Avalanche	C	Wayne Gretzky, New York Rangers
Jaromir Jagr, Pittsburgh Penguins	RW	Teemu Selanne, Mighty Ducks of Anaheim
John LeClair, Philadelphia Flyers	LW	Keith Tkachuk, Phoenix Coyotes

== Player statistics ==
=== Scoring leaders ===
Regular season

Player	Team	GP	G	A	PTS
Jaromir Jagr	Pittsburgh	77	35	67	102
Peter Forsberg	Colorado	72	25	66	91
Pavel Bure	Vancouver	82	51	39	90
Wayne Gretzky	NY Rangers	82	23	67	90
John LeClair	Philadelphia	82	51	36	87
Zigmund Palffy	NY Islanders	82	45	42	87
Ron Francis	Pittsburgh	81	25	62	87
Teemu Selanne	Anaheim	73	52	34	86
Jason Allison	Boston	81	33	50	83
Jozef Stumpel	Los Angeles	77	21	58	79
Peter Bondra	Washington	76	52	26	78

Source: NHL.

Playoffs

Player	Team	GP	G	A	Pts
Steve Yzerman	Detroit	22	6	18	24
Sergei Fedorov	Detroit	22	10	10	20
Tomas Holmstrom	Detroit	22	7	12	19
Nicklas Lidstrom	Detroit	22	6	13	19
Joe Juneau	Washington	21	7	10	17
Adam Oates	Washington	21	6	11	17
Martin Lapointe	Detroit	21	9	6	15
Larry Murphy	Detroit	22	3	12	15
Vyacheslav Kozlov	Detroit	22	6	8	14
Mike Modano	Dallas	17	4	10	14

Note: GP = Games Played, G = Goals, A = Assists, Pts = Points

=== Leading goaltenders ===
Regular season

Player	Team	GP	MIN	GA	SO	GAA	SV%
Ed Belfour	Dallas	65	3581	112	9	1.88	.916
Martin Brodeur	New Jersey	70	4128	130	10	1.89	.917
Tom Barrasso	Pittsburgh	63	3542	122	7	2.07	.922
Dominik Hasek	Buffalo	72	4220	147	13	2.09	.932
Ron Hextall	Philadelphia	46	2688	97	4	2.17	.911
Trevor Kidd	Carolina	47	2685	97	3	2.17	.922
Jamie McLennan	St. Louis	30	1658	60	2	2.17	.903
Jeff Hackett	Chicago	58	3441	126	8	2.20	.917
Olaf Kolzig	Washington	64	3788	139	5	2.20	.920
Chris Osgood	Detroit	64	3807	140	6	2.21	.913

== Coaches ==
=== Eastern Conference ===
- Boston Bruins: Pat Burns
- Buffalo Sabres: Lindy Ruff
- Carolina Hurricanes: Paul Maurice
- Florida Panthers: Doug MacLean and Bryan Murray
- Montreal Canadiens: Alain Vigneault
- New Jersey Devils: Jacques Lemaire
- New York Islanders: Rick Bowness and Mike Milbury
- New York Rangers: Colin Campbell and John Muckler
- Ottawa Senators: Jacques Martin
- Philadelphia Flyers: Wayne Cashman and Roger Neilson
- Pittsburgh Penguins: Kevin Constantine
- Tampa Bay Lightning: Terry Crisp, Rick Paterson and Jacques Demers
- Washington Capitals: Ron Wilson

=== Western Conference ===
- Mighty Ducks of Anaheim: Pierre Page
- Calgary Flames: Brian Sutter
- Chicago Blackhawks: Craig Hartsburg
- Colorado Avalanche: Marc Crawford
- Dallas Stars: Ken Hitchcock
- Detroit Red Wings: Scotty Bowman
- Edmonton Oilers: Ron Low
- Los Angeles Kings: Larry Robinson
- Phoenix Coyotes: Jim Schoenfeld
- San Jose Sharks: Darryl Sutter
- St. Louis Blues: Joel Quenneville
- Toronto Maple Leafs: Mike Murphy
- Vancouver Canucks: Tom Renney and Mike Keenan

== Milestones ==
=== Debuts ===
The following is a list of players of note who played their first NHL game in 1997–98 (listed with their first team, asterisk(*) marks debut in playoffs):

- Matt Cullen, Mighty Ducks of Anaheim
- Joe Thornton, Boston Bruins
- Sergei Samsonov, Boston Bruins
- Derek Morris, Calgary Flames
- Olli Jokinen, Los Angeles Kings
- Sheldon Souray, New Jersey Devils
- Zdeno Chara, New York Islanders
- Marc Savard, New York Rangers
- Chris Phillips, Ottawa Senators
- Marian Hossa, Ottawa Senators
- Daniel Briere, Phoenix Coyotes
- Patrick Marleau, San Jose Sharks
- Mattias Ohlund, Vancouver Canucks

=== Last games ===
The following is a list of players of note who played their last game in the NHL in 1997–98 (listed with their last team):

- Brent Sutter, Chicago Blackhawks
- Jari Kurri, Colorado Avalanche
- Slava Fetisov, Detroit Red Wings
- Kevin Lowe, Edmonton Oilers
- Andy Moog, Montreal Canadiens
- Pat LaFontaine, New York Rangers
- Joel Otto, Philadelphia Flyers
- Mike Gartner, Phoenix Coyotes
- Al Iafrate, San Jose Sharks
- Kelly Hrudey, San Jose Sharks
- Jeff Brown, Washington Capitals
- Brian Bradley, Tampa Bay Lightning
- Norm Maciver, Phoenix Coyotes

== Broadcasting ==
=== Canada ===
This was the tenth and final season that the league's Canadian national broadcast rights were split between TSN and Hockey Night in Canada on CBC. During the regular season, Saturday night games aired on CBC, while TSN primarily had Monday and Thursday night games. Coverage of the Stanley Cup playoffs was primarily on CBC, with TSN airing first round all-U.S. series.

The league then signed a new deal with the fledgling CTV Sportsnet, replacing TSN as the national cable television partner.

=== United States ===
This was the fourth season of the league's five-year U.S. national broadcast rights deals with Fox and ESPN. Both ESPN and ESPN2 aired weeknight games throughout the regular season. Fox had the All-Star Game, and the network's weekly regional telecasts then expanded from six to 11 weekend afternoons between January and April. During the first two rounds of the playoffs, ESPN and ESPN2 aired selected games, while Fox had Sunday regional telecasts. Each U.S. team's regional broadcaster produced local coverage of first and second round games (except for those games on Fox). Fox's Sunday telecasts continued into the Conference Finals, while ESPN had the rest of the third round games. The Stanley Cup Finals were also split between Fox and ESPN.

The controversial "FoxTrax" puck system was last used this season. In August 1998, the NHL signed a five-year, $600 million rights agreement with ABC Sports/ESPN, and thus Fox elected not to use the system in the subsequent "lame duck" season.

== See also ==
- List of Stanley Cup champions
- 1997 NHL entry draft
- 1997–98 NHL transactions
- 48th National Hockey League All-Star Game
- National Hockey League All-Star Game
- NHL All-Rookie Team
- Lester Patrick Trophy
- Ice hockey at the 1998 Winter Olympics
- 1997 in sports
- 1998 in sports
