= 1997–98 Colorado Avalanche season =

National Hockey League team season

1997–98 Colorado Avalanche
- Pacific Division champions
- Division: 1st Pacific
- Conference: 2nd Western
- 1997–98 record: 39–26–17
- Home record: 21–10–10
- Road record: 18–16–7
- Goals for: 231
- Goals against: 205

Team information
- General manager: Pierre Lacroix
- Coach: Marc Crawford
- Captain: Joe Sakic
- Alternate captains: Claude Lemieux; Adam Foote
- Arena: McNichols Sports Arena
- Average attendance: 16,061
- Minor league affiliate: Hershey Bears

Team leaders
- Goals: Joe Sakic (27)
- Assists: Peter Forsberg (66)
- Points: Peter Forsberg (91)
- Penalty minutes: Jeff Odgers (213)
- Plus/minus: Uwe Krupp (+21)
- Wins: Patrick Roy (31)
- Goals against average: Craig Billington (2.32)

The 1997–98 Colorado Avalanche season was the Avalanche's third season.

== Regular season ==
=== Season standings ===
Pacific Division
No.	CR		GP	W	L	T	GF	GA	Pts
1	2	**Colorado Avalanche**	82	39	26	17	231	205	95
2	5	**Los Angeles Kings**	82	38	33	11	227	225	87
3	7	**Edmonton Oilers**	82	35	37	10	215	224	80
4	8	**San Jose Sharks**	82	34	38	10	210	216	78
5	11	Calgary Flames	82	26	41	15	217	252	67
6	12	Mighty Ducks of Anaheim	82	26	43	13	205	261	65
7	13	Vancouver Canucks	82	25	43	14	224	273	64

Note: CR = Conference rank; GP = Games played; W = Wins; L = Losses; T = Ties; GF = Goals for; GA = Goals against; Pts = Points
Bolded teams qualified for the playoffs.

Western Conference
R		Div	GP	W	L	T	GF	GA	Pts
**1**	**p – Dallas Stars**	**CEN**	**82**	**49**	**22**	**11**	**242**	**167**	**109**
**2**	**x – Colorado Avalanche**	**PAC**	**82**	**39**	**26**	**17**	**231**	**205**	**95**
**3**	**Detroit Red Wings**	**CEN**	**82**	**44**	**23**	**15**	**250**	**196**	**103**
**4**	**St. Louis Blues**	**CEN**	**82**	**45**	**29**	**8**	**256**	**204**	**98**
**5**	**Los Angeles Kings**	**PAC**	**82**	**38**	**33**	**11**	**227**	**225**	**87**
**6**	**Phoenix Coyotes**	**CEN**	**82**	**35**	**35**	**12**	**224**	**227**	**82**
**7**	**Edmonton Oilers**	**PAC**	**82**	**35**	**37**	**10**	**215**	**224**	**80**
**8**	**San Jose Sharks**	**PAC**	**82**	**34**	**38**	**10**	**210**	**216**	**78**
9	Chicago Blackhawks	CEN	82	30	39	13	192	199	73
10	Toronto Maple Leafs	CEN	82	30	43	9	194	237	69
11	Calgary Flames	PAC	82	26	41	15	217	252	67
12	Mighty Ducks of Anaheim	PAC	82	26	43	13	205	261	65
13	Vancouver Canucks	PAC	82	25	43	14	224	273	64

Divisions: CEN – Central, PAC – Pacific

bold – Qualified for playoffs; x – Won Division; p – Won Presidents' Trophy

== Schedule and results ==
=== Regular season ===
1997–98 regular season
October: 7–2–5 (home: 4–0–3; road: 3–2–2)

Game	Date	Score	Opponent	Record	Recap
1	October 1, 1997	2–2 OT	Dallas Stars (1997–98)	0–0–1	T
2	October 3, 1997	4–1	@ Calgary Flames (1997–98)	1–0–1	W
3	October 5, 1997	3–0	@ Edmonton Oilers (1997–98)	2–0–1	W
4	October 7, 1997	3–2	Boston Bruins (1997–98)	3–0–1	W
5	October 9, 1997	3–2	San Jose Sharks (1997–98)	4–0–1	W
6	October 11, 1997	3–3 OT	Phoenix Coyotes (1997–98)	4–0–2	T
7	October 15, 1997	6–2	@ Edmonton Oilers (1997–98)	5–0–2	W
8	October 17, 1997	5–6 OT	@ Calgary Flames (1997–98)	5–1–2	L
9	October 19, 1997	4–4 OT	@ Vancouver Canucks (1997–98)	5–1–3	T
10	October 22, 1997	4–3	Washington Capitals (1997–98)	6–1–3	W
11	October 24, 1997	3–3 OT	Carolina Hurricanes (1997–98)	6–1–4	T
12	October 25, 1997	1–3	@ Dallas Stars (1997–98)	6–2–4	L
13	October 28, 1997	3–2	Buffalo Sabres (1997–98)	7–2–4	W
14	October 30, 1997	2–2 OT	@ St. Louis Blues (1997–98)	7–2–5	T

November: 6–4–3 (home: 2–2–1; road: 4–2–2)

Game	Date	Score	Opponent	Record	Recap
15	November 1, 1997	3–3 OT	Calgary Flames (1997–98)	7–2–6	T
16	November 5, 1997	2–4	New York Rangers (1997–98)	7–3–6	L
17	November 8, 1997	4–1	St. Louis Blues (1997–98)	8–3–6	W
18	November 11, 1997	2–0	@ Detroit Red Wings (1997–98)	9–3–6	W
19	November 13, 1997	2–1	@ Philadelphia Flyers (1997–98)	10–3–6	W
20	November 14, 1997	1–4	@ New Jersey Devils (1997–98)	10–4–6	L
21	November 16, 1997	1–4	@ New York Rangers (1997–98)	10–5–6	L
22	November 18, 1997	6–6 OT	@ Washington Capitals (1997–98)	10–5–7	T
23	November 21, 1997	3–1	Toronto Maple Leafs (1997–98)	11–5–7	W
24	November 23, 1997	1–2 OT	Los Angeles Kings (1997–98)	11–6–7	L
25	November 26, 1997	3–3 OT	@ Tampa Bay Lightning (1997–98)	11–6–8	T
26	November 28, 1997	3–2	@ Florida Panthers (1997–98)	12–6–8	W
27	November 29, 1997	3–2	@ Carolina Hurricanes (1997–98)	13–6–8	W

December: 8–2–4 (home: 5–0–3; road: 3–2–1)

Game	Date	Score	Opponent	Record	Recap
28	December 2, 1997	4–2	Edmonton Oilers (1997–98)	14–6–8	W
29	December 4, 1997	2–1	@ Chicago Blackhawks (1997–98)	15–6–8	W
30	December 6, 1997	6–4	Vancouver Canucks (1997–98)	16–6–8	W
31	December 8, 1997	2–4	@ Montreal Canadiens (1997–98)	16–7–8	L
32	December 10, 1997	2–2 OT	@ Toronto Maple Leafs (1997–98)	16–7–9	T
33	December 12, 1997	1–3	@ Calgary Flames (1997–98)	16–8–9	L
34	December 13, 1997	5–2	@ Vancouver Canucks (1997–98)	17–8–9	W
35	December 15, 1997	3–2	Toronto Maple Leafs (1997–98)	18–8–9	W
36	December 17, 1997	2–2 OT	Detroit Red Wings (1997–98)	18–8–10	T
37	December 19, 1997	3–3 OT	Pittsburgh Penguins (1997–98)	18–8–11	T
38	December 23, 1997	5–1	Los Angeles Kings (1997–98)	19–8–11	W
39	December 27, 1997	5–1	@ Edmonton Oilers (1997–98)	20–8–11	W
40	December 29, 1997	1–1 OT	Montreal Canadiens (1997–98)	20–8–12	T
41	December 31, 1997	3–1	New York Islanders (1997–98)	21–8–12	W

January: 5–5–4 (home: 3–3–3; road: 2–2–1)

Game	Date	Score	Opponent	Record	Recap
42	January 2, 1998	2–2 OT	@ Buffalo Sabres (1997–98)	21–8–13	T
43	January 3, 1998	5–4 OT	@ Pittsburgh Penguins (1997–98)	22–8–13	W
44	January 6, 1998	1–3	Calgary Flames (1997–98)	22–9–13	L
45	January 8, 1998	4–4 OT	Vancouver Canucks (1997–98)	22–9–14	T
46	January 10, 1998	3–3 OT	Ottawa Senators (1997–98)	22–9–15	T
47	January 12, 1998	3–1	Florida Panthers (1997–98)	23–9–15	W
48	January 14, 1998	2–0	@ Mighty Ducks of Anaheim (1997–98)	24–9–15	W
49	January 15, 1998	2–2 OT	San Jose Sharks (1997–98)	24–9–16	T
50	January 21, 1998	2–3	@ Dallas Stars (1997–98)	24–10–16	L
51	January 22, 1998	3–4	Mighty Ducks of Anaheim (1997–98)	24–11–16	L
52	January 24, 1998	2–3	Dallas Stars (1997–98)	24–12–16	L
53	January 26, 1998	2–1 OT	Edmonton Oilers (1997–98)	25–12–16	W
54	January 28, 1998	6–1	Vancouver Canucks (1997–98)	26–12–16	W
55	January 31, 1998	2–5	@ San Jose Sharks (1997–98)	26–13–16	L

February: 5–1–0 (home: 3–1–0; road: 2–0–0)

Game	Date	Score	Opponent	Record	Recap
56	February 2, 1998	2–1	@ Vancouver Canucks (1997–98)	27–13–16	W
57	February 5, 1998	4–2	Chicago Blackhawks (1997–98)	28–13–16	W
58	February 7, 1998	3–2	Philadelphia Flyers (1997–98)	29–13–16	W
59	February 25, 1998	4–2	@ Phoenix Coyotes (1997–98)	30–13–16	W
60	February 26, 1998	3–0	Phoenix Coyotes (1997–98)	31–13–16	W
61	February 28, 1998	0–4	Chicago Blackhawks (1997–98)	31–14–16	L

March: 6–7–0 (home: 2–3–0; road: 4–4–0)

Game	Date	Score	Opponent	Record	Recap
62	March 2, 1998	4–5 OT	Edmonton Oilers (1997–98)	31–15–16	L
63	March 4, 1998	5–3	@ Toronto Maple Leafs (1997–98)	32–15–16	W
64	March 5, 1998	2–4	@ Ottawa Senators (1997–98)	32–16–16	L
65	March 7, 1998	4–2	@ New York Islanders (1997–98)	33–16–16	W
66	March 9, 1998	1–2	Tampa Bay Lightning (1997–98)	33–17–16	L
67	March 11, 1998	3–2	St. Louis Blues (1997–98)	34–17–16	W
68	March 14, 1998	2–5	@ Los Angeles Kings (1997–98)	34–18–16	L
69	March 15, 1998	3–5	@ Mighty Ducks of Anaheim (1997–98)	34–19–16	L
70	March 19, 1998	4–3	@ Phoenix Coyotes (1997–98)	35–19–16	W
71	March 21, 1998	2–0	@ San Jose Sharks (1997–98)	36–19–16	W
72	March 26, 1998	0–2	New Jersey Devils (1997–98)	36–20–16	L
73	March 28, 1998	5–3	Mighty Ducks of Anaheim (1997–98)	37–20–16	W
74	March 30, 1998	1–4	@ Boston Bruins (1997–98)	37–21–16	L

April: 2–5–1 (home: 2–1–0; road: 0–4–1)

Game	Date	Score	Opponent	Record	Recap
75	April 1, 1998	0–2	@ Detroit Red Wings (1997–98)	37–22–16	L
76	April 2, 1998	1–2	@ Chicago Blackhawks (1997–98)	37–23–16	L
77	April 4, 1998	1–4	@ St. Louis Blues (1997–98)	37–24–16	L
78	April 6, 1998	1–3	Los Angeles Kings (1997–98)	37–25–16	L
79	April 11, 1998	3–4	@ Los Angeles Kings (1997–98)	37–26–16	L
80	April 13, 1998	2–2 OT	@ Mighty Ducks of Anaheim (1997–98)	37–26–17	T
81	April 16, 1998	4–1	San Jose Sharks (1997–98)	38–26–17	W
82	April 18, 1998	4–3	Detroit Red Wings (1997–98)	39–26–17	W

Legend: W Win (2 points) L Loss (0 points) T Tie (1 point)

=== Playoffs ===
1998 Stanley Cup playoffs
Western Conference Quarterfinals vs. (7) Edmonton Oilers – Oilers win 4–3

Game	Date	Score	Opponent	Series	Recap
1	April 22, 1998	2–3	Edmonton Oilers	Oilers lead 1–0	L
2	April 24, 1998	5–2	Edmonton Oilers	Series tied 1–1	W
3	April 26, 1998	5–4 OT	@ Edmonton Oilers	Avalanche lead 2–1	W
4	April 28, 1998	3–1	@ Edmonton Oilers	Avalanche lead 3–1	W
5	April 30, 1998	1–3	Edmonton Oilers	Avalanche lead 3–2	L
6	May 2, 1998	0–2	@ Edmonton Oilers	Series tied 3–3	L
7	May 4, 1998	0–4	Edmonton Oilers	Oilers win 4–3	L

Legend: W Win L Loss

== Player statistics ==
=== Scoring ===
- Position abbreviations: C = Center; D = Defense; G = Goaltender; LW = Left wing; RW = Right wing
- † = Joined team via a transaction (e.g., trade, waivers, signing) during the season. Stats reflect time with the Avalanche only.
- ‡ = Left team via a transaction (e.g., trade, waivers, release) during the season. Stats reflect time with the Avalanche only.

No.	Player	Pos	Regular season						Playoffs					
No.	Player	Pos	GP	G	A	Pts	+/-	PIM	GP	G	A	Pts	+/-	PIM
21	Peter Forsberg	C	72	25	66	91	6	94	7	6	5	11	3	12
13	Valeri Kamensky	LW	75	26	40	66	−2	60	7	2	3	5	1	18
19	Joe Sakic	C	64	27	36	63	0	50	6	2	3	5	0	6
22	Claude Lemieux	RW	78	26	27	53	−7	115	7	3	3	6	2	8
8	Sandis Ozolinsh	D	66	13	38	51	−12	65	7	0	7	7	−3	14
18	Adam Deadmarsh	RW	73	22	21	43	0	125	7	2	0	2	−1	4
28	Eric Lacroix	LW	82	16	15	31	0	84	7	0	0	0	−2	6
4	Uwe Krupp	D	78	9	22	31	21	38	7	0	1	1	2	4
20	Rene Corbet	LW	68	16	12	28	8	133	2	0	0	0	0	2
26	Stephane Yelle	C	81	7	15	22	−10	48	7	1	0	1	−3	12
17	Jari Kurri	RW	70	5	17	22	6	12	4	0	0	0	−1	0
52	Adam Foote	D	77	3	14	17	−3	124	7	0	0	0	−1	23
29	Eric Messier	LW	62	4	12	16	4	20	—	—	—	—	—	—
24	Jon Klemm	D	67	6	8	14	−3	30	4	0	0	0	1	0
5	Alexei Gusarov	D	72	4	10	14	9	42	7	0	1	1	1	6
16	Jeff Odgers†	RW	68	5	8	13	5	213	6	0	0	0	−1	25
12	Shean Donovan†	RW	47	5	7	12	3	48	—	—	—	—	—	—
11	Keith Jones	RW	23	3	7	10	−4	22	7	0	0	0	−1	13
2	Sylvain Lefebvre	D	81	0	10	10	2	48	7	0	0	0	−1	4
10	Josef Marha‡	C	11	2	5	7	0	4	—	—	—	—	—	—
3	Aaron Miller	D	55	2	2	4	0	51	7	0	0	0	0	8
9	Mike Ricci‡	C	6	0	4	4	0	2	—	—	—	—	—	—
14	Tom Fitzgerald†	RW	11	2	1	3	0	22	7	0	1	1	−2	20
27	Francois Leroux	D	50	1	2	3	−3	140	—	—	—	—	—	—
33	Patrick Roy	G	65	0	3	3		39	7	0	1	1		0
6	Wade Belak	D	8	1	1	2	−3	27	—	—	—	—	—	—
15	Yves Sarault	LW	2	1	0	1	1	0	—	—	—	—	—	—
7	Pascal Trepanier	D	15	0	1	1	−2	18	—	—	—	—	—	—
1	Craig Billington	G	23	0	0	0		2	1	0	0	0		0
40	Brad Larsen	LW	1	0	0	0	0	0	—	—	—	—	—	—
14	Christian Matte	RW	5	0	0	0	0	6	—	—	—	—	—	—
10	Warren Rychel†	LW	8	0	0	0	−1	23	6	0	0	0	−2	24

=== Goaltending ===
No.	Player	Regular season										Playoffs								
No.	Player	GP	W	L	T	SA	GA	GAA	SV%	SO	TOI	GP	W	L	SA	GA	GAA	SV%	SO	TOI
33	Patrick Roy	65	31	19	13	1825	153	2.39	.916	4	3835	7	3	4	191	18	2.51	.906	0	430
1	Craig Billington	23	8	7	4	588	45	2.32	.923	1	1162	1	0	0	0	0	0.00		0	1

== Awards and records ==
=== Awards ===
Type	Award/honor	Recipient	Ref
League (annual)	NHL First All-Star Team	Peter Forsberg (Center)	
League (in-season)	NHL All-Star Game selection	Peter Forsberg (Note: Forsberg, Ozolinsh, and Roy were voted to the starting lineup.)	
League (in-season)	NHL All-Star Game selection	Valeri Kamensky	
League (in-season)	NHL All-Star Game selection	Jari Kurri (Note: Commissioner’s selection.)	
League (in-season)	NHL All-Star Game selection	Sandis Ozolinsh	
League (in-season)	NHL All-Star Game selection	Patrick Roy	
League (in-season)	NHL All-Star Game selection	Joe Sakic	
League (in-season)	NHL Rookie of the Month	Eric Messier (October)	

=== Milestones ===
Milestone	Player	Date	Ref
First game	Pascal Trepanier	October 1, 1997	
First game	Brad Larsen	March 21, 1998	

== Draft picks ==
Colorado's draft picks at the 1997 NHL entry draft held at the Civic Arena in Pittsburgh, Pennsylvania.

Round	#	Player	Nationality	College/Junior/Club team (League)
1	26	Kevin Grimes	Canada	Kingston Frontenacs (OHL)
2	53	Graham Belak	Canada	Edmonton Ice (WHL)
3	55	Rick Berry	Canada	Seattle Thunderbirds (WHL)
3	78	Ville Nieminen	Finland	Tappara (Finland)
4	87	Brad Larsen	Canada	Swift Current Broncos (WHL)
5	133	Aaron Miskovich	United States	Green Bay Gamblers (USHL)
6	161	David Aebischer	Switzerland	HC Fribourg-Gotteron (Switzerland)
8	217	Doug Schmidt	United States	Waterloo Black Hawks (USHL)
9	243	Kyle Kidney	United States	Salisbury School (USHS-CT)
9	245	Steve Lafleur	Canada	Belleville Bulls (OHL)

== See also ==
- 1997–98 NHL season
