= 1997–98 Boston Bruins season =

NHL team season

1997–98 Boston Bruins
- Division: 2nd Northeast
- Conference: 5th Eastern
- 1997–98 record: 39–30–13
- Home record: 19–16–6
- Road record: 20–14–7
- Goals for: 221
- Goals against: 194

Team information
- General manager: Mike O'Connell
- Coach: Pat Burns
- Captain: Ray Bourque
- Alternate captains: Ken Baumgartner; Don Sweeney
- Arena: Fleet Center
- Average attendance: 15,097
- Minor league affiliates: Providence Bruins; Charlotte Checkers

Team leaders
- Goals: Jason Allison (33)
- Assists: Jason Allison (50)
- Points: Jason Allison (83)
- Penalty minutes: Ken Baumgartner (199)
- Plus/minus: Jason Allison (+33)
- Wins: Byron Dafoe (30)
- Goals against average: Rob Tallas (1.83)

The 1997–98 Boston Bruins season was the team's 74th season. The season involved drafting Joe Thornton first overall.

== Regular season ==
The Bruins allowed the fewest shorthanded goals (3) and were the most disciplined team during the regular season, being short-handed only 285 times.

=== Final standings ===
Northeast Division
No.	CR		GP	W	L	T	GF	GA	Pts
1	2	**Pittsburgh Penguins**	82	40	24	18	228	188	98
2	5	**Boston Bruins**	82	39	30	13	221	194	91
3	6	**Buffalo Sabres**	82	36	29	17	211	187	89
4	7	**Montreal Canadiens**	82	37	32	13	235	208	87
5	8	**Ottawa Senators**	82	34	33	15	193	200	83
6	9	Carolina Hurricanes	82	33	41	8	200	219	74

Eastern Conference
R		Div	GP	W	L	T	GF	GA	Pts
**1**	**New Jersey Devils**	**ATL**	**82**	**48**	**23**	**11**	**225**	**166**	**107**
**2**	**Pittsburgh Penguins**	**NE**	**82**	**40**	**24**	**18**	**228**	**188**	**98**
**3**	**Philadelphia Flyers**	**ATL**	**82**	**42**	**29**	**11**	**242**	**193**	**95**
**4**	**Washington Capitals**	**ATL**	**82**	**40**	**30**	**12**	**219**	**202**	**92**
**5**	**Boston Bruins**	**NE**	**82**	**39**	**30**	**13**	**221**	**194**	**91**
**6**	**Buffalo Sabres**	**NE**	**82**	**36**	**29**	**17**	**211**	**187**	**89**
**7**	**Montreal Canadiens**	**NE**	**82**	**37**	**32**	**13**	**235**	**208**	**87**
**8**	**Ottawa Senators**	**NE**	**82**	**34**	**33**	**15**	**193**	**200**	**83**
9	Carolina Hurricanes	NE	82	33	41	8	200	219	74
10	New York Islanders	ATL	82	30	41	11	212	225	71
11	New York Rangers	ATL	82	25	39	18	197	231	68
12	Florida Panthers	ATL	82	24	43	15	203	256	63
13	Tampa Bay Lightning	ATL	82	17	55	10	151	269	44

Divisions: ATL – Atlantic, NE – Northeast

bold – Qualified for playoffs

== Schedule and results ==
=== Regular season ===
1997–98 regular season
October: 7–5–1 (home: 1–3–1; road: 6–2–0)

Game	Date	Score	Opponent	Record	Recap
1	October 2, 1997	6–5	Los Angeles Kings (1997–98)	1–0–0	W
2	October 4, 1997	1–4	Montreal Canadiens (1997–98)	1–1–0	L
3	October 7, 1997	2–3	@ Colorado Avalanche (1997–98)	1–2–0	L
4	October 8, 1997	3–2 OT	@ Phoenix Coyotes (1997–98)	2–2–0	W
5	October 11, 1997	2–5	@ San Jose Sharks (1997–98)	2–3–0	L
6	October 13, 1997	3–0	@ Mighty Ducks of Anaheim (1997–98)	3–3–0	W
7	October 15, 1997	5–3	@ Los Angeles Kings (1997–98)	4–3–0	W
8	October 17, 1997	2–0	@ Vancouver Canucks (1997–98)	5–3–0	W
9	October 18, 1997	3–0	@ Calgary Flames (1997–98)	6–3–0	W
10	October 21, 1997	2–1	@ Edmonton Oilers (1997–98)	7–3–0	W
11	October 23, 1997	2–2 OT	Tampa Bay Lightning (1997–98)	7–3–1	T
12	October 25, 1997	4–5	Florida Panthers (1997–98)	7–4–1	L
13	October 30, 1997	0–3	Mighty Ducks of Anaheim (1997–98)	7–5–1	L

November: 4–6–4 (home: 2–3–2; road: 2–3–2)

Game	Date	Score	Opponent	Record	Recap
14	November 1, 1997	3–1	Edmonton Oilers (1997–98)	8–5–1	W
15	November 2, 1997	3–1	@ Ottawa Senators (1997–98)	9–5–1	W
16	November 6, 1997	2–0	Washington Capitals (1997–98)	10–5–1	W
17	November 8, 1997	0–2	@ New Jersey Devils (1997–98)	10–6–1	L
18	November 12, 1997	3–3 OT	@ Dallas Stars (1997–98)	10–6–2	T
19	November 13, 1997	2–4	@ St. Louis Blues (1997–98)	10–7–2	L
20	November 15, 1997	3–3 OT	Ottawa Senators (1997–98)	10–7–3	T
21	November 17, 1997	4–2	@ Ottawa Senators (1997–98)	11–7–3	W
22	November 19, 1997	3–3 OT	@ Pittsburgh Penguins (1997–98)	11–7–4	T
23	November 20, 1997	0–5	Buffalo Sabres (1997–98)	11–8–4	L
24	November 22, 1997	0–2	Dallas Stars (1997–98)	11–9–4	L
25	November 26, 1997	5–10	@ Florida Panthers (1997–98)	11–10–4	L
26	November 28, 1997	2–5	Vancouver Canucks (1997–98)	11–11–4	L
27	November 29, 1997	1–1 OT	Washington Capitals (1997–98)	11–11–5	T

December: 6–5–2 (home: 3–2–0; road: 3–3–2)

Game	Date	Score	Opponent	Record	Recap
28	December 1, 1997	1–3	@ Carolina Hurricanes (1997–98)	11–12–5	L
29	December 3, 1997	3–0	@ Philadelphia Flyers (1997–98)	12–12–5	W
30	December 6, 1997	4–1	Carolina Hurricanes (1997–98)	13–12–5	W
31	December 11, 1997	2–1	Buffalo Sabres (1997–98)	14–12–5	W
32	December 13, 1997	4–2	Montreal Canadiens (1997–98)	15–12–5	W
33	December 15, 1997	6–2	@ Florida Panthers (1997–98)	16–12–5	W
34	December 17, 1997	0–2	@ Tampa Bay Lightning (1997–98)	16–13–5	L
35	December 18, 1997	2–2 OT	@ Philadelphia Flyers (1997–98)	16–13–6	T
36	December 20, 1997	3–4	New York Islanders (1997–98)	16–14–6	L
37	December 22, 1997	2–4	Detroit Red Wings (1997–98)	16–15–6	L
38	December 27, 1997	3–1	@ Tampa Bay Lightning (1997–98)	17–15–6	W
39	December 28, 1997	3–4	@ New York Rangers (1997–98)	17–16–6	L
40	December 31, 1997	2–2 OT	@ Toronto Maple Leafs (1997–98)	17–16–7	T

January: 6–4–2 (home: 5–1–2; road: 1–3–0)

Game	Date	Score	Opponent	Record	Recap
41	January 1, 1998	0–0 OT	Ottawa Senators (1997–98)	17–16–8	T
42	January 3, 1998	3–0	San Jose Sharks (1997–98)	18–16–8	W
43	January 7, 1998	2–1 OT	@ Montreal Canadiens (1997–98)	19–16–8	W
44	January 8, 1998	5–2	Phoenix Coyotes (1997–98)	20–16–8	W
45	January 12, 1998	1–1 OT	New Jersey Devils (1997–98)	20–16–9	T
46	January 14, 1998	5–2	Pittsburgh Penguins (1997–98)	21–16–9	W
47	January 21, 1998	2–4	@ Montreal Canadiens (1997–98)	21–17–9	L
48	January 24, 1998	2–4	@ Pittsburgh Penguins (1997–98)	21–18–9	L
49	January 25, 1998	1–4	@ Washington Capitals (1997–98)	21–19–9	L
50	January 27, 1998	6–1	Ottawa Senators (1997–98)	22–19–9	W
51	January 29, 1998	2–4	Pittsburgh Penguins (1997–98)	22–20–9	L
52	January 31, 1998	4–2	New York Rangers (1997–98)	23–20–9	W

February: 1–2–3 (home: 1–2–1; road: 0–0–2)

Game	Date	Score	Opponent	Record	Recap
53	February 1, 1998	2–2 OT	@ New York Islanders (1997–98)	23–20–10	T
54	February 4, 1998	2–2 OT	@ Buffalo Sabres (1997–98)	23–20–11	T
55	February 5, 1998	1–3	St. Louis Blues (1997–98)	23–21–11	L
56	February 7, 1998	1–3	Carolina Hurricanes (1997–98)	23–22–11	L
57	February 26, 1998	1–1 OT	Buffalo Sabres (1997–98)	23–22–12	T
58	February 28, 1998	6–2	Pittsburgh Penguins (1997–98)	24–22–12	W

March: 9–4–1 (home: 5–3–0; road: 4–1–1)

Game	Date	Score	Opponent	Record	Recap
59	March 1, 1998	5–4	@ New York Islanders (1997–98)	25–22–12	W
60	March 3, 1998	3–0	@ Washington Capitals (1997–98)	26–22–12	W
61	March 5, 1998	1–1 OT	@ New Jersey Devils (1997–98)	26–22–13	T
62	March 7, 1998	1–2	Chicago Blackhawks (1997–98)	26–23–13	L
63	March 10, 1998	6–3	@ Detroit Red Wings (1997–98)	27–23–13	W
64	March 12, 1998	2–5	Calgary Flames (1997–98)	27–24–13	L
65	March 14, 1998	5–1	New York Rangers (1997–98)	28–24–13	W
66	March 16, 1998	4–3 OT	Tampa Bay Lightning (1997–98)	29–24–13	W
67	March 19, 1998	4–0	Toronto Maple Leafs (1997–98)	30–24–13	W
68	March 21, 1998	2–1	@ Buffalo Sabres (1997–98)	31–24–13	W
69	March 22, 1998	0–1	@ Chicago Blackhawks (1997–98)	31–25–13	L
70	March 26, 1998	4–2	Philadelphia Flyers (1997–98)	32–25–13	W
71	March 28, 1998	2–3 OT	Florida Panthers (1997–98)	32–26–13	L
72	March 30, 1998	4–1	Colorado Avalanche (1997–98)	33–26–13	W

April: 6–4–0 (home: 2–2–0; road: 4–2–0)

Game	Date	Score	Opponent	Record	Recap
73	April 1, 1998	4–2	@ New York Rangers (1997–98)	34–26–13	W
74	April 3, 1998	4–5	@ Buffalo Sabres (1997–98)	34–27–13	L
75	April 6, 1998	0–3	Carolina Hurricanes (1997–98)	34–28–13	L
76	April 7, 1998	4–2	@ Ottawa Senators (1997–98)	35–28–13	W
77	April 9, 1998	4–1	New York Islanders (1997–98)	36–28–13	W
78	April 11, 1998	2–3	New Jersey Devils (1997–98)	36–29–13	L
79	April 13, 1998	3–2	@ Carolina Hurricanes (1997–98)	37–29–13	W
80	April 15, 1998	6–2	@ Montreal Canadiens (1997–98)	38–29–13	W
81	April 18, 1998	2–5	@ Pittsburgh Penguins (1997–98)	38–30–13	L
82	April 19, 1998	2–1	Philadelphia Flyers (1997–98)	39–30–13	W

Legend: W Win (2 points) L Loss (0 points) T Tie (1 point)

=== Playoffs ===
1998 Stanley Cup playoffs
Eastern Conference Quarterfinals vs. (4) Washington Capitals – Capitals win 4–2

Game	Date	Score	Opponent	Attendance	Series	Recap
1	April 22, 1998	1–3	@ Washington Capitals	15,117	Capitals lead 1–0	L
2	April 24, 1998	4–3 2OT	@ Washington Capitals	19,740	Series tied 1–1	W
3	April 26, 1998	2–3 2OT	Washington Capitals	15,520	Capitals lead 2–1	L
4	April 28, 1998	0–3	Washington Capitals	17,131	Capitals lead 3–1	L
5	May 1, 1998	4–0	@ Washington Capitals	19,740	Capitals lead 3–2	W
6	May 3, 1998	2–3 OT	Washington Capitals	15,163	Capitals lead 4–2	L

Legend: W Win L Loss

== Player statistics ==
=== Scoring ===
- Position abbreviations: C = Center; D = Defense; G = Goaltender; LW = Left wing; RW = Right wing
- † = Joined team via a transaction (e.g., trade, waivers, signing) during the season. Stats reflect time with the Bruins only.
- ‡ = Left team via a transaction (e.g., trade, waivers, release) during the season. Stats reflect time with the Bruins only.

No.	Player	Pos	Regular season						Playoffs					
No.	Player	Pos	GP	G	A	Pts	+/-	PIM	GP	G	A	Pts	+/-	PIM
41	Jason Allison	C	81	33	50	83	33	60	6	2	6	8	0	4
12	Dmitri Khristich	RW	82	29	37	66	25	42	6	2	2	4	1	2
77	Ray Bourque	D	82	13	35	48	2	80	6	1	4	5	−2	2
14	Sergei Samsonov	LW	81	22	25	47	9	8	6	2	5	7	1	0
23	Steve Heinze	RW	61	26	20	46	8	54	6	0	0	0	−4	6
33	Anson Carter	RW	78	16	27	43	7	31	6	1	1	2	−3	0
21	Ted Donato	LW	79	16	23	39	6	54	5	0	0	0	−3	2
26	Tim Taylor	C	79	20	11	31	−16	57	6	0	0	0	−2	10
19	Rob DiMaio	RW	79	10	17	27	−13	82	6	1	0	1	−3	8
11 (Note: Axelsson wore number 57 through December 6.)	P. J. Axelsson	LW	82	8	19	27	−14	38	6	1	0	1	−3	0
18	Kyle McLaren	D	66	5	20	25	13	56	6	1	0	1	−3	4
44	Dave Ellett	D	82	3	20	23	3	67	6	0	1	1	−1	6
42	Mike Sullivan	C	77	5	13	18	−1	34	6	0	1	1	0	2
32	Don Sweeney	D	59	1	15	16	12	24	—	—	—	—	—	—
20	Darren Van Impe†	D	50	2	8	10	4	36	6	2	1	3	0	0
36	Grant Ledyard†	D	22	2	7	9	−2	6	6	0	0	0	−3	2
6	Joe Thornton	C	55	3	4	7	−6	19	6	0	0	0	0	9
25 (Note: Gill wore number 75 through December 6.)	Hal Gill	D	68	2	4	6	4	47	6	0	0	0	−1	4
27	Landon Wilson	RW	28	1	5	6	3	7	1	0	0	0	0	0
34	Byron Dafoe	G	65	0	3	3		2	6	0	0	0		0
17	Shawn Bates	C	13	2	0	2	−3	2	—	—	—	—	—	—
37	Mattias Timander	D	23	1	1	2	−9	6	—	—	—	—	—	—
29	Dean Malkoc	D	40	1	0	1	−12	86	—	—	—	—	—	—
22	Ken Baumgartner	LW	82	0	1	1	−14	199	6	0	0	0	0	14
10	Cameron Mann	RW	9	0	1	1	1	4	—	—	—	—	—	—
30	Jim Carey	G	10	0	0	0		0	—	—	—	—	—	—
28	Dean Chynoweth	D	2	0	0	0	−4	0	—	—	—	—	—	—
45	Robert Lang‡	C	3	0	0	0	1	2	—	—	—	—	—	—
60	Kirk Nielsen	RW	6	0	0	0	−1	0	—	—	—	—	—	—
39	Joel Prpic	C	1	0	0	0	0	2	—	—	—	—	—	—
16	Randy Robitaille	C	4	0	0	0	−2	0	—	—	—	—	—	—
43	Jean-Yves Roy	RW	2	0	0	0	0	0	—	—	—	—	—	—
35	Robbie Tallas	G	14	0	0	0		0	—	—	—	—	—	—

=== Goaltending ===
No.	Player	Regular season										Playoffs								
No.	Player	GP	W	L	T	SA	GA	GAA	SV%	SO	TOI	GP	W	L	SA	GA	GAA	SV%	SO	TOI
34	Byron Dafoe	65	30	25	9	1602	138	2.24	.914	6	3693	6	2	4	159	14	1.99	.912	1	422
35	Robbie Tallas	14	6	3	3	326	24	1.83	.926	1	788	—	—	—	—	—	—	—	—	—
30	Jim Carey	10	3	2	1	225	24	2.90	.893	2	496	—	—	—	—	—	—	—	—	—

== Awards and records ==
=== Awards ===
Type	Award/honor	Recipient	Ref
League (annual)	Calder Memorial Trophy	Sergei Samsonov	
League (annual)	Jack Adams Award	Pat Burns	
League (annual)	NHL All-Rookie Team	Sergei Samsonov (Forward)	
League (in-season)	NHL All-Star Game selection	Ray Bourque (Note: Bourque was voted to the starting lineup.)	
League (in-season)	NHL Rookie of the Month	Sergei Samsonov (January)	
Team	Elizabeth C. Dufresne Trophy	Jason Allison	
Team	Seventh Player Award	Jason Allison	
Team	Three Stars Awards	Byron Dafoe (1st)	
Team	Three Stars Awards	Jason Allison (2nd)	
Team	Three Stars Awards	Ray Bourque (3rd)	

=== Milestones ===
Milestone	Player	Date	Ref
First game	P. J. Axelsson	October 2, 1997	
First game	Shawn Bates	October 2, 1997	
First game	Sergei Samsonov	October 2, 1997	
First game	Joe Thornton	October 8, 1997	
First game	Hal Gill	October 17, 1997	
First game	Kirk Nielsen	November 1, 1997	
First game	Cameron Mann	December 18, 1997	
First game	Joel Prpic	April 9, 1998	
1,000th game played	David Ellett	March 1, 1998	

== Draft picks ==
Boston's picks at the 1997 NHL entry draft in Pittsburgh, Pennsylvania.

Round	#	Player	Position	Nationality	College/Junior/Club team (League)
1	1	Joe Thornton	Center	Canada	Sault Ste. Marie Greyhounds (OHL)
1	8	Sergei Samsonov	Left wing	Russia	Detroit Vipers (IHL)
2	27	Ben Clymer	Right wing	United States	University of Wisconsin (WCHA)
3	54	Mattias Karlin	Center	Sweden	Modo Hockey (Sweden)
3	63	Lee Goren	Right wing	Canada	University of North Dakota (WCHA)
4	81	Karol Bartanus	Right wing	Slovakia	Drummondville Voltigeurs (QMJHL)
6	135	Denis Timofeyev	Defense	Russia	CSKA Moscow (Russia)
7	162	Joel Trottier	Right wing	Canada	Ottawa 67's (OHL)
7	180	Jim Baxter	Defense	Canada	Oshawa Generals (OHL)
8	191	Antti Laaksonen	Left wing	Finland	University of Denver (WCHA)
9	218	Eric Van Acker	Defense	Canada	Chicoutimi Saguenéens (QMJHL)
9	246	Jay Henderson	Left wing	Canada	Edmonton Ice (WHL)
