= 1997–98 Chicago Blackhawks season =

National Hockey League team season

1997–98 Chicago Blackhawks
- Division: 5th Central
- Conference: 9th Western
- 1997–98 record: 30–39–13
- Home record: 14–19–8
- Road record: 16–20–5
- Goals for: 192
- Goals against: 199

Team information
- General manager: Bob Murray
- Coach: Craig Hartsburg
- Captain: Chris Chelios
- Arena: United Center
- Average attendance: 18,350
- Minor league affiliates: Indianapolis Ice; Columbus Chill

Team leaders
- Goals: Tony Amonte (31); Eric Daze (31)
- Assists: Tony Amonte (42)
- Points: Tony Amonte (73)
- Penalty minutes: Jim Cummins (178)
- Plus/minus: Tony Amonte (+21)
- Wins: Jeff Hackett (21)
- Goals against average: Jeff Hackett (2.20)

The 1997–98 Chicago Blackhawks season was the 72nd season of operation of the Chicago Blackhawks in the National Hockey League (NHL). The Blackhawks did not qualify for the 1998 Stanley Cup Playoffs, which snapped their 28-year playoff streak.

== Regular season ==
The Blackhawks were shut out a league-high 11 times, tied with the Mighty Ducks of Anaheim and the Tampa Bay Lightning. With the 10 shutouts that Blackhawks goaltenders recorded, a total of 21 of Chicago's 82 regular-season games ended in a shutout. The Blackhawks also tied the Florida Panthers, New York Islanders and Pittsburgh Penguins for the most short-handed goals allowed, with 16. Also, the Blackhawks missed the playoffs for the first time since 1969.

=== Final standings ===
Central Division
No.	CR		GP	W	L	T	GF	GA	Pts
1	1	**Dallas Stars**	82	49	22	11	242	167	109
2	3	**Detroit Red Wings**	82	44	23	15	250	196	103
3	4	**St. Louis Blues**	82	45	29	8	256	204	98
4	6	**Phoenix Coyotes**	82	35	35	12	224	227	82
5	9	Chicago Blackhawks	82	30	39	13	192	199	73
6	10	Toronto Maple Leafs	82	30	43	9	194	237	69

Western Conference
R		Div	GP	W	L	T	GF	GA	Pts
**1**	**p – Dallas Stars**	**CEN**	**82**	**49**	**22**	**11**	**242**	**167**	**109**
**2**	**x – Colorado Avalanche**	**PAC**	**82**	**39**	**26**	**17**	**231**	**205**	**95**
**3**	**Detroit Red Wings**	**CEN**	**82**	**44**	**23**	**15**	**250**	**196**	**103**
**4**	**St. Louis Blues**	**CEN**	**82**	**45**	**29**	**8**	**256**	**204**	**98**
**5**	**Los Angeles Kings**	**PAC**	**82**	**38**	**33**	**11**	**227**	**225**	**87**
**6**	**Phoenix Coyotes**	**CEN**	**82**	**35**	**35**	**12**	**224**	**227**	**82**
**7**	**Edmonton Oilers**	**PAC**	**82**	**35**	**37**	**10**	**215**	**224**	**80**
**8**	**San Jose Sharks**	**PAC**	**82**	**34**	**38**	**10**	**210**	**216**	**78**
9	Chicago Blackhawks	CEN	82	30	39	13	192	199	73
10	Toronto Maple Leafs	CEN	82	30	43	9	194	237	69
11	Calgary Flames	PAC	82	26	41	15	217	252	67
12	Mighty Ducks of Anaheim	PAC	82	26	43	13	205	261	65
13	Vancouver Canucks	PAC	82	25	43	14	224	273	64

Divisions: CEN – Central, PAC – Pacific

bold – Qualified for playoffs; x – Won Division; p – Won Presidents' Trophy

== Schedule and results ==
1997–98 regular season
October: 4–10–0 (home: 3–5–0; road: 1–5–0)

Game	Date	Score	Opponent	Record	Recap
1	October 1, 1997	2–6	@ Phoenix Coyotes (1997–98)	0–1–0	L
2	October 4, 1997	2–3	@ San Jose Sharks (1997–98)	0–2–0	L
3	October 9, 1997	1–4	Tampa Bay Lightning (1997–98)	0–3–0	L
4	October 10, 1997	0–7	@ Dallas Stars (1997–98)	0–4–0	L
5	October 13, 1997	1–2	@ Phoenix Coyotes (1997–98)	0–5–0	L
6	October 15, 1997	0–2	Washington Capitals (1997–98)	0–6–0	L
7	October 17, 1997	0–2	St. Louis Blues (1997–98)	0–7–0	L
8	October 19, 1997	5–2	Buffalo Sabres (1997–98)	1–7–0	W
9	October 22, 1997	1–0	@ New York Rangers (1997–98)	2–7–0	W
10	October 24, 1997	0–2	Dallas Stars (1997–98)	2–8–0	L
11	October 26, 1997	2–3	Carolina Hurricanes (1997–98)	2–9–0	L
12	October 27, 1997	2–4	@ Montreal Canadiens (1997–98)	2–10–0	L
13	October 29, 1997	3–0	Vancouver Canucks (1997–98)	3–10–0	W
14	October 31, 1997	5–3	San Jose Sharks (1997–98)	4–10–0	W

November: 6–3–4 (home: 2–1–2; road: 4–2–2)

Game	Date	Score	Opponent	Record	Recap
15	November 2, 1997	3–1	Pittsburgh Penguins (1997–98)	5–10–0	W
16	November 6, 1997	2–1	St. Louis Blues (1997–98)	6–10–0	W
17	November 8, 1997	4–2	@ New York Islanders (1997–98)	7–10–0	W
18	November 10, 1997	1–1 OT	Calgary Flames (1997–98)	7–10–1	T
19	November 11, 1997	2–5	@ Toronto Maple Leafs (1997–98)	7–11–1	L
20	November 13, 1997	1–2	Toronto Maple Leafs (1997–98)	7–12–1	L
21	November 16, 1997	3–3 OT	Detroit Red Wings (1997–98)	7–12–2	T
22	November 19, 1997	4–0	@ Mighty Ducks of Anaheim (1997–98)	8–12–2	W
23	November 20, 1997	3–4	@ Los Angeles Kings (1997–98)	8–13–2	L
24	November 22, 1997	5–4 OT	@ Vancouver Canucks (1997–98)	9–13–2	W
25	November 25, 1997	2–2 OT	@ Edmonton Oilers (1997–98)	9–13–3	T
26	November 27, 1997	2–2 OT	@ Calgary Flames (1997–98)	9–13–4	T
27	November 29, 1997	3–2	@ Ottawa Senators (1997–98)	10–13–4	W

December: 4–5–3 (home: 1–4–2; road: 3–1–1)

Game	Date	Score	Opponent	Record	Recap
28	December 4, 1997	1–2	Colorado Avalanche (1997–98)	10–14–4	L
29	December 7, 1997	3–3 OT	Edmonton Oilers (1997–98)	10–14–5	T
30	December 10, 1997	3–3 OT	Phoenix Coyotes (1997–98)	10–14–6	T
31	December 12, 1997	2–3	Philadelphia Flyers (1997–98)	10–15–6	L
32	December 14, 1997	1–2	San Jose Sharks (1997–98)	10–16–6	L
33	December 16, 1997	3–4 OT	@ Calgary Flames (1997–98)	10–17–6	L
34	December 17, 1997	0–0 OT	@ Edmonton Oilers (1997–98)	10–17–7	T
35	December 20, 1997	5–0	@ Vancouver Canucks (1997–98)	11–17–7	W
36	December 22, 1997	0–1	Los Angeles Kings (1997–98)	11–18–7	L
37	December 26, 1997	4–1	@ St. Louis Blues (1997–98)	12–18–7	W
38	December 28, 1997	2–0	Mighty Ducks of Anaheim (1997–98)	13–18–7	W
39	December 30, 1997	6–2	@ New Jersey Devils (1997–98)	14–18–7	W

January: 7–4–2 (home: 4–2–2; road: 3–2–0)

Game	Date	Score	Opponent	Record	Recap
40	January 1, 1998	3–3 OT	Toronto Maple Leafs (1997–98)	14–18–8	T
41	January 4, 1998	3–1	Detroit Red Wings (1997–98)	15–18–8	W
42	January 5, 1998	1–1 OT	Calgary Flames (1997–98)	15–18–9	T
43	January 9, 1998	2–4	Phoenix Coyotes (1997–98)	15–19–9	L
44	January 10, 1998	4–3	@ Toronto Maple Leafs (1997–98)	16–19–9	W
45	January 12, 1998	3–2	Vancouver Canucks (1997–98)	17–19–9	W
46	January 14, 1998	4–1	@ Carolina Hurricanes (1997–98)	18–19–9	W
47	January 15, 1998	2–3	@ Washington Capitals (1997–98)	18–20–9	L
48	January 20, 1998	5–2	New York Islanders (1997–98)	19–20–9	W
49	January 22, 1998	0–3	Toronto Maple Leafs (1997–98)	19–21–9	L
50	January 24, 1998	5–4	St. Louis Blues (1997–98)	20–21–9	W
51	January 29, 1998	3–0	@ San Jose Sharks (1997–98)	21–21–9	W
52	January 31, 1998	0–3	@ Los Angeles Kings (1997–98)	21–22–9	L

February: 2–4–0 (home: 0–1–0; road: 2–3–0)

Game	Date	Score	Opponent	Record	Recap
53	February 1, 1998	3–4 OT	@ Mighty Ducks of Anaheim (1997–98)	21–23–9	L
54	February 3, 1998	4–2	@ Phoenix Coyotes (1997–98)	22–23–9	W
55	February 5, 1998	2–4	@ Colorado Avalanche (1997–98)	22–24–9	L
56	February 7, 1998	1–3	@ Dallas Stars (1997–98)	22–25–9	L
57	February 26, 1998	4–7	Los Angeles Kings (1997–98)	22–26–9	L
58	February 28, 1998	4–0	@ Colorado Avalanche (1997–98)	23–26–9	W

March: 6–7–3 (home: 3–3–1; road: 3–4–2)

Game	Date	Score	Opponent	Record	Recap
59	March 1, 1998	2–2 OT	Dallas Stars (1997–98)	23–26–10	T
60	March 3, 1998	3–5	@ St. Louis Blues (1997–98)	23–27–10	L
61	March 5, 1998	2–2 OT	@ Pittsburgh Penguins (1997–98)	23–27–11	T
62	March 7, 1998	2–1	@ Boston Bruins (1997–98)	24–27–11	W
63	March 9, 1998	3–4 OT	Edmonton Oilers (1997–98)	24–28–11	L
64	March 12, 1998	0–3	@ Detroit Red Wings (1997–98)	24–29–11	L
65	March 14, 1998	0–1	@ Tampa Bay Lightning (1997–98)	24–30–11	L
66	March 15, 1998	8–4	@ Florida Panthers (1997–98)	25–30–11	W
67	March 17, 1998	5–3	@ Buffalo Sabres (1997–98)	26–30–11	W
68	March 19, 1998	1–0	Montreal Canadiens (1997–98)	27–30–11	W
69	March 22, 1998	1–0	Boston Bruins (1997–98)	28–30–11	W
70	March 23, 1998	5–5 OT	@ Detroit Red Wings (1997–98)	28–30–12	T
71	March 25, 1998	2–3	Mighty Ducks of Anaheim (1997–98)	28–31–12	L
72	March 27, 1998	2–1	Ottawa Senators (1997–98)	29–31–12	W
73	March 29, 1998	0–4	Florida Panthers (1997–98)	29–32–12	L
74	March 31, 1998	2–3	@ Philadelphia Flyers (1997–98)	29–33–12	L

April: 1–6–1 (home: 1–3–1; road: 0–3–0)

Game	Date	Score	Opponent	Record	Recap
75	April 2, 1998	2–1	Colorado Avalanche (1997–98)	30–33–12	W
76	April 4, 1998	2–3	Detroit Red Wings (1997–98)	30–34–12	L
77	April 5, 1998	1–2 OT	New York Rangers (1997–98)	30–35–12	L
78	April 9, 1998	2–3	@ St. Louis Blues (1997–98)	30–36–12	L
79	April 12, 1998	1–2	Phoenix Coyotes (1997–98)	30–37–12	L
80	April 15, 1998	2–3	@ Toronto Maple Leafs (1997–98)	30–38–12	L
81	April 16, 1998	1–1 OT	New Jersey Devils (1997–98)	30–38–13	T
82	April 18, 1998	1–3	@ Dallas Stars (1997–98)	30–39–13	L

Legend: W Win (2 points) L Loss (0 points) T Tie (1 point)

== Player statistics ==
=== Scoring ===
- Position abbreviations: C = Center; D = Defense; G = Goaltender; LW = Left wing; RW = Right wing
- † = Joined team via a transaction (e.g., trade, waivers, signing) during the season. Stats reflect time with the Blackhawks only.
- ‡ = Left team via a transaction (e.g., trade, waivers, release) during the season. Stats reflect time with the Blackhawks only.

No.	Player	Pos	Regular season					
No.	Player	Pos	GP	G	A	Pts	+/-	PIM
10	Tony Amonte	RW	82	31	42	73	21	66
36	Alexei Zhamnov	C	70	21	28	49	16	61
55	Eric Daze	RW	80	31	11	42	4	22
20	Gary Suter	D	73	14	28	42	1	74
7	Chris Chelios	D	81	3	39	42	−7	151
22	Greg Johnson†	C	69	11	22	33	−2	38
11	Jeff Shantz	C	61	11	20	31	0	36
25	Sergei Krivokrasov	LW	58	10	13	23	−1	33
2	Eric Weinrich	D	82	2	21	23	10	106
19	Ethan Moreau	LW	54	9	9	18	0	73
14	Steve Dubinsky	C	82	5	13	18	−6	57
38	James Black	RW	52	10	5	15	−8	8
4	Keith Carney‡	D	60	2	13	15	−7	73
23	Jean-Yves Leroux	LW	66	6	7	13	−2	55
46	Dmitri Nabokov	C	25	7	4	11	−1	10
17	Kevin Miller	RW	37	4	7	11	−4	8
15	Chad Kilger†	C	22	3	8	11	2	6
3	Christian Laflamme	D	72	0	11	11	14	59
12	Brent Sutter	RW	52	2	6	8	−6	28
33	Reid Simpson†	LW	38	3	2	5	−1	102
54	Brian Felsner	LW	12	1	3	4	0	12
6	Michal Sykora	D	28	1	3	4	−10	12
24	Bob Probert	LW	14	2	1	3	−7	48
39 (Note: Mills wore number 46 for a single game on January 10.)	Craig Mills	RW	20	0	3	3	1	34
8	Cam Russell	D	41	1	1	2	3	79
15	Jim Cummins‡	RW	55	0	2	2	−9	178
4	Jayson More†	D	17	0	2	2	7	8
26	Todd White	C	7	1	0	1	0	2
5	Trent Yawney	D	45	1	0	1	−5	76
16	Jarrod Skalde†‡†‡	C	7	0	1	1	0	4
40	Chris Terreri	G	21	0	1	1		2
34	Ryan VandenBussche†	RW	4	0	1	1	0	5
32	Daniel Cleary	LW	6	0	0	0	−2	0
16	Martin Gendron†‡	RW	2	0	0	0	−1	0
31	Jeff Hackett	G	58	0	0	0		8
56	Ryan Huska	LW	1	0	0	0	0	0
29	Andrei Trefilov†	G	6	0	0	0		0
17	Petri Varis	LW	1	0	0	0	0	0

=== Goaltending ===
- † = Joined team via a transaction (e.g., trade, waivers, signing) during the season. Stats reflect time with the Blackhawks only.

No.	Player	Regular season									
No.	Player	GP	W	L	T	SA	GA	GAA	SV%	SO	TOI
31	Jeff Hackett	58	21	25	11	1520	126	2.20	.917	8	3441
40	Chris Terreri	21	8	10	2	519	49	2.41	.906	2	1222
29	Andrei Trefilov†	6	1	4	0	145	17	3.41	.883	0	299

== Awards and records ==
=== Awards ===
Type	Award/honor	Recipient	Ref
League (in-season)	NHL All-Star Game selection	Tony Amonte	
League (in-season)	NHL All-Star Game selection	Chris Chelios	

=== Milestones ===
Milestone	Player	Date	Ref
First game	Daniel Cleary	October 1, 1997	
First game	Todd White	October 4, 1997	
First game	Brian Felsner	November 16, 1997	
First game	Petri Varis	December 14, 1997	
First game	Dmitri Nabokov	December 20, 1997	
First game	Ryan Huska	January 5, 1998	
600th assist	Chris Chelios	March 7, 1998	
1,000th game played	Chris Chelios	April 16, 1998	

== Draft picks ==
Chicago's draft picks at the 1997 NHL entry draft held at the Civic Arena in Pittsburgh, Pennsylvania.

Round	#	Player	Nationality	College/Junior/Club team (League)
1	13	Daniel Cleary	Canada	Belleville Bulls (OHL)
1	16	Ty Jones	United States	Spokane Chiefs (WHL)
2	39	Jeremy Reich	Canada	Seattle Thunderbirds (WHL)
3	67	Michael Souza	United States	University of New Hampshire (Hockey East)
5	110	Ben Simon	United States	University of Notre Dame (CCHA)
5	120	Pete Gardiner	Canada	Rensselaer Polytechnic Institute (ECAC)
5	130	Kyle Calder	Canada	Regina Pats (WHL)
6	147	Heath Gordon	United States	Green Bay Gamblers (USHL)
7	174	Jerad Smith	Canada	Portland Winter Hawks (WHL)
8	204	Sergei Shikhanov	Russia	Lada Togliatti (Russia)
9	230	Chris Feil	United States	Ohio State University (CCHA)

== See also ==
- 1997–98 NHL season
