= 1997–98 Buffalo Sabres season =

NHL hockey team season

1997–98 Buffalo Sabres
- Division: 3rd Northeast
- Conference: 6th Eastern
- 1997–98 record: 36–29–17
- Home record: 20–13–8
- Road record: 16–16–9
- Goals for: 211
- Goals against: 187

Team information
- General manager: Darcy Regier
- Coach: Lindy Ruff
- Captain: Vacant (Oct.–Nov.); Michael Peca (Nov.–Apr.)
- Arena: Marine Midland Arena
- Average attendance: 15,634
- Minor league affiliates: Rochester Americans; South Carolina Stingrays

Team leaders
- Goals: Donald Audette (24)
- Assists: Alexei Zhitnik (30)
- Points: Miroslav Satan (46)
- Penalty minutes: Matthew Barnaby (289)
- Plus/minus: Darryl Shannon (+26)
- Wins: Dominik Hasek (33)
- Goals against average: Dominik Hasek (2.09)

The 1997–98 Buffalo Sabres season was the 28th season for the National Hockey League (NHL) franchise that was established on May 22, 1970. In the Playoffs, the Sabres reached the Conference Finals for the first time since 1980.

== Regular season ==
On March 19, 1998, the Sabres scored three short-handed goals in a 6–1 win over the Florida Panthers.

The Sabres finished the regular season with 13 shutouts, the most in the NHL.

=== Season standings ===
Northeast Division
No.	CR		GP	W	L	T	GF	GA	Pts
1	2	**Pittsburgh Penguins**	82	40	24	18	228	188	98
2	5	**Boston Bruins**	82	39	30	13	221	194	91
3	6	**Buffalo Sabres**	82	36	29	17	211	187	89
4	7	**Montreal Canadiens**	82	37	32	13	235	208	87
5	8	**Ottawa Senators**	82	34	33	15	193	200	83
6	9	Carolina Hurricanes	82	33	41	8	200	219	74

Eastern Conference
R		Div	GP	W	L	T	GF	GA	Pts
**1**	**New Jersey Devils**	**ATL**	**82**	**48**	**23**	**11**	**225**	**166**	**107**
**2**	**Pittsburgh Penguins**	**NE**	**82**	**40**	**24**	**18**	**228**	**188**	**98**
**3**	**Philadelphia Flyers**	**ATL**	**82**	**42**	**29**	**11**	**242**	**193**	**95**
**4**	**Washington Capitals**	**ATL**	**82**	**40**	**30**	**12**	**219**	**202**	**92**
**5**	**Boston Bruins**	**NE**	**82**	**39**	**30**	**13**	**221**	**194**	**91**
**6**	**Buffalo Sabres**	**NE**	**82**	**36**	**29**	**17**	**211**	**187**	**89**
**7**	**Montreal Canadiens**	**NE**	**82**	**37**	**32**	**13**	**235**	**208**	**87**
**8**	**Ottawa Senators**	**NE**	**82**	**34**	**33**	**15**	**193**	**200**	**83**
9	Carolina Hurricanes	NE	82	33	41	8	200	219	74
10	New York Islanders	ATL	82	30	41	11	212	225	71
11	New York Rangers	ATL	82	25	39	18	197	231	68
12	Florida Panthers	ATL	82	24	43	15	203	256	63
13	Tampa Bay Lightning	ATL	82	17	55	10	151	269	44

Divisions: ATL – Atlantic, NE – Northeast

bold – Qualified for playoffs

== Schedule and results ==
=== Regular season ===
1997–98 regular season
October: 4–7–2 (home: 2–2–0; road: 2–5–2)

Game	Date	Score	Opponent	Record	Recap
1	October 1, 1997	3–1	@ St. Louis Blues (1997–98)	1–0–0	W
2	October 3, 1997	2–6	@ Washington Capitals (1997–98)	1–1–0	L
3	October 5, 1997	1–1 OT	@ Tampa Bay Lightning (1997–98)	1–1–1	T
4	October 7, 1997	2–4	Dallas Stars (1997–98)	1–2–1	L
5	October 9, 1997	5–2	Washington Capitals (1997–98)	2–2–1	W
6	October 11, 1997	2–3	@ New Jersey Devils (1997–98)	2–3–1	L
7	October 15, 1997	3–3 OT	@ Carolina Hurricanes (1997–98)	2–3–2	T
8	October 17, 1997	1–5	Montreal Canadiens (1997–98)	2–4–2	L
9	October 19, 1997	2–5	@ Chicago Blackhawks (1997–98)	2–5–2	L
10	October 22, 1997	4–1	Calgary Flames (1997–98)	3–5–2	W
11	October 26, 1997	1–6	@ Phoenix Coyotes (1997–98)	3–6–2	L
12	October 28, 1997	2–3	@ Colorado Avalanche (1997–98)	3–7–2	L
13	October 31, 1997	3–2 OT	@ Carolina Hurricanes (1997–98)	4–7–2	W

November: 3–5–3 (home: 1–4–2; road: 2–1–1)

Game	Date	Score	Opponent	Record	Recap
14	November 1, 1997	4–3 OT	@ Florida Panthers (1997–98)	5–7–2	W
15	November 6, 1997	2–4	Florida Panthers (1997–98)	5–8–2	L
16	November 8, 1997	2–2 OT	@ Pittsburgh Penguins (1997–98)	5–8–3	T
17	November 10, 1997	4–4 OT	Edmonton Oilers (1997–98)	5–8–4	T
18	November 13, 1997	2–3	Washington Capitals (1997–98)	5–9–4	L
19	November 15, 1997	2–3	New Jersey Devils (1997–98)	5–10–4	L
20	November 20, 1997	5–0	@ Boston Bruins (1997–98)	6–10–4	W
21	November 22, 1997	6–1	New York Islanders (1997–98)	7–10–4	W
22	November 24, 1997	1–5	@ Pittsburgh Penguins (1997–98)	7–11–4	L
23	November 26, 1997	1–3	Philadelphia Flyers (1997–98)	7–12–4	L
24	November 28, 1997	3–3 OT	New York Rangers (1997–98)	7–12–5	T

December: 7–7–1 (home: 6–2–0; road: 1–5–1)

Game	Date	Score	Opponent	Record	Recap
25	December 1, 1997	1–1 OT	@ Philadelphia Flyers (1997–98)	7–12–6	T
26	December 3, 1997	4–0	Mighty Ducks of Anaheim (1997–98)	8–12–6	W
27	December 5, 1997	4–0	Tampa Bay Lightning (1997–98)	9–12–6	W
28	December 6, 1997	0–3	@ Ottawa Senators (1997–98)	9–13–6	L
29	December 11, 1997	1–2	@ Boston Bruins (1997–98)	9–14–6	L
30	December 12, 1997	3–2 OT	Carolina Hurricanes (1997–98)	10–14–6	W
31	December 15, 1997	4–8	@ Dallas Stars (1997–98)	10–15–6	L
32	December 17, 1997	0–4	@ New York Islanders (1997–98)	10–16–6	L
33	December 19, 1997	1–0	Montreal Canadiens (1997–98)	11–16–6	W
34	December 21, 1997	2–0	@ New York Rangers (1997–98)	12–16–6	W
35	December 23, 1997	1–3	Detroit Red Wings (1997–98)	12–17–6	L
36	December 26, 1997	3–0	New York Rangers (1997–98)	13–17–6	W
37	December 27, 1997	1–4	@ Carolina Hurricanes (1997–98)	13–18–6	L
38	December 29, 1997	1–3	New Jersey Devils (1997–98)	13–19–6	L
39	December 31, 1997	3–0	Ottawa Senators (1997–98)	14–19–6	W

January: 5–2–4 (home: 3–0–3; road: 2–2–1)

Game	Date	Score	Opponent	Record	Recap
40	January 2, 1998	2–2 OT	Colorado Avalanche (1997–98)	14–19–7	T
41	January 7, 1998	3–2	@ Mighty Ducks of Anaheim (1997–98)	15–19–7	W
42	January 8, 1998	2–2 OT	@ Los Angeles Kings (1997–98)	15–19–8	T
43	January 10, 1998	2–5	@ San Jose Sharks (1997–98)	15–20–8	L
44	January 14, 1998	4–1	@ Toronto Maple Leafs (1997–98)	16–20–8	W
45	January 15, 1998	6–2	Vancouver Canucks (1997–98)	17–20–8	W
46	January 20, 1998	0–3	@ Philadelphia Flyers (1997–98)	17–21–8	L
47	January 21, 1998	2–1	Carolina Hurricanes (1997–98)	18–21–8	W
48	January 23, 1998	4–1	Tampa Bay Lightning (1997–98)	19–21–8	W
49	January 27, 1998	3–3 OT	St. Louis Blues (1997–98)	19–21–9	T
50	January 30, 1998	3–3 OT	Phoenix Coyotes (1997–98)	19–21–10	T

February: 3–0–4 (home: 0–0–3; road: 3–0–1)

Game	Date	Score	Opponent	Record	Recap
51	February 1, 1998	5–2	@ Florida Panthers (1997–98)	20–21–10	W
52	February 2, 1998	7–3	@ Tampa Bay Lightning (1997–98)	21–21–10	W
53	February 4, 1998	2–2 OT	Boston Bruins (1997–98)	21–21–11	T
54	February 6, 1998	2–2 OT	Pittsburgh Penguins (1997–98)	21–21–12	T
55	February 7, 1998	4–1	@ Montreal Canadiens (1997–98)	22–21–12	W
56	February 25, 1998	2–2 OT	Toronto Maple Leafs (1997–98)	22–21–13	T
57	February 26, 1998	1–1 OT	@ Boston Bruins (1997–98)	22–21–14	T

March: 9–5–1 (home: 3–3–0; road: 6–2–1)

Game	Date	Score	Opponent	Record	Recap
58	March 1, 1998	3–0	@ Washington Capitals (1997–98)	23–21–14	W
59	March 2, 1998	1–0	@ New York Rangers (1997–98)	24–21–14	W
60	March 6, 1998	2–4	New York Islanders (1997–98)	24–22–14	L
61	March 7, 1998	2–1	@ Montreal Canadiens (1997–98)	25–22–14	W
62	March 10, 1998	2–2 OT	@ New York Islanders (1997–98)	25–22–15	T
63	March 12, 1998	3–1	San Jose Sharks (1997–98)	26–22–15	W
64	March 14, 1998	1–2	@ Pittsburgh Penguins (1997–98)	26–23–15	L
65	March 15, 1998	3–0	Pittsburgh Penguins (1997–98)	27–23–15	W
66	March 17, 1998	3–5	Chicago Blackhawks (1997–98)	27–24–15	L
67	March 19, 1998	6–1	Florida Panthers (1997–98)	28–24–15	W
68	March 21, 1998	1–2	Boston Bruins (1997–98)	28–25–15	L
69	March 24, 1998	2–0	@ Calgary Flames (1997–98)	29–25–15	W
70	March 26, 1998	5–2	@ Vancouver Canucks (1997–98)	30–25–15	W
71	March 27, 1998	1–0	@ Edmonton Oilers (1997–98)	31–25–15	W
72	March 29, 1998	2–4	@ Detroit Red Wings (1997–98)	31–26–15	L

April: 5–3–2 (home: 5–2–0; road: 0–1–2)

Game	Date	Score	Opponent	Record	Recap
73	April 1, 1998	4–0	Los Angeles Kings (1997–98)	32–26–15	W
74	April 3, 1998	5–4	Boston Bruins (1997–98)	33–26–15	W
75	April 5, 1998	0–1	Ottawa Senators (1997–98)	33–27–15	L
76	April 8, 1998	3–1	Carolina Hurricanes (1997–98)	34–27–15	W
77	April 10, 1998	2–1	Montreal Canadiens (1997–98)	35–27–15	W
78	April 11, 1998	4–4 OT	@ Ottawa Senators (1997–98)	35–27–16	T
79	April 13, 1998	2–1	Philadelphia Flyers (1997–98)	36–27–16	W
80	April 15, 1998	4–5 OT	@ New Jersey Devils (1997–98)	36–28–16	L
81	April 18, 1998	3–3 OT	@ Montreal Canadiens (1997–98)	36–28–17	T
82	April 19, 1998	1–2	Ottawa Senators (1997–98)	36–29–17	L

Legend: W Win (2 points) L Loss (0 points) T Tie (1 point)

=== Playoffs ===
1998 Stanley Cup playoffs
Eastern Conference Quarterfinals vs. (3) Philadelphia Flyers – Sabres win 4–1

Game	Date	Score	Opponent	Series	Recap
1	April 22, 1998	3–2	@ Philadelphia Flyers	Sabres lead 1–0	W
2	April 24, 1998	2–3	@ Philadelphia Flyers	Series tied 1–1	L
3	April 27, 1998	6–1	Philadelphia Flyers	Sabres lead 2–1	W
4	April 29, 1998	4–1	Philadelphia Flyers	Sabres lead 3–1	W
5	May 1, 1998	3–2 OT	@ Philadelphia Flyers	Sabres win 4–1	W

Eastern Conference Semifinals vs. (7) Montreal Canadiens – Sabres win 4–0

Game	Date	Score	Opponent	Series	Recap
1	May 8, 1998	3–2 OT	Montreal Canadiens	Sabres lead 1–0	W
2	May 10, 1998	6–3	Montreal Canadiens	Sabres lead 2–0	W
3	May 12, 1998	5–4 2OT	@ Montreal Canadiens	Sabres lead 3–0	W
4	May 14, 1998	3–1	@ Montreal Canadiens	Sabres win 4–0	W

Eastern Conference Finals vs. (4) Washington Capitals – Capitals win 4–2

Game	Date	Score	Opponent	Series	Recap
1	May 23, 1998	2–0	@ Washington Capitals	Sabres lead 1–0	W
2	May 25, 1998	2–3 OT	@ Washington Capitals	Series tied 1–1	L
3	May 28, 1998	3–4 OT	Washington Capitals	Capitals lead 2–1	L
4	May 30, 1998	0–2	Washington Capitals	Capitals lead 3–1	L
5	June 2, 1998	2–1	@ Washington Capitals	Capitals lead 3–2	W
6	June 4, 1998	2–3 OT	Washington Capitals	Capitals win 4–2	L

Legend: W Win L Loss

== Player statistics ==
=== Scoring ===
- Position abbreviations: C = Center; D = Defense; G = Goaltender; LW = Left wing; RW = Right wing
- † = Joined team via a transaction (e.g., trade, waivers, signing) during the season. Stats reflect time with the Sabres only.
- ‡ = Left team via a transaction (e.g., trade, waivers, release) during the season. Stats reflect time with the Sabres only.

No.	Player	Pos	Regular season						Playoffs					
No.	Player	Pos	GP	G	A	Pts	+/-	PIM	GP	G	A	Pts	+/-	PIM
81	Miroslav Satan	LW	79	22	24	46	2	34	14	5	4	9	−9	4
44	Alexei Zhitnik	D	78	15	30	45	19	102	15	0	3	3	1	36
28	Donald Audette	RW	75	24	20	44	10	59	15	5	8	13	−4	10
27	Michael Peca	C	61	18	22	40	12	57	13	3	2	5	4	8
17	Jason Dawe‡	RW	68	19	17	36	10	36	—	—	—	—	—	—
19	Brian Holzinger	C	69	14	21	35	−2	36	15	4	7	11	−2	18
5	Jason Woolley	D	71	9	26	35	8	35	15	2	9	11	8	12
26	Derek Plante	C	72	13	21	34	8	26	11	0	3	3	1	10
18	Michal Grosek	LW	67	10	20	30	9	60	15	6	4	10	5	28
36	Matthew Barnaby	RW	72	5	20	25	8	289	15	7	6	13	6	22
37	Curtis Brown	C	63	12	12	24	11	34	13	1	2	3	6	10
15	Dixon Ward	RW	71	10	13	23	9	42	15	3	8	11	8	6
8	Darryl Shannon	D	76	3	19	22	26	56	15	2	4	6	0	8
42	Richard Smehlik	D	72	3	17	20	11	62	15	0	2	2	3	6
74	Jay McKee	D	56	1	13	14	−1	42	1	0	0	0	−1	0
22	Wayne Primeau	C	69	6	6	12	9	87	14	1	3	4	−1	6
25	Vaclav Varada	RW	27	5	6	11	0	15	15	3	4	7	3	18
10	Brad May‡	LW	36	4	7	11	2	113	—	—	—	—	—	—
12	Randy Burridge	LW	30	4	6	10	0	0	—	—	—	—	—	—
80	Geoff Sanderson†	LW	26	4	5	9	6	20	14	3	1	4	0	4
4	Mike Wilson	D	66	4	4	8	13	48	15	0	1	1	−4	13
32	Rob Ray	RW	63	2	4	6	2	234	10	0	0	0	−2	24
9	Erik Rasmussen	C	21	2	3	5	2	14	—	—	—	—	—	—
6	Bob Boughner	D	69	1	3	4	5	165	14	0	4	4	9	15
24	Paul Kruse†	LW	12	1	1	2	1	49	1	1	0	1	1	4
39	Dominik Hasek	G	72	0	2	2		12	15	0	0	0		4
21	Mike Hurlbut	D	3	0	0	0	−1	2	—	—	—	—	—	—
40	Rumun Ndur	D	1	0	0	0	−1	2	—	—	—	—	—	—
45	Scott Nichol	C	3	0	0	0	0	4	—	—	—	—	—	—
31	Steve Shields	G	16	0	0	0		17	—	—	—	—	—	—

=== Goaltending ===
No.	Player	Regular season										Playoffs								
No.	Player	GP	W	L	T	SA	GA	GAA	SV%	SO	TOI	GP	W	L	SA	GA	GAA	SV%	SO	TOI
39	Dominik Hasek	72	33	23	13	2149	147	2.09	.932	13	4219:36	15	10	5	514	32	2.03	.938	1	947:55
31	Steve Shields	16	3	6	4	408	37	2.83	.909	0	784:49	—	—	—	—	—	—	—	—	—

== Awards and records ==
=== Awards ===
Type	Award/honor	Recipient	Ref
League (annual)	Hart Memorial Trophy	Dominik Hasek	
League (annual)	Lester B. Pearson Award	Dominik Hasek	
League (annual)	NHL First All-Star team	Dominik Hasek (Goaltender)	
League (annual)	Vezina Trophy	Dominik Hasek	
League (in-season)	NHL All-Star Game selection	Dominik Hasek (Note: Hasek was voted to the starting lineup.)	

=== Milestones ===
Milestone	Player	Date	Ref
First game	Erik Rasmussen	October 1, 1997	
25th shutout	Dominik Hasek	December 21, 1997	

== Draft picks ==
Buffalo's picks at the 1997 NHL entry draft in Pittsburgh, Pennsylvania.

Round	#	Player	Nationality	College/junior/club team
1	21	Mika Noronen (G)	Finland	Tappara (SM-liiga)
2	48	Henrik Tallinder (D)	Sweden	AIK IF Jr. (Sweden)
3	69	Maxim Afinogenov (RW)	Russia	Dynamo Moscow (Russia)
3	75	Jeff Martin (C)	Canada	Windsor Spitfires (OHL)
4	101	Luc Theoret (D)	Canada	Lethbridge Hurricanes (WHL)
5	128	Torrey DiRoberto (C)	United States	Seattle Thunderbirds (WHL)
6	156	Brian Campbell (D)	Canada	Ottawa 67's (OHL)
7	184	Jeremy Adduono (RW)	Canada	Sudbury Wolves (OHL)
8	212	Kamil Piros (RW)	Czech Republic	HC Chemopetrol Jr. (Czech Republic)
9	238	Dylan Kemp (D)	Canada	Lethbridge Hurricanes (WHL)
