= 1997–98 Vancouver Canucks season =

NHL hockey team season

1997–98 Vancouver Canucks
- Division: 7th Pacific
- Conference: 13th Western
- 1997–98 record: 25–43–14
- Home record: 15–22–4
- Road record: 10–21–10
- Goals for: 224
- Goals against: 273

Team information
- General manager: Pat Quinn (Oct.–Nov.)
- Coach: Tom Renney (Oct.–Nov.); Mike Keenan (Nov.–Apr.)
- Captain: Mark Messier
- Alternate captains: Dave Babych (Oct.–Mar.); Pavel Bure; Trevor Linden (Oct.–Jan.); Bryan McCabe (Mar.–Apr.); Dana Murzyn (Jan.–Apr.)
- Arena: General Motors Place
- Average attendance: 17,120
- Minor league affiliate: Syracuse Crunch

Team leaders
- Goals: Pavel Bure (51)
- Assists: Pavel Bure (39)
- Points: Pavel Bure (90)
- Penalty minutes: Donald Brashear (372)
- Plus/minus: Peter Zezel (+13)
- Wins: Arturs Irbe (14)
- Goals against average: Arturs Irbe (2.73)

The 1997–98 Vancouver Canucks season was the team's 28th season in the National Hockey League (NHL). After missing the playoffs the season before, the team responded by signing Mark Messier to a three-year contract. The signing of Messier did little to improve the team, however, as they finished even worse than the year before, costing Head Coach Tom Renney and General Manager Pat Quinn their jobs. For the first time in NHL history, regular season games were played outside of North America, with the Canucks playing the Mighty Ducks of Anaheim in Tokyo, Japan, to open up the regular season. Pavel Bure became the last Canuck to score 50 or more goals in a season. On April 9, 1998, the Canucks scored three short-handed goals in a 6–3 road win over the Calgary Flames.

In addition, the team introduced a new logo that would stay in use since its debut, with minor colour alterations.

The team was the last in NHL history to record over 2,000 penalty minutes, with 2,148.

== Off-season ==
Forward Trevor Linden resigned the team captaincy, in favour of new arrival Mark Messier.

== Regular season ==
The Canucks finished the regular season with the most power-play opportunities against, with 432. Although the Canucks allowed the most goals in the League, with 273, they scored the most short-handed goals, with 19.

=== All-Star Game ===

The 48th National Hockey League All-Star Game took place at General Motors Place in Vancouver, British Columbia, home to the Vancouver Canucks, on January 18, 1998.

==== The International Showdown ====
The 48th game was held in the very same year as the 1998 Winter Olympics in Nagano, providing the NHL to show its players from all over the world. To this extent, the NHL had the All-Star teams consist of a team of North Americans playing against a team of stars from the rest of the world. The format change also helped to intensify the game, as national pride would also become a factor. These provisions only applied to the players — coaches would still be selected based on which teams were the best from each conference at the time of the break.

=== Final standings ===
Pacific Division
No.	CR		GP	W	L	T	GF	GA	Pts
1	2	**Colorado Avalanche**	82	39	26	17	231	205	95
2	5	**Los Angeles Kings**	82	38	33	11	227	225	87
3	7	**Edmonton Oilers**	82	35	37	10	215	224	80
4	8	**San Jose Sharks**	82	34	38	10	210	216	78
5	11	Calgary Flames	82	26	41	15	217	252	67
6	12	Mighty Ducks of Anaheim	82	26	43	13	205	261	65
7	13	Vancouver Canucks	82	25	43	14	224	273	64

Note: CR = Conference rank; GP = Games played; W = Wins; L = Losses; T = Ties; GF = Goals for; GA = Goals against; Pts = Points
Bolded teams qualified for the playoffs.

Western Conference
R		Div	GP	W	L	T	GF	GA	Pts
**1**	**p – Dallas Stars**	**CEN**	**82**	**49**	**22**	**11**	**242**	**167**	**109**
**2**	**x – Colorado Avalanche**	**PAC**	**82**	**39**	**26**	**17**	**231**	**205**	**95**
**3**	**Detroit Red Wings**	**CEN**	**82**	**44**	**23**	**15**	**250**	**196**	**103**
**4**	**St. Louis Blues**	**CEN**	**82**	**45**	**29**	**8**	**256**	**204**	**98**
**5**	**Los Angeles Kings**	**PAC**	**82**	**38**	**33**	**11**	**227**	**225**	**87**
**6**	**Phoenix Coyotes**	**CEN**	**82**	**35**	**35**	**12**	**224**	**227**	**82**
**7**	**Edmonton Oilers**	**PAC**	**82**	**35**	**37**	**10**	**215**	**224**	**80**
**8**	**San Jose Sharks**	**PAC**	**82**	**34**	**38**	**10**	**210**	**216**	**78**
9	Chicago Blackhawks	CEN	82	30	39	13	192	199	73
10	Toronto Maple Leafs	CEN	82	30	43	9	194	237	69
11	Calgary Flames	PAC	82	26	41	15	217	252	67
12	Mighty Ducks of Anaheim	PAC	82	26	43	13	205	261	65
13	Vancouver Canucks	PAC	82	25	43	14	224	273	64

Divisions: CEN – Central, PAC – Pacific

bold – Qualified for playoffs; x – Won Division; p – Won Presidents' Trophy

== Schedule and results ==
1997–98 regular season
October: 3–8–2 (home: 2–4–2; road: 1–4–0)

Game	Date	Score	Opponent	Record	Recap
1^{[a]}	October 3, 1997	3–2	Mighty Ducks of Anaheim (1997–98)	1–0–0	W
2^{[a]}	October 4, 1997	2–3	@ Mighty Ducks of Anaheim (1997–98)	1–1–0	L
3	October 9, 1997	2–2 OT	Toronto Maple Leafs (1997–98)	1–1–1	T
4	October 11, 1997	3–6	New York Rangers (1997–98)	1–2–1	L
5	October 13, 1997	3–0	Edmonton Oilers (1997–98)	2–2–1	W
6	October 17, 1997	0–2	Boston Bruins (1997–98)	2–3–1	L
7	October 19, 1997	4–4 OT	Colorado Avalanche (1997–98)	2–3–2	T
8	October 21, 1997	5–1	@ Dallas Stars (1997–98)	3–3–2	W
9	October 23, 1997	1–4	@ St. Louis Blues (1997–98)	3–4–2	L
10	October 25, 1997	2–3 OT	Pittsburgh Penguins (1997–98)	3–5–2	L
11	October 26, 1997	1–5	Detroit Red Wings (1997–98)	3–6–2	L
12	October 29, 1997	0–3	@ Chicago Blackhawks (1997–98)	3–7–2	L
13	October 30, 1997	1–8	@ New Jersey Devils (1997–98)	3–8–2	L
Notes:^{a} At Yoyogi National Gymnasium in Tokyo, Japan

November: 6–6–1 (home: 2–2–0; road: 4–4–1)

Game	Date	Score	Opponent	Record	Recap
14	November 1, 1997	6–7 OT	@ Pittsburgh Penguins (1997–98)	3–9–2	L
15	November 3, 1997	3–5	@ Carolina Hurricanes (1997–98)	3–10–2	L
16	November 4, 1997	1–2	@ Washington Capitals (1997–98)	3–11–2	L
17	November 8, 1997	2–3	Mighty Ducks of Anaheim (1997–98)	3–12–2	L
18	November 11, 1997	2–8	@ Los Angeles Kings (1997–98)	3–13–2	L
19	November 12, 1997	5–2	@ San Jose Sharks (1997–98)	4–13–2	W
20	November 14, 1997	3–3 OT	@ Mighty Ducks of Anaheim (1997–98)	4–13–3	T
21	November 16, 1997	4–1	Carolina Hurricanes (1997–98)	5–13–3	W
22	November 20, 1997	4–2	Phoenix Coyotes (1997–98)	6–13–3	W
23	November 22, 1997	4–5 OT	Chicago Blackhawks (1997–98)	6–14–3	L
24	November 25, 1997	4–2	@ New York Rangers (1997–98)	7–14–3	W
25	November 28, 1997	5–2	@ Boston Bruins (1997–98)	8–14–3	W
26	November 29, 1997	4–2	@ Toronto Maple Leafs (1997–98)	9–14–3	W

December: 2–9–3 (home: 1–5–1; road: 1–4–2)

Game	Date	Score	Opponent	Record	Recap
27	December 1, 1997	3–3 OT	Detroit Red Wings (1997–98)	9–14–4	T
28	December 4, 1997	2–3	San Jose Sharks (1997–98)	9–15–4	L
29	December 6, 1997	4–6	@ Colorado Avalanche (1997–98)	9–16–4	L
30	December 8, 1997	1–5	@ St. Louis Blues (1997–98)	9–17–4	L
31	December 9, 1997	5–7	@ Detroit Red Wings (1997–98)	9–18–4	L
32	December 13, 1997	2–5	Colorado Avalanche (1997–98)	9–19–4	L
33	December 15, 1997	7–0	Los Angeles Kings (1997–98)	10–19–4	W
34	December 17, 1997	5–1	@ Phoenix Coyotes (1997–98)	11–19–4	W
35	December 18, 1997	0–0 OT	@ San Jose Sharks (1997–98)	11–19–5	T
36	December 20, 1997	0–5	Chicago Blackhawks (1997–98)	11–20–5	L
37	December 23, 1997	1–3	Dallas Stars (1997–98)	11–21–5	L
38	December 27, 1997	3–3 OT	@ Dallas Stars (1997–98)	11–21–6	T
39	December 29, 1997	2–5	@ Los Angeles Kings (1997–98)	11–22–6	L
40	December 31, 1997	0–8	Philadelphia Flyers (1997–98)	11–23–6	L

January: 3–9–2 (home: 2–3–1; road: 1–6–1)

Game	Date	Score	Opponent	Record	Recap
41	January 3, 1998	2–4	Montreal Canadiens (1997–98)	11–24–6	L
42	January 5, 1998	3–2	Los Angeles Kings (1997–98)	12–24–6	W
43	January 7, 1998	2–3	St. Louis Blues (1997–98)	12–25–6	L
44	January 8, 1998	4–4 OT	@ Colorado Avalanche (1997–98)	12–25–7	T
45	January 10, 1998	2–2 OT	Florida Panthers (1997–98)	12–25–8	T
46	January 12, 1998	2–3	@ Chicago Blackhawks (1997–98)	12–26–8	L
47	January 14, 1998	0–4	@ Detroit Red Wings (1997–98)	12–27–8	L
48	January 15, 1998	2–6	@ Buffalo Sabres (1997–98)	12–28–8	L
49	January 21, 1998	1–6	Phoenix Coyotes (1997–98)	12–29–8	L
50	January 24, 1998	2–5	@ Calgary Flames (1997–98)	12–30–8	L
51	January 26, 1998	2–4	@ Phoenix Coyotes (1997–98)	12–31–8	L
52	January 28, 1998	1–6	@ Colorado Avalanche (1997–98)	12–32–8	L
53	January 30, 1998	3–1	New Jersey Devils (1997–98)	13–32–8	W
54	January 31, 1998	6–3	@ Edmonton Oilers (1997–98)	14–32–8	W

February: 4–1–1 (home: 4–1–0; road: 0–0–1)

Game	Date	Score	Opponent	Record	Recap
55	February 2, 1998	1–2	Colorado Avalanche (1997–98)	14–33–8	L
56	February 6, 1998	5–4	Edmonton Oilers (1997–98)	15–33–8	W
57	February 7, 1998	6–3	San Jose Sharks (1997–98)	16–33–8	W
58	February 25, 1998	5–2	Mighty Ducks of Anaheim (1997–98)	17–33–8	W
59	February 27, 1998	4–4 OT	@ Calgary Flames (1997–98)	17–33–9	T
60	February 28, 1998	6–4	Ottawa Senators (1997–98)	18–33–9	W

March: 4–6–4 (home: 2–4–0; road: 2–2–4)

Game	Date	Score	Opponent	Record	Recap
61	March 2, 1998	2–2 OT	@ Los Angeles Kings (1997–98)	18–33–10	T
62	March 5, 1998	2–6	Calgary Flames (1997–98)	18–34–10	L
63	March 7, 1998	5–2	Tampa Bay Lightning (1997–98)	19–34–10	W
64	March 9, 1998	0–4	St. Louis Blues (1997–98)	19–35–10	L
65	March 11, 1998	2–2 OT	@ Montreal Canadiens (1997–98)	19–35–11	T
66	March 12, 1998	2–3	@ Philadelphia Flyers (1997–98)	19–36–11	L
67	March 14, 1998	6–2	@ New York Islanders (1997–98)	20–36–11	W
68	March 17, 1998	4–2	@ Florida Panthers (1997–98)	21–36–11	W
69	March 18, 1998	2–4	@ Tampa Bay Lightning (1997–98)	21–37–11	L
70	March 20, 1998	1–1 OT	@ Ottawa Senators (1997–98)	21–37–12	T
71	March 21, 1998	1–1 OT	@ Toronto Maple Leafs (1997–98)	21–37–13	T
72	March 24, 1998	4–3	New York Islanders (1997–98)	22–37–13	W
73	March 26, 1998	2–5	Buffalo Sabres (1997–98)	22–38–13	L
74	March 28, 1998	2–3	Washington Capitals (1997–98)	22–39–13	L

April: 3–4–1 (home: 2–3–0; road: 1–1–1)

Game	Date	Score	Opponent	Record	Recap
75	April 1, 1998	4–2	Edmonton Oilers (1997–98)	23–39–13	W
76	April 4, 1998	5–3	Dallas Stars (1997–98)	24–39–13	W
77	April 6, 1998	2–3	@ Edmonton Oilers (1997–98)	24–40–13	L
78	April 9, 1998	6–3	@ Calgary Flames (1997–98)	25–40–13	W
79	April 11, 1998	1–1 OT	@ San Jose Sharks (1997–98)	25–40–14	T
80	April 15, 1998	0–2	Los Angeles Kings (1997–98)	25–41–14	L
81	April 17, 1998	2–4	Calgary Flames (1997–98)	25–42–14	L
82	April 19, 1998	1–2	Toronto Maple Leafs (1997–98)	25–43–14	L

Legend: W Win (2 points) L Loss (0 points) T Tie (1 point)

== Player statistics ==
=== Scoring ===
- Position abbreviations: C = Centre; D = Defence; G = Goaltender; LW = Left wing; RW = Right wing
- † = Joined team via a transaction (e.g., trade, waivers, signing) during the season. Stats reflect time with the Canucks only.
- ‡ = Left team via a transaction (e.g., trade, waivers, release) during the season. Stats reflect time with the Canucks only.

No.	Player	Pos	Regular season					
No.	Player	Pos	GP	G	A	Pts	+/-	PIM
10	Pavel Bure	RW	82	51	39	90	5	48
11	Mark Messier	C	82	22	38	60	−10	58
89	Alexander Mogilny	RW	51	18	27	45	−6	36
19	Markus Naslund	LW	76	14	20	34	5	56
21	Jyrki Lumme	D	74	9	21	30	−25	34
2	Mattias Ohlund	D	77	7	23	30	3	76
3	Bret Hedican	D	71	3	24	27	3	79
28	Brian Noonan	RW	82	10	15	25	−19	62
20	Dave Scatchard	C	76	13	11	24	−4	165
16	Trevor Linden‡	RW	42	7	14	21	−13	49
26	Mike Sillinger‡	C	48	10	9	19	−14	34
8	Donald Brashear	LW	77	9	9	18	−9	372
22	Peter Zezel†	C	25	5	12	17	13	2
27	Todd Bertuzzi†	LW	22	6	9	15	2	63
4	Grant Ledyard‡	D	39	2	13	15	−2	14
24	Scott Walker	C	59	3	10	13	−8	164
9	Brad May†	LW	27	9	3	12	0	41
23	Bryan McCabe†	D	26	1	11	12	10	64
44	Dave Babych‡	D	47	0	9	9	−11	37
23	Martin Gelinas‡	LW	24	4	4	8	−6	10
5	Dana Murzyn	D	31	5	2	7	−3	42
25	Steve Staios	RW	77	3	4	7	−3	134
6	Adrian Aucoin	D	35	3	3	6	−4	21
48	Bert Robertsson	LW	30	2	4	6	2	24
29	Gino Odjick‡	LW	35	3	2	5	−3	181
14	Lonny Bohonos‡	RW	31	2	1	3	−9	4
36	Chris McAllister	D	36	1	2	3	−12	106
18	Geoff Sanderson†‡	LW	9	0	3	3	−1	4
7	David Roberts	LW	13	1	1	2	−1	4
9	Lubomir Vaic	C	5	1	1	2	−2	2
26	Brandon Convery†	C	7	0	2	2	0	0
1	Sean Burke†‡	G	16	0	1	1		14
39	Enrico Ciccone†‡	D	13	0	1	1	−2	47
7	Jamie Huscroft†	D	7	0	1	1	2	0
34	Jason Strudwick†	D	11	0	1	1	−3	29
22	Larry Courville	LW	11	0	0	0	−7	5
31	Corey Hirsch	G	1	0	0	0		0
32	Arturs Irbe	G	41	0	0	0		2
1	Kirk McLean‡	G	29	0	0	0		0
30	Garth Snow†	G	12	0	0	0		4
27	Mark Wotton	D	5	0	0	0	−2	6

=== Goaltending ===
- † = Joined team via a transaction (e.g., trade, waivers, signing) during the season. Stats reflect time with the Canucks only.
- ‡ = Left team via a transaction (e.g., trade, waivers, release) during the season. Stats reflect time with the Canucks only.

No.	Player	Regular season									
No.	Player	GP	W	L	T	SA	GA	GAA	SV%	SO	TOI
32	Arturs Irbe	41	14	11	6	982	91	2.73	.907	2	1999
1	Kirk McLean‡	29	6	17	4	800	97	3.68	.879	1	1583
30	Garth Snow†	12	3	6	0	262	26	3.09	.901	0	504
1	Sean Burke†‡	16	2	9	4	396	49	3.51	.876	0	838
31	Corey Hirsch	1	0	0	0	34	5	6.05	.853	0	50

== Awards and records ==
=== Awards ===
Type	Award/honour	Recipient	Ref
League (annual)	NHL All-Rookie Team	Mattias Ohlund (Defence)	
League (in-season)	NHL All-Star Game selection	Pavel Bure	
League (in-season)	NHL All-Star Game selection	Mark Messier (Note: Commissioner’s selection.)	
Team	Babe Pratt Trophy	Mattias Ohlund	
Team	Cyclone Taylor Trophy	Pavel Bure	
Team	Cyrus H. McLean Trophy	Pavel Bure	
Team	Fred J. Hume Award	Brian Noonan	
Team	Molson Cup	Pavel Bure	
Team	Most Exciting Player Award	Pavel Bure	

=== Milestones ===
Milestone	Player	Date	Ref
First game	Mattias Ohlund	October 3, 1997	
First game	Dave Scatchard	October 3, 1997	
First game	Lubomir Vaic	October 30, 1997	
First game	Chris McAllister	November 1, 1997	
First game	Bert Robertsson	November 8, 1997	
500th game played	Kirk McLean	October 19, 1997	

== Transactions ==
=== Trades ===
January 2, 1998	To Vancouver Canucks Sean Burke; Geoff Sanderson; Enrico Ciccone	To Carolina Hurricanes Kirk McLean; Martin Gelinas
February 4, 1998	To Vancouver Canucks conditional 5th round pick in 1998 (Garrett Prosofsky)	To Philadelphia Flyers Mike Sillinger
February 4, 1998	To Vancouver Canucks Brad May; 3rd round pick in 1999	To Buffalo Sabres Geoff Sanderson
February 5, 1998	To Vancouver Canucks Peter Zezel	To New Jersey Devils 5th round pick in 1998 (Anton But)
February 6, 1998	To Vancouver Canucks Bryan McCabe; Todd Bertuzzi; 3rd round pick in 1999 (Jarkko Ruutu)	To New York Islanders Trevor Linden
March 3, 1998	To Vancouver Canucks 8th round pick in 1998 (Graig Mischler)	To Boston Bruins Grant Ledyard
March 4, 1998	To Vancouver Canucks Garth Snow	To Philadelphia Flyers Sean Burke
March 7, 1998	To Vancouver Canucks Brandon Convery	To Toronto Maple Leafs Lonny Bohonos
March 14, 1998	To Vancouver Canucks Jamie Huscroft	To Tampa Bay Lightning Enrico Ciccone
March 23, 1998	To Vancouver Canucks Jason Strudwick	To New York Islanders Gino Odjick
March 24, 1998	To Vancouver Canucks 3rd round pick in 1999 (Justin Morrison)	To Philadelphia Flyers Dave Babych; 6th round pick in 1998 (Antero Niittymaki)

== Draft picks ==
Vancouver's picks at the 1997 NHL entry draft in Pittsburgh, Pennsylvania.

Round	#	Player	Nationality	College/Junior/Club team
1	10	Brad Ference (D)	Canada	Spokane Chiefs (WHL)
2	34	Ryan Bonni (D)	Canada	Saskatoon Blades (WHL)
2	36	Harold Druken (D)	Canada	Detroit Whalers (OHL)
3	64	Kyle Freadrich (LW)	Canada	Prince George Cougars (WHL)
4	90	Chris Stanley (C)	Canada	Belleville Bulls (OHL)
5	114	David Darguzas (C)	Canada	Edmonton Ice (WHL)
5	117	Matt Cockell (G)	Canada	Saskatoon Blades (WHL)
6	144	Matt Cooke (LW)	Canada	Windsor Spitfires (OHL)
6	148	Larry Shapley (D)	Canada	Welland Jr. Canadians (Golden Horseshoe Junior B Hockey League)
7	171	Rod Leroux (D)	Canada	Seattle Thunderbirds (WHL)
8	201	Denis Martynyuk (LW)	Russia	CSKA Moscow (Russian Pro Hockey League)
9	227	Peter Brady (G)	Canada	Powell River Paper Kings (BCJHL)
