= 1997–98 San Jose Sharks season =

1997–98 San Jose Sharks
- Division: 4th Pacific
- Conference: 8th Western
- 1997–98 record: 34–38–10
- Home record: 17–19–5
- Road record: 17–19–5
- Goals for: 210
- Goals against: 216

Team information
- General manager: Dean Lombardi
- Coach: Darryl Sutter
- Captain: Todd Gill (Oct.–Mar.); Vacant (Mar.–Apr.)
- Arena: San Jose Arena
- Average attendance: 17,111
- Minor league affiliates: Kentucky Thoroughblades; Louisville RiverFrogs

Team leaders
- Goals: Jeff Friesen (31)
- Assists: Jeff Friesen (32)
- Points: Jeff Friesen (63)
- Penalty minutes: Owen Nolan (144)
- Plus/minus: Bill Houlder (+13)
- Wins: Mike Vernon (30)
- Goals against average: Mike Vernon (2.46)

The 1997–98 San Jose Sharks season was the Sharks' seventh season of operation in the National Hockey League (NHL). Following their second last-place finish in as many years, the Sharks unceremoniously fired first-year head coach Al Sims; he was replaced by Darryl Sutter, who had previously coached the Chicago Blackhawks. At the time of his hiring, Sutter was the first head coach in franchise history to have previously coached another NHL team.

The Sharks' coaching switch was accompanied by a handful of player acquisitions and debuts. Of these, the addition of five-time NHL All-Star goaltender Mike Vernon proved most important. On August 18, 1997, the Sharks acquired Vernon from the Detroit Red Wings for a pair of second-round picks; at the time of the trade, Vernon was only two months removed from backstopping the Red Wings to victory in the 1997 Stanley Cup Finals. Additionally, the Sharks drafted highly-touted forward Patrick Marleau with the second overall pick in the 1997 NHL entry draft. Despite a lackluster rookie season, Marleau would enjoy considerable success with the Sharks over the following two decades. Lastly, 1996 first-found pick Marco Sturm was added to the roster early in the season. Sturm and Marleau, in particular, supplemented a burgeoning collection of young forwards that already included mainstays Jeff Friesen and Owen Nolan.

In Sutter's first season at the helm, the Sharks' play improved substantially. While they once again failed to post a winning record, the team managed to clinch the Western Conference's eighth (and final) playoff berth. In the first round of the 1998 Stanley Cup Playoffs, the Sharks faced the top-seeded Dallas Stars. The Sharks quickly dropped their first two games in Dallas; upon returning to San Jose, however, the Sharks rallied to tie the series at two games apiece. An upset was not to be, however, as the Stars responded with a pair of one-goal victories to win the series in six games. Despite a quick exit from the playoffs, the 1997-98 season would prove to be a turning point for the franchise. After finishing with the Western Conference's worst record in four of their first six seasons of play, the Sharks would miss the postseason just twice between 1998 and 2019.

== Regular season ==
Captain Todd Gill was traded to the St. Louis Blues, in March.

=== Final standings ===
Pacific Division
| No. | CR | | GP | W | L | T | GF | GA | Pts |
|---|---|---|---|---|---|---|---|---|---|
| 1 | 2 | **Colorado Avalanche** | 82 | 39 | 26 | 17 | 231 | 205 | 95 |
| 2 | 5 | **Los Angeles Kings** | 82 | 38 | 33 | 11 | 227 | 225 | 87 |
| 3 | 7 | **Edmonton Oilers** | 82 | 35 | 37 | 10 | 215 | 224 | 80 |
| 4 | 8 | **San Jose Sharks** | 82 | 34 | 38 | 10 | 210 | 216 | 78 |
| 5 | 11 | Calgary Flames | 82 | 26 | 41 | 15 | 217 | 252 | 67 |
| 6 | 12 | Mighty Ducks of Anaheim | 82 | 26 | 43 | 13 | 205 | 261 | 65 |
| 7 | 13 | Vancouver Canucks | 82 | 25 | 43 | 14 | 224 | 273 | 64 |

Note: CR = Conference rank; GP = Games played; W = Wins; L = Losses; T = Ties; GF = Goals for; GA = Goals against; Pts = Points
Bolded teams qualified for the playoffs.

Western Conference
| R | | Div | GP | W | L | T | GF | GA | Pts |
|---|---|---|---|---|---|---|---|---|---|
| **1** | **p – Dallas Stars** | **CEN** | **82** | **49** | **22** | **11** | **242** | **167** | **109** |
| **2** | **x – Colorado Avalanche** | **PAC** | **82** | **39** | **26** | **17** | **231** | **205** | **95** |
| **3** | **Detroit Red Wings** | **CEN** | **82** | **44** | **23** | **15** | **250** | **196** | **103** |
| **4** | **St. Louis Blues** | **CEN** | **82** | **45** | **29** | **8** | **256** | **204** | **98** |
| **5** | **Los Angeles Kings** | **PAC** | **82** | **38** | **33** | **11** | **227** | **225** | **87** |
| **6** | **Phoenix Coyotes** | **CEN** | **82** | **35** | **35** | **12** | **224** | **227** | **82** |
| **7** | **Edmonton Oilers** | **PAC** | **82** | **35** | **37** | **10** | **215** | **224** | **80** |
| **8** | **San Jose Sharks** | **PAC** | **82** | **34** | **38** | **10** | **210** | **216** | **78** |
| 9 | Chicago Blackhawks | CEN | 82 | 30 | 39 | 13 | 192 | 199 | 73 |
| 10 | Toronto Maple Leafs | CEN | 82 | 30 | 43 | 9 | 194 | 237 | 69 |
| 11 | Calgary Flames | PAC | 82 | 26 | 41 | 15 | 217 | 252 | 67 |
| 12 | Mighty Ducks of Anaheim | PAC | 82 | 26 | 43 | 13 | 205 | 261 | 65 |
| 13 | Vancouver Canucks | PAC | 82 | 25 | 43 | 14 | 224 | 273 | 64 |

Divisions: CEN – Central, PAC – Pacific

bold – Qualified for playoffs; x – Won Division; p – Won Presidents' Trophy

== Playoffs ==
In a Conference Quarterfinals series, the Sharks met the #1 seeded and Presidents' Trophy-winning Dallas Stars. The Sharks were eliminated by the Stars in six games.

== Schedule and results ==
=== Regular season ===
1997–98 regular season
October: 4–9–0 (home: 2–5–0; road: 2–4–0)

| Game | Date | Score | Opponent | Record | Recap |
|---|---|---|---|---|---|
| 1 | October 1, 1997 | 3–5 | Edmonton Oilers (1997–98) | 0–1–0 | L |
| 2 | October 4, 1997 | 3–2 | Chicago Blackhawks (1997–98) | 1–1–0 | W |
| 3 | October 7, 1997 | 0–1 | Ottawa Senators (1997–98) | 1–2–0 | L |
| 4 | October 9, 1997 | 2–3 | @ Colorado Avalanche (1997–98) | 1–3–0 | L |
| 5 | October 11, 1997 | 5–2 | Boston Bruins (1997–98) | 2–3–0 | W |
| 6 | October 13, 1997 | 2–3 OT | Philadelphia Flyers (1997–98) | 2–4–0 | L |
| 7 | October 16, 1997 | 2–5 | New York Islanders (1997–98) | 2–5–0 | L |
| 8 | October 19, 1997 | 3–5 | @ Phoenix Coyotes (1997–98) | 2–6–0 | L |
| 9 | October 22, 1997 | 2–5 | Pittsburgh Penguins (1997–98) | 2–7–0 | L |
| 10 | October 25, 1997 | 4–3 | @ New Jersey Devils (1997–98) | 3–7–0 | W |
| 11 | October 27, 1997 | 2–1 | @ New York Islanders (1997–98) | 4–7–0 | W |
| 12 | October 29, 1997 | 3–4 | @ Detroit Red Wings (1997–98) | 4–8–0 | L |
| 13 | October 31, 1997 | 3–5 | @ Chicago Blackhawks (1997–98) | 4–9–0 | L |

November: 5–8–2 (home: 2–4–1; road: 3–4–1)

| Game | Date | Score | Opponent | Record | Recap |
|---|---|---|---|---|---|
| 14 | November 1, 1997 | 0–2 | @ St. Louis Blues (1997–98) | 4–10–0 | L |
| 15 | November 4, 1997 | 0–0 OT | Toronto Maple Leafs (1997–98) | 4–10–1 | T |
| 16 | November 7, 1997 | 3–4 | Montreal Canadiens (1997–98) | 4–11–1 | L |
| 17 | November 8, 1997 | 3–1 | Tampa Bay Lightning (1997–98) | 5–11–1 | W |
| 18 | November 10, 1997 | 6–4 | @ Mighty Ducks of Anaheim (1997–98) | 6–11–1 | W |
| 19 | November 12, 1997 | 2–5 | Vancouver Canucks (1997–98) | 6–12–1 | L |
| 20 | November 13, 1997 | 3–6 | @ Los Angeles Kings (1997–98) | 6–13–1 | L |
| 21 | November 15, 1997 | 2–3 | Phoenix Coyotes (1997–98) | 6–14–1 | L |
| 22 | November 18, 1997 | 4–2 | Mighty Ducks of Anaheim (1997–98) | 7–14–1 | W |
| 23 | November 20, 1997 | 3–0 | @ Philadelphia Flyers (1997–98) | 8–14–1 | W |
| 24 | November 22, 1997 | 5–2 | @ Washington Capitals (1997–98) | 9–14–1 | W |
| 25 | November 24, 1997 | 2–2 OT | @ Montreal Canadiens (1997–98) | 9–14–2 | T |
| 26 | November 25, 1997 | 1–3 | @ Toronto Maple Leafs (1997–98) | 9–15–2 | L |
| 27 | November 28, 1997 | 2–4 | New Jersey Devils (1997–98) | 9–16–2 | L |
| 28 | November 30, 1997 | 1–6 | @ Edmonton Oilers (1997–98) | 9–17–2 | L |

December: 5–3–3 (home: 1–1–2; road: 4–2–1)

| Game | Date | Score | Opponent | Record | Recap |
|---|---|---|---|---|---|
| 29 | December 1, 1997 | 2–3 OT | @ Calgary Flames (1997–98) | 9–18–2 | L |
| 30 | December 4, 1997 | 3–2 | @ Vancouver Canucks (1997–98) | 10–18–2 | W |
| 31 | December 10, 1997 | 3–3 OT | Washington Capitals (1997–98) | 10–18–3 | T |
| 32 | December 12, 1997 | 1–0 | @ Dallas Stars (1997–98) | 11–18–3 | W |
| 33 | December 14, 1997 | 2–1 | @ Chicago Blackhawks (1997–98) | 12–18–3 | W |
| 34 | December 16, 1997 | 5–1 | Detroit Red Wings (1997–98) | 13–18–3 | W |
| 35 | December 18, 1997 | 0–0 OT | Vancouver Canucks (1997–98) | 13–18–4 | T |
| 36 | December 21, 1997 | 4–2 | @ Mighty Ducks of Anaheim (1997–98) | 14–18–4 | W |
| 37 | December 26, 1997 | 0–4 | Phoenix Coyotes (1997–98) | 14–19–4 | L |
| 38 | December 29, 1997 | 1–2 | @ Tampa Bay Lightning (1997–98) | 14–20–4 | L |
| 39 | December 30, 1997 | 2–2 OT | @ Florida Panthers (1997–98) | 14–20–5 | T |

January: 6–5–2 (home: 5–4–1; road: 1–1–1)

| Game | Date | Score | Opponent | Record | Recap |
|---|---|---|---|---|---|
| 40 | January 2, 1998 | 4–1 | @ Detroit Red Wings (1997–98) | 15–20–5 | W |
| 41 | January 3, 1998 | 0–3 | @ Boston Bruins (1997–98) | 15–21–5 | L |
| 42 | January 6, 1998 | 1–5 | St. Louis Blues (1997–98) | 15–22–5 | L |
| 43 | January 10, 1998 | 5–2 | Buffalo Sabres (1997–98) | 16–22–5 | W |
| 44 | January 12, 1998 | 1–3 | Dallas Stars (1997–98) | 16–23–5 | L |
| 45 | January 14, 1998 | 2–4 | Los Angeles Kings (1997–98) | 16–24–5 | L |
| 46 | January 15, 1998 | 2–2 OT | @ Colorado Avalanche (1997–98) | 16–24–6 | T |
| 47 | January 21, 1998 | 7–1 | Calgary Flames (1997–98) | 17–24–6 | W |
| 48 | January 23, 1998 | 3–2 | Edmonton Oilers (1997–98) | 18–24–6 | W |
| 49 | January 24, 1998 | 1–1 OT | Florida Panthers (1997–98) | 18–24–7 | T |
| 50 | January 27, 1998 | 4–2 | Mighty Ducks of Anaheim (1997–98) | 19–24–7 | W |
| 51 | January 29, 1998 | 0–3 | Chicago Blackhawks (1997–98) | 19–25–7 | L |
| 52 | January 31, 1998 | 5–2 | Colorado Avalanche (1997–98) | 20–25–7 | W |

February: 2–4–0 (home: 1–1–0; road: 1–3–0)

| Game | Date | Score | Opponent | Record | Recap |
|---|---|---|---|---|---|
| 53 | February 2, 1998 | 2–3 | New York Rangers (1997–98) | 20–26–7 | L |
| 54 | February 4, 1998 | 3–0 | @ Edmonton Oilers (1997–98) | 21–26–7 | W |
| 55 | February 5, 1998 | 2–4 | @ Calgary Flames (1997–98) | 21–27–7 | L |
| 56 | February 7, 1998 | 3–6 | @ Vancouver Canucks (1997–98) | 21–28–7 | L |
| 57 | February 26, 1998 | 3–1 | St. Louis Blues (1997–98) | 22–28–7 | W |
| 58 | February 28, 1998 | 1–4 | @ Edmonton Oilers (1997–98) | 22–29–7 | L |

March: 7–8–0 (home: 3–4–0; road: 4–4–0)

| Game | Date | Score | Opponent | Record | Recap |
|---|---|---|---|---|---|
| 59 | March 2, 1998 | 1–3 | Carolina Hurricanes (1997–98) | 22–30–7 | L |
| 60 | March 5, 1998 | 5–4 | Detroit Red Wings (1997–98) | 23–30–7 | W |
| 61 | March 6, 1998 | 3–0 | @ Mighty Ducks of Anaheim (1997–98) | 24–30–7 | W |
| 62 | March 9, 1998 | 3–2 | Toronto Maple Leafs (1997–98) | 25–30–7 | W |
| 63 | March 11, 1998 | 3–5 | @ New York Rangers (1997–98) | 25–31–7 | L |
| 64 | March 12, 1998 | 1–3 | @ Buffalo Sabres (1997–98) | 25–32–7 | L |
| 65 | March 14, 1998 | 2–1 | @ Carolina Hurricanes (1997–98) | 26–32–7 | W |
| 66 | March 16, 1998 | 2–1 | Los Angeles Kings (1997–98) | 27–32–7 | W |
| 67 | March 18, 1998 | 1–3 | Dallas Stars (1997–98) | 27–33–7 | L |
| 68 | March 21, 1998 | 0–2 | Colorado Avalanche (1997–98) | 27–34–7 | L |
| 69 | March 22, 1998 | 1–3 | @ Phoenix Coyotes (1997–98) | 27–35–7 | L |
| 70 | March 24, 1998 | 3–4 | Los Angeles Kings (1997–98) | 27–36–7 | L |
| 71 | March 26, 1998 | 5–2 | @ Los Angeles Kings (1997–98) | 28–36–7 | W |
| 72 | March 28, 1998 | 4–1 | @ Dallas Stars (1997–98) | 29–36–7 | W |
| 73 | March 30, 1998 | 2–6 | @ St. Louis Blues (1997–98) | 29–37–7 | L |

April: 5–1–3 (home: 3–0–1; road: 2–1–2)

| Game | Date | Score | Opponent | Record | Recap |
|---|---|---|---|---|---|
| 74 | April 1, 1998 | 3–2 | @ Pittsburgh Penguins (1997–98) | 30–37–7 | W |
| 75 | April 2, 1998 | 3–3 OT | @ Ottawa Senators (1997–98) | 30–37–8 | T |
| 76 | April 4, 1998 | 5–3 | @ Toronto Maple Leafs (1997–98) | 31–37–8 | W |
| 77 | April 7, 1998 | 6–0 | Calgary Flames (1997–98) | 32–37–8 | W |
| 78 | April 9, 1998 | 5–2 | Mighty Ducks of Anaheim (1997–98) | 33–37–8 | W |
| 79 | April 11, 1998 | 1–1 OT | Vancouver Canucks (1997–98) | 33–37–9 | T |
| 80 | April 15, 1998 | 3–3 OT | @ Calgary Flames (1997–98) | 33–37–10 | T |
| 81 | April 16, 1998 | 1–4 | @ Colorado Avalanche (1997–98) | 33–38–10 | L |
| 82 | April 18, 1998 | 4–1 | Calgary Flames (1997–98) | 34–38–10 | W |

Legend: W Win (2 points) L Loss (0 points) T Tie (1 point)

=== Playoffs ===
1998 Stanley Cup playoffs
Western Conference Quarterfinals vs. (1) Dallas Stars – Stars win 4–2

| Game | Date | Score | Opponent | Series | Recap |
|---|---|---|---|---|---|
| 1 | April 22, 1998 | 1–4 | @ Dallas Stars | Stars lead 1–0 | L |
| 2 | April 24, 1998 | 2–5 | @ Dallas Stars | Stars lead 2–0 | L |
| 3 | April 26, 1998 | 4–1 | Dallas Stars | Stars lead 2–1 | W |
| 4 | April 28, 1998 | 1–0 OT | Dallas Stars | Series tied 2–2 | W |
| 5 | April 30, 1998 | 2–3 | @ Dallas Stars | Stars lead 3–2 | L |
| 6 | May 2, 1998 | 2–3 OT | Dallas Stars | Stars win 4–2 | L |

Legend: W Win L Loss

== Player statistics ==
=== Scoring ===
- Position abbreviations: C = Center; D = Defense; G = Goaltender; LW = Left wing; RW = Right wing
- † = Joined team via a transaction (e.g., trade, waivers, signing) during the season. Stats reflect time with the Sharks only.
- ‡ = Left team via a transaction (e.g., trade, waivers, release) during the season. Stats reflect time with the Sharks only.

| No. | Player | Pos | Regular season | | | | | | Playoffs | | | | | |
| No. | Player | Pos | GP | G | A | Pts | +/- | PIM | GP | G | A | Pts | +/- | PIM |
|---|---|---|---|---|---|---|---|---|---|---|---|---|---|---|
| 39 | Jeff Friesen | LW | 79 | 31 | 32 | 63 | 8 | 40 | 6 | 0 | 1 | 1 | −1 | 2 |
| 11 | Owen Nolan | RW | 75 | 14 | 27 | 41 | −2 | 144 | 6 | 2 | 2 | 4 | −1 | 26 |
| 15 | John MacLean† | RW | 51 | 13 | 19 | 32 | 0 | 28 | 6 | 2 | 3 | 5 | 1 | 4 |
| 14 | Patrick Marleau | C | 74 | 13 | 19 | 32 | 5 | 14 | 5 | 0 | 1 | 1 | −1 | 0 |
| 2 | Bill Houlder | D | 82 | 7 | 25 | 32 | 13 | 48 | 6 | 1 | 2 | 3 | 0 | 2 |
| 19 | Marco Sturm | LW | 74 | 10 | 20 | 30 | −2 | 40 | 2 | 0 | 0 | 0 | −2 | 0 |
| 37 | Stephane Matteau | LW | 73 | 15 | 14 | 29 | 4 | 60 | 4 | 0 | 1 | 1 | 1 | 0 |
| 22 | Murray Craven | LW | 67 | 12 | 17 | 29 | 4 | 25 | 6 | 1 | 1 | 2 | −2 | 0 |
| 9 | Bernie Nicholls | C | 60 | 6 | 22 | 28 | −4 | 26 | 6 | 0 | 5 | 5 | −2 | 8 |
| 21 | Tony Granato | RW | 59 | 16 | 9 | 25 | 3 | 70 | 1 | 0 | 0 | 0 | 0 | 0 |
| 10 | Marcus Ragnarsson | D | 79 | 5 | 20 | 25 | −11 | 65 | 6 | 0 | 0 | 0 | 2 | 4 |
| 18 | Mike Ricci† | C | 59 | 9 | 14 | 23 | −4 | 30 | 6 | 1 | 3 | 4 | 0 | 6 |
| 23 | Todd Gill‡ | D | 64 | 8 | 13 | 21 | −13 | 31 | — | — | — | — | — | — |
| 40 | Mike Rathje | D | 81 | 3 | 12 | 15 | −4 | 59 | 6 | 1 | 0 | 1 | −3 | 6 |
| 20 | Andrei Zyuzin | D | 56 | 6 | 7 | 13 | 8 | 66 | 6 | 1 | 0 | 1 | −2 | 14 |
| 28 | Shawn Burr | LW | 42 | 6 | 6 | 12 | 2 | 50 | 6 | 0 | 0 | 0 | −1 | 8 |
| 33 | Marty McSorley | D | 56 | 2 | 10 | 12 | 10 | 140 | — | — | — | — | — | — |
| 3 | Doug Bodger‡ | D | 28 | 4 | 6 | 10 | 0 | 32 | — | — | — | — | — | — |
| 8 | Jarrod Skalde‡†‡† | C | 22 | 4 | 6 | 10 | −2 | 14 | — | — | — | — | — | — |
| 17 | Joe Murphy† | RW | 10 | 5 | 4 | 9 | 1 | 14 | 6 | 1 | 1 | 2 | −1 | 20 |
| 43 | Al Iafrate | D | 21 | 2 | 7 | 9 | −1 | 28 | 6 | 1 | 0 | 1 | −4 | 10 |
| 12 | Ron Sutter | C | 57 | 2 | 7 | 9 | −2 | 22 | 6 | 1 | 0 | 1 | −1 | 14 |
| 26 (Note: Lowry wore number 15 until MacLean was acquired.) | Dave Lowry† | LW | 50 | 4 | 4 | 8 | 0 | 51 | 6 | 0 | 0 | 0 | 0 | 18 |
| 25 | Viktor Kozlov‡ | C | 18 | 5 | 2 | 7 | −2 | 2 | — | — | — | — | — | — |
| 42 | Shean Donovan‡ | RW | 20 | 3 | 3 | 6 | 3 | 22 | — | — | — | — | — | — |
| 27 | Alexander Korolyuk | LW | 19 | 2 | 3 | 5 | −5 | 6 | — | — | — | — | — | — |
| 7 | Rich Brennan‡ | D | 11 | 1 | 2 | 3 | −4 | 2 | — | — | — | — | — | — |
| 27 | Bryan Marchment† | D | 12 | 0 | 3 | 3 | 2 | 43 | 6 | 0 | 0 | 0 | 1 | 10 |
| 17 | Steve Guolla | C | 7 | 1 | 1 | 2 | −2 | 0 | — | — | — | — | — | — |
| 62 | Andrei Nazarov‡ | LW | 40 | 1 | 1 | 2 | −4 | 112 | — | — | — | — | — | — |
| 29 | Mike Vernon | G | 62 | 0 | 2 | 2 | | 24 | 6 | 0 | 0 | 0 | | 0 |
| 24 | Barry Potomski | LW | 9 | 0 | 1 | 1 | 1 | 30 | — | — | — | — | — | — |
| 34 | Niklas Andersson | LW | 5 | 0 | 0 | 0 | −1 | 2 | — | — | — | — | — | — |
| 32 | Kelly Hrudey | G | 28 | 0 | 0 | 0 | | 2 | 1 | 0 | 0 | 0 | | 0 |
| 30 | Jason Muzzatti† | G | 1 | 0 | 0 | 0 | | 0 | — | — | — | — | — | — |
| 5 | Ken Sutton† | D | 8 | 0 | 0 | 0 | −4 | 15 | — | — | — | — | — | — |
| 16 | Dody Wood‡ | C | 8 | 0 | 0 | 0 | −3 | 40 | — | — | — | — | — | — |

=== Goaltending ===
- † = Joined team via a transaction (e.g., trade, waivers, signing) during the season. Stats reflect time with the Sharks only.

| No. | Player | Regular season | | | | | | | | | | Playoffs | | | | | | | | |
| No. | Player | GP | W | L | T | SA | GA | GAA | SV% | SO | TOI | GP | W | L | SA | GA | GAA | SV% | SO | TOI |
|---|---|---|---|---|---|---|---|---|---|---|---|---|---|---|---|---|---|---|---|---|
| 29 | Mike Vernon | 62 | 30 | 22 | 8 | 1401 | 146 | 2.46 | .896 | 5 | 3564 | 6 | 2 | 4 | 138 | 14 | 2.41 | .899 | 1 | 348 |
| 32 | Kelly Hrudey | 28 | 4 | 16 | 2 | 600 | 62 | 2.73 | .897 | 1 | 1360 | 1 | 0 | 0 | 6 | 1 | 3.00 | .833 | 0 | 20 |
| 30 | Jason Muzzatti† | 1 | 0 | 0 | 0 | 13 | 2 | 4.49 | .846 | 0 | 27 | — | — | — | — | — | — | — | — | — |

== Awards and records ==
=== Awards ===
| Type | Award/honor | Recipient | Ref |
|---|---|---|---|
| League (in-season) | NHL Rookie of the Month | Marco Sturm (November) | |
| Team | Sharks Player of the Year | Mike Vernon | |
| Team | Sharks Rookie of the Year | Patrick Marleau | |
| Team | Sharks Rookie of the Year | Marco Sturm | |
| Team | Sharks Rookie of the Year | Andrei Zyuzin | |

=== Milestones ===
| Milestone | Player | Date | Ref |
|---|---|---|---|
| First game | Patrick Marleau | October 1, 1997 | |
| First game | Alexander Korolyuk | October 4, 1997 | |
| First game | Marco Sturm | October 4, 1997 | |
| First game | Andrei Zyuzin | October 7, 1997 | |
| 1,000th game played | Murray Craven | March 30, 1998 | |

== Draft picks ==
San Jose's picks at the 1997 NHL entry draft in Pittsburgh, Pennsylvania.

| Round | # | Player | Position | Nationality | College/Junior/Club team |
|---|---|---|---|---|---|
| 1 | 2 | Patrick Marleau | Center | Canada | Seattle Thunderbirds |
| 1 | 23 | Scott Hannan | Defense | Canada | Kelowna Rockets |
| 4 | 82 | Adam Colagiacomo | Right wing | Canada | Oshawa Generals |
| 5 | 107 | Adam Spylo | Right wing | Canada | Erie Otters |
| 7 | 163 | Joe Dusbabek | Right wing | United States | Notre Dame |
| 8 | 192 | Cam Severson | Left wing | Canada | Prince Albert Raiders |
| 9 | 219 | Mark Smith | Center | Canada | Lethbridge Hurricanes |

== See also ==
- 1997–98 NHL season
