= 1997–98 Florida Panthers season =

National Hockey League team season

1997–98 Florida Panthers
- Division: 6th Atlantic
- Conference: 12th Eastern
- 1997–98 record: 24–43–15
- Home record: 11–24–6
- Road record: 13–19–9
- Goals for: 203
- Goals against: 256

Team information
- General manager: Bryan Murray
- Coach: Doug MacLean (Oct.–Nov.); Bryan Murray (Nov.–Apr.)
- Captain: Scott Mellanby
- Arena: Miami Arena
- Average attendance: 14,703
- Minor league affiliates: Beast of New Haven; Tallahassee Tiger Sharks; Port Huron Border Cats

Team leaders
- Goals: Ray Whitney (32)
- Assists: Robert Svehla (34)
- Points: Ray Whitney (61)
- Penalty minutes: Paul Laus (263)
- Plus/minus: Ray Whitney (+10)
- Wins: John Vanbiesbrouck (18)
- Goals against average: John Vanbiesbrouck (2.87)

The 1997–98 Florida Panthers season was the Panthers' fifth season. After making the Stanley Cup playoffs in 1997, the Panthers failed to qualify for the playoffs for the first time since the 1994–95 season.

== Regular season ==
The Panthers' penalty kill struggled during the regular season and they allowed the most power-play goals in the NHL (82) and had the lowest penalty-kill percentage (79.65%). They also tied the Chicago Blackhawks, New York Islanders and Pittsburgh Penguins for the most short-handed goals allowed, with 16.

On November 26, 1997, the Panthers defeated the Boston Bruins at home by a score of 10–5. Veteran forward Ray Sheppard had a hat trick in the game. It was the first time in franchise history that the Panthers had scored 10 goals in a regular-season game. It also came exactly one year after the last NHL team had scored 10 goals in a regular-season game, as the Edmonton Oilers had defeated their provincial rival Calgary Flames on the road by a score of 10–1 on November 26, 1996.

=== Final standings ===
Atlantic Division
No.	CR		GP	W	L	T	GF	GA	Pts
1	1	**New Jersey Devils**	82	48	23	11	225	166	107
2	3	**Philadelphia Flyers**	82	42	29	11	242	193	95
3	4	**Washington Capitals**	82	40	30	12	219	202	92
4	10	New York Islanders	82	30	41	11	212	225	71
5	11	New York Rangers	82	25	39	18	197	231	68
6	12	Florida Panthers	82	24	43	15	203	256	63
7	13	Tampa Bay Lightning	82	17	55	10	151	269	44

Eastern Conference
R		Div	GP	W	L	T	GF	GA	Pts
**1**	**New Jersey Devils**	**ATL**	**82**	**48**	**23**	**11**	**225**	**166**	**107**
**2**	**Pittsburgh Penguins**	**NE**	**82**	**40**	**24**	**18**	**228**	**188**	**98**
**3**	**Philadelphia Flyers**	**ATL**	**82**	**42**	**29**	**11**	**242**	**193**	**95**
**4**	**Washington Capitals**	**ATL**	**82**	**40**	**30**	**12**	**219**	**202**	**92**
**5**	**Boston Bruins**	**NE**	**82**	**39**	**30**	**13**	**221**	**194**	**91**
**6**	**Buffalo Sabres**	**NE**	**82**	**36**	**29**	**17**	**211**	**187**	**89**
**7**	**Montreal Canadiens**	**NE**	**82**	**37**	**32**	**13**	**235**	**208**	**87**
**8**	**Ottawa Senators**	**NE**	**82**	**34**	**33**	**15**	**193**	**200**	**83**
9	Carolina Hurricanes	NE	82	33	41	8	200	219	74
10	New York Islanders	ATL	82	30	41	11	212	225	71
11	New York Rangers	ATL	82	25	39	18	197	231	68
12	Florida Panthers	ATL	82	24	43	15	203	256	63
13	Tampa Bay Lightning	ATL	82	17	55	10	151	269	44

Divisions: ATL – Atlantic, NE – Northeast

bold – Qualified for playoffs

== Schedule and results ==
1997–98 regular season
October: 3–6–3 (home: 1–2–2; road: 2–4–1)

Game	Date	Score	Opponent	Record	Recap
1	October 1, 1997	1–3	@ Philadelphia Flyers (1997–98)	0–1–0	L
2	October 4, 1997	5–3	@ Pittsburgh Penguins (1997–98)	1–1–0	W
3	October 11, 1997	3–5	@ St. Louis Blues (1997–98)	1–2–0	L
4	October 13, 1997	2–2 OT	New York Islanders (1997–98)	1–2–1	T
5	October 15, 1997	2–1	Tampa Bay Lightning (1997–98)	2–2–1	W
6	October 16, 1997	0–4	@ Dallas Stars (1997–98)	2–3–1	L
7	October 19, 1997	1–4	Pittsburgh Penguins (1997–98)	2–4–1	L
8	October 22, 1997	0–3	@ Montreal Canadiens (1997–98)	2–5–1	L
9	October 23, 1997	2–2 OT	@ Ottawa Senators (1997–98)	2–5–2	T
10	October 25, 1997	5–4	@ Boston Bruins (1997–98)	3–5–2	W
11	October 28, 1997	2–2 OT	Los Angeles Kings (1997–98)	3–5–3	T
12	October 30, 1997	2–5	Ottawa Senators (1997–98)	3–6–3	L

November: 5–7–2 (home: 2–7–1; road: 3–0–1)

Game	Date	Score	Opponent	Record	Recap
13	November 1, 1997	3–4 OT	Buffalo Sabres (1997–98)	3–7–3	L
14	November 5, 1997	2–4	New Jersey Devils (1997–98)	3–8–3	L
15	November 6, 1997	4–2	@ Buffalo Sabres (1997–98)	4–8–3	W
16	November 9, 1997	3–2	Washington Capitals (1997–98)	5–8–3	W
17	November 12, 1997	2–2 OT	New York Islanders (1997–98)	5–8–4	T
18	November 14, 1997	2–5	Philadelphia Flyers (1997–98)	5–9–4	L
19	November 15, 1997	1–0	@ New York Islanders (1997–98)	6–9–4	W
20	November 18, 1997	1–3	New York Rangers (1997–98)	6–10–4	L
21	November 20, 1997	1–2	Calgary Flames (1997–98)	6–11–4	L
22	November 22, 1997	2–1 OT	@ New Jersey Devils (1997–98)	7–11–4	W
23	November 23, 1997	2–5	Washington Capitals (1997–98)	7–12–4	L
24	November 26, 1997	10–5	Boston Bruins (1997–98)	8–12–4	W
25	November 28, 1997	2–3	Colorado Avalanche (1997–98)	8–13–4	L
26	November 30, 1997	1–1 OT	@ New York Rangers (1997–98)	8–13–5	T

December: 6–7–1 (home: 1–4–1; road: 5–3–0)

Game	Date	Score	Opponent	Record	Recap
27	December 1, 1997	2–3	Phoenix Coyotes (1997–98)	8–14–5	L
28	December 5, 1997	2–3 OT	@ Washington Capitals (1997–98)	8–15–5	L
29	December 7, 1997	5–4	Washington Capitals (1997–98)	9–15–5	W
30	December 10, 1997	5–2	@ Carolina Hurricanes (1997–98)	10–15–5	W
31	December 12, 1997	4–3	@ New York Rangers (1997–98)	11–15–5	W
32	December 13, 1997	1–4	@ New York Islanders (1997–98)	11–16–5	L
33	December 15, 1997	2–6	Boston Bruins (1997–98)	11–17–5	L
34	December 17, 1997	2–4	New York Rangers (1997–98)	11–18–5	L
35	December 18, 1997	4–0	@ Washington Capitals (1997–98)	12–18–5	W
36	December 20, 1997	0–2	@ Philadelphia Flyers (1997–98)	12–19–5	L
37	December 23, 1997	2–3	St. Louis Blues (1997–98)	12–20–5	L
38	December 26, 1997	5–2	@ Carolina Hurricanes (1997–98)	13–20–5	W
39	December 27, 1997	6–2	@ New York Islanders (1997–98)	14–20–5	W
40	December 30, 1997	2–2 OT	San Jose Sharks (1997–98)	14–20–6	T

January: 4–5–5 (home: 4–0–1; road: 0–5–4)

Game	Date	Score	Opponent	Record	Recap
41	January 1, 1998	2–1 OT	New Jersey Devils (1997–98)	15–20–6	W
42	January 2, 1998	2–2 OT	@ Tampa Bay Lightning (1997–98)	15–20–7	T
43	January 4, 1998	3–3 OT	Mighty Ducks of Anaheim (1997–98)	15–20–8	T
44	January 7, 1998	2–3	@ Edmonton Oilers (1997–98)	15–21–8	L
45	January 9, 1998	3–3 OT	@ Calgary Flames (1997–98)	15–21–9	T
46	January 10, 1998	2–2 OT	@ Vancouver Canucks (1997–98)	15–21–10	T
47	January 12, 1998	1–3	@ Colorado Avalanche (1997–98)	15–22–10	L
48	January 14, 1998	2–3	@ Phoenix Coyotes (1997–98)	15–23–10	L
49	January 21, 1998	3–8	@ Mighty Ducks of Anaheim (1997–98)	15–24–10	L
50	January 22, 1998	1–3	@ Los Angeles Kings (1997–98)	15–25–10	L
51	January 24, 1998	1–1 OT	@ San Jose Sharks (1997–98)	15–25–11	T
52	January 27, 1998	3–0	Carolina Hurricanes (1997–98)	16–25–11	W
53	January 29, 1998	3–2	Dallas Stars (1997–98)	17–25–11	W
54	January 31, 1998	2–0	Tampa Bay Lightning (1997–98)	18–25–11	W

February: 0–4–1 (home: 0–2–1; road: 0–2–0)

Game	Date	Score	Opponent	Record	Recap
55	February 1, 1998	2–5	Buffalo Sabres (1997–98)	18–26–11	L
56	February 3, 1998	1–1 OT	Detroit Red Wings (1997–98)	18–26–12	T
57	February 7, 1998	2–3	@ Toronto Maple Leafs (1997–98)	18–27–12	L
58	February 25, 1998	2–3	New Jersey Devils (1997–98)	18–28–12	L
59	February 27, 1998	1–3	@ Detroit Red Wings (1997–98)	18–29–12	L

March: 3–10–0 (home: 1–5–0; road: 2–5–0)

Game	Date	Score	Opponent	Record	Recap
60	March 4, 1998	3–4	New York Rangers (1997–98)	18–30–12	L
61	March 7, 1998	3–6	@ Washington Capitals (1997–98)	18–31–12	L
62	March 9, 1998	1–6	@ Montreal Canadiens (1997–98)	18–32–12	L
63	March 11, 1998	3–5	@ Ottawa Senators (1997–98)	18–33–12	L
64	March 13, 1998	0–4	Edmonton Oilers (1997–98)	18–34–12	L
65	March 15, 1998	4–8	Chicago Blackhawks (1997–98)	18–35–12	L
66	March 17, 1998	2–4	Vancouver Canucks (1997–98)	18–36–12	L
67	March 19, 1998	1–6	@ Buffalo Sabres (1997–98)	18–37–12	L
68	March 21, 1998	1–5	@ Tampa Bay Lightning (1997–98)	18–38–12	L
69	March 23, 1998	3–5	Carolina Hurricanes (1997–98)	18–39–12	L
70	March 26, 1998	5–4	Montreal Canadiens (1997–98)	19–39–12	W
71	March 28, 1998	3–2 OT	@ Boston Bruins (1997–98)	20–39–12	W
72	March 29, 1998	4–0	@ Chicago Blackhawks (1997–98)	21–39–12	W

April: 3–4–3 (home: 2–4–0; road: 1–0–3)

Game	Date	Score	Opponent	Record	Recap
73	April 1, 1998	3–4	Montreal Canadiens (1997–98)	21–40–12	L
74	April 4, 1998	4–1	@ Philadelphia Flyers (1997–98)	22–40–12	W
75	April 5, 1998	3–1	Pittsburgh Penguins (1997–98)	23–40–12	W
76	April 7, 1998	1–3	Toronto Maple Leafs (1997–98)	23–41–12	L
77	April 9, 1998	3–2	Philadelphia Flyers (1997–98)	24–41–12	W
78	April 11, 1998	3–3 OT	@ Pittsburgh Penguins (1997–98)	24–41–13	T
79	April 12, 1998	5–5 OT	@ New Jersey Devils (1997–98)	24–41–14	T
80	April 14, 1998	2–3	Ottawa Senators (1997–98)	24–42–14	L
81	April 16, 1998	3–7	Philadelphia Flyers (1997–98)	24–43–14	L
82	April 18, 1998	2–2 OT	@ Tampa Bay Lightning (1997–98)	24–43–15	T

Legend: W Win (2 points) L Loss (0 points) T Tie (1 point)

== Player statistics ==
=== Scoring ===
- Position abbreviations: C = Center; D = Defense; G = Goaltender; LW = Left wing; RW = Right wing
- † = Joined team via a transaction (e.g., trade, waivers, signing) during the season. Stats reflect time with the Panthers only.
- ‡ = Left team via a transaction (e.g., trade, waivers, release) during the season. Stats reflect time with the Panthers only.

No.	Player	Pos	Regular season					
No.	Player	Pos	GP	G	A	Pts	+/-	PIM
14	Ray Whitney†	LW	68	32	29	61	10	28
15	Dave Gagner	C	78	20	28	48	−21	55
24	Robert Svehla	D	79	9	34	43	−3	113
27	Scott Mellanby	RW	79	15	24	39	−14	127
19	Radek Dvorak	RW	64	12	24	36	−1	33
26	Ray Sheppard‡	RW	61	14	17	31	−13	21
9	Kirk Muller	LW	70	8	21	29	−14	54
11	Bill Lindsay	RW	82	12	16	28	−2	80
25	Viktor Kozlov†	C	46	12	11	23	−1	14
55	Ed Jovanovski	D	81	9	14	23	−12	158
51	David Nemirovsky	RW	41	9	12	21	−3	8
17	Steve Washburn	C	58	11	8	19	−6	32
5	Gord Murphy	D	79	6	11	17	−3	46
22	Dino Ciccarelli†	RW	28	5	11	16	−2	28
21	Tom Fitzgerald‡	RW	69	10	5	15	−4	57
44	Rob Niedermayer	C	33	8	7	15	−9	41
23	Chris Wells	C	61	5	10	15	4	47
3	Paul Laus	D	77	0	11	11	−5	293
10 (Note: Tikkanen wore number 97 in his first 14 games.)	Esa Tikkanen‡	LW	28	1	8	9	−7	16
2	Terry Carkner	D	74	1	7	8	6	63
6	Jeff Norton†	D	19	0	7	7	−7	18
29	Johan Garpenlov	LW	39	2	3	5	−6	8
7	Rhett Warrener	D	79	0	4	4	−16	99
34	John Vanbiesbrouck	G	60	0	3	3		6
12	Jody Hull‡	RW	21	2	0	2	1	4
16	Ryan Johnson	C	10	0	2	2	−4	0
8	Dallas Eakins	D	23	0	1	1	1	44
12	Chris Allen	D	1	0	0	0	0	2
30	Mark Fitzpatrick‡	G	12	0	0	0		2
4	John Jakopin	D	2	0	0	0	−3	4
10	Dave Lowry‡	LW	7	0	0	0	−1	2
1	Kirk McLean†	G	7	0	0	0		0
1	Kevin Weekes	G	11	0	0	0		0
28	Peter Worrell	LW	19	0	0	0	−4	153

=== Goaltending ===
- † = Joined team via a transaction (e.g., trade, waivers, signing) during the season. Stats reflect time with the Panthers only.
- ‡ = Left team via a transaction (e.g., trade, waivers, release) during the season. Stats reflect time with the Panthers only.

No.	Player	Regular season									
No.	Player	GP	W	L	T	SA	GA	GAA	SV%	SO	TOI
34	John Vanbiesbrouck	60	18	29	11	1638	165	2.87	.899	4	3451
1	Kirk McLean†	7	4	2	1	207	22	3.25	.894	0	406
30	Mark Fitzpatrick‡	12	2	7	2	265	32	3.00	.879	1	640
1	Kevin Weekes	11	0	5	1	247	32	3.96	.870	0	485

== Awards and records ==
=== Milestones ===
Milestone	Player	Date	Ref
First game	Kevin Weekes	October 16, 1997	
First game	Peter Worrell	November 22, 1997	
First game	Ryan Johnson	December 5, 1997	
First game	John Jakopin	March 13, 1998	
First game	Chris Allen	April 18, 1998	
1,000th game played	Kirk Muller	January 14, 1998	

== Draft picks ==
Florida's draft picks at the 1997 NHL entry draft held at the Civic Arena in Pittsburgh, Pennsylvania.

Round	#	Player	Nationality	College/Junior/Club team (League)
1	20	Mike Brown	Canada	Red Deer Rebels (WHL)
2	47	Kristian Huselius	Sweden	Farjestad BK (Sweden)
3	56	Vratislav Cech	Czech Republic	Kitchener Rangers (OHL)
3	74	Nick Smith	Canada	Barrie Colts (OHL)
4	95	Ivan Novoseltsev	Russia	Krylya Sovetov (Russia)
5	127	Pat Parthenais	United States	Detroit Whalers (OHL)
6	155	Keith Delaney	Canada	Barrie Colts (OHL)
7	183	Tyler Palmer	Canada	Lake Superior State University (CCHA)
8	211	Doug Schueller	United States	Twin Cities Vulcans (USHL)
9	237	Benoit Cote	United States	Shawinigan Cataractes (QMJHL)

== See also ==
- 1997–98 NHL season
