= 1998 National Hockey League All-Star Game =

Professional ice hockey exhibition game

1998 NHL All-Star Game
	1	2	3	Total
World	3	2	2	7
North America	3	3	2	8
- Date: January 18, 1998
- Arena: General Motors Place
- City: Vancouver
- MVP: Teemu Selanne (Anaheim)
- Attendance: 18,422

The 1998 National Hockey League All-Star Game took place at General Motors Place in Vancouver, home to the Vancouver Canucks, on January 18, 1998.

== The International Showdown ==
The 48th game was held in the very same year as the 1998 Winter Olympics in Nagano, providing the NHL to show its players from all over the world. To this extent, the NHL had the all-star teams consist of a team of North Americans playing against a team of stars from the rest of the world. These provisions only applied to the players – coaches were still selected based on which teams were the best from each conference at the time of the break. This was the last All-Star Game to feature Honorary Captains and Commissioner's Selections system that began in the 1985 and 1991 games respectively.

The Canadian Hockey Association took the all-star weekend as a way of assembling their team as a tuneup for the Olympics by inviting all 23 of its players and immersing them in what they would see at the Olympics. As the 1998 Olympics also featured the first-ever Olympic women's hockey tournament, an exhibition game between the Canadian national women's hockey team and the American national women's hockey team was also scheduled as part of the all-star festivities. 14,000 people watched the game, making it the highest attended women's hockey game in the sport's history to that time.

As the NHL was being outclassed in terms of revenue by other major sports, some such as Bob Gainey also proposed to change the rules so that a game consisted of four 15-minute quarters rather than three 20-minute periods, an idea that proved unpopular.

== Super Skills Competition ==
The World All-Stars won the first Super Skills Competition in the new International All-Star format. In the individual events Ray Bourque, Peter Forsberg and Brendan Shanahan would share the victory in the Accuracy Shooting event. Al MacInnis won his second-straight and fourth all-time Hardest Shot event, while Dominik Hasek won his second Goaltenders Competition.

=== Individual event winners ===
- Puck Control Relay – Teemu Selanne (Mighty Ducks of Anaheim)
- Fastest Skater – Scott Niedermayer (New Jersey Devils) – 13.560 seconds
- Accuracy Shooting – Ray Bourque (Boston Bruins)/Peter Forsberg (Colorado Avalanche)/Brendan Shanahan (Detroit Red Wings) – 4 hits, 6 shots
- Hardest Shot – Al MacInnis (St. Louis Blues) – 100.4 mph
- Goaltenders Competition - Dominik Hasek (Buffalo Sabres) - 3 GA, 16 shots

== Uniforms ==
Prior to the start of the 1997–98 season, the NHL changed its conference logos, replacing the teal and purple previously used by the Eastern and Western Conferences with burgundy and dark blue. Although the All-Star Game would not use a conference format, the uniform colors reflected the updated conference colors - which were similar to the changes in colors made by the host Canucks. The North American team wore burgundy uniforms with white and silver trim, while the World team wore white uniforms with blue and silver trim. Both jerseys featured diagonal striping on the body and sleeves, resembling a stylized spotlight design. The NHL shield featured on the front of the jerseys was rendered in black with silver accents instead of the usual orange, the beginning of a trend that would culminate in the redesign of the shield in 2005.

Following from the previous uniform design, players wore the All-Star Game patch on their right shoulder, and their team logo on their left shoulder. In addition, to mark the new international format of the game, players wore the flag of their country of origin on their right upper chest. The uniform design would be used again in the next All-Star Game in Tampa.

== The game ==
The North America All-Stars overcame a 3–0 deficit to the World All-Stars, setting the stage for the largest comeback victory in All-Star Game history in the first International showdown. Prior to the 1998 Game, no team had come back from a three-goal deficit to win. Mighty Ducks of Anaheim right winger Teemu Selanne recorded a hat-trick to become the first European player to be named All-Star MVP. Selanne also became the first player from a losing squad to receive the honour since Grant Fuhr accomplished that feat at the 1986 NHL All-Star Game.

== Boxscore ==
	North America	World
Final score	8	7
Head coach	(Canada) Jacques Lemaire (New Jersey Devils)	(Canada) Ken Hitchcock (Dallas Stars)
Honorary captain	Yvan Cournoyer	Ken Dryden
Assistant coach		
Lineup	Starting Lineup: 2 – (United States) D Brian Leetch (New York Rangers); 10 – (United States) LW John LeClair (Philadelphia Flyers); 14 – (Canada) LW Brendan Shanahan (Detroit Red Wings); 33 – (Canada) G Patrick Roy (Colorado Avalanche); 77 – (Canada) D Ray Bourque (Boston Bruins, Captain); 88 – (Canada) C Eric Lindros (Philadelphia Flyers); Commissioner's Selections: 11 – (Canada) C Mark Messier (Vancouver Canucks); 22 – (Canada) D Al MacInnis (St. Louis Blues); Reserves: 4 – (Canada) D Scott Stevens (New Jersey Devils); 5 – (Canada) D Darryl Sydor (Dallas Stars); 7 – (United States) D Chris Chelios (Chicago Blackhawks); 8 – (Canada) RW Mark Recchi (Montreal Canadiens); 9 – (United States) C Mike Modano (Dallas Stars); 12 – (United States) RW Tony Amonte (Chicago Blackhawks); 17 – (United States) LW Keith Tkachuk (Phoenix Coyotes); 19 – (Canada) C Joe Sakic (Colorado Avalanche); 20 – (Canada) G Ed Belfour (Dallas Stars); 27 – (Canada) LW Shayne Corson (Montreal Canadiens); 28 – (Canada) D Scott Niedermayer (New Jersey Devils); 30 – (Canada) G Martin Brodeur (New Jersey Devils); 39 – (United States) C Doug Weight (Edmonton Oilers); 74 – (Canada) RW Theoren Fleury (Calgary Flames); 99 – (Canada) C Wayne Gretzky (New York Rangers)	Starting Lineup: 2 – (Russia) D Viacheslav Fetisov (Detroit Red Wings); 6 – (Latvia) D Sandis Ozolinsh (Colorado Avalanche); 8 – (Finland) RW Teemu Selanne (Mighty Ducks of Anaheim); 21 – (Sweden) C Peter Forsberg (Colorado Avalanche); 39 - (Czech Republic) G Dominik Hasek (Buffalo Sabres); 68 – (Czech Republic) RW Jaromir Jagr (Pittsburgh Penguins); Commissioner's Selections: 7 – (Russia) C Igor Larionov (Detroit Red Wings, Captain); 17 – (Finland) RW Jari Kurri (Colorado Avalanche); Reserves: 5 – (Sweden) D Nicklas Lidstrom (Detroit Red Wings); 9 – (Finland) C Saku Koivu (Montreal Canadiens); 11 – (Sweden) RW Daniel Alfredsson (Ottawa Senators); 12 – (Slovakia) RW Peter Bondra (Washington Capitals); 13 – (Sweden) C Mats Sundin (Toronto Maple Leafs); 15 – (Russia) D Dmitri Mironov (Mighty Ducks of Anaheim); 16 – (Czech Republic) C Bobby Holik (New Jersey Devils); 18 – (Russia) LW Valeri Kamensky (Colorado Avalanche); 24 – (Slovakia) RW Zigmund Palffy (New York Islanders); 26 – (Finland) RW Jere Lehtinen (Dallas Stars); 29 – (Russia) D Igor Kravchuk (Ottawa Senators); 35 – (Russia) G Nikolai Khabibulin (Phoenix Coyotes); 37 – (Germany) G Olaf Kolzig (Washington Capitals); 56 – (Russia) D Sergei Zubov (Dallas Stars); 10 – (Russia) RW Pavel Bure (Vancouver Canucks)
Scoring summary	LeClair (Gretzky, Chelios) 4:13 first; Tkachuk (Fleury, Chelios) 10:50 first; Niedermayer (Sakic, Recchi) 18:25 first; Fleury (Modano, Tkachuk) 1:53 second; Lindros (Chelios, Messier) 14:46 second; Amonte (Sakic, Bourque) 16:19 second; Tkachuk (Modano, Fleury) 1:36 third; Messier (Gretzky) 4:00 third (GWG)	Selanne (Koivu) 0:53 first; Jagr (Bondra, Mironov) 2:15 first; Selanne (Lehtinen, Fetisov) 4:00 first; Selanne (Lehtinen, Koivu) 7:11 second; Kurri (Koivu, Lehtinen) 12:36 second; Kravchuk (Sundin, Forsberg) 7:03 third; Larionov (Bure) 9:41 third
Penalties	Fleury, tripping-obstruction 18:48 second; Weight, tripping 16:32 third	Fetisov, cross-checking 10:04 first
Shots on goal	13–17–13–43	7–11–11–29
Win/loss	W – Martin Brodeur	L – Nikolai Khabibulin

- Referee: Paul Stewart
- Linesmen: Mike Cvik, Shane Heyer
- Television: Fox, CBC, SRC

== See also ==
- 1997–98 NHL season
