= 1998–99 NHL transactions =

This list is for 1998–99 NHL transactions within professional ice hockey league of players in North America. The following contains team-to-team transactions that occurred in the National Hockey League during the 1998–99 NHL season. It lists what team each player has been traded to, or claimed by, and for which players or draft picks, if applicable.

== May ==
| Date | | | References |
|---|---|---|---|
| May 29, 1998 | To Los Angeles Kings future considerations | To Nashville Predators Marian Cisar | |
| May 30, 1998 | To Chicago Blackhawks Jean-Pierre Dumont; 5th-rd pick - 1998 entry draft (PHI - # 124 - Francis Belanger)^{1} | To New York Islanders Dmitri Nabokov | |

1. Chicago's acquired fifth-round pick went to Philadelphia as the result of a trade on June 27, 1998, that sent Paul Coffey to Chicago in exchange for a this pick.

== June ==
| Date | | | References |
|---|---|---|---|
| June 1, 1998 | To Colorado Avalanche 5th-rd pick - 1999 entry draft (# 142 - Will Magnuson) | To Carolina Hurricanes Randy Petruk | |
| June 2, 1998 | To Chicago Blackhawks Colin Pepperall | To New York Rangers 9th-rd pick - 1999 entry draft (# 251 - Petter Henning) | |
| June 11, 1998 | To Phoenix Coyotes Louie DeBrusk; 5th-rd pick - 1998 entry draft (# 115 - Jay Leach) | To Tampa Bay Lightning Craig Janney | |
| June 16, 1998 | To Edmonton Oilers rights to Josef Beranek | To Pittsburgh Penguins Bobby Dollas; Tony Hrkac | |
| June 17, 1998 | To Calgary Flames Dave Roche; Ken Wregget | To Pittsburgh Penguins Todd Hlushko; German Titov | |
| June 18, 1998 | To Buffalo Sabres Kay Whitmore; 2nd-rd pick - 1998 entry draft (# 50 - Jaroslav Kristek); 5th-rd pick - 2000 entry draft (CBJ - # 150 - Tyler Kolarik)^{1} | To San Jose Sharks Steve Shields; 4th-rd pick - 1998 entry draft (# 104 - Miroslav Zalesak) | |
| June 18, 1998 | To Edmonton Oilers Eric Fichaud | To New York Islanders Mike Watt | |
| June 18, 1998 | To Phoenix Coyotes Jean-Francois Jomphe | To Mighty Ducks of Anaheim Jim McKenzie | |
| June 18, 1998 | To Washington Capitals 3rd-rd pick - 1998 entry draft (# 59 - Todd Hornung); 2nd-rd pick - 1999 entry draft (# 29 - Michal Sivek) | To Tampa Bay Lightning Bill Ranford | |
| June 18, 1998 | To New Jersey Devils 4th-rd pick - 1998 entry draft (# 105 - Pierre Dagenais) | To Los Angeles Kings Doug Bodger | |
| June 26, 1998 | To San Jose Sharks 5th-rd pick - 1998 entry draft (PHO - # 116 - Josh Blackburn)^{2} | To Nashville Predators Ville Peltonen | |
| June 26, 1998 | To Nashville Predators Sergei Krivokrasov | To Chicago Blackhawks future considerations | |
| June 26, 1998 | To St. Louis Blues future considerations^{3} | To Nashville Predators Darren Turcotte conditional draft pick - highest compensatory pick - 1999 entry draft (FLO - # 40 - Alex Auld)^{4} or 2nd-rd pick - 2000 entry draft | |
| June 26, 1998 | To Montreal Canadiens future considerations | To Nashville Predators Sebastien Bordeleau | |
| June 26, 1998 | To Calgary Flames future considerations | To Nashville Predators Jim Dowd | |
| June 26, 1998 | To Nashville Predators Dominic Roussel; Jeff Staples | To Philadelphia Flyers 7th-rd pick - 1998 entry draft (# 175 - Cam Ondrik) | |
| June 26, 1998 | To Los Angeles Kings future considerations | To Nashville Predators Kimmo Timonen; Jan Vopat | |
| June 26, 1998 | To Colorado Avalanche future considerations^{5} | To Nashville Predators 5th-rd pick - 1998 entry draft (# 138 - Martin Beauchesne) | |
| June 27, 1998 | To San Jose Sharks 1st-rd pick - 1998 entry draft (# 3 - Brad Stuart); 2nd-rd pick - 1998 entry draft (# 29 - Jonathan Cheechoo) | To Nashville Predators 1st-rd pick - 1998 entry draft (# 2 - David Legwand); 3rd-rd pick - 1998 entry draft (# 85 - Geoff Koch) | |
| June 27, 1998 | To Toronto Maple Leafs 1st-rd pick - 1998 entry draft (# 10 - Nik Antropov); 3rd-rd pick - 1998 entry draft (# 69 - Jamie Hodson); 5th-rd pick - 1998 entry draft (# 126 - Morgan Warren) | To Chicago Blackhawks 1st-rd pick - 1998 entry draft (# 8 - Mark Bell); 4th-rd pick - 1998 entry draft (# 94 - Matthias Trattnig) | |
| June 27, 1998 | To New Jersey Devils 1st-rd pick - 1998 entry draft (# 27 - Scott Gomez) | To Dallas Stars 2nd-rd pick - 1998 entry draft (# 39 - John Erskine); 2nd-rd pick - 1998 entry draft (# 57 - Tyler Bouck) | |
| June 27, 1998 | To St. Louis Blues 2nd-rd pick - 1998 entry draft (# 41 - Maxim Linnik) | To Detroit Red Wings 2nd-rd pick - 1998 entry draft (# 55 - Ryan Barnes); 4th-rd pick - 1998 entry draft (# 111 - Brent Hobday) | |
| June 27, 1998 | To Colorado Avalanche 3rd-rd pick - 1998 entry draft (# 79 - Evgeny Lazarev) | To Washington Capitals 4th-rd pick - 1998 entry draft (# 106 - Krys Barch); 4th-rd pick - 1998 entry draft (# 107 - Chris Corrinet); 5th-rd pick - 1998 entry draft (# 118 - Mike Siklenka) | |
| June 27, 1998 | To New Jersey Devils 3rd-rd pick - 1998 entry draft (# 82 - Brian Gionta) | To Edmonton Oilers rights to Fredrik Bremberg; 4th-rd pick - 1998 entry draft (# 113 - Kristian Antila); 5th-rd pick - 1998 entry draft (# 144 - Oleg Smirnov) | |
| June 27, 1998 | To San Jose Sharks 5th-rd pick - 1999 entry draft (MTL - # 145 - Marc-Andre Thinel)^{6} | To Phoenix Coyotes 5th-rd pick - 1998 entry draft (# 116 - Josh Blackburn) | |
| June 27, 1998 | To Chicago Blackhawks Paul Coffey | To Philadelphia Flyers 5th-rd pick - 1998 entry draft (# 124 - Francis Belanger) | |
| June 27, 1998 | To Colorado Avalanche 6th-rd pick - 1999 entry draft (# 158 - Anders Lovdahl) | To Tampa Bay Lightning 7th-rd pick - 1998 entry draft (# 194 - Oak Hewer); 8th-rd pick - 1998 entry draft (# 221 - Dan Hulak); 9th-rd pick - 1998 entry draft (# 252 - Marin Cibak) | |
| June 27, 1998 | To San Jose Sharks 8th-rd pick - 1999 entry draft (# 241 - Douglas Murray) | To Ottawa Senators 8th-rd pick - 1998 entry draft (# 223 - Sergei Verenkin) | |
| June 27, 1998 | To San Jose Sharks rights to Gary Suter | To Chicago Blackhawks 9th-rd pick - 1998 entry draft (# 240 - Andrei Yershov) | |
| June 27, 1998 | To Boston Bruins 9th-rd pick - 1999 entry draft (# 247 - Mikko Eloranta) | To New York Islanders 9th-rd pick - 1998 entry draft (# 250 - Radek Matejovsky) | |
| June 27, 1998 | To Dallas Stars 9th-rd pick - 1999 entry draft (# 265 - Jamie Chamberlain) | To Philadelphia Flyers 9th-rd pick - 1998 entry draft (# 258 - Sergei Skrobot) | |
| June 30, 1998 | To Montreal Canadiens Sylvain Blouin; 6th-rd pick - 1999 entry draft (PHO - # 168 - Erik Lewerstrom)^{7} | To New York Rangers Peter Popovic | |
| June 30, 1998 | To Phoenix Coyotes Mike Sullivan | To Nashville Predators 7th-rd pick - 1999 entry draft (# 205 - Kyle Kettles) | |

1. Buffalo's acquired fifth-round pick went to Columbus as the result of a trade on June 23, 2000 that sent future considerations (Columbus agreed to select Geoff Sanderson and Dwayne Roloson in the 2000 NHL expansion draft) to Buffalo in exchange for Matt Davidson, Jean-Luc Grand-Pierre. a fifth-round pick in the 2001 entry draft and this pick.
2. San Jose's acquired fifth-round pick went to Phoenix as the result of a trade on June 27, 1998 that sent a fifth-round pick in the 1999 entry draft to San Jose in exchange for a this pick.
3. Nashville agreed to not select Jamie McLennan from Blues in 1998 NHL expansion draft.
4. Nashville's acquired second-round pick went to Florida as the result of a trade on June 26, 1999 that sent a second-round pick (# 45 overall) in the 1999 entry draft and a third-round pick in the 2000 entry draft to Nashville in exchange for this pick.
5. Nashville agreed to not select certain unspecified player(s) in the 1998 NHL expansion draft
6. San Jose's acquired fifth-round pick went to Montreal as the result of a trade on March 23, 1999 that sent Vincent Damphousse to San Jose in exchange for a first-round pick in the 2000 entry draft, San Jose's option of a second-round pick in the 2000 entry draft or 2001 entry draft and this pick.
7. Montreal's acquired sixth-round pick went to Phoenix as the result of a trade on June 26, 1999 that sent Jim Cummins to Montreal in exchange for this pick.

== July ==
| Date | | | References |
|---|---|---|---|
| July 2, 1998 | To Toronto Maple Leafs Ladislav Kohn | To Calgary Flames David Cooper | |
| July 7, 1998 | To Los Angeles Kings future considerations | To Nashville Predators Vitali Yachmenev | |
| July 9, 1998 | To Dallas Stars Tony Hrkac | To Nashville Predators future considerations | |
| July 14, 1998 | To Dallas Stars Aaron Gavey | To Calgary Flames Bob Bassen | |
| July 14, 1998 | To Nashville Predators Petr Sykora; 3rd-rd pick - 1999 entry draft (EDM - # 91 - Mike Comrie)^{1} future considerations (4th-rd pick - 1999 entry draft # 124 - Alexander Krevsun)^{2} | To Detroit Red Wings Doug Brown | |
| July 14, 1998 | To Calgary Flames rights to Jan Hlavac | To New York Islanders rights to Jorgen Jonsson | |
| July 17, 1998 | To Chicago Blackhawks Mark Fitzpatrick; 4th-rd pick - 1999 entry draft (MTL - # 97 - Chris Dyment)^{3} | To Tampa Bay Lightning Michal Sykora | |
| July 31, 1998 | To Los Angeles Kings Manny Legace | To Carolina Hurricanes future considerations | |

1. Nashville's acquired fourth-round pick went to Edmonton as the result of a trade on June 26, 1999, that sent Craig Millar to Nashville in exchange for this pick.
2. Trade completed on June 26, 1999
3. Chicago's acquired fourth-round pick went to Montreal as the result of a trade on November 16, 1998, that sent Brad Brown, Dave Manson and Jocelyn Thibault to Chicago in exchange for Jeff Hackett, Alain Nasreddine, Eric Weinrich and this pick.

== August ==
| Date | | | References |
|---|---|---|---|
| August 6, 1998 | To San Jose Sharks Johan Hedberg | To Philadelphia Flyers 7th-rd pick - 1999 entry draft (# 200 - Pavel Kasparik) | |
| August 7, 1998 | To Calgary Flames 9th-rd pick - 2000 entry draft (WAS - # 289 - Bjorn Nord)^{1} future considerations | To Washington Capitals Rick Tabaracci | |
| August 11, 1998 | To Mighty Ducks of Anaheim Stu Grimson; Kevin Haller | To Carolina Hurricanes Dave Karpa; 4th-rd pick - 2000 entry draft (ATL - # 108 - Blake Robson)^{2} | |
| August 19, 1998 | To Nashville Predators Jeff Nelson | To Washington Capitals future considerations | |
| August 21, 1998 | To Chicago Blackhawks Justin Hocking | To Ottawa Senators Brian Felsner | |
| August 25, 1998 | To Philadelphia Flyers 6th-rd pick - 2000 entry draft (MTL - # 172 - Scott Selig)^{3} | To New York Islanders rights to Raymond Giroux | |
| August 25, 1998 | To New Jersey Devils Chris Terreri | To Chicago Blackhawks conditional pick - 1999 entry draft (2nd-rd - # 63 - Stephan Mokhov)^{4} | |
| August 26, 1998 | To New Jersey Devils Ken Sutton | To San Jose Sharks 5th-rd pick - 1999 entry draft (# 155 - Niko Dimitrakos) | |

1. Washington re-acquired this pick as the result of a trade on March 22, 1999 that sent Tom Chorske to Calgary in exchange for a seventh-round pick in the 2000 entry draft and this pick.
2. Carolina's acquired fourth-round pick went Atlanta as the result of a trade on June 24, 2000 that sent a fourth-round pick in the 2000 entry draft to Carolina in exchange for fifth and eighth-round picks along with this pick.
3. Philadelphia's acquired sixth-round pick went to Montreal as the result of a trade on March 10, 1999 that sent Mark Recchi to Philadelphia in exchange for Dainius Zubrus, Montreal's option of a second-round pick from Philadelphia in the 1999 entry draft or 2000 entry draft or a second-round pick from the Islanders in the 2000 entry draft and this pick.
4. Conditions of this draft pick are unknown.

== September ==
| Date | | | References |
|---|---|---|---|
| September 3, 1998 | To Los Angeles Kings 3rd-rd pick - 1999 entry draft (# 76 - Frantisek Kaberle) | To Chicago Blackhawks Doug Zmolek | |
| September 10, 1998 | To Colorado Avalanche cash | To New York Islanders Nick Beaudoin | |

== October ==
| Date | | | References |
|---|---|---|---|
| October 1, 1998 | To Detroit Red Wings 3rd-rd pick - 2000 entry draft (CHI - # 74 - Igor Radulov)^{1} | To New York Rangers Mike Knuble | |
| October 1, 1998 | To Edmonton Oilers Jim Dowd; Mikhail Shtalenkov | To Nashville Predators Drake Berehowsky; Greg de Vries; Eric Fichaud | |
| October 5, 1998 | To Detroit Red Wings Brent Gilchrist | To Tampa Bay Lightning 6th-rd pick - 1999 entry draft (DET - # 181 - Kent McDonell)^{2} | |
| October 5, 1998 | To Mighty Ducks of Anaheim Dominic Roussel | To Nashville Predators Chris Mason; Marc Moro | |
| October 5, 1998 | To Edmonton Oilers Daniel Lacroix | To Philadelphia Flyers Valeri Zelepukin | |
| October 9, 1998 | To Mighty Ducks of Anaheim future considerations | To Detroit Red Wings Doug Houda | |
| October 13, 1998 | To Calgary Flames 3rd-rd pick - 1999 entry draft (NYR - # 90 - Patrick Aufiero)^{3} | To Philadelphia Flyers rights to Ryan Bast^{4} 8th-rd pick - 1999 entry draft (# 224 - David Nystrom) | |
| October 14, 1998 | To Toronto Maple Leafs Alexander Karpovtsev; 4th-rd pick - 1999 entry draft (# 108 - Mirko Murovic) | To New York Rangers Mathieu Schneider | |
| October 15, 1998 | To Chicago Blackhawks 9th-rd pick - 1999 entry draft (WAS - # 249 - Igor Shadilov)^{4} | To Washington Capitals James Black | |
| October 16, 1998 | To Washington Capitals Tom Chorske; 8th-rd pick - 1999 entry draft (# 219 - Maxim Orlov) | To New York Islanders 6th-rd pick - 1999 entry draft (# 163 - Bjorn Melin) | |
| October 19, 1998 | To Vancouver Canucks Trent Klatt | To Philadelphia Flyers 6th-rd pick - 2000 entry draft (ATL - # 178 - Jeff Dwyer)^{6} | |
| October 22, 1998 | To Los Angeles Kings Ryan Bach | To Detroit Red Wings conditional pick - 2000 entry draft (6th-rd - # 187 - Par Backer)^{7} | |
| October 25, 1998 | To Nashville Predators 3rd-rd pick - 1999 entry draft (COL - # 93 - Branko Radivojevic)^{8} | To Colorado Predators Greg de Vries | |
| October 27, 1998 | To Calgary Flames Steve Dubinsky; Jeff Shantz | To Chicago Blackhawks Jamie Allison; Erik Andersson; Marty McInnis | |
| October 27, 1998 | To Mighty Ducks of Anaheim Marty McInnis | To Chicago Blackhawks 4th-rd pick - 2000 entry draft (WAS - # 121 - Ryan Van Buskirk)^{9} | |
| October 29, 1998 | To Los Angeles Kings Eric Lacroix | To Colorado Avalanche Roman Vopat; 6th-rd pick - 1999 entry draft (OTT - # 164 - Martin Prusek)^{10} | |
| October 31, 1998 | To Phoenix Coyotes future considerations | To Nashville Predators Richard Lintner; Cliff Ronning | |

1. San Jose's acquired third-round pick went to Chicago as the result of a trade on June 24, 2000 that sent a second-round pick (# 41 overall) in the 2000 Entry Draft to San Jose in exchange for a second-round pick (#49 overall) and this pick.
  Tampa Bay's acquired third-round pick went to San Jose as the result of a trade on August 4, 1999 that sent Shawn Burr, Steve Guolla, Bill Houlder and Andrei Zyuzin to Tampa Bay in exchange for Niklas Sundstrom and this pick.
  The Rangers' re-acquired pick went to Tampa Bay as the result of a trade on June 26, 1999 that sent a first-round pick in the 1999 entry draft to the Rangers in exchange for Dan Cloutier, Niklas Sundstrom, a first-round pick in the 2000 entry draft and this pick.
  The Rangers' third-round pick was re-acquired as the result of a trade on March 23, 1999 that sent Ulf Samuelsson to Detroit in exchange for a second-round pick in the 1999 entry draft and this pick.
2. Detroit's sixth-round pick was re-acquired as the result of a trade on March 23, 1999 that sent Kevin Hodson and a second-round pick in the 1999 Entry Draft to Tampa Bay in exchange for Wendel Clark and this pick.
3. Calgary's acquired third-round pick went to the Rangers as the result of a trade on June 26, 1999 that sent Marc Savard and a first-round pick (# 11 overall) in the 1999 entry draft to Calgary in exchange for the rights to Jan Hlavac, a first-round pick (# 9 overall) in the 1999 entry draft and this pick.
4. This was a compromise deal to resolve a dispute between Calgary and Philadelphia after Philadelphia signed Ryan Bast as a free agent on May 18, 1998.
5. Washington's ninth-round pick was re-acquired as the result of a trade on June 26, 1999 that sent a seventh-round pick in the 2000 entry draft to Chicago in exchange for this pick.
6. Philadelphia's acquired sixth-round pick went to Atlanta as the result of a trade on March 14, 2000 that sent Kirby Law to Philadelphia in exchange for a sixth-round pick in the 2001 entry draft and this pick.
7. Conditions of this draft pick are unknown.
8. Colorado's third-round pick was re-acquired as the result of a trade on June 26, 1999 that sent two second-round picks (# 54 & 61 overall) in the 1999 entry draft to Nashville in exchange for a second-round pick (# 45 overall) in the 1999 entry draft and this pick.
9. Chicago's acquired fourth-round pick went to Washington as the result of a trade on June 25, 2000 that sent fifth and sixth-round picks in the 2000 entry draft to Chicago in exchange for this pick.
10. Chicago's acquired sixth-round pick went to Ottawa as the result of a trade on March 12, 1999 that sent Radim Bicanek to Chicago in exchange for this pick.
  Chicago previously acquired this pick as the result of a trade on November 10, 1998, that sent Cam Russell to Colorado in exchange for Roman Vopat and this pick.

== November ==
| Date | | | References |
|---|---|---|---|
| November 7, 1998 | To Boston Bruins Ken Belanger | To New York Islanders Ted Donato | |
| November 10, 1998 | To Chicago Blackhawks Roman Vopat; 6th-rd pick - 1999 entry draft (OTT - # 164 - Martin Prusek)^{1} | To Colorado Avalanche Cam Russell | |
| November 11, 1998 | To Dallas Stars Jeff Norton | To Nashville Predators Alex Hicks; 5th-rd pick - 1999 entry draft (NYI - # 140 - Adam Johnson)^{2} | |
| November 12, 1998 | To Colorado Avalanche Shjon Podein | To Philadelphia Flyers Keith Jones | |
| November 13, 1998 | To New Jersey Devils New Jersey's option of a 3rd-rd pick – 1999 entry draft or 2000 entry draft (# 76 – Michael Rupp) | To Chicago Blackhawks Bryan Muir | |
| November 16, 1998 | To Montreal Canadiens Jeff Hackett; Alain Nasreddine; Eric Weinrich; 4th-rd pick - 1999 entry draft (# 97 - Chris Dyment) | To Chicago Blackhawks Brad Brown; Dave Manson; Jocelyn Thibault | |
| November 17, 1998 | To Chicago Blackhawks Mike Maneluk | To Philadelphia Flyers Roman Vopat | |
| November 25, 1998 | To Pittsburgh Penguins Alexei Kovalev; Harry York | To New York Rangers Petr Nedved; Sean Pronger; Chris Tamer | |
| November 27, 1998 | To New York Rangers Stanislav Neckar | To Ottawa Senators Bill Berg; 2nd-rd pick - 1999 entry draft (ANA - # 44 - Jordan Leopold)^{3} | |

1. Chicago's acquired sixth-round pick went to Ottawa as the result of a trade on March 12, 1999 that sent Radim Bicanek to Chicago in exchange for this pick.
2. Florida's acquired fifth-round pick went to the Islanders as the result of a trade on June 26, 1999 that sent the rights to Jiri Dopita to Florida in exchange for this pick.
3. Ottawa's acquired second-round pick went to Anaheim as the result of a trade on June 26, 1999 that sent a second-round pick (# 48 overall) and a sixth-round pick in the 1999 Entry Draft to Ottawa in exchange for this pick.

== December ==
| Date | | | References |
|---|---|---|---|
| December 10, 1998 | To Mighty Ducks of Anaheim 5th-rd pick - 2000 entry draft (# 134 - Peter Podhradsky) | To Tampa Bay Lightning Drew Bannister | |
| December 12, 1998 | To Tampa Bay Lightning Chris Gratton; Mike Sillinger | To Philadelphia Flyers Daymond Langkow; Mikael Renberg | |
| December 15, 1998 | To Colorado Avalanche Michael Gaul | To New York Islanders Ted Crowley | |
| December 18, 1998 | To Buffalo Sabres 2nd-rd pick - 1999 entry draft (# 35 - Milan Bartovic) | To Los Angeles Kings Donald Audette | |
| December 28, 1998 | To Washington Capitals Enrico Ciccone | To Tampa Bay Lightning cash | |
| December 28, 1998 | To Tampa Bay Lightning Petr Svoboda | To Philadelphia Flyers Karl Dykhuis | |
| December 29, 1998 | To Chicago Blackhawks Nelson Emerson | To Carolina Hurricanes Paul Coffey | |
| December 29, 1998 | To Calgary Flames Andrei Trefilov | To Chicago Blackhawks 7th-rd pick - 1999 entry draft (# 195 - Yorick Treille) | |

== January ==
| Date | | | References |
|---|---|---|---|
| January 8, 1999 | To Chicago Blackhawks Frank Bialowas | To Philadelphia Flyers Dennis Bonvie | |
| January 9, 1999 | To Toronto Maple Leafs Bryan Berard; 6th-rd pick - 1999 entry draft (# 161 - Jan Sochor) | To New York Islanders Felix Potvin; 6th-rd pick - 1999 entry draft (TBL - # 182 - Fedor Fedorov)^{1} | |
| January 13, 1999 | To Phoenix Coyotes Jean-Jacques Daigneault | To Nashville Predators future considerations | |
| January 17, 1999 | To Vancouver Canucks Mike Brown; Dave Gagner; Ed Jovanovski; Kevin Weekes option of a 1st-rd pick 1999 entry draft or 2000 entry draft (2000 - # 23 – Nathan Smith)^{2} | To Florida Panthers Pavel Bure; Brad Ference; Bret Hedican option of a 3rd-rd pick 1999 entry draft or 2000 entry draft (2000 - # 77 – Robert Fried)^{2} | |
| January 18, 1999 | To Tampa Bay Lightning 6th-rd pick - 1999 entry draft (# 182 - Fedor Fedorov) | To New York Islanders Craig Janney | |
| January 19, 1999 | To Calgary Flames Andrei Nazarov | To Tampa Bay Lightning Michael Nylander | |
| January 26, 1999 | To Nashville Predators Serhiy Klymentiev | To Philadelphia Flyers cash | |
| January 28, 1999 | To Mighty Ducks of Anaheim 4th-rd pick - 1999 entry draft (# 105 - Alexander Chagodayev) | To Chicago Blackhawks Josef Marha | |
| January 29, 1999 | To Edmonton Oilers Alexandre Daigle | To Philadelphia Flyers Andrei Kovalenko | |
| January 29, 1999 | To Edmonton Oilers Alex Selivanov | To Tampa Bay Lightning Alexandre Daigle | |
| January 29, 1999 | To Calgary Flames future considerations | To Tampa Bay Lightning Sami Helenius | |

1. The Islanders' acquired sixth-round pick went to Tampa Bay as the result of a trade on January 18, 1999 that sent Craig Janney to the Islanders in exchange for this pick.
2. The option was at Florida's discretion.

== February ==
| Date | | | References |
|---|---|---|---|
| February 3, 1999 | To Edmonton Oilers Brad Church | To Washington Capitals rights to Barrie Moore | |
| February 10, 1999 | To Pittsburgh Penguins future considerations | To Philadelphia Flyers Sean O`Brien | |
| February 12, 1999 | To Los Angeles Kings Sean Pronger | To New York Rangers Eric Lacroix | |
| February 13, 1999 | To St. Louis Blues Jeff Finley; Geoff Smith | To New York Rangers future considerations (Chris Kenady)^{1} | |
| February 16, 1999 | To Toronto Maple Leafs Chris McAllister | To Vancouver Canucks Darby Hendrickson | |
| February 17, 1999 | To Toronto Maple Leafs David Nemirovsky | To Florida Panthers Jeff Ware | |
| February 28, 1999 | To Calgary Flames Wade Belak; Rene Corbet future considerations^{2} (rights to Robyn Regehr) (2nd-rd pick - 2000 entry draft # 46 - Jarret Stoll) | To Colorado Avalanche Chris Dingman; Theoren Fleury | |

1. Trade completed on February 22, 1999.
2. Date of completion of the trade is unknown.

== March ==
- Trading Deadline: March 23, 1999

| Date | | | References |
|---|---|---|---|
| March 6, 1999 | To Carolina Hurricanes Andrei Kovalenko | To Philadelphia Flyers Adam Burt | |
| March 8, 1999 | To Florida Panthers 6th-rd pick - 1999 entry draft (DAL - # 184 - Justin Cox)^{1} | To Ottawa Senators Viacheslav Butsayev | |
| March 8, 1999 | To Phoenix Coyotes Jamie Huscroft | To Vancouver Canucks future considerations | |
| March 9, 1999 | To Montreal Canadiens Scott Lachance | To New York Islanders 3rd-rd pick - 1999 entry draft (# 78 - Mattias Weinhandl) | |
| March 10, 1999 | To Montreal Canadiens Dainius Zubrus; 6th-rd pick – 2000 entry draft (# 172 – Scott Selig); Montreal's option of Philadelphia's; 2nd-rd pick – 1999 entry draft (# 58 – Matt Carkner) or 2000 entry draft or the Islanders'; 2nd-rd pick – 2000 entry draft | To Philadelphia Flyers Mark Recchi | |
| March 11, 1999 | To Buffalo Sabres Stu Barnes | To Pittsburgh Penguins Matthew Barnaby | |
| March 11, 1999 | To Phoenix Coyotes Mikhail Shtalenkov | To Edmonton Oilers 5th-rd pick - 2000 entry draft (NAS - # 154 - Matt Koalska)^{2} | |
| March 12, 1999 | To Chicago Blackhawks Radim Bicanek | To Ottawa Senators 6th-rd pick - 1999 entry draft (# 164 - Martin Prusek) | |
| March 18, 1999 | To Tampa Bay Lightning cash | To Pittsburgh Penguins Brent Peterson | |
| March 18, 1999 | To St. Louis Blues Brad Shaw; 8th-rd pick - 1999 entry draft (# 221 - Colin Hemingway) | To Washington Capitals 6th-rd pick - 1999 entry draft (# 175 - Kyle Clark) | |
| March 19, 1999 | To New York Islanders cash | To Ottawa Senators Chris Luongo | |
| March 20, 1999 | To New York Islanders 4th-rd pick - 1999 entry draft (PHO - # 123 - Preston Mizzi)^{3} | To Ottawa Senators Ted Donato | |
| March 20, 1999 | To Edmonton Oilers Daniel Cleary; Chad Kilger; Christian Laflamme; Ethan Moreau; Edmonton's option to swap 2nd-rd picks – 1999 entry draft (# 36 – Alexei Semenov) | To Chicago Blackhawks Jonas Elofsson; Dean McAmmond; Boris Mironov; Edmonton's option to swap 2nd-rd picks – 1999 entry draft (# 46 – Dmitri Levinsky) | |
| March 20, 1999 | To Edmonton Oilers Tommy Salo | To New York Islanders Mats Lindgren; 8th-rd pick - 1999 entry draft (# 228 - Radek Martinek) | |
| March 20, 1999 | To Tampa Bay Lightning Colin Forbes conditional pick - 1999 entry draft^{4} (5th-rd - # 148 - Michal Lanicek) or - 2000 entry draft | To Philadelphia Flyers Mikael Andersson; Sandy McCarthy | |
| March 20, 1999 | To Phoenix Coyotes Robert Reichel; 3rd-rd pick - 1999 entry draft (# 71 - Jason Jaspers); 4th-rd pick - 1999 entry draft (# 123 - Preston Mizzi) | To New York Islanders Brad Isbister; 3rd-rd pick - 1999 entry draft (# 87 - Brian Collins) | |
| March 21, 1999 | To Dallas Stars Benoit Hogue conditional 6th-rd pick - 2001 entry draft (# 167 - Michal Blazek)^{5} | To Tampa Bay Lightning Sergey Gusev | |
| March 22, 1999 | To New Jersey Devils Sergei Nemchinov | To New York Islanders 4th-rd pick - 1999 entry draft (LAK - # 125 - Daniel Johansson)^{6} | |
| March 22, 1999 | To Calgary Flames Tom Chorske | To Washington Capitals 7th-rd pick – 2000 entry draft (LAK - # 206 - Tim Eriksson)^{7} 9th-rd pick – 2000 entry draft (# 289 – Bjorn Nord) | |
| March 23, 1999 | To Mighty Ducks of Anaheim Peter Zezel | To Vancouver Canucks future considerations^{8} | |
| March 23, 1999 | To Buffalo Sabres 2nd-rd pick - 1999 entry draft (# 64 - Michael Zigomanis) | To Dallas Stars Derek Plante | |
| March 23, 1999 | To Montreal Canadiens 5th-rd pick – 1999 entry draft (# 145 – Marc-Anre Thinel); 1st-rd pick – 2000 entry draft (# 16 – Marcel Hossa); 2nd-rd pick – 2000 entry draft or 2001 entry draft (San Jose's option) (CBJ -# 53 – Kiel McLeod)^{9} | To San Jose Sharks Vincent Damphousse | |
| March 23, 1999 | To San Jose Sharks Greg Pankewicz | To Calgary Flames cash | |
| March 23, 1999 | To Chicago Blackhawks Chris Murray | To Ottawa Senators Nelson Emerson | |
| March 23, 1999 | To Buffalo Sabres Joe Juneau; 3rd-rd pick – 1999 entry draft (# 73 – Tim Preston) | To Washington Capitals Alexei Tezikov; 4th-rd pick – 2000 entry draft (CAL - # 116 – Levente Szuper)^{10} | |
| March 23, 1999 | To Buffalo Sabres Rhett Warrener; 5th-rd pick - 1999 entry draft (# 138 - Ryan Miller) | To Florida Panthers Mike Wilson | |
| March 23, 1999 | To Detroit Red Wings Chris Chelios | To Chicago Blackhawks Anders Eriksson; 1st-rd pick - 1999 entry draft (# 23 - Steve McCarthy); 1st-rd pick - 2001 entry draft (# 29 - Adam Munro) | |
| March 23, 1999 | To Detroit Red Wings Bill Ranford | To Tampa Bay Lightning conditional pick - 1999 entry draft^{11} | |
| March 23, 1999 | To Detroit Red Wings Wendel Clark; 6th-rd pick - 1999 entry draft (# 181 - Kent McDonell) | To Tampa Bay Lightning Kevin Hodson; 2nd-rd pick - 1999 entry draft (# 47 - Sheldon Keefe) | |
| March 23, 1999 | To Detroit Red Wings Ulf Samuelsson | To New York Rangers 2nd-rd pick - 1999 entry draft (# 59 - David Inman); 3rd-rd pick - 2000 entry draft (CHI - # 74 - Igor Radulov)^{12} | |
| March 23, 1999 | To Phoenix Coyotes Stanislav Neckar | To New York Rangers Jason Doig; 6th-rd pick - 1999 entry draft ([# 177 - Jay Dardis) | |
| March 23, 1999 | To Calgary Flames Lee Sorochan | To New York Rangers Chris O'Sullivan | |
| March 23, 1999 | To Edmonton Oilers Vladimir Vorobiev | To New York Rangers Kevin Brown | |
| March 23, 1999 | To St. Louis Blues Blair Atcheynum | To Nashville Predators 6th-rd pick - 2000 entry draft (# 197 - Zbynek Irgl) | |
| March 23, 1999 | To Toronto Maple Leafs 4th-rd pick - 1999 entry draft (# 110 - Jonathan Zion); 2nd-rd pick - 2000 entry draft (# 51 - Kris Vernarsky) | To Edmonton Oilers Jason Smith | |
| March 23, 1999 | To Toronto Maple Leafs Yanic Perreault | To Los Angeles Kings Jason Podollan; 3rd-rd pick - 1999 entry draft (# 92 - Cory Campbell) | |
| March 23, 1999 | To Colorado Avalanche Sami Helenius | To Tampa Bay Lightning future considerations | |
| March 23, 1999 | To Los Angeles Kings Dave Babych; 5th-rd pick - 2000 entry draft (# 165 - Nathan Marsters) | To Philadelphia Flyers Steve Duchesne | |
| March 23, 1999 | To Washington Capitals cash | To Philadelphia Flyers Craig Berube | |
| March 23, 1999 | To Montreal Canadiens Jean-Francois Jomphe | To Phoenix Coyotes cash | |
| March 23, 1999 | To Colorado Avalanche Dale Hunter; 3rd-rd picks – 2000 entry draft (# 92 – Sergei Klyazmin) | To Washington Capitals 2nd-rd pick – 1999 entry draft (# 31 – Charlie Stephens) or 2000 entry draft^{13} | |

1. Atlanta's acquired sixth-round pick went to Dallas as the result of a trade on June 26, 1999 that sent Per Svartvadet to Atlanta in exchange for this pick.
  Atlanta previously acquired this pick as the result of a trade on June 25, 1999 that sent Trevor Kidd to Florida in exchange for Gord Murphy, Daniel Tjarnqvist, Herbert Vasiljevs and this pick.
2. Edmonton's acquired fifth-round pick went to Nashville as the result of a trade on June 12, 2000 that sent Patrick Cote to Edmonton in exchange for this pick.
3. The Islanders' acquired fourth-round pick went to Phoenix as the result of a trade on March 20, 1999 that sent Brad Isbister and a third-round pick in the 1999 entry draft to the Islanders in exchange for Robert Reichel, a third-round pick in the 1999 entry draft and this pick.
4. Conditions of this draft pick are unknown.
5. Conditions of this draft pick are unknown.
6. The Islanders' acquired fourth-round pick went to Los Angeles as the result of a trade on June 19, 1999 that sent Mathieu Biron, Josh Green, Olli Jokinen and a first-round pick in the 1999 entry draft to the Islanders in exchange for Marcel Cousineau, Zigmund Palffy, Bryan Smolinski and this pick.
7. Washington's acquired seventh-round pick went to Los Angeles as the result of a trade on June 25, 2000 that sent a fifth-round pick in the 2000 Entry Draft to Washington in exchange for a seventh-round pick (# 201 overall) in the 2000 Entry Draft and this pick.
8. Peter Zezel refuse to report and announce his retirement. The NHL nullified the trade.
9. Montreal's second-round pick went to Columbus as the result of a trade on June 23, 2000, to complete an agreement that Columbus selects Frederic Chabot in the 2000 NHL expansion draft in exchange for this pick.
10. Washington's acquired fourth-round pick went to Calgary as the result of a trade on June 24, 2000 that sent a second-round pick in the 2000 Entry Draft to Washington in exchange for Miika Elomo and this pick.
11. Conditions of this draft pick are unknown. Tampa Bay did not select a pick from this trade.
12. San Jose's acquired third-round pick went to Chicago as the result of a trade on June 24, 2000 that sent a second-round pick (# 41 overall) in the 2000 Entry Draft to San Jose in exchange for a second-round pick (#49 overall) and this pick.
  Tampa Bay's acquired third-round pick went to San Jose as the result of a trade on August 4, 1999 that sent Shawn Burr, Steve Guolla, Bill Houlder and Andrei Zyuzin to Tampa Bay in exchange for Niklas Sundstrom and this pick.
  The Rangers' re-acquired pick went to Tampa Bay as the result of a trade on June 26, 1999 that sent a first-round pick in the 1999 entry draft to the Rangers in exchange for Dan Cloutier, Niklas Sundstrom, a first-round pick in the 2000 Entry Draft and this pick.
13. Conditions of this draft pick are unknown.

== April ==
| Date | | | References |
|---|---|---|---|
| April 13, 1999 | To Nashville Predators Andy Berenzweig | To New York Islanders 4th-rd pick - 1999 entry draft (# 102 - Johan Halvardsson) | |

== See also ==
- 1998 NHL entry draft
- 1998 in sports
- 1999 in sports
