= Pištěk =

Pištěk is a Czech surname. A Slovak form of the name is Pištek. The feminine form of the Czech surname is Pištěková. Notable people with the surname include:

- František Pištěk (1786–1846), Roman Catholic archbishop in the Austrian Empire
- Ľubomír Pištek (born 1980), Slovak ice hockey player
- Tereza Pištěková (born 2005), Czech ice hockey player
- Theodor Pištěk (actor) (1895–1960), Czech actor and film director
- Theodor Pištěk (artist) (1932–2025), Czech painter, costume designer, set designer and racing driver, son of the above actor
