= 1998 NHL entry draft =

1998 North American ice hockey draft

General information
- Date: June 27, 1998
- Location: Marine Midland Arena; Buffalo, New York, U.S.

Overview
- 258 total selections in 9 rounds
- First selection: (Canada) Vincent Lecavalier (Tampa Bay Lightning)
- Hall of Famers: 1: C Pavel Datsyuk

The 1998 NHL entry draft was the 36th draft for the National Hockey League. It was held on June 27 at the Marine Midland Arena in Buffalo, New York. A total of 258 players were drafted.

The last active players in the NHL from this draft class were Francois Beauchemin, Mike Fisher and Brian Gionta, who all retired after the 2017–18 season.

== Selections by round ==
Club teams are located in North America unless otherwise noted.

=== Round one ===
= NHL All-Star team ·	= NHL All-Star (Note: Players are identified as an All-Star if they were selected for the All-Star game at any time in their career.) ·	= NHL All-Star and NHL All-Star team ·	= Hall of Famers

Pick	Player	Nationality	NHL team	College/junior/club team
1	Vincent Lecavalier (C)	Canada	Tampa Bay Lightning (from Florida via San Jose)^{1}	Rimouski Oceanic (QMJHL)
2	David Legwand (C)	United States	Nashville Predators (from Tampa Bay via San Jose)^{2}	Plymouth Whalers (OHL)
3	Brad Stuart (D)	Canada	San Jose Sharks (from Nashville)^{3}	Regina Pats (WHL)
4	Bryan Allen (D)	Canada	Vancouver Canucks	Oshawa Generals (OHL)
5	Vitali Vishnevski (D)	Russia	Mighty Ducks of Anaheim	Torpedo Yaroslavl (Russia)
6	Rico Fata (RW)	Canada	Calgary Flames	London Knights (OHL)
7	Manny Malhotra (C)	Canada	New York Rangers	Guelph Storm (OHL)
8	Mark Bell (C)	Canada	Chicago Blackhawks (from Toronto)^{4}	Ottawa 67s (OHL)
9	Michael Rupp (LW)	United States	New York Islanders	Erie Otters (OHL)
10	Nikolai Antropov (C)	Kazakhstan	Toronto Maple Leafs (from Chicago)^{5}	Torpedo Ust-Kamenogorsk (Kazakhstan)
11	Jeff Heerema (RW)	Canada	Carolina Hurricanes	Sarnia Sting (OHL)
12	Alex Tanguay (C)	Canada	Colorado Avalanche (from San Jose)^{6}	Halifax Mooseheads (QMJHL)
13	Michael Henrich (RW)	Canada	Edmonton Oilers	Barrie Colts (OHL)
14	Patrick DesRochers (G)	Canada	Phoenix Coyotes	Sarnia Sting (OHL)
15	Mathieu Chouinard (G)	Canada	Ottawa Senators	Shawinigan Cataractes (QMJHL)
16	Eric Chouinard (C)	Canada	Montreal Canadiens	Quebec Remparts (QMJHL)
17	Martin Skoula (D)	Czech Republic	Colorado Avalanche (from Los Angeles)^{7}	Barrie Colts (OHL)
18	Dmitri Kalinin (D)	Russia	Buffalo Sabres	Traktor Chelyabinsk (Russia)
19	Robyn Regehr (D)	Canada	Colorado Avalanche (from Boston)^{8}	Kamloops Blazers (WHL)
20	Scott Parker (RW)	United States	Colorado Avalanche (from Washington)^{9}	Kelowna Rockets (WHL)
21	Mathieu Biron (D)	Canada	Los Angeles Kings (from Colorado)^{10}	Shawinigan Cataractes (QMJHL)
22	Simon Gagne (C)	Canada	Philadelphia Flyers (from Philadelphia via Tampa Bay, compensatory)^{11}	Quebec Remparts (QMJHL)
23	Milan Kraft (RW)	Czech Republic	Pittsburgh Penguins	Keramika Plzen (Czech Republic)
24	Christian Backman (D)	Sweden	St. Louis Blues	Vastra Frolunda HC (Sweden)
25	Jiri Fischer (D)	Czech Republic	Detroit Red Wings	Hull Olympiques (QMJHL)
26	Mike Van Ryn (D)	Canada	New Jersey Devils	University of Michigan (CCHA)
27	Scott Gomez (C)	United States	New Jersey Devils (from Dallas)^{12}	Tri-City Americans (WHL)

1. San Jose's acquired first-round pick went to Tampa Bay as the result of a trade on March 24, 1998, that sent Bryan Marchment and David Shaw to San Jose in exchange for Andrei Nazarov and Tampa Bay's conditional right to swap first-round pick in the 1998 Entry Draft (this pick).
  San Jose previously acquired this pick as the result of a trade on November 13, 1997, that sent Viktor Kozlov and a conditional fifth-round pick in the 1998 Entry Draft to Florida in exchange for Dave Lowry and this pick.
2. San Jose's acquired first-round pick went to Nashville as the result of a trade on June 27, 1998, that sent a first-round (# 3 overall) and second-round picks in the 1998 Entry Draft to San Jose in exchange for a third-round pick in the 1998 Entry Draft and this pick.
  San Jose previously acquired this pick as the result of a trade on March 24, 1998, that sent Bryan Marchment and David Shaw to San Jose in exchange for Andrei Nazarov and Tampa Bay's conditional right to swap first-round pick in the 1998 Entry Draft (this pick).
3. Nashville's first-round pick went to San Jose as the result of a trade on June 27, 1998, that sent a first-round (# 2 overall) and third-round picks in the 1998 Entry Draft to Nashville in exchange for a second-round pick in the 1998 Entry Draft and this pick.
4. Toronto's first-round pick went to Chicago as the result of a trade on June 27, 1998, that sent a first-round pick (# 10 overall), a third-round pick and a fifth-round pick in the 1998 Entry Draft to Toronto in exchange for a fourth-round pick in the 1998 Entry Draft and this pick.
5. Chicago's first-round pick went to Toronto as the result of a trade on June 27, 1998, that sent a first-round pick (# 8 overall) and a fourth-round pick in the 1998 Entry Draft to Chicago in exchange for a third-round pick and a fifth-round pick in the 1998 Entry Draft along with this pick.
6. San Jose's first-round pick went to Colorado as the result of a trade on November 20, 1997, that sent Mike Ricci and a second-round pick in the 1998 Entry Draft to San Jose in exchange for Shean Donovan and this pick.
7. Los Angeles' first-round pick went to Colorado as the result of a trade on June 20, 1996, that sent Eric Lacroix and a first-round pick (# 21 overall) in the 1998 Entry Draft to Los Angeles in exchange for Stephane Fiset and this pick.
8. Boston's first-round pick went to Colorado as the result of a trade on November 22, 1996, that sent Anders Myrvold and Landon Wilson to Boston in exchange for this pick.
9. Washington's first-round pick went to Colorado as the result of a trade on November 2, 1996, that sent Curtis Leschyshyn and Chris Simon to Washington in exchange for Keith Jones, a fourth-round pick in the 1998 Entry Draft and this pick.
10. Colorado's first-round pick went to Los Angeles as the result of a trade on June 20, 1996, that sent Stephane Fiset and a first-round pick (# 17 overall) in the 1998 Entry Draft to Los Angeles in exchange for Eric Lacroix and this pick.
11. Philadelphia's first-round pick was re-acquired as the result of a trade on August 20, 1997, that sent Karl Dykhuis and Mikael Renberg to Tampa Bay in exchange for first-round picks in the 1999 entry draft, 2000 entry draft and 2001 entry draft along with this pick.
  Tampa Bay previously acquired this pick along with first-round picks in the 1999 entry draft, 2000 entry draft and 2001 entry draft as compensation on August 20, 1997, after Philadelphia signed Group II free agent Chris Gratton.
12. Dallas' first-round pick went to New Jersey as the result of a trade on June 27, 1998, that sent a two second-round picks (# 39 and # 57 overall) in the 1998 Entry Draft to Dallas in exchange for this pick.

=== Round two ===
Pick	Player	Nationality	NHL team	College/junior/club team
28	Ramzi Abid (LW)	Canada	Colorado Avalanche (from Tampa Bay)^{1}	Chicoutimi Sagueneens (QMJHL)
29	Jonathan Cheechoo (RW)	Canada	San Jose Sharks (from Nashville)^{2}	Belleville Bulls (OHL)
30	Kyle Rossiter (D)	Canada	Florida Panthers	Spokane Chiefs (WHL)
31	Artem Chubarov (C)	Russia	Vancouver Canucks	Dynamo Moscow (Russia)
32	Stephen Peat (RW)	Canada	Mighty Ducks of Anaheim	Red Deer Rebels (WHL)
33	Blair Betts (C)	Canada	Calgary Flames	Prince George Cougars (WHL)
34	Andrew Peters (LW)	Canada	Buffalo Sabres (from New York Rangers)^{3}	Oshawa Generals (OHL)
35	Petr Svoboda (D)	Czech Republic	Toronto Maple Leafs	BK Havlickuv Brod (Czech Republic)
36	Chris Nielsen (C)	Canada	New York Islanders	Calgary Hitmen (WHL)
37	Christian Berglund (C)	Sweden	New Jersey Devils (compensatory)^{4}	Farjestad BK (Sweden)
38	Philippe Sauve (G)	United States	Colorado Avalanche (from Chicago)^{5}	Rimouski Oceanic (QMJHL)
39	John Erskine (D)	Canada	Dallas Stars (from Carolina via New Jersey)^{6}	London Knights (OHL)
40	Randy Copley (LW)	Canada	New York Rangers (compensatory)^{7}	Cape Breton Screaming Eagles (QMJHL)
41	Maxym Linnik (D)	Ukraine	St. Louis Blues (from San Jose via Detroit)^{8}	St. Thomas Stars (GOJHL)
42	Jason Beckett (D)	Canada	Philadelphia Flyers (from Edmonton)^{9}	Seattle Thunderbirds (WHL)
43	Ossi Vaananen (D)	Finland	Phoenix Coyotes	Jokerit (Finland)
44	Mike Fisher (C)	Canada	Ottawa Senators	Sudbury Wolves (OHL)
45	Mike Ribeiro (C)	Canada	Montreal Canadiens	Rouyn-Noranda Huskies (QMJHL)
46	Justin Papineau (C)	Canada	Los Angeles Kings	Belleville Bulls (OHL)
47	Norm Milley (RW)	Canada	Buffalo Sabres	Sudbury Wolves (OHL)
48	Jonathan Girard (D)	Canada	Boston Bruins	Laval Titan College Francais (QMJHL)
49	Jomar Cruz (G)	Canada	Washington Capitals	Brandon Wheat Kings (WHL)
50	Jaroslav Kristek (RW)	Czech Republic	Buffalo Sabres (from Colorado via San Jose)^{10}	HC Zlin (Czech Republic)
51	Ian Forbes (D)	Canada	Philadelphia Flyers	Guelph Storm (OHL)
52	Bobby Allen (D)	United States	Boston Bruins (from Washington; compensatory)^{11}	Boston College (Hockey East)
53	Steve Moore (C)	Canada	Colorado Avalanche (compensatory)^{12}	Harvard University (ECAC)
54	Alexander Zevakhin (LW)	Russia	Pittsburgh Penguins	CSKA Moscow (Russia)
55	Ryan Barnes (LW)	Canada	Detroit Red Wings (from St. Louis)^{13}	Sudbury Wolves (OHL)
56	Tomek Valtonen (LW)	Finland	Detroit Red Wings	Ilves (Finland)
57	Tyler Bouck (RW)	Canada	Dallas Stars (from New Jersey)^{14}	Prince George Cougars (WHL)
58	Chris Bala (LW)	United States	Ottawa Senators (from Dallas via Philadelphia)^{15}	Harvard University (ECAC)

1. Tampa Bay's second-round pick went to Colorado as the result of a trade on July 29, 1996, that sent Craig Wolanin to Tampa Bay in exchange for this pick.
2. Nashville's second-round pick went to San Jose as the result of a trade on June 27, 1998, that sent a first-round (# 2 overall) and third-round picks in the 1998 Entry Draft to Nashville in exchange for a first-round pick (# 3 overall) in the 1998 Entry Draft and this pick.
3. The Rangers' second-round pick went to Buffalo as the result of a trade on September 29, 1997, that sent Pat LaFontaine to the Rangers in exchange for a conditional fifth-round pick in the 2000 entry draft and this pick.
4. New Jersey acquired this pick as compensation after failing to sign their first-round pick in the 1996 entry draft (Lance Ward).
5. Chicago's second-round pick went to Colorado as the result of a trade on July 10, 1996, that sent Tuomas Gronman to Chicago in exchange for this pick.
6. New Jersey's acquired second-round pick went to Dallas as the result of a trade on June 27, 1998, that sent a first-round pick in the 1998 Entry Draft to New Jersey in exchange for a second-round pick in the 1998 Entry Draft (# 57 overall) and this pick.
  New Jersey previously acquired this pick as the result of a trade on December 19, 1995, that sent Jim Dowd and a second-round pick in the 1997 entry draft to Hartford in exchange for Jocelyn Lemieux and this pick.
7. The Rangers acquired this pick as compensation on July 30, 1997, after Vancouver signed free agent Mark Messier.
8. Detroit's acquired second-round pick went to St. Louis as the result of a trade on June 27, 1998, that sent second-round (# 55 overall) and fourth-round picks in the 1998 Entry Draft to Detroit in exchange for this pick.
  Detroit previously acquired this pick as the result of a trade on August 18, 1997, that sent Mike Vernon and a fifth-round pick in the 1999 entry draft to San Jose in exchange for a second-round pick in the 1999 entry draft and this pick.
9. Edmonton's second-round pick went to Philadelphia as the result of a trade on March 24, 1998, that sent Janne Niinimaa to Edmonton in exchange for Dan McGillis and this pick.
10. San Jose's acquired second-round pick went to Buffalo as the result of a trade on June 18, 1998, that sent Steve Shields and a fourth-round pick in the 1998 Entry Draft to San Jose in exchange for Kay Whitmore, a fifth-round pick in the 2000 entry draft and this pick.
  San Jose previously acquired this pick as the result of a trade on November 20, 1997, that sent Shean Donovan and a first-round pick in the 1998 Entry Draft to Colorado in exchange for Mike Ricci and this pick.
11. Washington's second-round pick went to Boston as the result of a trade on March 1, 1997, that sent Adam Oates, Bill Ranford and Rick Tocchet to Washington in exchange for Jason Allison, Jim Carey, Anson Carter, a third-round pick in the 1997 entry draft and this pick. This pick was a conditional pick and the conditions was if Washington were able to re-sign Rick Tocchet as a free agent. He signed with the Phoenix Coyotes on July 23, 1997, and Washington got a compensation pick in the 1998 Entry Draft that still went to Boston to complete the trade.
12. Colorado acquired this pick as compensation after failing to sign their first-round pick in the 1996 entry draft (Peter Ratchuk).
13. St. Louis' second-round pick went to Detroit as the result of a trade on June 27, 1998, that sent a second-round pick (# 41 overall) in the 1998 Entry Draft in exchange for a fourth-round pick in the 1998 Entry Draft and this pick.
14. New Jersey's second-round pick went to Dallas as the result of a trade on June 27, 1998, that sent a first-round pick in the 1998 Entry Draft to New Jersey in exchange for a second-round pick in the 1998 Entry Draft (# 39 overall) and this pick.
15. Philadelphia's acquired second-round pick went to Ottawa as the result of a trade on January 17, 1998, that sent Alexandre Daigle to Philadelphia in exchange for Pat Falloon, Vaclav Prospal and this pick.
  Philadelphia previously acquired this pick as the result of a trade on June 21, 1997, that sent a third-round pick in the 1997 entry draft to Dallas in exchange for this pick.

=== Round three ===
Pick	Player	Nationality	NHL team	College/junior/club team
59	Todd Hornung (C)	Canada	Washington Capitals (from Tampa Bay)^{1}	Portland Winter Hawks (WHL)
60	Denis Arkhipov (C)	Russia	Nashville Predators	Ak Bars Kazan (Russia)
61	Joe DiPenta (D)	Canada	Florida Panthers	Boston University (Hockey East)
62	Paul Manning (D)	Canada	Calgary Flames (from Vancouver via Carolina)^{2}	Colorado College (WCHA)
63	Lance Ward (D)	Canada	Florida Panthers (from Anaheim via Colorado)^{3}	Red Deer Rebels (WHL)
64	Brad Richards (C)	Canada	Tampa Bay Lightning (from Calgary)^{4}	Rimouski Oceanic (QMJHL)
65	Eric Laplante (LW)	Canada	San Jose Sharks (compensatory)^{5}	Halifax Mooseheads (QMJHL)
66	Jason LaBarbera (G)	Canada	New York Rangers	Portland Winter Hawks (WHL)
67	Alex Henry (D)	Canada	Edmonton Oilers (from Toronto via Tampa Bay)^{6}	London Knights (OHL)
68	Jarkko Ruutu (LW)	Finland	Vancouver Canucks (from New York Islanders)^{7}	HIFK (Finland)
69	Jamie Hodson (G)	Canada	Toronto Maple Leafs (from Chicago)^{8}	Brandon Wheat Kings (WHL)
70	Kevin Holdridge (D)	Canada	Carolina Hurricanes	Plymouth Whalers (OHL)
71	Erik Cole (LW)	United States	Carolina Hurricanes (from San Jose)^{9}	Clarkson University (ECAC)
72	Dmitri Afanasenkov (LW)	Russia	Tampa Bay Lightning (from Edmonton)^{10}	Torpedo Yaroslavl (Russia)
73	Pat O'Leary (C)	United States	Phoenix Coyotes	Robbinsdale High School (USHS–MN)
74	Julien Vauclair (D)	Switzerland	Ottawa Senators	HC Lugano (Switzerland)
75	Francois Beauchemin (D)	Canada	Montreal Canadiens	Laval Titan College Francais (QMJHL)
76	Aleksei Volkov (G)	Russia	Los Angeles Kings	Krylya Sovetov-2 (Russia)
77	Mike Pandolfo (RW)	United States	Buffalo Sabres	Saint Sebastian's School (USHS–MA)
78	Peter Nordstrom (LW)	Sweden	Boston Bruins	Farjestad BK (Sweden)
79	Yevgeni Lazarev (LW)	Russia	Colorado Avalanche (from Washington)^{11}	Kitchener Dutchmen (MWJHL)
80	David Cameron (C)	Canada	Pittsburgh Penguins (from Colorado)^{12}	Prince Albert Raiders (WHL)
81	Justin Morrison (RW)	United States	Vancouver Canucks (from Philadelphia)^{13}	Colorado College (WCHA)
82	Brian Gionta (RW)	United States	New Jersey Devils (from Pittsburgh via Edmonton)^{14}	Boston College (Hockey East)
83	Matt Walker (D)	Canada	St. Louis Blues	Portland Winter Hawks (WHL)
84	Jake McCracken (G)	Canada	Detroit Red Wings	Sault Ste. Marie Greyhounds (OHL)
85	Geoff Koch (LW)	United States	Nashville Predators (from New Jersey via San Jose)^{15}	University of Michigan (CCHA)
86	Gabriel Karlsson (C)	Sweden	Dallas Stars	HV71 (Sweden)

1. Tampa Bay's third-round pick went to Washington as the result of a trade on June 18, 1998, that sent Bill Ranford to Tampa Bay in exchange for a second-round pick in the 1999 entry draft and this pick.
2. Carolina's acquired third-round pick went to Calgary as the result of a trade on March 5, 1997, that sent Steve Chiasson and a third-round pick in the 1997 entry draft to Hartford in exchange for Hnat Domenichelli, Glen Featherstone, a second-round pick in the 1998 Entry Draft and this pick. Hartford relocated to Raleigh to become the Carolina Hurricanes after the 1996–97 NHL season.
  Hartford previously acquired this pick as the result of a trade on December 19, 1995, that sent Jim Dowd, Frantisek Kucera and a second-round pick in the 1997 entry draft to Vancouver in exchange for Jeff Brown and this pick.
3. Colorado's acquired third-round pick went to Florida as the result of a trade on March 23, 1998, that sent Tom Fitzgerald to Colorado in exchange for the rights to Mark Parrish and this pick.
  Colorado previously acquired this pick as the result of a trade on September 17, 1997, that sent Scott Young to Anaheim in exchange for this pick.
4. Calgary's third-round pick went to Tampa Bay as the result of a trade on March 24, 1998, that sent Jason Wiemer to Calgary in exchange for Sandy McCarthy, a fifth-round pick in the 1998 Entry Draft and this pick.
5. San Jose acquired this pick as compensation on July 2, 1997, after Dallas signed free agent Ed Belfour.
6. Tampa Bay's acquired third-round pick went to Edmonton as the result of a trade on July 16, 1997, that sent Brantt Myhres and a third-round pick (# 72 overall) in the 1998 Entry Draft to Tampa Bay in exchange for Vladimir Vujtek and this pick.
  Tampa Bay previously acquired this pick as the result of a trade on January 31, 1997, that sent Craig Wolanin to Toronto in exchange for this pick.
7. The Islanders' third-round pick went to Vancouver as the result of a trade on February 6, 1998, that sent Trevor Linden to the Islanders in exchange for Todd Bertuzzi, Bryan McCabe and this pick.
8. Chicago's third-round pick went to Toronto as the result of a trade on June 27, 1998, that sent a first-round pick (# 8 overall) and a fourth-round pick in the 1998 Entry Draft to Chicago in exchange for a first-round pick (# 10 overall) and a fifth-round pick in the 1998 Entry Draft along with this pick.
9. San Jose's third-round pick went to Carolina as the result of a trade on June 21, 1997, that sent a first-round in the 1997 Entry Draft to San Jose in exchange for a second-round pick in the 1997 entry draft and this pick.
10. Edmonton's third-round pick went to Tampa Bay as the result of a trade on July 16, 1997, that sent Vladimir Vujtek and a third-round pick (# 67 overall) in the 1998 Entry Draft to Edmonton in exchange for Brantt Myhres and this pick.
11. Washington's third-round pick went to Colorado as the result of a trade on June 27, 1998, that sent a two fourth-round picks (# 106 & 107 overall) and a fifth-round pick in the 1998 Entry Draft to Washington in exchange for this pick.
12. Colorado's third-round pick went to Pittsburgh as the result of a trade on September 28, 1997, that sent Francois Leroux to Colorado in exchange for this pick.
13. Philadelphia's third-round pick went to Vancouver as the result of a trade on March 24, 1998, that sent Dave Babych and a fifth-round pick in the 1998 Entry Draft to Philadelphia in exchange for this pick.
14. Edmonton's acquired third-round pick went to New Jersey as the result of a trade on June 27, 1998, that sent the rights to Fredrik Bremberg, a fourth-round and fifth-round picks in the 1998 Entry Draft to Edmonton in exchange for this pick.
  Edmonton previously acquired this pick as the result of a trade on August 12, 1997, that sent Jiri Slegr to Pittsburgh in exchange for this pick.
15. San Jose's acquired third-round pick went to Nashville as the result of a trade on June 27, 1998, that sent first-round and second-round picks in the 1998 Entry Draft to San Jose in exchange for a first-round pick in the 1998 Entry Draft and this pick.
  San Jose previously acquired this pick as the result of a trade on August 22, 1997, that sent Vlastimil Kroupa to New Jersey in exchange for this pick.

=== Round four ===
#	Player	Nationality	NHL team	College/junior/club team
87	Alexei Ponikarovsky (C)	Ukraine	Toronto Maple Leafs (from Tampa Bay via Detroit)^{1}	Dynamo Moscow-2 (Russia)
88	Kent Sauer (D)	United States	Nashville Predators	North Iowa Huskies (USHL)
89	Ryan Jardine (RW)	Canada	Florida Panthers	Sault Ste. Marie Greyhounds (OHL)
90	Regan Darby (D)	Canada	Vancouver Canucks	Tri-City Americans (WHL)
91	Josef Vasicek (C)	Czech Republic	Carolina Hurricanes (from Anaheim)^{2}	Slavia Prague (Czech Republic)
92	Eric Beaudoin (LW)	Canada	Tampa Bay Lightning (from Calgary)^{3}	Guelph Storm (OHL)
93	Tommy Westlund (RW)	Sweden	Carolina Hurricanes (from New York Rangers)^{4}	Brynas IF (Sweden)
94	Matthias Trattnig (C)	Austria	Chicago Blackhawks (from Toronto)^{5}	University of Maine (Hockey East)
95	Andy Burnham (RW)	Canada	New York Islanders	Windsor Spitfires (OHL)
96	Mikko Jokela (D)	Finland	New Jersey Devils (from Chicago)^{6}	HIFK (Finland)
97	Chris Madden (G)	United States	Carolina Hurricanes	Guelph Storm (OHL)
98	Rob Davison (D)	Canada	San Jose Sharks	North Bay Centennials (OHL)
99	Shawn Horcoff (C)	Canada	Edmonton Oilers	Michigan State University (CCHA)
100	Ryan Van Buskirk (D)	Canada	Phoenix Coyotes	Sarnia Sting (OHL)
101	Petr Schastlivy (LW)	Russia	Ottawa Senators	Torpedo Yaroslavl (Russia)
102	Shaun Sutter (RW)	Canada	Calgary Flames (from Montreal)^{7}	Lethbridge Hurricanes (WHL)
103	Kip Brennan (LW)	Canada	Los Angeles Kings	Sudbury Wolves (OHL)
104	Miroslav Zalesak (RW)	Slovakia	San Jose Sharks (from Buffalo)^{8}	Plastika Nitra (Slovakia)
105	Pierre Dagenais (LW)	Canada	New Jersey Devils (from Boston via Los Angeles)^{9}	Rouyn-Noranda Huskies (QMJHL)
106	Krys Barch (RW)	Canada	Washington Capitals (from Washington via Colorado)^{10}	London Knights (OHL)
107	Chris Corrinet (LW)	United States	Washington Capitals (from Colorado)^{11}	Princeton University (ECAC)
108	Dany Sabourin (G)	Canada	Calgary Flames (compensatory)^{12}	Sherbrooke Faucons (QMJHL)
109	J. P. Morin (D)	Canada	Philadelphia Flyers	Drummondville Voltigeurs (QMJHL)
110	Scott Myers (G)	Canada	Pittsburgh Penguins	Prince George Cougars (WHL)
111	Brent Hobday (LW)	Canada	Detroit Red Wings (from St. Louis)^{13}	Moose Jaw Warriors (WHL)
112	Viktor Wallin (D)	Sweden	Mighty Ducks of Anaheim (from Detroit)^{14}	HV71 (Sweden)
113	Kristian Antila (G)	Finland	Edmonton Oilers (from New Jersey)^{15}	Ilves Jr. (Finland)
114	Boyd Kane (LW)	Canada	New York Rangers (from Dallas)^{16}	Regina Pats (WHL)

1. Detroit's acquired fourth-round pick went to Toronto as the result of a trade on March 24, 1998, that sent Jamie Macoun to Detroit in exchange for this pick.
  Detroit previously acquired this pick as the result of a trade on August 27, 1996, that sent Dino Ciccarelli to Tampa Bay in exchange for this pick.
2. Anaheim's fourth-round pick went to Carolina as the result of a trade on March 18, 1997, that sent Mark Janssens to Anaheim in exchange for Bates Battaglia and this pick. Hartford relocated to Raleigh to become the Carolina Hurricanes after the 1996–97 NHL season.
3. Calgary's fourth-round pick went to Tampa Bay as the result of a trade on June 21, 1997, that sent Rick Tabaracci to Calgary in exchange for this pick.
4. The Rangers' fourth-round pick went to Carolina as the result of a trade on August 8, 1997, that sent Jason Muzzatti to the Rangers in exchange for this pick.
5. Toronto's fourth-round pick went to Chicago as the result of a trade on June 27, 1998, that sent a first-round pick (# 10 overall), a third-round pick and a fifth-round pick in the 1998 Entry Draft to Toronto in exchange for a first-round pick (# 8 overall) in the 1998 Entry Draft and this pick.
6. Chicago's fourth-round pick went to New Jersey as the result of a trade on January 8, 1998, that sent Reid Simpson to Chicago in exchange for future considerations and this pick.
7. Montreal's fourth-round pick went to Calgary as the result of a trade on February 1, 1998, that sent Jonas Hoglund and Zarley Zalapski to Montreal in exchange for Valeri Bure and this pick.
8. Buffalo's fourth-round pick went to San Jose as the result of a trade on June 18, 1998, that sent Kay Whitmore, a second-round pick in the 1998 Entry Draft and a fifth-round pick in the 200 entry draft in exchange for Steve Shields and this pick.
9. Los Angeles' acquired fourth-round pick went to New Jersey as the result of a trade on June 18, 1998, that sent Doug Bodger to Los Angeles in exchange for this pick.
  Los Angeles previously acquired this pick as the result of a trade on August 29, 1997, that sent Byron Dafoe and Dmitri Khristich to Boston in exchange for Sandy Moger, Jozef Stumpel and this pick.
10. Washington's fourth-round pick was re-acquired as the result of a trade on June 27, 1998, that sent a third-round pick in the 1998 Entry Draft to Colorado in exchange a fourth-round pick (# 107 overall) and fifth-round pick in the 1998 Entry Draft along with this pick.
  Edmonton previously acquired this pick as the result of a trade on November 2, 1996, that sent Curtis Leschyshyn and Chris Simon to Washington in exchange for Keith Jones, a first-round pick in the 1998 Entry Draft and this pick.
11. Colorado's fourth-round pick went to Washington as the result of a trade on June 27, 1998, that sent a third-round pick in the 1998 Entry Draft to Colorado in exchange a fourth-round pick (# 106 overall) and fifth-round pick in the 1998 Entry Draft along with this pick.
12. Calgary acquired this pick as compensation on July 12, 1997, after Florida signed free agent Dave Gagner.
13. St. Louis' second-round pick went to Detroit as the result of a trade on June 27, 1998, that sent a second-round pick (# 41 overall) in the 1998 Entry Draft in exchange for a second-round pick (# 55 overall) in the 1998 Entry Draft and this pick.
14. Detroit's fourth-round pick went to Anaheim as the result of a trade on March 24, 1998, that sent Dmitri Mironov to Detroit in exchange for Jamie Pushor and this pick.
15. New Jersey's fourth-round pick went to Edmonton as the result of a trade on June 27, 1998, that sent a third-round pick in the 1998 Entry Draft to New Jersey in exchange for the rights to Fredrik Bremberg, a fifth-round pick in the 1998 Entry Draft and this pick.
16. Dallas' fourth-round pick went to the Rangers as the result of a trade on March 24, 1998, that sent Mike Keane, Brian Skrudland and a conditional sixth-round pick in the 1998 Entry Draft or 1999 entry draft to Dallas in exchange for Bob Errey, Todd Harvey and this pick.

=== Round five ===
#	Player	Nationality	NHL team	College/junior/club team
115	Jay Leach (D)	United States	Phoenix Coyotes (from Tampa Bay)^{1}	Providence College (Hockey East)
116	Josh Blackburn (G)	United States	Phoenix Coyotes (from Nashville via San Jose)^{2}	Lincoln Stars (USHL)
117	Jaroslav Spacek (D)	Czech Republic	Florida Panthers (from Florida via San Jose)^{3}	Farjestad BK (Sweden)
118	Mike Siklenka (D)	Canada	Washington Capitals (from Colorado; compensatory)^{4}	Lloydminster Blazers (AJHL)
119	Anton But	Russia	New Jersey Devils (from Vancouver)^{5}	Torpedo-2 Yaroslavl (Russia)
120	Brent Gauvreau (C)	Canada	Calgary Flames (from Anaheim)^{6}	Oshawa Generals (OHL)
121	Curtis Rich (D)	Canada	Tampa Bay Lightning (from Calgary)^{7}	Calgary Hitmen (WHL)
122	Pat Leahy (RW)	United States	New York Rangers	Miami University (CCHA)
123	Jiri Dopita (C)	Czech Republic	New York Islanders (from Toronto)^{8}	Petra Vsetin (Czech Republic)
124	Francis Belanger (LW)	Canada	Philadelphia Flyers (from New York Islanders via Chicago)^{9}	Rimouski Oceanic (QMJHL)
125	Erik Wendell	United States	Washington Capitals (from Chicago)^{10}	Maple Grove Senior High School (USHS–MN)
126	Morgan Warren (RW)	Canada	Toronto Maple Leafs (from Carolina via Chicago)^{11}	Moncton Wildcats (QMJHL)
127	Brandon Coalter (LW)	Canada	San Jose Sharks	Oshawa Generals (OHL)
128	Paul Elliott (D)	Canada	Edmonton Oilers	Lethbridge Hurricanes (WHL)
129	Robert Schnabel (D)	Czech Republic	Phoenix Coyotes	Red Deer Rebels (WHL)
130	Gavin McLeod (D)	Canada	Ottawa Senators	Kelowna Rockets (WHL)
131	Tomas Kloucek (D)	Czech Republic	New York Rangers (compensatory)^{12}	Slavia Prague (Czech Republic)
132	Andrei Bashkirov (LW)	Russia	Montreal Canadiens	Fort Wayne Komets (IHL)
133	Joe Rullier (D)	Canada	Los Angeles Kings	Rimouski Oceanic (QMJHL)
134	Rob Scuderi (D)	United States	Pittsburgh Penguins (from Buffalo)^{13}	Boston College (Hockey East)
135	Andrew Raycroft (G)	Canada	Boston Bruins	Sudbury Wolves (OHL)
136	David Ytfeldt (D)	Sweden	Vancouver Canucks (from Washington)^{14}	Leksands IF (Sweden)
137	Aaron Goldade (C)	Canada	Buffalo Sabres (compensatory)^{15}	Brandon Wheat Kings (WHL)
138	Martin Beauchesne (D)	Canada	Nashville Predators (from Colorado)^{16}	Sherbrooke Faucons (QMJHL)
139	Garrett Prosofsky (C)	Canada	Philadelphia Flyers (from Philadelphia via Vancouver)^{17}	Saskatoon Blades (WHL)
140	Rick Bertran (D)	Canada	Vancouver Canucks (from Pittsburgh)^{18}	Kitchener Rangers (OHL)
141	K. C. Timmons (LW)	Canada	Colorado Avalanche (from St. Louis)^{19}	Tri-City Americans (WHL)
142	Calle Steen	Sweden	Detroit Red Wings	Hammarby IF (Sweden)
143	Ryan Flinn (LW)	Canada	New Jersey Devils (compensatory)^{20}	Laval Titan College Francais (QMJHL)
144	Oleg Smirnov (LW)	Russia	Edmonton Oilers (from New Jersey)^{21}	Kristall Elektrostal (WPHL)
145	Mikael Samuelsson (RW)	Sweden	San Jose Sharks (from Dallas)^{22}	Sodertalje SK (Sweden)

1. Tampa Bay's fifth-round pick went to Phoenix as the result of a trade on June 11, 1998, that sent Craig Janney to Vancouver in exchange for Louie DeBrusk and this pick.
2. San Jose's acquired fifth-round pick went to Phoenix as the result of a trade on June 27, 1998, that sent a fifth-round pick in the 1999 entry draft to San Jose in exchange for a this pick.
  San Jose previously acquired this pick as the result of a trade on June 26, 1998, that sent Ville Peltonen to Nashville in exchange for this pick.
3. Florida's conditional pick was re-acquired as the result of a trade on November 13, 1997, that sent Dave Lowry and a first-round pick in the 1998 Entry Draft to San Jose in exchange for Viktor Kozlov and this pick.
  San Jose previously acquired this pick as the result of a trade on March 3, 1995, that sent Johan Garpenlov to Florida in exchange for a conditional pick in the 1998 Entry Draft (this pick). Conditions of this draft pick are unknown.
4. Colorado's acquired fifth-round pick went to Washington as the result of a trade on June 27, 1998, that sent a third-round pick in the 1998 Entry Draft to Colorado in exchange for two a fourth-round picks (# 106 & 107 overall) and this pick.
  Colorado acquired this pick as compensation on July 30, 1997, after the Rangers signed free agent Mike Keane.
5. Vancouver's fifth-round pick went to New Jersey as the result of a trade on February 5, 1998, that sent Peter Zezel to Vancouver in exchange for this pick.
6. Calgary acquired this pick as compensation on August 9, 1997, after Anaheim hired Pierre Page as head coach.
7. Calgary's fifth-round pick went to Tampa Bay as the result of a trade on March 24, 1998, that sent Jason Wiemer to Calgary in exchange for Sandy McCarthy, a third-round pick in the 1998 Entry Draft and this pick.
8. Toronto's fifth-round pick went to the Islanders as the result of a trade on October 10, 1996, that sent Darby Hendrickson to Toronto in exchange for a conditional fifth-round pick (this pick) or sixth-round pick. Conditions of this draft pick are unknown.
9. Chicago's acquired fifth-round pick went to Philadelphia as the result of a trade on June 27, 1998, that sent Paul Coffey to Chicago in exchange for a this pick.
  Chicago previously acquired this pick as the result of a trade on May 30, 1998, that sent Dmitri Nabokov to the Islanders in exchange for Jean-Pierre Dumont and this pick.
10. Chicago's fifth-round pick went to Washington as the result of a trade on October 10, 1997, that sent Martin Gendron and a sixth-round pick in the 1998 Entry Draft to Chicago in exchange for this pick.
11. Chicago's acquired fifth-round pick went to Toronto as the result of a trade on June 27, 1998, that sent a first-round pick (# 8 overall) and a fourth-round pick in the 1998 Entry Draft to Chicago in exchange for a first-round pick (# 10 overall) and a third-round pick in the 1998 Entry Draft along with this pick.
  Chicago previously acquired this pick as the result of a trade on July 25, 1997, that sent Enrico Ciccone to Carolina in exchange for Enrico Ciccone and this pick.
12. The Rangers acquired this pick as compensation on August 8, 1997, after Toronto signed free agent Glenn Healy.
13. Buffalo's fifth-round pick went to Pittsburgh as the result of a trade on September 24, 1997, that sent Jason Woolley to Buffalo in exchange for this pick.
14. Vancouver acquired this pick as compensation on June 9, 1997, after Washington hired George McPhee as General Manager.
15. Buffalo acquired this pick as compensation on July 15, 1997, after Los Angeles signed free agent Garry Galley.
16. Colorado's fifth-round pick went to Nashville as the result of a trade on June 26, 1998, that sent future considerations (Nashville agreed to not select certain unspecified player(s) in the 1998 NHL expansion draft) to Colorado in exchange for this pick.
17. Philadelphia fifth-round pick was re-acquired as the result of a trade on March 24, 1998, that sent a third-round pick in the 1998 Entry Draft to Vancouver in exchange for Dave Babych and this pick.
  Vancouver previously acquired this pick as the result of a trade on February 5, 1998, that sent Mike Sillinger to Philadelphia in exchange for this pick.
18. Pittsburgh's fifth-round pick went to Vancouver as the result of a trade on March 18, 1997, that sent Josef Beranek to Pittsburgh in exchange for future considerations (this pick).
19. St. Louis' third-round pick went to Colorado as the result of a trade on June 21, 1997, that sent two fourth-round picks in the 1996 entry draft (# 98 and # 106 overall) to St. Louis in exchange for a third-round pick in the 1997 entry draft and this pick.
20. New Jersey acquired this pick as compensation on July 29, 1997, after Boston signed free agent Dave Ellett.
21. New Jersey's fourth-round pick went to Edmonton as the result of a trade on June 27, 1998, that sent a third-round pick in the 1998 Entry Draft to New Jersey in exchange for the rights to Fredrik Bremberg, a fourth-round pick in the 1998 Entry Draft and this pick.
22. Dallas' fifth-round pick went to San Jose as the result of a trade on August 15, 1996, that sent Sergei Gorbachev to Dallas in exchange for this pick.

=== Round six ===
#	Player	Nationality	NHL team	College/junior/club team
146	Sergei Kuznetsov (C)	Russia	Tampa Bay Lightning	Torpedo-2 Yaroslavl (Russia)
147	Craig Brunel (RW)	United States	Nashville Predators	Prince Albert Raiders(WHL)
148	Chris Ovington (D)	Canada	Florida Panthers	Red Deer Rebels (WHL)
149	Paul Cabana	Canada	Vancouver Canucks	Fort McMurray Oil Barons (AJHL)
150	Trent Hunter (RW)	Canada	Mighty Ducks of Anaheim	Prince George Cougars (WHL)
151	Adam Deleeuw (LW)	Canada	Detroit Red Wings (compensatory)^{1}	Barrie Colts (OHL)
152	Gordie Dwyer (LW)	Canada	Montreal Canadiens (from Calgary)^{2}	Beauport Harfangs (QMJHL)
153	Pavel Patera (LW)	Czech Republic	Dallas Stars (from New York Rangers)^{3}	AIK IF (Sweden)
154	Allan Rourke (D)	Canada	Toronto Maple Leafs	Kitchener Rangers (OHL)
155	Kevin Clauson (D)	United States	New York Islanders	Western Michigan University (CCHA)
156	Kent Huskins (D)	Canada	Chicago Blackhawks	Clarkson University (ECAC)
157	Brad Voth (D)	Canada	St. Louis Blues (from Carolina)^{4}	Medicine Hat Tigers (WHL)
158	Jari Viuhkola (C)	Finland	Chicago Blackhawks (from San Jose)^{5}	Karpat (Finland)
159	Trevor Ettinger (D)	Canada	Edmonton Oilers	Cape Breton Screaming Eagles (QHL)
160	Rickard Wallin (C)	Sweden	Phoenix Coyotes	Farjestad BK Jr. (Sweden)
161	Chris Neil (RW)	Canada	Ottawa Senators (from Ottawa via Chicago)^{6}	North Bay Centennials (OHL)
162	Andrei Markov (C)	Russia	Montreal Canadiens	Khimik Voskresensk (Russia)
163	Tomas Zizka (D)	Czech Republic	Los Angeles Kings	ZPS Zlin (Czech Republic)
164	Ales Kotalik	Czech Republic	Buffalo Sabres	HC Ceske Budejovice Jr. (Czech Republic)
165	Ryan Milanovic (LW)	Canada	Boston Bruins	Kitchener Rangers (OHL)
166	Jonathan Pelletier (G)	Canada	Chicago Blackhawks (from Washington)^{7}	Drummondville Voltigeurs (QMJHL)
167	Alex Riazantsev (D)	Russia	Colorado Avalanche	Victoriaville Tigres (QMJHL)
168	Antero Niittymaki (G)	Finland	Philadelphia Flyers	TPS Jr. (Finland)
169	Jan Fadrny (C)	Czech Republic	Pittsburgh Penguins	Slavia Prague (Czech Republic)
170	Andrei Troschinsky (C)	Kazakhstan	St. Louis Blues	Torpedo Ust-Kamenogorsk (Kazakhstan)
171	Pavel Datsyuk (C)	Russia	Detroit Red Wings	Dinamo-Energija Yekaterinburg (Russia)
172	Jacques Lariviere (LW)	Canada	New Jersey Devils	Moncton Wildcats (QMJHL)
173	Niko Kapanen (C)	Finland	Dallas Stars	HPK (Finland)

1. Detroit acquired this pick as compensation on October 20, 1997, after Anaheim signed free agent Tomas Sandstrom.
2. Calgary's sixth-round pick went to Montreal as the result of a trade on October 24, 1996, that sent Scott Fraser to Calgary in exchange for David Ling and this pick.
3. The Rangers' sixth-round pick went to Dallas as the result of a trade on March 24, 1998, that sent Bob Errey, Todd Harvey and a fourth-round pick in the 1998 Entry Draft to the Rangers in exchange for Mike Keane, Brian Skrudland and a conditional sixth-round pick in the 1998 Entry Draft (this pick) or 1999 entry draft. Conditions of this draft pick are unknown.
4. Carolina's sixth-round pick went to St. Louis as the result of a trade on June 27, 1997, that sent Stephen Leach to Carolina in exchange for Alexander Godynyuk and this pick.
5. San Jose's sixth-round pick went to Chicago as the result of a trade on July 25, 1997, that sent Murray Craven to San Jose in exchange for Petri Varis and this pick.
6. Ottawa's sixth-round pick was re-acquired as the result of a trade on September 24, 1997, that sent Kirk Daubenspeck to Chicago in exchange for future considerations and this pick.
  Chicago previously acquired this pick as the result of a trade on March 18, 1997, that sent Mike Prokopec to Ottawa in exchange for Denis Chasse, rights to Kevin Bolibruck and this pick.
7. Washington's sixth-round pick went to Chicago as the result of a trade on October 10, 1997, that sent a fifth-round pick in the 1998 Entry Draft to Washington in exchange for Martin Gendron and this pick.

=== Round seven ===
#	Player	Nationality	NHL team	College/junior/club team
174	Brett Allan	Canada	Tampa Bay Lightning	Swift Current Broncos (WHL)
175	Cam Ondrik (G)	Canada	Philadelphia Flyers (from Nashville)^{1}	Medicine Hat Tigers (WHL)
176	B. J. Ketcheson (D)	Canada	Florida Panthers	Peterborough Petes (OHL)
177	Vincent Malts (RW)	United States	Vancouver Canucks	Hull Olympiques (QMJHL)
178	Jesse Fibiger (D)	Canada	Mighty Ducks of Anaheim	University of Minnesota Duluth (WCHA)
179	Nathan Forster (D)	Canada	Washington Capitals (from Calgary)^{2}	Seattle Thunderbirds (WHL)
180	Stefan Lundqvist (RW)	Sweden	New York Rangers	Brynas IF (Sweden)
181	Jonathan Gagnon (C)	Canada	Toronto Maple Leafs	Cape Breton Screaming Eagles (QMJHL)
182	Evgeny Korolev (D)	Russia	New York Islanders	London Knights (OHL)
183	Tyler Arnason (C)	United States	Chicago Blackhawks	St. Cloud State University (WCHA)
184	Donald Smith (C)	United States	Carolina Hurricanes	Clarkson University (ECAC)
185	Robert Mulick (D)	Canada	San Jose Sharks	Sault Ste. Marie Greyhounds (OHL)
186	Mike Morrison (G)	United States	Edmonton Oilers	University of Maine (Hockey East)
187	Erik Westrum (C)	United States	Phoenix Coyotes	University of Minnesota (WCHA)
188	Michel Periard (D)	Canada	Ottawa Senators	Shawinigan Cataractes (QMJHL)
189	Andrei Kruchinin (D)	Russia	Montreal Canadiens	Lada Togliatti (Russia)
190	Tommi Hannus (C)	Finland	Los Angeles Kings	TPS Jr. (Finland)
191	Brad Moran (C)	Canada	Buffalo Sabres	Calgary Hitmen (WHL)
192	Radek Duda (RW)	Czech Republic	Calgary Flames (from Boston)^{3}	Sparta Prague (Czech Republic)
193	Rastislav Stana (G)	Slovakia	Washington Capitals	HC Kosice (Slovakia)
194	Oak Hewer (C)	Canada	Tampa Bay Lightning (from Colorado)^{4}	North Bay Centennials (OHL)
195	Tomas Divisek	Czech Republic	Philadelphia Flyers	Slavia Prague (Czech Republic)
196	Joel Scherban (C)	Canada	Pittsburgh Penguins	London Knights (OHL)
197	Brad Twordik (C)	Canada	St. Louis Blues	Brandon Wheat Kings (WHL)
198	Jeremy Goetzinger (D)	Canada	Detroit Red Wings	Prince Albert Raiders (WHL)
199	Erik Jensen	United States	New Jersey Devils	Des Moines Buccaneers (USHL)
200	Scott Perry (C)	United States	Dallas Stars	Boston University (Hockey East)

1. Nashville's seventh-round pick went to Philadelphia as the result of a trade on June 26, 1998, that sent Dominic Roussel and Jeff Staples to Nashville in exchange for this pick.
2. Calgary's seventh-round pick went to Washington as the result of a trade on September 4, 1997, that sent Eric Charron to Calgary in exchange for future considerations (this pick).
3. Boston's seventh-round pick went to Calgary as the result of a trade on June 21, 1997, that sent Mike Sullivan to Boston in exchange for this pick.
4. Colorado's seventh-round pick went to Tampa Bay as the result of a trade on June 27, 1998, that sent a sixth-round pick in the 1999 entry draft to Colorado in exchange for an eighth and a ninth-round in the 1998 Entry Draft along with this pick.

=== Round eight ===
#	Player	Nationality	NHL team	College/junior/club team
201	Craig Murray (C)	Canada	Montreal Canadiens (from Tampa Bay)^{1}	University of Michigan (CCHA)
202	Martin Bartek (LW)	Slovakia	Nashville Predators	Sherbrooke Faucons (QMJHL)
203	Ian Jacobs (RW)	Canada	Florida Panthers	Ottawa 67's (OHL)
204	Craig Mischler (C)	United States	Vancouver Canucks	Northeastern University (Hockey East)
205	David Bernier (RW)	Canada	Mighty Ducks of Anaheim	Quebec Ramparts (QMJHL)
206	Jonas Frogren (D)	Sweden	Calgary Flames	Farjestad BK (Sweden)
207	Johan Witehall (LW)	Sweden	New York Rangers	Leksands IF (Sweden)
208	Jaroslav Svoboda (RW)	Czech Republic	Carolina Hurricanes (from Toronto)^{2}	HC Olomouc (Czech Republic)
209	Frederick Brind'Amour (G)	Canada	New York Islanders	Sherbrooke Faucons (QMJHL)
210	Sean Griffin (D)	Canada	Chicago Blackhawks	Kingston Frontenacs (OHL)
211	Mark Kosick (C)	Canada	Carolina Hurricanes	University of Michigan (CCHA)
212	Jim Fahey (D)	United States	San Jose Sharks	Northeastern University (Hockey East)
213	Christian Lefebvre (D)	Canada	Edmonton Oilers	Baie-Comeau Drakkar (QMJHL)
214	Justin Hansen (RW)	Canada	Phoenix Coyotes	Prince George Cougars (WHL)
215	Dwight Wolfe (D)	Canada	Toronto Maple Leafs (from Ottawa)^{3}	Halifax Mooseheads (QMJHL)
216	Michael Ryder (RW)	Canada	Montreal Canadiens	Hull Olympiques (QMJHL)
217	Jim Henkel (C)	United States	Los Angeles Kings	Ottawa 67's (OHL)
218	David Moravec (LW)	Czech Republic	Buffalo Sabres	HC Vitkovice (Czech Republic)
219	Curtis Valentine (LW)	Canada	Vancouver Canucks (from Boston)^{4}	Bowling Green University (CCHA)
220	Mike Farrell (D)	United States	Washington Capitals	Providence College (Hockey East)
221	Daniel Hulak (D)	Canada	Tampa Bay Lightning (from Colorado)^{5}	Swift Current Broncos (WHL)
222	Lubomir Pistek (RW)	Slovakia	Philadelphia Flyers	Kelowna Rockets (WHL)
223	Sergei Verenikin (RW)	Russia	Ottawa Senators (from San Jose; compensatory)^{6}	Torpedo Yaroslavl (Russia)
224	Mika Lehto (G)	Finland	Pittsburgh Penguins	Assat (Finland)
225	Yevgeni Pastukh (LW)	Ukraine	St. Louis Blues	Khimik Voskresensk (Russia)
226	David Petrasek (D)	Sweden	Detroit Red Wings	HV71 (Sweden)
227	Marko Ahosilta (C)	Finland	New Jersey Devils	KalPa Kuopio (Finland)
228	Michal Travnicek	Czech Republic	Toronto Maple Leafs (from Dallas)^{7}	Chemopetrol Litvinov (Czech Republic)

1. Montreal acquired this pick as compensation on February 1, 1998, after Tampa Bay hired Jacques Demers as head coach.
2. Toronto's eighth-round pick went to Carolina as the result of a trade on March 18, 1997, that sent Kelly Chase to Toronto in exchange for this pick. Hartford relocated to Raleigh to become the Carolina Hurricanes after the 1996–97 NHL season.
3. Ottawa's eighth-round pick went to Toronto as the result of a trade on March 17, 1998, that sent Per Gustafsson to Ottawa in exchange for this pick.
4. Boston's eighth-round pick went to Vancouver as the result of a trade on March 3, 1998, that sent Grant Ledyard to Boston in exchange for this pick.
5. Colorado's eighth-round pick went to Tampa Bay as the result of a trade on June 27, 1998, that sent a sixth-round pick in the 1999 entry draft to Colorado in exchange for a seventh and a ninth-round in the 1998 Entry Draft along with this pick.
6. San Jose's acquired eighth-round pick went to Ottawa as the result of a trade on June 27, 1998, that sent an eighth-round pick in the 1999 entry draft to San Jose in exchange for this pick.
  San Jose acquired this pick as compensation on July 28, 1997, after Dallas signed free agent Bob Errey.
7. Dallas' eighth-round pick went to Toronto as the result of a trade on March 24, 1998, that sent Mike Kennedy to Dallas in exchange for this pick.

=== Round nine ===
#	Player	Nationality	NHL team	College/junior/club team
229	Chris Lyness (D)	Canada	Tampa Bay Lightning	Cape Breton Screaming Eagles (QMJHL)
230	Karlis Skrastins (D)	Latvia	Nashville Predators	TPS Turku (Finland)
231	Adrian Wichser (C)	Switzerland	Florida Panthers	EHC Kloten (Switzerland)
232	Jason Metcalfe (D)	Canada	Vancouver Canucks	London Knights (OHL)
233	Pelle Prestberg (LW)	Sweden	Mighty Ducks of Anaheim	Farjestad Karlstad (Sweden)
234	Kevin Mitchell (D)	United States	Calgary Flames	Guelph Storm (OHL)
235	Jan Mertzig (D)	Sweden	New York Rangers	Luleå (Sweden)
236	Sergei Rostov (G)	Russia	Toronto Maple Leafs	Dynamo-2 Moscow (Russia)
237	Ben Blais (D)	United States	New York Islanders	Walpole High School (USHS-Massachusetts)
238	Alexandre Couture (LW)	Canada	Chicago Blackhawks	Sherbrooke Faucons (QMJHL)
239	Brent McDonald (C)	Canada	Carolina Hurricanes	Prince George Cougars (WHL)
240	Andrei Yershov (D)	Russia	Chicago Blackhawks (from San Jose)^{1}	Khimik Voskresensk (Russia)
241	Maxim Spiridonov (RW)	Russia	Edmonton Oilers	London Knights (OHL)
242	Jason Doyle (RW)	Canada	New York Islanders (from Phoenix)^{2}	Sault Ste. Marie Greyhounds (OHL)
243	Petr Hubacek (C)	Czech Republic	Philadelphia Flyers (compensatory)^{3}	Kometa Brno (Czech Republic)
244	Toby Petersen (C)	United States	Pittsburgh Penguins (compensatory)^{4}	Colorado College (WCHA)
245	Andreas Andersson (G)	Sweden	Mighty Ducks of Anaheim (compensatory)^{5}	HV71 (Sweden)
246	Rastislav Pavlikovsky (C)	Slovakia	Ottawa Senators	Dukla Trencin (Slovakia)
247	Darcy Harris (RW)	Canada	Montreal Canadiens	Kitchener Rangers (OHL)
248	Matthew Yeats (G)	Canada	Los Angeles Kings	Olds Grizzlys (AJHL)
249	Edo Terglav (RW)	Slovenia	Buffalo Sabres	Baie-Comeau Drakkar (QMJHL)
250	Radek Matejovsky (RW)	Czech Republic	New York Islanders (from Boston)^{6}	Slavia Prague (Czech Republic)
251	Blake Evans (C)	Canada	Washington Capitals	Tri-City Americans (WHL)
252	Martin Cibak (C)	Slovakia	Tampa Bay Lightning (from Colorado)^{7}	Medicine Hat Tigers (WHL)
253	Bruno St. Jacques (D)	Canada	Philadelphia Flyers	Baie-Comeau Drakkar (QMJHL)
254	Matt Hussey (C)	United States	Pittsburgh Penguins	Avon Old Farms (USHS–CT)
255	John Pohl (C)	United States	St. Louis Blues	University of Minnesota (CCHA)
256	Petja Pietilainen (C)	Finland	Detroit Red Wings	Saskatoon Blades (WHL)
257	Ryan Held (C)	Canada	New Jersey Devils	Kitchener Rangers (OHL)
258	Sergei Skrobot (D)	Russia	Philadelphia Flyers (from Dallas)^{8}	Dynamo Moscow-2 (Russia)

1. San Jose's ninth-round pick went to Chicago as the result of a trade on June 27, 1998, that sent the rights to Gary Suter to San Jose in exchange for this pick.
2. Phoenix's ninth-round pick went to the Islanders as the result of a trade on March 24, 1998, that sent Mark Janssens to Phoenix in exchange for this pick.
3. Philadelphia acquired this pick as compensation on November 25, 1997, after Phoenix signed free agent Michel Petit.
4. Pittsburgh acquired this pick as compensation on October 2, 1997, after Dallas signed free agent Craig Muni.
5. Anaheim acquired this pick as compensation on March 21, 1998, after Washington signed free agent Brian Bellows.
6. Boston's ninth-round pick went to the Islanders as the result of a trade on June 27, 1998, that sent a ninth-round pick in the 1999 entry draft to Boston in exchange for this pick.
7. Colorado's ninth-round pick went to Tampa Bay as the result of a trade on June 27, 1998, that sent a sixth-round pick in the 1999 entry draft to Colorado in exchange for a seventh and an eighth-round in the 1998 Entry Draft along with this pick.
8. Dallas' ninth-round pick went to Philadelphia as the result of a trade on June 27, 1998, that sent a ninth-round pick in the 1999 entry draft to Dallas in exchange for this pick.

== Draftees based on nationality ==
Rank	Country	Amount
	North America	171
1	Canada	133
2	United States	38
	Europe	87
3	Russia	22
4	Czech Republic	21
5	Sweden	17
6	Finland	12
7	Slovakia	6
8	Kazakhstan	2
8	Ukraine	2
8	Switzerland	2
11	Austria	1
11	Latvia	1
11	Slovenia	1

== See also ==
- 1998 NHL expansion draft
- 1998–99 NHL season
- List of NHL first overall draft choices
- List of NHL players
