= Robert Mulick =

Canadian ice hockey player

- Born: October 23, 1979 (age 46) Toronto, Ontario, Canada
- Height: 6 ft 2 in (188 cm)
- Weight: 205 lb (93 kg; 14 st 9 lb)
- Position: Defence
- Shot: Right
- Played for: Kentucky Thoroughblades; Cleveland Barons; HC Bolzano; SG Cortina
- NHL draft: 185th overall, 1998; San Jose Sharks
- Playing career: 1999–2009

Robert Mulick (born October 23, 1979) is a Canadian former professional ice hockey defenceman.

== Career ==
Prior to his pro career he played four seasons of junior hockey for the Sault Ste. Marie Greyhounds of the Ontario Hockey League and served as team captain his final season. He was drafted by the San Jose Sharks in the 1998 NHL entry draft and played five seasons in the American Hockey League, spending two seasons with the Kentucky Thoroughblades and three seasons with the Cleveland Barons.

After becoming a free agent, Mulick went on to play five seasons in Italy's Serie A. He spent one season with HC Bolzano and four seasons with SG Cortina. He won a Serie A championship in 2007 with SG Cortina.

== Career statistics ==
			Regular season					Playoffs
Season	Team	League	GP	G	A	Pts	PIM	GP	G	A	Pts	PIM
1995–96	Sault Ste. Marie Greyhounds	OHL	54	0	3	3	58	3	0	0	0	0
1996–97	Sault Ste. Marie Greyhounds	OHL	60	2	8	10	49	11	0	1	1	12
1997–98	Sault Ste. Marie Greyhounds	OHL	61	0	10	10	109	—	—	—	—	—
1998–99	Sault Ste. Marie Greyhounds	OHL	66	1	12	13	83	5	0	1	1	10
1999–00	Kentucky Thoroughblades	AHL	52	0	0	0	52	9	0	0	0	10
2000–01	Kentucky Thoroughblades	AHL	71	0	6	6	55	2	0	0	0	0
2001–02	Cleveland Barons	AHL	60	0	2	2	77	—	—	—	—	—
2002–03	Cleveland Barons	AHL	24	0	0	0	14	—	—	—	—	—
2003–04	Cleveland Barons	AHL	63	1	5	6	26	3	0	0	0	2
2004–05	HC Bolzano	Italy	36	1	5	6	28	10	0	3	3	8
2005–06	SG Cortina	Italy	32	2	3	5	59	—	—	—	—	—
2006–07	SG Cortina	Italy	31	1	3	4	34	8	0	0	0	10
2007–08	SG Cortina	Italy	32	1	3	4	36	3	0	0	0	8
2008–09	SG Cortina	Italy	20	0	0	0	24	—	—	—	—	—
AHL totals			270	1	13	14	224	14	0	0	0	12
Italy totals			151	5	14	19	181	21	0	3	3	26
