= Marko Ahosilta =

Finnish ice hockey player (born 1980)

- Born: January 24, 1980 (age 46) Kuopio, Finland
- Height: 5 ft 9 in (175 cm)
- Weight: 194 lb (88 kg; 13 st 12 lb)
- Position: Left wing
- Shot: Left
- Played for: KalPa
- NHL draft: 227th overall, 1998; New Jersey Devils
- Playing career: 2001–2007

Marko Ahosilta (born January 24, 1980) is a Finnish former professional ice hockey left wing. He played in the SM-liiga for KalPa. He was drafted 227th overall by the New Jersey Devils in the 1998 NHL entry draft.
