= Alexander Zevakhin =

Russian ice hockey player

- Born: June 4, 1980 (age 46) Perm, USSR
- Height: 6 ft 0 in (183 cm)
- Weight: 203 lb (92 kg; 14 st 7 lb)
- Position: Right wing
- Shot: Left
- VHL team Former teams: Titan Klin; HC CSKA Moscow; Wilkes-Barre/Scranton Penguins; Amur Khabarovsk; SKA St. Petersburg; Salavat Yulaev Ufa; HC MVD; Torpedo Nizhny Novgorod; Severstal Cherepovets; Molot-Prikamye Perm; HC Ryazan
- NHL draft: 54th overall, 1998; Pittsburgh Penguins
- Playing career: 1996–2012

Alexander Vladimirovich Zevakhin (Russian: Александр Владимирович Зевахин; born June 4, 1980) is a Russian professional ice hockey right winger who last played for Titan Klin in the Russian Major League. He was drafted 54th overall in the 1998 NHL entry draft by the Pittsburgh Penguins.

== Career statistics ==
			Regular season					Playoffs
Season	Team	League	GP	G	A	Pts	PIM	GP	G	A	Pts	PIM
1995–96	HC CSKA Moscow-2	Russia2	5	3	1	4	0	—	—	—	—	—
1996–97	HC CSKA Moscow	Russia2	12	5	2	7	4	—	—	—	—	—
1996–97	HC CSKA Moscow-2	Russia3	26	7	3	10	12	—	—	—	—	—
1997–98	HC CSKA Moscow	Russia	10	1	0	1	0	—	—	—	—	—
1997–98	HC CSKA Moscow-2	Russia3	28	10	14	24	18	—	—	—	—	—
1998–99	HC CSKA Moscow	Russia	42	7	4	11	16	3	0	0	0	0
1999–00	HC CSKA Moscow	Russia	15	1	0	1	6	—	—	—	—	—
1999–00	HC CSKA Moscow-2	Russia3	1	3	0	3	2	—	—	—	—	—
2000–01	Wilkes-Barre/Scranton Penguins	AHL	77	14	11	25	16	21	2	4	6	0
2001–02	Wilkes-Barre/Scranton Penguins	AHL	74	7	16	23	29	—	—	—	—	—
2002–03	Wilkes-Barre/Scranton Penguins	AHL	13	4	2	6	2	—	—	—	—	—
2002–03	HC CSKA Moscow	Russia	11	0	0	0	2	—	—	—	—	—
2003–04	Amur Khabarovsk	Russia	43	3	3	6	28	—	—	—	—	—
2003–04	Amur Khabarovsk-2	Russia3	4	5	3	8	2	—	—	—	—	—
2004–05	SKA Saint Petersburg	Russia	9	1	1	2	4	—	—	—	—	—
2004–05	SKA Saint Petersburg-2	Russia3	1	0	0	0	0	—	—	—	—	—
2004–05	Salavat Yulaev Ufa	Russia	36	4	1	5	14	—	—	—	—	—
2005–06	HC MVD	Russia	42	5	4	9	34	4	0	0	0	14
2006–07	HC MVD	Russia	53	11	11	22	26	3	0	0	0	4
2007–08	Torpedo Nizhny Novgorod	Russia	29	6	6	12	30	—	—	—	—	—
2007–08	Torpedo Nizhny Novgorod-2	Russia3	6	3	6	9	35	—	—	—	—	—
2008–09	Severstal Cherepovets	KHL	44	3	6	9	32	—	—	—	—	—
2009–10	Severstal Cherepovets	KHL	20	1	1	2	12	—	—	—	—	—
2009–10	Molot-Prikamye Perm	Russia2	4	0	1	1	4	10	2	0	2	4
2010–11	HC Ryazan	VHL	6	1	0	1	4	—	—	—	—	—
2010–11	Molot-Prikamye Perm	VHL	6	1	1	2	4	—	—	—	—	—
2011–12	Titan Klin	VHL	27	6	2	8	28	—	—	—	—	—
AHL totals			164	25	29	54	47	21	2	4	6	0
Russia totals			290	39	30	69	160	27	2	1	3	24
