= Gabriel Karlsson =

Swedish ice hockey player (born 1980)

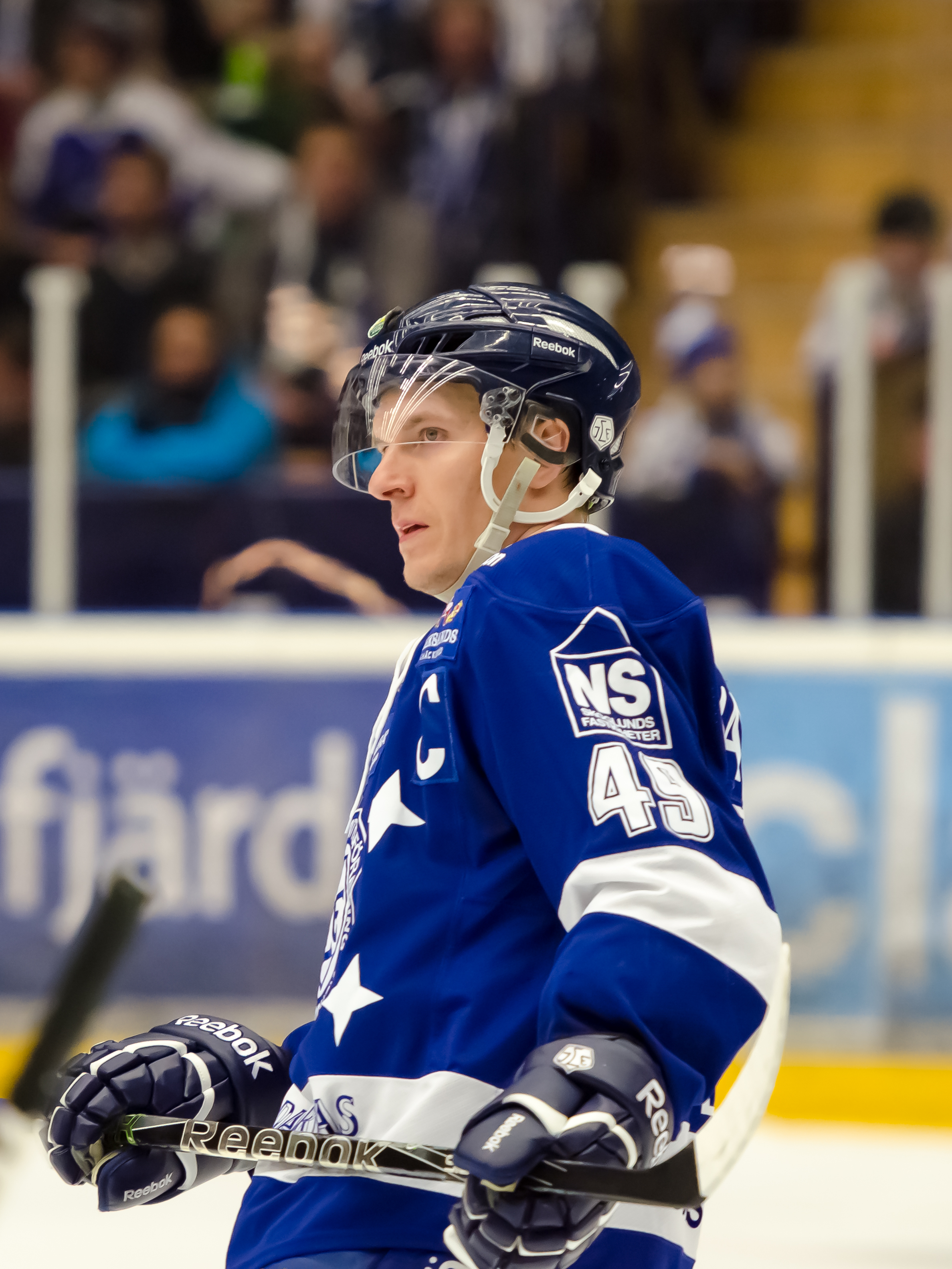
- Born: 22 January 1980 (age 46) Borlänge, Sweden
- Height: 6 ft 1 in (185 cm)
- Weight: 205 lb (93 kg; 14 st 9 lb)
- Position: Centre
- Shot: Left
- team Former teams: Ludvika HF; HV71; Ässät (SM-liiga); Södertälje SK; Skellefteå AIK; Timrå IK; Leksands IF
- NHL draft: 86th overall, 1998; Dallas Stars
- Playing career: 1998–2014

Gabriel Karlsson Pears (born 22 January 1980) is a Swedish former professional ice hockey player who last played for Leksands IF in the SHL.

== Career statistics ==
| | | | Regular season | | | | | Playoffs |
| Season | Team | League | GP | G | A | Pts | PIM | GP | G | A | Pts | PIM |
|---|---|---|---|---|---|---|---|---|---|---|---|---|
| 1996–97 | HV71 J18 | J18 Elit | — | — | — | — | — | — | — | — | — | — |
| 1996–97 | HV71 J20 | J20 SuperElit | 25 | 7 | 9 | 16 | — | — | — | — | — | — |
| 1997–98 | HV71 J18 | J18 Div.1 | — | — | — | — | — | — | — | — | — | — |
| 1997–98 | HV71 J20 | J20 SuperElit | 27 | 11 | 15 | 26 | 32 | — | — | — | — | — |
| 1997–98 | HV71 | Elitserien | 1 | 0 | 0 | 0 | 0 | — | — | — | — | — |
| 1998–99 | HV71 J20 | J20 SuperElit | — | — | — | — | — | — | — | — | — | — |
| 1998–99 | HV71 | Elitserien | 33 | 2 | 1 | 3 | 2 | — | — | — | — | — |
| 1999–00 | HV71 | Elitserien | 50 | 5 | 3 | 8 | 12 | 6 | 0 | 0 | 0 | 2 |
| 2000–01 | Porin Ässät | SM-liiga | 17 | 2 | 2 | 4 | 6 | — | — | — | — | — |
| 2000–01 | Leksands IF | Elitserien | 35 | 9 | 8 | 17 | 10 | — | — | — | — | — |
| 2001–02 | Södertälje SK | Elitserien | 47 | 8 | 7 | 15 | 18 | — | — | — | — | — |
| 2002–03 | Södertälje SK | Elitserien | 39 | 4 | 3 | 7 | 12 | — | — | — | — | — |
| 2003–04 | Södertälje SK J20 | J20 SuperElit | 3 | 1 | 3 | 4 | 2 | — | — | — | — | — |
| 2003–04 | Södertälje SK | Elitserien | 50 | 7 | 10 | 17 | 65 | — | — | — | — | — |
| 2004–05 | Södertälje SK J20 | J20 SuperElit | 1 | 0 | 0 | 0 | 0 | — | — | — | — | — |
| 2004–05 | Södertälje SK | Elitserien | 44 | 3 | 6 | 9 | 14 | 9 | 0 | 0 | 0 | 0 |
| 2005–06 | Södertälje SK | Elitserien | 47 | 2 | 9 | 11 | 20 | — | — | — | — | — |
| 2006–07 | Leksands IF | HockeyAllsvenskan | 39 | 10 | 16 | 26 | 18 | 10 | 1 | 2 | 3 | 14 |
| 2007–08 | Leksands IF | HockeyAllsvenskan | 44 | 11 | 34 | 45 | 22 | 10 | 4 | 2 | 6 | 6 |
| 2008–09 | Skellefteå AIK | Elitserien | 53 | 13 | 17 | 30 | 16 | 11 | 1 | 2 | 3 | 2 |
| 2009–10 | Timrå IK | Elitserien | 50 | 7 | 17 | 24 | 34 | 4 | 0 | 3 | 3 | 4 |
| 2010–11 | Timrå IK | Elitserien | 49 | 7 | 15 | 22 | 22 | — | — | — | — | — |
| 2011–12 | Leksands IF | HockeyAllsvenskan | 47 | 7 | 16 | 23 | 16 | 10 | 1 | 2 | 3 | 0 |
| 2012–13 | Leksands IF | HockeyAllsvenskan | 48 | 3 | 10 | 13 | 20 | 9 | 3 | 4 | 7 | 2 |
| 2013–14 | Leksands IF | SHL | 54 | 5 | 7 | 12 | 6 | 3 | 0 | 0 | 0 | 0 |
| 2014–15 | Ludvika HF | Division 2 | — | — | — | — | — | 1 | 1 | 0 | 1 | 2 |
| 2015–16 | Ludvika HF | Division 2 | 1 | 0 | 2 | 2 | 0 | — | — | — | — | — |
| 2019–20 | Hedemora SK | Division 2 | — | — | — | — | — | 4 | 4 | 3 | 7 | 0 |
| 2022–23 | Skedvi/Säter IF | Division 2 | — | — | — | — | — | 6 | 2 | 0 | 2 | 0 |
| SHL (Elitserien) totals | | | 552 | 72 | 103 | 175 | 231 | 52 | 2 | 9 | 11 | 14 |
| SM-liiga totals | | | 17 | 2 | 2 | 4 | 6 | — | — | — | — | — |
| HockeyAllsvenskan totals | | | 178 | 31 | 76 | 107 | 76 | 39 | 9 | 10 | 19 | 22 |
