= Stefan Lundqvist =

Swedish ice hockey player

- Born: February 18, 1978 (age 48) Krylbo, SWE
- Height: 6 ft 3 in (191 cm)
- Weight: 214 lb (97 kg; 15 st 4 lb)
- Position: Right wing
- Shot: Left
- Played for: Brynäs IF
- NHL draft: 180th overall, 1998; New York Rangers
- Playing career: 1995–2009

Stefan Lundqvist (born February 18, 1978) is a Swedish former professional ice hockey player. He played in the Elitserien for Brynäs IF. He was drafted 180th overall in the 1998 NHL entry draft by the New York Rangers.
