= Andrei Yershov =

Russian ice hockey player

- Born: August 22, 1976 (age 50) Voskresensk, USSR
- Height: 6 ft 0 in (183 cm)
- Weight: 176 lb (80 kg; 12 st 8 lb)
- Position: Defence
- Shot: Left
- Played for: Khimik Voskresensk; HC Lada Togliatti; Vityaz Chekhov; HC Dmitrov; HC Ryazan; Molot-Prikamye Perm; HC Arystan
- NHL draft: 240th overall, 1998; Chicago Blackhawks
- Playing career: 1994–2013

Andrei Yershov (born August 22, 1976) is a Russian professional ice hockey defenceman currently playing for HC Arystan in the Kazakhstan Vyschaya Liga. He played in the Russian Superleague for Khimik Voskresensk, HC Lada Togliatti and Vityaz Chekhov. He was drafted 240th overall in the 1998 NHL entry draft by the Chicago Blackhawks.

== Career statistics ==
			Regular season					Playoffs
Season	Team	League	GP	G	A	Pts	PIM	GP	G	A	Pts	PIM
1993–94	Sokol Lukhovitsy	Russia3	39	9	4	13	66	—	—	—	—	—
1994–95	Buran Voronezh	Russia2	23	4	5	9	53	—	—	—	—	—
1994–95	Khimik Voskresensk	Russia	16	0	0	0	6	—	—	—	—	—
1994–95	Sokol Lokhovitsy	Russia4	—	—	—	—	—	4	1	0	1	28
1995–96	Khimik Voskresensk	Russia	36	1	0	1	28	—	—	—	—	—
1996–97	Khimik Voskresensk	Russia	23	3	1	4	32	2	0	0	0	2
1997–98	Khimik Voskresensk	Russia	45	5	9	14	61	1	0	0	0	2
1998–99	Khimik Voskresensk	Russia	34	6	6	12	88	—	—	—	—	—
1999–00	HC Lada Togliatti	Russia	10	0	1	1	12	3	0	0	0	6
1999–00	HC Lada Togliatti-2	Russia3	6	0	2	2	2	—	—	—	—	—
2000–01	HC Vityaz Podolsk	Russia	27	1	5	6	32	—	—	—	—	—
2000–01	HC Vityaz Podolsk-2	Russia3	3	1	1	2	4	—	—	—	—	—
2001–02	Khimik Voskresensk	Russia2	54	16	11	27	99	10	2	4	6	2
2001–02	Khimik Voskresensk-2	Russia3	1	0	1	1	4	—	—	—	—	—
2002–03	Khimik Voskresensk	Russia2	46	3	8	11	36	14	1	1	2	12
2002–03	Khimik Voskresensk-2	Russia3	1	1	1	2	0	—	—	—	—	—
2003–04	Khimik Voskresensk	Russia	28	1	4	5	24	—	—	—	—	—
2003–04	Khimik Voskresensk-2	Russia3	1	0	0	0	0	—	—	—	—	—
2004–05	Gazovik Tyumen	Russia2	14	0	0	0	6	—	—	—	—	—
2004–05	Khimik Voskresensk-2	MosJHL	6	0	2	2	8	—	—	—	—	—
2004–05	HC Ryazan	Russia4	4	2	2	4	2	—	—	—	—	—
2005–06	Khimik Voskresensk	Russia2	36	1	4	5	40	—	—	—	—	—
2005–06	Khimik Voskresensk-2	Russia3	9	1	2	3	12	—	—	—	—	—
2005–06	HC Dmitrov	Russia2	8	3	4	7	12	4	1	0	1	8
2006–07	HC Dmitrov	Russia2	43	10	12	22	86	6	0	2	2	8
2007–08	HC Dmitrov	Russia2	42	8	8	16	69	4	0	1	1	10
2008–09	HC Ryazan	Russia2	64	14	16	30	133	7	0	0	0	33
2009–10	Molot-Prikamye Perm	Russia2	44	4	8	12	52	11	1	0	1	10
2010–11	HC Ryazan	VHL	21	1	5	6	28	—	—	—	—	—
2010–11	Arystan Temirtau	Kazakhstan	18	4	6	10	24	4	0	2	2	12
2011–12	Arystan Temirtau	Kazakhstan	49	15	10	25	75	10	0	2	2	32
2012–13	Arystan Temirtau	Kazakhstan	48	5	10	15	40	13	4	3	7	18
Russia totals			219	17	26	43	283	6	0	0	0	10
Kazakhstan totals			115	24	26	50	139	27	4	7	11	62
Russia2 totals			374	63	76	139	586	56	5	8	13	83
