= Sergei Verenkin =

Russian ice hockey forward

- Born: September 8, 1979 (age 46) Angarsk, Russian SFSR, Soviet Union
- Height: 5 ft 11 in (180 cm)
- Weight: 187 lb (85 kg; 13 st 5 lb)
- Position: Right wing
- Shot: Left
- Played for: Torpedo Yaroslavl; Metallurg Novokuznetsk; Molot-Prikamye Perm
- NHL draft: 223rd overall, 1998; Ottawa Senators
- Playing career: 1994–2003

Sergei Verenkin (born 8 September 1979) is a Russian former ice hockey left winger. He was selected 223rd overall by the Ottawa Senators in the 1998 NHL entry draft.

Verenkin played in the Russian Superleague for Torpedo Yaroslavl, Metallurg Novokuznetsk and Molot-Prikamye Perm.
