= Kristian Antila =

Finnish ice hockey player (1980–2024)

- Born: 10 January 1980 Vammala, Finland
- Died: 4 November 2024 (aged 44)
- Height: 6 ft 3 in (191 cm)
- Weight: 205 lb (93 kg; 14 st 9 lb)
- Position: Goaltender
- Caught: Left
- Played for: Ilves; Ässät; Hamilton Bulldogs; Wichita Thunder; Columbus Cottonmouths; AIK IF; Luleå HF
- NHL draft: 113th overall, 1998; Edmonton Oilers
- Playing career: 1999–2005

Kristian Antila (10 January 1980 – 4 November 2024) was a Finnish professional ice hockey goaltender. He played in the SM-liiga for Ilves and Ässät. He was drafted 113th overall by the Edmonton Oilers in the 1998 NHL entry draft. He retired in 2005 due to a groin injury. Antila died on 4 November 2024, at the age of 44.
