= Mike Siklenka =

Canadian ice hockey player

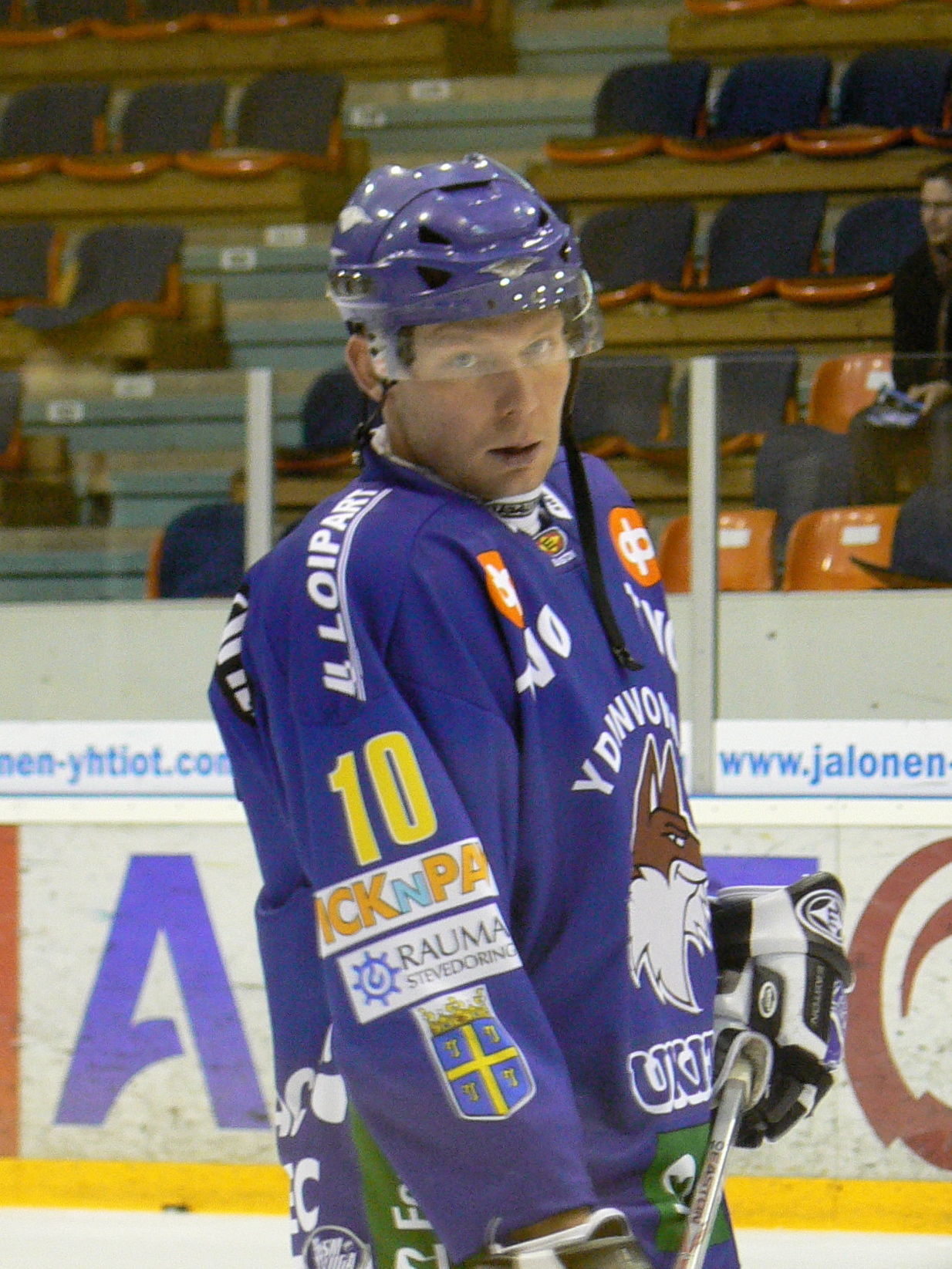
- Born: December 18, 1979 (age 46) Meadow Lake, Saskatchewan, Canada
- Height: 6 ft 4 in (193 cm)
- Weight: 223 lb (101 kg; 15 st 13 lb)
- Position: Defence
- Shot: Right
- Played for: Philadelphia Flyers; New York Rangers; Leksands IF; Lukko; EC Red Bull Salzburg; EC KAC
- NHL draft: 118th overall, 1998; Washington Capitals
- Playing career: 1999–2015

Michael Siklenka (born December 18, 1979) is a Canadian former professional ice hockey defenceman who played in the National Hockey League (NHL) for the Philadelphia Flyers and New York Rangers.

== Playing career ==
Siklenka was played major junior hockey with the Seattle Thunderbirds of the Western Hockey League before he was drafted 118th overall in the 1998 NHL entry draft by the Washington Capitals.

He played in two NHL games, one with the Philadelphia Flyers and the other with the New York Rangers before opting for a European career in playing for Leksands IF of the Swedish Allsvenskan, Lukko of the Finnish SM-liiga, and EC KAC and EC Red Bull Salzburg of the Austrian EBEL.

On July 2, 2010, Siklenka signed a one-year contract with the Atlanta Thrashers of the NHL. He was unable to make the Thrashers opening night roster and was reassigned to American Hockey League affiliate, the Chicago Wolves, to start the 2010–11 season. 36 games with the Wolves, Siklenka sought a release from his contract and returned for a second spell with EC KAC of the EBEL on January 27, 2011.

Siklenka was a member of Team Canada for the 2007 Spengler Cup.

== Personal life ==
Siklenka has a wife (Jolene) and two children (Rain and Jones).

== Career statistics ==
			Regular season					Playoffs
Season	Team	League	GP	G	A	Pts	PIM	GP	G	A	Pts	PIM
1997–98	Lloydminster Blazers	SJHL	54	10	17	27	120	—	—	—	—	—
1997–98	Seattle Thunderbirds	WHL	1	0	0	0	0	5	0	0	0	6
1998–99	Seattle Thunderbirds	WHL	68	19	13	32	115	11	6	6	12	24
1999–00	Portland Pirates	AHL	9	0	0	0	14	—	—	—	—	—
1999–00	Hampton Roads Admirals	ECHL	58	7	4	11	62	8	1	0	1	2
2000–01	Portland Pirates	AHL	3	0	0	0	0	—	—	—	—	—
2000–01	Richmond Renegades	ECHL	65	19	18	37	117	4	0	0	0	34
2001–02	Portland Pirates	AHL	8	1	0	1	2	—	—	—	—	—
2001–02	Richmond Renegades	ECHL	55	13	21	34	111	—	—	—	—	—
2002–03	Philadelphia Flyers	NHL	1	0	0	0	0	—	—	—	—	—
2002–03	Philadelphia Phantoms	AHL	64	6	6	12	169	—	—	—	—	—
2003–04	New York Rangers	NHL	1	0	0	0	0	—	—	—	—	—
2003–04	Philadelphia Phantoms	AHL	18	1	5	6	29	—	—	—	—	—
2003–04	Trenton Titans	ECHL	1	1	0	1	0	—	—	—	—	—
2003–04	Utah Grizzlies	AHL	26	3	6	9	74	—	—	—	—	—
2004–05	Klagenfurter AC	EBEL	39	16	18	34	156	12	6	1	7	44
2005–06	Klagenfurter AC	EBEL	42	13	32	45	206	—	—	—	—	—
2006–07	Leksands IF	Allsvenskan	39	12	19	31	164	8	0	4	4	14
2007–08	Lukko	Liiga	43	9	14	23	182	3	0	1	1	6
2008–09	EC Salzburg	EBEL	21	4	10	14	38	13	2	1	3	16
2009–10	EC Salzburg	EBEL	49	24	24	48	64	16	6	7	13	10
2010–11	Chicago Wolves	AHL	36	3	10	13	38	—	—	—	—	—
2010–11	Klagenfurter AC	EBEL	7	1	1	2	16	15	4	6	10	28
2011–12	Klagenfurter AC	EBEL	45	10	22	32	104	10	2	2	4	51
2012–13	Klagenfurter AC	EBEL	33	3	15	18	123	13	5	3	8	19
2013–14	Klagenfurter AC	EBEL	50	9	14	23	120	—	—	—	—	—
2014–15	Klagenfurter AC	EBEL	35	4	10	14	93	—	—	—	—	—
NHL totals			2	0	0	0	0	—	—	—	—	—
AHL totals			164	14	27	41	326	—	—	—	—	—
ECHL totals			179	40	43	83	290	12	1	0	1	49
