= Oleg Smirnov (ice hockey) =

Russian ice hockey player

- Born: April 8, 1980 (age 46) Pavlovsky Posad, Soviet Union
- Height: 5 ft 11 in (180 cm)
- Weight: 196 lb (89 kg; 14 st 0 lb)
- Position: Left wing
- Shot: Right
- VHL team Former teams: HC Ryazan; Kristall Elektrostal; HC Lipetsk; HC Spartak Moscow; HC Dynamo Moscow; HC CSKA Moscow; Metallurg Novokuznetsk
- NHL draft: 144th overall, 1998; Edmonton Oilers
- Playing career: 1998–2012

Oleg Vyacheslavovich Smirnov (Russian: Олег Вячеславович Смирнов; born April 8, 1980) is a Russian professional ice hockey right winger currently playing for HC Ryazan in the Russian Major League.

== Career ==
Smirnov was drafted 144th overall in the 1998 NHL entry draft by the Edmonton Oilers. He played in the Russian Superleague for Kristall Elektrostal, HC Lipetsk, HC Spartak Moscow, HC Dynamo Moscow, HC CSKA Moscow and Metallurg Novokuznetsk.

== Career statistics ==
			Regular season					Playoffs
Season	Team	League	GP	G	A	Pts	PIM	GP	G	A	Pts	PIM
1996–97	Kristall Elektrostal-2	Russia3	55	7	12	19	16	—	—	—	—	—
1997–98	Kristall Elektrostal	Russia	6	0	2	2	0	—	—	—	—	—
1997–98	Kristall Elektrostal-2	Russia3	23	5	9	14	12	—	—	—	—	—
1998–99	HC Spartak Moscow	Russia	14	4	0	4	4	—	—	—	—	—
1999–00	HC Spartak Moscow	Russia2	35	10	20	30	10	14	4	5	9	2
2000–01	HC Dynamo Moscow	Russia	18	0	0	0	6	—	—	—	—	—
2000–01	HC Dynamo Moscow-2	Russia3	7	5	3	8	4	—	—	—	—	—
2001–02	HC CSKA Moscow	Russia	22	6	4	10	4	—	—	—	—	—
2001–02	HC CSKA Moscow-2	Russia3	1	0	2	2	4	—	—	—	—	—
2002–03	Elemash Elektrostal	Russia2	16	2	10	12	6	—	—	—	—	—
2002–03	Elemash Elektrostal-2	Russia3	6	3	1	4	18	—	—	—	—	—
2003–04	Kristall Elektrostal	Russia2	44	6	10	16	16	—	—	—	—	—
2003–04	Metallurg Novokuznetsk	Russia	3	0	0	0	0	—	—	—	—	—
2004–05	Vityaz Chekhov	Russia2	44	6	11	17	26	6	0	1	1	2
2004–05	Vityaz Chekhov-2	MosJHL	2	0	1	1	0	—	—	—	—	—
2005–06	HK Brest	Belarus	31	11	11	22	30	—	—	—	—	—
2005–06	HK Gomel	Belarus	13	3	3	6	4	2	0	0	0	10
2006–07	HC Neman Grodno	Belarus	25	10	11	21	12	—	—	—	—	—
2006–07	HK Dmitrov	Russia2	22	6	14	20	20	14	2	2	4	6
2007–08	HK Dmitrov	Russia2	54	12	18	30	26	4	1	1	2	0
2008–09	HK Dmitrov	Russia2	55	14	22	36	30	6	0	1	1	0
2008–09	HK Dmitrov-2	Russia4	4	3	4	7	2	—	—	—	—	—
2009–10	HC Rys	Russia2	28	5	3	8	10	—	—	—	—	—
2009–10	Titan Klin	Russia2	21	2	4	6	6	11	1	2	3	0
2010–11	Khimik-SKA Novopolotsk	Belarus	42	8	8	16	8	—	—	—	—	—
2011–12	HC Ryazan	VHL	20	1	1	2	0	—	—	—	—	—
Russia totals			63	10	6	16	14	—	—	—	—	—
Russia2 totals			319	63	112	175	150	55	8	12	20	10
