= Björn Nord =

Swedish ice hockey player

- Born: April 5, 1972 (age 54) Huddinge, Sweden
- Height: 6 ft 0 in (183 cm)
- Weight: 194 lb (88 kg; 13 st 12 lb)
- Position: Defenceman
- Shot: Right
- Played for: Djurgårdens IF; Huddinge IK; Nürnberg Ice Tigers
- National team: Sweden
- NHL draft: 289th overall, 2000; Washington Capitals
- Playing career: 1992–2004

Björn Nord (born April 5, 1972) is a Swedish former professional ice hockey defenceman. Nord began playing hockey in Huddinge IK where he also played until the 1992–93 Elitserien season when he joined Djurgårdens IF. He stayed in Djurgården until his retirement in 2004 with the exception of the 2000–01 season when he played with German side Nürnberg Ice Tigers. Nord was forced to retire after suffering a serious injury in December 2003. He won a Swedish Championship with Djurgården in 1999–2000 Elitserien season. Nord was drafted in 9th round, 289th overall, by the Washington Capitals in the 2000 NHL entry draft.

== Career statistics ==
=== Regular season and playoffs ===
| | | | Regular season | | | | | Playoffs |
| Season | Team | League | GP | G | A | Pts | PIM | GP | G | A | Pts | PIM |
|---|---|---|---|---|---|---|---|---|---|---|---|---|
| 1990–91 | Huddinge IK | SWE.2 | 5 | 1 | 0 | 1 | 4 | 2 | 0 | 1 | 1 | 0 |
| 1991–92 | Huddinge IK | SWE.2 | 32 | 12 | 10 | 22 | 64 | 4 | 1 | 1 | 2 | 6 |
| 1992–93 | Djurgårdens IF | SEL | 35 | 2 | 2 | 4 | 42 | 6 | 0 | 2 | 2 | 10 |
| 1993–94 | Djurgårdens IF | SEL | 39 | 6 | 11 | 17 | 20 | 6 | 0 | 3 | 3 | 4 |
| 1994–95 | Djurgårdens IF | SEL | 39 | 7 | 7 | 14 | 42 | 3 | 0 | 0 | 0 | 2 |
| 1995–96 | Djurgårdens IF | SEL | 40 | 8 | 10 | 18 | 50 | 4 | 0 | 0 | 0 | 6 |
| 1996–97 | Djurgårdens IF | SEL | 50 | 11 | 14 | 25 | 52 | 4 | 1 | 1 | 2 | 4 |
| 1997–98 | Djurgårdens IF | SEL | 43 | 6 | 11 | 17 | 65 | 15 | 5 | 6 | 11 | 28 |
| 1998–99 | Djurgårdens IF | SEL | 50 | 12 | 20 | 32 | 50 | 4 | 0 | 2 | 2 | 2 |
| 1999–2000 | Djurgårdens IF | SEL | 49 | 17 | 11 | 28 | 62 | 13 | 4 | 2 | 6 | 8 |
| 2000–01 | Nürnberg Ice Tigers | DEL | 56 | 5 | 16 | 21 | 36 | 4 | 1 | 1 | 2 | 4 |
| 2001–02 | Djurgårdens IF | SEL | 50 | 8 | 12 | 20 | 46 | 5 | 0 | 0 | 0 | 6 |
| 2002–03 | Djurgårdens IF | SEL | 49 | 11 | 17 | 28 | 108 | 11 | 1 | 6 | 7 | 33 |
| 2003–04 | Djurgårdens IF | SEL | 20 | 3 | 7 | 10 | 24 | — | — | — | — | — |
| 2021–22 | Brinkens IF | SWE.6 | 1 | 0 | 0 | 0 | 0 | — | — | — | — | — |
| SEL totals | | | 464 | 91 | 122 | 213 | 561 | 71 | 11 | 22 | 31 | 103 |

=== International ===
| Year | Team | Event | GP | G | A | Pts | PIM |
|---|---|---|---|---|---|---|---|
| 1992 | Sweden | WJC | 7 | 1 | 6 | 7 | 6 |
| 2000 | Sweden | WC | 7 | 3 | 3 | 6 | 6 |
| 2001 | Sweden | WC | 9 | 0 | 2 | 2 | 4 |
| Junior totals | | | 16 | 3 | 5 | 8 | 10 |
