= Jeff Staples =

Canadian ice hockey player

- Born: March 4, 1975 (age 51) Kitimat, British Columbia, Canada
- Height: 6 ft 2 in (188 cm)
- Weight: 205 lb (93 kg; 14 st 9 lb)
- Position: Defence
- Shot: Left
- Played for: Hershey Bears; Philadelphia Phantoms; Milwaukee Admirals; Saint John Flames
- NHL draft: 244th overall, 1993; Philadelphia Flyers
- Playing career: 1995–2000

Jeff Staples (born March 4, 1975) is a Canadian former professional ice hockey player who played in the American Hockey League (AHL) and International Hockey League (IHL). He was drafted by the Philadelphia Flyers in the tenth round of the 1993 NHL entry draft. After completing his junior hockey career with the Brandon Wheat Kings, Staples played three seasons with the Flyers' top minor league affiliate, the first season with the Hershey Bears and two seasons with the Philadelphia Phantoms. After winning the Calder Cup with the Phantoms in 1998, Staples was traded to the expansion Nashville Predators along with Dominic Roussel for a 7th-round pick in the 1998 NHL entry draft. After one season playing in the IHL for the Milwaukee Admirals, Staples played one more AHL season with the Saint John Flames before retiring.

== Career statistics ==
			Regular season					Playoffs
Season	Team	League	GP	G	A	Pts	PIM	GP	G	A	Pts	PIM
1991–92	Brandon Wheat Kings	WHL	3	0	0	0	0	—	—	—	—	—
1992–93	Brandon Wheat Kings	WHL	40	0	5	5	114	4	0	1	1	4
1993–94	Brandon Wheat Kings	WHL	37	0	7	7	126	—	—	—	—	—
1994–95	Brandon Wheat Kings	WHL	57	3	16	19	176	18	0	2	2	23
1994–95	Brandon Wheat Kings	M-Cup	—	—	—	—	—	4	0	1	1	18
1995–96	Hershey Bears	AHL	61	7	3	10	100	5	0	1	1	0
1996–97	Philadelphia Phantoms	AHL	74	4	11	15	157	8	0	2	2	10
1997–98	Philadelphia Phantoms	AHL	63	4	16	20	187	19	0	0	0	23
1998–99	Milwaukee Admirals	IHL	69	2	10	12	155	2	0	0	0	2
1999–00	Saint John Flames	AHL	72	2	14	16	89	2	0	0	0	0
AHL totals			270	17	44	61	533	34	0	3	3	33
