= Ľubomír Pištek =

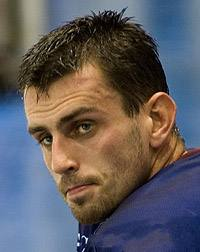
- Born: 7 August 1980 (age 45) Bratislava, Czechoslovakia
- Height: 6 ft 2 in (188 cm)
- Weight: 198 lb (90 kg; 14 st 2 lb)
- Position: Right wing
- Shot: Left
- Played for: HC Slovan Bratislava; HC Dynamo Pardubice; VHK Vsetín; HC Vítkovice Steel; HC Zlín; HC Oceláři Třinec; HK Nitra
- NHL draft: 222nd overall, 1998; Philadelphia Flyers
- Playing career: 2000–2009

Ľubomír Pištek (born 7 August 1980) is a former Slovak professional ice hockey player who played in the Slovak Extraliga and Czech Extraliga. He was selected by the Philadelphia Flyers in the 8th round (222nd overall) of the 1998 NHL entry draft. He played six seasons with HC Slovan Bratislava. Over the course of his career, Pištek won Slovak league championship twice with Slovan Bratislava (2001-02 and 2006-07). He also won the Czech league championship with HC Moeller Pardubice in the 2003-04 session.

Representing Slovakia U18, Pištek scored against Canada U18 in August 1997. Pištek participated at the 1998 IIHF European U18 Championship, 1999 World Junior Ice Hockey Championships and the 2000 World Junior Ice Hockey Championships.

After retiring from active hockey, Pištek followed the footsteps of Marián Gáborík and focused on developing ice hockey infrastructure for children. His first project was a training rink in the Lamač borough of Bratislava, opened in 2011. In 2016 he completed the second rink in Bruck an der Leitha.

== Career statistics ==
			Regular season					Playoffs
Season	Team	League	GP	G	A	Pts	PIM	GP	G	A	Pts	PIM
1998–99	Kelowna Rockets	WHL	55	13	16	29	38	6	0	0	0	6
1999–00	Kelowna Rockets	WHL	28	7	4	11	30	—	—	—	—	—
1999–00	Saskatoon Blades	WHL	28	4	11	15	20	11	1	1	2	4
2000–01	HC Slovan Bratislava	Slovak	49	6	7	13	34	—	—	—	—	—
2001–02	HC Slovan Bratislava	Slovak	50	15	7	22	72	—	—	—	—	—
2002–03	HC ČSOB Pojišťovna Pardubice	Czech	49	4	9	13	56	18	5	1	6	12
2003–04	HC Moeller Pardubice	Czech	47	4	10	14	111	6	1	2	3	14
2004–05	Vsetinska Hokejova	Czech	8	0	0	0	2	—	—	—	—	—
2004–05	HC Moeller Pardubice	Czech	27	5	3	8	8	5	1	0	1	6
2004–05	HC VCE Hradec Králové	Czech2	6	1	1	2	2	—	—	—	—	—
2005–06	HC Vitkovice Steel	Czech	3	0	0	0	0	—	—	—	—	—
2005–06	HC Hamé Zlín	Czech	8	0	0	0	8	—	—	—	—	—
2005–06	HC Ocelari Trinec	Czech	17	0	0	0	14	—	—	—	—	—
2005–06	HC Slovan Bratislava	Slovak	18	0	1	1	30	4	0	0	0	6
2006–07	HC Slovan Bratislava	Slovak	53	7	11	18	32	14	2	1	3	61
2007–08	HC Slovan Bratislava	Slovak	53	6	6	12	46	18	1	4	5	24
2008–09	HK Nitra	Slovak	22	4	7	11	34	—	—	—	—	—
2008–09	HC Slovan Bratislava	Slovak	8	1	1	2	8	12	1	1	2	6
Czech totals			159	13	22	35	199	29	7	3	10	32
Slovak totals			253	39	40	79	256	48	4	6	10	97
