= Chris Corrinet =

American ice hockey player (born 1978)

- Born: October 29, 1978 (age 46); Trumbull, Connecticut, U.S.
- Height: 6 ft 3 in (191 cm)
- Weight: 218 lb (99 kg; 15 st 8 lb)
- Position: Right wing
- Shot: Right
- Played for: Washington Capitals; HDD Olimpija Ljubljana
- NHL draft: 107th overall, 1998; Washington Capitals
- Playing career: 2001–2005

Christopher M. Corrinet (born October 29, 1978) is an American former ice hockey right winger. He played eight games in the National Hockey League with the Washington Capitals during the 2001–02 season. The rest of his career, which lasted from 2001 to 2005, was mainly spent in the minor leagues. Corrinet was born in Trumbull, Connecticut, and grew up in Greenfield, Massachusetts.

== Career statistics ==
=== Regular season and playoffs ===
			Regular season					Playoffs
Season	Team	League	GP	G	A	Pts	PIM	GP	G	A	Pts	PIM
1996–97	Deerfield Academy	HS-MA	16	6	15	21	10	—	—	—	—	—
1997–98	Princeton University	ECAC	31	3	6	9	22	—	—	—	—	—
1998–99	Princeton University	ECAC	32	10	6	16	38	—	—	—	—	—
1999–00	Princeton University	ECAC	30	10	14	24	41	—	—	—	—	—
2000–01	Princeton University	ECAC	31	13	12	25	30	—	—	—	—	—
2000–01	Portland Pirates	AHL	6	0	1	1	4	2	1	0	1	0
2001–02	Washington Capitals	NHL	8	0	1	1	6	—	—	—	—	—
2001–02	Portland Pirates	AHL	51	15	18	33	64	—	—	—	—	—
2002–03	Portland Pirates	AHL	33	0	3	3	23	—	—	—	—	—
2002–03	Philadelphia Phantoms	AHL	1	0	0	0	0	—	—	—	—	—
2002–03	Worcester IceCats	AHL	28	6	12	18	27	3	0	2	2	2
2003–04	Worcester IceCats	AHL	11	0	1	1	36	—	—	—	—	—
2003–04	HDD Olimpija Ljubljana	SLO	7	6	3	9	22	4	0	2	2	6
2004–05	Victoria Salmon Kings	ECHL	37	9	11	20	66	—	—	—	—	—
AHL totals			130	21	35	56	154	5	1	2	3	2
NHL totals			8	0	1	1	6	—	—	—	—	—
