= Radek Matějovský =

Czech ice hockey player

- Born: November 17, 1977 (age 48) Prague, Czechoslovakia
- Height: 6 ft 1 in (185 cm)
- Weight: 196 lb (89 kg; 14 st 0 lb)
- Position: Forward
- Shoots: Right
- Czech Extraliga team: BK Mladá Boleslav
- NHL draft: 250th overall, 1998; New York Islanders
- Playing career: 1996–present

Radek Matějovský (born November 17, 1977) is a Czech professional ice hockey player. He was selected by the New York Islanders in the 9th round (250th overall) of the 1998 NHL entry draft.

Matejovsky played with HC Slavia Praha and HC Berounští Medvědi in the 1996–97 Czech Extraliga season, HC Slavia Praha in the 1997–98 Czech Extraliga season, HC Dukla Jihlava in the 1998–99 Czech Extraliga season, HC Slavia Praha and HC IPB Pojišťovna Pardubice in the 1999–2000 Czech Extraliga season, HC Slavia Praha in the 2000–01 Czech Extraliga season, HC Slavia Praha in the 2001–02 Czech Extraliga season, HC Keramika Plzeň in the 2002–03 Czech Extraliga season, HC Lasselsberger Plzeň in the 2003–04 Czech Extraliga season, HC Lasselsberger Plzeň in the 2004–05 Czech Extraliga season, HC Lasselsberger Plzeň in the 2005–06 Czech Extraliga season, HC Lasselsberger Plzeň in the 2006–07 Czech Extraliga season, HC Lasselsberger Plzeň in the 2007–08 Czech Extraliga season, HC Lasselsberger Plzeň in the 2008–09 Czech Extraliga season, HC Plzeň and HC Bílí Tygři Liberec in the 2009–10 Czech Extraliga season, BK Mladá Boleslav in the Czech Extraliga during the 2010–11 Czech Extraliga season.
