= Dmitri Nabokov (ice hockey) =

Russian ice hockey player (1977–2019)

- Born: 4 January 1977 Novosibirsk, Russian SFSR, Soviet Union
- Died: 14 April 2019 (aged 42) Novosibirsk, Russia
- Height: 6 ft 2 in (188 cm)
- Weight: 216 lb (98 kg; 15 st 6 lb)
- Position: Centre
- Shot: Right
- Played for: Krylya Sovetov Moscow; Chicago Blackhawks; New York Islanders; HC Lada Togliatti; Metallurg Novokuznetsk; HC Sibir Novosibirsk; HC Neftekhimik Nizhnekamsk; Molot-Prikamye Perm; HC MVD; HC Dynamo Moscow; Traktor Chelyabinsk; SaiPa
- NHL draft: 19th overall, 1995; Chicago Blackhawks
- Playing career: 1993–2011

Dmitri Viktorovich Nabokov (Russian: Дмитрий Викторович Набоков; 4 January 1977 — 14 April 2019) was a Russian professional ice hockey forward.

== Draft ==
Nabokov was drafted in the first round, nineteenth overall, of the 1995 NHL entry draft by the Chicago Blackhawks. On May 30, 1999, he was traded to the New York Islanders for Jean-Pierre Dumont. The Islanders also sent a fifth round pick to Chicago in the deal.

== Career ==
Nabokov played 55 National Hockey League games for the Blackhawks and New York Islanders. After 26 games and four goals with the Islanders, he did not appear in the NHL again.

== Death ==
Nabokov died in April 2019 of what media reports said was "a severe illness."

== Career statistics ==
=== Regular season and playoffs ===
			Regular season					Playoffs
Season	Team	League	GP	G	A	Pts	PIM	GP	G	A	Pts	PIM
1993–94	Krylya Sovetov Moscow	RUS	17	0	2	2	6	3	0	0	0	0
1993–94	Krylya Sovetov–2 Moscow	RUS.2	28	8	3	11	20	—	—	—	—	—
1994–95	Krylya Sovetov Moscow	RUS	49	15	12	27	32	4	5	0	5	6
1995–96	Krylya Sovetov Moscow	RUS	50	12	14	26	51	—	—	—	—	—
1995–96	Krylya Sovetov–2 Moscow	RUS.2	1	0	1	1	0	—	—	—	—	—
1996–97	Krylya Sovetov Moscow	RSL	1	0	0	0	0	—	—	—	—	—
1996–97	Regina Pats	WHL	50	39	56	95	61	5	2	3	5	2
1996–97	Indianapolis Ice	IHL	2	0	0	0	0	—	—	—	—	—
1997–98	Chicago Blackhawks	NHL	25	7	4	11	10	—	—	—	—	—
1997–98	Indianapolis Ice	IHL	46	6	15	21	16	5	2	1	3	0
1998–99	Lowell Lock Monsters	AHL	73	17	25	42	46	3	0	1	1	0
1998-99	New York Islanders	NHL	4	0	2	2	2	—	—	—	—	—
1999–2000	New York Islanders	NHL	26	4	7	11	16	—	—	—	—	—
1999–2000	Lowell Lock Monsters	AHL	51	8	26	34	42	6	1	2	3	2
2000–01	Lada Togliatti	RSL	24	8	5	13	42	5	0	0	0	10
2001–02	Metallurg Novokuznetsk	RSL	30	9	11	20	14	—	—	—	—	—
2002–03	Metallurg Novokuznetsk	RSL	17	4	9	13	14	—	—	—	—	—
2002–03	Sibir Novosibirsk	RSL	30	5	9	14	22	—	—	—	—	—
2003–04	Neftekhimik Nizhnekamsk	RSL	51	5	12	17	75	5	1	0	1	2
2004–05	Molot–Prikamye Perm	RSL	32	3	4	7	20	—	—	—	—	—
2004–05	Molot–Prikamye–2 Perm	RUS.3	4	2	5	7	4	—	—	—	—	—
2005–06	HC MVD	RSL	23	4	4	8	18	—	—	—	—	—
2005–06	Dynamo Moscow	RSL	16	1	2	3	8	4	0	0	0	4
2006–07	Sibir Novosibirsk	RSL	45	7	6	13	26	7	0	0	0	6
2007–08	Sibir Novosibirsk	RSL	8	0	1	1	2	—	—	—	—	—
2007–08	Traktor Chelyabinsk	RSL	6	1	1	2	0	—	—	—	—	—
2008–09	SaiPa	SM-l	58	7	25	32	42	—	—	—	—	—
2009–10	Dornbirner EC	AUT.2	35	24	54	78	68	7	4	6	10	6
2010–11	Dornbirner EC	AUT.2	11	5	14	19	4	8	1	2	3	8
RUS totals			116	27	28	55	89	7	5	0	5	6
RSL totals			283	47	65	112	243	21	1	0	1	22
NHL totals			55	11	13	24	28	—	—	—	—	—

=== International ===
Year	Team	Event	Result	GP	G	A	Pts	PIM
1995	Russia	EJC	4th	5	1	4	5	4
1996	Russia	WJC	3rd place, bronze medalist(s)	7	3	5	8	4
Junior totals				12	4	9	13	8

== Awards and honours ==
Award	Year
WHL
East Second All-Star Team	1997

Preceded by Ethan Moreau	Chicago Blackhawks first-round draft pick 1995	Succeeded by Daniel Cleary
