= List of Nashville Predators draft picks =

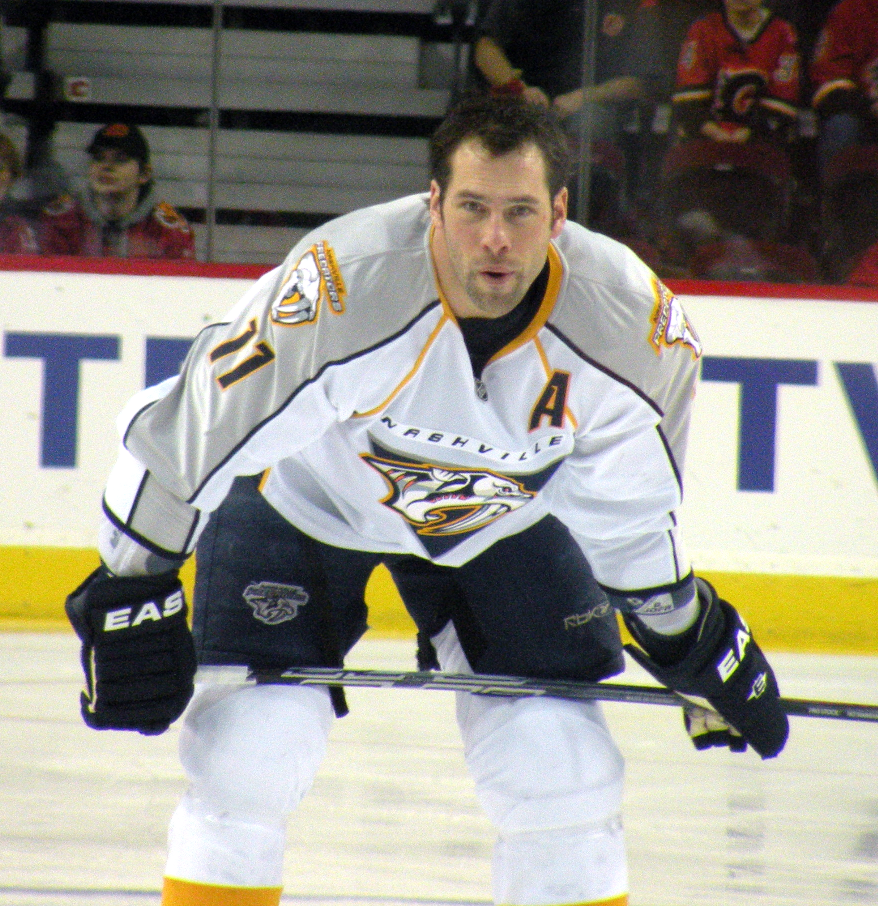
David Legwand was the first player ever selected by the Predators.

This is a complete list of Nashville Predators draft picks, ice hockey players who were drafted in the National Hockey League Entry Draft by the Nashville Predators franchise. It includes every player who was drafted, regardless of whether they played for the team. David Legwand became the Predators' first amateur draft pick during the 1998 NHL entry draft. Selected second overall, he appeared in one game for the Predators during the 1998–99 season, and joined the team full-time the next season. As the longest serving Predator, Legwand holds team records for games played, goals, assists, and points. The Predators selected Brian Finley sixth overall in 1999. Finley appeared in two games for the Predators during his career, allowing 10 goals in 107 minutes. Alexander Radulov was the first European selected by the Predators in the first round when he was taken 15th overall in 2004.

== Key ==
Played in at least one NHL game with the Predators
Played in at least one NHL All-Star Game

Statistics
Pos	Position	GP	Games played
G	Goals	A	Assists
Pts	Points	PIM	Penalties in minutes
GAA	Goals against average	W	Wins
L	Losses	SV%	Save percentage
OT	Overtime or Shootout losses	–	Does not apply

Positions
G	Goaltender
D	Defenseman
LW	Left wing
C	Center
RW	Right wing
F	Forward

== Draft picks ==
Statistics are complete as of the 2025–26 NHL season and show each player's career regular season totals in the NHL. Wins, losses, ties, overtime losses and goals against average apply to goaltenders and are used only for players at that position. A player listed with a dash under the games played column has not played in the NHL.

Year	Round	Pick	Player	Nationality	Pos	GP	G	A	Pts	PIM	W	L	OT	SV%	GAA
1998	1	2	David Legwand	United States	C	1136	228	390	618	551					
1998	3	60	Denis Arkhipov	Russia	C	352	56	82	138	128					
1998	3	85	Geoff Koch	United States	LW										
1998	4	88	Kent Sauer	United States	D										
1998	5	138	Martin Beauchesne	Canada	D										
1998	6	147	Craig Brunel	Canada	RW										
1998	8	202	Martin Bartek	Slovakia	LW										
1998	9	230	Karlis Skrastins	Latvia	D	832	32	104	136	375					
1999	1	6	Brian Finley	Canada	G	4	0	0	0	0	0	2	0	.851	4.70
1999	2	33	Jonas Andersson	Sweden	LW	9	0	0	0	2					
1999	2	52	Adam Hall	United States	RW	682	69	87	156	282					
1999	2	54	Andrew Hutchinson	United States	D	140	12	27	39	70					
1999	2	61	Ed Hill	United States	D										
1999	2	65	Jan Lasak	Slovakia	G	6	0	0	0	2	0	4	0	.874	4.04
1999	3	72	Brett Angel	Canada	D										
1999	4	121	Evgeny Pavlov	Russia	C										
1999	4	124	Alexander Krevsun	Kazakhstan	LW										
1999	5	131	Konstantin Panov	Russia	LW										
1999	6	162	Timo Helbling	Switzerland	D	11	0	1	1	8					
1999	7	191	Martin Erat	Czech Republic	RW	881	176	369	545	506					
1999	7	205	Kyle Kettles	Canada	G										
1999	8	220	Miroslav Durak	Slovakia	D										
1999	9	248	Darren Haydar	Canada	RW	23	1	7	8	2					
2000	1	6	Scott Hartnell	Canada	RW	1249	327	380	707	1809					
2000	2	36	Daniel Widing	Sweden	RW										
2000	3	72	Mattias Nilsson	Sweden	D										
2000	3	89	Libor Pivko	Czech Republic	LW	1	0	0	0	0					
2000	5	131	Matt Hendricks	United States	C	607	54	62	116	722					
2000	5	137	Mike Stuart	United States	D	3	0	0	0	0					
2000	5	154	Matt Koalska	United States	C	3	0	0	0	2					
2000	6	173	Tomas Harant	Slovakia	D										
2000	6	197	Zbynek Irgl	Czech Republic	RW										
2000	7	203	Jure Penko	Slovenia	G										
2000	8	236	Mats Christeen	Sweden	D										
2000	9	284	Martin Hohener	Switzerland	D										
2001	1	12	Dan Hamhuis	Canada	D	1148	59	297	356	684					
2001	2	33	Timofei Shishkanov	Russia	LW	24	3	2	5	6					
2001	2	42	Tomas Slovak	Slovakia	D										
2001	3	75	Denis Platonov	Russia	C										
2001	3	76	Oliver Setzinger	Austria	F										
2001	4	98	Jordin Tootoo	Canada	RW	723	65	96	161	1010					
2001	6	178	Anton Lavrentiev	Russia	D										
2001	8	240	Gustav Grasberg	Sweden	LW										
2001	9	271	Mikko Lehtonen	Finland	D	15	1	2	3	8					
2002	1	6	Scottie Upshall	Canada	RW	759	138	146	285	615					
2002	4	102	Brandon Segal	Canada	RW	103	11	11	22	85					
2002	5	138	Patrick Jarrett	Canada	C										
2002	6	172	Mike McKenna	United States	G	35	0	1	1	0	7	17	3	.890	3.60
2002	7	203	Josh Morrow	Canada	D										
2002	8	235	Kaleb Betts	Canada	LW										
2002	9	264	Matthew Davis	Canada	G										
2002	9	266	Steven Spencer	Canada	D										
2003	1	7	Ryan Suter	United States	D	1526	107	589	696	785					
2003	2	35	Konstantin Glazachev	Russia	LW										
2003	2	37	Kevin Klein	Canada	D	627	38	116	154	185					
2003	2	49	Shea Weber	Canada	D	1038	224	365	589	714					
2003	3	76	Richard Stehlik	Slovakia	D										
2003	3	89	Paul Brown	Canada	LW										
2003	3	92	Alexander Sulzer	Germany	D	131	7	15	22	44					
2003	3	99	Grigory Shafigulin	Russia	C										
2003	4	117	Teemu Lassila	Finland	G										
2003	4	133	Rustam Sidikov	Russia	G										
2003	7	210	Andrei Mukhachev	Russia	D										
2003	7	213	Miroslav Hanuljak	Czech Republic	G										
2003	9	268	Lauris Darzins	Latvia	LW										
2004	1	15	Alexander Radulov	Russia	F	524	144	224	368	344					
2004	3	81	Vaclav Meidl	Czech Republic	C										
2004	4	107	Nick Fugere	Canada	LW										
2004	5	139	Kyle Moir	Canada	G										
2004	5	147	Janne Niskala	Finland	D	6	1	2	3	6					
2004	6	178	Mike Santorelli	Canada	C	406	64	74	138	78					
2004	6	193	Kevin Schaeffer	United States	D										
2004	7	209	Stanislav Balan	Czech Republic	F										
2004	8	243	Denis Kulyash	Russia	D										
2004	8	258	Pekka Rinne	Finland	G	683	1	14	15	56	369	213	75	.917	2.43
2004	9	275	Craig Switzer	Canada	D										
2005	1	18	Ryan Parent	Canada	D	106	1	6	7	36					
2005	3	78	Teemu Laakso	Finland	D	17	0	0	0	10					
2005	3	79	Cody Franson	Canada	D	550	43	169	212	202					
2005	5	150	Cal O'Reilly	Canada	C	145	16	33	49	14					
2005	6	176	Ryan Maki	United States	RW										
2005	7	213	Scott Todd	Canada	D										
2005	7	230	Patric Hornqvist	Sweden	RW	901	264	279	543	466					
2006	2	56	Blake Geoffrion	United States	C	55	8	5	13	34					
2006	4	105	Niko Snellman	Finland	RW										
2006	5	146	Mark Dekanich	Canada	G	1	0	0	0	0	0	0	0	.880	3.60
2006	6	176	Ryan Flynn	United States	RW										
2006	7	206	Viktor Sjodin	Sweden	LW										
2007	1	23	Jonathon Blum	United States	D	110	7	17	24	22					
2007	2	54	Jeremy Smith	United States	G	10	0	0	0	0	1	6	1	.888	3.52
2007	2	58	Nick Spaling	Canada	D	437	52	72	124	120					
2007	3	81	Ryan Thang	United States	LW	1	0	0	0	0					
2007	4	114	Ben Ryan	United States	C										
2007	4	119	Mark Santorelli	Canada	LW										
2007	5	144	Andreas Thuresson	Sweden	F	25	1	2	3	6					
2007	6	174	Robert Dietrich	Germany	D										
2007	7	204	Atte Engren	Finland	G										
2008	1	7	Colin Wilson	United States	F	632	113	173	286	138					
2008	1	18	Chet Pickard	Canada	G										
2008	2	38	Roman Josi	Switzerland	D	1030	203	576	779	429					
2008	5	136	Taylor Stefishen	Canada	LW										
2008	6	166	Jeff Foss	United States	LW										
2008	7	201	Jani Lajunen	Finland	F										
2008	7	207	Anders Lindback	Sweden	G	130	0	4	4	6	45	58	8	.904	2.87
2009	1	11	Ryan Ellis	Canada	D	566	76	199	275	189					
2009	2	41	Zach Budish	United States	RW										
2009	2	42	Charles-Olivier Roussel	Canada	D										
2009	3	70	Taylor Beck	Canada	RW	92	11	12	23	32					
2009	3	72	Michael Latta	Canada	C	113	4	13	17	130					
2009	4	98	Craig Smith	United States	C	987	220	232	452	395					
2009	4	102	Mattias Ekholm	Sweden	D	966	92	309	401	458					
2009	4	110	Nick Oliver	United States	C										
2009	5	132	Gabriel Bourque	Canada	LW	413	40	63	103	75					
2009	7	192	Cameron Reid	Canada	G										
2010	1	18	Austin Watson	United States	RW	528	63	58	121	722					
2010	3	78	Taylor Aronson	United States	D										
2010	5	126	Patrick Cehlin	Sweden	RW										
2010	6	168	Anthony Bitetto	United States	D	197	3	28	31	142					
2010	7	194	David Elsner	Germany	F										
2010	7	198	Joonas Rask	Finland	F	2	0	1	1	0					
2011	2	38	Magnus Hellberg	Sweden	G	26	0	0	0	0	8	8	1	.890	3.08
2011	2	52	Miikka Salomaki	Finland	LW	167	12	15	27	76					
2011	4	94	Josh Shalla	Canada	LW										
2011	4	112	Garrett Noonan	United States	D										
2011	5	142	Simon Karlsson	Sweden	D										
2011	6	170	Chase Balisy	United States	F	8	0	0	0	0					
2011	7	202	Brent Andrews	Canada	LW										
2012	2	37	Pontus Aberg	Sweden	LW	132	17	27	44	34					
2012	2	50	Colton Sissons	Canada	C	756	101	131	232	269					
2012	3	66	Jimmy Vesey	United States	LW	626	101	93	194	144					
2012	3	89	Brendan Leipsic	Canada	LW	187	16	43	59	53					
2012	4	112	Zachary Stepan	United States	C										
2012	4	118	Mikko Vainonen	Finland	D										
2012	6	164	Simon Fernholm	Sweden	D										
2012	6	172	Max Gortz	Sweden	RW										
2012	6	179	Marek Mazanec	Czech Republic	G	31	0	1	1	0	8	13	4	.895	2.98
2013	1	4	Seth Jones	United States	D	912	106	367	473	326					
2013	3	64	Jonathan-Ismael Diaby	Canada	D										
2013	4	95	Felix Girard	Canada	C										
2013	4	99	Juuse Saros	Finland	G	467	0	8	8	10	230	172	46	.912	2.74
2013	5	125	Saku Maenalanen	Finland	RW	98	8	10	18	36					
2013	5	140	Teemu Kivihalme	United States	D										
2013	6	155	Emil Pettersson	Sweden	C										
2013	6	171	Tommy Veilleux	Canada	LW										
2013	7	185	Wade Murphy	Canada	RW										
2013	7	203	Janne Juvonen	Finland	G										
2014	1	11	Kevin Fiala	Switzerland	LW	707	229	299	528	403					
2014	2	42	Vladislav Kamenev	Russia	LW	66	3	10	13	20					
2014	2	51	Jack Dougherty	United States	D										
2014	3	62	Justin Kirkland	Canada	LW	50	3	7	10	13					
2014	4	112	Viktor Arvidsson	Sweden	LW	682	219	224	443	280					
2014	5	132	Joonas Lyytinen	Finland	D										
2014	6	162	Aaron Irving	Canada	D										
2015	2	55	Yakov Trenin	Russia	C	457	61	59	120	256					
2015	3	85	Tommy Novak	United States	C	285	65	94	159	46					
2015	4	100	Anthony Richard	Canada	C	40	6	8	14	8					
2015	4	115	Alexandre Carrier	Canada	D	369	20	89	109	205					
2015	5	145	Karel Vejmelka	Czech Republic	G	262	0	5	5	6	108	117	22	.899	3.10
2015	6	175	Tyler Moy	United States	C										
2015	7	205	Evan Smith	United States	G										
2016	1	17	Dante Fabbro	Canada	D	451	30	79	109	232					
2016	2	47	Samuel Girard	Canada	D	608	37	205	242	130					
2016	3	76	Rem Pitlick	Canada	C	132	21	33	54	54					
2016	3	78	Frederic Allard	Canada	D	4	0	0	0	0					
2016	4	108	Hardy Haman-Aktell	Sweden	D	6	0	1	1	2					
2016	5	138	Patrick Harper	United States	C										
2016	6	168	Konstantin Volkov	Russia	G										
2016	7	198	Adam Smith	Canada	D										
2017	1	30	Eeli Tolvanen	Finland	RW	423	92	98	190	111					
2017	2	61	Grant Mismash	United States	LW										
2017	3	92	David Farrance	United States	D	2	0	0	0	0					
2017	5	154	Tomas Vomacka	Czech Republic	G										
2017	6	176	Pavel Koltygin	Russia	C										
2017	7	216	Jacob Paquette	Canada	D										
2018	4	111	Jachym Kondelik	Czech Republic	C										
2018	5	131	Spencer Stastney	United States	D	117	4	15	19	30					
2018	5	151	Vladislav Yeryomenko	Belarus	D										
2018	7	213	Milan Kloucek	Czech Republic	G										
2019	1	24	Philip Tomasino	Canada	C	218	34	61	95	49					
2019	2	45	Egor Afanasyev	Russia	LW	19	1	0	1	2					
2019	3	65	Alexander Campbell	Canada	LW										
2019	4	109	Marc Del Gaizo	United States	D	55	2	10	12	23					
2019	4	117	Semyon Chystyakov	Russia	D										
2019	5	148	Ethan Haider	United States	G										
2019	6	179	Isak Walther	Sweden	RW										
2019	7	210	Juuso Parssinen	Finland	C	157	22	34	56	56					
2020	1	11	Yaroslav Askarov	Russia	G	63	0	1	1	2	26	27	6	.887	3.48
2020	2	42	Luke Evangelista	Canada	RW	253	45	97	142	74					
2020	3	73	Luke Prokop	Canada	D										
2020	4	101	Adam Wilsby	Sweden	D	81	2	19	21	35					
2020	6	166	Luke Reid	Canada	D										
2020	7	202	Gunnarwolfe Fontaine	United States	LW										
2020	7	209	Chase McLane	United States	C										
2021	1	19	Fedor Svechkov	Russia	C	122	12	22	34	36					
2021	1	27	Zachary L'Heureux	Canada	LW	87	9	11	20	84					
2021	3	72	Anton Olsson	Sweden	D										
2021	4	115	Ryan Ufko	United States	D	19	2	9	11	6					
2021	4	124	Jack Matier	Canada	D										
2021	6	179	Simon Knak	Switzerland	RW										
2022	1	17	Joakim Kemell	Finland	RW	18	1	2	3	0					
2022	3	82	Adam Ingram	Canada	C										
2022	3	84	Kasper Kulonummi	Finland	D										
2022	4	114	Cole O'Hara	Canada	RW	1	0	1	1	0					
2022	5	146	Graham Sward	Canada	D										
2022	7	210	Ben Striden	United States	C										
2023	1	15	Matthew Wood	Canada	LW	77	17	14	31	16					
2023	1	24	Tanner Molendyk	Canada	D										
2023	2	43	Felix Nilsson	Sweden	C										
2023	2	46	Kalan Lind	Canada	LW										
2023	3	68	Jesse Kiiskinen	Finland	RW										
2023	3	83	Dylan MacKinnon	Canada	D										
2023	4	111	Joey Willis	United States	C										
2023	4	121	Juha Jatkola	Finland	G										
2023	5	143	Sutter Muzzatti	United States	C										
2023	6	175	Austin Roest	Canada	C										
2023	7	218	Aiden Fink	Canada	RW										
2024	1	22	Yegor Surin	Russia	C										
2024	2	55	Teddy Stiga	United States	C										
2024	3	77	Viggo Gustafsson	Sweden	D										
2024	3	87	Miguel Marques	Canada	RW										
2024	3	94	Hiroki Gojsic	Canada	RW										
2024	4	99	Jakub Milota	Czechia	G										
2024	4	127	Viktor Norringer	Sweden	LW										
2024	7	213	Erik Pahlsson	Sweden	C										
2025	1	5	Brady Martin	Canada	C	3	0	1	1	0					
2025	1	21	Cameron Reid	Canada	D										
2025	1	26	Ryker Lee	United States	RW										
2025	2	35	Jacob Rombach	United States	D										
2025	2	58	Jack Ivankovic	Canada	G										
2025	4	122	Alex Huang	Canada	D										
2025	6	163	Daniel Nieminen	Finland	D										
2026	1	10	Wyatt Cullen	United States	LW										
2026	1	31	Tommy Bleyl	United States	D										
2026	3	70	Dmitri Borichev	Russia	G										
2026	4	106	Jakub Floris	Slovakia	D										
2026	4	118	Justin Graf	United States	LW										
2026	5	138	Philip Hemmyr	Sweden	LW										
2026	6	179	Benjamin Cossette-Ayotte	Canada	D										
2026	7	202	Charlie Puglisi	United States	C										

Some draft picks who have played for the team

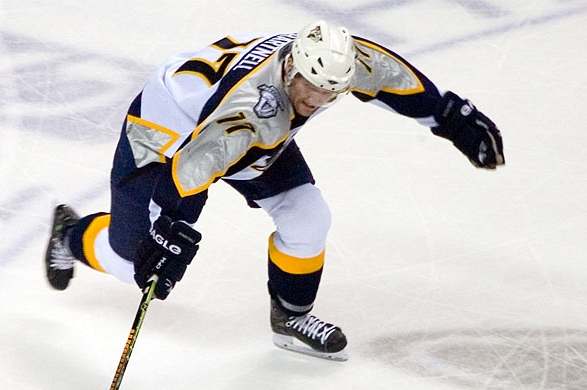
Scott Hartnell was the Predators' first-round selection in 2000.

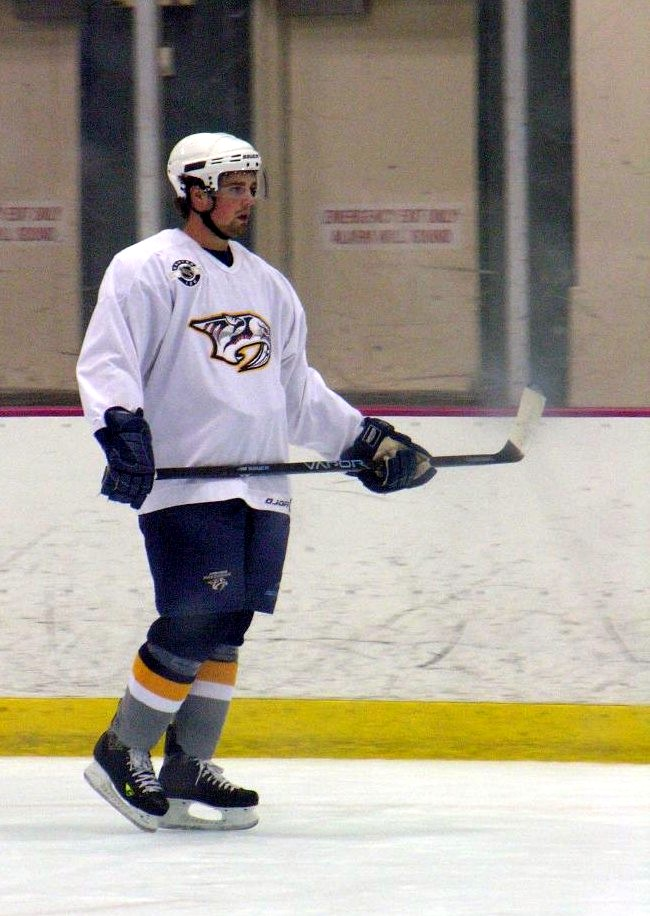
Dan Hamhuis was selected 12th overall in 2001.

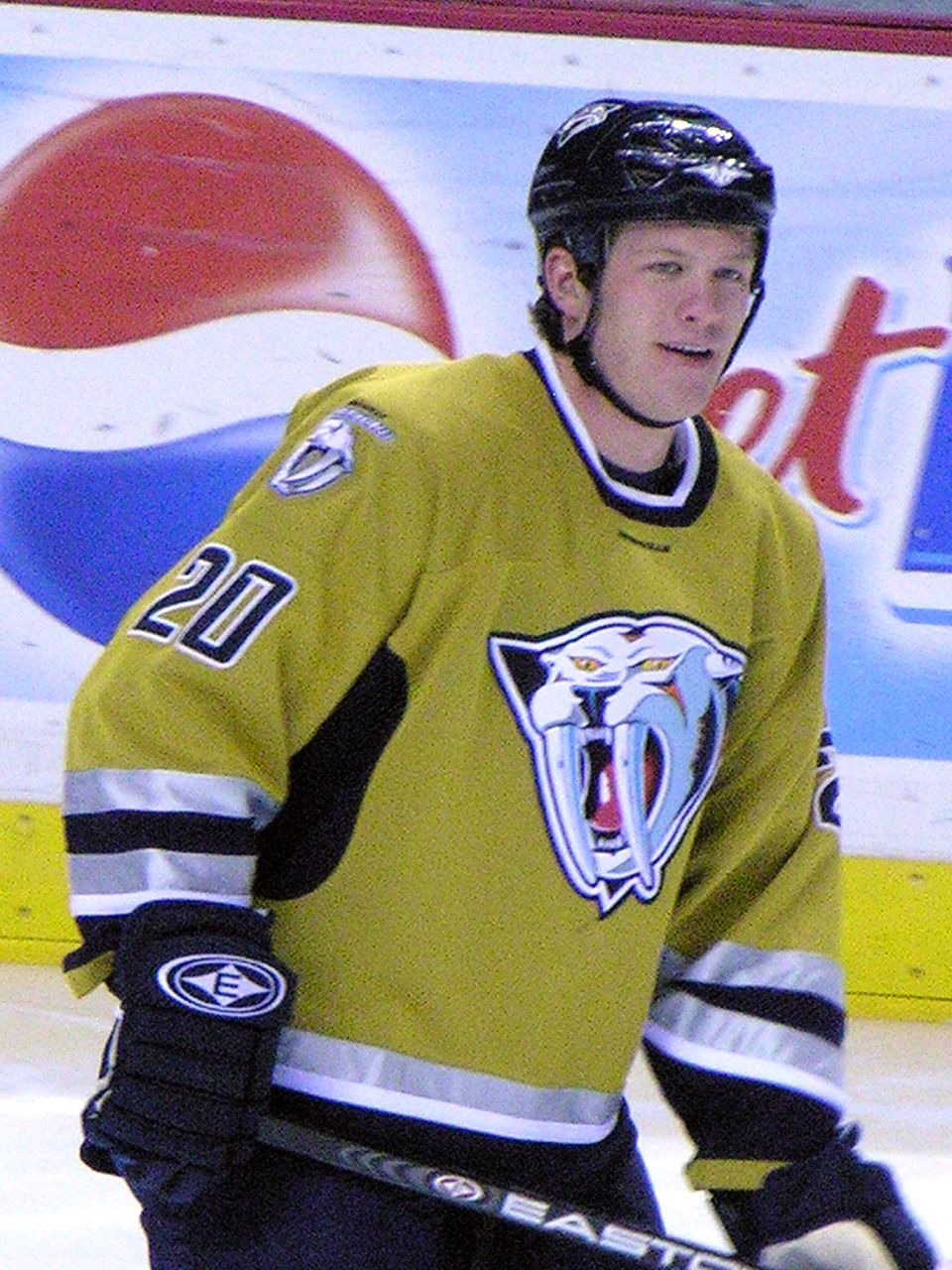
Ryan Suter was the team's first pick in 2003.

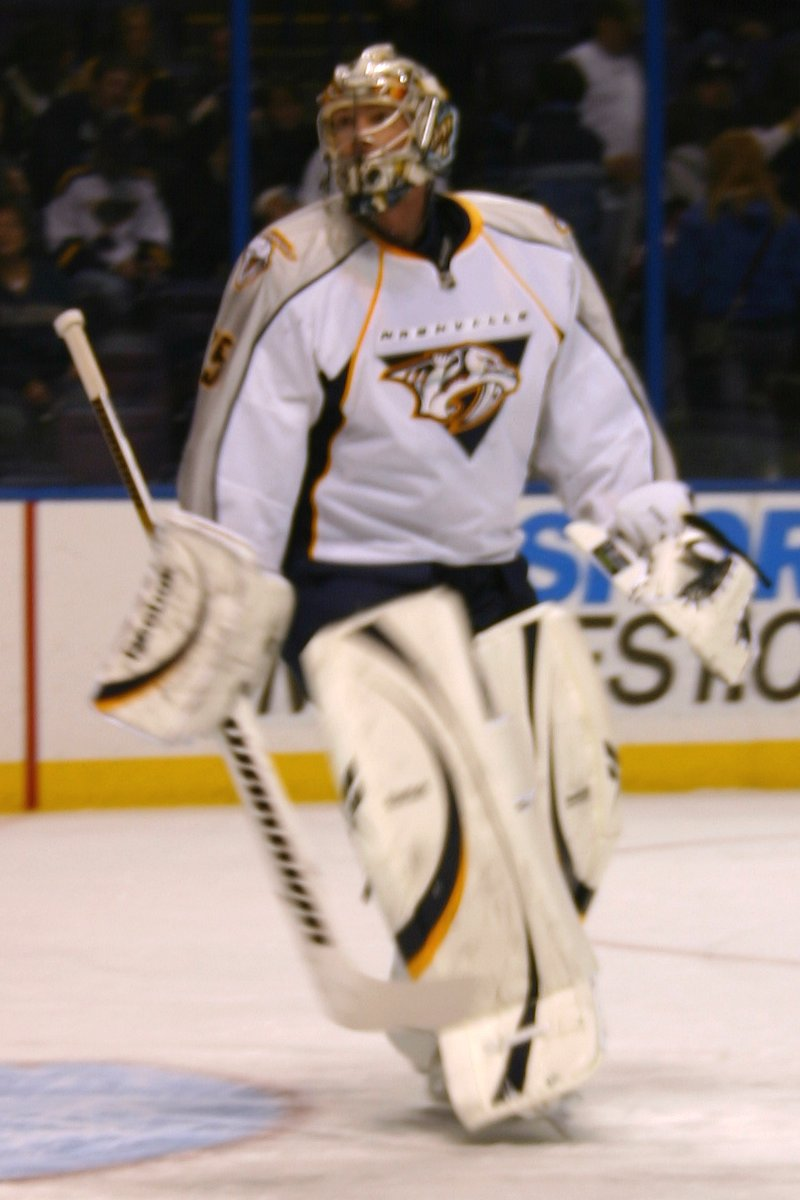
Pekka Rinne was drafted 258th overall in 2004.

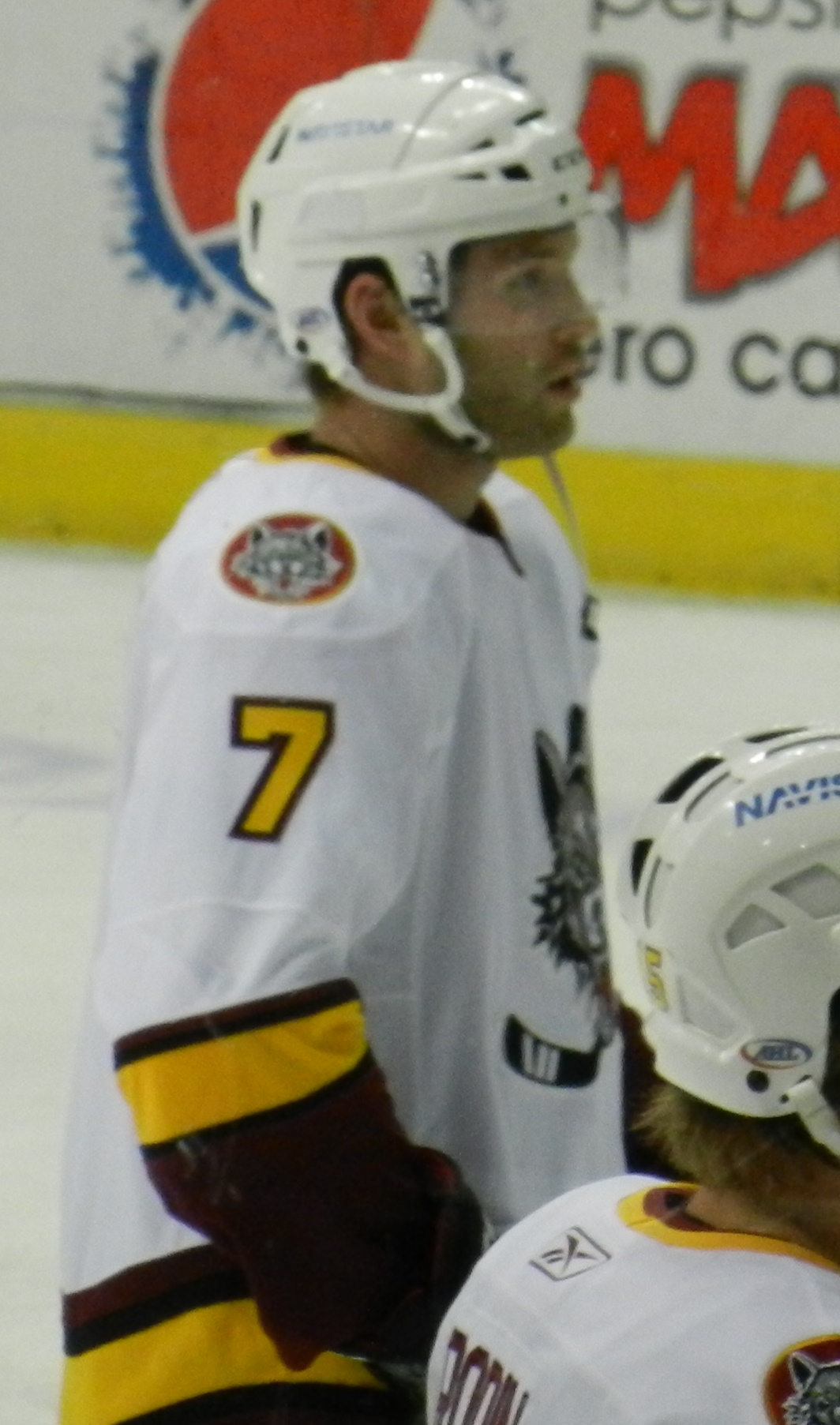
Ryan Parent, shown here with the Chicago Wolves, was the Predators first round pick in 2005.

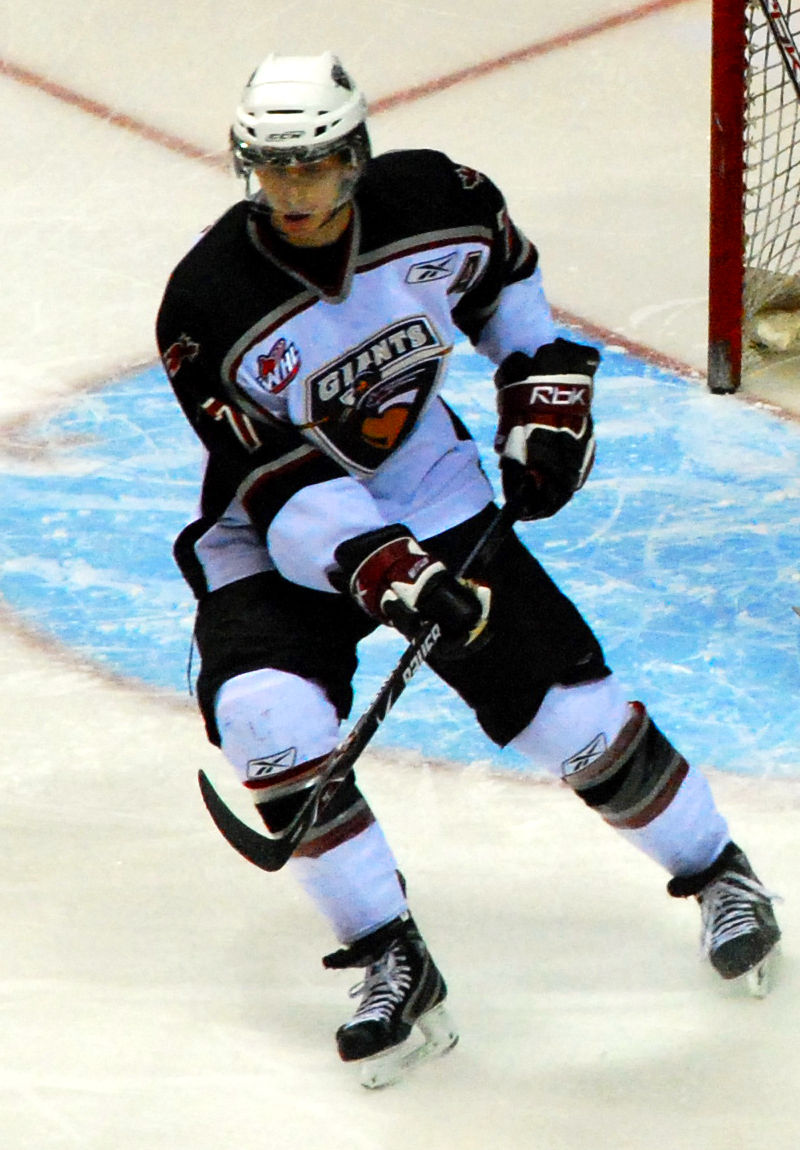
Jonathon Blum, shown here with the Vancouver Giants, was the first round pick in 2007.

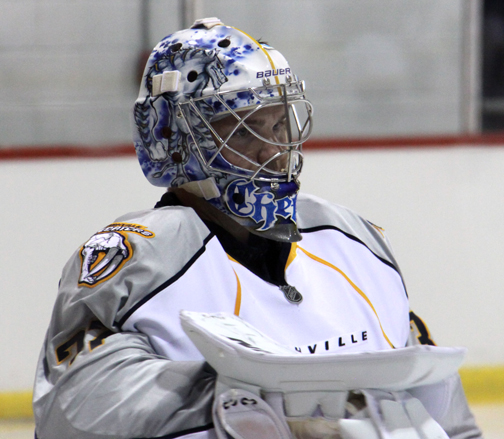
In 2008 Chet Pickard was the Predators first round pick.

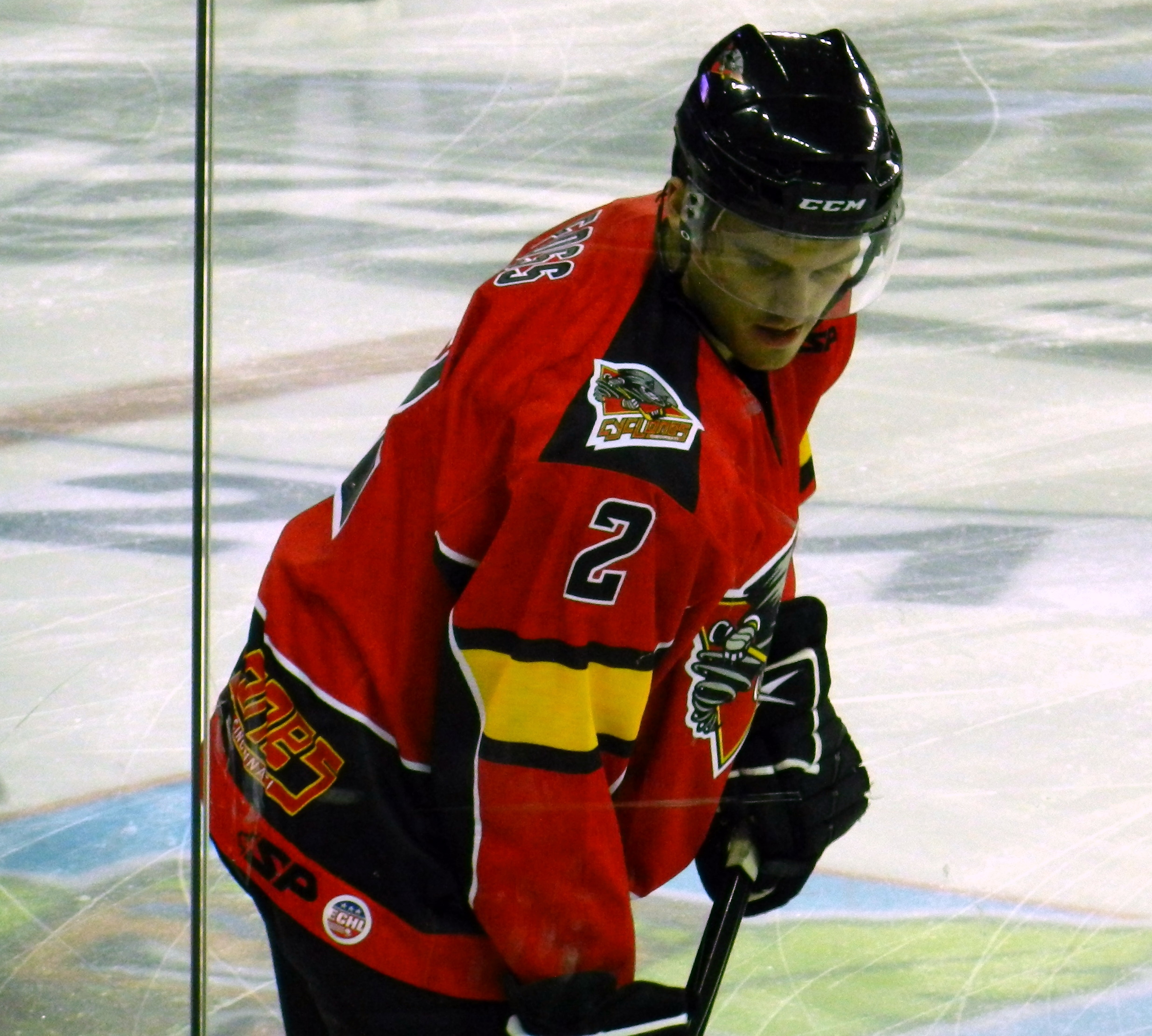
Jeff Foss, shown here with the Cincinnati Cyclones, was drafted in the 6th round in 2008.

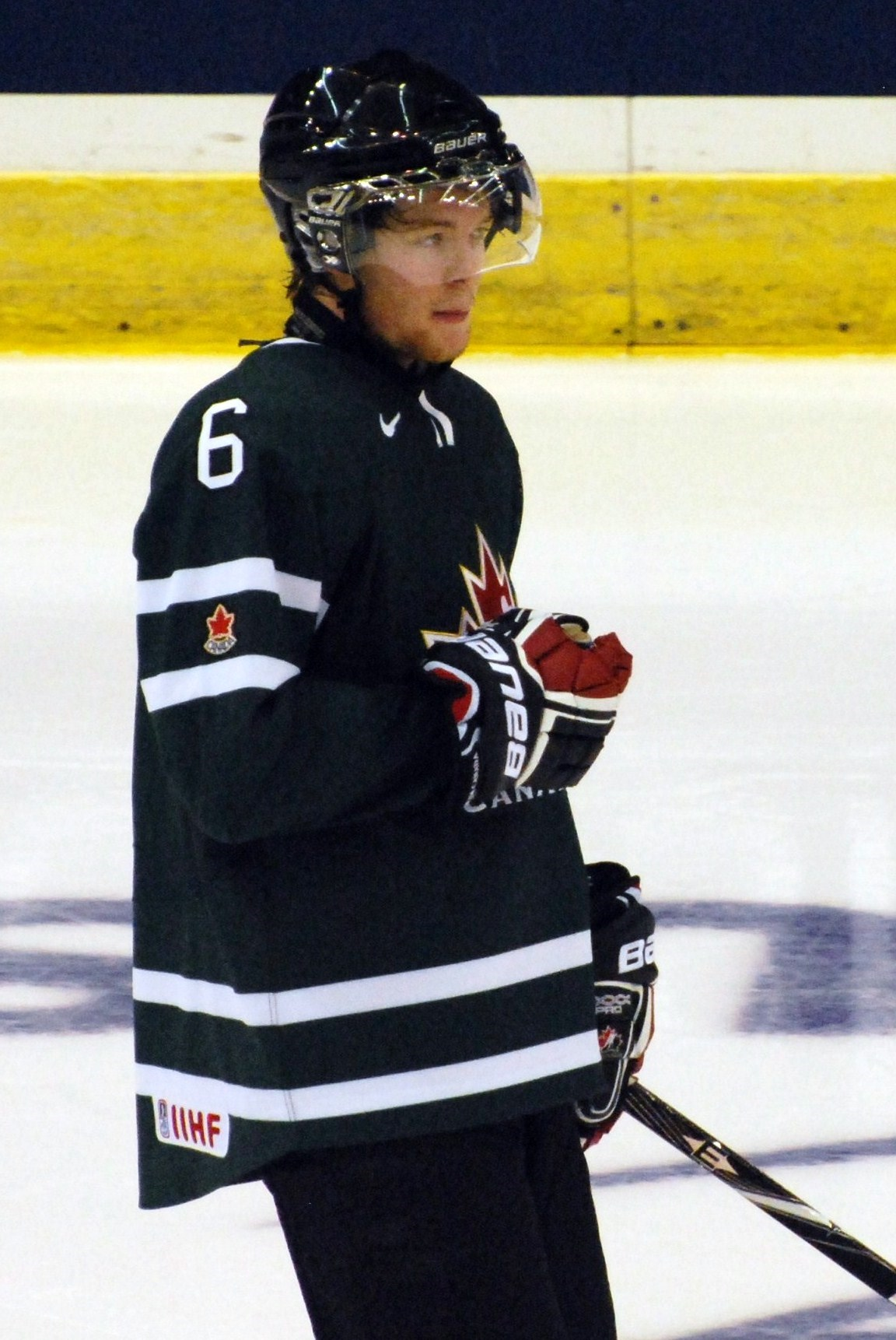
Ryan Ellis was taken 11th overall in 2009

== See also ==
- List of Nashville Predators players
- 1998 NHL Expansion Draft
