= Igor Shadilov =

Russian ice hockey player

- Born: June 7, 1980 (age 45) Moscow, USSR
- Height: 6 ft 2 in (188 cm)
- Weight: 203 lb (92 kg; 14 st 7 lb)
- Position: Defence
- Shot: Left
- Played for: Dynamo Moscow; Ak Bars Kazan; Salavat Yulaev Ufa; Severstal Cherepovets; Severstal Cherepovets; THK Tver; Krylya Sovetov Moscow
- NHL draft: 249th overall, 1999; Washington Capitals
- Playing career: 1998–2013

Igor Shchadilov (born June 7, 1980) is a Russian former professional ice hockey defenceman. He was selected by the Washington Capitals in the ninth round (249th overall) of the 1999 NHL entry draft.

Shchadilov won the Russian Superleague championship four times, doing so in 2000, 2005, 2006, and 2008. He also won the Gagarin Cup in 2012.
