= Mattias Wennerberg =

Swedish ice hockey player

- Born: August 6, 1981 (age 44) Vilhelmina, Sweden
- Height: 6 ft 0 in (183 cm)
- Weight: 192 lb (87 kg; 13 st 10 lb)
- Position: Wing
- Shot: Left
- Played for: Modo Hockey; Timrå IK
- NHL draft: 194th overall, 1999; Chicago Blackhawks
- Playing career: 2000–2012

Mattias Wennerberg (born August 6, 1981) is a Swedish former professional ice hockey forward who played in the Swedish Hockey League (SHL).

== Playing career ==
The Chicago Blackhawks selected Wennerberg on June 26, 1999 as their sixth draft choice (194th overall). He was picked in the seventh round of the nine-round 1999 NHL entry draft.
