= Rail Rozakov =

Russian ice hockey player

- Born: March 29, 1981 (age 45) Murmansk, Soviet Union
- Height: 6 ft 1 in (185 cm)
- Weight: 207 lb (94 kg; 14 st 11 lb)
- Position: Defence
- Shot: Left
- Played for: CSK VVS Samara; Krylya Sovetov Moscow; Metallurg Novokuznetsk; HC CSKA Moscow; HC Lada Togliatti; Severstal Cherepovets; Lowell Lock Monsters; HC Sibir Novosibirsk; Vityaz Chekhov; Traktor Chelyabinsk; Barys Astana
- NHL draft: 106th overall, 1999; Calgary Flames
- Playing career: 1998–2009

Rail Rozakov (born March 29, 1981) is a Russian former professional ice hockey defenceman. He was drafted 106th overall in the 1999 NHL entry draft by the Calgary Flames.

== Career statistics ==
			Regular season					Playoffs
Season	Team	League	GP	G	A	Pts	PIM	GP	G	A	Pts	PIM
1998–99	Lada Togliatti-2	Russia3	30	0	0	0	14	—	—	—	—	—
1999–00	Lada Togliatti-2	Russia3	11	1	2	3	16	—	—	—	—	—
1999–00	CSK VVS Samara	Russia	2	0	0	0	0	—	—	—	—	—
1999–00	CSK VVS Samara-2	Russia3	2	0	2	2	8	—	—	—	—	—
1999–00	Krylya Sovetov Moscow	Russia2	23	0	1	1	41	—	—	—	—	—
2000–01	Metallurg Novokuznetsk	Russia	24	0	1	1	10	—	—	—	—	—
2001–02	CSK VVS Samara	Russia2	5	0	0	0	8	—	—	—	—	—
2001–02	HC CSKA Moscow	Russia	16	1	1	2	8	—	—	—	—	—
2002–03	Lada Togliatti	Russia	4	0	0	0	0	—	—	—	—	—
2002–03	Severstal Cherepovets	Russia	17	1	0	1	18	2	0	0	0	0
2003–04	Lowell Lock Monsters	AHL	2	0	0	0	4	—	—	—	—	—
2003–04	Severstal Cherepovets	Russia	16	0	1	1	34	—	—	—	—	—
2004–05	Severstal Cherepovets	Russia	17	0	0	0	8	—	—	—	—	—
2004–05	Sibir Novosibirsk	Russia	15	1	1	2	39	—	—	—	—	—
2005–06	Sibir Novosibirsk	Russia	37	0	1	1	81	4	0	0	0	2
2005–06	Sibir Novosibirsk-2	Russia3	1	0	0	0	2	—	—	—	—	—
2006–07	HC Vityaz Chekhov	Russia	19	0	0	0	43	—	—	—	—	—
2006–07	HC Vityaz Podolsk	Russia3	1	0	1	1	4	—	—	—	—	—
2007–08	Metallurg Novokuznetsk	Russia	41	0	1	1	50	—	—	—	—	—
2008–09	Traktor Chelyabinsk	KHL	8	0	0	0	2	—	—	—	—	—
2008–09	Barys Astana	KHL	5	0	0	0	4	—	—	—	—	—
Russia totals			208	3	6	9	291	6	0	0	0	2
