= René Vydarený =

Slovak ice hockey player

- Born: May 6, 1981 (age 45) Bratislava, Czechoslovakia
- Height: 6 ft 1 in (185 cm)
- Weight: 198 lb (90 kg; 14 st 2 lb)
- Position: Defence
- Shot: Left
- Played for: HC České Budějovice; HC Slovan Bratislava; Hamilton Bulldogs; Manitoba Moose; Columbia Inferno; Kansas City Blades
- National team: Slovakia
- NHL draft: 69th overall, 1999; Vancouver Canucks
- Playing career: 2000–2021

René Vydarený (born May 6, 1981) is a Slovak former professional ice hockey defenceman who last played for HC České Budějovice of the Czech Extraliga. Vydarený was drafted by the Vancouver Canucks of the National Hockey League in the 1999 NHL entry draft and then played one season with the Rimouski Océanic of the QMJHL. He spent several years in the minor leagues of North America, playing for the Kansas City Blades, the Columbia Inferno, the Manitoba Moose and the Hamilton Bulldogs before returning to Europe in 2004. Vydarený has also played for the Slovak national team in several international tournaments.

== Career statistics ==
=== Regular season and playoffs ===
			Regular season					Playoffs
Season	Team	League	GP	G	A	Pts	PIM	GP	G	A	Pts	PIM
1995–96	HC Slovan Bratislava	SVK U18	47	5	12	17	18	—	—	—	—	—
1996–97	HC Slovan Bratislava	SVK U18	47	24	35	59	35	—	—	—	—	—
1997–98	HC Slovan Bratislava	SVK U20	50	5	14	19	26	—	—	—	—	—
1998–99	HC Slovan Bratislava	SVK U20	42	4	7	11	65	2	0	0	0	2
1998–99	HK Trnava	SVK.2	20	1	6	7	6	—	—	—	—	—
1999–2000	Rimouski Océanic	QMJHL	51	7	23	30	41	14	2	2	4	20
2000–01	Kansas City Blades	IHL	39	0	1	1	25	—	—	—	—	—
2001–02	Columbia Inferno	ECHL	10	2	1	3	9	—	—	—	—	—
2001–02	Manitoba Moose	AHL	61	3	11	14	15	7	0	2	2	4
2002–03	Manitoba Moose	AHL	71	2	8	10	46	14	0	2	2	16
2003–04	Manitoba Moose	AHL	50	2	10	12	16	—	—	—	—	—
2003–04	Hamilton Bulldogs	AHL	13	0	3	3	2	10	0	1	1	9
2004–05	HC Slovan Bratislava	SVK	33	0	4	4	22	19	1	4	5	24
2005–06	HC České Budějovice	ELH	52	0	7	7	32	10	3	0	3	4
2006–07	HC Mountfield	ELH	44	4	5	9	40	11	1	1	2	8
2007–08	HC Mountfield	ELH	52	4	8	12	28	11	4	1	5	18
2008–09	HC Mountfield	ELH	46	3	13	16	32	—	—	—	—	—
2009–10	HC Mountfield	ELH	19	1	4	5	18	—	—	—	—	—
2009–10	HC Sparta Praha	ELH	31	1	6	7	18	4	0	0	0	4
2010–11	HC Mountfield	ELH	41	6	15	21	22	4	0	0	0	2
2011–12	HC Mountfield	ELH	48	4	6	10	30	2	0	0	0	2
2012–13	HC Mountfield	ELH	50	5	9	14	26	5	0	1	1	2
2013–14	Mountfield HK, a.s.	ELH	45	5	15	20	32	3	0	3	3	0
2014–15	Mountfield HK, a.s.	ELH	35	1	9	10	24	4	0	2	2	6
2015–16	Mountfield HK, a.s.	ELH	37	3	9	12	16	5	0	0	0	6
2016–17	Mountfield HK, a.s.	ELH	46	3	11	14	22	11	0	0	0	8
2017–18	Mountfield HK, a.s.	ELH	43	0	2	2	18	8	0	2	2	6
2018–19	ČEZ Motor České Budějovice	CZE.2	54	2	16	18	28	11	1	3	4	6
2019–20	ČEZ Motor České Budějovice	CZE.2	52	7	23	30	42	—	—	—	—	—
2020–21	ČEZ Motor České Budějovice	ELH	52	3	8	11	40	—	—	—	—	—
2021–22	HC Samson České Budějovice	CZE.4	15	4	14	18	10	9	2	13	15	4
AHL totals			195	7	32	39	79	31	0	5	5	29
ELH totals			641	43	127	170	398	78	8	10	18	66

Medal record

Representing Slovakia

ice hockey

World U18 Championships
Bronze medal – third place	1999 Germany	

World Championships
Silver medal – second place	2012 Helsinki	

=== International ===
Year	Team	Event	Result	GP	G	A	Pts	PIM
1998	Slovakia	EJC18	6th	6	0	0	0	6
1999	Slovakia	WJC18	3rd place, bronze medalist(s)	7	0	0	0	2
2000	Slovakia	WJC	9th	7	0	0	0	2
2001	Slovakia	WJC	8th	7	0	3	3	0
2005	Slovakia	WC	5th	7	0	0	0	12
2006	Slovakia	WC	8th	7	1	0	1	6
2008	Slovakia	WC	13th	2	0	0	0	0
2009	Slovakia	WC	10th	6	0	1	1	0
2012	Slovakia	WC	2nd place, silver medalist(s)	10	0	0	0	2
2013	Slovakia	WC	8th	8	2	0	2	0
2014	Slovakia	OG	11th	3	0	0	0	2
Junior totals				27	0	3	3	10
Senior totals				43	3	1	4	22

- All statistics taken from NHL.com
