= John Cronin (ice hockey) =

American ice hockey player

- Born: May 1, 1980 (age 46) Duxbury, Massachusetts, U.S.
- Height: 6 ft .01 in (183 cm)
- Weight: 208 lb (94 kg; 14 st 12 lb)
- Position: Defense
- Played for: Boston University; ECHL
- NHL draft: 236th overall, 1999; Boston Bruins
- Playing career: 2002–2005

John Cronin (born May 1, 1980) is an American former ice hockey defenseman who played three seasons of professional hockey in the American Hockey League and ECHL from 2003 to 2005. He was selected by the Boston Bruins in the eighth round (236th overall) of the 1999 NHL entry draft. He graduated from Noble and Greenough School and was drafted as a senior, playing four years at Boston University.

== Career statistics ==
			Regular season					Playoffs
Season	Team	League	GP	G	A	Pts	PIM	GP	G	A	Pts	PIM
1999–00	Boston University	NCAA	28	3	5	8	26	—	—	—	—	—
2000–01	Boston University	NCAA	37	2	11	13	36	—	—	—	—	—
2001–02	Boston University	NCAA	32	1	8	9	20	—	—	—	—	—
2002–03	Boston University	NCAA	36	4	7	11	28	—	—	—	—	—
2003–04	Cincinnati Cyclones	ECHL	3	0	1	1	4	—	—	—	—	—
2003–04	Augusta Lynx	ECHL	63	4	9	13	34	—	—	—	—	—
2004–05	Augusta Lynx	ECHL	54	3	7	10	22	—	—	—	—	—
ECHL totals			120	7	17	24	60	—	—	—	—	—
