= Dmitri Levinsky =

Kazakhstani-Russian ice hockey player

- Born: June 23, 1981 (age 45) Ust-Kamenogorsk, Kazakh SSR, Soviet Union
- Height: 6 ft 1 in (185 cm)
- Weight: 203 lb (92 kg; 14 st 7 lb)
- Position: Forward
- Shot: Left
- Played for: HK Almaty; Arlan Kokshetau; Molot-Prikamye Perm; Ariada-Akpars Volzhsk; HC Dmitrov; HC Rys; Torpedo Nizhny Novgorod; Metallurg Novokuznetsk; Salavat Yulaev Ufa; Khimik Voskresensk; SKA St. Petersburg; Amur Khabarovsk; Severstal Cherepovets; HKm Zvolen; Yertis Pavlodar
- NHL draft: 46th overall, 1999; Chicago Blackhawks
- Playing career: 1999–2015

Dmitri Valerievich Levinsky (Russian: Дми́трий Валерьевич Ле́винский; born June 23, 1981) is a Kazakhstani-Russian retired professional ice hockey player. He last played for HK Almaty in the Kazakhstan Hockey Championship. He is the graduate of Ust-Kamenogorsk ice hockey school. He drafted 46th overall in the 1999 NHL entry draft by Chicago Blackhawks, but never signed a contract with them, and played his entire career in Russia and Kazakhstan.
