= Andrei Shefer =

Russian ice hockey player

- Born: July 26, 1981 (age 44) Yekaterinburg, USSR
- Height: 6 ft 0 in (183 cm)
- Weight: 198 lb (90 kg; 14 st 2 lb)
- Position: Defence
- Shoots: Left
- KHL team Former teams: Free Agent; Severstal Cherepovets; SKA Saint Petersburg; CSKA Moscow; HC Spartak Moscow; HC Ugra
- NHL draft: 43rd overall, 1999; Los Angeles Kings
- Playing career: 1999–present

Andrei Shefer (born July 26, 1981) is a Russian professional ice hockey defenceman who is currently an unrestricted free agent. He most recently played for HC Severstal of the Kontinental Hockey League (KHL). He was selected by the Los Angeles Kings in the 2nd round (43rd overall) of the 1999 NHL entry draft after making his professional debut with Severstal Cherepovets in the Russian Superleague.

After just seven games in the 2016–17 season, his 14th with Severstal, Shefer's contract was mutually terminated on September 22, 2016.
