= Johan Asplund (ice hockey) =

Swedish ice hockey player

- Born: December 15, 1980 (age 45) Skutskär, Sweden
- Height: 6 ft 1.7 in (187 cm)
- Weight: 207 lb (94 kg; 14 st 11 lb)
- Position: Goaltender
- Catches: Left
- DEN team: Nordsjælland Cobras
- NHL draft: 79th overall, 1999; New York Rangers
- Playing career: 1998–present

Johan Asplund (born December 15, 1980, in Skutskär, Sweden) is a goaltender for the Nordsjælland Cobras hockey team in the Danish Oddset Ligaen. He has also played seven seasons in Elitserien for Brynäs IF and most recently Timrå IK.

== Professional career ==
Season	Team	League
1998–2003	Brynäs IF	SEL
2004–2005	Nyköpings Hockey	Swe-2
2005–2007	Timrå IK	SEL
2007-	Nordsjælland Cobras Horsholm	DEN
