= Maxim Orlov =

Russian ice hockey player

- Born: March 31, 1981 (age 45) Moscow, USSR
- Height: 6 ft 0 in (183 cm)
- Weight: 176 lb (80 kg; 12 st 8 lb)
- Position: Forward
- Shoots: Left
- KAZ team Former teams: Arystan Temirtau; RSL; Traktor Chelyabinsk; HC CSKA Moscow; Salavat Yulaev Ufa
- NHL draft: 219th overall, 1999; Washington Capitals
- Playing career: 1998–present

Maxim Orlov (born January 31, March 31 or April 15, 1981) is a Russian professional ice hockey forward. He was selected by Washington Capitals in the 8th round (219th overall) of the 1999 NHL entry draft. Orlov has played in the Russian Superleague primarily with HC CSKA Moscow. He is currently playing for Arystan Temirtau in the Kazakhstan Hockey Championship league.
