= Alexander Chagodayev =

Russian ice hockey player (born 1981)

- Born: 15 January 1981 (age 45) Perm, USSR
- Height: 6 ft 2 in (188 cm)
- Weight: 198 lb (90 kg; 14 st 2 lb)
- Position: Forward
- Shot: Left
- Played for: Salavat Yulaev Ufa; Lokomotiv Yaroslavl; Lada Togliatti; Molot-Prikamye Perm; Vityaz Chekhov
- NHL draft: 105th overall, 1999; Mighty Ducks of Anaheim
- Playing career: 1999–2010

Alexander Chagodayev (born 15 January 1981) is a Russian former professional ice hockey forward.

== Career ==
Chagodayev played in the Russian Superleague for Salavat Yulaev Ufa, Lokomotiv Yaroslavl, Lada Togliatti, Molot-Prikamye Perm and Vityaz Chekhov. He was drafted 105th overall in the 1999 NHL entry draft by the Mighty Ducks of Anaheim.
