= Ryan Murphy (ice hockey, born 1979) =

American ice hockey player (born 1979)

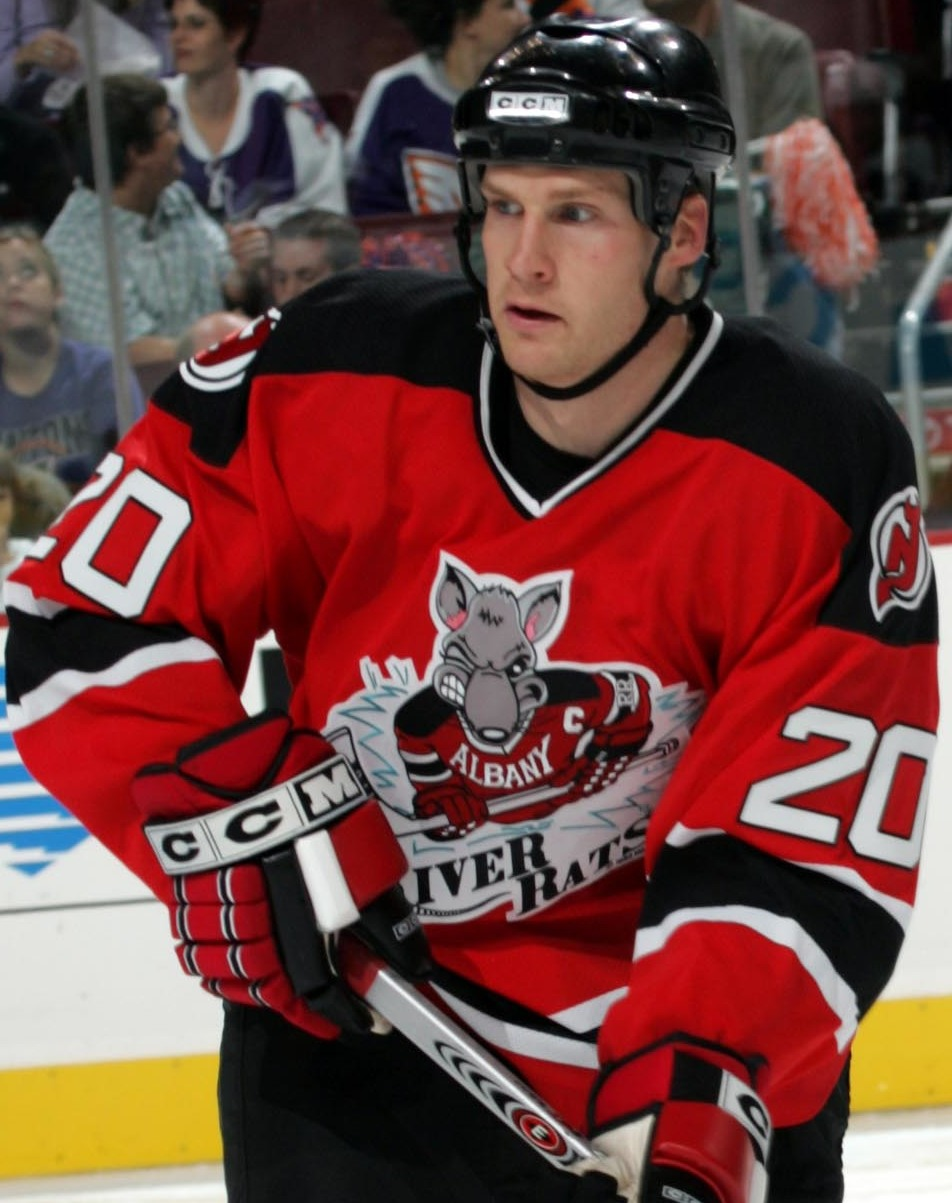
- Murphy with the Albany River Rats in 2005
- Born: March 21, 1979 (age 47) Van Nuys, California, U.S.
- Height: 6 ft 1 in (185 cm)
- Weight: 205 lb (93 kg; 14 st 9 lb)
- Position: Left wing
- Shot: Left
- Played for: AHL; Lowell Lock Monsters; Albany River Rats; Lowell Devils; Hamilton Bulldogs; ECHL; Florida Everblades; SM-liiga; Espoo Blues
- NHL draft: 113th overall, 1999; Carolina Hurricanes
- Playing career: 2001–2010

Ryan J. Murphy (born March 21, 1979) is an American professional ice hockey forward who played the 2009–10 season in both the AHL and SM-liiga. He was selected by the Carolina Hurricanes in the 4th round (113th overall) of the 1999 NHL entry draft.

== Amateur career ==
Murphy skated with the Thornhill Islanders in the Metro Junior A Hockey League before attending Bowling Green State University where he played four years of CCHA collegiate hockey with the Bowling Green Falcons men's ice hockey team (1997–2001).

Murphy played in the 1999 World Junior Ice Hockey Championships with Team USA.

== Professional career ==
Following graduation, Ryan turned professional for the 2001–02 ECHL season, playing up with the Florida Everblades of the East Coast Hockey League. Ryan went on to play nine seasons of professional hockey, suiting up for 372 AHL games and another 124 ECHL games.

On June 30, 2009, Murphy became an unrestricted free agent. On November 25, 2009 it was announced that the Hamilton Bulldogs (AHL) had signed Murphy to a professional tryout contract, however he played only five games for the Bulldogs before being released by the club.

Ryan is the son of former Los Angeles Kings and Toronto Maple Leafs head coach Mike Murphy.

== Career statistics ==
=== Regular season and playoffs ===
			Regular season					Playoffs
Season	Team	League	GP	G	A	Pts	PIM	GP	G	A	Pts	PIM
1997–98	Bowling Green Falcons	CCHA	36	3	9	12	27	—	—	—	—	—
1998–99	Bowling Green Falcons	CCHA	34	10	23	33	38	—	—	—	—	—
1999–00	Bowling Green Falcons	CCHA	36	9	10	19	63	—	—	—	—	—
2000–01	Bowling Green Falcons	CCHA	38	23	15	38	22	—	—	—	—	—
2001–02	Florida Everblades	ECHL	66	13	18	31	38	6	1	2	3	4
2002–03	Lowell Lock Monsters	AHL	12	1	2	3	4	—	—	—	—	—
2002–03	Florida Everblades	ECHL	58	28	17	45	47	1	0	0	0	0
2003–04	Albany River Rats	AHL	71	10	9	19	28	—	—	—	—	—
2004–05	Albany River Rats	AHL	75	13	23	36	44	—	—	—	—	—
2005–06	Albany River Rats	AHL	17	4	2	6	12	—	—	—	—	—
2006–07	Lowell Devils	AHL	69	17	21	38	22	—	—	—	—	—
2007–08	Lowell Devils	AHL	59	9	21	30	14	—	—	—	—	—
2008–09	Lowell Devils	AHL	64	9	21	30	14	—	—	—	—	—
2009–10	Espoo Blues	SM-liiga	3	0	1	1	0	—	—	—	—	—
2009–10	Hamilton Bulldogs	AHL	5	0	1	1	2	—	—	—	—	—
NCAA totals			144	45	57	102	150	—	—	—	—	—
ECHL totals			124	41	35	76	85	7	1	2	3	4
AHL totals			372	63	91	154	155	0	0	0	0	0
