= Teemu Sainomaa =

Finnish ice hockey player

- Born: May 15, 1981 (age 44) Helsinki, FIN
- Height: 6 ft 4 in (193 cm)
- Weight: 207 lb (94 kg; 14 st 11 lb)
- Position: Centre
- Shot: Left
- Played for: Jokerit; Pelicans
- NHL draft: 62nd overall, 1999; Ottawa Senators
- Playing career: 2000–2006

Teemu Sainomaa (born May 15, 1981) is a Finnish former professional ice hockey centre. He played in the SM-liiga for Jokerit and Pelicans. He was drafted 62nd overall in the 1999 NHL entry draft by the Ottawa Senators.
