= Alexei Bulatov =

Russian professional ice hockey forward

Nikita Tryamkin
- Born: January 24, 1978 (age 48) Sverdlovsk, Russian SFSR
- Height: 6 ft 1 in (185 cm)
- Weight: 205 lb (93 kg; 14 st 9 lb)
- Position: Forward
- Shoots: Left
- KHL team Former teams: Avtomobilist Yekaterinburg; Dynamo-Energia Yekaterinburg; Severstal Cherepovets; Salavat Yulaev Ufa; Spartak Moscow; Metallurg Novokuznetsk; Zauralie Kurgan; Molot-Prikamye Perm; Yugra Khanty-Mansiysk
- NHL draft: 254th overall, 1999; New York Rangers
- Playing career: 1997–present

Alexei Bulatov (Russian: Алексей Михайлович Булатов; born January 24, 1978) is a Russian professional ice hockey forward. He currently plays for Avtomobilist Yekaterinburg in the Kontinental Hockey League. Bulatov was selected by the New York Rangers in the 9th round (254th overall) of the 1999 NHL entry draft.
