= Antti Jokela =

Finnish ice hockey player (born 1981)

- Born: May 7, 1981 (age 45) Rauma, FIN
- Height: 6 ft 0 in (183 cm)
- Weight: 181 lb (82 kg; 12 st 13 lb)
- Position: Goaltender
- Caught: Left
- Played for: Lukko; Ässät; Timrå IK; Brynäs IF
- NHL draft: 237th overall, 1999; Carolina Hurricanes
- Playing career: 2000–2008

Antti Jokela (born May 7, 1981) is a Finnish former professional ice hockey goaltender. He played in the SM-liiga for Lukko and Ässät and also played in Sweden in the Elitserien for Timrå IK and Brynäs IF. He was drafted 237th overall by the Carolina Hurricanes in the 1999 NHL entry draft.
