= 1999 NHL entry draft =

1999 North American ice hockey draft

General information
- Date: June 26, 1999
- Location: FleetCenter; Boston, Massachusetts, U.S.
- Network: CTV Sportsnet (Canada) ESPN 2 (United States)

Overview
- 272 total selections in 9 rounds
- First selection: (Czech Republic) Patrik Stefan (Atlanta Thrashers)
- Hall of Famers: 2: LW Daniel Sedin; C Henrik Sedin

The 1999 NHL entry draft was the 37th draft for the National Hockey League. It was held on June 26 at the FleetCenter in Boston. According to Sports Illustrated and other sports news agencies, at the time the 1999 draft was considered one of the deepest in talent in years, headed by Patrik Stefan and the Sedin twins, Daniel and Henrik.

As a result of the draft lottery, the first three picks going into draft day were held by the Tampa Bay Lightning, the Atlanta Thrashers expansion team, and the Vancouver Canucks, respectively. The Canucks were determined to select both Sedins and therefore initiated a trading carousel involving multiple teams. After the trading was done, the Lightning had traded out of the first round altogether while the Thrashers held the first overall pick. However, Atlanta had also agreed not to draft either of the Sedin twins. The Thrashers therefore selected Stefan while the Canucks used the second and third picks to select the Sedins.

The overall impact in the NHL of players selected has not matched that of the neighboring drafts. An example is how many first round picks have played the equivalent of an entire regular season ten seasons after the 1999 draft; only 16 out of 28 first round picks in 1999 have played 82 NHL games, while the same statistic applies to 23 out of 27 players in 1998 and 21 out of 30 players in 2000. In addition, while the Sedin twins excelled in the NHL, only Barret Jackman and Martin Havlat were still active players of the other 26 first-round picks in the NHL 15 years after the draft.

The last active player in the NHL from the 1999 draft class was Craig Anderson, who retired after the 2022–23 season, although he was re-drafted in 2001.

== Selections by round ==
Club teams are located in North America unless otherwise noted.

=== Round one ===
= NHL All-Star team ·	= NHL All-Star (Note: Players are identified as an All-Star if they were selected for the All-Star game at any time in their career.) ·	= NHL All-Star and NHL All-Star team ·	= Hall of Famers

#	Player	Nationality	NHL team	College/junior/club team
1	Patrik Stefan (C)	Czech Republic	Atlanta Thrashers (from Tampa Bay via Vancouver)^{1}	Long Beach Ice Dogs (IHL)
2	Daniel Sedin (LW)	Sweden	Vancouver Canucks (from Atlanta)^{2}	MODO (Sweden)
3	Henrik Sedin (C)	Sweden	Vancouver Canucks	MODO (Sweden)
4	Pavel Brendl (RW)	Czech Republic	New York Rangers (from Chicago via Vancouver and Tampa Bay)^{3}	Calgary Hitmen (WHL)
5	Tim Connolly (C)	United States	New York Islanders	Erie Otters (OHL)
6	Brian Finley (G)	Canada	Nashville Predators	Barrie Colts (OHL)
7	Kris Beech (C)	Canada	Washington Capitals	Calgary Hitmen (WHL)
8	Taylor Pyatt (LW)	Canada	New York Islanders (from Los Angeles)^{4}	Sudbury Wolves (OHL)
9	Jamie Lundmark (C)	Canada	New York Rangers (from Calgary)^{5}	Moose Jaw Warriors (WHL)
10	Branislav Mezei (D)	Slovakia	New York Islanders (from Montreal)^{6}	Belleville Bulls (OHL)
11	Oleg Saprykin (C)	Russia	Calgary Flames (from New York Rangers)^{7}	Seattle Thunderbirds (WHL)
12	Denis Shvidki (RW)	Ukraine	Florida Panthers	Barrie Colts (OHL)
13	Jani Rita (RW)	Finland	Edmonton Oilers	Jokerit (Finland)
14	Jeff Jillson (D)	United States	San Jose Sharks	Michigan Wolverines (NCAA)
15	Scott Kelman (C)	Canada	Phoenix Coyotes (from Anaheim)^{8}	Seattle Thunderbirds (WHL)
16	David Tanabe (D)	United States	Carolina Hurricanes	Wisconsin Badgers (NCAA)
17	Barret Jackman (D)	Canada	St. Louis Blues	Regina Pats (WHL)
18	Konstantin Koltsov (LW)	Belarus	Pittsburgh Penguins	Severstal Cherepovets (Russia)
19	Kirill Safronov (D)	Russia	Phoenix Coyotes	SKA St. Petersburg (Russia)
20	Barrett Heisten (LW)	United States	Buffalo Sabres	Maine Black Bears (NCAA)
21	Nick Boynton (D)	Canada	Boston Bruins	Ottawa 67's (OHL)
22	Maxime Ouellet (G)	Canada	Philadelphia Flyers (from Philadelphia via Tampa Bay, compensatory)^{9}	Quebec Remparts (QMJHL)
23	Steve McCarthy (D)	Canada	Chicago Blackhawks (from Detroit)^{10}	Kootenay Ice (WHL)
24	Luca Cereda (C)	Switzerland	Toronto Maple Leafs	HC Ambri-Piotta (Switzerland)
25	Mikhail Kuleshov (LW)	Russia	Colorado Avalanche	Severstal Cherepovets (Russia)
26	Martin Havlat (C)	Czech Republic	Ottawa Senators	Ocelari Trinec (Czech Republic)
27	Ari Ahonen (G)	Finland	New Jersey Devils	JYP (Finland)
28	Kristian Kudroc (D)	Slovakia	New York Islanders (from Dallas)^{11}	Michalovce (Slovakia)

1. Vancouver's acquired first-round pick went to Atlanta as the result of a trade on June 26, 1999, that sent a first-round pick (# 2 overall) in the 1999 Entry Draft and a conditional third-round pick in the 2000 entry draft to Vancouver in exchange for this pick.
  Vancouver previously acquired this pick as the result of a trade on June 26, 1999, that sent a first-round pick (# 4 overall) and two third-round picks (# 75 & 88 overall) in the 1999 Entry Draft in exchange for this pick.
2. Atlanta's first-round pick went to Vancouver as the result of a trade on June 26, 1999, that sent a first-round pick (# 1 overall) in the 1999 Entry Draft to Atlanta in exchange for a conditional third-round pick in the 2000 entry draft and this pick.
3. Tampa Bay's acquired first-round pick went to the Rangers as the result of a trade on June 26, 1999, that sent Dan Cloutier, Niklas Sundstrom, a first-round pick and a third-round pick in the 2000 entry draft to Tampa Bay in exchange for this pick.
  Tampa Bay previously acquired this pick as the result of a trade on June 26, 1999, that sent a first-round pick (# 1 overall) in the 1999 Entry Draft in exchange for two third-round picks (# 75 & 88 overall) in the 1999 Entry Draft and this pick.
  Vancouver previously acquired this pick as the result of a trade on June 25, 1999, that sent Bryan McCabe and Chicago's option of a first-round pick in the 2000 entry draft or 2001 entry draft in exchange for this pick.
4. Los Angeles' first-round pick went to the Islanders as the result of a trade on June 19, 1999, that sent Marcel Cousineau, Zigmund Palffy, Bryan Smolinski and a fourth-round pick in the 1999 Entry Draft to Los Angeles in exchange for Mathieu Biron, Josh Green, Olli Jokinen and this pick.
5. Calgary's first-round pick went to the Rangers as the result of a trade on June 26, 1999, that sent Marc Savard and a first-round pick (# 11 overall) in the 1999 Entry Draft to Calgary in exchange for the rights to Jan Hlavac, a third-round pick in the 1999 Entry Draft and this pick.
6. Montreal's first-round pick went to the Islanders as the result of a trade on May 29, 1999, that sent Trevor Linden to Montreal in exchange for this pick.
7. The Rangers' first-round pick went to Calgary as the result of a trade on June 26, 1999, that sent the rights to Jan Hlavac, a first-round pick (# 9 overall) and third-round pick in the 1999 Entry Draft in exchange for Marc Savard and this pick.
8. Anaheim's first-round pick went to Phoenix as the result of a trade on June 26, 1999, that sent Oleg Tverdovsky to Anaheim in exchange for Travis Green and this pick.
9. Philadelphia's first-round pick was re-acquired as the result of a trade on August 20, 1997, that sent Karl Dykhuis and Mikael Renberg to Tampa Bay in exchange for first-round picks in the 1998 entry draft, 2000 entry draft and 2001 entry draft along with this pick.
  Tampa Bay previously acquired this pick along with first-round picks in the 1998 entry draft, 2000 entry draft and 2001 entry draft as compensation on August 20, 1997, after Philadelphia signed Group II free agent Chris Gratton.
10. Detroit's first-round pick went to Chicago as the result of a trade on March 23, 1999, that sent Chris Chelios to Detroit in exchange for Anders Eriksson, a first-round pick in the 2001 entry draft and this pick.
11. Dallas' first-round pick went to the Islanders as the result of a trade on June 26, 1997, that sent a second-round pick and a third-round in the 1999 Entry Draft to Dallas in exchange for this pick.

=== Round two ===
#	Player	Nationality	NHL team	College/junior/club team
29	Michal Sivek (C)	Czech Republic	Washington Capitals (from Tampa Bay)^{1}	Velvana Kladno (Czech Republic)
30	Luke Sellars (D)	Canada	Atlanta Thrashers	Ottawa 67's (OHL)
31	Charlie Stephens (C)	Canada	Washington Capitals (from Vancouver; compensatory via Colorado)^{2}	Guelph Storm (OHL)
32	Michael Ryan (C)	United States	Dallas Stars (from New York Islanders)^{3}	Northeastern Huskies (NCAA)
33	Jonas Andersson (RW)	Sweden	Nashville Predators	AIK IF Jr. (Sweden)
34	Ross Lupaschuk (D)	Canada	Washington Capitals	Prince Albert Raiders (WHL)
35	Milan Bartovic (RW)	Slovakia	Buffalo Sabres (from Los Angeles)^{4}	Dukla Trencin Jr. (Slovakia)
36	Alexei Semenov (D)	Russia	Edmonton Oilers (from Chicago)^{5}	Sudbury Wolves (OHL)
37	Nolan Yonkman (D)	Canada	Washington Capitals (compensatory)^{6}	Kelowna Rockets (WHL)
38	Dan Cavanaugh (C)	United States	Calgary Flames	Boston University Terriers (NCAA)
39	Alexander Buturlin (C)	Russia	Montreal Canadiens	CSKA Moscow (Russia)
40	Alex Auld (G)	Canada	Florida Panthers (from St. Louis; compensatory via Nashville)^{7}	North Bay Centennials (OHL)
41	Tony Salmelainen (LW)	Finland	Edmonton Oilers (compensatory)^{8}	HIFK (Finland)
42	Mike Commodore (D)	Canada	New Jersey Devils (compensatory)^{9}	North Dakota Fighting Hawks (NCAA)
43	Andrei Shefer (LW)	Russia	Los Angeles Kings (compensatory)^{10}	Severstal Cherepovets (Russia)
44	Jordan Leopold (D)	United States	Mighty Ducks of Anaheim (from New York Rangers via Ottawa)^{11}	Minnesota Golden Gophers (NCAA)
45	Martin Grenier (D)	Canada	Colorado Avalanche (from Florida via Nashville)^{12}	Quebec Ramparts (QMJHL)
46	Dmitri Levinsky (LW)	Kazakhstan	Chicago Blackhawks (from Edmonton)^{13}	Severstal Cherepovets (Russia)
47	Sheldon Keefe (RW)	Canada	Tampa Bay Lightning (from San Jose via Detroit)^{14}	Barrie Colts (OHL)
48	Simon Lajeunesse (G)	Canada	Ottawa Senators (from Anaheim)^{15}	Moncton Wildcats (QMJHL)
49	Brett Lysak (C)	Canada	Carolina Hurricanes	Regina Pats (WHL)
50	Brett Clouthier (LW)	Canada	New Jersey Devils (from St. Louis)^{16}	Kingston Frontenacs (OHL)
51	Matt Murley (LW)	United States	Pittsburgh Penguins	RPI Engineers (NCAA)
52	Adam Hall (RW)	United States	Nashville Predators (compensatory)^{17}	Michigan State Spartans (NCAA)
53	Brad Ralph (LW)	Canada	Phoenix Coyotes	Oshawa Generals (OHL)
54	Andrew Hutchinson (D)	United States	Nashville Predators (from Colorado; compensatory)^{18}	Michigan State Spartans (NCAA)
55	Doug Janik (D)	United States	Buffalo Sabres	Maine Black Bears (NCAA)
56	Matt Zultek (LW)	Canada	Boston Bruins	Ottawa 67's (OHL)
57	Jeremy Van Hoof (D)	Canada	Pittsburgh Penguins (compensatory)^{19}	Ottawa 67's (OHL)
58	Matt Carkner (D)	Canada	Montreal Canadiens (from Philadelphia)^{20}	Peterborough Petes (OHL)
59	David Inman (C)	Canada	New York Rangers (from Detroit)^{21}	Notre Dame Fighting Irish (NCAA)
60	Peter Reynolds (D)	Canada	Toronto Maple Leafs	London Knights (OHL)
61	Ed Hill (D)	United States	Nashville Predators (from Colorado)^{22}	Barrie Colts (OHL)
62	Teemu Sainomaa (LW)	Finland	Ottawa Senators	Jokerit Jr. (Finland)
63	Stepan Mokhov (D)	Kazakhstan	Chicago Blackhawks (from New Jersey)^{23}	Severstal Cherepovets (Russia)
64	Michael Zigomanis (C)	Canada	Buffalo Sabres (from Dallas)^{24}	Kingston Frontenacs (OHL)
65	Jan Lasak (G)	Slovakia	Nashville Predators (compensatory)^{25}	HKm Zvolen (Slovakia)
66	Dan Jancevski (LW)	Canada	Dallas Stars (from St. Louis; compensatory)^{26}	London Knights (OHL)

1. Tampa Bay's third-round pick went to Washington as the result of a trade on June 18, 1998, that sent Bill Ranford to Tampa Bay in exchange for a third-round pick in the 1998 entry draft and this pick.
2. Colorado's acquired second-round pick went to Washington as the result of a trade on March 23, 1999, that sent Dale Hunter and a third-round pick in the 2000 entry draft to Colorado in exchange for a second-round pick in the 1999 Entry Draft (this pick) or in the 2000 entry draft. Conditions of this draft pick are unknown.
  Colorado acquired this pick and $200,000.00 as compensation on February 1, 1999, after Vancouver hired Marc Crawford as head coach.
3. The Islanders' second-round pick went to Dallas as the result of a trade on June 26, 1999, that sent a first-round pick in the 1999 Entry Draft to the Islanders in exchange for a third-round pick in the 1999 Entry Draft and this pick.
4. Los Angeles' second-round pick went to Buffalo as the result of a trade on December 18, 1998, that sent Donald Audette to Los Angeles in exchange for this pick.
5. Chicago's second-round pick went to Edmonton as the result of a trade on March 20, 1999, that sent Jonas Elofsson, Dean McAmmond and Boris Mironov to Chicago in exchange for Daniel Cleary, Chad Kilger, Christian Laflamme and Ethan Moreau. Also, Edmonton had an option to swap second-round picks in the 1999 Entry Draft with Chicago (this pick).
6. Washington acquired this pick as compensation after Washington could not sign their first-round pick on the 1997 entry draft, Nick Boynton.
7. Nashville's acquired second-round pick went to Florida as the result of a trade on June 26, 1999, that sent a second-round pick (# 45 overall) in the 1999 Entry Draft and a third-round pick in the 2000 entry draft to Nashville in exchange for this pick.
  St. Louis' acquired second-round pick went to Nashville as the result of a trade on June 26, 1998, that sent future considerations (Nashville agreed to not select Jamie McLennan from Blues in 1998 NHL expansion draft) to St. Louis in exchange for Darren Turcotte and a conditional draft pick (highest compensatory pick in the 1999 Entry Draft (this pick) or a second-round pick in the 2000 entry draft.
  St. Louis previously acquired this pick as compensation on July 3, 1998, after Dallas signed free agent Brett Hull.
8. Edmonton acquired this pick as compensation on July 15, 1998, after Toronto signed free agent Curtis Joseph.
9. New Jersey acquired this pick as compensation on July 28, 1998, after Chicago signed free agent Doug Gilmour.
10. Los Angeles acquired this pick as compensation after Los Angeles could not sign their first-round pick on the 1997 entry draft, Matt Zultek.
11. Ottawa's acquired second-round pick went to Anaheim as the result of a trade on June 26, 1999, that sent a second-round pick (# 48 overall) and a sixth-round pick in the 1999 Entry Draft to Ottawa in exchange for this pick.
  Ottawa previously acquired this pick as the result of a trade on November 27, 1998, that sent Stanislav Neckar to the Rangers in exchange for Bill Berg and this pick.
12. Nashville's acquired second-round pick went to Colorado as the result of a trade on June 26, 1999, that sent two second-round picks (# 54 & 61 overall) in the 1999 Entry Draft to Nashville in exchange for a third-round pick in the 1999 Entry Draft and this pick.
  Nashville previously acquired this pick as the result of a trade on June 26, 1998, that sent a second-round pick in the 1999 Entry Draft to Florida in exchange for a third-round pick in the 2000 entry draft and this pick.
13. Edmonton's second-round pick went to Chicago as the result of a trade on March 20, 1999, that sent Daniel Cleary, Chad Kilger, Christian Laflamme and Ethan Moreau to Edmonton in exchange for Jonas Elofsson, Dean McAmmond and Boris Mironov. Also, Edmonton had an option to swap second-round picks in the 1999 Entry Draft with Chicago (this pick).
14. Detroit's acquired second-round pick went to Tampa Bay as the result of a trade on March 23, 1999, that sent Wendel Clark and a sixth-round pick in the 1999 Entry Draft to Detroit in exchange for Kevin Hodson and this pick.
  Detroit previously acquired this pick as the result of a trade on August 18, 1997, that sent Mike Vernon and a fifth-round pick in the 1999 Entry Draft to San Jose in exchange for a second-round pick in the 1998 entry draft and this pick.
15. Anaheim's second-round pick went to Ottawa as the result of a trade on June 26, 1999, that sent a second-round pick (# 44 overall) to Anaheim in exchange for a sixth-round pick in the 1999 Entry Draft and this pick.
16. St. Louis' second-round pick went to New Jersey as the result of a trade on November 26, 1996, that sent Mike Peluso and Ricard Persson to St. Louis in exchange for Ken Sutton and this pick.
17. Nashville acquired this pick as compensation on July 15, 1998, after Nashville signed free agent Mike Richter.
18. Colorado's acquired second-round pick went to Nashville as the result of a trade on June 26, 2000, that sent a second-round pick (# 45 overall) and a third-round pick in the 1999 Entry Draft to Colorado in exchange for a second-round pick (# 61 overall) in the 1999 Entry Draft and this pick.
  Colorado previously acquired this pick as compensation after Colorado could not sign their first-round pick on the 1997 entry draft, Kevin Grimes.
19. Pittsburgh acquired this pick as compensation on July 13, 1998, after Carolina signed free agent Ron Francis.
20. Philadelphia's second-round pick went to Montreal as the result of a trade on March 10, 1999, that sent Mark Recchi to Philadelphia in exchange for Dainius Zubrus, a sixth-round pick in the 2000 entry draft and Montreal's option of a second-round pick from Philadelphia in the 1999 Entry Draft (this pick) or 2000 entry draft or a second-round pick from the Islanders in the 2000 entry draft.
21. Detroit's second-round pick went to the Rangers as the result of a trade on March 23, 1999, that sent Ulf Samuelsson to Detroit in exchange for a third-round pick in the 2000 entry draft and this pick.
22. Colorado's second-round pick went to Nashville as the result of a trade on June 26, 2000, that sent a second-round pick (# 45 overall) and a third-round pick in the 1999 Entry Draft to Colorado in exchange for a second-round pick (# 54 overall) in the 1999 Entry Draft and this pick.
23. New Jersey's second-round pick went to Chicago as the result of a trade on August 25, 1998, that sent Chris Terreri to New Jersey in exchange for a conditional pick in the 1999 Entry Draft (this pick). Conditions of this draft pick are unknown.
24. Dallas' second-round pick went to Buffalo as the result of a trade on March 23, 1999, that sent Derek Plante to Dallas in exchange for this pick.
25. Nashville acquired this pick as compensation on July 7, 1998, after Nashville signed free agent Uwe Krupp.
26. St. Louis' acquired second-round pick went to Dallas as the result of a trade on June 20, 1999, that sent Roman Turek to St. Louis in exchange for this pick.
  St. Louis previously acquired this pick as compensation on July 2, 1998, after Los Angeles signed free agent Steve Duchesne.

=== Round three ===
#	Player	Nationality	NHL team	College/junior/club team
67	Evgeny Konstantinov (G)	Russia	Tampa Bay Lightning	Ital Kazan 2 (Russia)
68	Zdenek Blatny (LW)	Czech Republic	Atlanta Thrashers	Seattle Thunderbirds (WHL)
69	Rene Vydareny (D)	Slovakia	Vancouver Canucks	Slovan Bratislava Jr. (Slovakia)
70	Niklas Hagman (LW)	Finland	Florida Panthers (compensatory)^{1}	HIFK (Finland)
71	Jason Jaspers (C)	Canada	Phoenix Coyotes (from New York Islanders)^{2}	Sudbury Wolves (OHL)
72	Brett Angel (D)	Canada	Nashville Predators	North Bay Centennials (OHL)
73	Tim Preston (LW)	Canada	Buffalo Sabres (from Washington)^{3}	Seattle Thunderbirds (WHL)
74	Jason Crain (D)	United States	Los Angeles Kings	Ohio State Buckeyes (NCAA)
75	Brett Scheffelmaier (D)	Canada	Tampa Bay Lightning (from Vancouver; compensatory)^{4}	Medicine Hat Tigers (WHL)
76	Frantisek Kaberle (D)	Czech Republic	Los Angeles Kings (from Chicago)^{5}	MODO (Sweden)
77	Craig Anderson (G)	United States	Calgary Flames	Guelph Storm (OHL)
78	Mattias Weinhandl (RW)	Sweden	New York Islanders (from Montreal)^{6}	IF Troja/Ljungby (Sweden)
79	Johan Asplund (G)	Sweden	New York Rangers	Brynas IF (Sweden)
80	Jean-Francois Laniel (G)	Canada	Florida Panthers	Shawinigan Cataractes (QMJHL)
81	Adam Hauser (G)	United States	Edmonton Oilers	Minnesota Golden Gophers (NCAA)
82	Mark Concannon (LW)	United States	San Jose Sharks	Winchendon High School (USHS-Massachusetts)
83	Niclas Havelid (D)	Sweden	Mighty Ducks of Anaheim	Malmo IF (Sweden)
84	Brad Fast (D)	Canada	Carolina Hurricanes	Prince George Spruce Kings (BCJHL)
85	Peter Smrek (D)	Slovakia	St. Louis Blues	Des Moines Buccaneers (USHL)
86	Sebastien Caron (G)	Canada	Pittsburgh Penguins	Rimouski Oceanic (QMJHL)
87	Brian Collins (C)	United States	New York Islanders (from Phoenix)^{7}	St. John's High School (USHS-Massachusetts)
88	Jimmie Olvestad (LW)	Sweden	Tampa Bay Lightning (from Buffalo via Vancouver)^{8}	Djurgardens IF (Sweden)
89	Kyle Wanvig (RW)	Canada	Boston Bruins	Kootenay Ice (WHL)
90	Patrick Aufiero (D)	United States	New York Rangers (from Philadelphia via Calgary)^{9}	Boston University Terriers (NCAA)
91	Mike Comrie (C)	Canada	Edmonton Oilers (from Detroit via Nashville)^{10}	Michigan Wolverines (NCAA)
92	Cory Campbell (G)	Canada	Los Angeles Kings (from Toronto)^{11}	Belleville Bulls (OHL)
93	Branko Radivojevic (RW)	Slovakia	Colorado Avalanche (from Colorado via Nashville)^{12}	Belleville Bulls (OHL)
94	Chris Kelly (C/LW)	Canada	Ottawa Senators	London Knights (OHL)
95	Andre Lakos (D)	Austria	New Jersey Devils (from New Jersey via Toronto)^{13}	Barrie Colts (OHL)
96	Mathias Tjarnqvist (RW)	Sweden	Dallas Stars (from Dallas via New York Islanders)^{14}	Rogle BK (Sweden)

1. Florida acquired this pick as compensation on July 16, 1998, after Philadelphia signed free agent John Vanbiesbrouck.
2. The Islanders' third-round pick went to Phoenix as the result of a trade on March 20, 1999, that sent Brad Isbister and a third-round pick (# 87 overall) in the 1999 Entry Draft to the Islanders in exchange for Robert Reichel, a fourth-round pick in the 1999 Entry Draft and this pick.
3. Washington's third-round pick went to Buffalo as the result of a trade on March 23, 1999, that sent Alexei Tezikov and a fourth-round pick in the 1998 entry draft to Washington in exchange for Joe Juneau and this pick.
4. Vancouver's acquired third-round pick went to Tampa Bay as the result of a trade on June 25, 1999, that sent a first-round pick (# 1 overall) in the 1999 Entry Draft to Vancouver in exchange for a first-round pick (# 4 overall), a third-round pick (# 88 overall) in the 1999 Entry Draft and this pick.
  Vancouver previously acquired this pick as compensation on July 3, 1998, after Phoenix signed free agent Jyrki Lumme.
5. Chicago's third-round pick went to Los Angeles as the result of a trade on September 3, 1998, that sent Doug Zmolek to Chicago in exchange for this pick.
6. Montreal's third-round pick went to the Islanders as the result of a trade on March 9, 1999, that sent Scott Lachance to Montreal in exchange for this pick.
7. Phoenix's third-round pick went to the Islanders as the result of a trade on March 20, 1999, that sent Robert Reichel, a third-round pick (# 71 overall) and a fourth-round pick in the 1999 Entry Draft to Phoenix in exchange for Brad Isbister and this pick.
8. Vancouver's acquired third-round pick went to Tampa Bay as the result of a trade on June 25, 1999, that sent a first-round pick (# 1 overall) in the 1999 Entry Draft to Vancouver in exchange for a first-round pick (# 4 overall), a third-round pick (# 75 overall) in the 1999 Entry Draft and this pick.
  Vancouver previously acquired this pick as the result of a trade on February 4, 1998, that sent Geoff Sanderson to Buffalo in exchange for Brad May and this pick.
9. Calgary's acquired third-round pick went to the Rangers as the result of a trade on June 26, 1999, that sent Marc Savard and a first-round pick (# 11 overall) in the 1999 Entry Draft to Calgary in exchange for the rights to Jan Hlavac, a first-round pick (# 9 overall) in the 1999 Entry Draft and this pick.
  Calgary previously acquired this pick as the result of a trade on October 13, 1998, that sent the rights to Ryan Bast and an eighth-round pick in the 1999 Entry Draft to Philadelphia in exchange for this pick.
10. Nashville's acquired third-round pick went to Edmonton as the result of a trade on June 26, 1999, that sent Craig Millar to Nashville in exchange for this pick.
  Nashville previously acquired this pick as the result of a trade on July 14, 1998, that sent Doug Brown to Detroit in exchange for Petr Sykora, future considerations and this pick.
11. Toronto's third-round pick went to Los Angeles as the result of a trade on March 23, 1999, that sent Yanic Perreault to Los Angeles in exchange for Jason Podollan and this pick.
12. Colorado's third-round pick was re-acquired as the result of a trade on June 26, 1999, that sent two second-round picks (# 54 & 61 overall) in the 1999 Entry Draft to Nashville in exchange for a second-round pick (# 45 overall) in the 1999 Entry Draft and this pick.
  Nashville previously acquired this pick as the result of a trade on October 25, 1998, that sent Greg de Vries to Colorado in exchange for this pick.
13. New Jersey's third-round pick was re-acquired as the result of a trade on February 25, 1997, that sent Jason Smith, Steve Sullivan and the rights to Alyn McCauley to Toronto in exchange for Dave Ellett, Doug Gilmour and New Jersey's option of a fourth-round pick in the 1998 entry draft or third-round pick in the 1999 Entry Draft. New Jersey took this pick.
  Toronto previously acquired this pick as the result of a trade on March 13, 1996, that sent Dave Andreychuk to New Jersey in exchange for a second-round pick in the 1996 entry draft and Toronto's option of a fourth-round pick in the 1998 entry draft or third-round pick in the 1999 Entry Draft.
14. Dallas' third-round pick was re-acquired as the result of a trade on June 26, 1999, that sent a first-round pick in the 1999 Entry Draft to the Islanders in exchange for a second-round pick in the 1999 Entry Draft and this pick.
  The Islanders previously acquired this pick as the result of a trade on June 25, 1999, that sent Warren Luhning to Dallas in exchange for this pick.

=== Round four ===
#	Player	Nationality	NHL team	College/junior/club team
97	Chris Dyment (D)	United States	Montreal Canadiens (from Tampa Bay via Chicago)^{1}	Boston University Terriers (NCAA)
98	David Kaczowka (LW)	Canada	Atlanta Thrashers	Seattle Thunderbirds (WHL)
99	Rob Zepp (G)	Canada	Atlanta Thrashers (from Vancouver)^{2}	Plymouth Whalers (OHL)
100	Teemu Kesa (D)	Finland	New Jersey Devils (compensatory)^{3}	Ilves Jr. (Finland)
101	Juraj Kolnik (RW)	Slovakia	New York Islanders	Rimouski Oceanic (QMJHL)
102	Johan Halvardsson (D)	Sweden	New York Islanders (from Nashville)^{4}	HV71 (Sweden)
103	Morgan McCormick (RW)	Canada	Florida Panthers (from Washington)^{5}	Kingston Frontenacs (OHL)
104	Brian McGrattan (RW)	Canada	Los Angeles Kings	Sudbury Wolves (OHL)
105	Alexander Chagodayev (C)	Russia	Mighty Ducks of Anaheim (from Chicago)^{6}	CSKA Moscow (Russia)
106	Rail Rozakov (D)	Russia	Calgary Flames	Lada Togliatti 2 (Russia)
107	Evan Lindsay (G)	Canada	Montreal Canadiens	Prince Albert Raiders (WHL)
108	Mirko Murovic (LW)	Canada	Toronto Maple Leafs (from New York Rangers)^{7}	Moncton Wildcats (QMJHL)
109	Rod Sarich (D)	Canada	Florida Panthers	Calgary Hitmen (WHL)
110	Jonathan Zion (D)	Canada	Toronto Maple Leafs (from Edmonton)^{8}	Ottawa 67's (OHL)
111	Willie Levesque (RW)	United States	San Jose Sharks	Northeastern Huskies (NCAA)
112	Sanny Lindstrom (D)	Sweden	Colorado Avalanche (from Anaheim)^{9}	Huddinge IK (Sweden)
113	Ryan Murphy (LW)	United States	Carolina Hurricanes	Bowling Green Falcons (NCAA)
114	Chad Starling (D)	Canada	St. Louis Blues	Kamloops Blazers (WHL)
115	Ryan Malone (LW)	United States	Pittsburgh Penguins	Omaha Lancers (USHL)
116	Ryan Lauzon (C)	Canada	Phoenix Coyotes	Hull Olympiques (QMJHL)
117	Karel Mosovsky (LW)	Czech Republic	Buffalo Sabres	Regina Pats (WHL)
118	Jaakko Harikkala (D)	Finland	Boston Bruins	Lukko (Finland)
119	Jeff Feniak (D)	Canada	Philadelphia Flyers	Calgary Hitmen (WHL)
120	Jari Tolsa (C)	Sweden	Detroit Red Wings	Frolunda HC Jr. (Sweden)
121	Evgeny Pavlov (RW)	Russia	Nashville Predators (from Toronto via Carolina)^{10}	Lada Togliatti (Russia)
122	Kristian Kovac (RW)	Slovakia	Colorado Avalanche	HC Kosice Jr. (Slovakia)
123	Preston Mizzi (C)	Canada	Phoenix Coyotes (from Ottawa via New York Islanders)^{11}	Peterborough Petes (OHL)
124	Alexander Krevsun (RW)	Kazakhstan	Nashville Predators (from Detroit; compensatory)^{12}	CSK VVS Samara (Russia)
125	Daniel Johansson (C)	Sweden	Los Angeles Kings (from New Jersey via New York Islanders)^{13}	MODO (Sweden)
126	Jeff Bateman (C)	Canada	Dallas Stars	Brampton Battalion (OHL)

1. Chicago's acquired fourth-round pick went to Montreal as the result of a trade on November 16, 1998, that sent Brad Brown, Dave Manson and Jocelyn Thibault to Chicago in exchange for Jeff Hackett, Alain Nasreddine, Eric Weinrich and this pick.
  Chicago previously acquired this pick as the result of a trade on July 17, 1998, that sent Michal Sykora to Tampa Bay in exchange for Mark Fitzpatrick and this pick.
2. Vancouver's fourth-round pick went to Atlanta as the result of a trade on June 25, 1999, that sent future considerations (Atlanta agreed to not select certain unspecified player(s) in the 1999 NHL expansion draft to Vancouver in exchange for a ninth-round pick in the 1999 Entry Draft and this pick.
3. New Jersey acquired this pick as compensation on July 30, 1998, after Toronto signed free agent Steve Thomas.
4. Nashville's fourth-round pick went to the Islanders as the result of a trade on April 13, 1999, that sent Andy Berenzweig to Nashville in exchange for this pick.
5. Washington's fourth-round pick went to Florida as the result of a trade on March 8, 1998, that sent Esa Tikkanen to Washington in exchange for Dwayne Hay and a conditional pick in the 1999 Entry Draft (this pick). Conditions of this draft pick are unknown.
6. Chicago's fourth-round pick went to Anaheim as the result of a trade on January 28, 1999, that sent Josef Marha to Chicago in exchange for this pick.
7. The Rangers' fourth-round pick went to Toronto as the result of a trade on October 14, 1998, that sent Mathieu Schneider to the Rangers in exchange for Alexander Karpovtsev and this pick.
8. Edmonton's fourth-round pick went to Toronto as the result of a trade on March 23, 1999, that sent Jason Smith to Edmonton in exchange for a second-round pick in the 2000 entry draft and this pick.
9. Anaheim's fourth-round pick went to Colorado as the result of a trade on March 24, 1998, that sent Josef Marha to Anaheim in exchange for Warren Rychel and a conditional pick in the 1999 Entry Draft (this pick) . Conditions of this draft pick are unknown.
10. Carolina's acquired fourth-round pick went to Nashville as the result of a trade on June 26, 1999, that sent Eric Fichaud to Carolina in exchange for future considerations and this pick.
  Carolina previously acquired this pick as the result of a trade on January 2, 1998, that sent Jeff Brown to Toronto in exchange for a conditional pick in the 1999 Entry Draft (this pick). Conditions of this draft pick are unknown.
11. The Islanders' acquired fourth-round pick went to Phoenix as the result of a trade on March 20, 1999, that sent Brad Isbister and a third-round pick (# 87 overall) in the 1999 Entry Draft to the Islanders in exchange for Robert Reichel, a third-round pick (# 71 overall) in the 1999 Entry Draft and this pick.
  The Islanders previously acquired this pick as the result of a trade on March 20, 1999, that sent Ted Donato to Ottawa in exchange for this pick.
12. Detroit's acquired fourth-round pick went to Nashville as the result of a trade on July 14, 1998, that sent Doug Brown to Detroit in exchange for Petr Sykora, a third-round in the 1999 Entry Draft and future considerations (this pick).
  Detroit acquired this pick as compensation on July 13, 1998, after San Jose signed free agent Bob Rouse.
13. The Islanders' acquired fourth-round pick went to Los Angeles as the result of a trade on June 19, 1999, that sent Mathieu Biron, Josh Green, Olli Jokinen and a first-round pick in the 1999 Entry Draft to the Islanders in exchange for Marcel Cousineau, Zigmund Palffy, Bryan Smolinski and this pick.
  The Islanders previously acquired this pick as the result of a trade on March 22, 1999, that sent Sergei Nemchinov to New Jersey in exchange for this pick.

=== Round five ===
#	Player	Nationality	NHL team	College/junior/club team
127	Kaspars Astasenko (D)	Latvia	Tampa Bay Lightning	Cincinnati Cyclones (IHL)
128	Derek MacKenzie (C)	Canada	Atlanta Thrashers	Sudbury Wolves (OHL)
129	Ryan Thorpe (LW)	Canada	Vancouver Canucks	Spokane Chiefs (WHL)
130	Justin Mapletoft (C)	Canada	New York Islanders	Red Deer Rebels (WHL)
131	Konstantin Panov (LW)	Russia	Nashville Predators	Kamloops Blazers (WHL)
132	Roman Tvrdon (C)	Slovakia	Washington Capitals	Dukla Trencin Jr. (Slovakia)
133	Jean-Francois Nogues (G)	Canada	Los Angeles Kings	Victoriaville Tigres (QMJHL)
134	Michael Jacobsen (D)	Canada	Chicago Blackhawks	Belleville Bulls (OHL)
135	Matt Doman (RW)	United States	Calgary Flames	Wisconsin Badgers (NCAA)
136	Dustin Jamieson (LW)	Canada	Montreal Canadiens	Sarnia Sting (OHL)
137	Garett Bembridge (RW)	Canada	New York Rangers	Saskatoon Blades (WHL)
138	Ryan Miller (G)	United States	Buffalo Sabres (from Florida)^{1}	Michigan State Spartans (NCAA)
139	Jonathan Fauteux (D)	Canada	Edmonton Oilers	Val-d'Or Foreurs (QMJHL)
140	Adam Johnson (D)	United States	New York Islanders (from San Jose via Florida)^{2}	Greenway High School (USHS-Minnesota)
141	Maxim Rybin (LW)	Russia	Mighty Ducks of Anaheim	Spartak Moscow (Russia)
142	William Magnuson (D)	United States	Colorado Avalanche (from Carolina)^{3}	Lake Superior State Lakers (NCAA)
143	Trevor Byrne (D)	United States	St. Louis Blues	Deerfield Academy (USHS-Massachusetts)
144	Tomas Skvaridlo (C)	Slovakia	Pittsburgh Penguins	HKm Zvolen Jr. (Slovakia)
145	Marc-Andre Thinel (D)	Canada	Montreal Canadiens (from Phoenix via San Jose)^{4}	Victoriaville Tigres (QMJHL)
146	Matt Kinch (G)	Canada	Buffalo Sabres	Calgary Hitmen (WHL)
147	Seamus Kotyk (G)	Canada	Boston Bruins	Ottawa 67's (OHL)
148	Michal Lanicek (G)	Czech Republic	Tampa Bay Lightning (from Philadelphia)^{5}	Slavia Praha Jr. (Czech Republic)
149	Andrei Maximenko (D)	Russia	Detroit Red Wings (from Detroit via San Jose)^{6}	Krylya Sovetov (Russia)
150	Matt Shasby (D)	United States	Montreal Canadiens (compensatory)^{7}	Des Moines Buccaneers (USHL)
151	Vaclav Zavoral (D)	Czech Republic	Toronto Maple Leafs	Chernopetrol Litvinov Jr. (Czech Republic)
152	Jordan Krestanovich (LW)	Canada	Colorado Avalanche	Calgary Hitmen (WHL)
153	Jesse Cook (D)	United States	Calgary Flames (compensatory)^{8}	Denver Pioneers (NCAA)
154	Andrew Ianiero (LW)	Canada	Ottawa Senators	Kingston Frontenacs (OHL)
155	Niko Dimitrakos (RW)	United States	San Jose Sharks (from New Jersey)^{9}	Maine Black Bears (NCAA)
156	Gregor Baumgartner (LW)	Austria	Dallas Stars	Acadie-Bathurst Titan (QMJHL)
157	Vladimir Malenkikh (D)	Russia	Pittsburgh Penguins (compensatory)^{10}	Lada Togliatti (Russia)

1. Florida's fifth-round pick went to Buffalo as the result of a trade on March 23, 1999, that sent Mike Wilson to Florida in exchange for Rhett Warrener and this pick.
2. Florida's acquired fifth-round pick went to the Islanders as the result of a trade on June 26, 1999, that sent the rights to Jiri Dopita to Florida in exchange for this pick.
  Florida previously acquired this pick as the result of a trade on November 11, 1998, that sent Jeff Norton to San Jose in exchange for Alex Hicks and this pick.
3. Carolina's fifth-round pick went to Colorado as the result of a trade on June 1, 1998, that sent Randy Petruk to Carolina in exchange for this pick.
4. San Jose's acquired fifth-round pick went to Montreal as the result of a trade on March 23, 1999, that sent Vincent Damphousse to San Jose in exchange for a first-round pick in the 2000 entry draft, San Jose's option of a second-round pick in the 2000 entry draft or 2001 entry draft and this pick.
  San Jose previously acquired this pick as the result of a trade on June 27, 1998, that sent a fifth-round pick in the 1998 entry draft to Phoenix in exchange for this pick.
5. Philadelphia's fifth-round pick went to Tampa Bay as the result of a trade on March 20, 1999, that sent Mikael Andersson and Sandy McCarthy to Philadelphia in exchange for Colin Forbes and a conditional pick in the 1999 Entry Draft (this pick) or in the 2000 entry draft. Conditions of this draft pick are unknown.
6. Detroit's fifth-round pick was re-acquired as the result of a trade on June 26, 1999, that sent a fifth-round pick in the 2000 entry draft to San Jose in exchange for this pick.
  San Jose previously acquired this pick as the result of a trade on August 18, 1997, that sent a second-round pick in the 1998 entry draft and a second-round pick in the 1999 Entry Draft to Detroit in exchange for Mike Vernon and this pick.
7. Montreal acquired this pick as compensation on July 20, 1998, after Philadelphia signed free agent Marc Bureau.
8. Calgary acquired this pick as compensation on October 7, 1998, after Buffalo signed free agent James Patrick.
9. New Jersey's fifth-round pick went to San Jose as the result of a trade on August 26, 1998, that sent Ken Sutton to New Jersey in exchange for this pick.
10. Pittsburgh acquired this pick as compensation on August 28, 1998, after Anaheim signed free agent Fredrik Olausson.

=== Round six ===
#	Player	Nationality	NHL team	College/junior/club team
158	Anders Lovdahl (C)	Sweden	Colorado Avalanche (from Tampa Bay)^{1}	HV71 (Sweden)
159	Yuri Dobryshkin (RW)	Russia	Atlanta Thrashers	Krylya Sovetov (Russia)
160	Konstantin Rudenko (LW)	Kazakhstan	Philadelphia Flyers (from Vancouver)^{2}	Severstal Cherepovets Jrs. (Russia)
161	Jan Sochor (LW)	Czech Republic	Toronto Maple Leafs (from New York Islanders)^{3}	Slavia Praha (Czech Republic)
162	Timo Helbling (D)	Switzerland	Nashville Predators	HC Davos (Switzerland)
163	Bjorn Melin (RW)	Sweden	New York Islanders (from Washington)^{4}	HV71 (Sweden)
164	Martin Prusek (G)	Czech Republic	Ottawa Senators (from Los Angeles via Colorado and Chicago)^{5}	HC Vitkovice (Czech Republic)
165	Michael Leighton (G)	Canada	Chicago Blackhawks	Windsor Spitfires (OHL)
166	Cory Pecker (C)	Canada	Calgary Flames	Sault Ste. Marie Greyhounds (OHL)
167	Sean Dixon (D)	Canada	Montreal Canadiens	Erie Otters (OHL)
168	Erik Lewerstrom (D)	Sweden	Phoenix Coyotes (from New York Rangers via Montreal)^{6}	Grums IK (Sweden)
169	Brad Woods (D)	Canada	Florida Panthers	Brampton Battalion (OHL)
170	Matt Underhill (G)	Canada	Calgary Flames (compensatory)^{7}	Cornell Big Red (NCAA)
171	Chris Legg (C)	Canada	Edmonton Oilers	London Nationals (GOJHL)
172	Josh Reed (D)	Canada	Vancouver Canucks (from San Jose)^{8}	Vernon Vipers (BCJHL)
173	Jan Sandstrom (D)	Sweden	Mighty Ducks of Anaheim	AIK IF (Sweden)
174	Damian Surma (C)	United States	Carolina Hurricanes	Plymouth Whalers (OHL)
175	Kyle Clark (RW)	United States	Washington Capitals (from St. Louis)^{9}	Harvard Crimson (NCAA)
176	Doug Meyer (LW)	United States	Pittsburgh Penguins	Minnesota Golden Gophers (NCAA)
177	Jay Dardis (C)	United States	New York Rangers (from Phoenix)^{10}	Proctor High School (USHS-MN)
178	Seneque Hyacinthe (LW)	Canada	Buffalo Sabres	Val-d'or Foreurs (QMJHL)
179	Don Choukalos (G)	Canada	Boston Bruins	Regina Pats (WHL)
180	Tore Vikingstad (LW)	Norway	St. Louis Blues (from Philadelphia)^{11}	Farjestad BK (Sweden)
181	Kent McDonell (RW)	Canada	Detroit Red Wings (from Detroit via Tampa Bay)^{12}	Guelph Storm (OHL)
182	Fedor Fedorov (C)	Russia	Tampa Bay Lightning (from Toronto via New York Islanders)^{13}	Port Huron Border Cats (UHL)
183	Riku Hahl (C)	Finland	Colorado Avalanche	HPK (Finland)
184	Justin Cox (RW)	Canada	Dallas Stars (from Ottawa via Florida and Atlanta)^{14}	Prince George Cougars (WHL)
185	Scott Cameron (C)	Canada	New Jersey Devils	Barrie Colts (OHL)
186	Brett Draney (LW)	Canada	Dallas Stars	Kamloops Blazers (WHL)

1. Tampa Bay's sixth-round pick went to Colorado as the result of a trade on June 27, 1998, that sent a seventh, an eighth and a ninth-round pick in the 1999 Entry Draft to Tampa Bay in exchange for this pick.
2. Vancouver's sixth-round pick went to Philadelphia as the result of a trade on June 1, 1999, that sent the rights to Pat Kavanagh to Vancouver in exchange for this pick.
3. The Islanders' sixth-round pick went to Toronto as the result of a trade on January 9, 1999, that sent Felix Potvin and a sixth-round pick (# 182 overall) in the 1999 Entry Draft to the Islanders in exchange for Bryan Berard and this pick.
4. Washington's sixth-round pick went to the Islanders as the result of a trade on October 16, 1998, that sent Tom Chorske and an eighth-round pick in the 1999 Entry Draft to Washington in exchange for this pick.
5. Chicago's acquired sixth-round pick went to Ottawa as the result of a trade on March 12, 1999, that sent Radim Bicanek to Chicago in exchange for this pick.
  Chicago previously acquired this pick as the result of a trade on November 10, 1998, that sent Cam Russell to Colorado in exchange for Roman Vopat and this pick.
  Colorado previously acquired this pick as the result of a trade on October 29, 1998, that sent Eric Lacroix to Los Angeles in exchange for Roman Vopat and this pick.
6. Montreal's acquired sixth-round pick went to Phoenix as the result of a trade on June 26, 1999, that sent Jim Cummins to Montreal in exchange for this pick.
  Montreal previously acquired this pick as the result of a trade on June 30, 1998, that sent Peter Popovic to the Rangers in exchange for Sylvain Blouin and this pick.
7. Calgary acquired this pick as compensation on August 25, 1998, after San Jose signed free agent Ron Stern.
8. San Jose's sixth-round pick went to Vancouver as the result of a trade on June 26, 1999, that sent a sixth-round pick in the 2001 entry draft to San Jose in exchange for this pick.
9. St. Louis' sixth-round pick went to Washington as the result of a trade on March 18, 1999, that sent Brad Shaw and an eighth-round pick in the 1999 Entry Draft to St. Louis in exchange for this pick.
10. Phoenix's sixth-round pick went to the Rangers as the result of a trade on March 23, 1999, that sent Stanislav Neckar to Phoenix in exchange for Jason Doig and this pick.
11. St. Louis acquired this pick as compensation on March 9, 1998, after Philadelphia hired Roger Neilson as head coach.
12. Detroit's sixth-round pick was re-acquired as the result of a trade on March 23, 1999, that sent Kevin Hodson and a second-round pick in the 1999 Entry Draft to Tampa Bay in exchange for Wendel Clark and this pick.
  Tampa Bay previously acquired this pick as the result of a trade on October 5, 1998, that sent Brent Gilchrist to Detroit in exchange for this pick.
13. The Islanders' acquired sixth-round pick went to Tampa Bay as the result of a trade on January 18, 1999, that sent Craig Janney to the Islanders in exchange for this pick.
  The Islanders previously acquired this pick as the result of a trade on January 9, 1999, that sent Bryan Berard and a sixth-round pick (# 161 overall) in the 1999 Entry Draft to Toronto in exchange for Felix Potvin and this pick.
14. Atlanta's acquired sixth-round pick went to Dallas as the result of a trade on June 26, 1999, that sent Per Svartvadet to Atlanta in exchange for this pick.
  Atlanta previously acquired this pick as the result of a trade on June 25, 1999, that sent Trevor Kidd to Florida in exchange for Gord Murphy, Daniel Tjarnqvist, Herbert Vasiljevs and this pick.
  Florida previously acquired this pick as the result of a trade on March 8, 1999, that sent Viacheslav Butsayev to Los Ottawa in exchange for this pick.

=== Round seven ===
#	Player	Nationality	NHL team	College/junior/club team
187	Ivan Rachunek (LW)	Czech Republic	Tampa Bay Lightning	ZPS Zlin Jr. (Czech Republic)
188	Stephen Baby (RW)	United States	Atlanta Thrashers	Green Bay Gamblers (USHL)
189	Kevin Swanson (G)	Canada	Vancouver Canucks	Kelowna Rockets (WHL)
190	Blair Stayzer (LW)	Canada	Calgary Flames (from New York Islanders)^{1}	Windsor Spitfires (OHL)
191	Martin Erat (RW)	Czech Republic	Nashville Predators	ZPS Zlin Jr. (Czech Republic)
192	David Bornhammar (D)	Sweden	Washington Capitals	AIK IF Jr. (Sweden)
193	Kevin Baker (RW)	Canada	Los Angeles Kings	Belleville Bulls (OHL)
194	Mattias Wennerberg (C)	Sweden	Chicago Blackhawks	MODO Jr. (Sweden)
195	Yorick Treille (RW)	France	Chicago Blackhawks (from Calgary)^{2}	UMass Lowell River Hawks (NCAA)
196	Vadim Tarasov (G)	Kazakhstan	Montreal Canadiens	Metallurg Novokuznetsk (Russia)
197	Arto Laatikainen (D)	Finland	New York Rangers	Espoo Blues (Finland)
198	Travis Eagles (RW)	Canada	Florida Panthers	Prince George Cougars (WHL)
199	Christian Chartier (D)	Canada	Edmonton Oilers	Saskatoon Blades (WHL)
200	Pavel Kasparik (C)	Czech Republic	Philadelphia Flyers (from San Jose)^{3}	IHC Pisek (Czech Republic)
201	Mikko Ruutu (LW)	Finland	Ottawa Senators (from Anaheim)^{4}	HIFK (Finland)
202	Jim Baxter (D)	Canada	Carolina Hurricanes	Oshawa Generals (OHL)
203	Phil Osaer (G)	United States	St. Louis Blues	Ferris State Bulldogs (NCAA)
204	Tom Kostopoulos (RW)	Canada	Pittsburgh Penguins	London Knights (OHL)
205	Kyle Kettles (G)	Canada	Nashville Predators (from Phoenix)^{5}	Neepawa Natives (MJHL)
206	Bret DeCecco (RW)	Canada	Buffalo Sabres	Seattle Thunderbirds (WHL)
207	Greg Barber (RW)	Canada	Boston Bruins	Victoria Salsa (BCJHL)
208	Vaclav Pletka (RW)	Czech Republic	Philadelphia Flyers	Ocelari Trinec (Czech Republic)
209	Layne Ulmer (C)	Canada	Ottawa Senators (compensatory)^{6}	Swift Current Broncos (WHL)
210	Henrik Zetterberg (LW)	Sweden	Detroit Red Wings	Timra IK (Sweden)
211	Vladimir Kulikov (G)	Russia	Toronto Maple Leafs	CSKA Moscow (Russia)
212	Radim Vrbata (RW)	Czech Republic	Colorado Avalanche	Hull Olympiques (QMJHL)
213	Alexandre Giroux (C/LW)	Canada	Ottawa Senators	Hull Olympiques (QMJHL)
214	Chris Hartsburg (RW)	United States	New Jersey Devils	Colorado College Tigers (NCAA)
215	Jeff MacMillan (D)	Canada	Dallas Stars	Oshawa Generals (OHL)

1. Calgary acquired this pick as compensation on July 22, 1998, after the Islanders hired Bill Stewart as head coach.
2. Calgary's seventh-round pick went to Chicago as the result of a trade on December 29, 1998, that sent Andrei Trefilov to Calgary in exchange for this pick.
3. San Jose's seventh-round pick went to Philadelphia as the result of a trade on August 6, 1998, that sent Johan Hedberg to San Jose in exchange for this pick.
4. Anaheim's seventh-round pick went to Ottawa as the result of a trade on June 26, 1999, that sent a second-round pick (# 44 overall) to Anaheim in exchange for a second-round pick (# 48 overall) in the 1999 Entry Draft and this pick.
5. Phoenix's seventh-round pick went to Nashville as the result of a trade on June 30, 1998, that sent Mike Sullivan to Phoenix in exchange for this pick.
6. Ottawa acquired this pick as compensation on August 27, 1998, after Buffalo signed free agent Randy Cunneyworth.

=== Round eight ===
#	Player	Nationality	NHL team	College/junior/club team
216	Erkki Rajamaki (LW)	Finland	Tampa Bay Lightning	HIFK (Finland)
217	Garnet Exelby (D)	Canada	Atlanta Thrashers	Saskatoon Blades (WHL)
218	Markus Kankaanpera (D)	Finland	Vancouver Canucks	JYP (Finland)
219	Maxim Orlov (C)	Russia	Washington Capitals (from New York Islanders)^{1}	CSKA Moscow (Russia)
220	Miroslav Durak (D)	Slovakia	Nashville Predators	Slovan Bratislava Jr. (Slovakia)
221	Colin Hemingway (RW)	Canada	St. Louis Blues (from Washington)^{2}	Surrey Eagles (BCJHL)
222	George Parros (RW)	United States	Los Angeles Kings	Chicago Freeze (NAHL)
223	Andrew Carver (D)	Canada	Chicago Blackhwaks	Hull Olympiques (OHL)
224	David Nystrom (LW)	Sweden	Philadelphia Flyers (from Calgary)^{3}	Frolunda HC Jr. (Sweden)
225	Mikko Hyytia (C)	Finland	Montreal Canadiens	JYP Jr. (Finland)
226	Yevgeni Gusakov (RW)	Russia	New York Rangers	Lada Togliatti-2 (Russia)
227	Jonathan Charron (G)	Canada	Florida Panthers	Val-d'or Foreurs (QMJHL)
228	Radek Martinek (D)	Czech Republic	New York Islanders (from Edmonton)^{4}	HC Ceske Budejovice (Czech Republic)
229	Eric Betournay (C)	Canada	San Jose Sharks	Acadie-Bathurst Titan (QMJHL)
230	Petr Tenkrat (RW)	Czech Republic	Mighty Ducks of Anaheim	Poldi Kladno (Czech Republic)
231	David Evans (RW)	United States	Carolina Hurricanes	Clarkson Golden Knights (NCAA)
232	Alexander Khavanov (D)	Russia	St. Louis Blues	Dynamo Moscow (Russia)
233	Darcy Robinson (D)	Canada	Pittsburgh Penguins	Saskatoon Blades (WHL)
234	Goran Bezina (D)	Switzerland	Phoenix Coyotes	HC Fribourg-Gotteron (Switzerland)
235	Brad Self (C)	Canada	Buffalo Sabres	Peterborough Petes (OHL)
236	John Cronin (D)	United States	Boston Bruins	Boston University Terriers (NCAA)
237	Antti Jokela (G)	Finland	Carolina Hurricanes (from Philadelphia)^{5}	Lukko Jr. (Finland)
238	Anton Borodkin (LW)	Russia	Detroit Red Wings	Kamloops Blazers (WHL)
239	Pierre Hedin (D)	Sweden	Toronto Maple Leafs	MODO (Sweden)
240	Jeff Finger (D)	United States	Colorado Avalanche	Green Bay Gamblers (USHL)
241	Douglas Murray (D)	Sweden	San Jose Sharks (from Ottawa)^{6}	New York Apple Core (EJHL)
242	Justin Dziama (RW)	United States	New Jersey Devils	Nobles High School (USHS-Massachusetts)
243	Brian Sullivan (D)	United States	Dallas Stars	Thayer Academy (USHS-Massachusetts)

1. The Islanders' eighth-round pick went to Washington as the result of a trade on October 16, 1998, that sent a sixth-round pick in the 1999 Entry Draft to Washington in exchange for Tom Chorske and this pick.
2. Washington's eight-round pick went to St. Louis as the result of a trade on March 18, 1999, that sent a sixth-round pick in the 1999 Entry Draft to Washington in exchange for Brad Shaw and this pick.
3. Calgary eighth-round pick went to Philadelphia as the result of a trade on October 13, 1998, that sent a third-round pick in the 1999 Entry Draft to Calgary in exchange for the rights to Ryan Bast and this pick.
4. Edmonton's eighth-round pick went to the Islanders as the result of a trade on March 20, 1999, that sent Tommy Salo to Edmonton in exchange for the rights to Mats Lindgren and this pick.
5. Philadelphia's eighth-round pick went to Carolina as the result of a trade on May 25, 1999, that sent the rights to Francis Lessard to Philadelphia in exchange for this pick.
6. Ottawa's eighth-round pick went to San Jose as the result of a trade on June 27, 1998, that sent an eighth-round pick in the 1998 entry draft to Ottawa in exchange for this pick.

=== Round nine ===
#	Player	Nationality	NHL team	College/junior/club team
244	Mikko Kuparinen (D)	Finland	Tampa Bay Lightning	Grand Rapids Griffins (IHL)
245	Tommi Santala (C)	Finland	Atlanta Thrashers	Jokerit (Finland)
246	Ray DiLauro (D)	United States	Atlanta Thrashers (from Vancouver)^{1}	St. Lawrence Saints (NCAA)
247	Mikko Eloranta (LW)	Finland	Boston Bruins (from New York Islanders)^{2}	TPS (Finland)
248	Darren Haydar (RW)	Canada	Nashville Predators	New Hampshire Wildcats (NCAA)
249	Igor Shadilov (D)	Russia	Washington Capitals (from Washington via Chicago)^{3}	Dynamo Moscow (Russia)
250	Noah Clarke (LW)	United States	Los Angeles Kings	Des Moines Buccaneers (USHL)
251	Petter Henning (RW)	Sweden	New York Rangers (from Chicago)^{4}	MODO (Sweden)
252	Dmitri Kirilenko (C)	United States	Calgary Flames	CSKA Moscow (Russia)
253	Jerome Marois (LW)	Canada	Montreal Canadiens	Quebec Ramparts (QMJHL)
254	Alexei Bulatov (RW)	Russia	New York Rangers	Yekaterinburg (Russia)
255	Brett Henning (C)	United States	New York Islanders (from Florida)^{5}	Notre Dame Fighting Irish (NCAA)
256	Tamás Gröschl (RW)	Hungary	Edmonton Oilers	UTE Budapest (Hungary)
257	Hannes Hyvonen (RW)	Finland	San Jose Sharks	Espoo (Finland)
258	Brian Gornick (C)	United States	Mighty Ducks of Anaheim	Air Force Falcons (NCAA)
259	Yevgeni Kurilin (C)	Belarus	Carolina Hurricanes	Anchorage Aces (WCHL)
260	Brian McMeekin (D)	Canada	St. Louis Blues	Cornell Big Red (NCAA)
261	Andrew McPherson (LW)	Canada	Pittsburgh Penguins	RPI Engineers (NCAA)
262	Alexei Litvinenko (D)	Kazakhstan	Phoenix Coyotes	Torpedo Ust-Kamenogorsk (Kazakhstan)
263	Craig Brunel (RW)	Canada	Buffalo Sabres	Prince Albert Raiders (WHL)
264	Georgijs Pujacs (D)	Latvia	Boston Bruins	Dynamo-81 Riga (Latvia)
265	Jamie Chamberlain (RW)	Canada	Dallas Stars (from Philadelphia)^{6}	Peterborough Petes (OHL)
266	Ken Davis (RW)	Canada	Detroit Red Wings	Portland Winter Hawks (WHL)
267	Peter Metcalf (D)	United States	Toronto Maple Leafs	Maine Black Bears (NCAA)
268	Tyler Scott (D)	United States	New York Islanders (from Colorado)^{7}	Upper Canada College (HS-Ontario)
269	Konstantin Gorovikov (LW)	Russia	Ottawa Senators	SKA Saint Petersburg (Russia)
270	James Desmarais (C)	Canada	St. Louis Blues (from New Jersey)^{8}	Rouyn-Noranda Huskies (QMJHL)
271	Darrell Hay (D)	Canada	Vancouver Canucks (compensatory)^{9}	Tri-City Americans (WHL)
272	Mikhail Donika (D)	Russia	Dallas Stars	Yaroslavl Torpedo (Russia)

1. Vancouver's fourth-round pick went to Atlanta as the result of a trade on June 25, 1999, that sent future considerations (Atlanta agreed to not select certain unspecified player(s) in the 1999 NHL expansion draft to Vancouver in exchange for a fourth-round pick in the 1999 Entry Draft and this pick.
2. The Islanders' ninth-round pick went to Boston as the result of a trade on June 27, 1998, that sent a ninth-round pick in the 1998 entry draft to the Islanders in exchange for this pick.
3. Washington's ninth-round pick was re-acquired as the result of a trade on June 26, 1999, that sent a seventh-round pick in the 2000 entry draft to Chicago in exchange for this pick.
  Chicago previously acquired this pick as the result of a trade on October 15, 1998, that sent James Black to Washington in exchange for this pick.
4. Chicago's ninth-round pick went to the Rangers as the result of a trade on June 2, 1998, that sent Colin Pepperall to Chicago in exchange for this pick.
5. Florida's ninth-round pick went to the Islanders as the result of a trade on June 26, 1999, that sent an eighth-round pick in the 2000 entry draft to Florida in exchange for this pick.
6. Philadelphia's ninth-round pick went to Dallas as the result of a trade on June 27, 1998, that sent a ninth-round pick in the 1998 entry draft to Philadelphia in exchange for this pick.
7. Colorado'a ninth-round pick went to the Islanders as the result of a trade on June 26, 1999, that sent a ninth-round pick in the 2000 entry draft to the Islanders in exchange for this pick.
8. New Jersey's ninth-round pick went to St. Louis as the result of a trade on February 11, 1997, that sent Peter Zezel to New Jersey in exchange for Chris McAlpine and this pick.
9. Vancouver acquired this pick as compensation on March 17, 1999, after Phoenix signed free agent Brian Noonan.

== Draftees based on nationality ==
Rank	Country	Amount
	North America	158
1	Canada	108
2	United States	50
	Europe	113
3	Russia	27
4	Sweden	23
5	Czech Republic	18
6	Finland	18
7	Slovakia	12
8	Kazakhstan	5
9	Switzerland	3
10	Austria	2
10	Belarus	2
10	Latvia	2
13	Hungary	1
13	Norway	1
13	Ukraine	1
13	France	1

== Sedin Trades ==
Vancouver GM Brian Burke was determined to draft Daniel and Henrik Sedin, after their performance at the 1999 IIHF World Championship in Oslo, Norway. He began by complementing his existing third overall pick by trading defenseman Bryan McCabe and Vancouver's 1st-round pick in the 2000 Draft (used to select Pavel Vorobiev) to the Chicago Blackhawks for the fourth overall pick. Then he obtained the first overall pick from Tampa Bay, flipping Chicago's fourth overall pick — which the Lightning subsequently traded to the Rangers, who used it to draft Pavel Brendl — and two third-round selections. Vancouver and Atlanta then worked out a deal whereby Atlanta, who held the second overall selection, promised to select Patrik Stefan with the first overall pick, leaving both Sedins available to Vancouver at 2nd and 3rd.

== See also ==
- 1999 NHL expansion draft
- 1999–2000 NHL season
- List of NHL first overall draft choices
- List of NHL players
