= Alexander Krevsun =

Kazakhstani ice hockey player

- Born: June 2, 1980 Karaganda, Kazakh SSR, Soviet Union
- Died: July 3, 2002 (aged 22) Samara, Russia
- Height: 6 ft 1 in (185 cm)
- Weight: 216 lb (98 kg; 15 st 6 lb)
- Position: Winger
- Shot: Left
- Played for: HC Lada Togliatti; CSK VVS Samara; Krylya Sovetov Moscow; New Orleans Brass; Milwaukee Admirals
- NHL draft: 124th overall, 1999; Nashville Predators
- Playing career: 1997–2002

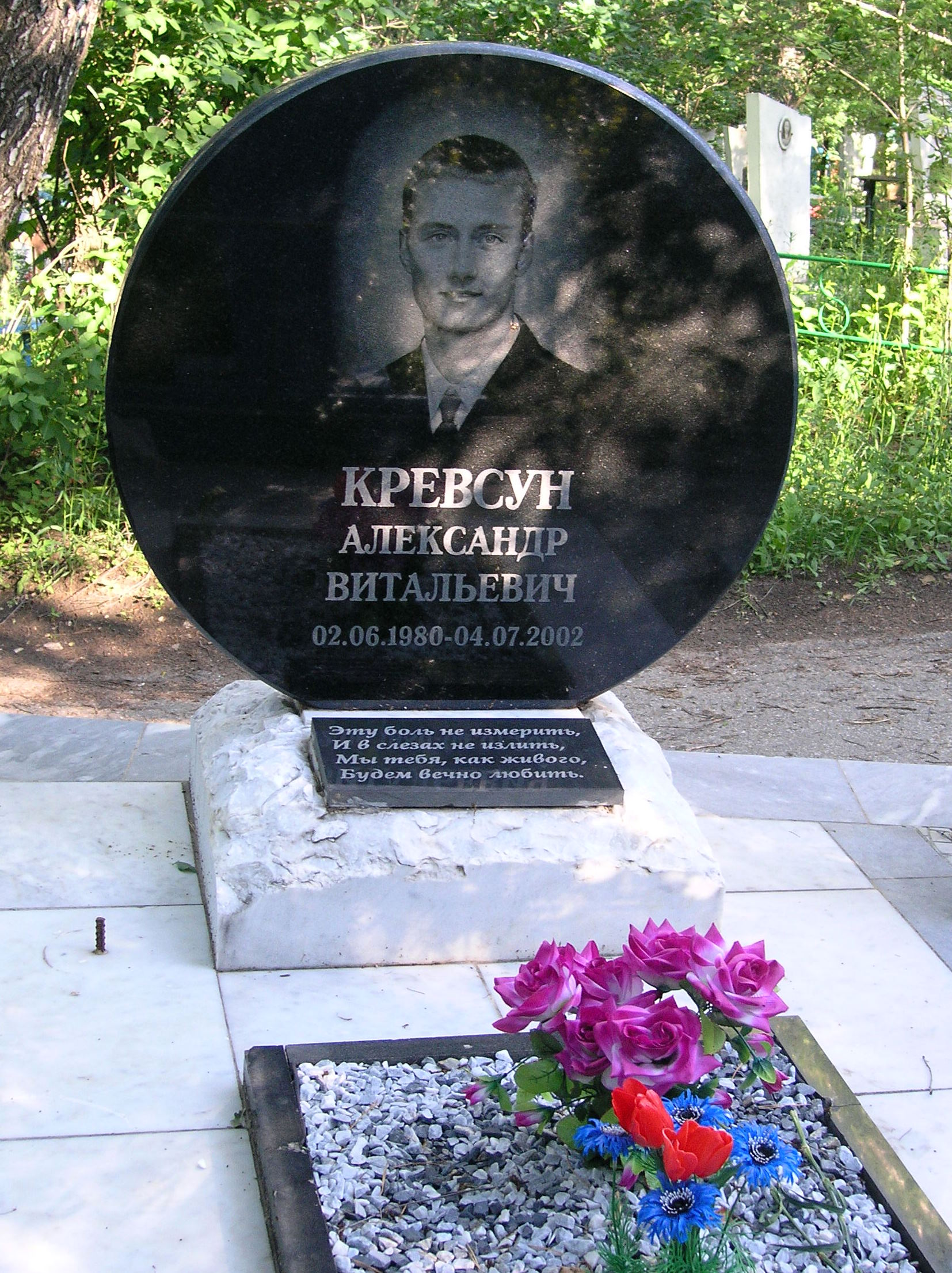
Grave of Alexander Krevsun

Alexander Vialevich Krevsun (Russian: Александр Витальевич Кревсун; June 2, 1980 — July 3, 2002) was a Kazakhstani professional ice hockey player. He was drafted 124th overall by the Nashville Predators in the 1999 NHL entry draft. He played one season for the organization, playing in the ECHL for the New Orleans Brass and one game in the American Hockey League for the Milwaukee Admirals before he was released and he returned to Russia, signing for CSK VVS Samara

Krevsun died on July 3, 2002, after suffering a brain hemorrhage during a cross-country preseason workout in Samara.
