= Jeff Foss =

American ice hockey player

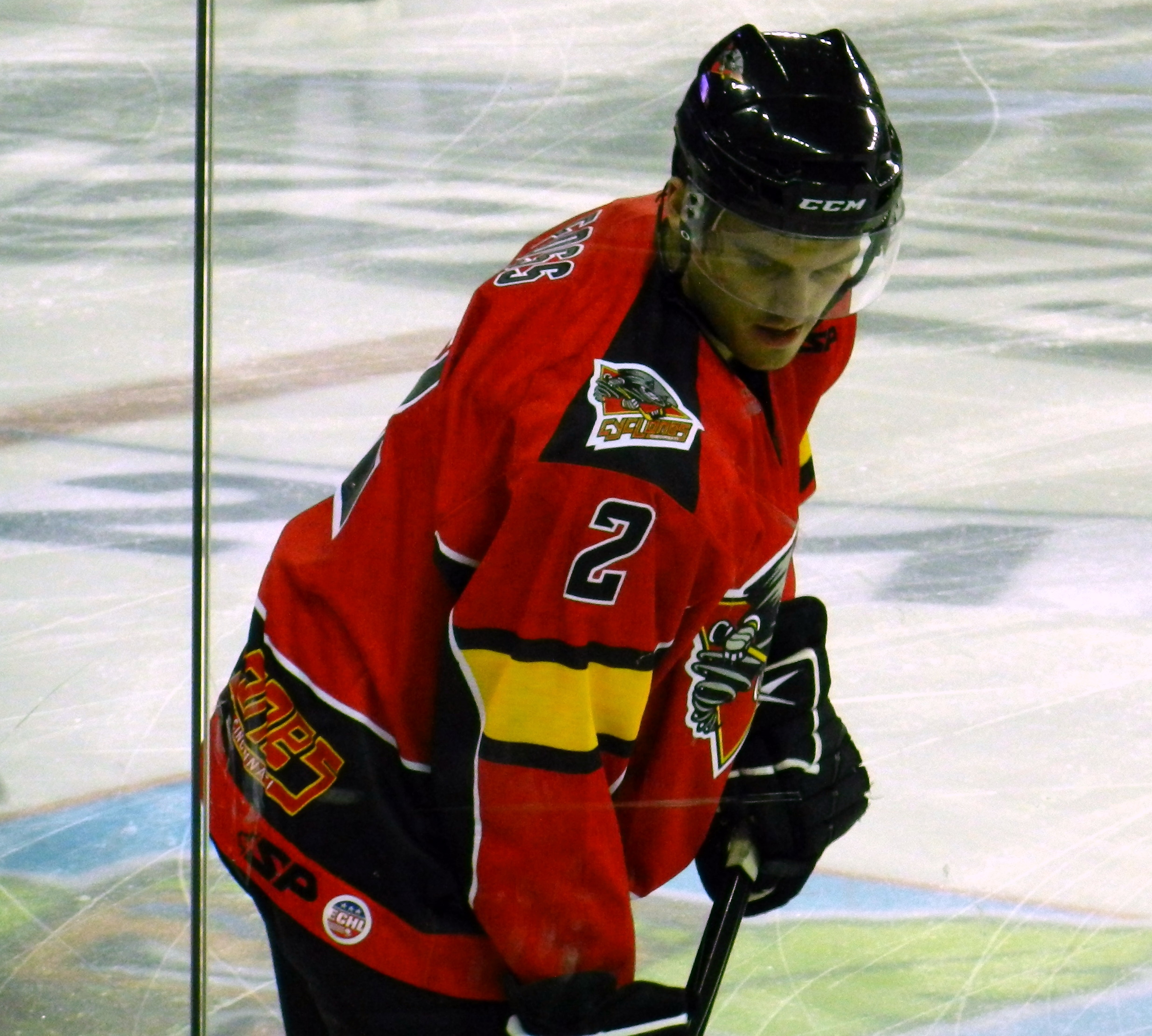
- Foss with the Cincinnati Cyclones in 2011
- Born: December 12, 1988 (age 37) Moorhead, Minnesota, U.S.
- Height: 6 ft 2 in (188 cm)
- Weight: 201 lb (91 kg; 14 st 5 lb)
- Position: Defense
- Shot: Right
- Played for: Milwaukee Admirals; KalPa
- NHL draft: 166th overall, 2008; Nashville Predators
- Playing career: 2011–2014

Jeffrey Brandt Foss (born December 12, 1988) is an American former professional ice hockey defenseman. He most notably played with the Milwaukee Admirals in the American Hockey League (AHL) and KalPa in the Finnish Liiga. Foss was selected by the Nashville Predators in the 6th round (166th overall) of the 2008 NHL entry draft.

Foss made his Liiga debut playing with KalPa during the 2013–14 Liiga season. He registered 2 assists in 58 games from the blueline with KalPa before opting to end his three year professional career.

== Career statistics ==
			Regular season					Playoffs
Season	Team	League	GP	G	A	Pts	PIM	GP	G	A	Pts	PIM
2006–07	Moorhead High	USHS	26	15	31	46	28	—	—	—	—	—
2006–07	Sioux Falls Stampede	USHL	11	0	1	1	10	4	0	1	1	2
2007–08	R.P.I.	ECAC	38	1	3	4	28	—	—	—	—	—
2008–09	R.P.I.	ECAC	39	2	9	11	58	—	—	—	—	—
2009–10	R.P.I.	ECAC	39	2	7	9	32	—	—	—	—	—
2010–11	R.P.I.	ECAC	38	3	11	14	48	—	—	—	—	—
2010–11	Milwaukee Admirals	AHL	5	0	1	1	10	—	—	—	—	—
2011–12	Milwaukee Admirals	AHL	28	0	0	0	32	2	0	0	0	4
2011–12	Cincinnati Cyclones	ECHL	11	0	1	1	4	—	—	—	—	—
2012–13	Cincinnati Cyclones	ECHL	6	0	1	1	2	17	0	2	2	14
2013–14	KalPa	Liiga	58	0	2	2	75	—	—	—	—	—
Liiga totals			58	0	2	2	75	—	—	—	—	—

== Awards and honors ==
Award	Year
USHL
Clark Cup (Sioux Falls Stampede)	2007
College
ECAC All-Academic Team	2008, 2009, 2010, 2011
