= Evgeny Pavlov =

Russian ice hockey player

- Born: 10 January 1981 (age 45) Togliatti, Soviet Union
- Height: 6 ft 0 in (183 cm)
- Weight: 196 lb (89 kg; 14 st 0 lb)
- Position: Forward
- Shot: Right
- Played for: HC Neftekhimik Nizhnekamsk; HC Lada Togliatti; CSK VVS Samara; Cincinnati Cyclones; Milwaukee Admirals; Sibir Novosibirsk; HC Spartak Moscow; Kristall Saratov
- NHL draft: 121st overall, 1999; Nashville Predators
- Playing career: 1996–2013

Evgeny Nikolaevich Pavlov (Russian: Евгений Николаевич Павлов; born 10 January 1981) is a Russian former professional ice hockey player. He was drafted 121st overall by the Nashville Predators in the 1999 NHL entry draft.
