= Miika Elomo =

Finnish ice hockey player (1977–2025)

- Born: 21 April 1977 Turku, Finland
- Died: 9 February 2025 (aged 47) Val d'Oise, France
- Height: 6 ft 0 in (183 cm)
- Weight: 180 lb (82 kg; 12 st 12 lb)
- Position: Left wing
- Shot: Left
- Played for: Washington Capitals
- NHL draft: 23rd overall, 1995; Washington Capitals
- Playing career: 1994–2005

Miika Elomo (21 April 1977 – 9 February 2025) was a Finnish professional ice hockey player.

== Playing career ==
Drafted 23rd overall by the Washington Capitals in the 1995 NHL entry draft, Elomo played just two games for the Capitals before he was traded in 2000 to the Calgary Flames, although he never played for the organization. He returned to Finland for the Espoo Blues. He retired after the 2004–05 season due to a wrist injury.

== Death ==
Elomo died at his home in Val d'Oise on 9 February 2025, at the age of 47, while he was serving as the coach of Ligue Magnus side Jokers. In October 2025, Le Parisien reported that the cause of death was suicide, but this claim was denied by Elomo's family. In October 2026, the French public prosecutor's office stated that the cause of death was an overdose, but this claim was also denied by the family. The family did not wish to disclose detailed forensic medical information concerning Elomo's health.

Elomo had married Maria Autio a few days before his death, on 4 February 2025.

== Career statistics ==
=== Regular season and playoffs ===
			Regular season					Playoffs
Season	Team	League	GP	G	A	Pts	PIM	GP	G	A	Pts	PIM
1993–94	TPS	FIN U18	7	4	4	8	14	2	0	2	2	0
1993–94	TPS	FIN U20	30	8	5	13	24	5	1	1	2	2
1994–95	TPS	FIN U18	4	1	2	3	6	8	4	6	10	30
1994–95	TPS	FIN U20	14	3	8	11	24	—	—	—	—	—
1994–95	TPS	SM-l	1	0	0	0	27	—	—	—	—	—
1994–95	Kiekko-67	FIN.2	14	9	2	11	39	—	—	—	—	—
1995–96	TPS	FIN U20	6	0	2	2	18	—	—	—	—	—
1995–96	TPS	SM-l	10	1	1	2	8	3	0	0	0	2
1995–96	Kiekko-67	FIN.2	21	9	6	15	100	—	—	—	—	—
1996–97	Portland Pirates	AHL	52	8	9	17	37	—	—	—	—	—
1997–98	Portland Pirates	AHL	33	1	1	2	54	—	—	—	—	—
1997–98	HIFK	SM-l	16	4	1	5	10	9	4	3	7	6
1998–99	TPS	SM-l	36	5	10	15	76	10	3	5	8	6
1999–2000	Washington Capitals	NHL	2	0	1	1	2	—	—	—	—	—
1999–2000	Portland Pirates	AHL	59	21	14	35	50	—	—	—	—	—
2000–01	Saint John Flames	AHL	72	10	21	31	109	6	0	2	2	12
2001–02	TPS	SM-l	24	3	4	7	84	—	—	—	—	—
2001–02	Blues	SM-l	28	2	2	4	44	—	—	—	—	—
2002–03	Blues	SM-l	50	8	5	13	28	7	1	1	2	2
2003–04	Blues	SM-l	50	3	6	9	20	9	0	0	0	4
2004–05	Blues	SM-l	15	0	0	0	25	—	—	—	—	—
SM-l totals			230	26	29	55	322	41	8	9	17	24
AHL totals			216	40	45	85	250	6	0	2	2	12

=== International ===
Year	Team	Event	GP	G	A	Pts	PIM
1994	Finland	EJC	5	1	1	2	6
1995	Finland	WJC	7	0	1	1	6
1995	Finland	EJC	5	3	3	6	10
1996	Finland	WJC	6	4	5	9	10
Junior totals			23	8	10	18	32

Preceded by Brad Church	Washington Capitals first-round draft pick 1995	Succeeded by Alexandre Volchkov
