= Alexander Volchkov (ice hockey, born 1977) =

- Born: September 25, 1977 (age 48) Moscow, Russian SFSR, Soviet Union
- Height: 6 ft 1 in (185 cm)
- Weight: 194 lb (88 kg; 13 st 12 lb)
- Position: Left wing
- Shot: Left
- Played for: Washington Capitals; HC CSKA Moscow; Vityaz Podolsk; HC Sibir Novosibirsk; Krylya Sovetov Moscow; Torpedo Nizhny Novgorod; Khimvolokno Mogilev; Junost Minsk; HC Neman Grodno
- NHL draft: 4th overall, 1996; Washington Capitals
- Playing career: 1994–2010

Alexander Aleksandrovich Volchkov (born September 25, 1977) is a Russian former professional ice hockey player.

== Early life ==
Volchkov was born in Moscow. As a youth, he played in the 1991 Quebec International Pee-Wee Hockey Tournament with a team from Moscow.

== Career ==
He was the Washington Capitals' first round draft pick at the 1996 NHL entry draft, picked fourth overall. He played three NHL games during his whole career, in the 1999–2000 season.

== Career statistics ==
=== Regular season and playoffs ===
			Regular season					Playoffs
Season	Team	League	GP	G	A	Pts	PIM	GP	G	A	Pts	PIM
1992–93	CSKA–2 Moscow	RUS.2	6	1	1	2	8	—	—	—	—	—
1994–95	CSKA Moscow	RUS	1	0	0	0	0	—	—	—	—	—
1995–96	Barrie Colts	OHL	47	37	27	64	36	7	2	3	5	5
1996–97	Barrie Colts	OHL	56	29	53	82	76	9	6	9	15	12
1996–97	Portland Pirates	AHL	—	—	—	—	—	4	0	0	0	0
1997–98	Portland Pirates	AHL	34	2	5	7	20	1	0	0	0	0
1998–99	Portland Pirates	AHL	27	3	8	11	24	—	—	—	—	—
1998–99	Cincinnati Cyclones	IHL	25	1	3	4	8	—	—	—	—	—
1999–2000	Washington Capitals	NHL	3	0	0	0	0	—	—	—	—	—
1999–2000	Portland Pirates	AHL	35	11	15	26	47	—	—	—	—	—
1999–2000	Hamilton Bulldogs	AHL	25	2	6	8	11	—	—	—	—	—
2000–01	Molot–Prikamye Perm	RSL	14	2	1	3	6	—	—	—	—	—
2000–01	Vityaz Podolsk	RSL	10	1	1	2	8	—	—	—	—	—
2001–02	Sibir Novosibirsk	RUS.2	50	19	34	53	63	11	5	1	6	20
2002–03	Krylya Sovetov Moscow	RSL	15	1	1	2	12	—	—	—	—	—
2002–03	Torpedo Nizhny Novgorod	RUS.2	7	1	1	2	10	6	1	1	2	20
2003–04	Khimvolokno Mogilev	BLR	42	25	12	37	81	2	0	0	0	4
2003–04	Khimvolokno Mogilev	EEHL	30	16	7	23	75	—	—	—	—	—
2003–04	Khimvolokno–2 Mogilev	BLR.2	1	0	2	2	0	—	—	—	—	—
2004–05	Khimvolokno Mogilev	BLR	41	4	16	20	50	8	1	3	4	2
2004–05	Khimvolokno–2 Mogilev	BLR.2	1	0	1	1	2	—	—	—	—	—
2005–06	Khimvolokno Mogilev	BLR	49	13	24	37	79	9	2	1	3	0
2006–07	Khimvolokno Mogilev	BLR	46	17	20	37	40	4	1	1	2	4
2007–08	HC Dmitrov	RUS.2	15	4	1	5	8	—	—	—	—	—
2007–08	Kapitan Stupino	RUS.2	15	7	5	12	12	—	—	—	—	—
2007–08	Yunost Minsk	BLR	18	8	7	15	10	11	2	0	2	4
2008–09	Yunost Minsk	BLR	38	12	13	25	20	—	—	—	—	—
2008–09	Neman Grodno	BLR	9	3	1	4	4	5	2	0	2	6
2009–10	Keramin Minsk	BLR	12	2	4	6	4	—	—	—	—	—
2009–10	Beybarys Atyrau	KAZ	18	7	9	16	51	10	1	3	4	4
2010–11	Yertis Pavlodar	KAZ	5	0	1	1	2	—	—	—	—	—
AHL totals			121	18	34	52	102	5	0	0	0	0
BLR totals			255	84	97	181	288	39	8	5	13	20

=== International statistics ===
Year	Team	Event	Result	GP	G	A	Pts	PIM
1997	Russia	WJC	3rd place, bronze medalist(s)	6	0	2	2	4

Preceded by Miika Elomo	Washington Capitals first-round draft pick 1996	Succeeded by Jaroslav Svejkovský
