= Sasha Pokulok =

Canadian ice hockey player (born 1986)

- Born: May 25, 1986 (age 39) Vaudreuil-Dorion, Quebec, Canada
- Height: 6 ft 5 in (196 cm)
- Weight: 220 lb (100 kg; 15 st 10 lb)
- Position: Defence
- Shot: Left
- LNAH team Former teams: Bâtisseurs de Montcalm; Hershey Bears; Springfield Falcons; San Antonio Rampage; DEG Metro Stars; KHL Medveščak Zagreb; Arlan Kokshetau
- NHL draft: 14th overall, 2005; Washington Capitals
- Playing career: 2006–2023

Sasha Grenier-Pokulok (born May 25, 1986 in Vaudreuil-Dorion, Québec) is a Canadian former ice hockey defenceman. He last played for Bâtisseurs de Montcalm of the Ligue Nord-Américaine de Hockey.

== Playing career ==
Pokulok played one season with the Notre Dame Hounds of the Saskatchewan Junior Hockey League. He spent two seasons with the Cornell Big Red of the ECAC Hockey League before signing an entry-level professional contract with the Capitals on July 6, 2006. Pokulok was drafted by the Washington Capitals 14th overall in the 2005 NHL entry draft.

On June 4, 2010, Pokulok left North America as a free agent and signed a one-year contract with German team, DEG Metro Stars of the DEL.

On July 5, 2012, Pokulok left Europe and signed a contract with Cornwall River Kings of the Ligue Nord-Américaine de Hockey. Pokulok skated with the River Kings over parts of four seasons, scoring 109 points in 119 games. While nursing a lower body injury, Pokulok was traded to the Saint-Georges Cool FM 103.5 on January 11, 2016 for utility player Maxime Vachon, a 2016 first round pick (1st overall), along with a 2016 fifth round pick (33rd overall). On August 31, 2022, Pokulok signed with Bâtisseurs de Montcalm, an LNAH expansion team, for their inaugural season.

== Career statistics ==
=== Regular season and playoffs ===
			Regular season					Playoffs
Season	Team	League	GP	G	A	Pts	PIM	GP	G	A	Pts	PIM
2002–03	Gatineau L'Intrépide	QMAAA	18	4	4	8	12	—	—	—	—	—
2003–04	Notre Dame Hounds AAA	SMHL	8	5	1	6	6	—	—	—	—	—
2003–04	Notre Dame Hounds	SJHL	39	7	16	23	34	—	—	—	—	—
2004–05	Cornell University	ECAC	26	3	7	10	33	—	—	—	—	—
2005–06	Cornell University	ECAC	27	4	9	13	49	—	—	—	—	—
2006–07	Hershey Bears	AHL	1	0	0	0	0	—	—	—	—	—
2006–07	South Carolina Stingrays	ECHL	16	3	6	9	22	—	—	—	—	—
2007–08	Hershey Bears	AHL	44	1	6	7	43	—	—	—	—	—
2007–08	South Carolina Stingrays	ECHL	5	0	6	6	6	18	0	6	6	18
2008–09	South Carolina Stingrays	ECHL	23	2	9	11	37	11	0	4	4	8
2008–09	Hershey Bears	AHL	8	0	0	0	8	—	—	—	—	—
2009–10	Bakersfield Condors	ECHL	49	13	26	39	64	10	1	2	3	9
2009–10	Springfield Falcons	AHL	7	0	5	5	2	—	—	—	—	—
2009–10	San Antonio Rampage	AHL	8	2	1	3	5	—	—	—	—	—
2010–11	DEG Metro Stars	DEL	52	4	11	15	36	—	—	—	—	—
2011–12	KHL Medveščak Zagreb	EBEL	45	6	7	13	46	—	—	—	—	—
2012–13	Cornwall River Kings	LNAH	21	9	17	26	8	—	—	—	—	—
2013–14	Arlan Kokshetau	KAZ	7	0	3	3	8	—	—	—	—	—
2013–14	Cornwall River Kings	LNAH	32	10	18	28	22	6	3	1	4	8
2014–15	Cornwall River Kings	LNAH	32	11	16	27	16	7	0	2	2	4
2015–16	Cornwall River Kings	LNAH	15	4	6	10	2	—	—	—	—	—
2015–16	Saint-Georges Cool FM 103.5	LNAH	11	1	3	4	0	5	2	1	3	0
2016–17	Saint-Georges Cool FM 103.5	LNAH	39	13	19	32	28	11	0	4	4	2
2017–18	Saint-Georges Cool FM 103.5	LNAH	36	7	12	19	12	9	2	3	5	4
2018–19	Les Pétroliers du Nord	LNAH	34	9	19	28	18	3	0	1	1	0
2019–20	Les Pétroliers du Nord	LNAH	36	21	39	60	30	—	—	—	—	—
2019–20	Soulanges Hockey Experts	LHSR	1	1	0	1	0	—	—	—	—	—
2021–22	Les Pétroliers du Nord	LNAH	19	7	10	17	10	—	—	—	—	—
2021–22	Trois-Rivières Lions	ECHL	1	0	1	1	0	—	—	—	—	—
2021–22	Jonquière Marquis	LNAH	9	2	3	5	6	8	1	5	6	8
2022–23	Bâtisseurs de Montcalm	LNAH	5	1	3	4	6	—	—	—	—	—
AHL totals			68	3	12	15	58	—	—	—	—	—
ECHL totals			94	18	48	66	129	39	1	12	13	35
LNAH totals			303	99	175	274	166	58	10	24	34	30

=== International ===
Medal record

Representing Canada

Ice hockey

World Junior Championships
Gold medal – first place	2006 Vancouver	

Year	Team	Event	Result	GP	G	A	Pts	PIM
2006	Canada	WJC	1st place, gold medalist(s)	6	0	0	0	0
Junior totals				6	0	0	0	0

== Awards and honors ==
Award	Year
All-ECAC Hockey Rookie Team	2004–05

Awards and achievements
Preceded by Mike Green	Washington Capitals first-round draft pick 2005	Succeeded by Joe Finley
