= Alexander Kharlamov =

Russian ice hockey player (born 1975)

- Born: September 23, 1975 (age 50) Moscow, Russian SFSR, Soviet Union
- Height: 5 ft 11 in (180 cm)
- Weight: 189 lb (86 kg; 13 st 7 lb)
- Position: Right wing
- Shot: Left
- Played for: HC CSKA Moscow; Portland Pirates; Hampton Roads Admirals; Metallurg Novokuznetsk; Bakersfield Condors; Tacoma Sabercats; HC Dynamo Moscow; SKA St. Petersburg
- National team: Russia
- NHL draft: 15th overall, 1994; Washington Capitals
- Playing career: 1992–2004

Alexander Valeryevich "Sasha" Kharlamov (Russian: Александр Валерьевич Харламов; born September 23, 1975) is a Russian former ice hockey player.

== Playing career ==
Kharlamov was selected in the first round of the 1994 NHL entry draft by the Washington Capitals, though he never played in the National Hockey League. He instead spent his career between Russia and the minor leagues of North America, and ultimately retired in 2004. Internationally he played for the Russian national junior team at the 1994 and 1995 World Junior Championships. Kharlamov was also the son of Soviet player Valeri Kharlamov.

== Career statistics ==
=== Regular season and playoffs ===
			Regular season					Playoffs
Season	Team	League	GP	G	A	Pts	PIM	GP	G	A	Pts	PIM
1992–93	CSKA Moscow	IHL	42	8	4	12	12	—	—	—	—	—
1992–93	CSKA–2 Moscow	RUS.2	3	1	0	1	0	—	—	—	—	—
1993–94	CSKA Moscow	IHL	46	7	7	14	26	3	1	0	1	2
1994–95	CSKA Moscow	IHL	45	8	4	12	12	—	—	—	—	—
1995–96	Portland Pirates	AHL	65	14	18	32	35	3	1	0	1	2
1996–97	Portland Pirates	AHL	56	9	15	24	28	—	—	—	—	—
1997–98	Hampton Roads Admirals	ECHL	70	22	14	36	77	20	2	13	15	16
1998–99	Metallurg Novokuznetsk	RSL	4	0	0	0	2	—	—	—	—	—
1998–99	Hampton Roads Admirals	ECHL	32	5	14	19	25	—	—	—	—	—
1999–2000	Tacoma Sabercats	WCHL	59	17	24	41	56	—	—	—	—	—
1999–2000	Bakersfield Condors	WCHL	6	0	2	2	4	4	0	3	3	4
1999–2000	Dynamo Moscow	RSL	11	0	1	1	4	—	—	—	—	—
2000–01	SKA St. Petersburg	RSL	14	2	5	7	4	—	—	—	—	—
2000–01	CSKA Moscow	RSL	3	0	0	0	0	—	—	—	—	—
2001–02	Vityaz Chekhov	RUS.2	34	1	7	8	6	—	—	—	—	—
2002–03	SKA St. Petersburg	RSL	14	1	5	6	4	—	—	—	—	—
2003–04	SKA St. Petersburg	RSL	5	0	0	0	0	—	—	—	—	—
IHL totals			133	23	15	38	50	3	1	0	1	2
AHL totals			121	23	33	56	63	12	2	3	5	8
RSL totals			51	3	11	14	14	—	—	—	—	—

=== International ===
Year	Team	Event	Result	GP	G	A	Pts	PIM
1993	Russia	EJC	2nd place, silver medalist(s)	6	2	5	7	2
1994	Russia	WJC	3rd place, bronze medalist(s)	7	4	1	5	4
1995	Russia	WJC	2nd place, silver medalist(s)	7	2	2	4	2
Junior totals				20	8	8	16	8

Preceded by Nolan Baumgartner	Washington Capitals first-round draft pick 1994	Succeeded by Brad Church
