= Jaroslav Svejkovský =

Czech ice hockey player and coach

- Born: October 1, 1976 (age 49) Plzeň, Czechoslovakia
- Height: 6 ft 0 in (183 cm)
- Weight: 195 lb (88 kg; 13 st 13 lb)
- Position: Left wing
- Shot: Right
- Played for: Washington Capitals; Tampa Bay Lightning
- NHL draft: 17th overall, 1996; Washington Capitals
- Playing career: 1996–2000

Jaroslav "Yogi" Svejkovský (born October 1, 1976) is a Czech ice hockey coach and former professional left wing. He currently serves as an assistant coach of the Philadelphia Flyers. He was drafted in the first round, 17th overall, by the Washington Capitals in the 1996 NHL entry draft, and played for them and the Tampa Bay Lightning.

== Career ==
=== As a player ===
Drafted from the Western Hockey League's Tri-City Americans, Svejkovský made his professional debut with the Portland Pirates of the American Hockey League in the 1996–97 season. He played a key part in the Pirates' offence; his 38 goals and 66 points earned him the Dudley "Red" Garrett Memorial Award as the league's best rookie. He made his NHL debut during the same season with the Capitals, appearing in 19 games and scoring seven goals. In the Capitals' last game of the 1996–97 season, Svejkovský scored four goals, as Washington beat the Buffalo Sabres 8–3. He remains the only Capitals rookie to date to score four goals in one game.

Svejkovský's subsequent playing years were plagued by injuries and inconsistent play. He played only 42 games over the next two seasons, missing significant time due to ankle injuries and a concussion. By mid-January 2000, Svejkovský had played only 23 of the Capitals' 37 games that season, missing seven games with a shoulder injury. He had served as a healthy scratch for seven of the Capitals' last eight games when, on January 17, he was traded to the Tampa Bay Lightning for a seventh-round draft pick in the 2000 NHL entry draft and a third-round pick in the 2001 draft. Up to that point, Svejkovský had not registered a goal since the Capitals' first game of the season.

Svejkovský finished the season with the Lightning, then was assigned to begin the 2000–01 season in the International Hockey League with the Detroit Vipers. He sustained a concussion during his second game for the Vipers, subsequently retiring from the sport without taking part in any more games. In a 2002 USA Today story, Tampa Bay Lightning general manager Jay Feaster said that Svejkovský was out of hockey due to post-concussion syndrome. In his NHL career, Svejkovský appeared in 113 games, scoring 23 goals and adding 19 assists.

=== As a coach ===
In 2024, Svejkovský was named an assistant coach for the Vancouver Canucks. He is also Director of Hockey Operations with the Seafair Minor Hockey Association, and Program Director of the BC Bears AAA spring hockey association.

On June 5, 2025, Svejkovský joined head coach Rick Tocchet in leaving Vancouver for Philadelphia, being named an assistant coach with the Philadelphia Flyers.

== Career statistics ==
=== Regular season and playoffs ===
			Regular season					Playoffs
Season	Team	League	GP	G	A	Pts	PIM	GP	G	A	Pts	PIM
1993–94	HC Škoda Plzeň	ELH	7	0	0	0	2	—	—	—	—	—
1994–95	HC Interconnex Plzeň	CZE U20	25	18	19	37	30	—	—	—	—	—
1994–95	HC Tábor	CZE-2	11	6	7	13	—	—	—	—	—	—
1995–96	Tri-City Americans	WHL	70	58	43	101	118	11	10	9	19	8
1996–97	Portland Pirates	AHL	54	38	28	66	56	5	2	0	2	6
1996–97	Washington Capitals	NHL	19	7	3	10	4	—	—	—	—	—
1997–98	Portland Pirates	AHL	16	12	7	19	16	7	1	2	3	2
1997–98	Washington Capitals	NHL	17	4	1	5	10	1	0	0	0	2
1998–99	Washington Capitals	NHL	25	6	8	14	12	—	—	—	—	—
1999–00	Washington Capitals	NHL	23	1	2	3	2	—	—	—	—	—
1999–00	Tampa Bay Lightning	NHL	29	5	5	10	28	—	—	—	—	—
2000–01	Detroit Vipers	IHL	2	2	2	4	2	—	—	—	—	—
NHL totals			113	23	19	42	56	1	0	0	0	2

== Awards ==
- WHL West Second All-Star Team – 1995-96 season
- Dudley "Red" Garrett Memorial Award (most outstanding rookie in AHL): 1996–97 season

Preceded by Alexandre Volchkov	Washington Capitals first-round draft pick 1996	Succeeded by Nick Boynton
Preceded by Darcy Tucker	Winner of the Dudley "Red" Garrett Memorial Award; 1996–97	Succeeded by Danny Brière
