= Reggie Savage =

Canadian ice hockey player (1970–2023)

- Born: May 1, 1970 Montreal, Quebec, Canada
- Died: December 24, 2023 (aged 53) Florida, U.S.
- Height: 5 ft 10 in (178 cm)
- Weight: 187 lb (85 kg; 13 st 5 lb)
- Position: Right Wing
- Shot: Left
- Played for: Washington Capitals; Quebec Nordiques
- NHL draft: 15th overall, 1988; Washington Capitals
- Playing career: 1990–2004

Réginald David Savage (May 1, 1970 – December 24, 2023) was a Canadian professional ice hockey player.

== Biography ==
As a youth, Savage played in the 1982 Quebec International Pee-Wee Hockey Tournament with a minor ice hockey team from Saint-Hubert, Quebec.

Savage represented Canada at the 1989 World Junior Ice Hockey Championships. Drafted in 1988 by the Capitals, Savage also later played for the Quebec Nordiques.

Savage is notable as one of only five NHL players to score his first career goal on a penalty shot.

After retiring from hockey, Savage worked in California for Marriott Hotels & Resorts in security.

== Personal life and death ==
Born in Canada, Savage was of Jamaican descent.

Savage died on December 24, 2023, at the age of 53 from cancer.

== Career statistics ==
=== Regular season and playoffs ===
			Regular season					Playoffs
Season	Team	League	GP	G	A	Pts	PIM	GP	G	A	Pts	PIM
1985–86	Richelieu Riverains	QMAAA	40	38	26	64		7	10	1	11
1986–87	Richelieu Riverains	QMAAA	42	82	57	139	44	9	10	9	19	10
1987–88	Victoriaville Tigres	QMJHL	68	68	54	122	77	5	2	3	5	8
1988–89	Victoriaville Tigres	QMJHL	54	58	55	113	178	16	15	13	28	52
1989–90	Victoriaville Tigres	QMJHL	63	51	43	94	79	16	13	10	23	40
1990–91	Washington Capitals	NHL	1	0	0	0	0	—	—	—	—	—
1990–91	Baltimore Skipjacks	AHL	63	32	29	61	10	6	1	1	2	6
1991–92	Baltimore Skipjacks	AHL	77	42	28	70	51	—	—	—	—	—
1992–93	Washington Capitals	NHL	16	2	3	5	12	—	—	—	—	—
1992–93	Baltimore Skipjacks	AHL	40	37	18	55	28	—	—	—	—	—
1993–94	Quebec Nordiques	NHL	17	3	4	7	16	—	—	—	—	—
1993–94	Cornwall Aces	AHL	33	21	13	34	56	—	—	—	—	—
1994–95	Cornwall Aces	AHL	34	13	7	20	56	14	5	6	11	40
1995–96	Atlanta Knights	IHL	66	22	14	36	118	—	—	—	—	—
1995–96	Syracuse Crunch	AHL	10	9	5	14	28	16	9	6	15	54
1996–97	Springfield Falcons	AHL	68	32	25	57	103	17	6	7	13	24
1997–98	Kansas City Blades	IHL	51	6	10	16	60	—	—	—	—	—
1997–98	San Antonio Dragons	IHL	22	6	12	18	24	—	—	—	—	—
1997–98	Orlando Solar Bears	IHL	10	5	5	10	18	17	2	9	11	60
1998–99	HC Asiago	AL	27	25	27	52	69	—	—	—	—	—
1998–99	HC Asiago	ITA	16	18	15	33	8	2	1	0	1	22
1999–2000	Syracuse Crunch	AHL	78	36	34	70	135	4	0	0	0	8
2000–01	Syracuse Crunch	AHL	78	37	24	61	90	5	0	2	2	16
2001–02	EHC Biel-Bienne	CHE.2	20	11	8	19	14	—	—	—	—	—
2001–02	EHC Visp	CHE.2	11	6	3	9	8	—	—	—	—	—
2002–03	HC Asiago	ITA	24	8	19	27	30	—	—	—	—	—
2003–04	Milwaukee Admirals	AHL	1	0	0	0	0	—	—	—	—	—
2003–04	Rockford IceHogs	UHL	24	3	7	10	31	—	—	—	—	—
2004–05	Toledo Storm	ECHL	17	2	1	3	8	—	—	—	—	—
NHL totals			34	5	7	12	28	—	—	—	—	—
AHL totals			481	259	183	442	557	62	21	22	43	148
IHL totals			149	39	41	80	220	17	2	9	11	60

=== International ===
Year	Team	Event	GP	G	A	Pts	PIM
1989	Canada	WJC	7	4	5	9	4

Preceded by Jeff Greenlaw	Washington Capitals first-round draft pick 1988	Succeeded by Olaf Kölzig
