= Joe Finley =

American ice hockey player (born 1987)

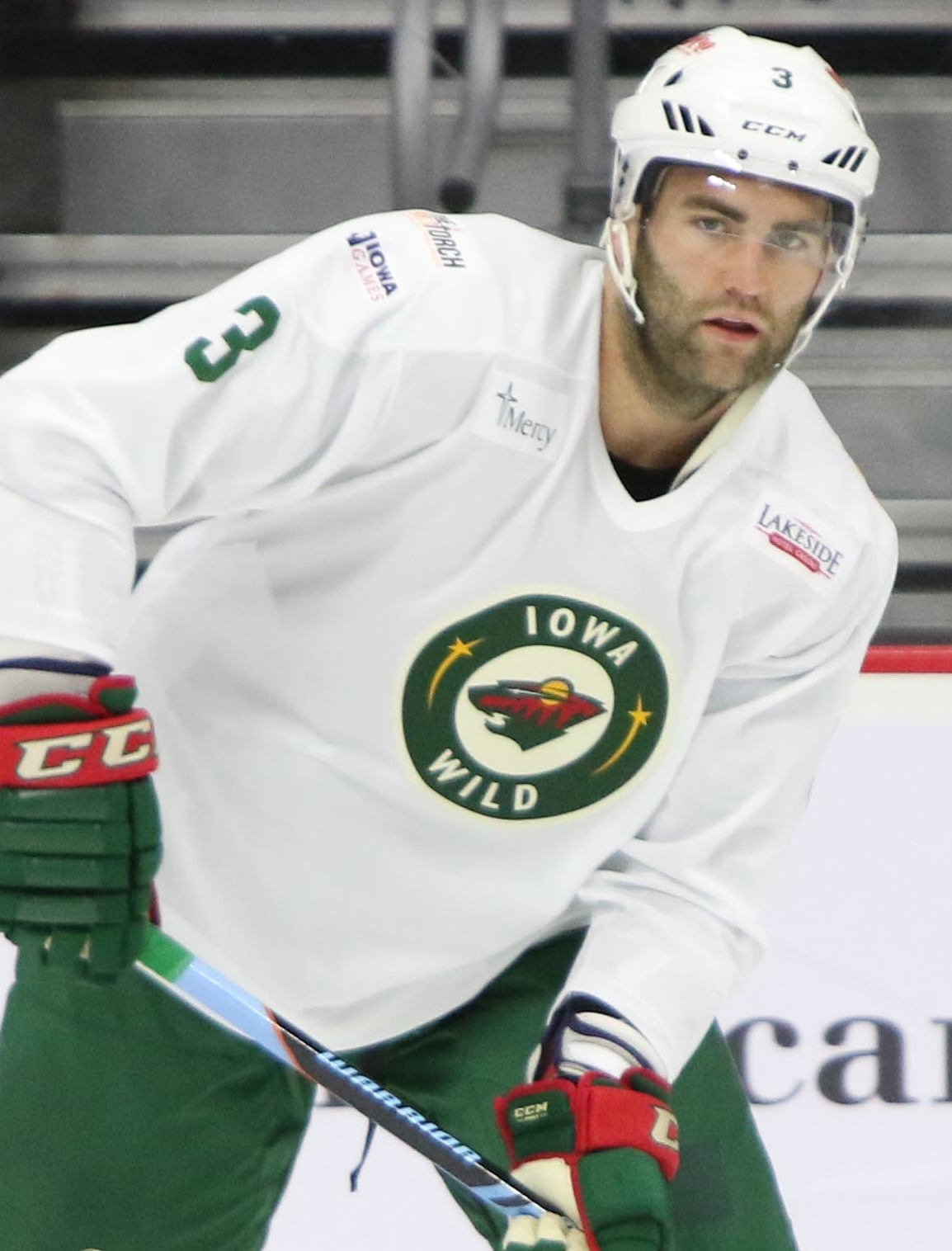
- Finley with the Iowa Wild in 2015
- Born: June 29, 1987 (age 39) Edina, Minnesota, U.S.
- Height: 6 ft 7 in (201 cm)
- Weight: 262 lb (119 kg; 18 st 10 lb)
- Position: Defense
- Shot: Left
- Played for: Buffalo Sabres; New York Islanders; Montreal Canadiens; HIFK
- NHL draft: 27th overall, 2005; Washington Capitals
- Playing career: 2009–2018

Joseph Scott Finley (born June 29, 1987) is an American former professional ice hockey defenseman. He played twenty-one games in the National Hockey League (NHL) with the Buffalo Sabres and New York Islanders between 2011 and 2013. The rest of his career, which lasted from 2009 to 2018, was spent in the minor leagues and ended with three seasons with HIFK in the Finnish Liiga. Finley was selected by the Washington Capitals 27th overall in the 2005 NHL entry draft.

== Playing career ==
Finley played for the Edina Peewee A state championship team in 1999–2000. Finley was a standout playing Minnesota High School hockey for the Edina Hornets. Due to Finley's strong play and leadership his freshman year, he made the White line the following year. In 2005, he said that making the White Line may well have been the greatest accomplishment of his hockey career. Finley missed the majority of the 2009–10 season on injured reserve when on November 21, 2009, in a game with the Stingrays against the Gwinnett Gladiators, he ruptured an artery in his hand which required surgery.

On September 18, 2011, Finley accepted an invitation to training camp by the Buffalo Sabres. He impressed enough that he was signed to an AHL contract, and assigned to the Rochester Americans. Through the first quarter of the season, Finley was impressive as one half of the Americans shut-down defensive pairing. He led the Amerks in +/- with a +10. The Sabres and Finley reached a three-year contract on November 28, 2011, that will allow Finley to be called up by Sabres organization.

Two days after the deal was completed, Finley was called up by the Sabres where he made his NHL debut against the Red Wings on December 2, 2011. Finley was the 475th player to play in the NHL after starting his career in the ECHL.

Prior to the lockout shortened 2012–13 NHL season, Finley was claimed off waivers from the Sabres by the New York Islanders on January 14, 2013.

On July 29, 2014, Finley signed as a free agent to a one-year AHL contract with the Hamilton Bulldogs. In the 2014–15 season, Finley appeared in 54 games with the Bulldogs, contributing with 3 assists and 132 penalty minutes.

On October 8, 2015, Finley continued in the AHL, signing a one-year AHL deal with the Iowa Wild, an affiliate to the Minnesota Wild. In the 2015–16 season, Finley appeared in 56 games with Iowa, recording a professional high of 5 goals from the blueline.

On June 21, 2016, Finley opted to pursue a career abroad, agreeing to a one-year deal with Finnish club, HIFK, of the Liiga. Before Finley had arrived to Helsinki in 2016 he already got a nickname, "The Red #3" after Lalli Partinen, a former defenseman who played for HIFK in 1969–1977.

On February 3, 2017, HIFK announced a two-year contract extension with Finley.

== Career statistics ==
			Regular season					Playoffs
Season	Team	League	GP	G	A	Pts	PIM	GP	G	A	Pts	PIM
2003–04	Edina High School	HS-MN	—	—	—	—	—	—	—	—	—	—
2004–05	Sioux Falls Stampede	USHL	55	3	10	13	181	—	—	—	—	—
2005–06	University of North Dakota	WCHA	43	0	3	3	96	—	—	—	—	—
2006–07	University of North Dakota	WCHA	41	1	6	7	72	—	—	—	—	—
2007–08	University of North Dakota	WCHA	43	4	11	15	79	—	—	—	—	—
2008–09	University of North Dakota	WCHA	27	2	8	10	56	—	—	—	—	—
2008–09	Hershey Bears	AHL	1	0	0	0	7	—	—	—	—	—
2009–10	South Carolina Stingrays	ECHL	17	1	3	4	43	—	—	—	—	—
2010–11	South Carolina Stingrays	ECHL	26	1	7	8	73	4	0	0	0	10
2010–11	Hershey Bears	AHL	7	0	1	1	15	—	—	—	—	—
2011–12	Rochester Americans	AHL	57	1	5	6	143	3	0	0	0	0
2011–12	Buffalo Sabres	NHL	5	0	0	0	12	—	—	—	—	—
2012–13	Rochester Americans	AHL	36	1	4	5	81	—	—	—	—	—
2012–13	New York Islanders	NHL	16	0	1	1	20	—	—	—	—	—
2013–14	Bridgeport Sound Tigers	AHL	29	0	2	2	50	—	—	—	—	—
2014–15	Hamilton Bulldogs	AHL	54	0	3	3	132	—	—	—	—	—
2015–16	Iowa Wild	AHL	56	5	1	6	92	—	—	—	—	—
2016–17	HIFK	Liiga	46	3	5	8	142	14	0	2	2	55
2017–18	HIFK	Liiga	9	0	0	0	6	1	0	0	0	25
2018–19	HIFK	Liiga	19	0	0	0	30	—	—	—	—	—
NHL totals			21	0	1	1	32	—	—	—	—	—
Liiga totals			74	3	5	8	178	15	0	2	2	80

Awards and achievements
Preceded by Sasha Pokulok	Washington Capitals first-round draft pick 2005	Succeeded by Nicklas Bäckström
