= Kent Hulst =

Canadian ice hockey player (born 1968)

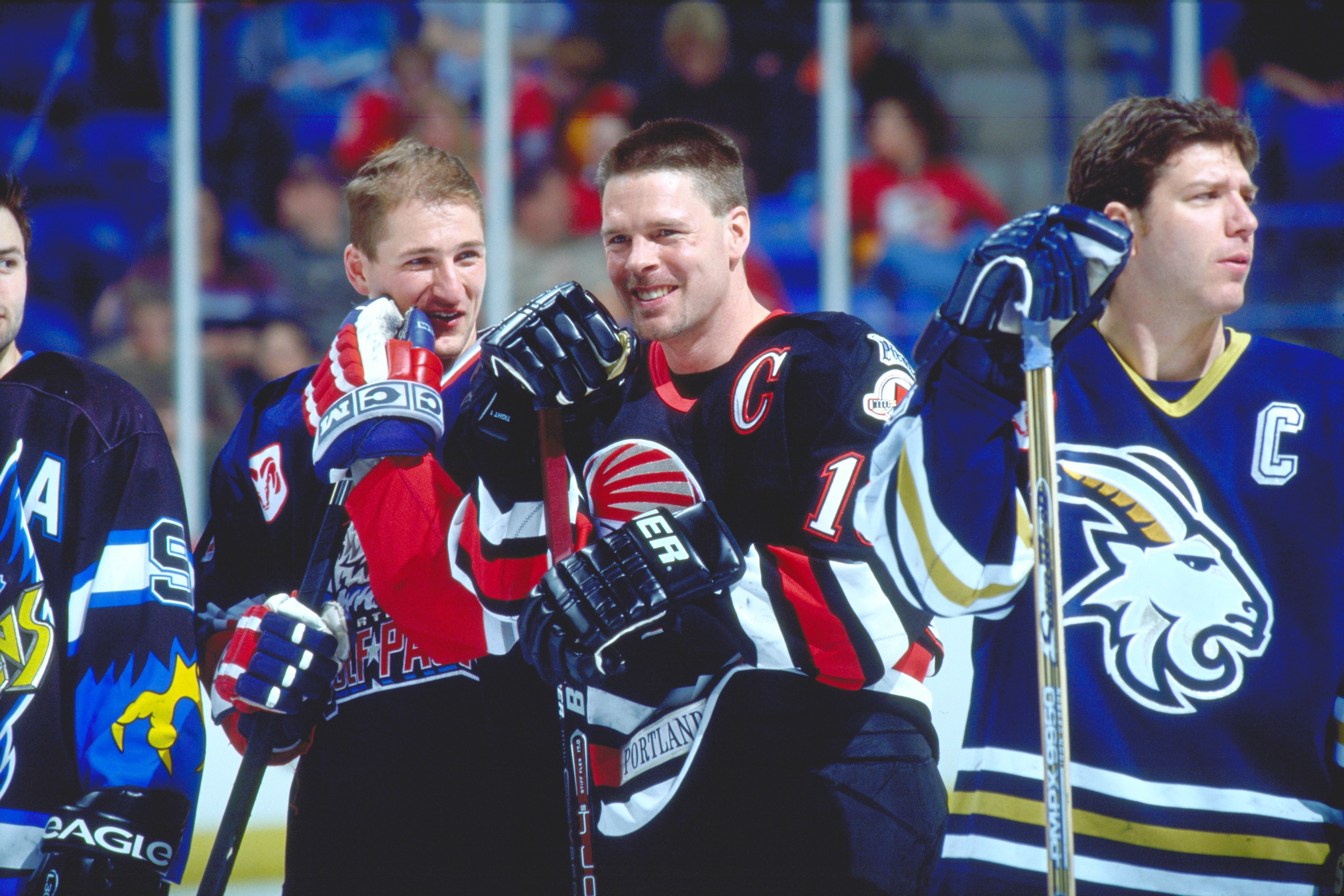
- Born: April 8, 1968 (age 58) St. Thomas, Ontario, Canada
- Height: 6 ft 1 in (185 cm)
- Weight: 195 lb (88 kg; 13 st 13 lb)
- Position: Centre
- Shot: Left
- Played for: Flint Spirits; Newmarket Saints; New Haven Nighthawks; Portland Pirates; Providence Bruins
- NHL draft: 69th overall, 1986; Toronto Maple Leafs
- Playing career: 1989–2001

Kent Hulst (born April 8, 1968) is a Canadian former professional ice hockey player. He was selected by the Toronto Maple Leafs in the fourth round, 69th overall, of the 1986 NHL entry draft.

Hulst most notably played with the Portland Pirates from the team's inaugural season in Portland, Maine, claiming the Calder Cup, in 1993 until leaving the team in his final professional season for the post-season with the Providence Bruins in 2001–02.

In 2002, Hulst was inducted into the Portland Pirates Hall of Fame.

== Career statistics ==
			Regular season					Playoffs
Season	Team	League	GP	G	A	Pts	PIM	GP	G	A	Pts	PIM
1985–86	Belleville Bulls	OHL	43	6	17	23	20	—	—	—	—	—
1985–96	Windsor Compuware Spitfires	OHL	17	6	10	16	9	16	5	8	13	13
1986–87	Windsor Compuware Spitfires	OHL	37	18	20	38	49	—	—	—	—	—
1986–87	Belleville Bulls	OHL	27	13	10	23	17	6	1	1	2	0
1987–88	Belleville Bulls	OHL	66	42	43	85	48	6	3	1	4	7
1988–89	Belleville Bulls	OHL	45	21	41	62	43	5	1	3	4	4
1988–89	Flint Spirits	IHL	7	0	1	1	4	—	—	—	—	—
1998–89	Newmarket Saints	AHL	—	—	—	—	—	2	1	1	2	2
1989–90	Newmarket Saints	AHL	80	26	34	60	29	—	—	—	—	—
1990–91	Newmarket Saints	AHL	79	28	37	65	57	—	—	—	—	—
1991–92	New Haven Nighthawks	AHL	80	21	39	60	59	5	2	2	4	0
1992–93	SC Lyss	NLB	27	7	11	18	49	—	—	—	—	—
1993–94	Portland Pirates	AHL	72	34	33	67	68	17	4	6	10	14
1994–95	Portland Pirates	AHL	29	10	17	27	80	7	3	1	4	2
1995–96	Portland Pirates	AHL	75	25	47	72	122	24	11	16	27	30
1996–97	Portland Pirates	AHL	48	19	31	50	60	5	1	2	3	4
1997–98	Portland Pirates	AHL	77	24	23	47	74	10	3	4	7	6
1998–99	Portland Pirates	AHL	72	16	23	39	52	—	—	—	—	—
1999–00	Portland Pirates	AHL	53	13	26	39	24	4	0	0	0	0
2000–01	Portland Pirates	AHL	47	6	13	19	36	—	—	—	—	—
2000–01	Providence Bruins	AHL	23	4	12	16	16	10	1	1	2	4
AHL totals			735	226	335	561	677	84	26	33	59	62

== Awards and honours ==
Award	Year
AHL
Calder Cup (Portland Pirates)	1994
All-Star Game	2001
Fred T. Hunt Memorial Award	2001
