= List of Washington Capitals draft picks =

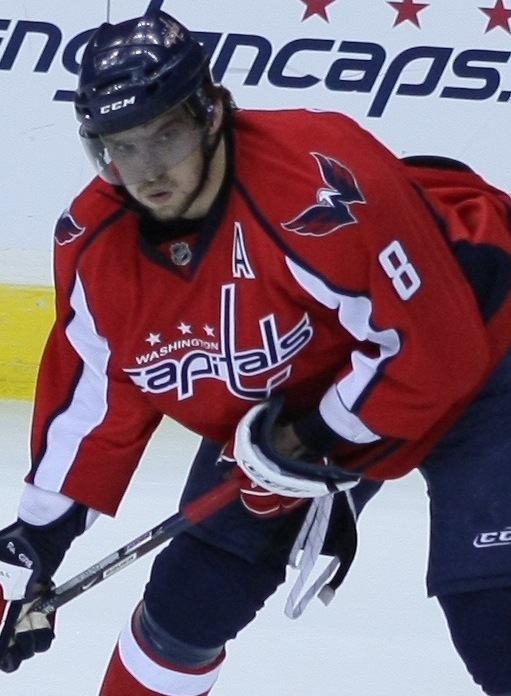
The Capitals selected Alexander Ovechkin 1st overall in the 2004 NHL entry draft.

This is a complete list of ice hockey players who were drafted in the National Hockey League Entry Draft by the Washington Capitals franchise. It includes every player who was drafted, regardless of whether he played for the team.

== Key ==
Played at least one game with the Capitals
Spent entire NHL career with the Capitals

General terms and abbreviations
Term or abbreviation	Definition
Draft	The year that the player was selected
Round	The round of the draft in which the player was selected
Pick	The overall position in the draft at which the player was selected
S	Supplemental draft selection

Position abbreviations
Abbreviation	Definition
G	Goaltender
D	Defense
LW	Left wing
C	Center
RW	Right wing
F	Forward

Abbreviations for statistical columns
Abbreviation	Definition
Pos	Position
GP	Games played
G	Goals
A	Assists
Pts	Points
PIM	Penalties in minutes
W	Wins
L	Losses
T	Ties
OT	Overtime/shootout losses
GAA	Goals against average
—	Does not apply

== Draft picks ==
Statistics are complete as of the 2025–26 NHL season and show each player's career regular season totals in the NHL. Wins, losses, ties, overtime losses and goals against average apply to goaltenders and are used only for players at that position.

Draft	Round	Pick	Player	Nationality	Pos	GP	G	A	Pts	PIM	W	L	T	OT	GAA
1974	1	1	Greg Joly	Canada	D	365	21	76	97	250	—	—	—	—	—
1974	2	19	Mike Marson	Canada	F	196	24	24	48	233	—	—	—	—	—
1974	3	37	John Paddock	Canada	F	87	8	14	22	86	—	—	—	—	—
1974	4	55	Paul Nicholson	Canada	LW	62	4	8	12	18	—	—	—	—	—
1974	5	73	Jack Patterson	Canada	F	—	—	—	—	—	—	—	—	—	—
1974	6	91	Brian Kinsella	Canada	RW	10	0	1	1	0	—	—	—	—	—
1974	7	109	Garth Malarchuk	Canada	G	—	—	—	—	—	—	—	—	—	—
1974	8	127	John Nazar	Canada	LW	—	—	—	—	—	—	—	—	—	—
1974	9	144	Kelvin Erickson	Canada	G	—	—	—	—	—	—	—	—	—	—
1974	10	161	Tony White	Canada	F	164	37	28	65	104	—	—	—	—	—
1974	11	176	Ron Pronchuk	Canada	D	—	—	—	—	—	—	—	—	—	—
1974	12	190	Dave McKee	Canada	RW	—	—	—	—	—	—	—	—	—	—
1974	13	202	Scott Mabley	Canada	D	—	—	—	—	—	—	—	—	—	—
1974	14	212	Bernard Plante	Canada	LW	—	—	—	—	—	—	—	—	—	—
1974	15	220	Jacques Chiasson	Canada	RW	—	—	—	—	—	—	—	—	—	—
1974	16	225	Bill Bell	Canada	D	—	—	—	—	—	—	—	—	—	—
1974	17	228	Bob Blanchet	Canada	G	—	—	—	—	—	—	—	—	—	—
1974	18	231	Johnny Bower	Canada	D	—	—	—	—	—	—	—	—	—	—
1974	19	234	Yves Plouffe	Canada	D	—	—	—	—	—	—	—	—	—	—
1974	20	237	Terry Bozack	Canada	D	—	—	—	—	—	—	—	—	—	—
1974	21	240	Gordie Cole	Canada	LW	—	—	—	—	—	—	—	—	—	—
1974	22	242	Mike Consentino	Canada	C	—	—	—	—	—	—	—	—	—	—
1974	23	244	John Duncan	Canada	D	—	—	—	—	—	—	—	—	—	—
1974	24	246	Barry Kerfoot	Canada	RW	—	—	—	—	—	—	—	—	—	—
1974	25	247	Ron Poole	Canada	C	—	—	—	—	—	—	—	—	—	—
1975	1	18	Alex Forsyth	Canada	F	1	0	0	0	0	—	—	—	—	—
1975	2	19	Peter Scamurra	Canada	D	132	8	25	33	59	—	—	—	—	—
1975	4	55	Blair MacKasey	Canada	D	1	0	0	0	2	—	—	—	—	—
1975	5	73	Craig Crawford	Canada	C	—	—	—	—	—	—	—	—	—	—
1975	6	91	Roger Swanson	Canada	G	—	—	—	—	—	—	—	—	—	—
1975	7	109	Clark Jantzie	Canada	F	—	—	—	—	—	—	—	—	—	—
1975	8	127	Mike Fryia	Canada	F	—	—	—	—	—	—	—	—	—	—
1975	9	144	Jim Ofrim	Canada	C	—	—	—	—	—	—	—	—	—	—
1975	10	161	Mal Zinger	Canada	F	—	—	—	—	—	—	—	—	—	—
1976	1	1	Rick Green	Canada	D	845	43	220	263	588	—	—	—	—	—
1976	1	15	Greg Carroll	Canada	RW	131	20	34	54	44	—	—	—	—	—
1976	3	37	Tom Rowe	United States	RW	357	85	100	185	615	—	—	—	—	—
1976	4	55	Al Glendinning	Canada	D	—	—	—	—	—	—	—	—	—	—
1976	5	73	Doug Patey	Canada	RW	45	4	2	6	8	—	—	—	—	—
1976	6	91	Jim Bedard	Canada	G	73	0	2	2	10	17	40	13	—	3.94
1976	6	100	Don Wilson	Canada	D	—	—	—	—	—	—	—	—	—	—
1976	7	109	Dale Rideout	Canada	G	—	—	—	—	—	—	—	—	—	—
1976	8	119	Al Dumba	Canada	RW	—	—	—	—	—	—	—	—	—	—
1977	1	3	Robert Picard	Canada	D	899	104	319	423	1025	—	—	—	—	—
1977	2	21	Mark Lofthouse	Canada	RW	181	42	38	80	73	—	—	—	—	—
1977	3	39	Eddy Godin	Canada	RW	27	3	6	9	12	—	—	—	—	—
1977	4	57	Nelson Burton	Canada	LW	8	1	0	1	21	—	—	—	—	—
1977	5	75	Denis Turcotte	Canada	C	—	—	—	—	—	—	—	—	—	—
1977	6	93	Perry Schnarr	Canada	LW	—	—	—	—	—	—	—	—	—	—
1977	7	111	Rollie Boutin	Canada	G	22	0	1	1	6	7	10	1	—	3.96
1977	8	127	Brent Tremblay	Canada	D	10	1	0	1	6	—	—	—	—	—
1977	9	143	Don Micheletti	United States	W	—	—	—	—	—	—	—	—	—	—
1977	10	156	Archie Henderson	Canada	RW	23	3	1	4	92	—	—	—	—	—
1978	1	2	Ryan Walter	Canada	C	1003	264	382	646	946	—	—	—	—	—
1978	1	18	Tim Coulis	Canada	F	47	4	5	9	138	—	—	—	—	—
1978	2	20	Paul Mulvey	Canada	LW	225	30	51	81	613	—	—	—	—	—
1978	2	23	Paul MacKinnon	Canada	D	147	5	23	28	91	—	—	—	—	—
1978	3	38	Glen Currie	Canada	LW	326	39	79	118	100	—	—	—	—	—
1978	3	45	Jay Johnston	Canada	D	8	0	0	0	13	—	—	—	—	—
1978	4	55	Bengt-Ake Gustafsson	Sweden	F	629	196	359	555	196	—	—	—	—	—
1978	5	71	Lou Franceschetti	Canada	RW	459	59	81	140	747	—	—	—	—	—
1978	6	88	Vince Magnan	Canada	LW	—	—	—	—	—	—	—	—	—	—
1978	7	105	Mats Hallin	Sweden	LW	152	17	14	31	193	—	—	—	—	—
1978	8	122	Rich Sirois	Canada	G	—	—	—	—	—	—	—	—	—	—
1978	9	139	Denis Pomerleau	Canada	RW	—	—	—	—	—	—	—	—	—	—
1978	10	156	Barry Heard	Canada	G	—	—	—	—	—	—	—	—	—	—
1978	11	172	Mark Toffolo	United States	D	—	—	—	—	—	—	—	—	—	—
1978	12	187	Paul Hogan	Canada	LW	—	—	—	—	—	—	—	—	—	—
1978	12	189	Steve Barger	United States	RW	—	—	—	—	—	—	—	—	—	—
1978	13	202	Rod Pacholzuk	Canada	D	—	—	—	—	—	—	—	—	—	—
1978	14	213	Wes Jarvis	Canada	F	237	31	55	86	98	—	—	—	—	—
1978	14	215	Ray Irwin	Canada	D	—	—	—	—	—	—	—	—	—	—
1979	1	4	Mike Gartner	Canada	RW	1432	708	627	1335	1159	—	—	—	—	—
1979	2	24	Errol Rausse	Canada	LW	31	7	3	10	0	—	—	—	—	—
1979	4	67	Harvie Pocza	Canada	LW	3	0	0	0	2	—	—	—	—	—
1979	5	88	Tim Tookey	Canada	C	106	22	36	58	71	—	—	—	—	—
1979	6	109	Greg Theberge	Canada	D	153	15	63	78	73	—	—	—	—	—
1980	1	5	Darren Veitch	Canada	D	511	48	209	257	296	—	—	—	—	—
1980	3	47	Dan Miele	Canada	RW	—	—	—	—	—	—	—	—	—	—
1980	3	55	Torrie Robertson	Canada	LW	442	49	99	148	1751	—	—	—	—	—
1980	5	89	Timo Blomqvist	Finland	D	243	4	53	57	293	—	—	—	—	—
1980	6	110	Todd Bidner	United Kingdom	C	12	2	1	3	7	—	—	—	—	—
1980	7	131	Frank Perkins	United States	D	—	—	—	—	—	—	—	—	—	—
1980	8	152	Bruce Raboin	United States	D	—	—	—	—	—	—	—	—	—	—
1980	9	173	Peter Andersson	Sweden	D	172	10	41	51	81	—	—	—	—	—
1980	10	194	Tony Camazzola	Canada	D	3	0	0	0	4	—	—	—	—	—
1981	1	3	Bobby Carpenter	United States	C	1178	320	408	728	919	—	—	—	—	—
1981	3	45	Eric Calder	Canada	D	2	0	0	0	0	—	—	—	—	—
1981	4	68	Tony Kellin	United States	D	—	—	—	—	—	—	—	—	—	—
1981	5	89	Mike Siltala	Canada	RW	7	1	0	1	2	—	—	—	—	—
1981	5	91	Peter Sidorkiewicz	Canada	G	246	0	9	9	20	79	128	27	—	3.60
1981	6	110	Jim McGeough	Canada	C	57	7	10	17	32	—	—	—	—	—
1981	7	131	Risto Jalo	Finland	F	3	0	3	3	0	—	—	—	—	—
1981	8	152	Gaetan Duchesne	Canada	LW	1028	179	254	433	617	—	—	—	—	—
1981	9	173	George White	United States	F	—	—	—	—	—	—	—	—	—	—
1981	10	194	Chris Valentine	Canada	F	105	43	52	95	127	—	—	—	—	—
1982	1	5	Scott Stevens	Canada	D	1635	196	712	908	2785	—	—	—	—	—
1982	3	58	Milan Novy	Czech Republic	F	73	18	30	48	16	—	—	—	—	—
1982	5	89	Dean Evason	Canada	C	803	139	233	372	1002	—	—	—	—	—
1982	6	110	Ed Kastelic	Canada	RW	220	11	10	21	719	—	—	—	—	—
1982	8	152	Wally Schreiber	Canada	F	41	8	10	18	12	—	—	—	—	—
1982	9	173	Jamie Reeve	Canada	G	—	—	—	—	—	—	—	—	—	—
1982	10	194	Juha Nurmi	Finland	C	—	—	—	—	—	—	—	—	—	—
1982	11	215	Wayne Prestage	Canada	C	—	—	—	—	—	—	—	—	—	—
1982	12	236	Jon Holden	Canada	G	—	—	—	—	—	—	—	—	—	—
1982	12	247	Marco Kallas	Canada	C	—	—	—	—	—	—	—	—	—	—
1983	4	75	Tim Bergland	United States	RW	182	17	26	43	75	—	—	—	—	—
1983	5	95	Martin Bouliane	Canada	C	—	—	—	—	—	—	—	—	—	—
1983	7	135	Dwaine Hutton	Canada	C	—	—	—	—	—	—	—	—	—	—
1983	8	155	Marty Abrams	Canada	G	—	—	—	—	—	—	—	—	—	—
1983	9	175	Dave Cowan	United States	LW	—	—	—	—	—	—	—	—	—	—
1983	10	195	Yves Beaudoin	Canada	D	11	0	0	0	5	—	—	—	—	—
1983	11	215	Alain Raymond	Canada	G	1	0	0	0	0	0	1	0	—	3.00
1983	11	216	Anders Huss	Sweden	F	—	—	—	—	—	—	—	—	—	—
1984	1	17	Kevin Hatcher	United States	D	1157	227	450	677	1392	—	—	—	—	—
1984	2	34	Stephen Leach	United States	RW	702	130	153	283	978	—	—	—	—	—
1984	3	59	Michal Pivonka	Czech Republic	C	825	181	418	599	478	—	—	—	—	—
1984	4	80	Kris King	Canada	LW	849	66	85	151	2030	—	—	—	—	—
1984	6	122	Vito Cramarossa	Canada	RW	—	—	—	—	—	—	—	—	—	—
1984	7	143	Timo Iljina	Finland	C	—	—	—	—	—	—	—	—	—	—
1984	8	164	Frank Joo	Canada	D	—	—	—	—	—	—	—	—	—	—
1984	9	185	Jim Thomson	Canada	RW	115	4	3	7	416	—	—	—	—	—
1984	10	205	Paul Cavallini	Canada	D	564	56	177	233	750	—	—	—	—	—
1984	11	225	Mikhail Tatarinov	Russia	D	161	21	48	69	184	—	—	—	—	—
1984	12	246	Per Schederin	Sweden	D	—	—	—	—	—	—	—	—	—	—
1985	1	19	Yvon Corriveau	Canada	LW	280	48	40	88	310	—	—	—	—	—
1985	2	40	John Druce	Canada	RW	531	113	126	239	347	—	—	—	—	—
1985	3	61	Rob Murray	Canada	C	107	4	15	19	111	—	—	—	—	—
1985	4	82	Bill Houlder	Canada	D	846	59	191	250	412	—	—	—	—	—
1985	4	83	Larry Shaw	Canada	D	—	—	—	—	—	—	—	—	—	—
1985	5	103	Claude Dumas	Canada	C	—	—	—	—	—	—	—	—	—	—
1985	6	124	Doug Stromback	United States	RW	—	—	—	—	—	—	—	—	—	—
1985	7	145	Jamie Nadjiwan	Canada	LW	—	—	—	—	—	—	—	—	—	—
1985	8	166	Mark Haarmann	Canada	D	—	—	—	—	—	—	—	—	—	—
1985	9	187	Steve Hollett	Canada	LW	—	—	—	—	—	—	—	—	—	—
1985	10	208	Dallas Eakins	United States	D	120	0	9	9	208	—	—	—	—	—
1985	11	229	Steve Hrynewich	Canada	C	—	—	—	—	—	—	—	—	—	—
1985	12	250	Frank Di Muzio	Italy	LW	—	—	—	—	—	—	—	—	—	—
1986	1	19	Jeff Greenlaw	Canada	LW	57	3	6	9	108	—	—	—	—	—
1986	2	40	Steve Seftel	Canada	LW	4	0	0	0	2	—	—	—	—	—
1986	3	60	Shawn Simpson	Canada	G	—	—	—	—	—	—	—	—	—	—
1986	3	61	Jim Hrivnak	Canada	G	85	0	5	5	2	34	30	3	—	3.73
1986	4	82	Erin Ginnell	Canada	C	—	—	—	—	—	—	—	—	—	—
1986	5	103	John Purves	Canada	RW	7	1	0	1	0	—	—	—	—	—
1986	6	124	Stefan Nilsson	Sweden	C	—	—	—	—	—	—	—	—	—	—
1986	7	145	Peter Choma	Canada	RW	—	—	—	—	—	—	—	—	—	—
1986	8	166	Lee Davidson	Canada	C	—	—	—	—	—	—	—	—	—	—
1986	9	187	Tero Toivola	Finland	RW	—	—	—	—	—	—	—	—	—	—
1986	10	208	Bob Babcock	Canada	D	2	0	0	0	2	—	—	—	—	—
1986	11	229	John Schratz	Canada	D	—	—	—	—	—	—	—	—	—	—
1986	12	250	Scott McCrory	Canada	C	—	—	—	—	—	—	—	—	—	—
1986	S	22	Steve Cousins	Canada	D	—	—	—	—	—	—	—	—	—	—
1987	2	36	Jeff Ballantyne	Canada	D	—	—	—	—	—	—	—	—	—	—
1987	3	57	Steve Maltais	Canada	W	120	9	18	27	53	—	—	—	—	—
1987	4	78	Tyler Larter	Canada	C	1	0	0	0	0	—	—	—	—	—
1987	5	99	Pat Beauchesne	Canada	D	—	—	—	—	—	—	—	—	—	—
1987	6	120	Rich DeFreitas	United States	D	—	—	—	—	—	—	—	—	—	—
1987	7	141	Devon Oleniuk	Canada	D	—	—	—	—	—	—	—	—	—	—
1987	8	162	Thomas Sjogren	Sweden	RW	—	—	—	—	—	—	—	—	—	—
1987	10	204	Chris Clarke	Canada	D	—	—	—	—	—	—	—	—	—	—
1987	11	225	Milos Vanik	Germany	C	—	—	—	—	—	—	—	—	—	—
1987	12	240	Dan Brettschneider	United States	C	—	—	—	—	—	—	—	—	—	—
1987	12	246	Ryan Kummu	Canada	D	—	—	—	—	—	—	—	—	—	—
1987	S	16	Mark Anderson	United States	LW	—	—	—	—	—	—	—	—	—	—
1988	1	15	Reggie Savage	Canada	RW	34	5	7	12	28	—	—	—	—	—
1988	2	36	Tim Taylor	Canada	C	746	73	94	167	433	—	—	—	—	—
1988	2	41	Wade Bartley	Canada	D	—	—	—	—	—	—	—	—	—	—
1988	3	57	Duane Derksen	Canada	G	—	—	—	—	—	—	—	—	—	—
1988	4	78	Rob Krauss	Canada	D	—	—	—	—	—	—	—	—	—	—
1988	6	120	Dmitri Khristich	Ukraine	RW	811	259	337	596	422	—	—	—	—	—
1988	7	141	Keith Jones	Canada	RW	491	117	141	258	765	—	—	—	—	—
1988	7	144	Brad Schlegel	Canada	D	48	1	8	9	10	—	—	—	—	—
1988	8	162	Todd Hilditch	Canada	D	—	—	—	—	—	—	—	—	—	—
1988	9	183	Petr Pavlas	Czech Republic	D	—	—	—	—	—	—	—	—	—	—
1988	10	192	Mark Sorensen	Canada	D	—	—	—	—	—	—	—	—	—	—
1988	10	204	Claudio Scremin	Canada	D	17	0	1	1	29	—	—	—	—	—
1988	11	225	Chris Venkus	United States	W	—	—	—	—	—	—	—	—	—	—
1988	12	246	Ron Pascucci	United States	D	—	—	—	—	—	—	—	—	—	—
1988	S	20	Harry Mews	Canada	F	—	—	—	—	—	—	—	—	—	—
1989	1	19	Olaf Kolzig	Germany	G	719	0	17	17	107	303	297	63	24	2.71
1989	2	35	Byron Dafoe	Canada	G	415	0	8	8	68	171	170	56	—	2.69
1989	3	59	Jim Mathieson	Canada	D	2	0	0	0	4	—	—	—	—	—
1989	3	61	Jason Woolley	Canada	D	718	68	246	314	430	—	—	—	—	—
1989	4	82	Trent Klatt	United States	RW	782	143	200	343	307	—	—	—	—	—
1989	7	145	Dave Lorentz	Canada	LW	—	—	—	—	—	—	—	—	—	—
1989	8	166	Dean Holoien	Canada	RW	—	—	—	—	—	—	—	—	—	—
1989	9	187	Victor Gervais	Canada	C	—	—	—	—	—	—	—	—	—	—
1989	10	208	Jiri Vykoukal	Czech Republic	D	—	—	—	—	—	—	—	—	—	—
1989	11	229	Andrei Sidorov	Ukraine	LW	—	—	—	—	—	—	—	—	—	—
1989	12	250	Ken House	Canada	LW	—	—	—	—	—	—	—	—	—	—
1989	S	24	Karl Clauss	United States	D	—	—	—	—	—	—	—	—	—	—
1990	1	9	John Slaney	Canada	D	268	22	69	91	99	—	—	—	—	—
1990	2	30	Rod Pasma	Canada	D	—	—	—	—	—	—	—	—	—	—
1990	3	51	Chris Longo	Canada	RW	—	—	—	—	—	—	—	—	—	—
1990	4	72	Randy Pearce	Canada	LW	—	—	—	—	—	—	—	—	—	—
1990	5	93	Brian Sakic	Canada	C	—	—	—	—	—	—	—	—	—	—
1990	5	94	Mark Ouimet	Switzerland	C	—	—	—	—	—	—	—	—	—	—
1990	6	114	Andrei Kovalev	Belarus	RW	—	—	—	—	—	—	—	—	—	—
1990	7	135	Roman Kontsek	Slovakia	F	—	—	—	—	—	—	—	—	—	—
1990	8	156	Peter Bondra	Slovakia	RW	1081	503	389	892	761	—	—	—	—	—
1990	8	159	Steve Martell	Canada	RW	—	—	—	—	—	—	—	—	—	—
1990	9	177	Ken Klee	United States	D	934	55	140	195	880	—	—	—	—	—
1990	10	198	Mike Boback	United States	C	—	—	—	—	—	—	—	—	—	—
1990	11	219	Alan Brown	Canada	D	—	—	—	—	—	—	—	—	—	—
1990	12	240	Todd Hlushko	Canada	LW	79	8	13	21	84	—	—	—	—	—
1990	S	14	Martin Jiranek	Canada	C	—	—	—	—	—	—	—	—	—	—
1991	1	14	Pat Peake	United States	RW	134	28	41	69	105	—	—	—	—	—
1991	1	21	Trevor Halverson	Canada	LW	17	0	4	4	28	—	—	—	—	—
1991	2	25	Eric Lavigne	Canada	D	1	0	0	0	0	—	—	—	—	—
1991	2	36	Jeff Nelson	Canada	C	52	3	8	11	20	—	—	—	—	—
1991	3	58	Steve Konowalchuk	United States	LW	790	171	225	396	703	—	—	—	—	—
1991	4	80	Justin Morrison	Canada	RW	—	—	—	—	—	—	—	—	—	—
1991	7	146	Dave Morissette	Canada	LW	11	0	0	0	57	—	—	—	—	—
1991	8	168	Rick Corriveau	Canada	D	—	—	—	—	—	—	—	—	—	—
1991	9	190	Trevor Duhaime	Canada	RW	—	—	—	—	—	—	—	—	—	—
1991	10	209	Rob Leask	Germany	D	—	—	—	—	—	—	—	—	—	—
1991	10	212	Carl LeBlanc	Canada	D	—	—	—	—	—	—	—	—	—	—
1991	11	234	Rob Puchniak	Canada	D	—	—	—	—	—	—	—	—	—	—
1991	12	256	Bill Kovacs	Canada	LW	—	—	—	—	—	—	—	—	—	—
1991	S	20	Mike Brewer	Canada	F	—	—	—	—	—	—	—	—	—	—
1992	1	14	Sergei Gonchar	Russia	D	1301	220	591	811	981	—	—	—	—	—
1992	2	32	Jim Carey	United States	G	172	0	1	1	8	79	65	16	—	2.58
1992	3	53	Stefan Ustorf	Germany	C	54	7	10	17	16	—	—	—	—	—
1992	3	71	Martin Gendron	Canada	RW	30	4	2	6	10	—	—	—	—	—
1992	5	119	John Varga	United States	C	—	—	—	—	—	—	—	—	—	—
1992	7	167	Mark Matier	Canada	LW	—	—	—	—	—	—	—	—	—	—
1992	8	191	Mike Mathers	Canada	LW	—	—	—	—	—	—	—	—	—	—
1992	9	215	Brian Stagg	Canada	RW	—	—	—	—	—	—	—	—	—	—
1992	10	239	Greg Callahan	United States	D	—	—	—	—	—	—	—	—	—	—
1992	11	263	B. J. MacPherson	Canada	C	—	—	—	—	—	—	—	—	—	—
1993	1	11	Brendan Witt	Canada	C	890	25	96	121	1424	—	—	—	—	—
1993	1	17	Jason Allison	Canada	C	552	154	331	485	441	—	—	—	—	—
1993	3	69	Patrick Boileau	Canada	D	48	5	11	16	26	—	—	—	—	—
1993	6	147	Frank Banham	Canada	RW	32	9	2	11	16	—	—	—	—	—
1993	7	173	Dan Hendrickson	United States	C	—	—	—	—	—	—	—	—	—	—
1993	7	174	Andrew Brunette	Canada	LW	1110	268	465	733	314	—	—	—	—	—
1993	8	199	Joel Poirier	Canada	LW	—	—	—	—	—	—	—	—	—	—
1993	9	225	Jason Gladney	Canada	D	—	—	—	—	—	—	—	—	—	—
1993	10	251	Marc Seliger	Germany	G	—	—	—	—	—	—	—	—	—	—
1993	11	277	Dany Bousquet	Canada	C	—	—	—	—	—	—	—	—	—	—
1994	1	10	Nolan Baumgartner	Canada	D	143	7	40	47	69	—	—	—	—	—
1994	1	15	Alexander Kharlamov	Russia	RW	—	—	—	—	—	—	—	—	—	—
1994	2	41	Scott Cherrey	Canada	LW	—	—	—	—	—	—	—	—	—	—
1994	4	93	Matt Herr	United States	C	58	4	5	9	25	—	—	—	—	—
1994	5	119	Yanick Jean	Canada	D	—	—	—	—	—	—	—	—	—	—
1994	6	145	Dmitri Mekeshkin	Russia	D	—	—	—	—	—	—	—	—	—	—
1994	7	171	Dan Reja	Canada	LW	—	—	—	—	—	—	—	—	—	—
1994	8	197	Chris Patrick	United States	LW	—	—	—	—	—	—	—	—	—	—
1994	9	223	John Tuohy	United States	D	—	—	—	—	—	—	—	—	—	—
1994	10	249	Richard Zednik	Slovakia	RW	745	200	179	379	563	—	—	—	—	—
1994	11	275	Sergey Tertyshny	Russia	D	—	—	—	—	—	—	—	—	—	—
1995	1	17	Brad Church	Canada	LW	2	0	0	0	0	—	—	—	—	—
1995	1	23	Miika Elomo	Finland	LW	2	0	1	1	2	—	—	—	—	—
1995	2	43	Dwayne Hay	Canada	LW	79	2	4	6	22	—	—	—	—	—
1995	4	93	Sebastien Charpentier	Canada	G	26	0	0	0	0	6	14	1	—	2.93
1995	4	95	Joel Theriault	Canada	D	—	—	—	—	—	—	—	—	—	—
1995	5	105	Benoit Gratton	Canada	C	58	6	10	16	58	—	—	—	—	—
1995	5	124	Joel Cort	Canada	D	—	—	—	—	—	—	—	—	—	—
1995	6	147	Frederick Jobin	Canada	D	—	—	—	—	—	—	—	—	—	—
1995	8	199	Vasily Turkovsky	Russia	D	—	—	—	—	—	—	—	—	—	—
1995	9	225	Scott Swanson	United States	D	—	—	—	—	—	—	—	—	—	—
1996	1	4	Alexander Volchkov	Russia	RW	3	0	0	0	0	—	—	—	—	—
1996	1	17	Jaroslav Svejkovsky	Czech Republic	LW	113	23	19	42	56	—	—	—	—	—
1996	2	43	Jan Bulis	Czech Republic	C	552	96	149	245	268	—	—	—	—	—
1996	3	58	Sergei Zimakov	Russia	D	—	—	—	—	—	—	—	—	—	—
1996	3	74	David Weninger	Canada	G	—	—	—	—	—	—	—	—	—	—
1996	3	78	Shawn McNeil	Canada	C	—	—	—	—	—	—	—	—	—	—
1996	4	85	Justin Davis	Canada	RW	—	—	—	—	—	—	—	—	—	—
1996	5	126	Matt Lahey	Canada	LW	—	—	—	—	—	—	—	—	—	—
1996	6	153	A. J. Van Bruggen	United States	RW	—	—	—	—	—	—	—	—	—	—
1996	7	180	Mike Anderson	United States	C	—	—	—	—	—	—	—	—	—	—
1996	8	206	Oleg Orekhovsky	Russia	D	—	—	—	—	—	—	—	—	—	—
1996	9	232	Chad Cavanagh	Canada	C	—	—	—	—	—	—	—	—	—	—
1997	1	9	Nick Boynton	Canada	C	605	34	110	144	862	—	—	—	—	—
1997	2	35	Jean-Francois Fortin	Canada	D	71	1	4	5	42	—	—	—	—	—
1997	3	89	Curtis Cruickshank	Canada	G	—	—	—	—	—	—	—	—	—	—
1997	5	116	Kevin Caulfield	United States	RW	—	—	—	—	—	—	—	—	—	—
1997	6	143	Henrik Petre	Sweden	D	—	—	—	—	—	—	—	—	—	—
1997	8	200	Pierre-Luc Therrien	Canada	G	—	—	—	—	—	—	—	—	—	—
1997	9	226	Matt Oikawa	Canada	RW	—	—	—	—	—	—	—	—	—	—
1998	2	49	Jormar Cruz	Canada	G	—	—	—	—	—	—	—	—	—	—
1998	3	59	Todd Hornung	Canada	C	—	—	—	—	—	—	—	—	—	—
1998	4	106	Krys Barch	Canada	RW	381	12	23	35	812	—	—	—	—	—
1998	4	107	Chris Corrinet	United States	RW	8	0	1	1	6	—	—	—	—	—
1998	5	118	Mike Siklenka	Canada	D	2	0	0	0	0	—	—	—	—	—
1998	5	125	Erik Wendell	United States	C	—	—	—	—	—	—	—	—	—	—
1998	7	179	Nathan Forster	Canada	D	—	—	—	—	—	—	—	—	—	—
1998	7	193	Rastislav Stana	Slovakia	G	6	0	0	0	0	1	2	0	—	3.13
1998	8	220	Mike Farrell	United States	RW	13	0	0	0	2	—	—	—	—	—
1998	9	251	Blake Evans	Canada	C	—	—	—	—	—	—	—	—	—	—
1999	1	7	Kris Beech	Canada	C	198	25	42	67	113	—	—	—	—	—
1999	2	29	Michal Sivek	Czech Republic	C	38	3	3	6	14	—	—	—	—	—
1999	2	31	Charlie Stephens	Canada	C	8	0	2	2	4	—	—	—	—	—
1999	2	34	Ross Lupaschuk	Canada	D	3	0	0	0	4	—	—	—	—	—
1999	2	37	Nolan Yonkman	Canada	D	76	1	9	10	140	—	—	—	—	—
1999	5	132	Roman Tvrdon	Slovakia	LW	9	0	1	1	2	—	—	—	—	—
1999	6	175	Kyle Clark	United States	RW	—	—	—	—	—	—	—	—	—	—
1999	7	192	David Bornhammar	Sweden	D	—	—	—	—	—	—	—	—	—	—
1999	8	219	Maxim Orlov	Russia	C	—	—	—	—	—	—	—	—	—	—
1999	9	249	Igor Shadilov	Russia	D	—	—	—	—	—	—	—	—	—	—
2000	1	26	Brian Sutherby	Canada	C	460	41	49	90	533	—	—	—	—	—
2000	2	43	Matt Pettinger	Canada	LW	422	65	58	123	210	—	—	—	—	—
2000	2	61	Jakub Cutta	Czech Republic	D	8	0	0	0	0	—	—	—	—	—
2000	4	100	Ryan Van Buskirk	Canada	D	—	—	—	—	—	—	—	—	—	—
2000	5	163	Ivan Nepryaev	Russia	C	—	—	—	—	—	—	—	—	—	—
2000	9	289	Bjorn Nord	Sweden	D	—	—	—	—	—	—	—	—	—	—
2001	2	58	Nathan Paetsch	Canada	D	167	7	35	42	114	—	—	—	—	—
2001	3	90	Owen Fussey	Canada	LW	4	0	1	1	0	—	—	—	—	—
2001	4	125	Jeff Lucky	Canada	C	—	—	—	—	—	—	—	—	—	—
2001	5	160	Artyom Ternavsky	Russia	D	—	—	—	—	—	—	—	—	—	—
2001	6	191	Zbynek Novak	Czech Republic	LW	—	—	—	—	—	—	—	—	—	—
2001	7	221	Johnny Oduya	Sweden	D	850	41	149	190	372	—	—	—	—	—
2001	8	249	Matthew Maglione	United States	D	—	—	—	—	—	—	—	—	—	—
2001	8	254	Petr Polcik	Slovakia	LW	—	—	—	—	—	—	—	—	—	—
2001	9	275	Robert Muller	Germany	G	—	—	—	—	—	—	—	—	—	—
2001	9	284	Viktor Hubl	Czech Republic	LW	—	—	—	—	—	—	—	—	—	—
2002	1	12	Steve Eminger	Canada	D	488	19	80	99	359	—	—	—	—	—
2002	1	13	Alexander Semin	Russia	LW	650	239	278	517	582	—	—	—	—	—
2002	1	17	Boyd Gordon	Canada	RW	706	56	105	161	149	—	—	—	—	—
2002	2	59	Maxime Daigneault	Canada	G	—	—	—	—	—	—	—	—	—	—
2002	3	77	Patrick Wellar	Canada	D	—	—	—	—	—	—	—	—	—	—
2002	3	92	Derek Krestanovich	Canada	C	—	—	—	—	—	—	—	—	—	—
2002	4	109	Jevon Desautels	Canada	LW	—	—	—	—	—	—	—	—	—	—
2002	4	118	Petr Dvorak	Czech Republic	RW	—	—	—	—	—	—	—	—	—	—
2002	5	145	Robert Gherson	Canada	G	—	—	—	—	—	—	—	—	—	—
2002	6	179	Marian Havel	Czech Republic	C	—	—	—	—	—	—	—	—	—	—
2002	7	209	Joni Lindlof	Finland	LW	—	—	—	—	—	—	—	—	—	—
2002	8	242	Igor Ignatushkin	Russia	LW	—	—	—	—	—	—	—	—	—	—
2002	9	272	Patric Blomdahl	Sweden	LW	—	—	—	—	—	—	—	—	—	—
2003	1	18	Eric Fehr	Canada	RW	652	113	108	221	217	—	—	—	—	—
2003	3	83	Stephen Werner	United States	RW	—	—	—	—	—	—	—	—	—	—
2003	4	109	Andreas Valdix	Sweden	LW	—	—	—	—	—	—	—	—	—	—
2003	5	155	Josh Robertson	United States	C	—	—	—	—	—	—	—	—	—	—
2003	8	249	Andrew Joudrey	Canada	C	1	0	0	0	0	—	—	—	—	—
2003	9	279	Mark Olafson	Canada	RW	—	—	—	—	—	—	—	—	—	—
2004	1	1	Alexander Ovechkin	Russia	LW	1573	929	758	1687	857	—	—	—	—	—
2004	1	27	Jeff Schultz	Canada	D	409	11	65	76	137	—	—	—	—	—
2004	1	29	Mike Green	Canada	D	880	150	351	501	592	—	—	—	—	—
2004	2	33	Chris Bourque	United States	LW	51	2	6	8	18	—	—	—	—	—
2004	2	62	Mikhail Yunkov	Russia	C	—	—	—	—	—	—	—	—	—	—
2004	3	66	Sami Lepisto	Finland	D	176	6	29	35	137	—	—	—	—	—
2004	3	88	Clayton Barthel	Canada	D	—	—	—	—	—	—	—	—	—	—
2004	5	132	Oscar Hedman	Sweden	D	—	—	—	—	—	—	—	—	—	—
2004	5	138	Pasi Salonen	Finland	LW	—	—	—	—	—	—	—	—	—	—
2004	6	166	Peter Guggisberg	Switzerland	RW	—	—	—	—	—	—	—	—	—	—
2004	7	197	Andrew Gordon	Canada	RW	55	3	4	7	6	—	—	—	—	—
2004	8	230	Justin Mrazek	Canada	G	—	—	—	—	—	—	—	—	—	—
2004	9	263	Travis Morin	United States	C	13	0	1	1	0	—	—	—	—	—
2005	1	14	Sasha Pokulok	Canada	D	—	—	—	—	—	—	—	—	—	—
2005	1	27	Joe Finley	United States	D	21	0	1	1	32	—	—	—	—	—
2005	4	109	Andrew Thomas	United States	D	—	—	—	—	—	—	—	—	—	—
2005	4	118	Patrick McNeill	Canada	D	—	—	—	—	—	—	—	—	—	—
2005	5	143	Daren Machesney	Canada	G	—	—	—	—	—	—	—	—	—	—
2005	6	181	Tim Kennedy	United States	LW	162	15	24	39	60	—	—	—	—	—
2005	7	209	Viktor Dovgan	Russia	D	—	—	—	—	—	—	—	—	—	—
2006	1	4	Nicklas Backstrom	Sweden	C	1105	271	762	1033	504	—	—	—	—	—
2006	1	23	Semyon Varlamov	Russia	G	621	0	8	8	24	289	232	—	71	2.65
2006	2	34	Michal Neuvirth	Czech Republic	G	257	0	4	4	6	105	93	—	26	2.71
2006	2	35	Francois Bouchard	Canada	RW	—	—	—	—	—	—	—	—	—	—
2006	2	52	Keith Seabrook	Canada	D	—	—	—	—	—	—	—	—	—	—
2006	4	97	Oskar Osala	Finland	LW	3	0	0	0	0	—	—	—	—	—
2006	4	122	Luke Lynes	United States	F	—	—	—	—	—	—	—	—	—	—
2006	5	127	Maxime Lacroix	Canada	LW	—	—	—	—	—	—	—	—	—	—
2006	6	157	Brent Gwidt	United States	C	—	—	—	—	—	—	—	—	—	—
2006	6	177	Mathieu Perreault	Canada	C	708	143	210	353	322	—	—	—	—	—
2007	1	5	Karl Alzner	Canada	D	686	20	110	130	219	—	—	—	—	—
2007	2	34	Josh Godfrey	Canada	D	—	—	—	—	—	—	—	—	—	—
2007	2	46	Theo Ruth	United States	D	—	—	—	—	—	—	—	—	—	—
2007	3	84	Phil DeSimone	United States	C	—	—	—	—	—	—	—	—	—	—
2007	4	108	Brett Bruneteau	United States	C	—	—	—	—	—	—	—	—	—	—
2007	5	125	Brett Leffler	Canada	RW	—	—	—	—	—	—	—	—	—	—
2007	6	154	Dan Dunn	Canada	G	—	—	—	—	—	—	—	—	—	—
2007	6	180	Justin Taylor	Canada	C	—	—	—	—	—	—	—	—	—	—
2007	7	185	Nick Larson	United States	C	—	—	—	—	—	—	—	—	—	—
2007	7	199	Andrew Glass	United States	LW	—	—	—	—	—	—	—	—	—	—
2008	1	21	Anton Gustafsson	Sweden	C	—	—	—	—	—	—	—	—	—	—
2008	1	27	John Carlson	United States	D	1159	170	615	785	396	—	—	—	—	—
2008	2	57	Eric Mestery	Canada	D	—	—	—	—	—	—	—	—	—	—
2008	2	58	Dmitri Kugryshev	Russia	RW	—	—	—	—	—	—	—	—	—	—
2008	4	93	Braden Holtby	Canada	G	513	0	12	12	27	299	143	—	50	2.59
2008	5	144	Joel Broda	Canada	C	—	—	—	—	—	—	—	—	—	—
2008	6	174	Greg Burke	United States	LW	—	—	—	—	—	—	—	—	—	—
2008	7	204	Stefan Della Rovere	Canada	LW	7	0	0	0	11	—	—	—	—	—
2009	1	24	Marcus Johansson	Sweden	C	1058	200	366	566	166	—	—	—	—	—
2009	2	55	Dmitry Orlov	Russia	D	949	79	285	364	399	—	—	—	—	—
2009	3	85	Cody Eakin	Canada	C	701	110	146	256	278	—	—	—	—	—
2009	4	115	Patrick Wey	United States	D	9	0	3	3	5	—	—	—	—	—
2009	5	145	Brett Flemming	Canada	D	—	—	—	—	—	—	—	—	—	—
2009	6	175	Garrett Mitchell	Canada	RW	1	0	0	0	0	—	—	—	—	—
2009	7	205	Benjamin Casavant	Canada	LW	—	—	—	—	—	—	—	—	—	—
2010	1	26	Evgeny Kuznetsov	Russia	C	743	173	402	575	394	—	—	—	—	—
2010	3	86	Stanislav Galiev	Russia	RW	26	1	3	4	4	—	—	—	—	—
2010	4	112	Philipp Grubauer	Germany	G	402	0	8	8	6	179	151	—	37	2.65
2010	5	115	Caleb Herbert	United States	C	—	—	—	—	—	—	—	—	—	—
2010	6	176	Samuel Carrier	Canada	D	—	—	—	—	—	—	—	—	—	—
2011	4	117	Steffen Soberg	Norway	G	—	—	—	—	—	—	—	—	—	—
2011	5	147	Patrick Koudys	Canada	D	—	—	—	—	—	—	—	—	—	—
2011	6	177	Travis Boyd	United States	C	299	47	71	118	74	—	—	—	—	—
2011	7	207	Garrett Haar	United States	D	—	—	—	—	—	—	—	—	—	—
2012	1	11	Filip Forsberg	Sweden	RW	862	358	398	756	379	—	—	—	—	—
2012	1	16	Tom Wilson	Canada	RW	907	209	248	457	1649	—	—	—	—	—
2012	3	77	Chandler Stephenson	Canada	LW	653	118	252	370	170	—	—	—	—	—
2012	4	100	Thomas Di Pauli	United States	F	2	0	0	0	10	—	—	—	—	—
2012	4	107	Austin Wuthrich	United States	F	—	—	—	—	—	—	—	—	—	—
2012	5	137	Connor Carrick	United States	D	242	13	37	50	157	—	—	—	—	—
2012	6	167	Riley Barber	United States	F	16	0	0	0	4	—	—	—	—	—
2012	7	195	Christian Djoos	Sweden	D	155	7	31	38	28	—	—	—	—	—
2012	7	197	Jaynen Rissling	Canada	D	—	—	—	—	—	—	—	—	—	—
2012	7	203	Sergei Kostenko	Russia	G	—	—	—	—	—	—	—	—	—	—
2013	1	23	Andre Burakovsky	Sweden	LW	771	164	256	420	183	—	—	—	—	—
2013	2	53	Madison Bowey	Canada	D	158	5	35	40	104	—	—	—	—	—
2013	2	61	Zach Sanford	United States	LW	334	49	55	104	144	—	—	—	—	—
2013	5	144	Blake Heinrich	United States	D	—	—	—	—	—	—	—	—	—	—
2013	6	174	Brian Pinho	United States	C	2	0	0	0	0	—	—	—	—	—
2013	7	204	Tyler Lewington	Canada	D	12	1	2	3	40	—	—	—	—	—
2014	1	13	Jakub Vrana	Czech Republic	C	406	119	104	223	113	—	—	—	—	—
2014	2	39	Vitek Vanecek	Czech Republic	G	210	0	6	6	2	101	69	—	24	2.84
2014	3	89	Nathan Walker	Australia	LW	275	32	35	67	150	—	—	—	—	—
2014	5	134	Shane Gersich	United States	F	3	0	1	1	0	—	—	—	—	—
2014	6	159	Steven Spinner	United States	RW	—	—	—	—	—	—	—	—	—	—
2014	7	194	Kevin Elgestal	Sweden	RW	—	—	—	—	—	—	—	—	—	—
2015	1	22	Ilya Samsonov	Russia	G	200	0	5	5	6	118	48	—	25	2.77
2015	2	57	Jonas Siegenthaler	Switzerland	D	449	10	72	82	255	—	—	—	—	—
2015	5	143	Connor Hobbs	Canada	D	—	—	—	—	—	—	—	—	—	—
2015	6	173	Colby Williams	Canada	D	—	—	—	—	—	—	—	—	—	—
2016	1	28	Lucas Johansen	Canada	D	9	0	2	2	4	—	—	—	—	—
2016	3	87	Garrett Pilon	Canada	C	3	1	0	1	0	—	—	—	—	—
2016	4	117	Damien Riat	Switzerland	D	—	—	—	—	—	—	—	—	—	—
2016	5	145	Beck Malenstyn	Canada	LW	262	19	29	48	103	—	—	—	—	—
2016	5	147	Axel Jonsson-Fjallby	Sweden	LW	99	10	13	23	12	—	—	—	—	—
2016	6	177	Chase Priskie	United States	D	4	0	0	0	2	—	—	—	—	—
2016	7	207	Dmitriy Zaitsev	Russia	D	—	—	—	—	—	—	—	—	—	—
2017	4	120	Tobias Geisser	Switzerland	D	—	—	—	—	—	—	—	—	—	—
2017	5	151	Sebastian Walfridsson	Sweden	D	—	—	—	—	—	—	—	—	—	—
2017	6	182	Benton Maass	United States	D	—	—	—	—	—	—	—	—	—	—
2017	7	213	Kristian Roykas-Marthinsen	Norway	LW	—	—	—	—	—	—	—	—	—	—
2018	1	31	Alexander Alexeyev	Russia	D	80	1	7	8	12	—	—	—	—	—
2018	2	46	Martin Fehervary	Slovakia	D	380	27	75	102	151	—	—	—	—	—
2018	2	47	Kody Clark	Canada	RW	—	—	—	—	—	—	—	—	—	—
2018	3	93	Riley Sutter	Canada	RW	—	—	—	—	—	—	—	—	—	—
2018	4	124	Mitchell Gibson	United States	G	—	—	—	—	—	—	—	—	—	—
2018	6	161	Alex Kannok-Leipert	Canada	D	—	—	—	—	—	—	—	—	—	—
2018	7	217	Eric Florchuk	Canada	C	—	—	—	—	—	—	—	—	—	—
2019	1	25	Connor McMichael	Canada	C	315	67	87	154	130	—	—	—	—	—
2019	2	56	Brett Leason	Canada	RW	226	25	29	54	54	—	—	—	—	—
2019	3	91	Aliaksei Protas	Belarus	C	321	68	103	171	58	—	—	—	—	—
2019	5	153	Martin Has	Czech Republic	D	—	—	—	—	—	—	—	—	—	—
2020	1	22	Hendrix Lapierre	Canada	C	158	13	34	47	41	—	—	—	—	—
2020	4	117	Bogdan Trineyev	Russia	F	2	0	0	0	0	—	—	—	—	—
2020	5	148	Bear Hughes	United States	C	—	—	—	—	—	—	—	—	—	—
2020	6	179	Garin Bjorklund	Canada	G	—	—	—	—	—	—	—	—	—	—
2020	7	211	Oskar Magnusson	Sweden	C	—	—	—	—	—	—	—	—	—	—
2021	2	55	Vincent Iorio	Canada	D	36	0	4	4	12	—	—	—	—	—
2021	3	80	Brent Johnson	United States	D	—	—	—	—	—	—	—	—	—	—
2021	4	119	Joaquim Lemay	Canada	D	—	—	—	—	—	—	—	—	—	—
2021	5	151	Håkon Hänelt	Germany	F	—	—	—	—	—	—	—	—	—	—
2021	6	176	Dru Krebs	Canada	D	—	—	—	—	—	—	—	—	—	—
2021	6	183	Chase Clark	United States	G	—	—	—	—	—	—	—	—	—	—
2022	1	20	Ivan Miroshnichenko	Russia	LW	52	5	8	13	8	—	—	—	—	—
2022	2	37	Ryan Chesley	United States	D	—	—	—	—	—	—	—	—	—	—
2022	3	70	Alexander Suzdalev	Russia	LW	—	—	—	—	—	—	—	—	—	—
2022	3	85	Ludwig Persson	Sweden	LW	—	—	—	—	—	—	—	—	—	—
2022	5	149	Jake Karabela	Canada	C	—	—	—	—	—	—	—	—	—	—
2022	6	181	Ryan Hofer	Canada	C	—	—	—	—	—	—	—	—	—	—
2022	7	213	David Gucciardi	Canada	D	—	—	—	—	—	—	—	—	—	—
2023	1	8	Ryan Leonard	United States	RW	84	21	25	46	58	—	—	—	—	—
2023	2	40	Andrew Cristall	Canada	LW	—	—	—	—	—	—	—	—	—	—
2023	4	104	Patrick Thomas	Canada	C	—	—	—	—	—	—	—	—	—	—
2023	5	136	Cameron Allen	Canada	D	—	—	—	—	—	—	—	—	—	—
2023	7	200	Brett Hyland	Canada	C	—	—	—	—	—	—	—	—	—	—
2023	7	206	Antoine Keller	France	G	—	—	—	—	—	—	—	—	—	—
2024	1	17	Terik Parascak	Canada	RW	—	—	—	—	—	—	—	—	—	—
2024	2	43	Cole Hutson	United States	D	14	3	7	10	8	—	—	—	—	—
2024	2	52	Leon Muggli	Switzerland	D	—	—	—	—	—	—	—	—	—	—
2024	3	75	Ilya Protas	Belarus	LW	4	1	3	4	2	—	—	—	—	—
2024	3	90	Eriks Mateiko	Latvia	W	—	—	—	—	—	—	—	—	—	—
2024	4	114	Nicholas Kempf	United States	G	—	—	—	—	—	—	—	—	—	—
2024	6	178	Petr Sikora	Czech Republic	C	—	—	—	—	—	—	—	—	—	—
2024	7	212	Miroslav Satan Jr.	Slovakia	C	—	—	—	—	—	—	—	—	—	—
2025	1	27	Lynden Lakovic	Canada	RW	—	—	—	—	—	—	—	—	—	—
2025	2	37	Milton Gastrin	Sweden	C	—	—	—	—	—	—	—	—	—	—
2025	3	96	Maxim Schafer	Germany	LW	—	—	—	—	—	—	—	—	—	—
2025	5	155	Jackson Crowder	United States	C	—	—	—	—	—	—	—	—	—	—
2025	6	180	Aron Dahlqvist	Sweden	D	—	—	—	—	—	—	—	—	—	—
2026	1	18	Oliver Suvanto	Finland	C	—	—	—	—	—	—	—	—	—	—
2026	4	101	Tyus Sparks	United States	C	—	—	—	—	—	—	—	—	—	—
2026	5	144	Brian McFadden	United States	D	—	—	—	—	—	—	—	—	—	—
2026	7	208	Logan Stuart	United States	C	—	—	—	—	—	—	—	—	—	—

== See also ==
- 1974 NHL Expansion Draft
