= Brad Church =

Canadian ice hockey player (born 1976)

- Born: November 14, 1976 (age 49) Dauphin, Manitoba, Canada
- Height: 6 ft 1 in (185 cm)
- Weight: 210 lb (95 kg; 15 st 0 lb)
- Position: Left wing
- Shot: Left
- Played for: Washington Capitals
- NHL draft: 17th overall, 1995; Washington Capitals
- Playing career: 1996–2006

Brad Church (born November 14, 1976) is a Canadian professional ice hockey executive and former player. As a forward, Church played two games for the Washington Capitals and ten years of professional hockey in the minor leagues. Chosen 17th overall by the Capitals in the 1995 NHL entry draft, Church spent most of his time in the minors. After several years, the Capitals traded him in 1999 to the Edmonton Oilers, but he never made the parent club.

Church retired as a player following the 2005–06 season, and joined the Phoenix RoadRunners of the ECHL as an assistant coach. With eight games remaining in the season, head coach Ron Filion announced his resignation, and Church became the team's head coach. He led the club to their first ECHL playoff appearance, where they were swept by the Las Vegas Wranglers in four games.

Between 2014 and 2016, Church was chief operating officer for one of his former teams, the American Hockey League's Portland Pirates.

== Career statistics ==
			Regular season					Playoffs
Season	Team	League	GP	G	A	Pts	PIM	GP	G	A	Pts	PIM
1992–93	Dauphin Kings	MJHL	45	15	23	38	80	—	—	—	—	—
1993–94	Prince Albert Raiders	WHL	71	33	20	53	197	—	—	—	—	—
1994–95	Prince Albert Raiders	WHL	62	26	24	50	184	15	6	9	15	32
1995–96	Prince Albert Raiders	WHL	69	42	46	88	123	18	15	20	35	74
1996–97	Portland Pirates	AHL	50	4	8	12	92	1	0	0	0	0
1997–98	Washington Capitals	NHL	2	0	0	0	0	—	—	—	—	—
1997–98	Portland Pirates	AHL	59	6	5	11	98	9	2	4	6	14
1998–99	Portland Pirates	AHL	10	1	3	4	18	—	—	—	—	—
1998–99	Hampton Roads Admirals	ECHL	24	10	9	19	129	—	—	—	—	—
1998–99	Hamilton Bulldogs	AHL	9	0	2	2	4	—	—	—	—	—
1998–99	New Orleans Brass	ECHL	5	3	4	7	4	11	1	1	2	22
1999–2000	Portland Pirates	AHL	56	9	17	26	52	4	1	1	2	4
1999–2000	Hampton Roads Admirals	ECHL	11	4	3	7	41	—	—	—	—	—
2000–01	Portland Pirates	AHL	61	14	18	32	90	3	1	1	2	18
2001–02	Portland Pirates	AHL	45	6	13	19	52	—	—	—	—	—
2001–02	Richmond Renegades	ECHL	8	6	5	11	13	—	—	—	—	—
2001–02	Lowell Lock Monsters	AHL	9	2	2	4	2	4	0	0	0	4
2002–03	Cleveland Barons	AHL	8	1	0	1	4	—	—	—	—	—
2002–03	Richmond Renegades	ECHL	64	29	45	74	121	—	—	—	—	—
2003–04	Manchester Monarchs	AHL	11	5	6	11	0	—	—	—	—	—
2003–04	Reading Royals	ECHL	56	22	19	41	91	15	4	5	9	20
2004–05	Florida Everblades	ECHL	62	23	31	54	62	19	5	7	12	40
2005–06	Missouri River Otters	UHL	15	4	3	7	11	—	—	—	—	—
2005–06	Kalamazoo Wings	UHL	33	9	18	27	51	7	1	0	1	4
AHL totals			318	48	74	122	412	21	4	6	10	40
NHL totals			2	0	0	0	0	—	—	—	—	—
ECHL totals			230	97	116	213	461	45	10	13	23	82

Preceded by Alexander Kharlamov	Washington Capitals first-round draft pick 1995	Succeeded by Miika Elomo
