= Valeri Kharlamov =

Russian ice hockey player (1948–1981)

- Hockey Hall of Fame, 2005
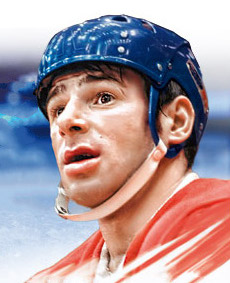
- Kharlamov on a 2023 Russian stamp
- Born: 14 January 1948 Moscow, Russian SFSR, Soviet Union
- Died: 27 August 1981 (aged 33) near Solnechnogorsk, Russian SFSR, Soviet Union
- Height: 5 ft 9 in (175 cm)
- Weight: 168 lb (76 kg; 12 st 0 lb)
- Position: Left wing
- Shot: Left
- Played for: CSKA Moscow
- National team: Soviet Union
- Playing career: 1967–1981
Medal record
Olympic Games
Gold medal – first place	1972 Sapporo	Team
Gold medal – first place	1976 Innsbruck	Team
Silver medal – second place	1980 Lake Placid	Team
World Championships
Gold medal – first place	1969 Sweden	Team
Gold medal – first place	1970 Sweden	Team
Gold medal – first place	1971 Switzerland	Team
Gold medal – first place	1973 Soviet Union	Team
Gold medal – first place	1974 Finland	Team
Gold medal – first place	1975 West Germany	Team
Gold medal – first place	1978 Czechoslovakia	Team
Gold medal – first place	1979 Soviet Union	Team
Silver medal – second place	1972 Czechoslovakia	Team
Silver medal – second place	1976 Poland	Team
Bronze medal – third place	1977 Austria	Team

Valeri Borisovich Kharlamov (Russian: Вале́рий Бори́сович Харла́мов, IPA: [vɐˈlʲerʲɪj bɐˈrʲisəvʲɪtɕ xɐrˈlaməf]; 14 January 1948 – 27 August 1981) was a Russian ice hockey forward who played for CSKA Moscow in the Soviet League from 1967 until his death in 1981. Kharlamov was a speedy, intelligent, skilled and dominant player, being named the Soviet Championship League most valuable player in 1972 and 1973. An offensive player who was considered very creative on the ice, he also led the league in scoring in 1972. He was also a gifted skater who was able to make plays at top speed. Kharlamov was considered one of the best players of his era, as well as one of the greatest players of all time.

In international play, Kharlamov represented the Soviet Union at 11 World Championships, winning 8 gold medals, 2 silvers and 1 bronze. He participated in three Winter Olympics, 1972, 1976 and 1980, finishing with two gold medals and one silver, and participated in the 1972 Summit Series against Team Canada. He spent most of his career playing on a line with Vladimir Petrov and Boris Mikhailov, and this trio is considered one of the best in the history of ice hockey.

Kharlamov was killed in a car accident in 1981. After his death, Kharlamov was elected to the International Ice Hockey Federation Hall of Fame, the Hockey Hall of Fame, the Russian Hockey Hall of Fame and was selected as one of the forwards on the IIHF Centennial All-Star Team. The Kharlamov Trophy is presented annually to the best Russian hockey player in the National Hockey League, as chosen by his peers. The Kharlamov Cup is presented to the champion of the Minor Hockey League playoffs, and the Kontinental Hockey League named one of their four divisions after him.

== Early life ==
Kharlamov was born in Moscow to Boris and Begoñita Kharlamov. Boris was a mechanic at a factory, Kommunar, while Begoñita worked with Aeroflot. Begoñita, who was born Carmen Orive Abad, was Basque and originally from Bilbao, Spain, but moved to the Soviet Union in 1937 as a child refugee from the Spanish Civil War (see Niños de Rusia). Boris Kharlamov's parents were factory workers from Moscow. He was named after Valery Chkalov, a pioneering Soviet pilot. He also had a younger sister, Tatiana. In 1956, when he was eight years old, Kharlamov moved to Spain with his mother, though they both returned to the Soviet Union after several months. Due to his mother's heritage, Kharlamov would be nicknamed "The Spaniard" throughout his career.

At age five, Kharlamov first started to skate, fastening his father's blades onto his own shoes. He was trained by Boris, who had played hockey himself. However, Kharlamov, who enjoyed playing football as well, was quite sickly as a youth; in 1961, he was diagnosed with rheumatic fever and doctors ordered him to cease any physical activity, and spent several months in hospital, though he ultimately recovered with no apparent cause nor lingering effects.

== Playing career ==
=== Soviet League ===
Kharlamov successfully tried-out for CSKA Moscow when he was 12, and joined their sports school. He joined the senior team for the 1967–68 season, and made his debut with CSKA on 22 October 1967 against HC Sibir. However, Anatoly Tarasov, the coach of the team, felt Kharlamov was not good enough for the team, so after 15 matches with CSKA he sent Kharlamov to join Zvezda Chebarkul, who played in the third division. He would lead the team in scoring with 34 goals in 32 games.

The following season Kharlamov was brought back to CSKA full-time. In 42 games he scored 37 goals and had 12 assists and finished third in the league in scoring with 49 points; it was during a match in October 1968 that he was first put on a line with Vladimir Petrov and Boris Mikhailov; the three of them would play together for the next years both with CSKA and internationally, forming one of the most famous lines in hockey history. In the off-season he and his linemates Petrov and Mikhailov were awarded the title of Merited Master of Sport in recognition of winning an international tournament (which would become the Izvestia Cup). Kharlamov scored a further 33 goals in 1969–70, and had placed fifth overall in points with 43, as CSKA won the league championship once again. He led the league in scoring for the first time in 1970–71, with 40 goals, and finished second overall in scoring with 52, and CSKA repeated as champions.

Although Kharlamov never played in North America, he was drafted by the Calgary Broncos of the World Hockey Association, along with Soviet teammates Petrov and Alexander Maltsev in early 1972.

== International play ==
=== World Championships ===
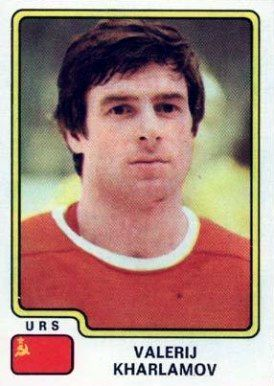
Kharlamov in 1979

Kharlamov's career in Soviet hockey was well established by the time he came to greater attention through his play in international hockey. His first tournament for the Soviet Union was the 1969 World Championship, where he helped the team capture the gold medal. Kharlamov was a fixture on the Soviet national team roster for the next decade. He played in eleven World Championships in total, capturing 8 gold medals, 2 silvers and 1 bronze. He was named to the tournament All-Star team four times (1971, 1972, 1973 and 1976). He played a total of 105 games in the World Championships, scoring 74 goals and adding 82 assists (156 points).

=== Summit Series ===
As World Championships were commonly played in Europe, and National Hockey League (NHL) players were not allowed to participate in the Olympics either, Kharlamov and his teammates were still a somewhat unknown entity when the 1972 Summit Series was played. The eight game series, with four games played in Canada, and four in the Soviet Union was one of the first opportunities for the two countries to put their best hockey players against each other. Most pundits thought Canada would win convincingly.

In the first game of the series, the Soviet Union stunned Canada with a 7–3 victory. Kharlamov scored two goals on Ken Dryden during the second period, and was named the game's Most Valuable Player. Fresh observers of Kharlamov's play were universally impressed. Summit Series defenceman Serge Savard ranked him as one of the top five players of all time. Team Canada head coach Harry Sinden would later say of Kharlamov, "He had the skill and the ability of any player in the NHL at the time."

In the sixth game of the series, Bobby Clarke slashed Kharlamov, fracturing a bone in his ankle. He would miss the seventh game of the series, and returned to the lineup for the final game, but at much reduced effectiveness. At the time, many felt the slash was intentional. Assistant coach John Ferguson would later say "I called (Bobby) Clarke over to the bench, looked over at Kharlamov and said, 'I think he needs a tap on the ankle'." Clarke would similarly admit to the act, later saying "If I hadn't learned to lay on a two-hander once in a while, I'd never have left Flin Flon." As for Kharlamov himself, he had little doubt that an attempt had been made to limit his effectiveness, "I'm convinced that Bobby Clarke was given the job of taking me out of the game." Kharlamov's injury, and his diminished play in the aftermath have been regarded as a turning point for the series in Canada's favour, who won the series in the eighth and final game.

Two years later Kharlamov was in the Soviet lineup again during the 1974 Summit Series, playing against the best Canadian players from the World Hockey Association. The Soviets were victorious in this series, with four wins, one loss and three ties. Kharlamov scored two goals and added six assists in the series.

=== Olympics ===
Kharlamov helped the Soviet national ice hockey team to win gold medals at the 1972 and 1976 Winter Olympics. In five games during the 1972 tournament, Kharlamov scored nine goals and added seven assists. He won his second gold medal with the Soviet Union in 1976, contributing three goals and six assists. Kharlamov was also part of the silver medal-winning Soviet team at the 1980 Winter Olympics, which was his last international tournament. Overall, Kharlamov won two gold medals and one silver at the Olympics, scoring 36 points in 22 career games.

Kharlamov never played in a Canada Cup tournament. He missed the 1976 Canada Cup due to the injuries he sustained in his first major car accident, and was left off the roster for the 1981 Canada Cup just prior to his fatal car accident, as Tikhonov felt he was too old and not in good enough shape for the team. According to his mother-in-law, Kharlamov had been planning to announce his retirement after playing in the 1981 tournament.

== Death ==
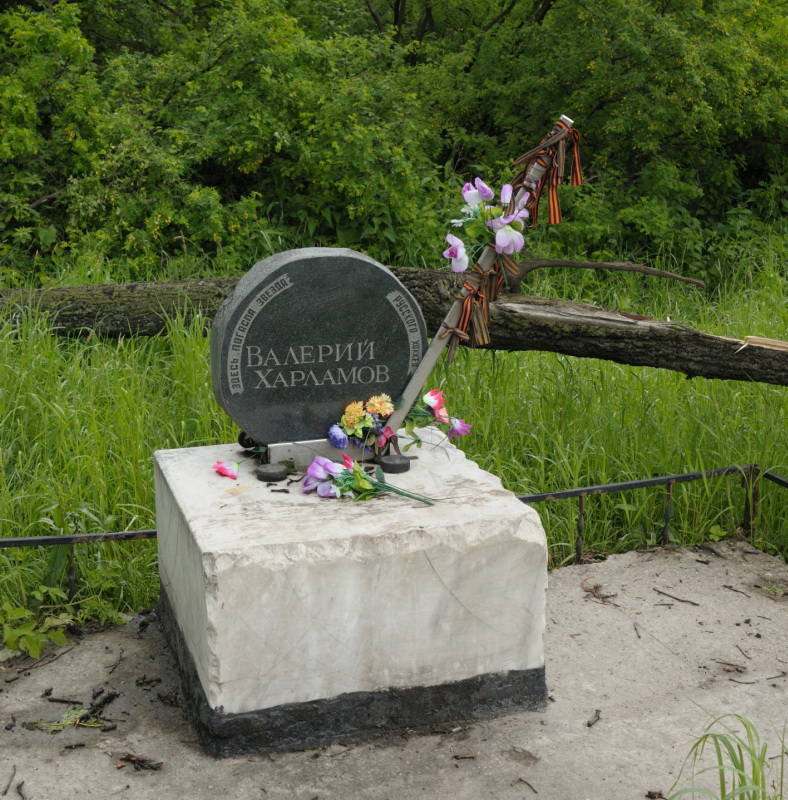
Roadside memorial to Valeri Kharlamov, near the site of his fatal accident.

Kharlamov was still active with CSKA when he was killed in a car crash on 27 August 1981. Prior to the crash, Kharlamov had been informed that he would not be a member of the Soviet team playing in the 1981 Canada Cup. Coach Viktor Tikhonov said that Kharlamov was left off the team over concerns about his conditioning. Irina, Kharlamov's wife, was driving back to Moscow from the family's cottage when she lost control and crossed into opposing traffic, hitting a truck head-on. Irina did not have a driver's license at the time of the crash. When the bodies were recovered, Kharlamov was reaching over from his seat, holding onto the steering wheel. Irina's cousin was also killed. Fans lined the streets during his funeral procession in Moscow, and they filed past his casket which rested at centre ice of CSKA's arena. Near the scene of the crash, a memorial stone in the shape of a hockey puck is inscribed, "The star of Russian hockey fell here."

== Legacy ==
After his death, Kharlamov's teammates with CSKA decided that no one at any level of the organization would wear Kharlamov's #17 sweater, until his son Alexander was old enough to wear it. Alexander wore #17 until he was a teenager, but later switched to #22, feeling that the expectations that went along with his father's sweater number were too great. When he found himself playing for Tikhonov with the CSKA in 1992, the decision was taken away from him, and he was issued the #17 sweater. After initially being reluctant, Alexander said "Now I am used to it. I felt an additional burden on my shoulders. But now I don't feel anything like that." The #17 is not worn by any member of the Russian national team at senior international competitions. Ilya Kovalchuk usually wears #17 in honor of Kharlamov in club competitions, his father's favorite player. In his memory, Sovetsky Sport newspaper established the Kharlamov Trophy in 2002; it is awarded annually to the best Russian player in the National Hockey League, as selected by the Russian players in the league. The annual winner of the playoffs in Russia's Junior Hockey League is awarded the Kharlamov Cup. The trophy features a figure modeled after Kharlamov at the top. One of the divisions in the Eastern Conference of the Kontinental Hockey League is named in his honor as well. In 2013, director Nikolay Lebedev released the biopic Legend No. 17, with Danila Kozlovsky portraying Kharlamov for most of the film. "Legend No 17" was nominated for 11 Golden Eagle Awards in 2013, and captured six of them, including Best Screenplay. The movie has been described as a personal favorite of Vladimir Putin.

Kharlamov was posthumously inducted into the International Ice Hockey Federation (IIHF) Hall of Fame in 1998. The Milestone Award is given by the IIHF Hall of Fame to teams that have made significant contributions to international hockey. In 2012, Kharlamov's 1972 Summit Series Soviet Union team was given this honor. To celebrate the 100th anniversary of the IIHF in 2008, a panel of experts named Kharlamov to the Centennial All-Star Team, along with three other Soviet stars, Vladislav Tretiak, Viacheslav Fetisov and Sergei Makarov. Kharlamov was inducted into the Hockey Hall of Fame in 2005. His induction was met with praise from one of the players who idolized him, Ilya Kovalchuk. Kharlamov was the second Soviet trained player, after Tretiak, to be inducted into the Hall of Fame. Upon hearing the news of his father's induction, Alexander Kharlamov said "I want to say thank you for remembering my father." In 2014, Kharlamov was part of the inaugural class inducted into the Russian Hockey Hall of Fame.

== Playing style ==
Small in stature (he was measured as 1.75 m (5 ft 9 in) and 76 kilograms (168 lb) during the Summit Series), Kharlamov was a gifted offensive player. During his prime, he was one of the dominant players in Soviet hockey, and he maintained this reputation during international tournaments. Kharlamov loved the creative opportunities his sport provided saying "I like to score beautiful goals." Some compared Kharlamov's play to Wayne Gretzky, in the sense that their overall play was greater than their individual skills, such as skating or shooting would indicate. He was very popular with his fans and teammates.

== Personal life ==
Kharlamov and Irina had two children, a son, Alexander, commonly known as "Sasha" and a daughter, Begonita. Valeri married Irina in 1975, after Alexander was born. At that time Kharlamov was unaware he had a son, until he received a phone call from Irina telling him he was the baby's father. After their parents' death, the children went to live with their maternal grandmother in Moscow. Alexander was only five years old when his father died, and does not remember him well, although he has seen recordings of his games. Alexander would also become an ice hockey player, and was selected fifteenth overall by the Washington Capitals in the 1994 NHL entry draft, though he never played in the NHL, playing in the North American minor leagues where he made a significant contribution to the Hampton Roads Admirals winning the Kelly Cup, and back in Russia before retiring in 2004. Alexander's son is named Valeri, after his grandfather, although his sport of choice is football, rather than hockey. After his death, Kharlamov was buried in the Kuntsevo Cemetery in the Kuntsevo District of Moscow.

== Career statistics ==
=== Regular season ===
Season	Team	League	GP	G	A	Pts	PIM
1967–68	CSKA Moscow	Soviet	15	2	3	5	6
1968–69	CSKA Moscow	Soviet	42	37	12	49	24
1969–70	CSKA Moscow	Soviet	33	33	10	43	16
1970–71	CSKA Moscow	Soviet	34	40	12	52	18
1971–72	CSKA Moscow	Soviet	31	24	16	40	22
1972–73	CSKA Moscow	Soviet	27	19	13	32	22
1973–74	CSKA Moscow	Soviet	26	20	10	30	28
1974–75	CSKA Moscow	Soviet	31	15	24	39	35
1975–76	CSKA Moscow	Soviet	34	18	18	36	6
1976–77	CSKA Moscow	Soviet	21	18	8	26	16
1977–78	CSKA Moscow	Soviet	29	18	24	42	35
1978–79	CSKA Moscow	Soviet	41	22	26	48	36
1979–80	CSKA Moscow	Soviet	41	16	22	38	40
1980–81	CSKA Moscow	Soviet	30	9	16	25	14
Soviet totals			438	293	214	507	318

=== International ===
Year	Team	Comp	GP	G	A	Pts	PIM
1969	Soviet Union	WC	10	6	7	13	4
1970	Soviet Union	WC	9	7	3	10	4
1971	Soviet Union	WC	10	5	12	17	2
1972	Soviet Union	SS	7	3	4	7	16
1972	Soviet Union	OG	5	9	7	16	2
1972	Soviet Union	WC	9	8	6	14	10
1973	Soviet Union	WC	10	9	14	23	31
1974	Soviet Union	SS	8	2	6	8	4
1974	Soviet Union	WC	10	5	5	10	8
1975	Soviet Union	WC	9	10	6	16	4
1976	Soviet Union	OG	6	3	6	9	6
1976	Soviet Union	WC	10	4	10	14	4
1977	Soviet Union	WC	10	9	7	16	4
1978	Soviet Union	WC	10	4	5	9	4
1979	Soviet Union	WC	8	7	7	14	4
1980	Soviet Union	OG	7	3	8	11	2
World Championship totals			105	74	82	156	79
Olympic totals			18	15	21	36	10

== Awards and honours ==
=== Soviet Union and Russia ===
Award	Year
Merited Master of Sport	1969
Soviet League Player of the Year	1971–72, 1972–73
Russian Hockey Hall of Fame	2014

=== International ===
Award	Year
World Ice Hockey Championships All-Star Team	1971, 1972, 1973, 1976
IIHF Hall of Fame	1998
IIHF Centennial All-Star Team	2008
Hockey Hall of Fame	2005

== Cited sources ==
- Cole, Stephen (2015), Hockey Night Fever: Mullets, Mayhem and the Game's Coming of Age in the 1970s, Toronto: Doubleday Canada, ISBN 978-0-385-68212-1
- MacSkimming, Roy (1996), Cold War: The Amazing Canada-Soviet Hockey Series of 1972, Vancouver: Greystone Books, ISBN 9781550544732
- Martin, Lawrence (1990), The Red Machine: The Soviet Quest to Dominate Canada's Game, Toronto: Doubleday Canada, ISBN 0-385-25272-2
- Podnieks, Andrew, ed. (November 2013), 2014 IIHF Guide and Record Book, Toronto: Fenn/McClelland Stewart, ISBN 978-0771046391

Awards and achievements
Preceded by Anatoli Firsov	Soviet MVP; 1972, 1973	Succeeded by Vladislav Tretiak
Preceded by Alexander Maltsev	Soviet Scoring Champion; 1972	Succeeded by Vladimir Petrov
