= Bâtisseurs de Montcalm =

Hockey team in Quebec, Canada

- City: Saint-Roch-de-l'Achigan, Quebec
- League: Ligue Nord-Américaine de Hockey
- Founded: 2022
- Folded: 2024
- Home arena: Complexe JC Perreault
- Colours: Red, black, and grey
- Owner: Éric Brisson
- General manager: Dany Corneau
- Head coach: Daniel Gauthier
- Website: https://batisseurs.lnah.com/

The Montcalm Builders (French: Bâtisseurs de Montcalm) were a professional ice hockey team based in Saint-Roch-de-l'Achigan, Quebec, Canada. The team was part of the Ligue Nord-Américaine de Hockey (LNAH), and played at the Complexe JC Perreault. The team was announced as an expansion team for the LNAH in April 2022 with the intent to begin play immediately in the 2022–23 season following an expansion draft set for early June 2022.

The team announced its first head coach, Éric Labrosse, on June 1, 2022. However, Labrosse left the team before its first game to become an assistant coach for the Moncton Wildcats and was replaced by Daniel Gauthier.

The team went on hiatus for the 2023–24 LNAH season, with the intent to return for the 2024–25 season but later announced they would not return.

== Season-by-season record ==
Note: GP = Games played, W = Wins, L = Losses, OTL = Overtime losses, SOL = shootout losses, Pts = Points, GF = Goals for, GA = Goals against, PIM = Penalties in minutes

Regular season											Playoffs				
Season	GP	W	L	OTL	SOL	Pts	GF	GA	PIM	Standing	Year	1st round	2nd round	3rd round	Vertdure Cup
2022–23	36	13	16	5	2	33	133	175	684	7th (last)	2023	L 1–4 to Thetford	—	—	—
