= Portland Pirates =

Ice hockey team

- City: Portland, Maine
- League: American Hockey League
- Founded: 1975; 51 years ago (in the NAHL)
- Operated: 1993–2016
- Home arena: Cross Insurance Arena
- Colors: Black, red, silver, white

Franchise history
- 1975–1982: Erie Blades
- 1982–1993: Baltimore Skipjacks
- 1993–2016: Portland Pirates
- 2016–present: Springfield Thunderbirds

Championships
- Division titles: 2: (2005–06, 2010–11)
- Conference titles: 1: (1995–96)
- Calder Cups: 1: (1993–94)

The Portland Pirates were a minor league professional ice hockey team in the American Hockey League (AHL). Their home arena was the Cross Insurance Arena in downtown Portland, Maine. The franchise was previously known as the Baltimore Skipjacks from 1982 to 1993.

The Pirates were affiliated with the Washington Capitals (1993–2005), Anaheim Ducks (2005–2008), Buffalo Sabres (2008–2011), Phoenix/Arizona Coyotes (2011–2015), and the Florida Panthers (2015–2016). The organization hosted the AHL All-Star Classic in 2003 and 2010.

On May 4, 2016, the Pirates announced it had signed a letter of intent with an outside buyer to sell and relocate the franchise for the 2016–17 season. It was reported that the team would be relocated to Springfield, Massachusetts following the pending sale and relocation of the Springfield Falcons franchise to Tucson, Arizona. The transaction was approved by the AHL on May 23, 2016, and the franchise became the Springfield Thunderbirds.

== History ==
=== Capitals era ===
Tom Ebright, owner of the Baltimore Skipjacks, had a daughter who was an intern at the East Coast Hockey League's Nashville Knights. Liking the way the Knights did business, Ebright contacted Knights owner, W. Godfrey Wood, asking to relocate the Skipjacks to a better market. Wood relocated the team to his home region of Portland, Maine, leading to the creation of the Portland Pirates in 1993 with an affiliation to the Washington Capitals. The Pirates filled the void made by the Maine Mariners who had departed to become the Providence Bruins a year earlier. On August 4, 1993, forward Eric Fenton was signed to a professional contract to become the very first member of the Portland Pirates team.

Under general manager and CEO Wood, who invested in management and creative marketing, the Pirates led the AHL in tickets sold, sponsorships, and sellouts for their first 3 years. The Pirates first season proved to be their most successful as they won the Calder Cup with a 43–27–10 record and was third overall in attendance with an average of 5,872 fans. Their next season they had 104 points but were upset in the 1st round of the playoffs. In the 1995–96 season they again reached the Calder Cup Finals, despite a sub-par record of 32–34–10, but lost to the Rochester Americans. For the first four seasons, the head coach was Barry Trotz, who later became a long-time NHL head coach and won a Stanley Cup.

Since then, the Pirates had mixed success, routinely making the playoffs and being eliminated early on. This included an excellent 100 point season in 1999–00 only to be eliminated from the playoffs in the first round. The Capitals affiliation ended after 12 seasons in 2005.

=== Ducks era ===
In 2005, the Pirates announced a five-year lease extension at the Cross Insurance Arena, ending speculation that the team might relocate. The Pirates also signed a three-year affiliation agreement with the Mighty Ducks of Anaheim.

With the Ducks, the Pirates had more mixed success. The team qualified for the 2006 Calder Cup playoffs and made it to the Calder Cup conference finals, only to be defeated by the eventual Calder Cup-winning Hershey Bears in seven games. The team then missed the 2007 playoff. Then the Pirates again made it to the Calder Cup conference finals again in 2008 before being eliminated by the Wilkes-Barre/Scranton Penguins in seven games.

=== Sabres era ===
On June 3, 2008, the Anaheim Ducks announced they were affiliating with the Iowa Chops instead of renewing the agreement with the Pirates. On June 10, 2008, the Pirates and the Buffalo Sabres announced that they had reached a new affiliation agreement, ending several months of speculation.

On August 5, 2008, the team announced that Kevin Dineen has been retained as head coach.

On February 10, 2009, the team played in Buffalo at HSBC Arena for the first time before a crowd of 11,144. The Pirates lost 4-3 in a shootout to the Albany River Rats. The Sabres' faithful were pleased with the aggressive play and numerous fights during the game. It was then announced that the Pirates would play in Buffalo twice in 2009–10. The first game would be played on November 12 and the second would be March 7; both games would be against the Rochester Americans (the Sabres' then previous AHL affiliate).

On March 17, 2010, the Pirates signed a two-year lease extension with the Cross Insurance Arena. The agreement prevented any further Pirates home games from being played outside the arena.

In May 2011, the Sabres had indicated a willingness to break from its affiliation agreement with the Pirates and re-affiliate with the Rochester Americans, with Sabres owner Terry Pegula intending to buy the Amerks. The Pirates had to sign off on the agreement, since their agreement with the Sabres ran through 2014. On June 24, 2011, the American Hockey League approved the sale of the Rochester Americans to Pegula; it also included the buyout of the affiliation contract with the Portland Pirates.

=== Coyotes era ===
On June 27, 2011, the Phoenix Coyotes announced that the franchise had entered into a five-year player development contract with the Pirates. WMTW-TV mentioned that during the announcement of the Coyotes being the Pirates affiliate that two of the four teams that were negotiating with the Pirates wanted the Pirates to change the team name and logo, but the Pirates agreed to the deal with Phoenix in order to keep their name and logo and because the Coyotes "wanted it the most".

During the 2012–13 season, the Pirates played six games at the Androscoggin Bank Colisée in Lewiston, Maine in preparation of renovations at the Cross Insurance Arena. On April 17, 2013, the Pirates and Cumberland County announced a five-year lease, with the option for another five years, to stay at the Cross Insurance Arena in Portland, though that was thrown into question due to a dispute over revenue from food sales (see lease dispute section below). Due to the dispute, the Pirates played their entire 2013-14 home schedule in Lewiston.

The Pirates were forced to play their final game of the 2013–14 season at their 400-seat practice facility in Saco, due to the Colisée being double booked with the game and a circus. The Pirates promised refunds to those who had bought tickets for the game in Lewiston, and stated that all ticket proceeds from the Saco game would go to the Barbara Bush Children's Hospital in Portland.

On May 7, 2014, they announced a one-year extension of the affiliation agreement and a small increase in ticket prices as part of the changes the team was doing to rebuild confidence with the community. Ron Cain, the new majority owner stated he was not concerned about getting a new affiliation agreement with the Coyotes for 2015–16 because it seemed likely that they were going to move their affiliate closer to Glendale, Arizona.

==== 2013 lease dispute ====
In 2013, the Pirates negotiated a new lease agreement with arena trustees, but refused to sign it after they determined that the percentage of food sales they were to receive under the lease would not result in the same amount of money as previously agreed terms calling for the Pirates to get a percentage of food and alcohol sales, which was ruled illegal by the State (as alcohol sales can only be controlled by the property owner).

The Pirates then announced that they would look for another arena to play their 2013–14 season in, most likely the Androscoggin Bank Colisée in Lewiston, where they were already playing the start of the season due to renovations at the arena. Arena trustees stated there would be no Pirates hockey at the arena that year and began seeking other tenants for the dates originally given to the Pirates. They further claimed to only break even on the presence of the Pirates and that their expenses would actually be less without them. The Pirates responded by filing a lawsuit against the arena seeking enforcement of the original unsigned agreement outline and an injunction to prevent the arena from reassigning dates for Pirates home games to other events.

The Pirates announced on September 26, 2013, that they would indeed play their entire 2013–14 home schedule at the Colisée. The dates for four games had to be changed from the original schedule. A spokesman for the AHL said that the Pirates had the rights to the Portland market and could play anywhere within a 50-mile radius of the city. The Phoenix Coyotes said they were prepared to move forward despite having hoped differences with the arena would be resolved. The Chairman of the Cross Insurance Arena Board of Trustees criticized the Pirates for demanding more of a "subsidy" for themselves and stated their desired lease agreement would cost county taxpayers money. The Pirates also stated they would continue their lawsuit against the arena with the hopes of playing there in the future.

On October 24, 2013, it was announced that the team had taken out an option on city-owned land in Saco for possibly building a $40 million arena with 5,000 seats as a new home. The team stated, though, that doing so was not the cheapest option for them and that they would prefer to return to Portland.

After obtaining a majority share of the team, former minority owner Ron Cain stated on December 17 that should an agreement with arena trustees not be reached within a month, that he would consider moving the team to the aforementioned Saco land or even out of state if necessary. Continued requests for negotiation were rebuffed by the trustees. Two days later, Cain announced that the team dropped its lawsuit and that arena trustees would resume negotiations, both seeking "to strike a balance between the team's business needs and the arena's financial obligations" according to Cain. The chairman of the trustees stated that he found Cain's comments on the issue "constructive" and he thus was willing to restart talks.

Maine Senate President Justin Alfond, who is from Portland, announced that he submitted emergency legislation to the Maine Legislature to allow the Pirates to receive a share of alcohol revenue, as the original agreement had called for. Cain said that Alfond's efforts did not play a role in their decision on the lawsuit, but could help the team going forward.

On February 4, 2014, arena trustees and the Pirates announced that a five-year lease agreement had been reached and that the team would return to the Cross Insurance Arena for the 2014–15 season and should the team make the 2014 playoffs, it is possible they could return for those games, though Pirates ownership joked that with the team at the bottom of the division that day making such a scenario unlikely. The agreement included the sharing of concessions revenue the Pirates sought, which may or may not have included alcohol sales pending passage of Sen. Alfond's bill. Owner Ron Cain also revealed that he had explored the possibility of moving the team to Glens Falls, New York to replace the departing Adirondack Phantoms, going so far as to send CEO Brian Petrovek to Glens Falls for discussions, but that he wanted the Pirates to remain in Maine too much to do so.

=== Panthers era and final season ===
On March 18, 2015, the Pirates announced an affiliation agreement with the Florida Panthers to begin in the 2015–16 season and that Eric Joyce, the general manager of Florida's previous AHL affiliate, the San Antonio Rampage, would take over the same position in Portland. On May 4, 2016, the Pirates announced it had signed a letter of intent with an outside buyer to sell and relocate the franchise for the 2016–17 season. On May 23, the franchise was relocated to Springfield, Massachusetts, following the sale and relocation of the Springfield Falcons franchise to Tucson, Arizona. On June 15, the franchise's new name was announced as the Springfield Thunderbirds.

A team of investors headed by former Pirates executives W. Godfrey Wood and Brad Church—the latter a former Portland player as well—announced their intentions to put an ECHL team in Portland to fill the void, joining as early as 2017. However, progress to attain a franchise by the Portland group stalled until four groups, none of which involved Wood, submitted their own proposals at the end of February 2017. By March 8, the arena owners had narrowed their choices to the proposals submitted by Spectra and National Sports Services, with both groups having been involved with managing ECHL teams in their past. In June 2017, Comcast Spectacor, the operators of the Cross Insurance Arena and the NHL's Philadelphia Flyers, purchased the franchise rights of the recently dormant Alaska Aces of the ECHL. The league approved of the sale and relocation of the franchise to Portland on June 15.

The market was previously home to:

- Maine Mariners (1977–1992): American Hockey League

The franchise was replaced by:

- Maine Mariners (2018–): ECHL

== Season-by-season results ==
The results from the 23 seasons played by the Portland Pirates.

Calder Cup champions	Conference champions	Division champions	League leader

Regular Season												Playoffs					
Season	Games	Won	Lost	Tied	OTL	SOL	Points	PCT	Goals for	Goals against	Standing	Year	Prelim	1st round	2nd round	3rd round	Finals
1993–94	80	43	27	10	0	—	96	.600	328	269	2nd, North	1994	—	W, 4–1, ALB	W, 4–2, ADK	—	W, 4–2, MNC
1994–95	80	46	22	12	0	—	104	.650	333	233	2nd, North	1995	—	L, 3–4, PRO	—	—	—
1995–96	80	32	34	10	4	—	78	.488	282	283	3rd, North	1996	—	W, 3–1, WOR	W, 4–2, SPR	W, 4–3, SJF	L, 3–4, RCH
1996–97	80	37	26	10	7	—	91	.569	279	264	3rd, New England	1997	—	L, 2–3, SPR	—	—	—
1997–98	80	33	33	12	2	—	80	.500	241	247	3rd, Atlantic	1998	—	W, 3–1, FRD	L, 2–4, SJF	—	—
1998–99	80	23	48	7	2	—	55	.344	214	273	5th, Atlantic	1999	Did not qualify				
1999–00	80	46	23	10	1	—	103	.644	256	202	2nd, New England	2000	—	L, 1–3, WOR	—	—	—
2000–01	80	34	40	4	2	—	74	.463	250	280	5th, New England	2001	—	L, 0–3, SJF	—	—	—
2001–02	80	30	31	15	4	—	79	.494	220	225	4th, North	2002	Did not qualify				
2002–03	80	33	28	13	6	—	85	.531	221	195	4th, North	2003	L, 1–2, MTB	—	—	—	—
2003–04	80	32	27	13	8	—	85	.531	156	160	5th, Atlantic	2004	W, 2–0, PRO	L, 1–4, HWP	—	—	—
2004–05	80	34	34	—	6	6	80	.500	175	242	6th, Atlantic	2005	Did not qualify				
2005–06	80	53	19	—	5	3	114	.713	306	241	1st, Atlantic	2006	—	W, 4–2, PRO	W, 4–2, HWP	L, 3–4, HER	—
2006–07	80	37	31	—	3	9	86	.538	225	232	6th, Atlantic	2007	Did not qualify				
2007–08	80	45	26	—	5	4	99	.619	238	215	3rd, Atlantic	2008	—	W, 4–1, HWP	W, 4–2, PRO	L, 3–4, WBS	—
2008–09	80	39	31	—	3	7	88	.550	249	239	3rd, Atlantic	2009	—	L, 1–4, PRO	—	—	—
2009–10	80	45	24	—	7	4	101	.631	244	214	2nd, Atlantic	2010	—	L, 0–4, MCH	—	—	—
2010–11	80	47	24	—	7	2	103	.644	280	238	1st, Atlantic	2011	—	W, 4–2, CTW	L, 2–4, BNG	—	—
2011–12	76	36	31	—	4	5	81	.533	223	254	3rd, Atlantic	2012	Did not qualify				
2012–13	76	41	30	—	3	2	87	.572	230	233	2nd, Atlantic	2013	—	L, 0–3, SYR	—	—	—
2013–14	76	24	39	—	3	10	61	.401	222	284	5th, Atlantic	2014	Did not qualify				
2014–15	76	39	28	—	7	2	87	.572	203	190	4th, Atlantic	2015	—	L, 2–3, MCH	—	—	—
2015–16	76	41	27	—	6	2	90	.592	215	207	3rd, Atlantic	2016	—	L, 2–3, HER	—	—	—
Totals	1820	870	683	116	95	56	2007	.551	5590	5420			17 playoff appearances, 1 Calder Cup				

== Players ==
=== Team captains ===
- Chris Jensen, 1993–1995
- Jeff Nelson, 1995–1996
- Kent Hulst, 1995–2001
- Terry Yake, 2001–2002
- Dean Melanson, 2001–2003
- Todd Rohloff 2002–2003
- Trent Whitfield, 2003–2005
- Graham Mink, 2003–2004
- Aaron Gavey, 2005–2006
- Shawn Thornton, 2006–2007
- Tyler Bouck, 2007–2009
- Brad Larsen, 2009–2010
- Matt Ellis, 2010–2011
- Dean Arsene, 2011–12
- Alexandre Bolduc, 2012–2013
- Jordan Szwarz, 2013–2014
- Alexandre Bolduc, 2014–2015
- Brent Regner, 2015–2016

=== Pirates Hall of Fame ===
Officially only #50 has been retired by the Portland Pirates. However a banner still hangs in the rafters in tribute to the 5 Maine Mariners who had their number retired before moving to Providence.

- 37 Olaf Kolzig (1993–96) Inducted 1999
- 19 Andrew Brunette (1993–98) Inducted 1999
- 34 Byron Dafoe (1993–95) Inducted 1999
- 32 Kevin 'Killer' Kaminski (1993–95, 1997–98) Inducted 2000
- 3 Steve Poapst (1993–2000) Inducted 2001
- 10 Kent Hulst (1993–96) Inducted 2002
- 30 Martin Brochu (1996–2000) Inducted 2003
- 23 Ryan Mulhern (1995–98, 1999–2000) Inducted 2004
- Head coach Barry Trotz (1993–97) Inducted 2005
- 44 Todd Nelson (1993–95) Inducted 2006
- 31 Jim Carey (1994–96) Inducted 2007
- Owner 50 Tom Ebright (1993–97) Inducted 2008
- 26 Chris Jensen (1993–95) Inducted 2010
- 17 Martin Gendron (1994–96) Inducted 2011
- Broadcaster Tom Caron (1993-95) Inducted 2014

== AHL awards and trophies ==
Calder Cup

- 1993–94

Richard F. Canning Trophy

- 1993–94, 1995–96

Frank Mathers Trophy

- 2005–06

Emile Francis Trophy

- 2005–06
- 2010–11

Harry "Hap" Holmes Memorial Award

- Olaf Kolzig and Byron Dafoe: 1993–94

Louis A. R. Pieri Memorial Award

- Barry Trotz: 1993–94
- Glen Hanlon: 1999–00
- Kevin Dineen: 2005–06

James C. Hendy Memorial Award

- Tom Ebright: 1993–94

Jack A. Butterfield Trophy

- Olaf Kolzig: 1993–94

Eddie Shore Award

- Marc-Andre Gragnani: 2010–11

Dudley "Red" Garrett Memorial Award

- Jim Carey: 1994–95
- Jaroslav Svejkovsky: 1995–96
- Nathan Gerbe: 2008–09
- Tyler Ennis: 2009–10
- Luke Adam: 2010–11

Aldege "Baz" Bastien Memorial Award

- Jim Carey: 1994–95
- Martin Brochu: 1999–00

Les Cunningham Award

- Martin Brochu: 1999–00

Fred T. Hunt Memorial Award

- Kent Hulst: 2000–01
- Chris Ferraro: 2002–03

James H. Ellery Memorial Awards

- Dave Ahlers: 2002–03

== Team records ==
=== Single season ===
Goals: Michel Picard, 41 (1993–94)
Assists: Jeff Nelson, 73 (1993–94)
Points: Jeff Nelson, 107 (1993–94)
Points (By a Defenseman): Marc-Andre Gragnani, 60 (2010–11)
Penalty minutes: Mark Major 355 (1997–98)
GAA: Maxime Ouellet, 1.99 (2003–04)
SV%: Maxime Ouellet, .930 (2003–04)

=== Career ===
Career goals: Kent Hulst, 147 (1993–2001)
Career assists: Andrew Brunette, 224 (1993–98)
Career points: Kent Hulst, 360 (1993–2001)
Career penalty minutes: Kevin Kaminski, 797 (1994–95, 98)
Career goaltending wins: Mike McKenna, 84 (2007–08, 2014–16)
Career shutouts: Maxime Ouellet, 17 (2002–05)
Career games: Kent Hulst, 473 (1993–2001)
