= 2000 World Junior Ice Hockey Championships rosters =

Below are the rosters for teams competing in the 2000 World Junior Ice Hockey Championships.

== Group A ==
=== Czech Republic ===
- Head coach: (Czech Republic) Jaroslav Holík

Pos.	No.	Player	Team	NHL Rights
GK	1	Zdeněk Šmíd	(Czech Republic) HC Becherovka Karlovy Vary	
GK	30	Tomáš Duba	(Czech Republic) HC Sparta Praha	
D	3	Petr Svoboda	(Czech Republic) HC Oceláři Třinec	Toronto Maple Leafs
D	5	David Hájek	(Czech Republic) KLH Chomutov	
D	6	Jiří David	(Czech Republic) HC Barum Continental Zlín	
D	7	Josef Jindra	(Czech Republic) HC České Budějovice	
D	8	Zdeněk Kutlák	(Czech Republic) HC České Budějovice	
D	9	Martin Holý	(Czech Republic) HC Sparta Praha	
D	13	Angel Krstev	(Canada) Lethbridge Hurricanes	
F	10	Tomáš Horna	(Czech Republic) HC Velvana Kladno	
F	14	Milan Kraft	(Canada) Prince Albert Raiders	Pittsburgh Penguins
F	15	Martin Havlát	(Czech Republic) HC Oceláři Třinec	Ottawa Senators
F	16	Zbyněk Irgl	(Czech Republic) HC Vítkovice	
F	18	Vladimír Novák	(Czech Republic) HC Dukla Jihlava	
F	19	Václav Nedorost	(Czech Republic) HC České Budějovice	
F	20	Jan Sochor	(Czech Republic) HC Slavia Praha	Toronto Maple Leafs
F	22	Josef Vašíček	(Canada) Sault Ste. Marie Greyhounds	Carolina Hurricanes
F	24	Jaroslav Kristek	(United States) Tri-City Americans	Buffalo Sabres
F	25	Michal Sivek	(Canada) Prince Albert Raiders	Washington Capitals
F	26	Jaroslav Svoboda	(Canada) Kootenay Ice	Carolina Hurricanes
F	28	Libor Pivko	(Czech Republic) HC Femax Havířov	
F	29	Jan Boháč	(Czech Republic) HC Slavia Praha	

=== Canada ===
- Head coach: (Canada) Claude Julien

Pos.	No.	Player	Team	NHL Rights
GK	1	Brian Finley	(Canada) Barrie Colts	Nashville Predators
GK	30	Maxime Ouellet	(Canada) Quebec Remparts	Philadelphia Flyers
D	2	Matt Kinch	(Canada) Calgary Hitmen	Buffalo Sabres
D	3	Jay Bouwmeester	(Canada) Medicine Hat Tigers	
D	18	Steve McCarthy	(Canada) Kootenay Ice	Chicago Blackhawks
D	20	Barret Jackman	(Canada) Regina Pats	St. Louis Blues
D	21	Joe Rullier	(Canada) Rimouski Océanic	Los Angeles Kings
D	24	Kyle Rossiter	(United States) Spokane Chiefs	Florida Panthers
D	33	Mathieu Biron	(United States) New York Islanders	New York Islanders
F	6	Manny Malhotra	(United States) New York Rangers	New York Rangers
F	7	Éric Chouinard	(Canada) Quebec Remparts	Montreal Canadiens
F	9	Brad Richards	(Canada) Rimouski Océanic	Tampa Bay Lightning
F	10	Chris Nielsen	(Canada) Calgary Hitmen	New York Islanders
F	11	Dany Heatley	(United States) University of Wisconsin	
F	12	Tyler Bouck	(Canada) Prince George Cougars	Dallas Stars
F	16	Mark Bell	(Canada) Ottawa 67's	Chicago Blackhawks
F	19	Jason Spezza	(Canada) Windsor Spitfires	
F	25	Brandon Reid	(Canada) Halifax Mooseheads	
F	26	Matt Pettinger	(Canada) Calgary Hitmen	
F	27	Michael Ryder	(Canada) Hull Olympiques	Montreal Canadiens
F	31	Jamie Lundmark	(Canada) Moose Jaw Warriors	New York Rangers
F	35	Mike Ribeiro	(Canada) Quebec Remparts	Montreal Canadiens

=== United States ===
- Head coach: (United States) Jeff Jackson

Pos.	No.	Player	Team	NHL Rights
GK	29	Rick DiPietro	(United States) Boston University	
GK	30	Philippe Sauvé	(Canada) Drummondville Voltigeurs	Colorado Avalanche
D	2	Ron Hainsey	(United States) University of Massachusetts Lowell	
D	3	Brooks Orpik	(United States) Boston College	
D	4	Jordan Leopold	(United States) University of Minnesota	Mighty Ducks of Anaheim
D	5	Patrick Aufiero	(United States) Boston University	New York Rangers
D	6	Jeff Jillson	(United States) University of Michigan	San Jose Sharks
D	10	Mike Stuart	(United States) Colorado College	
D	22	Doug Janik	(United States) University of Maine	Buffalo Sabres
F	7	Willie Levesque	(United States) Northeastern University	San Jose Sharks
F	8	Brad Winchester	(United States) University of Wisconsin	
F	9	Connor Dunlop	(United States) University of Notre Dame	
F	11	Brett Henning	(United States) University of Notre Dame	New York Islanders
F	15	Dan Cavanaugh	(United States) Boston University	Calgary Flames
F	16	John Sabo	(United States) Boston University	
F	18	Adam Hall	(United States) Michigan State University	Nashville Predators
F	19	Andy Hilbert	(United States) University of Michigan	
F	21	David Inman	(United States) University of Notre Dame	New York Rangers
F	23	Jeff Taffe	(United States) University of Minnesota	
F	25	Patrick Foley	(United States) University of New Hampshire	
F	26	Brett Nowak	(United States) Harvard University	
F	27	Barrett Heisten	(United States) University of Maine	Buffalo Sabres

=== Finland ===
- Head coach: (Finland) Hannu Kapanen

Pos.	No.	Player	Team	NHL Rights
GK	1	Antero Niittymäki	(Finland) HC TPS	Philadelphia Flyers
GK	30	Ari Ahonen	(Finland) HIFK	New Jersey Devils
D	4	Arto Tukio	(Finland) Ilves	
D	6	Tapio Sammalkangas	(Finland) Ilves	
D	7	Mikko Jokela	(Finland) SaiPa	New Jersey Devils
D	8	Tuukka Mäntylä	(Finland) Tappara	
D	9	Ossi Väänänen	(Finland) Jokerit	Phoenix Coyotes
D	12	Arto Laatikainen	(Finland) Espoo Blues	New York Rangers
D	18	Markus Kankaanperä	(Finland) JYP Jyväskylä	Vancouver Canucks
F	13	Ville Hämäläinen	(Finland) SaiPa	
F	14	Teemu Normio	(Finland) Tappara	
F	15	Teemu Laine	(Finland) Jokerit	
F	16	Jari Viuhkola	(Finland) Oulun Kärpät	Chicago Blackhawks
F	17	Mikko Kaukokari	(Finland) Espoo Blues	
F	19	Jani Väänänen	(Finland) KJT Haukat	
F	20	Tomek Valtonen	(Finland) Jokerit	Detroit Red Wings
F	21	Antti Miettinen	(Finland) HPK	
F	22	Jani Rita	(Finland) Jokerit	Edmonton Oilers
F	23	Miikka Lindholm	(Finland) KJT Haukat	
F	24	Riku Hahl	(Finland) HPK	Colorado Avalanche
F	26	Marko Ahosilta	(Finland) KJT Haukat	New Jersey Devils
F	28	Topi Riutta	(Finland) JYP Jyväskylä	

=== Slovakia ===
- Head coach: (Slovakia) Dušan Žiška

Pos.	No.	Player	Team	NHL Rights
GK	1	Karol Križan	(Slovakia) HK 32 Liptovský Mikuláš	
GK	30	Rastislav Staňa	(Canada) Moose Jaw Warriors	Washington Capitals
D	3	Ladislav Harabin	(Slovakia) HC ŠKP Poprad	
D	4	Marek Kolba	(Slovakia) HC ŠKP Poprad	
D	5	Dušan Devečka	(Slovakia) HK 32 Liptovský Mikuláš	
D	6	Vladimír Urban	(Slovakia) HK 32 Liptovský Mikuláš	
D	7	Branislav Mezei	(Canada) Belleville Bulls	New York Islanders
D	8	Kristián Kudroč	(Canada) Quebec Remparts	New York Islanders
D	10	Tomáš Starosta	(Slovakia) HK Dukla Trenčín	
D	12	René Vydarený	(Canada) Rimouski Océanic	Vancouver Canucks
F	14	Branko Radivojevič	(Canada) Belleville Bulls	Colorado Avalanche
F	15	Jozef Mrena	(Canada) Prince George Cougars	
F	16	Ľubomír Pištek	(Canada) Kelowna Rockets	Philadelphia Flyers
F	18	Miroslav Zálešák	(Canada) Drummondville Voltigeurs	San Jose Sharks
F	19	Marcel Hossa	(United States) Portland Winterhawks	
F	20	Martin Cibák	(Canada) Medicine Hat Tigers	Tampa Bay Lightning
F	22	Tomáš Kopecký	(Slovakia) HK Dukla Trenčín	
F	23	Marián Gáborík	(Slovakia) HK Dukla Trenčín	
F	26	Roman Kukumberg	(Slovakia) MHC Nitra	
F	27	Juraj Kolník	(Canada) Rimouski Océanic	New York Islanders
F	28	Milan Bartovič	(Canada) Brandon Wheat Kings	Buffalo Sabres
F	29	Tomáš Surový	(Slovakia) ŠaHK Banská Bystrica	

== Group B ==
=== Russia ===
- Head coach: (Russia) Petr Vorobiev

Pos.	No.	Player	Team	NHL Rights
GK	20	Ilya Bryzgalov	(Russia) HC Lada Togliatti	
GK	30	Alexei Volkov	(Canada) Halifax Mooseheads	Los Angeles Kings
D	2	Alexander Lyubimov	(Russia) CSK VVS Samara	
D	3	Mikhail Balandin	(Russia) Krylya Sovetov Moscow	
D	4	Igor Sсhadilov	(Russia) HC Dynamo Moscow	Washington Capitals
D	6	Kirill Safronov	(Canada) Quebec Remparts	Phoenix Coyotes
D	8	Denis Denisov	(Russia) HC CSKA Moscow	
D	10	Artyom Maryams	(Russia) Torpedo Yaroslavl	
D	22	Alexander Ryazantsev	(Canada) Victoriaville Tigres	Colorado Avalanche
D	23	Andrei Esipov	(Russia) Torpedo Yaroslavl	
F	9	Valeri Khlebnikov	(Russia) Torpedo Yaroslavl	
F	11	Denis Shvidki	(Canada) Barrie Colts	Florida Panthers
F	12	Oleg Smirnov	(Russia) HC Spartak Moscow	Edmonton Oilers
F	13	Sergei Zinovyev	(Russia) Metallurg Novokuznetsk	
F	14	Yevgeni Muratov	(Russia) HC Neftekhimik Nizhnekamsk	
F	15	Alexander Zevakhin	(Russia) HC CSKA Moscow	Pittsburgh Penguins
F	18	Anton But	(Russia) Torpedo Yaroslavl	New Jersey Devils
F	19	Yevgeni Fyodorov	(Russia) Molot-Prikamie Perm	
F	21	Dmitri Afanasenkov	(Canada) Sherbrooke Castors	Tampa Bay Lightning
F	24	Yevgeni Lapin	(Russia) Torpedo Yaroslavl	
F	27	Alexei Tereschenko	(Russia) HC Dynamo Moscow	
F	29	Pavel Duma	(Russia) HC Neftekhimik Nizhnekamsk	

=== Sweden ===
- Head coach: (Sweden) Lars Molin

Pos.	No.	Player	Team	NHL Rights
GK	1	Johan Asplund	(Sweden) Brynäs IF	New York Rangers
GK	30	Jonas Fransson	(Sweden) Tranås AIF	
D	2	Peter Messa	(Sweden) IF Troja/Ljungby	
D	3	Herman Hultgren	(Sweden) Brynäs IF	
D	4	Niklas Kronwall	(Sweden) Djurgårdens IF	
D	5	Erik Lewerström	(Sweden) Grums IK	Phoenix Coyotes
D	8	Christian Bäckman	(Sweden) Västra Frölunda HC	St. Louis Blues
D	10	Viktor Wallin	(Sweden) HV71	Mighty Ducks of Anaheim
D	22	Magnus Hedlund	(Sweden) Mora IK	
D	24	Jonas Frögren	(Sweden) Bofors IK	Calgary Flames
F	11	Henrik Zetterberg	(Sweden) Timrå IK	Detroit Red Wings
F	12	Daniel Sedin	(Sweden) Modo Hockey	Vancouver Canucks
F	14	Kenneth Bergqvist	(Sweden) Brynäs IF	
F	15	Gabriel Karlsson	(Sweden) HV71	Dallas Stars
F	16	Per Hallin	(Sweden) Södertälje SK	
F	19	Christian Berglund	(Sweden) Färjestad BK	New Jersey Devils
F	20	Henrik Sedin	(Sweden) Modo Hockey	Vancouver Canucks
F	21	Björn Melin	(Sweden) HV71	New York Islanders
F	23	Tony Mårtensson	(Sweden) Wings HC Arlanda	
F	26	Jimmie Ölvestad	(Sweden) Djurgårdens IF	Tampa Bay Lightning
F	28	David Nyström	(Sweden) IF Troja/Ljungby	Philadelphia Flyers
F	29	Rickard Wallin	(Sweden) IF Troja/Ljungby	Phoenix Coyotes

=== Switzerland ===
- Head coach: (Switzerland) Jakob Kölliker

Pos.	No.	Player	Team	NHL Rights
GK	20	Simon Züger	(Switzerland) GCK Lions	
GK	30	Pasquale Sievert	(Switzerland) HC Lugano	
D	3	Timo Helbling	(Switzerland) HC Davos	Nashville Predators
D	5	Mathias Wüst	(Switzerland) EHC Kloten	
D	6	David Jobin	(Switzerland) SC Bern	
D	9	Reto Kobach	(Switzerland) EV Zug	
D	11	Martin Höhener	(Switzerland) EHC Kloten	
D	13	Goran Bezina	(Switzerland) HC Fribourg-Gottéron	Phoenix Coyotes
D	15	Fabian Stephan	(Switzerland) SC Bern	
F	4	Flavien Conne	(Switzerland) HC Fribourg-Gottéron	
F	12	Mark Heberlein	(Switzerland) HC Davos	
F	16	Luca Cereda	(Switzerland) HC Ambrì-Piotta	Toronto Maple Leafs
F	17	Björn Christen	(Switzerland) SC Bern	
F	18	Marc Reichert	(Switzerland) SC Bern	
F	19	Paolo Duca	(Switzerland) HC Ambrì-Piotta	
F	23	Marcel Sommer	(Switzerland) SC Rapperswil-Jona	
F	24	Stefan Niggli	(Switzerland) EV Zug	
F	25	Loïc Burkhalter	(Switzerland) SC Rapperswil-Jona	
F	26	Andre Bielmann	(Switzerland) EHC Kloten	
F	27	Sven Helfenstein	(Switzerland) EHC Kloten	
F	28	Silvan Lüssy	(Switzerland) GCK Lions	
F	29	Adrian Wichser	(Switzerland) EHC Kloten	Florida Panthers

=== Kazakhstan ===
- Head coach: (Kazakhstan) Vasily Vasilchenko

Pos.	No.	Player	Team	NHL Rights
GK	1	Yevgeni Cherepanov	(Kazakhstan) Kazzinc-Torpedo	
GK	20	Alexander Kolyuzhny	(Kazakhstan) Kazzinc-Torpedo	
D	2	Roman Rylsky	(Kazakhstan) Kazzinc-Torpedo	
D	3	Yevgeni Ivanov	(Kazakhstan) Kazzinc-Torpedo	
D	4	Vladimir Logvin	(Kazakhstan) Kazzinc-Torpedo	
D	5	Alexei Litvinenko	(Russia) HC Dynamo Moscow	Phoenix Coyotes
D	7	Pavel Yakovlev	(Russia) Amur Khabarovsk	
D	8	Alexei Vasilchenko	(Kazakhstan) Kazzinc-Torpedo	
D	9	Pavel Serdyukov	(Russia) Rubin Tyumen	
D	18	Yevgeni Mazunin	(Kazakhstan) Kazzinc-Torpedo	
F	11	Mikhail Yuriev	(Kazakhstan) Kazzinc-Torpedo	
F	12	Yevgeni Tanygin	(Kazakhstan) Kazzinc-Torpedo	
F	13	Sergei Chebotarevsky	(Kazakhstan) Kazzinc-Torpedo	
F	14	Yevgeni Petrukhin	(Kazakhstan) Kazzinc-Torpedo	
F	16	Roman Azanov	(Russia) Severstal Cherepovets	
F	17	Alexander Golts	(Russia) HC Sibir Novosibirsk	
F	21	Alexander Krevsun	(Russia) HC Lada Togliatti	Nashville Predators
F	22	Vadim Sozinov	(Russia) Kristall Saratov	
F	23	Rustam Yesirkenov	(Kazakhstan) Kazzinc-Torpedo	
F	26	Alexei Rodionov	(Kazakhstan) Kazzinc-Torpedo	
F	27	Inar Uteyev	(Kazakhstan) Kazzinc-Torpedo	
F	30	Ivan Tuyembayev	(Russia) Dinamo-Energija Yekaterinburg	

=== Ukraine ===
- Head coach: (Ukraine) Olexander Kulikov

Pos.	No.	Player	Team	NHL Rights
GK	1	Vadim Seliverstov	(Ukraine) Sokil Kyiv	
GK	22	Vitali Lebed	(Ukraine) Sokil Kyiv	
D	2	Denis Isayenko	(Ukraine) HC Berkut	
D	3	Yevgeni Piszarenko	(Romania) Steaua Rangers	
D	4	Yevgeni Yemelyanenko	(Ukraine) Ldinka Kyiv	
D	5	Sergei Mudryi	(Ukraine) HC Berkut	
D	6	Olexander Skorokhod	(Ukraine) HC Berkut	
D	9	Alexander Pobedonostsev	(Ukraine) Ldinka Kyiv	
D	10	Vasili Gorbenko	(Ukraine) HC Berkut	
D	23	Roman Sherbatyuk	(Ukraine) Sokil Kyiv	
F	8	Yevgeni Sidorov	(Ukraine) HC Berkut	
F	12	Artyom Bondaryev	(Ukraine) Ldinka Kyiv	
F	13	Olexander Khmyl	(Ukraine) Sokil Kyiv	
F	14	Andrei Butochnov	(Ukraine) Sokil Kyiv	
F	15	Oleg Shafarenko	(Ukraine) Sokil Kyiv	
F	16	Olexander Panchenko	(Ukraine) Ldinka Kyiv	
F	17	Artyom Gnidenko	(Ukraine) HC Berkut	
F	18	Dmitri Yudenko	(Ukraine) Ldinka Kyiv	
F	21	Pavel Shtefan	(Canada) Windsor Spitfires	
F	25	Olexander Yanchenko	(Ukraine) Ldinka Kyiv	
F	26	Denis Zabludovsky	(Ukraine) Ldinka Kyiv	
F	28	Olexander Materukhin	(Canada) Acadie-Bathurst Titan	
