= Yesipov =

Yesipov is a surname. Notable people with the surname include:

- Valery Yesipov (born 1971), Soviet footballer
- Valery Yesipov (born 1950), Russian historian and Shalamov scholar, who lives in Vologda
- Vladimir Yesipov, Russian conductor
- Matvey Yesipov, Russian theater artist

== See also ==
- Andrei Esipov (born 1980), Russian ice hockey player
