= 2000 World Junior Ice Hockey Championships =

2000 IIHF World U20 Championship

Tournament details
- Host country: Sweden
- Venues: 2 (in 2 host cities)
- Dates: December 25, 1999 – January 4, 2000
- Teams: 10

Final positions
- Champions: Czech Republic (1st title)
- Runners-up: Russia
- Third place: Canada
- Fourth place: United States

Tournament statistics
- Games played: 35
- Goals scored: 218 (6.23 per game)
- Attendance: 41,693 (1,191 per game)
- Scoring leader: (Sweden) Henrik Sedin (13 points)

The 2000 World Junior Hockey Championships (2000 WJHC), was the 24th edition of the Ice Hockey World Junior Championship. The tournament was hosted in Skellefteå and Umeå, Sweden from December 25, 1999, to January 4, 2000. The Czech Republic won the gold medal with a 1–0 shootout victory over Russia in the championship game, while Canada won the bronze medal with a 4–3 shootout victory over the United States. This still remains as the only tournament to where both medal games have been decided in a shootout.

The playoff round was (again) expanded to eight teams, with group leaders not getting a bye to the semifinals.

== Venues ==
Skellefteå Kraft Arena Capacity: 6,000	Umeå Arena Capacity: 6,000
Sweden – Skellefteå	Sweden – Umeå

== Pool A ==
=== Preliminary round ===
==== Group A ====
Pos	Team	Pld	W	D	L	GF	GA	GD	Pts	Qualification
1	Czech Republic	4	2	2	0	12	7	+5	6	Quarterfinals
2	Canada	4	2	2	0	9	5	+4	6	Quarterfinals
3	United States	4	1	2	1	5	6	−1	4	Quarterfinals
4	Finland	4	1	1	2	8	9	−1	3	Quarterfinals
5	Slovakia	4	0	1	3	4	11	−7	1	Relegation round

Source: IIHF.com at the Wayback Machine

All times local (CET/UTC+1).

December 25, 1999; 15:30	Czech Republic	5–2 (1–1, 1–0, 3–1)	Slovakia	Skellefteå; Attendance: 1,185

December 25, 1999; 19:30	Finland	2–3 (0–1, 0–2, 2–0)	Canada	Skellefteå; Attendance: 457

Antero Niittymäki
Goalies
Maxime Ouellet

	0-1	16:02 - Nielsen (Reid) (SH)
	0-2	21:58 - Chouinard (Lundmark)
	0-3	28:45 - Pettinger (Richards)
Miettinen (Rita) - 48:42	1-3
Miettinen (Rita) - 52:21	2-3

33
Shots
24

December 26, 1999; 15:30	Czech Republic	2–2 (0–1, 1–1, 1–0)	United States	Skellefteå; Attendance: 374

December 26, 1999; 19:30	Slovakia	1–1 (0–0, 1–0, 0–1)	Finland	Skellefteå; Attendance: 398

December 28, 1999; 15:30	Slovakia	0–1 (0–0, 0–0, 0–1)	United States	Skellefteå; Attendance: 472

December 28, 1999; 19:30	Canada	1–1 (1–0, 0–1, 0–0)	Czech Republic	Skellefteå; Attendance: 997

Maxime Ouellet	Goalies	Zdeněk Šmíd
Reid (Heatley) - 12:08 / 1-0; / 1-1 / 22:21 - Havlát (Vašíček)
23	Shots	35

December 29, 1999; 15:30	United States	1–3 (0–1, 0–1, 1–1)	Finland	Skellefteå; Attendance: 582

December 29, 1999; 19:30	Canada	4–1 (3–0, 0–1, 1–0)	Slovakia	Skellefteå; Attendance: 513

Maxime Ouellet
Goalies
Rastislav Staňa

Nielsen (Malhotra) - 7:01	1-0
Richards (Lundmark, Reid) (PP) - 15:07	2-0
Lundmark (PS) - 19:57	3-0
	3-1	31:38 - Gáborík (Kopecký)
Lundmark (Reid) - 54:44	4-1

34
Shots
36

December 31, 1999; 12:00	Finland	2–4 (0–0, 1–1, 1–3)	Czech Republic	Skellefteå; Attendance: 423

December 31, 1999; 16:00	United States	1–1 (0–0, 0–1, 1–0)	Canada	Skellefteå; Attendance: 596

Philippe Sauvé	Goalies	Maxime Ouellet
/ 0-1 / 23:00 - Chouinard (McCarthy, Ribeiro) (PP); Taffe (Nowak, Hainsey) (PP) - 52:05 / 1-1
26	Shots	29

==== Group B ====
Pos	Team	Pld	W	D	L	GF	GA	GD	Pts	Qualification
1	Russia	4	4	0	0	30	4	+26	8	Quarterfinals
2	Sweden	4	3	0	1	27	8	+19	6	Quarterfinals
3	Switzerland	4	2	0	2	13	16	−3	4	Quarterfinals
4	Kazakhstan	4	1	0	3	7	34	−27	2	Quarterfinals
5	Ukraine	4	0	0	4	6	21	−15	0	Relegation round

Source: IIHF.com at the Wayback Machine

All times local (CET/UTC+1).

December 25, 1999; 15:30	Switzerland	6–2 (2–1, 3–0, 1–1)	Ukraine	Umeå; Attendance: 934

December 25, 1999; 19:30	Russia	14–1 (4–1, 4–0, 6–0)	Kazakhstan	Umeå; Attendance: 848

December 26, 1999; 15:30	Switzerland	1–7 (1–1, 0–2, 0–4)	Sweden	Umeå; Attendance: 2,838

December 26, 1999; 19:30	Ukraine	1–4 (0–0, 0–2, 1–2)	Russia	Umeå; Attendance: 489

December 28, 1999; 15:30	Ukraine	1–6 (0–3, 0–1, 1–2)	Sweden	Umeå; Attendance: 2,058

December 28, 1999; 19:30	Kazakhstan	0–5 (0–4, 0–0, 0–1)	Switzerland	Umeå; Attendance: 839

December 29, 1999; 15:30	Sweden	1–5 (0–2, 0–2, 1–1)	Russia	Umeå; Attendance: 4,450

December 29, 1999; 19:30	Kazakhstan	5–2 (1–0, 1–0, 3–2)	Ukraine	Umeå; Attendance: 356

December 31, 1999; 12:00	Russia	7–1 (1–0, 3–0, 3–1)	Switzerland	Umeå; Attendance: 329

December 31, 1999; 16:00	Sweden	13–1 (3–1, 6–0, 4–0)	Kazakhstan	Umeå; Attendance: 511

=== Relegation round ===
January 2, 2000; 16:00	Slovakia	1–3 (0–1, 0–1, 1–1)	Ukraine	Skellefteå; Attendance: 2,745

January 4, 2000; 12:00	Ukraine	1–5 (0–0, 1–2, 0–3)	Slovakia	Umeå; Attendance: 301

==== 10-minute tie-break game ====
January 4, 2000; 14:15	Ukraine	0 – 1 GWS (0–0, 0/3–2/3)	Slovakia	Umeå; Attendance: 301

Ukraine was relegated to Division I for the 2001 World Junior Ice Hockey Championships.

=== Final round ===
Quarterfinals
B1	Russia	4
A4	Finland	0
A2	Canada	8
B3	Switzerland	3
B2	Sweden	1
A3	United States	5
A1	Czech Republic	6
B4	Kazakhstan	3

Semifinals
B1	Russia	3
A2	Canada	2
A3	United States	1
A1	Czech Republic	4

Gold medal game
B1	Russia	0
A1	Czech Republic	1^{‡}
Bronze medal game
A2	Canada	4^{‡}
A3	United States	3

‡ Shootout victory.

All times local (CET/UTC+1).

==== Quarterfinals ====
January 1, 2000; 14:00	Canada	8–3 (3–0, 4–2, 1–1)	Switzerland	Skellefteå; Attendance: 432

Maxime Ouellet
Goalies
Simon Züger, Pasquale Sievert (0:25 second)

Reid (Lundmark) - 1:04	1-0
Chouinard (Bouck, Reid) - 11:46	2-0
Ryder - 13:01	3-0
	3-1	23:28 - Wichser (Christen)
	3-2	25:54 - Wichser (Helfenstein)
Bell - 26:20	4-2
Bouck (Malhotra - 30:25	5-2
Reid (Spezza) - 34:27	6-2
Pettinger (Spezza) - 39:57	7-2
	7-3	Cereda (SH) - 43:06
Bell (Heatley, Ryder) (PP) - 58:59	8-3

29
Shots
31

January 1, 2000; 14:00	Sweden	1–5 (1–1, 0–1, 0–3)	United States	Umeå; Attendance: 2,171

January 1, 2000; 18:00	Czech Republic	6–3 (3–0, 2–3, 1–0)	Kazakhstan	Skellefteå; Attendance: 386

January 1, 2000; 18:00	Russia	4–0 (3–0, 1–0, 0–0)	Finland	Umeå; Attendance: 521

==== Consolation round ====
January 3, 2000; 15:30	Switzerland	5–2 (1–0, 3–1, 1–1)	Finland	Umeå; Attendance: 359

January 3, 2000; 19:30	Kazakhstan	2–12 (0–3, 1–7, 1–2)	Sweden	Umeå; Attendance: 946

==== Semifinals ====
January 3, 2000; 15:30	United States	1–4 (0–1, 0–2, 1–1)	Czech Republic	Skellefteå; Attendance: 2,848

January 3, 2000; 19:30	Russia	3–2 (0–0, 2–1, 1–1)	Canada	Skellefteå; Attendance: 3,215

Alexei Volkov
Goalies
Maxime Ouellet

Khlebnikov (But) - 25:41	1-0
Smirnov (Tereschenko) (SH) - 30:40	2-0
	2-1	37:02 - Heatley (Reid)
Zinovyev (Tereschenko, Smirnov) - 47:21	3-1
	3-2	57:50 - Pettinger (McCarthy)

20
Shots
25

==== 7th place game ====
January 4, 2000; 15:00	Finland	9–1 (3–0, 2–0, 4–1)	Kazakhstan	Umeå; Attendance: 306

==== 5th place game ====
January 4, 2000; 19:00	Sweden	5–2 (1–2, 2–0, 2–0)	Switzerland	Umeå; Attendance: 872

==== Bronze medal game ====
January 4, 2000; 14:00	(bronze) Canada	4 – 3 GWS (0–1, 1–1, 2–1) (OT: 0–0) (SO: 3–1)	United States	Skellefteå; Attendance: 2,784

Brian Finley
Goalies
Philippe Sauvé

	0-1	10:03 - Levesque (SH)
	0-2	24:28 - Cavanaugh (Taffe, Orpik)
Pettinger (Ryder, Jackman) - 27:36	1-2
Nielsen (Bouck) - 48:28	2-2
Heatley (Reid) (PP) - 52:04	3-2
	3-3	57:06 - Leopold (Taffe) (PP)

Lundmark
Reid
Heatley
Chouinard (miss)
Shootout
(miss) Hilbert
Aufiero
(miss) Taffe
(miss) Cavanaugh

37
Shots
38

==== Gold medal game ====
January 4, 2000; 19:00	(silver) Russia	0 – 1 GWS (0–0, 0–0, 0–0, 0–0, 1/3–2/3)	Czech Republic (gold)	Skellefteå; Attendance: 3,857

=== Scoring leaders ===
Rank	Player	Country	Pos	GP	G	A	Pts	PIM	+/−
1	Henrik Sedin	Sweden	F	7	4	9	13	6	+9
2	Milan Kraft	Czech Republic	F	7	5	7	12	0	+8
3	Daniel Sedin	Sweden	F	7	6	4	10	0	+8
4	Brandon Reid	Canada	F	7	4	5	9	4	+3
5	Evgueni Mouratov	Russia	F	7	6	2	8	4	+8
6	Alexei Tereschenko	Russia	F	7	3	5	8	2	+6
7	Erik Lewerström	Sweden	D	7	3	5	8	14	+2
8	Alexandre Riazentsev	Russia	D	7	2	6	8	2	+10
9	David Nyström	Sweden	F	7	2	6	8	2	+6
10	Oleg Smirnov	Russia	F	7	2	6	8	2	+7

=== Goaltending leaders ===
Minimum 40% of team's ice time.

Rank	Player	Country	TOI	SOG	GA	GAA	Saves	Sv %	SO
1	Ilya Bryzgalov	Russia	234:04	105	3	0.77	102	97.14	1
2	Alexei Volkov	Russia	185:11	81	4	1.30	77	95.06	0
3	Zdeněk Šmíd	Czech Republic	420:00	182	11	1.57	171	93.96	1
4	Maxime Ouellet	Canada	360:00	181	11	1.83	170	93.92	0
5	Rick DiPietro	United States	298:57	138	9	1.81	129	93.48	1

=== Tournament awards ===
	Goaltender	Defencemen		Forwards		
IIHF Directorate Awards	(United States) Rick DiPietro	(Russia) Alexander Ryazantsev		(Czech Republic) Milan Kraft		
Media All-Star Team	(United States) Rick DiPietro	(Canada) Mathieu Biron	(Russia) Alexander Ryazantsev	(Czech Republic) Milan Kraft	(Russia) Evgeny Muratov	(Russia) Alexei Tereschenko

=== Final standings ===
	Team
1st place, gold medalist(s)	Czech Republic
2nd place, silver medalist(s)	Russia
3rd place, bronze medalist(s)	Canada
4	United States
5	Sweden
6	Switzerland
7	Finland
8	Kazakhstan
9	Slovakia
10	Ukraine

== Pool B ==
The Pool B tournament was played in Minsk, Belarus between December 13 and December 19, 1999.

=== Preliminary round ===
==== Group A ====
Pos	Team	Pld	W	D	L	GF	GA	GD	Pts	Qualification
1	Belarus	3	2	1	0	7	3	+4	5	Final round
2	Germany	3	2	0	1	9	6	+3	4	Final round
3	Italy	3	1	1	1	4	5	−1	3	Relegation round
4	Latvia	3	0	0	3	2	8	−6	0	Relegation round

Source: IIHF.com at the Wayback Machine

Germany	4–2	Italy

Belarus	3–1	Latvia

Germany	3–0	Latvia

Belarus	0–0	Italy

Italy	2–1	Latvia

Belarus	4–2	Germany

==== Group B ====
Pos	Team	Pld	W	D	L	GF	GA	GD	Pts	Qualification
1	France	3	2	1	0	11	8	+3	5	Final round
2	Norway	3	2	0	1	14	8	+6	4	Final round
3	Poland	3	1	1	1	13	12	+1	3	Relegation round
4	Denmark	3	0	0	3	10	20	−10	0	Relegation round

Source: IIHF.com at the Wayback Machine

France	4–3	Denmark

Norway	5–1	Poland

Norway	7–3	Denmark

France	3–3	Poland

Poland	9–4	Denmark

France	4–2	Norway

=== Final round ===
Pos	Team	Pld	W	D	L	GF	GA	GD	Pts	Promotion
1	Belarus	3	3	0	0	17	9	+8	6	Promoted to the 2001 Top Division
2	Germany	3	2	0	1	8	5	+3	4	
3	France	3	1	0	2	8	15	−7	2	
4	Norway	3	0	0	3	6	10	−4	0	

Source: IIHF.com at the Wayback Machine

Carried forward from	France	4–2	Norway

preliminary round	Belarus	4–2	Germany

Germany	4–0	France

Belarus	4–3	Norway

Germany	2–1	Norway

Belarus	9–4	France

Belarus was promoted to the Top Division for the 2001 World Junior Ice Hockey Championships.

=== Relegation round ===
Pos	Team	Pld	W	D	L	GF	GA	GD	Pts	Relegation
5	Poland	3	2	1	0	13	7	+6	5	
6	Italy	3	1	1	1	4	6	−2	3	
7	Latvia	3	1	0	2	7	8	−1	2	
8	Denmark	3	1	0	2	11	14	−3	2	Relegated to the 2001 Division II

Source: IIHF.com at the Wayback Machine

Carried forward from	Poland	9–4	Denmark

preliminary round	Italy	2–1	Latvia

Poland	3–2	Latvia

Denmark	4–1	Italy

Italy	1–1	Poland

Latvia	4–3	Denmark

Denmark was relegated to Division II for the 2001 World Junior Ice Hockey Championships.

== Pool C ==
The Pool C tournament was played in Nagano, Japan between December 30, 1999, and January 3, 2000.

=== Preliminary round ===
==== Group A ====
Pos	Team	Pld	W	D	L	GF	GA	GD	Pts	Qualification
1	Austria	3	3	0	0	31	5	+26	6	1st place game
2	Hungary	3	2	0	1	14	18	−4	4	3rd place game
3	Estonia	3	0	1	2	10	19	−9	1	5th place game
4	Yugoslavia	3	0	1	2	7	20	−13	1	7th place game

Source: IIHF.com at the Wayback Machine

Austria	8–2	Estonia

Hungary	6–1	Yugoslavia

Hungary	6–3	Estonia

Austria	9–1	Yugoslavia

Yugoslavia	5–5	Estonia

Austria	14–2	Hungary

==== Group B ====
Pos	Team	Pld	W	D	L	GF	GA	GD	Pts	Qualification
1	Slovenia	3	2	1	0	12	7	+5	5	1st place game
2	Great Britain	3	1	2	0	9	7	+2	4	3rd place game
3	Japan	3	1	1	1	11	9	+2	3	5th place game
4	Lithuania	3	0	0	3	6	15	−9	0	7th place game

Source: IIHF.com at the Wayback Machine

Slovenia	5–1	Lithuania

Japan	2–2	Great Britain

Slovenia	3–3	Great Britain

Japan	6–3	Lithuania

Great Britain	4–2	Lithuania

Slovenia	4–3	Japan

=== Final round ===
All times local (JST/UTC+9).

==== 7th place game ====
January 3, 2000; 10:00	Lithuania	5–1 (3–1, 1–0, 1–0)	Yugoslavia	Big Hat; Attendance: 315

Yugoslavia was relegated to Division III for the 2001 World Junior Ice Hockey Championships.

==== 5th place game ====
January 3, 2000; 13:00	Japan	9–1 (2–0, 0–1, 7–0)	Estonia	Big Hat; Attendance: 911

==== 3rd place game ====
January 3, 2000; 16:00	Hungary	2–7 (1–4, 1–2, 0–1)	Great Britain	Big Hat; Attendance: 676

==== 1st place game ====
January 3, 2000; 19:00	Slovenia	2–6 (0–1, 0–1, 2–4)	Austria	Big Hat; Attendance: 733

Austria was promoted to Division I for the 2001 World Junior Ice Hockey Championships.

== Pool D ==
The Pool D tournament was played in Mexico City, Mexico between January 9 and January 15, 2000.

=== Preliminary round ===
==== Group A ====
Pos	Team	Pld	W	D	L	GF	GA	GD	Pts	Qualification	Croatia men's national junior ice hockey team	South Africa men's national junior ice hockey team	Bulgaria men's national junior ice hockey team
1	Croatia	2	2	0	0	35	2	+33	4	1st–3rd place group		13–1	22–1
2	South Africa	2	1	0	1	13	14	−1	2	4th–6th place group	1–13		12–1
3	Bulgaria	2	0	0	2	2	34	−32	0	7th–9th place group	1–22	1–12	

Source: IIHF.com at the Wayback Machine

==== Group B ====
Pos	Team	Pld	W	D	L	GF	GA	GD	Pts	Qualification	Netherlands men's national junior ice hockey team	Mexico men's national junior ice hockey team	Iceland men's national junior ice hockey team
1	Netherlands	2	2	0	0	24	1	+23	4	1st–3rd place group		10–0	14–1
2	Mexico	2	1	0	1	8	13	−5	2	4th–6th place group	0–10		8–3
3	Iceland	2	0	0	2	4	22	−18	0	7th–9th place group	1–14	3–8	

Source: IIHF.com at the Wayback Machine

==== Group C ====
Pos	Team	Pld	W	D	L	GF	GA	GD	Pts	Qualification	Romania men's national junior ice hockey team	Spain men's national junior ice hockey team	Australia men's national junior ice hockey team
1	Romania	2	2	0	0	24	5	+19	4	1st–3rd place group		6–3	18–2
2	Spain	2	1	0	1	8	9	−1	2	4th–6th place group	3–6		5–3
3	Australia	2	0	0	2	5	23	−18	0	7th–9th place group	2–18	3–5	

Source: IIHF.com at the Wayback Machine

=== Final round ===
==== 1st–3rd place group ====
Pos	Team	Pld	W	D	L	GF	GA	GD	Pts	Promotion	Croatia men's national junior ice hockey team	Romania men's national junior ice hockey team	Netherlands men's national junior ice hockey team
1	Croatia	2	2	0	0	12	8	+4	4	Promoted to the 2001 Division II		6–4	6–4
2	Romania	2	1	0	1	9	8	+1	2		4–6		5–2
3	Netherlands	2	0	0	2	6	11	−5	0		4–6	2–5	

Source: IIHF.com at the Wayback Machine

Croatia was promoted to Division II for the 2001 World Junior Ice Hockey Championships.

==== 4th–6th place group ====
Pos	Team	Pld	W	D	L	GF	GA	GD	Pts	Spain men's national junior ice hockey team	Mexico men's national junior ice hockey team	South Africa men's national junior ice hockey team
4	Spain	2	2	0	0	16	6	+10	4		10–2	6–4
5	Mexico	2	1	0	1	5	11	−6	2	2–10		3–1
6	South Africa	2	0	0	2	5	9	−4	0	4–6	1–3	

Source: IIHF.com at the Wayback Machine

==== 7th–9th place group ====
Pos	Team	Pld	W	D	L	GF	GA	GD	Pts	Relegation	Australia men's national junior ice hockey team	Bulgaria men's national junior ice hockey team	Iceland men's national junior ice hockey team
7	Australia	2	2	0	0	16	6	+10	4			8–2	8–4
8	Bulgaria	2	1	0	1	9	9	0	2		2–8		7–1
9	Iceland	2	0	0	2	5	15	−10	0	Relegated to the 2001 Division III Qualification	4–8	1–7	

Source: IIHF.com at the Wayback Machine

Iceland was relegated to Division III Qualification for the 2001 World Junior Ice Hockey Championships.
