= David Hájek =

Czech ice hockey player

- Born: March 22, 1980 (age 46) Chomutov, Czechoslovakia
- Height: 6 ft 3 in (191 cm)
- Weight: 205 lb (93 kg; 14 st 9 lb)
- Position: Defence
- Shot: Left
- Played for: HC Kladno; HC Karlovy Vary; HC Slovan Bratislava; Orli Znojmo
- NHL draft: 239th overall, 2000; Calgary Flames
- Playing career: 1999–2017

David Hájek (born June 13, 1980) is a Czech former professional ice hockey defenceman.

Hájek played in the Czech Extraliga for HC Kladno and HC Karlovy Vary. He also played in the Tipsport Liga for HC Slovan Bratislava and the Erste Bank Eishockey Liga for Orli Znojmo.

Hájek was drafted 239th overall by the Calgary Flames in the 2000 NHL entry draft.

== Career statistics ==
=== Regular season and playoffs ===
			Regular season					Playoffs
Season	Team	League	GP	G	A	Pts	PIM	GP	G	A	Pts	PIM
1996–97	KLH Chomutov	CZE U20	4	0	0	0		—	—	—	—	—
1997–98	KLH Chomutov	CZE U20	34	3	9	12		—	—	—	—	—
1998–99	KLH Chomutov	CZE U20	35	4	12	16		—	—	—	—	—
1998–99	Melville Millionaires	SJHL	26	7	19	26	26	—	—	—	—	—
1998–99	Spokane Chiefs	WHL	27	0	3	3	10	—	—	—	—	—
1999–2000	KLH Chomutov	CZE.2 U20	6	1	5	6	14	1	0	0	0	0
1999–2000	KLH Chomutov	CZE.2	28	1	5	6	14	12	1	3	4	10
2000–01	HC Vagnerplast Kladno	ELH	40	1	1	2	66	—	—	—	—	—
2000–01	KLH Chomutov	CZE.2	9	0	2	2	4	9	2	5	7	10
2001–02	HC Vagnerplast Kladno	ELH	48	0	7	7	16	—	—	—	—	—
2002–03	HC Vagnerplast Kladno	CZE.2	4	0	0	0	0	—	—	—	—	—
2002–03	HC VČE Hradec Králové, a.s.	CZE.2	4	0	2	2	4	—	—	—	—	—
2003–04	HC Energie Karlovy Vary	ELH	33	2	5	7	6	—	—	—	—	—
2003–04	KLH Chomutov	CZE.2	13	1	3	4	12	—	—	—	—	—
2004–05	KLH Chomutov	CZE.2	45	11	17	28	68	10	0	4	4	8
2005–06	HC Rabat Kladno	ELH	35	2	4	6	20	—	—	—	—	—
2005–06	HC Slovan Ústečtí Lvi	CZE.2	8	2	2	4	4	11	0	3	3	10
2006–07	HC GEUS OKNA Kladno	ELH	45	0	0	0	18	3	0	0	0	0
2007–08	HC GEUS OKNA Kladno	ELH	51	4	4	8	26	9	2	2	4	6
2008–09	HC GEUS OKNA Kladno	ELH	50	5	16	21	44	10	1	1	2	6
2009–10	HC Energie Karlovy Vary	ELH	25	1	5	6	20	—	—	—	—	—
2009–10	KLH Chomutov	CZE.2	13	3	3	6	2	14	1	1	2	6
2010–11	HC Energie Karlovy Vary	ELH	8	0	0	0	2	—	—	—	—	—
2010–11	SK Kadaň	CZE.2	8	0	2	2	10	—	—	—	—	—
2010–11	HC Slovan Bratislava	SVK	29	2	6	8	12	7	0	6	6	12
2011–12	Orli Znojmo	AUT	44	1	10	11	30	4	0	0	0	0
2012–13	Dresdner Eislöwen	GER.2	48	5	15	20	60	—	—	—	—	—
2013–14	Dresdner Eislöwen	DEL2	42	3	22	25	42	5	0	0	0	0
2014–15	EC Bad Nauheim	DEL2	12	2	5	7	14	—	—	—	—	—
2014–15	Löwen Frankfurt	DEL2	16	2	6	8	4	5	0	0	0	4
2015–16	Heilbronner Falken	DEL2	28	3	1	4	47	—	—	—	—	—
2016–17	Blue Devils Weiden	GER.3	33	5	12	17	39	4	0	2	2	0
ELH totals			335	15	42	57	218	12	2	2	4	6
CZE.2 totals			132	18	36	54	118	56	4	16	20	44
GER.2 & DEL2 totals			146	15	49	64	167	10	0	0	0	4

=== International ===
Year	Team	Event	GP	G	A	Pts	PIM
1998	Czech Republic	EJC	6	0	1	1	0
2000	Czech Republic	WJC	7	1	2	3	6
Junior totals			13	1	3	4	6
