= Alexander Riazantsev =

Alexander Riazantsev may refer to:

- Aleksandr Ryazantsev (born 1986), Russian footballer
- Alexander Riazantsev (ice hockey) (born 1980), Russian ice hockey player
- Alexander Riazantsev (chess player) (born 1985), Russian chess Grandmaster
