= Jozef Mrena =

Slovak ice hockey player

- Born: May 2, 1980 (age 44)
- Height: 6 ft 2 in (188 cm)
- Weight: 192 lb (87 kg; 13 st 10 lb)
- Position: Center
- Shot: Left
- Played for: HC Slovan Bratislava; HK 36 Skalica; SHK 37 Piestany; HK Trnava; HK 95 Povazska Bystrica; HK Dukla Trencin
- National team: Slovakia
- Playing career: 2000–2006

Jozef Mrena is a Slovak professional ice hockey center who played with HC Slovan Bratislava in the Slovak Extraliga.

== Career statistics ==
			Regular season					Playoffs
Season	Team	League	GP	G	A	Pts	PIM	GP	G	A	Pts	PIM
1998–99	Prince George Cougars	WHL	65	15	26	41	18	7	1	2	3	4
1999–00	Prince George Cougars	WHL	58	17	27	44	28	10	1	1	2	6
2000–01	HC Slovan Bratislava	Slovak	54	11	19	30	32	—	—	—	—	—
2001–02	HC Slovan Bratislava	Slovak	44	3	6	9	20	19	3	2	5	0
2002–03	HC Slovan Bratislava	Slovak	54	5	15	20	14	12	0	1	1	0
2003–04	HK 36 Skalica	Slovak	37	5	9	14	12	5	0	0	0	0
2003–04	HC Slovan Bratislava	Slovak	16	2	2	4	6	—	—	—	—	—
2004–05	HK 36 Skalica	Slovak	45	10	9	19	18	—	—	—	—	—
2005–06	SHK 37 Piestany	Slovak2	3	1	1	2	10	7	0	5	5	2
2005–06	HK Trnava	Slovak2	10	2	3	5	6	—	—	—	—	—
2005–06	HK 95 Povazska Bystrica	Slovak2	16	5	4	9	8	—	—	—	—	—
2005–06	HK Dukla Trencin	Slovak	2	0	0	0	0	—	—	—	—	—
Slovak totals			252	36	60	96	102	36	3	3	6	0
