= Josef Jindra =

Czech ice hockey player

- Born: June 12, 1980 (age 44); České Budějovice, Czechoslovakia
- Height: 6 ft 2 in (188 cm)
- Weight: 187 lb (85 kg; 13 st 5 lb)
- Position: Defence
- Shoots: Left
- Czech Extraliga team: BK Mladá Boleslav
- Playing career: 1999–present

Josef Jindra (born June 12, 1980) is a Czech professional ice hockey defenceman. He played with BK Mladá Boleslav in the Czech Extraliga during the 2010–11 Czech Extraliga season.

== Career statistics ==
			Regular season					Playoffs
Season	Team	League	GP	G	A	Pts	PIM	GP	G	A	Pts	PIM
1996–97	Motor Ceske Budejovice U18	Czech U18	44	4	7	11	—	—	—	—	—	—
1997–98	HC Ceske Budejovice U20	Czech U20	40	2	5	7	—	—	—	—	—	—
1998–99	Motor Ceske Budejovice U20	Czech U20	25	6	8	14	—	—	—	—	—	—
1998–99	HC Ceske Budejovice	Czech	1	0	0	0	0	—	—	—	—	—
1998–99	KLH Vajgar Jindřichův Hradec	Czech2	32	2	5	7	—	—	—	—	—	—
1999–00	HC Ceske Budejovice U20	Czech U20	14	1	5	6	16	—	—	—	—	—
1999–00	HC Ceske Budejovice	Czech	12	0	0	0	6	—	—	—	—	—
1999–00	KLH Vajgar Jindřichův Hradec	Czech2	21	2	4	6	8	—	—	—	—	—
2000–01	HC Ceske Budejovice U20	Czech U20	5	1	2	3	8	6	1	2	3	10
2000–01	HC Ceske Budejovice	Czech	39	1	4	5	16	—	—	—	—	—
2000–01	IHC Písek	Czech2	4	0	0	0	0	—	—	—	—	—
2000–01	KLH Vajgar Jindřichův Hradec	Czech3	3	0	0	0	2	2	0	0	0	0
2001–02	HC Ceske Budejovice	Czech	38	1	5	6	78	—	—	—	—	—
2001–02	IHC Písek	Czech2	7	0	1	1	4	—	—	—	—	—
2002–03	HC Ceske Budejovice	Czech	38	1	3	4	32	4	0	0	0	4
2003–04	HC Ceske Budejovice	Czech	47	3	6	9	65	—	—	—	—	—
2004–05	HC Ceske Budejovice	Czech2	42	2	4	6	44	—	—	—	—	—
2004–05	Vsetinska Hokejova	Czech	1	0	0	0	2	—	—	—	—	—
2005–06	HC Ceske Budejovice	Czech	20	0	0	0	43	—	—	—	—	—
2005–06	KLH Vajgar Jindřichův Hradec	Czech2	4	1	2	3	2	—	—	—	—	—
2005–06	BK Mladá Boleslav	Czech2	9	0	1	1	4	11	2	2	4	29
2006–07	HC Ceske Budejovice	Czech	1	0	0	0	2	—	—	—	—	—
2006–07	HK Jestrabi Prostejov	Czech2	10	3	1	4	22	—	—	—	—	—
2006–07	BK Mladá Boleslav	Czech2	40	3	9	12	50	8	1	0	1	20
2007–08	BK Mladá Boleslav	Czech2	36	7	20	27	38	9	0	0	0	10
2008–09	BK Mladá Boleslav	Czech	42	0	1	1	38	—	—	—	—	—
2009–10	BK Mladá Boleslav	Czech	34	0	1	1	16	—	—	—	—	—
2009–10	HC Tábor	Czech2	7	0	1	1	8	—	—	—	—	—
2010–11	BK Mladá Boleslav	Czech	34	2	2	4	68	—	—	—	—	—
2011–12	BK Mladá Boleslav	Czech	13	0	1	1	8	—	—	—	—	—
2011–12	HKM Zvolen	Slovak	12	1	1	2	2	10	0	2	2	18
2012–13	BK Mladá Boleslav	Czech2	52	3	7	10	44	10	1	2	3	6
2013–14	BK Mladá Boleslav	Czech2	45	1	7	8	30	7	0	1	1	8
2014–15	MsHK Žilina	Slovak	6	0	1	1	27	—	—	—	—	—
2014–15	KLH Vajgar Jindřichův Hradec	Czech3	9	2	1	3	4	—	—	—	—	—
2015–16	HC Ds Ceske Budejovice	Czech4	18	5	16	21	—	—	—	—	—	—
Czech totals			320	8	23	31	374	—	—	—	—	—
Czech2 totals			309	24	62	86	254	58	4	9	13	81
