= Lars-Fredrik Nyström =

Swedish ice hockey player

Lars-Fredrik Nyström (born August 10, 1949) is a retired Swedish ice hockey player. He started his professional career in Skellefteå AIK where he played until 1977 when he joined Djurgårdens IF. He ended his playing career after the 1981–82 season in the same club. During the following season Nyström became assistant coach to head coach Gunnar Svensson. When Svensson was fired January 21, 1986, Nyström along with former Djurgården player and team captain Håkan Eriksson coached Djurgården for the rest of the 1985–86 season. He later became head coach for Rögle BK.

== Career statistics ==
			Regular Season					Playoffs
Season	Team	League	GP	G	A	Pts	PIM	GP	G	A	Pts	PIM
1968–69	Skellefteå AIK	Division 1	14	1	1	2	15	—	—	—	—	—
1970–71	Skellefteå AIK	Division 1	20	1	4	5	18	—	—	—	—	—
1971–72	Skellefteå AIK	Division 1	20	1	4	5	18	—	—	—	—	—
1972–73	Skellefteå AIK	Division 1	20	5	2	7	8	—	—	—	—	—
1974–75	Skellefteå AIK	Division 1	30	8	4	12	33	—	—	—	—	—
1975–76	Skellefteå AIK	Elitserien	32	6	4	10	24	4	0	1	1	2
1976–77	Skellefteå AIK	Elitserien	31	3	7	10	20	—	—	—	—	—
1977–78	Djurgårdens IF	Elitserien	22	1	1	2	14	—	—	—	—	—
1978–79	Djurgårdens IF	Elitserien	32	4	2	6	18	6	1	1	2	12
1979–80	Djurgårdens IF	Elitserien	36	6	2	8	22	—	—	—	—	—
1980–81	Djurgårdens IF	Elitserien	19	2	0	2	10	—	—	—	—	—
1981–82	Djurgårdens IF	Elitserien	18	3	1	4	14	—	—	—	—	—
1981–82	Djurgårdens IF	Kvalserien	5	0	1	1	0	—	—	—	—	—
