= Sven Helfenstein =

Swiss ice hockey player

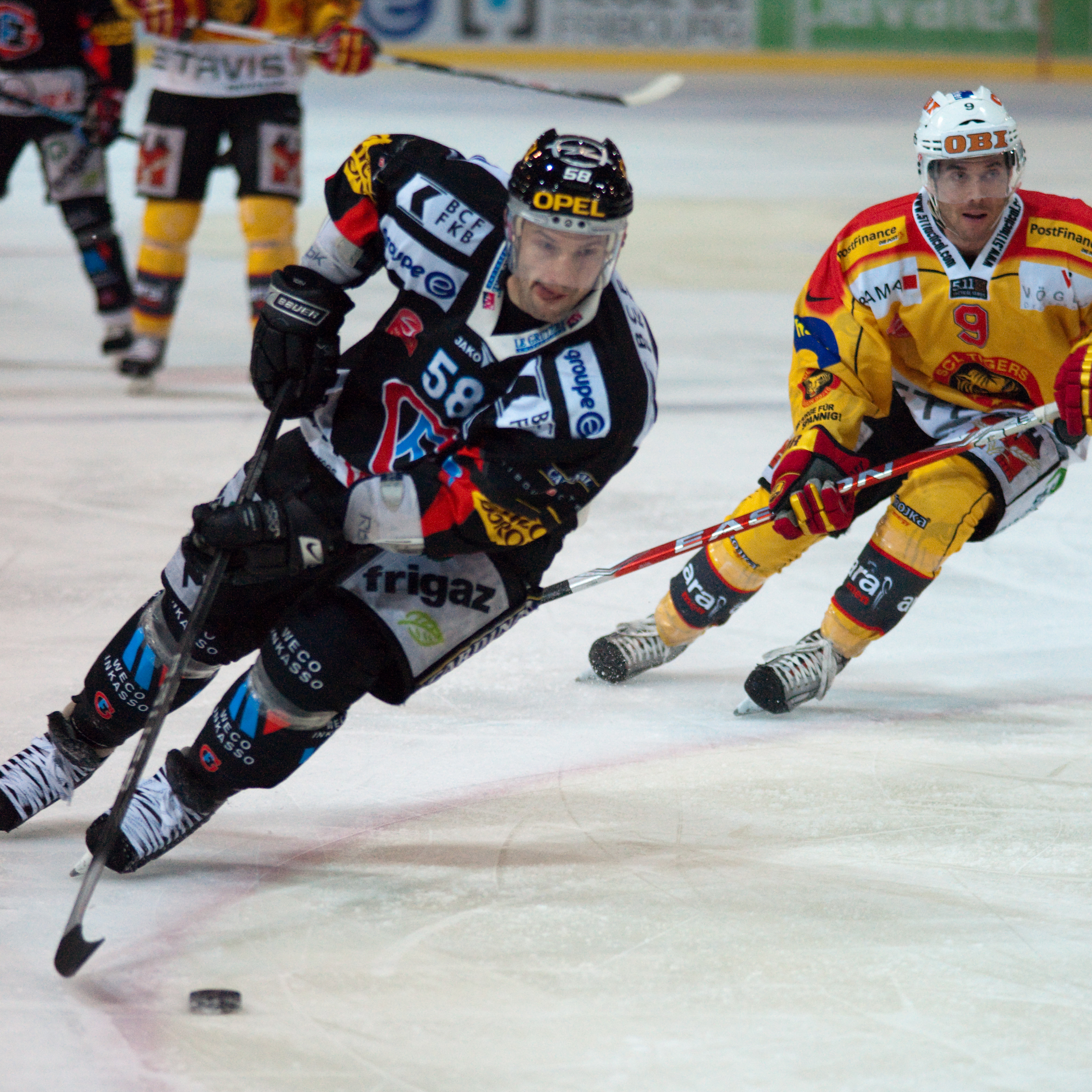
- Sandy Jeannin (L), Gottéron-Langnau, 15.01.2010
- Born: July 30, 1982 (age 43) Winterthur, Switzerland
- Height: 5 ft 10 in (178 cm)
- Weight: 176 lb (80 kg; 12 st 8 lb)
- Position: Forward
- Shot: Right
- NLA team Former teams: Lausanne HC; Kloten Flyers; HC La Chaux-de-Fonds; SC Bern; ZSC Lions; Rapperswil-Jona Lakers; HC Davos; SCL Tigers
- NHL draft: 175th overall, 2000; New York Rangers
- Playing career: 1999–2013

Sven Helfenstein (born July 30, 1982) is a Swiss former professional ice hockey player. Helfenstein was selected by the New York Rangers in the 6th round (175th overall) of the 2000 NHL entry draft.

Helfenstein made his National League A debut playing with Kloten Flyers during the 1998–99 NLA season. After helping his club Lausanne HC achieve promotion from the National League B in the 2012-2013 Season he retired. He is now a player agent and expert on Swiss TV Channel MySports(UPC).

== Career statistics ==
=== Regular season and playoffs ===
			Regular season					Playoffs
Season	Team	League	GP	G	A	Pts	PIM	GP	G	A	Pts	PIM
1997–98	EHC Kloten	SUI U20	31	6	8	14	14	—	—	—	—	—
1998–99	EHC Kloten	SUI U20	33	25	18	43	14	7	5	3	8	2
1998–99	EHC Kloten	NDA	2	0	0	0	0	—	—	—	—	—
1998–99	EHC Bülach	SUI.3
1999–2000	EHC Kloten	SUI U20	2	0	0	0	4	3	0	0	0	0
1999–2000	EHC Kloten	NLA	40	6	3	9	28	6	0	1	1	0
2000–01	EHC Kloten	SUI U20	2	3	3	6	0	—	—	—	—	—
2000–01	Kloten Flyers	NLA	8	1	1	2	0	—	—	—	—	—
2000–01	HC Thurgau	SUI.2	4	2	1	3	8	—	—	—	—	—
2000–01	HC La Chaux–de–Fonds	NLA	23	2	8	10	6	—	—	—	—	—
2001–02	SC Bern	NLA	35	2	10	12	39	6	0	0	0	4
2001–02	SC Bern	SUI U20	—	—	—	—	—	4	4	2	6	2
2002–03	SC Bern	NLA	32	2	3	5	14	—	—	—	—	—
2002–03	EHC Biel	SUI.2	11	3	4	7	12	—	—	—	—	—
2003–04	ZSC Lions	NLA	38	5	7	12	6	13	2	1	3	6
2003–04	GCK Lions	SUI.2	9	4	7	11	2	—	—	—	—	—
2004–05	ZSC Lions	NLA	38	8	8	16	16	15	2	2	4	2
2004–05	GCK Lions	SUI.2	1	2	3	5	0	—	—	—	—	—
2005–06	ZSC Lions	NLA	40	11	4	15	30	—	—	—	—	—
2006–07	ZSC Lions	NLA	31	3	2	5	22	5	0	0	0	2
2006–07	GCK Lions	SUI.2	4	4	4	8	6	—	—	—	—	—
2007–08	Rapperswil–Jona Lakers	NLA	29	3	6	9	10	—	—	—	—	—
2007–08	HC Davos	NLA	16	4	5	9	2	12	1	2	3	4
2008–09	HC Davos	NLA	23	1	5	6	35	—	—	—	—	—
2008–09	SCL Tigers	NLA	7	3	3	6	2	—	—	—	—	—
2009–10	SCL Tigers	NLA	44	8	20	28	32	—	—	—	—	—
2010–11	SCL Tigers	NLA	35	2	11	13	8	1	0	0	0	0
2011–12	Lausanne HC	SUI.2	34	14	18	32	40	11	4	3	7	24
2012–13	Lausanne HC	SUI.2	25	6	9	15	12	12	2	3	5	2
NDA/NLA totals			441	61	96	157	250	58	5	6	11	18

=== International ===
Year	Team	Event	GP	G	A	Pts	PIM
1999	Switzerland	WJC18	7	1	5	6	0
2000	Switzerland	WJC	7	2	4	6	2
2000	Switzerland	WJC18	7	5	6	11	2
2001	Switzerland	WJC	7	2	1	3	4
2002	Switzerland	WJC	7	1	2	3	2
Junior totals			35	11	18	29	10
