= Zdeněk Šmíd =

Czech ice hockey player

- Born: February 3, 1980 (age 46) Plzeň, Czechoslovakia
- Height: 5 ft 10 in (178 cm)
- Weight: 168 lb (76 kg; 12 st 0 lb)
- Position: Goaltender
- Caught: Right
- Played for: Czech Extraliga; HC Karlovy Vary; Bílí Tygři Liberec; HC Plzeň; HC Slavia Praha; HC Sparta Praha; 1. liga SK Kadaň; IHC Pisek; SM-liiga; HPK; Swedish Hockey League; Luleå HF
- NHL draft: 168th overall, 2000; Atlanta Thrashers
- Playing career: 1998–2005

Zdeněk Šmíd (born February 3, 1980) is a Czech former professional ice hockey goaltender. He played mostly in his home country, with appearances in both the top and second-level Czech hockey leagues. Šmíd also appeared in both the Finnish SM-liiga - 18 games with HPK - and the Swedish Hockey League - one game with Luleå HF - during the 2001–02 season. He was the starting goalie for the Czech team that won the 2000 World Junior Ice Hockey Championships.

Šmíd was selected by the Atlanta Thrashers in the 6th round (168th overall) of the 2000 NHL entry draft, but opted to remain in the Czech championship longer.

He retired at the early age of 26 following long struggles with injury, and has ever since started working on his father's construction company.
