= Eric Chouinard =

American-Canadian ice hockey player (born 1980)

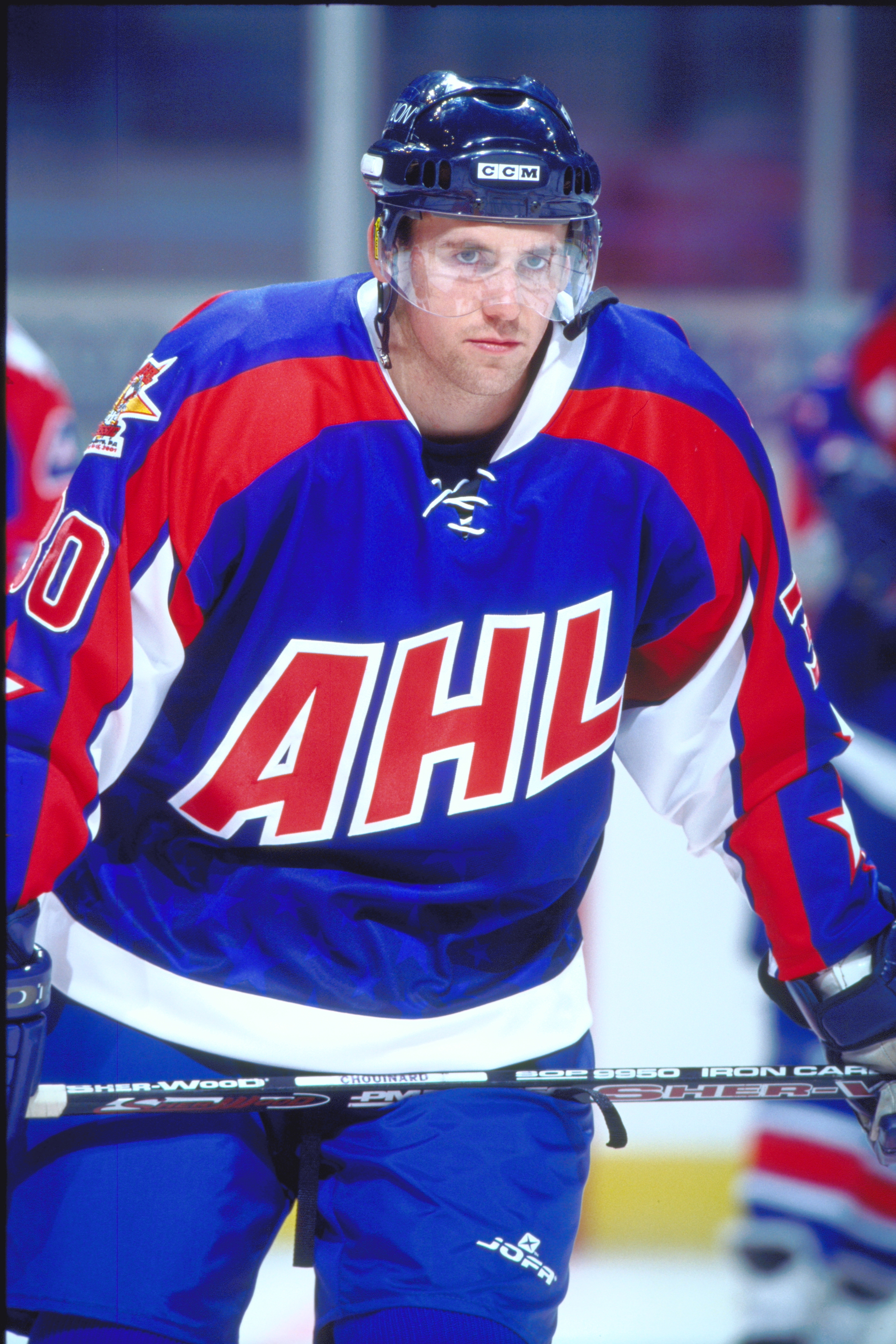
- Born: July 8, 1980 (age 45) Atlanta, Georgia, U.S.
- Height: 6 ft 2 in (188 cm)
- Weight: 218 lb (99 kg; 15 st 8 lb)
- Position: Center
- Shot: Left
- Played for: Montreal Canadiens; Philadelphia Flyers; Minnesota Wild; Straubing Tigers; Thomas Sabo Ice Tigers; Dinamo Minsk; Vålerenga Ishockey; Brûleurs de Loups
- NHL draft: 16th overall, 1998; Montreal Canadiens
- Playing career: 2000–2018

Eric Guy Chouinard (born July 8, 1980) is an American-born Canadian former professional ice hockey player who played in the National Hockey League (NHL) with the Montreal Canadiens, Philadelphia Flyers and Minnesota Wild.

== Playing career ==
Chouinard was born in Atlanta during his father's days with the Atlanta Flames, but raised in both Calgary, Alberta and St. Louis, Missouri, before his family settled in Cap-Rouge, Quebec, following the end of his father’s playing career. As a youth, he played in the 1993 Quebec International Pee-Wee Hockey Tournament with a minor ice hockey team from Sherbrooke.

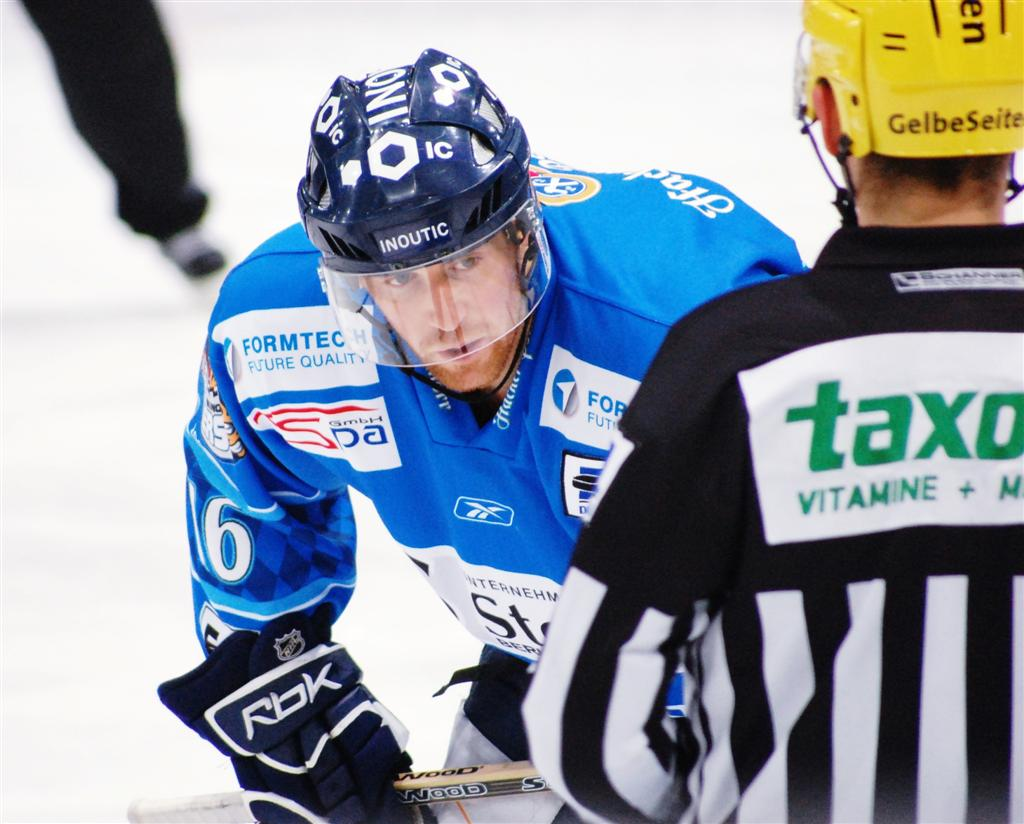

Chouinard has played for Team Canada in international competition despite getting offers to play for Team USA. After scoring 296 points in 180 games with the Quebec Remparts of the Quebec Major Junior Hockey League, he became a 1st-round draft choice (16th overall) by the Montreal Canadiens in the 1998 NHL entry draft. Since then, he has also played for the Philadelphia Flyers and the Minnesota Wild, where he played alongside his cousin, Marc Chouinard, during the 2003–04 season.

In 2006–2007, Chouinard played four games in Switzerland for HC Sierre-Anniviers. He received an offer to play for the Straubing Tigers of the German DEL where he played until January 19, 2009 when he was suspended by the team.

On September 2, 2009 Chouinard signed a contract with the Nurnberg Ice Tigers of the Deutsche Eishockey Liga. On January 15, 2011, he signed a new two-year contract extension with the Ice Tigers that will take him through the 2012–2013 season.

Approaching his final professional years, Chouinard played three seasons with Brûleurs de Loups of the French Ligue Magnus before ending his career by returning to Germany for a single season in 2017–18 with the Bayreuth Tigers of the DEL2.

== Personal life ==
Chouinard is the son of former Atlanta Flames star Guy Chouinard, and the cousin of Marc Chouinard.

== Career statistics ==
=== Regular season and playoffs ===
			Regular season					Playoffs
Season	Team	League	GP	G	A	Pts	PIM	GP	G	A	Pts	PIM
1995–96	Magog Cantonniers	QMAAA	22	12	14	26	12	—	—	—	—	—
1995–96	Sainte-Foy Gouverneurs	QMAAA	17	2	5	7	—	15	7	12	19	12
1996–97	Sainte-Foy Gouverneurs	QMAAA	40	29	41	70	40	10	14	9	23	—
1996–97	Laval Titan Collège Français	QMJHL	1	1	0	1	0	—	—	—	—	—
1997–98	Quebec Remparts	QMJHL	68	41	42	83	18	14	7	10	17	6
1998–99	Quebec Remparts	QMJHL	62	50	59	109	56	13	8	10	18	8
1998–99	Fredericton Canadiens	AHL	—	—	—	—	—	6	3	2	5	0
1999–00	Quebec Remparts	QMJHL	50	57	47	104	105	11	14	4	18	8
2000–01	Montreal Canadiens	NHL	13	1	3	4	0	—	—	—	—	—
2000–01	Quebec Citadelles	AHL	48	12	21	33	6	9	2	0	2	2
2001–02	Quebec Citadelles	AHL	65	19	23	42	18	2	0	0	0	0
2002–03	Utah Grizzlies	AHL	32	12	12	24	16	—	—	—	—	—
2002–03	Philadelphia Flyers	NHL	28	4	4	8	8	—	—	—	—	—
2003–04	Philadelphia Flyers	NHL	17	3	0	3	0	—	—	—	—	—
2003–04	Minnesota Wild	NHL	31	3	4	7	6	—	—	—	—	—
2003–04	Philadelphia Phantoms	AHL	1	0	0	0	0	—	—	—	—	—
2004–05	EC Salzburg	EBEL	16	5	5	10	42	—	—	—	—	—
2005–06	Philadelphia Phantoms	AHL	24	7	7	14	4	—	—	—	—	—
2005–06	Philadelphia Flyers	NHL	1	0	0	0	2	—	—	—	—	—
2005–06	San Antonio Rampage	AHL	47	8	12	20	22	—	—	—	—	—
2006–07	HC Sierre	NLB	4	3	3	6	0	—	—	—	—	—
2006–07	Straubing Tigers	DEL	27	6	17	23	32	—	—	—	—	—
2007–08	Straubing Tigers	DEL	55	30	22	52	58	—	—	—	—	—
2008–09	Straubing Tigers	DEL	41	14	10	33	12	—	—	—	—	—
2009–10	Thomas Sabo Ice Tigers	DEL	45	15	14	29	32	5	2	2	4	4
2010–11	Thomas Sabo Ice Tigers	DEL	52	24	25	49	50	2	0	1	1	2
2011–12	Thomas Sabo Ice Tigers	DEL	34	13	18	31	10	—	—	—	—	—
2012–13	Thomas Sabo Ice Tigers	DEL	52	16	31	47	20	3	0	1	1	0
2013–14	Dinamo Minsk	KHL	8	0	0	0	4	—	—	—	—	—
2013–14	Vålerenga Ishockey	GET	16	7	12	19	2	4	1	3	4	2
2014–15	Brûleurs de Loups	FRA	24	16	15	31	32	5	1	2	3	0
2015–16	Brûleurs de Loups	FRA	26	23	20	43	8	5	1	2	3	0
2016–17	Brûleurs de Loups	FRA	44	23	34	57	30	12	9	6	15	4
2017–18	Bayreuth Tigers	DEL2	27	12	25	37	18	—	—	—	—	—
NHL totals			90	11	11	22	16	—	—	—	—	—
DEL totals			306	118	146	264	214	10	2	4	6	6

Medal record

Representing Canada

Ice hockey

World Junior Championships
Bronze medal – third place	2000 Umeå	

=== International ===
Year	Team	Event	Result	GP	G	A	Pts	PIM
2000	Canada	WJC	3rd place, bronze medalist(s)	7	3	0	3	0
Junior totals				7	3	0	3	0

== Awards and honours ==
Award	Year
QMJHL
CHL/NHL Top Prospects Game	1998
Frank J. Selke Memorial Trophy	1999
AHL
All-Star Game	2001
DEL
All-Star Game	2008

== See also ==
- Notable families in the NHL

Awards and achievements
Preceded by Jason Ward	Montreal Canadiens first-round draft pick 1998	Succeeded by Ron Hainsey
