= David Nyström =

Swedish ice hockey player

- Born: February 21, 1980 (age 46) Stockholm, Sweden
- Height: 6 ft 0 in (183 cm)
- Weight: 187 lb (85 kg; 13 st 5 lb)
- Position: Right wing
- Shot: Right
- Played for: Frölunda HC; IF Troja/Ljungby; Skellefteå AIK; Halmstad HF; Södertälje SK; Vålerenga; Halmstad HF; Frisk Asker
- NHL draft: 224th overall, 1999; Philadelphia Flyers
- Playing career: 1999–2012

David Nyström (born February 21, 1980) is a former Swedish professional ice hockey player who played in the Swedish Hockey League (SHL) and Norwegian GET-ligaen. Nyström was drafted in the eighth round of the 1999 NHL entry draft by the Philadelphia Flyers, but he never played professionally in North America. He spent the first eight seasons of his professional career in Sweden, playing parts of two seasons in the SHL with Frölunda HC and Södertälje SK, and five of his final six seasons in Norway, playing for Vålerenga and Frisk Asker. He is the son of former SHL player and head coach Lars-Fredrik Nyström.
