= Aleksei Volkov (ice hockey) =

Russian ice hockey player

- Born: March 15, 1980 (age 46) Sverdlovsk, Russian SFSR Soviet Union
- Height: 6 ft 1 in (185 cm)
- Weight: 185 lb (84 kg; 13 st 3 lb)
- Position: Goaltender
- Caught: Left
- Played for: Lowell Lock Monsters; Salavat Yulaev Ufa; Dynamo Moscow; Spartak Moscow; HC MVD; Vityaz Chekhov; Atlant Moscow Oblast
- NHL draft: 76th overall, 1998; Los Angeles Kings
- Playing career: 1995–2015

Aleksei Vladimirovich Volkov (Russian: Алексей Владимирович Волков; born March 15, 1980) is a Russian former professional hockey goaltender.

== Career ==
Volkov was drafted in the third round (76th overall) of the 1998 NHL entry draft by the Los Angeles Kings, however never made the National Hockey League (NHL). He played most notably in the Kontinental Hockey League (KHL). He is currently serving as the General manager to Avangard Omsk of the Kontinental Hockey League (KHL).

== Career statistics ==
=== International ===
Year	Team	Event	Place	GP	W	L	T	OT	MIN	GA	SO	GAA	SV%
1998	Russia	EJC	3rd place, bronze medalist(s)	5						9		1.80	.917
1999	Russia	WJC	1st place, gold medalist(s)	7					409	10		1.47	.935
2000	Russia	WJC	2nd place, silver medalist(s)	5					185	4		1.30	.951

Awards and achievements
Preceded by Alexei Tezikov	Winner of the Raymond Lagacé Trophy; 1998–99	Succeeded by Kirill Safronov
