= Dan Cavanaugh =

American ice hockey player

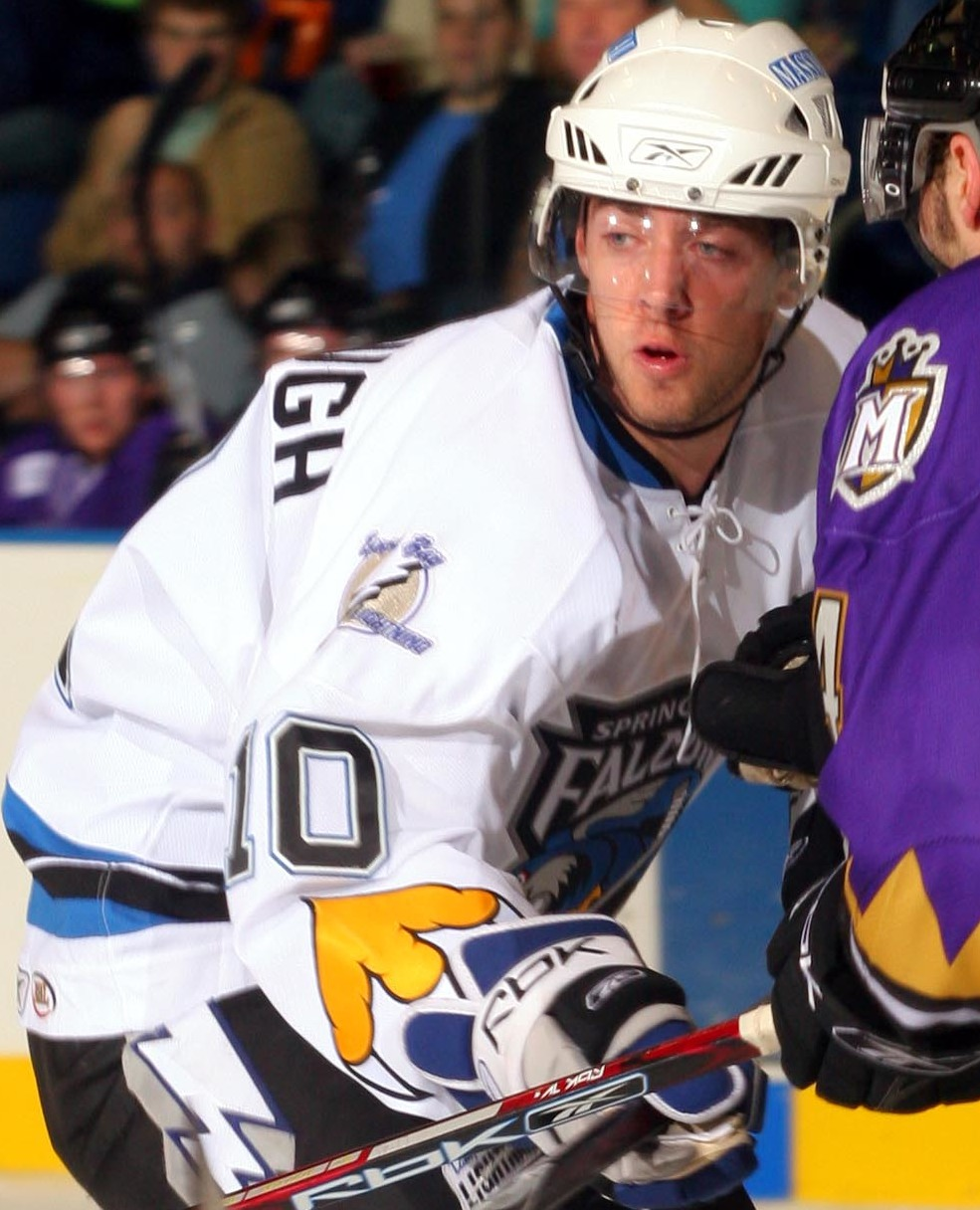
- Cavanaugh with the Springfield Falcons in 2006
- Born: March 3, 1980 (age 46) Springfield, Massachusetts, U.S.
- Height: 6 ft 2 in (188 cm)
- Weight: 195 lb (88 kg; 13 st 13 lb)
- Position: Center
- Shot: Right
- Played for: Houston Aeros; Philadelphia Phantoms; Springfield Falcons
- National team: United States
- NHL draft: 38th overall, 1999; Calgary Flames
- Playing career: 2001–2009

Dan Cavanaugh (born March 3, 1980) is a retired American professional ice hockey player last playing for EC VSV in the Austrian Ice Hockey League.

== Playing career ==
Cavanaugh played for the Boston University Terriers from 1998 to 2001. After college, Cavanaugh was drafted (2nd round; 38th overall) by the Calgary Flames. He was a member of the Houston Aeros from 2001 to 2005, where he helped the team win the Calder Cup in 2003. In 2005, Cavanaugh signed with the Philadelphia Phantoms to start the 2005–06 season. He then played 26 games for the Phantoms before being traded to the Springfield Falcons, where he played through the 2006–07 season. The following season, Cavanaugh left the AHL to play with the SG Pontebba in the Italian Hockey League. Cavanaugh then spent the 2008–09 season with EC VSV in the Austrian Hockey League.

== International ==
Cavanaugh played in the 2000 World Junior Ice Hockey Championships for Team USA.
