= Matt Pettinger =

Canadian ice hockey player

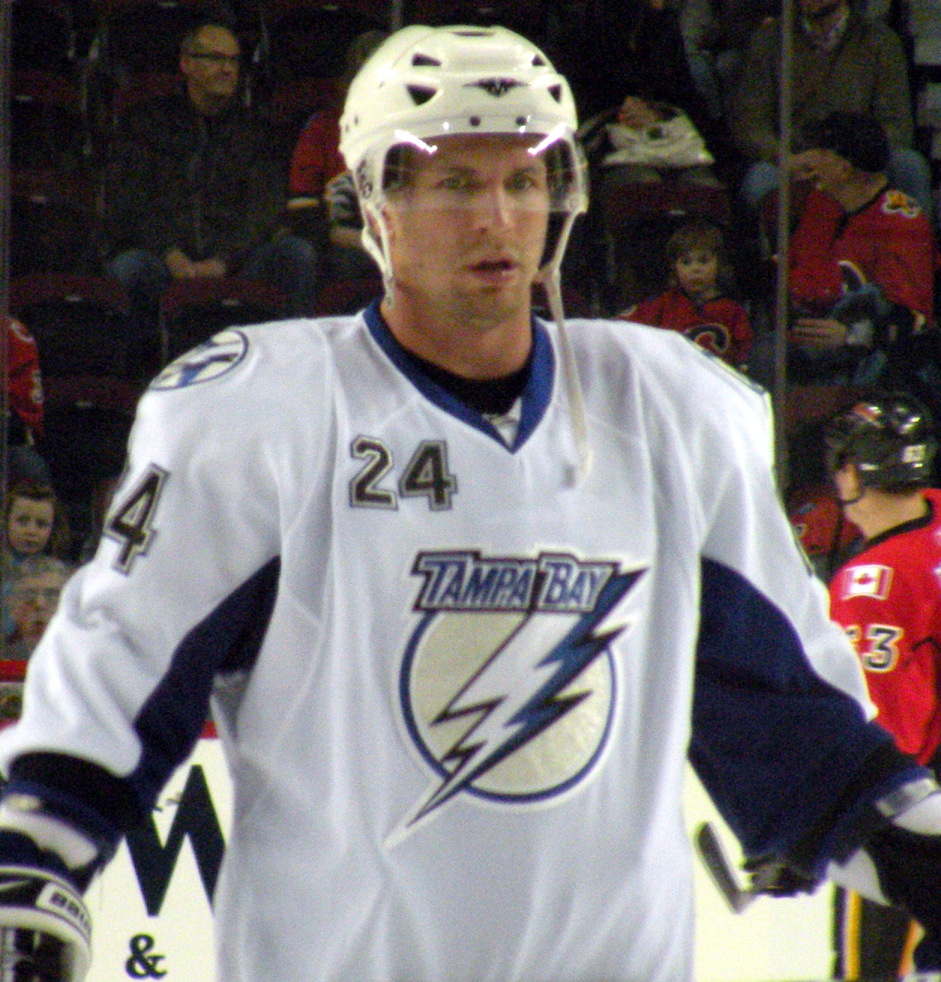
- Born: October 22, 1980 (age 45) Edmonton, Alberta, Canada
- Height: 6 ft 1 in (185 cm)
- Weight: 205 lb (93 kg; 14 st 9 lb)
- Position: Left wing
- Shot: Left
- Played for: Washington Capitals; Vancouver Canucks; Tampa Bay Lightning; Kölner Haie; Hamburg Freezers
- National team: Canada
- NHL draft: 43rd overall, 2000; Washington Capitals
- Playing career: 2000–2015

Matthew Pettinger (born October 22, 1980) is a Canadian former professional ice hockey left winger. He played in the National Hockey League with the Tampa Bay Lightning, Vancouver Canucks and the Washington Capitals. Pettinger was born in Edmonton, Alberta and raised in Victoria, British Columbia.

== Playing career ==
As a youth, Pettinger played in the 1994 Quebec International Pee-Wee Hockey Tournament with a minor ice hockey team from Victoria, British Columbia.

Pettinger was drafted in the 2nd round, 43rd overall, by the Washington Capitals in the 2000 NHL entry draft. Before his professional career, Pettinger played a season and a half for the University of Denver Pioneers before joining the Calgary Hitmen of the Western Hockey League (WHL) midway through the 1999–00 season.

Pettinger spent his first few seasons in the National Hockey League (NHL) splitting time between the Washington Capitals and their American Hockey League (AHL) affiliate, the Portland Pirates, before earning a full-time roster spot with the Capitals in 2003–04. Pettinger played eight games for HDD Olimpija Ljubljana in Slovenia during the 2004–05 NHL lockout, then recorded a career-high 20 goals, 18 assists and 38 points as NHL play resumed the following season.

On February 26, 2008, at the trade deadline, Pettinger was dealt from the Washington Capitals to the Vancouver Canucks for forward Matt Cooke. Beginning the 2008–09 season back in the AHL with the Canucks' minor league affiliate, the Manitoba Moose, Pettinger was claimed on re-entry waivers by the Tampa Bay Lightning on October 21, 2008. He completed the season with 15 points in 59 games with the Lightning.

Unable to sign with an NHL team in the 2009 off-season, Pettinger returned to the Manitoba Moose, signing a professional try-out contract on October 14, 2009. Before long, however, injuries to the Vancouver Canucks resulted in him re-signing with his former NHL club on November 2 to a one-year, two-way deal worth the league-minimum $500,000 at the NHL level. Seven games later, he was sent back to the Moose in expectation of forward Daniel Sedin's return from injury after clearing waivers on November 21. On April 6, 2010 Pettinger was recalled by the Vancouver Canucks. After 422 NHL regular-season games, Pettinger finally made his post-season debut, playing a single game with the Canucks in a 3-2 victory over the Los Angeles Kings in the Western Conference Quarterfinals on April 15, 2010.

On August 6, 2010, Pettinger left North America and signed a one-year contract with German team Kölner Haie of the DEL. After completing a second season with the Sharks, Pettinger opted to remain in the DEL for a third season; however, he signed a one-year deal with the Hamburg Freezers on April 9, 2012.

== Career statistics ==
=== Regular season and playoffs ===
			Regular season					Playoffs
Season	Team	League	GP	G	A	Pts	PIM	GP	G	A	Pts	PIM
1996–97	Victoria Salsa	BCHL	49	22	14	36	31	—	—	—	—	—
1997–98	Victoria Salsa	BCHL	55	20	22	42	56	7	5	1	6	8
1998–99	University of Denver	WCHA	38	6	14	20	52	—	—	—	—	—
1999–2000	University of Denver	WCHA	19	2	6	8	49	—	—	—	—	—
1999–2000	Calgary Hitmen	WHL	27	14	6	20	41	11	2	6	8	30
2000–01	Portland Pirates	AHL	64	19	17	36	92	2	0	0	0	4
2000–01	Washington Capitals	NHL	10	0	0	0	2	—	—	—	—	—
2001–02	Portland Pirates	AHL	9	3	3	6	24	—	—	—	—	—
2001–02	Washington Capitals	NHL	61	7	3	10	44	—	—	—	—	—
2002–03	Portland Pirates	AHL	69	14	13	27	72	3	0	2	2	2
2002–03	Washington Capitals	NHL	1	0	0	0	0	—	—	—	—	—
2003–04	Washington Capitals	NHL	71	7	5	12	37	—	—	—	—	—
2004–05	HDD Olimpija Ljubljana	IEHL	7	2	4	6	41	—	—	—	—	—
2004–05	HDD Olimpija Ljubljana	SVN	1	0	1	1	0	—	—	—	—	—
2005–06	Washington Capitals	NHL	71	20	18	38	39	—	—	—	—	—
2006–07	Washington Capitals	NHL	64	16	16	32	22	—	—	—	—	—
2007–08	Washington Capitals	NHL	56	2	5	7	25	—	—	—	—	—
2007–08	Vancouver Canucks	NHL	20	4	2	6	11	—	—	—	—	—
2008–09	Manitoba Moose	AHL	2	3	0	3	0	—	—	—	—	—
2008–09	Tampa Bay Lightning	NHL	59	8	7	15	24	—	—	—	—	—
2009–10	Manitoba Moose	AHL	54	14	16	30	31	—	—	—	—	—
2009–10	Vancouver Canucks	NHL	9	1	2	3	6	1	0	0	0	0
2010–11	Kölner Haie	DEL	44	14	31	45	32	5	1	2	3	2
2011–12	Kölner Haie	DEL	52	14	23	37	40	6	2	4	6	6
2012–13	Hamburg Freezers	DEL	49	9	20	29	42	6	1	3	4	2
2013–14	Hamburg Freezers	DEL	47	12	16	28	18	12	3	1	4	4
2014–15	Hamburg Freezers	DEL	38	8	11	19	32	7	2	0	2	0
AHL totals			198	53	49	102	219	5	0	2	2	6
NHL totals			422	65	58	123	210	1	0	0	0	0
DEL totals			230	57	101	158	164	36	9	10	19	14

=== International ===
Medal record

Representing Canada

Ice hockey

World Junior Championships
Silver medal – second place	1999 Winnipeg	
Bronze medal – third place	2000 Umea	

Year	Team	Event	Result	GP	G	A	Pts	PIM
1997	Canada Western	U17	4th	4	2	1	3	4
1999	Canada	WJC	2nd place, silver medalist(s)	2	1	0	1	2
2000	Canada	WJC	3rd place, bronze medalist(s)	7	4	0	4	4
2006	Canada	WC	4th	8	1	0	1	4
Junior totals				13	7	1	8	10
Senior totals				8	1	0	1	4
