= Marek Kolba =

Slovak ice hockey player

- Born: January 14, 1980 (age 45); Poprad, Czechoslovakia
- Height: 6 ft 1 in (185 cm)
- Weight: 192 lb (87 kg; 13 st 10 lb)
- Position: Defence
- Shoots: Left
- Slovak team Former teams: HK Dukla Michalovce; HK Poprad; HC Slovan Bratislava; HC Havířov; MsHK Žilina; MHC Martin; HC ’05 Banská Bystrica; HC Košice; Ducs de Dijon
- NHL draft: Undrafted
- Playing career: 2000–present

Marek Kolba (born January 14, 1980) is a Slovak ice hockey player who is currently playing for the HK Dukla Michalovce in the Tipsport Liga.
