= Teemu Normio =

Finnish ice hockey player

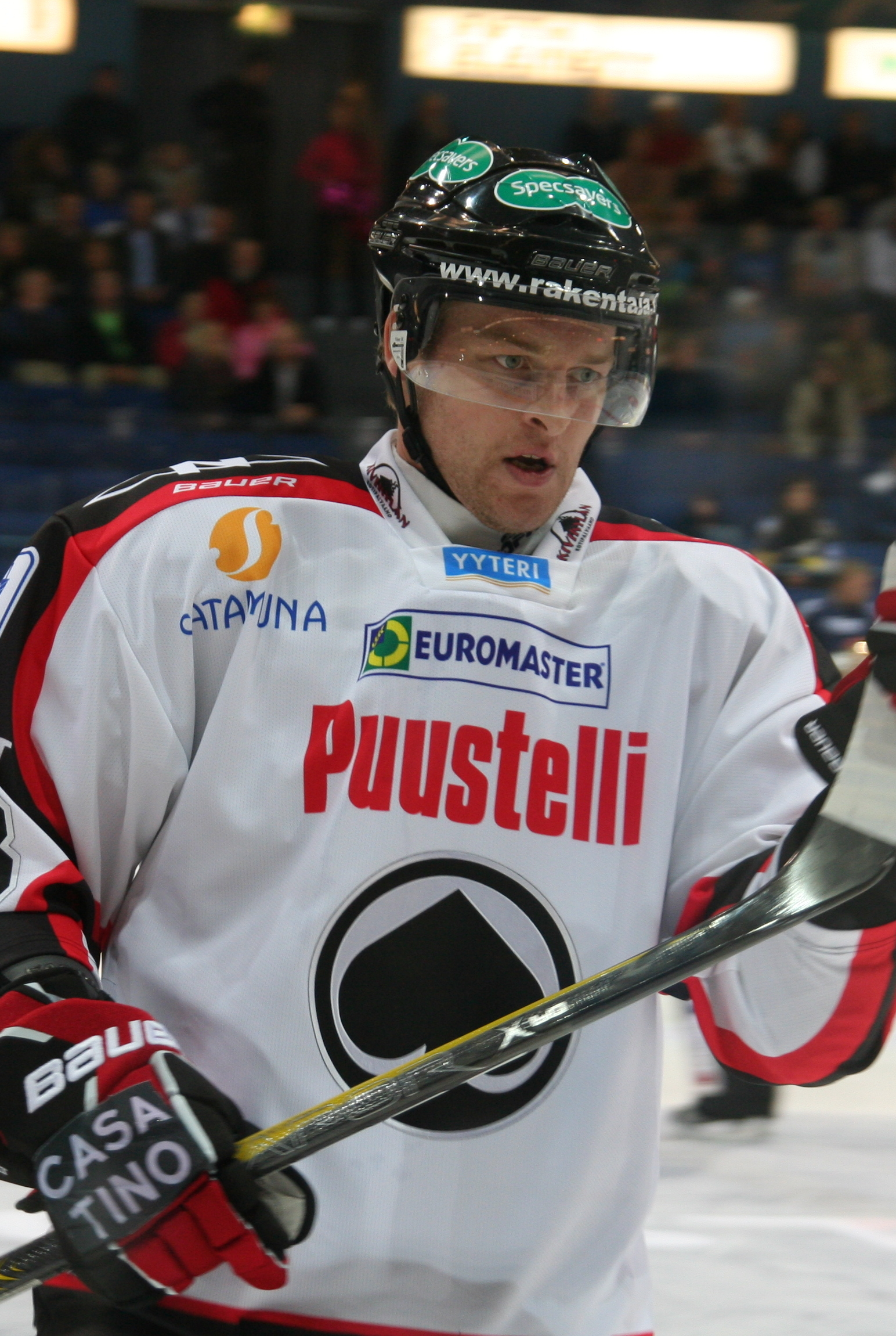
- Born: May 9, 1980 (age 45) Tampere, Finland
- Height: 6 ft 2 in (188 cm)
- Weight: 209 lb (95 kg; 14 st 13 lb)
- Position: Left wing
- Shot: Left
- Played for: Tappara; Kokkolan Hermes; Lukko; Oulun Kärpät; KalPa; Porin Ässät; Frederikshavn White Hawks; Uplakers II
- NHL draft: Undrafted
- Playing career: 1999–2016

Teemu Normio (born May 9, 1980) is a Finnish professional ice hockey player who is currently playing for Frederikshavn White Hawks in the AL-Bank Ligaen.

== Career statistics ==
| | | | Regular season | | | | | Playoffs |
| Season | Team | League | GP | G | A | Pts | PIM | GP | G | A | Pts | PIM |
|---|---|---|---|---|---|---|---|---|---|---|---|---|
| 1994–95 | Tappara U16 | U16 SM-sarja | 2 | 1 | 0 | 1 | 0 | — | — | — | — | — |
| 1995–96 | Tappara U16 | U16 SM-sarja | 32 | 12 | 14 | 26 | 24 | — | — | — | — | — |
| 1996–97 | Tappara U18 | U18 SM-sarja | 36 | 12 | 6 | 18 | 57 | — | — | — | — | — |
| 1997–98 | Tappara U18 | U18 SM-sarja | 14 | 5 | 13 | 18 | 10 | — | — | — | — | — |
| 1997–98 | Tappara U20 | U20 SM-liiga | 35 | 2 | 1 | 3 | 30 | 6 | 0 | 1 | 1 | 2 |
| 1998–99 | Tappara U20 | U20 SM-liiga | 32 | 5 | 10 | 15 | 42 | — | — | — | — | — |
| 1999–00 | Tappara U20 | U20 SM-liiga | 34 | 12 | 11 | 23 | 34 | 10 | 5 | 8 | 13 | 31 |
| 1999–00 | Tappara | SM-liiga | 11 | 0 | 0 | 0 | 0 | 2 | 0 | 0 | 0 | 0 |
| 2000–01 | Kokkolan Hermes | Mestis | 40 | 12 | 18 | 30 | 61 | 8 | 2 | 5 | 7 | 10 |
| 2001–02 | Lukko | SM-liiga | 54 | 7 | 16 | 23 | 52 | — | — | — | — | — |
| 2002–03 | Lukko | SM-liiga | 53 | 4 | 7 | 11 | 59 | — | — | — | — | — |
| 2003–04 | Lukko | SM-liiga | 53 | 1 | 5 | 6 | 60 | 4 | 0 | 1 | 1 | 4 |
| 2004–05 | Lukko | SM-liiga | 54 | 1 | 4 | 5 | 42 | 9 | 3 | 2 | 5 | 4 |
| 2005–06 | Lukko | SM-liiga | 45 | 8 | 13 | 21 | 42 | — | — | — | — | — |
| 2006–07 | Oulun Kärpät | SM-liiga | 56 | 14 | 9 | 23 | 60 | 10 | 2 | 0 | 2 | 12 |
| 2007–08 | Oulun Kärpät | SM-liiga | 39 | 6 | 5 | 11 | 46 | 15 | 3 | 5 | 8 | 16 |
| 2008–09 | Oulun Kärpät | SM-liiga | 46 | 6 | 5 | 11 | 36 | 15 | 2 | 0 | 2 | 12 |
| 2009–10 | Oulun Kärpät | SM-liiga | 41 | 2 | 4 | 6 | 61 | 10 | 0 | 0 | 0 | 4 |
| 2010–11 | KalPa | SM-liiga | 2 | 0 | 0 | 0 | 4 | — | — | — | — | — |
| 2010–11 | Porin Ässät | SM-liiga | 10 | 1 | 0 | 1 | 10 | — | — | — | — | — |
| 2010–11 | Frederikshavn White Hawks | Denmark | 13 | 5 | 4 | 9 | 20 | 7 | 0 | 0 | 0 | 29 |
| 2014–15 | Uplakers II | III-divisioona | 9 | 7 | 11 | 18 | 16 | — | — | — | — | — |
| 2015–16 | Uplakers II | III-divisioona | 2 | 3 | 2 | 5 | 0 | — | — | — | — | — |
| SM-liiga totals | | | 464 | 50 | 68 | 118 | 472 | 65 | 10 | 8 | 18 | 75 |
