= 2005–06 Slovak 1. Liga season =

Slovak ice hockey league season

The 2005–06 Slovak 1.Liga season was the 13th season of the Slovak 1. Liga, the second level of ice hockey in Slovakia. 12 teams participated in the league, and HC 05 Banska Bystrica won the championship.

== Regular season ==
	Club	GP	W	OTW	OTL	L	Goals	Pts
1.	HC 05 Banská Bystrica	44	31	3	5	5	157:73	104
2.	HC VTJ Topoľčany	44	25	4	3	12	182:143	86
3.	HK Spišská Nová Ves	44	25	2	2	15	158:122	81
4.	HKm Humenné	44	22	5	2	15	189:137	78
5.	ŠHK 37 Piešťany	44	22	2	3	17	140:113	73
6.	HK 95 Považská Bystrica	44	22	3	1	18	137:136	73
7.	MšHK Prievidza	44	21	4	1	18	138:123	72
8.	HK Lietajúce kone Prešov	44	20	2	4	18	123:121	68
9.	HC Dukla Senica	44	17	2	2	23	152:161	57
10.	HK Trnava	44	13	4	5	22	117:141	52
11.	HK VTJ Trebišov	44	6	1	4	33	85:200	24
12.	HK Levice	44	6	2	2	34	92:200	24

== Playoffs ==
=== Quarterfinals ===
- HC 05 Banská Bystrica – HK Lietajúce kone Prešov 4:1 (2:1, 5:0k, 1:2, 4:1, 2:0)
- HC VTJ Telvis Topoľčany – MšHK Prievidza 4:1 (3:0, 6:1, 3:7, 5:4sn, 3:1)
- HK Spišská Nová Ves – HK 95 Považská Bystrica 2:4 (3:2, 0:5, 2:3, 2:7, 5:3, 3:5)
- HKm Humenné – ŠHK 37 Piešťany 4:3 (11:3, 8:2, 2:5, 1:3, 3:1, 4:5sn, 5:3)

=== Semifinals ===
- HC 05 Banská Bystrica – HK 95 Považská Bystrica 4:3 (3:2, 5:3, 0:2, 2:6, 3:5, 4:2, 5:0)
- HC VTJ Telvis Topoľčany – HKm Humenné 1:4 (5:4, 1:5, 5:6sn, 2:3PP, 4:8)

=== Final ===
- HC 05 Banská Bystrica – HKm Humenné 4:0 (5:3, 5:1, 4:2, 3:2)

== Relegation ==
- HK Levice – HK Ružinov 99 Bratislava 0:2 (1:6, 4:7)
