= Angel Krstev =

Czech ice hockey player

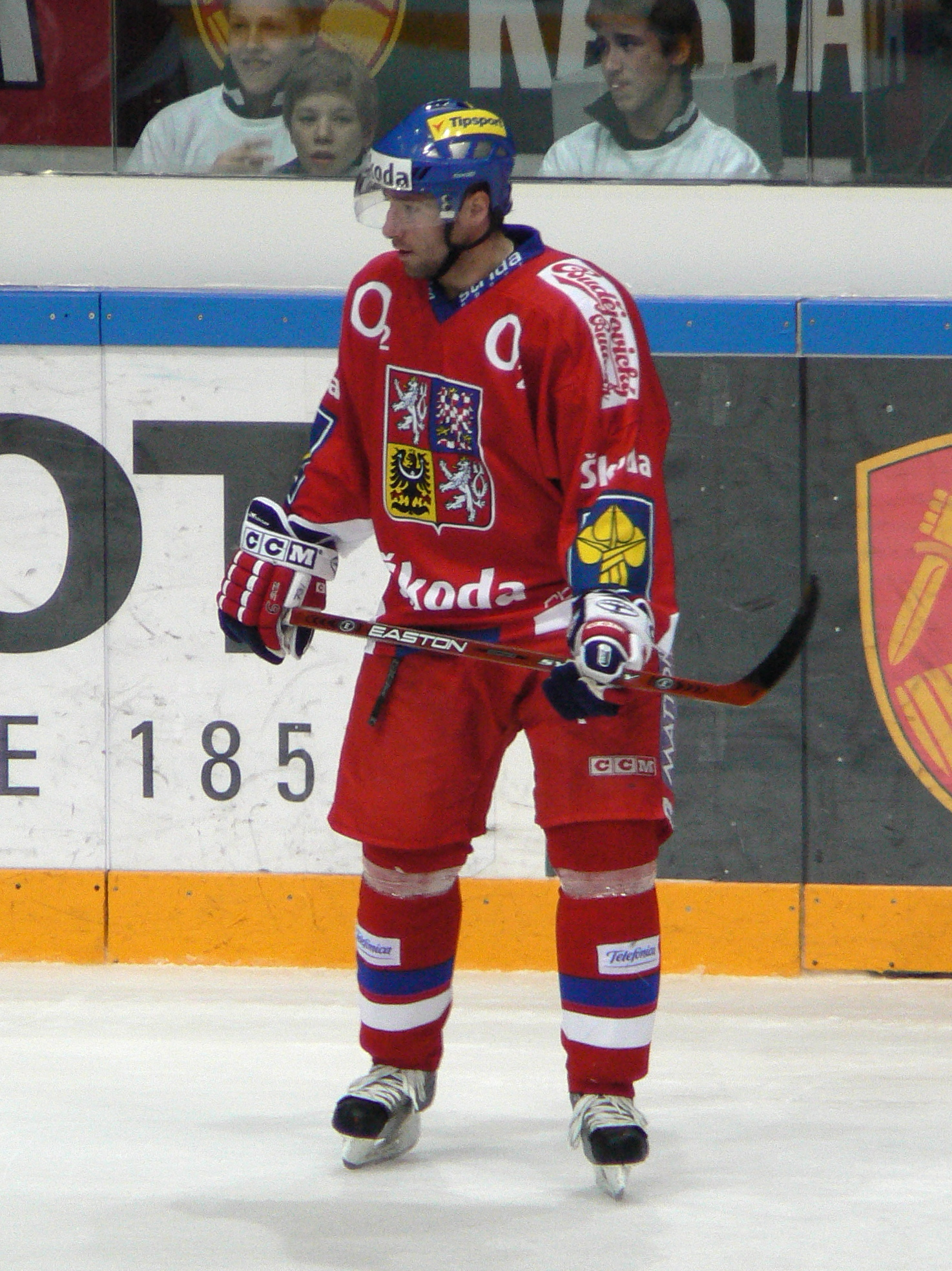
- Born: December 15, 1980 Prague, Czechoslovakia
- Height: 5 ft 11 in (180 cm)
- Weight: 225 lb (102 kg; 16 st 1 lb)
- Position: Defence
- Shot: Left
- KHL team: Avtomobilist Yekaterinburg
- National team: Czech Republic
- NHL draft: Undrafted
- Playing career: 1998–2022

Angel Krstev (born December 15, 1980) is a Czech professional ice hockey defenceman who currently plays for Lukko of the Finnish SM-liiga.

== Career statistics ==
			Regular season					Playoffs
Season	Team	League	GP	G	A	Pts	PIM	GP	G	A	Pts	PIM
1995–96	1. CLTK Praha U20	Czech U20 2	32	10	10	20	—	—	—	—	—	—
1996–97	HC Slavia Praha U18	Czech U18	40	6	15	21	—	—	—	—	—	—
1996–97	HC Slavia Praha U20	Czech U20	1	0	0	0	—	—	—	—	—	—
1997–98	HC Slavia Praha U20	Czech U20	38	4	7	11	—	7	1	2	3	—
1997–98	HC Slavia Praha	Czech	5	0	1	1	4	—	—	—	—	—
1998–99	HC Slavia Praha U20	Czech U20	46	9	15	24	—	3	0	1	1	—
1998–99	HC Slavia Praha	Czech	1	0	0	0	0	—	—	—	—	—
1999–00	Lethbridge Hurricanes	WHL	31	5	11	16	66	—	—	—	—	—
1999–00	HC Slavia Praha U20	Czech U20	20	4	6	10	64	—	—	—	—	—
1999–00	HC Slavia Praha	Czech	9	2	2	4	12	—	—	—	—	—
2000–01	HC Slavia Praha U20	Czech U20	5	1	4	5	47	—	—	—	—	—
2000–01	HC Slavia Praha	Czech	20	1	3	4	12	3	0	0	0	4
2000–01	KLH Chomutov	Czech2	19	5	8	13	88	10	1	3	4	16
2001–02	Bílí Tygři Liberec	Czech2	36	4	25	29	117	12	1	8	9	34
2002–03	Bílí Tygři Liberec	Czech	48	8	7	15	187	—	—	—	—	—
2003–04	Bílí Tygři Liberec	Czech	21	0	1	1	22	—	—	—	—	—
2003–04	HC Chemopetrol	Czech	25	2	1	3	65	—	—	—	—	—
2004–05	Bílí Tygři Liberec	Czech	18	0	1	1	26	—	—	—	—	—
2004–05	HC České Budějovice	Czech2	25	3	18	21	60	11	2	2	4	14
2005–06	Bílí Tygři Liberec	Czech	50	6	12	18	103	5	0	0	0	10
2006–07	Bílí Tygři Liberec	Czech	52	4	4	8	119	12	0	2	2	24
2007–08	Bílí Tygři Liberec	Czech	52	4	7	11	102	11	0	0	0	16
2008–09	HC Vítkovice	Czech	47	4	8	12	160	10	1	1	2	28
2009–10	Torpedo Nizhny Novgorod	KHL	21	1	6	7	22	—	—	—	—	—
2009–10	HC Kometa Brno	Czech	8	0	4	4	34	—	—	—	—	—
2009–10	Färjestad BK	Elitserien	9	0	1	1	12	7	0	0	0	25
2010–11	Avtomobilist Yekaterinburg	KHL	43	2	11	13	73	—	—	—	—	—
2011–12	HC Sparta Praha	Czech	24	0	6	6	39	5	1	3	4	8
2011–12	IHC Písek	Czech2	2	1	0	1	2	—	—	—	—	—
2012–13	HC Sparta Praha	Czech	38	1	12	13	24	3	0	1	1	4
2013–14	HC Stadion Litoměřice	Czech2	10	2	4	6	33	—	—	—	—	—
2013–14	Piráti Chomutov	Czech	39	1	4	5	50	—	—	—	—	—
2014–15	HC Stadion Litoměřice	Czech2	22	0	8	8	18	—	—	—	—	—
2014–15	HC Neumarkt-Egna	Italy	19	4	8	12	48	—	—	—	—	—
2015–16	HC Stadion Litoměřice	Czech2	28	2	13	15	72	—	—	—	—	—
2015–16	HC Sparta Praha	Czech2	22	2	11	13	28	8	0	4	4	4
2017–18	SK Kadaň B	Czech4	8	5	8	13	—	—	—	—	—	—
2018–19	SK Kadaň B	Czech4	—	—	—	—	—	—	—	—	—	—
2019–20	SK Kadaň B	Czech4	9	2	12	14	28	2	0	2	2	4
2020–21	Piráti Chomutov	Czech4	1	0	1	1	0	—	—	—	—	—
2021–22	SK Kadaň	Czech4	2	0	1	1	34	—	—	—	—	—
KHL totals			64	3	17	20	95	—	—	—	—	—
Czech totals			457	33	73	106	959	49	2	7	9	94
Czech2 totals			164	19	87	106	418	41	4	17	21	68
