= Evgeny Muratov =

Russian ice hockey player

- Born: 28 January 1981 (age 45) Nizhny Tagil, Soviet Union
- Height: 5 ft 9 in (175 cm)
- Weight: 176 lb (80 kg; 12 st 8 lb)
- Position: Forward
- Shot: Right
- KHL team Former teams: Yugra Khanty-Mansiysk; HC Sibir Novosibirsk
- NHL draft: 274th overall, 2000; Edmonton Oilers
- Playing career: 1999–2011

Evgeny Muratov (born 28 January 1981) is a Russian professional ice hockey forward who currently plays for Yugra Khanty-Mansiysk of the Kontinental Hockey League (KHL). He had previously played in the KHL with HC Sibir Novosibirsk. He was selected by the Edmonton Oilers in the 9th round (274th overall) of the 2000 NHL entry draft.

== Career statistics ==
=== Regular season and playoffs ===
			Regular season					Playoffs
Season	Team	League	GP	G	A	Pts	PIM	GP	G	A	Pts	PIM
1997–98	Neftekhimik–2 Nizhnekamsk	RUS.3	39	7	7	14	2	—	—	—	—	—
1998–99	Neftekhimik Nizhnekamsk	RSL	7	0	0	0	0	3	1	0	1	2
1998–99	Neftekhimik–2 Nizhnekamsk	RUS.3	37	26	9	35	32	—	—	—	—	—
1999–2000	Neftekhimik Nizhnekamsk	RSL	29	9	7	16	2	—	—	—	—	—
1999–2000	Ak Bars Kazan	RSL	8	2	2	4	2	9	0	0	0	0
2000–01	Neftekhimik Nizhnekamsk	RSL	42	9	8	17	14	4	0	0	0	0
2001–02	Neftekhimik Nizhnekamsk	RSL	45	5	13	18	4	—	—	—	—	—
2002–03	Neftekhimik Nizhnekamsk	RSL	51	10	11	21	41	—	—	—	—	—
2003–04	Neftekhimik Nizhnekamsk	RSL	20	1	6	7	8	—	—	—	—	—
2004–05	Metallurg Novokuznetsk	RSL	58	15	13	28	12	4	1	2	3	0
2004–05	Metallurg–2 Novokuznetsk	RUS.3	1	0	0	0	0	—	—	—	—	—
2005–06	SKA St. Petersburg	RSL	49	13	10	23	16	3	0	1	1	0
2006–07	SKA St. Petersburg	RSL	42	5	9	14	14	1	0	0	0	0
2006–07	SKA–2 St. Petersburg	RUS.3	5	5	5	10	2	—	—	—	—	—
2007–08	Neftekhimik Nizhnekamsk	RSL	22	2	5	7	8	—	—	—	—	—
2007–08	Sibir Novosibirsk	RSL	30	3	2	5	6	—	—	—	—	—
2008–09	Sibir Novosibirsk	KHL	47	10	13	23	10	—	—	—	—	—
2009–10	Sibir Novosibirsk	KHL	43	8	12	20	14	—	—	—	—	—
2010–11	HC Yugra	KHL	39	7	14	21	18	6	0	0	0	4
RSL totals			400	74	86	160	127	24	2	3	5	2
KHL totals			129	25	39	64	42	6	0	0	0	4

=== International ===
Year	Team	Event	GP	G	A	Pts	PIM
2000	Russia	WJC	7	6	2	8	4
2001	Russia	WJC	7	2	3	5	2
Junior totals			14	8	5	13	6
