= 1999–2000 Czech 1. Liga season =

The 1999–2000 Czech 1.liga season was the seventh season of the Czech 1.liga, the second level of ice hockey in the Czech Republic. 14 teams participated in the league, and HK Dukla Jihlava won the championship.

== Regular season ==
| | Club | GP | W | T | L | Goals | Pts |
|---|---|---|---|---|---|---|---|
| 1. | KLH Chomutov | 40 | 25 | 4 | 11 | 141:81 | 54 |
| 2. | SK Horácká Slavia Třebíč | 40 | 24 | 4 | 12 | 146:99 | 52 |
| 3. | HC Dukla Jihlava | 40 | 18 | 12 | 10 | 108:90 | 48 |
| 4. | IHC Písek | 40 | 18 | 10 | 12 | 127:108 | 46 |
| 5. | HC Rosice | 40 | 17 | 11 | 12 | 107:109 | 45 |
| 6. | HC Berounští Medvědi | 40 | 15 | 11 | 14 | 136:113 | 41 |
| 7. | HC Mělník | 40 | 18 | 5 | 17 | 116:120 | 41 |
| 8. | HC Slezan Opava | 40 | 15 | 10 | 15 | 106:102 | 40 |
| 9. | SK Kadaň | 40 | 17 | 6 | 17 | 113:110 | 40 |
| 10. | HC Prostějov | 40 | 14 | 9 | 17 | 125:157 | 37 |
| 11. | HC Liberec | 40 | 14 | 8 | 18 | 103:120 | 36 |
| 12. | HC Kometa Brno | 40 | 15 | 3 | 22 | 112:141 | 33 |
| 13. | TJ Slovan Jindřichův Hradec | 40 | 14 | 1 | 25 | 102:135 | 29 |
| 14. | HC Šumperk | 40 | 8 | 2 | 30 | 98:155 | 18 |

== Playoffs ==
=== Quarterfinals ===
- KLH Chomutov – HC Opava 3:1 (5:1, 5:2, 1:3, 3:1)
- SK Horácká Slavia Třebíč – HC Mělník 2:3 (3:2 P, 7:0, 4:5, 1:3, 2:4)
- HC Dukla Jihlava – HC Beroun 3:0 (4:3 SN, 1:0 P, 4:2)
- IHC Písek – HC Rosice 3:1 (5:2, 5:3, 5:6 P, 3:2)

=== Semifinals ===
- KLH Chomutov – HC Mělník 3:0 (5:3, 3:0, 2:0)
- HC Dukla Jihlava – IHC Písek 3:0 (2:1, 4:1, 3:0)

=== Finals ===
- KLH Chomutov – HC Dukla Jihlava 2:3 (5:2, 6:0, 0:2, 2:6, 2:4)

== Qualification ==
| | Club | GP | W | T | L | GF | GA | Pts |
|---|---|---|---|---|---|---|---|---|
| 1. | HC Liberec | 50 | 21 | 10 | 19 | 137 | 139 | 52 |
| 2. | SK Kadaň | 50 | 21 | 7 | 22 | 146 | 142 | 49 |
| 3. | HC Prostějov | 50 | 18 | 9 | 23 | 158 | 196 | 45 |
| 4. | HC Kometa Brno | 50 | 18 | 6 | 26 | 142 | 180 | 42 |
| 5. | TJ Slovan Jindřichův Hradec | 50 | 20 | 1 | 29 | 135 | 165 | 41 |
| 6. | HC Šumperk | 50 | 10 | 3 | 37 | 119 | 183 | 23 |

== Relegation ==
| | Club | GP | W | T | L | GF | GA | Pts |
|---|---|---|---|---|---|---|---|---|
| 1. | HC Slovan Ústí nad Labem | 6 | 5 | 0 | 1 | 28 | 12 | 10 |
| 2. | HC Šumperk | 6 | 3 | 1 | 2 | 14 | 17 | 7 |
| 3. | HC Ytong Brno | 6 | 2 | 1 | 3 | 15 | 20 | 5 |
| 4. | TJ Slovan Jindřichův Hradec | 6 | 0 | 2 | 4 | 7 | 15 | 2 |
