= Andrei Esipov =

Russian ice hockey player (born 1980)

- Born: May 9, 1980 (age 45) Moscow, Russia
- Height: 5 ft 11 in (180 cm)
- Weight: 198 lb (90 kg; 14 st 2 lb)
- Position: Defence
- Shoots: Left
- LM team Former teams: Scorpions de Mulhouse; Krylya Sovetov Moscow; Lokomotiv Yaroslavl; Torpedo Nizhny Novgorod; HC Lada Togliatti; Metallurg Novokuznetsk; Severstal Cherepovets; HC Donbass; Sokol Krasnoyarsk; Boxers de Bordeaux
- NHL draft: Undrafted
- Playing career: 1997–present

Andrei Esipov (born May 9, 1980) is a Russian professional ice hockey player who currently plays with Scorpions de Mulhouse in the Ligue Magnus. He previously played in the Russian Superleague and the Kontinental Hockey League for Krylya Sovetov Moscow, Lokomotiv Yaroslavl, Torpedo Nizhny Novgorod, HC Lada Togliatti, Metallurg Novokuznetsk and Severstal Cherepovets. He played the 2014–15 season in the FFHG Division 1 with Boxers de Bordeaux in France and won promotion to the Ligue Magnus that season.
