= Valery Khlebnikov =

Russian ice hockey player

- Born: October 13, 1981 (age 43)
- Position: Forward
- KHL team: Avtomobilist Yekaterinburg

Valery Khlebnikov (born 13 October 1981) is a former Russian professional ice hockey forward who played for Avtomobilist Yekaterinburg of the Kontinental Hockey League (KHL).
