= Alexander Riazantsev (ice hockey) =

Russian ice hockey player

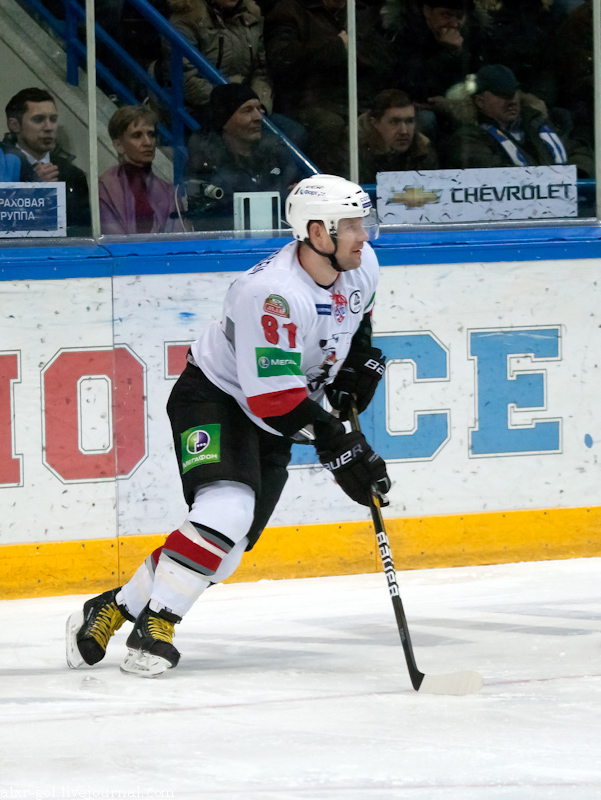
- Born: March 15, 1980 (age 46) Moscow, Russian SFSR, Soviet Union
- Height: 6 ft 0 in (183 cm)
- Weight: 209 lb (95 kg; 14 st 13 lb)
- Position: Defence
- Shot: Right
- Played for: Spartak Moscow; Hershey Bears; Milwaukee Admirals; Lokomotiv Yaroslavl; Dynamo Moscow; SKA St. Petersburg; Avangard Omsk; Vityaz Chekhov; Avtomobilist Yekaterinburg; Salavat Yulaev Ufa; Traktor Chelyabinsk; Severstal Cherepovets; Neftekhimik Nizhnekamsk; Amur Khabarovsk
- National team: Russia
- NHL draft: 167th overall, 1998; Colorado Avalanche
- Playing career: 1996–2015

Alexander Vladimirovich Riazantsev (Russian: Александр Владимирович Рязанцев) (born March 15, 1980) is a Russian former professional ice hockey defenseman. He played several seasons in the Kontinental Hockey League (KHL) before retiring in 2015. He also played several years in the American Hockey League, after being selected by the Colorado Avalanche in the 1998 NHL entry draft, though did not play in the NHL. Internationally Riazantsev played for the Russian national team at the 2005 World Championship, winning a bronze medal.

== Playing career ==
Originally drafted by the Colorado Avalanche in 1998, Riazantsev spent parts of five seasons playing for the Hershey Bears of the American Hockey League before returning to Russia in 2003, where he played until his retirement.

In January 2012, Riazantsev took a shot in a skills competition that measured a speed of 114.1 miles per hour. It is considered by KHL officials to be the hardest shot ever recorded. The National Hockey League does not recognize this feat, as the puck travels a shorter distance to the goal net in KHL competitions than in those of the NHL.

On May 5, 2012, Riazantsev joined his seventh club in just five seasons, signing a two-year contract as a free agent with the Severstal Cherepovets starting from the 2012–13 season. During the season, Riazantsev scored 9 goals from the Blueline and contributed with 20 points.

On June 11, 2013, Riazantsev was traded by Severstal to return to his original club, Spartak Moscow, in exchange for Nicholas Bushuev.

On October 4, 2014, Riazantsev continued his journeyman career when he was traded after only 8 games in the 2014–15 season with HC Neftekhimik Nizhnekamsk to Amur Khabarovsk.

== Career statistics ==
=== Regular season and playoffs ===
			Regular season					Playoffs
Season	Team	League	GP	G	A	Pts	PIM	GP	G	A	Pts	PIM
1996–97	Spartak Moscow	RSL	20	1	2	3	4	—	—	—	—	—
1996–97	SAK Moscow	RUS.3	18	0	0	0	8	—	—	—	—	—
1997–98	Spartak–2 Moscow	RUS.3	31	3	8	11	26	—	—	—	—	—
1997–98	Victoriaville Tigres	QMJHL	22	6	9	15	14	4	0	0	0	0
1998–99	Victoriaville Tigres	QMJHL	64	17	40	57	57	6	0	3	3	10
1998–99	Hershey Bears	AHL	2	0	0	0	0	—	—	—	—	—
1999–2000	Victoriaville Tigres	QMJHL	48	17	45	62	45	6	2	5	7	20
1999–2000	Hershey Bears	AHL	2	0	1	1	2	6	1	1	2	0
2000–01	Hershey Bears	AHL	66	5	18	23	26	11	0	0	0	2
2001–02	Hershey Bears	AHL	76	5	18	23	28	5	0	1	1	4
2002–03	Hershey Bears	AHL	57	5	10	15	65	—	—	—	—	—
2002–03	Milwaukee Admirals	AHL	14	3	4	7	9	5	0	4	4	2
2003–04	Lokomotiv Yaroslavl	RSL	40	3	8	11	58	—	—	—	—	—
2003–04	Lokomotiv–2 Yaroslavl	RUS.3	1	0	0	0	0	—	—	—	—	—
2004–05	Lokomotiv Yaroslavl	RSL	53	4	15	19	32	4	0	1	1	4
2005–06	Dynamo Moscow	RSL	39	3	7	10	34	4	0	1	1	29
2006–07	SKA St. Petersburg	RSL	53	6	10	16	20	3	0	0	0	0
2007–08	SKA St. Petersburg	RSL	23	0	4	4	16	9	0	2	2	2
2007–08	SKA–2 St. Petersburg	RUS.3	9	5	7	12	8	—	—	—	—	—
2008–09	SKA St. Petersburg	KHL	3	0	0	0	4	—	—	—	—	—
2008–09	Avangard Omsk	KHL	25	1	6	7	4	—	—	—	—	—
2008–09	Avangard–2 Omsk	RUS.3	1	1	1	2	0	—	—	—	—	—
2009–10	Vityaz Chekhov	KHL	43	9	12	21	20	—	—	—	—	—
2010–11	Avtomobilist Yekaterinburg	KHL	31	15	5	20	51	—	—	—	—	—
2010–11	Salavat Yulaev Ufa	KHL	3	1	0	1	2	1	0	0	0	0
2011–12	Traktor Chelyabinsk	KHL	51	18	18	36	40	16	0	4	4	16
2012–13	Severstal Cherepovets	KHL	48	9	13	22	32	9	2	0	2	20
2013–14	Spartak Moscow	KHL	2	0	1	1	2	—	—	—	—	—
2013–14	Dynamo Moscow	KHL	18	4	0	4	41	3	1	0	1	0
2013–14	Dynamo Balashikha	VHL	2	0	0	0	0	—	—	—	—	—
2014–15	Neftekhimik Nizhnekamsk	KHL	8	1	1	2	6	—	—	—	—	—
2014–15	Amur Khabarovsk	KHL	33	5	7	12	16	—	—	—	—	—
RSL totals			229	17	46	63	164	20	0	4	4	35
AHL totals			217	18	52	70	130	27	1	6	7	8
KHL totals			265	63	61	124	218	29	3	4	7	36

=== International ===
Medal record

Representing Russia

Ice hockey

World Championships
Bronze medal – third place	2005 Vienna	

World Junior Championships
Gold medal – first place	1999 Manitoba	
Silver medal – second place	2000 Skellefteå	

European Junior Championships
Bronze medal – third place	1998 Sweden	

Year	Team	Event	Result	GP	G	A	Pts	PIM
1998	Russia	EJC	3rd place, bronze medalist(s)	6	3	1	4	8
1999	Russia	WJC	1st place, gold medalist(s)	7	0	0	0	4
2000	Russia	WJC	2nd place, silver medalist(s)	7	2	6	8	2
2005	Russia	WC	3rd place, bronze medalist(s)	9	0	3	3	0
Junior totals				20	5	7	12	14
Senior totals				9	0	3	3	0
