= List of New York Rangers draft picks =

This is a complete list of ice hockey players who were drafted in the National Hockey League Entry Draft by the New York Rangers franchise. It includes every player who was drafted, regardless of whether they played for the team.

== Key ==
Played at least one game with the Rangers

General
S	Supplemental draft selection
RS	Total NHL regular season games played
PO	Total NHL post season games played

Positions
G	Goaltender	C	Center
D	Defenseman	LW	Left wing
RW	Right wing	F	Forward

Bold indicates currently active in the Rangers organization or the Rangers own their NHL rights.

== Draft picks ==
Note: Stats are updated through the 2025-26 NHL season

Draft	Round	Pick	Player	Nationality	Pos	RS	PO
1963	1	4	Al Osborne	Canada	RW		
1963	2	10	Terry Jones	Canada	C		
1963	3	15	Mike Cummins	Canada	F		
1963	4	20	Cam Allison	Canada	D		
1964	1	3	Bob Graham	Canada	D		
1964	2	9	Tim Ecclestone	Canada	RW	692	48
1964	3	15	Gordon Lowe	Canada	D		
1964	4	21	Syl Apps	Canada	C	727	23
1965	1	1	Andre Veilleux	Canada	RW		
1965	2	6	George Surmay	Canada	G		
1965	3	10	Michel Parizeau	Canada	LW	58	
1966	1	2	Brad Park	Canada	D	1113	161
1966	2	8	Joey Johnston	Canada	LW	331	
1966	3	14	Don Luce	Canada	C	894	71
1966	4	20	Jack Egers	Canada	RW	284	32
1967	1	6	Bob Dickson	Canada	LW		
1967	2	15	Brian Tosh	Canada	D		
1968	2	19	Barry Buchanan	Canada	D		
1969	1	8	Andre Dupont	Canada	D	810	140
1969	1	12	Pierre Jarry	Canada	LW	344	5
1969	2	23	Bert Wilson	Canada	LW	478	21
1969	3	35	Kevin Morrison	Canada	LW	41	
1969	4	47	Bruce Hellemond	Canada	LW		
1969	5	59	Gord Smith	Canada	D	299	
1970	1	11	Norm Gratton	Canada	RW	201	6
1970	2	25	Mike Murphy	Canada	RW	831	66
1970	3	39	Wendell Bennett	Canada	RW		
1970	4	53	Andre St. Pierre	Canada	D		
1970	5	67	Gary Coalter	Canada	RW	34	
1970	6	81	Duane Wylie	United States	C	14	
1970	7	94	Wayne Bell	Canada	G		
1970	8	106	Pierre Brind'Amour	Canada	LW		
1971	1	10	Steve Vickers	Canada	LW	698	68
1971	1	13	Steve Durbano	Canada	D	220	5
1971	2	27	Tom Williams	Canada	LW	399	29
1971	3	41	Terry West	Canada	C		
1971	4	55	Jerry Butler	Canada	RW	643	48
1971	5	69	Fraser Robertson	Canada	D		
1971	6	83	Wayne Wood	Canada	G		
1971	7	96	Doug Keeler	Canada	C		
1971	7	97	Jean-Denis Royal	Canada	D		
1971	8	109	Gene Sobchuk	Canada	LW	1	
1971	9	110	Jim Ivison	Canada	D		
1971	10	111	Andre Peloffy	France	C	9	
1971	11	112	Elston Evoy	Canada	C		
1971	12	114	Gerry Lecomte	Canada	D		
1971	13	115	Wayne Forsey	Canada	LW		
1971	14	116	Bill Forrest	Canada	D		
1972	1	10	Al Blanchard	Canada	LW		
1972	1	15	Bob MacMillan	Canada	C	753	31
1972	2	21	Larry Sacharuk	Canada	D	151	2
1972	2	31	Rene Villemure	Canada	LW		
1972	3	47	Gerry Teeple	Canada	C		
1972	4	63	Doug Horbul	Canada	LW	4	
1972	5	79	Marty Gateman	Canada	D		
1972	6	95	Ken Ireland	Canada	C		
1972	7	111	Jeff Hunt	Canada	LW		
1972	8	127	Yvon Blais	Canada	D		
1972	9	137	Pierre Archambault	Canada	D		
1973	1	14	Rick Middleton	Canada	RW	1,005	114
1973	2	30	Pat Hickey	Canada	LW	644	55
1973	3	46	John Campbell	Canada	LW		
1973	4	62	Brian Molvik	Canada	D		
1973	5	78	Pierre Laganiere	Canada	RW		
1973	6	94	Dwayne Pentland	Canada	D		
1974	1	14	Dave Maloney	Canada	D	657	49
1974	2	32	Ron Greschner	Canada	D	982	84
1974	3	50	Jerry Holland	Canada	LW	37	
1974	4	68	Boyd Anderson	Canada	LW		
1974	5	86	Dennis Olmstead	Canada	C		
1974	6	104	Eddie Johnstone	Canada	RW	426	55
1974	7	122	John Memryk	Canada	G		
1974	8	139	Greg Holst	Canada	C	11	
1974	9	156	Claude Arvisais	Canada	C		
1974	10	171	Ken Dodd	Canada	LW		
1974	11	186	Ralph Krentz	Canada	LW		
1974	12	198	Larry Jacques	Canada	RW		
1974	13	208	Tom Castle	Canada	LW		
1974	14	218	Eric Brubacher	Canada	C		
1974	15	224	Russ Hall	Canada	RW		
1974	16	227	Bill Kriski	Canada	G		
1974	17	230	Kevin Treacy	Canada	RW		
1974	18	233	Ken Gassoff	Canada	C		
1974	19	236	Cliff Bast	Canada	D		
1974	20	239	Jim Mayer	Canada	RW	4	
1974	21	241	Warren Miller	United States	RW	262	6
1974	22	243	Kevin Walker	Canada	D		
1974	23	245	Jim Warner	United States	RW	32	
1975	1	12	Wayne Dillon	Canada	C	229	3
1975	2	30	Doug Soetaert	Canada	G	284	5
1975	3	48	Greg Hickey	Canada	LW	1	
1975	4	66	Bill Cheropita	Canada	G		
1975	5	84	Larry Huras	Canada	D	2	
1975	6	102	Randy Koch	United States	LW		
1975	7	120	Claude Larose	Canada	LW	25	2
1975	8	138	Bill Hamilton	Canada	C		
1975	9	154	Bud Stefanski	Canada	C	1	
1975	10	169	Daniel Beaulieu	Canada	LW		
1975	11	184	John McMorrow	United States	C		
1975	12	195	Tom McNamara	United States	G		
1975	13	200	Steve Roberts	United States	D		
1975	13	201	Paul Dionne	Canada	D		
1975	14	205	Cecil Luckern	United States	LW		
1975	15	209	John Corriveau	United States	RW		
1975	16	212	Tom Funke	United States	LW		
1976	1	6	Don Murdoch	Canada	RW	320	24
1976	2	24	Dave Farrish	Canada	D	430	14
1976	3	42	Mike McEwen	Canada	D	716	78
1976	4	60	Calude Periard	Canada	LW		
1976	5	78	Doug Caines	Canada	C		
1976	6	96	Barry Scully	Canada	RW		
1976	7	112	Remi Levesque	Canada	C		
1977	1	8	Lucien DeBlois	Canada	RW	993	52
1977	1	13	Ron Duguay	Canada	C	860	89
1977	2	26	Mike Keating	Canada	LW	1	
1977	3	44	Steve Baker	United States	G	57	14
1977	4	62	Mario Marois	Canada	D	955	100
1977	5	80	Benoit Gosselin	Canada	LW	7	
1977	6	98	John Bethel	Canada	LW	17	
1977	7	116	Bob Sullivan	Canada	LW	62	
1977	8	131	Lance Nethery	Canada	C	41	14
1977	9	146	Alex Jeans	Canada	C		
1977	10	157	Pete Raps	Canada	LW		
1977	11	164	Mike Brown	United States	RW		
1977	12	171	Mark Miller	Canada	LW		
1978	2	26	Don Maloney	Canada	LW	765	94
1978	3	43	Ray Markham	Canada	C	14	7
1978	3	44	Dean Turner	United States	D	35	
1978	4	59	Dave Silk	United States	RW	249	13
1978	4	60	Andre Dore	Canada	D	257	23
1978	5	76	Mike McDougall	United States	RW	61	
1978	6	93	Tom Laidlaw	Canada	D	705	69
1978	7	110	Dan Clark	Canada	D	4	
1978	8	127	Greg Kostenko	Canada	D		
1978	9	144	Brian McDavid	Canada	D		
1978	10	161	Mark Rodrigues	United States	G		
1978	11	176	Steve Weeks	Canada	G	290	12
1978	12	192	Pierre Daigneault	Canada	LW		
1978	13	206	Chris McLaughlin	United States	D		
1978	14	217	Todd Johnson	United States	C		
1978	15	223	Dan McCarthy	Canada	C	5	
1979	1	13	Doug Sulliman	Canada	LW	631	16
1979	2	34	Ed Hospodar	United States	D	450	44
1979	4	76	Pat Conacher	Canada	C	521	67
1979	5	97	Dan Makuch	Canada	RW		
1979	6	118	Stan Adams	Canada	C		
1980	1	14	Jim Malone	Canada	F		
1980	2	35	Mike Allison	Canada	RW	499	82
1980	4	77	Kurt Kleinendorst	United States	C		
1980	5	98	Scot Kleinendorst	United States	D	281	26
1980	6	119	Reijo Ruotsalainen	Finland	D	446	86
1980	7	140	Bob Scurfield	Canada	C		
1980	8	161	Bart Wilson	Canada	D		
1980	9	182	Chris Wray	United States	RW		
1980	10	203	Anders Backstrom	Sweden	D		
1981	1	9	James Patrick	Canada	D	1,280	117
1981	2	30	Jan Erixon	Sweden	LW	556	58
1981	3	50	Peter Sundstrom	Sweden	LW	338	23
1981	3	51	Mark Morrison	Canada	C	10	
1981	4	72	John Vanbiesbrouck	United States	G	882	71
1981	6	114	Eric Magnuson	United States	C		
1981	7	135	Mike Guentzel	United States	D		
1981	8	156	Ari Lahteenmaki	Finland	RW		
1981	9	177	Paul Reifenberger	United States	C		
1981	10	198	Mario Proulx	Canada	G		
1982	1	15	Chris Kontos	Canada	C	230	20
1982	2	36	Tomas Sandstrom	Sweden	RW	983	139
1982	3	57	Corey Millen	United States	C	335	47
1982	4	78	Chris Jensen	Canada	RW	74	
1982	6	120	Tony Granato	United States	C	774	79
1982	7	141	Sergei Kapustin	Soviet Union	LW		
1982	8	160	Brian Glynn	United States	C		
1982	8	162	Janne Karlsson	Sweden	D		
1982	9	183	Kelly Miller	United States	LW	1,048	119
1982	10	193	Simo Saarinen	Finland	D	8	
1982	10	204	Bob Lowes	Canada	C		
1982	11	225	Andy Otto	United States	D		
1982	12	246	Dwayne Robinson	Canada	D		
1983	1	12	Dave Gagner	Canada	C	946	57
1983	2	33	Randy Heath	Canada	LW	13	
1983	3	49	Vesa Salo	Finland	D		
1983	3	53	Gordie Walker	Canada	LW	31	
1983	4	73	Peter Andersson	Sweden	D	47	
1983	5	93	Jim Andonoff	United States	RW		
1983	6	113	Bob Alexander	United States	D		
1983	7	133	Steve Orth	United States	C		
1983	8	153	Pete Marcov	Canada	LW		
1983	9	173	Paul Jerrard	Canada	RW	5	
1983	11	213	Bryan Walker	Canada	D		
1983	12	233	Ulf Nilsson	Sweden	G		
1984	1	14	Terry Carkner	Canada	D	858	54
1984	2	35	Raimo Helminen	Finland	C	117	2
1984	4	77	Paul Broten	United States	C	322	38
1984	5	98	Clark Donatelli	United States	LW	35	2
1984	6	119	Kjell Samuelsson	Sweden	D	813	123
1984	7	140	Thomas Hussey	Canada	LW		
1984	8	161	Brian Nelson	United States	C		
1984	9	182	Ville Kentala	Finland	LW		
1984	9	188	Heinz Ehlers	Denmark	C		
1984	10	202	Kevin Miller	United States	C	620	61
1984	11	223	Tom Lorentz	United States	C		
1984	12	243	Scott Brower	Canada	G		
1985	1	7	Ulf Dahlen	Sweden	RW	966	85
1985	2	28	Mike Richter	United States	G	666	76
1985	3	49	Sam Lindstahl	Sweden	G		
1985	4	70	Pat Janostin	Canada	D		
1985	5	91	Brad Stepan	Canada	LW		
1985	6	112	Brian McReynolds	Canada	C	30	
1985	7	133	Neil Pilon	Canada	D		
1985	8	154	Larry Bernard	Canada	LW		
1985	9	175	Stephane Brochu	Canada	D	1	
1985	10	196	Steve Nemeth	Canada	RW	12	
1985	11	217	Robert Burakovsky	Sweden	RW	23	
1985	12	238	Rudy Poeschek	Canada	D	364	5
1986	1	9	Brian Leetch	United States	D	1,205	95
1986	3	51	Bret Walter	Canada	C		
1986	3	53	Shaun Clouston	Canada	C		
1986	4	72	Mark Janssens	Canada	C	711	27
1986	5	93	Jeff Bloemberg	Canada	D	43	7
1986	6	114	Darren Turcotte	United States	C	635	35
1986	7	135	Rob Graham	United States	RW		
1986	8	156	Barry Chyzowski	Canada	C		
1986	9	177	Pat Scanlon	United States	LW		
1986	10	198	Joe Ranger	Canada	D		
1986	11	219	Russ Parent	Canada	D		
1986	12	240	Soren True	Denmark	LW		
1987	1	10	Jayson More	Canada	D	406	31
1987	2	31	Daniel Lacroix	Canada	LW	188	16
1987	3	46	Simon Gagne	Canada	RW		
1987	4	69	Mike Sullivan	United States	C	709	34
1987	5	94	Erik O'Borsky	United States	C		
1987	6	115	Ludek Cajka	Czechoslovakia	D		
1987	7	136	Clint Thomas	United States	D		
1987	8	157	Chuck Wiegand	United States	RW		
1987	9	178	Eric Burrill	United States	RW		
1987	10	199	Dave Porter	United States	F		
1987	10	205	Brett Barnett	Canada	LW		
1987	11	220	Lance Marciano	United States	D		
1988	2	22	Troy Mallette	Canada	LW	456	15
1988	2	26	Murray Duval	Canada	D		
1988	4	68	Tony Amonte	United States	RW	1,174	99
1988	5	99	Martin Bergeron	Canada	C		
1988	6	110	Dennis Vial	Canada	D	242	
1988	7	131	Mike Rosati	Canada	G	1	
1988	8	152	Eric Couvrette	Canada	LW		
1988	10	194	Paul Cain	Canada	C		
1988	10	202	Eric Fenton	United States	RW		
1988	11	215	Peter Fiorentino	Canada	D	1	
1988	12	236	Keith Slifstein	United States	RW		
1989	1	20	Steven Rice	Canada	RW	329	2
1989	2	40	Jason Prosofsky	Canada	RW		
1989	3	45	Rob Zamuner	Canada	LW	798	34
1989	3	49	Louie DeBrusk	Canada	LW	401	15
1989	4	67	Jim Cummins	United States	RW	511	37
1989	5	88	Aaron Miller	United States	D	677	80
1989	6	118	Joby Messier	Canada	D	25	
1989	7	139	Greg Leahy	United States	F		
1989	8	160	Greg Spenrath	Canada	D		
1989	9	181	Mark Bavis	United States	LW		
1989	10	202	Roman Oksiuta	Soviet Union	RW	153	10
1989	11	223	Steve Locke	Canada	D		
1989	12	244	Kenneth MacDermid	Canada	LW		
1990	1	13	Michael Stewart	Canada	D		
1990	2	34	Doug Weight	United States	C	1,238	97
1990	3	55	John Vary	Canada	D		
1990	4	69	Jeff Nielsen	United States	RW	252	4
1990	4	76	Rick Willis	United States	LW		
1990	5	85	Sergei Zubov	Soviet Union	D	1,068	164
1990	5	99	Lubos Rob	Czechoslovakia	C		
1990	6	118	Jason Weinrich	United States	D		
1990	7	139	Bryan Lonsinger	United States	D		
1990	8	160	Todd Hedlund	United States	RW		
1990	9	181	Andrew Silverman	United States	D		
1990	10	202	Jon Hillebrandt	United States	G		
1990	11	223	Brett Lievers	United States	C		
1990	12	244	Sergei Nemchinov	Soviet Union	C	761	105
1991	1	15	Alexei Kovalev	Soviet Union	RW	1,300	116
1991	2	37	Darcy Werenka	Canada	D		
1991	5	96	Corey Machanic	United States	D		
1991	6	125	Fredrik Jax	Sweden	RW		
1991	6	128	Barry Young	United Kingdom	D		
1991	7	147	John Rushin	United States	C		
1991	8	169	Corey Hirsch	Canada	G	108	6
1991	9	191	Vyacheslav Uvayev	Soviet Union	D		
1991	10	213	Jamie Ram	Canada	G	1	
1991	11	235	Vitali Chinakhov	Soviet Union	C		
1991	12	257	Brian Wiseman	Canada	C	3	
1992	1	24	Peter Ferraro	United States	C	92	2
1992	2	48	Mattias Norstrom	Sweden	D	903	56
1992	3	72	Eric Cairns	Canada	LW	457	16
1992	4	85	Chris Ferraro	United States	C	74	
1992	5	120	Dmitri Starostenko	Belarus	RW		
1992	6	144	David Dal Grande	Canada	D		
1992	7	168	Matt Oates	Canada	LW		
1992	8	192	Mickey Elick	Canada	D		
1992	9	216	Daniel Brierley	United States	D		
1992	10	240	Vladimir Vorobiev	Russia	RW	33	1
1993	1	8	Niklas Sundstrom	Sweden	LW	750	59
1993	2	34	Lee Sorochan	Canada	D	3	
1993	3	61	Maxim Galanov	Russia	D	122	1
1993	4	86	Sergei Olympijev	Belarus	LW		
1993	5	112	Gary Roach	Canada	D		
1993	6	138	Dave Trofimenkoff	Canada	G		
1993	7	162	Sergei Kondrashkin	Russia	LW		
1993	7	164	Todd Marchant	United States	LW	1,195	95
1993	8	190	Ed Campbell	United States	D		
1993	9	216	Ken Shepard	Canada	G		
1993	10	242	Andrei Kudinov	Russia	C		
1993	11	261	Pavel Komarov	Russia	D		
1993	11	268	Maxim Smelnitsky	Russia	LW		
1994	1	26	Dan Cloutier	Canada	G	351	8
1994	2	52	Rudolf Vercik	Slovakia	LW		
1994	3	78	Adam Smith	Canada	D		
1994	4	100	Alexander Korobolin	Russia	D		
1994	4	104	Sylvain Blouin	Canada	LW	115	
1994	5	130	Martin Ethier	Canada	D		
1994	6	135	Yuri Litvinov	Russia	C		
1994	6	156	David Brosseau	Canada	RW		
1994	7	182	Alexei Lazarenko	Ukraine	RW		
1994	8	208	Craig Anderson	United States	D		
1994	9	209	Vitali Yeremeyev	Kazakhstan	G	4	
1994	9	234	Eric Boulton	Canada	LW	547	4
1994	10	260	Radoslav Kropac	Slovakia	F		
1994	11	267	Jamie Butt	Canada	LW		
1994	11	286	Kim Johnsson	Sweden	D	739	43
1995	2	39	Christian Dube	Canada	RW	33	3
1995	3	65	Mike Martin	Canada	D		
1995	4	91	Marc Savard	Canada	C	807	25
1995	5	110	Alexei Vasiliev	Russia	D	1	
1995	5	117	Dale Purinton	United States	D	181	
1995	6	143	Peter Slamiar	Slovakia	RW		
1995	7	169	Jeff Heil	United States	G		
1995	8	195	Ilya Gorokhov	Russia	D		
1995	9	221	Bob Maudie	Canada	C		
1996	1	22	Jeff Brown	Canada	D		
1996	2	48	Daniel Goneau	Canada	LW	53	
1996	3	76	Dmitri Subbotin	Russia	LW		
1996	5	131	Colin Pepperall	Canada	LW		
1996	6	158	Ola Sandberg	Sweden	D		
1996	7	185	Jeff Dessner	United States	D		
1996	8	211	Ryan McKie	Canada	D		
1996	9	237	Ronnie Sundin	Sweden	D	1	
1997	1	19	Stefan Cherneski	Canada	RW		
1997	2	46	Wes Jarvis	Canada	D		
1997	3	73	Burke Henry	Canada	D	39	
1997	4	93	Tomi Kallarsson	Finland	D		
1997	5	126	Jason McLean	Canada	G		
1997	5	134	Johan Lindbom	Sweden	RW	38	
1997	6	136	Mike York	United States	C	579	6
1997	6	154	Shawn Degagne	Canada	G		
1997	7	175	Johan Holmqvist	Sweden	G	99	6
1997	7	182	Mike Mottau	United States	D	321	19
1997	8	210	Andrew Proskurnicki	Canada	LW		
1997	9	236	Richard Miller	United States	D		
1998	1	7	Manny Malhotra	Canada	C	991	35
1998	2	40	Randy Copley	Canada	LW		
1998	3	66	Jason LaBarbera	Canada	G	187	
1998	4	114	Boyd Kane	Canada	LW	31	
1998	5	122	Pat Leahy	United States	RW	50	
1998	5	131	Tomas Kloucek	Czech Republic	D	141	
1998	7	180	Stefan Lundqvist	Sweden	RW		
1998	8	207	Johan Witehall	Sweden	LW	54	
1998	9	235	Jan Mertzig	Sweden	D	23	
1999	1	4	Pavel Brendl	Czech Republic	RW	78	2
1999	1	9	Jamie Lundmark	Canada	C	295	6
1999	2	59	David Inman	Canada	LW		
1999	3	79	Johan Asplund	Sweden	G		
1999	3	90	Patrick Aufiero	United States	D		
1999	5	137	Garret Bembridge	Canada	RW		
1999	6	177	Jay Dardis	United States	C		
1999	7	197	Arto Laatikainen	Finland	D		
1999	8	226	Evgeny Gusakov	Russia	LW		
1999	9	251	Peter Henning	Sweden	RW		
1999	9	254	Alexei Bulatov	Russia	LW		
2000	2	64	Filip Novak	Czech Republic	D	17	
2000	3	95	Dominic Moore	Canada	C	897	101
2000	4	112	Premysl Duben	Czech Republic	D		
2000	5	140	Nathan Martz	Canada	C		
2000	5	143	Brandon Snee	United States	G		
2000	6	175	Sven Helfenstein	Czech Republic	C/RW		
2000	7	205	Henrik Lundqvist	Sweden	G	887	130
2000	8	238	Dan Eberly	United States	D		
2000	9	269	Martin Richter	Czech Republic	D		
2001	1	10	Dan Blackburn	Canada	G	63	
2001	2	40	Fedor Tyutin	Russia	D	872	32
2001	3	79	Garth Murray	Canada	C	116	6
2001	4	113	Bryce Lampman	United States	D	10	
2001	5	139	Shawn Collymore	Canada	RW		
2001	6	176	Marek Zidlicky	Czech Republic	D	836	49
2001	7	206	Petr Preucil	Czech Republic	LW		
2001	7	226	Pontus Petterstrom	Sweden	LW		
2001	8	230	Leonid Zvachkin	Russia	D		
2001	8	238	Ryan Hollweg	United States	C	228	14
2001	9	269	Juris Stals	Latvia	C		
2002	2	33	Lee Falardeau	United States	C		
2002	3	81	Marcus Jonasen	Sweden	LW		
2002	4	127	Nate Guenin	United States	D	205	7
2002	5	143	Mike Walsh	United States	LW		
2002	6	177	Jake Taylor	United States	D		
2002	6	194	Kim Hirschovits	Finland	C		
2002	7	226	Joey Crabb	United States	RW	179	
2002	8	240	Petr Prucha	Czech Republic	LW	346	24
2002	9	270	Rob Flynn	United States	RW		
2003	1	12	Hugh Jessiman	United States	RW	2	
2003	2	50	Ivan Baranka	Slovakia	D	1	
2003	3	75	Ken Roche	United States	C		
2003	4	122	Corey Potter	United States	D	130	3
2003	5	149	Nigel Dawes	Canada	LW	212	11
2003	6	176	Ivan Dornic	Slovakia	C		
2003	6	179	Philippe Furrer	Switzerland	D		
2003	6	180	Chris Holt	United States	G	2	
2003	7	209	Dylan Reese	United States	D	78	
2003	8	243	Jan Marek	Czech Republic	F		
2004	1	6	Al Montoya	United States	G	168	
2004	1	19	Lauri Korpikoski	Finland	LW	609	30
2004	2	36	Darin Olver	Canada	C		
2004	2	48	Dane Byers	Canada	LW	14	
2004	2	51	Bruce Graham	Canada	C		
2004	2	60	Brandon Dubinsky	United States	C	823	58
2004	3	73	Zdenek Bahensky	Czech Republic	RW		
2004	3	80	Billy Ryan	United States	C		
2004	4	127	Ryan Callahan	United States	RW	757	121
2004	5	135	Roman Psurny	Czech Republic	LW		
2004	6	169	Jordan Foote	Canada	LW		
2004	8	247	Jonathan Paiement	Canada	D		
2004	9	266	Jakub Petruzalek	Czech Republic	RW	2	
2005	1	12	Marc Staal	Canada	D	1136	128
2005	2	40	Michael Sauer	United States	D	98	5
2005	2	56	Marc-Andre Cliche	Canada	RW	151	7
2005	3	66	Brodie Dupont	Canada	C	1	
2005	3	77	Dalyn Flatt	Canada	D		
2005	4	107	Tom Pyatt	Canada	C	445	40
2005	5	147	Trevor Koverko	Canada	D		
2005	6	178	Greg Beller	Canada	F		
2005	7	211	Ryan Russell	Canada	C	41	
2006	1	21	Bob Sanguinetti	United States	D	45	
2006	2	54	Artem Anisimov	Russia	C	771	43
2006	3	84	Ryan Hillier	Canada	LW		
2006	4	104	David Kveton	Czech Republic	RW		
2006	5	137	Tomas Zaborsky	Slovakia	LW		
2006	6	174	Eric Hunter	Canada	C		
2006	7	204	Lukas Zeliska	Slovakia	C		
2007	1	17	Alexei Cherepanov	Russia	RW		
2007	2	48	Antoine Lafleur	Canada	G		
2007	5	138	Max Campbell	Canada	C		
2007	6	168	Carl Hagelin	Sweden	LW	713	141
2007	7	193	David Skokan	Slovakia	C		
2007	7	198	Danny Hobbs	Canada	F		
2008	1	20	Michael Del Zotto	Canada	D	736	32
2008	2	51	Derek Stepan	United States	C	890	120
2008	3	75	Evgeny Grachev	Russia	C	34	
2008	3	90	Tomas Kundratek	Czech Republic	D	30	
2008	4	111	Dale Weise	Canada	RW	513	45
2008	5	141	Chris Doyle	Canada	C		
2008	6	171	Mitch Gaulton	Canada	D		
2009	1	19	Chris Kreider	United States	LW	883	123
2009	2	47	Ethan Werek	Canada	C		
2009	3	80	Ryan Bourque	United States	C	1	
2009	5	127	Roman Horak	Czech Republic	C	84	
2009	5	140	Scott Stajcer	Canada	G		
2009	6	170	Daniel Maggio	Canada	D		
2009	7	200	Mikhail Pashnin	Russia	D		
2010	1	10	Dylan McIlrath	Canada	D	92	5
2010	2	40	Christian Thomas	Canada	RW	27	
2010	4	100	Andrew Yogan	United States	C/LW		
2010	5	130	Jason Wilson	Canada	LW		
2010	6	157	Jesper Fast	Sweden	RW	703	80
2010	7	190	Randy McNaught	Canada	F		
2011	1	15	**J. T. Miller**	United States	LW	871	91
2011	3	72	Steven Fogarty	United States	C	31	1
2011	4	106	Michael St. Croix	Canada	C		
2011	5	134	Shane McColgan	United States	RW		
2011	5	136	Samuel Noreau	Canada	D		
2011	6	172	Peter Ceresnak	Slovakia	D		
2012	1	28	Brady Skjei	United States	D	691	76
2012	2	59	Boo Nieves	United States	C	76	
2012	4	119	Calle Andersson	Sweden	D		
2012	5	142	Thomas Spelling	Denmark	RW		
2013	3	65	Adam Tambellini	Canada	C		
2013	3	75	Pavel Buchnevich	Russia	LW	593	27
2013	3	80	Anthony Duclair	Canada	LW	607	39
2013	4	110	Ryan Graves	Canada	D	433	35
2013	6	170	Mackenzie Skapski	Canada	G	2	
2014	2	59	Brandon Halverson	United States	G	2	
2014	3	85	Keegan Iverson	United States	C		
2014	4	104	Ryan Mantha	United States	D		
2014	4	118	**Igor Shesterkin**	Russia	G	274	44
2014	5	122	Richard Nejezchleb	Czech Republic	RW		
2014	5	140	Daniel Walcott	Canada	D	1	
2014	5	142	Tyler Nanne	United States	D		
2015	2	41	Ryan Gropp	Canada	LW		
2015	3	62	Robin Kovacs	Sweden	RW		
2015	3	79	Sergey Zborovskiy	Russia	D		
2015	3	89	Aleksi Saarela	Finland	C	9	2
2015	4	113	Brad Morrison	Canada	C		
2015	4	119	Daniel Bernhardt	Sweden	RW		
2015	7	184	Adam Huska	Slovakia	G	1	
2016	3	81	Sean Day	Canada	D	2	
2016	4	98	Tarmo Reunanen	Finland	D	4	
2016	5	141	Tim Gettinger	United States	LW	16	
2016	6	171	Gabriel Fontaine	Canada	C		
2016	6	174	Tyler Wall	Canada	G		
2016	7	201	Ty Ronning	Canada	RW		
2017	1	7	Lias Andersson	Sweden	C	110	
2017	1	21	Filip Chytil	Czech Republic	C	393	36
2017	4	123	Brandon Crawley	United States	D		
2017	5	145	Calle Sjalin	Sweden	D		
2017	6	157	Dominik Lakatoš	Czech Republic	C		
2017	6	174	Morgan Barron	Canada	C	256	18
2017	7	207	Patrik Virta	Finland	C		
2018	1	9	Vitali Kravtsov	Russia	RW	64	
2018	1	22	K'Andre Miller	United States	D	368	43
2018	1	28	Nils Lundkvist	Sweden	D	183	12
2018	2	39	Olof Lindbom	Sweden	G		
2018	3	70	Jacob Ragnarsson	Sweden	D		
2018	3	88	Joey Keane	United States	D	2	
2018	4	101	Nico Gross	Switzerland	D		
2018	5	132	Lauri Pajuniemi	Finland	RW		
2018	6	163	Simon Kjellberg	Sweden	D		
2018	7	216	Riley Hugh	United States	RW		
2019	1	2	Kaapo Kakko	Finland	RW	379	44
2019	2	49	**Matthew Robertson**	Canada	D	2	
2019	2	58	Karl Henriksson	Sweden	C		
2019	3	68	Zac Jones	United States	D	115	
2019	4	112	Hunter Skinner	United States	D		
2019	5	130	Leevi Aaltonen	Finland	RW		
2019	6	161	**Adam Edstrom**	Sweden	C	62	
2019	7	205	Eric Ciccolini	Canada	RW		
2020	1	1	**Alexis Lafrenière**	Canada	LW	380	43
2020	1	19	**Braden Schneider**	Canada	D	286	43
2020	2	60	**William Cuylle**	Canada	LW	167	16
2020	3	92	Oliver Tärnström	Sweden	C		
2020	4	103	**Dylan Garand**	Canada	G		
2020	5	127	Evan Vierling	Canada	C		
2020	5	134	**Brett Berard**	United States	LW	35	
2020	6	165	**Matt Rempe**	Canada	C	59	11
2020	7	197	**Hugo Ollas**	Sweden	G		
2021	1	16	Brennan Othmann	Canada	LW	25	
2021	3	65	Jayden Grubbe	Canada	C		
2021	3	75	Ryder Korczak	Canada	C		
2021	4	104	**Brody Lamb**	United States	RW		
2021	4	106	**Kalle Väisänen**	Finland	LW		
2021	4	112	**Talyn Boyko**	Canada	G		
2021	5	144	**Jaroslav Chmelař**	Czech Republic	RW		
2021	7	208	Hank Kempf	United States	D		
2022	2	63	**Adam Sykora**	Slovakia	LW		
2022	3	97	**Bryce McConnell-Barker**	Canada	LW		
2022	4	111	**Noah Laba**	United States	C		
2022	5	159	Victor Mancini	United States	D	31	
2022	5	161	Maxim Barbashev	Russia	LW		
2022	6	191	**Zakary Karpa**	United States	C		
2023	1	23	**Gabe Perreault**	United States	RW	5	
2023	3	90	**Drew Fortescue**	United States	D		
2023	5	152	**Rasmus Larsson**	Sweden	D		
2023	6	178	**Dylan Roobroeck**	Canada	C		
2023	6	183	**Ty Henricks**	United States	C		
2024	1	30	**E. J. Emery**	United States	D		
2024	4	119	**Raoul Boilard**	Canada	C		
2024	5	159	**Nathan Aspinall**	Canada	LW		
2024	6	191	**Rico Gredig**	Switzerland	LW		
2025	2	43	**Malcolm Spence**	Canada	LW		
2025	3	70	**Sean Barnhill**	United States	D		
2025	3	89	**Artyom Gonchar**	Russia	D		
2025	4	111	**Mikkel Eriksen**	Norway	C		
2025	5	139	**Zeb Lindgren**	Sweden	D		
2025	6	166	**Samuel Jung**	Czech Republic	RW		
2025	6	171	**Evan Passmore**	Canada	D		
2025	7	203	**Felix Farhammer**	Sweden	D		
2026	1	5	**Alberts Šmits**	Latvia	D		
2026	2	64	**Ben MacBeath**	Canada	D		
2026	3	67	**Danai Shaiikov**	Kazakhstan	G		
2026	3	77	**Charlie Morrison**	Canada	D		
2026	3	81	**Tomas Chrenko**	Slovakia	C		
2026	4	102	**Spencer Bowes**	Canada	LW		
2026	6	162	**Andre Mondoux**	Canada	D		
2026	6	163	**Darian Anderson**	United States	RW		
2026	7	193	**Ivan Patrikhayev**	Russia	D		

== Supplemental Draft picks ==
Draft	Player	Nationality	Pos	RS	PO
1986	Gary Emmons	Canada	C	3	
1987	Joe Lockwood	United States	RW		
1988	Mike Hurlbut	United States	D	29	
1988	Ron Lecinskas	United States	LW		
1989	Anthony Palumbo	Canada	C		
1990	Mike Gilmore	United States	G		
1991	Steven King	United States	RW	67	
1993	Wayne Strachan	Canada	RW		

== See also ==
- List of New York Rangers players
