= 1998–99 New York Rangers season =

NHL hockey team season

1998–99 New York Rangers
- Division: 4th Atlantic
- Conference: 11th Eastern
- 1998–99 record: 33–38–11
- Home record: 17–19–5
- Road record: 16–19–6
- Goals for: 217
- Goals against: 227

Team information
- General manager: Neil Smith
- Coach: John Muckler
- Captain: Brian Leetch
- Alternate captains: Adam Graves; Jeff Beukeboom
- Arena: Madison Square Garden
- Average attendance: 18,200 (100%)
- Minor league affiliates: Hartford Wolf Pack; Charlotte Checkers

Team leaders
- Goals: Adam Graves (38)
- Assists: Wayne Gretzky (53)
- Points: Wayne Gretzky (62)
- Penalty minutes: Ulf Samuelsson (93)
- Plus/minus: Ulf Samuelsson (+6)
- Wins: Mike Richter (27)
- Goals against average: Mike Richter (2.63)

The 1998–99 New York Rangers season was the franchise's 73rd season. The Rangers missed the playoffs for a second consecutive season for the first time since the 1975–76 season and the 1976–77 season in what was Wayne Gretzky's final season in the National Hockey League (NHL).

== Regular season ==
=== Final standings ===
Atlantic Division
R	CR		GP	W	L	T	GF	GA	Pts
1	1	**New Jersey Devils**	82	47	24	11	248	196	105
2	5	**Philadelphia Flyers**	82	37	26	19	231	196	93
3	8	**Pittsburgh Penguins**	82	38	30	14	242	225	90
4	10	New York Rangers	82	33	38	11	217	227	77
5	13	New York Islanders	82	24	48	10	194	244	58

Eastern Conference
R		Div	GP	W	L	T	GF	GA	Pts
**1**	**y – New Jersey Devils**	**ATL**	**82**	**47**	**24**	**11**	**248**	**196**	**105**
**2**	**y – Ottawa Senators**	**NE**	**82**	**44**	**23**	**15**	**239**	**179**	**103**
**3**	**y – Carolina Hurricanes**	**SE**	**82**	**34**	**30**	**18**	**210**	**202**	**86**
**4**	**Toronto Maple Leafs**	**NE**	**82**	**45**	**30**	**7**	**268**	**231**	**97**
**5**	**Philadelphia Flyers**	**ATL**	**82**	**37**	**26**	**19**	**231**	**196**	**93**
**6**	**Boston Bruins**	**NE**	**82**	**39**	**30**	**13**	**214**	**181**	**91**
**7**	**Buffalo Sabres**	**NE**	**82**	**37**	**28**	**17**	**207**	**175**	**91**
**8**	**Pittsburgh Penguins**	**ATL**	**82**	**38**	**30**	**14**	**242**	**225**	**90**
9	Florida Panthers	SE	82	30	34	18	210	228	78
10	New York Rangers	ATL	82	33	38	11	217	227	77
11	Montreal Canadiens	NE	82	32	39	11	184	209	75
12	Washington Capitals	SE	82	31	45	6	200	218	68
13	New York Islanders	ATL	82	24	48	10	194	244	58
14	Tampa Bay Lightning	SE	82	19	54	9	179	292	47

Divisions: ATL – Atlantic Division, NE – Northeast Division, SE – Southeast Division

bold – Qualified for playoffs; y – Won division

=== The Great One retires ===
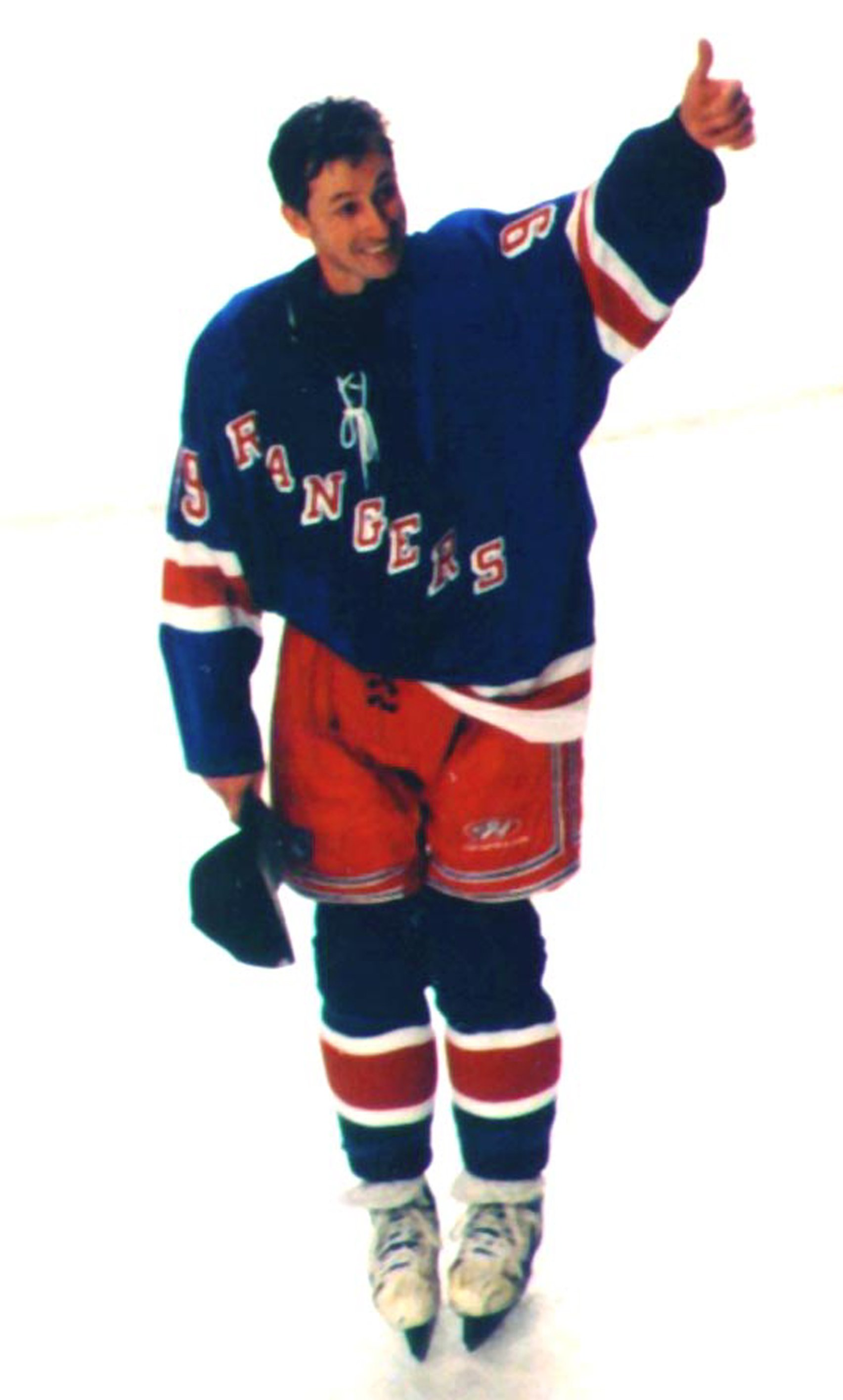
Wayne Gretzky's Farewell Game at Madison Square Garden

Wayne Gretzky's last NHL game in Canada was on April 15, 1999, in a 2–2 tie with the Ottawa Senators. His 1,487th and final game was a 2–1 overtime loss to the Pittsburgh Penguins which had Jaromir Jagr, a future Ranger captain, scoring the game-winning goal on April 18, 1999, at Madison Square Garden. The national anthems in that game were adjusted to accommodate Gretzky's departure. In place of "O Canada, we stand on guard for thee," Bryan Adams sang "We're going to miss you Wayne Gretzky." John Amirante changed lyrics in "The Star-Spangled Banner" from "the land of the free" to "the land of Wayne Gretzky." He scored his final point in this game, assisting on the lone New York goal scored by team captain Brian Leetch. Gretzky was named as the first, second and third star of both games; only Maurice Richard had such an honour previously, for his performance in a 1944 playoff game.

At the time of his retirement, Gretzky was the second-to-last former WHA player still active in professional hockey, Mark Messier being the last. Messier, himself a former Ranger who would return to spend his final four playing years there, along with other representatives of the great Edmonton Oilers dynasty of the 1980s, attended the game. Gretzky's final game was considered a "national retirement party" in Canada, and Bryan Adams' rendition of "O Canada" was like a "lullaby." As the final seconds ticked away, the crowd at Madison Square Garden gave him a standing ovation, capping off "an entirely satisfying, weekend-long going-away party" in Canada, as there would be "No Regretzkys."

Gretzky told Scott Morrison that the final game of his career was his greatest day. He recounted:

My last game in New York was my greatest day in hockey...Everything you enjoy about the sport of hockey as a kid, driving to practice with mom [Phyllis] and dad [Walter], driving to the game with mom and dad, looking in the stands and seeing your mom and dad and your friends, that all came together in that last game in New York.

== Schedule and results ==
1998–99 regular season
October: 3–4–3 (home: 3–3–1; road: 0–1–2)

Game	Date	Opponent	Score	Record	Recap
1	October 9, 1998	Philadelphia Flyers	1–0	0–1–0	L
2	October 10, 1998	@ Montreal Canadiens	7–1	0–2–0	L
3	October 12, 1998	St. Louis Blues	4–2	0–3–0	L
4	October 16, 1998	New Jersey Devils	2–1	0–4–0	L
5	October 17, 1998	@ Pittsburgh Penguins	3–3 OT	0–4–1	T
6	October 20, 1998	Edmonton Oilers	3–2	1–4–1	W
7	October 22, 1998	New York Islanders	3–2	2–4–1	W
8	October 24, 1998	@ Philadelphia Flyers	2–2 OT	2–4–2	T
9	October 27, 1998	Buffalo Sabres	0–0 OT	2–4–3	T
10	October 30, 1998	Carolina Hurricanes	1–0	3–4–3	W

November: 3–5–4 (home: 1–1–1; road: 2–4–3)

Game	Date	Opponent	Score	Record	Recap
11	November 3, 1998	@ New Jersey Devils	3–1	3–5–3	L
12	November 4, 1998	Montreal Canadiens	4–1	3–6–3	L
13	November 7, 1998	@ Toronto Maple Leafs	6–6 OT	3–6–4	T
14	November 10, 1998	@ Tampa Bay Lightning	10–2	4–6–4	W
15	November 11, 1998	@ Florida Panthers	4–1	4–7–4	L
16	November 13, 1998	Boston Bruins	3–3 OT	4–7–5	T
17	November 18, 1998	@ Mighty Ducks of Anaheim	3–1	4–8–5	L
18	November 19, 1998	@ Los Angeles Kings	5–1	5–8–5	W
19	November 21, 1998	@ San Jose Sharks	2–2 OT	5–8–6	T
20	November 25, 1998	@ Buffalo Sabres	4–2	5–9–6	L
21	November 27, 1998	@ Pittsburgh Penguins	2–2 OT	5–9–7	T
22	November 29, 1998	Nashville Predators	5–1	6–9–7	W

December: 7–6–0 (home: 3–2–0; road: 4–4–0)

Game	Date	Opponent	Score	Record	Recap
23	December 1, 1998	Florida Panthers	5–4 OT	7–9–7	W
24	December 2, 1998	@ New York Islanders	3–2	8–9–7	W
25	December 5, 1998	@ Ottawa Senators	2–1	9–9–7	W
26	December 7, 1998	Toronto Maple Leafs	6–2	10–9–7	W
27	December 9, 1998	Colorado Avalanche	2–1	10–10–7	L
28	December 11, 1998	@ Buffalo Sabres	2–0	10–11–7	L
29	December 14, 1998	Calgary Flames	5–2	11–11–7	W
30	December 16, 1998	@ New Jersey Devils	6–3	11–12–7	L
31	December 19, 1998	@ Toronto Maple Leafs	7–4	11–13–7	L
32	December 23, 1998	Carolina Hurricanes	1–0	11–14–7	L
33	December 26, 1998	@ Carolina Hurricanes	6–3	12–14–7	W
34	December 30, 1998	@ Phoenix Coyotes	3–1	12–15–7	L
35	December 31, 1998	@ Colorado Avalanche	6–3	13–15–7	W

January: 6–7–0 (home: 3–4–0; road: 3–3–0)

Game	Date	Opponent	Score	Record	Recap
36	January 2, 1999	@ St. Louis Blues	1–0	14–15–7	W
37	January 4, 1999	San Jose Sharks	4–3	15–15–7	W
38	January 6, 1999	New Jersey Devils	5–2	15–16–7	L
39	January 7, 1999	@ Washington Capitals	5–1	15–17–7	L
40	January 10, 1999	Tampa Bay Lightning	5–2	16–17–7	W
41	January 13, 1999	New York Islanders	4–3 OT	17–17–7	W
42	January 15, 1999	Chicago Blackhawks	3–1	17–18–7	L
43	January 16, 1999	@ Montreal Canadiens	3–0	17–19–7	L
44	January 19, 1999	Ottawa Senators	2–1	17–20–7	L
45	January 21, 1999	Florida Panthers	2–1	17–21–7	L
46	January 26, 1999	@ Washington Capitals	4–1	18–21–7	W
47	January 28, 1999	@ Carolina Hurricanes	3–2 OT	18–22–7	L
48	January 30, 1999	@ Detroit Red Wings	3–2	19–22–7	W

February: 6–6–0 (home: 4–4–0; road: 2–2–0)

Game	Date	Opponent	Score	Record	Recap
49	February 1, 1999	Washington Capitals	3–1	19–23–7	L
50	February 4, 1999	Vancouver Canucks	8–4	20–23–7	W
51	February 7, 1999	@ Boston Bruins	3–2	20–24–7	L
52	February 12, 1999	Carolina Hurricanes	3–1	20–25–7	L
53	February 14, 1999	Detroit Red Wings	4–2	20–26–7	L
54	February 15, 1999	@ Nashville Predators	7–4	21–26–7	W
55	February 17, 1999	Montreal Canadiens	6–3	21–27–7	L
56	February 19, 1999	Pittsburgh Penguins	6–1	22–27–7	W
57	February 21, 1999	@ Edmonton Oilers	2–1 OT	23–27–7	W
58	February 22, 1999	@ Calgary Flames	6–2	23–28–7	L
59	February 26, 1999	Phoenix Coyotes	3–0	24–28–7	W
60	February 28, 1999	Philadelphia Flyers	6–5	25–28–7	W

March: 6–5–3 (home: 2–3–3; road: 4–2–0)

Game	Date	Opponent	Score	Record	Recap
61	March 2, 1999	Dallas Stars	2–2 OT	25–28–8	T
62	March 4, 1999	@ Washington Capitals	4–2	26–28–8	W
63	March 7, 1999	@ Boston Bruins	3–1	27–28–8	W
64	March 8, 1999	Toronto Maple Leafs	3–2 OT	28–28–8	W
65	March 10, 1999	Ottawa Senators	3–0	28–29–8	L
66	March 12, 1999	Boston Bruins	5–4	28–30–8	L
67	March 14, 1999	@ New York Islanders	3–2 OT	29–30–8	W
68	March 15, 1999	Washington Capitals	1–1 OT	29–30–9	T
69	March 19, 1999	Buffalo Sabres	3–2 OT	29–31–9	L
70	March 21, 1999	Pittsburgh Penguins	2–2 OT	29–31–10	T
71	March 22, 1999	@ Tampa Bay Lightning	6–3	29–32–10	L
72	March 24, 1999	@ Florida Panthers	2–1	30–32–10	W
73	March 27, 1999	@ Philadelphia Flyers	3–1	30–33–10	L
74	March 29, 1999	New York Islanders	3–1	31–33–10	W

April: 2–5–1 (home: 1–2–0; road: 1–3–1)

Game	Date	Opponent	Score	Record	Recap
75	April 2, 1999	Mighty Ducks of Anaheim	4–1	31–34–10	L
76	April 4, 1999	@ New Jersey Devils	4–1	31–35–10	L
77	April 5, 1999	@ Philadelphia Flyers	5–1	32–35–10	W
78	April 8, 1999	@ Chicago Blackhawks	6–2	32–36–10	L
79	April 9, 1999	@ Dallas Stars	3–1	32–37–10	L
80	April 12, 1999	Tampa Bay Lightning	2–1	33–37–10	W
81	April 15, 1999	@ Ottawa Senators	2–2 OT	33–37–11	T
82	April 18, 1999	Pittsburgh Penguins	2–1 OT	33–38–11	L

Legend: W Win (2 points) L Loss (0 points) T Tie (1 point)

== Player statistics ==
=== Scoring ===
- Position abbreviations: C = Center; D = Defense; G = Goaltender; LW = Left wing; RW = Right wing
- † = Joined team via a transaction (e.g., trade, waivers, signing) during the season. Stats reflect time with the Rangers only.
- ‡ = Left team via a transaction (e.g., trade, waivers, release) during the season. Stats reflect time with the Rangers only.

No.	Player	Pos	Regular season					
No.	Player	Pos	GP	G	A	Pts	+/-	PIM
99	Wayne Gretzky	C	70	9	53	62	−23	14
15	John MacLean	RW	82	28	27	55	5	46
2	Brian Leetch	D	82	13	42	55	−7	42
9	Adam Graves	LW	82	38	15	53	−12	47
93	Petr Nedved†	C	56	20	27	47	−6	50
33	Marc Savard	C	70	9	36	45	−7	38
17	Kevin Stevens	LW	81	23	20	43	−10	64
24	Niklas Sundstrom	LW	81	13	30	43	−2	20
22	Mike Knuble	RW	82	15	20	35	−7	26
25	Mathieu Schneider†	D	75	10	24	34	−19	71
20	Todd Harvey	RW	37	11	17	28	−1	72
6	Manny Malhotra	C	73	8	8	16	−2	13
5	Ulf Samuelsson‡	D	67	4	8	12	6	93
37	Brent Fedyk	LW	67	4	6	10	−11	30
23	Jeff Beukeboom	D	45	0	9	9	−2	60
27	Alexei Kovalev‡	RW	14	3	4	7	−6	12
21	Scott Fraser	RW	28	2	4	6	−12	14
4 (Note: Tamer wore number 3 in his first three games.)	Chris Tamer†	D	52	1	5	6	−12	92
34	Peter Popovic	D	68	1	4	5	−12	40
12	Rich Brennan	D	24	1	3	4	−4	23
36	Rumun Ndur†	D	31	1	3	4	−2	46
28	Eric Lacroix†	LW	30	2	1	3	−5	4
32	Sean Pronger†‡	C	14	0	3	3	−3	4
10	Esa Tikkanen	LW	32	0	3	3	−5	38
8	Jan Mertzig	D	23	0	2	2	−5	8
25	Alexander Karpovtsev‡	D	2	1	0	1	1	0
18	Derek Armstrong	C	3	0	0	0	0	0
39	Dan Cloutier	G	22	0	0	0		2
14	Christian Dube	C	6	0	0	0	0	0
26	Jeff Finley‡	D	2	0	0	0	−1	0
19	Darren Langdon	LW	44	0	0	0	−3	80
26	Mike Maneluk†	RW	4	0	0	0	−1	4
3	Stan Neckar†‡	D	18	0	0	0	−1	8
35	Mike Richter	G	68	0	0	0		0
14	Geoff Smith‡	D	4	0	0	0	−5	2
28	P. J. Stock	LW	5	0	0	0	−1	6
14	Johan Witehall	LW	4	0	0	0	0	0
32	Harry York‡	C	5	0	0	0	−1	4

=== Goaltending ===
No.	Player	Regular season									
No.	Player	GP	W	L	T	SA	GA	GAA	SV%	SO	TOI
35	Mike Richter	68	27	30	8	1897	170	2.63	.910	4	3878
39	Dan Cloutier	22	6	8	3	570	49	2.68	.914	0	1097

== Awards and honors ==
=== Awards ===
Type	Award/honor	Recipient	Ref
League (annual)	Lady Byng Memorial Trophy	Wayne Gretzky	
League (in-season)	NHL All-Star Game selection	Wayne Gretzky (Note: Gretzky was named the All-Star Game MVP.)	
League (in-season)	NHL Player of the Week	Wayne Gretzky (April 19)	
Team	Ceil Saidel Memorial Award	Adam Graves	
Team	"Crumb Bum" Award	Rod Gilbert	
Team	Frank Boucher Trophy	Mike Richter	
Team	Good Guy Award	Kevin Stevens	
Team	Lars-Erik Sjoberg Award	Manny Malhotra	
Team	Players' Player Award	Adam Graves	
Team	Rangers MVP	Brian Leetch	
Team	Steven McDonald Extra Effort Award	Adam Graves	

=== Milestones ===
Milestone	Player	Date	Ref
First game	Jan Mertzig	October 9, 1998	
First game	Manny Malhotra	October 10, 1998	
First game	Johan Witehall	January 30, 1999	
1,000th game played	John MacLean	November 11, 1998	
1,000th game played	Ulf Samuelsson	January 13, 1999	

== Draft picks ==
New York's picks at the 1998 NHL entry draft in Buffalo, New York at the Marine Midland Arena.

Round	#	Player	Position	Nationality	College/Junior/Club team (League)
1	7	Manny Malhotra	C	Canada	Guelph Storm (OHL)
2	40	Randy Copley	LW	Canada	Cape Breton Screaming Eagles (QMJHL)
3	66	Jason LaBarbera	G	Canada	Portland Winter Hawks (WHL)
4	114	Boyd Kane	LW	Canada	Regina Pats (WHL)
5	122	Pat Leahy	RW	United States	Miami University (Ohio) (NCAA)
5	131	Tomas Kloucek	D	Czech Republic	Slavia Prague (Czech Extraliga)
7	180	Stefan Lundqvist	RW	Sweden	Brynas IF (SEL)
8	207	Johan Witehall	LW	Sweden	Leksands IF (SEL)
9	235	Jan Mertzig	D	Sweden	Lulea HF (SEL)
