= Garry Monahan =

Canadian ice hockey player (born 1946)

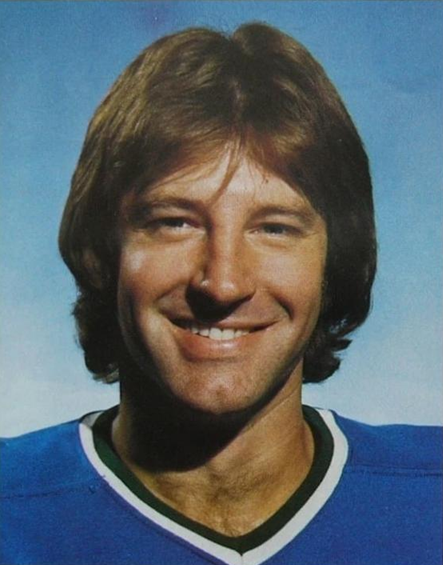
- Monahan in 1976 photo
- Born: October 20, 1946 (age 79) Barrie, Ontario, Canada
- Height: 5 ft 11 in (180 cm)
- Weight: 185 lb (84 kg; 13 st 3 lb)
- Position: Centre
- Shot: Left
- Played for: Montreal Canadiens; Detroit Red Wings; Los Angeles Kings; Toronto Maple Leafs; Vancouver Canucks
- NHL draft: 1st overall, 1963; Montreal Canadiens
- Playing career: 1967–1982

Garry Michael Monahan (born October 20, 1946) is a Canadian former professional hockey player who played 12 seasons in the National Hockey League. He was the first-ever draft pick in NHL history.

== Career ==
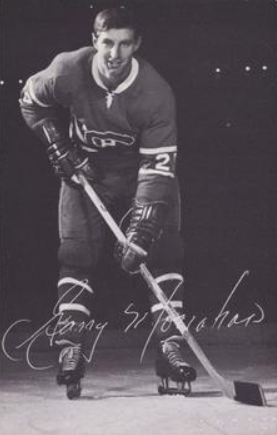
1968 photo of Monahan for the Montreal Canadiens

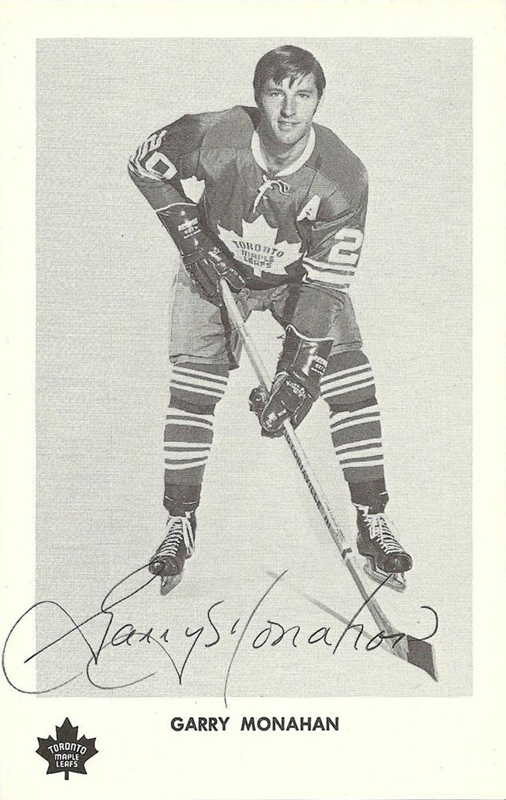
1970 card of Monahan for the Toronto Maple Leafs

Monahan was selected as the first overall pick by the Montreal Canadiens in the 1963 NHL amateur draft of 16-year-old players, becoming the inaugural pick of the NHL's first draft. Held behind closed doors and with little press coverage, the draft was obscure enough that Monahan was surprised by his selection, with his father stating aloud if they drafted Pat Monahan, Garry's older brother. Monahan was one of just five of the 21 drafted players who ended up making it to the NHL. The next season, he played junior B hockey with the St. Michael's Buzzers in Toronto before moving up to the junior A Peterborough Petes in the Ontario Hockey Association, where he played from 1964 to 1967. In his final junior year, he turned into a top scorer playing on a line with Mickey Redmond, the league's leading goal scorer. Monahan scored 30 goals and 84 points in 47 games on what was otherwise a weak Petes team.

=== Montreal Canadiens ===
He made his NHL debut with the Canadiens in the 1967–68 season but spent most of the year with Montreal's Central Hockey League affiliate, the Houston Apollos. After spending much of the entire 1968–69 season in the American Hockey League with the Cleveland Barons, Monahan was traded to the Detroit Red Wings in June 1969 in the deal where the Canadiens acquired Pete Mahovlich. Monahan saw little ice time and struggled offensively and before the end of the season was traded to the Los Angeles Kings, where the story was the same. In 72 games with the Red Wings and Kings, Monahan scored just three goals and 10 points.

=== Toronto Maple Leafs ===
Before the next season, Monahan was dealt to the Toronto Maple Leafs in the trade where the Kings acquired their future captain and coach, Bob Pulford. Monahan saw much more ice time in Toronto as a defensive forward, playing four full seasons with the Leafs. After the first game of the 1974–75 season, he was traded to the Vancouver Canucks and played there for four years, scoring his NHL career high of 18 goals and 44 points in the 1976–77 season. After his offensive numbers dropped off in his final year in Vancouver, Monahan rejoined the Leafs for the 1978–79 season, scoring just four goals in 62 games. That ended his career in the NHL, where he played 748 games over 12 seasons.

Monahan then went to Japan and played three seasons with Tokyo-based Seibu Tetsudo of the Japan Ice Hockey League, retiring after the 1981–82 season at age 35. Afterward, he spent several years working on Vancouver Canucks radio broadcasts.

== Career statistics ==
			Regular season					Playoffs
Season	Team	League	GP	G	A	Pts	PIM	GP	G	A	Pts	PIM
1964–65	Peterborough Petes	OHA-Jr.	55	12	16	28	28	12	1	2	3	11
1965–66	Peterborough Petes	OHA-Jr.	46	6	10	16	43	6	0	3	3	9
1966–67	Peterborough Petes	OHA-Jr.	47	30	54	84	79	6	2	2	4	20
1966–67	Houston Apollos	CPHL	—	—	—	—	—	3	1	0	1	0
1967–68	Montreal Canadiens	NHL	11	0	0	0	8	—	—	—	—	—
1967–68	Houston Apollos	CPHL	56	17	31	48	86	—	—	—	—	—
1968–69	Montreal Canadiens	NHL	3	0	0	0	0	—	—	—	—	—
1968–69	Cleveland Barons	AHL	70	18	26	44	81	5	2	0	2	10
1969–70	Detroit Red Wings	NHL	51	3	4	7	24	—	—	—	—	—
1969–70	Los Angeles Kings	NHL	21	0	3	3	12	—	—	—	—	—
1970–71	Toronto Maple Leafs	NHL	78	15	22	37	79	6	2	0	2	2
1971–72	Toronto Maple Leafs	NHL	78	14	17	31	47	5	0	0	0	0
1972–73	Toronto Maple Leafs	NHL	78	13	18	31	53	—	—	—	—	—
1973–74	Toronto Maple Leafs	NHL	78	9	16	25	70	4	0	1	1	7
1974–75	Toronto Maple Leafs	NHL	1	0	0	0	0	—	—	—	—	—
1974–75	Vancouver Canucks	NHL	78	14	20	34	51	5	1	0	1	2
1975–76	Vancouver Canucks	NHL	66	16	17	33	39	2	0	0	0	2
1976–77	Vancouver Canucks	NHL	76	18	26	44	48	—	—	—	—	—
1977–78	Vancouver Canucks	NHL	67	10	19	29	28	—	—	—	—	—
1977–78	Tulsa Oilers	CHL	7	3	2	5	0	—	—	—	—	—
1978–79	Toronto Maple Leafs	NHL	62	4	7	11	25	—	—	—	—	—
1979–80	Seibu Tetsudo	JIHL	20	13	17	30	—	—	—	—	—	—
1980–81	Seibu Tetsudo	JIHL	20	12	14	26	—	—	—	—	—	—
1981–82	Seibu Tetsudo	JIHL	20	17	19	36	—	—	—	—	—	—
NHL totals			748	116	169	285	484	22	3	1	4	13

Awards and achievements
Preceded by Inaugural	NHL first overall draft pick 1963	Succeeded by Claude Gauthier
Preceded by None	Montreal Canadiens first-round draft pick 1963	Succeeded by Claude Chagnon
