= Glen Shirton =

Canadian ice hockey player

- Born: July 15, 1947 (age 78) Wainfleet, Ontario, Canada
- Height: 5 ft 10 in (178 cm)
- Weight: 170 lb (77 kg; 12 st 2 lb)
- Position: Defence
- Shot: Right
- Played for: Cleveland Crusaders
- NHL draft: 18th overall, 1963; Montreal Canadiens
- Playing career: 1973–1974

Douglas Glen Shirton (born July 15, 1947) is a Canadian former professional ice hockey player who played in the World Hockey Association (WHA). Shirton played part of the 1973–74 WHA season with the Cleveland Crusaders. He was drafted in the fourth round of the 1963 NHL amateur draft by the Montreal Canadiens.

== Awards ==
- 1969–70 MCHA First All-Star Team
- 1970–71 MCHA First All-Star Team

== Career statistics ==
=== Regular season and playoffs ===
			Regular season					Playoffs
Season	Team	League	GP	G	A	Pts	PIM	GP	G	A	Pts	PIM
1963-64	Peterborough Petes	OHA	3	0	0	0	0	—	—	—	—	—
1964–65	Chatham Jr. Maroons	WOJBHL	Statistics Unavailable
1966–67	London Nationals	OHA	39	1	7	8	12	—	—	—	—	—
1967–68	London Nationals	OHA	54	3	11	14	43	—	—	—	—	—
1969–70	Bowling Green State University	MCHA	27	3	14	17	12	—	—	—	—	—
1970–71	Bowling Green State University	MCHA	28	7	14	21	18	—	—	—	—	—
1971–72	Bowling Green State University	CCHA	29	4	22	26	18	—	—	—	—	—
1973–74	Jacksonville Barons	AHL	7	1	0	1	0	—	—	—	—	—
1973–74	Cleveland Crusaders	WHA	4	0	0	0	0	—	—	—	—	—
WHA totals			4	0	0	0	0	—	—	—	—	—
