= Moe L'Abbé =

Canadian ice hockey player (1947–2024)

- Born: August 12, 1947; Montreal, Quebec, Canada
- Died: January 13, 2024 (aged 76); Frisco, Texas, U.S.
- Height: 5 ft 10 in (178 cm)
- Weight: 170 lb (77 kg; 12 st 2 lb)
- Position: Centre
- Shot: Left
- Played for: Chicago Black Hawks
- NHL draft: 22nd overall, 1964; Chicago Black Hawks
- Playing career: 1968–1976

Maurice Joseph L'Abbé (August 12, 1947 – January 13, 2024) was a Canadian ice hockey player who played five games in the National Hockey League with the Chicago Black Hawks during the 1972–73 season. The rest of his career, which lasted from 1968 to 1976, was spent in various minor leagues.

== Career ==
L'Abbé was drafted by the Chicago Black Hawks in the 1964 NHL Amateur Draft in the fourth round, 22nd overall. It was not until almost a decade later, in 1972–73 that he actually made it to the NHL level. Prior to making it to the NHL, he had played in five different minor leagues on five different teams. His big break into the NHL would not last long, though. After only five games (and one assist), he was sent back down to the minors, where he finished off his career playing for the Dallas Black Hawks of the Central Hockey League.

== Death ==
L'Abbé died in Frisco, Texas on January 13, 2024, at the age of 76.

== Career statistics ==
=== Regular season and playoffs ===
			Regular season					Playoffs
Season	Team	League	GP	G	A	Pts	PIM	GP	G	A	Pts	PIM
1964–65	St. Catharines Black Hawks	OHA	17	3	4	7	0	—	—	—	—	—
1965–66	St. Catharines Black Hawks	OHA	11	0	2	2	2	6	0	2	2	0
1966–67	St. Catharines Black Hawks	OHA	48	14	17	31	18	6	5	4	9	2
1967–68	St. Catharines Black Hawks	OHA	50	27	23	50	28	5	3	3	6	0
1968–69	Dallas Black Hawks	CHL	1	0	0	0	0	—	—	—	—	—
1968–69	Greensboro Generals	EHL	47	20	29	49	22	8	5	2	7	2
1969–70	Dallas Black Hawks	CHL	3	1	2	3	2	—	—	—	—	—
1969–70	Greensboro Generals	EHL	72	52	39	91	12	16	7	10	17	2
1970–71	Dallas Black Hawks	CHL	69	17	24	41	8	10	1	1	2	4
1971–72	Flint Generals	IHL	41	17	17	34	10	—	—	—	—	—
1971–72	Portland Buckaroos	WHL	5	0	2	2	0	—	—	—	—	—
1972–73	Chicago Black Hawks	NHL	5	0	1	1	0	—	—	—	—	—
1972–73	Dallas Black Hawks	CHL	67	28	34	62	18	7	4	6	10	0
1973–74	Dallas Black Hawks	CHL	72	24	30	54	8	10	4	7	11	0
1974–75	Dallas Black Hawks	CHL	28	9	13	22	11	—	—	—	—	—
1975–76	Dallas Black Hawks	CHL	76	38	38	76	10	10	4	3	7	2
CHL totals			316	117	141	258	57	37	13	17	30	6
NHL totals			5	0	1	1	0	—	—	—	—	—
