= Mike Pelyk =

Canadian ice hockey player (born 1947)

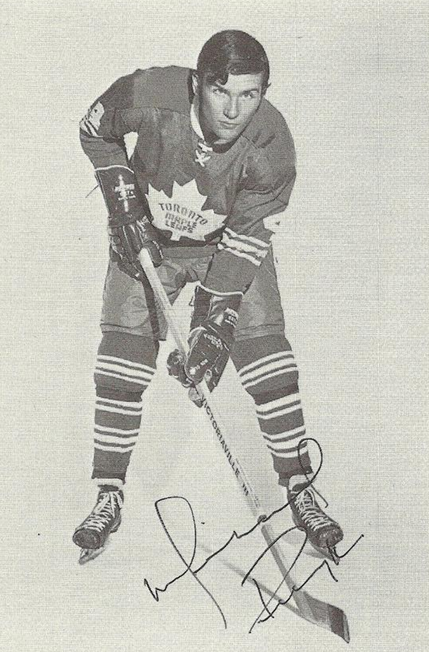
- Pelyk in 1970 photo
- Born: September 29, 1947 (age 79) Etobicoke, Ontario, Canada
- Height: 6 ft 1 in (185 cm)
- Weight: 188 lb (85 kg; 13 st 6 lb)
- Position: Defence
- Shot: Left
- Played for: Toronto Maple Leafs; Vancouver Blazers; Cincinnati Stingers
- NHL draft: 17th overall, 1964; Toronto Maple Leafs
- Playing career: 1967–1978

Michael Joseph Pelyk (born September 29, 1947) is a Canadian former professional ice hockey player who played 441 games in the National Hockey League (NHL) and 150 games in the World Hockey Association (WHA) between 1967 and 1978. He played with the Toronto Maple Leafs, Vancouver Blazers, and Cincinnati Stingers.

== Playing career ==
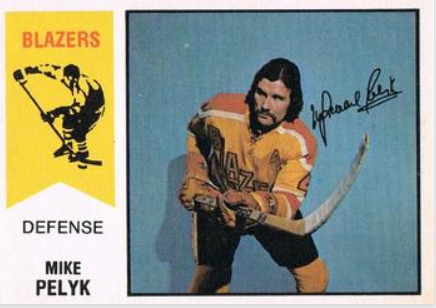
1974-75 card of Pelyk for Vancouver Blazers of the WHA

Pelyk attended Michael Power/St. Joseph High School in Etobicoke, Ontario. Although a gifted skater, Pelyk struggled with inconsistency early in his NHL career with the Toronto Maple Leafs. In the 1973–74 season he seemed to be finally reaching his potential, leading Leaf defencemen with 12 goals, when he was lured away from the Leafs with a million-dollar contact to the Vancouver Blazers of the WHA. However, he was never quite able to return to the potential shown in the 1973–74 season either in his two years in the WHA, or with his return to the NHL with the Maple Leafs in 1976. After two years alternating between the NHL and CHL, he retired in 1978.

Pelyk was captain of the WHA Cincinnati Stingers for the 1975–76 season.

== Career statistics ==
=== Regular season and playoffs ===
			Regular season					Playoffs
Season	Team	League	GP	G	A	Pts	PIM	GP	G	A	Pts	PIM
1964–65	Westclair York Steel	MetJBHL	25	2	21	23	—	—	—	—	—	—
1965–66	York Steel	MetJBHL	—	—	—	—	—	—	—	—	—	—
1965–66	Toronto Marlboros	OHA	17	0	3	3	20	—	—	—	—	—
1966–67	Toronto Marlboros	OHA	48	2	18	20	146	17	3	10	13	35
1966–67	Toronto Marlboros	M-Cup	—	—	—	—	—	9	0	4	4	37
1967–68	Toronto Maple Leafs	NHL	24	0	3	3	55	—	—	—	—	—
1967–68	Tulsa Oilers	CHL	47	0	16	16	131	—	—	—	—	—
1968–69	Toronto Maple Leafs	NHL	65	3	9	12	146	4	0	0	0	8
1969–70	Toronto Maple Leafs	NHL	36	1	3	4	37	—	—	—	—	—
1970–71	Toronto Maple Leafs	NHL	73	5	21	26	54	6	0	0	0	10
1971–72	Toronto Maple Leafs	NHL	46	1	4	5	44	5	0	0	0	8
1972–73	Toronto Maple Leafs	NHL	72	3	16	19	118	—	—	—	—	—
1973–74	Toronto Maple Leafs	NHL	71	12	19	31	94	4	0	0	0	4
1974–75	Vancouver Blazers	WHA	75	14	26	40	121	—	—	—	—	—
1975–76	Cincinnati Stingers	WHA	75	10	23	33	117	—	—	—	—	—
1976–77	Toronto Maple Leafs	NHL	13	0	2	2	4	9	0	2	2	4
1976–77	Dallas Black Hawks	CHL	62	9	26	35	73	—	—	—	—	—
1977–78	Toronto Maple Leafs	NHL	41	1	11	12	14	12	0	1	1	7
1977–78	Tulsa Oilers	CHL	32	2	12	14	35	—	—	—	—	—
WHA totals			150	24	49	73	238	—	—	—	—	—
NHL totals			441	26	88	114	566	40	0	3	3	41
