= Al Osborne =

Canadian ice hockey player (born 1947)

- Born: March 8, 1947 (age 79) Weston, Ontario
- Height: 6 ft 0 in (183 cm)
- Weight: 180 lb (82 kg; 12 st 12 lb)
- Position: Right wing
- Shot: Right
- Played for: Buffalo Bisons(AHL); Salem Rebels(EHL)
- NHL draft: 1st Round (4th overall), 1963; New York Rangers
- Playing career: 1967–1977

Al Osborne (born 8 March 1947 in Weston, Ontario) is a retired professional Canadian ice hockey player who was selected in the first round (4th overall) of the 1963 NHL amateur draft.

== Career ==
Osborne was a 16-year-old playing junior B hockey in Weston, Ontario when he was selected fourth overall by the New York Rangers in the first ever NHL amateur draft. He played three seasons (1964–67) in the Ontario Hockey Association with the Toronto Marlboros before turning professional with the Omaha Knights for the 1967-68 season in the Central Professional Hockey League. He split the following season playing in both the American Hockey League and the Eastern Hockey League where he played with the Buffalo Bisons and Salem Rebels respectively.

Osborne continued to play Senior ice hockey the next eight seasons (1969–77) in the OHA Senior A League where he suited up with the Orillia Terriers, Brantford Foresters, Cambridge Hornets, and Brantford Alexanders.

== Career statistics ==
			Regular season					Playoffs
Season	Team	League	GP	G	A	Pts	PIM	GP	G	A	Pts	PIM
1964–65	Toronto Marlboros	OHA	53	14	14	28	0
1965–66	Toronto Marlboros	OHA	34	4	14	18	59
1966–67	Toronto Marlboros	OHA	36	10	5	15	30
1967–68	Omaha Knights	CPHL	64	5	7	12	39	--	--	--	--	--
1968–69	Buffalo Bisons	AHL	3	0	0	0	0	--	--	--	--	--
1968–69	Salem Rebels	EHL	48	28	37	65	38	--	--	--	--	--
1969–70	Orillia Terriers	OHASr	N/A	24	21	45	49
1970–71	Orillia Terriers	OHASr	N/A	N/A	N/A	N/A	N/A
1971–72	Orillia Terriers	OHASr	40	20	24	44	35
1972–73	Brantford Foresters	OHASr	4	4	4	8	13
1973–74	Brantford Foresters	OHASr	24	6	6	12	16
1974–75	Brantford Foresters	OHASr	39	19	27	46	52
1975–76	Cambridge Hornets	OHASr	43	7	22	29	26
1976–77	Brantford Alexanders	OHASr	34	15	16	31	34

Preceded by None	New York Rangers first-round draft pick 1963	Succeeded by Bob Graham
