= Brian Watts (ice hockey) =

Canadian ice hockey player (born 1947)

- Born: September 10, 1947 (age 77); Hagersville, Ontario, Canada
- Height: 6 ft 0 in (183 cm)
- Weight: 185 lb (84 kg; 13 st 3 lb)
- Position: Left wing
- Shot: Left
- Played for: Detroit Red Wings; IF Björklöven
- NHL draft: 7th overall, 1964; Detroit Red Wings
- Playing career: 1970–1976

Brian Alan Watts (born September 10, 1947) is a Canadian former professional ice hockey player who played four games in the National Hockey League with the Detroit Red Wings during the 1975–76 season.

== Career statistics ==
=== Regular season and playoffs ===
| | | | Regular season | | | | | Playoffs |
| Season | Team | League | GP | G | A | Pts | PIM | GP | G | A | Pts | PIM |
|---|---|---|---|---|---|---|---|---|---|---|---|---|
| 1964–65 | Hamilton Red Wings | OHA | 49 | 5 | 8 | 13 | 0 | — | — | — | — | — |
| 1965–66 | Hamilton Red Wings | OHA | 48 | 9 | 15 | 24 | 51 | — | — | — | — | — |
| 1967–68 | Michigan Tech | WCHA | 32 | 14 | 17 | 31 | 39 | — | — | — | — | — |
| 1968–69 | Michigan Tech | WCHA | 31 | 7 | 15 | 22 | 38 | — | — | — | — | — |
| 1969–70 | Michigan Tech | WCHA | 31 | 16 | 20 | 36 | 60 | — | — | — | — | — |
| 1970–71 | Port Huron Flags | IHL | 44 | 9 | 14 | 23 | 25 | — | — | — | — | — |
| 1971–72 | Fort Worth Wings | CHL | 71 | 26 | 38 | 64 | 69 | 7 | 1 | 3 | 4 | 13 |
| 1972–73 | Virginia Wings | AHL | 72 | 20 | 25 | 45 | 43 | 13 | 4 | 4 | 8 | 16 |
| 1973–74 | London Lions | Exhib | 70 | 34 | 30 | 64 | 32 | — | — | — | — | — |
| 1974–75 | Virginia Wings | AHL | 70 | 14 | 17 | 31 | 57 | 5 | 0 | 0 | 0 | 2 |
| 1975–76 | Detroit Red Wings | NHL | 4 | 0 | 0 | 0 | 0 | — | — | — | — | — |
| 1975–76 | New Haven Nighthawks | AHL | 57 | 8 | 9 | 17 | 14 | — | — | — | — | — |
| 1976–77 | IF Björklöven | SWE | 25 | 7 | 1 | 8 | 6 | — | — | — | — | — |
| AHL totals | | | 199 | 42 | 51 | 93 | 114 | — | — | — | — | — |
| NHL totals | | | 4 | 0 | 0 | 0 | 0 | — | — | — | — | — |
