= Jim Dorey =

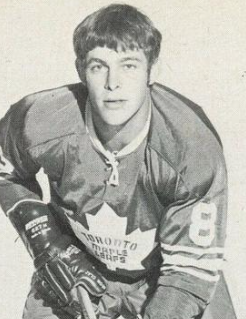
- Born: August 17, 1947 (age 78) Kingston, Ontario, Canada
- Height: 6 ft 1 in (185 cm)
- Weight: 190 lb (86 kg; 13 st 8 lb)
- Position: Defence
- Shot: Left
- Played for: Toronto Maple Leafs; New York Rangers; New England Whalers; Toronto Toros; Quebec Nordiques
- NHL draft: 23rd overall, 1964; Toronto Maple Leafs
- Playing career: 1967–1981

Robert James Dorey (born August 17, 1947) is a Canadian former professional ice hockey player who played over 650 professional games in the National Hockey League (NHL) and World Hockey Association (WHA). Dorey was a defenceman who played for the Toronto Maple Leafs and New York Rangers in the NHL. He also had a long career in the WHA playing for New England Whalers, Toronto Toros and Quebec Nordiques and played on two Avco World Trophy winning teams.

== Pro career ==
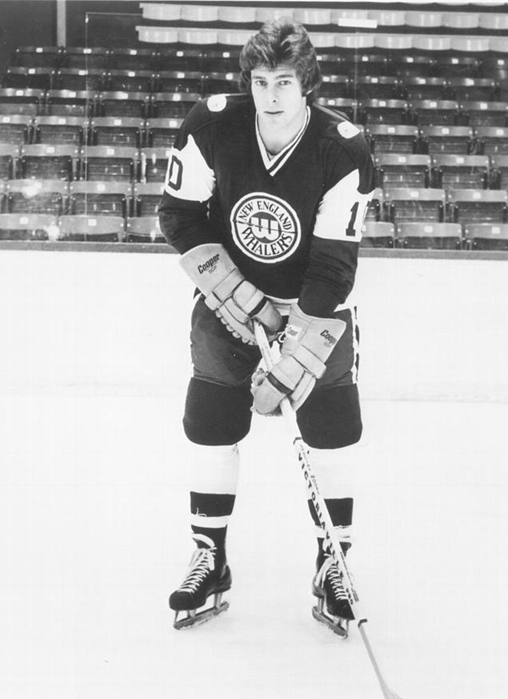
Dorey with the New England Whalers, c. 1972

Dorey made his NHL debut with the Maple Leafs on October 16, 1968 in a game against the Pittsburgh Penguins, during which he received 48 penalty minutes, an NHL single-game record at the time. His rugged, aggressive style made him as a Leaf mainstay for the next four seasons. The New York Rangers acquired him for Pierre Jarry late in the 1971–72 season, when Maple Leaf management suspected he might be about to jump to the fledgling WHA. Dorey played just one regular season game with the Rangers before suffering a separated shoulder. He returned to play in game six of the 1972 Stanley Cup Finals. That summer he signed with the WHA's New England Whalers and made the WHA All-Star Team on the Second Team. Dorey became a WHA star for the entire seven seasons of the league's existence.

After his retirement he coached the Kingston Canadians of the Ontario Hockey League. He was inducted into the Kingston and District Sports Hall of Fame.

Dorey ended his career as an Allstate Insurance agent in his hometown, and retired in March 2008. He later opened his own insurance brokerage in Kingston.

== Career statistics ==
=== Regular season and playoffs ===
			Regular season					Playoffs
Season	Team	League	GP	G	A	Pts	PIM	GP	G	A	Pts	PIM
1963–64	Niagara Falls Flyers	OHA	21	1	0	1	4	—	—	—	—	—
1965–66	London Nationals	OHA	47	5	20	25	168	—	—	—	—	—
1966–67	London Nationals	OHA	48	8	41	49	196	6	2	7	9	24
1967–68	Phoenix Roadrunners	WHL	4	0	0	0	2	—	—	—	—	—
1967–68	Tulsa Oilers	CPHL	35	4	24	28	81	11	3	5	8	15
1967–68	Rochester Americans	AHL	20	0	3	3	16	—	—	—	—	—
1968–69	Toronto Maple Leafs	NHL	61	8	22	30	200	4	0	1	1	21
1969–70	Toronto Maple Leafs	NHL	46	6	11	17	99	—	—	—	—	—
1970–71	Toronto Maple Leafs	NHL	74	7	22	29	198	6	0	1	1	19
1971–72	Toronto Maple Leafs	NHL	50	4	19	23	56	—	—	—	—	—
1971-72	New York Rangers	NHL	1	0	0	0	0	1	0	0	0	0
1972–73	New England Whalers	WHA	75	7	56	63	95	15	3	16	19	41
1973–74	New England Whalers	WHA	77	6	40	46	134	6	0	6	6	26
1974–75	New England Whalers	WHA	31	5	17	22	43	—	—	—	—	—
1974–75	Toronto Toros	WHA	43	11	23	34	69	6	2	6	8	2
1975–76	Toronto Toros	WHA	74	9	51	60	134	—	—	—	—	—
1976–77	Quebec Nordiques	WHA	73	13	34	47	102	10	0	2	2	28
1977–78	Quebec Nordiques	WHA	26	1	9	10	23	11	0	3	3	34
1977–78	Philadelphia Firebirds	AHL	5	0	1	1	6	—	—	—	—	—
1978–79	Quebec Nordiques	WHA	32	0	2	2	17	3	0	0	0	0
1980–81	New Haven Nighthawks	AHL	21	0	7	7	30	—	—	—	—	—
WHA totals			431	52	232	284	617	51	5	33	38	131
NHL totals			232	25	74	99	553	11	0	2	2	40

Preceded by Rick Cornacchia	Head coach of the Kingston Canadians; 1984–1985	Succeeded by Fred O'Donnell
Preceded by Jacques Tremblay	Head coach of the Kingston Canadians; 1987–1988	Succeeded by Larry Mavety
