= Bob Graham (ice hockey) =

Canadian ice hockey player and coach

- Born: October 7, 1947 (age 78) Montreal, Quebec, Canada
- Height: 6 ft 0 in (183 cm)
- Weight: 190 lb (86 kg; 13 st 8 lb)
- Position: Centre
- Shot: Left
- Played for: EHL; Syracuse Blazers; Charlotte Checkers
- NHL draft: 3rd overall, 1964; New York Rangers
- Playing career: 1968–1974

Robert "Bob" Graham (born October 7, 1947) is a Canadian retired professional ice hockey player and coach. He was selected by the New York Rangers in the first round (third overall) of the 1964 NHL entry draft, but never played in the National Hockey League.

== Early life ==
Graham was born in 1947 in Montreal, Quebec.

== Career ==
Graham began his professional career in 1968 with the Syracuse Blazers of the Eastern Hockey League (EHL). He played the 1968–69 season and part of the 1969–70 season in the EHL before moving on to the OHA Senior A Hockey League where he played until the 1973–74 season. He then continued his career in Europe where he both played and coached.

In the early-2000s, Graham served as an assistant coach at the University of Waterloo with the Waterloo Warriors (OUAA).

Preceded by Al Osborne	New York Rangers first-round draft pick 1964	Succeeded by Andre Veilleux
