= Tim Ecclestone =

Canadian ice hockey player (1947–2024)

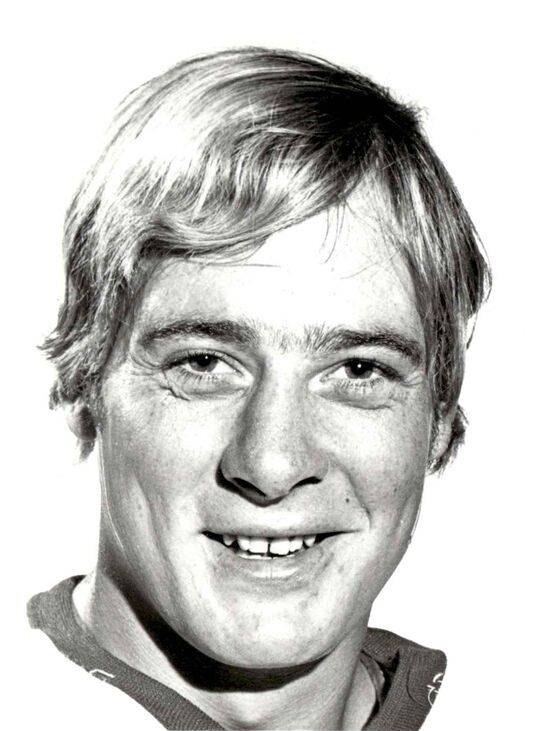
- Born: September 24, 1947 Toronto, Ontario, Canada
- Died: March 2, 2024 (aged 76) Roswell, Georgia, U.S.
- Height: 5 ft 10 in (178 cm)
- Weight: 195 lb (88 kg; 13 st 13 lb)
- Position: Left wing
- Shot: Right
- Played for: St. Louis Blues; Detroit Red Wings; Toronto Maple Leafs; Atlanta Flames
- NHL draft: 9th overall, 1964; New York Rangers
- Playing career: 1967–1978

Timothy James Ecclestone (/ˈɛkəlstoʊn/ EK-əl-stohn; September 24, 1947 – March 2, 2024) was a Canadian professional ice hockey left winger and coach who played eleven seasons in the National Hockey League (NHL). He played for the St. Louis Blues, Detroit Red Wings, Toronto Maple Leafs, and Atlanta Flames from 1967 to 1978. He played 692 career NHL games, scoring 126 goals and 233 assists for 359 points, and twice scored 50 points or more in his career. After retiring, he served as assistant coach of the Flames for three seasons.

== Early life ==
Ecclestone was born in Toronto on September 24, 1947. His father managed a dry cleaning business, while his uncle, Cam, was a celebrated softball pitcher. Ecclestone began his junior career by playing for the Etobicoke Indians of the Metro Junior B Hockey League (MJBHL) during the 1964–65 season. He was selected in the second round (ninth overall) by the New York Rangers in the 1964 NHL Amateur Draft. He was also awarded a full hockey scholarship from the University of Denver.

== Professional career ==
After opting to pursue professional hockey with the Rangers, Ecclestone played for the franchise's Kitchener Rangers affiliate in 1966–67. He was traded to the St. Louis Blues on June 6, 1967, immediately following the 1967 NHL Expansion Draft. He started the 1967–68 season playing for the Kansas City Blues of the Central Professional Hockey League, before being promoted to St. Louis. He made his National Hockey League (NHL) debut for the Blues on November 26, 1967, against the Rangers at Madison Square Garden.

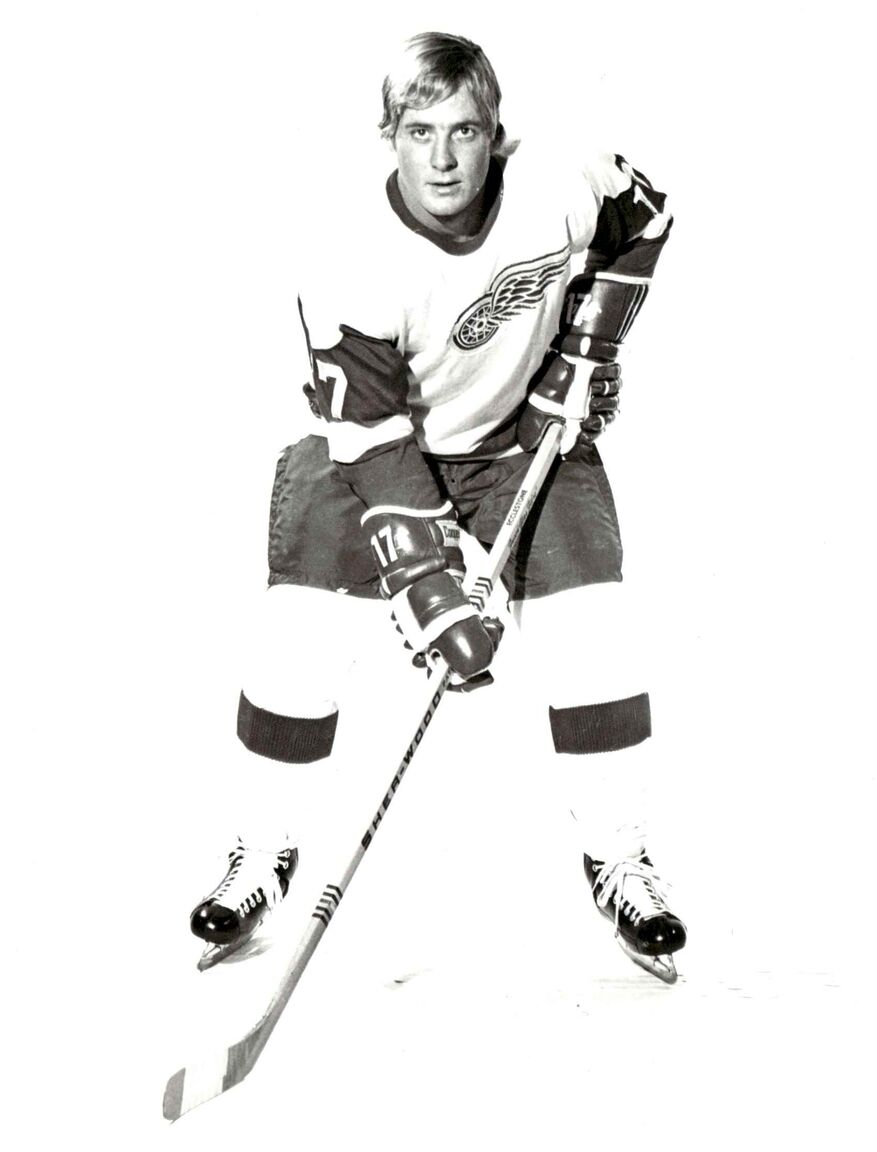
Ecclestone in uniform for the Detroit Red Wings in the 1971–72 NHL season.

Ecclestone went on to play three more seasons with the Blues and was named to the only All-Star Game of his career in 1971. That same year, he was chosen to be his team's representative to the NHL Players' Association (NHLPA). The Blues management became unhappy with his and Red Berenson's robust relationship with the union, and ultimately traded both players to the Detroit Red Wings on February 6, 1971. Although Ecclestone recorded career-highs in goals (18), assists (35), and points (53) during the 1971–72 season, the Red Wings were perennial losers at the time and he requested to be traded after four seasons. The Wings accommodated his request and he was dealt to his hometown Toronto Maple Leafs on November 29, 1973. Following a shoulder injury in his second season in Toronto, the Leafs traded Ecclestone to the Washington Capitals who in turn traded him to the Atlanta Flames, on the same day. Following a knee injury during the 1977–78 season he served as an assistant coach for the Flames. Ecclestone retired at the end of the season but remained with the Flames as an assistant coach until they relocated to Calgary in 1980.

== Later life ==
Ecclestone remained in the Atlanta area following the departure of the Flames organization, as part owner of sports bar named Timothy-John's Restaurant and Lounge in Sandy Springs, Georgia, a restaurant he helped open during his years as a Flames assistant coach. In 1990, he opened his own sports bar, called T.J.'s Sports Bar and Grill, in Alpharetta, Georgia.

== Personal life ==
Ecclestone was married to Susan (Sue) Gail Dayus until her death from ovarian cancer in July 2012. They met in high school and had two children together: Sandi and Mark. He resided in Roswell, Georgia, during his later years.

Ecclestone died on March 2, 2024. He was 76, and suffered from lung complications due to rib and clavicle fractures sustained in a fall prior to his death.

== Career statistics ==
=== Regular season and playoffs ===
			Regular season					Playoffs
Season	Team	League	GP	G	A	Pts	PIM	GP	G	A	Pts	PIM
1965–66	Etobicoke Indians	MetJHL	—	—	—	—	—	—	—	—	—	—
1966–67	Kitchener Rangers	OHA	48	27	37	64	35	13	3	12	15	14
1967–68	St. Louis Blues	NHL	50	6	8	14	16	12	1	2	3	2
1967–68	Kansas City Blues	CHL	13	4	4	8	9	—	—	—	—	—
1968–69	St. Louis Blues	NHL	68	11	23	34	31	12	2	2	4	20
1969–70	St. Louis Blues	NHL	65	16	21	37	59	16	3	4	7	48
1970–71	St. Louis Blues	NHL	47	15	24	39	34	—	—	—	—	—
1970–71	Detroit Red Wings	NHL	27	4	10	14	13	—	—	—	—	—
1971–72	Detroit Red Wings	NHL	72	18	35	53	33	—	—	—	—	—
1972–73	Detroit Red Wings	NHL	78	18	30	48	28	—	—	—	—	—
1973–74	Detroit Red Wings	NHL	14	0	5	5	6	—	—	—	—	—
1973–74	Toronto Maple Leafs	NHL	46	9	14	23	32	4	0	1	1	0
1974–75	Toronto Maple Leafs	NHL	5	1	1	2	0	—	—	—	—	—
1974–75	Atlanta Flames	NHL	62	13	21	34	34	—	—	—	—	—
1975–76	Atlanta Flames	NHL	69	6	21	27	30	—	—	—	—	—
1976–77	Atlanta Flames	NHL	78	9	18	27	26	3	0	2	2	6
1977–78	Atlanta Flames	NHL	11	0	2	2	2	1	0	0	0	0
1977–78	Tulsa Oilers	CHL	6	1	3	4	0	—	—	—	—	—
NHL totals			692	126	233	359	344	48	6	11	17	76
