= Pete Mahovlich =

Canadian ice hockey player (born 1946)

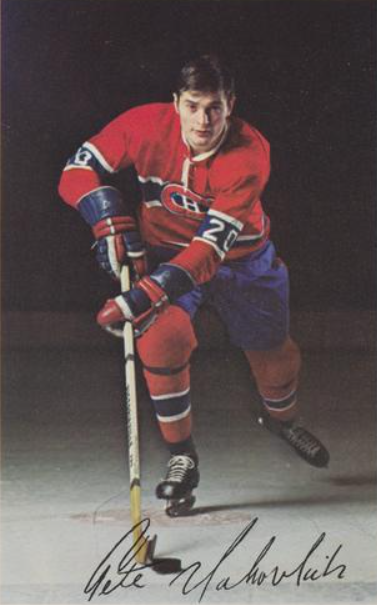
- Mahovlich in 1971 card
- Born: October 10, 1946 (age 79) Timmins, Ontario, Canada
- Height: 6 ft 5 in (196 cm)
- Weight: 210 lb (95 kg; 15 st 0 lb)
- Position: Centre
- Shot: Left
- Played for: Detroit Red Wings; Montreal Canadiens; Pittsburgh Penguins
- National team: Canada
- NHL draft: 2nd overall, 1963; Detroit Red Wings
- Playing career: 1965–1986

Peter Joseph Mahovlich (born October 10, 1946) is a Canadian former professional ice hockey player, coach and executive. Known in his playing years as "Little M", as his older brother Frank was the "Big M", Mahovlich played in the National Hockey League (NHL) with several clubs, including the Montreal Canadiens, where he played with his brother and was a member of four Stanley Cup championship teams.

== Early life ==
Mahovlich played as a first baseman on his high school baseball team, beating out Gord Kirke for the position. Like his brother Frank, Peter attended St. Michael's College School in Toronto (1961–63) where he played on their Junior B Hockey team.

== Playing career ==
Mahovlich was drafted second overall by the Detroit Red Wings in the 1963 NHL amateur draft. He played for the National Hockey League's Detroit Red Wings twice, Montreal Canadiens, Pittsburgh Penguins, the Ontario Hockey Association's Hamilton Red Wings, the AHL's Pittsburgh Hornets, Montreal Voyageurs, Adirondack Red Wings, the Central Hockey League's Fort Worth Wings and the IHL's Toledo Goaldiggers.

Mahovlich was an important contributor to the Canadiens' cup-winning teams of 1971, 1973, 1976, and 1977, before eventually being traded to the Pittsburgh Penguins. He enjoyed a breakout season in 1970–71, scoring 35 goals in the regular season and another 10 in the playoffs as the Canadiens won the championship. His best year came in 1974–75 when he racked up 117 points as part of a deep forward corps that included the likes of Guy Lafleur, Jacques Lemaire, Yvan Cournoyer, Steve Shutt and Bob Gainey. He hit the 100-point mark again the following year, finishing with 105.

During his time with the Pittsburgh Penguins, the cheer of "Pete, Pete" became common when Mahovlich made one of his end-to-end dashes up ice. He was characterized as easy-going, joyful, and a party-goer in Ken Dryden's book The Game.

In his 16-year NHL career, Mahovlich totalled 288 goals and 485 assists for 773 points in 884 games. Internationally, he was a member of the 1972 Summit Series, in which he scored a memorable shorthanded goal in game two of the series. He also played on the 1976 Canada Cup team.

== Post-playing career ==
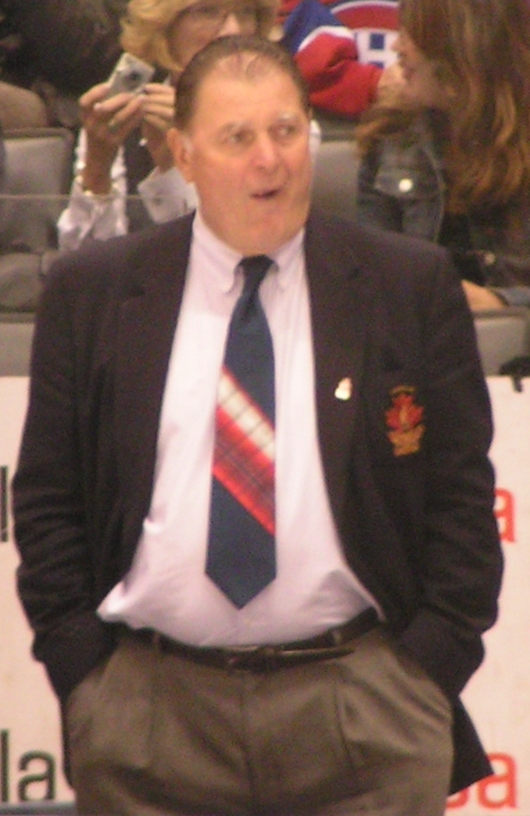
Mahovlich in 2008

After his retirement, Mahovlich was head coach of the Toledo Goaldiggers, IHL Colorado Rangers (co-coach), Denver Rangers, CHL Fort Worth Fire, and the AHL Cape Breton Oilers. He is also the brother of former Canadian Senator and former hockey star Frank Mahovlich. The two were teammates on the Red Wings from 1967 to 1969 and on the Canadiens from 1971 to 1974.

Mahovlich was a scout for the Edmonton Oilers from 1995 to 1997 before joining the Tampa Bay Lightning and then the Atlanta Thrashers. He is currently a pro scout for the Florida Panthers.

== Career statistics ==
=== Regular season and playoffs ===
			Regular season					Playoffs
Season	Team	League	GP	G	A	Pts	PIM	GP	G	A	Pts	PIM
1963–64	Hamilton Red Wings	OHA	54	20	27	47	67	—	—	—	—	—
1964–65	Hamilton Red Wings	OHA	55	20	35	55	88	—	—	—	—	—
1965–66	Hamilton Red Wings	OHA	46	14	22	36	121	4	0	0	0	2
1965–66	Detroit Red Wings	NHL	3	0	1	1	0	—	—	—	—	—
1966–67	Detroit Red Wings	NHL	34	1	3	4	16	—	—	—	—	—
1966–67	Pittsburgh Hornets	AHL	18	4	7	11	37	9	0	0	0	2
1967–68	Detroit Red Wings	NHL	15	6	4	10	13	—	—	—	—	—
1967–68	Fort Worth Wings	CPHL	42	20	14	34	103	—	—	—	—	—
1968–69	Detroit Red Wings	NHL	30	2	2	4	21	—	—	—	—	—
1968–69	Fort Worth Wings	CHL	34	19	17	36	54	—	—	—	—	—
1969–70	Montreal Canadiens	NHL	36	9	8	17	51	—	—	—	—	—
1969–70	Montreal Voyageurs	AHL	31	21	19	40	77	—	—	—	—	—
1970–71	Montreal Canadiens	NHL	78	35	26	61	181	20	10	6	16	43
1971–72	Montreal Canadiens	NHL	75	35	32	67	103	6	0	2	2	12
1972–73	Montreal Canadiens	NHL	61	21	38	59	49	17	4	9	13	22
1973–74	Montreal Canadiens	NHL	78	36	37	73	122	6	2	1	3	4
1974–75	Montreal Canadiens	NHL	80	35	82	117	64	11	6	10	16	10
1975–76	Montreal Canadiens	NHL	80	34	71	105	76	13	4	8	12	24
1976–77	Montreal Canadiens	NHL	76	15	47	62	45	13	4	5	9	19
1977–78	Montreal Canadiens	NHL	17	3	5	8	6	—	—	—	—	—
1977–78	Pittsburgh Penguins	NHL	57	25	36	61	37	—	—	—	—	—
1978–79	Pittsburgh Penguins	NHL	60	14	39	53	39	2	0	1	1	0
1979–80	Detroit Red Wings	NHL	80	16	50	66	69	—	—	—	—	—
1980–81	Detroit Red Wings	NHL	24	1	4	5	26	—	—	—	—	—
1980–81	Adirondack Red Wings	AHL	37	18	18	36	49	18	1	18	19	23
1981–82	Adirondack Red Wings	AHL	80	22	45	67	71	4	2	1	3	2
1985–86	Toledo Goaldiggers	IHL	23	4	10	14	50	—	—	—	—	—
NHL totals			884	288	485	773	916	88	30	42	72	134

=== International ===
Year	Team	Event	GP	G	A	Pts	PIM
1972	Canada	SS	7	1	1	2	4
1976	Canada	CC	7	1	4	5	5
Senior totals			14	2	5	7	9

== See also ==
- List of family relations in the NHL

Preceded by None	Detroit Red Wings first-round draft pick 1963	Succeeded by Claude Gauthier
