= Johan Witehall =

Swedish ice hockey player

- Born: January 7, 1972 (age 53); Gothenburg, Sweden
- Height: 6 ft 0 in (183 cm)
- Weight: 196 lb (89 kg; 14 st 0 lb)
- Position: Right Wing
- Shot: Left
- Played for: Frölunda HC; Leksands IF; Hamburg Freezers; EHC Chur; Montreal Canadiens; New York Rangers
- NHL draft: 207th overall, 1998; New York Rangers
- Playing career: 1990–2010

Johan Nils Erik Witehall (born January 7, 1972) is a Swedish retired professional ice hockey player who played 54 games in the National Hockey League with the New York Rangers and Montreal Canadiens between 1999 and 2001. The rest of his career, which lasted from 1990 to 2010, was mainly spent in Sweden.

== Career statistics ==
=== Regular season and playoffs ===
			Regular season					Playoffs
Season	Team	League	GP	G	A	Pts	PIM	GP	G	A	Pts	PIM
1987–88	Västra Frölunda HC U16	SWE U16	—	—	—	—	—	—	—	—	—	—
1988–89	Västra Frölunda HC U18	SWE U18	—	—	—	—	—	—	—	—	—	—
1989–90	Västra Frölunda HC U20	SWE U20	—	—	—	—	—	—	—	—	—	—
1989–90	Västra Frölunda HC	SWE	1	0	0	0	0	—	—	—	—	—
1990–91	Västra Frölunda HC U20	SWE U20	—	—	—	—	—	—	—	—	—	—
1990–91	Västra Frölunda HC	SWE	5	0	0	0	0	—	—	—	—	—
1991–92	Hanhals HF	SWE-2	32	23	14	37	52	—	—	—	—	—
1992–93	Hanhals HF	SWE-2	29	12	7	19	44	—	—	—	—	—
1993–94	Hanhals HF	SWE-2	30	13	12	25	66	—	—	—	—	—
1994–95	Hanhals HF	SWE-3	32	38	13	51	44	—	—	—	—	—
1995–96	Hanhals HF	SWE-3	36	43	17	60	48	—	—	—	—	—
1996–97	IK Oskarshamn	SWE-2	32	19	16	35	38	—	—	—	—	—
1997–98	Leksands IF	SWE	42	12	4	16	34	2	0	0	0	2
1998–99	New York Rangers	NHL	4	0	0	0	0	—	—	—	—	—
1998–99	Hartford Wolf Pack	AHL	62	14	15	29	56	7	1	2	3	6
1999–00	New York Rangers	NHL	9	1	1	2	2	—	—	—	—	—
1999–00	Hartford Wolf Pack	AHL	73	17	24	41	65	17	6	7	13	10
2000–01	New York Rangers	NHL	15	0	3	3	8	—	—	—	—	—
2000–01	Hartford Wolf Pack	AHL	19	10	8	18	19	—	—	—	—	—
2000–01	Montreal Canadiens	NHL	26	1	1	2	6	—	—	—	—	—
2000–01	Quebec Citadelles	AHL	1	0	0	0	2	9	3	5	8	6
2001–02	EHC Chur	NLA	43	22	16	38	36	—	—	—	—	—
2002–03	Hamburg Freezers	DEL	48	4	12	16	32	5	0	0	0	2
2003–04	Leksands IF	SWE	49	11	8	19	61	—	—	—	—	—
2004–05	Leksands IF	SWE-2	46	15	16	31	42	—	—	—	—	—
2005–06	Frölunda HC	SWE	48	5	11	16	43	17	2	0	2	8
2006–07	Lerums BK	SWE-4	—	—	—	—	—	—	—	—	—	—
2008–09	Lerums BK	SWE-3	7	9	4	13	6	—	—	—	—	—
2009–10	Lerums BK	SWE-4	5	4	6	10	2	—	—	—	—	—
SWE totals			145	28	23	51	138	29	4	6	10	28
NHL totals			54	2	5	7	16	—	—	—	—	—
