= 1963 NHL amateur draft =

1963 North American ice hockey draft

General information
- Date: June 5, 1963
- Location: Queen Elizabeth Hotel; Montreal, Quebec, Canada

Overview
- 21 total selections in 4 rounds
- First selection: (Canada) Garry Monahan (Montreal Canadiens)

The 1963 NHL amateur draft was the first draft for the National Hockey League. It was a draft to assign unaffiliated amateur junior-age players to NHL teams. It was held on June 5 at the Queen Elizabeth Hotel in Montreal. It was the first amateur draft, which consisted of 16-year-old players.

The amateur draft was instituted by NHL president Clarence Campbell as a means of phasing out the sponsorship of amateur teams by the league's member clubs. The NHL wanted to create what Campbell called "a uniform opportunity for each team to acquire a star player". Prior to the creation of the draft NHL teams would sponsor amateur teams and players, pre-empting other NHL clubs from acquiring new, young talent, and limiting amateur players' prospects in the NHL to the team which sponsored them.

Eligibility in this draft was limited to all amateur players who would reach 17 years of age between August 1, 1963, and July 31, 1964. Under the league rules, teams were not allowed to talk to the drafted players about turning professional until they turned 18. At that point, the teams had 72 hours to get the players signed or placed on their negotiation list. Players already on sponsorship lists were ineligible.

The draft order was determined by giving the teams choice of their place in the six-team order based on a reverse order of the standings, for example, as the Boston Bruins finished last in the 1962–63 season they were given first choice of pick in the order. The final draft order was chosen to be Montreal Canadiens, Detroit Red Wings, Boston Bruins, New York Rangers, Chicago Black Hawks and Toronto Maple Leafs. The order would rotate in the next draft such that each team moved up one spot in the order, and the first pick Canadiens would move to sixth.

This first draft consisted of four rounds, however few top prospects were available to the draft in the early years as most of hockey's top junior players had already been assigned to NHL clubs through sponsored junior teams. In the 1963 draft only 21 players, out of a possible 24 picks, were chosen. This is because teams were allowed to defer their pick to the next team in the draft order. The Red Wings chose not to exercise their third and fourth round picks, and the Black Hawks elected not to exercise their fourth round pick.

Of the players selected five eventually played in the NHL, and only one won the Stanley Cup (Peter Mahovlich). Walt McKechnie had the longest career of any of the drafted players, playing 965 NHL games, the last of them being in the 1982-1983 NHL season. None of the players selected have been inducted into the Hockey Hall of Fame.

== Selections by round ==
Below are listed the selections in the 1963 NHL amateur draft.

= NHL All-Star team ·	= NHL All-Star (Note: Players are identified as an All-Star if they were selected for the All-Star game at any time in their career.) ·

=== Round one ===
#	Player	Nationality	NHL team	College/junior/club team
1	Garry Monahan (C)	Canada	Montreal Canadiens	St. Michael's Buzzers (MetJHL)
2	Peter Mahovlich (RW)	Canada	Detroit Red Wings	St. Michael's Buzzers (MetJHL)
3	Orest Romashyna (LW)	Canada	Boston Bruins	New Hamburg Firebirds (CJCHL)
4	Al Osborne (RW)	Canada	New York Rangers	Weston Dodgers (MetJHL)
5	Art Hampson (D)	Canada	Chicago Black Hawks	Trenton Midgets (OAAAMHL)
6	Walt McKechnie (C)	Canada	Toronto Maple Leafs	London Nationals (WJBHL)

=== Round two ===
#	Player	Nationality	NHL team	College/junior/club team
7	Rodney Presswood (D)	Canada	Montreal Canadiens	Georgetown Midgets (OAAAMHL)
8	Bill Cosburn (C)	Canada	Detroit Red Wings	Bick's Pickles Midgets (OAAAMHL)
9	Terrance Lane (C)	Canada	Boston Bruins	Georgetown Midgets (OAAAMHL)
10	Terry Jones (C)	Canada	New York Rangers	Weston Midgets (OAAAMHL)
11	Wayne Davison (D)	Canada	Chicago Black Hawks	Georgetown Midgets (OAAAMHL)
12	Neil Clairmont (LW)	Canada	Toronto Maple Leafs	Parry Sound Midgets (OAAAMHL)

=== Round three ===
#	Player	Nationality	NHL team	College/junior/club team
13	Roy Pugh (C)	Canada	Montreal Canadiens	Aurora Bears (SOJCHL)
14	Roger Bamburak (RW)	Canada	Boston Bruins	Isaac Brock Secondary School (HS-Manitoba)
15	Mike Cummings (F)	Canada	New York Rangers	Georgetown Midgets (OAAAMHL)
16	Bill Carson (D)	Canada	Chicago Black Hawks	Brampton Midgets (OAAAMHL)
17	Jim McKenny (D)	Canada	Toronto Maple Leafs	Toronto Neil McNeil Maroons (MetJHL)

=== Round four ===
#	Player	Nationality	NHL team	College/junior/club team
18	Glen Shirton (D)	Canada	Montreal Canadiens	Port Colborne Midgets (OAAAMHL)
19	Jim Blair (F)	Canada	Boston Bruins	Georgetown Midgets (OAAAMHL)
20	Cam Allison (D)	Canada	New York Rangers	Portage la Prairie Terriers (CMJHL)
21	Gerry Meehan (C)	Canada	Toronto Maple Leafs	Toronto Neil McNeil Maroons (MetJHL)

= NHL All-Star team ·	= NHL All-Star ·

== See also ==
- 1963–64 NHL season
- List of NHL players
