= 1964 NHL amateur draft =

1964 North American ice hockey draft

General information
- Date: June 11, 1964
- Location: Queen Elizabeth Hotel; Montreal, Quebec, Canada

Overview
- 24 total selections in 4 rounds
- First selection: (Canada) Claude Gauthier (Detroit Red Wings)
- Hall of Famers: 1: G Ken Dryden

The 1964 NHL amateur draft was the second draft for the National Hockey League. It was a draft to assign unaffiliated amateur junior-age players to NHL teams. It was held at the Queen Elizabeth Hotel in Montreal.

As was the case in the 1963 draft, amateur players turning 17 years of age between August 1, 1964, and July 31, 1965, were eligible, if they were not already sponsored by an NHL club.

The order of the draft followed the agreement reached in 1963, where the order was fixed as Red Wings, Bruins, Rangers, Black Hawks, Maple Leafs and Canadiens. Once again each team received four picks, each team having the right to forfeit their selection and pass it to the next team in the order. All picks were exercised this year.

Of the 24 players selected only nine played in the NHL. Syl Apps Jr., Jim Dorey, Tim Ecclestone and Mike Pelyk went on to have fruitful NHL careers, each playing well over 200 games a piece. Syl Apps Jr. played his last NHL game in the 1979-1980 NHL season, making him the last active player from this draft in the NHL Ken Dryden, selected with the Bruins' third pick, 14th overall, went on to a Hall of Fame career with the Canadiens.

== Selections by round ==
Below are listed the selections in the 1964 NHL amateur draft.

= NHL All-Star team ·	= NHL All-Star (Note: Players are identified as an All-Star if they were selected for the All-Star game at any time in their career.) ·	= Hall of Famers

=== Round one ===
#	Player	Nationality	NHL team	College/junior/club team
1	Claude Gauthier (RW)	Canada	Detroit Red Wings	Rosemount Midgets (SAAAMHL)
2	Alex Campbell (RW)	Canada	Boston Bruins	Strathroy Midgets (OAAAMHL)
3	Bob Graham (D)	Canada	New York Rangers	Toronto Marlboro Midgets (OAAAMHL)
4	Richie Bayes (C)	Canada	Chicago Black Hawks	Dixie Midgets (OAAAMHL)
5	Tom Martin (RW)	Canada	Toronto Maple Leafs	Toronto Marlboro Midgets (OAAAMHL)
6	Claude Chagnon (C)	Canada	Montreal Canadiens	Rosemount Midgets (SAAAMHL)

=== Round two ===
#	Player	Nationality	NHL team	College/junior/club team
7	Brian Watts (LW)	Canada	Detroit Red Wings	Toronto Marlboro Midgets (OAAAMHL)
8	Jim Booth (LW)	Canada	Boston Bruins	Sault Ste. Marie Midgets (OAAAMHL)
9	Tim Ecclestone (RW)	Canada	New York Rangers	Etobicoke Capitols (MetJHL)
10	Jan Popiel (LW)	Canada	Chicago Black Hawks	Georgetown Midgets (OAAAMHL)
11	David Cotey (F)	Canada	Toronto Maple Leafs	Aurora Bears (SOJCHL)
12	Guy Allen (D)	Canada	Montreal Canadiens	Stamford Bruins (NDJBHL)

=== Round three ===
#	Player	Nationality	NHL team	College/junior/club team
13	Ralph Buchanan (LW)	Canada	Detroit Red Wings	Montreal East Midgets (QAAAMHL)
14	Ken Dryden (G)	Canada	Boston Bruins	Etobicoke Capitols (MetJHL)
15	Gordon Lowe (D)	Canada	New York Rangers	Toronto Marlboro Midgets (OAAAMHL)
16	Carl Hadfield (RW)	Canada	Chicago Black Hawks	Dixie Beehives (MetJHL)
17	Mike Pelyk (D)	Canada	Toronto Maple Leafs	Toronto Marlboro Midgets (OAAAMHL)
18	Paul Reid (F)	Canada	Montreal Canadiens	Kingston Midgets (OAAAMHL)

=== Round four ===
#	Player	Nationality	NHL team	College/junior/club team
19	Rene LeClerc (RW)	Canada	Detroit Red Wings	Hamilton Mountain Bees (NDJBHL)
20	Allister Blair (C)	Canada	Boston Bruins	Ingersoll Marlands (WBJHL)
21	Syl Apps Jr. (C)	Canada	New York Rangers	Kingston Midgets (OAAAMHL)
22	Moe L'Abbe (RW)	Canada	Chicago Black Hawks	Rosemount Midgets (SAAAMHL)
23	Jim Dorey (D)	Canada	Toronto Maple Leafs	Stamford Bruins (NDJBHL)
24	Michel Jacques (LW)	Canada	Montreal Canadiens	Lac Megantic Royal(LHJAA)

= NHL All-Star team ·	= NHL All-Star ·	= Hall of Famers

== See also ==
- 1964–65 NHL season
- List of NHL players
