= Jan Mertzig =

Swedish ice hockey player

- Born: July 18, 1970 (age 56) Huddinge, SWE
- Height: 6 ft 4 in (193 cm)
- Weight: 215 lb (98 kg; 15 st 5 lb)
- Position: Defence
- Shot: Left
- Played for: Luleå HF; New York Rangers; Klagenfurt AC; Linköpings HC
- NHL draft: 235th overall, 1998; New York Rangers
- Playing career: 1995–2003

Jan Mertzig (born July 18, 1970) is a Swedish former professional ice hockey player who played 23 games in the National Hockey League. He played for the New York Rangers. He was awarded Swedish Elite League Rookie of the Year Award for his achievements during the 1995–1996 season.

== Career statistics ==
=== Regular season and playoffs ===
			Regular season					Playoffs
Season	Team	League	GP	G	A	Pts	PIM	GP	G	A	Pts	PIM
1989–90	Huddinge IK	Swe-2	11	0	1	1	6	2	0	0	0	0
1990–91	Huddinge IK	Swe-2	16	5	4	9	6	—	—	—	—	—
1991–92	Huddinge IK	Swe-2	28	1	6	7	10	4	2	0	2	4
1992–93	Huddinge IK	Swe-2	35	3	7	10	18	9	1	0	1	10
1993–94	Huddinge IK	Swe-2	35	5	7	12	26	2	1	0	1	4
1994–95	Huddinge IK	Swe-2	34	10	8	18	16	2	0	1	1	0
1995–96	Luleå HF	SEL	38	8	9	17	14	13	3	3	6	6
1996–97	Luleå HF	SEL	47	15	10	25	30	9	0	2	2	4
1997–98	Luleå HF	SEL	45	7	8	15	22	3	1	0	1	4
1998–99	New York Rangers	NHL	23	0	2	2	8	—	—	—	—	—
1998–99	Hartford Wolf Pack	AHL	35	3	2	5	14	—	—	—	—	—
1998–99	Utah Grizzlies	IHL	5	0	1	1	6	—	—	—	—	—
1999–2000	Klagenfurter AC	IEHL	34	8	21	29	38	—	—	—	—	—
1999–2000	Klagenfurter AC	AUT	16	8	5	13	14	—	—	—	—	—
2000–01	Klagenfurter AC	AUT	46	11	31	42	54	—	—	—	—	—
2001–02	Klagenfurter AC	AUT	42	6	31	37	65	—	—	—	—	—
2002–03	Linköping HC	SEL	28	0	6	6	34	—	—	—	—	—
Swe-2 totals			159	24	33	57	82	19	4	1	5	18
SEL totals			158	30	33	63	100	25	4	5	9	14
AUT totals			104	25	67	92	133	—	—	—	—	—

=== International ===
Year	Team	Event	GP	G	A	Pts	PIM
1998	Sweden	WC	4	0	0	0	0
