= NHL entry draft =

Annual sport event

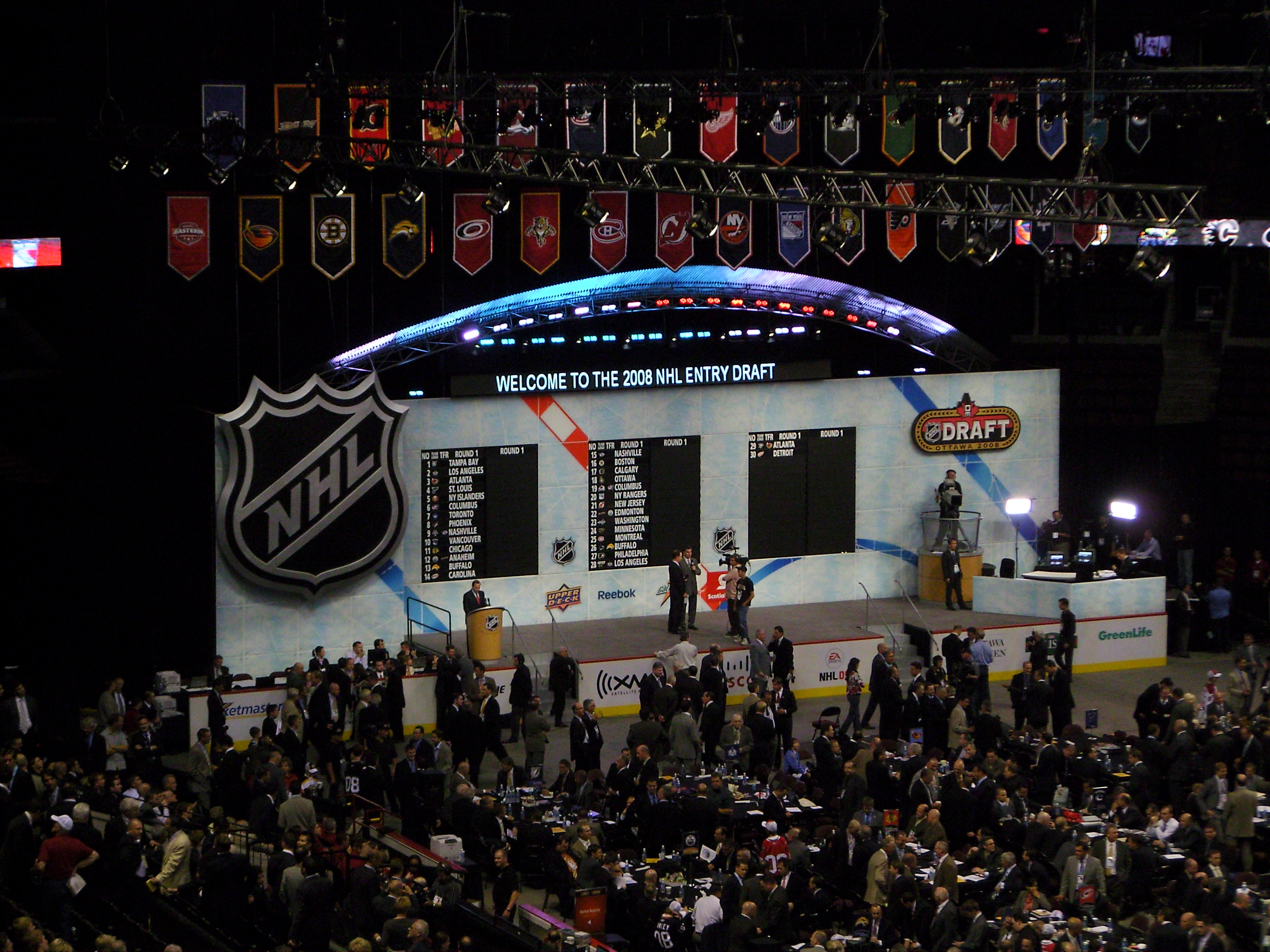
The stage at the 2008 NHL entry draft in Ottawa, Ontario

The NHL entry draft (French: Repêchage d'entrée dans la LNH) is an annual meeting in which every franchise of the National Hockey League (NHL) systematically select the rights to available ice hockey players who meet draft eligibility requirements (North American players 18–20 years old and European/international players 18–21 years old; all others enter the league as unrestricted free agents). The NHL entry draft is held once every year, generally within two to three months after the conclusion of the previous regular season. During the draft, teams take turns selecting amateur players from junior or collegiate leagues and professional players from European leagues.

The first draft was held in 1963, and has been held every year since. The NHL entry draft was known as the NHL amateur draft until 1979. The entry draft has only been a public event since 1980, and a televised event since 1984.

Up to 1994, the order was solely determined by the standings at the end of the regular season. In 1995, the NHL draft lottery was introduced where only teams who had missed the playoffs could participate. The lottery winner moved up the draft order a maximum of four places, meaning only the five worst teams, based on regular season points in a given season, could pick first in the draft, and no team in the non-playoff group could move down more than one place. The chances of winning the lottery were weighted towards the teams at the bottom of the regular season standings. From 2013 to 2015, there was no limit of moving up in the draft order, so the lottery winner would automatically receive the first overall pick, and any teams above it in the draft order would still move down one spot. From 2015 to 2020, there were three lottery winners that received the top three picks, and any teams above it in the draft order would move down no more than three spots. In 2021, the lottery system was changed to include two lottery winners, and they received the top two overall picks, and any teams above it in the draft order would move down no more than two spots.

Beginning in 2022, the two lottery winners are limited to move up no more than ten places in the draft order, meaning that only the bottom eleven teams based on regular season points, could win first pick in the draft. If a team outside the bottom eleven teams wins the first draft lottery they move up ten spots (e.g. fourteenth team wins the lottery and moves up to fourth overall) and lowest finishing team from the previous season is then awarded the first overall selection.

== History ==
The first NHL entry draft (at that time known as the "NHL amateur draft") was held on June 5, 1963, at the Queen Elizabeth Hotel in Montreal, Quebec. In 1967, NHL president Clarence Campbell and Canadian Amateur Hockey Association (CAHA) president Fred Page announced a new tentative five-year agreement on August 19, 1966, with several proposed changes to the existing system, effective July 1, 1967. The direct sponsorship of junior teams by the NHL was to be phased out in the upcoming year, and no new sponsored players could be registered or be required to sign a contract restricting movement between teams. The agreement eliminated the A, B and C forms, which had angered the parents of amateur players and were the source of legal action threats when the professional team refused to release a player. Junior-aged players became eligible for the draft once they graduate from junior hockey, or to be signed as a free agent in the year the player reaches his 20th birthday. The NHL agreed to pay development fees to the CAHA for the drafted players. The new agreement came at a time that also leveled the playing field for new NHL clubs in the 1967 NHL expansion.

The NHL briefly changed the drafting age from 20 years old to 18-year-olds in 1974, to compete with the new WHA which was allowing teams to sign underage junior players. The 20-year old rule returned for the 1975 draft.

In 1979, the rules were changed allowing players who had previously played professionally to be drafted. This rule change was made to facilitate the absorption of players from the defunct World Hockey Association. Consequently, the name of the draft was changed from "NHL amateur draft" to "NHL entry draft". The draft age was also dropped to include 19-year old "underage" players. In 1980, the age was dropped further to 18, so that any player who is between the ages of 18 and 20 is eligible to be drafted. In addition, any non-North American player over the age of 20 can be selected. From 1987 through 1991, 18 and 19-year-old players could only be drafted in the first three rounds unless they met another criterion of experience which required them to have played in major junior, U.S. college and high school, or European hockey.

In 1980, the entry draft became a public event, and was held at the Montreal Forum. Prior to that year the entry draft was conducted in Montreal hotels or league offices and was closed to the general public. The first draft outside of Montreal was held at the Metro Toronto Convention Centre in Toronto, Ontario, in 1985. Live television coverage of the draft began in 1984 when the Canadian Broadcasting Corporation covered the event in both English and French for Canadian audiences. The 1987 entry draft, held at Joe Louis Arena in Detroit, Michigan, was the first NHL draft to be held in the United States. SportsChannel America began covering the event in the United States in 1989. In 1994, the NHL Central Scouting Bureau began hosting the NHL draft combine.

Prior to the development of the draft, NHL teams sponsored junior teams, and signed prospects in their teens to the junior teams. Players were signed to one of three forms: the "A" form, which committed a player to a tryout; a "B" form, which gave the team an option to sign a player in return for a bonus; and the "C" form, which committed a player's professional rights. The "C" form could only be signed by the player at age eighteen or by the player's parents, often in exchange for some signing bonus. The first drafts (up until the 1968 amateur draft) were held to assign players who had not signed with an NHL organization before the sponsorship of junior teams was discontinued after 1968.

In October 2023, owners approved a proposal to switch the NHL Draft to a "decentralized" model in line with that of the NBA and NFL drafts, in which only prospects and team representatives will be present in-person at the Draft venue, and business would be conducted remotely from the teams' front offices. These changes are scheduled to take effect in 2025.

== Selection order and draft lottery ==
The selection order in the NHL entry draft is determined by a combination of lottery, regular season standing, and playoff results. While teams are permitted to trade draft picks both during the draft and prior to it (sometimes several years prior), in all cases, the selection order of the draft picks is based on the original holder of the pick, not a team which may have acquired the pick via a trade or other means. The order of picks discussed in this section always references the original team.

The basic order of the NHL entry draft is determined based on the standings of the teams in the previous season. As with the other major sports leagues, the basic draft order is intended to favour the teams with the weakest performance who presumably need the most improvement in their roster to compete with the other teams. Subject to the results of the NHL draft lottery (discussed below), the teams pick in the same order each round, with each team getting one pick per round. The basic order of the picks is determined as follows:

1. The teams that did not qualify for the playoffs the previous season (picks 1–16)
2. The teams that made the playoffs in the previous season but did not win either their division in the regular season or play in the Conference Finals (picks 17–24 up to 28)
3. The teams that won their divisions in the previous season but did not play in the Conference Finals (potentially picks 25–28)
4. The teams that lose in Conference Finals (picks 29 and 30)
5. The team that was the runner-up in the Stanley Cup Finals (pick 31)
6. The team that won the Stanley Cup in the previous season (pick 32)

The number of teams in the second and third group depends on whether the Conference finalists also won their division. The teams in each group (other than the Stanley Cup winner and runner up) are ordered within that group based on their point totals in the preceding regular season (with the lowest point total picking first). Tie-breakers are governed by the same rules used to determine ties in the regular season standings. The order of picks 1–16 may change during the first round of the draft based on the results of the NHL draft lottery. In the subsequent rounds, the basic order based on point totals is used.

When teams lose their rights to a first-round draft choice, because that player was not signed to a contract and consequently re-entered the entry draft or became an unrestricted free agent, they are awarded a compensatory draft pick. This selection will be the same numerical choice as the first round draft pick who was not signed, but in the second round. For example, if a team cannot sign the seventh overall first round draft choice, it will receive the seventh pick in the second round of the next draft as compensation.

=== Draft lottery ===
At the conclusion of the regular season, the 16 teams that did not qualify for the playoffs are entered in a weighted lottery to determine the initial draft picks in the first round. The teams are seeded in the basic draft order based on their regular season point totals. The odds of winning the lottery are weighted on a descending scale that gives the greatest chance of winning to the team with the lowest point total (18.5%), and the worst chance to the team with the highest point total (1.0%).

The prize for winning the draft lottery is to be upgraded to the highest eligible pick in the first round of the draft, with each team that preceded the winner in the basic draft order bumped one pick lower. For example, if the team with the 5th worst point total wins the lottery, it would pick first, and the teams with the worst through 4th-worst records would pick second through fifth. The remaining teams would be unaffected. The teams would return to the basic order for the second and all subsequent rounds.

From its inception through 2015, there was one winner of the lottery; from 1995 to 2012, the team that won the draft lottery moved up no more than four positions in the draft order. If the winner of the lottery was among the five worst teams in a given season, that team won the first pick in the draft. Otherwise, the team will move up no more than four spots, and that team will not receive the first pick in the draft; from 2013 to 2015 the lottery winner received the first pick overall regardless of regular season point totals amongst the non-playoff teams. Beginning with the 2016 draft and lasting until the 2020 draft, the first three selections were determined by the lottery. Any team that did not make the playoffs had a weighted chance to be selected in the first, second, or third slot. Beginning in 2021, only two draws will be held for the first two selections. Starting with the 2022 lottery; the teams winning one of the two lotteries will only be allowed to move up a maximum of ten spots in the draft order, and teams will only be allowed to advance in the draft order because of winning a lottery twice in five years. The two-in-five-years rule only applies to teams jumping up in the draft order. This means the team with the worst record can win any lottery selection an unlimited number of times while the second-worst can do the same for the second overall pick only. The remaining teams maintains their order of selection based on the points accrued the previous season. As the lottery determines the top two slots, no team can drop more than two places from the position established based on previous season point totals.

The NHL draft lottery takes place just before or during the Stanley Cup playoffs and is hosted at the NHL Network's studios in Secaucus, New Jersey, from 2020 onwards. The draft lottery previously took place at Sportsnet's studios in Toronto from 2015 to 2019, and at TSN's studios in Toronto from 2006 to 2014.

The odds for the first overall pick are determined as follows:

Draft position odds (2000–12)
Finish in previous season	1st	2nd	3rd	4th	5th	6th	7th	8th	9th	10th	11th	12th	13th	14th
30th	48.2%	51.2%												
29th	18.8%	42.0%	39.2%											
28th	14.2%		56.1%	29.7%										
27th	10.7%			66.7%	22.6%									
26th	8.1%				74.7%	17.2%								
25th		6.2%				72.7%	19.6%							
24th			4.7%				81.1%	14.2%						
23rd				3.6%				87.2%	9.2%					
22nd					2.7%				91.6%	5.7%				
21st						2.1%				94.8%	3.1%			
20th							1.5%				80.6%	16.6%		
19th								1.1%				88.0%	9.3%	
18th									0.8%				98.7%	0.5%
17th										0.5%				99.5%

Draft position odds (2013–14)
Finish in previous season	1st	2nd	3rd	4th	5th	6th	7th	8th	9th	10th	11th	12th	13th	14th
30th	25.0%	75.0%												
29th	18.8%	25.0%	56.2%											
28th	14.2%		43.8%	42.0%										
27th	10.7%			58.0%	31.3%									
26th	8.1%				68.7%	23.2%								
25th	6.2%					76.8%	17.0%							
24th	4.7%						83.0%	12.3%						
23rd	3.6%							87.7%	8.7%					
22nd	2.7%								91.3%	6.0%				
21st	2.1%									94.0%	3.9%			
20th	1.5%										80.4%	18.1%		
19th	1.1%											86.0%	12.9%	
18th	0.8%												94.7%	3.2%
17th	0.5%													99.5%

Draft position odds (2015)
Finish in previous season	1st	2nd	3rd	4th	5th	6th	7th	8th	9th	10th	11th	12th	13th	14th
30th	20.0%	80.0%												
29th	13.5%	20.0%	66.5%											
28th	11.5%		33.5%	55.0%										
27th	9.5%			45.0%	45.5%									
26th	8.5%				9.1%	35.5%								
25th	7.5%					63.0%	29.5%							
24th	6.5%						70.5%	23.0%						
23rd	6.0%							77.0%	17.0%					
22nd	5.0%								83.0%	12.0%				
21st	3.5%									88.0%	8.5%			
20th	3.0%										91.5%	5.5%		
19th	2.5%											94.5%	3.0%	
18th	2.0%												97.0%	1.0%
17th	1.0%													99.0%

Draft position odds (2016–2017)
Finish in previous season	1st	2nd	3rd	4th	5th	6th	7th	8th	9th	10th	11th	12th	13th	14th
30th	20.0%	17.5%	15.0%	47.5%										
29th	13.5%	13.1%	12.5%	35.2%	25.8%									
28th	11.5%	11.4%	11.3%	14.2%	37.8%	13.8%								
27th	9.5%	9.7%	9.8%	3.15%	27.3%	33.2%	7.4%							
26th	8.5%	8.8%	9.0%		9.1%	35.5%	25.5%	3.7%						
25th	7.5%	7.8%	8.1%			17.5%	39.3%	17.9%	1.7%					
24th	6.5%	6.9%	7.2%				27.9%	39.1%	11.7%	0.7%				
23rd	6.0%	6.4%	6.8%					39.2%	34.8%	6.6%	0.3%			
22nd	5.0%	5.4%	5.8%						51.8%	28.6%	3.4%	0.1%		
21st	3.5%	3.8%	4.2%							64.0%	22.8%	1.6%	0.1%	
20th	3.0%	3.3%	3.6%								73.5%	15.9%	0.6%	0.1%
19th	2.5%	2.7%	3.0%									82.3%	9.2%	0.1%
18th	2.0%	2.2%	2.4%										90.1%	3.2%
17th	1.0%	1.1%	1.2%											96.6%

Draft position odds (2017–2021)
Finish in previous season	1st	2nd	3rd	4th	5th	6th	7th	8th	9th	10th	11th	12th	13th	14th	15th
31st	18.5%	16.5%	14.4%	50.6%											
30th	13.5%	13.0%	12.3%	33.3%	27.9%										
29th	11.5%	11.3%	11.1%	13.2%	37.7%	15.2%									
28th	9.5%	9.6%	9.7%	2.8%	26.1%	34.0%	8.3%								
27th	8.5%	8.7%	8.9%		8.4%	34.5%	26.7%	4.3%							
26th	7.5%	7.8%	8.0%			16.3%	38.9%	19.4%	2.1%						
25th	6.5%	6.8%	7.1%				26.0%	39.5%	13.1%	1.0%					
24th	6.0%	6.3%	6.7%					36.8%	36.0%	7.8%	0.4%				
23rd	5.0%	5.3%	5.7%						48.8%	30.7%	4.3%	0.1%			
22nd	3.5%	3.8%	4.1%							60.5%	25.7%	2.4%	<0.1%		
21st	3.0%	3.3%	3.6%								69.6%	19.4%	1.1%	<0.1%	
20th	2.5%	2.7%	3.0%									78.0%	13.3%	0.4%	<0.1%
19th	2.0%	2.2%	2.4%										85.5%	7.8%	0.1%
18th	1.5%	1.7%	1.8%											91.8%	3.2%
17th	1.0%	1.1%	1.2%												96.7%

Draft position odds (2022–)
Finish in previous season	1st	2nd	3rd	4th	5th	6th	7th	8th	9th	10th	11th	12th	13th	14th	15th	16th
32nd	25.5%	18.8%	55.7%													
31st	13.5%	14.4%	32.0%	40.2%												
30th	11.5%	11.5%	7.4%	40.7%	28.8%											
29th	9.5%	9.8%		15.4%	44.9%	20.5%										
28th	8.5%	8.8%			24.5%	44.2%	13.9%									
27th	7.5%	7.9%				34.1%	41.4%	9.1%								
26th	6.5%	6.9%					44.4%	36.5%	5.6%							
25th	6.0%	6.4%						54.4%	30.0%	3.2%						
24th	5.0%	5.4%							64.4%	23.5%	1.7%					
23rd	3.5%	3.8%								73.3%	18.4%	0.9%				
22nd	3.0%	3.3%									79.9%	13.4%	0.5%			
21st		5.3%										85.7%	8.9%	0.2%		
20th			4.3%										90.7%	5.1%	<0.1%	
19th				3.1%										94.7%	2.1%	<0.1%
18th					1.1%										97.9%	1.1%
17th						1.0%										98.9%

== Eligible players ==
All players who will be 18 years old on or before September 15 and not older than 20 years old before December 31 of the draft year are eligible for selection for that year's NHL Entry Draft. In addition, non-North American players aged 21 are eligible.

== List of NHL entry drafts ==
Draft	Location	City	Date	Rounds	Total drafted	No. 1 pick
1963	Queen Elizabeth Hotel	Montreal, Quebec	June 5, 1963	4	21	Garry Monahan (Montreal Canadiens)
1964	Queen Elizabeth Hotel	Montreal, Quebec	June 11, 1964	4	24	Claude Gauthier (Detroit Red Wings)
1965	Queen Elizabeth Hotel	Montreal, Quebec	April 27, 1965	3	11	Andre Veilleux (New York Rangers)
1966	Mount Royal Hotel	Montreal, Quebec	April 25, 1966	4	24	Barry Gibbs (Boston Bruins)
1967	Queen Elizabeth Hotel	Montreal, Quebec	July 7, 1967	3	18	Rick Pagnutti (Los Angeles Kings)
1968	Queen Elizabeth Hotel	Montreal, Quebec	June 13, 1968	3	24	Michel Plasse (Montreal Canadiens)
1969	Queen Elizabeth Hotel	Montreal, Quebec	June 11, 1969	10	84	Rejean Houle (Montreal Canadiens)
1970	Queen Elizabeth Hotel	Montreal, Quebec	June 11, 1970	13	115	Gilbert Perreault (Buffalo Sabres)
1971	Queen Elizabeth Hotel	Montreal, Quebec	June 10, 1971	15	117	Guy Lafleur (Montreal Canadiens)
1972	Queen Elizabeth Hotel	Montreal, Quebec	June 8, 1972	11	152	Billy Harris (New York Islanders)
1973	Mount Royal Hotel	Montreal, Quebec	May 15, 1973	13	168	Denis Potvin (New York Islanders)
1974	NHL Montreal Office	Montreal, Quebec	May 28, 1974	25	247	Greg Joly (Washington Capitals)
1975	NHL Montreal Office	Montreal, Quebec	June 3, 1975	18	217	Mel Bridgman (Philadelphia Flyers)
1976	NHL Montreal Office	Montreal, Quebec	June 1, 1976	15	135	Rick Green (Washington Capitals)
1977	NHL Montreal Office	Montreal, Quebec	June 14, 1977	17	185	Dale McCourt (Detroit Red Wings)
1978	Queen Elizabeth Hotel	Montreal, Quebec	June 15, 1978	22	234	Bobby Smith (Minnesota North Stars)
1979	Queen Elizabeth Hotel	Montreal, Quebec	August 9, 1979	6	126	Rob Ramage (Colorado Rockies)
1980	Montreal Forum	Montreal, Quebec	June 11, 1980	10	210	Doug Wickenheiser (Montreal Canadiens)
1981	Montreal Forum	Montreal, Quebec	June 10, 1981	11	211	Dale Hawerchuk (Winnipeg Jets)
1982	Montreal Forum	Montreal, Quebec	June 9, 1982	12	252	Gord Kluzak (Boston Bruins)
1983	Montreal Forum	Montreal, Quebec	June 8, 1983	12	242	Brian Lawton (Minnesota North Stars)
1984	Montreal Forum	Montreal, Quebec	June 9, 1984	12	250	Mario Lemieux (Pittsburgh Penguins)
1985	Toronto Convention Centre	Toronto, Ontario	June 15, 1985	12	252	Wendel Clark (Toronto Maple Leafs)
1986	Montreal Forum	Montreal, Quebec	June 21, 1986	12	252	Joe Murphy (Detroit Red Wings)
1987	Joe Louis Arena	Detroit, Michigan	June 13, 1987	12	252	Pierre Turgeon (Buffalo Sabres)
1988	Montreal Forum	Montreal, Quebec	June 11, 1988	12	252	Mike Modano (Minnesota North Stars)
1989	Met Center	Bloomington, Minnesota	June 17, 1989	12	252	Mats Sundin (Quebec Nordiques)
1990	BC Place	Vancouver, British Columbia	June 16, 1990	12	250	Owen Nolan (Quebec Nordiques)
1991	Buffalo Memorial Auditorium	Buffalo, New York	June 22, 1991	12	264	Eric Lindros (Quebec Nordiques)
1992	Montreal Forum	Montreal, Quebec	June 20, 1992	11	264	Roman Hamrlik (Tampa Bay Lightning)
1993	Colisée de Québec	Quebec City, Quebec	June 26–27, 1993	11	286	Alexandre Daigle (Ottawa Senators)
1994	Hartford Civic Center	Hartford, Connecticut	June 28, 1994	11	286	Ed Jovanovski (Florida Panthers)
1995	Edmonton Coliseum	Edmonton, Alberta	July 8, 1995	9	234	Bryan Berard (Ottawa Senators)
1996	Kiel Center	St. Louis, Missouri	June 22, 1996	9	241	Chris Phillips (Ottawa Senators)
1997	Civic Arena	Pittsburgh, Pennsylvania	June 21, 1997	9	246	Joe Thornton (Boston Bruins)
1998	Marine Midland Arena	Buffalo, New York	June 27, 1998	9	258	Vincent Lecavalier (Tampa Bay Lightning)
1999	FleetCenter	Boston, Massachusetts	June 26, 1999	9	272	Patrik Stefan (Atlanta Thrashers)
2000	Canadian Airlines Saddledome	Calgary, Alberta	June 24–25, 2000	9	293	Rick DiPietro (New York Islanders)
2001	National Car Rental Center	Sunrise, Florida	June 23–24, 2001	9	289	Ilya Kovalchuk (Atlanta Thrashers)
2002	Air Canada Centre	Toronto, Ontario	June 22–23, 2002	9	290	Rick Nash (Columbus Blue Jackets)
2003	Gaylord Entertainment Center	Nashville, Tennessee	June 21–22, 2003	9	292	Marc-Andre Fleury (Pittsburgh Penguins)
2004	RBC Center	Raleigh, North Carolina	June 26–27, 2004	9	291	Alexander Ovechkin (Washington Capitals)
2005	Westin Hotel Ottawa^{1}	Ottawa, Ontario	July 30, 2005	7	230	Sidney Crosby (Pittsburgh Penguins)
2006	General Motors Place	Vancouver, British Columbia	June 24, 2006	7	213	Erik Johnson (St. Louis Blues)
2007	Nationwide Arena	Columbus, Ohio	June 22–23, 2007	7	211	Patrick Kane (Chicago Blackhawks)
2008	Scotiabank Place	Ottawa, Ontario	June 20–21, 2008	7	211	Steven Stamkos (Tampa Bay Lightning)
2009	Bell Centre	Montreal, Quebec	June 26–27, 2009	7	211	John Tavares (New York Islanders)
2010	Staples Center	Los Angeles, California	June 25–26, 2010	7	210	Taylor Hall (Edmonton Oilers)
2011	Xcel Energy Center	St. Paul, Minnesota	June 24–25, 2011	7	211	Ryan Nugent-Hopkins (Edmonton Oilers)
2012	Consol Energy Center	Pittsburgh, Pennsylvania	June 22–23, 2012	7	211	Nail Yakupov (Edmonton Oilers)
2013	Prudential Center	Newark, New Jersey	June 30, 2013	7	211	Nathan MacKinnon (Colorado Avalanche)
2014	Wells Fargo Center	Philadelphia, Pennsylvania	June 27–28, 2014	7	210	Aaron Ekblad (Florida Panthers)
2015	BB&T Center	Sunrise, Florida	June 26–27, 2015	7	211	Connor McDavid (Edmonton Oilers)
2016	First Niagara Center	Buffalo, New York	June 24–25, 2016	7	211	Auston Matthews (Toronto Maple Leafs)
2017	United Center	Chicago, Illinois	June 23–24, 2017	7	217	Nico Hischier (New Jersey Devils)
2018	American Airlines Center	Dallas, Texas	June 22–23, 2018	7	217	Rasmus Dahlin (Buffalo Sabres)
2019	Rogers Arena	Vancouver, British Columbia	June 21–22, 2019	7	217	Jack Hughes (New Jersey Devils)
2020	NHL Network studios^{2}	Secaucus, New Jersey	October 6–7, 2020	7	216^{3}	Alexis Lafreniere (New York Rangers)
2021	NHL Network studios^{2}	Secaucus, New Jersey	July 23–24, 2021	7	223^{3}	Owen Power (Buffalo Sabres)
2022	Bell Centre	Montreal, Quebec	July 7–8, 2022	7	225	Juraj Slafkovsky (Montreal Canadiens)
2023	Bridgestone Arena	Nashville, Tennessee	June 28–29, 2023	7	224	Connor Bedard (Chicago Blackhawks)
2024	Sphere	Paradise, Nevada	June 28–29, 2024	7	225	Macklin Celebrini (San Jose Sharks)
2025	Peacock Theater	Los Angeles, California	June 27–28, 2025	7	224	Matthew Schaefer (New York Islanders)
2026	KeyBank Center	Buffalo, New York	June 26–27, 2026	7	224	Gavin McKenna (Toronto Maple Leafs)

Notes

1. Originally scheduled to be hosted at Corel Centre; venue location changed due to scheduling conflict related to the league's CBA negotiations that ended the 2004–05 lockout.
2. Originally scheduled to be hosted at the Bell Centre in Montreal, Quebec, from June 26–27 before the season was suspended after March 11, 2020, due to the COVID-19 pandemic; draft was held via conference call as a result. The 2021 draft was also held via conference call due to the pandemic.
3. The Arizona Coyotes forfeited their 2020 second-round pick as the result of a penalty due to violations of the NHL Combine Testing Policy during the 2019–20 NHL season. They also forfeited their 2021 first-round pick.

== Broadcasting ==
SportsChannel America began covering the NHL draft in the United States with the 1989 NHL entry draft being the first NHL draft ever televised.

Currently the rights to the draft are held by ESPN, Sportsnet, TVA Sports and the NHL Network which only broadcasts the second to last round of the draft.

Formerly the rights to the drafts were held by NBC Sports and were aired on NBCSN (formerly known as Versus from 2006 to 2011).

== See also ==
- KHL Junior Draft
- List of first overall NHL draft picks
- List of undrafted NHL players with 100 games played
- Taro Tsujimoto
