= Barrington High School (Rhode Island) =

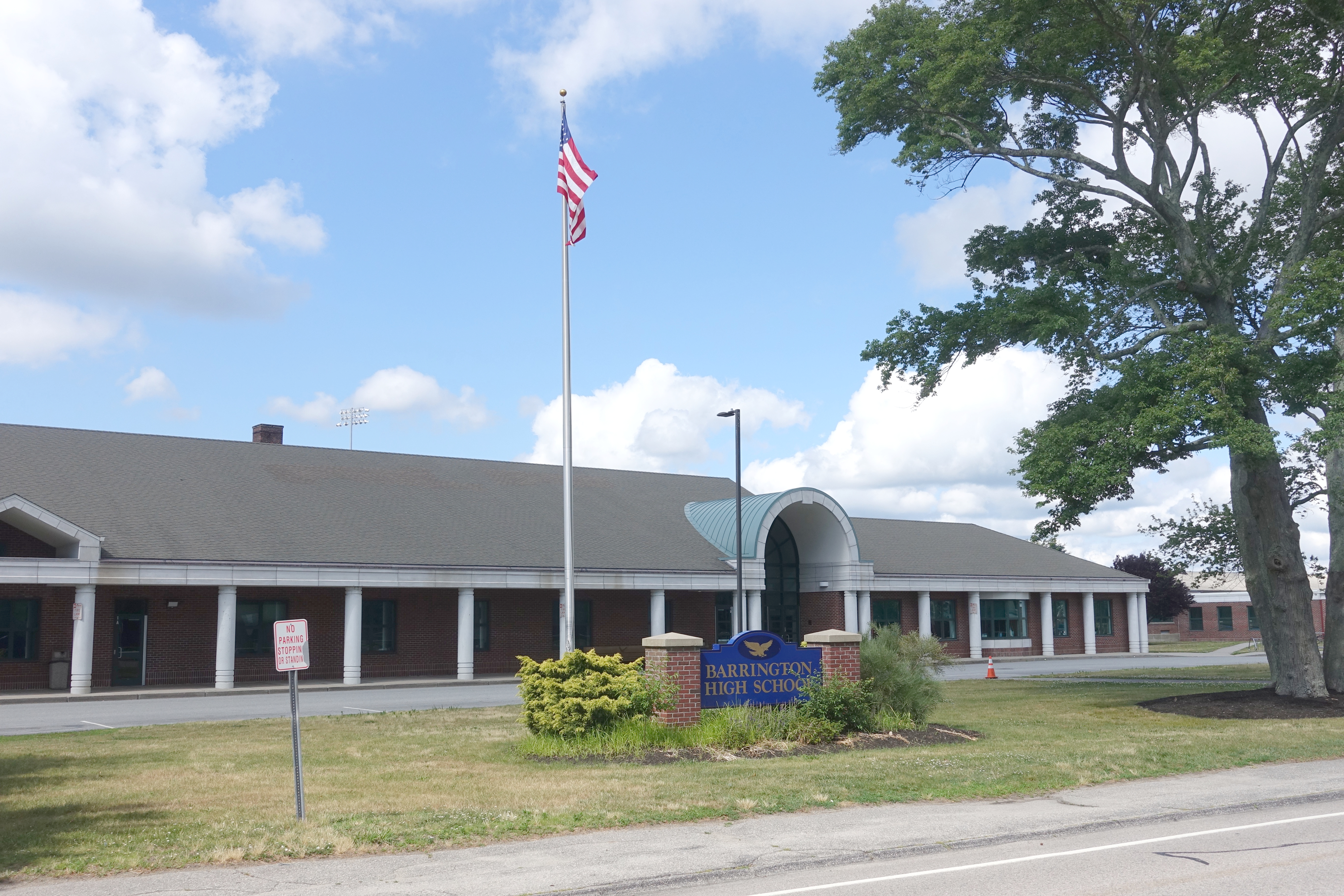
- Barrington High School

Location
- 220 Lincoln Avenue; Barrington, Rhode Island 02806; United States
- 41°44′50″N 71°19′13″W

Information
- Type: Public high school
- Established: 1951
- School district: Barrington Public Schools
- Superintendent: Robert Wargo
- CEEB code: 400000
- Principal: Chris Ashley
- Teaching staff: 84.00 (FTE)
- Grades: 9–12
- Gender: coed
- Enrollment: 1,101 (2023–2024)
- Student to teacher ratio: 13.11
- Campus size: 28 acres (11 ha)
- Campus type: Suburban
- Color
- Mascot: American Bald Eagle (Girls' Sports are Denoted Lady Eagles)
- Newspaper: The Talon
- Yearbook: The Arrow
- Feeder schools: Barrington Middle School
- Website: School website

Barrington High School (formerly known as West Barrington Senior High School) is a public high school located in Barrington, a town in Bristol County, Rhode Island. Barrington High School is the only high school of the Barrington Public Schools district, enrolling 1028 students in grades 9-12. Barrington High School's school colors are blue and gold, and its mascot is the Eagle.

During the early 1950s, Barrington's population began to grow as a result of the increasing availability of the automobile and the baby boom. Barrington High School was the first of many public schools constructed during this period to accommodate the now larger populace.

Barrington High School has been noted for academic success; Niche ranks Barrington as the best public high school in Rhode Island. In its 2014 list of "America's Top High Schools", Newsweek ranked Barrington High School as No. 200 out of an analysis of 500 schools across the United States. Beginning in 2017, the school began implementing a "de-leveling" program which removed advanced courses and ultimately all honors programs. Thereafter, the school's academic rating dropped precipitously in the U.S. News & World Report, to #308 in 2022. As a result of parents' pushback against this, the school reversed course and said honors programs will be reinstated in the 2022–2023 school year.

== History ==
=== Leander R. Peck Memorial School ===
In 1870, a Brown University alumnus named Isaac F. Cady established the Prince Hill Family and Day School. After the school closed in 1880, the now unused building was put to use as the first public school of Barrington in 1884; the school later moved to the recently constructed town hall in 1888. In 1916, the grounds for a new high school were donated by Sarah Gould Peck in memory of her late husband, Leander R. Peck, a wealthy wool salesman and longtime Barrington resident. After a year of construction, Leander R. Peck Memorial School was opened on September 14, 1917. The Leander R. Peck Memorial School was used as Barrington's high school from 1917 until 1951, expanded in 1925 and again in 1935.

=== Barrington High School ===
During the 1950s, Barrington's population grew as a result of the post-World War II baby boom and the increasing availability of the automobile. To facilitate the education of this increased population, new public schools were constructed throughout the 1950s. Barrington High School was constructed in 1951, the first of the modern Barrington public schools. (Note: Sources vary as to the exact year of Barrington High School's construction. Both Historical and Architectural Resources of Barrington, Rhode Island and the Town of Barrington website claim 1951, whereas a report by the NEASC claims it was constructed in 1952. This article uses the date given by the Town of Barrington, which maintains a chronological history on its website.) In 1964, a construction project doubled the size of the original building; twenty years later, the library was expanded in addition to renovation of the art and science rooms. In 1999, the school completed a $14.25 million (equivalent to $28 million in 2025) expansion/renovation project, which included new classrooms, administration and guidance offices, a renovated auditorium, and several other expansions/renovations throughout the building.

== Academics ==
=== Awards ===
Barrington High School has been deemed a National Blue Ribbon School, and has received a gold rating from U.S News & World Report. In 2014, Newsweek ranked Barrington High School as No. 200 in an analysis of 14,454 U.S. schools based on graduation rates, SAT scores, and AP participation rates.

=== Enrollment ===
As of the 2023–2024 school year, Barrington High School enrolls 1119 students and 83 faculty members: a student-teacher ratio of, roughly, 13:1. The student body of Barrington High School is mostly White, with a 7.2% Asian minority. Latino, African-American, and multiracial students together comprise about 10% of the student body.

Ethnicity	Percentage of student body
White	82.1%
Asian	7.2%
African-American	1.7%
Hispanic	3.9%
Multiracial	4.7%

== Athletics ==
As of 2014, Barrington High School offered 20 varsity sports for boys and 3 varsity sports for girls. Run under the Barrington Boosters, these sports include cross country, soccer, football, field hockey, cheerleading, tennis, volleyball, swimming, track and field, basketball, wrestling, ice hockey, baseball, lacrosse, and softball. Barrington High School participates in the Rhode Island Interscholastic League and has won several championships since 2008.

== Notable alumni ==
- Brad Faxon, PGA graduated from the school in 1979.
- Shanna Moakler, Former Miss USA and Playboy Magazine model, graduated from Barrington High School in 1993.
- Jay Pattee, college football and basketball coach, graduated in 1939.
- Brett Quigley, PGA professional golfer, graduated from Barrington High School in 1987.
