= Curly Oden =

American football player (1899–1978)

No. 2, 12
- Positions: Running back; Punt returner

Personal information
- Born: May 10, 1899; Stockholm, Sweden
- Died: August 3, 1978 (aged 79); Cranston, Rhode Island, U.S.
- Listed height: 5 ft 6 in (1.68 m)
- Listed weight: 163 lb (74 kg)

Career information
- High school: Classical (Cranston, Rhode Island)
- College: Brown

Career history
- Providence Steam Roller (1925–1931); Boston Braves (1932)

Awards and highlights
- NFL champion (1928); 2× Second-team All-Pro (1926, 1928)
- Stats at Pro Football Reference

Olaf Gustave Hazard "Curly" Oden (May 10, 1899 – August 3, 1978) was an American football running back and punt returner in the National Football League (NFL) for the Providence Steam Roller and the Boston Braves.

== Biography ==
A native of Stockholm, Sweden, Oden attended Classical High School in Providence, Rhode Island, where he captained the school's ice hockey team in 1917, and remained a fixture in Rhode Island hockey throughout the 1920s. He played college football at Brown University, scoring eight touchdowns and passing for five more as a senior. Also a star shortstop, Oden was invited to a tryout for the major league Brooklyn Robins. He graduated from Brown in 1921, and was inducted into the university's athletic hall of fame in 1971.

In 1921, Brown head coach Harry Pattee honored Oden as the godfather for his son, Jay Pattee.

Oden's NFL career began with Providence in 1925, and he soon became a star player. He was a member of the Steam Roller's 1928 league championship squad, and played with Providence through 1931. He played a single game with the NFL's Boston Braves in 1932, his final professional season. In his career, Oden rushed for eight touchdowns, caught four more in the air, passed for two, and scored five on kickoff and punt returns, a league record at the time.

From 1926 to 1928, Oden played summer baseball for Falmouth in the Cape Cod Baseball League. An all-league shortstop who also managed the team in 1927 and 1928, Oden was known for his "timely hitting and accurate throwing," and was "the king of the base stealers in the league," having "thrilled the crowds on several occasions by stealing home."
