= List of first overall NHL draft picks =

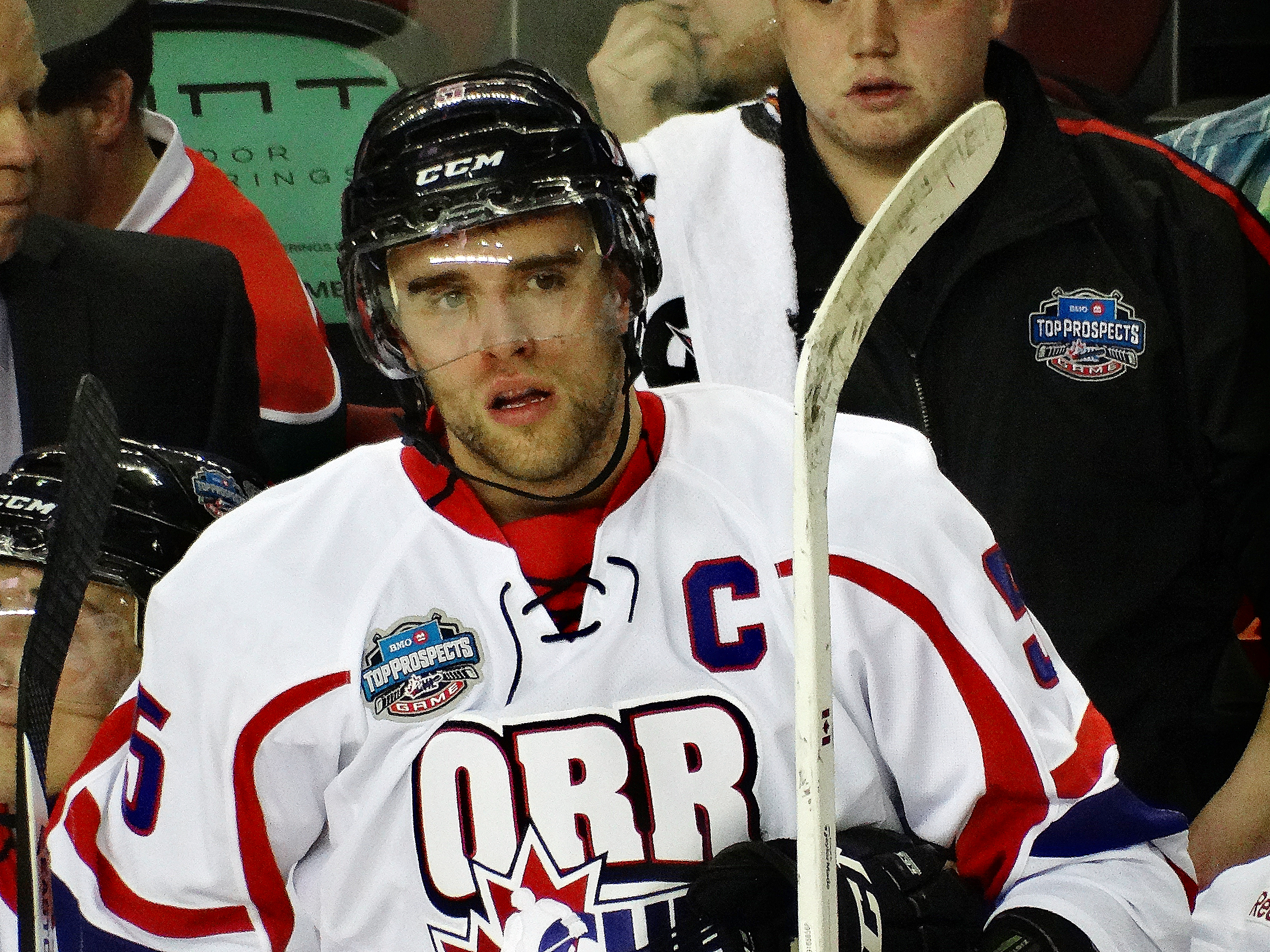
Aaron Ekblad, the first player taken in the 2014 NHL entry draft.

The NHL entry draft, originally known as the NHL amateur draft, is a collective meeting in which the franchises of the National Hockey League (NHL) systematically select the exclusive rights to available amateur players who meet the eligibility requirements to play professional hockey in the NHL. First held in 1963, the draft prior to 1969 was a shorter affair. Any amateur player who was aged 17 years and older and was not already sponsored by an NHL club was eligible to be drafted. In 1969 the rules were changed so that any amateur player between the ages of 17 and 20 was eligible to be drafted. The draft has grown, and in 2021, 223 players were selected over seven rounds.

A total of 62 different players have been selected first. Of those, 45 have been Canadian, eight American, three Russian, two Czech, two Swedish, one Slovak and one Swiss. Every first overall pick taken between 1968 and 2016 has played in at least 299 NHL games. Three players retired without having played an NHL game.

The Montreal Canadiens have had the most first overall picks of any other team, selecting six players first overall since 1963. The Anaheim Ducks, Calgary Flames, Carolina Hurricanes, Minnesota Wild, Nashville Predators, Seattle Kraken, Vancouver Canucks and Vegas Golden Knights have never selected first overall. Five players have come from the London Knights of the Ontario Hockey League, more than any other team. Thirteen players have won the Calder Memorial Trophy as the NHL's rookie of the year: Gilbert Perreault, Denis Potvin, Bobby Smith, Dale Hawerchuk, Mario Lemieux, Bryan Berard, Alexander Ovechkin, Patrick Kane, Nathan MacKinnon, Aaron Ekblad, Auston Matthews, Connor Bedard, and Matthew Schaefer. Ten have been inducted into the Hockey Hall of Fame: Perreault, Potvin, Guy Lafleur, Eric Lindros, Hawerchuk, Lemieux, Pierre Turgeon, Joe Thornton, Mats Sundin and Mike Modano.

== First overall picks ==
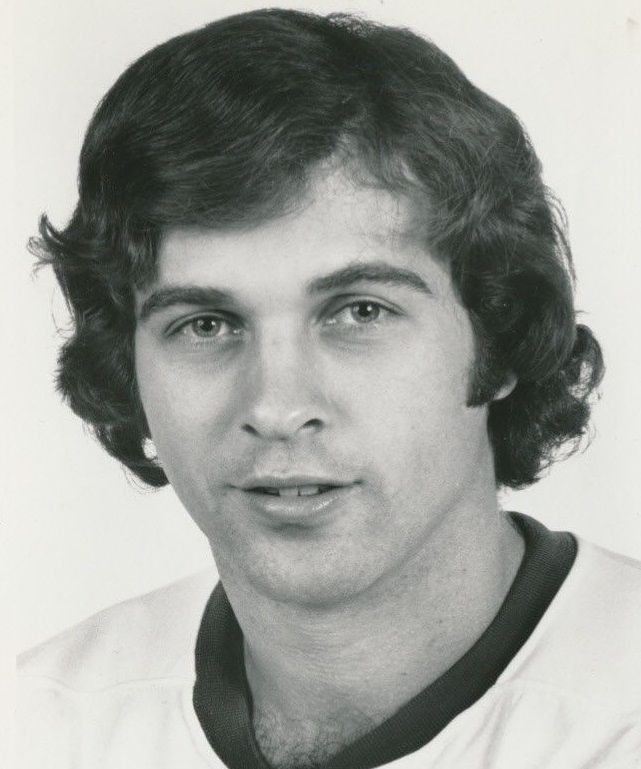
Billy Harris, drafted by the New York Islanders in 1972.

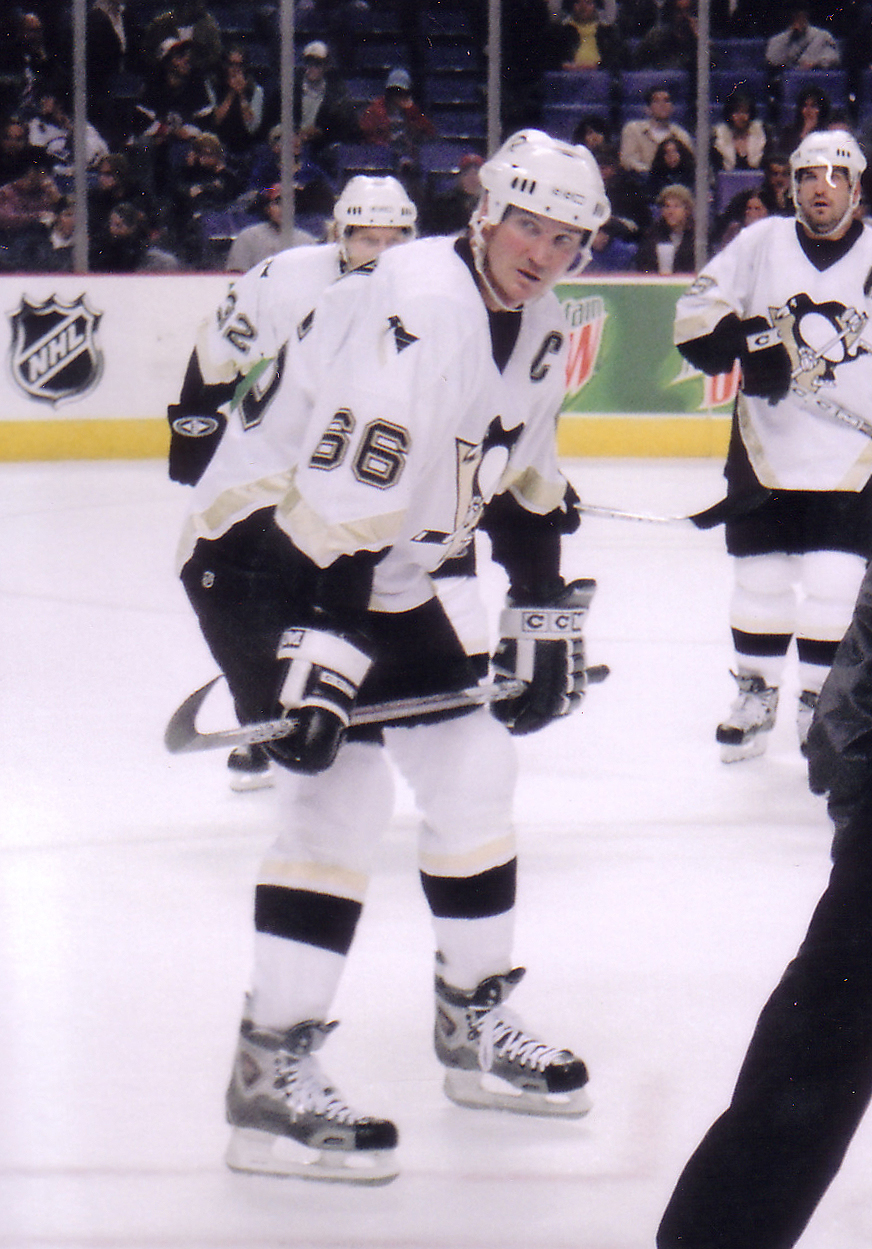
Mario Lemieux, drafted by the Pittsburgh Penguins in 1984.

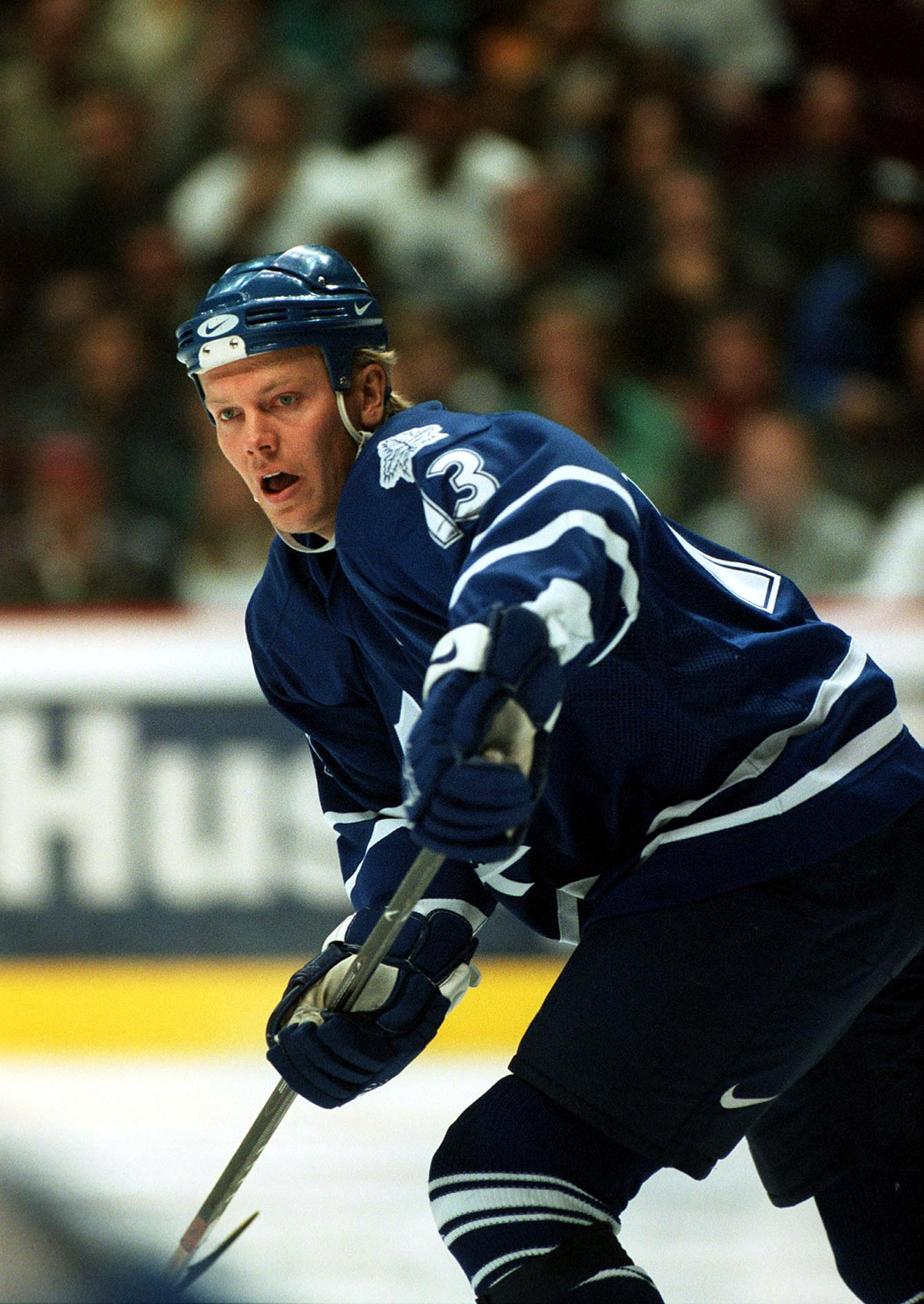
Mats Sundin, drafted by the Quebec Nordiques in 1989, the first European player to be picked first overall.

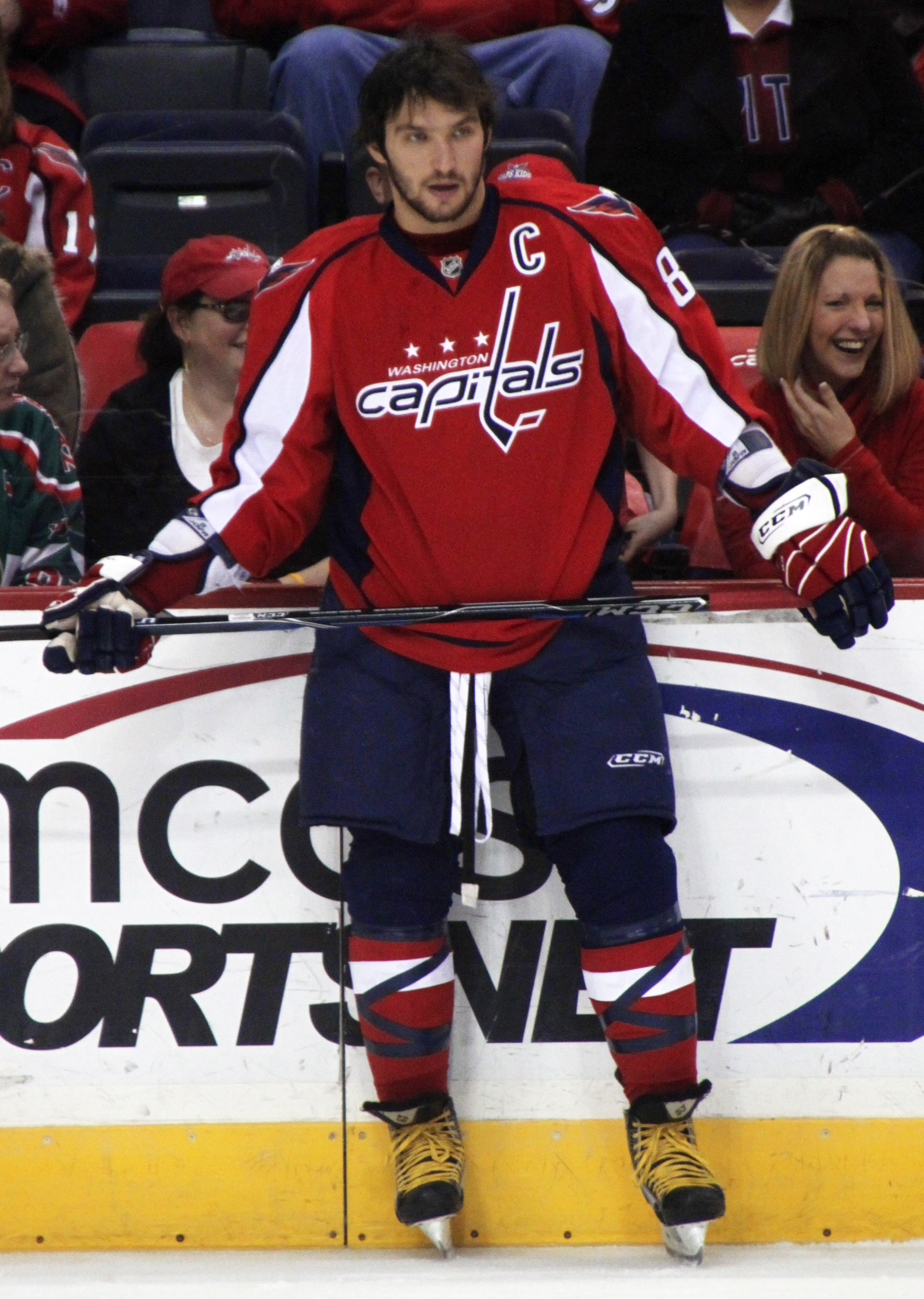
Alexander Ovechkin, drafted by the Washington Capitals in 2004.

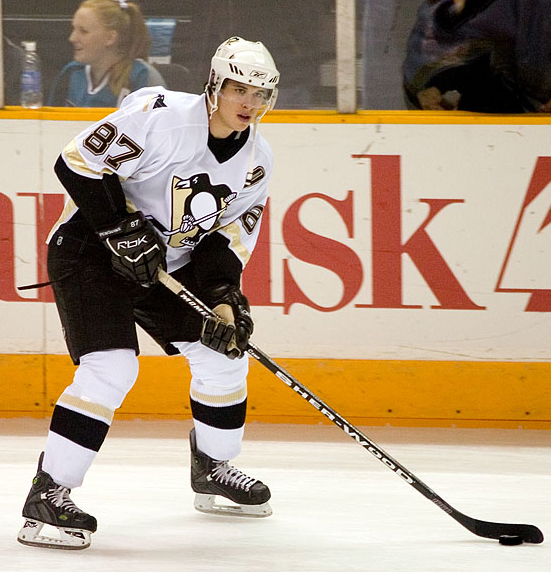
Sidney Crosby, drafted by the Pittsburgh Penguins in 2005.

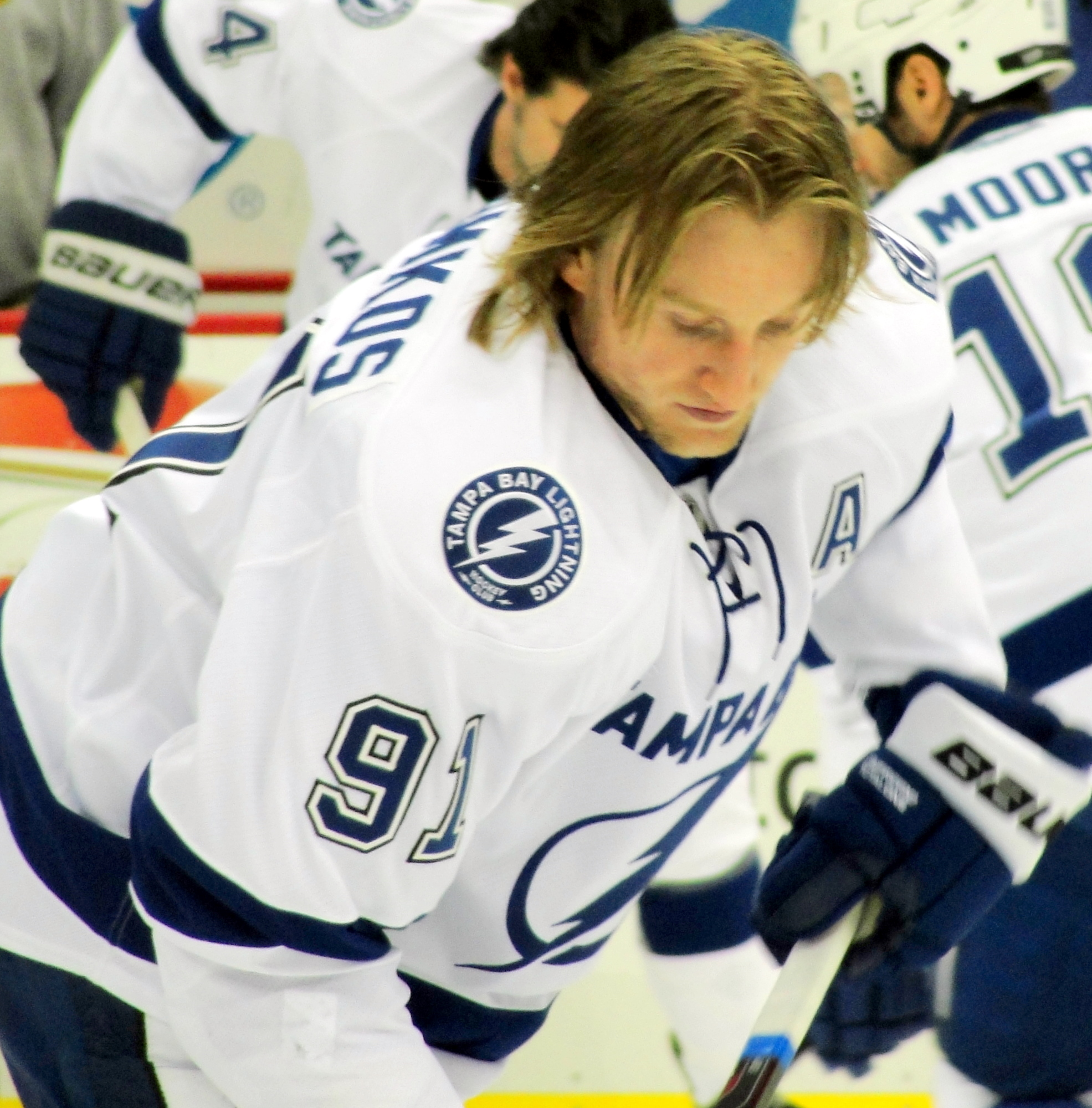
Steven Stamkos, drafted by the Tampa Bay Lightning in 2008.

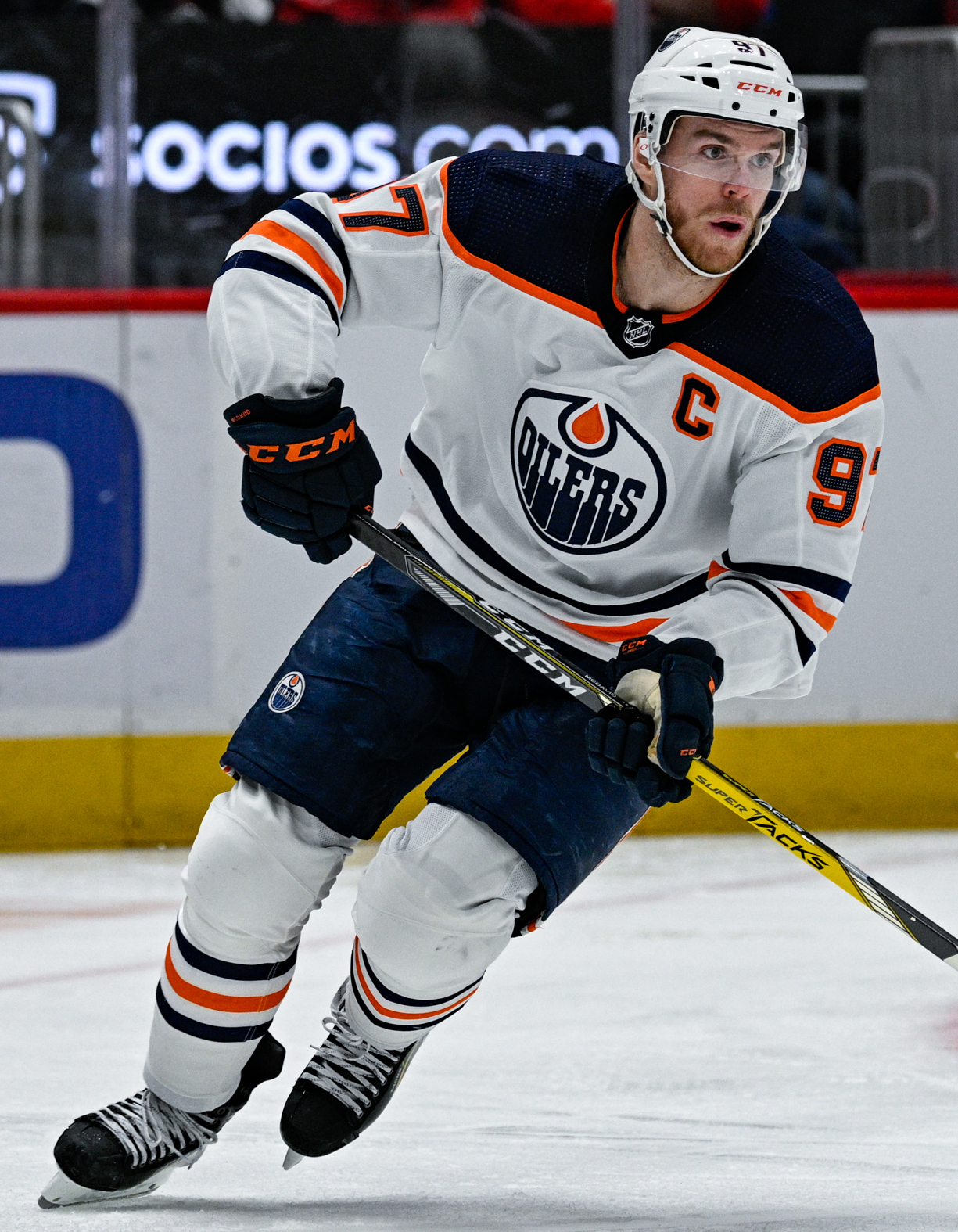
Connor McDavid, drafted by the Edmonton Oilers in 2015.

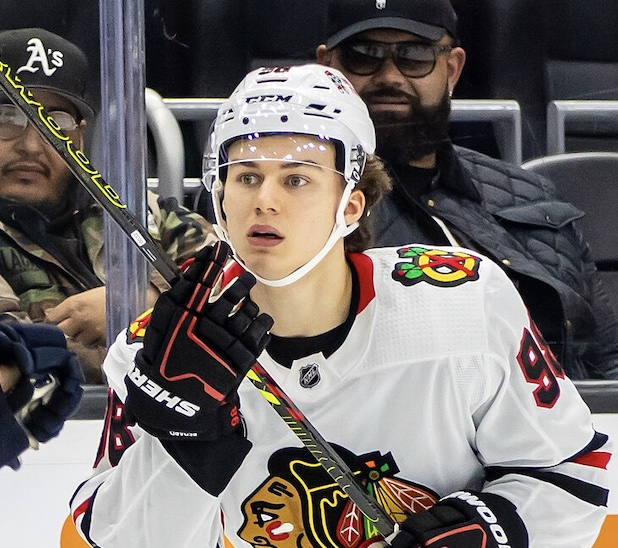
Connor Bedard, drafted by the Chicago Blackhawks in 2023.

Key

bold	Active in the NHL
^{‡}	Expansion team
^	Calder Memorial Trophy winner
*	Member of the Hockey Hall of Fame
^{#}	Calder Memorial Trophy winner and member of the Hockey Hall of Fame
^{¤}	No games played in the NHL

Draft	Selected by	Player	Nationality	Position	Amateur/junior/former club	League
1963	Montreal Canadiens	Garry Monahan	Canada	Forward	St. Michael's Buzzers	CJBHL
1964	Detroit Red Wings	Claude Gauthier ^{¤}	Canada	Forward	Comité des jeunes (Rosemont)	QC Midget
1965	New York Rangers	Andre Veilleux ^{¤}	Canada	Forward	Montreal Rangers Jr. B	QC Jr. B
1966	Boston Bruins	Barry Gibbs	Canada	Defenceman	Estevan Bruins	SJHL
1967	Los Angeles Kings^{‡}	Rick Pagnutti ^{¤}	Canada	Defenceman	Garson Native Sons	NOHA
1968	Montreal Canadiens	Michel Plasse	Canada	Goaltender	Drummondville Rangers	QMJHL
1969	Montreal Canadiens	Rejean Houle	Canada	Forward	Montreal Junior Canadiens	OHA
1970	Buffalo Sabres^{‡}	Gilbert Perreault ^{#}	Canada	Forward	Montreal Junior Canadiens	OHA
1971	Montreal Canadiens	Guy Lafleur *	Canada	Forward	Quebec Remparts	QMJHL
1972	New York Islanders^{‡}	Billy Harris	Canada	Forward	Peterborough Petes	OHA
1973	New York Islanders	Denis Potvin ^{#}	Canada	Defenceman	Ottawa 67's	OHA
1974	Washington Capitals	Greg Joly	Canada	Defenceman	Regina Pats	WCHL
1975	Philadelphia Flyers	Mel Bridgman	Canada	Forward	Victoria Cougars	WCHL
1976	Washington Capitals	Rick Green	Canada	Defenceman	London Knights	OHA
1977	Detroit Red Wings	Dale McCourt	Canada	Forward	Hamilton Fincups	OHA
1978	Minnesota North Stars	Bobby Smith ^	Canada	Forward	Ottawa 67's	OHA
1979	Colorado Rockies	Rob Ramage	Canada	Defenceman	London Knights	OHA
1980	Montreal Canadiens	Doug Wickenheiser	Canada	Forward	Regina Pats	WHL
1981	Winnipeg Jets	Dale Hawerchuk ^{#}	Canada	Forward	Cornwall Royals	QMJHL
1982	Boston Bruins	Gord Kluzak	Canada	Defenceman	Billings Bighorns	WHL
1983	Minnesota North Stars	Brian Lawton	United States	Forward	Mount Saint Charles Mounties	USHS-RI
1984	Pittsburgh Penguins	Mario Lemieux ^{#}	Canada	Forward	Laval Voisins	QMJHL
1985	Toronto Maple Leafs	Wendel Clark	Canada	Defenceman^{1}	Saskatoon Blades	WHL
1986	Detroit Red Wings	Joe Murphy	Canada	Forward	Michigan State Spartans	CCHA
1987	Buffalo Sabres	Pierre Turgeon *	Canada	Forward	Granby Bisons	QMJHL
1988	Minnesota North Stars	Mike Modano *	United States	Forward	Prince Albert Raiders	WHL
1989	Quebec Nordiques	Mats Sundin *	Sweden	Forward	Nacka HK	Swe-2
1990	Quebec Nordiques	Owen Nolan	Canada	Forward	Cornwall Royals	OHL
1991	Quebec Nordiques	Eric Lindros *	Canada	Forward	Oshawa Generals	OHL
1992	Tampa Bay Lightning^{‡}	Roman Hamrlik	Czechoslovakia	Defenceman	HC Zlin	CS-1HL
1993	Ottawa Senators	Alexandre Daigle	Canada	Forward	Victoriaville Tigres	QMJHL
1994	Florida Panthers	Ed Jovanovski	Canada	Defenceman	Windsor Spitfires	OHL
1995	Ottawa Senators	Bryan Berard ^	United States	Defenceman	Detroit Junior Red Wings	OHL
1996	Ottawa Senators	Chris Phillips	Canada	Defenceman	Prince Albert Raiders	WHL
1997	Boston Bruins	Joe Thornton *	Canada	Forward	Sault Ste. Marie Greyhounds	OHL
1998	Tampa Bay Lightning	Vincent Lecavalier	Canada	Forward	Rimouski Oceanic	QMJHL
1999	Atlanta Thrashers^{‡}	Patrik Stefan	Czech Republic	Forward	Long Beach Ice Dogs	IHL
2000	New York Islanders	Rick DiPietro	United States	Goaltender	Boston University Terriers	HEA
2001	Atlanta Thrashers	Ilya Kovalchuk	Russia	Forward	Spartak Moscow	RUS-2
2002	Columbus Blue Jackets	Rick Nash	Canada	Forward	London Knights	OHL
2003	Pittsburgh Penguins	Marc-Andre Fleury	Canada	Goaltender	Cape Breton Screaming Eagles	QMJHL
2004	Washington Capitals	Alexander Ovechkin ^	Russia	Forward	Dynamo Moscow	RSL
2005	Pittsburgh Penguins	Sidney Crosby	Canada	Forward	Rimouski Océanic	QMJHL
2006	St. Louis Blues	Erik Johnson	United States	Defenceman	U.S. NTDP	NAHL
2007	Chicago Blackhawks	Patrick Kane ^	United States	Forward	London Knights	OHL
2008	Tampa Bay Lightning	Steven Stamkos	Canada	Forward	Sarnia Sting	OHL
2009	New York Islanders	John Tavares	Canada	Forward	London Knights	OHL
2010	Edmonton Oilers	Taylor Hall	Canada	Forward	Windsor Spitfires	OHL
2011	Edmonton Oilers	Ryan Nugent-Hopkins	Canada	Forward	Red Deer Rebels	WHL
2012	Edmonton Oilers	Nail Yakupov	Russia	Forward	Sarnia Sting	OHL
2013	Colorado Avalanche	Nathan MacKinnon ^	Canada	Forward	Halifax Mooseheads	QMJHL
2014	Florida Panthers	Aaron Ekblad ^	Canada	Defenceman	Barrie Colts	OHL
2015	Edmonton Oilers	Connor McDavid	Canada	Forward	Erie Otters	OHL
2016	Toronto Maple Leafs	Auston Matthews ^	United States	Forward	ZSC Lions	NLA
2017	New Jersey Devils	Nico Hischier	Switzerland	Forward	Halifax Mooseheads	QMJHL
2018	Buffalo Sabres	Rasmus Dahlin	Sweden	Defenceman	Frolunda HC	SHL
2019	New Jersey Devils	Jack Hughes	United States	Forward	U.S. NTDP	USHL
2020	New York Rangers	Alexis Lafreniere	Canada	Forward	Rimouski Océanic	QMJHL
2021	Buffalo Sabres	Owen Power	Canada	Defenceman	Michigan Wolverines	Big Ten
2022	Montreal Canadiens	Juraj Slafkovsky	Slovakia	Forward	TPS	Liiga
2023	Chicago Blackhawks	Connor Bedard ^	Canada	Forward	Regina Pats	WHL
2024	San Jose Sharks	Macklin Celebrini	Canada	Forward	Boston University Terriers	HEA
2025	New York Islanders	Matthew Schaefer ^	Canada	Defenceman	Erie Otters	OHL
2026	Toronto Maple Leafs	Gavin McKenna	Canada	Forward	Penn State Nittany Lions	Big Ten

Notes

1. Wendel Clark was drafted as a defenceman

== First overall picks by team ==
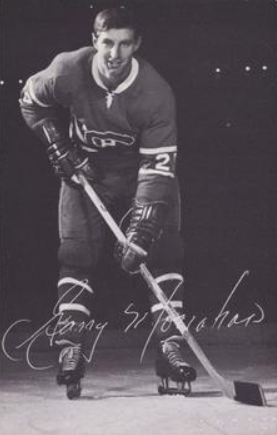
Garry Monahan, selected by the Montreal Canadiens, was the first ever draft pick in the inaugural 1963 draft.

Color key

Has never been awarded a first overall pick
Franchise is defunct

Team	Last #1 overall pick	Total picks awarded/made	Trades/Notes
Montreal Canadiens	2022	4(6)	Acquired pick from Devils (Rockies) in 1980; Acquired pick from the Golden Seals in 1971
New Jersey Devils (formerly Kansas City Scouts/Colorado Rockies)	2019	5(3)	Traded pick to Bruins in 1982 Traded pick to Canadiens in 1980
Florida Panthers	2014	5(2)	Traded pick to Blue Jackets in 2002; Traded pick to Penguins in 2003; Traded pick to Lightning in 1998
Washington Capitals	2004	4(3)	Traded pick to Flyers in 1975
Tampa Bay Lightning	2008	4(3)	Traded pick to Jets (Thrashers) in 1999
Pittsburgh Penguins	2005	3(3)	Acquired pick from Panthers in 2003 Traded pick to Stars (North Stars) in 1983
Boston Bruins	1997	2(3)	Acquired pick from Devils (Rockies) in 1982
Winnipeg Jets (formerly Atlanta Thrashers)	2001	1(2)	Acquired pick from Lightning in 1999
California Golden Seals/Cleveland Barons (defunct)	1971	1(0)	Traded pick to Canadiens in 1971
Columbus Blue Jackets	2002	0(1)	Acquired pick from Panthers in 2002
Philadelphia Flyers	1975	0(1)	Acquired pick from Capitals in 1975
Colorado Avalanche (formerly Quebec Nordiques)	2013	4	
New York Islanders	2025	5	
Edmonton Oilers	2015	4	4 picks were awarded between the years 2010 and 2015; 3 of them awarded in consecutive years (2010, 2011, 2012)
Buffalo Sabres	2021	4	
Detroit Red Wings	1986	3	
Ottawa Senators	1996	3	
Dallas Stars (formerly Minnesota North Stars)	1988	2(3)	Acquired pick from Penguins in 1983
Toronto Maple Leafs	2026	3	
New York Rangers	2020	2	Held first overall pick in the 2020 draft despite taking part in the playoffs, whose format was changed due to the COVID-19 pandemic.
Chicago Blackhawks	2023	2	
St. Louis Blues	2006	1	
Arizona Coyotes (inactive) (formerly Winnipeg Jets)	1981	1	
Los Angeles Kings	1967	1	
San Jose Sharks	2024	1	
Vancouver Canucks	N/A	0	
Anaheim Ducks	N/A	0	
Calgary Flames (formerly Atlanta Flames)	N/A	0	
Vegas Golden Knights	N/A	0	
Carolina Hurricanes	N/A	0	
Seattle Kraken	N/A	0	
Nashville Predators	N/A	0	
Minnesota Wild	N/A	0	
Utah Mammoth	N/A	0	

== See also ==
- WHA Amateur Draft
