= Ed Lee (ice hockey) =

American ice hockey player (born 1961)

- Born: December 17, 1961 (age 64) Bristol, Rhode Island, U.S.
- Height: 6 ft 2 in (188 cm)
- Weight: 180 lb (82 kg; 12 st 12 lb)
- Position: Right wing
- Shot: Right
- Played for: Quebec Nordiques
- National team: United States
- NHL draft: 95th overall, 1981; Quebec Nordiques
- Playing career: 1983–1989

Edward Hubert Lee (born December 17, 1961) is an American former professional ice hockey player who played two games in the National Hockey League with the Quebec Nordiques during the 1984–85 season. Inducted into the Rhode Island Hockey Hall off Fame on August 15, 2026.

== Career ==
Lee played for the Quebec Nordiques and was traded to the Minnesota North Stars in 1985. He also played for the Fredericton Express and Springfield Indians in the American Hockey League.

In 1987, he moved to Germany and joined ESC Ahaus of the Oberliga. The next season (1988–89) the ESC Ahaus was demoted by request to the NRW Liga (two leagues lower). Lee left the club early before the end of this season because of personal reasons and went back to the U.S.

== Career statistics ==
=== Regular season and playoffs ===
			Regular season					Playoffs
Season	Team	League	GP	G	A	Pts	PIM	GP	G	A	Pts	PIM
1978–79	Mount Saint Charles Academy	HS-RI	—	—	—	—	—	—	—	—	—	—
1979–80	Mount Saint Charles Academy	HS-RI	—	—	—	—	—	—	—	—	—	—
1980–81	Princeton University	ECAC	21	6	8	14	34	—	—	—	—	—
1981–82	Princeton University	ECAC	26	12	21	33	46	—	—	—	—	—
1982–83	Princeton University	ECAC	25	14	25	39	51	—	—	—	—	—
1983–84	Princeton University	ECAC	11	10	10	20	22	—	—	—	—	—
1983–84	Fredericton Express	AHL	6	0	4	4	4	—	—	—	—	—
1984–85	Quebec Nordiques	NHL	2	0	0	0	5	—	—	—	—	—
1984–85	Fredericton Express	AHL	21	11	7	18	45	—	—	—	—	—
1985–96	Indianapolis Checkers	IHL	2	0	0	0	)	—	—	—	—	—
1985–86	Fredericton Express	AHL	6	3	1	4	2	—	—	—	—	—
1985–86	Springfield Indians	AHL	24	3	4	7	26	—	—	—	—	—
1987–88	ESC Ahaus	GER-3	32	71	55	126	64	—	—	—	—	—
1988–89	Humberside Seahawks	BD2	1	0	0	0	18	—	—	—	—	—
AHL totals			57	17	16	33	77	—	—	—	—	—
NHL totals			2	—	—	—	5	—	—	—	—	—

=== International ===
Year	Team	Event	GP	G	A	Pts	PIM
1981	United States	WJC	5	2	2	4	8
1983	United States	WC-B	7	2	0	2	0
Junior totals			5	2	2	4	8
Senior totals			7	2	0	2	0
