= Mathieu Schneider =

American ice hockey player (born 1969)

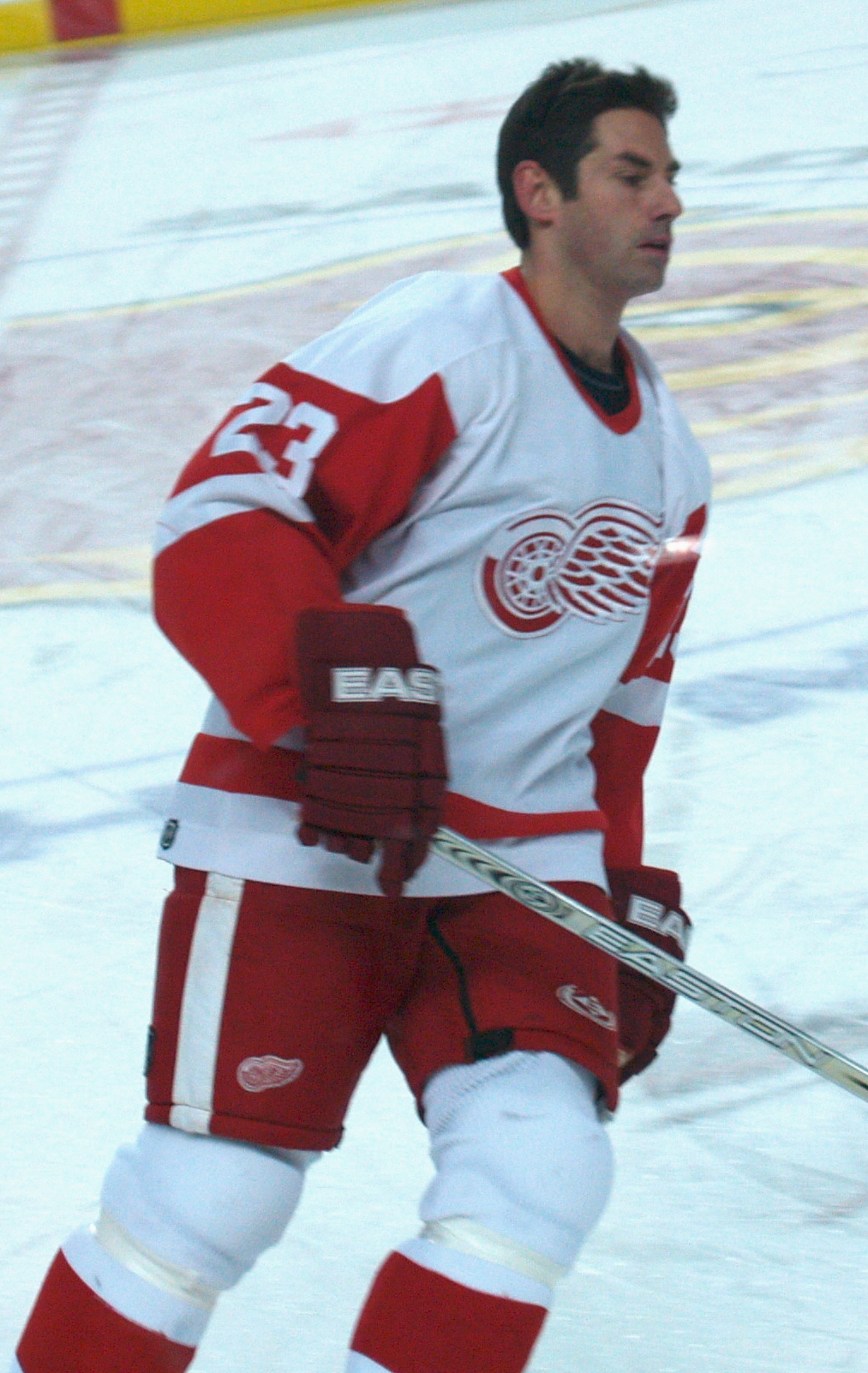
- Schneider with the Detroit Red Wings in 2006
- Born: June 12, 1969 (age 57) New York City, U.S.
- Height: 5 ft 11 in (180 cm)
- Weight: 192 lb (87 kg; 13 st 10 lb)
- Position: Defense
- Shot: Left
- Played for: Montreal Canadiens; New York Islanders; Toronto Maple Leafs; New York Rangers; Los Angeles Kings; Detroit Red Wings; Anaheim Ducks; Atlanta Thrashers; Vancouver Canucks; Phoenix Coyotes
- National team: United States
- NHL draft: 44th overall, 1987; Montreal Canadiens
- Playing career: 1987–2010

Mathieu David Schneider (born June 12, 1969) is an American former professional ice hockey player. Considered an offensive defenseman, Schneider played 1,289 games in the National Hockey League (NHL) with ten different teams, scoring 233 goals and totaling 743 points. He won the Stanley Cup in 1993 with the Montreal Canadiens.

== Early years ==
Schneider, who is Jewish, was born in Manhattan, New York, the first of two sons born to Sam and Aline Schneider. His father is Jewish and his mother, a French-Canadian from Thetford Mines, Quebec, converted to Judaism before marrying his father. He lived with his family in West New York, New Jersey until moving to Woonsocket, Rhode Island, for his high school years. In Woonsocket, Schneider attended high school at Mount Saint Charles Academy. Under the tutelage of coach Normand "Bill" Belisle, Schneider and his team won three of the school's 26 straight Rhode Island state hockey championships. He left Mount Saint Charles after his junior year and joined the Cornwall Royals of the Ontario Hockey League.

== Playing career ==
Drafted in the third round of the 1987 NHL entry draft, 44th overall, by the Montreal Canadiens, Schneider was the Canadiens' fourth pick (after forwards Andrew Cassels and John LeClair, and fellow defenseman Éric Desjardins). He played his first NHL game a few months later when he suited up on 1987–88 opening night against the Philadelphia Flyers. However, after four games, he was sent back to his junior team (Cornwall Royals) for the rest of the season. He would spend the entirety of 1988–89 with Cornwall before splitting the next season between Montreal and their American Hockey League farm team, the Sherbrooke Canadiens. After being promoted to the Canadiens, he scored seven goals and 21 points in 44 games with Montreal. Schneider earned a full-time NHL roster spot in the 1990–91 season and, two years later, he won the 1993 Stanley Cup with the Canadiens, defeating Wayne Gretzky and the Los Angeles Kings in five games. Following his Stanley Cup victory, Schneider broke out with 52 points in 1993–94, topping all team defensemen. During the 1994–95 season, Schneider was traded to the New York Islanders finishing the season with 29 points in 43 games between the two clubs. In 1995–96, he recorded 47 points in 65 games with the Islanders and appeared in his first NHL All-Star Game (1996), before being traded in March 1996 to the Toronto Maple Leafs (along with Toronto fan-favorite Wendel Clark) in exchange for three players and a first-round selection in the 1997 NHL entry draft (eventually Roberto Luongo). He finished the year with 54 points in 78 games between the two clubs.

Prior to the 1996–97 season, Schneider was a member of the 1996 World Cup champion Team USA squad. It was his high point for the season as he suffered a serious groin injury and was lost for the majority of the season, playing only 26 games. He returned to the Leafs from his injury the following season and tallied 37 points in 76 games. He was a contract hold-out as a restricted free agent prior to the 1998–99 season, reportedly seeking a $3.3 million salary with the Maple Leafs. Consequently, a few games into the season, the Maple Leafs traded him to the New York Rangers where he then signed a one-year, $2.75 million contract. Born in Manhattan, Schneider stated his excitement to be playing for his hometown team. In two seasons with the Rangers he accumulated 34, then 30 points.

Schneider was left unprotected in the 2000 NHL Expansion Draft and he was chosen by the Columbus Blue Jackets. However, he was never signed by the Blue Jackets and, less than a month later, Schneider signed with the Los Angeles Kings. In his first season with the Kings, Schneider tallied 51 points in 73 games, his highest total since his 52-point season with the Canadiens in 1993–94. As the Kings played into the second round of the 2001 playoffs, Schneider matched a career-high 9 points in 13 playoff games.

After appearing in his second All-Star Game in 2003, Schneider was dealt at the trade deadline to the Detroit Red Wings for two players and two draft picks. The Kings had shopped Schneider around as he was set to become an unrestricted free agent at the end of the season. With the development of offensive-minded defensemen Joe Corvo and Lubomir Visnovsky, Schneider was considered replaceable by the Kings. Although the Red Wings had traded for Schneider as a rental player to bolster their Stanley Cup run, they were upset in the first round by the Mighty Ducks of Anaheim. Schneider finished the season with 16 goals and 50 points between the Kings and Red Wings.

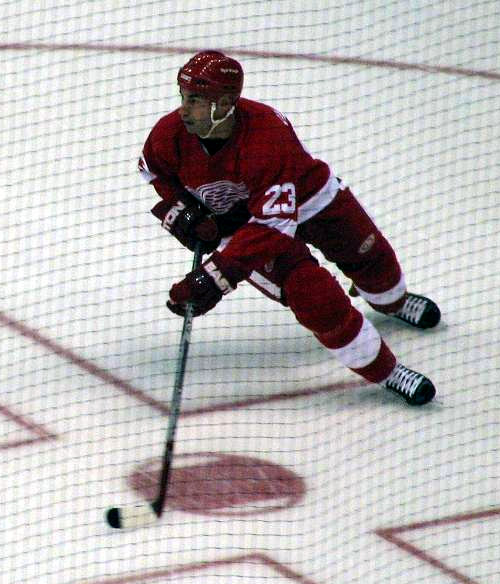
Schneider during a game against Vancouver – October 6, 2006

Schneider was re-signed by Detroit in the off-season to a two-year deal and he eventually played another three seasons with the Red Wings that included a career-high 21 goals and 59 points in 2005–06. He played his 1,000th NHL game against the Anaheim Ducks on October 21 of that same season and scored his 200th NHL goal on March 6, 2007, against the Nashville Predators.

Following the 2006–07 season, Schneider became an unrestricted free agent and he signed a two-year, $11.25 million deal with the Anaheim Ducks. The Ducks had pursued Schneider in lieu of Norris Trophy-winner and team captain Scott Niedermayer's expected retirement (although Niedermayer returned to the Ducks later in the season). By signing with the Ducks, he missed a chance for another Stanley Cup, arriving in Anaheim the same year that Detroit won the 2008 Stanley Cup championship and a year after the Ducks' 2007 Stanley Cup victory. Schneider did not debut with the Ducks until a couple months into the season, as he sustained a broken ankle in a pre-season game against the Los Angeles Kings. In his only season with the Ducks, he tallied 39 points in 65 games, second among Ducks' defensemen.

As the 2008–09 season approached, the Ducks looked to free up cap space in order to re-sign Teemu Selänne. With All-Star defensemen Chris Pronger and Scott Niedermayer ahead of him on the depth chart, Schneider was placed on waivers, but cleared. The Ducks instead traded him to the Atlanta Thrashers on September 26, 2008, in exchange for three players. However, Schneider did not remain with the Thrashers for the whole season. He was traded back to the Montreal Canadiens in February 2009 for two draft choices.

On August 28, 2009, the Vancouver Canucks signed Schneider to a one-year, $1.55 million contract. The deal included a $1 million signing bonus (making his base salary $550,000), dispersed throughout the season over four equal payments. After having undergone off-season shoulder surgery, Schneider missed the first 10 games of the 2009–10 season and made his Canucks debut on October 25 in a 2–0 win against the Edmonton Oilers. He was playing primarily as a depth defenseman and on December 20, he left the team due to a reported dispute about his playing time. Following his debut for the Canucks, he was a healthy scratch 11 times in 28 games. The Canucks explained his absence as a "personal matter", while general manager Mike Gillis reportedly tried to trade Schneider.

On December 29, 2009, Schneider was waived by the Vancouver Canucks. After clearing waivers, he reported to the Canucks' AHL affiliate, the Manitoba Moose on January 2, 2010. On March 3, 2010, Schneider was traded from the Vancouver Canucks to the Phoenix Coyotes for Sean Zimmerman and a sixth-round draft pick. At the end of 2010, Schneider officially ended his career as a player.

Schneider appeared as a member of the Red Wings alumni team on December 31, 2013 at Comerica Park against members of the Toronto Maple Leafs alumni.

== NHLPA career ==
Shortly after announcing his retirement, Schneider became involved with the National Hockey League Players' Association as a special assistant. His first significant project with the NHLPA has been adjustments to the head-shot and boarding rules, alongside former Red Wings teammate Brendan Shanahan. As of 2018, he was a special assistant to now-former NHLPA executive director Don Fehr. In August 2023, Schneider and the NHLPA parted ways after 12 years; he had been the union's second-in-command. In September 2026, he joined the athlete representation agency 3G Sports as an NHLPA-certified agent and director of men's hockey.

== International play ==
Schneider first played for the United States in the 1988 World Junior Championships, tallying 2 assists as the U.S. finished in sixth place. He made his senior international debut at the 1996 World Cup, where the U.S. won the tournament in a three-game final over Canada. Schneider scored 2 goals in 7 games.

Two years later, in 1998, he was selected to join the U.S. team at the 1998 Winter Olympics in Nagano. He failed to register a point as the U.S. finished a disappointing sixth. A serious groin/abdominal injury kept Schneider from consideration for the 2002 Winter Olympics in Salt Lake City, and, although he was chosen to his second World Cup tournament in 2004, he pulled out of the games due to a lack of insurance (he was not signed to an NHL team that summer).

In December 2005, he was selected to represent the U.S. at the 2006 Winter Olympics in Turin. Despite a two-point performance from Schneider in the quarterfinal, the U.S. was eliminated by Finland.

== Personal life ==
Schneider married his wife, Shannon, in 1999, and has 4 children, Mathieu Jr, Abigail, Micah, and Ella. He lives in Manhattan Beach, California. Schneider was one of a handful of Jewish players in the NHL.

== Career statistics ==
=== Regular season and playoffs ===
			Regular season					Playoffs
Season	Team	League	GP	G	A	Pts	PIM	GP	G	A	Pts	PIM
1985–86	Mount Saint Charles Academy	HS-RI	19	3	27	30	—	—	—	—	—	—
1986–87	Cornwall Royals	OHL	63	7	29	36	75	5	0	0	0	22
1987–88	Cornwall Royals	OHL	48	21	40	61	83	11	2	6	8	14
1987–88	Sherbrooke Canadiens	AHL	—	—	—	—	—	3	0	3	3	12
1987–88	Montreal Canadiens	NHL	4	0	0	0	2	—	—	—	—	—
1988–89	Cornwall Royals	OHL	59	16	57	73	96	18	7	20	27	30
1989–90	Sherbrooke Canadiens	AHL	28	6	13	19	20	—	—	—	—	—
1989–90	Montreal Canadiens	NHL	44	7	14	21	25	9	1	3	4	31
1990–91	Montreal Canadiens	NHL	69	10	20	30	63	13	2	7	9	18
1991–92	Montreal Canadiens	NHL	78	8	24	32	72	10	1	4	5	6
1992–93	Montreal Canadiens	NHL	60	13	31	44	91	11	1	2	3	16
1993–94	Montreal Canadiens	NHL	75	20	32	52	62	1	0	0	0	0
1994–95	Montreal Canadiens	NHL	30	5	15	20	49	—	—	—	—	—
1994–95	New York Islanders	NHL	13	3	6	9	30	—	—	—	—	—
1995–96	New York Islanders	NHL	65	11	36	47	93	—	—	—	—	—
1995–96	Toronto Maple Leafs	NHL	13	2	5	7	10	6	0	4	4	8
1996–97	Toronto Maple Leafs	NHL	26	5	7	12	20	—	—	—	—	—
1997–98	Toronto Maple Leafs	NHL	76	11	26	37	44	—	—	—	—	—
1998–99	New York Rangers	NHL	75	10	24	34	71	—	—	—	—	—
1999–00	New York Rangers	NHL	80	10	20	30	78	—	—	—	—	—
2000–01	Los Angeles Kings	NHL	73	16	35	51	56	13	0	9	9	10
2001–02	Los Angeles Kings	NHL	55	7	23	30	68	7	0	1	1	18
2002–03	Los Angeles Kings	NHL	65	14	29	43	57	—	—	—	—	—
2002–03	Detroit Red Wings	NHL	13	2	5	7	16	4	0	0	0	6
2003–04	Detroit Red Wings	NHL	78	14	32	46	56	12	1	2	3	8
2005–06	Detroit Red Wings	NHL	72	21	38	59	86	6	1	7	8	6
2006–07	Detroit Red Wings	NHL	68	11	41	52	66	11	2	4	6	16
2007–08	Anaheim Ducks	NHL	65	12	27	39	50	6	1	0	1	8
2008–09	Atlanta Thrashers	NHL	44	4	11	15	53	—	—	—	—	—
2008–09	Montreal Canadiens	NHL	23	5	12	17	14	2	0	0	0	4
2009–10	Vancouver Canucks	NHL	17	2	3	5	12	—	—	—	—	—
2009–10	Manitoba Moose	AHL	8	3	2	5	8	—	—	—	—	—
2009–10	Phoenix Coyotes	NHL	8	0	4	4	4	3	1	0	1	0
NHL totals			1,289	223	521	744	1,250	116	11	43	54	155

=== International ===
Year	Team	Event	Result	GP	G	A	Pts	PIM
1988	United States	WJC	6th	7	0	2	2	16
1996	United States	WCH	1st place, gold medalist(s)	7	2	0	2	8
1998	United States	OG	6th	4	0	0	0	6
2006	United States	OG	8th	6	1	2	3	16
Junior totals				7	0	2	2	16
Senior totals				17	3	2	5	30

== Awards ==
- Member of one Stanley Cup winning team: 1993 with the Montreal Canadiens
- NHL Playoffs Best Plus/Minus by Defenseman (+10): 1993
- Selected to two NHL All-Star Games: 1996, 2003
- Won the World Cup with Team USA in 1996
- Inducted into the Southern California Jewish Sports Hall of Fame in 2003
- NHL Most Goals by Defenseman (21): 2006
- Inducted into the International Jewish Sports Hall of Fame in 2014
- Inducted into the United States Hockey Hall of Fame in 2015
- Inducted into the Rhode Island Hockey Hall of Fame in 2018
- Inducted into the National Jewish Sports Hall of Fame in 2024

== Transactions ==
- 1987 NHL entry draft – Selected by the Montreal Canadiens in the third round, 44th overall.
- April 5, 1995 – Traded by the Montreal Canadiens, along with Kirk Muller and Craig Darby, to the New York Islanders in exchange for Pierre Turgeon and Vladimir Malakhov.
- March 13, 1996 – Traded by the New York Islanders, along with Wendel Clark and D.J. Smith, to the Toronto Maple Leafs in exchange for Darby Hendrickson, Sean Haggerty, Kenny Jönsson and Toronto's first-round draft choice (Roberto Luongo) in 1997.
- October 14, 1998 – Rights traded by the Toronto Maple Leafs to the New York Rangers in exchange for Alexander Karpovtsev and New York's fourth-round draft choice in 1999; signs one-year, $2.75 million contract with the New York Rangers.
- June 23, 2000 – Claimed by the Columbus Blue Jackets from the New York Rangers in the 2000 NHL Expansion Draft.
- August 14, 2000 – Signed as a free agent with the Los Angeles Kings.
- March 11, 2003 – Traded by the Los Angeles Kings to the Detroit Red Wings in exchange for Sean Avery, Maxim Kuznetsov, Detroit's 2003 first-round draft choice and Detroit's 2004 second-round draft choice.
- July 1, 2007 – Signed as a free agent with the Anaheim Ducks to a two-year, $11.25 million contract.
- September 26, 2008 – Traded by the Anaheim Ducks to the Atlanta Thrashers in exchange for Ken Klee, Brad Larsen and Chad Painchaud.
- February 16, 2009 – Traded by the Atlanta Thrashers to the Montreal Canadiens in exchange for Montreal's second-round draft choice in 2009 and third-round draft choice in 2010.
- August 28, 2009 – Signed as a free agent with the Vancouver Canucks to a one-year, $1.5 million contract.
- March 3, 2010 – Traded to the Phoenix Coyotes for Sean Zimmerman and a conditional sixth-round pick in the 2010 NHL entry draft

== See also ==
- List of NHL players with 1,000 games played
- List of select Jewish ice hockey players
