= Chris Phillips =

Canadian ice hockey player and businessman

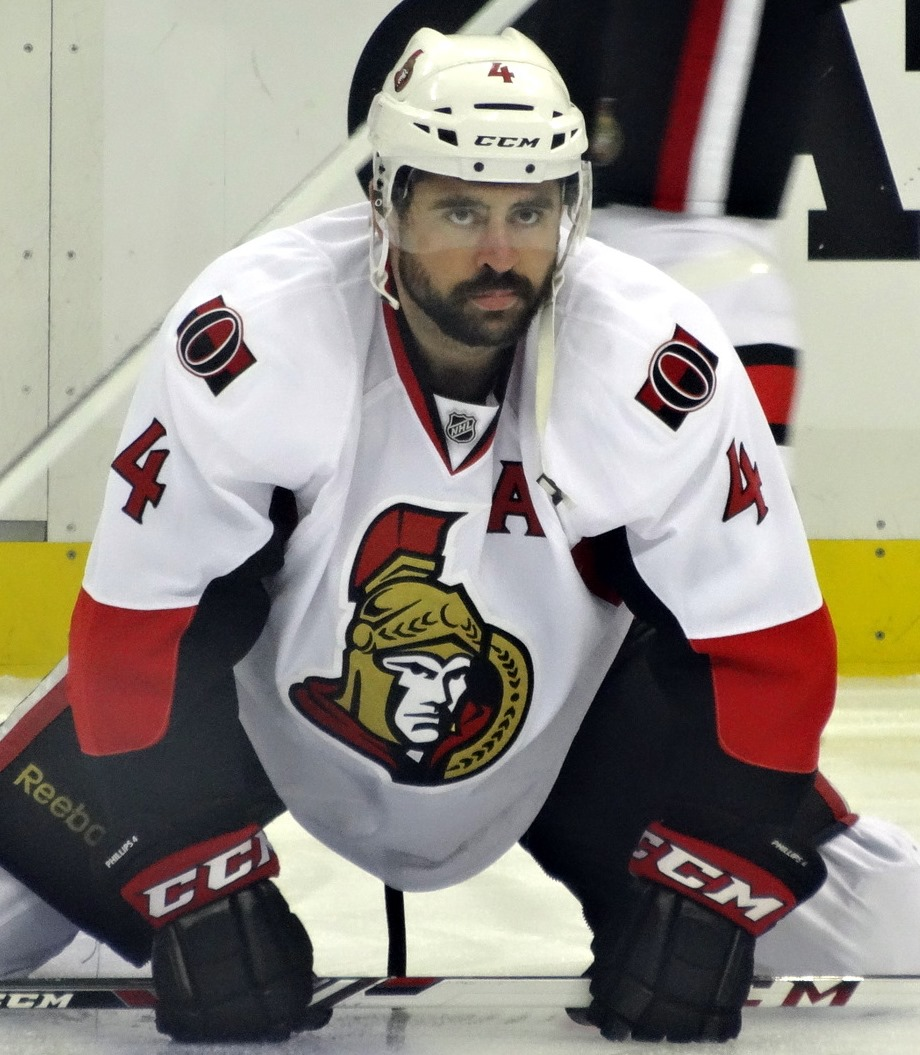
- Phillips with the Ottawa Senators in 2013
- Born: March 9, 1978 (age 48) Calgary, Alberta, Canada
- Height: 6 ft 3 in (191 cm)
- Weight: 215 lb (98 kg; 15 st 5 lb)
- Position: Defence
- Shot: Left
- Played for: Ottawa Senators; Brynäs IF
- National team: Canada
- NHL draft: 1st overall, 1996; Ottawa Senators
- Playing career: 1997–2015
Medal record
Representing Canada
Ice hockey
World Championships
Silver medal – second place	2009 Switzerland
Silver medal – second place	2005 Austria
World Junior Championships
Gold medal – first place	1997 Switzerland
Gold medal – first place	1996 USA

Chris Phillips (born March 9, 1978) is a Canadian businessman and former professional ice hockey player. Phillips was a member of the Ottawa Senators for his entire NHL career, which began with the 1997–98 season and ended with the 2015–16 season. He was regarded as a stay-at-home defenceman. The Senators drafted him first overall in the 1996 NHL entry draft. Phillips retired in 2016 after spending a season on the injured list. Phillips played 1,179 games with Ottawa in the regular season, making him the longest-serving player in Senators franchise history. In addition, he played in 114 playoff games. His number was retired by the team in 2019.

Phillips worked in community and business development for the Senators from 2015 to 2021, when he resigned as the executive director of the Senators Community Foundation after a dispute with owner Eugene Melnyk. After Melnyk's death, he rejoined the organization in September 2022 as the Vice President of Community and Business Development.

== Playing career ==
=== Fort McMurray Oil Barons ===
Phillips was raised in Fort McMurray, Alberta. He began his junior career with the Junior A Fort McMurray Oil Barons of the Alberta Junior Hockey League in 1993–94, where he had six goals and 22 points in 56 games. In 10 playoff games, Phillips had three assists. He returned to the Oil Barons for the 1994–95 season, in which he saw his offensive production increase to 16 goals and 48 points in 48 games. In 11 post-season games, Phillips had four goals and six points. Phillips also participated in the 1995 Canada Winter Games where he was the captain of the Alberta team.

=== Prince Albert Raiders ===
Phillips joined the Major Junior Prince Albert Raiders of the WHL for the 1995-96 season, where he registered 10 goals and 30 assists in 61 games as a rookie with the Raiders. Phillips helped the Raiders to the Conference Finals, with 2 goals and 12 assists in 18 games. After the season, Phillips won the Jim Piggott Memorial Trophy and was drafted first overall in the 1996 NHL entry draft by the Ottawa Senators.

The Senators reassigned Phillips to the Raiders for the 1996-97. In 32 games back with the Raiders, he tallied three goals and 26 points. Prince Albert traded Phillips to the Lethbridge Hurricanes midway through the season.

=== Lethbridge Hurricanes ===
Phillips finished the 1996–97 season with the Lethbridge Hurricanes, where he had four goals and 22 points in 26 games, helping the club finish in first place in the Central Division.

In the playoffs, Phillips finished second in team scoring with 25 points, with four goals and 21 assists, to help Lethbridge win the President's Cup, and earn a berth at the 1997 Memorial Cup held in Hull, Quebec.

In the Memorial Cup, Phillips had two goals and five points in five games, as the Hurricanes finished the tournament in second place, losing to the Hull Olympiques in the final.

Phillips was selected to the Memorial Cup all-star team, and won the 1996-97 Bill Hunter Memorial Trophy, which is awarded to the top defenseman in the WHL.

=== Ottawa Senators ===
Phillips made his NHL debut in the 1997–98 season, when he appeared in 72 games with the Ottawa Senators, scoring five goals and 16 points, helping the club finish above .500 for the first time in team history. In 11 playoff games, Phillips had two assists, as Ottawa upset the New Jersey Devils in the first round, before falling to the Washington Capitals in the second round of the 1998 Stanley Cup Playoffs.

Phillips missed 48 games in the 1998-99, as he scored three goals and six points in 34 games with the Senators, before going pointless in three playoff games.

He saw his point total increase during the 1999–2000 season, as Phillips had five goals and 19 points in 65 games. In six playoff games, Phillips had an assist.

Phillips had another solid season with the club in 2000–01, appearing in 73 games, scoring two goals and 14 points, however, he suffered a late-season injury, in which he appeared in only one playoff game with the Senators. In that game, he scored his first ever playoff goal against Curtis Joseph of the Toronto Maple Leafs.

He remained a big part of the Senators blueline in 2001–02, as Phillips scored six goals and 22 points in 63 games. In 12 playoff games, Phillips did not register a point.

In 2002–03, Phillips helped the Senators win the Presidents' Trophy, which is awarded to the team with the best regular season record in the NHL. In 78 games, Phillips had three goals and 19 points. In the post-season, Phillips had a memorable goal for the Senators, as in game six of the Eastern Conference finals against the New Jersey Devils, Phillips scored the overtime winner, as Ottawa fought off elimination. The Senators lost the seventh game, but Phillips had a very successful playoff run, scoring two goals and six points in 18 games.

Phillips appeared in all 82 games for the first time of his career in 2003–04, as he scored seven goals and 23 points for the Senators. In the playoffs, Phillips once again had some overtime magic, as he scored the winning goal in the fourth game of the Senators first round series against the Toronto Maple Leafs. Toronto ended up winning the series in seven games, and that goal was Phillips only point of the series.

During the 2004–05 NHL lockout, Phillips signed with Brynäs IF of the SEL, where he had five goals and eight points in 27 games. In nine playoff games, Phillips had a goal and three points.

In 2005–06, he returned to the Senators, where Phillips had a goal and 19 points in 68 games. On December 26, 2005, Phillips played in his 500th career game. In nine playoff games, Phillips had two goals.

Phillips had his best offensive season of his career in 2006-07, as he had eight goals and 26 points as he played in all 82 games. Phillips had a +36 rating, which ranked him among the top of the NHL leaderboard. Prior to the season, the Senators named Phillips as an alternate captain. In the playoffs, Phillips played over 23 minutes a game, shutting down the top offensive players of the Senators opponents, as he helped the team reach the 2007 Stanley Cup Finals, where the Senators lost in five games to the Anaheim Ducks. In 20 playoff games, Phillips had no points, and in the deciding Game 5 of the Finals, Phillips ended up scoring what turned out to be the cup-winning goal for Anaheim into his own net.

In 2007-08, Phillips had five goals and 18 points in 81 games, however, the Senators playoff run was short, as they were swept in the first round against the Pittsburgh Penguins, as Phillips was held pointless in four games.

The 2008–09 season saw the Senators struggle, as the team failed to make the playoffs for the first time since 1996. Phillips had another solid season, scoring six goals and 22 points in 82 games, however, he had a -14 rating, making it the first time since the 1998-99 season that Phillips was a minus player.

In 2009–10, the Senators returned to the playoffs, and Phillips played a key role, as he tied his career high of eight goals and had 24 points, the second highest point total of his career, and he played in all 82 games for the second season in a row. In six playoff games, Phillips had no points.

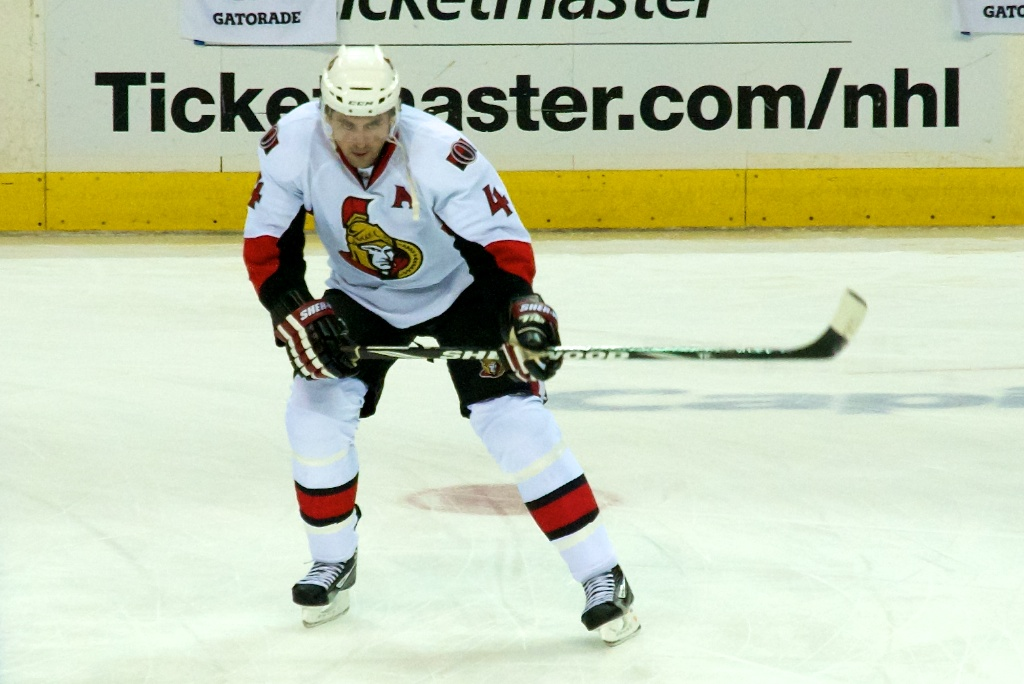
Phillips with the Senators, January 2011

Phillips had a poor 2010–11 season, as he scored only a goal and nine points, his lowest point total since 1998–99, and had a -35 rating, as Ottawa struggled and failed to qualify for the playoffs for the second time in three seasons.

Phillips went on to have a much better season in 2011–12 with the Senators. He finished the season with 5 goals and 19 points with a plus-minus of +12 during 80 games played. His elevated play helped the Senator's back into the Stanley Cup playoffs, though they lost in 7 games to the New York Rangers in the Eastern Conference quarter finals.

During the 2012–13 NHL lockout, Phillips acted as the Senators' NHLPA team representative and was close to the negotiations. He was critical of how the NHL presented their definition of hockey related revenue (HRR), a major issue in the ongoing labour dispute. "Basically, they changed the definition, where there would be no accountability in terms of HRR accounting, so they could basically give us whatever number they wanted to", Phillips was quoted as saying. Other players such as Josh Gorges and Brian Gionta shared Phillips' view. Phillips accused the NHL of "dirty tricks" which were hindering negotiations.

On March 5, 2014, Phillips signed a two-year contract extension worth $2.5 million with the Ottawa Senators.

On February 5, 2015, Phillips played in his 1,179th career game as a member of the Ottawa Senators. This marked a new franchise record, previously held by former team captain Daniel Alfredsson, for most games played for the club.

In the summer of 2015, while attempting to return to hockey, Phillips suffered a crack in a disc in his back, rendering him unable to participate in the Ottawa Senators training camp. He subsequently missed the entire 2015–16 season, and announced his retirement on May 26, 2016. His 1293 regular season and playoff games with the club makes him the longest serving player in franchise history. On October 5, 2019, the Senators announced that Phillips would have his jersey number (#4) retired by the team on February 18 of the upcoming season. He is the second player to have their jersey retired by the franchise, the other being Daniel Alfredsson.

== International play ==
Phillips played for Team Canada at the 1996 World Junior Ice Hockey Championships held in Boston, Massachusetts, where he was held pointless in six games, as Canada won the gold medal. He returned to the tournament in 1997, held in Geneva, Switzerland, where Phillips had an assist in seven games, helping Canada win the gold medal once again. He was named to the 1997 tournament all-star team.

Phillips played for the Canadians at the 2000 IIHF World Championship held in St. Petersburg, Russia, where he had no points in nine games, as Canada finished in fourth place. He returned for the Canadian team at the 2005 IIHF World Championship held in Vienna and Innsbruck, Austria, where the Canadians finished with a silver medal. In nine games, Phillips had an assist. Phillips represented Canada again at the 2009 IIHF World Championship held in Bern and Kloten, Switzerland, recording three assists in nine games as Canada won the silver medal. On November 11 playing with the Stitts Vegas selects on an overseas trip to Sweden, Phillips recorded 1 goal and 3 assists in his first international play in almost a decade.

== Other ventures and post-retirement career ==
In 2012, Phillips became a co-owner of Big Rig, a microbrewery business named after his on-ice nickname. In 2014, it opened a second location and a new production facility. Its Big Rig Black IPA won the a gold medal at the 2014 Ontario Brewing Awards as well as the gold medal at the 2014 Canadian Brewing Awards. In 2019, the Big Rig business was purchased by Foodtastic, a Quebec restaurant chain, and Phillips sold his share by the end of the year.

After his retirement in May 2016, Ottawa Senators general manager Pierre Dorion said that Phillips would have a role in the team organization working on community development, businesses development, and relations with alumni. Phillips served as a director of community and business development for five years, before being appointed the first executive director of the Senators Community Foundation in August 2020. The Senators Community Foundation was established to replace the role of the Ottawa Senators Foundation, which had ended its longstanding relationship with the team in July 2020. In July 2021, Phillips resigned as executive director of the Senators Community Foundation after a disagreement with owner Eugene Melnyk. In September 2022, after Melnyk's death, Phillips rejoined the organization as its Vice President of Business Operations, a role in which he would have to repair strained relationships with Ottawa businesses from the Melnyk era.

Phillips has also served as an assistant coach for the Kanata Lasers when his son was on the team.

== Personal life ==
Phillips and his wife Erin live in Ottawa and have three children. He is the nephew of retired Edmonton Oilers radio broadcaster Rod Phillips.

In September 2012, it was revealed that Phillips was initiating a $7.5-million lawsuit against his former agent, Stacey McAlpine, to recover lost money as a result of bad real estate deals. The suit, launched at the Ontario court in Ottawa, alleges that Phillips was misled by McAlpine and hasn't been able to recover monies invested or access more than $5.5 million of his money being handled by McAlpine. The suit came one month after Phillips' former Ottawa teammate Dany Heatley initiated similar legal proceedings against McAlpine.

== Career statistics ==
=== Regular season and playoffs ===
			Regular season					Playoffs
Season	Team	League	GP	G	A	Pts	PIM	GP	G	A	Pts	PIM
1993–94	Fort McMurray Oil Barons	AJHL	56	6	12	22	72	10	0	3	3	16
1994–95	Fort McMurray Oil Barons	AJHL	48	16	32	48	127	11	4	2	6	10
1995–96	Prince Albert Raiders	WHL	61	10	30	40	97	18	2	12	14	30
1996–97	Prince Albert Raiders	WHL	32	3	23	26	58	—	—	—	—	—
1996–97	Lethbridge Hurricanes	WHL	26	4	18	22	28	19	4	21	25	20
1997–98	Ottawa Senators	NHL	72	5	11	16	38	11	0	2	2	2
1998–99	Ottawa Senators	NHL	34	3	3	6	32	3	0	0	0	0
1999–00	Ottawa Senators	NHL	65	5	14	19	41	6	0	1	1	4
2000–01	Ottawa Senators	NHL	73	2	12	14	49	1	1	0	0	0
2001–02	Ottawa Senators	NHL	63	6	16	22	29	12	0	0	0	12
2002–03	Ottawa Senators	NHL	78	3	16	19	71	18	2	4	6	12
2003–04	Ottawa Senators	NHL	82	7	16	23	46	7	1	0	1	12
2004–05	Brynäs IF	SEL	27	5	3	8	45	—	—	—	—	—
2005–06	Ottawa Senators	NHL	69	1	18	19	90	9	2	0	2	6
2006–07	Ottawa Senators	NHL	82	8	18	26	80	20	0	0	0	24
2007–08	Ottawa Senators	NHL	81	5	13	18	56	4	0	0	0	4
2008–09	Ottawa Senators	NHL	82	6	16	22	66	—	—	—	—	—
2009–10	Ottawa Senators	NHL	82	8	16	24	45	6	0	0	0	4
2010–11	Ottawa Senators	NHL	82	1	8	9	32	—	—	—	—	—
2011–12	Ottawa Senators	NHL	80	5	14	19	16	7	0	1	1	4
2012–13	Ottawa Senators	NHL	48	5	9	14	43	10	0	1	1	21
2013–14	Ottawa Senators	NHL	70	1	14	15	30	—	—	—	—	—
2014–15	Ottawa Senators	NHL	36	0	3	3	14	—	—	—	—	—
NHL totals			1,179	71	217	288	758	114	6	9	15	105

=== International ===
Year	Team	Event	Result	GP	G	A	Pts	PIM
1996	Canada	WJC	1st place, gold medalist(s)	6	0	0	0	0
1997	Canada	WJC	1st place, gold medalist(s)	7	0	1	1	4
2000	Canada	WC	4th	9	0	0	0	2
2005	Canada	WC	2nd place, silver medalist(s)	9	0	1	1	8
2009	Canada	WC	2nd place, silver medalist(s)	9	0	3	3	12
Junior totals				13	0	1	1	4
Senior totals				27	0	4	4	22

== Awards ==
Canadian Hockey League

- Top Draft Prospect - 1996

Western Hockey League

- Jim Piggott Memorial Trophy (Rookie of the Year) - 1996
- Bill Hunter Memorial Trophy (Top Defenceman) - 1997
- East First All-Star Team - 1997

== See also ==
- List of NHL players with 1,000 games played
- List of NHL players who spent their entire career with one franchise

Awards and achievements
Preceded by Bryan Berard	NHL first overall draft pick 1996	Succeeded by Joe Thornton
Preceded by Bryan Berard	Ottawa Senators first-round draft pick 1996	Succeeded by Marián Hossa
