= Brian Lawton =

American ice hockey player (born 1965)

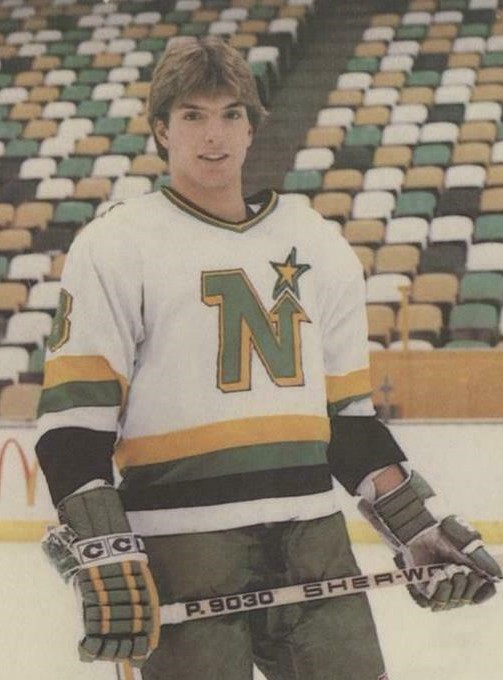
- Lawton with the Minnesota North Stars in 1985
- Born: June 29, 1965 (age 61) New Brunswick, New Jersey, U.S.
- Height: 6 ft 0 in (183 cm)
- Weight: 180 lb (82 kg; 12 st 12 lb)
- Position: Centre
- Shot: Left
- Played for: Minnesota North Stars; New York Rangers; Hartford Whalers; Quebec Nordiques; Boston Bruins; San Jose Sharks
- National team: United States
- NHL draft: 1st overall, 1983; Minnesota North Stars
- Playing career: 1983–1993

Brian Robert Lawton (born June 29, 1965) is an American former professional ice hockey player, agent and general manager, who played 483 regular season games in the National Hockey League (NHL) between the 1983–84 and 1992–93 seasons. Drafted first overall by the Minnesota North Stars in the 1983 NHL entry draft, Lawton played for the North Stars, New York Rangers, Hartford Whalers, Quebec Nordiques, Boston Bruins and San Jose Sharks, and was the Tampa Bay Lightning general manager. He was born in New Brunswick, New Jersey and raised in Cumberland, Rhode Island.

== Playing career ==
After playing for the U.S. Junior Hockey Team at the World Junior Ice Hockey Championships in 1983, and leading his high school, Mount Saint Charles Academy in Woonsocket, Rhode Island, to consecutive championships, Lawton was the first overall draft pick by the North Stars in the 1983 NHL entry draft. Lawton is noted for being both the first US-born and first non-Canadian hockey player drafted first overall in the NHL draft. He was also the first and, as of 2024, the only US high school hockey player to be drafted first overall.

Lawton was ranked by the NHL Central Scouting Bureau as the top prospect for the 1983 Entry Draft. His NHL career included 266 career points in 483 games. Lawton played his first couple of years in Minnesota, and split his second season between the North Stars and their American Hockey League affiliate, the Springfield Indians. In 1983, Lawton was training with the U.S. National Hockey Team, but unlike other North Stars prospects, Lawton was encouraged to turn professional ahead of the 1984 Winter Olympics, and though he did later play in the 1984 Canada Cup, missed the extra experience playing in Sarajevo would have afforded him. Lawton also later played for the United States team at the 1987 Championships.

Prior to Jesse Puljujärvi, Mikhail Sergachev and Connor Bedard, Lawton was the only NHL player to ever wear the number 98, which he chose during his rookie season but changed to number 8 after two seasons owing to unwelcome comparisons to Wayne Gretzky's number 99. Lawton set a mark for the North Stars franchise for fastest two goals scored by a rookie, at 19 seconds, in 1983. After five seasons with Minnesota, Lawton had not scored more than 44 points in any season, and the North Stars apparently washed their hands of him, attempting to assign him to their affiliate in Kalamazoo, Michigan. When Lawton refused to report, the North Stars traded him to the New York Rangers in October 1988. Halfway through the 1988–89 NHL season, the Rangers traded him again, to Hartford, and Lawton would go on to play in eight different cities over the next four years. Lawton would later say that being moved around as often as he was, was a factor in his performance over the years, and an aspect of the game that he never enjoyed.

== Post-playing career ==
Lawton retired as a player in 1993, after being traded to the New Jersey Devils by San Jose, yet never playing for the Devils. He started his company, Lawton Sport and Financial, right away, and at the time of the company's purchase by Octagon Athlete Representation in 1998, represented 12 players in the NHL. At times representing players such as Mike Modano, Sergei Fedorov and Ryan Malone, Lawton became Octagon's managing director for hockey, helping Octagon expand their hockey client base and becoming the second-largest hockey agency in the NHL.

Lawton left Octagon in 2008 in order to pursue management opportunities in the NHL, having known since his playing days that he ultimately wanted to be in management. After interviewing for management positions with a number of teams, caught the attention of then-new Tampa Bay Lightning owners Len Barrie and Oren Koules, by approaching them with a prepared 46-page proposal for how to improve the then-last place team. On June 25, 2008, Lawton was named Vice President of Hockey Operations for the Lightning, and while Jay Feaster remained in the position of general manager until resigning in July, it was Lawton, along with Koules and Barrie, who were making the decisions. Feaster himself indicated in his official announcement that Lawton had already been running the team with Koules and Barrie. Lawton was officially named as general manager and executive vice president on October 2, 2008. Among the earliest moves Lawton made with the Tampa organization were hiring Tom Kurvers and Greg Malone to front office positions, and acquiring and signing Gary Roberts and Ryan Malone, the latter of whom is the son of Greg Malone, and was also a client of Lawton's when he was an agent.

Lawton was dismissed as general manager on April 12, 2010, and replaced, on an interim basis, by Tom Kurvers, a Lawton hire. Ultimately, Steve Yzerman, a former client of Lawton's and drafted three picks behind him, was named as the new general manager.

In 2018, Lawton was inducted into the Rhode Island Hockey Hall of Fame. He is formerly an on-air analyst for the NHL Network.

He married Angelina Lawton, formerly Angelina Rahn in 1992. They currently reside in Minneapolis, Minnesota and have three children. Angelina is the CEO of sports/tech agency, Sportsdigita.

== Career statistics ==
=== Regular season and playoffs ===
			Regular season					Playoffs
Season	Team	League	GP	G	A	Pts	PIM	GP	G	A	Pts	PIM
1981–82	Mount Saint Charles Academy	HS-RI	26	45	43	88	—	—	—	—	—	—
1982–83	Mount Saint Charles Academy	HS-RI	23	40	43	83	—	—	—	—	—	—
1982–83	United States	Intl	7	3	2	5	6	—	—	—	—	—
1983–84	Minnesota North Stars	NHL	58	10	21	31	33	5	0	0	0	10
1984–85	Minnesota North Stars	NHL	40	5	6	11	24	—	—	—	—	—
1984–85	Springfield Indians	AHL	42	14	28	42	37	4	1	1	2	2
1985–86	Minnesota North Stars	NHL	65	18	17	35	36	3	0	1	1	2
1986–87	Minnesota North Stars	NHL	66	21	23	44	86	—	—	—	—	—
1987–88	Minnesota North Stars	NHL	74	17	24	41	71	—	—	—	—	—
1988–89	New York Rangers	NHL	30	7	10	17	39	—	—	—	—	—
1988–89	Hartford Whalers	NHL	35	10	16	26	28	3	1	0	1	0
1989–90	Hartford Whalers	NHL	13	2	1	3	6	—	—	—	—	—
1989–90	Quebec Nordiques	NHL	14	5	6	11	10	—	—	—	—	—
1989–90	Maine Mariners	AHL	5	0	0	0	14	—	—	—	—	—
1989–90	Boston Bruins	NHL	8	0	0	0	14	—	—	—	—	—
1990–91	Phoenix Roadrunners	IHL	63	26	40	66	108	11	4	9	13	40
1991–92	San Jose Sharks	NHL	59	15	22	37	42	—	—	—	—	—
1992–93	Kansas City Blades	IHL	9	6	4	10	10	—	—	—	—	—
1992–93	San Jose Sharks	NHL	21	2	8	10	12	—	—	—	—	—
1992–93	Cincinnati Cyclones	IHL	17	5	11	16	30	—	—	—	—	—
NHL totals			483	112	154	266	401	11	1	1	2	12

=== International ===
Year	Team	Event	GP	G	A	Pts	PIM
1983	United States	WJC	7	3	1	4	6
1984	United States	CC	6	5	0	5	4
1987	United States	WC	8	3	3	6	14
Junior totals			7	3	1	4	6
Senior totals			14	8	3	11	18

Preceded by Gord Kluzak	NHL first overall draft pick 1983	Succeeded by Mario Lemieux
Preceded by Brian Bellows	Minnesota North Stars first-round draft pick 1983	Succeeded by David Quinn
Preceded by Jay Feaster	General Manager of the Tampa Bay Lightning; 2008–10	Succeeded by Tom Kurvers
