= Jay Pattee =

American football and basketball coach (1921–1967)

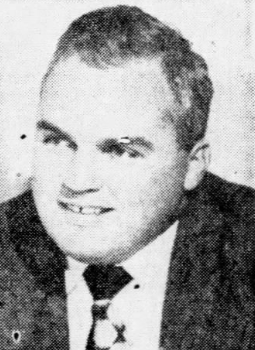
- Pattee in 1952

Biographical details
- Born: May 6, 1921; Massachusetts, U.S.
- Died: February 2, 1967 (aged 45); Ceres, California, U.S.

Playing career

Football
- 1940–1943: Brown

Basketball
- c. 1940–1941: Brown

Baseball
- c. 1940s: Brown
- Positions: Quarterback, placekicker (football); Guard (basketball)

Coaching career (HC unless noted)

Football
- 1947: Torrington HS (CT)
- 1948–1949: Toledo (backfield)
- 1950–1951: Stetson (backfield)
- 1952–1953: Stetson
- 1954–1956: Idaho (backfield)
- 1957–1966: Modesto HS (CA)

Basketball
- 1947–1948: Torrington HS (CT)
- 1951–1952: Stetson

Head coaching record
- Overall: 6–10–3 (college football); 16–4 (college basketball)

John Hiram "Jay" Pattee (May 6, 1921 – February 2, 1967) was an American college football and basketball coach. He was the head football coach for John B. Stetson University (now known as Stetson University) from 1952 to 1953 and head basketball coach from 1951 to 1952.

== Playing career ==
Pattee was born on May 6, 1921, in Massachusetts, to Harry Pattee, a former professional baseball player, and Margaret Grant. Pattee was almost named Olaf Gustaf Hazard Oden Pattee after his father, who was coaching the Brown baseball team at the time, said he would name his son after whoever hit the first home run in the team's game against Columbia. The first player to hit a home run was Curly Oden, who, after reciting the entirety of his Swedish name, left Harry astonished. Instead of being the namesake, Oden was honored as Jay Pattee's godfather. Pattee's brother, Harry Pattee Jr., was the starting quarterback on the 1937 state champion Barrington High School football team.

Pattee grew up in Barrington, Rhode Island and was a quarterback and placekicker for Barrington High School. During his high school career, he missed only one extra point, with his only missing being a game losing miss in the Class C State Championship. Alongside football, Pattee also participated in basketball, baseball, and track and field for the school. After graduating, he took a graduate year with Kents Hill School in Kents Hill, Maine, where he starred in football and basketball. He was voted as Rhode Island's outstanding athlete in 1939.

Pattee then enrolled at his father's alma mater, Brown University, as a football, basketball, and baseball player.

As a freshman, Pattee followed in his father's footsteps as they both were named captains of the freshmen football team during their tenures with the team. After missing his first two extra points, he went on to make nine consecutive kicks. During his sophomore year, the 190-pound blocking back served as the backup to captain Ernie Savignano and made his varsity debut in Brown's 20–6 opening win over Wesleyan. On the year, he also completed all three of his point-after attempts. He maintained his dominance as a placekicker in his junior year, finishing with 16 out of 18 kicks being good. In 1943, his senior year, he finished making all 18 of kicks and finished his career with a Brown-record of 46 of 50 throughout his entire career. At the conclusion of his college football career, he earned honorable mention All-American honors.

With the basketball team, Pattee was described as an "outstanding" player for the freshmen basketball team.

== Coaching career ==
In 1947, Pattee began his coaching career as the head football and basketball coach for Torrington High School. Alongside coaching at Torrington, he also was an instructed at the YMCA in Torrington, Connecticut. In 1948, he rejoined his old head coach Skip Stahley as the backfield coach for Toledo. In 1950, Pattee joined fellow former Brown teammate Joe McMullen after he was hired as the head coach for Stetson. In 1951, alongside assisting the football team, Pattee was picked as the head basketball coach. He resigned after one season as basketball coach to work as an insurance agent.

In 1952, after a highly successful 16–3–2 record in two years under McMullen, McMullen resigned to become the head coach for Washington & Jefferson, leaving Stetson to promote Pattee to the head coaching position. His first move as head coach was to hire assistant Gene Stauber to coach the line as Pattee opted to remain working directly with the backfield himself. With Stetson, he aimed to return to the one-platoon system, with seven players playing both ways in his inaugural 1952 season. He stated that the one-platoon system would "personalize the game...the spectators will see men block and tackle, not block or tackle. They'll know their players better." It also allowed for the team to have a smaller roster, letting Pettee pick from a pool of 48 players rather than 100 or more like other schools. He resigned after two seasons and an overall record of 6–10–3. He recommended his assistant Joe Berry for the position, but renowned coach Herb McQuillan ultimately returned for the position.

Following Pettee's resignation from Stetson, he rejoined Stahley again, this time as the backfield coach for Idaho. He resigned from Idaho after three seasons and retired from coaching altogether.

Pattee was out of coaching briefly as he pursued other business ventures before being hired as the head football coach for Modesto High School. He replaced Don Warhurst who was hired as the head coach for Cal Poly Pomona. As head coach, he aimed to bring Stahley's offense with him and run the spread offense. Pattee coached at Modesto until his death in 1967. He had led the team to a 9–1, 7–0 in conference, and a conference championship. The team repeated its success in 1966 before tying Turlock High School in the last game of the season.

== Personal life ==
Pattee's father, Harry Pattee, played professional baseball for the Brooklyn Superbas. Pattee served in the United States Navy in 1944 after receiving his bachelor of arts from Brown. He served as an assistant gunnery officer on the USS Strong (DD-758) before working as a transportation officer at the Boston Navy Yard in Charlestown, Boston. He was discharged in 1946.

In 1950, Pattee married Tommy, a woman he had met on a blind date.

In 1957, Pattee left coaching to pursue a business venture in turf and lawn for a new chemical solution for soil. He picked up the business idea from the father of a football player in the Idaho team. The father, Wade Patterson Sr., backed the product that initially was developed by a man in California.

Pattee died on February 2, 1967, at 45 years old. Prior to his death he was playing handball at the Sportsmen at the Stanislaus clubhouse in Modesto, California. He had collapsed after being hit in the head with the ball and never regained consciousness, he was pronounced dead at 4:30 p.m. at a nearby hospital in Ceres, California. His cause of death was officially ruled as a stroke. He was survived by his wife and 15-year old daughter, who attended Modesto High School.

== Head coaching record ==
=== College football ===
Year	Team	Overall	Conference	Standing	Bowl/playoffs
Stetson Hatters (Independent) (1952–1953)
1952	Stetson	3–4–3			
1953	Stetson	3–6			
Stetson:		6–10–3			
Total:		6–10–3			

=== College basketball ===
Record table
Season	Team	Overall	Conference	Standing	Postseason
Stetson Hatters (Independent) (1951–1952)
1951–52	Stetson	16–4			
Stetson:		16–4			
Total:		16–4			
