= Bryan Berard =

American ice hockey player (born 1977)

- Born: March 5, 1977 (age 49) Woonsocket, Rhode Island, U.S.
- Height: 6 ft 2 in (188 cm)
- Weight: 220 lb (100 kg; 15 st 10 lb)
- Position: Defense
- Shot: Left
- Played for: New York Islanders; Toronto Maple Leafs; New York Rangers; Boston Bruins; Chicago Blackhawks; Columbus Blue Jackets; Vityaz Chekhov
- National team: United States
- NHL draft: 1st overall, 1995; Ottawa Senators
- Playing career: 1996–2009

Bryan Wallace Berard (born March 5, 1977) is an American former professional ice hockey defenseman. Berard was the first overall pick in the 1995 NHL entry draft by the Ottawa Senators. He is most noted for a debilitating eye injury he received early in his career. Berard underwent several operations, and played 619 games in his NHL career despite the seriousness of the injury.

== Playing career ==
=== Junior career ===
Berard was born in Woonsocket, Rhode Island. He began his junior career playing for Mount St. Charles Academy in Rhode Island. He won three championships with the school before departing after his third year. Berard had offers from Boston College, the University of Maine, and the University of Michigan, but chose to go the Ontario Hockey League (OHL). Berard was drafted by the Detroit Junior Red Wings of the OHL and won the OHL Championship with the team in the 1994–95 season. He also made the league's first all-star team. He was also named the league's rookie of the year, only the third defenceman to win the trophy.

=== Entry draft and New York Islanders ===
Berard entered the 1995 NHL entry draft as the consensus number one pick according to several pundits, and was subsequently drafted first overall by the Ottawa Senators. The Hartford Whalers, who entered the draft holding the 13th overall pick, contacted the Senators in an effort to trade for the first overall pick to select Berard, but halted their efforts when Ottawa's asking price of Chris Pronger was deemed too high.

As the first overall pick, and with the Senators blue line among the weaker in the league, Berard anticipated going straight to the National Hockey League. However, after his first training camp with the team, he was returned to junior hockey. Concerned about his development, Berard requested a trade. In January 1996, the Senators traded Berard, Martin Straka and Don Beaupre to the New York Islanders in exchange for Wade Redden and Damian Rhodes.

Berard joined the Islanders for 1996–97 season and made an immediate impact. With 48 points in his rookie season, he led all defensemen on the team, and finished ninth league-wide in scoring amongst defensemen. He was rewarded for his efforts by winning the Calder Trophy as the top rookie in the NHL, edging out Jarome Iginla. He also played for the United States in the 1998 Winter Olympics. The team finished sixth. After three years with the Islanders, the team was concerned with his ability to play defense and were in search of a proven goaltender. The Islanders traded Berard to the Toronto Maple Leafs for goaltender Félix Potvin on January 9, 1999.

=== Toronto Maple Leafs and injury ===
Berard put up 19 points in 38 games with the Maple Leafs, and played 17 more contests in the postseason. In his second year with the club, he had 30 points in 64 games when on March 11, 2000, during a game against the Senators in Ottawa, the stick of the Senators' Marián Hossa clipped Berard in the right eye on a follow through. The eye was severely slashed on the sclera which resulted in a retinal tear and a detached retina. In the hospital after the incident, after being told he might lose his eye, Berard reportedly told his friends that he would play hockey again. Despite that optimism, he received a $6.5 million settlement from his insurance company, for what many considered to be a career-ending injury.

Berard missed the 2000–01 season and underwent seven eye operations, improving his vision in the eye to 20/600. He started working out again in April 2001 and started skating again months thereafter. Berard was later fitted with a contact lens that allowed him to meet the league's minimum vision requirement of 20/400. He became an unrestricted free agent in 2001.

=== Free agency ===
When it became apparent that he might play again, the Maple Leafs stated they were interested in his services, but Berard opted to play for a team that was currently rebuilding and was a bit closer to his home of Woonsocket. Upon signing a tryout contract with the New York Rangers, he returned his insurance settlement and risked a comeback to the NHL. He played well enough that his tryout contract turned into a $2 million contract for the 2001–02 season, plus two one-year options that could have turned it into a $9.75 million pact. However, his option was not exercised by the Rangers after a disappointing season where he only scored 2 goals and 23 points despite playing in all 82 games for the Rangers.

Berard then inked a one-year deal with an option for a second year to join the Boston Bruins. With Boston, Berard began to return to his pre-injury form posting ten goals and 38 points, his highest total since his second year in the league. Despite his success, the Bruins balked when an arbitrator awarded Berard a $2.51 million contract and they walked away from the ruling, making him an unrestricted free agent.

The Chicago Blackhawks offered him a $2.01 million deal and signed him to a one-year contract. In Chicago, Berard's game continued to improve and he finished the year second on the team in scoring with 47 points, just one off his career best. He capped his year by being awarded the Bill Masterton Trophy for his dedication to hockey. With his career seemingly on the upswing, the Blackhawks and Berard agreed on a one-year $3 million contract for the 2004–05 campaign. Blackhawks general manager Bob Pulford was eager to have him back, saying "His point production was right up there with the best defensemen. He excels on the power play and that's a huge part of the game now. It was important for us to get him under contract." But the season was ultimately cancelled due to the 2004–05 NHL lockout and with a new general manager replacing Pulford, Berard was not tendered an offer for the 2005–06 season.

As a free agent, Berard landed a two-year deal with the Columbus Blue Jackets. Columbus GM Doug MacLean felt that Berard's skillset was a perfect fit for his club, saying "Bryan brings a level of speed to our blue line that we've never had in the past," adding, "With a more wide-open game coming in the NHL, Bryan should really flourish and we're excited about what he adds to our hockey team." While Berard had overcome the limitations of his vision to become a solid offensive defensemen, his time in Columbus would be marred by troubles with his back. His first season with the Blue Jackets saw him post impressive numbers with 12 goals and 32 points in just 44 games but a back injury - and subsequent surgery - shut him down in March. In October, when he should have been gearing up for his second year with the club, he had another surgery to repair a herniated disc in his back and managed to play just eleven games with the Jackets. In late February, just before the trade deadline, the team waived Berard, ending his time in Columbus.

Berard accepted an invitation to attend training camp for the 2007–08 season with the Islanders and performed well enough to earn a one-year contract. In his first game back with his original NHL team, Berard scored the game-winning goal in a 2–1 Islander victory against another of his former teams, the Rangers. Berard managed just five goals and 22 points that season.

=== European career and retirement ===
Prior to the start of the 2008–09 NHL season, Berard was invited to training camp with the Philadelphia Flyers. He was not offered a contract despite tallying three assists in Philadelphia's camp. Berard signed on November 16, 2008, with Vityaz Chekhov of the Kontinental Hockey League (KHL). He scored 17 points in 25 games played. Berard retired after the 2008–09 season due to problems with his back.

== Post-retirement ==
Berard lives in Greenwich Village, Manhattan. In 2011, he appeared on season 3 of the CBC Television's Battle of the Blades.

He was a victim, along with many other NHL players, of a scam run by financial advisor Phil Kenner, who was eventually sentenced to 17 years in prison for the scam.

== Positive drug test ==
In early 2006, it was revealed that he had tested positive for an anabolic steroid known as 19-norandrosterone, in a drug test he had taken in November 2005. He was the first NHL player ever to test positive for steroids. As they did not administer the test, the NHL did not hand down any form of suspension to Berard, but he was banned from international play for two years effective January 3, 2006. Berard said after the incident, "I made a mistake that resulted in a suspension and, while unintentional, I take full responsibility. I became aware of this problem after the fact, and for that, I am disappointed in myself."

== Awards and honors ==
- NHL All-Rookie Team, 1997
- Calder Memorial Trophy, 1997
- Bill Masterton Memorial Trophy, 2004
- Inducted into the Rhode Island Hockey Hall of Fame, 2018

== Career statistics ==
=== Regular season and playoffs ===
			Regular season					Playoffs
Season	Team	League	GP	G	A	Pts	PIM	GP	G	A	Pts	PIM
1991–92	Mount St. Charles Academy	HS-RI	15	3	15	18	4	—	—	—	—	—
1992–93	Mount St. Charles Academy	HS-RI	15	8	12	20	18	—	—	—	—	—
1993–94	Mount St. Charles Academy	HS-RI	15	11	26	37	4	4	3	3	6	6
1994–95	Detroit Junior Red Wings	OHL	58	20	55	75	97	21	4	20	24	38
1994–95	Detroit Junior Red Wings	MC	—	—	—	—	—	5	1	3	4	6
1995–96	Detroit Whalers	OHL	56	31	58	89	116	17	7	18	25	41
1996–97	New York Islanders	NHL	82	8	40	48	86	—	—	—	—	—
1997–98	New York Islanders	NHL	75	14	32	46	59	—	—	—	—	—
1998–99	New York Islanders	NHL	34	4	11	15	26	—	—	—	—	—
1998–99	Toronto Maple Leafs	NHL	38	5	14	19	22	17	1	8	9	8
1999–2000	Toronto Maple Leafs	NHL	64	3	27	30	42	—	—	—	—	—
2001–02	New York Rangers	NHL	82	2	21	23	60	—	—	—	—	—
2002–03	Boston Bruins	NHL	80	10	28	38	64	3	1	0	1	2
2003–04	Chicago Blackhawks	NHL	58	13	34	47	53	—	—	—	—	—
2005–06	Columbus Blue Jackets	NHL	44	12	20	32	32	—	—	—	—	—
2006–07	Columbus Blue Jackets	NHL	11	0	3	3	8	—	—	—	—	—
2007–08	New York Islanders	NHL	54	5	17	22	48	—	—	—	—	—
2008–09	Vityaz Chekhov	KHL	25	3	14	17	103	—	—	—	—	—
NHL totals			619	76	247	323	500	20	2	8	10	10

=== International ===
Year	Team	Event	GP	G	A	Pts	PIM
1995	United States	WJC	7	0	1	1	36
1996	United States	WJC	6	1	4	5	20
1997	United States	WC	1	1	0	1	0
1998	United States	OG	4	0	0	0	0
Junior totals			13	1	5	6	56
Senior totals			5	1	0	1	0

== See also ==
- List of sportspeople sanctioned for doping offences

Preceded by Ed Jovanovski	NHL first overall draft pick 1995	Succeeded by Chris Phillips
Preceded by Radek Bonk	Ottawa Senators first-round draft pick 1995	Succeeded by Chris Phillips
Preceded by Daniel Alfredsson	Winner of the Calder Memorial Trophy; 1997	Succeeded by Sergei Samsonov
Preceded by Steve Yzerman	Winner of the Bill Masterton Memorial Trophy; 2004	Succeeded by Teemu Selanne
