= Barrington Public Schools (Rhode Island) =

School district in Rhode Island, United States

Address
- 283 County Road Barrington, Rhode Island, 02806; United States

District information
- Type: Public
- Grades: K–12
- Superintendent: Bob Mitchell (interim)

Other information
- Website: barringtonschools.org

Barrington Public Schools is a public primary and secondary education school district located in Barrington, a suburban town located in Bristol County, Rhode Island. It consists of four elementary schools, and a single middle school and high school.

== Elementary schools ==
The four elementary schools in the Barrington Public Schools district are:

- Nayatt Elementary School (1st through 3rd)
- Primrose Hill Elementary School (1st through 3rd)
- Sowams Elementary School (1st through 3rd)
- Hampden Meadows School (4th and 5th grade only)

== Middle and High school ==
=== Barrington Middle School ===
Barrington Middle School (founded as West Barrington Junior High) is the only middle school in Barrington, serving about 850 students during the 2017 school year. Barrington Middle School was constructed in 1959, and enlarged in 1969. In 2014, Barrington Middle School was named a National Blue Ribbon School. Just after the end of the 2018-2019 school year, the school building was torn down to finish the construction of a new middle school that had been under construction for about a year. The new building cost $68 million to build.

=== Barrington High School ===
Barrington High School is the only high school in Barrington. Constructed in 1951, amidst a period of population growth in Barrington, it has been named a National Blue Ribbon School and has been ranked as the number one high school in Rhode Island by U.S. News & World Report.
