= Harry Pattee =

American baseball player and coach (1882-1971)

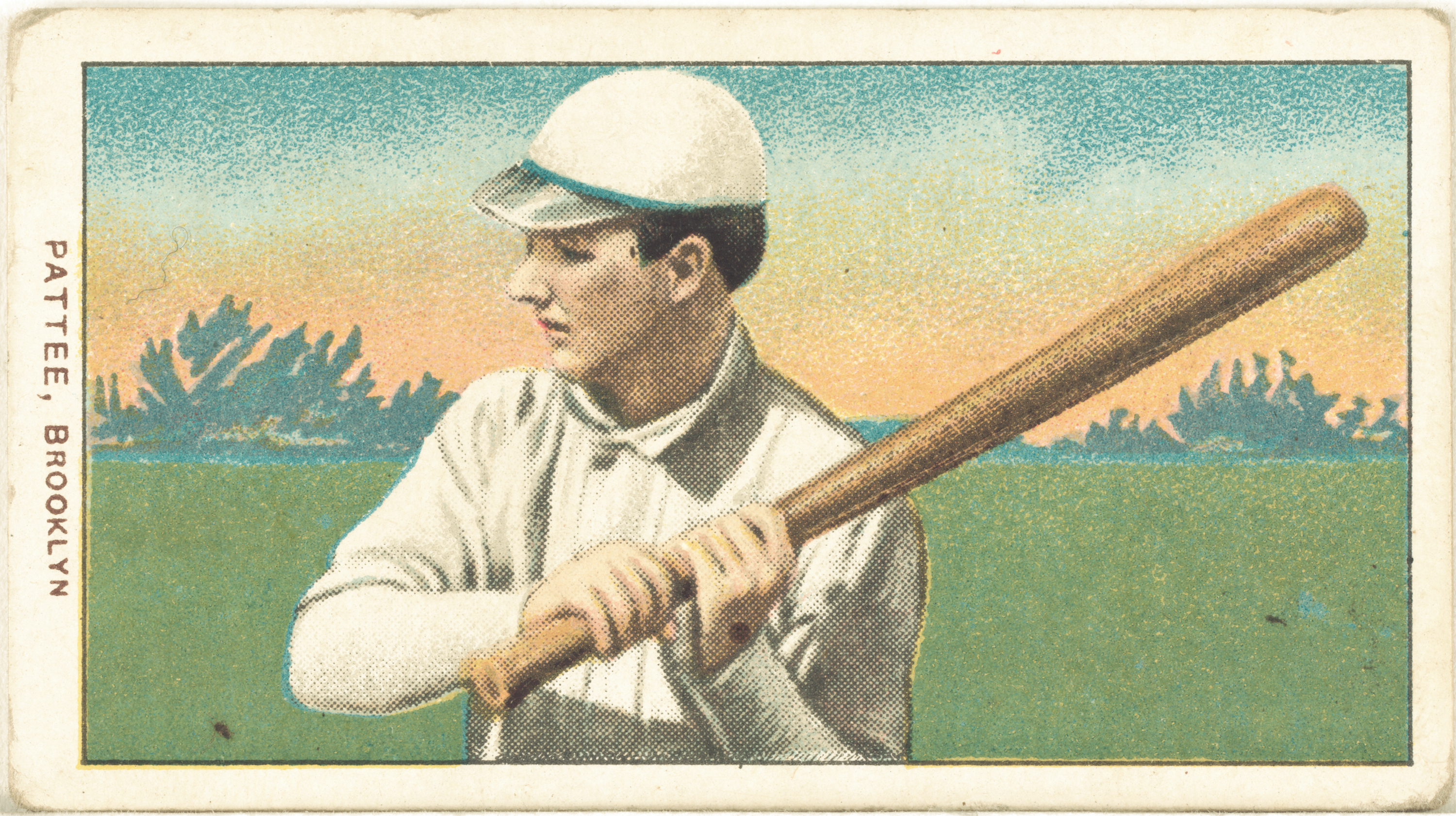
- Second baseman
- Born: January 17, 1882; Charlestown, Massachusetts, U.S.
- Died: July 17, 1971 (aged 89); Lynchburg, Virginia, U.S.
- Batted: Left Threw: Right

MLB debut
- April 14, 1908, for the Brooklyn Superbas

Last MLB appearance
- September 29, 1908, for the Brooklyn Superbas

MLB statistics
- Batting average: .216
- Home runs: 0
- Runs batted in: 9
- Stolen bases: 24
- Stats at Baseball Reference

Teams
- Brooklyn Superbas (1908)

Harry Ernest Pattee (January 17, 1882 – July 17, 1971) was an American professional baseball player who played second base for the 1908 Brooklyn Superbas. He went to college at Brown University.

Pattee's son, Jay Pattee, was the head football and basketball coach for Stetson University and was a collegiate athlete for Brown University.
