= Mount Saint Charles Academy =

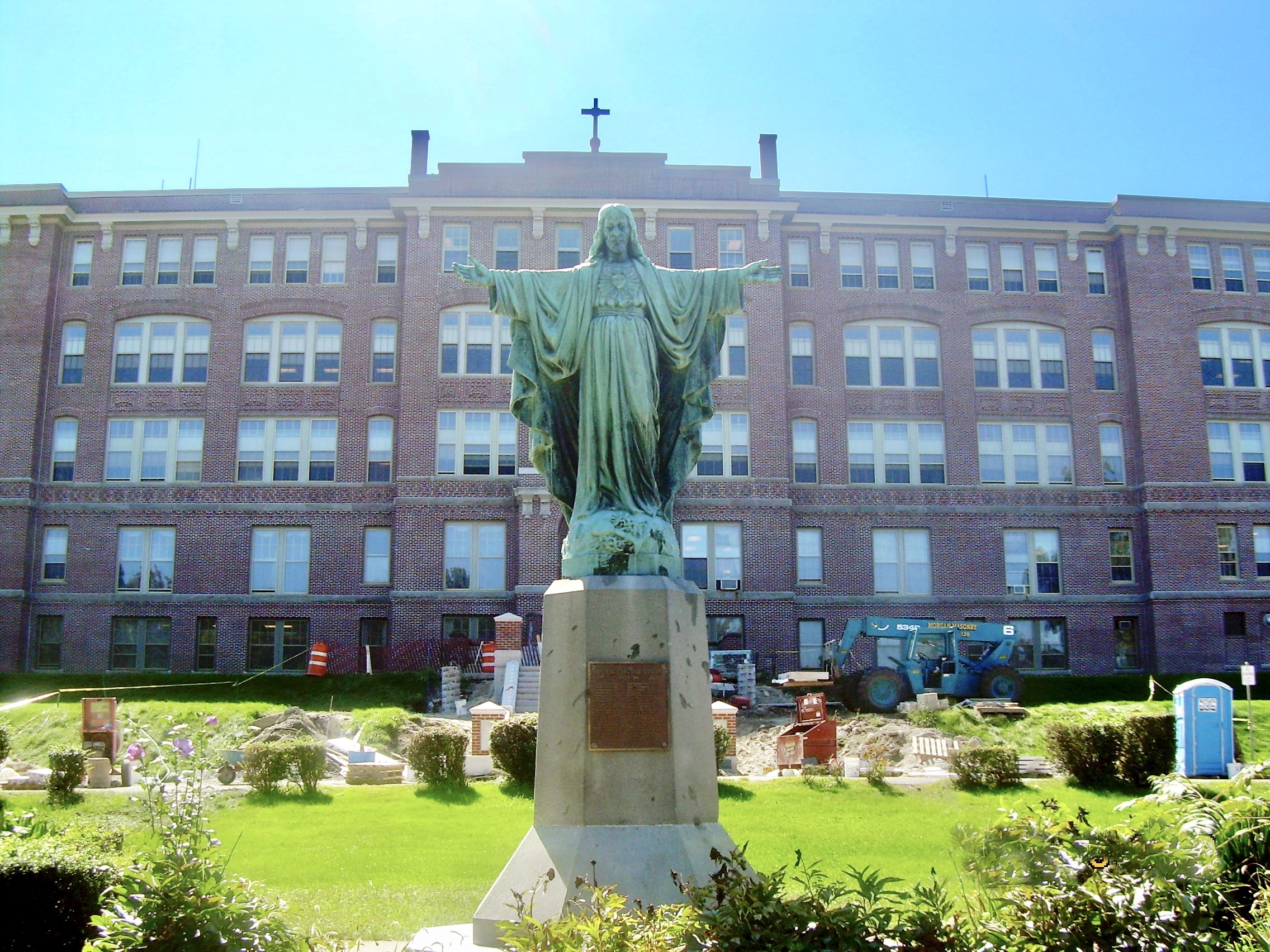
- The front of Mount Saint Charles Academy

Location
- 800 Logee Street; Woonsocket, (Providence County), Rhode Island 02895-5599; United States; 41°59′46″N 71°30′7″W

Information
- Type: Private, Catholic, Coeducational junior/senior high school institution
- Religious affiliations: Roman Catholic, (Brothers of the Sacred Heart)
- Established: September 14, 1924
- Oversight: Diocese of Providence
- President: Alan Tenreiro
- Principal: Julie Beauvais
- Grades: 6–12
- Enrollment: 850
- Campus size: 22 acres (89,000 m^{2})
- Campus type: Urban
- Color: Scarlet - Blue - White
- Team name: Mounties
- Accreditation: New England Association of Schools and Colleges
- Newspaper: The Hilltopper
- Yearbook: Excelsior
- Website: www.mountsaintcharles.org

Mount Saint Charles Academy is a private, Roman Catholic, co-educational junior and senior high school academy in Woonsocket, Rhode Island, within the Roman Catholic Diocese of Providence.

== History ==
In 1919, the Federation of Canadian Catholic Churches in America announced plans to build a Catholic high school in Woonsocket, a community with a majority French-Canadian population. As the local population started fundraising for the new school, they learned that Hickey was only going to allow classes there to be taught in English. For decades, the diocese had fostered French-language schools and had recruited both French and French-Canadian sisters to teach there. However, by the 1920s, dioceses across the United States were switching to English instruction.

On September 14, 1924, Monsignor Charles Dauray and the congregation of the Brothers of the Sacred Heart opened Mount St. Charles Academy. However, the parents were outraged that classes would be in English. Elphege Daignault, a Woonsocket lawyer, started organizing a protest movement. In one swipe at Hickey, who had Irish parents, he labeled the Irish-American clergy in the diocese as “national assassins". While Daignault had wide support in the parish, not everyone agree with his vitriolic attacks on Hickey and other Irish clergy.

in 1924, the dissidents founded the newspaper La Sentinelle, to express their opposition. The dissidents were now called Sentinellists. They first appealed Hickey's decision to Archbishop Pietro Fumasoni-Biondi, the apostolic delegate, or Vatican representative, to the United States. When that appeal failed, Daignault sued the diocese in state court in Rhode Island. The Rhode Island Supreme Court eventually ruled against him, saying that it had no jurisdiction in church affairs. By this point, the controversy had gained publicity in French-Canadian communities throughout the United States and Canada. The Sentinellists finally sent a delegation to the Vatican to appeal directly to Pope Pius XI; he refused to see them.

The gymnasium was added in 1927, followed by the Brother Adelard Ice Hockey Arena in 1963. The arena, named after the "Father of Schoolboy Hockey," Brother Adelard Beaudet, was the first hockey arena built for the exclusive use of one school.

By the 1970s, the academy transitioned to a Grade 7–12 co-educational day school. The transition occurred concurrently with the closing of the all-girls high school in the city. This marked the beginning of a decline of Catholic schools in America, followed by a diminished interest in boarding schools. By 2015, Mount Saint Charles was expanded, including the 6th grade.

The school was accredited by the New England Association of Schools and Colleges in 2019 and has been recognized twice as a Blue Ribbon School of Excellence by the U.S. Department of Education.

In 2009, the school announced that Mr. Hervé Richer Jr. would become the first lay president of Mount Saint Charles. Mr. Edwin Burke, the former assistant principal, assumed the role of the principal.

In March 2016, it was announced that the school would not enroll transgender students. This was also included as a statement in the school's handbook. Alumni of the school used social media and created a petition to oppose this announcement. The school released a response, stating that their intent was not discriminatory, and that their facilities could not accommodate gender diverse students. The school cancelled the policy three days afterwards.

In 2017, Hervé Richer stepped down as president. Alan Tenreiro, a 1992 graduate of the school, was selected as the third president of Mount Saint Charles Academy. Tenreiro was named National Principal of the Year in 2016 by NASSP for his contributions to Cumberland High School.

In 2019, the school received $3.7 million from Educational Institutional Revenue Bonds in order to create a new residence hall. The residence hall was opened in October 2019 to house 70 students for the first time in nearly 50 years.

== Arts ==
The school offers the following arts programs:

- Stage bands
- Jazz bands
- Brass choirs
- String ensembles
- Chorus
- Dance
- Yearbook
- Hand-bell choirs
- Theater

== Campus ministry ==
In collaboration with the Religious Studies Department, the Office of Campus Ministry provides a range of experiences intended to form a more reflective faith community. Campus ministers oversee activities such as the Mission Drive, Annual Christmas Baskets, and Days of Recollection.

== Athletics ==
The Mount Saint Charles Academy boys' hockey team won twenty-six consecutive state titles from 1978 to 2003 and four consecutive titles from 2008 to 2011. Over the years, 20 alumni have entered into the NHL. Alumni Brian Lawton and Bryan Berard were drafted 1st overall in the NHL entry draft. The school's hockey program is recorded in the book "Pride on the Mount" by John Gillooly. The current coach, Normand "Bill" Belisle, has a record of 990 wins, 183 losses, and 37 ties. In 2006, a documentary was created called Ice Kings, which encompasses the material covered in the book, including insights from alumni and Coach Belisle.

The school won back to back Division II state titles in boys soccer 2004 and 2005 before moving up to Division I in 2006.

The swim team had a leap from Division III to Division I, making it the first team in RIIL history to move two divisions in a year.

In 2015, the boy's varsity soccer team won the Division II state championship over Moses Brown.

In 2021, Mount St. Charles Hockey Academy was one of two schools to have all four tournament bound teams (18U, 16U, 15O and 14U) qualify for their respective National Tournaments.

In 2022, the boy's Varsity Lacrosse team was the first team in RIIL history to win two back-to-back State Championships in 2 separate divisions (Division IV in 2021 and Division II in 2022).

In 2023, the school announced that it was leaving the Rhode Island Interscholastic League to play for the New England Preparatory School Athletic Council.

State Championships
Season	Sport	Number of Championships	Year
Fall	Soccer, Men's	5	1999, 2000, 2004, 2005, 2015
Fall	Tennis, Women's	5	2002, 2004, 2005, 2007, 2008
Fall	Volleyball, Women's	2	1995, 2009
Winter	Hockey, Men's	45	1933, 1934, 1935, 1938, 1939, 1940, 1942, 1945, 1946, 1947, 1968, 1972, 1978, 1979, 1980, 1981, 1982, 1983, 1984, 1985, 1986, 1987, 1988, 1989, 1990, 1991, 1992, 1993, 1994, 1995, 1996, 1997, 1998, 1999, 2000, 2001, 2002, 2003, 2008, 2009, 2010, 2011, 2013, 2014, 2022 (18U National Championship)
Winter	Basketball, Women's	1	2001
Winter	Swimming, Men's	3	2002, 2003, 2004
Winter	Swimming, Women's	1	2003
Winter	Hockey, Women's	6	2002, 2003, 2006, 2007, 2010, 2011
Spring	Lacrosse, Men's	3	2008, 2021, 2022
Spring	Volleyball, Men's	5	2001, 2002, 2008, 2009, 2010, 2018
Spring	Baseball, Men's	3	2009, 2010, 2015
All	Cheerleading	4	2005, 2007, 2008, 2011
Total		83	

== Notable alumni ==
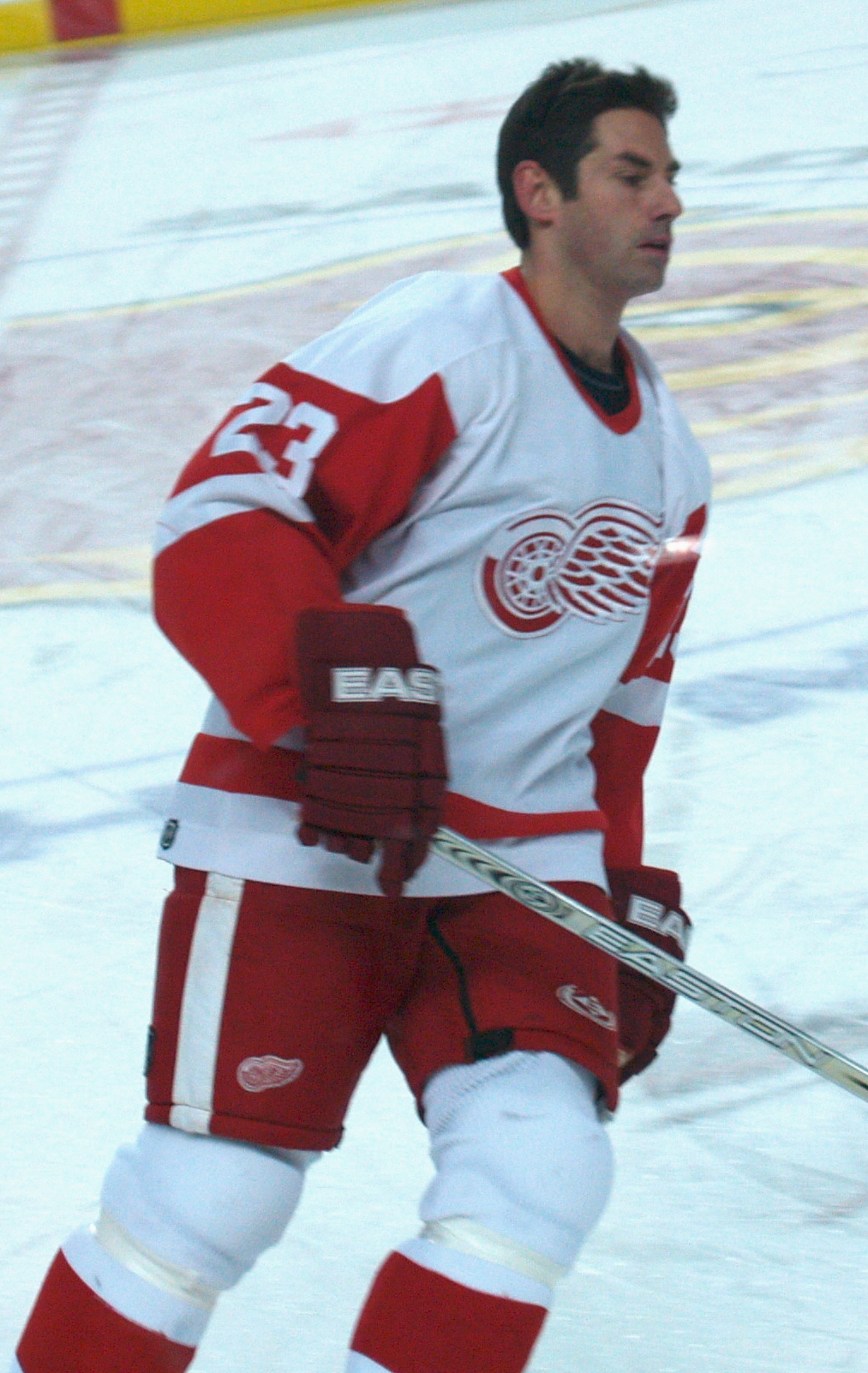
Mathieu Schneider

- Bryan Berard, ice hockey player
- Brian Boucher, ice hockey player
- Ed Bradley, journalist, 60 Minutes co-host (attended MSC)
- Jennifer Brien, radio host for WHJJ
- Keith Carney, ice hockey player
- Paul Guay, ice hockey
- Jeff Jillson, ice hockey player
- Brian Lawton, ice hockey player
- Johnny Martorano, number two to Whitey Bulger and known as "The Executioner" (graduated elsewhere, Milton High School)
- Ben Mondor, owner of Boston Red Sox AAA affiliate, Pawtucket Red Sox
- Mathieu Schneider, ice hockey player
- Garth Snow, ice hockey player, General Manager of the New York Islanders
- Erik Per Sullivan, actor on Malcolm in the Middle
- Deer Tick (band), drummer Dennis Ryan
- James Hagens, Ice Hockey player for the Boston Bruins, seventh pick in the first round of the 2025 NHL draft
- Carter Amico, Ice hockey player for the Philadelphia Flyers
- Conrad Fondrk, Ice hockey player for the New Jersey Devils
- Dave Capuano, Ice Hockey player

== See also ==
- Catholic schools in the United States
- Higher education
- List of Rhode Island schools
