= Rhode Island Interscholastic League =

High school activities organization

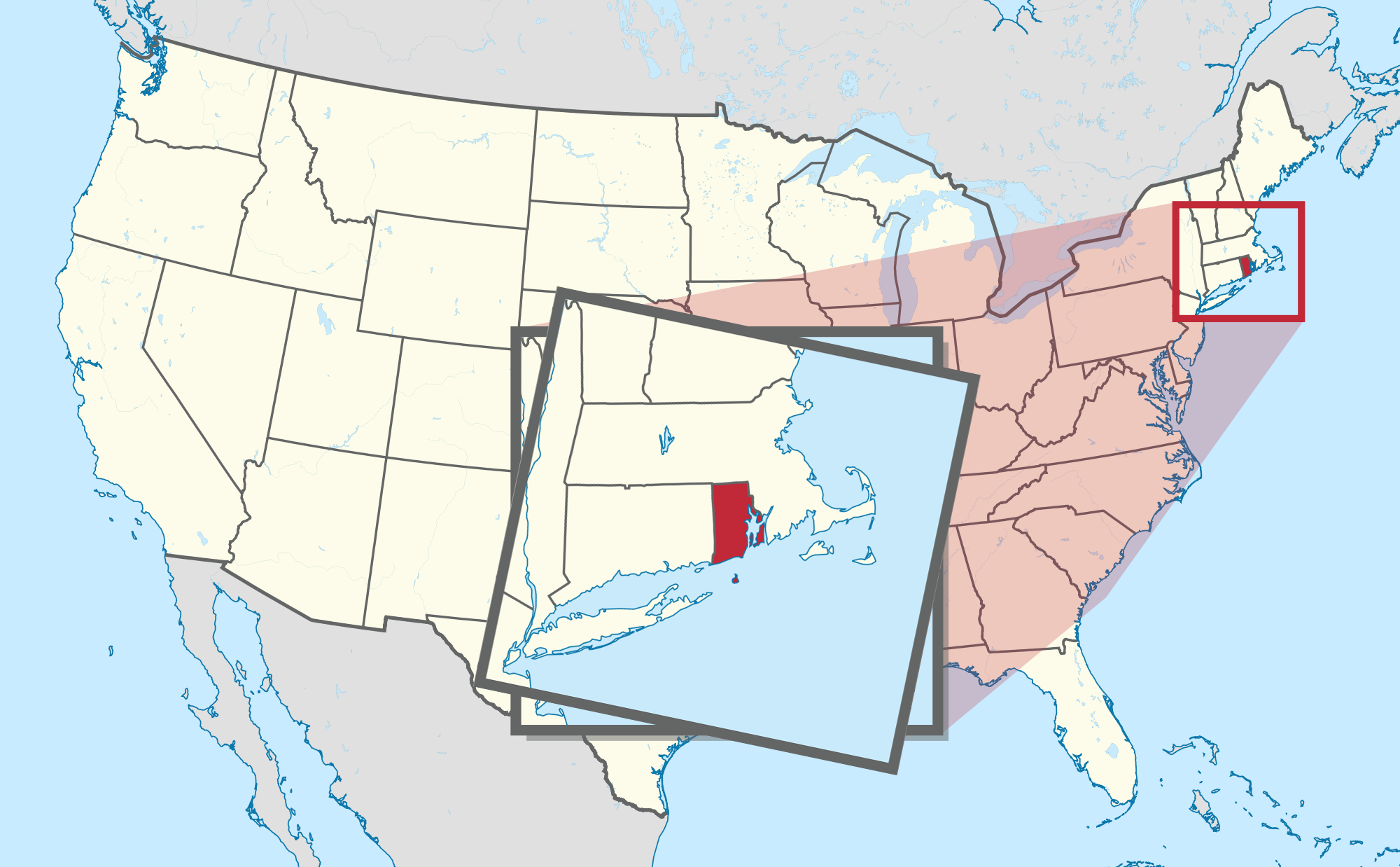
- Abbreviation: RIIL
- Formation: 1932
- Type: NPO
- Legal status: Association
- Purpose: Athletic/Educational
- Headquarters: 875 Centerville Road; Warwick, Rhode Island
- Region served: Rhode Island
- Affiliations: National Federation of State High School Associations
- Website: riil.org

The Rhode Island Interscholastic League (RIIL) is an organization that runs and regulates interscholastic high school activities in the U.S. state of Rhode Island. A total of 54 public and private schools participate in the league and about 20,000 students annually compete in RIIL sanctioned events.

== Sports offered ==
=== Fall ===
- Boys' & Girls' Cross Country
- Girls' Field Hockey
- Football
- Girls' Tennis
- UnifiedVolleyball (Note: This sport is hosted in collaboration with the Special Olympics, along with Unified Basketball.)
- Boys' & Girls' Soccer
- Girls' Volleyball

=== Winter ===
- Boys' & Girls' Basketball
- Competition Cheerleading
- Gymnastics
- Boys' & Girls' hockey
- Boys' & Girls' Indoor Track
- Boys' & Girls' Swimming
- Wrestling

=== Spring ===
- Baseball
- Girls' Fastpitch softball
- Boys' & Girls' Lacrosse
- Golf
- Boys' Tennis
- Boys' & Girls' Outdoor Track
- Unified Basketball (Note: This sport is hosted in collaboration with the Special Olympics, along with Unified Volleyball.)

== Mount St. Charles hockey dynasty ==
The Mount Saint Charles Academy Mounties boys' ice hockey team captured the RIIL state title 26 times in a row from 1978 to 2003.

== See also ==
- Rhode Island High School Championships
