= Nino Niederreiter =

Swiss ice hockey player (born 1992)

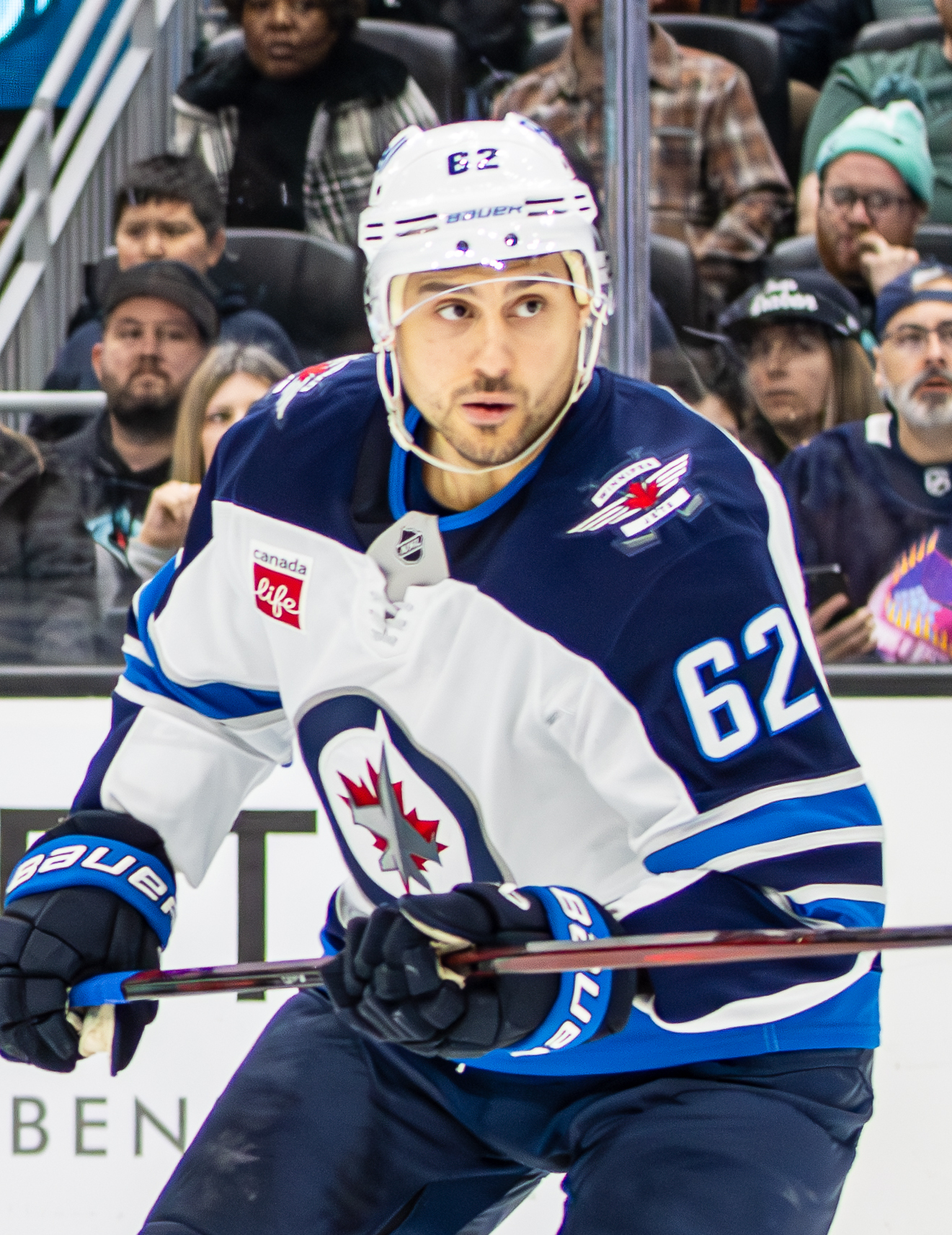
- Niederreiter with the Winnipeg Jets in 2025
- Born: 8 September 1992 (age 33) Chur, Switzerland
- Height: 6 ft 2 in (188 cm)
- Weight: 218 lb (99 kg; 15 st 8 lb)
- Position: Winger
- Shoots: Left
- NHL team Former teams: Winnipeg Jets; HC Davos; New York Islanders; Minnesota Wild; Carolina Hurricanes; Nashville Predators
- National team: Switzerland
- NHL draft: 5th overall, 2010; New York Islanders
- Playing career: 2009–present

Nino Niederreiter (born 8 September 1992) is a Swiss professional ice hockey player who is a winger for the Winnipeg Jets of the National Hockey League (NHL). He was selected fifth overall by the New York Islanders in the 2010 NHL entry draft, making him the highest-drafted Swiss hockey player in NHL history at the time (until Nico Hischier was drafted first overall in 2017). Niederreiter made his NHL debut with the Islanders early in the 2010–11 season before being returned to his junior club, the Portland Winterhawks of the Western Hockey League (WHL). Prior to coming to North America, Niederreiter had played in the junior system of the Swiss team HC Davos and appeared in three playoff games for the senior club in 2010.

After finding difficulty securing playtime with the Islanders, Niederreiter requested a trade and subsequently was dealt to the Minnesota Wild, where he spent parts of five seasons. In his sixth year with the Wild, he was traded to the Carolina Hurricanes, where he signed a contract to play for the following three seasons. Afterwards, he signed with the Nashville Predators, who traded him to the Jets after only part of a season when the team was falling out of playoff contention.

== Playing career ==
=== Juniors ===
Unlike many Swiss hockey players, Niederreiter opted to play hockey in North American junior hockey to give him a better shot of making the National Hockey League (NHL). Past Swiss first-round draft picks Luca Cereda and Michel Riesen were known in hockey circles as "Swiss misses", as they never made an impact in the NHL. Niederreiter followed in the footsteps of his Swiss teammate and friend Luca Sbisa and declared himself eligible for the Canadian Hockey League Import Draft. He was drafted by the Portland Winterhawks of the Western Hockey League (WHL) and enjoyed success in his rookie year.

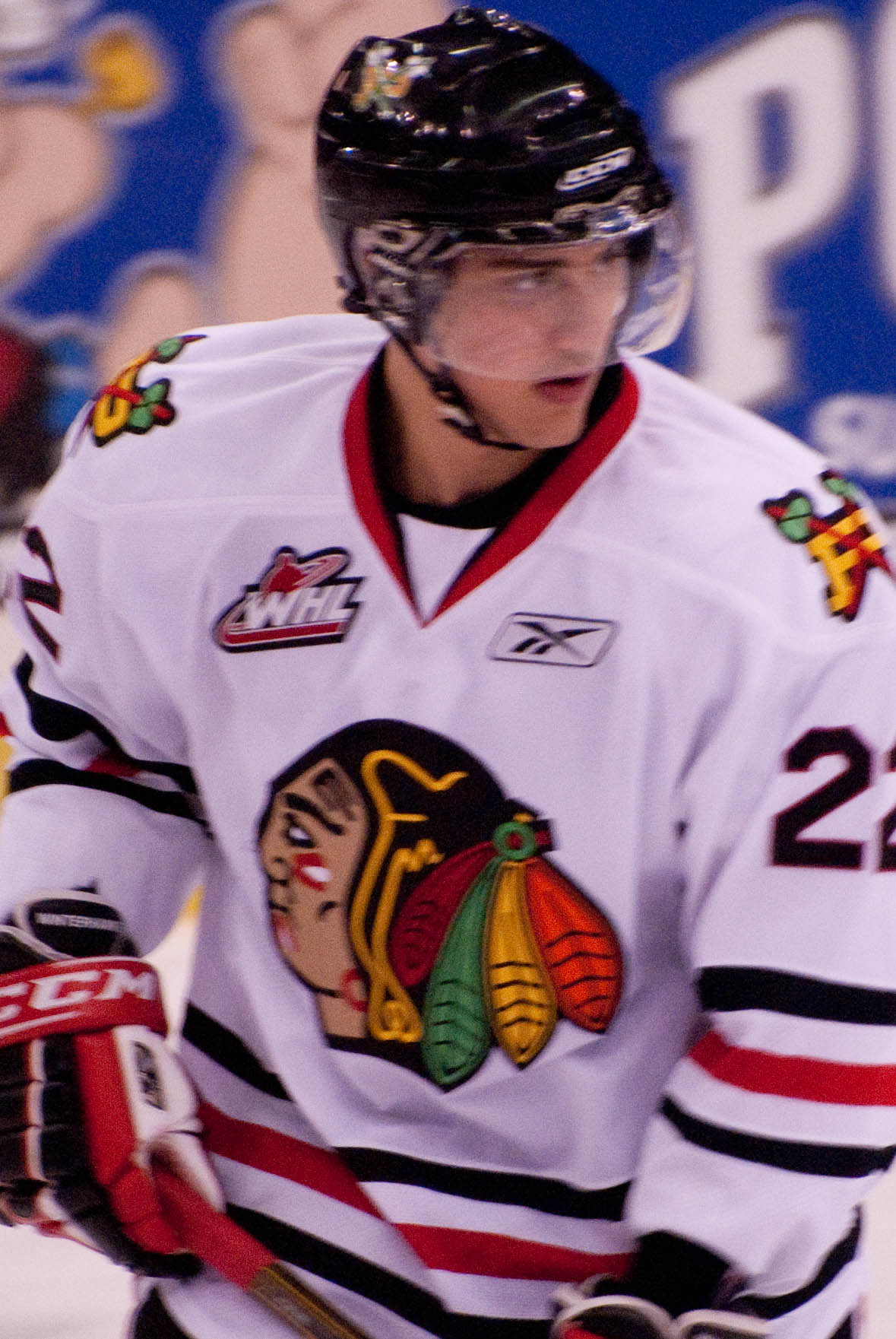
Niederreiter with the Winterhawks in November 2010

While playing with Portland, Niederreiter was selected to play in the prestigious CHL Top Prospects Game to play for coach Bobby Orr. After scoring a fantastic "trick shot" goal in the trick shot competition during the skills competition on 20 January 2010, Niederreiter opened the scoring during the actual game the following day. He scored with 2:38 remaining in the first period on top-ranked goaltender Calvin Pickard to give Team Orr a 1–0 lead at the break. Team Cherry would eventually win 4–2. In Niederreiter's first season of North American play and rookie season for the Winterhawks, he led them in goals with 36. This total also ranked him 18th across the WHL and second amongst WHL rookies. He added 24 assists, for 60 points on the season, good for fourth on the Winterhawks. He recorded a further 16 points in 13 playoff games, second-best on the team. The WHL recognized Niederreiter by selecting him to the Western Conference Second All-Star Team.

The NHL Central Scouting Bureau predicted that Niederreiter would become just the fourth Swiss ice hockey player be drafted in the first round in the 2010 NHL entry draft. TSN hockey analyst Bob McKenzie believed that he could become the highest-drafted Swiss player in history. Niederreiter was ranked 14th by the NHL Central Scouting Bureau amongst North American trained players in its midterm rankings. The NHL Central Scouting Bureau ranked Niederreiter 12th in its final rankings for the draft. Those predictions came to fruition when he was selected by the New York Islanders with the fifth overall pick. At the time, he was the highest-drafted Swiss hockey player in NHL history; he held this record until 2017, when the New Jersey Devils' Nico Hischier became the first Swiss player to be selected first overall.

=== Professional ===
==== New York Islanders ====
Niederreiter was selected fifth overall by the New York Islanders and was the first European drafted (albeit North American trained) player. He began the 2010–11 season at the NHL level after signing a three-year, entry-level contract. In making his NHL debut on 9 October 2010, he became the youngest player in Islanders' history to appear in an NHL game (surpassing Dave Chyzowski's record). Niederreiter scored his first career NHL goal on 13 October against goaltender Michal Neuvirth of the Washington Capitals. With the goal, Niederreiter, at the age of 18 years and 35 days, became the youngest Islander and the fifth-youngest NHL player in the expansion era (post-1967) to score an NHL goal; the only younger players to score in the NHL since expansion were Aleksander Barkov (18 years, 31 days), Grant Mulvey (18 years, 32 days), Jordan Staal (18 years, 32 days) and Patrick Marleau (18 years, 34 days). On 28 October, the Islanders announced that they would return Niederreiter to the Winterhawks for further development. As he played only nine games in the NHL, Niederreiter did not use up a year on his NHL contract; had he played ten games, it would have counted as a full year.

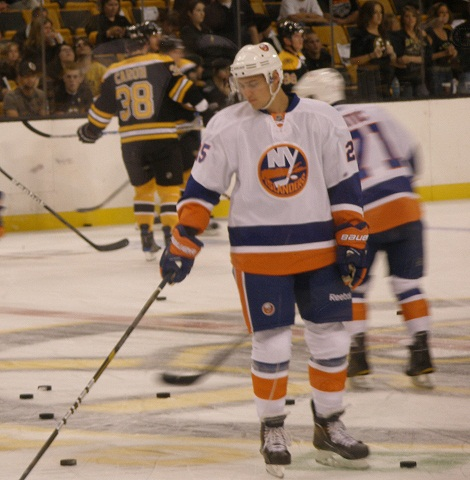
Niederreiter with the Islanders in September 2010

With Portland, Niederreiter enjoyed a career year with 41 goals and 29 assists for 70 points in 55 games.

Niederreiter spent the 2011–12 season as a member of the Islanders, where he was used primarily on the fourth line to gain experience alongside defensive veterans Marty Reasoner and Jay Pandolfo.

As a result of the 2012–13 NHL lockout, Niederreiter was assigned to the Islanders' American Hockey League (AHL) affiliate, the Bridgeport Sound Tigers. Following the conclusion of the lockout, Niederreiter was not invited to the Islanders' training camp and reportedly asked for a trade as a result. Islanders' general manager Garth Snow indicated that the relationship between the player and the organization was fine, stating, "[A]ll conversations with players remain private, but I will say that Nino has never told me that he's unhappy."

==== Minnesota Wild ====
On 30 June 2013, Niederreiter was traded to the Minnesota Wild in exchange for Cal Clutterbuck and the New Jersey Devils' third-round pick in the 2013 NHL entry draft. He saw much more ice time and was given more opportunity than he had previously had in New York and was in the Wild's top-six forward group throughout most of the season. With the Islanders, in 64 games Niederreiter recorded 2 goals and 1 assist. In his first full season with the Wild, he improved to 14 goals and 22 assists (36 points) in 81 games.

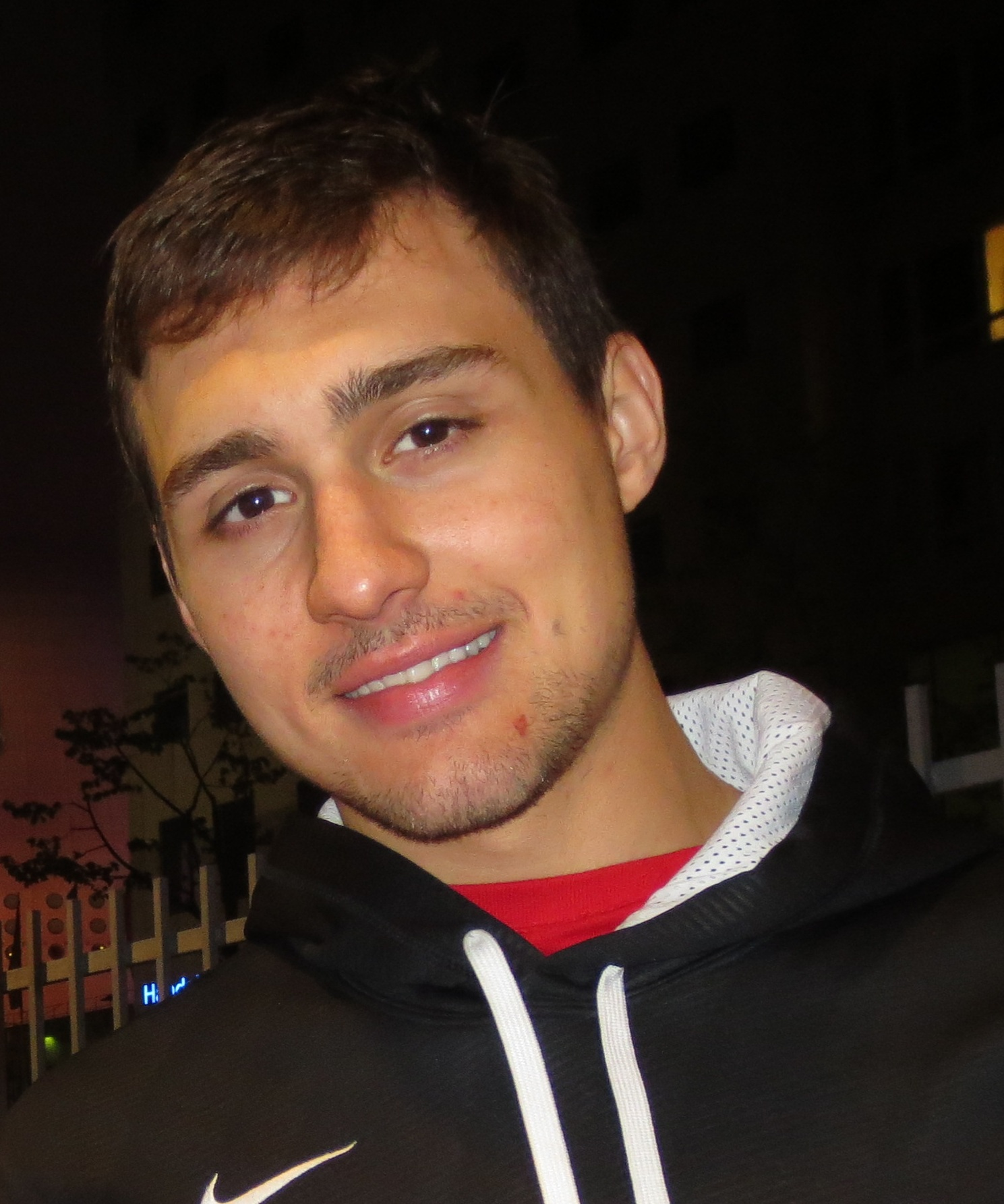
Niederreiter in 2013

On 17 April 2014, Niederreiter made his Stanley Cup playoff debut in Game 1 of Minnesota first-round series against the Colorado Avalanche; he recorded an assist in the Wild's eventual 5–4 overtime loss. In Game 7 of the series, Niederreiter recorded two goals and one assist, including the game winner in overtime to advance the Wild to the second round of the playoffs.

On 11 September 2014, just prior to the 2014–15 season, Niederreiter signed a new three-year, $8 million contract with the Wild.

During the 2015–16 season, Niederreiter was placed on a line with Erik Haula and Jason Pominville. Despite being the third line for the Wild, it quickly became one of the team's most effective lines with high offensive totals, even while being matched up against opponent's top lines. Niederreiter finished the regular season third in goals scored for Minnesota, behind Zach Parise and Charlie Coyle.

On 30 July 2017, Niederreiter and the Wild avoided salary arbitration by agreeing to a new five-year, $26.25 million contract worth an average annual value of $5.25 million.

==== Carolina Hurricanes ====
On 17 January 2019, Niederreiter was traded to the Carolina Hurricanes in exchange for Victor Rask. Niederreiter and Rask's offensive production had slipped with their previous teams, and the teams hoped that a change in scenery would benefit the respective players and organizations. Neiderreiter's scoring, which had only amounted to nine goals and 23 points in 46 games with the Wild that season, improved as the Hurricanes had hoped. In the remaining 36 games Neiderreiter played with Carolina, he scored 14 goals and 30 points, nearly as many as he had with Minnesota for the entire previous season.

==== Nashville Predators and Winnipeg Jets ====
On 21 July 2022, Niederreiter as a free agent signed a two-year, $8 million contract with the Nashville Predators. However, despite good production from Neiderreiter with 18 goals through 56 games, the Predators struggled to stay competitive in the 2022–23 season. On 25 February 2023, Neiderreiter was traded to Central Division rivals, the Winnipeg Jets, in exchange for a second-round pick in the 2024 NHL entry draft.

On 4 December 2023, Niedderreiter re-signed a three-year, $12 million contract with the Jets. Niederreiter played his 1,000th NHL game on December 13, 2025, becoming the first Swiss-born and 416th overall player to reach the mark.

== International play ==
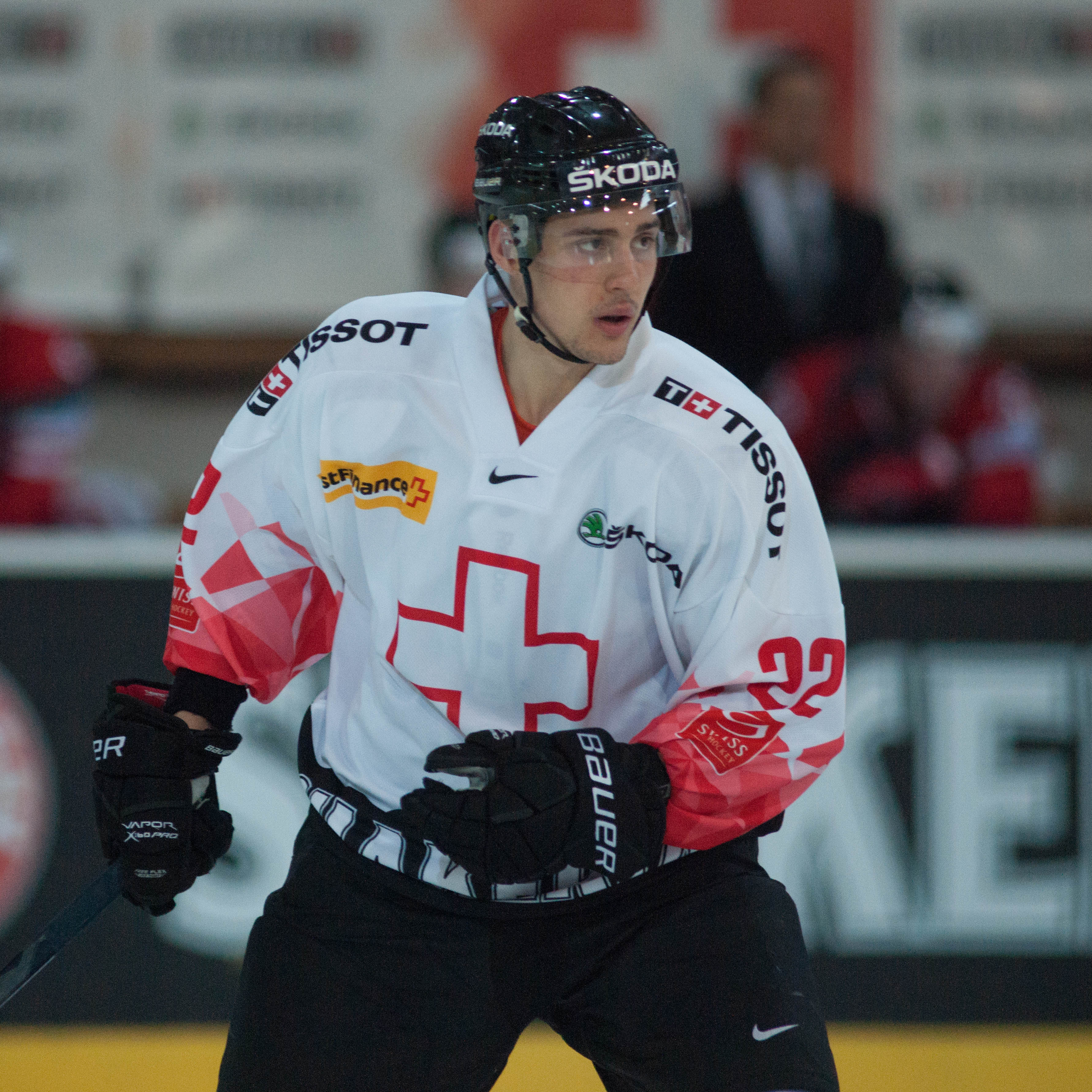

Medal record

Ice hockey

Representing Switzerland

World Championships
| Silver medal – second place | 2013 Sweden/Finland | |
| Silver medal – second place | 2018 Denmark | |
| Silver medal – second place | 2024 Czechia | |
| Silver medal – second place | 2025 Sweden/Denmark | |
| Silver medal – second place | 2026 Switzerland | |

Niederreiter first played in an international tournament when he took part in the 2008 IIHF World U18 Championships held in Russia for the Switzerland men's national under-18 ice hockey team. Switzerland finished eighth overall, and Niederreiter scored two points in six games. He next appeared at the 2009 edition of the tournament in the United States and recorded six points in six games as the Swiss again finished eighth.

At the 2010 World Junior Ice Hockey Championships, Niederreiter led the Switzerland men's national junior ice hockey team to an upset of Russia by scoring two goals in a 3–2 victory; his first goal came in the final minute of regulation play to send the game to overtime, and his second was the overtime winner. He finished the tournament with six goals and four assists, sufficient for ranking seventh amongst all tournament skaters. He was also selected to the tournament all-star team.

During the tournament, Niederreiter and Canada's Nazem Kadri attracted attention for Kadri's refusal to shake hands with Niederreiter after their semi-final game. Kadri did not elaborate on the specifics of what caused his refusal, but did absolve Niederreiter of using an ethnic slur, saying, "Obviously, in big games like that, guys tend to lose their composure a bit, but I didn't take offence to anything he said. It was just that I felt like I didn't have to shake his hand." Kadri later had second thoughts about his refusal, saying, "I regret it a little bit."

He represented Switzerland at the 2024 IIHF World Championship and won a silver medal.

== Career statistics ==
=== Regular season and playoffs ===
| | | | Regular season | | | | | Playoffs |
| Season | Team | League | GP | G | A | Pts | PIM | GP | G | A | Pts | PIM |
|---|---|---|---|---|---|---|---|---|---|---|---|---|
| 2006–07 | HC Davos | SUI U17 | 32 | 43 | 19 | 62 | 38 | 10 | 5 | 6 | 11 | 16 |
| 2006–07 | HC Davos | SUI U20 | — | — | — | — | — | 1 | 0 | 0 | 0 | 4 |
| 2007–08 | HC Davos | SUI U17 | 32 | 39 | 26 | 65 | 62 | 5 | 6 | 3 | 9 | 4 |
| 2007–08 | HC Davos | SUI U20 | 8 | 7 | 3 | 10 | 6 | 3 | 0 | 1 | 1 | 8 |
| 2008–09 | HC Davos | SUI U17 | 14 | 19 | 13 | 32 | 8 | — | — | — | — | — |
| 2008–09 | HC Davos | SUI U20 | 30 | 20 | 14 | 34 | 44 | 8 | 5 | 6 | 11 | 12 |
| 2008–09 | HC Davos | NLA | — | — | — | — | — | 3 | 0 | 1 | 1 | 0 |
| 2009–10 | Portland Winterhawks | WHL | 65 | 36 | 24 | 60 | 68 | 13 | 8 | 8 | 16 | 16 |
| 2010–11 | New York Islanders | NHL | 9 | 1 | 1 | 2 | 8 | — | — | — | — | — |
| 2010–11 | Portland Winterhawks | WHL | 55 | 41 | 29 | 70 | 68 | 21 | 9 | 18 | 27 | 30 |
| 2011–12 | New York Islanders | NHL | 55 | 1 | 0 | 1 | 12 | — | — | — | — | — |
| 2011–12 | Bridgeport Sound Tigers | AHL | 6 | 3 | 1 | 4 | 4 | — | — | — | — | — |
| 2012–13 | Bridgeport Sound Tigers | AHL | 74 | 28 | 22 | 50 | 38 | — | — | — | — | — |
| 2013–14 | Minnesota Wild | NHL | 81 | 14 | 22 | 36 | 44 | 13 | 3 | 3 | 6 | 8 |
| 2014–15 | Minnesota Wild | NHL | 80 | 24 | 13 | 37 | 28 | 10 | 4 | 1 | 5 | 10 |
| 2015–16 | Minnesota Wild | NHL | 82 | 20 | 23 | 43 | 36 | 6 | 1 | 5 | 6 | 4 |
| 2016–17 | Minnesota Wild | NHL | 82 | 25 | 32 | 57 | 53 | 5 | 0 | 1 | 1 | 2 |
| 2017–18 | Minnesota Wild | NHL | 63 | 18 | 14 | 32 | 36 | 5 | 0 | 0 | 0 | 0 |
| 2018–19 | Minnesota Wild | NHL | 46 | 9 | 14 | 23 | 10 | — | — | — | — | — |
| 2018–19 | Carolina Hurricanes | NHL | 36 | 14 | 16 | 30 | 20 | 15 | 1 | 3 | 4 | 12 |
| 2019–20 | Carolina Hurricanes | NHL | 67 | 11 | 18 | 29 | 42 | 7 | 1 | 1 | 2 | 2 |
| 2020–21 | Carolina Hurricanes | NHL | 56 | 20 | 14 | 34 | 29 | 7 | 1 | 0 | 1 | 8 |
| 2021–22 | Carolina Hurricanes | NHL | 75 | 24 | 20 | 44 | 34 | 14 | 4 | 1 | 5 | 10 |
| 2022–23 | Nashville Predators | NHL | 56 | 18 | 10 | 28 | 16 | — | — | — | — | — |
| 2022–23 | Winnipeg Jets | NHL | 22 | 6 | 7 | 13 | 6 | 5 | 1 | 3 | 4 | 2 |
| 2023–24 | Winnipeg Jets | NHL | 77 | 18 | 16 | 34 | 34 | 5 | 0 | 2 | 2 | 4 |
| 2024–25 | Winnipeg Jets | NHL | 82 | 17 | 20 | 37 | 24 | 13 | 4 | 2 | 6 | 10 |
| 2025–26 | Winnipeg Jets | NHL | 61 | 8 | 11 | 19 | 18 | — | — | — | — | — |
| NHL totals | | | 1,030 | 248 | 251 | 499 | 450 | 105 | 20 | 22 | 42 | 72 |

=== International ===
| Year | Team | Event | Result | GP | G | A | Pts | PIM |
|---|---|---|---|---|---|---|---|---|
| 2008 | Switzerland | U18 | 8th | 6 | 1 | 1 | 2 | 2 |
| 2009 | Switzerland | U18 | 8th | 6 | 3 | 3 | 6 | 16 |
| 2010 | Switzerland | WJC | 4th | 7 | 6 | 4 | 10 | 10 |
| 2010 | Switzerland | WC | 5th | 4 | 0 | 0 | 0 | 4 |
| 2011 | Switzerland | WJC | 5th | 6 | 2 | 2 | 4 | 12 |
| 2012 | Switzerland | WC | 11th | 6 | 0 | 0 | 0 | 2 |
| 2013 | Switzerland | WC | 2nd place, silver medalist(s) | 10 | 5 | 3 | 8 | 2 |
| 2014 | Switzerland | OG | 9th | 4 | 0 | 0 | 0 | 2 |
| 2016 | Switzerland | WC | 11th | 7 | 3 | 3 | 6 | 2 |
| 2016 | Team Europe | WCH | 2nd | 6 | 0 | 1 | 1 | 2 |
| 2018 | Switzerland | WC | 2nd place, silver medalist(s) | 10 | 4 | 5 | 9 | 10 |
| 2019 | Switzerland | WC | 8th | 2 | 1 | 1 | 2 | 0 |
| 2023 | Switzerland | WC | 5th | 7 | 4 | 1 | 5 | 2 |
| 2024 | Switzerland | WC | 2nd place, silver medalist(s) | 10 | 3 | 4 | 7 | 2 |
| 2025 | Switzerland | WC | 2nd place, silver medalist(s) | 4 | 2 | 3 | 5 | 0 |
| 2026 | Switzerland | OG | 5th | 5 | 1 | 0 | 1 | 2 |
| 2026 | Switzerland | WC | 2nd place, silver medalist(s) | 10 | 2 | 3 | 5 | 4 |
| Junior totals | | | | 25 | 12 | 10 | 22 | 40 |
| Senior totals | | | | 85 | 25 | 24 | 49 | 34 |

== Awards and honours ==
| Award | Year |
WHL
| WHL West Second All-Star Team | 2010 |
AHL
| AHL All-Star Game | 2013 |
International
| WJC All-Star Team | 2010 |

Awards and achievements
| Preceded by Calvin de Haan | New York Islanders first round pick 2010 | Succeeded by Brock Nelson |
