= Brandon Convery =

Canadian ice hockey player (born 1974)

- Born: February 4, 1974 (age 52) Kingston, Ontario, Canada
- Height: 6 ft 0 in (183 cm)
- Weight: 180 lb (82 kg; 12 st 12 lb)
- Position: Centre
- Shot: Right
- Played for: Toronto Maple Leafs; Vancouver Canucks; Los Angeles Kings; Kloten Flyers; Linköpings HC; HC Lugano; EHC Basel
- National team: Canada
- NHL draft: 8th overall, 1992; Toronto Maple Leafs
- Playing career: 1992–2004

Brandon William Convery (born February 4, 1974) is a Canadian former professional ice hockey player who played briefly in the NHL with the Toronto Maple Leafs, Vancouver Canucks, and Los Angeles Kings. He played center and shot right-handed.

== Playing career ==
Convery began his career with the Sudbury Wolves of the OHL. For the 1991–1992 season Convery scored 40 goals in 44 games. His stellar play caught the eye of NHL scouts and he was drafted in the 1st round, 8th overall by the Toronto Maple Leafs in the 1992 NHL entry draft. After being drafted Convery returned to the OHL for the majority of the 1992–1993 season and also made his pro debut, appearing in 3 games with the St. John's Maple Leafs of the AHL.

Following another full season in the OHL, Convery played the 1994–95 season with St. John's, scoring 71 points in 76 games. The following season Convery made his NHL debut with the Toronto Maple Leafs, appearing in 11 games and scoring 7 points. The 1996–1997 season saw Convery play 39 games with the Maple Leafs, a career high. He played the majority of the 1997–1998 season with St. John's before being traded to the Vancouver Canucks, appearing in 7 games. The following season Convery spent most of the year in the minors but played in 12 games with the Canucks. He was then placed on waivers and picked up by the Los Angeles Kings, playing in 3 games with the Kings. This would prove to be the last time Convery would play in the NHL. Convery then played for 4 years in Switzerland and 1 year in Sweden before retiring in 2004.

== Career statistics ==
Brandon Convery
Medal record

Men's ice hockey

Representing Canada

World Championships
Bronze medal – third place	1995 Sweden	

=== Regular season and playoffs ===
			Regular season					Playoffs
Season	Team	League	GP	G	A	Pts	PIM	GP	G	A	Pts	PIM
1988–89	Kingston Voyageurs	MetJHL	13	0	3	3	14	—	—	—	—	—
1989–90	Kingston Voyageurs	MetJHL	42	13	25	38	4	—	—	—	—	—
1990–91	Sudbury Wolves	OHL	56	26	22	48	18	5	1	1	2	2
1991–92	Sudbury Wolves	OHL	44	40	27	67	44	5	3	2	5	4
1992–93	Sudbury Wolves	OHL	7	7	9	16	6	—	—	—	—	—
1992–93	Niagara Falls Thunder	OHL	51	38	39	77	24	4	1	3	4	4
1992–93	St. John's Maple Leafs	AHL	3	0	0	0	0	5	0	1	1	0
1993–94	Niagara Falls Thunder	OHL	29	24	29	53	30	—	—	—	—	—
1993–94	Belleville Bulls	OHL	23	16	19	35	22	12	4	10	14	13
1993–94	St. John's Maple Leafs	AHL	—	—	—	—	—	1	0	0	0	0
1994–95	St. John's Maple Leafs	AHL	76	34	37	71	43	5	2	2	4	4
1995–96	Toronto Maple Leafs	NHL	11	5	2	7	4	5	0	0	0	2
1995–96	St. John's Maple Leafs	AHL	57	22	23	45	28	—	—	—	—	—
1996–97	Toronto Maple Leafs	NHL	39	2	8	10	20	—	—	—	—	—
1996–97	St. John's Maple Leafs	AHL	25	14	14	28	15	—	—	—	—	—
1997–98	Vancouver Canucks	NHL	7	0	2	2	0	—	—	—	—	—
1997–98	St. John's Maple Leafs	AHL	49	27	36	63	35	—	—	—	—	—
1997–98	Syracuse Crunch	AHL	2	1	2	3	5	—	—	—	—	—
1998–99	Vancouver Canucks	NHL	12	2	7	9	8	—	—	—	—	—
1998–99	Los Angeles Kings	NHL	3	0	0	0	4	—	—	—	—	—
1998–99	Springfield Falcons	AHL	31	9	14	23	45	—	—	—	—	—
1998–99	Long Beach Ice Dogs	IHL	14	3	7	10	8	—	—	—	—	—
2000–01	Kloten Flyers	NLA	31	11	10	21	32	9	4	4	8	29
2001–02	Linköping HC	SEL	31	13	11	24	10	—	—	—	—	—
2002–03	HC Lugano	NLA	18	4	7	11	43	16	5	14	19	16
2002–03	HC Ajoie	NLB	1	0	0	0	0	—	—	—	—	—
2003–04	EHC Basel	NLA	32	6	15	21	55	—	—	—	—	—
2003–04	Kloten Flyers	NLA	1	0	0	0	0	—	—	—	—	—
AHL totals			243	107	126	233	171	11	2	3	5	4
NHL totals			72	9	19	28	36	5	0	0	0	2

=== International ===
Year	Team	Event	GP	G	A	Pts	PIM
1994	Canada	WJC	7	1	0	1	2
1995	Canada	WC	8	0	1	1	0
Junior totals			7	1	0	1	2
Senior totals			8	0	1	1	0

Preceded by Drake Berehowsky	Toronto Maple Leafs first-round draft pick 1992	Succeeded by Grant Marshall
