= Jeff Ware (ice hockey) =

Canadian ice hockey player

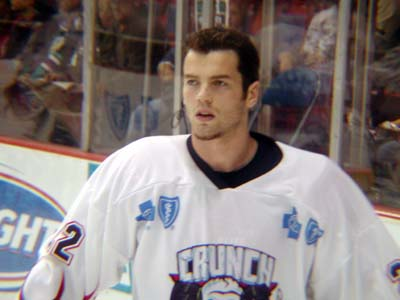
- Ware with the Syracuse Crunch during the 2001–02 season
- Born: May 19, 1977 (age 48) Toronto, Ontario, Canada
- Height: 6 ft 4 in (193 cm)
- Weight: 220 lb (100 kg; 15 st 10 lb)
- Position: Defence
- Shot: Left
- Played for: NHL; Toronto Maple Leafs; Florida Panthers; AHL; St. John's Maple Leafs; Beast of New Haven; Louisville Panthers; Syracuse Crunch
- NHL draft: 15th overall, 1995; Toronto Maple Leafs
- Playing career: 1996–2002

Jeff Ware (born May 19, 1977) is a Canadian former National Hockey League (NHL) defenceman who played for the Toronto Maple Leafs and the Florida Panthers. He was selected by the Toronto Maple Leafs in the first round (15th overall) of the 1995 NHL entry draft.

== Hockey career ==
As a youth, Ware played in the 1991 Quebec International Pee-Wee Hockey Tournament with the Toronto Marlboros minor ice hockey, which the team won. Ware played major junior hockey for the Oshawa Generals of the Ontario Hockey League, where he captained the team for the 1995–96 season. He won the league championship in 1997. During his junior career, he won a gold medal with Team Canada's Under-18 team in 1994 in Mexico City. He went on to win another gold medal with Team Canada at the 1997 World Juniors hockey tournament in Geneva, Switzerland.

The Toronto Maple Leafs drafted Ware in the first round, 15th overall, at the 1995 NHL entry draft. He played in 16 games with the Maple Leafs, never scoring a point. Ware requested a trade from Toronto in 1998, due to mismanagement of the Maple Leafs AHL affiliate, which was initially denied. Eventually, on February 15, 1999, Ware was traded to the Florida Panthers for forward David Nemirovsky. On July 1, 2000, Florida declined to offer Ware a qualifying offer, making him an unrestricted free agent. The Panthers exposed him for selection in the 2000 NHL Expansion Draft, but he was not taken by either of the expansion teams. He played 21 total career games in the NHL, tallying one assist.

Ware would subsequently play parts of two seasons with the Syracuse Crunch from 2000 to 2002, before retiring from hockey on January 28, 2002 following five knee surgeries.

== Career statistics ==
=== Regular season and playoffs ===
			Regular season					Playoffs
Season	Team	League	GP	G	A	Pts	PIM	GP	G	A	Pts	PIM
1993–94	Wexford Raiders	MetJHL	45	1	9	10	75	—	—	—	—	—
1994–95	Oshawa Generals	OHL	55	2	11	13	86	7	1	1	2	6
1995–96	Oshawa Generals	OHL	62	4	19	23	128	5	0	1	1	8
1995–96	St. John's Maple Leafs	AHL	4	0	0	0	4	4	0	0	0	2
1996–97	Oshawa Generals	OHL	24	1	10	11	38	13	0	3	3	34
1996–97	Toronto Maple Leafs	NHL	13	0	0	0	6	—	—	—	—	—
1997–98	St. John's Maple Leafs	AHL	67	0	3	3	182	4	0	0	0	4
1997–98	Toronto Maple Leafs	NHL	2	0	0	0	0	—	—	—	—	—
1998–99	St. John's Maple Leafs	AHL	55	1	4	5	130	—	—	—	—	—
1998–99	Beast of New Haven	AHL	20	0	1	1	26	—	—	—	—	—
1998–99	Florida Panthers	NHL	6	0	1	1	6	—	—	—	—	—
1999–2000	Louisville Panthers	AHL	51	0	10	10	128	4	0	0	0	4
2000–01	Syracuse Crunch	AHL	71	0	4	4	174	5	0	0	0	16
2001–02	Syracuse Crunch	AHL	23	0	0	0	58	—	—	—	—	—
AHL totals			291	1	22	23	702	17	0	0	0	26
NHL totals			21	0	1	1	12	—	—	—	—	—

=== International ===
Year	Team	Event	GP	G	A	Pts	PIM
1997	Canada	WJC	7	0	0	0	6

Preceded by Éric Fichaud	Toronto Maple Leafs first-round draft pick 1995	Succeeded by Nik Antropov
