= Nik Antropov =

Kazakh-Canadian ice hockey centre (born 1980)

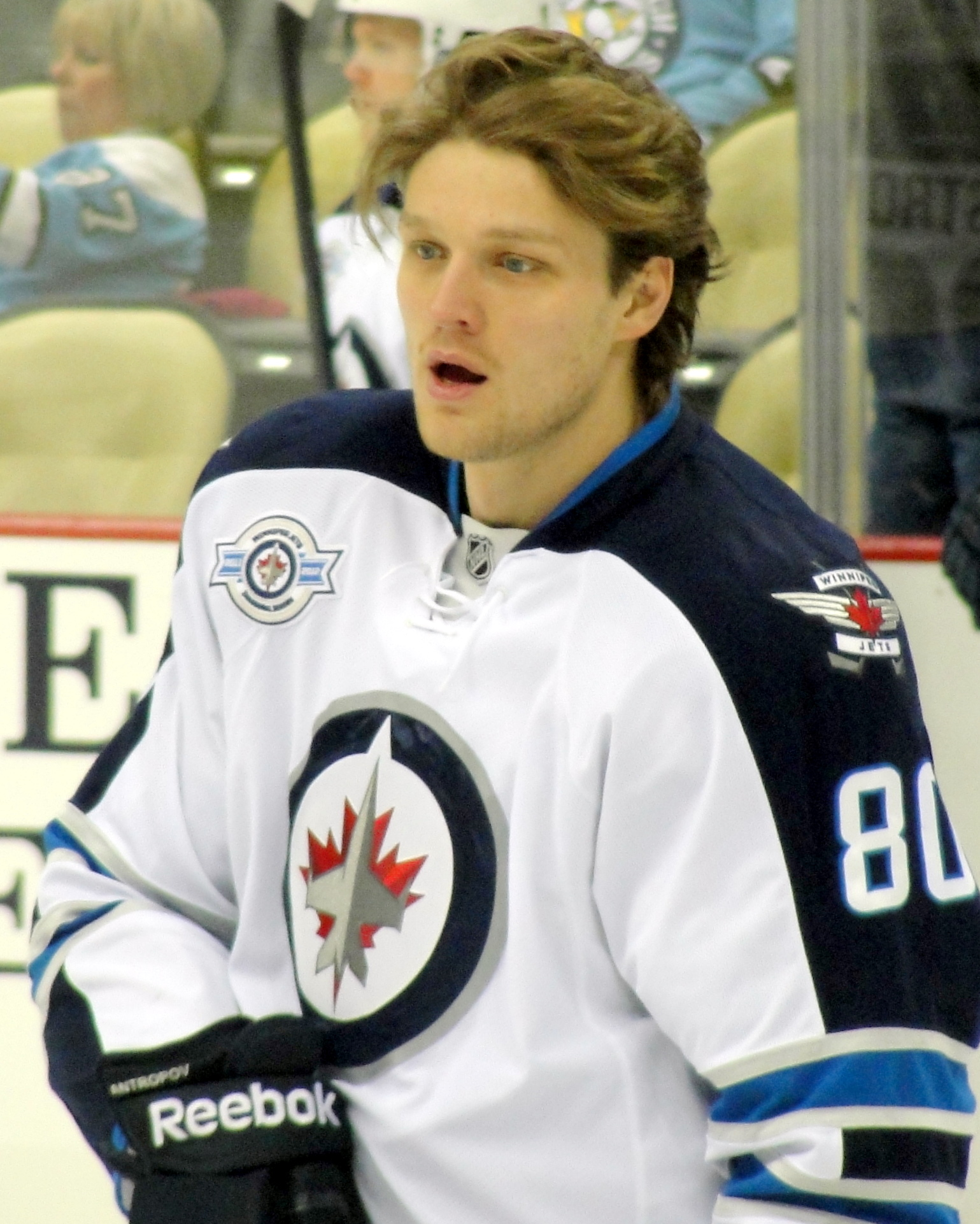
- Antropov with the Winnipeg Jets in 2012
- Born: February 18, 1980 (age 46) Ust-Kamenogorsk, Kazakh SSR, Soviet Union
- Height: 6 ft 6 in (198 cm)
- Weight: 245 lb (111 kg; 17 st 7 lb)
- Position: Centre
- Shot: Left
- Played for: Dynamo Moscow; Toronto Maple Leafs; Ak Bars Kazan; Lokomotiv Yaroslavl; New York Rangers; Atlanta Thrashers; Winnipeg Jets; Barys Astana
- National team: Kazakhstan
- NHL draft: 10th overall, 1998; Toronto Maple Leafs
- Playing career: 1996–2015

Nikolai Alexandrovich Antropov (Russian: Николай Александрович Антропов; born February 18, 1980) is a Kazakh-Canadian former professional ice hockey centre who played in the National Hockey League (NHL) with the Toronto Maple Leafs, New York Rangers, Atlanta Thrashers and Winnipeg Jets. He received Canadian citizenship in May 2007. Internationally Antropov played for Kazakhstan at several junior and senior tournaments, including the 2006 Winter Olympics.

== Playing career ==
Antropov was expected to be drafted early in the second round, but following a dominant season with Torpedo Ust-Kamenogorsk in the second-tier of the Russian Superleague (RSL), including an international match against Iceland, in which he scored 11 goals and 26 points, he was drafted tenth overall by the Toronto Maple Leafs in the 1998 NHL entry draft. Before going overseas to play hockey in North America, Antropov also played in the RSL with Dynamo Moscow.

When Owen Nolan joined the Maple Leafs in March 2003, Antropov changed his number from #11 (Nolan's number for the San Jose Sharks) to #80, the year of his birth. In 2003–04, Maple Leafs head coach Pat Quinn placed Antropov alongside Joe Nieuwendyk and Alexei Ponikarovsky dubbed the "Skyline" due to the players' height.

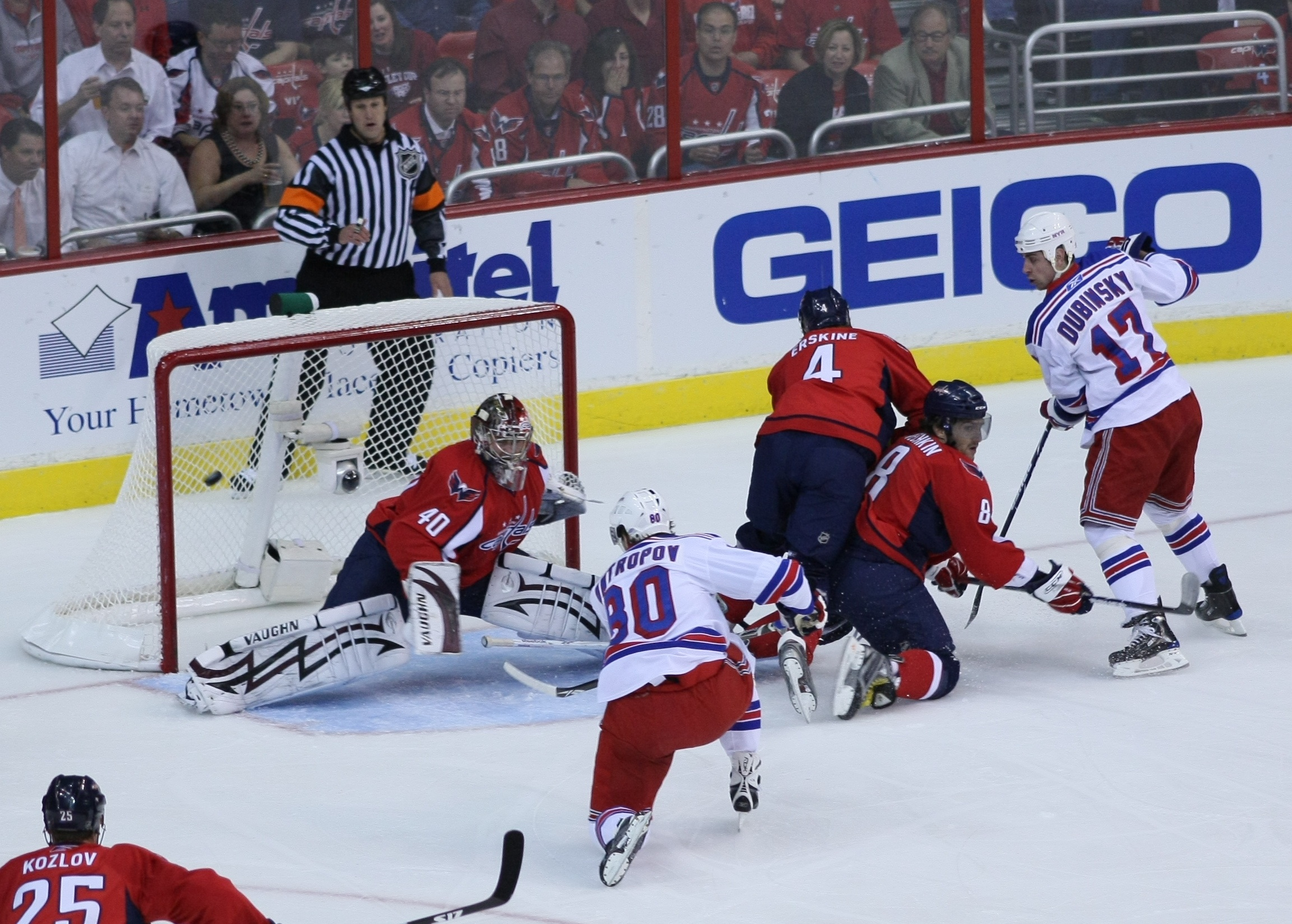
Antropov scores in the 2009 playoffs while a member of the New York Rangers.

During the 2004–05 NHL lockout, Antropov returned to the RSL and played 36 games split between Ak Bars Kazan and Lokomotiv Yaroslavl. However, injuries felled the power forward, and he missed significant time during the 2005–06 season. Antropov managed to produce 12 goals and 19 assists for 31 points in 57 games.

Upon Antropov's return from injury, he added 15 points in the final 10 regular season games of the 2005–06 season. He finished third on the team in even strength scoring and also led the Leafs in plus-minus with a +13 rating. In 2006–07, Antropov typically played alongside team captain Mats Sundin and Ponikarovsky on Toronto's top line. On June 6, 2007, the Maple Leafs announced they had signed Antropov to a two-year contract extension. During a game against the New York Rangers on December 6, 2007, Antropov scored his second career hat-trick and was named the game's first star. In December 2007, a campaign was launched to encourage fans to vote Antropov as a write-in candidate for the 2007 NHL All-Star Game held in Atlanta.

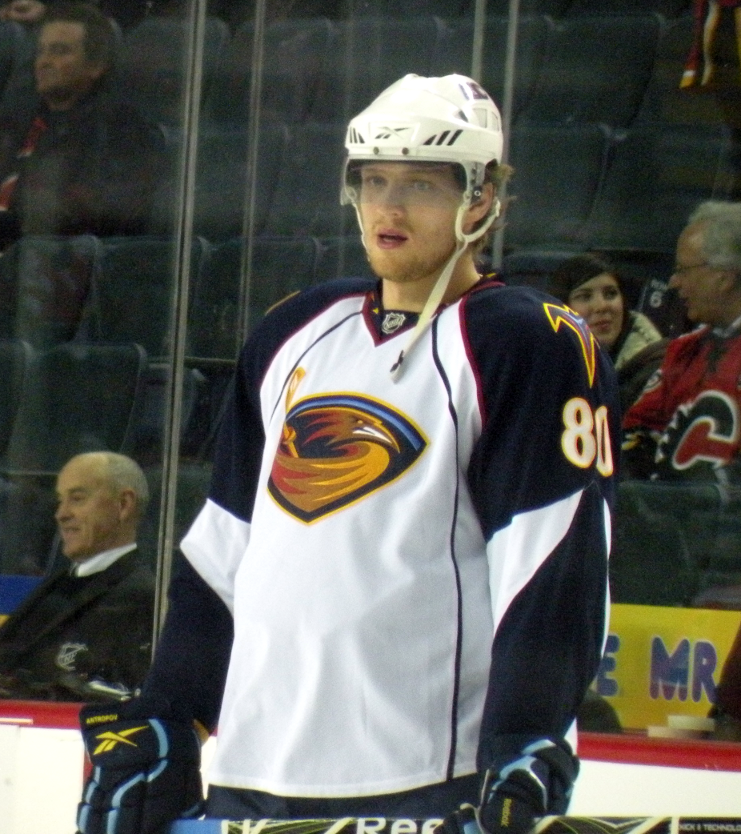
Antropov with the Thrashers in 2009.

On February 9, 2008, Antropov set a new career-high in goals with 19 when he scored in overtime to give the Maple Leafs a 3–2 win, tipping in an Anton Strålman slapshot; he finished the season with 26 goals. On March 4, 2009, Antropov was traded to the New York Rangers in exchange for a second-round draft pick and conditional draft pick.

On July 2, 2009, Antropov signed a four-year, $16.25 million deal with the Atlanta Thrashers as a free agent. He was expected to make $3.5 million the first year, $3.75 million the second, $4.25 million the third and $4.75 million for the final year of the deal for an average cap hit of $4.0625 million per year. Antropov's first year with the Thrashers was his most successful, scoring 24 goals and 43 assists. Following the team's relocation to Winnipeg in the summer of 2011, Antropov had scored the first goal of the new Winnipeg Jets on October 9, 2011, against the Montreal Canadiens.

On August 8, 2013, Antropov signed a two-year contract with Barys Astana of the Kontinental Hockey League (KHL), where he played during 2012–13 NHL lockout. At the conclusion of his two-year tenure with Barys, Antropov retired from professional hockey and returned to Canada.

== International play ==
Medal record

Representing Kazakhstan

Ice hockey

Asian Games
Gold medal – first place	1999 Gangwon	

Internationally, Antropov represented Kazakhstan in the 1998 IIHF World Championship, the 1999 World Junior Ice Hockey Championships (scoring eight points in six games), 1999 Asian Winter Games (gold) and in the 2006 Winter Olympics, where he scored one goal. Antropov captained the Kazakhstani squad on both occasions. He and Colorado Avalanche goaltender Vitali Kolesnik were the lone NHL players on the team.

== Personal life ==
During his tenure with the Leafs, Antropov became a Canadian citizen. He received Canadian citizenship in May 2007.

Antropov and his wife have three children. Antropov's oldest son, Danil was a forward for the Saginaw Spirit of the Ontario Hockey League during the 2019–20 season.

== Career statistics ==
=== Regular season and playoffs ===
			Regular season					Playoffs
Season	Team	League	GP	G	A	Pts	PIM	GP	G	A	Pts	PIM
1996–97	Torpedo Ust–Kamenogorsk	RUS.2	8	2	1	3	6	—	—	—	—	—
1997–98	Torpedo Ust–Kamenogorsk	RUS.2	42	15	24	39	62	—	—	—	—	—
1997–98	Torpedo–2 Ust–Kamenogorsk	RUS.3	4	2	2	4	6	—	—	—	—	—
1998–99	Dynamo Moscow	RSL	30	5	9	14	30	11	0	1	1	4
1999–2000	Toronto Maple Leafs	NHL	66	12	18	30	41	3	0	0	0	4
1999–2000	St. John's Maple Leafs	AHL	2	0	0	0	4	—	—	—	—	—
2000–01	Toronto Maple Leafs	NHL	52	6	11	17	30	9	2	1	3	12
2001–02	Toronto Maple Leafs	NHL	11	1	1	2	4	—	—	—	—	—
2001–02	St. John's Maple Leafs	AHL	34	11	24	35	47	—	—	—	—	—
2002–03	Toronto Maple Leafs	NHL	72	16	29	45	124	3	0	0	0	0
2003–04	Toronto Maple Leafs	NHL	62	13	18	31	62	13	0	2	2	18
2004–05	Ak Bars Kazan	RSL	10	2	3	5	6	—	—	—	—	—
2004–05	Lokomotiv Yaroslavl	RSL	26	4	15	19	44	9	3	4	7	18
2005–06	Toronto Maple Leafs	NHL	57	12	19	31	56	—	—	—	—	—
2006–07	Toronto Maple Leafs	NHL	54	18	15	33	44	—	—	—	—	—
2007–08	Toronto Maple Leafs	NHL	72	26	30	56	92	—	—	—	—	—
2008–09	Toronto Maple Leafs	NHL	63	21	25	46	24	—	—	—	—	—
2008–09	New York Rangers	NHL	18	7	6	13	6	7	2	1	3	6
2009–10	Atlanta Thrashers	NHL	76	24	43	67	44	—	—	—	—	—
2010–11	Atlanta Thrashers	NHL	76	16	25	41	42	—	—	—	—	—
2011–12	Winnipeg Jets	NHL	69	15	20	35	42	—	—	—	—	—
2012–13	Barys Astana	KHL	26	3	14	17	39	—	—	—	—	—
2012–13	Winnipeg Jets	NHL	40	6	12	18	16	—	—	—	—	—
2013–14	Barys Astana	KHL	36	8	18	26	62	10	1	3	4	14
2014–15	Barys Astana	KHL	39	7	14	21	64	7	0	1	1	2
NHL totals			788	193	272	465	627	35	4	4	8	40
KHL totals			101	18	46	64	165	17	1	4	5	16

=== International ===
Year	Team	Event	GP	G	A	Pts	PIM
1997	Kazakhstan	AJC	3	1	1	2	4
1997	Kazakhstan	WJC B	6	1	0	1	4
1998	Kazakhstan	WJC	7	0	6	6	8
1998	Kazakhstan	EJC D	5	23	31	54	6
1998	Kazakhstan	WC	3	0	1	1	4
1999	Kazakhstan	WJC	6	3	5	8	14
2006	Kazakhstan	OG	5	1	0	1	4
2014	Kazakhstan	WC	6	1	4	5	29
Junior totals			27	28	43	71	46
Senior totals			14	2	5	7	37

Awards and achievements
Preceded by Jeff Ware	Toronto Maple Leafs first-round draft pick 1998	Succeeded by Luca Cereda
