= List of Toronto Maple Leafs draft picks =

This is a complete list of ice hockey players who were drafted in the National Hockey League Entry Draft by the Toronto Maple Leafs franchise. It includes every player who was drafted, regardless of whether they played for the team.

The NHL entry draft is held each June, allowing teams to select players who have turned 18 years old by September 15 in the year the draft is held. The draft order is determined by the previous season's order of finish, with non-playoff teams drafting first, followed by the teams that made the playoffs, with the specific order determined by the number of points earned by each team. The NHL holds a weighted lottery for the 14 non-playoff teams, allowing the winner to move up a maximum of four positions in the entry draft. The team with the fewest points has the best chance of winning the lottery, with each successive team given a lower chance of moving up in the draft. Since 2016, the first three selections have been allocated by the lottery.

Toronto has participated in every NHL draft, with the franchise's first draft pick being Walt McKechnie, taken 6th overall in the 1963 NHL Amateur Draft. Toronto has selected first overall three times, in 1985, in 2016, and most recently in 2026. Throughout their history, the Maple Leafs have drafted multiple All-Stars and many players who have gone on to have successful careers, including two inducted into the Hockey Hall of Fame: Darryl Sittler and Lanny McDonald.

== Key ==
Played at least one game with the Maple Leafs
Spent entire NHL career with the Maple Leafs

General terms and abbreviations
Term or abbreviation	Definition
Draft	The year that the player was selected
Round	The round of the draft in which the player was selected
Pick	The overall position in the draft at which the player was selected
S	Supplemental draft selection

Position abbreviations
Abbreviation	Definition
G	Goaltender
D	Defence
LW	Left wing
C	Centre
RW	Right wing
F	Forward

Abbreviations for statistical columns
Abbreviation	Definition
Pos	Position
GP	Games played
G	Goals
A	Assists
Pts	Points
PIM	Penalties in minutes
W	Wins
L	Losses
T	Ties
OT	Overtime/shootout losses
GAA	Goals against average
—	Does not apply

== Draft picks ==
Statistics are complete as of the 2025–26 NHL season and show each player's career regular season totals in the NHL. Wins, losses, ties, overtime losses and goals against average apply to goaltenders and are used only for players at that position.

Draft	Round	Pick	Player	Nationality	Pos	GP	G	A	Pts	PIM	W	L	T	OT	GAA
1963	1	6	Walt McKechnie	Canada	C	955	214	392	606	469	—	—	—	—	—
1963	2	12	Neil Clairmont	Canada	C	—	—	—	—	—	—	—	—	—	—
1963	3	17	Jim McKenny	Canada	D	604	82	247	329	294	—	—	—	—	—
1963	4	21	Gerry Meehan	Canada	LW	670	180	243	423	111	—	—	—	—	—
1964	1	5	Tom Martin	Canada	RW	3	1	0	1	0	—	—	—	—	—
1964	2	11	David Cotey	Canada	F	—	—	—	—	—	—	—	—	—	—
1964	3	17	Mike Pelyk	Canada	D	441	26	88	114	566	—	—	—	—	—
1964	4	23	Jim Dorey	Canada	D	232	25	74	99	553	—	—	—	—	—
1966	1	4	John Wright	Canada	C	127	16	36	52	67	—	—	—	—	—
1966	2	10	Cam Crosby	Canada	LW	—	—	—	—	—	—	—	—	—	—
1966	3	16	Rick Ley	Canada	D	310	12	72	84	392	—	—	—	—	—
1966	4	22	Dale MacLeish	Canada	C	—	—	—	—	—	—	—	—	—	—
1967	2	16	J. Bob Kelly	Canada	LW	425	87	109	196	687	—	—	—	—	—
1968	1	10	Brad Selwood	Canada	D	163	7	40	47	153	—	—	—	—	—
1969	1	9	Ernie Moser	Canada	RW	—	—	—	—	—	—	—	—	—	—
1969	2	20	Doug Brindley	Canada	C	3	0	0	0	0	—	—	—	—	—
1969	3	31	Larry McIntyre	Canada	D	41	0	3	3	26	—	—	—	—	—
1969	4	43	Frank Hughes	Canada	RW	5	0	0	0	0	—	—	—	—	—
1968	5	55	Brian Spencer	Canada	LW	553	80	143	223	634	—	—	—	—	—
1969	6	67	Bob Neufeld	Canada	D	—	—	—	—	—	—	—	—	—	—
1970	1	8	Darryl Sittler	Canada	C	1096	484	637	1121	948	—	—	—	—	—
1970	2	22	Errol Thompson	Canada	LW	599	208	185	393	184	—	—	—	—	—
1970	3	36	Gerry O'Flaherty	United States	RW	438	99	95	194	168	—	—	—	—	—
1970	4	50	Bob Gryp	Canada	LW	74	11	13	24	33	—	—	—	—	—
1970	5	64	Luc Simard	Canada	LW	—	—	—	—	—	—	—	—	—	—
1970	6	78	Cal Booth	Canada	LW	—	—	—	—	—	—	—	—	—	—
1970	7	91	Paul Larose	Canada	F	—	—	—	—	—	—	—	—	—	—
1970	8	103	Ron Low	Canada	G	382	0	8	8	45	102	203	38	—	4.28
1971	2	22	Rick Kehoe	Canada	F	906	371	396	767	120	—	—	—	—	—
1971	2	23	Dave Fortier	Canada	D	205	8	21	29	335	—	—	—	—	—
1971	3	30	Ralph Hopiavuori	Canada	D	—	—	—	—	—	—	—	—	—	—
1971	3	37	Gavin Kirk	Canada	C	—	—	—	—	—	—	—	—	—	—
1971	4	51	Rick Cunningham	Canada	D	—	—	—	—	—	—	—	—	—	—
1971	5	65	Bob Sykes	Canada	LW	2	0	0	0	0	—	—	—	—	—
1971	6	79	Michel Ruest	Canada	D	—	—	—	—	—	—	—	—	—	—
1971	7	93	Dale Smedsmo	United States	LW	4	0	0	0	0	—	—	—	—	—
1971	7	98	Steve Johnson	Canada	LW	—	—	—	—	—	—	—	—	—	—
1971	8	107	Bob Burns	Canada	D	—	—	—	—	—	—	—	—	—	—
1972	1	11	George Ferguson	Canada	F	797	160	238	398	431	—	—	—	—	—
1972	2	27	Randy Osburn	Canada	F	27	0	2	2	0	—	—	—	—	—
1972	3	43	Denis Deslauriers	Canada	D	—	—	—	—	—	—	—	—	—	—
1972	4	59	Brian Bowles	Canada	D	—	—	—	—	—	—	—	—	—	—
1972	5	75	Michel Plante	Canada	F	—	—	—	—	—	—	—	—	—	—
1972	6	91	Dave Shardlow	Canada	F	—	—	—	—	—	—	—	—	—	—
1972	7	107	Monte Miron	Canada	D	—	—	—	—	—	—	—	—	—	—
1972	8	123	Peter Williams	Canada	F	—	—	—	—	—	—	—	—	—	—
1972	9	139	Pat Boutette	Canada	C	756	171	282	453	1354	—	—	—	—	—
1972	9	143	Gary Schofield	United States	D	—	—	—	—	—	—	—	—	—	—
1973	1	4	Lanny McDonald	Canada	RW	1111	500	506	1006	899	—	—	—	—	—
1973	1	10	Bob Neely	Canada	D	283	39	59	98	266	—	—	—	—	—
1973	1	15	Ian Turnbull	Canada	D	628	123	317	440	736	—	—	—	—	—
1973	4	52	Frank Rochon	Canada	LW	—	—	—	—	—	—	—	—	—	—
1973	5	68	Gord Titcomb	Canada	LW	—	—	—	—	—	—	—	—	—	—
1973	6	84	Doug Marit	Canada	D	—	—	—	—	—	—	—	—	—	—
1973	7	100	Dan Follett	Canada	G	—	—	—	—	—	—	—	—	—	—
1973	8	116	Les Burgess	Canada	C	—	—	—	—	—	—	—	—	—	—
1973	9	132	Dave Pay	Canada	C	—	—	—	—	—	—	—	—	—	—
1973	10	144	Lee Palmer	Canada	D	—	—	—	—	—	—	—	—	—	—
1973	10	147	Bob Peace	Canada	C	—	—	—	—	—	—	—	—	—	—
1973	11	159	Norm McLeod	Canada	LW	—	—	—	—	—	—	—	—	—	—
1974	1	13	Jack Valiquette	Canada	C	350	84	134	218	79	—	—	—	—	—
1974	2	31	Tiger Williams	Canada	F	962	241	272	513	3966	—	—	—	—	—
1974	3	49	Per-Arne Alexandersson	Sweden	F	—	—	—	—	—	—	—	—	—	—
1974	4	67	Peter Driscoll	Canada	LW	60	3	8	11	97	—	—	—	—	—
1974	5	85	Mike Palmateer	Canada	G	356	0	25	25	118	149	138	52	—	3.53
1974	6	103	Bill Hassard	Canada	C	—	—	—	—	—	—	—	—	—	—
1974	7	121	Kevin Devine	Canada	LW	2	0	1	1	8	—	—	—	—	—
1974	8	138	Kevin Kemp	Canada	D	3	0	0	0	4	—	—	—	—	—
1974	9	155	Dave Syvret	Canada	D	—	—	—	—	—	—	—	—	—	—
1974	10	170	Andy Stoesz	Canada	G	—	—	—	—	—	—	—	—	—	—
1974	11	185	Marty Feschuk	Canada	D	—	—	—	—	—	—	—	—	—	—
1975	1	6	Don Ashby	Canada	C	188	40	56	96	40	—	—	—	—	—
1975	2	24	Doug Jarvis	Canada	C	964	139	264	403	263	—	—	—	—	—
1975	3	42	Bruce Boudreau	Canada	C	141	28	42	70	46	—	—	—	—	—
1975	5	78	Ted Long	Canada	LW	—	—	—	—	—	—	—	—	—	—
1975	6	96	Kevin Campbell	Canada	D	—	—	—	—	—	—	—	—	—	—
1975	7	114	Mario Rouillard	Canada	RW	—	—	—	—	—	—	—	—	—	—
1975	8	132	Ron Wilson	United States	D	177	26	67	93	68	—	—	—	—	—
1975	9	149	Paul Evans	Canada	RW	11	1	1	2	21	—	—	—	—	—
1975	10	165	Jean Latendresse	Canada	D	—	—	—	—	—	—	—	—	—	—
1975	10	166	Paul Crowley	Canada	RW	—	—	—	—	—	—	—	—	—	—
1975	11	179	Dan D'Alvise	Canada	F	—	—	—	—	—	—	—	—	—	—
1975	11	180	Jack Laine	Canada	RW	—	—	—	—	—	—	—	—	—	—
1975	12	188	Ken Holland	Canada	G	4	0	0	0	0	0	2	1	—	4.95
1975	12	189	Robert Barnes	Canada	D	—	—	—	—	—	—	—	—	—	—
1975	12	191	Gary Burns	United States	F	11	2	2	4	18	—	—	—	—	—
1975	12	193	Jim Montgomery	Canada	C	—	—	—	—	—	—	—	—	—	—
1975	13	199	Rick Martin	Canada	RW	—	—	—	—	—	—	—	—	—	—
1976	2	30	Randy Carlyle	Canada	D	1055	148	499	647	1400	—	—	—	—	—
1976	3	48	Alain Belanger	Canada	RW	9	0	1	1	6	—	—	—	—	—
1976	3	52	Gary McFadyen	Canada	RW	—	—	—	—	—	—	—	—	—	—
1976	4	66	Tim Williams	Canada	D	—	—	—	—	—	—	—	—	—	—
1976	5	84	Greg Hotham	Canada	D	230	15	74	89	—	—	—	—	—	
1976	6	102	Dan Djakalovic	Canada	F	—	—	—	—	—	—	—	—	—	—
1976	7	116	Charlie Skjodt	Canada	C	—	—	—	—	—	—	—	—	—	—
1977	1	11	John Anderson	Canada	LW	814	282	349	631	263	—	—	—	—	—
1977	1	12	Trevor Johansen	Canada	D	286	11	46	57	282	—	—	—	—	—
1977	2	24	Bob Gladney	Canada	D	14	1	5	6	4	—	—	—	—	—
1977	2	29	Rocky Saganiuk	Canada	RW	259	57	65	122	201	—	—	—	—	—
1977	4	65	Dan Eastman	Canada	C	—	—	—	—	—	—	—	—	—	—
1977	5	83	John Wilson	Canada	LW	—	—	—	—	—	—	—	—	—	—
1977	6	101	Roy Sommer	United States	C	3	1	0	1	7	—	—	—	—	—
1977	7	119	Lynn Jorgenson	Canada	LW	—	—	—	—	—	—	—	—	—	—
1977	8	134	Kevin Howe	Canada	D	—	—	—	—	—	—	—	—	—	—
1977	9	149	Ray Robertson	Canada	D	—	—	—	—	—	—	—	—	—	—
1978	2	21	Joel Quenneville	Canada	D	803	54	136	190	705	—	—	—	—	—
1978	3	48	Mark Kirton	Canada	C	266	57	56	113	121	—	—	—	—	—
1978	4	65	Bob Parent	Canada	G	3	0	0	0	0	0	2	0	—	5.63
1978	5	81	Jordy Douglas	Canada	LW	268	76	62	138	160	—	—	—	—	—
1978	6	92	Mel Hewitt	Canada	LW	—	—	—	—	—	—	—	—	—	—
1978	6	98	Normand Lefebvre	Canada	RW	—	—	—	—	—	—	—	—	—	—
1978	7	115	John Scammell	Canada	D	—	—	—	—	—	—	—	—	—	—
1978	8	132	Kevin Reinhart	Canada	D	—	—	—	—	—	—	—	—	—	—
1978	9	149	Mike Waghorne	United States	D	—	—	—	—	—	—	—	—	—	—
1978	10	166	Laurie Cuvelier	Canada	D	—	—	—	—	—	—	—	—	—	—
1979	1	9	Laurie Boschman	Canada	LW	1009	229	348	577	2260	—	—	—	—	—
1979	3	51	Normand Aubin	Canada	F	69	18	13	31	30	—	—	—	—	—
1979	4	72	Vincent Tremblay	Canada	G	58	0	2	2	4	12	26	8	—	4.80
1979	5	93	Frank Nigro	Canada	C	68	8	18	26	39	—	—	—	—	—
1979	6	114	Bill McCreary	United States	LW	12	1	0	1	4	—	—	—	—	—
1980	2	25	Craig Muni	Canada	D	819	28	119	147	775	—	—	—	—	—
1980	2	26	Bob McGill	Canada	D	705	17	55	72	1766	—	—	—	—	—
1980	3	43	Fred Boimistruck	Canada	D	83	4	14	18	45	—	—	—	—	—
1980	4	74	Stewart Gavin	Canada	RW	768	130	155	285	584	—	—	—	—	—
1980	5	95	Hugh Larkin	United States	RW	—	—	—	—	—	—	—	—	—	—
1980	6	116	Ron Dennis	Canada	G	—	—	—	—	—	—	—	—	—	—
1980	7	137	Russ Adam	Canada	C	8	1	2	3	11	—	—	—	—	—
1980	8	158	Fred Perlini	Canada	C	8	2	3	5	0	—	—	—	—	—
1980	9	179	Darwin McCutcheon	Canada	D	1	0	0	0	2	—	—	—	—	—
1980	10	200	Paul Higgins	Canada	RW	25	0	0	0	152	—	—	—	—	—
1981	1	6	Jim Benning	Canada	D	610	52	191	243	461	—	—	—	—	—
1981	2	24	Gary Yaremchuk	Canada	C	34	1	4	5	28	—	—	—	—	—
1981	3	55	Ernie Godden	Canada	C	5	1	1	2	6	—	—	—	—	—
1981	5	90	Normand Lefrancois	Canada	F	—	—	—	—	—	—	—	—	—	—
1981	5	102	Barry Brigley	Canada	C	—	—	—	—	—	—	—	—	—	—
1981	7	132	Andrew Wright	Canada	D	—	—	—	—	—	—	—	—	—	—
1981	8	153	Richard Turmel	Canada	D	—	—	—	—	—	—	—	—	—	—
1981	9	174	Greg Barber	Canada	D	—	—	—	—	—	—	—	—	—	—
1981	10	195	Marc Magnan	Canada	LW	4	0	1	1	5	—	—	—	—	—
1982	1	3	Gary Nylund	Canada	D	608	32	139	171	1235	—	—	—	—	—
1982	2	24	Gary Leeman	Canada	LW	667	199	267	466	531	—	—	—	—	—
1982	2	25	Peter Ihnacak	Slovakia	F	417	102	165	267	175	—	—	—	—	—
1982	3	45	Ken Wregget	Canada	G	575	0	24	24	182	225	248	53	—	3.63
1982	4	73	Vladimir Ruzicka	Czech Republic	F	233	82	85	167	129	—	—	—	—	—
1982	5	87	Eduard Uvira	Czech Republic	D	—	—	—	—	—	—	—	—	—	—
1982	5	99	Sylvain Charland	Canada	LW	—	—	—	—	—	—	—	—	—	—
1982	6	108	Ron Dreger	Canada	LW	—	—	—	—	—	—	—	—	—	—
1982	6	115	Craig Kales	United States	RW	—	—	—	—	—	—	—	—	—	—
1982	7	129	Dominic Campedelli	United States	D	2	0	0	0	0	—	—	—	—	—
1982	7	139	Jeff Triano	Canada	D	—	—	—	—	—	—	—	—	—	—
1982	9	171	Miroslav Ihnacak	Slovakia	F	56	8	9	17	39	—	—	—	—	—
1982	10	192	Leigh Verstraete	Canada	RW	8	0	1	1	14	—	—	—	—	—
1982	11	213	Tim Loven	United States	D	—	—	—	—	—	—	—	—	—	—
1982	12	234	Jim Appleby	Canada	G	—	—	—	—	—	—	—	—	—	—
1983	1	7	Russ Courtnall	Canada	RW	1029	297	447	744	557	—	—	—	—	—
1983	2	28	Jeff Jackson	Canada	LW	263	38	48	86	313	—	—	—	—	—
1983	3	48	Allan Bester	Canada	G	219	0	8	8	32	73	99	17	—	4.01
1983	5	83	Dan Hodgson	Canada	C	114	29	45	74	64	—	—	—	—	—
1983	7	128	Cam Plante	Canada	D	2	0	0	0	0	—	—	—	—	—
1983	8	148	Paul Bifano	Canada	RW	—	—	—	—	—	—	—	—	—	—
1983	9	168	Cliff Abrecht	Canada	D	—	—	—	—	—	—	—	—	—	—
1983	10	184	Greg Rolston	United States	F	—	—	—	—	—	—	—	—	—	—
1983	10	188	Brian Ross	Canada	D	—	—	—	—	—	—	—	—	—	—
1983	11	208	Mike Tomlak	Canada	C	141	15	22	37	103	—	—	—	—	—
1983	12	228	Ron Choules	Canada	LW	—	—	—	—	—	—	—	—	—	—
1984	1	4	Al Iafrate	United States	D	799	152	311	463	1301	—	—	—	—	—
1984	2	25	Todd Gill	Canada	D	1007	82	272	354	1214	—	—	—	—	—
1984	4	67	Jeff Reese	Canada	G	174	0	8	8	30	53	65	17	—	3.66
1984	5	88	Jack Capuano	United States	D	6	0	0	0	0	—	—	—	—	—
1984	6	109	Fabian Joseph	Canada	C	—	—	—	—	—	—	—	—	—	—
1984	7	130	Joe MacInnis	United States	F	—	—	—	—	—	—	—	—	—	—
1984	8	151	Derek Laxdal	Canada	RW	67	12	7	19	88	—	—	—	—	—
1984	9	172	Dan Turner	Canada	F	—	—	—	—	—	—	—	—	—	—
1984	10	192	David Buckley	United States	D	—	—	—	—	—	—	—	—	—	—
1984	11	213	Mike Wurst	United States	LW	—	—	—	—	—	—	—	—	—	—
1984	12	233	Peter Slanina	Slovakia	D	—	—	—	—	—	—	—	—	—	—
1985	1	1	Wendel Clark	Canada	LW	793	330	234	564	1690	—	—	—	—	—
1985	2	22	Ken Spangler	Canada	D	—	—	—	—	—	—	—	—	—	—
1985	3	43	Dave Thomlinson	Canada	LW	42	1	3	4	50	—	—	—	—	—
1985	4	64	Greg Vey	Canada	LW	—	—	—	—	—	—	—	—	—	—
1985	5	85	Jeff Serowik	United States	D	28	0	6	6	16	—	—	—	—	—
1985	6	106	Jiri Latal	Czech Republic	D	92	12	36	48	24	—	—	—	—	—
1985	7	127	Tim Bean	United States	LW	—	—	—	—	—	—	—	—	—	—
1985	8	148	Andy Donahue	United States	F	—	—	—	—	—	—	—	—	—	—
1985	9	169	Todd Whittemore	United States	F	—	—	—	—	—	—	—	—	—	—
1985	10	190	Bobby Reynolds	United States	LW	7	1	1	2	0	—	—	—	—	—
1985	11	211	Tim Armstrong	Canada	C	11	1	0	1	6	—	—	—	—	—
1985	12	232	Mitch Murphy	Canada	G	—	—	—	—	—	—	—	—	—	—
1986	1	6	Vincent Damphousse	Canada	C	1378	432	773	1205	1190	—	—	—	—	—
1986	2	36	Darryl Shannon	Canada	D	544	28	111	139	523	—	—	—	—	—
1986	3	48	Sean Bolland	Canada	D	—	—	—	—	—	—	—	—	—	—
1986	4	69	Kent Hulst	Canada	C	—	—	—	—	—	—	—	—	—	—
1986	5	90	Scott Taylor	Canada	D	—	—	—	—	—	—	—	—	—	—
1986	6	111	Stephane Giguere	Canada	LW	—	—	—	—	—	—	—	—	—	—
1986	7	132	Dan Hie	Canada	C	—	—	—	—	—	—	—	—	—	—
1986	8	153	Steve Brennan	United States	RW	—	—	—	—	—	—	—	—	—	—
1986	9	174	Brian Bellefeuille	United States	RW	—	—	—	—	—	—	—	—	—	—
1986	10	195	Sean Davidson	Canada	RW	—	—	—	—	—	—	—	—	—	—
1986	11	216	Mark Holick	Canada	RW	—	—	—	—	—	—	—	—	—	—
1986	12	237	Brian Hoard	Canada	D	—	—	—	—	—	—	—	—	—	—
1986	S	9	Art Fitzgerald	United States	G	—	—	—	—	—	—	—	—	—	—
1987	1	7	Luke Richardson	Canada	D	1417	35	166	201	2055	—	—	—	—	—
1987	2	28	Daniel Marois	Canada	RW	350	117	93	210	419	—	—	—	—	—
1987	3	49	John McIntyre	Canada	C	351	24	54	78	516	—	—	—	—	—
1987	4	71	Joe Sacco	United States	RW	738	94	119	213	421	—	—	—	—	—
1987	5	91	Mike Eastwood	Canada	C	783	87	149	236	354	—	—	—	—	—
1987	6	112	Damian Rhodes	United States	G	309	1	6	7	34	99	140	48	—	2.84
1987	7	133	Trevor Jobe	Canada	C	—	—	—	—	—	—	—	—	—	—
1987	8	154	Chris Jensen	United States	D	—	—	—	—	—	—	—	—	—	—
1987	9	175	Brian Blad	Canada	D	—	—	—	—	—	—	—	—	—	—
1987	10	196	Ron Bernacci	Canada	C	—	—	—	—	—	—	—	—	—	—
1987	11	217	Ken Alexander	United States	D	—	—	—	—	—	—	—	—	—	—
1987	12	238	Alex Weinrich	United States	D	—	—	—	—	—	—	—	—	—	—
1988	1	6	Scott Pearson	Canada	LW	292	56	42	98	615	—	—	—	—	—
1988	2	27	Tie Domi	Canada	RW	1020	104	141	245	3515	—	—	—	—	—
1988	3	48	Peter Ing	Canada	G	74	0	3	3	6	20	37	9	—	4.05
1988	4	69	Ted Crowley	United States	D	34	2	4	6	12	—	—	—	—	—
1988	5	86	Len Esau	Canada	D	27	0	10	10	24	—	—	—	—	—
1988	7	132	Matt Mallgrave	United States	F	—	—	—	—	—	—	—	—	—	—
1988	8	153	Roger Elvenes	Sweden	C	—	—	—	—	—	—	—	—	—	—
1988	9	174	Mike Delay	United States	D	—	—	—	—	—	—	—	—	—	—
1988	10	195	David Sacco	United States	C	35	5	13	18	22	—	—	—	—	—
1988	11	216	Mike Gregorio	United States	G	—	—	—	—	—	—	—	—	—	—
1988	12	237	Peter DeBoer	Canada	C	—	—	—	—	—	—	—	—	—	—
1988	S	11	Dean Anderson	Canada	G	—	—	—	—	—	—	—	—	—	—
1989	1	3	Scott Thornton	Canada	C	941	144	141	285	1459	—	—	—	—	—
1989	1	12	Rob Pearson	Canada	RW	269	56	54	110	645	—	—	—	—	—
1989	1	21	Steve Bancroft	Canada	D	6	0	1	1	2	—	—	—	—	—
1989	4	66	Matt Martin	United States	D	76	0	5	5	71	—	—	—	—	—
1989	5	96	Keith Carney	United States	D	—	—	—	—	—	—	—	—	—	—
1989	6	108	Dave Burke	United States	D	—	—	—	—	—	—	—	—	—	—
1989	6	125	Mike Doers	United States	W	—	—	—	—	—	—	—	—	—	—
1989	7	129	Keith Merkler	United States	F	—	—	—	—	—	—	—	—	—	—
1989	8	150	Derek Langille	Canada	D	—	—	—	—	—	—	—	—	—	—
1989	9	171	Jeff St. Laurent	United States	F	—	—	—	—	—	—	—	—	—	—
1989	10	192	Justin Tomberlin	United States	F	—	—	—	—	—	—	—	—	—	—
1989	11	213	Mike Jackson	Canada	RW	—	—	—	—	—	—	—	—	—	—
1989	12	234	Steve Chartrand	Canada	F	—	—	—	—	—	—	—	—	—	—
1989	S	3	Dave Tomlinson	Canada	C	42	1	3	4	28	—	—	—	—	—
1989	S	8	Mike Moes	Canada	C	—	—	—	—	—	—	—	—	—	—
1990	1	10	Drake Berehowsky	Canada	D	549	37	112	149	848	—	—	—	—	—
1990	2	31	Felix Potvin	Canada	G	635	0	16	16	82	266	260	85	—	2.76
1990	4	73	Darby Hendrickson	United States	C	518	65	64	129	370	—	—	—	—	—
1990	4	80	Greg Walters	Canada	LW	—	—	—	—	—	—	—	—	—	—
1990	6	115	Alexander Godynyuk	Ukraine	D	223	10	39	49	224	—	—	—	—	—
1990	7	136	Eric Lacroix	Canada	LW	472	67	70	137	361	—	—	—	—	—
1990	8	157	Dan Stiver	Canada	RW	—	—	—	—	—	—	—	—	—	—
1990	9	178	Robert Horyna	Czech Republic	G	—	—	—	—	—	—	—	—	—	—
1990	10	199	Bob Chebator	United States	LW	—	—	—	—	—	—	—	—	—	—
1990	11	220	Scott Malone	United States	D	—	—	—	—	—	—	—	—	—	—
1990	12	241	Nicholas Vachon	Canada	LW	1	0	0	0	0	—	—	—	—	—
1990	S	15	Martin Robitaille	Canada	C	—	—	—	—	—	—	—	—	—	—
1991	3	47	Yanic Perreault	Canada	C	859	247	269	516	402	—	—	—	—	—
1991	4	69	Terry Chitaroni	Canada	RW	—	—	—	—	—	—	—	—	—	—
1991	5	102	Alexei Kudashov	Russia	C	25	1	0	1	4	—	—	—	—	—
1991	6	113	Jeff Perry	Canada	LW	—	—	—	—	—	—	—	—	—	—
1991	6	120	Alexander Kuzminski	Russia	C	—	—	—	—	—	—	—	—	—	—
1991	7	135	Martin Prochazka	Czech Republic	RW	32	2	5	7	8	—	—	—	—	—
1991	8	160	Dmitri Mironov	Russia	D	556	54	206	260	568	—	—	—	—	—
1991	8	164	Robb McIntyre	United States	LW	—	—	—	—	—	—	—	—	—	—
1991	8	167	Tomas Kucharcik	Czech Republic	C	—	—	—	—	—	—	—	—	—	—
1991	9	179	Guy Lehoux	Canada	D	—	—	—	—	—	—	—	—	—	—
1991	10	201	Gary Miller	United States	D	—	—	—	—	—	—	—	—	—	—
1991	11	223	Jonathan Kelley	United States	C	—	—	—	—	—	—	—	—	—	—
1991	12	245	Chris O'Rourke	Canada	D	—	—	—	—	—	—	—	—	—	—
1991	S	3	Patrick McGarry	Canada	G	—	—	—	—	—	—	—	—	—	—
1991	S	9	Joe McCarthy	United States	LW	—	—	—	—	—	—	—	—	—	—
1992	1	8	Brandon Convery	Canada	C	72	9	19	28	36	—	—	—	—	—
1992	1	23	Grant Marshall	Canada	RW	700	92	147	239	793	—	—	—	—	—
1992	4	77	Nikolai Borschevsky	Russia	RW	162	49	73	122	44	—	—	—	—	—
1992	4	95	Mark Raiter	Canada	D	—	—	—	—	—	—	—	—	—	—
1992	5	101	Janne Gronvall	Finland	D	—	—	—	—	—	—	—	—	—	—
1992	5	106	Chris DeRuiter	Canada	F	—	—	—	—	—	—	—	—	—	—
1992	6	125	Mikael Hakansson	Sweden	C	—	—	—	—	—	—	—	—	—	—
1992	7	149	Patrik Augusta	Czech Republic	LW	4	0	0	0	0	—	—	—	—	—
1992	8	173	Ryan VandenBussche	Canada	RW	310	10	10	20	702	—	—	—	—	—
1992	9	197	Wayne Clarke	Canada	F	—	—	—	—	—	—	—	—	—	—
1992	10	221	Sergei Simonov	Russia	D	—	—	—	—	—	—	—	—	—	—
1992	11	245	Nathan Dempsey	Canada	D	260	21	67	88	120	—	—	—	—	—
1992	S	5	Nick Wohlers	United States	D	—	—	—	—	—	—	—	—	—	—
1993	1	12	Kenny Jonsson	Sweden	D	686	63	204	267	298	—	—	—	—	—
1993	1	19	Landon Wilson	United States	RW	375	53	66	119	352	—	—	—	—	—
1993	5	123	Zdenek Nedved	Czech Republic	C	31	4	6	10	14	—	—	—	—	—
1993	6	149	Paul Vincent	United States	W	—	—	—	—	—	—	—	—	—	—
1993	7	175	Jeff Andrews	Canada	LW	—	—	—	—	—	—	—	—	—	—
1993	8	201	David Brumby	Canada	G	—	—	—	—	—	—	—	—	—	—
1993	10	253	Kyle Ferguson	Canada	RW	—	—	—	—	—	—	—	—	—	—
1993	11	279	Mikhail Lapin	Russia	D	—	—	—	—	—	—	—	—	—	—
1994	1	16	Eric Fichaud	Canada	G	95	0	1	1	4	22	47	10	—	3.14
1994	2	48	Sean Haggerty	United States	LW	14	1	2	3	4	—	—	—	—	—
1994	3	64	Fredrik Modin	Sweden	LW	898	232	230	462	453	—	—	—	—	—
1994	5	126	Mark Deyell	Canada	C	—	—	—	—	—	—	—	—	—	—
1994	6	152	Kam White	Canada	D	—	—	—	—	—	—	—	—	—	—
1994	7	178	Tommi Rajamaki	Finland	D	—	—	—	—	—	—	—	—	—	—
1994	8	204	Rob Butler	United States	LW	—	—	—	—	—	—	—	—	—	—
1994	10	256	Sergei Berezin	Russia	LW	502	160	126	286	54	—	—	—	—	—
1994	11	282	Doug Nolan	United States	D	—	—	—	—	—	—	—	—	—	—
1995	1	15	Jeff Ware	Canada	D	21	0	1	1	12	—	—	—	—	—
1995	3	54	Ryan Pepperall	Canada	RW	—	—	—	—	—	—	—	—	—	—
1995	6	139	Doug Bonner	United States	G	—	—	—	—	—	—	—	—	—	—
1995	6	145	Yannick Tremblay	Canada	D	390	38	87	125	178	—	—	—	—	—
1995	7	171	Marek Melenovsky	Czech Republic	C	—	—	—	—	—	—	—	—	—	—
1995	8	197	Mark Murphy	United States	W	—	—	—	—	—	—	—	—	—	—
1995	9	223	Danny Markov	Russia	D	538	29	118	147	456	—	—	—	—	—
1996	2	36	Marek Posmyk	Czech Republic	D	19	1	2	3	20	—	—	—	—	—
1996	2	50	Francis Larivee	Canada	G	—	—	—	—	—	—	—	—	—	—
1996	3	66	Mike Lankshear	Canada	D	—	—	—	—	—	—	—	—	—	—
1996	3	68	Konstantin Kalmikov	Ukraine	RW	—	—	—	—	—	—	—	—	—	—
1996	4	86	Jason Sessa	United States	RW	—	—	—	—	—	—	—	—	—	—
1996	4	103	Vladimir Antipov	Russia	RW	—	—	—	—	—	—	—	—	—	—
1996	5	110	Peter Cava	Canada	C	—	—	—	—	—	—	—	—	—	—
1996	5	111	Brandon Sugden	Canada	RW	—	—	—	—	—	—	—	—	—	—
1996	6	140	Dmitriy Yakushin	Ukraine	D	2	0	0	0	2	—	—	—	—	—
1996	6	148	Chris Bogas	United States	D	—	—	—	—	—	—	—	—	—	—
1996	6	151	Lucio DeMartinis	Canada	LW	—	—	—	—	—	—	—	—	—	—
1996	7	178	Reggie Berg	United States	C	—	—	—	—	—	—	—	—	—	—
1996	8	204	Tomas Kaberle	Czech Republic	D	984	87	476	563	260	—	—	—	—	—
1996	9	230	Jared Hope	Canada	C	—	—	—	—	—	—	—	—	—	—
1997	3	57	Jeff Farkas	United States	C	11	0	2	2	6	—	—	—	—	—
1997	4	84	Adam Mair	Canada	C	615	38	76	114	829	—	—	—	—	—
1997	5	111	Frank Mrazek	Czech Republic	LW	—	—	—	—	—	—	—	—	—	—
1997	6	138	Eric Gooldy	United States	LW	—	—	—	—	—	—	—	—	—	—
1997	7	165	Hugo Marchand	Canada	D	—	—	—	—	—	—	—	—	—	—
1997	7	190	Shawn Thornton	Canada	RW	705	42	60	102	1103	—	—	—	—	—
1997	8	194	Russ Bartlett	United States	C	—	—	—	—	—	—	—	—	—	—
1997	9	221	Jonathan Hedstrom	Sweden	LW	83	13	14	27	48	—	—	—	—	—
1998	1	10	Nik Antropov	Kazakhstan	RW	788	193	272	465	627	—	—	—	—	—
1998	2	35	Petr Svoboda	Czech Republic	D	18	1	2	3	10	—	—	—	—	—
1998	3	69	Jamie Hodson	Canada	G	—	—	—	—	—	—	—	—	—	—
1998	4	87	Alexei Ponikarovsky	Ukraine	LW	678	139	184	323	419	—	—	—	—	—
1998	5	126	Morgan Warren	Canada	RW	—	—	—	—	—	—	—	—	—	—
1998	6	154	Allan Rourke	Canada	D	55	1	4	5	31	—	—	—	—	—
1998	7	181	Jonathan Gagnon	Canada	LW	—	—	—	—	—	—	—	—	—	—
1998	8	215	Dwight Wolfe	Canada	D	—	—	—	—	—	—	—	—	—	—
1998	8	228	Mikhail Travnicek	Czech Republic	LW	—	—	—	—	—	—	—	—	—	—
1998	9	236	Sergei Rostov	Russia	G	—	—	—	—	—	—	—	—	—	—
1999	1	24	Luca Cereda	Switzerland	C	—	—	—	—	—	—	—	—	—	—
1999	2	60	Peter Reynolds	Canada	D	—	—	—	—	—	—	—	—	—	—
1999	4	108	Mirko Murovic	Switzerland	LW	—	—	—	—	—	—	—	—	—	—
1999	4	110	Jonathan Zion	Canada	D	—	—	—	—	—	—	—	—	—	—
1999	5	151	Vaclav Zavoral	Czech Republic	D	—	—	—	—	—	—	—	—	—	—
1999	6	161	Jan Sochor	Czech Republic	F	—	—	—	—	—	—	—	—	—	—
1999	7	211	Vladimir Kulikov	Russia	G	—	—	—	—	—	—	—	—	—	—
1999	8	239	Pierre Hedin	Sweden	D	3	0	1	1	0	—	—	—	—	—
1999	9	267	Peter Metcalf	United States	D	—	—	—	—	—	—	—	—	—	—
2000	1	24	Brad Boyes	Canada	C	822	211	294	505	251	—	—	—	—	—
2000	2	51	Kris Vernarsky	United States	C	17	1	0	1	2	—	—	—	—	—
2000	3	70	Mikael Tellqvist	Sweden	G	114	0	2	2	2	45	41	2	10	3.01
2000	3	90	Jean-Francois Racine	Canada	G	—	—	—	—	—	—	—	—	—	—
2000	4	100	Miguel Delisle	Canada	C	—	—	—	—	—	—	—	—	—	—
2000	6	179	Vadim Sozinov	Kazakhstan	LW	—	—	—	—	—	—	—	—	—	—
2000	7	209	Markus Seikola	Finland	D	—	—	—	—	—	—	—	—	—	—
2000	7	223	Lubos Velebny	Slovakia	D	—	—	—	—	—	—	—	—	—	—
2000	8	254	Alexander Shinkar	Russia	RW	—	—	—	—	—	—	—	—	—	—
2000	9	265	Jean-Philippe Cote	Canada	D	27	0	4	4	26	—	—	—	—	—
2001	1	17	Carlo Colaiacovo	Canada	D	470	34	123	157	231	—	—	—	—	—
2001	2	39	Karel Pilar	Czech Republic	D	90	6	24	30	42	—	—	—	—	—
2001	3	65	Brendan Bell	Canada	D	102	7	21	28	51	—	—	—	—	—
2001	3	82	Jay Harrison	Canada	D	372	23	52	75	360	—	—	—	—	—
2001	3	88	Nicolas Corbeil	Canada	C	—	—	—	—	—	—	—	—	—	—
2001	5	134	Kyle Wellwood	Canada	C	489	92	143	235	36	—	—	—	—	—
2001	6	168	Maxim Kondratiev	Russia	D	40	1	2	3	24	—	—	—	—	—
2001	6	183	Jaroslav Sklenar	Czech Republic	LW	—	—	—	—	—	—	—	—	—	—
2001	7	198	Ivan Kolozvary	Slovakia	F	—	—	—	—	—	—	—	—	—	—
2001	7	213	Jan Chovan	Slovakia	G	—	—	—	—	—	—	—	—	—	—
2001	8	246	Tomas Mojzis	Czech Republic	D	17	1	2	3	14	—	—	—	—	—
2001	9	276	Mike Knoepfli	Switzerland	F	—	—	—	—	—	—	—	—	—	—
2002	1	24	Alexander Steen	Sweden	LW	1018	245	377	622	454	—	—	—	—	—
2002	2	57	Matt Stajan	Canada	C	1003	146	267	424	526	—	—	—	—	—
2002	3	74	Todd Ford	Canada	G	—	—	—	—	—	—	—	—	—	—
2002	3	88	Dominic D'Amour	Canada	D	—	—	—	—	—	—	—	—	—	—
2002	4	122	David Turon	Czech Republic	D	—	—	—	—	—	—	—	—	—	—
2002	6	191	Ian White	Canada	D	503	45	134	179	254	—	—	—	—	—
2002	7	222	Scott May	Canada	C	—	—	—	—	—	—	—	—	—	—
2002	8	254	Jarkko Immonen	Finland	C	20	3	5	8	4	—	—	—	—	—
2002	9	285	Staffan Kronwall	Sweden	D	66	1	3	4	23	—	—	—	—	—
2003	2	57	John Doherty	United States	D	—	—	—	—	—	—	—	—	—	—
2003	3	91	Martin Sagat	Slovakia	LW	—	—	—	—	—	—	—	—	—	—
2003	4	125	Konstantin Volkov	Russia	RW	—	—	—	—	—	—	—	—	—	—
2003	5	158	John Mitchell	Canada	C	548	70	107	177	267	—	—	—	—	—
2003	7	220	Jeremy Williams	Canada	RW	32	9	2	11	6	—	—	—	—	—
2003	8	237	Shaun Landolt	Canada	C	—	—	—	—	—	—	—	—	—	—
2004	3	70	Justin Pogge	Canada	G	7	0	0	0	0	1	4	—	1	4.35
2004	4	113	Roman Kukumberg	Slovakia	F	—	—	—	—	—	—	—	—	—	—
2004	5	157	Dmitry Vorobiev	Russia	D	—	—	—	—	—	—	—	—	—	—
2004	6	187	Robbie Earl	United States	LW	47	6	1	7	6	—	—	—	—	—
2004	7	220	Maxim Semenov	Kazakhstan	D	—	—	—	—	—	—	—	—	—	—
2004	8	252	Jan Steber	Czech Republic	C	—	—	—	—	—	—	—	—	—	—
2004	9	285	Pierce Norton	United States	RW	—	—	—	—	—	—	—	—	—	—
2005	1	21	Tuukka Rask	Finland	G	564	0	17	17	26	308	165	—	66	2.28
2005	3	82	Phil Oreskovic	Canada	D	10	1	1	2	21	—	—	—	—	—
2005	5	153	Alex Berry	United States	RW	—	—	—	—	—	—	—	—	—	—
2005	6	173	Johan Dahlberg	Sweden	LW	—	—	—	—	—	—	—	—	—	—
2005	7	216	Anton Stralman	Sweden	D	938	63	230	293	287	—	—	—	—	—
2005	7	228	Chad Rau	United States	C	9	2	0	2	0	—	—	—	—	—
2006	1	13	Jiri Tlusty	Czech Republic	LW	446	89	88	177	126	—	—	—	—	—
2006	2	44	Nikolai Kulemin	Russia	LW	669	121	153	274	173	—	—	—	—	—
2006	4	99	James Reimer	Canada	G	539	0	3	3	20	232	191	—	67	2.87
2006	4	111	Korbinian Holzer	Germany	D	206	6	21	27	139	—	—	—	—	—
2006	6	161	Viktor Stalberg	Sweden	LW	488	82	86	168	245	—	—	—	—	—
2006	6	166	Tyler Ruegsegger	United States	C	—	—	—	—	—	—	—	—	—	—
2006	6	180	Leo Komarov	Finland	C	491	63	107	170	207	—	—	—	—	—
2007	3	74	Dale Mitchell	Canada	RW	—	—	—	—	—	—	—	—	—	—
2007	4	99	Matt Frattin	Canada	RW	135	17	18	35	44	—	—	—	—	—
2007	4	104	Ben Winnett	Canada	LW	—	—	—	—	—	—	—	—	—	—
2007	5	134	Juraj Mikus	Slovakia	D	—	—	—	—	—	—	—	—	—	—
2007	6	164	Chris DiDomenico	Canada	C	27	6	4	10	14	—	—	—	—	—
2007	7	194	Carl Gunnarsson	Sweden	D	629	30	108	138	179	—	—	—	—	—
2008	1	5	Luke Schenn	Canada	D	1072	44	161	205	852	—	—	—	—	—
2008	2	60	Jimmy Hayes	United States	RW	334	54	55	109	149	—	—	—	—	—
2008	4	98	Mikhail Stefanovich	Belarus	C	—	—	—	—	—	—	—	—	—	—
2008	5	128	Greg Pateryn	United States	D	290	5	39	44	178	—	—	—	—	—
2008	5	129	Joel Champagne	Canada	C	—	—	—	—	—	—	—	—	—	—
2008	5	130	Jerome Flaake	Germany	C	—	—	—	—	—	—	—	—	—	—
2008	6	158	Grant Rollheiser	Canada	G	—	—	—	—	—	—	—	—	—	—
2008	7	188	Andrew MacWilliam	Canada	D	12	0	2	2	12	—	—	—	—	—
2009	1	7	Nazem Kadri	Canada	C	1062	323	437	760	790	—	—	—	—	—
2009	2	50	Kenny Ryan	United States	RW	—	—	—	—	—	—	—	—	—	—
2009	2	58	Jesse Blacker	Canada	D	1	0	0	0	0	—	—	—	—	—
2009	3	68	Jamie Devane	Canada	LW	2	0	0	0	0	—	—	—	—	—
2009	5	128	Eric Knodel	United States	D	—	—	—	—	—	—	—	—	—	—
2009	6	158	Jerry D'Amigo	United States	LW	31	1	2	3	2	—	—	—	—	—
2009	7	188	Barron Smith	United States	D	—	—	—	—	—	—	—	—	—	—
2010	2	43	Brad Ross	Canada	LW	—	—	—	—	—	—	—	—	—	—
2010	3	62	Greg McKegg	Canada	C	233	21	18	39	65	—	—	—	—	—
2010	3	79	Sondre Olden	Norway	F	—	—	—	—	—	—	—	—	—	—
2010	4	116	Petter Granberg	Sweden	D	45	0	2	2	29	—	—	—	—	—
2010	5	144	Sam Carrick	Canada	C	393	43	46	89	439	—	—	—	—	—
2010	5	146	Daniel Brodin	Sweden	RW	—	—	—	—	—	—	—	—	—	—
2010	7	182	Josh Nicholls	Canada	C	—	—	—	—	—	—	—	—	—	—
2011	1	22	Tyler Biggs	United States	RW	—	—	—	—	—	—	—	—	—	—
2011	1	25	Stuart Percy	Canada	D	12	0	3	3	2	—	—	—	—	—
2011	3	86	Josh Leivo	Canada	LW	265	42	51	93	93	—	—	—	—	—
2011	4	100	Tom Nilsson	Sweden	D	—	—	—	—	—	—	—	—	—	—
2011	5	130	Tony Cameranesi	United States	C	—	—	—	—	—	—	—	—	—	—
2011	6	152	David Broll	Canada	LW	5	0	1	1	5	—	—	—	—	—
2011	6	173	Dennis Robertson	Canada	D	—	—	—	—	—	—	—	—	—	—
2011	7	190	Garret Sparks	United States	G	40	0	0	0	0	15	18	—	2	3.06
2011	7	203	Max Everson	United States	D	—	—	—	—	—	—	—	—	—	—
2012	1	5	Morgan Rielly	Canada	D	951	98	451	549	279	—	—	—	—	—
2012	2	35	Matt Finn	Canada	D	—	—	—	—	—	—	—	—	—	—
2012	5	126	Dominic Toninato	United States	C	197	13	23	36	85	—	—	—	—	—
2012	6	156	Connor Brown	Canada	RW	676	125	176	301	132	—	—	—	—	—
2012	6	157	Ryan Rupert	Canada	C	—	—	—	—	—	—	—	—	—	—
2012	7	209	Viktor Loov	Sweden	D	4	0	2	2	0	—	—	—	—	—
2013	1	21	Frederik Gauthier	Canada	C	178	13	18	31	47	—	—	—	—	—
2013	3	82	Carter Verhaeghe	Canada	C	488	172	185	357	247	—	—	—	—	—
2013	5	142	Fabrice Herzog	Switzerland	RW	—	—	—	—	—	—	—	—	—	—
2013	6	172	Antoine Bibeau	Canada	G	4	0	0	0	0	2	1	—	0	2.52
2013	7	202	Andreas Johnsson	Sweden	LW	259	48	68	116	94	—	—	—	—	—
2014	1	8	William Nylander	Sweden	C	750	292	399	691	200	—	—	—	—	—
2014	3	68	Rinat Valiev	Russia	D	12	0	0	0	2	—	—	—	—	—
2014	4	103	J. J. Piccinich	United States	RW	—	—	—	—	—	—	—	—	—	—
2014	5	128	Dakota Joshua	United States	C	296	50	46	96	230	—	—	—	—	—
2014	6	158	Nolan Vesey	United States	LW	—	—	—	—	—	—	—	—	—	—
2014	7	188	Pierre Engvall	Sweden	LW	380	65	70	135	117	—	—	—	—	—
2015	1	4	Mitch Marner	Canada	C	738	245	576	821	222	—	—	—	—	—
2015	2	34	Travis Dermott	Canada	D	348	16	46	62	130	—	—	—	—	—
2015	2	61	Jeremy Bracco	United States	RW	—	—	—	—	—	—	—	—	—	—
2015	3	65	Andrew Nielsen	Canada	D	—	—	—	—	—	—	—	—	—	—
2015	3	68	Martins Dzierkals	Latvia	LW	—	—	—	—	—	—	—	—	—	—
2015	4	95	Jesper Lindgren	Sweden	D	—	—	—	—	—	—	—	—	—	—
2015	5	125	Dmytro Timashov	Ukraine	LW	45	4	5	9	16	—	—	—	—	—
2015	6	155	Stephen Desrocher	Canada	D	—	—	—	—	—	—	—	—	—	—
2015	7	185	Nikita Korostelev	Russia	RW	—	—	—	—	—	—	—	—	—	—
2016	1	1	Auston Matthews	United States	C	689	428	352	780	152	—	—	—	—	—
2016	2	31	Yegor Korshkov	Russia	RW	1	1	0	1	0	—	—	—	—	—
2016	2	57	Carl Grundstrom	Sweden	RW	339	52	37	89	127	—	—	—	—	—
2016	3	62	Joseph Woll	United States	G	117	0	1	1	4	63	43	—	9	2.93
2016	3	72	James Greenway	United States	D	—	—	—	—	—	—	—	—	—	—
2016	4	92	Adam Brooks	Canada	C	43	6	5	11	2	—	—	—	—	—
2016	4	101	Keaton Middleton	Canada	D	47	0	3	3	36	—	—	—	—	—
2016	5	122	Vladmir Bobylev	Russia	RW	—	—	—	—	—	—	—	—	—	—
2016	6	152	Jack Walker	United States	LW	—	—	—	—	—	—	—	—	—	—
2016	6	179	Nicolas Mattinen	Canada	D	—	—	—	—	—	—	—	—	—	—
2016	7	182	Nikolai Chebykin	Russia	LW	—	—	—	—	—	—	—	—	—	—
2017	1	17	Timothy Liljegren	Sweden	D	311	21	72	93	131	—	—	—	—	—
2017	2	59	Eemeli Rasanen	Finland	D	—	—	—	—	—	—	—	—	—	—
2017	4	110	Ian Scott	Canada	G	—	—	—	—	—	—	—	—	—	—
2017	4	124	Vladislav Kara	Russia	C	—	—	—	—	—	—	—	—	—	—
2017	5	141	Fedor Gordeev	Canada	D	—	—	—	—	—	—	—	—	—	—
2017	6	172	Ryan McGregor	Canada	LW	—	—	—	—	—	—	—	—	—	—
2017	7	203	Ryan O'Connell	Canada	D	—	—	—	—	—	—	—	—	—	—
2018	1	29	Rasmus Sandin	Sweden	D	382	25	120	145	112	—	—	—	—	—
2018	2	52	Sean Durzi	Canada	D	302	30	114	144	237	—	—	—	—	—
2018	3	76	Semyon Der-Arguchintsev	Russia	C	1	0	0	0	0	—	—	—	—	—
2018	3	83	Riley Stotts	Canada	C	—	—	—	—	—	—	—	—	—	—
2018	4	118	Mac Hollowell	Canada	D	6	0	2	2	2	—	—	—	—	—
2018	5	149	Filip Kral	Czech Republic	D	2	0	0	0	2	—	—	—	—	—
2018	6	156	Pontus Holmberg	Sweden	RW	229	30	41	71	94	—	—	—	—	—
2018	7	209	Zachary Bouthillier	Canada	G	—	—	—	—	—	—	—	—	—	—
2018	7	211	Semyon Kizimov	Russia	RW	—	—	—	—	—	—	—	—	—	—
2019	2	53	Nicholas Robertson	United States	LW	234	48	40	88	34	—	—	—	—	—
2019	3	84	Mikko Kokkonen	Finland	D	—	—	—	—	—	—	—	—	—	—
2019	4	115	Mikhail Abramov	Russia	C	—	—	—	—	—	—	—	—	—	—
2019	4	124	Nicholas Abruzzese	United States	C	11	1	2	3	2	—	—	—	—	—
2019	5	146	Michael Koster	United States	D	—	—	—	—	—	—	—	—	—	—
2019	7	204	Kalle Loponen	Finland	D	—	—	—	—	—	—	—	—	—	—
2020	1	15	Rodion Amirov	Russia	C	—	—	—	—	—	—	—	—	—	—
2020	2	59	Roni Hirvonen	Finland	C	—	—	—	—	—	—	—	—	—	—
2020	3	64	Topi Niemelä	Finland	D	—	—	—	—	—	—	—	—	—	—
2020	4	106	Artur Akhtyamov	Russia	G	3	0	0	0	0	0	2	—	0	4.76
2020	4	122	William Villeneuve	Canada	D	3	0	0	0	0	—	—	—	—	—
2020	5	137	Dmitri Ovchinnikov	Russia	F	—	—	—	—	—	—	—	—	—	—
2020	6	168	Veeti Miettinen	Finland	RW	—	—	—	—	—	—	—	—	—	—
2020	6	177	Axel Rindell	Finland	D	—	—	—	—	—	—	—	—	—	—
2020	6	180	Joe Miller	United States	F	—	—	—	—	—	—	—	—	—	—
2020	7	189	John Fusco	United States	D	—	—	—	—	—	—	—	—	—	—
2020	7	195	Wyatt Schingoethe	United States	C	—	—	—	—	—	—	—	—	—	—
2020	7	213	Ryan Tverberg	Canada	C	2	0	0	0	2	—	—	—	—	—
2021	2	57	Matthew Knies	United States	LW	240	67	93	160	119	—	—	—	—	—
2021	5	153	Ty Voit	United States	LW	—	—	—	—	—	—	—	—	—	—
2021	6	185	Vyacheslav Peksa	Russia	G	—	—	—	—	—	—	—	—	—	—
2022	2	38	Fraser Minten	Canada	C	107	20	20	40	24	—	—	—	—	—
2022	3	95	Nicholas Moldenhauer	Canada	C	—	—	—	—	—	—	—	—	—	—
2022	4	122	Dennis Hildeby	Sweden	G	26	0	0	0	0	8	10	—	4	2.89
2022	5	135	Nikita Grebyonkin	Russia	RW	62	4	10	14	46	—	—	—	—	—
2022	7	218	Brandon Lisowsky	Canada	LW	—	—	—	—	—	—	—	—	—	—
2023	1	28	Easton Cowan	Canada	RW	66	11	18	29	45	—	—	—	—	—
2023	5	153	Hudson Malinoski	Canada	C	—	—	—	—	—	—	—	—	—	—
2023	6	185	Noah Chadwick	Canada	D	—	—	—	—	—	—	—	—	—	—
2024	1	31	Ben Danford	Canada	D	—	—	—	—	—	—	—	—	—	—
2024	4	120	Victor Johansson	Sweden	D	—	—	—	—	—	—	—	—	—	—
2024	5	151	Miroslav Holinka	Czechia	C	—	—	—	—	—	—	—	—	—	—
2024	5	152	Alexander Plesovskikh	Russia	LW	—	—	—	—	—	—	—	—	—	—
2024	5	157	Timofei Obvintsev	Russia	G	—	—	—	—	—	—	—	—	—	—
2024	7	200	Matt Lahey	Canada	D	—	—	—	—	—	—	—	—	—	—
2024	7	216	Sam McCue	Canada	LW	—	—	—	—	—	—	—	—	—	—
2024	7	225	Nathan Mayes	Canada	D	—	—	—	—	—	—	—	—	—	—
2025	2	64	Tinus Luc Koblar	Norway	C	—	—	—	—	—	—	—	—	—	—
2025	3	96	Tyler Hopkins	Canada	C	—	—	—	—	—	—	—	—	—	—
2025	5	137	William Belle	United States	RW	—	—	—	—	—	—	—	—	—	—
2025	5	153	Harry Nansi	Canada	C	—	—	—	—	—	—	—	—	—	—
2025	6	185	Rylan Fellinger	Canada	D	—	—	—	—	—	—	—	—	—	—
2025	7	217	Matthew Hlacar	Canada	LW	—	—	—	—	—	—	—	—	—	—
2026	1	1	Gavin McKenna	Canada	LW	—	—	—	—	—	—	—	—	—	—
2026	2	60	Alexander Bilecki	Canada	D	—	—	—	—	—	—	—	—	—	—
2026	3	69	Ethan MacKenzie	Canada	D	—	—	—	—	—	—	—	—	—	—
2026	3	73	Zac Olsen	Canada	C	—	—	—	—	—	—	—	—	—	—
2026	3	76	Mans Gundmansson	Sweden	D	—	—	—	—	—	—	—	—	—	—
2026	3	85	Juuso Ainasto	Finland	G	—	—	—	—	—	—	—	—	—	—
2026	4	114	Patriks Plumins	Latvia	G	—	—	—	—	—	—	—	—	—	—
2026	5	158	Cooper Williams	Canada	C	—	—	—	—	—	—	—	—	—	—
2026	6	161	Yaroslav Fedoseyev	Russia	D	—	—	—	—	—	—	—	—	—	—
2026	6	169	Brody Pepoy	United States	C	—	—	—	—	—	—	—	—	—	—

== See also ==
- List of Toronto Maple Leafs players
