= Brad Boyes =

Canadian ice hockey player (born 1982)

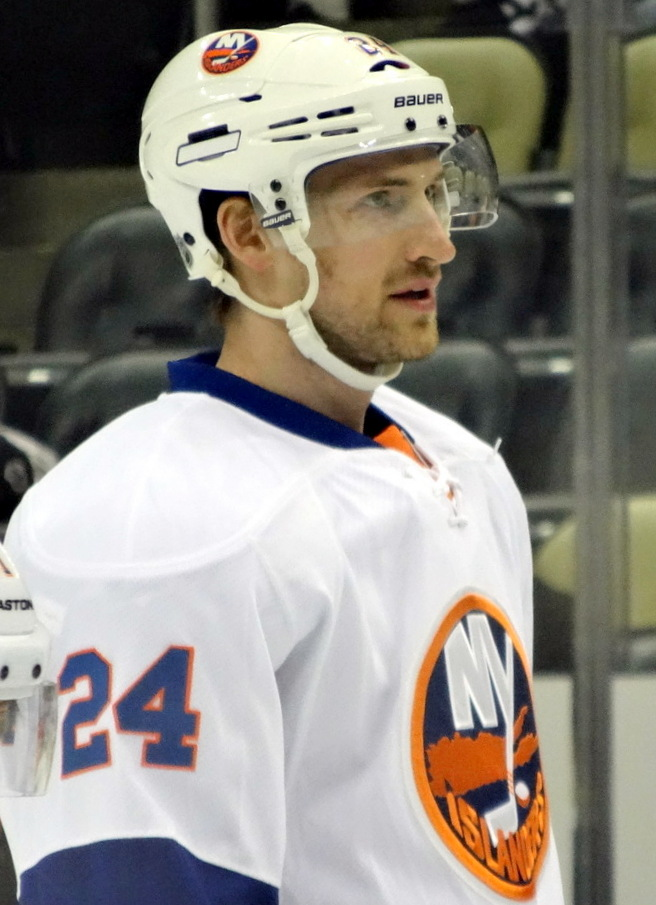
- Boyes with the New York Islanders during the 2013 Stanley Cup playoffs
- Born: April 17, 1982 (age 44) Mississauga, Ontario, Canada
- Height: 6 ft 0 in (183 cm)
- Weight: 199 lb (90 kg; 14 st 3 lb)
- Position: Right wing
- Shot: Right
- Played for: San Jose Sharks; Boston Bruins; St. Louis Blues; Buffalo Sabres; New York Islanders; Florida Panthers; Toronto Maple Leafs
- National team: Canada
- NHL draft: 24th overall, 2000; Toronto Maple Leafs
- Playing career: 2002–2016

Bradley Keith Boyes (born April 17, 1982) is a Canadian former professional ice hockey player, who spent thirteen seasons in the National Hockey League (NHL) as a member of seven different teams.

Boyes made his NHL debut in 2003 for the San Jose Sharks, but only played in one game before returning to the AHL. He returned to the NHL during the 2005-2006 season with the Boston Bruins, playing for the team for two seasons before being traded to the St. Louis Blues in 2007, where he had his longest stint at five seasons. Traded to the Buffalo Sabres in 2010, he remained with the team for two seasons before being acquired by the New York Islanders in 2012. After one season with the Islanders, Boyes spent the next two seasons with the Florida Panthers, before playing for the Toronto Maple Leafs during the 2015-2016 season.

== Early life ==
Boyes went to Hazel McCallion Senior Public School and Clarkson Secondary School, both in Mississauga, before moving to Erie, Pennsylvania. His mother is a teacher. His father is a school principal, and was the principal of Champlain Trail Public School. His father is also one of the directors of the Streetsville Hockey League, a small house league based in Streetsville.

Despite living in the Greater Toronto Area, Boyes was an Ottawa Senators fan growing up. However, the hometown Toronto Maple Leafs were Boyes' "second team", and he would later say that he "always wanted to play for the Leafs".

== Playing career ==
As a youth, Boyes played in the 1996 Quebec International Pee-Wee Hockey Tournament with the Toronto Young Nationals minor ice hockey team. Boyes played several years of roller hockey for the Mississauga Rattlers. He was a member of the Mississauga Reps AAA hockey team before being drafted by the Erie Otters of the Ontario Hockey League (OHL). Boyes won the J. Ross Robertson Cup with the Otters in 2002. In four years with the Otters he registered 141 goals and 309 points in 233 games. He was the OHL's Most Outstanding Player in the 2000–01 season and was twice named the league's most sportsmanlike.

Boyes was drafted by the Toronto Maple Leafs in the first round, 24th overall in the 2000 NHL entry draft. He joined the Maple Leafs American Hockey League (AHL) affiliate, the St. John's Maple Leafs, for the 2001–02 season, playing in 65 games. On March 9, 2002, he was traded to the San Jose Sharks along with Alyn McCauley and a 1st-round selection in the 2003 NHL entry draft in exchange for Owen Nolan. Boyes was assigned to the Sharks' AHL affiliate, the Cleveland Barons. The next season he spent mostly with Cleveland until he was recalled and played in his first NHL game on March 7. Two days later Boyes was traded from the Sharks to the Boston Bruins in a three-way deal that saw Jeff Jillson go to the Buffalo Sabres, Curtis Brown go to San Jose, and Boyes and Andy Delmore go to Boston on March 9, 2004.

Boyes was once again assigned to the AHL for the 2004–05 season, this time to the Bruins' affiliate, the Providence Bruins, where he scored 33 goals and 75 points for second on the team and added 8 goals and 15 points in 16 playoff games. He re-signed with Boston in the off-season. Boyes made the Bruins out of training camp for the 2005–06 season and scored his first NHL goal on October 8, 2005, against Sébastien Caron of the Pittsburgh Penguins. He scored his first NHL hat trick on March 18, 2006, against Cam Ward of the Carolina Hurricanes. He finished the season with 26 goals and 69 points in 82 games and was named to the NHL All-Rookie Team. Boyes signed a two-year contract extension in the off-season. The following season Boyes struggled, scoring only 13 goals and 34 points in 62 games. On trade deadline day, the Bruins traded Boyes to the St. Louis Blues in exchange for Dennis Wideman on February 27, 2007.

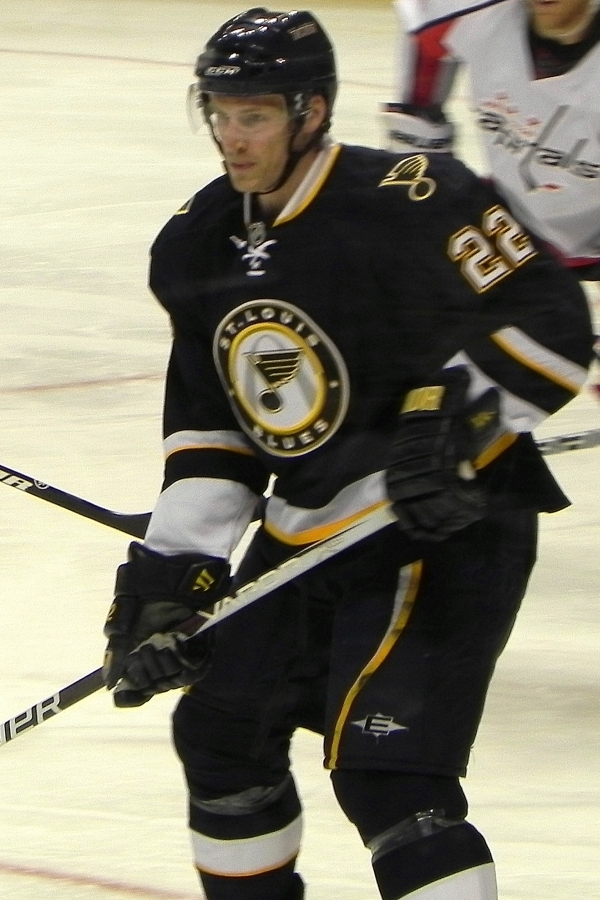
Boyes with the St. Louis Blues in December 2010

After arriving in St. Louis, Boyes would score 4 more goals in 19 games. In St. Louis Boyes became a star player, scoring 43 goals in the 2007–08 season. On March 1, 2008, he signed a four-year contract with St. Louis. He followed this up with 33 goals in the 2008–09 season. The following two seasons were a disappointment, with just 14 goals and 12 goals during that time. On February 27, 2011, Boyes was traded by the Blues to the Buffalo Sabres in exchange for a second-round pick in the 2011 NHL entry draft. Boyes scored a goal in his Sabres debut on March 2, 2011. He scored again in the following game. In his second season with Buffalo Boyes registered 8 goals and 23 points. During his final season with the Sabres, Boyes became the 20th player in NHL history to play in 500 consecutive games. By the end of his tenure with the Sabres, he was a healthy scratch from the lineup and alternated between centre and winger, failing to get comfortable when in the lineup.

On July 1, 2012, Boyes signed as a free agent to a one-year, $1 million deal with the New York Islanders. With the ambition to move on from a disappointing tenure with the Sabres, Boyes rediscovered his scoring touch during the shortened 2012–13 season to score 35 points in 48 games on the Islanders top scoring line alongside John Tavares and Matt Moulson.

Unsigned in the offseason, Boyes was offered a professional try-out contract by the Islanders and the Florida Panthers. He chose to attend the Panthers training camp and signed a one-year deal with them on September 28, 2013. After recording 36 points in 78 games, Boyes was resigned by the Panthers to a two-year, $5.25 million contract.

The last year of Boyes' contract was bought out on June 30, 2015, effectively making Boyes a free agent. Despite picking up 38 points in 78 games and having good advanced analytics, Boyes was unable to find a deal, and on September 10, 2015, he signed a professional tryout contract to attend training camp with the Toronto Maple Leafs, the team who originally drafted him in 2000. Boyes impressed at camp and during the pre-season, and on September 27, 2015, he was rewarded with a 1-year, $700,000 contract from the Leafs. On November 2, 2015, Boyes scored his first goal with the club. In the process, Boyes set a franchise record for the longest span between getting drafted and scoring his first goal with the Maple Leafs, notching it 5,609 days after being drafted. Boyes would finish the season with 24 points in 60 games. Boyes once again became an unrestricted free agent at the end of the season.

== Career statistics ==
=== Regular season and playoffs ===
			Regular season					Playoffs
Season	Team	League	GP	G	A	Pts	PIM	GP	G	A	Pts	PIM
1997–98	Mississauga Reps AAA	MTHL	44	27	50	77		—	—	—	—	—
1998–99	Erie Otters	OHL	59	24	36	60	30	5	1	2	3	10
1999–2000	Erie Otters	OHL	68	36	46	82	38	13	6	8	14	10
2000–01	Erie Otters	OHL	59	45	45	90	42	15	10	13	23	8
2001–02	Erie Otters	OHL	47	36	41	77	42	21	22	19	41	27
2002–03	St. John's Maple Leafs	AHL	65	23	28	51	45	—	—	—	—	—
2002–03	Cleveland Barons	AHL	15	7	6	13	21	—	—	—	—	—
2003–04	Cleveland Barons	AHL	61	25	35	60	38	—	—	—	—	—
2003–04	San Jose Sharks	NHL	1	0	0	0	2	—	—	—	—	—
2003–04	Providence Bruins	AHL	17	6	6	12	13	2	1	0	1	0
2004–05	Providence Bruins	AHL	80	33	42	75	58	16	8	7	15	23
2005–06	Boston Bruins	NHL	82	26	43	69	30	—	—	—	—	—
2006–07	Boston Bruins	NHL	62	13	21	34	25	—	—	—	—	—
2006–07	St. Louis Blues	NHL	19	4	8	12	4	—	—	—	—	—
2007–08	St. Louis Blues	NHL	82	43	22	65	20	—	—	—	—	—
2008–09	St. Louis Blues	NHL	82	33	39	72	26	4	2	1	3	0
2009–10	St. Louis Blues	NHL	82	14	28	42	26	—	—	—	—	—
2010–11	St. Louis Blues	NHL	62	12	29	41	30	—	—	—	—	—
2010–11	Buffalo Sabres	NHL	20	5	9	14	6	7	1	0	1	0
2011–12	Buffalo Sabres	NHL	65	8	15	23	6	—	—	—	—	—
2012–13	New York Islanders	NHL	48	10	25	35	16	6	0	3	3	2
2013–14	Florida Panthers	NHL	78	21	15	36	28	—	—	—	—	—
2014–15	Florida Panthers	NHL	78	14	24	38	20	—	—	—	—	—
2015–16	Toronto Maple Leafs	NHL	60	8	16	24	12	—	—	—	—	—
AHL totals			238	94	117	211	175	18	9	7	16	23
NHL totals			822	211	294	505	251	17	3	4	7	2

=== International ===
Medal record

Representing Canada

Ice hockey

World Junior Championships
Bronze medal – third place	2001 Moscow	
Silver medal – second place	2002 Pardubice	

Year	Team	Event	Result	GP	G	A	Pts	PIM
2001	Canada	WJC	3rd place, bronze medalist(s)	7	1	3	4	2
2002	Canada	WJC	2nd place, silver medalist(s)	7	5	4	9	16
2006	Canada	WC	4th	9	4	4	8	4
Junior totals				14	6	7	13	18
Senior totals				9	4	4	8	4

== Awards and honours ==
- 1997: Canadian inline hockey champion - Gold medalist
- 1998: NARCh North American Roller Hockey Championships - Gold medalist
- 1999–2000: Lindsay Cup Trophy
- 1999–2000: CHL Scholastic Player of the Year
- 1999–2000: OHL Bobby Smith Trophy (Scholastic Player of the Year)
- 2000–01: OHL Red Tilson Trophy (Most Outstanding Player)
- 2000–01: OHL William Hanley Trophy (Most Gentlemanly Player)
- 2000–01: OHL Second All-Star Team
- 2001–02: CHL Sportsman of the Year
- 2001–02: CHL Second All-Star Team
- 2001–02: OHL First All-Star Team
- 2001–02: OHL Red Tilson Trophy
- 2001–02: OHL William Hanley Trophy
- 2001–02: OHL Wayne Gretzky 99 Award (Playoff MVP)
- 2002–03: AHL All-Rookie Team
- 2003–04: AHL Second All-Star Team
- 2005–06: NHL All-Rookie Team

Awards and achievements
Preceded by Luca Cereda	Toronto Maple Leafs first-round draft pick 2000	Succeeded by Carlo Colaiacovo
