= Luca Cereda =

Swiss ice hockey player (born 1981)

- Born: September 7, 1981 (age 44) Sementina, Switzerland
- Height: 6 ft 2 in (188 cm)
- Weight: 202 lb (92 kg; 14 st 6 lb)
- Position: Forward
- NHL draft: 24th overall, 1999; Toronto Maple Leafs
- Playing career: 1998–2007

Luca Cereda (born September 7, 1981) is a Swiss former professional ice hockey forward. He was drafted in the first round, 24th overall, of the 1999 NHL entry draft by the Toronto Maple Leafs. During his first training camp with the Leafs, Cereda was diagnosed with a heart murmur due to a defect in his aortic valve. Apart from exhibition games with the Leafs before the diagnosis, he never appeared in a National Hockey League (NHL) game. After his recovery from his heart surgery, he played in the Leafs' minor league team for a few years and returned to Switzerland in 2004 to play in the National League instead. He ended his playing career in 2008 due to heart problems and began coaching. In 2017, Cereda succeeded Gordie Dwyer to become the head coach of HC Ambrì-Piotta.

== Career statistics ==
=== Regular season and playoffs ===
			Regular season					Playoffs
Season	Team	League	GP	G	A	Pts	PIM	GP	G	A	Pts	PIM
1996–97	HC Ambrì–Piotta	SUI U20	35	13	8	21	26	—	—	—	—	—
1997–98	HC Ambrì–Piotta	SUI U20	28	17	27	44	24	—	—	—	—	—
1997–98	GDT Bellinzona	SUI.5
1998–99	HC Ambrì–Piotta	SUI U20	3	4	3	7	20	—	—	—	—	—
1998–99	HC Ambrì–Piotta	NDA	38	6	10	16	8	15	0	6	6	4
1998–99	GDT Bellinzona	SUI.4
1999–2000	HC Ambrì–Piotta	SUI U20	3	0	0	0	2	—	—	—	—	—
1999–2000	HC Ambrì–Piotta	NLA	43	1	5	6	14	9	0	1	1	2
2001–02	St. John's Maple Leafs	AHL	71	5	8	13	23	11	2	1	3	10
2002–03	St. John's Maple Leafs	AHL	78	7	18	25	26	—	—	—	—	—
2003–04	St. John's Maple Leafs	AHL	22	0	2	2	8	—	—	—	—	—
2003–04	SC Bern	NLA	9	1	3	4	22	15	4	0	4	4
2004–05	SC Bern	NLA	37	1	1	2	2	11	0	1	1	2
2005–06	HC Ambrì–Piotta	NLA	42	6	16	22	51	7	1	1	2	4
2006–07	HC Ambrì–Piotta	NLA	30	3	14	17	26	—	—	—	—	—
NDA/NLA totals			199	18	49	67	123	57	5	9	14	16
AHL totals			171	12	28	40	57	11	2	1	3	10

=== International ===
Year	Team	Event	GP	G	A	Pts	PIM
1998	Switzerland	EJC	6	1	1	2	4
1999	Switzerland	WJC	6	1	0	1	10
1999	Switzerland	WJC18	7	2	8	10	10
2000	Switzerland	WJC	7	2	4	6	14
2003	Switzerland	WC	7	0	2	2	2
2004	Switzerland	WC	5	0	0	0	2
Junior totals			26	6	13	19	38
Senior totals			12	0	2	2	4

Preceded by Nik Antropov	Toronto Maple Leafs first-round draft pick 1999	Succeeded by Brad Boyes
