= Forgie =

Forgie is a surname. Notable people with the surname include:

- George Forgie (born 1948), Canadian ice hockey player
- James Forgie (1889–1969), Canadian federal politician
- Jenn Forgie (born 1969), Canadian actress and singer
- Robert Forgie (17th century), Anglican priest in Ireland
