= List of Detroit Red Wings draft picks =

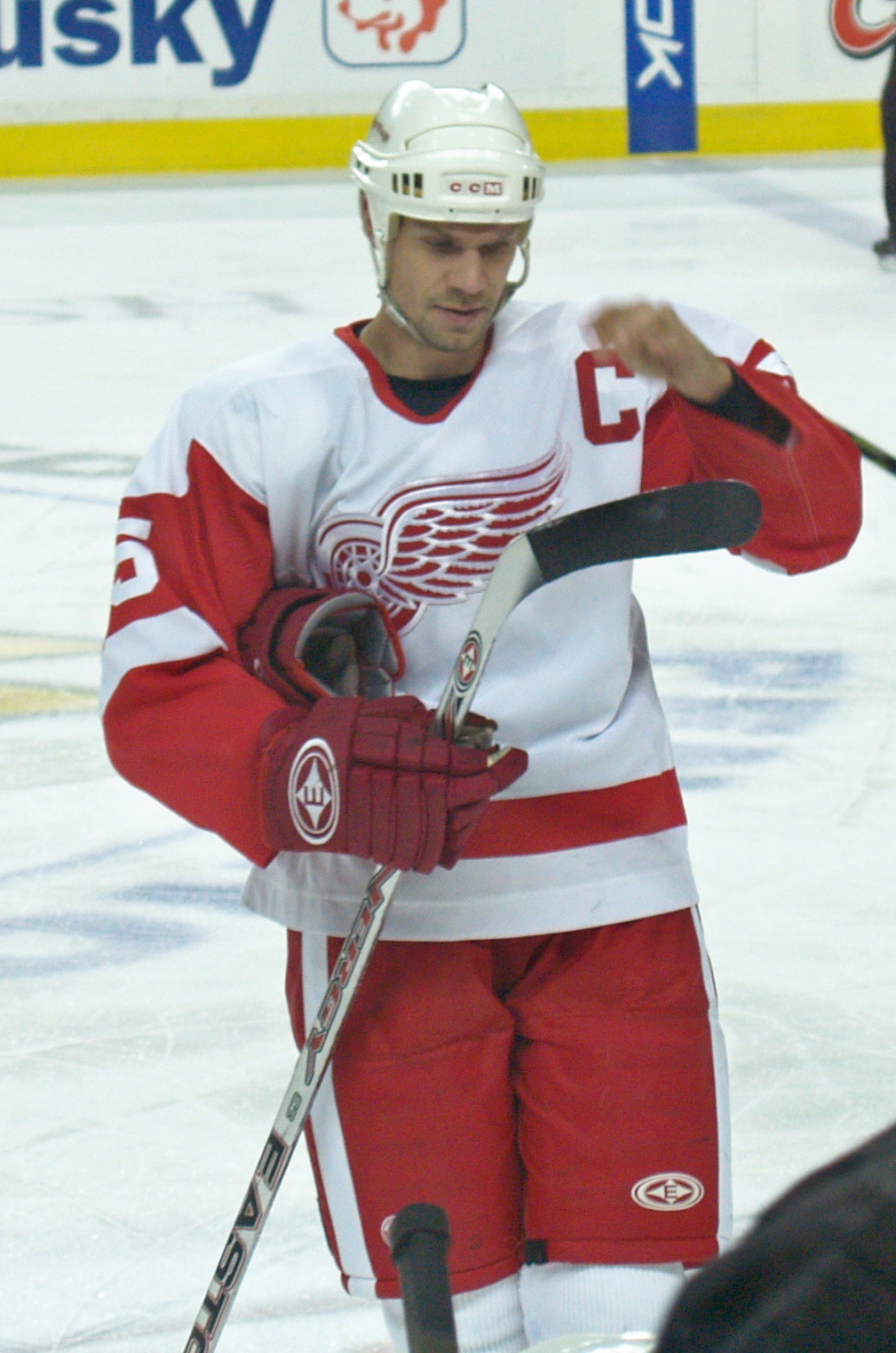
Nicklas Lidstrom was Detroit's third choice in the 1989 NHL entry draft.

The Detroit Red Wings are a professional ice hockey team based in Detroit, Michigan. They are members of the Atlantic Division in the Eastern Conference of the National Hockey League (NHL) and are one of the Original Six teams of the league. The Red Wings have participated in all 64 NHL entry drafts (where participating teams select newly eligible players in a predefined order) as well as six supplemental drafts and have drafted 573 players.

The NHL Entry Draft is held each June, allowing teams to select players who have turned 18 years old by September 15 in the year the draft is held. The draft order is determined by the previous season's order of finish, with non-playoff teams drafting first, followed by the teams that made the playoffs, with the specific order determined by the number of points earned by each team. The NHL holds a weighted lottery for the 14 non-playoff teams, allowing the winner to move up to the first overall pick. The team with the fewest points has the best chance of winning the lottery, with each successive team given a lower chance of moving up in the draft. Between 1986 and 1994, the NHL also held a Supplemental Draft for players in American colleges. Detroit's first draft pick was Peter Mahovlich, taken second overall in the 1963 NHL Amateur Draft. The Red Wings have chosen first overall three times, selecting Claude Gauthier in 1964, Dale McCourt in 1977, and Joe Murphy in 1986. McCourt and Murphy both spent some time in the NHL with Detroit, but Gauthier never played in the league. Twelve picks went on to play over 1,000 NHL games, while two of these, Nicklas Lidstrom and Steve Yzerman, played in over 1,500 games, both spending their entire NHL careers in Detroit.

Four players drafted by Detroit (Marcel Dionne, Sergei Fedorov, Lidstrom, and Yzerman) have gone on to be inducted into the Hockey Hall of Fame. Yzerman won the Stanley Cup four times with Detroit, three times as a player and once as an executive, and is currently the general manager of the Red Wings.

The 1989 Draft has been noted as having been exceptionally successful for Detroit. While team executive Jim Devellano stated the team would be satisfied with two players from that draft making it to the NHL, seven of them did so. Those seven players (Mike Sillinger, Bob Boughner, Lidstrom, Fedorov, Shawn McCosh, Dallas Drake and Vladimir Konstantinov) amassed 5,995 games played, 1,227 goals, 2,367 assists, 3,594 points and 5,108 penalties in minutes. That draft has also been marked as signalling a paradigm shift for Detroit as prior to that the club was very reluctant to draft players from outside North America. Since then the club has drafted a large number of European as well as other non-North American players. In 2000, for example, they drafted four Swedes, three Russians, two Canadians, one Slovak and one American.

== Key ==
Played at least one game with the Red Wings
Spent entire NHL career with the Red Wings

General terms and abbreviations
| Term or abbreviation | Definition |
|---|---|
| Draft | The year that the player was selected |
| Round | The round of the draft in which the player was selected |
| Pick | The overall position in the draft at which the player was selected |
| Ref(s) | Reference(s) |
| S | Supplemental draft selection |

Position abbreviations
| Abbreviation | Definition |
|---|---|
| D | Defenseman |
| LW | Left wing |
| C | Center |
| RW | Right wing |
| F | Forward |

Abbreviations for statistical columns
| Abbreviation | Definition |
|---|---|
| Pos | Position |
| GP | Games played |
| G | Goals |
| A | Assists |
| Pts | Points |
| PIM | Penalties in minutes |
| W | Wins |
| L | Losses |
| T | Ties |
| OT | Overtime/shootout losses |
| GAA | Goals against average |
| — | Does not apply |

Statistics are complete as of the 2025–26 NHL season.

== Goaltenders ==
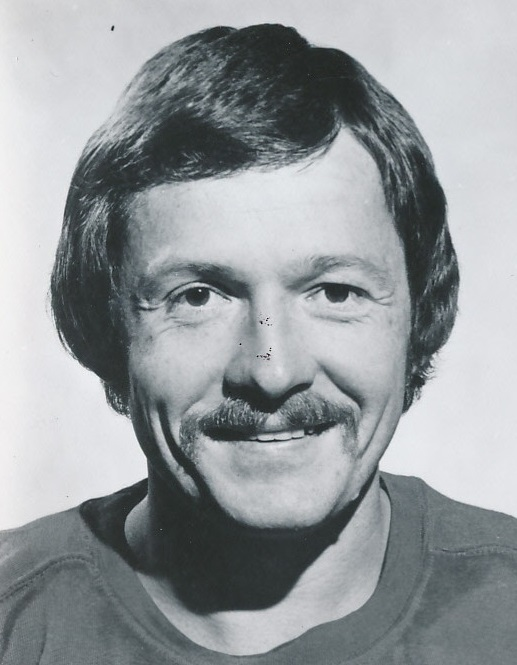
Jim Rutherford was Detroit's first choice in the 1969 NHL Draft.

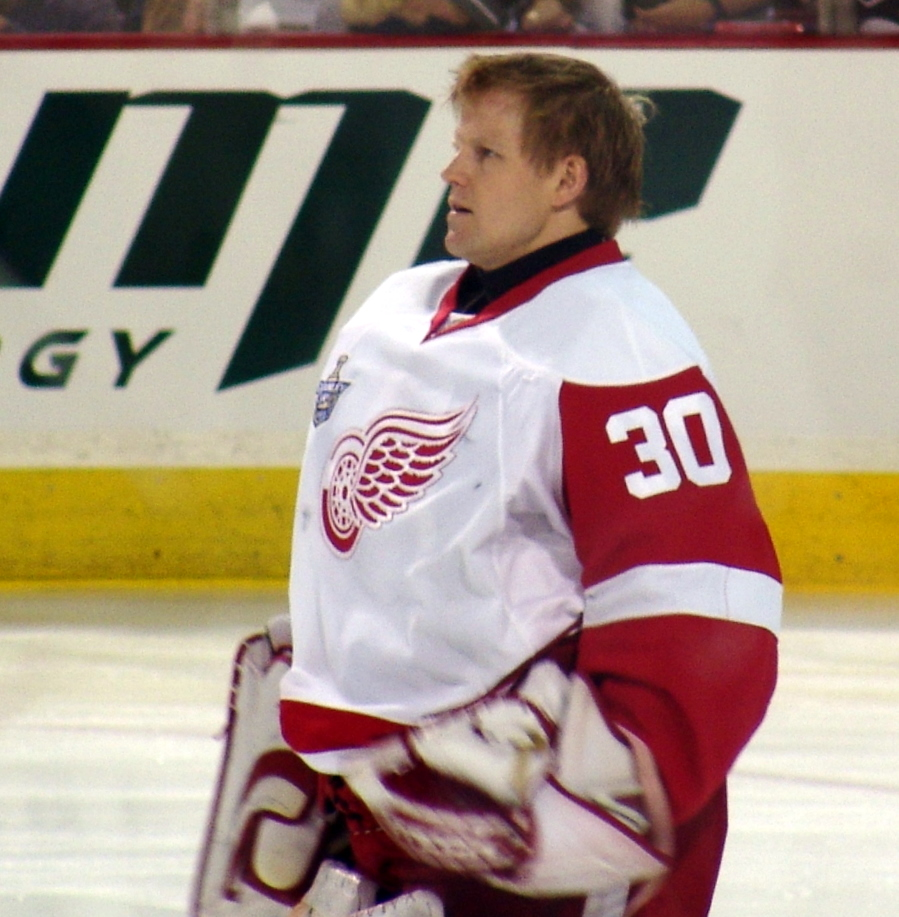
Chris Osgood was Detroit's third round choice in the 1991 NHL Draft.

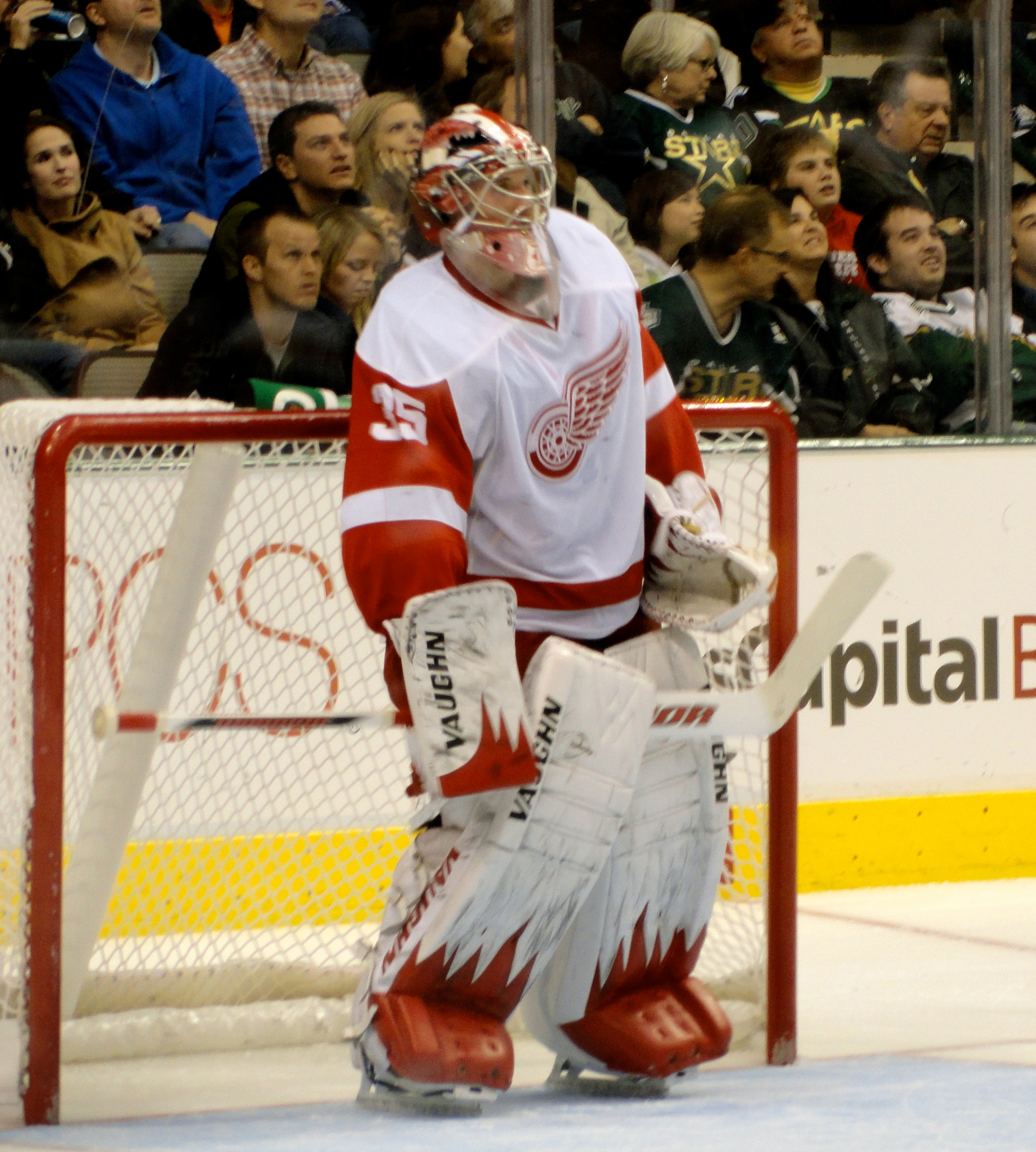
Jimmy Howard was chosen in the 2003 NHL Draft.

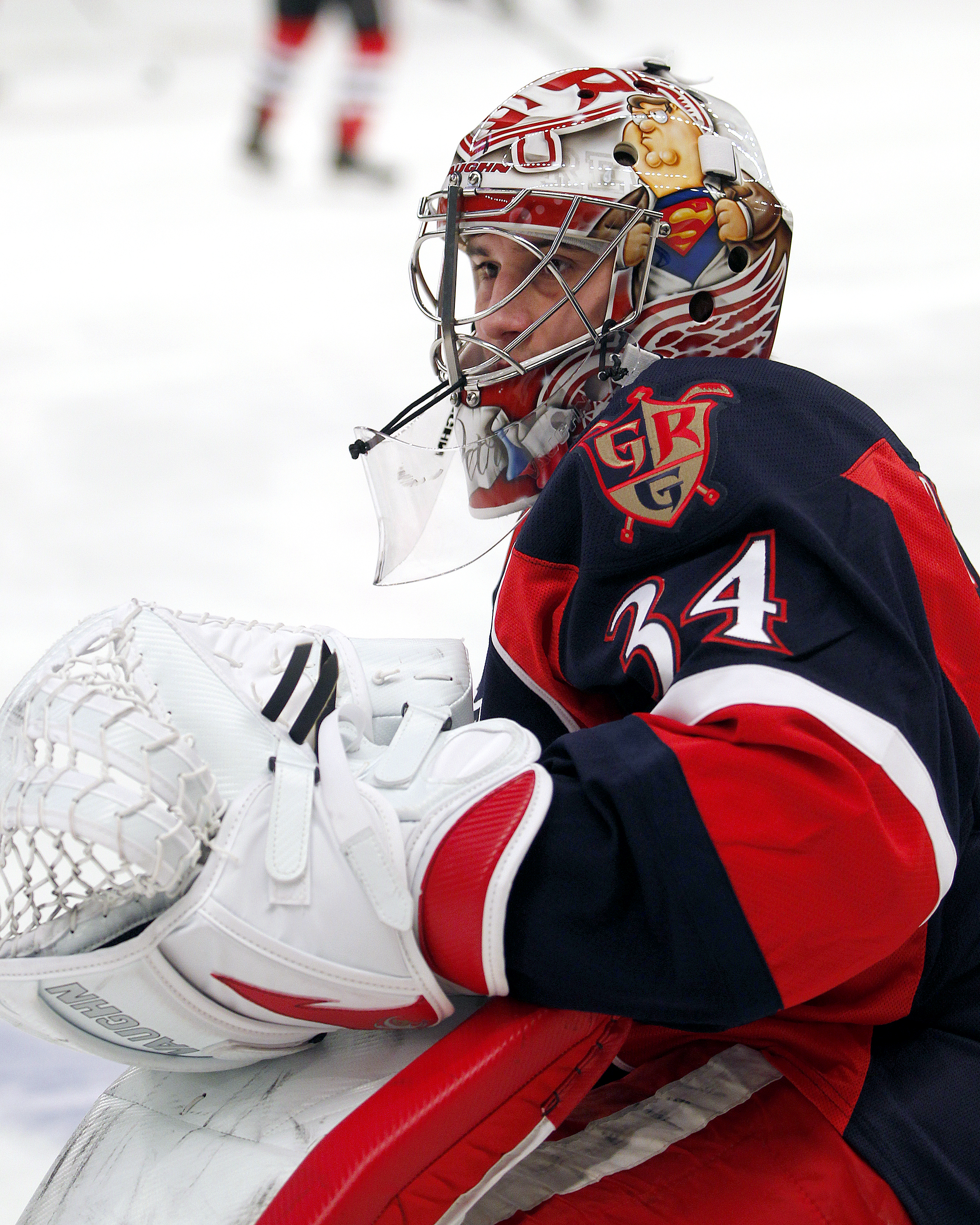
Petr Mrazek was taken in the fifth round of the 2010 NHL Draft.

Detroit has drafted 54 goaltenders, 17 of whom have appeared in the NHL. The first goaltender drafted by Detroit to appear in the league was Jim Rutherford; he played in 457 games with the Red Wings, the Pittsburgh Penguins, the Toronto Maple Leafs, and the Los Angeles Kings. Rutherford has since served as the general manager (GM) of the Hartford Whalers/Carolina Hurricanes and the Penguins. Chris Osgood has the most games played, wins, and ties of any goaltender drafted by the Wings, while Rutherford has the most career losses. Jimmy Howard has the most career overtime losses of any player on the list, while Mrázek has the lowest goals against average.

List of all goaltenders drafted by the Detroit Red Wings and their statistical accomplishments
| Draft | Round | Pick | Player | Nationality | GP | W | L | T | OT | GAA | Ref(s) |
|---|---|---|---|---|---|---|---|---|---|---|---|
| 1966 | 4 | 24 | Grant Cole | Canada | — | — | — | — | — | — | |
| 1969 | 1 | 10 | Jim Rutherford | Canada | 457 | 151 | 227 | 59 | — | 3.65 | |
| 1971 | 4 | 44 | George Hulme | Canada | — | — | — | — | — | — | |
| 1972 | 7 | 106 | Glen Seperich | Canada | — | — | — | — | — | — | |
| 1973 | 1 | 11 | Terry Richardson | Canada | 20 | 3 | 11 | 0 | — | 5.63 | |
| 1973 | 10 | 151 | Kevin Neville | Canada | — | — | — | — | — | — | |
| 1976 | 8 | 120 | Claude Legris | Canada | 4 | 0 | 1 | 1 | — | 2.64 | |
| 1977 | 6 | 91 | Jim Baxter | Canada | — | — | — | — | — | — | |
| 1978 | 2 | 31 | Al Jensen | Canada | 179 | 95 | 53 | 18 | — | 3.35 | |
| 1978 | 14 | 219 | Larry Lozinski | Canada | 30 | 6 | 11 | 7 | — | 4.32 | |
| 1981 | 3 | 44 | Corrado Micalef | Canada | 113 | 26 | 59 | 15 | — | 4.24 | |
| 1981 | 7 | 128 | Greg Stefan | Canada | 299 | 115 | 127 | 30 | — | 3.92 | |
| 1983 | 6 | 106 | Chris Pusey | Canada | 1 | 0 | 0 | 0 | — | 4.50 | |
| 1984 | 6 | 112 | Randy Hansch | Canada | — | — | — | — | — | — | |
| 1985 | 4 | 71 | Mark Gowens | Canada | — | — | — | — | — | — | |
| 1986 | 4 | 64 | Tim Cheveldae | Canada | 340 | 149 | 136 | 37 | — | 3.49 | |
| 1986 | 10 | 190 | Scott King | Canada | 2 | 0 | 0 | 0 | — | 2.95 | |
| 1987 | 4 | 74 | Mark Reimer | Canada | — | — | — | — | — | — | |
| 1989 | 12 | 246 | Jason Glickman | United States | — | — | — | — | — | — | |
| 1991 | 3 | 54 | Chris Osgood | Canada | 744 | 401 | 216 | 66 | 29 | 2.49 | |
| 1992 | 7 | 166 | Greg Scott | Canada | — | — | — | — | — | — | |
| 1992 | 8 | 189 | C. J. Denomme | Canada | — | — | — | — | — | — | |
| 1992 | 11 | 262 | Ryan Bach | Canada | 3 | 0 | 3 | 0 | — | 4.44 | |
| 1993 | 5 | 126 | Norm Maracle | Canada | 66 | 14 | 33 | 8 | — | 3.10 | |
| 1993 | 10 | 256 | Jamie Kosecki | United States | — | — | — | — | — | — | |
| 1994 | 5 | 114 | Frederic Deschenes | Canada | — | — | — | — | — | — | |
| 1994 | 8 | 205 | Jason Elliott | Canada | — | — | — | — | — | — | |
| 1995 | 5 | 126 | Dave Arsenault | Canada | — | — | — | — | — | — | |
| 1996 | 2 | 52 | Aren Miller | Canada | — | — | — | — | — | — | |
| 1996 | 5 | 135 | Michal Podolka | Canada | — | — | — | — | — | — | |
| 1998 | 3 | 84 | Jake McCracken | Canada | — | — | — | — | — | — | |
| 2000 | 4 | 102 | Stefan Liv | Sweden | — | — | — | — | — | — | |
| 2001 | 4 | 121 | Drew MacIntyre | Canada | 6 | 0 | 2 | — | 0 | 2.41 | |
| 2001 | 6 | 195 | Nick Pannoni | United States | — | — | — | — | — | — | |
| 2002 | 5 | 166 | Logan Koopmans | Canada | — | — | — | — | — | — | |
| 2003 | 2 | 64 | Jimmy Howard | United States | 543 | 246 | 196 | — | 70 | 2.62 | |
| 2006 | 3 | 92 | Daniel Larsson | Sweden | — | — | — | — | — | — | |
| 2008 | 1 | 30 | Tom McCollum | United States | 3 | 1 | 0 | — | 0 | 2.96 | |
| 2010 | 5 | 141 | Petr Mrazek | Czech Republic | 429 | 181 | 176 | — | 40 | 2.85 | |
| 2012 | 3 | 80 | Jake Paterson | Canada | — | — | — | — | — | — | |
| 2014 | 5 | 136 | Chase Perry | United States | — | — | — | — | — | — | |
| 2015 | 4 | 110 | Joren van Pottelberghe | Switzerland | — | — | — | — | — | — | |
| 2016 | 6 | 167 | Filip Larsson | Sweden | — | — | — | — | — | — | |
| 2017 | 3 | 88 | Keith Petruzzelli | United States | — | — | — | — | — | — | |
| 2018 | 3 | 84 | Jesper Eliasson | Sweden | — | — | — | — | — | — | |
| 2018 | 6 | 150 | Victor Brattstrom | Sweden | — | — | — | — | — | — | |
| 2019 | 7 | 191 | Carter Gylander | Canada | — | — | — | — | — | — | |
| 2020 | 4 | 107 | Jan Bednář | Czech Republic | — | — | — | — | — | — | |
| 2021 | 1 | 15 | Sebastian Cossa | Canada | 5 | 3 | 1 | — | 0 | 3.19 | |
| 2023 | 2 | 41 | Trey Augustine | United States | — | — | — | — | — | — | |
| 2023 | 6 | 169 | Rudy Guimond | United States | — | — | — | — | — | — | |
| 2024 | 4 | 126 | Landon Miller | United States | — | — | — | — | — | — | |
| 2025 | 3 | 75 | Michal Pradel | Slovakia | — | — | — | — | — | — | |
| 2026 | 3 | 79 | Michal Oršulák | Czech Republic | — | — | — | — | — | — | |

== Skaters ==
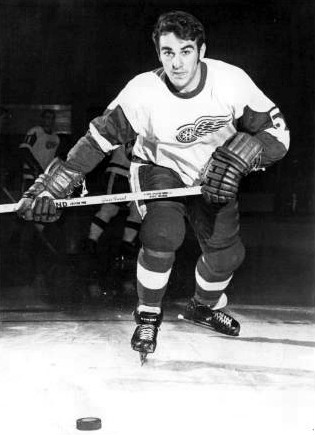
Detroit took Serge Lajeunesse in the first round of the 1970 NHL Amateur Draft.

Detroit has drafted 514 skaters (defensemen and forwards), 174 of whom have appeared in the NHL. Peter Mahovlich, Detroit's first pick, was also the first pick by the team to play in the NHL. Mahovlich played in 884 games for the Wings, the Montreal Canadiens, and the Penguins. Nicklas Lidstrom and Steve Yzerman are the only two picks to have played in over 1,500 games. Both Lidstrom and Yzerman spent their entire careers in Detroit, had their numbers retired by the team, and were inducted into the Hockey Hall of Fame. Marcel Dionne scored the most goals and points of any player drafted into the league by Detroit, while Yzerman has the most assists. Dionne and Yzerman are the only players drafted by the Wings to have scored at least 600 goals, 1,000 assists, and/or 1,700 points. Bob Probert accumulated the most penalty minutes, with 3,300.

List of all skaters drafted by the Detroit Red Wings and their statistical accomplishments
| Draft | Round | Pick | Player | Nationality | Pos | GP | G | A | Pts | PIM | Ref(s) |
|---|---|---|---|---|---|---|---|---|---|---|---|
| 1963 | 1 | 2 | Peter Mahovlich | Canada | C | 884 | 288 | 485 | 773 | 916 | |
| 1963 | 2 | 8 | Bill Cosburn | Canada | C | — | — | — | — | — | |
| 1964 | 1 | 1 | Claude Gauthier | Canada | RW | — | — | — | — | — | |
| 1964 | 2 | 7 | Brian Watts | Canada | LW | 4 | 0 | 0 | 0 | 0 | |
| 1964 | 3 | 13 | Ralph Buchanan | Canada | LW | — | — | — | — | — | |
| 1964 | 4 | 17 | Rene LeClerc | Canada | RW | 87 | 10 | 11 | 21 | 105 | |
| 1965 | 1 | 3 | George Forgie | Canada | D | — | — | — | — | — | |
| 1965 | 2 | 8 | Bob Birdsell | Canada | RW | — | — | — | — | — | |
| 1966 | 1 | 6 | Steve Atkinson | Canada | RW | 302 | 60 | 51 | 111 | 104 | |
| 1966 | 2 | 12 | Jim Whittaker | Canada | D | — | — | — | — | — | |
| 1966 | 3 | 18 | Lee Carpenter | Canada | D | — | — | — | — | — | |
| 1967 | 1 | 9 | Ron Barkwell | Canada | C | — | — | — | — | — | |
| 1967 | 2 | 17 | Al Karlander | Canada | C | 212 | 36 | 56 | 92 | 70 | |
| 1968 | 1 | 11 | Steve Andrascik | Canada | RW | — | — | — | — | — | |
| 1968 | 2 | 17 | Herb Boxer | United States | RW | — | — | — | — | — | |
| 1969 | 2 | 21 | Ron Garwasiuk | Canada | LW | — | — | — | — | — | |
| 1969 | 3 | 33 | Wayne Hawrysh | Canada | RW | — | — | — | — | — | |
| 1969 | 4 | 45 | Wayne Chernecki | Canada | C | — | — | — | — | — | |
| 1969 | 5 | 57 | Wally Olds | United States | D | — | — | — | — | — | |
| 1970 | 1 | 12 | Serge Lajeunesse | Canada | D | 103 | 1 | 4 | 5 | 103 | |
| 1970 | 2 | 26 | Robert Guindon | Canada | LW | 6 | 0 | 1 | 1 | 0 | |
| 1970 | 3 | 40 | Yvon Lambert | Canada | LW | 683 | 206 | 273 | 479 | 340 | |
| 1970 | 4 | 54 | Tom Johnston | Canada | RW | — | — | — | — | — | |
| 1970 | 5 | 68 | Tom Mellor | United States | D | 26 | 2 | 4 | 6 | 25 | |
| 1970 | 6 | 81 | Bernie MacNeil | Canada | LW | 4 | 0 | 0 | 0 | 0 | |
| 1970 | 7 | 95 | Ed Hays | Canada | C | — | — | — | — | — | |
| 1971 | 1 | 2 | Marcel Dionne | Canada | C | 1348 | 731 | 1040 | 1771 | 600 | |
| 1971 | 2 | 16 | Henry Boucha | United States | C | 247 | 53 | 49 | 102 | 157 | |
| 1971 | 5 | 58 | Earl Anderson | United States | RW | 109 | 19 | 19 | 38 | 22 | |
| 1971 | 6 | 72 | Charlie Shaw | Canada | D | — | — | — | — | — | |
| 1971 | 7 | 86 | Jim Nahrgang | Canada | D | 57 | 5 | 12 | 17 | 34 | |
| 1971 | 8 | 100 | Bob Boyd | Canada | D | — | — | — | — | — | |
| 1972 | 2 | 26 | Pierre Guite | Canada | LW | — | — | — | — | — | |
| 1972 | 3 | 42 | Bob Krieger | United States | C | — | — | — | — | — | |
| 1972 | 4 | 58 | Danny Gruen | Canada | LW | 49 | 9 | 13 | 22 | 19 | |
| 1972 | 5 | 74 | Dennis Johnson | United States | LW | — | — | — | — | — | |
| 1972 | 6 | 90 | Bill Miller | Canada | D | — | — | — | — | — | |
| 1972 | 8 | 122 | Mike Ford | Canada | D | — | — | — | — | — | |
| 1972 | 9 | 138 | George Kuzmicz | Canada | D | — | — | — | — | — | |
| 1972 | 10 | 150 | Dave Arundel | United States | D | — | — | — | — | — | |
| 1973 | 3 | 39 | Nelson Pyatt | Canada | C | 296 | 71 | 63 | 134 | 69 | |
| 1973 | 3 | 43 | Robbie Neale | Canada | C | — | — | — | — | — | |
| 1973 | 4 | 59 | Mike Korney | Canada | D | 77 | 9 | 10 | 19 | 59 | |
| 1973 | 5 | 75 | Blair Stewart | Canada | C | 229 | 34 | 44 | 78 | 326 | |
| 1973 | 6 | 91 | Glenn Cickello | Canada | D | — | — | — | — | — | |
| 1973 | 7 | 107 | Brian Middleton | Canada | D | — | — | — | — | — | |
| 1973 | 8 | 118 | Dennis Polonich | Canada | C | 390 | 59 | 82 | 141 | 1242 | |
| 1973 | 8 | 123 | George Lyle | Canada | LW | 99 | 24 | 38 | 62 | 51 | |
| 1973 | 9 | 135 | Dennis O'Brien | Canada | D | — | — | — | — | — | |
| 1973 | 9 | 138 | Tom Newman | Canada | D | — | — | — | — | — | |
| 1973 | 9 | 139 | Ray Bibeau | Canada | D | — | — | — | — | — | |
| 1973 | 10 | 154 | Ken Gibb | Canada | D | — | — | — | — | — | |
| 1973 | 10 | 155 | Mitch Brandt | United States | D | — | — | — | — | — | |
| 1974 | 1 | 9 | Bill Lochead | Canada | LW | 330 | 69 | 62 | 131 | 180 | |
| 1974 | 3 | 44 | Dan Mandryk | Canada | LW | — | — | — | — | — | |
| 1974 | 3 | 45 | Bill Evo | United States | RW | — | — | — | — | — | |
| 1974 | 4 | 63 | Michel Bergeron | Canada | RW | 229 | 80 | 58 | 138 | 165 | |
| 1974 | 5 | 81 | John Taft | United States | D | 15 | 0 | 2 | 2 | 4 | |
| 1974 | 6 | 99 | Don Dufek | United States | LW | — | — | — | — | — | |
| 1974 | 7 | 117 | Jack Carlson | United States | LW | 236 | 30 | 15 | 45 | 417 | |
| 1974 | 8 | 134 | Greg Steel | Canada | D | — | — | — | — | — | |
| 1974 | 9 | 151 | Glen McLeod | Canada | D | — | — | — | — | — | |
| 1975 | 1 | 5 | Rick Lapointe | Canada | D | 664 | 44 | 176 | 220 | 831 | |
| 1975 | 2 | 23 | Jerry Rollins | Canada | D | — | — | — | — | — | |
| 1975 | 3 | 37 | Al Cameron | Canada | D | 282 | 11 | 44 | 55 | 356 | |
| 1975 | 3 | 45 | Blair Davidson | Canada | D | — | — | — | — | — | |
| 1975 | 3 | 50 | Clark Hamilton | Canada | LW | — | — | — | — | — | |
| 1975 | 4 | 59 | Mike Wirachowsky | Canada | D | — | — | — | — | — | |
| 1975 | 5 | 77 | Mike Wong | United States | C | 22 | 1 | 1 | 2 | 12 | |
| 1975 | 6 | 95 | Mike Harazny | Canada | D | — | — | — | — | — | |
| 1975 | 7 | 113 | Jean-Luc Phaneuf | Canada | C | — | — | — | — | — | |
| 1975 | 8 | 131 | Steve Carlson | United States | C | 52 | 9 | 12 | 21 | 23 | |
| 1975 | 9 | 148 | Gary Vaughan | Canada | RW | — | — | — | — | — | |
| 1975 | 10 | 164 | Jean Thibodeau | Canada | C | — | — | — | — | — | |
| 1975 | 11 | 176 | Dave Hanson | United States | D | — | — | — | — | — | |
| 1975 | 11 | 178 | Rob Larson | United States | D | — | — | — | — | — | |
| 1976 | 1 | 4 | Fred Williams | Canada | C | 44 | 2 | 5 | 7 | 10 | |
| 1976 | 2 | 22 | Reed Larson | United States | D | 904 | 222 | 463 | 685 | 1391 | |
| 1976 | 3 | 40 | Fred Berry | Canada | C | 3 | 0 | 0 | 0 | 0 | |
| 1976 | 4 | 58 | Kevin Schamehorn | Canada | RW | 10 | 0 | 0 | 0 | 17 | |
| 1976 | 5 | 76 | Dwight Schofield | United States | D | 211 | 8 | 22 | 30 | 631 | |
| 1976 | 6 | 94 | Tony Horvath | Canada | D | — | — | — | — | — | |
| 1976 | 7 | 111 | Fern LeBlanc | Canada | C | 34 | 5 | 6 | 11 | 0 | |
| 1977 | 1 | 1 | Dale McCourt | Canada | C | 532 | 194 | 284 | 478 | 124 | |
| 1977 | 3 | 37 | Rick Vasko | Canada | D | 31 | 3 | 7 | 10 | 29 | |
| 1977 | 4 | 55 | John Hilworth | Canada | D | 57 | 1 | 1 | 2 | 89 | |
| 1977 | 5 | 73 | Jim Korn | Canada | D | 596 | 66 | 122 | 188 | 1801 | |
| 1977 | 7 | 109 | Randy Wilson | United States | LW | — | — | — | — | — | |
| 1977 | 8 | 125 | Ray Roy | United States | C | — | — | — | — | — | |
| 1977 | 9 | 141 | Kip Churchill | Canada | C | — | — | — | — | — | |
| 1977 | 10 | 155 | Lance Gatoni | Canada | D | — | — | — | — | — | |
| 1977 | 11 | 163 | Robert Plumb | Canada | LW | 14 | 3 | 2 | 5 | 2 | |
| 1977 | 12 | 170 | Alain Belanger | Canada | LW | — | — | — | — | — | |
| 1977 | 13 | 175 | Dean Willers | England | LW | — | — | — | — | — | |
| 1977 | 14 | 178 | Roland Cloutier | Canada | C | 34 | 8 | 9 | 17 | 2 | |
| 1977 | 15 | 181 | Ed Hill | United States | RW | — | — | — | — | — | |
| 1977 | 16 | 184 | Val James | United States | LW | 11 | 0 | 0 | 0 | 30 | |
| 1977 | 17 | 185 | Grant Morin | Canada | RW | — | — | — | — | — | |
| 1978 | 1 | 9 | Willie Huber | Canada | D | 655 | 104 | 217 | 321 | 950 | |
| 1978 | 1 | 12 | Brent Peterson | Canada | C | 620 | 72 | 141 | 213 | 484 | |
| 1978 | 2 | 28 | Glenn Hicks | Canada | LW | 108 | 6 | 12 | 18 | 127 | |
| 1978 | 3 | 53 | Doug Derkson | Canada | C | — | — | — | — | — | |
| 1978 | 4 | 62 | Bjorn Skaare | Norway | C | 1 | 0 | 0 | 0 | 0 | |
| 1978 | 5 | 78 | Ted Nolan | Canada | C | 78 | 6 | 16 | 22 | 105 | |
| 1978 | 6 | 95 | Sylvain Locas | Canada | C | — | — | — | — | — | |
| 1978 | 7 | 112 | Wes George | Canada | LW | — | — | — | — | — | |
| 1978 | 8 | 129 | John Barrett | Canada | D | 488 | 20 | 77 | 97 | 604 | |
| 1978 | 9 | 146 | Jim Malazdrewicz | Canada | LW | — | — | — | — | — | |
| 1978 | 10 | 163 | Geoff Shaw | Canada | RW | — | — | — | — | — | |
| 1978 | 11 | 178 | Carl Van Harrewyn | Canada | D | — | — | — | — | — | |
| 1978 | 12 | 194 | Ladislav Svozil | Czechoslovakia | LW | — | — | — | — | — | |
| 1978 | 13 | 208 | Tom Bailey | Canada | RW | — | — | — | — | — | |
| 1978 | 15 | 224 | Randy Betty | Canada | LW | — | — | — | — | — | |
| 1978 | 16 | 226 | Brian Crawley | Canada | D | — | — | — | — | — | |
| 1978 | 17 | 228 | Doug Feasby | Canada | C | — | — | — | — | — | |
| 1979 | 1 | 3 | Mike Foligno | Canada | RW | 1018 | 355 | 372 | 727 | 2049 | |
| 1979 | 3 | 45 | Jody Gage | Canada | RW | 68 | 14 | 15 | 29 | 26 | |
| 1979 | 3 | 46 | Boris Fistric | Canada | D | — | — | — | — | — | |
| 1979 | 4 | 66 | John Ogrodnick | Canada | RW | 928 | 402 | 425 | 827 | 260 | |
| 1979 | 5 | 87 | Joe Paterson | Canada | LW | 291 | 19 | 37 | 56 | 831 | |
| 1979 | 6 | 108 | Carmine Cirella | Canada | LW | — | — | — | — | — | |
| 1980 | 1 | 11 | Mike Blaisdell | Canada | RW | 343 | 70 | 84 | 154 | 166 | |
| 1980 | 3 | 46 | Mark Osborne | Canada | LW | 919 | 212 | 319 | 531 | 1152 | |
| 1980 | 5 | 88 | Mike Corrigan | Canada | RW | — | — | — | — | — | |
| 1980 | 6 | 109 | Wayne Crawford | Canada | C | — | — | — | — | — | |
| 1980 | 7 | 130 | Mike Braun | Canada | D | — | — | — | — | — | |
| 1980 | 8 | 151 | John Beukeboom | Canada | D | — | — | — | — | — | |
| 1980 | 9 | 172 | Dave Miles | Canada | RW | — | — | — | — | — | |
| 1980 | 10 | 193 | Brian Rorabeck | Canada | RW | — | — | — | — | — | |
| 1981 | 2 | 23 | Claude Loiselle | Canada | C | 616 | 92 | 117 | 209 | 1146 | |
| 1981 | 5 | 86 | Larry Trader | Canada | D | 91 | 5 | 13 | 18 | 74 | |
| 1981 | 6 | 107 | Gerard Gallant | Canada | LW | 615 | 211 | 269 | 480 | 1674 | |
| 1981 | 8 | 149 | Rick Zombo | United States | D | 652 | 24 | 130 | 154 | 728 | |
| 1981 | 9 | 170 | Don LeBlanc | Canada | LW | — | — | — | — | — | |
| 1981 | 10 | 191 | Robert Nordmark | Sweden | D | 236 | 13 | 70 | 83 | 254 | |
| 1982 | 1 | 17 | Murray Craven | Canada | C | 1071 | 266 | 493 | 759 | 524 | |
| 1982 | 2 | 23 | Yves Courteau | Canada | RW | 22 | 2 | 5 | 7 | 4 | |
| 1982 | 3 | 44 | Carmine Vani | Canada | LW | — | — | — | — | — | |
| 1982 | 4 | 66 | Craig Coxe | United States | C | 235 | 14 | 31 | 45 | 713 | |
| 1982 | 5 | 86 | Brad Shaw | Canada | D | 377 | 22 | 137 | 159 | 208 | |
| 1982 | 6 | 107 | Claude Vilgrain | Canada | C | 89 | 21 | 32 | 53 | 78 | |
| 1982 | 7 | 128 | Greg Hudas | United States | D | — | — | — | — | — | |
| 1982 | 8 | 149 | Pat Lahey | Canada | C | — | — | — | — | — | |
| 1982 | 9 | 170 | Gary Cullen | Canada | C | — | — | — | — | — | |
| 1982 | 10 | 191 | Brent Meckling | Canada | D | — | — | — | — | — | |
| 1982 | 11 | 212 | Mike Stern | Canada | LW | — | — | — | — | — | |
| 1982 | 12 | 233 | Shaun Reagan | Canada | RW | — | — | — | — | — | |
| 1983 | 1 | 4 | Steve Yzerman | Canada | C | 1514 | 692 | 1063 | 1755 | 924 | |
| 1983 | 2 | 25 | Lane Lambert | Canada | RW | 283 | 58 | 65 | 123 | 521 | |
| 1983 | 3 | 46 | Bob Probert | Canada | LW | 935 | 162 | 221 | 384 | 3300 | |
| 1983 | 4 | 68 | Dave Korol | Canada | D | — | — | — | — | — | |
| 1983 | 5 | 86 | Petr Klima | Czechoslovakia | LW | 786 | 313 | 260 | 573 | 671 | |
| 1983 | 5 | 88 | Joe Kocur | Canada | RW | 821 | 80 | 82 | 162 | 2519 | |
| 1983 | 7 | 126 | Bob Pierson | Canada | LW | — | — | — | — | — | |
| 1983 | 8 | 146 | Craig Butz | Canada | D | — | — | — | — | — | |
| 1983 | 9 | 166 | Dave Sikorski | United States | D | — | — | — | — | — | |
| 1983 | 10 | 186 | Stu Grimson | Canada | LW | 729 | 17 | 22 | 39 | 2113 | |
| 1983 | 11 | 206 | Jeff Frank | United States | RW | — | — | — | — | — | |
| 1983 | 12 | 226 | Chuck Chiatto | United States | C | — | — | — | — | — | |
| 1984 | 1 | 7 | Shawn Burr | Canada | C | 878 | 181 | 259 | 440 | 1069 | |
| 1984 | 2 | 28 | Doug Houda | Canada | D | 561 | 19 | 63 | 82 | 1104 | |
| 1984 | 3 | 49 | Milan Chalupa | Czechoslovakia | D | 14 | 0 | 5 | 5 | 6 | |
| 1984 | 5 | 91 | Mats Lundstrom | Sweden | LW | — | — | — | — | — | |
| 1984 | 7 | 133 | Stefan Larsson | Sweden | D | — | — | — | — | — | |
| 1984 | 8 | 152 | Lars Karlsson | Sweden | LW | — | — | — | — | — | |
| 1984 | 8 | 154 | Urban Nordin | Sweden | C | — | — | — | — | — | |
| 1984 | 9 | 175 | Bill Shibicky | Canada | C | — | — | — | — | — | |
| 1984 | 10 | 195 | Jay Rose | United States | D | — | — | — | — | — | |
| 1984 | 11 | 216 | Tim Kaiser | Canada | RW | — | — | — | — | — | |
| 1984 | 12 | 236 | Tom Nickolau | Canada | C | — | — | — | — | — | |
| 1985 | 1 | 8 | Brent Fedyk | Canada | RW | 470 | 97 | 112 | 209 | 308 | |
| 1985 | 2 | 29 | Jeff Sharples | Canada | D | 105 | 14 | 35 | 49 | 70 | |
| 1985 | 3 | 50 | Steve Chiasson | Canada | D | 751 | 93 | 305 | 398 | 1107 | |
| 1985 | 5 | 92 | Chris Luongo | United States | D | 218 | 8 | 23 | 31 | 176 | |
| 1985 | 6 | 113 | Randy McKay | Canada | RW | 932 | 162 | 201 | 363 | 1731 | |
| 1985 | 7 | 134 | Thomas Bjuhr | Sweden | LW | — | — | — | — | — | |
| 1985 | 8 | 155 | Mike Luckraft | United States | D | — | — | — | — | — | |
| 1985 | 9 | 176 | Rob Schena | United States | D | — | — | — | — | — | |
| 1985 | 10 | 197 | Erik Hamalainen | Finland | D | — | — | — | — | — | |
| 1985 | 11 | 218 | Bo Svanberg | Sweden | C | — | — | — | — | — | |
| 1985 | 12 | 239 | Mikael Lindman | Sweden | D | — | — | — | — | — | |
| 1986 | 1 | 1 | Joe Murphy | Canada | RW | 779 | 233 | 295 | 528 | 810 | |
| 1986 | 2 | 22 | Adam Graves | Canada | LW | 1152 | 329 | 287 | 616 | 1224 | |
| 1986 | 3 | 43 | Derek Mayer | Canada | D | 17 | 2 | 2 | 4 | 4 | |
| 1986 | 5 | 85 | Johan Garpenlov | Sweden | LW | 609 | 114 | 197 | 311 | 276 | |
| 1986 | 6 | 106 | Jay Stark | Canada | D | — | — | — | — | — | |
| 1986 | 7 | 127 | Par Djoos | Sweden | D | 82 | 2 | 31 | 33 | 58 | |
| 1986 | 8 | 148 | Dean Morton | Canada | D | 1 | 1 | 0 | 1 | 2 | |
| 1986 | 9 | 169 | Marc Potvin | Canada | RW | 121 | 3 | 5 | 8 | 456 | |
| 1986 | 11 | 211 | Tom Bissett | United States | LW | 5 | 0 | 0 | 0 | 0 | |
| 1986 | 12 | 232 | Peter Ekroth | Sweden | D | — | — | — | — | — | |
| 1986 | S | 5 | Rob Doyle | Canada | D | — | — | — | — | — | |
| 1987 | 1 | 11 | Yves Racine | Canada | D | 508 | 37 | 194 | 231 | 439 | |
| 1987 | 2 | 32 | Gord Kruppke | Canada | D | 23 | 0 | 0 | 0 | 32 | |
| 1987 | 2 | 41 | Bob Wilkie | Canada | D | 18 | 2 | 5 | 7 | 10 | |
| 1987 | 3 | 52 | Dennis Holland | Canada | C | — | — | — | — | — | |
| 1987 | 5 | 95 | Radomir Brazda | Czechoslovakia | D | — | — | — | — | — | |
| 1987 | 6 | 116 | Sean Clifford | Canada | D | — | — | — | — | — | |
| 1987 | 7 | 137 | Mike Gober | United States | LW | — | — | — | — | — | |
| 1987 | 8 | 158 | Kevin Scott | Canada | LW | — | — | — | — | — | |
| 1987 | 9 | 179 | Mikko Haapakoski | Finland | D | — | — | — | — | — | |
| 1987 | 10 | 200 | Darin Banister | Canada | D | — | — | — | — | — | |
| 1987 | 11 | 221 | Craig Quinlan | United States | D | — | — | — | — | — | |
| 1987 | 12 | 242 | Tomas Jansson | Sweden | D | — | — | — | — | — | |
| 1987 | S | 13 | Mike LaMoine | United States | D | — | — | — | — | — | |
| 1988 | 1 | 17 | Kory Kocur | Canada | RW | — | — | — | — | — | |
| 1988 | 2 | 38 | Serge Anglehart | Canada | D | — | — | — | — | — | |
| 1988 | 3 | 47 | Guy Dupuis | Canada | D | — | — | — | — | — | |
| 1988 | 3 | 59 | Petr Hrbek | Czechoslovakia | RW | — | — | — | — | — | |
| 1988 | 4 | 80 | Sheldon Kennedy | Canada | RW | 310 | 49 | 58 | 107 | 233 | |
| 1988 | 7 | 143 | Kelly Hurd | Canada | RW | — | — | — | — | — | |
| 1988 | 8 | 164 | Brian McCormack | United States | D | — | — | — | — | — | |
| 1988 | 9 | 185 | Jody Praznik | Canada | D | — | — | — | — | — | |
| 1988 | 10 | 206 | Glen Goodall | Canada | C | — | — | — | — | — | |
| 1988 | 11 | 227 | Darren Colbourne | Canada | RW | — | — | — | — | — | |
| 1988 | 12 | 248 | Don Stone | United States | C | — | — | — | — | — | |
| 1988 | S | 22 | Gary Shuchuk | Canada | C | 142 | 13 | 26 | 39 | 70 | |
| 1989 | 1 | 11 | Mike Sillinger | Canada | C | 1049 | 240 | 308 | 548 | 644 | |
| 1989 | 2 | 32 | Bob Boughner | Canada | D | 630 | 15 | 57 | 72 | 1382 | |
| 1989 | 3 | 53 | Nicklas Lidstrom | Sweden | D | 1564 | 264 | 878 | 1142 | 514 | |
| 1989 | 4 | 74 | Sergei Fedorov | Soviet Union | C | 1248 | 483 | 696 | 1179 | 839 | |
| 1989 | 5 | 95 | Shawn McCosh | Canada | C | 9 | 1 | 0 | 1 | 6 | |
| 1989 | 6 | 116 | Dallas Drake | Canada | RW | 1009 | 177 | 300 | 477 | 885 | |
| 1989 | 7 | 137 | Scott Zygulski | United States | D | — | — | — | — | — | |
| 1989 | 8 | 158 | Andy Suhy | United States | D | — | — | — | — | — | |
| 1989 | 9 | 179 | Bob Jones | Canada | D | — | — | — | — | — | |
| 1989 | 10 | 200 | Greg Bignell | Canada | D | — | — | — | — | — | |
| 1989 | 10 | 204 | Rick Judson | United States | LW | — | — | — | — | — | |
| 1989 | 11 | 221 | Vladimir Konstantinov | Soviet Union | D | 446 | 47 | 128 | 175 | 838 | |
| 1989 | 12 | 242 | Joe Frederick | United States | RW | — | — | — | — | — | |
| 1989 | S | 16 | Brad Kreick | United States | D | — | — | — | — | — | |
| 1990 | 1 | 3 | Keith Primeau | Canada | C | 909 | 266 | 353 | 619 | 1541 | |
| 1990 | 3 | 45 | Vyacheslav Kozlov | Soviet Union | C | 1182 | 356 | 497 | 853 | 704 | |
| 1990 | 4 | 66 | Stewart Malgunas | Canada | D | 129 | 1 | 5 | 6 | 144 | |
| 1990 | 5 | 87 | Tony Burns | United States | D | — | — | — | — | — | |
| 1990 | 6 | 108 | Claude Barthe | Canada | D | — | — | — | — | — | |
| 1990 | 7 | 129 | Jason York | Canada | D | 757 | 42 | 187 | 229 | 621 | |
| 1990 | 8 | 150 | Wes McCauley | Canada | D | — | — | — | — | — | |
| 1990 | 9 | 171 | Tony Gruba | United States | RW | — | — | — | — | — | |
| 1990 | 10 | 192 | Travis Tucker | Canada | D | — | — | — | — | — | |
| 1990 | 11 | 213 | Brett Larson | United States | D | — | — | — | — | — | |
| 1990 | 12 | 234 | John Hendry | Canada | LW | — | — | — | — | — | |
| 1990 | S | 3 | Mike Casselman | Canada | LW | 3 | 0 | 0 | 0 | 0 | |
| 1990 | S | 8 | Donny Oliver | Canada | LW | — | — | — | — | — | |
| 1991 | 1 | 10 | Martin Lapointe | Canada | RW | 991 | 181 | 200 | 381 | 1417 | |
| 1991 | 2 | 32 | Jamie Pushor | Canada | D | 521 | 14 | 46 | 60 | 648 | |
| 1991 | 4 | 76 | Mike Knuble | Canada | LW | 1040 | 274 | 266 | 540 | 621 | |
| 1991 | 5 | 98 | Dmitri Motkov | Soviet Union | D | — | — | — | — | — | |
| 1991 | 7 | 142 | Igor Malykhin | Russia | D | — | — | — | — | — | |
| 1991 | 9 | 186 | Jim Bermingham | Canada | C | — | — | — | — | — | |
| 1991 | 10 | 208 | Jason Firth | Canada | C | — | — | — | — | — | |
| 1991 | 11 | 230 | Bart Turner | United States | LW | — | — | — | — | — | |
| 1991 | 12 | 252 | Andrew Miller | Canada | RW | — | — | — | — | — | |
| 1991 | S | 16 | Kelly Sorensen | Canada | RW | — | — | — | — | — | |
| 1992 | 1 | 22 | Curtis Bowen | Canada | LW | — | — | — | — | — | |
| 1992 | 2 | 46 | Darren McCarty | Canada | LW | 758 | 127 | 161 | 288 | 1477 | |
| 1992 | 3 | 70 | Sylvain Cloutier | Canada | C | 7 | 0 | 0 | 0 | 0 | |
| 1992 | 5 | 118 | Mike Sullivan | United States | C | — | — | — | — | — | |
| 1992 | 6 | 142 | Jason MacDonald | Canada | RW | 4 | 0 | 0 | 0 | 19 | |
| 1992 | 8 | 183 | Justin Krall | United States | D | — | — | — | — | — | |
| 1992 | 9 | 214 | Jeff Walker | Canada | D | — | — | — | — | — | |
| 1992 | 10 | 238 | Dan McGillis | Canada | D | 634 | 56 | 182 | 238 | 570 | |
| 1993 | 1 | 22 | Anders Eriksson | Sweden | D | 572 | 22 | 154 | 176 | 242 | |
| 1993 | 2 | 48 | Jonathan Coleman | United States | D | — | — | — | — | — | |
| 1993 | 3 | 74 | Kevin Hilton | United States | C | — | — | — | — | — | |
| 1993 | 4 | 97 | John Jakopin | Canada | D | 113 | 1 | 6 | 7 | 145 | |
| 1993 | 4 | 100 | Benoit Larose | Canada | D | — | — | — | — | — | |
| 1993 | 6 | 152 | Tim Spitzig | Canada | RW | — | — | — | — | — | |
| 1993 | 7 | 178 | Yuri Yuresko | Russia | D | — | — | — | — | — | |
| 1993 | 8 | 204 | Vitezslav Skuta | Czech Republic | D | — | — | — | — | — | |
| 1993 | 9 | 230 | Ryan Shanahan | United States | RW | — | — | — | — | — | |
| 1993 | 11 | 282 | Gordy Hunt | United States | LW | — | — | — | — | — | |
| 1994 | 1 | 23 | Yan Golubovsky | Russia | D | 56 | 1 | 7 | 8 | 32 | |
| 1994 | 2 | 49 | Mathieu Dandenault | Canada | RW | 868 | 68 | 135 | 203 | 516 | |
| 1994 | 3 | 75 | Sean Gillam | Canada | D | — | — | — | — | — | |
| 1994 | 5 | 127 | Doug Battaglia | Canada | D | — | — | — | — | — | |
| 1994 | 6 | 153 | Pavel Agarkov | Russia | C | — | — | — | — | — | |
| 1994 | 9 | 231 | Jeff Mikesch | United States | C | — | — | — | — | — | |
| 1994 | 10 | 257 | Tomas Holmstrom | Sweden | LW | 1026 | 243 | 287 | 530 | 769 | |
| 1994 | 11 | 283 | Toivo Suursoo | Estonia | LW | — | — | — | — | — | |
| 1995 | 1 | 26 | Maxim Kuznetsov | Russia | D | 136 | 2 | 8 | 10 | 137 | |
| 1995 | 2 | 52 | Philippe Audet | Canada | LW | 4 | 0 | 0 | 0 | 0 | |
| 1995 | 3 | 58 | Darryl Laplante | Canada | C | 35 | 0 | 6 | 6 | 10 | |
| 1995 | 4 | 104 | Anatoly Ustyugov | Russia | C | — | — | — | — | — | |
| 1995 | 5 | 125 | Chad Wilchynski | Canada | D | — | — | — | — | — | |
| 1995 | 6 | 156 | Tyler Perry | Canada | C | — | — | — | — | — | |
| 1995 | 7 | 182 | Per Eklund | Sweden | RW | — | — | — | — | — | |
| 1995 | 8 | 208 | Andrei Samokhvalov | Russia | C | — | — | — | — | — | |
| 1995 | 9 | 234 | David Engblom | Sweden | LW | — | — | — | — | — | |
| 1996 | 1 | 26 | Jesse Wallin | Canada | D | 49 | 0 | 2 | 2 | 34 | |
| 1996 | 4 | 108 | Johan Forsander | Sweden | LW | — | — | — | — | — | |
| 1996 | 6 | 144 | Magnus Nilsson | Sweden | LW | — | — | — | — | — | |
| 1996 | 6 | 162 | Alexandre Jacques | Canada | RW | — | — | — | — | — | |
| 1996 | 7 | 189 | Colin Beardsmore | Canada | C | — | — | — | — | — | |
| 1996 | 8 | 215 | Craig Stahl | Canada | RW | — | — | — | — | — | |
| 1996 | 9 | 241 | Evgeny Afanasiev | Russia | LW | — | — | — | — | — | |
| 1997 | 2 | 49 | Yuri Butsayev | Russia | LW | 99 | 10 | 4 | 14 | 28 | |
| 1997 | 3 | 76 | Petr Sykora | Czech Republic | C | 12 | 2 | 2 | 4 | 6 | |
| 1997 | 4 | 102 | Quintin Laing | Canada | LW | 79 | 3 | 8 | 11 | 31 | |
| 1997 | 5 | 129 | John Wikstrom | Sweden | D | — | — | — | — | — | |
| 1997 | 6 | 157 | B. J. Young | United States | RW | 1 | 0 | 0 | 0 | 0 | |
| 1997 | 7 | 186 | Mike Laceby | Canada | C | — | — | — | — | — | |
| 1997 | 8 | 213 | Steve Wilejto | Canada | C | — | — | — | — | — | |
| 1997 | 9 | 239 | Greg Willers | Canada | D | — | — | — | — | — | |
| 1998 | 1 | 25 | Jiri Fischer | Czech Republic | D | 305 | 11 | 49 | 60 | 295 | |
| 1998 | 2 | 55 | Ryan Barnes | Canada | LW | 2 | 0 | 0 | 0 | 0 | |
| 1998 | 2 | 56 | Tomek Valtonen | Finland | LW | — | — | — | — | — | |
| 1998 | 4 | 111 | Brent Hobday | Canada | LW | — | — | — | — | — | |
| 1998 | 5 | 142 | Calle Steen | Sweden | C | — | — | — | — | — | |
| 1998 | 6 | 151 | Adam Deleeuw | Canada | LW | — | — | — | — | — | |
| 1998 | 6 | 171 | Pavel Datsyuk | Russia | C | 953 | 314 | 604 | 918 | 228 | |
| 1998 | 7 | 198 | Jeremy Goetzinger | Canada | D | — | — | — | — | — | |
| 1998 | 8 | 226 | David Petrasek | Sweden | D | — | — | — | — | — | |
| 1998 | 9 | 256 | Petja Pietilainen | Finland | RW | — | — | — | — | — | |
| 1999 | 4 | 120 | Jari Tolsa | Sweden | LW | — | — | — | — | — | |
| 1999 | 5 | 149 | Andrei Maximenko | Russia | LW | — | — | — | — | — | |
| 1999 | 6 | 181 | Kent McDonell | Canada | RW | 32 | 1 | 2 | 3 | 36 | |
| 1999 | 7 | 210 | Henrik Zetterberg | Sweden | LW | 1082 | 337 | 623 | 960 | 401 | |
| 1999 | 8 | 238 | Anton Borodkin | Russia | LW | — | — | — | — | — | |
| 1999 | 9 | 266 | Ken Davis | Canada | RW | — | — | — | — | — | |
| 2000 | 1 | 29 | Niklas Kronwall | Sweden | D | 953 | 83 | 349 | 432 | 564 | |
| 2000 | 2 | 38 | Tomas Kopecky | Slovakia | RW | 578 | 68 | 106 | 174 | 307 | |
| 2000 | 4 | 127 | Dmitri Semenov | Russia | C | — | — | — | — | — | |
| 2000 | 4 | 128 | Alexander Seluyanov | Russia | D | — | — | — | — | — | |
| 2000 | 4 | 130 | Aaron Van Leusen | Canada | RW | — | — | — | — | — | |
| 2000 | 6 | 187 | Par Backer | Sweden | C | — | — | — | — | — | |
| 2000 | 6 | 196 | Paul Ballantyne | Canada | D | — | — | — | — | — | |
| 2000 | 7 | 228 | Jimmie Svensson | Sweden | LW | — | — | — | — | — | |
| 2000 | 8 | 251 | Todd Jackson | United States | LW | — | — | — | — | — | |
| 2000 | 8 | 260 | Evgeni Bumagin | Russia | RW | — | — | — | — | — | |
| 2001 | 2 | 62 | Igor Grigorenko | Russia | LW | — | — | — | — | — | |
| 2001 | 4 | 129 | Miroslav Blatak | Czech Republic | D | — | — | — | — | — | |
| 2001 | 5 | 157 | Andreas Jamtin | Sweden | RW | — | — | — | — | — | |
| 2001 | 8 | 258 | Dmitri Bykov | Russia | D | 71 | 2 | 10 | 12 | 43 | |
| 2001 | 9 | 288 | Francois Senez | Canada | D | — | — | — | — | — | |
| 2002 | 2 | 58 | Jiri Hudler | Czech Republic | C | 708 | 164 | 264 | 428 | 243 | |
| 2002 | 2 | 63 | Tomas Fleischmann | Czech Republic | RW | 657 | 137 | 198 | 335 | 200 | |
| 2002 | 3 | 95 | Valtteri Filppula | Finland | C | 1056 | 197 | 333 | 530 | 346 | |
| 2002 | 4 | 131 | Johan Berggren | Sweden | D | — | — | — | — | — | |
| 2002 | 6 | 197 | Jimmy Cuddihy | Canada | C | — | — | — | — | — | |
| 2002 | 7 | 229 | Derek Meech | Canada | D | 144 | 4 | 13 | 17 | 45 | |
| 2002 | 8 | 260 | Pierre-Olivier Beaulieu | Canada | D | — | — | — | — | — | |
| 2002 | 9 | 262 | Christian Soderstrom | Sweden | LW | — | — | — | — | — | |
| 2002 | 9 | 291 | Jonathan Ericsson | Sweden | D | 680 | 27 | 98 | 125 | 535 | |
| 2003 | 4 | 132 | Kyle Quincey | Canada | D | 586 | 36 | 122 | 158 | 548 | |
| 2003 | 5 | 164 | Ryan Oulahen | Canada | LW | — | — | — | — | — | |
| 2003 | 6 | 170 | Andreas Sundin | Sweden | LW | — | — | — | — | — | |
| 2003 | 6 | 194 | Stefan Blom | Sweden | D | — | — | — | — | — | |
| 2003 | 7 | 226 | Tomas Kollar | Sweden | LW | — | — | — | — | — | |
| 2003 | 8 | 258 | Vladimir Kutny | Slovakia | LW | — | — | — | — | — | |
| 2003 | 9 | 289 | Mikael Johansson | Sweden | C | — | — | — | — | — | |
| 2004 | 3 | 97 | Johan Franzen | Sweden | RW | 602 | 187 | 183 | 370 | 401 | |
| 2004 | 4 | 128 | Evan McGrath | Canada | C | — | — | — | — | — | |
| 2004 | 5 | 151 | Sergei Kolosov | Belarus | D | — | — | — | — | — | |
| 2004 | 5 | 162 | Tyler Haskins | United States | C | — | — | — | — | — | |
| 2004 | 6 | 192 | Anton Axelsson | Sweden | LW | — | — | — | — | — | |
| 2004 | 7 | 226 | Steve Covington | Canada | RW | — | — | — | — | — | |
| 2004 | 8 | 257 | Gennady Stolyarov | Russia | RW | — | — | — | — | — | |
| 2004 | 9 | 290 | Nils Backstrom | Sweden | D | — | — | — | — | — | |
| 2005 | 1 | 19 | Jakub Kindl | Czech Republic | D | 331 | 16 | 58 | 74 | 181 | |
| 2005 | 2 | 42 | Justin Abdelkader | United States | LW | 739 | 106 | 146 | 252 | 608 | |
| 2005 | 3 | 80 | Christofer Lofberg | Sweden | C | — | — | — | — | — | |
| 2005 | 4 | 103 | Mattias Ritola | Sweden | LW | 43 | 4 | 5 | 9 | 17 | |
| 2005 | 5 | 132 | Darren Helm | Canada | LW | 823 | 119 | 147 | 266 | 256 | |
| 2005 | 5 | 137 | Johan Ryno | Sweden | LW | — | — | — | — | — | |
| 2005 | 5 | 151 | Jeff May | Canada | D | — | — | — | — | — | |
| 2005 | 6 | 175 | Juho Mielonen | Sweden | D | — | — | — | — | — | |
| 2005 | 7 | 214 | Bretton Stamler | Canada | D | — | — | — | — | — | |
| 2006 | 2 | 41 | Cory Emmerton | Canada | LW | 139 | 12 | 9 | 21 | 22 | |
| 2006 | 2 | 47 | Shawn Matthias | Canada | C | 551 | 90 | 84 | 174 | 180 | |
| 2006 | 2 | 62 | Dick Axelsson | Sweden | LW | — | — | — | — | — | |
| 2006 | 6 | 182 | Jan Mursak | Slovenia | RW | 46 | 2 | 2 | 4 | 8 | |
| 2006 | 7 | 191 | Nick Oslund | United States | RW | — | — | — | — | — | |
| 2006 | 7 | 212 | Logan Pyett | Canada | D | — | — | — | — | — | |
| 2007 | 1 | 27 | Brendan Smith | Canada | D | 741 | 39 | 107 | 146 | 798 | |
| 2007 | 3 | 88 | Joakim Andersson | Sweden | C | 205 | 15 | 21 | 36 | 48 | |
| 2007 | 5 | 148 | Randy Cameron | Canada | C | — | — | — | — | — | |
| 2007 | 6 | 178 | Zack Torquato | Canada | C | — | — | — | — | — | |
| 2007 | 7 | 208 | Bryan Rufenach | Canada | D | — | — | — | — | — | |
| 2008 | 3 | 91 | Max Nicastro | United States | D | — | — | — | — | — | |
| 2008 | 4 | 121 | Gustav Nyquist | Sweden | C | 914 | 210 | 333 | 543 | 22f0 | |
| 2008 | 5 | 151 | Julien Cayer | Canada | C | — | — | — | — | — | |
| 2008 | 6 | 181 | Stephen Johnston | Canada | C | — | — | — | — | — | |
| 2008 | 7 | 211 | Jesper Samuelsson | Sweden | C | — | — | — | — | — | |
| 2009 | 2 | 32 | Landon Ferraro | Canada | C | 77 | 7 | 5 | 12 | 29 | |
| 2009 | 2 | 60 | Tomas Tatar | Slovakia | LW | 927 | 227 | 269 | 496 | 316 | |
| 2009 | 3 | 75 | Andrej Nestrasil | Czech Republic | C | 128 | 17 | 31 | 48 | 18 | |
| 2009 | 3 | 90 | Gleason Fournier | Canada | D | — | — | — | — | — | |
| 2009 | 5 | 150 | Nick Jensen | United States | D | 696 | 27 | 146 | 173 | 166 | |
| 2009 | 6 | 180 | Mitch Callahan | United States | RW | 5 | 0 | 0 | 0 | 0 | |
| 2009 | 7 | 210 | Adam Almqvist | Sweden | D | 2 | 1 | 0 | 1 | 0 | |
| 2010 | 1 | 21 | Riley Sheahan | Canada | C | 637 | 74 | 120 | 194 | 97 | |
| 2010 | 2 | 51 | Calle Jarnkrok | Sweden | C | 774 | 143 | 173 | 316 | 163 | |
| 2010 | 3 | 81 | Louis-Marc Aubry | Canada | C | — | — | — | — | — | |
| 2010 | 4 | 111 | Teemu Pulkkinen | Finland | LW | 83 | 13 | 9 | 22 | 32 | |
| 2010 | 6 | 171 | Brooks Macek | Germany | C | — | — | — | — | — | |
| 2010 | 7 | 201 | Ben Marshall | United States | D | — | — | — | — | — | |
| 2011 | 2 | 35 | Tomas Jurco | Slovakia | RW | 221 | 22 | 31 | 53 | 64 | |
| 2011 | 2 | 48 | Xavier Ouellet | Canada | D | 178 | 5 | 23 | 28 | 82 | |
| 2011 | 2 | 55 | Ryan Sproul | Canada | D | 44 | 2 | 10 | 12 | 12 | |
| 2011 | 3 | 85 | Alan Quine | Canada | C | 106 | 10 | 18 | 28 | 22 | |
| 2011 | 4 | 115 | Marek Tvrdon | Slovakia | LW | — | — | — | — | — | |
| 2011 | 5 | 145 | Philippe Hudon | Canada | RW | — | — | — | — | — | |
| 2011 | 5 | 146 | Mattias Backman | Sweden | D | — | — | — | — | — | |
| 2011 | 6 | 175 | Richard Nedomlel | Czech Republic | D | — | — | — | — | — | |
| 2011 | 7 | 205 | Alexey Marchenko | Russia | D | 121 | 4 | 17 | 21 | 26 | |
| 2012 | 2 | 49 | Martin Frk | Czech Republic | RW | 124 | 20 | 21 | 41 | 24 | |
| 2012 | 4 | 110 | Andreas Athanasiou | Canada | C | 495 | 128 | 118 | 246 | 189 | |
| 2012 | 5 | 140 | Michael McKee | Canada | D | — | — | — | — | — | |
| 2012 | 6 | 170 | James De Haas | Canada | D | — | — | — | — | — | |
| 2012 | 7 | 200 | Rasmus Bodin | Sweden | LW | — | — | — | — | — | |
| 2013 | 1 | 20 | Anthony Mantha | Canada | RW | 601 | 182 | 190 | 372 | 327 | |
| 2013 | 2 | 48 | Zach Nastasiuk | Canada | RW | — | — | — | — | — | |
| 2013 | 2 | 58 | Tyler Bertuzzi | Canada | LW | 579 | 170 | 200 | 370 | 353 | |
| 2013 | 3 | 79 | Mattias Janmark-Nylén | Sweden | C | 680 | 83 | 138 | 221 | 227 | |
| 2013 | 4 | 109 | David Pope | Canada | LW | — | — | — | — | — | |
| 2013 | 5 | 139 | Mitchell Wheaton | Canada | D | — | — | — | — | — | |
| 2013 | 6 | 169 | Marc McNulty | Canada | D | — | — | — | — | — | |
| 2013 | 7 | 199 | Hampus Melen | Sweden | RW | — | — | — | — | — | |
| 2014 | 1 | 15 | Dylan Larkin | United States | C | 818 | 278 | 371 | 649 | 503 | |
| 2014 | 3 | 63 | Dominic Turgeon | United States | C | 9 | 0 | 0 | 0 | 2 | |
| 2014 | 4 | 106 | Christoffer Ehn | Sweden | C | 114 | 5 | 8 | 13 | 8 | |
| 2014 | 6 | 166 | Julius Vahatalo | Finland | LW | — | — | — | — | — | |
| 2014 | 7 | 196 | Axel Holmstrom | Sweden | C | — | — | — | — | — | |
| 2014 | 7 | 201 | Alexander Kadeikin | Russia | C | — | — | — | — | — | |
| 2015 | 1 | 19 | Evgeny Svechnikov | Russia | LW | 172 | 20 | 25 | 45 | 84 | |
| 2015 | 3 | 73 | Vili Saarijarvi | Finland | D | — | — | — | — | — | |
| 2015 | 5 | 140 | Chase Pearson | Canada | C | 3 | 0 | 0 | 0 | 0 | |
| 2015 | 6 | 170 | Patrick Holway | United States | D | — | — | — | — | — | |
| 2015 | 7 | 200 | Adam Marsh | United States | LW | — | — | — | — | — | |
| 2016 | 1 | 20 | Dennis Cholowski | Canada | D | 173 | 13 | 29 | 42 | 40 | |
| 2016 | 2 | 46 | Givani Smith | Canada | RW | 168 | 9 | 13 | 22 | 268 | |
| 2016 | 2 | 53 | Filip Hronek | Czech Republic | D | 547 | 49 | 248 | 297 | 273 | |
| 2016 | 4 | 107 | Alfons Malmstrom | Sweden | D | — | — | — | — | — | |
| 2016 | 5 | 137 | Jordan Sambrook | Canada | D | — | — | — | — | — | |
| 2016 | 7 | 197 | Mattias Elfstrom | Sweden | C | — | — | — | — | — | |
| 2017 | 1 | 9 | Michael Rasmussen | Canada | C | 466 | 67 | 90 | 157 | 245 | |
| 2017 | 2 | 38 | Gustav Lindström | Sweden | D | 174 | 5 | 30 | 35 | 80 | |
| 2017 | 3 | 71 | Kasper Kotkansalo | Finland | D | — | — | — | — | — | |
| 2017 | 3 | 79 | Lane Zablocki | Canada | D | — | — | — | — | — | |
| 2017 | 3 | 83 | Zach Gallant | Canada | C | — | — | — | — | — | |
| 2017 | 4 | 100 | Malte Setkov | Denmark | D | — | — | — | — | — | |
| 2017 | 5 | 131 | Cole Fraser | Canada | D | — | — | — | — | — | |
| 2017 | 6 | 162 | John Adams | United States | RW | — | — | — | — | — | |
| 2017 | 6 | 164 | Reilly Webb | Canada | D | — | — | — | — | — | |
| 2017 | 7 | 193 | Brady Gilmour | Canada | C | — | — | — | — | — | |
| 2018 | 1 | 6 | Filip Zadina | Czech Republic | RW | 262 | 41 | 50 | 91 | 40 | |
| 2018 | 1 | 30 | Joe Veleno | Canada | C | 371 | 40 | 46 | 86 | 119 | |
| 2018 | 2 | 33 | Jonatan Berggren | Sweden | RW | 217 | 39 | 46 | 85 | 48 | |
| 2018 | 2 | 36 | Jared McIsaac | Canada | D | — | — | — | — | — | |
| 2018 | 3 | 67 | Alec Regula | United States | D | 51 | 1 | 3 | 4 | 51 | |
| 2018 | 3 | 81 | Seth Barton | Canada | D | — | — | — | — | — | |
| 2018 | 4 | 98 | Ryan O'Reilly | United States | RW | — | — | — | — | — | |
| 2018 | 7 | 191 | Otto Kivenmaki | Finland | C | — | — | — | — | — | |
| 2019 | 1 | 6 | Moritz Seider | Germany | D | 422 | 39 | 207 | 246 | 226 | |
| 2019 | 2 | 35 | Antti Tuomisto | Finland | D | — | — | — | — | — | |
| 2019 | 2 | 54 | Robert Mastrosimone | United States | LW | — | — | — | — | — | |
| 2019 | 2 | 60 | Albert Johansson | Sweden | D | 154 | 6 | 15 | 21 | 48 | |
| 2019 | 2 | 66 | Albin Grewe | Sweden | RW | — | — | — | — | — | |
| 2019 | 4 | 97 | Ethan Phillips | Canada | C | — | — | — | — | — | |
| 2019 | 5 | 128 | Cooper Moore | United States | D | — | — | — | — | — | |
| 2019 | 6 | 159 | Elmer Soderblom | Sweden | RW | 112 | 16 | 17 | 33 | 37 | |
| 2019 | 6 | 177 | Gustav Berglund | Sweden | D | — | — | — | — | — | |
| 2019 | 7 | 190 | Kirill Tyutyayev | Russia | LW | — | — | — | — | — | |
| 2020 | 1 | 4 | Lucas Raymond | Sweden | LW | 412 | 126 | 215 | 341 | 116 | |
| 2020 | 2 | 32 | William Wallinder | Sweden | D | 7 | 2 | 1 | 3 | 0 | |
| 2020 | 2 | 51 | Theodor Niederbach | Sweden | C | — | — | — | — | — | |
| 2020 | 2 | 55 | Cross Hanas | United States | LW | — | — | — | — | — | |
| 2020 | 3 | 63 | Donovan Sebrango | Canada | D | 44 | 0 | 8 | 8 | 68 | |
| 2020 | 3 | 70 | Eemil Viro | Finland | D | — | — | — | — | — | |
| 2020 | 4 | 97 | Sam Stange | United States | RW | — | — | — | — | — | |
| 2020 | 5 | 132 | Alex Cotton | Canada | D | — | — | — | — | — | |
| 2020 | 6 | 156 | Kyle Aucoin | Canada | D | — | — | — | — | — | |
| 2020 | 7 | 187 | Kienan Draper | United States | RW | — | — | — | — | — | |
| 2020 | 7 | 203 | Chase Bradley | United States | LW | 2 | 0 | 0 | 0 | 0 | |
| 2021 | 1 | 6 | Simon Edvinsson | Sweden | D | 175 | 19 | 41 | 60 | 158 | |
| 2021 | 2 | 36 | Shai Buium | United States | D | — | — | — | — | — | |
| 2021 | 3 | 70 | Carter Mazur | United States | LW | 15 | 0 | 1 | 1 | 0 | |
| 2021 | 4 | 114 | Redmond Savage | United States | C | — | — | — | — | — | |
| 2021 | 5 | 134 | Liam Dower Nilsson | Sweden | C | — | — | — | — | — | |
| 2021 | 5 | 155 | Oscar Plandowski | Canada | D | — | — | — | — | — | |
| 2021 | 6 | 166 | Pasquale Zito | Canada | LW | — | — | — | — | — | |
| 2022 | 1 | 8 | Marco Kasper | Austria | C | 160 | 28 | 28 | 56 | 72 | |
| 2022 | 2 | 40 | Dylan James | Canada | LW | — | — | — | — | — | |
| 2022 | 2 | 52 | Dmitri Buchelnikov | Russia | D | — | — | — | — | — | |
| 2022 | 4 | 105 | Anton Johansson | Sweden | D | 12 | 1 | 3 | 4 | 12 | |
| 2022 | 4 | 113 | Amadeus Lombardi | Canada | C | 11 | 0 | 4 | 4 | 8 | |
| 2022 | 4 | 129 | Maximilian Kilpinen | Sweden | LW | — | — | — | — | — | |
| 2022 | 5 | 137 | Tnias Mathurin | Canada | D | — | — | — | — | — | |
| 2022 | 7 | 201 | Owen Mehlenbacher | Canada | C | — | — | — | — | — | |
| 2022 | 7 | 212 | Brennan Ali | United States | C | — | — | — | — | — | |
| 2023 | 1 | 9 | Nate Danielson | Canada | C | 38 | 2 | 7 | 9 | 6 | |
| 2023 | 1 | 17 | Axel Sandin-Pellikka | Sweden | D | 75 | 7 | 15 | 22 | 22 | |
| 2023 | 2 | 42 | Andrew Gibson | Canada | D | — | — | — | — | — | |
| 2023 | 2 | 47 | Brady Cleveland | United States | D | — | — | — | — | — | |
| 2023 | 3 | 73 | Noah Dower Nilsson | Sweden | LW | — | — | — | — | — | |
| 2023 | 4 | 117 | Larry Keenan | Canada | D | — | — | — | — | — | |
| 2023 | 5 | 137 | Jack Phelan | United States | D | — | — | — | — | — | |
| 2023 | 5 | 147 | Kevin Bicker | Germany | LW | — | — | — | — | — | |
| 2023 | 7 | 201 | Emmitt Finnie | Canada | C | 94 | 18 | 20 | 38 | 8 | |
| 2024 | 1 | 15 | Michael Brandsegg-Nygard | Norway | RW | 26 | 2 | 7 | 9 | 8 | |
| 2024 | 2 | 47 | Max Plante | United States | LW | — | — | — | — | — | |
| 2024 | 3 | 80 | Ondrej Becher | Czechia | C | — | — | — | — | — | |
| 2024 | 5 | 144 | John Whipple | United States | D | — | — | — | — | — | |
| 2024 | 6 | 176 | Charlie Forslund | Sweden | LW | — | — | — | — | — | |
| 2024 | 7 | 203 | Austin Baker | United States | LW | — | — | — | — | — | |
| 2024 | 7 | 208 | Fisher Scott | United States | D | — | — | — | — | — | |
| 2025 | 1 | 13 | Carter Bear | Canada | LW | — | — | — | — | — | |
| 2025 | 2 | 44 | Eddie Genborg | Sweden | RW | — | — | — | — | — | |
| 2025 | 4 | 109 | Brent Solomon | United States | RW | — | — | — | — | — | |
| 2025 | 4 | 119 | Michal Svrcek | Slovakia | LW | — | — | — | — | — | |
| 2025 | 5 | 140 | Nikita Tyurin | Russia | D | — | — | — | — | — | |
| 2025 | 6 | 172 | Will Murphy | Canada | D | — | — | — | — | — | |
| 2025 | 7 | 204 | Grayden Robertson-Palmer | Canada | C | — | — | — | — | — | |
| 2026 | 1 | 23 | JP Hurlbert | United States | LW | — | — | — | — | — | |
| 2026 | 2 | 47 | Victor Plante | United States | LW | — | — | — | — | — | |
| 2026 | 4 | 108 | Adam Levac | Canada | C | — | — | — | — | — | |
| 2026 | 5 | 143 | Beckham Edwards | Canada | C | — | — | — | — | — | |
| 2026 | 6 | 175 | Luka Arkko | Finland | LW | — | — | — | — | — | |
| 2026 | 7 | 196 | Myles Brosnan | United States | D | — | — | — | — | — | |

== See also ==
- List of NHL first overall draft choices
- List of undrafted NHL players with 100 games played
- List of NHL players
