= Serge Lajeunesse =

Canadian ice hockey player (1950–2026)

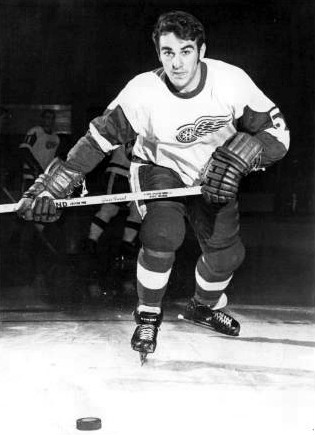
- Born: June 11, 1950 Montreal, Quebec, Canada
- Died: February 22, 2026 (aged 75)
- Height: 5 ft 10 in (178 cm)
- Weight: 185 lb (84 kg; 13 st 3 lb)
- Position: Defence
- Shot: Left
- Played for: Detroit Red Wings; Philadelphia Flyers
- NHL draft: 12th overall, 1970; Detroit Red Wings
- Playing career: 1970–1976

Serge Lajeunesse (June 11, 1950 – February 22, 2026) was a Canadian professional ice hockey defenceman who played 103 games in the National Hockey League (NHL) for the Detroit Red Wings and Philadelphia Flyers between 1970 and 1974.

== Playing career ==
=== Juniors ===
Lajeunesse was born in Montreal, Quebec. He started playing hockey in his hometown of Montreal with the Montreal Junior Canadiens of the Ontario Hockey Association. He scored 22 points in combination with 172 penalty minutes in his first season with the team and helped them win the Memorial Cup. The following season in 1969–70, Lajeunesse scored 29 points and saw his penalty minutes decrease almost by half to 87 on the season and again helped the team win their second consecutive Memorial Cup. The Detroit Red Wings drafted him with their first pick, 12th overall, in the 1970 NHL Amateur Draft.

=== Professional ===
Lajeunesse started off in Detroit's farm team, the Fort Worth Wings of the Central Hockey League. He only played in 12 games before being brought up to the Red Wings on November 12, 1970 against the St. Louis Blues. In the remaining 62 games of the 1970–71 NHL season, Lajeunesse recorded 55 penalty minutes, recorded four assists, and scored his only NHL goal. After the Wings failed to reach the playoffs again that year, Lajeunesse was re-assessed and sent back down to the minors.

The following season saw Lajeunesse move back and forth in the Wings' organization. He spent time with the Tidewater Wings of the American Hockey League and Fort Worth, while suiting up for seven games in Detroit. He contributed 20 penalty minutes in those seven games without scoring a point and finished the 1971–72 season back in Fort Worth where he helped with a short playoff run. He continued playing in the minor leagues with Tidewater (now renamed the Virginia Wings) in 1972–73 before being called back to Detroit to fill in for injuries. Lajeunesse played in 28 NHL games that year and ended with 1 assist to go with 26 penalty minutes.

Lajeunesse was traded on May 15, 1973 to the Philadelphia Flyers for Rick Foley. He started off in the Flyers' farm system and would retire there. Lajeunesse played six more NHL games with Philadelphia in the following two seasons. He helped his AHL team the Richmond Robins reach the playoffs in three consecutive seasons (1973–74, 1974–75, 1975–76), but failed to help them get past the second round. Lajeunesse retired from hockey in 1976.

== Death ==
Lajeunesse died on February 22, 2026, at the age of 75.

== Career statistics ==
=== Regular season and playoffs ===
			Regular season					Playoffs
Season	Team	League	GP	G	A	Pts	PIM	GP	G	A	Pts	PIM
1967–68	Montreal Beavers	QJAHL	40	5	14	19	—	—	—	—	—	—
1968–69	Montreal Junior Canadiens	OHA	54	2	20	22	172	14	1	4	5	19
1968–69	Montreal Junior Canadiens	M-Cup	—	—	—	—	—	8	1	4	5	19
1969–70	Montreal Junior Canadiens	OHA	54	2	27	29	87	16	0	8	8	22
1969–70	Montreal Junior Canadiens	M-Cup	—	—	—	—	—	12	3	9	12	21
1970–71	Detroit Red Wings	NHL	62	1	3	4	55	—	—	—	—	—
1970–71	Fort Worth Wings	CHL	12	1	5	6	21	—	—	—	—	—
1971–72	Detroit Red Wings	NHL	7	0	0	0	20	—	—	—	—	—
1971–72	Tidewater Wings	AHL	26	4	7	11	26	—	—	—	—	—
1971–72	Fort Worth Wings	CHL	36	8	11	19	53	7	0	2	2	16
1972–73	Detroit Red Wings	NHL	28	0	1	1	26	—	—	—	—	—
1972–73	Virginia Wings	AHL	39	7	16	23	69	13	2	5	7	23
1973–74	Philadelphia Flyers	NHL	1	0	0	0	0	—	—	—	—	—
1973–74	Richmond Robins	AHL	75	28	17	45	96	5	0	5	5	2
1974–75	Philadelphia Flyers	NHL	5	0	0	0	2	—	—	—	—	—
1974–75	Richmond Robins	AHL	66	11	18	29	58	7	1	2	3	4
1975–76	Richmond Robins	AHL	57	7	17	24	42	3	0	0	0	2
AHL totals			263	57	75	132	291	28	3	12	15	31
NHL totals			103	1	4	5	103	—	—	—	—	—

== Awards ==
- Memorial Cup: 1969, 1970 (Montreal)
- OHA All-Star Second Team: 1968–69, 1969–70 (Montreal)

Preceded by Jim Rutherford	Detroit Red Wings first-round draft pick 1970	Succeeded by Marcel Dionne
