= Richie Bayes =

Canadian ice hockey player (1948–2006)

- Born: March 21, 1948 Toronto, Ontario, Canada
- Died: October 16, 2006 (aged 58) Canada
- Height: 5 ft 11 in (180 cm)
- Weight: 160 lb (73 kg; 11 st 6 lb)
- Position: Centre
- Shot: Left
- Played for: Johnstown Jets; Broome Dusters
- National team: Canada
- NHL draft: 4th overall, 1964; Chicago Blackhawks
- Playing career: 1973–1974

Richmond Allan "Richie" Bayes (March 21, 1948 – October 16, 2006) was a Canadian professional ice hockey centre who was selected by the Chicago Black Hawks in the first round (fourth overall) of the 1964 NHL Amateur Draft, however he never played a game in the NHL. After his retirement from professional hockey, he worked at the Bible Hill Junior High School as a vice principal and teacher in Bible Hill, Nova Scotia. He also coached for the Truro and Area Minor Hockey Association.

== Career statistics ==
=== Regular season and playoffs ===
			Regular season					Playoffs
Season	Team	League	GP	G	A	Pts	PIM	GP	G	A	Pts	PIM
1965–66	St. Catharines Black Hawks	OHA	46	20	15	35	2	—	—	—	—	—
1966–67	Toronto Marlboros	OHA	48	22	20	42	8	—	—	—	—	—
1967–68	Toronto Marlboros	OHA	54	40	52	92	21	—	—	—	—	—
1968–69	Ottawa Nationals	OHASr	7	6	6	12	0	—	—	—	—	—
1969–70	Canadian National Team	Intl	N/A	N/A	N/A	N/A	N/A	—	—	—	—	—
1970–71	St. Mary's University	CIAU	18	17	25	42	8	—	—	—	—	—
1971–72	St. Mary's University	CIAU	18	7	21	28	4	—	—	—	—	—
1972–73	St. Mary's University	CIAU	21	17	24	41	0	—	—	—	—	—
1973–74	Johnstown Jets	NAHL	3	0	1	1	0	—	—	—	—	—
1973–74	Broome Dusters	NAHL	53	17	31	48	23	—	—	—	—	—
NAHL totals			56	17	32	49	23	—	—	—	—	—

=== International ===
Year	Team	Event	GP	G	A	Pts	PIM
1969	Canada	WC	8	2	2	4	0

Preceded by Art Hampson	Chicago Blackhawks first-round draft pick 1964	Succeeded by Andy Culligan
