= Marcel Dionne =

Canadian ice hockey player (born 1951)

- Hockey Hall of Fame, 1992
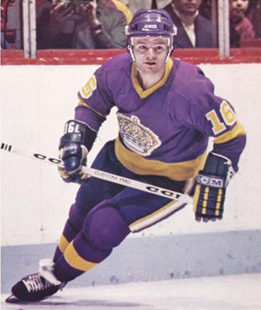
- Dionne with the Los Angeles Kings in 1979
- Born: August 3, 1951 (age 75) Drummondville, Quebec, Canada
- Height: 5 ft 8 in (173 cm)
- Weight: 185 lb (84 kg; 13 st 3 lb)
- Position: Centre
- Shot: Right
- Played for: Detroit Red Wings; Los Angeles Kings; New York Rangers
- National team: Canada
- NHL draft: 2nd overall, 1971; Detroit Red Wings
- Playing career: 1971–1989
Medal record
Representing Canada
Canada Cup
Gold medal – first place	1976 Canada
World Championships
Bronze medal – third place	1978 Czechoslovakia
Bronze medal – third place	1983 West Germany
Bronze medal – third place	1986 Soviet Union

Marcel Elphège Dionne (dee-OHN; born August 3, 1951) is a Canadian former professional ice hockey centre. He played 18 seasons in the National Hockey League (NHL) for the Detroit Red Wings, Los Angeles Kings and New York Rangers between 1971 and 1989.

Dionne played five seasons of junior hockey before being drafted by Detroit in 1971, where he immediately made the major league roster. His 77 points in his rookie season set the record for most points for a player in their first NHL season. He recorded his first 100-point season in the 1974–75 season, which saw him win the Lady Byng Memorial Trophy for the first time for his sportsmanship and named to the first of his eight selections to the NHL All-Star Game. Conflicts with management led to him signing as a free agent with the Kings in 1975. The 1976–77 season saw him record his first 50-goal season, and he would record five consecutive 50-goal seasons from 1978 to 1983, becoming the third player to do so in NHL history; he won the Art Ross Trophy as the leading scorer in the 1979–80 season. He was awarded the Lester B. Pearson Award for his play as voted by his peers in 1979 and 1980. In 1982, he became the ninth NHL player to score 500 goals. He was traded late in the 1986–87 season to the Rangers, where he recorded his 700th goal and 1,000th assist before he was cut prior to the 1989 season.

A prolific scorer, he recorded 50 goals or more in a season six times, and 100 points or more in a season eight times during his career. His 731 goals rank as sixth most in NHL history and is the most for a player who never reached or won a Stanley Cup. He was the third player with 1,000 career assists when he retired. Internationally, Dionne played for the Canadian national team at two Canada Cups and three World Championships, winning the Canada Cup once in 1976. Dionne was inducted into the Hockey Hall of Fame in 1992. In 2017, Dionne was named one of the '100 Greatest NHL Players' in history.

== Early life ==
Dionne was born on August 3, 1951, in Drummondville, Quebec, Canada to Gilbert Sr. and Laurette Dionne. He was the oldest of eight children, and his youngest brother Gilbert was 19 years his junior. Growing up, his father worked as a foreman at a steel plant while his mother ran a corner store and beauty salon with her children's help. Due to limited finances, Dionne's extended family pitched in to help cover the costs of his hockey equipment. He played baseball as a youth as well, but chose to focus solely on hockey due to lack of prospects for Canadian baseball players.

== Playing career ==
=== Junior career ===
Dionne played in the 1962, 1963 and 1964 Quebec International Pee-Wee Hockey Tournaments with his Drummondville youth team. During his pee-wee career, Dionne garnered widespread attention from hockey teams and fans. He would often find dollar bills stuffed in his gloves from fans, and his parents received a letter from the Montreal Canadiens informing them to "take special care of young Marcel." His short stature earned him the nickname "little beaver," a reference to a popular midget wrestler. At the age of 14, Dionne was voted the first star of the 1966 Cornwall International Bantam "A" Tournament after scoring 21 points in four games.

While playing with the Drummondville Rangers, Dionne earned the attention of scouts from the St. Catharines Black Hawks of the Ontario Hockey Association (OHA). While the Montreal Canadiens invited him to attend one of their junior camps, Dionne chose to move to St. Catharines and learn English in 1968. This sparked outrage among locals who threatened legal action if Dionne tried to move leagues. On advice from a lawyer, Dionne's parents pretended to separate, and Dionne moved to St. Catharines with his mother, brother, and three sisters. While he played in six of the Black Hawks' seven exhibition games, he was still ineligible to play in the OHA regular season without permission from the Canadian Amateur Hockey Association (CAHA). The CAHA executive and branch presidents voted "by a narrow margin" to allow Dionne to play in the OHA. One of the Black Hawks' compelling arguments was that Dionne was already enrolled in Grade 13, which was not available in Quebec. He made his OHA regular season debut on October 18, 1968 against the Niagara Falls Flyers. Dionne finished his rookie season second in league scoring with 37 goals and 63 assists for 100 points. His points total set a new rookie scoring record, and he received the league's Rookie of the Year award.

When Dionne returned to the Black Hawks for his sophomore season, he won the league's scoring title and was named to the OHA's 1969–70 Second All-Star Team. He finished the regular season with 55 goals and 77 assists for 132 points. Dionne was named team captain in his final season with the Black Hawks before the start of the 1970–71 season. Despite missing 14 games, he improved upon his previous two seasons and finished with 62 goals and 81 assists. During the 1971 Richardson Cup finals against the Quebec Remparts, Dionne's Black Hawks' team bus was attacked by a mob after Game 4. The team laid on the floor of the bus as the mob outside lobbed bottles at the bus's windows. As such, the fifth game was played at a neutral site and the Black Hawks forfeited the remainder of the series due to fears of further violence.

Dionne was drafted in the first round, second overall, by the Detroit Red Wings in the 1971 NHL amateur draft.

=== Professional career ===
==== Detroit Red Wings (1971–1975) ====
Following the draft, Dionne signed a rookie contract with the Red Wings for a record-breaking amount with various bonuses. While the exact terms were not released, his bargaining agent Alan Eagleson said: "If Marcel gets as many goals as I think he can, he'll be paid like a super-star...No matter what he does, he's got the best contract in the history of the league for a rookie." It was speculated that the amount was $50,000 with incentive clauses which could add another $15,000 to $20,000. Despite having a self-proclaimed "poor training camp," Dionne was named to the Red Wings opening roster for the 1971–72 season. He made his NHL debut on October 9, 1971, in the teams season opener against the Minnesota North Stars. He recorded his first career NHL goal on October 16, 1971, in a 9–2 loss to the St. Louis Blues. While the Red Wings began the season with a losing 2–5-0 record, Dionne scored three goals and two assists. Dionne spent the majority of his rookie season playing on a line with Bill Collins and Nick Libett. By January, he had earned more on ice responsibility and was part of the Red Wings' power-play and penalty kill unit. While playing in this dual role, Dionne ranked third on the team in scoring and 22nd in the league. He also set numerous personal and league-wide milestones in March. He recorded his first career NHL hat-trick on March 19, 1972, in a 7–6 win over the Montreal Canadiens. He then assisted on four goals the following game to tie with Rick Martin of Buffalo Sabres for 13th place on the NHL scoring list. Dionne added two goals and two assists in his next game to break the NHL record for most points by a rookie. He finished the regular season as the Red Wings' leading scorer with 28 goals and 49 assists and finished third in Calder Memorial Trophy voting as the NHL's top rookie. During the offseason, Dionne signed a three-year contract extension with the Red Wings and was the youngest player on Team Canada at the Summit Series.

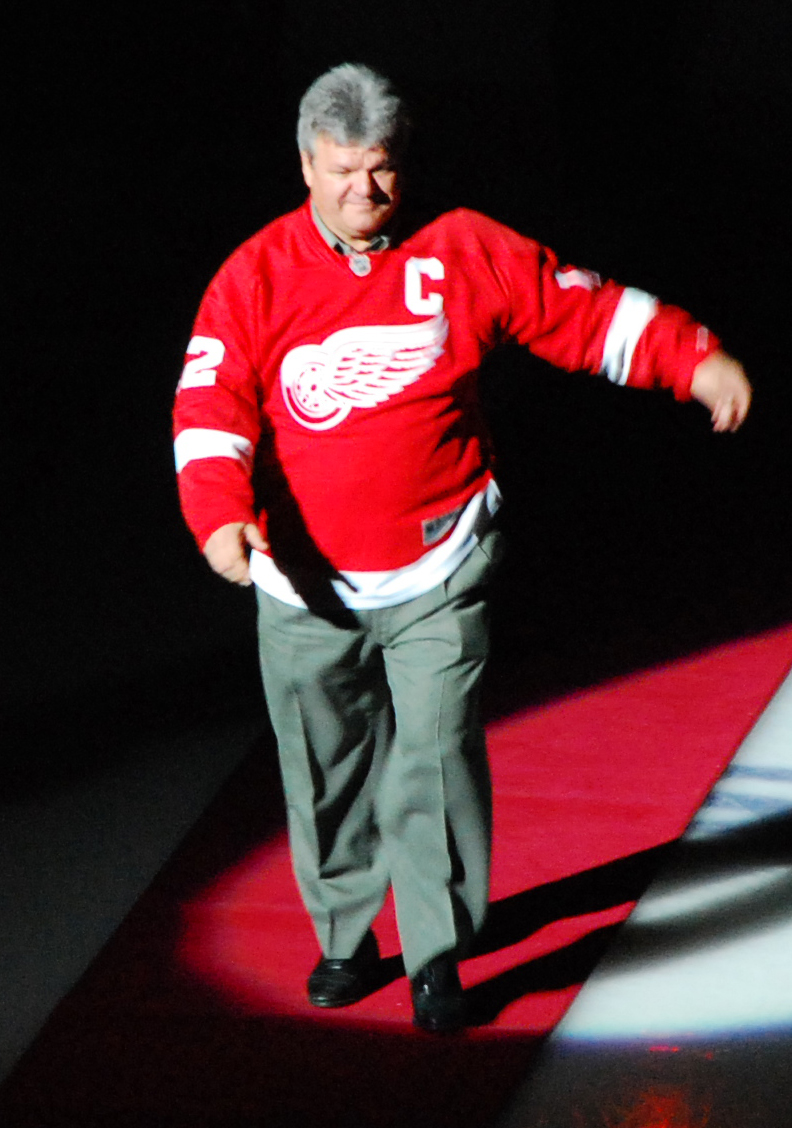
Dionne on Gordie Howe Night at Joe Louis Arena in Detroit in 2008

Due to the Summit Series, Dionne missed the entire training camp and returned to Detroit three days before the 1972–73 season opener. The Red Wings began the season with a six-game win streak before losing four straight games. Following the fourth consecutive loss, head coach Johnny Wilson mandated a two-hour bag skate. (Note: A bag skate is a relentless skate from one end of the ice to the other.) However, both Wilson and general manager Ned Harkness felt that Dionne was not giving enough effort. Following the skate, Harkness told the media, "If he keeps it up and doesn't start working, he might find himself playing in the minors." While Harkness later said he was misquoted, Dionne expressed his frustration that he spoke to the media instead of having a conversation with him. On December 2, Dionne scored one goal and three assists in his 100th career NHL game. This tied him with Richard Martin and Fred Stanfield for seventh place in league scoring. However, his earlier conflicts with management continued into December and resulted in a suspension. Following a 7–0 loss to the Minnesota North Stars on December 9, Wilson mandated a morning practice before their game against the Vancouver Canucks. After Wilson called out Dionne for a perceived lack of effort, he told him to "go home and stay there until he felt he could come back and make a contribution to the team." Due to a miscommunication as to the meaning of that order, Dionne assumed he had been suspended and missed their game that night. However, the Red Wings claimed he had not been suspended until he failed to show for that evening's game. Immediately following their game against the Canucks, Harkness handed out a press released that said that Dionne was “suspended indefinitely (without pay) for failing to report for the game.” Despite this statement, Dionne was reinstated the following day after a discussion with the coaching staff. After rejoining the team, Dionne scored his second career hat-trick against the Canadiens on February 22, 1973. By the end of February, he had amassed 36 goals and 76 points. Dionne finished the regular season tied with Dennis Hull for 11th in league scoring with 90 points. His 167 total career points were the most ever collected by an NHL player through their first two seasons.

While Dionne arrived at the Red Wings' 1973 training camp eight pounds overweight, head coach Ted Garvin said he was more concerned about his moodiness. His attitude and poor start to the 1973–74 season resulted in a temporary suspension before his 11th game. At the time, he had collected seven assists and no goals. After he was reinstated, Dionne told members of the media that he asked to be traded "for the benefit of the team...and for the good of the other players." Despite Dionne verbalising his unhappiness in Detroit, the Red Wings were hesitant to trade him due to the poor results of their trade of centreman Garry Unger. In between the trade talks, Dionne broke his 22-game goalless streak on November 29 against the St. Louis Blues. The Red Wings also fired Garvin and replaced him with Alex Delvecchio. In December 1973, Eagleson warned the Red Wings that they could lose Dionne to the World Hockey Association (WHA) if they did not trade him. However, Dionne denied asking for a trade and finished the season with the Red Wings. Dionne's offensive output improved in the second half of the season and he ended January with 13 goals and 26 assists over 15 games. By the end of February, he had amassed 61 points through 59 games. However, Dionne suffered a knee injury in March during a game against the New York Rangers and missed several games to recover.

During the 1974 offseason, Delvecchio spoke to Dionne about returning to training camp at a healthy weight, and was disappointed when Dionne arrived at camp 15 pounds overweight. Despite this, Dionne was appointed captain of the Red Wings at the start of the 1974–75 season, and he changed his jersey number to 12. At the age of 23, he was the second-youngest captain in the NHL that season, behind 22-year-old Jim Schoenfeld. Delvecchio gave Dionne the captaincy in an effort "to give him more responsibility." In this new role, he was praised by both teammates and management for his positive attitude while also leading the league with 12 points over his first five games. However, his lack of goals worried fans and he was sent medallions and jewelry to try and help him break the streak. Dionne scored seven goals and 20 assists through November, and tied with Bobby Clarke for seventh place in league scoring by mid-December. He finished the season ranked third in league scoring and became the first player in NHL history to score 10 short-handed goals in one season. He was also fifth in voting for the Lady Byng Memorial Trophy as the NHL's most gentlemanly player.

In his final season with the Red Wings, Dionne scored 47 goals and 74 assists through 80 games. He received the 1975 Lady Byng Memorial Trophy after only accumulating 14 penalty minutes all season.

==== Los Angeles Kings (1975–1987) ====
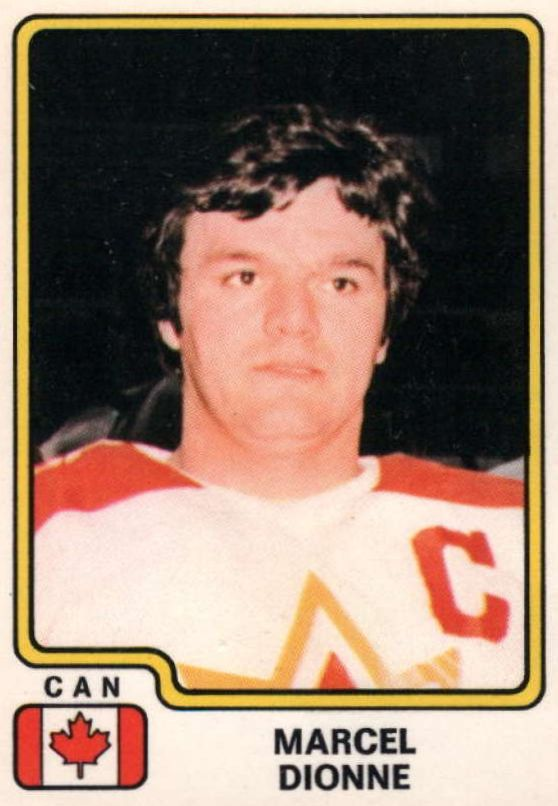
Marcel Dionne with Team Canada in 1979

As a free agent, Dionne and Eagleson fielded offers from the Edmonton Oilers of the WHA, Chicago Blackhawks, Toronto Maple Leafs, Los Angeles Kings, Montreal Canadiens, St. Louis Blues, Buffalo Sabres, and New York Islanders. However, his agent felt that the Red Wings were deterring offers as they wanted "a couple of regulars and a super-star for Marcel." Despite being offered a six-figure contract from the Oilers to join the WHA, he agreed to a $1.5 million contract with the Kings. In an effort to avoid arbitration, the Kings offered the Red Wings Terry Harper, Dan Maloney, cash, and draft picks in exchange for Dionne. However, after Harper failed to appear at the Red Wings' training camp, an injunction was requested to prohibit Dionne from joining the Kings. A judge ultimately rejected the injunction, and Dionne was able to continue participating in the Kings' training camp. Upon arriving in Los Angeles, head coach Bob Pulford assigned Dionne to a weight loss regimen which included skating extra laps with plastic sheets around his stomach.

While the Kings started the 1975–76 season with back-to-back losses, Dionne helped them win their next four consecutive games. He quickly accumulated five goals and six assists through six games while centering a line with Gene Carr and Mike Murphy. By the end of October, he had maintained an eight-game goal streak for 10 goals overall and 14 assists. During the streak, Dionne recorded his fifth career hat-trick and set a Kings franchise record with 11 shots on net in one game. While he found success offensively, he also received criticism from coaching staff and hockey pundits for his lack of defensive mindedness. On March 27, 1976, Dionne scored his 37th goal of the season to tie a franchise record for most goals in a single season. He then surpassed the record set by Mike Corrigan with his 38th goal on March 31, against the St. Louis Blues. Dionne finished the regular season with a franchise-leading 40 goals and 54 assists en route to the 1976 Stanley Cup playoffs. While the Kings beat the Atlanta Flames in the preliminary round of the playoffs, they fell to the Boston Bruins in seven games. After the Kings were shut out by the Bruins in Game 1, Dionne scored his first two postseason goals in Game 2 to help the Kings even their quarterfinal series. He scored a hat-trick the following game to lead the Kings to a 6–4 win and a 2–1 series lead. While he finished the series leading the team with six goals, the Kings were ultimately eliminated from playoff contention.

During the offseason, Dionne was chosen to represent Team Canada in the inaugural 1976 Canada Cup. Due to an overabundance of centremen, Canada's head coach Scotty Bowman chose to convert Dionne into a right winger. After witnessing Dionne's success in this position, Kings head coach Bob Pulford chose to keep him as a winger for the 1976–77 season. In this new role, Dionne and his linemates Tom Williams and Butch Goring became one of the highest-scoring lines that season. By the end of November, Dionne ranked third in league scoring with 13 goals and 23 assists. While he was occasionally benched by Pulford due to his defensive deficiencies, Dionne still ended December with 20 goals and 53 points. Despite his offensive success, Dionne was left off the original roster for the 1977 NHL All-Star Game before being personally selected by Wales Conference All-Stars coach Scotty Bowman. Following the All-Star Game, Dionne recorded his second hat-trick of the season to reach 40 goals and tie the Kings' franchise record for most goals in a single season, which he had set the previous year. In March, Dionne broke the Kings' franchise goal record and reached 100 points for the second time in his career. He finished the 1976–77 regular season with a career-high 53 goals and 69 assists for 122 points, while playing mostly as a right winger. In recognition of his efforts, Dionne became the first Los Angeles Kings player to be named to the NHL All-Star team at the end of the season. He also received the 1977 Seven Crowns of Sports award as the NHL's most consistent player and his second Lady Byng Memorial Trophy.

Dionne experienced a significant dip in his production level during the 1977–78 season. King's general manager George Maguire later stated that the team's experimenting with different linemates was to blame for Marcel's lack of scoring. Due to an injury to captain Mike Murphy early in the season, Dionne was named the Kings' acting captain. After the Kings acquired Syl Apps in a trade, coach Stewart moved Dionne to right wing and placed him on a line with Apps and Glenn Goldup. However, they did not spend an extended period of time together as Dionne suffered a shoulder injury on November 23. Over his two-week absence, Dionne continued to skate daily and practiced shooting the puck. Despite describing his shoulder as sore, he returned to the Kings' lineup on December 15 and recorded an assist that night against the Sabres. Dionne also continued to ice his shoulder between periods and after each game. Upon his return, the Kings moved Dionne between centerman and right wing alongside various linemates. He would occasionally center a line between Dave Taylor and Danny Grant, or serve as a winger to Apps. Despite his lack of consistency in the lineup, Dionne continued to lead the team in scoring. He finished the regular season with 36 goals and helped the Kings qualify for the first round of the 1978 Stanley Cup playoffs.

Dionne was named to Team Canada for the 1978 Ice Hockey World Championships and was elected team captain the night before the tournament began. After losing their opening game to Team Finland, Dionne and Team Canada won their next three consecutive contests. Dionne finished the tournament with three goals and 12 points through nine games as Team Canada clinched third place. Despite placing fifth in total scoring and receiving 42 votes, Dionne was not named to the Tournament's All-Star Team.

Dionne started the 1978–79 season playing alongside Taylor and newly acquired winger Murray Wilson. He accumulated five goals and 16 points through his first 10 games of the season, the best start of his career. Dionne continued to improve as the season progressed and set two new franchise recoreds by December. He became the first player in franchise history to record one goal in seven consecutive games and became the fastest Kings player to score 20 goals in a season. On January 13, 1979, coach Bob Berry put Dionne on a line with Charlie Simmer and Dave Taylor after the team scored one goal over three consecutive losses. The trio would soon be known as the "Triple Crown Line" due to their accomplishments. The trio remained a unit for six season until Simmer was traded to the Boston Bruins in 1984. In their first game together on January 13 against the Detroit Red Wings, Dionne scored four goals for the fifth time in his career. His second goal of the game was also his 300th career NHL goal.

Dionne signed a six-year, $3.6 million contract with the Kings before the start of the 1980–81 season. On January 7, 1981, Dionne recorded two goals and an assist against the Hartford Whalers to become the fastest NHL player to reach 1,000 points. He accomplished this feat in 740 games, 83 games faster than the previous record holder Phil Esposito.

On December 7, 1985, Dionne scored his 500th goal with the Kings organization to help the team beat the Winnipeg Jets.

Dionne was traded to the New York Rangers upon his request on March 10, 1987. The Kings sent Dionne, Jeff Crossman, and a third-round pick to the Rangers in exchange for Bobby Carpenter and Tom Laidlaw.

==== New York Rangers (1987–1989) ====
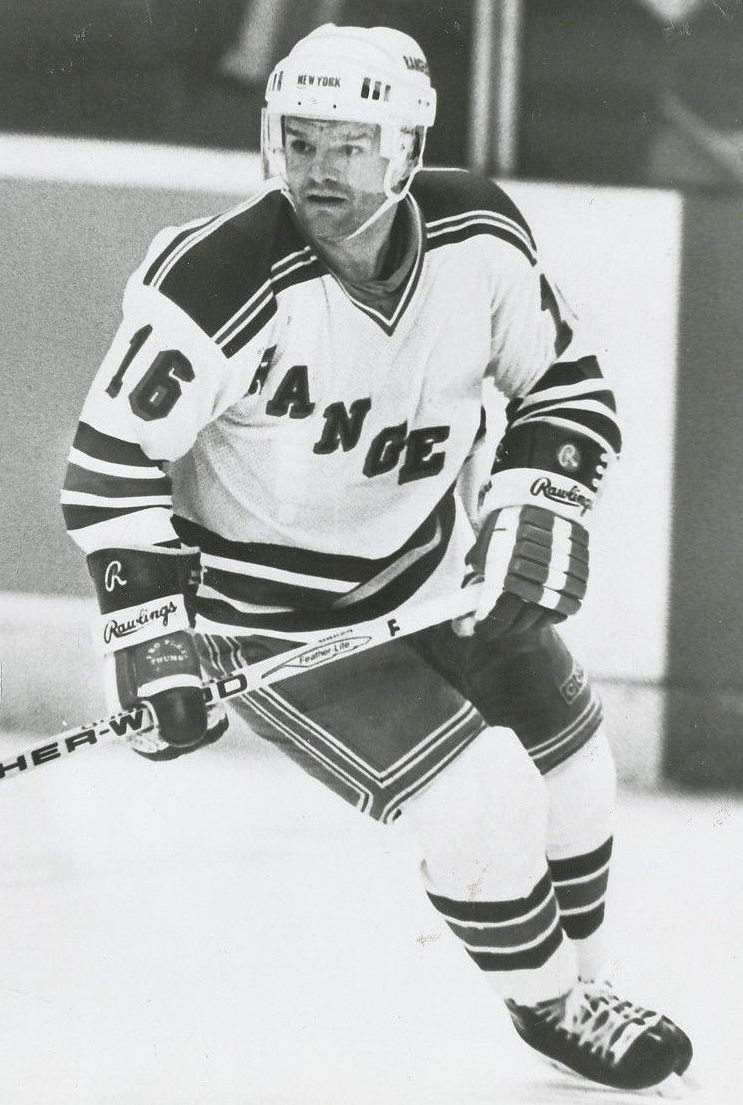
Dionne with the New York Rangers in 1987

Dionne played his remaining two and a half seasons with the Rangers.

On November 7, 1987, playing against the Kings, he recorded his 1,000th career assist, becoming the third player to reach the mark in NHL history. During his short tenure, the Rangers lost in the first round of the playoffs twice and missed the playoffs once.

In February 1989, Dionne and his agent asked Phil Esposito and coach Michel Bergeron to assign him to their minor league affiliate so he could get back into proper condition. They reluctantly agreed to the request when Dionne insisted that the move would not be degrading. Dionne was cut from the Rangers training camp roster ahead of the 1989–90 season. Rangers general manager Neil Smith said that the cut was a mutually agreed upon descison and they would explore the possibility of sending him to another team.

== Retirement and legacy ==
When Dionne retired, he was second all-time in goals and third all-time in assists and points. He was the first player to record seven 100-point seasons in NHL history, recording his seventh in the 1982–83 season. His eight 100-point seasons has only been surpassed by three other players in league history. Success, alongside roster consistency, eluded Dionne in the playoffs, as he played for sixteen different coaches in his eighteen seasons in the NHL and he played in just 49 playoff games.

Dionne has maintained a large business and investment portfolio since his playing days, owning the Blue Line Diner in Niagara Falls, operating a sports memorabilia store in Buffalo and buying and selling real estate. On November 8, 1990, his number 16 jersey was retired by the Kings, the second player to be honored by the team. He was the franchise leader in goals (550) and assists (757) until he was passed by Luc Robitaille and Anže Kopitar, respectively.

Dionne was inducted into the Hockey Hall of Fame in 1992. Prior to the start of the 1993–94 season, Dionne helped to create local interest in the ECHL's newest franchise, the South Carolina Stingrays. With the help of some young players, Dionne gave an on-ice demonstration of the rules of hockey to the southern audience. In 1998, he was ranked number 38 on The Hockey News' list of the 100 Greatest Hockey Players, the highest-ranking player to have not won a Stanley Cup since 2001 when No. 14-ranked Ray Bourque won with the Colorado Avalanche. The Centre Civique arena in Drummondville was renamed Centre Marcel-Dionne in his honour in 1980. In January 2004, Dionne was featured on a Canadian postage stamp. As part of the NHL All-Stars Collection, Dionne was immortalized along with five other All-Stars.

== Personal life ==
Dionne married St. Catharines native Carol Gaudet in Troy, Michigan in April 1974. They have three children together, two sons and one daughter. After he retired, the Dionne's settled in Buffalo and his sons, Drew and Garrett, played Junior B hockey for the Niagara Falls Canucks.

== Career statistics ==
=== Regular season and playoffs ===
Bold indicates led league

			Regular season					Playoffs
Season	Team	League	GP	G	A	Pts	PIM	GP	G	A	Pts	PIM
1967–68	Drummondville Rangers	QJHL	48	34	35	69	45	10	14	7	21	4
1967–68	Drummondville Rangers	M-Cup	—	—	—	—	—	4	9	4	13	5
1968–69	St. Catharines Black Hawks	OHA	48	37	63	100	38	18	15	20	35	8
1969–70	St. Catharines Black Hawks	OHA	54	55	77	132	46	10	12	20	32	10
1970–71	St. Catharines Black Hawks	OHA	46	62	81	143	20	15	29	26	55	11
1971–72	Detroit Red Wings	NHL	78	28	49	77	14	—	—	—	—	—
1972–73	Detroit Red Wings	NHL	77	40	50	90	21	—	—	—	—	—
1973–74	Detroit Red Wings	NHL	74	24	54	78	10	—	—	—	—	—
1974–75	Detroit Red Wings	NHL	**80**	47	74	121	14	—	—	—	—	—
1975–76	Los Angeles Kings	NHL	**80**	40	54	94	38	9	6	1	7	0
1976–77	Los Angeles Kings	NHL	**80**	53	69	122	12	9	5	9	14	2
1977–78	Los Angeles Kings	NHL	70	36	43	79	37	2	0	0	0	0
1978–79	Los Angeles Kings	NHL	**80**	59	71	130	30	2	0	1	1	0
1979–80	Los Angeles Kings	NHL	80	53	84	**137**	32	4	0	3	3	4
1980–81	Los Angeles Kings	NHL	80	58	77	135	70	4	1	3	4	7
1981–82	Los Angeles Kings	NHL	78	50	67	117	50	10	7	4	11	0
1982–83	Los Angeles Kings	NHL	**80**	56	51	107	22	—	—	—	—	—
1983–84	Los Angeles Kings	NHL	66	39	53	92	28	—	—	—	—	—
1984–85	Los Angeles Kings	NHL	**80**	46	80	126	46	3	1	2	3	2
1985–86	Los Angeles Kings	NHL	80	36	58	94	42	—	—	—	—	—
1986–87	Los Angeles Kings	NHL	**67**	24	50	74	54	—	—	—	—	—
1986–87	New York Rangers	NHL	**14**	4	6	10	6	6	1	1	2	2
1987–88	New York Rangers	NHL	67	31	34	65	54	—	—	—	—	—
1988–89	New York Rangers	NHL	37	7	16	23	20	—	—	—	—	—
1988–89	Denver Rangers	IHL	9	0	13	13	0	—	—	—	—	—
NHL totals			1,348	731	1,040	1,771	600	49	21	24	45	17

=== International ===
Year	Team	Event	GP	G	A	Pts	PIM
1976	Canada	CC	7	1	5	6	4
1978	Canada	WC	10	9	3	12	2
1979	Canada	WC	7	2	1	3	4
1981	Canada	CC	6	4	1	5	4
1983	Canada	WC	10	6	3	9	2
1986	Canada	WC	10	4	4	8	8
Senior totals			50	26	17	43	24

== Awards and honours ==
=== OHA ===
- 2× Eddie Powers Memorial Trophy winner – 1969–70, 1970–71
- OHA Second All-Star Team – 1969–70
- OHA First All-Star Team – 1970–71

=== NHL ===
- Lady Byng Memorial Trophy – 1975, 1977
- Lester B. Pearson Award – 1979, 1980
- Art Ross Trophy – 1980
- NHL All-Star Game – 1975, 1976, 1977, 1978, 1980, 1981, 1983, 1985
- NHL First All-Star Team – 1977, 1980
- NHL Second All-Star Team – 1979, 1981
- Ice Hockey World Championships Best Forward selection – 1978
- Inducted into the Hockey Hall of Fame in 1992

== See also ==
- List of NHL statistical leaders
- Notable families in the NHL
- List of NHL players with 1,000 points
- List of NHL players with 500 goals

== Notes ==
Preceded by Serge Lajeunesse	Detroit Red Wings first-round draft pick 1971	Succeeded by Terry Richardson
Preceded by Larry Johnston rotating captaincy ends	Detroit Red Wings captain 1974–75	Succeeded by Danny Grant
Preceded by John Bucyk; Jean Ratelle	Winner of the Lady Byng Trophy; 1975; 1977	Succeeded by Jean Ratelle; Butch Goring
Preceded by Guy Lafleur	Winner of the Lester B. Pearson Award; 1979, 1980	Succeeded by Mike Liut
Preceded by Bryan Trottier	Winner of the Art Ross Trophy; 1980	Succeeded by Wayne Gretzky
