= Andy Culligan =

Canadian ice hockey player

- Position: Forward
- Played for: IHL; Port Huron Flags
- NHL draft: 2nd overall, 1965; Chicago Blackhawks
- Playing career: 1968–1971

Andy Culligan is a Canadian retired professional ice hockey player. He was selected by the Chicago Blackhawks in the first round (second overall) of the 1965 NHL Amateur Draft.

Culligan played with the Port Huron Flags in the International Hockey League (IHL) during the 1968–69 season. He later played Canadian college hockey with St. Francis Xavier University.

Preceded by Richie Bayes	Chicago Blackhawks first-round draft pick 1965	Succeeded by Terry Caffery
