= George Forgie =

Canadian ice hockey player (born 1948)

- Born: February 24, 1948 (age 78) Winnipeg, Manitoba, Canada
- Height: 6 ft 0 in (183 cm)
- Weight: 201 lb (91 kg; 14 st 5 lb)
- Position: Defence
- Played for: Jacksonville Rockets; Johnstown Jets; Long Island Ducks; Jersey Devils
- NHL draft: 3rd overall, 1965; Detroit Red Wings
- Playing career: 1968–1978

George Forgie (born February 24, 1948) is a former professional Canadian ice hockey player. He was drafted third overall by the Detroit Red Wings in the 1965 NHL Amateur Draft.

== Playing career ==
Born in Winnipeg, Manitoba, Forgie played Defence for the Flin Flon Bombers of the Saskatchewan Junior Hockey League in the 1964–65 season before being drafted by the Red Wings in 1965. The Wings felt he needed more time to develop and so he would continue to play in numerous minor leagues and would never make it into the NHL.

After playing another season for the Bombers after the draft, Forgie moved to the WCHL to play a season for Winnipeg and then moved into the EHL where he would continue his journeyman status. He played for Jacksonville Rockets, Johnstown Jets, Long Island Ducks, and finally the Jersey Devils in 1970. Forgie played his final days of hockey with the Transcona Chargers of the Central Senior Hockey League in 1977.

== Awards ==
- (EHL) Most games played in one season (82 in 1968–69)

Preceded by Claude Gauthier	Detroit Red Wings first-round draft pick 1965	Succeeded by Steve Atkinson
