= Bob Birdsell =

Canadian ice hockey player (born 1947)

- Born: December 10, 1947 (age 78) Stettler, Alberta, Canada
- Height: 5 ft 10 in (178 cm)
- Weight: 190 lb (86 kg; 13 st 8 lb)
- Position: Right wing
- Played for: WHL; Salt Lake Golden Eagles; CHL; Kansas City Blues; Amarillo Wranglers; AHL; Hershey Bears
- National team: Canada
- NHL draft: 8th overall, 1965; Detroit Red Wings
- Playing career: 1969–1973

Bob Birdsell (born December 10, 1947) is a Canadian former professional ice hockey player. He was selected by the Detroit Red Wings in the second round (eighth overall) of the 1965 NHL Amateur Draft.

Birdsell played with the Canadian National Team before beginning his professional career in 1969 with the Salt Lake Golden Eagles of the Western Hockey League. He also played the 1970–71 season in the Central Hockey League with the Kansas City Blues and Amarillo Wranglers, and then played two seasons with the Hershey Bears of the American Hockey League before retiring following the 1972–73 season.
