= 1965 NHL amateur draft =

1965 North American ice hockey draft

General information
- Date: April 27, 1965
- Location: Queen Elizabeth Hotel; Montreal, Quebec, Canada

Overview
- 11 total selections in 3 rounds
- First selection: (Canada) Andre Veilleux (New York Rangers)

The 1965 NHL amateur draft was the third draft for the National Hockey League. It was a draft to assign unaffiliated amateur junior-age players to NHL teams. It was held on April 27, 1965, at the Queen Elizabeth Hotel in Montreal.

For the first time the eligibility rules were changed for the 1965 draft. The minimum age criterion was increased, to 18 from 16 years. Clubs were not permitted to begin negotiations with the selected players until they reached 19 years of age, and the date from which they were ineligible due to being on club sponsorship lists was pushed back from May 23 to April 1.

The NHL also reached an agreement with the AHL, CHL and WHL, allowing their clubs to participate in the draft. After the NHL clubs made their selections the clubs from the other three leagues were permitted to make their own selections. Each AHL and WHL club was allowed three picks, while each CHL team was allowed two.

The general consensus on the part of each participatory club was that the talent pool from which to draft was exceptionally poor. The majority of amateur players falling within the new age rules had already been sponsored, if not turned professional. 11 picks were made, which to this date remains the lowest ever in an NHL draft. Only two players played in the NHL: Pierre Bouchard, who played 595 NHL games from 1970 to 1982, and Michel Parizeau, who played 58 games in the 1971-1972 NHL season.

The pool of available player talent was considered so poor that the Toronto Maple Leafs elected not to participate whatsoever. The only non-NHL club to exercise their right to make a selection was the Pittsburgh Hornets of the AHL, who picked Junior C player Gary Beattie with the 11th, final pick.

== Selections by round ==
Below are listed the selections in the 1965 NHL amateur draft.

=== Round one ===
#	Player	Nationality	NHL team	College/junior/club team
1	Andre Veilleux (RW)	Canada	New York Rangers	Montreal Rangers (LHJAA)
2	Andy Culligan (F)	Canada	Chicago Black Hawks	St. Michael's Buzzers (MetJHL)
3	George Forgie (D)	Canada	Detroit Red Wings	Flin Flon Bombers (SJHL)
4	Joe Bailey (F)	Canada	Boston Bruins	St. Thomas Barons (WOJHL)
5	Pierre Bouchard (D)	Canada	Montreal Canadiens	St. Vincent de Paul Saints (LHJAA)

=== Round two ===
#	Player	Nationality	NHL team	College/junior/club team
6	George Surmay (G)	Canada	New York Rangers	Kelvin Midgets (MAAAMHL)
7	Brian McKenney (RW)	Canada	Chicago Black Hawks	Smith Falls Bears (CJAHL)
8	Bob Birdsell (RW)	Canada	Detroit Red Wings	Stettler Midgets (MAAAMHL)
9	Bill Ramsay (F)	Canada	Boston Bruins	Winnipeg Monarchs (MJHL)

=== Round three ===
#	Player	Nationality	NHL team	College/junior/club team
10	Michel Parizeau (C)	Canada	New York Rangers	Montreal Rangers (LHJAA)
11	Gary Beattie (F)	Canada	Pittsburgh Hornets (AHL)	Gananoque Lakers (MWJCHL)

== See also ==
- 1965–66 NHL season
- List of NHL players
