= Robert Forgie =

17th-century priest in Ireland

Robert Forgie was an Anglican priest in Ireland during the 17th century.

Forgie was Precentor of Killala Cathedral from 1626 to 1636; and Dean of Killala from then until his murder on 23 February 1642.
