= 1997–98 Pittsburgh Penguins season =

NHL team season

1997–98 Pittsburgh Penguins
- Northeast Division champions
- Division: 1st Northeast
- Conference: 2nd Eastern
- 1997–98 record: 40–24–18
- Home record: 21–10–10
- Road record: 19–14–8
- Goals for: 228
- Goals against: 188

Team information
- General manager: Craig Patrick
- Coach: Kevin Constantine
- Captain: Ron Francis
- Alternate captains: Kevin Hatcher; Jaromir Jagr
- Arena: Pittsburgh Civic Arena
- Average attendance: 15,070
- Minor league affiliates: Syracuse Crunch; Johnstown Chiefs

Team leaders
- Goals: Jaromir Jagr (35)
- Assists: Jaromir Jagr (67)
- Points: Jaromir Jagr (102)
- Penalty minutes: Chris Tamer (181)
- Plus/minus: Jaromir Jagr (+17)
- Wins: Tom Barrasso (31)
- Goals against average: Peter Skudra (1.83)

The 1997–98 Pittsburgh Penguins season was the team's 31st in the National Hockey League (NHL). It was their first season under Head Coach Kevin Constantine and first after the initial retirement of Mario Lemieux.

== Offseason ==
Following the 1996–97 season which saw their Hall of Fame star Mario Lemieux retire, the Penguins attempted to continue keeping their recent success. Over the previous nine seasons, no NHL team had been more successful than Pittsburgh in terms of regular season points, although the team had not won a Stanley Cup since 1992 (part of the reason why Head Coach Eddie Johnston was asked to resign down following the 1996–97 season). Former San Jose Sharks Head Coach Kevin Constantine was hired as Johnston's successor, promising to replace his predecessor's free-form style of play with a more disciplined approach. Additionally, Ron Francis was named captain in Lemieux's absence, and the team acquired center Martin Straka via free agency to add offense. The team also acquired the rights to defensive-defenseman Jiri Slegr, who had spent the 1996–97 season playing for Sodertalje SK in Sweden.

== Regular season ==
The Penguins tied the Chicago Blackhawks, Florida Panthers and New York Islanders for most short-handed goals allowed, with 16.

=== Final standings ===
Northeast Division
No.	CR		GP	W	L	T	GF	GA	Pts
1	2	**Pittsburgh Penguins**	82	40	24	18	228	188	98
2	5	**Boston Bruins**	82	39	30	13	221	194	91
3	6	**Buffalo Sabres**	82	36	29	17	211	187	89
4	7	**Montreal Canadiens**	82	37	32	13	235	208	87
5	8	**Ottawa Senators**	82	34	33	15	193	200	83
6	9	Carolina Hurricanes	82	33	41	8	200	219	74

Eastern Conference
R		Div	GP	W	L	T	GF	GA	Pts
**1**	**New Jersey Devils**	**ATL**	**82**	**48**	**23**	**11**	**225**	**166**	**107**
**2**	**Pittsburgh Penguins**	**NE**	**82**	**40**	**24**	**18**	**228**	**188**	**98**
**3**	**Philadelphia Flyers**	**ATL**	**82**	**42**	**29**	**11**	**242**	**193**	**95**
**4**	**Washington Capitals**	**ATL**	**82**	**40**	**30**	**12**	**219**	**202**	**92**
**5**	**Boston Bruins**	**NE**	**82**	**39**	**30**	**13**	**221**	**194**	**91**
**6**	**Buffalo Sabres**	**NE**	**82**	**36**	**29**	**17**	**211**	**187**	**89**
**7**	**Montreal Canadiens**	**NE**	**82**	**37**	**32**	**13**	**235**	**208**	**87**
**8**	**Ottawa Senators**	**NE**	**82**	**34**	**33**	**15**	**193**	**200**	**83**
9	Carolina Hurricanes	NE	82	33	41	8	200	219	74
10	New York Islanders	ATL	82	30	41	11	212	225	71
11	New York Rangers	ATL	82	25	39	18	197	231	68
12	Florida Panthers	ATL	82	24	43	15	203	256	63
13	Tampa Bay Lightning	ATL	82	17	55	10	151	269	44

Divisions: ATL – Atlantic, NE – Northeast

bold – Qualified for playoffs

== Schedule and results ==
=== Regular season ===
1997–98 regular season
October: 7–5–2 (home: 1–2–1; road: 6–3–1), 16 points

#	Date	Visitor	Score	Home	Record	Points	Recap
1	October 1	Los Angeles Kings	3–3	Pittsburgh Penguins	0–0–1	1	T
2	October 3	Pittsburgh Penguins	4–3	Carolina Hurricanes	1–0–1	3	W
3	October 4	Florida Panthers	5–3	Pittsburgh Penguins	1–1–1	3	L
4	October 8	Montreal Canadiens	3–0	Pittsburgh Penguins	1–2–1	3	L
5	October 9	Pittsburgh Penguins	1–3	Philadelphia Flyers	1–3–1	3	L
6	October 11	Carolina Hurricanes	1–4	Pittsburgh Penguins	2–3–1	5	W
7	October 14	Pittsburgh Penguins	1–0	New York Rangers	3–3–1	7	W
8	October 15	Pittsburgh Penguins	1–1	Montreal Canadiens	3–3–2	8	T
9	October 17	Pittsburgh Penguins	4–1	Tampa Bay Lightning	4–3–2	10	W
10	October 19	Pittsburgh Penguins	4–1	Florida Panthers	5–3–2	12	W
11	October 22	Pittsburgh Penguins	5–2	San Jose Sharks	6–3–2	14	W
12	October 24	Pittsburgh Penguins	3–4	Edmonton Oilers	6–4–2	14	L
13	October 25	Pittsburgh Penguins	3–2 OT	Vancouver Canucks	7–4–2	16	W
14	October 28	Pittsburgh Penguins	3–6	Calgary Flames	7–5–2	16	L

November: 7–4–3 (home: 5–2–2; road: 2–2–1), 17 points

#	Date	Visitor	Score	Home	Record	Points	Recap
15	November 1	Vancouver Canucks	6–7 OT	Pittsburgh Penguins	8–5–2	18	W
16	November 2	Pittsburgh Penguins	1–3	Chicago Blackhawks	8–6–2	18	L
17	November 5	Dallas Stars	5–2	Pittsburgh Penguins	8–7–2	18	L
18	November 7	Pittsburgh Penguins	1–1	Detroit Red Wings	8–7–3	19	T
19	November 8	Buffalo Sabres	2–2	Pittsburgh Penguins	8–7–4	20	T
20	November 12	Washington Capitals	4–1	Pittsburgh Penguins	8–8–4	20	L
21	November 14	Pittsburgh Penguins	1–3	New York Rangers	8–9–4	20	L
22	November 15	Pittsburgh Penguins	5–0	Toronto Maple Leafs	9–9–4	22	W
23	November 19	Boston Bruins	3–3	Pittsburgh Penguins	9–9–5	23	T
24	November 20	Pittsburgh Penguins	2–0	Ottawa Senators	10–9–5	25	W
25	November 22	New York Rangers	3–4 OT	Pittsburgh Penguins	11–9–5	27	W
26	November 24	Buffalo Sabres	1–5	Pittsburgh Penguins	12–9–5	29	W
27	November 26	Carolina Hurricanes	2–3	Pittsburgh Penguins	13–9–5	31	W
28	November 29	Montreal Canadiens	3–6	Pittsburgh Penguins	14–9–5	33	W

December: 7–3–3 (home: 3–2–1; road: 4–1–2), 17 points

#	Date	Visitor	Score	Home	Record	Points	Recap
29	December 1	Pittsburgh Penguins	1–0	Montreal Canadiens	15–9–5	35	W
30	December 4	New Jersey Devils	4–0	Pittsburgh Penguins	15–10–5	35	L
31	December 6	Mighty Ducks of Anaheim	2–5	Pittsburgh Penguins	16–10–5	37	W
32	December 9	Pittsburgh Penguins	2–1	Los Angeles Kings	17–10–5	39	W
33	December 10	Pittsburgh Penguins	3–0	Mighty Ducks of Anaheim	18–10–5	41	W
34	December 12	Pittsburgh Penguins	2–2	Phoenix Coyotes	18–10–6	42	T
35	December 16	Tampa Bay Lightning	1–1	Pittsburgh Penguins	18–10–7	43	T
36	December 19	Pittsburgh Penguins	3–3	Colorado Avalanche	18–10–8	44	T
37	December 20	Pittsburgh Penguins	1–4	St. Louis Blues	18–11–8	44	L
38	December 26	Pittsburgh Penguins	4–1	Washington Capitals	19–11–8	46	W
39	December 27	Montreal Canadiens	1–0	Pittsburgh Penguins	19–12–8	46	L
40	December 29	New York Islanders	1–5	Pittsburgh Penguins	20–12–8	48	W
41	December 31	Carolina Hurricanes	2–3	Pittsburgh Penguins	21–12–8	50	W

January: 8–3–2 (home: 4–1–1; road: 4–2–1), 18 points

#	Date	Visitor	Score	Home	Record	Points	Recap
42	January 3	Colorado Avalanche	5–4 OT	Pittsburgh Penguins	21–13–8	50	L
43	January 6	Pittsburgh Penguins	4–2	New York Islanders	22–13–8	52	W
44	January 7	Pittsburgh Penguins	1–3	New Jersey Devils	22–14–8	52	L
45	January 10	New Jersey Devils	1–4	Pittsburgh Penguins	23–14–8	54	W
46	January 12	Pittsburgh Penguins	4–1	Carolina Hurricanes	24–14–8	56	W
47	January 14	Pittsburgh Penguins	2–5	Boston Bruins	24–15–8	56	L
48	January 20	Ottawa Senators	0–0	Pittsburgh Penguins	24–15–9	57	T
49	January 22	Pittsburgh Penguins	3–2	New Jersey Devils	25–15–9	59	W
50	January 24	Boston Bruins	2–4	Pittsburgh Penguins	26–15–9	61	W
51	January 26	St. Louis Blues	2–4	Pittsburgh Penguins	27–15–9	63	W
52	January 28	Pittsburgh Penguins	2–2	Washington Capitals	27–15–10	64	T
53	January 29	Pittsburgh Penguins	4–2	Boston Bruins	28–15–10	66	W
54	January 31	Detroit Red Wings	2–4	Pittsburgh Penguins	29–15–10	68	W

February: 1–2–3 (home: 0–1–1; road: 1–1–2), 5 points

#	Date	Visitor	Score	Home	Record	Points	Recap
55	February 2	New York Islanders	4–2	Pittsburgh Penguins	29–16–10	68	L
56	February 4	Washington Capitals	2–2	Pittsburgh Penguins	29–16–11	69	T
57	February 6	Pittsburgh Penguins	2–2	Buffalo Sabres	29–16–12	70	T
58	February 7	Pittsburgh Penguins	2–2	Ottawa Senators	29–16–13	71	T
59	February 25	Pittsburgh Penguins	6–2	Montreal Canadiens	30–16–13	73	W
60	February 28	Pittsburgh Penguins	2–6	Boston Bruins	30–17–13	73	L

March: 6–3–4 (home: 6–0–3; road: 0–3–1), 16 points

#	Date	Visitor	Score	Home	Record	Points	Recap
61	March 2	Toronto Maple Leafs	1–3	Pittsburgh Penguins	31–17–13	75	W
62	March 5	Chicago Blackhawks	2–2	Pittsburgh Penguins	31–17–14	76	T
63	March 7	Philadelphia Flyers	4–6	Pittsburgh Penguins	32–17–14	78	W
64	March 8	Pittsburgh Penguins	3–4 OT	Philadelphia Flyers	32–18–14	78	L
65	March 11	Calgary Flames	1–4	Pittsburgh Penguins	33–18–14	80	W
66	March 14	Buffalo Sabres	1–2	Pittsburgh Penguins	34–18–14	82	W
67	March 15	Pittsburgh Penguins	0–3	Buffalo Sabres	34–19–14	82	L
68	March 18	Edmonton Oilers	2–4	Pittsburgh Penguins	35–19–14	84	W
69	March 21	Philadelphia Flyers	3–4	Pittsburgh Penguins	36–19–14	86	W
70	March 22	Pittsburgh Penguins	0–0	Dallas Stars	36–19–15	87	T
71	March 26	Pittsburgh Penguins	3–4	New York Islanders	36–20–15	87	L
72	March 28	New York Rangers	2–2	Pittsburgh Penguins	36–20–16	88	T
73	March 29	Ottawa Senators	1–1	Pittsburgh Penguins	36–20–17	89	T

April: 4–4–1 (home: 2–2–1; road: 2–2–0), 9 points

#	Date	Visitor	Score	Home	Record	Points	Recap
74	April 1	San Jose Sharks	3–2	Pittsburgh Penguins	36–21–17	89	L
75	April 4	Pittsburgh Penguins	4–1	Tampa Bay Lightning	37–21–17	91	W
76	April 5	Pittsburgh Penguins	1–3	Florida Panthers	37–22–17	91	L
77	April 7	Phoenix Coyotes	2–1	Pittsburgh Penguins	37–23–17	91	L
78	April 9	Pittsburgh Penguins	1–4	Ottawa Senators	37–24–17	91	L
79	April 11	Florida Panthers	3–3	Pittsburgh Penguins	37–24–18	92	T
80	April 15	Tampa Bay Lightning	1–5	Pittsburgh Penguins	38–24–18	94	W
81	April 16	Pittsburgh Penguins	4–1	Carolina Hurricanes	39–24–18	96	W
82	April 18	Boston Bruins	2–5	Pittsburgh Penguins	40–24–18	98	W

Legend: W Win (2 points) L Loss (0 points) T Tie (1 point)

=== Playoffs ===
1998 Stanley Cup playoffs
Eastern Conference Quarterfinals vs. (7) Montreal Canadiens – Canadiens win 4–2

Game	Date	Visitor	Score	Home	Series	Recap
1	April 23	Montreal Canadiens	3–2 (OT)	Pittsburgh Penguins	0–1	L
2	April 25	Montreal Canadiens	1–4	Pittsburgh Penguins	1–1	W
3	April 27	Pittsburgh Penguins	1–3	Montreal Canadiens	1–2	L
4	April 29	Pittsburgh Penguins	6–3	Montreal Canadiens	2–2	W
5	May 1	Montreal Canadiens	5–2	Pittsburgh Penguins	2–3	L
6	May 3	Pittsburgh Penguins	0–3	Montreal Canadiens	2–4	L

Legend: W Win L Loss

== Player statistics ==
Skaters

Regular season
Player	GP	G	A	Pts	+/−	PIM
Jaromir Jagr	77	35	67	102	17	64
Ron Francis	81	25	62	87	12	20
Stu Barnes	78	30	35	65	15	30
Kevin Hatcher	74	19	29	48	-3	66
Martin Straka	75	19	23	42	-1	28
Rob Brown	82	15	25	40	-1	59
Fredrik Olausson	76	6	27	33	13	42
Aleksey Morozov	76	13	13	26	-4	8
Eddie Olczyk	56	11	11	22	-9	35
Robert Lang^{†}	51	9	13	22	6	14
Alex Hicks	58	7	13	20	4	54
Brad Werenka	71	3	15	18	15	46
Jiri Slegr	73	5	12	17	10	109
Andreas Johansson	50	5	10	15	4	20
Darius Kasparaitis	81	4	8	12	3	127
Robert Dome	30	5	2	7	-1	12
Tyler Wright	82	3	4	7	-3	112
Peter Ferraro^{‡}	29	3	4	7	-2	12
Chris Ferraro	46	3	4	7	-2	43
Ian Moran	37	1	6	7	0	19
Chris Tamer	79	0	7	7	4	181
Neil Wilkinson	34	2	4	6	0	24
Garry Valk	39	2	1	3	-3	33
Tuomas Gronman	22	1	2	3	3	25
Greg Johnson^{‡}	5	1	0	1	0	2
Sean Pronger^{†}	5	1	0	1	-1	2
Sven Butenschon	8	0	0	0	-1	6
Total		228	397	625	—	1,193

Playoffs
Player	GP	G	A	Pts	+/−	PIM
Jaromir Jagr	6	4	5	9	5	2
Stu Barnes	6	3	3	6	2	2
Ron Francis	6	1	5	6	5	2
Jiri Slegr	6	0	4	4	3	2
Fredrik Olausson	6	0	3	3	0	2
Robert Lang	6	0	3	3	-4	2
Eddie Olczyk	6	2	0	2	-3	4
Martin Straka	6	2	0	2	-3	2
Rob Brown	6	1	0	1	-4	4
Kevin Hatcher	6	1	0	1	1	12
Brad Werenka	6	1	0	1	-3	8
Chris Tamer	6	0	1	1	-1	4
Tyler Wright	6	0	1	1	0	4
Aleksey Morozov	6	0	1	1	-3	2
Ian Moran	6	0	0	0	-1	2
Sean Pronger	5	0	0	0	-1	4
Andreas Johansson	1	0	0	0	0	0
Darius Kasparaitis	5	0	0	0	-2	8
Tuomas Gronman	1	0	0	0	0	0
Alex Hicks	6	0	0	0	-5	2
Total		15	26	41	—	68

Goaltenders

Regular season
Player	GP	GS	TOI	W	L	T	GA	GAA	SA	SV%	SO	G	A	PIM
Tom Barrasso	63	61	3542:07	31	14	13	122	2.07	1556	0.922	7	0	2	14
Peter Skudra	17	12	851:23	6	4	3	26	1.83	341	0.924	0	0	1	2
Ken Wregget	15	9	611:26	3	6	2	28	2.75	293	0.904	0	0	0	6
Total		82	5004:56	40	24	18	176	2.11	2190	0.920	7	0	3	22

Playoffs
Player	GP	GS	TOI	W	L	T	GA	GAA	SA	SV%	SO	G	A	PIM
Tom Barrasso	6	6	376:19	2	4	0	17	2.71	171	0.901	0	0	0	2
Total		6	376:19	2	4	0	17	2.71	171	0.901	0	0	0	2

^{†}Denotes player spent time with another team before joining the Penguins. Stats reflect time with the Penguins only.
^{‡}Denotes player was traded mid-season. Stats reflect time with the Penguins only.

== Awards and records ==
=== Awards ===
Type	Award/honor	Recipient	Ref
League (annual)	Art Ross Trophy	Jaromir Jagr	
League (annual)	Lady Byng Memorial Trophy	Ron Francis	
League (annual)	NHL First All-Star Team	Jaromir Jagr (Right wing)	
League (in-season)	NHL All-Star Game selection	Jaromir Jagr (Note: Jagr was voted to the starting lineup, earning more votes than any other player.)	
Team	A. T. Caggiano Memorial Booster Club Award	Jaromir Jagr	
Team	Aldege "Baz" Bastien Memorial Good Guy Award	Ron Francis	
Team	Bob Johnson Memorial Badger Bob Award	Ron Francis	
Team	Leading Scorer Award	Jaromir Jagr	
Team	Michel Briere Memorial Rookie of the Year Trophy	Peter Skudra	
Team	Most Valuable Player Award	Ron Francis	
Team	Most Valuable Player Award	Jaromir Jagr	
Team	Players' Player Award	Ron Francis	
Team	The Edward J. DeBartolo Community Service Award	Chris Tamer	
Team	The Edward J. DeBartolo Community Service Award	Tyler Wright	

=== Milestones ===
Milestone	Player	Date	Ref
First game	Robert Dome	October 1, 1997	
First game	Alexei Morozov	October 1, 1997	
First game	Sven Butenschon	October 19, 1997	
First game	Peter Skudra	November 5, 1997	
25th shutout	Tom Barrasso	November 15, 1997	

== Transactions ==
The Penguins have been involved in the following transactions during the 1997–98 season:

=== Trades ===
August 12, 1997	To Edmonton Oilers 1998 3rd-round pick	To Pittsburgh Penguins Jiri Slegr
September 24, 1997	To Buffalo Sabres Jason Woolley	To Pittsburgh Penguins 1998 5th-round pick
September 28, 1997	To Colorado Avalanche Francois Leroux	To Pittsburgh Penguins 1998 3rd-round pick
October 27, 1997	To Chicago Blackhawks Greg Johnson	To Pittsburgh Penguins Tuomas Gronman
March 24, 1998	To Anaheim Ducks rights to Patrick Lalime	To Pittsburgh Penguins Sean Pronger
June 16, 1998	To Edmonton Oilers rights to Josef Beranek	To Pittsburgh Penguins Bobby Dollas; Tony Hrkac
June 17, 1998	To Calgary Flames David Roche; Ken Wregget	To Pittsburgh Penguins Todd Hlushko; German Titov

=== Free agents ===
Player	Acquired from	Lost to	Date
Brad Werenka	Chicago Blackhawks		July 31, 1997
Jeff Christian		Phoenix Coyotes	August 4, 1997
Martin Straka	Florida Panthers		August 6, 1997
Robert Lang	HC Sparta Praha		September 2, 1997
Peter Skudra	Edmonton Oilers		September 25, 1997
Drake Berehowsky		Edmonton Oilers	September 30, 1997
Rob Brown	Chicago Wolves		October 1, 1997

=== Waivers ===
Player	Acquired from	Lost to	Date
Robert Lang		Boston Bruins	September 28, 1997
Peter Ferraro	New York Rangers		October 1, 1997
Chris Ferraro	New York Rangers		October 1, 1997
Robert Lang	Boston Bruins		October 25, 1997
Peter Ferraro		New York Rangers	January 14, 1998
Tony Hrkac		Nashville Predators	June 26, 1998

=== Retained ===
Player	Details	Date
Ian Moran	Resigned	August 1, 1997
Joe Dziedzic	Resigned	September 10, 1997
Alexei Morozov	Signed rookie contract	September 24, 1997
Jaromir Jagr	Resigned	January 27, 1998
Peter Skudra	Resigned	June 17, 1998

== Draft picks ==
The Penguins drafted the following players at the 1997 NHL entry draft at the Civic Arena in Pittsburgh:

Round	#	Player	Pos	Nationality	College/Junior/Club team (League)
1	17	Robert Dome	Left wing	Slovakia	Las Vegas Thunder (IHL)
2	44	Brian Gaffaney	Defense	United States	North Iowa Huskies (USHL)
3	71	Josef Melichar	Defense	Czech Republic	HC Ceske Budejovice (Czech)
4	97	Alexandre Mathieu	Center	Canada	Halifax Mooseheads (QMJHL)
5	124	Harlan Pratt	Defense	Canada	Prince Albert Raiders (WHL)
6	152	Petr Havelka	Left wing	Czech Republic	Sparta Prague (Czech)
7	179	Mark Moore	Defense	Canada	Harvard University (ECACHL)
8	208	Andrew Ference	Defense	Canada	Portland Winter Hawks (WHL)
9	234	Eric Lind	Defense	United States	Avon Old Farms (USHS–CT)

== Farm teams ==
The Johnstown Chiefs of the East Coast Hockey League finished last overall in the Northern Conference with a record of 23–41–6.

The American Hockey League (AHL)'s Syracuse Crunch finished in third place in the Empire State Division with a record of 35–32–11–2 record. They were eliminated by the Hamilton Bulldogs in the first round of the playoffs.

== See also ==
- 1997–98 NHL season
