= 1997–98 Montreal Canadiens season =

NHL hockey team season

1997–98 Montreal Canadiens
- Division: 4th Northeast
- Conference: 7th Eastern
- 1997–98 record: 37–32–13
- Home record: 15–17–9
- Road record: 22–15–4
- Goals for: 235
- Goals against: 208

Team information
- General manager: Rejean Houle
- Coach: Alain Vigneault
- Captain: Vincent Damphousse
- Arena: Molson Centre
- Average attendance: 20,771 (97.6%)
- Minor league affiliates: Fredericton Canadiens; New Orleans Brass

Team leaders
- Goals: Mark Recchi (32)
- Assists: Saku Koivu (43)
- Points: Mark Recchi (74)
- Penalty minutes: Scott Thornton (158)
- Plus/minus: Dave Manson (+22)
- Wins: Jocelyn Thibault (19)
- Goals against average: Jocelyn Thibault (2.47)

The 1997–98 Montreal Canadiens season was the club's 89th season of play. The Canadiens made the playoffs and advanced to the Conference Semifinals after winning 4 games to 2 in Conference Quarterfinals against the Pittsburgh Penguins, their first playoff series win since the 1992–93 Stanley Cup title year. However, in the Conference semifinals, they were swept in four games by the Buffalo Sabres.

== Regular season ==
=== Final standings ===
Northeast Division
No.	CR		GP	W	L	T	GF	GA	Pts
1	2	**Pittsburgh Penguins**	82	40	24	18	228	188	98
2	5	**Boston Bruins**	82	39	30	13	221	194	91
3	6	**Buffalo Sabres**	82	36	29	17	211	187	89
4	7	**Montreal Canadiens**	82	37	32	13	235	208	87
5	8	**Ottawa Senators**	82	34	33	15	193	200	83
6	9	Carolina Hurricanes	82	33	41	8	200	219	74

Eastern Conference
R		Div	GP	W	L	T	GF	GA	Pts
**1**	**New Jersey Devils**	**ATL**	**82**	**48**	**23**	**11**	**225**	**166**	**107**
**2**	**Pittsburgh Penguins**	**NE**	**82**	**40**	**24**	**18**	**228**	**188**	**98**
**3**	**Philadelphia Flyers**	**ATL**	**82**	**42**	**29**	**11**	**242**	**193**	**95**
**4**	**Washington Capitals**	**ATL**	**82**	**40**	**30**	**12**	**219**	**202**	**92**
**5**	**Boston Bruins**	**NE**	**82**	**39**	**30**	**13**	**221**	**194**	**91**
**6**	**Buffalo Sabres**	**NE**	**82**	**36**	**29**	**17**	**211**	**187**	**89**
**7**	**Montreal Canadiens**	**NE**	**82**	**37**	**32**	**13**	**235**	**208**	**87**
**8**	**Ottawa Senators**	**NE**	**82**	**34**	**33**	**15**	**193**	**200**	**83**
9	Carolina Hurricanes	NE	82	33	41	8	200	219	74
10	New York Islanders	ATL	82	30	41	11	212	225	71
11	New York Rangers	ATL	82	25	39	18	197	231	68
12	Florida Panthers	ATL	82	24	43	15	203	256	63
13	Tampa Bay Lightning	ATL	82	17	55	10	151	269	44

Divisions: ATL – Atlantic, NE – Northeast

bold – Qualified for playoffs

== Schedule and results ==
=== Regular season ===
1997–98 regular season
October: 6–4–2 (home: 2–3–2; road: 4–1–0)

Game	Date	Score	Opponent	Record	Recap
1	October 1, 1997	2–2 OT	Ottawa Senators	0–0–1	T
2	October 4, 1997	4–1	@ Boston Bruins	1–0–1	W
3	October 8, 1997	3–0	@ Pittsburgh Penguins	2–0–1	W
4	October 11, 1997	2–6	Philadelphia Flyers	2–1–1	L
5	October 15, 1997	1–1 OT	Pittsburgh Penguins	2–1–2	T
6	October 17, 1997	5–1	@ Buffalo Sabres	3–1–2	W
7	October 18, 1997	2–3	Washington Capitals	3–2–2	L
8	October 22, 1997	3–0	Florida Panthers	4–2–2	W
9	October 23, 1997	1–2 OT	@ New Jersey Devils	4–3–2	L
10	October 25, 1997	4–2	@ Ottawa Senators	5–3–2	W
11	October 27, 1997	4–2	Chicago Blackhawks	6–3–2	W
12	October 29, 1997	2–5	New York Islanders	6–4–2	L

November: 9–5–1 (home: 4–2–1; road: 5–3–0)

Game	Date	Score	Opponent	Record	Recap
13	November 1, 1997	5–1	Toronto Maple Leafs	7–4–2	W
14	November 3, 1997	6–4	Dallas Stars	8–4–2	W
15	November 5, 1997	4–2	Phoenix Coyotes	9–4–2	W
16	November 7, 1997	4–3	@ San Jose Sharks	10–4–2	W
17	November 8, 1997	4–1	@ Los Angeles Kings	11–4–2	W
18	November 12, 1997	4–3 OT	@ Mighty Ducks of Anaheim	12–4–2	W
19	November 13, 1997	5–2	@ Phoenix Coyotes	13–4–2	W
20	November 15, 1997	2–3	Washington Capitals	13–5–2	L
21	November 17, 1997	4–1	Tampa Bay Lightning	14–5–2	W
22	November 19, 1997	1–2	@ Carolina Hurricanes	14–6–2	L
23	November 22, 1997	2–5	Detroit Red Wings	14–7–2	L
24	November 24, 1997	2–2 OT	San Jose Sharks	14–7–3	T
25	November 26, 1997	6–5	@ Washington Capitals	15–7–3	W
26	November 28, 1997	0–2	@ Detroit Red Wings	15–8–3	L
27	November 29, 1997	3–6	@ Pittsburgh Penguins	15–9–3	L

December: 6–6–3 (home: 4–2–2; road: 2–4–1)

Game	Date	Score	Opponent	Record	Recap
28	December 1, 1997	0–1	Pittsburgh Penguins	15–10–3	L
29	December 3, 1997	2–0	Los Angeles Kings	16–10–3	W
30	December 6, 1997	3–3 OT	New York Rangers	16–10–4	T
31	December 8, 1997	4–2	Colorado Avalanche	17–10–4	W
32	December 10, 1997	4–3 OT	St. Louis Blues	18–10–4	W
33	December 12, 1997	2–5	@ New Jersey Devils	18–11–4	L
34	December 13, 1997	2–4	@ Boston Bruins	18–12–4	L
35	December 15, 1997	1–3	Philadelphia Flyers	18–13–4	L
36	December 19, 1997	0–1	@ Buffalo Sabres	18–14–4	L
37	December 20, 1997	4–1	Ottawa Senators	19–14–4	W
38	December 22, 1997	3–3 OT	Edmonton Oilers	19–14–5	T
39	December 23, 1997	3–4 OT	@ Ottawa Senators	19–15–5	L
40	December 27, 1997	1–0	@ Pittsburgh Penguins	20–15–5	W
41	December 29, 1997	1–1 OT	@ Colorado Avalanche	20–15–6	T
42	December 31, 1997	3–2	@ Calgary Flames	21–15–6	W

January: 6–4–1 (home: 1–4–0; road: 5–0–1)

Game	Date	Score	Opponent	Record	Recap
43	January 2, 1998	5–3	@ Edmonton Oilers	22–15–6	W
44	January 3, 1998	4–2	@ Vancouver Canucks	23–15–6	W
45	January 7, 1998	1–2 OT	Boston Bruins	23–16–6	L
46	January 8, 1998	8–2	@ New York Islanders	24–16–6	W
47	January 12, 1998	6–3	@ Tampa Bay Lightning	25–16–6	W
48	January 14, 1998	3–3 OT	@ Philadelphia Flyers	25–16–7	T
49	January 21, 1998	4–2	Boston Bruins	26–16–7	W
50	January 24, 1998	3–4	Carolina Hurricanes	26–17–7	L
51	January 25, 1998	1–3	New Jersey Devils	26–18–7	L
52	January 29, 1998	3–2	@ Philadelphia Flyers	27–18–7	W
53	January 31, 1998	3–4	Ottawa Senators	27–19–7	L

February: 1–4–0 (home: 0–2–0; road: 1–2–0)

Game	Date	Score	Opponent	Record	Recap
54	February 1, 1998	6–3	@ Carolina Hurricanes	28–19–7	W
55	February 4, 1998	2–4	@ New York Islanders	28–20–7	L
56	February 7, 1998	1–4	Buffalo Sabres	28–21–7	L
57	February 25, 1998	2–6	Pittsburgh Penguins	28–22–7	L
58	February 28, 1998	0–4	@ Toronto Maple Leafs	28–23–7	L

March: 6–6–3 (home: 4–2–2; road: 2–4–1)

Game	Date	Score	Opponent	Record	Recap
59	March 4, 1998	3–1	@ Dallas Stars	29–23–7	W
60	March 5, 1998	0–4	@ St. Louis Blues	29–24–7	L
61	March 7, 1998	1–2	Buffalo Sabres	29–25–7	L
62	March 9, 1998	6–1	Florida Panthers	30–25–7	W
63	March 11, 1998	2–2 OT	Vancouver Canucks	30–25–8	T
64	March 12, 1998	4–1	New York Rangers	31–25–8	W
65	March 14, 1998	4–2	New Jersey Devils	32–25–8	W
66	March 16, 1998	3–3 OT	Calgary Flames	32–25–9	T
67	March 18, 1998	1–2 OT	@ New York Rangers	32–26–9	L
68	March 19, 1998	0–1	@ Chicago Blackhawks	32–27–9	L
69	March 21, 1998	4–5	Mighty Ducks of Anaheim	32–28–9	L
70	March 25, 1998	2–1 OT	@ Tampa Bay Lightning	33–28–9	W
71	March 26, 1998	4–5	@ Florida Panthers	33–29–9	L
72	March 28, 1998	8–2	Tampa Bay Lightning	34–29–9	W
73	March 31, 1998	3–3 OT	@ Carolina Hurricanes	34–29–10	T

April: 3–3–3 (home: 0–2–2; road: 3–1–1)

Game	Date	Score	Opponent	Record	Recap
74	April 1, 1998	4–3	@ Florida Panthers	35–29–10	W
75	April 4, 1998	0–1	Carolina Hurricanes	35–30–10	L
76	April 6, 1998	2–2 OT	@ Washington Capitals	35–30–11	T
77	April 7, 1998	3–2	@ New York Rangers	36–30–11	W
78	April 10, 1998	1–2	@ Buffalo Sabres	36–31–11	L
79	April 11, 1998	3–3 OT	New York Islanders	36–31–12	T
80	April 15, 1998	2–6	Boston Bruins	36–32–12	L
81	April 16, 1998	2–0	@ Ottawa Senators	37–32–12	W
82	April 18, 1998	3–3 OT	Buffalo Sabres	37–32–13	T

Legend: W Win (2 points) L Loss (0 points) T Tie (1 point)

=== Playoffs ===
1998 Stanley Cup playoffs
Eastern Conference Quarterfinals vs. (2) Pittsburgh Penguins – Canadiens win 4–2

Game	Date	Score	Opponent	Series	Recap
1	April 23, 1998	2–3	@ Pittsburgh Penguins	Penguins lead 1–0	L
2	April 25, 1998	4–1	@ Pittsburgh Penguins	Series tied 1–1	W
3	April 27, 1998	3–1	Pittsburgh Penguins	Canadiens lead 2–1	W
4	April 29, 1998	3–6	Pittsburgh Penguins	Series tied 2–2	L
5	May 1, 1998	5–2	@ Pittsburgh Penguins	Canadiens lead 3–2	W
6	May 3, 1998	3–0	Pittsburgh Penguins	Canadiens win 4–2	W

Eastern Conference Semifinals vs. (6) Buffalo Sabres – Sabres win 4–0

Game	Date	Score	Opponent	Series	Recap
1	May 8, 1998	2–3 OT	@ Buffalo Sabres	Sabres lead 1–0	L
2	May 10, 1998	3–6	@ Buffalo Sabres	Sabres lead 2–0	L
3	May 12, 1998	4–5 2OT	Buffalo Sabres	Sabres lead 3–0	L
4	May 14, 1998	1–3	Buffalo Sabres	Sabres win 4–0	L

Legend: W Win L Loss

== Player statistics ==
=== Scoring ===
- Position abbreviations: C = Centre; D = Defence; G = Goaltender; LW = Left wing; RW = Right wing
- † = Joined team via a transaction (e.g., trade, waivers, signing) during the season. Stats reflect time with the Canadiens only.
- ‡ = Left team via a transaction (e.g., trade, waivers, release) during the season. Stats reflect time with the Canadiens only.

No.	Player	Pos	Regular season						Playoffs					
No.	Player	Pos	GP	G	A	Pts	+/-	PIM	GP	G	A	Pts	+/-	PIM
8	Mark Recchi	RW	82	32	42	74	11	51	10	4	8	12	2	6
25	Vincent Damphousse	C	76	18	41	59	14	58	10	3	6	9	−4	22
11	Saku Koivu	C	69	14	43	57	8	48	6	2	3	5	4	2
27	Shayne Corson	LW	62	21	34	55	2	108	10	3	6	9	3	26
26	Martin Rucinsky	LW	78	21	32	53	13	84	10	3	0	3	−2	4
38	Vladimir Malakhov	D	74	13	31	44	16	70	9	3	4	7	−3	10
49	Brian Savage	LW	64	26	17	43	11	36	9	0	2	2	−2	6
43	Patrice Brisebois	D	79	10	27	37	16	67	10	1	0	1	−5	0
22	Dave Manson	D	81	4	30	34	22	122	10	0	1	1	0	14
17	Benoit Brunet	LW	68	12	20	32	11	61	8	1	0	1	1	4
20	Valeri Bure‡	RW	50	7	22	29	−5	33	—	—	—	—	—	—
28	Marc Bureau	C	74	13	6	19	0	12	10	1	2	3	−1	6
5	Stephane Quintal	D	71	6	10	16	13	97	9	0	2	2	2	4
24	Scott Thornton	LW	67	6	9	15	0	158	9	0	2	2	0	10
71	Sebastien Bordeleau	C	53	6	8	14	5	36	5	0	0	0	−1	2
44	Jonas Hoglund†	LW	28	6	5	11	2	6	10	2	0	2	−1	0
37	Patrick Poulin†	C	34	4	6	10	−1	8	3	0	0	0	−1	0
23	Turner Stevenson	RW	63	4	6	10	−8	110	10	3	4	7	1	12
44	Stephane Richer‡	RW	14	5	4	9	1	5	—	—	—	—	—	—
34	Peter Popovic	D	69	2	6	8	−6	38	10	1	1	2	2	2
12	Darcy Tucker‡	RW	39	1	5	6	−6	57	—	—	—	—	—	—
3	Zarley Zalapski†	D	28	1	5	6	−1	22	6	0	1	1	−3	4
52	Craig Rivet	D	61	0	2	2	−3	93	5	0	0	0	−2	2
41	Jocelyn Thibault	G	47	0	2	2		0	2	0	1	1		0
29	Brett Clark	D	41	1	0	1	−3	20	—	—	—	—	—	—
15	Eric Houde	C	9	1	0	1	−3	0	—	—	—	—	—	—
3	David Wilkie‡	D	5	1	0	1	−1	4	—	—	—	—	—	—
55	Igor Ulanov†	D	4	0	1	1	−2	12	10	1	4	5	3	12
21	Jassen Cullimore‡	D	3	0	0	0	0	4	—	—	—	—	—	—
48	Francois Groleau	D	1	0	0	0	1	0	—	—	—	—	—	—
46	Matt Higgins	C	1	0	0	0	−1	0	—	—	—	—	—	—
51	David Ling‡	RW	1	0	0	0	−1	0	—	—	—	—	—	—
35	Andy Moog	G	42	0	0	0		4	9	0	0	0		0
14	Terry Ryan	LW	4	0	0	0	0	31	—	—	—	—	—	—
21	Mick Vukota†	RW	22	0	0	0	−4	76	1	0	0	0	0	0
60	Jose Theodore	G	—	—	—	—	—	—	3	0	0	0		0

=== Goaltending ===
No.	Player	Regular season										Playoffs								
No.	Player	GP	W	L	T	SA	GA	GAA	SV%	SO	TOI	GP	W	L	SA	GA	GAA	SV%	SO	TOI
41	Jocelyn Thibault	47	19	15	8	1109	109	2.47	.902	2	2652	2	0	0	16	4	5.53	.750	0	43
35	Andy Moog	42	18	17	5	1024	97	2.49	.905	3	2337	9	4	5	204	24	3.04	.882	1	474
60	Jose Theodore	—	—	—	—	—	—	—	—	—	—	3	0	1	35	1	0.50	.971	0	120

== Awards and records ==
=== Awards ===
Type	Award/honour	Recipient	Ref
League (in-season)	NHL All-Star Game selection	Shayne Corson	
League (in-season)	NHL All-Star Game selection	Saku Koivu	
League (in-season)	NHL All-Star Game selection	Mark Recchi	
Team	Jacques Beauchamp Molson Trophy	Patrice Brisebois	
Team	Jacques Beauchamp Molson Trophy	Marc Bureau	
Team	Molson Cup	Mark Recchi	

=== Milestones ===
Milestone	Player	Date	Ref
First game	Brett Clark	October 4, 1997	
First game	Matt Higgins	November 26, 1997	

== Draft picks ==
Montreal's draft picks at the 1997 NHL entry draft held at the Civic Arena in Pittsburgh, Pennsylvania.

Round	#	Player	Nationality	College/Junior/Club team (League)
1	11	Jason Ward	Canada	Erie Otters (OHL)
2	37	Gregor Baumgartner	Austria	Laval Titan College Francais (QMJHL)
3	65	Ilkka Mikkola	Finland	Karpat (Finland)
4	91	Daniel Tetrault	Canada	Brandon Wheat Kings (WHL)
5	118	Konstantin Sidulov	Russia	Mechel Chelyabinsk (Russia)
5	122	Gennady Razin	Ukraine	Kamloops Blazers (WHL)
6	145	Jonathan Desroches	Canada	Granby Predateurs (QMJHL)
7	172	Ben Guite	Canada	University of Maine (Hockey East)
8	197	Petr Kubos	Czech Republic	Petra Vsetin (Czech Republic)
8	202	Andrei Sidyakin	Russia	Salavat Yulaev Ufa (Russia)
9	228	Jarl-Espen Ygranes	Norway	Furuset (Norway)

== See also ==
- 1997–98 NHL season
