= Sidyakin =

Sidyakin is a surname. Notable people with the surname include:

- Aleksandr Sidyakin (born 1977), Russian politician
- Andrei Sidyakin (born 1979), Russian ice hockey player

== See also ==
- Sidakeni
