= Petré =

Petré may refer to:

- Gio Petré, a Swedish film actress
- Henrik Petré, a Swedish B.Sc. in sports science and former professional ice hockey player
