= Mrázek =

Mrázek (feminine Mrázková) is a Czech surname. Notable people include:

- Daniel Mrázek (born 2003), Czech ice dancer
- František Mrázek (1958–2006), controversial Czech entrepreneur
- František Mrázek (ice hockey) (born 1979), Czech ice hockey player
- Giedrė Lukšaitė-Mrázková (born 1944), Lithuanian harpsichordist
- Ivan Mrázek (1926–2019), Czech basketball player and coach
- Jana Mrázková (born 1940), Czech figure skater
- Jaroslav Mrázek (born 1986), Czech ice hockey player
- Jerome Mrazek (born 1951), Canadian ice hockey goaltender
- Kateřina Mrázková (born 2006), Czech ice dancer
- Ludovic Mrazek (1867–1944), Romanian geologist
- Petr Mrázek (born 1992), Czech ice hockey player
- Robert J. Mrazek (born 1945), politician and author from New York
- Roman Mrázek (born 1962), race walker who represented Czechoslovakia and later Slovakia
- Tomáš Mrázek (born 1982), professional Czech rock climber
- Václav Mrázek (1925–1957), Czech serial killer
- William Mrazek (1911–1992), German-American loads engineer
