= René Stüssi =

Swiss ice hockey player (born 1978)

- Born: December 13, 1978 (age 47) Muri, Switzerland
- Height: 6 ft 0 in (183 cm)
- Weight: 196 lb (89 kg; 14 st 0 lb)
- Position: Right wing
- Shot: Right
- Played for: HC Thurgau; EHC Kloten; ZSC Lions; EV Zug; EHC Chur; EHC Basel; HC Ajoie
- NHL draft: 209th overall, 1997; Mighty Ducks of Anaheim
- Playing career: 1995–2017

René Stüssi (born December 13, 1978) is a former Swiss professional ice hockey player, who played right winger.

Stüssi played a total of 227 regular season games in the Nationalliga A, playing for EHC Kloten, ZSC Lions, EV Zug, EHC Chur and EHC Basel. He finished his career in 2017 with Pikes EHC Oberthurgau in the Regio League.

Stüssi was drafted 209th overall by the Mighty Ducks of Anaheim in the 1997 NHL entry draft but he remained in Switzerland throughout his career.
