= Alexei Komarov =

Russian ice hockey player (born 1978)

- Born: June 11, 1978 (age 47) Moscow, USSR
- Height: 6 ft 8 in (203 cm)
- Weight: 243 lb (110 kg; 17 st 5 lb)
- Position: Defence
- Shot: Left
- Played for: Dynamo Yekaterinburg; HC Spartak Moscow; Utah Grizzlies; HC Dynamo Moscow; HC MVD; Vityaz Chekhov; Krylya Sovetov Moscow
- NHL draft: 216th overall, 1997; Dallas Stars
- Playing career: 1997–2008

Alexei Komarov (born June 11, 1978) is a Russian former professional ice hockey defenceman. He played in the Russian Superleague for Dynamo Yekaterinburg, HC Spartak Moscow, HC Dynamo Moscow, HC MVD, Vityaz Chekhov and Krylya Sovetov Moscow. He also played in the American Hockey League for the Utah Grizzlies. He was drafted 216th overall in the 1997 NHL entry draft by the Dallas Stars.

== Career statistics ==
			Regular season					Playoffs
Season	Team	League	GP	G	A	Pts	PIM	GP	G	A	Pts	PIM
1993–94	HC Dynamo Moscow-2	Russia3	1	0	0	0	0	—	—	—	—	—
1994–95	HC Dynamo Moscow-2	Russia2	5	0	0	0	2	—	—	—	—	—
1995–96	HC Dynamo Moscow-2	Russia2	14	0	0	0	8	—	—	—	—	—
1996–97	HC Dynamo Moscow-2	Russia3	46	3	5	8	38	—	—	—	—	—
1997–98	Dinamo-Energija Yekaterinburg	Russia	21	0	0	0	6	—	—	—	—	—
1997–98	Dinamo-Energija Yekaterinburg-2	Russia3	7	1	5	6	8	—	—	—	—	—
1998–99	HC Dynamo Moscow-2	Russia2	15	5	6	11	14	—	—	—	—	—
1998–99	HC Spartak Moscow	Russia	21	1	0	1	6	—	—	—	—	—
1999–00	HC Spartak Moscow	Russia2	32	0	5	5	22	9	0	1	1	10
1999–00	HC Spartak Moscow-2	Russia3	3	1	1	2	0	—	—	—	—	—
2000–01	HC Spartak Moscow	Russia2	33	2	5	7	69	12	0	3	3	8
2000–01	HC Spartak Moscow-2	Russia3	5	3	2	5	6	—	—	—	—	—
2001–02	HC Spartak Moscow	Russia	37	3	5	8	43	—	—	—	—	—
2001–02	HC Spartak Moscow-2	Russia3	3	1	2	3	0	—	—	—	—	—
2002–03	Utah Grizzlies	AHL	55	5	12	17	44	1	0	0	0	2
2003–04	HC Spartak Moscow	Russia2	51	11	9	20	28	12	2	1	3	24
2004–05	HC Spartak Moscow	Russia	15	1	1	2	12	—	—	—	—	—
2004–05	HC Spartak Moscow-2	Russia3	2	1	1	2	0	—	—	—	—	—
2004–05	HC Dynamo Moscow	Russia	1	0	0	0	2	—	—	—	—	—
2004–05	HK MVD	Russia2	6	0	1	1	4	—	—	—	—	—
2005–06	Vityaz Chekhov	Russia	14	0	2	2	22	—	—	—	—	—
2005–06	Vityaz Chekhov-2	Russia3	7	2	0	2	16	—	—	—	—	—
2006–07	HK Dmitrov-2	Russia4	7	2	2	4	20	—	—	—	—	—
2006–07	Krylia Sovetov Moskva	Russia	12	2	2	4	22	—	—	—	—	—
2006–07	Krylia Sovetov Moskva-2	Russia3	4	3	1	4	6	—	—	—	—	—
2007–08	Krylia Sovetov Moskva	Russia2	28	4	8	12	26	—	—	—	—	—
2007–08	Kapitan Stupino	Russia2	22	2	4	6	26	—	—	—	—	—
2007–08	Kapitan Stupino-2	Russia3	2	0	1	1	0	—	—	—	—	—
Russia totals			121	7	10	17	113	—	—	—	—	—
Russia2 totals			206	24	38	62	199	33	2	5	7	42
Russia3 totals			80	15	18	33	74	—	—	—	—	—
