= Rory Fitzpatrick =

American ice hockey player and politician

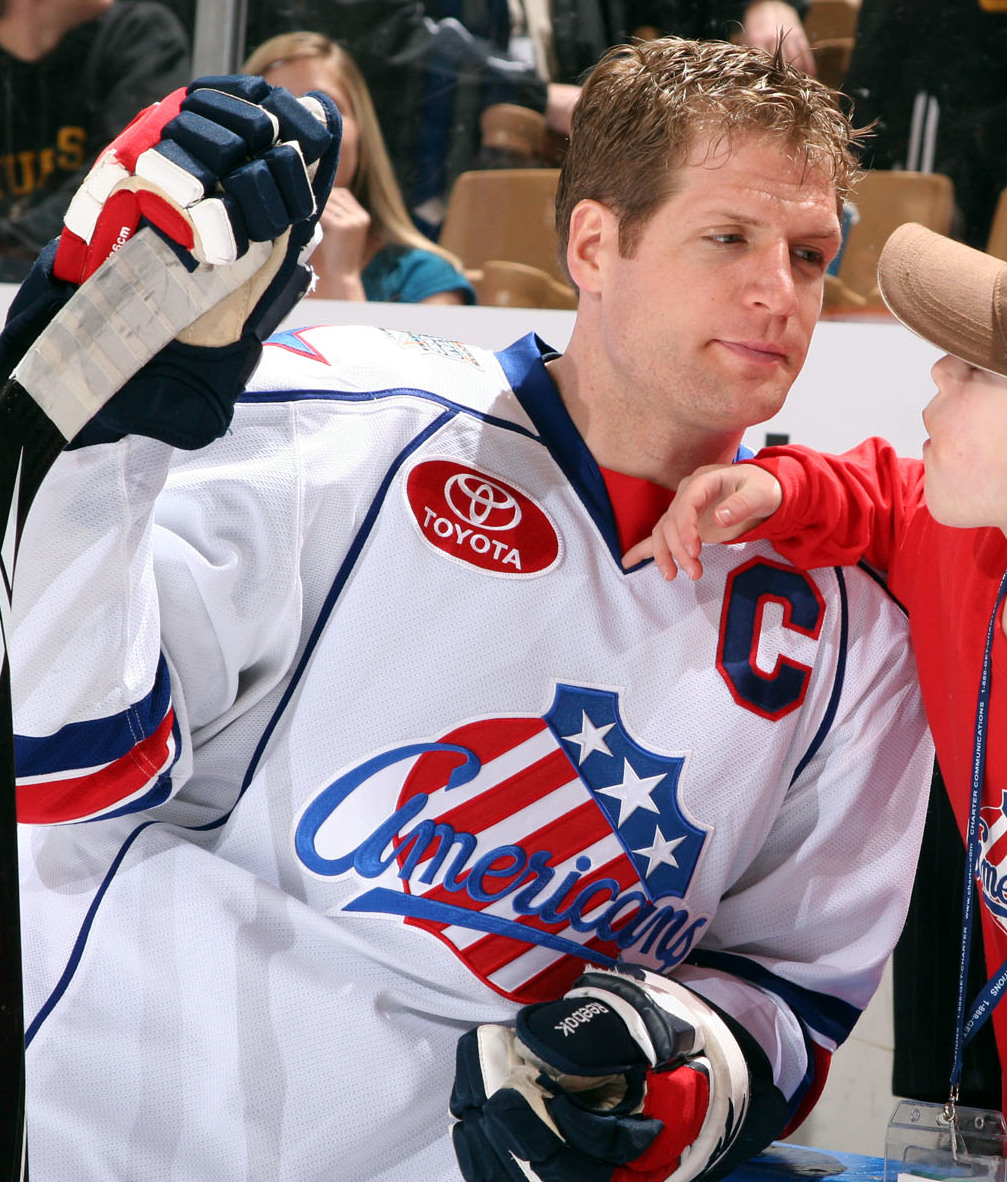
- Fitzpatrick in 2009

Irondequoit Town Supervisor
- In office January 1, 2022 – January 1, 2024
- Preceded by: David Seeley
- Succeeded by: Andrae Evans

Personal details
- Born: January 11, 1975 (age 51) Rochester, New York, U.S.
- Party: Republican
- Children: 4
Ice hockey career
- Height: 6 ft 2 in (188 cm)
- Weight: 210 lb (95 kg; 15 st 0 lb)
- Position: Defense
- Shot: Right
- Played for: Montreal Canadiens; St. Louis Blues; Nashville Predators; Buffalo Sabres; Vancouver Canucks; Philadelphia Flyers
- National team: United States
- NHL draft: 47th overall, 1993; Montreal Canadiens
- Playing career: 1995–2010

Rory Brian Fitzpatrick (born January 11, 1975) is an American politician and former professional ice hockey defenseman who played ten seasons in the National Hockey League (NHL) for the Montreal Canadiens, St. Louis Blues, Nashville Predators, Buffalo Sabres, Vancouver Canucks and Philadelphia Flyers. He was known as a journeyman depth player at the NHL level. A Republican, Fitzpatrick served as Irondequoit town supervisor from 2021 to 2023.

== Playing career ==
As a youth, Fitzpatrick played in the 1989 Quebec International Pee-Wee Hockey Tournament with a minor ice hockey team from Rochester, New York.

Fitzpatrick spent his junior career in the Ontario Hockey League (OHL) with the Sudbury Wolves, and was selected in the second round of the 1993 NHL entry draft, 47th overall, by the Montreal Canadiens.

After completing his junior eligibility, Fitzpatrick made his professional debut in the American Hockey League (AHL), although he eventually joined the Canadiens and played 42 games. However, just six games into the following season, Fitzpatrick was traded to the St. Louis Blues in the blockbuster Pierre Turgeon trade, where he played a pair of games before being sent down to the minors. After that demotion, Fitzpatrick would only play one more game in a Blues uniform, spending the bulk of his time in the minor leagues before being traded to the Nashville Predators.

Fitzpatrick's luck did not improve with the Predators, one of the NHL's newest expansion teams, and he was sent to Edmonton after only two games. In Edmonton, he spent time as a healthy scratch, but never actually saw NHL icetime. However, he was a reliable offensive threat with the Hamilton Bulldogs.

Following the 2000–01 NHL season, Fitzpatrick became an unrestricted free agent. Signing with the Buffalo Sabres as a depth defenseman, Fitzpatrick spent the majority of 2001–02 with his hometown team, the Rochester Americans of the AHL, although he did play five games with the Sabres. This gave him an opportunity to be reunited with former junior teammate Jay McKee.

In 2002–03, Fitzpatrick again started the year in Rochester. However, he was recalled four times by Buffalo, and the last time, on February 12, he stayed with the team, and spent the entire 2003–04 with them. Sabres head coach Lindy Ruff played him in all situations — evenstrength, on the power play and short-handed. A knee injury prematurely ended Fitzpatrick's season.

In July 2004, Fitzpatrick filed for salary arbitration, but was able to reach a deal with the Sabres before the hearing. During the 2004–05 NHL lockout, he spent his time doing odd jobs before signing with Rochester for the final 20 games. He also played with the Original Stars Hockey League before its collapse, and worked at a hockey clinic.

After returning with the Sabres for 2005–06, Fitzpatrick then moved on to the Vancouver Canucks the following season and secured a role as a depth defenseman playing in 58 games and appearing in the playoffs. A free agent, Fitzpatrick then signed a one-year contract with the Philadelphia Flyers on October 9, 2007, and split the 2007–08 season between the Flyers and AHL affiliate, the Philadelphia Phantoms.

In 2008, Fitzpatrick former AHL club, the Rochester Americans (also his hometown) requested that now sole parent club, the Florida Panthers, provide the Amerks with more veteran players to aide prospects, and put together a winning team. The Panthers responded by recruiting fan-favorite Fitzpatrick to a two-year contract to have him lead the way for Rochester's defense.

== 2007 All-Star Game vote ==
During the 2006–07 NHL season, while playing for the Vancouver Canucks, despite having no points in 18 games, Fitzpatrick finished third in All-Star Game voting for defensemen in the Western Conference with 550,177 votes, falling 23,000 votes shy of second place Nicklas Lidström, winner of four Norris Trophies and three Stanley Cups. The idea was to use the new NHL procedure, where people were encouraged to vote as often as they liked, to have an unlikely candidate chosen. Contributors to this goal sent the idea across the Internet in the hopes of having Fitzpatrick voted in as one of the two starting defensemen for the Western Conference. They also created several videos on YouTube as a way to spread news. A website, www.voteforrory.com, was created as well. Fitzpatrick peaked in balloting at the number two position before eventually being bumped from participation in the game to third place.

The plot was originally conceived as a humorous campaign designed to show the flaws in the NHL voting system. The logic was that if enough people voted for an unlikely player to start the game, the NHL would change its system. After some time, the plan metamorphosed for many into a more symbolic gesture.

For his part, Fitzpatrick — who never actively supported the campaign beyond donning a T-shirt at the request of photographers — stated he had gotten a kick out of the movement and acknowledged the hard work that his supporters had put into it. Fitzpatrick's teammates were also supportive, with several voicing their intention to vote, and wearing customized "Vote for Rory" T-shirts at a team practice.

The final voting results on January 13, 2007, saw Fitzpatrick finish in third place behind Scott Niedermayer and Nicklas Lidström, meaning he did not start in the All-Star game. Slate found the final results suspicious due to unlikely numerical coincidences in the final week of voting, and believed the NHL altered the vote counts.

Later, in similar incident, for the 2016 National Hockey League All-Star Game, John Scott of the Arizona Coyotes was chosen by the fans to Captain Team Pacific despite having only recorded 1 point in 11 games played with the Arizona Coyotes. After this the league amended the fan voting rules to prevent players like Scott and Fitzpatrick from being able to participate this way again.

Final Voting Results
Player	Team	Votes
Scott Niedermayer	Anaheim Ducks	591,657
Nicklas Lidström	Detroit Red Wings	573,069
Rory Fitzpatrick	Vancouver Canucks	550,177
Chris Pronger	Anaheim Ducks	433,972
Dion Phaneuf	Calgary Flames	395,168

== Career statistics ==
=== Regular season and playoffs ===
			Regular season					Playoffs
Season	Team	League	GP	G	A	Pts	PIM	GP	G	A	Pts	PIM
1990–91	Rochester Jr. Americans	EmJHL	40	0	5	5		—	—	—	—	—
1991–92	Rochester Jr. Americans	EmJHL	28	8	28	36	141	—	—	—	—	—
1992–93	Sudbury Wolves	OHL	58	4	20	24	68	14	0	0	0	17
1993–94	Sudbury Wolves	OHL	65	12	34	46	112	10	2	5	7	10
1994–95	Sudbury Wolves	OHL	56	12	36	48	72	18	3	5	18	21
1994–95	Fredericton Canadiens	AHL	—	—	—	—	—	10	1	2	3	5
1995–96	Fredericton Canadiens	AHL	18	4	6	10	36	—	—	—	—	—
1995–96	Montreal Canadiens	NHL	42	0	2	2	18	6	1	1	2	0
1996–97	Worcester IceCats	AHL	49	4	13	17	78	5	1	2	3	0
1996–97	Montreal Canadiens	NHL	6	0	1	1	6	—	—	—	—	—
1996–97	St. Louis Blues	NHL	2	0	0	0	2	—	—	—	—	—
1997–98	Worcester IceCats	AHL	62	8	22	30	111	11	0	3	3	26
1998–99	Worcester IceCats	AHL	53	5	16	21	82	4	0	1	1	17
1998–99	St. Louis Blues	NHL	1	0	0	0	2	—	—	—	—	—
1999–2000	Worcester IceCats	AHL	28	0	5	5	48	—	—	—	—	—
1999–2000	Milwaukee Admirals	IHL	27	2	1	3	27	—	—	—	—	—
2000–01	Milwaukee Admirals	IHL	22	0	2	2	32	—	—	—	—	—
2000–01	Hamilton Bulldogs	AHL	34	3	17	20	29	—	—	—	—	—
2000–01	Nashville Predators	NHL	2	0	0	0	2	—	—	—	—	—
2001–02	Rochester Americans	AHL	60	4	8	12	83	2	0	1	1	0
2001–02	Buffalo Sabres	NHL	5	0	0	0	4	—	—	—	—	—
2002–03	Rochester Americans	AHL	41	5	11	16	65	—	—	—	—	—
2002–03	Buffalo Sabres	NHL	36	1	3	4	16	—	—	—	—	—
2003–04	Buffalo Sabres	NHL	60	4	7	11	44	—	—	—	—	—
2004–05	Rochester Americans	AHL	20	1	1	2	18	9	0	1	1	12
2005–06	Buffalo Sabres	NHL	56	4	5	9	50	11	0	4	4	16
2006–07	Vancouver Canucks	NHL	58	1	6	7	46	3	0	0	0	6
2007–08	Philadelphia Flyers	NHL	19	0	1	1	11	—	—	—	—	—
2007–08	Philadelphia Phantoms	AHL	19	1	4	5	24	12	0	2	2	11
2008–09	Rochester Americans	AHL	46	4	10	14	37	—	—	—	—	—
2009–10	Rochester Americans	AHL	44	0	6	6	37	2	0	0	0	0
AHL totals			474	39	119	158	648	55	2	12	14	71
NHL totals			287	10	25	35	201	20	1	5	6	22

=== International ===
Year	Team	Event	Result	GP	G	A	Pts	PIM
1995	United States	WJC	5th	7	0	2	2	8
Junior totals				7	0	2	2	8

== Transactions ==
- June 26, 1993 – Fitzpatrick drafted by Montreal
- October 29, 1996 – Montreal trades Fitzpatrick, Pierre Turgeon and Craig Conroy to St. Louis for Shayne Corson, Murray Baron and a 5th round draft pick (Gennady Razin)
- October 5, 1998 – Boston claims Fitzpatrick in the 1998 NHL Waiver Draft from St. Louis
- October 7, 1998 – St. Louis claims Fitzpatrick off waivers from Boston
- February 9, 2000 – St. Louis trades Fitzpatrick to Nashville for Dan Keczmer
- January 12, 2001 – Nashville trades Fitzpatrick to Edmonton for future considerations
- August 14, 2001 – Buffalo signs Fitzpatrick
- August 17, 2006 – Vancouver signs Fitzpatrick
- September 14, 2007 – Philadelphia invites Fitzpatrick to training camp
- January 3, 2008 – Philadelphia places Fitzpatrick on waivers

== Post-playing career ==
Following Fitzpatrick's retirement, he took ownership of a restaurant called Cooper Deli in the Rochester suburb of Irondequoit. In 2021, he entered politics as the Republican candidate for Irondequoit Town Supervisor against Democratic nominee Joe Morelle Jr., the son of Congressman Joe Morelle. He defeated Morelle Jr. by 76 votes to win the office. He ran for re-election in 2023 but lost to Andrae Evens.
