= Tomi Källarsson =

Finnish ice hockey player

- Born: March 15, 1979 (age 47) Lempäälä, Finland
- Height: 6 ft 3 in (191 cm)
- Weight: 205 lb (93 kg; 14 st 9 lb)
- Position: Defence
- Shot: Left
- Played for: HPK; Timrå IK; Ilves; Blues; JYP
- NHL draft: 93rd overall, 1997; New York Rangers
- Playing career: 1998–2007

Tomi Källarsson (born March 15, 1979) is a Finnish former professional ice hockey defenceman. He played in the SM-liiga for HPK, Ilves, Blues and JYP and also played in the Swedish Elitserien for Timrå IK. He was drafted 93rd overall by the New York Rangers in the 1997 NHL entry draft.

== Career statistics ==
			Regular season					Playoffs
Season	Team	League	GP	G	A	Pts	PIM	GP	G	A	Pts	PIM
1994–95	Tappara U16	Jr. C SM-sarja	22	9	4	13	26	—	—	—	—	—
1995–96	Tappara U18	Jr. B SM-sarja	31	3	5	8	24	—	—	—	—	—
1996–97	HPK U18	Jr. B SM-sarja	14	7	8	15	10	—	—	—	—	—
1996–97	HPK U20	Jr. A SM-liiga	31	1	3	4	26	6	0	0	0	2
1997–98	HPK U20	Jr. A SM-liiga	32	5	9	14	71	—	—	—	—	—
1997–98	HPK	Liiga	12	0	0	0	2	—	—	—	—	—
1997–98	Lahti Pelicans	I-Divisioona	3	0	0	0	0	—	—	—	—	—
1998–99	HPK U20	Jr. A SM-liiga	2	0	1	1	6	—	—	—	—	—
1998–99	HPK	Liiga	25	0	0	0	22	8	0	0	0	8
1998–99	Ahmat Hyvinkää	I-Divisioona	21	2	7	9	52	—	—	—	—	—
1999–00	HPK U20	Jr. A SM-liiga	3	2	2	4	4	—	—	—	—	—
1999–00	HPK	Liiga	50	0	5	5	58	8	0	0	0	4
2000–01	KOOVEE U20	Jr. A I-Divisioona	2	0	1	1	2	—	—	—	—	—
2000–01	Timrå IK	SHL	37	0	0	0	54	—	—	—	—	—
2001–02	Timrå IK	SHL	43	4	4	8	76	—	—	—	—	—
2001–02	Ilves	Liiga	13	1	1	2	35	3	0	0	0	4
2002–03	Ilves	Liiga	12	0	0	0	2	—	—	—	—	—
2003–04	Ilves	Liiga	21	0	2	2	29	7	1	0	1	2
2003–04	FPS	Mestis	2	0	0	0	4	—	—	—	—	—
2004–05	Milano Vipers	Italy	35	6	8	14	20	15	2	6	8	8
2005–06	Herning Blue Fox	Denmark	32	2	6	8	59	15	1	1	2	14
2006–07	Espoo Blues	Liiga	8	1	1	2	14	—	—	—	—	—
2006–07	HC Salamat	Mestis	1	0	0	0	0	—	—	—	—	—
2006–07	JYP Jyväskylä	Liiga	35	1	5	6	44	—	—	—	—	—
Liiga totals			176	3	14	17	206	26	1	0	1	18
