= Róbert Döme =

Slovak ice hockey player (born 1979)

- Born: January 29, 1979 (age 47) Senica, Czechoslovakia
- Height: 6 ft 1 in (185 cm)
- Weight: 205 lb (93 kg; 14 st 9 lb)
- Position: Right wing
- Shot: Left
- Played for: Pittsburgh Penguins; HC Trinec; HC Kladno; Calgary Flames; Södertälje SK; Nürnberg Ice Tigers; Modo Hockey; HC Slovan Bratislava
- NHL draft: 17th overall, 1997; Pittsburgh Penguins
- Playing career: 1995–2010

Róbert Döme (born January 29, 1979) is a Slovak former professional ice hockey right winger who played in the National Hockey League (NHL) with the Pittsburgh Penguins and the Calgary Flames.

== Playing career ==
Döme played in the 1992 and 1993 Quebec International Pee-Wee Hockey Tournaments with a youth ice hockey team from Bratislava.

After playing three seasons in the International Hockey League, Döme was drafted 17th overall in the 1997 NHL entry draft by the Pittsburgh Penguins. He appeared in 30 games with the Penguins in the 1997–98 season, and 22 more in the 1999–2000 season. He made his most recent NHL appearance in the 2002–03 season, playing in one game with the Calgary Flames.

Döme has played in Europe since 2003, playing two seasons with Södertälje SK of the Swedish Elite League and the 2005–06 season with the Nürnberg Ice Tigers of Germany's DEL. In July 2006 he signed a two-year contract with Modo Hockey of the Swedish Elite League where he became a Swedish champion in the season of 2006/2007. Received an award as the “Modo player with the largest heart for the spectators” during the celebrations at the town square the day after he brought the gold to Modo and Örnsköldsvik.

Döme played as a captain for HC Slovan Bratislava in the Slovnaft Extraliga from the season 2007–08. Slovan Bratislava went on to win Slovnaft Extraliga that year.

Döme played six games with HC Dukla Senica of Slovak 1.Liga, a second-tier league below Slovnaft Extraliga, during the 2009–10 season. He scored one goal and five points in six games played.

Döme retired in 2010 and as now works as a scout.

== Career statistics ==
=== Regular season and playoffs ===
| | | | Regular season | | | | | Playoffs |
| Season | Team | League | GP | G | A | Pts | PIM | GP | G | A | Pts | PIM |
|---|---|---|---|---|---|---|---|---|---|---|---|---|
| 1994–95 | Dukla Trenčín | SVK U20 | 36 | 36 | 43 | 79 | 39 | — | — | — | — | — |
| 1995–96 | Utah Grizzlies | IHL | 56 | 10 | 9 | 19 | 28 | — | — | — | — | — |
| 1996–97 | Long Beach Ice Dogs | IHL | 13 | 4 | 6 | 10 | 14 | — | — | — | — | — |
| 1996–97 | Las Vegas Thunder | IHL | 43 | 10 | 7 | 17 | 22 | — | — | — | — | — |
| 1997–98 | Pittsburgh Penguins | NHL | 30 | 5 | 2 | 7 | 12 | — | — | — | — | — |
| 1997–98 | Syracuse Crunch | AHL | 36 | 21 | 25 | 46 | 77 | — | — | — | — | — |
| 1998–99 | Houston Aeros | IHL | 20 | 2 | 4 | 6 | 24 | — | — | — | — | — |
| 1998–99 | Syracuse Crunch | AHL | 48 | 18 | 17 | 35 | 70 | — | — | — | — | — |
| 1999–2000 | Pittsburgh Penguins | NHL | 22 | 2 | 5 | 7 | 0 | — | — | — | — | — |
| 1999–2000 | Wilkes–Barre/Scranton Penguins | AHL | 51 | 12 | 26 | 38 | 83 | — | — | — | — | — |
| 2000–01 | HC Oceláři Třinec | ELH | 5 | 0 | 3 | 3 | 4 | — | — | — | — | — |
| 2000–01 | HC Vagnerplast Kladno | ELH | 29 | 9 | 12 | 21 | 57 | — | — | — | — | — |
| 2001–02 | Wilkes–Barre/Scranton Penguins | AHL | 39 | 9 | 8 | 17 | 53 | — | — | — | — | — |
| 2002–03 | Calgary Flames | NHL | 1 | 0 | 0 | 0 | 0 | — | — | — | — | — |
| 2002–03 | Saint John Flames | AHL | 56 | 27 | 29 | 56 | 41 | — | — | — | — | — |
| 2003–04 | Lowell Lock Monsters | AHL | 13 | 5 | 7 | 12 | 19 | — | — | — | — | — |
| 2003–04 | Södertälje SK | SEL | 28 | 10 | 19 | 29 | 8 | — | — | — | — | — |
| 2004–05 | Södertälje SK | SEL | 50 | 12 | 10 | 22 | 92 | 10 | 0 | 1 | 1 | 8 |
| 2005–06 | Thomas Sabo Ice Tigers | DEL | 48 | 12 | 23 | 35 | 80 | 4 | 2 | 2 | 4 | 8 |
| 2006–07 | Modo Hockey | SEL | 50 | 13 | 10 | 23 | 66 | 20 | 6 | 8 | 14 | 55 |
| 2007–08 | HC Slovan Bratislava | SVK | 37 | 14 | 21 | 35 | 28 | 17 | 5 | 8 | 13 | 33 |
| 2008–09 | HC Slovan Bratislava | SVK | 45 | 24 | 24 | 48 | 75 | 12 | 2 | 6 | 8 | 6 |
| 2009–10 | HC Dukla Senica | SVK.2 | 6 | 1 | 4 | 5 | 4 | — | — | — | — | — |
| IHL totals | | | 132 | 26 | 26 | 52 | 88 | — | — | — | — | — |
| NHL totals | | | 53 | 7 | 7 | 14 | 12 | — | — | — | — | — |
| AHL totals | | | 243 | 92 | 112 | 204 | 343 | — | — | — | — | — |

=== International ===
| Year | Team | Event | GP | G | A | Pts | PIM |
|---|---|---|---|---|---|---|---|
| 1995 | Slovakia | EJC B | 5 | 7 | 10 | 17 | 2 |
| Junior totals | | | 5 | 7 | 10 | 17 | 2 |

== Awards and accomplishments ==
- 1995–96: Turner Cup Champion (as a member of the Utah Grizzlies)
- 2006–07: Elitserien Champion (as a member of Modo Hockey)
- 2007–08: Slovnaft Extraliga Champion (as a member of HC Slovan Bratislava)

| Preceded by Craig Hillier | Pittsburgh Penguins first-round draft pick 1997 | Succeeded by Milan Kraft |
