= František Mrázek (ice hockey) =

Czech ice hockey player

- Born: May 16, 1979 (age 46) České Budějovice, Czechoslovakia
- Height: 6 ft 3 in (191 cm)
- Weight: 209 lb (95 kg; 14 st 13 lb)
- Position: Left wing
- Shoots: Left
- 2nd Bundesliga team Former teams: Landshut Cannibals; St. John's Maple Leafs; HC České Budějovice; HIFK; HC Pardubice; HC Plzeň; HC Kladno; HC Slovan Ústečtí Lvi
- NHL draft: 111th overall, 1997; Toronto Maple Leafs
- Playing career: 2000–present

František Mrázek (born May 16, 1979) is a Czech professional ice hockey left winger playing for the Landshut Cannibals in the German 2nd Bundesliga.

== Career ==
Mrázek was drafted 111th overall in the 1997 NHL entry draft by the Toronto Maple Leafs. He played in the Czech Extraliga for HC České Budějovice, HC Lipetsk, HC Pardubice, HC Plzeň, HC Kladno and HC Slovan Ústečtí Lvi. He has also played in the Finnish SM-liiga for HIFK and the American Hockey League for the St. John's Maple Leafs.
