= Henrik Petré =

Swedish ice hockey player

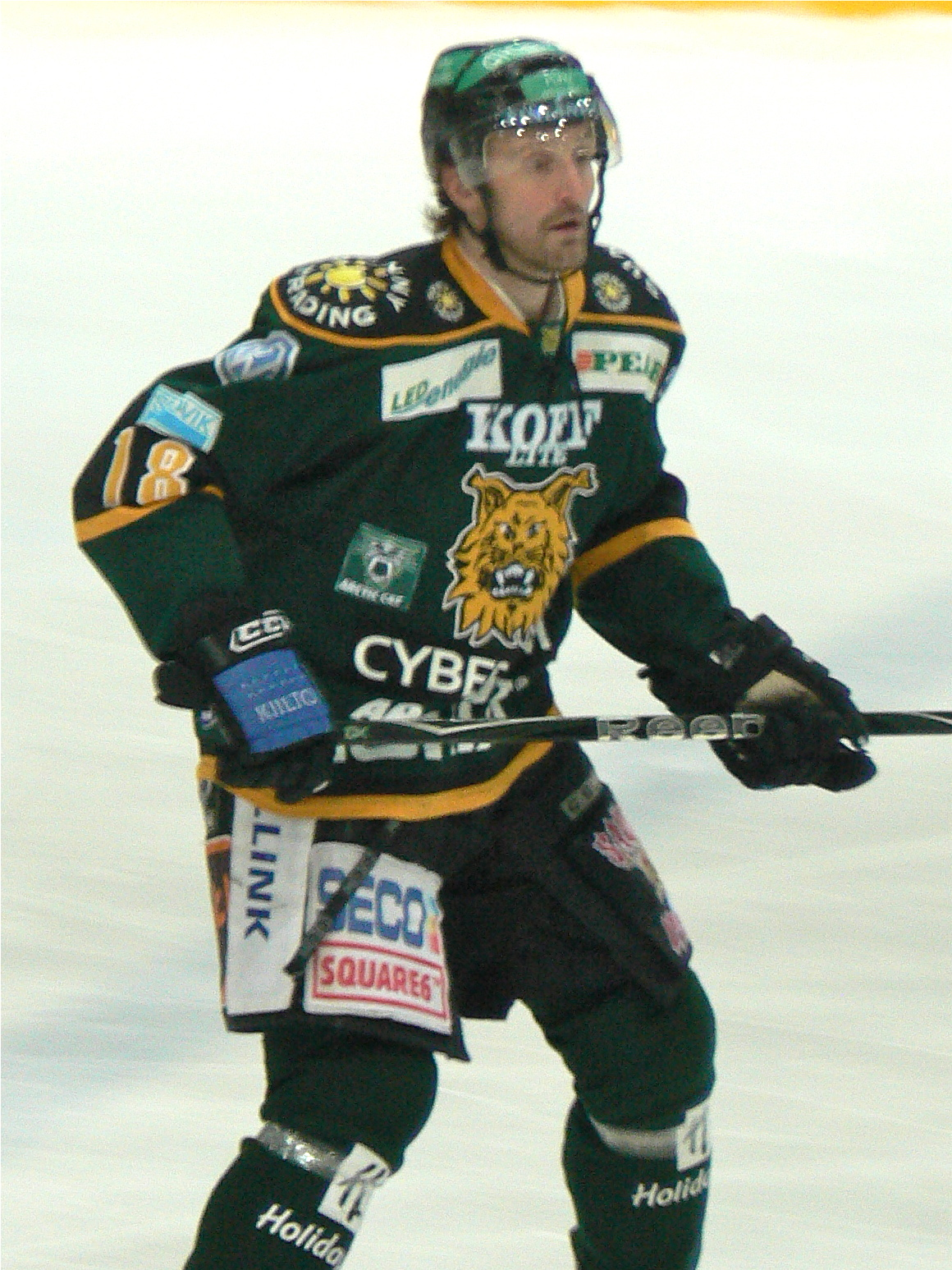
- Born: April 9, 1979 (age 47) Kista, Sweden
- Height: 6 ft 2 in (188 cm)
- Weight: 209 lb (95 kg; 14 st 13 lb)
- Position: Defence
- Shot: Left
- Played for: Huddinge IK; Djurgårdens IF; Brynäs IF; Mora IK; Södertälje SK; SaiPa; HC Ässät Pori; HC Slovan Bratislava; Tappara; Timrå IK; Ilves; Almtuna IS; HK Jesenice; Saryarka Karagandy
- NHL draft: 143rd overall, 1997; Washington Capitals
- Playing career: 1997–2012

Henrik Petré (born April 9, 1979) is a Swedish former professional ice hockey player who played with HC Slovan Bratislava in the Slovak Extraliga. He was selected by the Washington Capitals in the 6th round (143 overall) of the 1997 NHL entry draft.

After his player career, Petré has been active as a strength and conditioning coach for Swedish players of several NHL teams. He has thereafter been engaged as a researcher at the Swedish School of Sport and Health Sciences.

== Career statistics ==
			Regular season					Playoffs
Season	Team	League	GP	G	A	Pts	PIM	GP	G	A	Pts	PIM
1994–95	Djurgårdens IF U16	U16 SM	—	—	—	—	—	—	—	—	—	—
1994–95	Djurgårdens IF J18	J18 Elit	—	—	—	—	—	—	—	—	—	—
1995–96	Djurgårdens IF J18	J18 Elit	—	—	—	—	—	—	—	—	—	—
1995–96	Djurgårdens IF J20	J20 SuperElit	21	6	4	10	8	—	—	—	—	—
1996–97	Djurgårdens IF J20	J20 SuperElit	20	7	6	13	—	—	—	—	—	—
1997–98	Huddinge IK	Division 1	30	4	4	8	30	—	—	—	—	—
1998–99	Djurgårdens IF	Elitserien	9	0	0	0	10	—	—	—	—	—
1998–99	Huddinge IK	Division 1	14	0	1	1	20	—	—	—	—	—
1999–00	Brynäs IF	Elitserien	47	3	3	6	73	11	1	0	1	12
2000–01	Brynäs IF	Elitserien	27	2	3	5	20	4	0	1	1	27
2001–02	Brynäs IF	Elitserien	24	2	1	3	49	4	0	0	0	4
2002–03	Brynäs IF	Elitserien	47	1	5	6	32	—	—	—	—	—
2003–04	Brynäs IF	Elitserien	10	0	1	1	6	—	—	—	—	—
2003–04	Mora IK	Allsvenskan	2	1	0	1	4	—	—	—	—	—
2004–05	Mora IK	Elitserien	50	1	5	6	32	—	—	—	—	—
2005–06	Södertälje SK	Elitserien	49	2	3	5	30	—	—	—	—	—
2006–07	SaiPa	SM-liiga	35	3	13	16	71	—	—	—	—	—
2007–08	HC Ässät Pori	SM-liiga	50	6	11	17	26	—	—	—	—	—
2008–09	HC Slovan Bratislava	Slovak	18	0	0	0	10	—	—	—	—	—
2008–09	Tappara	SM-liiga	25	3	6	9	26	—	—	—	—	—
2009–10	Timrå IK	Elitserien	1	0	0	0	0	—	—	—	—	—
2009–10	Ilves	SM-liiga	16	2	4	6	20	—	—	—	—	—
2010–11	Almtuna IS	HockeyAllsvenskan	27	0	5	5	38	5	0	0	0	0
2011–12	HK Jesenice	EBEL	3	1	0	1	18	—	—	—	—	—
2011–12	Saryarka Karagandy	Kazakhstan	4	1	3	4	14	12	0	4	4	10
Elitserien totals			264	11	21	32	252	19	1	1	2	43
SM-liiga totals			126	14	34	48	143	—	—	—	—	—
