= Mark Moore (ice hockey) =

Canadian ice hockey player

- Born: February 13, 1977 (age 49) Windsor, Ontario, Canada
- Height: 6 ft 3 in (191 cm)
- Weight: 185 lb (84 kg; 13 st 3 lb)
- Position: Defence
- Shot: Right
- Played for: Augusta Lynx; Charlotte Checkers; Wheeling Nailers; Wilkes-Barre/Scranton Penguins
- NHL draft: 179th overall, 1997; Pittsburgh Penguins
- Playing career: 2000–2003

Mark Moore (born February 13, 1977) is a Canadian former professional ice hockey defenseman. He was drafted and signed by the Pittsburgh Penguins of the NHL, and played 115 games in the ECHL and an additional 15 games in the American Hockey League.

== Career ==
Moore was drafted by the Pittsburgh Penguins in the seventh round of the 1997 NHL entry draft, selected 179th overall. At the time, Moore was a member of the Harvard Crimson men's ice hockey team. During his senior year, Moore and his two younger brothers Steve and Dominic were all members of the Harvard hockey team, with both younger brothers finishing the season as the top two scorers on the team. The three brothers were the first fraternal trio to skate for the Harvard Crimson and only the sixth fraternal trio in NCAA history to skate on the same team.

Upon graduating from Harvard, Moore signed an NHL player contract with the Pittsburgh Penguins. He attended the Penguins' training camp and was eventually assigned to their ECHL affiliate in Wheeling. Although Moore was not known for his scoring (he averaged 5 points per season while at Harvard), he scored 22 points in 66 games during the 2001-02 ECHL season. Moore split his time between the Nailers and the Augusta Lynx in his final season, during which he was injured.

After missing almost a year, Moore turned down a tryout with the NHL's Montreal Canadiens in September 2003 due to not receiving clearance to play from his doctors. Several months later, Moore's brother Steve would be forced into retirement due to a vicious hit from then-Vancouver Canucks forward Todd Bertuzzi.

== Personal ==
Mark is the older brother of Dominic Moore and Steve Moore. Dominic has played over 800 NHL games with ten different NHL teams, and Steve is a former Colorado Avalanche prospect who played 69 NHL games from 2001 until 2004. Dominic was later traded to the Penguins (the same team that drafted Mark) with Libor Pivko for a 2007 NHL Entry Draft third round pick. While Mark and Dominic played against each other, Mark and Steve once played against each other during a preseason game at the First Union Arena, home of the AHL's Wilkes-Barre/Scranton Penguins.

After his retirement from hockey, Moore authored a book titled Saving the Game in 2006 and briefly wrote for The Hockey News.

Moore was once nicknamed "The Smartest Man in Hockey" due to scoring a 1590 out of a possible 1600 points on his SAT.

Since his retirement, Moore has committed his life to academia, earning several degrees including a BCL/LLB from McGill University and a Doctor of Philosophy from Oxford University. After earning his law degree, Moore also clerked for Chief Justice Beverley McLachlin at the Supreme Court of Canada. Dr. Marcus Moore currently teaches courses on Sports Law, Contracts, and Jurisprudence at UBC's Peter A. Allard School.

Moore runs the Ivy Hockey Academy school in Toronto.

== Career statistics ==
			Regular Season					Playoffs
Season	Team	League	GP	G	A	Pts	PIM	GP	G	A	Pts	PIM
