= Petr Havelka =

Czech ice hockey player

- Born: March 4, 1979 (age 47) Most, Czechoslovakia
- Height: 6 ft 2 in (188 cm)
- Weight: 198 lb (90 kg; 14 st 2 lb)
- Position: Left wing
- Shot: Left
- Played for: HC Sparta Prague; HC Kladno; HC Plzeň
- NHL draft: 152nd overall, 1997; Pittsburgh Penguins
- Playing career: 1999–2006

Petr Havelka (born March 3, 1979) is a Czech former professional ice hockey left winger. He played in the Czech Extraliga for HC Sparta Prague, HC Kladno and HC Plzeň. He was drafted 152nd overall by the Pittsburgh Penguins in the 1997 NHL entry draft.

== Career statistics ==
			Regular season					Playoffs
Season	Team	League	GP	G	A	Pts	PIM	GP	G	A	Pts	PIM
1998–99	HC Sparta Praha	Czech	—	—	—	—	—	4	1	1	2	2
1998–99	HC Kladno	Czech	5	0	0	0	0	—	—	—	—	—
1999–00	HC Sparta Praha U20	Czech U20	2	1	0	1	0	—	—	—	—	—
1999–00	HC Kladno	Czech	6	1	2	3	2	—	—	—	—	—
1999–00	HC Sparta Praha	Czech	20	0	1	1	6	3	0	0	0	0
1999–00	HC Berounští Medvědi	Czech2	5	2	4	6	29	—	—	—	—	—
2000–01	HC Sparta Praha	Czech	—	—	—	—	—	7	1	0	1	2
2000–01	HC Berounští Medvědi	Czech2	3	0	0	0	0	—	—	—	—	—
2001–02	HC Sparta Praha	Czech	35	3	4	7	12	6	0	0	0	2
2001–02	HC Slovan Ústí nad Labem	Czech2	2	0	0	0	2	—	—	—	—	—
2002–03	HC Sparta Praha	Czech	47	10	6	16	38	8	1	3	4	0
2003–04	HC Sparta Praha	Czech	6	1	1	2	2	—	—	—	—	—
2003–04	HC Mladá Boleslav	Czech2	3	1	2	3	2	—	—	—	—	—
2004–05	HC Plzen	Czech	8	1	1	2	10	—	—	—	—	—
2004–05	HC České Budějovice	Czech2	33	3	4	7	18	11	1	0	1	2
2005–06	HC Plzen	Czech	8	0	0	0	4	—	—	—	—	—
2005–06	HC Sparta Praha	Czech	17	0	0	0	4	—	—	—	—	—
2005–06	BK Mladá Boleslav	Czech2	18	5	3	8	20	4	0	1	1	6
Czech totals			152	16	15	31	78	28	3	4	7	6
