= Konstantin Sidulov =

Russian ice hockey player

- Born: January 1, 1977 (age 49) Chelyabinsk, USSR
- Height: 6 ft 1 in (185 cm)
- Weight: 176 lb (80 kg; 12 st 8 lb)
- Position: Defence
- Shot: Left
- Played for: Traktor Chelyabinsk; Fredericton Canadiens; Miami Matadors; Quebec Citadelles; Tallahassee Tiger Sharks; HC Mechel
- NHL draft: 118th overall, 1997; Montreal Canadiens
- Playing career: 1995–2008

Konstantin Sidulov (born January 1, 1977) is a Russian former professional ice hockey defenceman. He played in the Russian Superleague for Traktor Chelyabinsk and HC Mechel. He was drafted 118th overall in the 1997 NHL entry draft by the Montreal Canadiens.

== Career statistics ==
			Regular season					Playoffs
Season	Team	League	GP	G	A	Pts	PIM	GP	G	A	Pts	PIM
1993–94	Taganay Zlatoust	Russia3	2	0	0	0	2	—	—	—	—	—
1994–95	Traktor Chelyabinsk	Russia	2	0	0	0	0	—	—	—	—	—
1994–95	UralAZ Miass	Russia2	15	0	1	1	14	—	—	—	—	—
1994–95	Zvezda Chebarkul	Russia4	6	1	2	3	16	4	1	0	1	10
1995–96	Traktor Chelyabinsk	Russia	52	1	0	1	58	—	—	—	—	—
1995–96	Nadezhda Chelyabinsk	Russia2	4	0	0	0	0	—	—	—	—	—
1996–97	Traktor Chelyabinsk	Russia	42	0	0	0	28	2	0	0	0	0
1997–98	Traktor Chelyabinsk	Russia	42	1	3	4	38	2	0	0	0	0
1997–98	Traktor Chelyabinsk	WPHL	8	0	4	4	8	—	—	—	—	—
1998–99	Fredericton Canadiens	AHL	5	0	0	0	6	—	—	—	—	—
1998–99	Miami Matadors	ECHL	45	1	4	5	60	—	—	—	—	—
1998–99	Traktor Chelyabinsk	Russia	—	—	—	—	—	—	—	—	—	—
1999–00	Quebec Citadelles	AHL	5	0	0	0	2	—	—	—	—	—
1999–00	Tallahassee Tiger Sharks	ECHL	1	0	0	0	0	—	—	—	—	—
1999–00	Mechel Chelyabinsk	Russia	14	1	2	3	10	2	1	0	1	0
2000–01	Mechel Chelyabinsk	Russia	23	1	1	2	22	2	0	0	0	2
2000–01	Mechel Chelyabinsk-2	Russia3	11	0	2	2	42	—	—	—	—	—
2001–02	Mechel Chelyabinsk	Russia	27	2	2	4	18	—	—	—	—	—
2001–02	Mechel Chelyabinsk-2	Russia3	7	0	1	1	8	—	—	—	—	—
2002–03	Traktor Chelyabinsk	Russia2	13	0	1	1	8	—	—	—	—	—
2002–03	Traktor Chelyabinsk-2	Russia3	2	0	4	4	4	—	—	—	—	—
2002–03	Kedr Novouralsk	Russia2	3	0	0	0	4	—	—	—	—	—
2002–03	Kedr Novouralsk-2	Russia4	3	0	2	2	2	—	—	—	—	—
2002–03	Gazovik Tyumen	Russia2	9	0	0	0	10	12	1	1	2	12
2002–03	Gazovik Univer	Russia3	4	0	3	3	4	—	—	—	—	—
2003–04	Gazovik Tyumen	Russia2	47	0	3	3	48	4	0	1	1	10
2003–04	Gazovik Univer	Russia3	2	0	0	0	2	—	—	—	—	—
2004–05	HK Liepājas Metalurgs	Belarus	41	2	6	8	69	3	0	0	0	6
2004–05	HK Liepājas Metalurgs	Latvia	12	0	4	4	18	5	2	3	5	31
2005–06	HK Liepājas Metalurgs	Belarus	41	0	5	5	62	—	—	—	—	—
2005–06	HK Liepājas Metalurgs	Latvia	—	1	6	7	26	—	—	—	—	—
2006–07	Zauralie Kurgan	Russia2	47	0	7	7	52	3	0	0	0	6
2007–08	Kazakhmys Satpaev	Russia2	8	0	0	0	2	—	—	—	—	—
2007–08	Kazakhmys Satpaev-2	Kazakhstan	2	1	0	1	8	—	—	—	—	—
AHL totals			10	0	0	0	8	—	—	—	—	—
ECHL totals			46	1	4	5	60	—	—	—	—	—
Russia totals			202	6	8	14	174	8	1	0	1	2
Belarus totals			82	2	11	13	131	3	0	0	0	6
Russia2 totals			146	0	12	12	138	19	1	2	3	28
