= 1997 NHL entry draft =

1997 North American ice hockey draft

General information
- Date: June 21, 1997
- Location: Civic Arena; Pittsburgh, Pennsylvania, U.S.

Overview
- 246 total selections in 9 rounds
- First selection: (Canada) Joe Thornton (Boston Bruins)
- Hall of Famers: 3: C Joe Thornton; G Roberto Luongo; RW Marian Hossa

The 1997 NHL entry draft was the 35th draft for the National Hockey League. It was held at the Civic Arena in Pittsburgh on June 21, 1997.

The last active player from the 1997 draft class was Joe Thornton, who played his last NHL game in the 2021–22 season.

== Selections by round ==
Club teams are located in North America unless otherwise noted.

=== Round one ===
| = NHL All-Star team · | = NHL All-Star (Note: Players are identified as an All-Star if they were selected for the All-Star game at any time in their career.) · | = NHL All-Star and NHL All-Star team · | = Hall of Famers |

| # | Player | Nationality | NHL team | College/junior/club team |
|---|---|---|---|---|
| 1 | Joe Thornton (C) | Canada | Boston Bruins | Sault Ste. Marie Greyhounds (OHL) |
| 2 | Patrick Marleau (C) | Canada | San Jose Sharks | Seattle Thunderbirds (WHL) |
| 3 | Olli Jokinen (C) | Finland | Los Angeles Kings | HIFK (Finland) |
| 4 | Roberto Luongo (G) | Canada | New York Islanders (from Toronto)^{1} | Val-d'Or Foreurs (QMJHL) |
| 5 | Eric Brewer (D) | Canada | New York Islanders | Prince George Cougars (WHL) |
| 6 | Daniel Tkaczuk (C) | Canada | Calgary Flames | Barrie Colts (OHL) |
| 7 | Paul Mara (D) | United States | Tampa Bay Lightning | Sudbury Wolves (OHL) |
| 8 | Sergei Samsonov (LW) | Russia | Boston Bruins (from Carolina)^{2} | Detroit Vipers (IHL) |
| 9 | Nick Boynton (D) | Canada | Washington Capitals | Ottawa 67's (OHL) |
| 10 | Brad Ference (D) | Canada | Vancouver Canucks | Spokane Chiefs (WHL) |
| 11 | Jason Ward (RW) | Canada | Montreal Canadiens | Erie Otters (OHL) |
| 12 | Marian Hossa (RW) | Slovakia | Ottawa Senators | Dukla Trencin (Slovakia) |
| 13 | Daniel Cleary (LW) | Canada | Chicago Blackhawks | Belleville Bulls (OHL) |
| 14 | Michel Riesen (RW) | Switzerland | Edmonton Oilers | EHC Biel (Switzerland) |
| 15 | Matt Zultek (LW) | Canada | Los Angeles Kings (from St. Louis via Edmonton and St. Louis)^{3} | Ottawa 67's (OHL) |
| 16 | Ty Jones (LW) | United States | Chicago Blackhawks (from Phoenix)^{4} | Spokane Chiefs (WHL) |
| 17 | Robert Dome (RW) | Slovakia | Pittsburgh Penguins | Las Vegas Thunder (IHL) |
| 18 | Michael Holmqvist (C) | Sweden | Mighty Ducks of Anaheim | Djurgardens IF (Sweden) |
| 19 | Stefan Cherneski (RW) | Canada | New York Rangers | Brandon Wheat Kings (WHL) |
| 20 | Mike Brown (LW) | Canada | Florida Panthers | Red Deer Rebels (WHL) |
| 21 | Mika Noronen (G) | Finland | Buffalo Sabres | Tappara (Finland) |
| 22 | Nikos Tselios (D) | United States | Carolina Hurricanes (from Detroit)^{5} | Belleville Bulls (OHL) |
| 23 | Scott Hannan (D) | Canada | San Jose Sharks (from Philadelphia via Carolina)^{6} | Kelowna Rockets (WHL) |
| 24 | Jean-Francois Damphousse (G) | Canada | New Jersey Devils | Moncton Wildcats (QMJHL) |
| 25 | Brenden Morrow (LW) | Canada | Dallas Stars | Portland Winter Hawks (WHL) |
| 26 | Kevin Grimes (D) | Canada | Colorado Avalanche | Kingston Frontenacs (OHL) |

1. Toronto's first-round pick went to the Islanders as the result of a trade on March 13, 1996 that sent Wendel Clark, Mathieu Schneider and D.J. Smith to Toronto in exchange for Sean Haggerty, Darby Hendrickson, Kenny Jonsson and this pick.
2. Carolina's first-round pick went to Boston as the result of a trade on August 26, 1994 that sent Glen Wesley to Hartford in exchange for first-round picks of the 1995 entry draft and the 1996 entry draft along with this pick. Hartford relocated to Carolina after the 1996–97 NHL season.
3. St. Louis' first-round pick went to Los Angeles as the result of a trade on February 27, 1996 that sent Wayne Gretzky to St. Louis in exchange for Craig Johnson, Patrice Tardif, Roman Vopat, a fifth-round pick of the 1996 entry draft and this pick.
  St. Louis' first-round pick was re-acquired as the result of a trade with Edmonton on August 4, 1995 that sent Curtis Joseph and the rights to Mike Grier to Edmonton in exchange a first-round pick in the 1997 Entry Draft and this pick.
  Edmonton previously acquired this pick and a first-round pick in the 1997 Entry Draft as compensation on July 28, 1995 after St. Louis signed free agent Shayne Corson.
4. Phoenix's first-round pick went to Chicago as the result of a trade on August 16, 1996 that sent Jeremy Roenick to Phoenix in exchange for Craig Mills, Alexei Zhamnov and this pick.
5. Detroit's first-round pick went to Hartford as the result of a trade on October 9, 1996 that sent Brian Glynn and Brendan Shanahan to Detroit in exchange for Paul Coffey, Keith Primeau and this pick. Hartford relocated to Raleigh to become the Carolina Hurricanes after the 1996–97 NHL season.
6. Carolina's acquired first-round pick went to San Jose as the result of a trade on June 21, 1997 that sent a second-round in the 1997 Entry Draft and a third-round pick in the 1998 entry draft to Carolina in exchange for this pick.
  Hartford's previously acquired this pick as the result of a trade on December 15, 1996 that sent Paul Coffey and a third-round pick in the 1997 Entry Draft to Philadelphia in exchange for Kevin Haller, a seventh-round pick in the 1997 Entry Draft and this pick. Hartford relocated to Raleigh to become the Carolina Hurricanes after the 1996–97 NHL season.

=== Round two ===
| # | Player | Nationality | NHL team | College/junior/club team |
|---|---|---|---|---|
| 27 | Ben Clymer (RW) | United States | Boston Bruins | University of Minnesota (WCHA) |
| 28 | Brad DeFauw (LW) | United States | Carolina Hurricanes (from San Jose)^{1} | University of North Dakota (WCHA) |
| 29 | Scott Barney (C) | Canada | Los Angeles Kings | Peterborough Petes (OHL) |
| 30 | Jean-Marc Pelletier (G) | United States | Philadelphia Flyers (from Toronto)^{2} | Cornell University (ECAC) |
| 31 | Jeff Zehr (LW) | Canada | New York Islanders | Windsor Spitfires (OHL) |
| 32 | Evan Lindsay (G) | Canada | Calgary Flames | Prince Albert Raiders (WHL) |
| 33 | Kyle Kos (D) | Canada | Tampa Bay Lightning | Red Deer Rebels (WHL) |
| 34 | Ryan Bonni (D) | Canada | Vancouver Canucks (from Carolina)^{3} | Saskatoon Blades (WHL) |
| 35 | Jean-Francois Fortin (D) | Canada | Washington Capitals | Sherbrooke Faucons (QMJHL) |
| 36 | Harold Druken (C) | Canada | Vancouver Canucks | Detroit Whalers (OHL) |
| 37 | Gregor Baumgartner (RW) | Austria | Montreal Canadiens | Laval Titan College Francais (QMJHL) |
| 38 | Stanislav Gron (C) | Slovakia | New Jersey Devils (from Ottawa)^{4} | Slovan Bratislava (Slovakia) |
| 39 | Jeremy Reich (C) | Canada | Chicago Blackhawks | Seattle Thunderbirds (WHL) |
| 40 | Tyler Rennette (C) | Canada | St. Louis Blues (compensatory)^{5} | North Bay Centennials (OHL) |
| 41 | Patrick Dovigi (G) | Canada | Edmonton Oilers | Erie Otters (OHL) |
| 42 | John Tripp (RW) | Canada | Calgary Flames (from St. Louis)^{6} | Oshawa Generals (OHL) |
| 43 | Juha Gustafsson (D) | Finland | Phoenix Coyotes | Kiekko-Espoo (Finland) |
| 44 | Brian Gaffaney (D) | United States | Pittsburgh Penguins | North Iowa Huskies (USHL) |
| 45 | Maxim Balmochnykh (LW) | Russia | Mighty Ducks of Anaheim | Lada Togliatti (Russia) |
| 46 | Wes Jarvis (D) | Canada | New York Rangers | Kitchener Rangers (OHL) |
| 47 | Kristian Huselius (LW) | Sweden | Florida Panthers | Farjestad BK (Sweden) |
| 48 | Henrik Tallinder (D) | Sweden | Buffalo Sabres | AIK IF Jr. (Sweden) |
| 49 | Yuri Butsayev (LW) | Russia | Detroit Red Wings | Lada Togliatti (Russia) |
| 50 | Pat Kavanagh (RW) | Canada | Philadelphia Flyers | Peterborough Petes (OHL) |
| 51 | Dmitri Kokorev (D) | Russia | Calgary Flames (from New Jersey via Carolina)^{7} | Dynamo Moscow (Russia) |
| 52 | Roman Lyashenko (C) | Russia | Dallas Stars | Torpedo Yaroslavl (Russia) |
| 53 | Graham Belak (LW) | Canada | Colorado Avalanche | Edmonton Ice (WHL) |

1. San Jose's second-round pick went to Carolina as the result of a trade on June 21, 1997 that sent a first-round in the 1997 Entry Draft to San Jose in exchange for a third-round pick in the 1998 entry draft and this pick.
2. Toronto's first-round pick went to Philadelphia as the result of a trade on August 30, 1995 that sent Dmitry Yushkevich and a second-round pick in the 1996 entry draft to Toronto in exchange for a first-round and a fourth-round picks in the 1996 entry draft along with this pick.
3. Carolina's second-round pick went to Vancouver as the result of a trade on December 19, 1995 that sent Jeff Brown and a third-round pick in the 1998 entry draft to Hartford in exchange for Jim Dowd, Frantisek Kucera and this pick. Hartford relocated to Raleigh to become the Carolina Hurricanes after the 1996–97 NHL season.
4. St. Louis' second-round pick went to Calgary as the result of a trade on July 4, 1994 that sent Al MacInnis and a fourth-round pick in the 1997 Entry Draft to St. Louis in exchange for Phil Housley, a second-round pick in the 1996 entry draft and this pick.
5. St. Louis acquired this pick as compensation on July 21, 1996 after the Rangers signed free agent Wayne Gretzky.
6. Ottawa's second-round pick went to New Jersey as the result of a trade on June 21, 1997 that sent two third-round picks (# 58 and # 66 overall) in the 1997 Entry Draft to Ottawa in exchange for this pick.
7. Carolina's second-round pick went to Calgary as the result of a trade on March 5, 1997 that sent Steve Chiasson and a third-round pick in the 1997 Entry Draft to Hartford in exchange for Hnat Domenichelli, Glen Featherstone, a third-round pick in the 1998 entry draft and this pick. Hartford relocated to Raleigh to become the Carolina Hurricanes after the 1996–97 NHL season.
  Hartford previously acquired this pick as the result of a trade on December 19, 1995 that sent Jocelyn Lemieux and a second-round pick in the 1998 entry draft to New Jersey in exchange for Jim Dowd and this pick.

=== Round three ===
| # | Player | Nationality | NHL team | College/junior/club team |
|---|---|---|---|---|
| 54 | Mattias Karlin (C) | Sweden | Boston Bruins | Modo Hockey (Sweden) |
| 55 | Rick Berry (D) | Canada | Colorado Avalanche (from San Jose via St. Louis)^{1} | Seattle Thunderbirds (WHL) |
| 56 | Vratislav Cech (D) | Czech Republic | Florida Panthers (from Los Angeles)^{2} | Kitchener Rangers (OHL) |
| 57 | Jeff Farkas (C) | United States | Toronto Maple Leafs | Boston College (Hockey East) |
| 58 | Jani Hurme (G) | Finland | Ottawa Senators (from New Jersey; compensatory)^{3} | TPS (Finland) |
| 59 | Jarrett Smith (C) | Canada | New York Islanders | Prince George Cougars (WHL) |
| 60 | Derek Schutz (C) | Canada | Calgary Flames | Spokane Chiefs (WHL) |
| 61 | Matt Elich (RW) | United States | Tampa Bay Lightning | Windsor Spitfires (OHL) |
| 62 | Kris Mallette (D) | Canada | Philadelphia Flyers (from Carolina)^{4} | Kelowna Rockets (WHL) |
| 63 | Lee Goren (RW) | Canada | Boston Bruins (from Washington)^{5} | University of North Dakota (WCHA) |
| 64 | Kyle Freadrich (LW) | Canada | Vancouver Canucks | Regina Pats (WHL) |
| 65 | Ilkka Mikkola (D) | Finland | Montreal Canadiens | Karpat (Finland) |
| 66 | Josh Langfeld (RW) | United States | Ottawa Senators (from Ottawa via New Jersey)^{6} | Lincoln Stars (USHL) |
| 67 | Michael Souza (LW) | United States | Chicago Blackhawks | University of New Hampshire (Hockey East) |
| 68 | Sergei Yerkovich (D) | Belarus | Edmonton Oilers | Las Vegas Thunder (IHL) |
| 69 | Maxim Afinogenov (RW) | Russia | Buffalo Sabres (from St. Louis)^{7} | Dynamo Moscow (Russia) |
| 70 | Erik Andersson (RW) | Sweden | Calgary Flames (from Phoenix; compensatory)^{8} | University of Denver (WCHA) |
| 71 | Josef Melichar (D) | Czech Republic | Pittsburgh Penguins | HC Ceske Budejovice (Czech Republic) |
| 72 | Jay Legault (RW) | Canada | Mighty Ducks of Anaheim | London Knights (OHL) |
| 73 | Burke Henry (D) | Canada | New York Rangers | Brandon Wheat Kings (WHL) |
| 74 | Nick Smith (C) | Canada | Florida Panthers | Barrie Colts (OHL) |
| 75 | Jeff Martin (C) | Canada | Buffalo Sabres | Windsor Spitfires (OHL) |
| 76 | Petr Sykora (C) | Czech Republic | Detroit Red Wings | HC Pardubice (Czech Republic) |
| 77 | Steve Gainey (LW) | Canada | Dallas Stars (from Philadelphia)^{9} | Kamloops Blazers (WHL) |
| 78 | Ville Nieminen (LW) | Finland | Colorado Avalanche (from New Jersey via St. Louis)^{10} | Tappara (Finland) |
| 79 | Robert Schnabel (D) | Czech Republic | New York Islanders (from Dallas)^{11} | Slavia Prague (Czech Republic) |
| 80 | Francis Lessard (RW) | Canada | Carolina Hurricanes (from Colorado via New York Islanders and Calgary)^{12} | Val-d'Or Foreurs (QMJHL) |

1. St. Louis' third-round pick went to Colorado as the result of a trade on May 30, 1997 that sent Brent Johnson to St. Louis in exchange for a conditional third-round pick in the 2000 entry draft and this pick. Conditions of the conditional draft pick are unknown.
  St. Louis previously acquired this pick as the result of a trade with San Jose on March 6, 1995 that sent Craig Janney and cash and to San Jose in exchange for Jeff Norton and this pick. The pick was a conditional third-round pick at the time of the trade and conditions of the pick are unknown.
2. Los Angeles' third-round pick went to Florida as the result of a trade on November 28, 1996 that sent Brad Smyth to Los Angeles in exchange for this pick.
3. New Jersey's acquired third-round pick went to Ottawa as the result of a trade on June 21, 1997 that sent a second-round pick in the 1997 Entry Draft to New Jersey in exchange for a third-round pick (# 66 overall) in the 1997 Entry Draft and this pick.
  New Jersey acquired this pick as compensation on July 22, 1996 after Washington signed free agent Phil Housley.
4. Carolina's third-round pick went to Philadelphia as the result of a trade on December 15, 1996 that sent Kevin Haller, a first-round and seventh-round picks in the 1997 Entry Draft to Hartford in exchange for Paul Coffey and this pick. Hartford relocated to Raleigh to become the Carolina Hurricanes after the 1996–97 NHL season.
5. Washington's third-round pick went to Boston as the result of a trade on March 1, 1997 that sent Adam Oates, Bill Ranford and Rick Tocchet to Washington in exchange for Jason Allison, Jim Carey, Anson Carter, a conditional second-round pick in the 1998 entry draft and this pick.
6. Ottawa's third-round pick was re-acquired as the result of a trade on June 21, 1997 that sent a second-round pick in the 1997 Entry Draft to New Jersey in exchange for a third-round pick (# 58 overall) in the 1997 Entry Draft and this pick.
  New Jersey acquired this pick from Ottawa as compensation on October 5, 1995 after Ottawa claimed Tom Chorske off waivers.
7. St. Louis' third-round pick went to Buffalo as the result of a trade on March 20, 1996 that sent Yuri Khmylev and an eighth-round pick in the 1996 Entry Draft to St. Louis in exchange for Jean-Luc Grand-Pierre, a second-round pick in the 1996 entry draft and this pick.
8. Calgary acquired this pick as compensation on July 1, 1996 after Phoenix hired Don Hay as head coach.
9. Philadelphia's third-round pick went to Dallas as the result of a trade on June 21, 1997 that sent a second-round pick in the 1998 entry draft to Philadelphia in exchange for this pick.
10. St. Louis' third-round pick went to Colorado as the result of a trade on June 21, 1997 that sent two fourth-round picks in the 1996 entry draft (# 98 and # 106 overall) to St. Louis in exchange for a fifth-round pick in the 1998 entry draft and this pick.
  St. Louis previously acquired this pick as the result of a trade with New Jersey on November 1, 1995 that sent Esa Tikkanen to New Jersey in exchange for this pick.
11. Dallas' third-round pick went to the Islanders as the result of a trade on June 1, 1996 that sent Brad Lukowich to Dallas in exchange for this pick.
12. Calgary's acquired third-round pick went to Carolina as the result of a trade on March 5, 1997 that sent Hnat Domenichelli, Glen Featherstone, a second-round pick in the 1997 Entry Draft and a third-round pick in the 1998 entry draft to Calgary in exchange for Steve Chiasson and this pick. Hartford relocated to Raleigh to become the Carolina Hurricanes after the 1996–97 NHL season.
  Calgary previously acquired this pick as the result of a trade with the Islanders on November 27, 1996 that sent Paul Kruse to the Islanders in exchange for this pick.
  The Islanders previously acquired this pick as the result of a trade with Colorado on September 4, 1996 that sent Brent Severyn to Colorado in exchange for this pick.

=== Round four ===
| # | Player | Nationality | NHL team | College/junior/club team |
|---|---|---|---|---|
| 81 | Karol Bartanus (RW) | Slovakia | Boston Bruins | Drummondville Voltigeurs (QMJHL) |
| 82 | Adam Colagiacomo (RW) | Canada | San Jose Sharks (from San Jose via New York Rangers)^{1} | Oshawa Generals (OHL) |
| 83 | Joe Corvo (D) | United States | Los Angeles Kings | Western Michigan University (CCHA) |
| 84 | Adam Mair (C) | Canada | Toronto Maple Leafs | Owen Sound Platers (OHL) |
| 85 | Petr Mika (RW) | Czech Republic | New York Islanders | Slavia Prague (Czech Republic) |
| 86 | Didier Tremblay (D) | Canada | St. Louis Blues (from Calgary)^{2} | Halifax Mooseheads (QMJHL) |
| 87 | Brad Larsen (LW) | Canada | Colorado Avalanche (from Tampa Bay)^{3} | Swift Current Broncos (WHL) |
| 88 | Shane Willis (RW) | Canada | Carolina Hurricanes | Lethbridge Hurricanes (WHL) |
| 89 | Curtis Cruickshank (G) | Canada | Washington Capitals | Kingston Frontenacs (OHL) |
| 90 | Chris Stanley (C) | Canada | Vancouver Canucks | Belleville Bulls (OHL) |
| 91 | Daniel Tetrault (D) | Canada | Montreal Canadiens | Brandon Wheat Kings (WHL) |
| 92 | Chris St. Croix (D) | United States | Calgary Flames (from Ottawa)^{4} | Kamloops Blazers (WHL) |
| 93 | Tomi Kallarsson (D) | Finland | New York Rangers (from Chicago via San Jose)^{5} | HPK Jr. (Finland) |
| 94 | Jonas Elofsson (D) | Sweden | Edmonton Oilers | Farjestad BK (Sweden) |
| 95 | Ivan Novoseltsev (RW) | Russia | Florida Panthers (from St. Louis)^{6} | Krylya Sovetov (Russia) |
| 96 | Scott McCallum (D) | Canada | Phoenix Coyotes | Tri-City Americans (WHL) |
| 97 | Alexandre Mathieu (C) | Canada | Pittsburgh Penguins | Halifax Mooseheads (QMJHL) |
| 98 | Jan Horacek (D) | Czech Republic | St. Louis Blues (from Anaheim via Colorado)^{7} | Slavia Prague (Czech Republic) |
| 99 | Sean Blanchard (D) | Canada | Los Angeles Kings (from New York Rangers)^{8} | Ottawa 67's (OHL) |
| 100 | Ryan Ready (LW) | Canada | Calgary Flames (from Florida)^{9} | Belleville Bulls (OHL) |
| 101 | Luc Theoret (D) | Canada | Buffalo Sabres | Lethbridge Hurricanes (WHL) |
| 102 | Quintin Laing (LW) | Canada | Detroit Red Wings | Kelowna Rockets (WHL) |
| 103 | Mikhail Chernov (D) | Russia | Philadelphia Flyers | Torpedo Yaroslavl (Russia) |
| 104 | Lucas Nehrling (D) | Canada | New Jersey Devils | Sarnia Sting (OHL) |
| 105 | Marcus Kristoffersson (LW) | Sweden | Dallas Stars | Mora IK (Sweden) |
| 106 | Jame Pollock (D) | Canada | St. Louis Blues (from Colorado)^{10} | Seattle Thunderbirds (WHL) |

1. San Jose's sixth-round pick was re-acquired as the result of a trade on June 21, 1997 that sent fourth-round (# 93 overall) and sixth-round picks in the 1997 Entry Draft to the Rangers in exchange for this pick.
  The Rangers previously acquired this pick as the result of a trade on August 20, 1996 that sent Marty McSorley to San Jose in exchange for Jayson More, Brian Swanson and this pick.
2. Calgary's fourth-round pick went to St. Louis as the result of a trade on July 4, 1994 that sent Phil Housley, second-round picks in the 1996 entry draft and 1997 Entry Draft to Calgary in exchange for Al MacInnis and this pick.
3. Tampa Bay's fourth-round pick went to Colorado as the result of a trade on October 5, 1995 that sent Steven Finn to Tampa Bay in exchange for this pick.
4. Ottawa's fourth-round pick went to Calgary as the result of a trade on October 7, 1995 that sent Frank Musil to Ottawa in exchange for this pick.
5. San Jose's fourth-round pick went to the Rangers as the result of a trade on June 21, 1997 that sent a fourth-round pick in the 1997 Entry Draft to San Jose in exchange for a sixth-round pick in the 1997 Entry Draft and this pick.
  San Jose previously acquired this pick as the result of a trade on February 6, 1995 that sent Jimmy Waite to Chicago in exchange for this pick.
6. St. Louis' fourth-round pick went to Florida as the result of a trade on September 28, 1995 that sent Dallas Eakins to St. Louis in exchange for this pick
7. Colorado's acquired fourth-round pick went to St. Louis as the result of a trade on June 21, 1997 that sent a third-round pick in the 1997 Entry Draft and a fifth-round pick in the 1998 entry draft to Colorado in exchange for a fourth-round pick (# 106 overall) in the 1997 Entry Draft and this pick.
  Quebec previously acquired this pick as the result of a trade on March 9, 1995 that sent Dave Karpa to Anaheim in exchange for this pick. Quebec relocated to Denver and became the Colorado Avalanche after the 1994–95 NHL season.
8. The Rangers' fourth-round pick went to Los Angeles as the result of a trade on March 14, 1996 that sent Shane Churla, Jari Kurri and Marty McSorley to the Rangers in exchange for Ray Ferraro, Nathan LaFayette, Ian Laperriere, Mattias Norstrom and this pick.
9. Florida's fourth-round pick went to Calgary as the result of a trade on September 29, 1994 that sent Robert Svehla and Magnus Svensson to Philadelphia in exchange for a third-round pick in the 1996 entry draft and this pick.
10. Colorado's fourth-round pick went to St. Louis as the result of a trade on June 21, 1997 that sent a third-round pick in the 1997 Entry Draft and a fifth-round pick in the 1998 entry draft to Colorado in exchange for a fourth-round pick in (# 98 overall) the 1997 Entry Draft and this pick.

=== Round five ===
| # | Player | Nationality | NHL team | College/junior/club team |
|---|---|---|---|---|
| 107 | Adam Spylo (RW) | Canada | San Jose Sharks (from Boston)^{1} | Erie Otters (OHL) |
| 108 | Mark Thompson (D) | Canada | Tampa Bay Lightning (from San Jose)^{2} | Regina Pats (WHL) |
| 109 | Jan Sulc (C) | Czech Republic | Tampa Bay Lightning (from Los Angeles)^{3} | HC Chemopetrol Jr. (Czech Republic) |
| 110 | Ben Simon (LW) | United States | Chicago Blackhawks (compensatory)^{4} | University of Notre Dame (CCHA) |
| 111 | Frantisek Mrazek (C) | Czech Republic | Toronto Maple Leafs | HC Ceske Budejovice (Czech Republic) |
| 112 | Karel Betik (D) | Czech Republic | Tampa Bay Lightning (from New York Islanders)^{5} | Kelowna Rockets (WHL) |
| 113 | Martin Moise (LW) | Canada | Calgary Flames | Beauport Harfangs (QMJHL) |
| 114 | David Darguzas (LW) | Canada | Vancouver Canucks (from Tampa Bay)^{6} | Edmonton Ice (WHL) |
| 115 | Adam Edinger (C) | United States | New York Islanders (from Carolina)^{7} | Bowling Green State University (CCHA) |
| 116 | Kevin Caulfield (RW) | United States | Washington Capitals | Boston College (Hockey East) |
| 117 | Matt Cockell (G) | Canada | Vancouver Canucks | Saskatoon Blades (WHL) |
| 118 | Konstantin Sidulov (D) | Russia | Montreal Canadiens | Mechel Chelyabinsk (Russia) |
| 119 | Magnus Arvedson (LW) | Sweden | Ottawa Senators | Farjestad BK (Sweden) |
| 120 | Pete Gardiner (RW) | Canada | Chicago Blackhawks | Rensselaer Polytechnic Institute (ECAC) |
| 121 | Jason Chimera (LW) | Canada | Edmonton Oilers | Medicine Hat Tigers (WHL) |
| 122 | Gennady Razin (D) | Ukraine | Montreal Canadiens (from St. Louis)^{8} | Kamloops Blazers (WHL) |
| 123 | Curtis Suter (D) | Canada | Phoenix Coyotes | Spokane Chiefs (WHL) |
| 124 | Harlan Pratt (D) | Canada | Pittsburgh Penguins | Prince Albert Raiders (WHL) |
| 125 | Luc Vaillancourt (G) | Canada | Mighty Ducks of Anaheim | Beauport Harfangs (QMJHL) |
| 126 | Jason McLean (G) | Canada | New York Rangers | Moose Jaw Warriors (WHL) |
| 127 | Pat Parthenais (D) | United States | Florida Panthers | Detroit Whalers (OHL) |
| 128 | Torrey DiRoberto (C) | United States | Buffalo Sabres | Seattle Thunderbirds (WHL) |
| 129 | John Wikstrom (D) | Sweden | Detroit Red Wings | Lulea HF (Sweden) |
| 130 | Kyle Calder (LW) | Canada | Chicago Blackhawks (from Philadelphia)^{9} | Regina Pats (WHL) |
| 131 | Jiri Bicek (RW) | Slovakia | New Jersey Devils | HC Kosice (Slovakia) |
| 132 | Teemu Elomo (LW) | Finland | Dallas Stars | TPS (Finland) |
| 133 | Aaron Miskovich (C) | United States | Colorado Avalanche | Green Bay Gamblers (USHL) |
| 134 | Johan Lindbom (LW) | Sweden | New York Rangers (compensatory)^{10} | HV71 (Sweden) |

1. Boston's fifth-round pick went to San Jose as the result of a trade on September 30, 1996 that sent Rob DiMaio to Boston in exchange for this pick.
2. San Jose's fifth-round pick went to Tampa Bay as the result of a trade on June 21, 1997 that sent Shawn Burr to San Jose in exchange for this pick.
3. Los Angeles' fifth-round pick went to Tampa Bay as the result of a trade on August 22, 1996 that sent Petr Klima to Los Angeles in exchange for this pick.
4. Chicago acquired this pick as compensation on July 8, 1996 after St. Louis signed free agent Joe Murphy.
5. The Islanders' fifth-round pick went to Tampa Bay as the result of a trade on September 14, 1995 that sent Alexander Semak to the Islanders in exchange for this pick.
6. Tampa Bay's fifth-round pick went to Vancouver as the result of a trade on March 23, 1995 that sent Adrien Plavsic to Tampa Bay in exchange for this pick.
7. Carolina's fifth-round pick went to the Islanders as the result of a trade on March 18, 1997 that sent Derek King to Hartford in exchange for this pick. Hartford relocated to Raleigh to become the Carolina Hurricanes after the 1996–97 NHL season.
8. St. Louis' fifth-round pick went to Montreal as the result of a trade on October 29, 1996 that sent Craig Conroy, Rory Fitzpatrick and Pierre Turgeon to St. Louis in exchange for Murray Baron, Shayne Corson and this pick.
9. Philadelphia's fifth-round pick went to Chicago as the result of a trade on February 16, 1995 that sent Karl Dykhuis to Philadelphia in exchange for Bob Wilkie and this pick.
10. The Rangers acquired this pick as compensation on September 10, 1996 after Anaheim signed free agent Jari Kurri.

=== Round six ===
| # | Player | Nationality | NHL team | College/junior/club team |
|---|---|---|---|---|
| 135 | Denis Timofeyev (D) | Russia | Boston Bruins | CSKA Moscow (Russia) |
| 136 | Mike York (LW) | United States | New York Rangers (from San Jose)^{1} | Michigan State University (CCHA) |
| 137 | Richard Seeley (D) | Canada | Los Angeles Kings | Prince Albert Raiders (WHL) |
| 138 | Eric Gooldy (LW) | United States | Toronto Maple Leafs | Detroit Whalers (OHL) |
| 139 | Bobby Leavins (LW) | Canada | New York Islanders | Brandon Wheat Kings (WHL) |
| 140 | Ilya Demidov (D) | Russia | Calgary Flames (from Calgary via New York Islanders)^{2} | Dynamo Moscow (Russia) |
| 141 | Peter Sarno (C) | Canada | Edmonton Oilers (from Tampa Bay)^{3} | Windsor Spitfires (OHL) |
| 142 | Kyle Dafoe (D) | Canada | Carolina Hurricanes | Owen Sound Platers (OHL) |
| 143 | Henrik Petre (D) | Sweden | Washington Capitals | Djurgardens IF Jr. (Sweden) |
| 144 | Matt Cooke (LW) | Canada | Vancouver Canucks | Windsor Spitfires (OHL) |
| 145 | Jonathan Desroches (D) | Canada | Montreal Canadiens | Granby Predateurs (QMJHL) |
| 146 | Jeff Sullivan (D) | Canada | Ottawa Senators | Halifax Mooseheads (QMJHL) |
| 147 | Heath Gordon (LW) | United States | Chicago Blackhawks | Green Bay Gamblers (USHL) |
| 148 | Larry Shapley (D) | Canada | Vancouver Canucks (from Edmonton)^{4} | Welland Jr. Canadians (GOJHL) |
| 149 | Nicholas Bilotto (D) | Canada | St. Louis Blues | Beauport Harfangs (QMJHL) |
| 150 | Jeff Katcher (D) | Canada | Los Angeles Kings (compensatory)^{5} | Brandon Wheat Kings (WHL) |
| 151 | Robert Francz (LW) | Germany | Phoenix Coyotes | Peterborough Petes (OHL) |
| 152 | Petr Havelka (LW) | Czech Republic | Pittsburgh Penguins | Sparta Prague (Czech Republic) |
| 153 | Andrei Skopintsev (D) | Russia | Tampa Bay Lightning (from Anaheim)^{6} | TPS (Finland) |
| 154 | Shawn Degagne (G) | Canada | New York Rangers | Kitchener Rangers (OHL) |
| 155 | Keith Delaney (C) | Canada | Florida Panthers | Barrie Colts (OHL) |
| 156 | Brian Campbell (D) | Canada | Buffalo Sabres | Ottawa 67's (OHL) |
| 157 | B. J. Young (RW) | United States | Detroit Red Wings | Red Deer Rebels (WHL) |
| 158 | Jordon Flodell (D) | Canada | Philadelphia Flyers | Moose Jaw Warriors (WHL) |
| 159 | Sascha Goc (D) | Germany | New Jersey Devils | Schwenninger Wild Wings (Germany) |
| 160 | Alexei Timkin (LW) | Ukraine | Dallas Stars | Torpedo Yaroslavl (Russia) |
| 161 | David Aebischer (G) | Switzerland | Colorado Avalanche | HC Fribourg-Gotteron (Switzerland) |

1. San Jose's sixth-round pick went to the Rangers as the result of a trade on June 21, 1997 that sent a fourth-round pick (# 82 overall) in the 1997 Entry Draft to San Jose in exchange for a fourth-round pick (# 93 overall) in the 1997 Entry Draft and this pick.
2. Calgary's sixth-round pick was re-acquired as the result of a trade on March 18, 1997 that sent Robert Reichel to the Islanders in exchange for Tyrone Garner, Marty McInnis and this pick.
  The Islanders previously acquired this pick as the result of a trade on March 20, 1996 that sent Bob Sweeney to Calgary in exchange for Pat Conacher and this pick.
3. Tampa Bay's sixth-round pick went to Edmonton as the result of a trade on March 18, 1997 that sent Jeff Norton to Tampa Bay in exchange for Drew Bannister and this pick.
4. Edmonton's sixth-round pick went to Vancouver as the result of a trade on August 24, 1995 that sent Brett Hauer to Edmonton in exchange for this pick.
5. Los Angeles acquired this pick as compensation on August 15, 1996 after San Jose signed free agent Tony Granato.
6. Anaheim's sixth-round pick went to Tampa Bay as the result of a trade on November 18, 1996 that sent Brian Bellows to Anaheim in exchange for this pick.

=== Round seven ===
| # | Player | Nationality | NHL team | College/junior/club team |
|---|---|---|---|---|
| 162 | Joel Trottier (RW) | Canada | Boston Bruins | Ottawa 67's (OHL) |
| 163 | Joe Dusbabek (RW) | United States | San Jose Sharks | University of Notre Dame (CCHA) |
| 164 | Todd Fedoruk (LW) | Canada | Philadelphia Flyers (from Los Angeles)^{1} | Kelowna Rockets (WHL) |
| 165 | Hugo Marchand (D) | Canada | Toronto Maple Leafs | Victoriaville Tigres (QMJHL) |
| 166 | Kris Knoblauch (LW) | Canada | New York Islanders | Edmonton Ice (WHL) |
| 167 | Jeremy Rondeau (LW) | Canada | Calgary Flames | Swift Current Broncos (WHL) |
| 168 | Justin Jack (RW) | Canada | Tampa Bay Lightning | Kelowna Rockets (WHL) |
| 169 | Andrew Merrick (C) | United States | Carolina Hurricanes (from Carolina via Philadelphia)^{2} | University of Michigan (CCHA) |
| 170 | Eero Somervuori (RW) | Finland | Tampa Bay Lightning (from Washington)^{3} | Jokerit (Finland) |
| 171 | Rod Leroux (D) | Canada | Vancouver Canucks | Seattle Thunderbirds (WHL) |
| 172 | Ben Guite (C) | Canada | Montreal Canadiens | University of Maine (Hockey East) |
| 173 | Robin Bacul (RW) | Czech Republic | Ottawa Senators | Slavia Prague (Czech Republic) |
| 174 | Jerad Smith (D) | Canada | Chicago Blackhawks | Portland Winter Hawks (WHL) |
| 175 | Johan Holmqvist (G) | Sweden | New York Rangers (compensatory)^{4} | Brynas IF (Sweden) |
| 176 | Kevin Bolibruck (D) | Canada | Edmonton Oilers | Peterborough Petes (OHL) |
| 177 | Ladislav Nagy (LW) | Slovakia | St. Louis Blues | HC Kosice (Slovakia) |
| 178 | Tony Mohagen (LW) | Canada | Mighty Ducks of Anaheim (from Phoenix via Philadelphia)^{5} | Seattle Thunderbirds (WHL) |
| 179 | Mark Moore (D) | Canada | Pittsburgh Penguins | Harvard University (ECAC) |
| 180 | Jim Baxter (D) | Canada | Boston Bruins (compensatory)^{6} | Oshawa Generals (OHL) |
| 181 | Mat Snesrud (D) | United States | Mighty Ducks of Anaheim | North Iowa Huskies (USHL) |
| 182 | Mike Mottau (D) | United States | New York Rangers | Boston College (Hockey East) |
| 183 | Tyler Palmer (D) | Canada | Florida Panthers | Lake Superior State University (CCHA) |
| 184 | Jeremy Adduono (RW) | Canada | Buffalo Sabres | Sudbury Wolves (OHL) |
| 185 | Samuel St. Pierre (RW) | Canada | Tampa Bay Lightning (compensatory)^{7} | Victoriaville Tigres (QMJHL) |
| 186 | Mike Laceby (C) | Canada | Detroit Red Wings | Kingston Frontenacs (OHL) |
| 187 | Chad Hinz (C) | Canada | Edmonton Oilers (from Philadelphia)^{8} | Moose Jaw Warriors (WHL) |
| 188 | Mathieu Benoit (RW) | Canada | New Jersey Devils | Chicoutimi Sagueneens (QMJHL) |
| 189 | Jeff McKercher (D) | Canada | Dallas Stars | Barrie Colts (OHL) |
| 190 | Shawn Thornton (LW) | Canada | Toronto Maple Leafs (from Colorado)^{9} | Peterborough Petes (OHL) |

1. Los Angeles' fourth-round pick was re-acquired as the result of a trade with Philadelphia on March 19, 1996 that sent John Druce and a fourth-round pick in the 1996 entry draft to Philadelphia in exchange for this pick.
2. Carolina's seventh-round pick was re-acquired as the result of a trade with Philadelphia on December 15, 1996 that sent Paul Coffey and a third-round pick in the 1997 Entry Draft to Philadelphia in exchange for Kevin Haller, a first-round pick in the 1997 Entry Draft and this pick.
  Philadelphia previously acquired this pick as the result of a trade on December 28, 1995 that sent Kevin Dineen to Hartford in exchange for this pick. Hartford relocated to Raleigh to become the Carolina Hurricanes after the 1996–97 NHL season.
3. Tampa Bay's seventh-round pick went to Washington as the result of a trade on November 15, 1995 that sent Eric Charron to Tampa Bay in exchange for this pick.
4. The Rangers acquired this pick as compensation on September 28, 1996 after Edmonton signed free agent Kevin Lowe.
5. Philadelphia's acquired seventh-round pick went to Anaheim as the result of a trade on February 6, 1996 that sent Bob Corkum to Philadelphia in exchange for Chris Herperger and this pick.
  Philadelphia previously acquired this pick as the result of a trade on September 20, 1995 that sent Andre Faust to Winnipeg in exchange for this pick. Winnipeg relocated to Arizona after the 1995–96 NHL season.
6. Boston acquired this pick as compensation on July 11, 1996 after Dallas signed free agent Dave Reid.
7. Tampa Bay acquired this pick as compensation on October 24, 1996 after Edmonton signed free agent Michel Petit.
8. Philadelphia's seventh-round pick went to Edmonton as the result of a trade on June 18, 1997 that sent the rights to Martin Cerven to Philadelphia in exchange for this pick.
9. Colorado's seventh-round pick went to Toronto as the result of a trade on October 2, 1995 that sent Warren Rychel to Colorado in exchange for this pick.

=== Round eight ===
| # | Player | Nationality | NHL team | College/junior/club team |
|---|---|---|---|---|
| 191 | Antti Laaksonen (LW) | Finland | Boston Bruins | University of Denver (WCHA) |
| 192 | Cam Severson (LW) | Canada | San Jose Sharks | Prince Albert Raiders (WHL) |
| 193 | Jay Kopischke (LW) | United States | Los Angeles Kings | North Iowa Huskies (USHL) |
| 194 | Russ Bartlett (C) | United States | Toronto Maple Leafs | Phillips Exeter Academy (USHS-New Hampshire) |
| 195 | Niklas Nordgren (LW) | Sweden | Carolina Hurricanes (compensatory)^{1} | Modo Hockey Jr. (Sweden) |
| 196 | Jeremy Symington (G) | Canada | New York Islanders | Petrolia Jets (WOHL) |
| 197 | Petr Kubos (D) | Czech Republic | Montreal Canadiens (from Calgary)^{2} | Petra Vsetin (Czech Republic) |
| 198 | Shawn Skolney (D) | Canada | Tampa Bay Lightning | Seattle Thunderbirds (WHL) |
| 199 | Randy Fitzgerald (LW) | Canada | Carolina Hurricanes | Detroit Whalers (OHL) |
| 200 | Pierre-Luc Therrien (G) | Canada | Washington Capitals | Drummondville Voltigeurs (QMJHL) |
| 201 | Denis Martynyuk (LW) | Russia | Vancouver Canucks | CSKA Moscow (Russia) |
| 202 | Andrei Sidyakin (RW) | Russia | Montreal Canadiens | Salavat Yulaev Ufa (Russia) |
| 203 | Nick Gillis (RW) | United States | Ottawa Senators | Cushing Academy (USHS–MA) |
| 204 | Sergei Shikhanov (RW) | Russia | Chicago Blackhawks | Lada Togliatti (Russia) |
| 205 | Chris Kerr (D) | Canada | Edmonton Oilers | Sudbury Wolves (OHL) |
| 206 | Bob Haglund (LW) | United States | St. Louis Blues | Des Moines Buccaneers (USHL) |
| 207 | Aleksandrs Andrejevs (D) | Latvia | Phoenix Coyotes | Weyburn Red Wings (SJHL) |
| 208 | Andrew Ference (D) | Canada | Pittsburgh Penguins | Portland Winter Hawks (WHL) |
| 209 | Rene Stussi (C) | Switzerland | Mighty Ducks of Anaheim | HC Thurgau (Switzerland) |
| 210 | Andrew Proskurnicki (LW) | Canada | New York Rangers | Sarnia Sting (OHL) |
| 211 | Doug Schueller (D) | United States | Florida Panthers | Twin Cities Vulcans (USHL) |
| 212 | Kamil Piros (RW) | Czech Republic | Buffalo Sabres | HC Chemopetrol Jr. (Czech Republic) |
| 213 | Steve Wilejto (C) | Canada | Detroit Red Wings | Prince Albert Raiders (WHL) |
| 214 | Marko Kauppinen (D) | Finland | Philadelphia Flyers | JYP (Finland) |
| 215 | Scott Clemmensen (G) | United States | New Jersey Devils | Des Moines Buccaneers (USHL) |
| 216 | Alexei Komarov (D) | Russia | Dallas Stars | Torpedo Yaroslavl (Russia) |
| 217 | Doug Schmidt (D) | United States | Colorado Avalanche | Waterloo Black Hawks (USHL) |

1. Carolina acquired this pick as compensation on July 16, 1996 after Phoenix signed free agent Brad McCrimmon.
2. Calgary's eight-round pick went to Montreal as the result of a trade on November 25, 1995 that sent Craig Ferguson and Yves Sarault to Calgary in exchange for this pick.

=== Round nine ===
| # | Player | Nationality | NHL team | College/junior/club team |
|---|---|---|---|---|
| 218 | Eric Van Acker (D) | Canada | Boston Bruins | Chicoutimi Sagueneens (QMJHL) |
| 219 | Mark Smith (C) | Canada | San Jose Sharks | Lethbridge Hurricanes (WHL) |
| 220 | Konrad Brand (D) | Canada | Los Angeles Kings | Medicine Hat Tigers (WHL) |
| 221 | Jonathan Hedstrom (RW) | Sweden | Toronto Maple Leafs | Skelleftea AIK (Sweden) |
| 222 | Ryan Clark (D) | United States | New York Islanders | Lincoln Stars (USHL) |
| 223 | Dustin Paul (RW) | Canada | Calgary Flames | Moose Jaw Warriors (WHL) |
| 224 | Paul Comrie (C) | Canada | Tampa Bay Lightning | University of Denver (WCHA) |
| 225 | Kent McDonell (RW) | Canada | Carolina Hurricanes | Guelph Storm (OHL) |
| 226 | Matt Oikawa (RW) | Canada | Washington Capitals | St. Lawrence University (ECAC) |
| 227 | Peter Brady (G) | Canada | Vancouver Canucks | Powell River Paper Kings (BCJHL) |
| 228 | Jarl-Espen Ygranes (D) | Norway | Montreal Canadiens | Furuset (Norway) |
| 229 | Karel Rachunek (D) | Czech Republic | Ottawa Senators | HC Zlin (Czech Republic) |
| 230 | Chris Feil (D) | United States | Chicago Blackhawks | Ohio State University (CCHA) |
| 231 | Alexander Fomichev (G) | Russia | Edmonton Oilers | St. Albert Saints (AJHL) |
| 232 | Dmitri Plekhanov (D) | Russia | St. Louis Blues | Neftekhimik Nizhnekamsk (Russia) |
| 233 | Wyatt Smith (C) | United States | Phoenix Coyotes | University of Minnesota (WCHA) |
| 234 | Eric Lind (D) | United States | Pittsburgh Penguins | Avon Old Farms (USHS–CT) |
| 235 | Tommi Degerman (C) | Finland | Mighty Ducks of Anaheim | Boston University (Hockey East) |
| 236 | Richard Miller (D) | United States | New York Rangers | Providence College (Hockey East) |
| 237 | Benoit Cote (C) | United States | Florida Panthers | Shawinigan Cataractes (QMJHL) |
| 238 | Dylan Kemp (D) | Canada | Buffalo Sabres | Lethbridge Hurricanes (WHL) |
| 239 | Greg Willers (D) | Canada | Detroit Red Wings | Kingston Frontenacs (OHL) |
| 240 | Par Styf (D) | Sweden | Philadelphia Flyers | Modo Hockey Jr. (Sweden) |
| 241 | Jan Srdinko (D) | Czech Republic | New Jersey Devils | Petra Vsetin (Czech Republic) |
| 242 | Brett McLean (C) | Canada | Dallas Stars | Kelowna Rockets (WHL) |
| 243 | Kyle Kidney (LW) | United States | Colorado Avalanche | Salisbury School (USHS–CT) |
| 244 | Marek Ivan (LW) | Czech Republic | St. Louis Blues (compensatory)^{1} | Lethbridge Hurricanes (WHL) |
| 245 | Steve Lafleur (D) | Canada | Colorado Avalanche (from Boston; compensatory)^{2} | Belleville Bulls (OHL) |
| 246 | Jay Henderson (LW) | Canada | Boston Bruins (from Colorado; compensatory)^{3} | Edmonton Ice (WHL) |

1. St. Louis acquired this pick as compensation on September 26, 1996 after Buffalo signed free agent Charlie Huddy.
2. Boston's acquired ninth-round pick went to Colorado as the result of a trade on June 21, 1997 that sent a ninth-round pick (# 246 overall) in the 1997 Entry Draft to Boston in exchange for this pick.
  Boston previously acquired this pick as compensation on September 5, 1996 after Pittsburgh signed free agent Joe Mullen.
3. Colorado's acquired ninth-round pick went to Boston as the result of a trade on June 21, 1997 that sent a ninth-round pick (# 245 overall) in the 1997 Entry Draft to Colorado in exchange for this pick.
  Colorado previously acquired this pick as compensation on September 13, 1996 after Ottawa signed free agent Dave Hannan.

== Draftees based on nationality ==
| Rank | Country | Amount | Percentage |
|---|---|---|---|
| | North America | 169 | 68.7% |
| 1 | Canada | 129 | 52.4% |
| 2 | United States | 40 | 16.3% |
| | Europe | 77 | 31.3% |
| 3 | Russia | 18 | 7.3% |
| 4 | Czech Republic | 16 | 6.5% |
| 5 | Sweden | 15 | 6.1% |
| 6 | Finland | 12 | 4.9% |
| 7 | Slovakia | 6 | 2.4% |
| 8 | Switzerland | 3 | 1.2% |
| 9 | Germany | 2 | 0.8% |
| 9 | Ukraine | 2 | 0.8% |
| 9 | Austria | 1 | 0.4% |
| 12 | Belarus | 1 | 0.4% |
| 12 | Latvia | 1 | 0.4% |

== See also ==
- 1997–98 NHL season
- List of NHL first overall draft choices
- List of NHL players
