= Harlan Pratt =

Canadian ice hockey defenceman

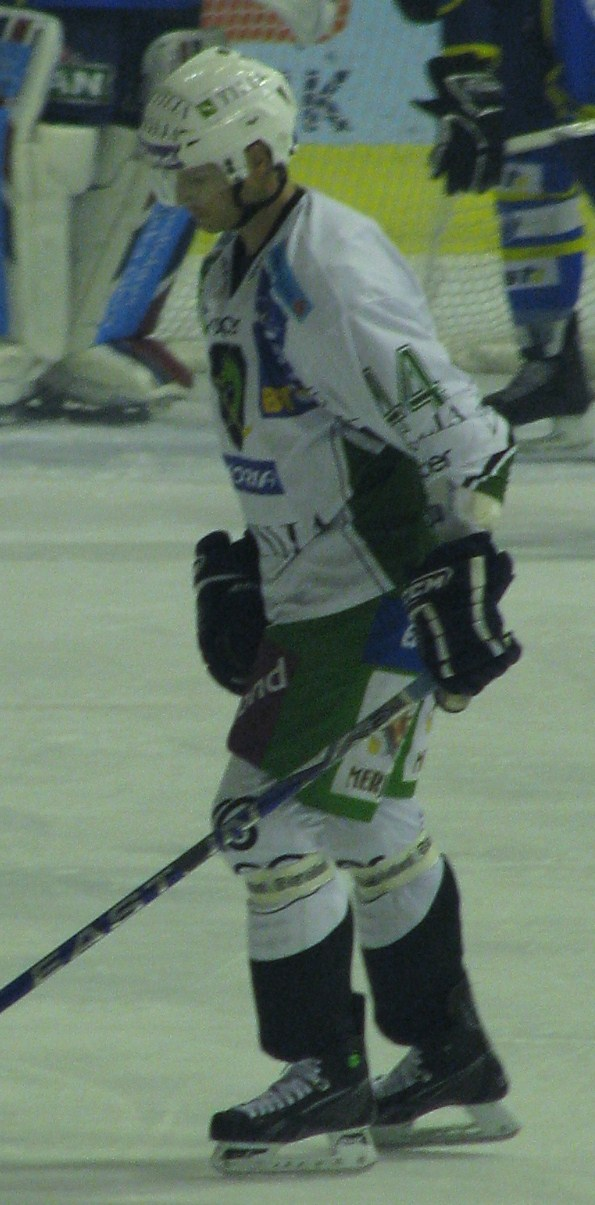
- Born: December 10, 1978 (age 47) Redwater, Alberta, Canada
- Height: 6 ft 1 in (185 cm)
- Weight: 195 lb (88 kg; 13 st 13 lb)
- Position: Defence
- Shot: Right
- Played for: Cincinnati Cyclones; Lowell Lock Monsters; Springfield Falcons; Cincinnati Mighty Ducks; TPS; HC Merano; Bridgeport Sound Tigers; Augsburger Panther; Vienna Capitals; Kölner Haie; HDD Olimpija Ljubljana; Alba Volán Székesfehérvár
- NHL draft: 124th overall, 1997; Pittsburgh Penguins
- Playing career: 1998–2013

Harlan Pratt (born December 10, 1978) is a Canadian former professional ice hockey defenceman.

== Career ==
Pratt was drafted by the Pittsburgh Penguins in the fifth round of the 1997 NHL Entry Draft. He has played over 900 games in eleven different leagues across North America and Europe. Pratt was selected to represent the Kölner Haie in the Deutsche Eishockey Liga's All-Star Game during the 2007–08 season.

== Personal ==
Pratt's older brother Nolan is a former NHL defenseman who played 592 games with 5 teams from 1996 until 2008 and was a member of two Stanley Cup-winning teams (Colorado Avalanche (2000–01) and Tampa Bay Lightning (2003–04)). Nolan retired from professional hockey after the 2010-11 SM-liiga season. Had two children with his wife Jules, Harland (2007) and Quinn (2010), where they moved frequently for his career.

== Career statistics ==
			Regular season					Playoffs
Season	Team	League	GP	G	A	Pts	PIM	GP	G	A	Pts	PIM
1994–95	Seattle Thunderbirds	WHL	33	1	0	1	17	1	0	0	0	0
1995–96	Red Deer Rebels	WHL	60	2	3	5	22	10	0	0	0	4
1996–97	Red Deer Rebels	WHL	2	0	0	0	2	—	—	—	—	—
1996–97	Prince Albert Raiders	WHL	65	7	26	33	49	4	1	1	2	4
1997–98	Prince Albert Raiders	WHL	37	6	14	20	12	—	—	—	—	—
1997–98	Regina Pats	WHL	24	2	6	8	23	9	2	2	4	2
1998–99	Portland Winter Hawks	WHL	10	1	3	4	10	21	14	6	20	20
1998–99	Toledo Storm	ECHL	61	4	35	39	32	3	0	0	0	0
1999–00	Florida Everblades	ECHL	68	4	29	33	38	5	0	1	1	2
2000–01	Cincinnati Cyclones	IHL	73	6	23	29	45	2	0	1	1	2
2001–02	Lowell Lock Monsters	AHL	17	1	6	7	6	—	—	—	—	—
2001–02	Florida Everblades	ECHL	13	0	7	7	4	—	—	—	—	—
2001–02	Springfield Falcons	AHL	19	0	4	4	17	—	—	—	—	—
2001–02	Pensacola Ice Pilots	ECHL	17	2	8	10	14	3	0	4	4	2
2002–03	Springfield Falcons	AHL	13	1	0	1	2	—	—	—	—	—
2002–03	Pensacola Ice Pilots	ECHL	2	0	1	1	2	—	—	—	—	—
2002–03	Cincinnati Mighty Ducks	AHL	43	4	6	10	34	—	—	—	—	—
2003–04	TPS	Liiga	3	0	0	0	0	—	—	—	—	—
2003–04	HC Merano	Italy	33	5	11	16	18	3	1	0	1	0
2004–05	Springfield Falcons	AHL	63	1	6	7	16	—	—	—	—	—
2005–06	Springfield Falcons	AHL	37	0	9	9	14	—	—	—	—	—
2005–06	Bridgeport Sound Tigers	AHL	33	0	6	6	10	7	0	1	1	4
2006–07	Augsburger Panther	DEL	52	11	16	27	62	—	—	—	—	—
2006–07	Vienna Capitals	EBEL	3	1	0	1	4	3	0	1	1	6
2007–08	Augsburger Panther	DEL	56	17	23	40	36	—	—	—	—	—
2008–09	Kölner Haie	DEL	42	1	7	8	38	—	—	—	—	—
2009–10	Olimpija Ljubljana	EBEL	43	2	21	23	40	5	0	1	1	20
2010–11	Tingsryds AIF	Allsvenskan	40	0	5	5	41	8	0	1	1	4
2011–12	Alba Volán Székesfehérvár	EBEL	48	5	14	19	46	6	1	4	5	6
2012–13	Alba Volán Székesfehérvár	EBEL	53	7	21	28	14	—	—	—	—	—
AHL totals			225	7	37	44	99	7	0	1	1	4
