= Petr Kuboš =

Czech ice hockey player

- Born: September 10, 1979 (age 46) Vsetín, Czechoslovakia
- Height: 6 ft 2 in (188 cm)
- Weight: 201 lb (91 kg; 14 st 5 lb)
- Position: Defence
- Shoots: Right
- Czech Extraliga team Former teams: HC Kometa Brno; VHK Vsetín; HC Znojemští Orli; HC Vitkovice; HC Slavia Praha
- NHL draft: 197th overall, 1997; Montreal Canadiens
- Playing career: 1999–present

Petr Kuboš (born September 10, 1979) is a Czech professional ice hockey defenceman. He currently plays for HC Kometa Brno of the Czech Extraliga. He was selected by the Montreal Canadiens in the 8th round (197th overall) of the 1997 NHL entry draft.

Kuboš previously played also for HC Vsetín, HC Znojemští Orli and HC Vítkovice.
