= Andrei Sidyakin =

Russian ice hockey player

- Born: April 20, 1979 (age 46); Ufa, Soviet Union
- Height: 6 ft 0 in (183 cm)
- Weight: 185 lb (84 kg; 13 st 3 lb)
- Position: Right wing
- Shoots: Left
- KHL team Former teams: HC Spartak Moscow; Severstal Cherepovets; Salavat Yulaev Ufa
- National team: Russia
- NHL draft: 202nd overall, 1997; Montreal Canadiens
- Playing career: 1994–present

Andrei Sidyakin (Russian: Андрей Сидякин; born 20 April 1979) is a Russian ice hockey forward who is currently playing for HC Spartak Moscow team in Russia. Sidyakin played more 600 games and scored 110 goals in Russian championship (in highest division).
