= Gennady Razin =

Ukrainian ice hockey player

- Born: February 3, 1978 (age 48) Kharkiv, Ukrainian SSR, Soviet Union
- Height: 6 ft 5 in (196 cm)
- Weight: 209 lb (95 kg; 14 st 13 lb)
- Position: Defence
- Shot: Left
- KHL team Former teams: HC Donbass; Traktor Chelyabinsk
- National team: Ukraine
- NHL draft: 122nd overall, 1997; Montreal Canadiens
- Playing career: 1998–2014

Hennadiy Viktorovich "Gennady" Razin (Ukrainian: Геннадій Вікторович Разін; born February 3, 1978) is a Ukrainian former professional ice hockey defenceman who last played for HC Donbass of the Kontinental Hockey League (KHL). He was selected by the Montreal Canadiens in the 5th round (122nd overall) of the 1997 NHL entry draft.

On May 1, 2013, HC Donbass of the KHL signed Razin to a one-year contract.

== Career statistics ==
			Regular season					Playoffs
Season	Team	League	GP	G	A	Pts	PIM	GP	G	A	Pts	PIM
1996–97	Kamloops Blazers	WHL	63	7	19	26	56	3	0	0	0	4
1997–98	Kamloops Blazers	WHL	70	2	11	13	64	7	0	0	0	4
1998–99	Fredericton Canadiens	AHL	48	0	3	3	16	4	0	0	0	2
1999–00	Quebec Citadelles	AHL	66	2	9	11	29	3	0	0	0	0
2000–01	Quebec Citadelles	AHL	69	3	19	22	25	9	0	0	0	4
2001–02	Quebec Citadelles	AHL	75	2	7	9	14	3	1	1	2	2
2002–03	Amur Khabarovsk	Russia	13	0	0	0	10	—	—	—	—	—
2002–03	Amur Khabarovsk-2	Russia3	3	0	0	0	0	—	—	—	—	—
2003–04	Amur Khabarovsk	Russia	56	3	5	8	67	—	—	—	—	—
2003–04	Amur Khabarovsk-2	Russia3	2	0	0	0	0	—	—	—	—	—
2004–05	Ak Bars Kazan	Russia	7	0	0	0	8	—	—	—	—	—
2004–05	Ak Bars Kazan-2	Russia3	—	—	—	—	—	—	—	—	—	—
2004–05	Neftekhimik Nizhnekamsk	Russia	23	6	0	6	10	—	—	—	—	—
2005–06	Ak Bars Kazan	Russia	16	0	1	1	20	10	0	1	1	12
2005–06	Ak Bars Kazan-2	Russia3	—	—	—	—	—	—	—	—	—	—
2006–07	Ak Bars Kazan	Russia	35	1	1	2	28	16	1	1	2	8
2007–08	HC Dynamo Moscow	Russia	28	3	6	9	16	—	—	—	—	—
2008–09	HC Dynamo Moscow	KHL	45	3	8	11	46	10	0	1	1	6
2009–10	Neftekhimik Nizhnekamsk	KHL	40	1	3	4	34	—	—	—	—	—
2010–11	Traktor Chelyabinsk	KHL	53	3	9	12	40	—	—	—	—	—
2011–12	Traktor Chelyabinsk	KHL	52	2	4	6	24	12	0	1	1	6
2012–13	Traktor Chelyabinsk	KHL	47	0	5	5	18	25	0	2	2	16
2013–14	Donbass Donetsk	KHL	49	2	1	3	22	11	0	0	0	8
AHL totals			258	7	38	45	84	19	1	1	2	8
Russia totals			178	13	13	26	159	26	1	2	3	20
KHL totals			286	11	30	41	184	58	0	4	4	36
