= List of Montreal Canadiens draft picks =

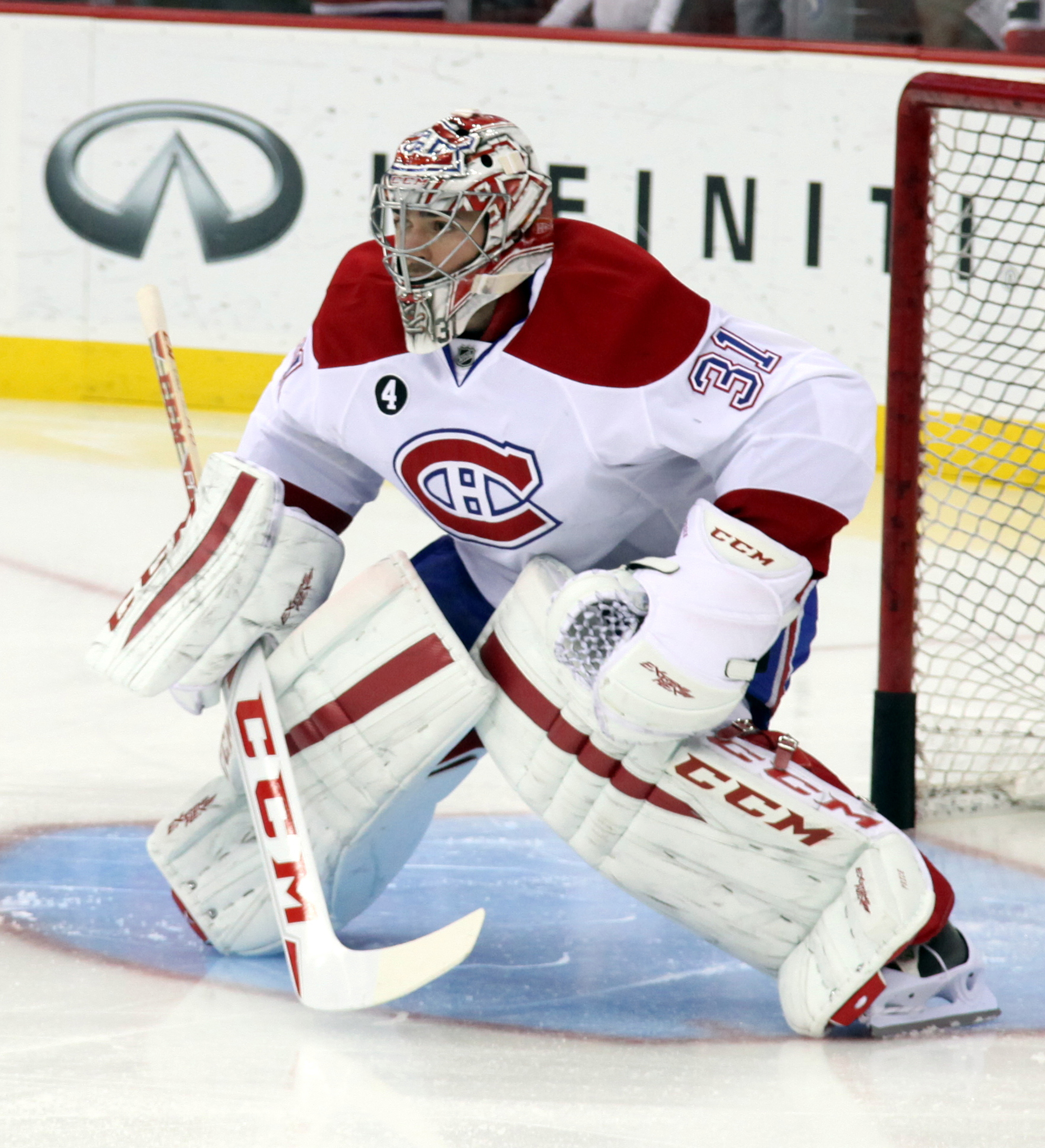
The Canadiens selected Carey Price fifth overall in the 2005 NHL entry draft.

This is a complete list of ice hockey players who were selected in the National Hockey League (NHL) entry draft by the Montreal Canadiens franchise. It includes every player who was drafted, regardless of whether they played for the team.

The annual NHL entry draft is held each June, allowing teams to select players who have turned 18 years old by September 15 in the year the draft is held. The draft order is determined by the previous season's order of finish, with non-playoff teams drafting first, followed by the teams that made the playoffs, with the specific order determined by the number of points earned by each team. The NHL holds a weighted lottery for the 16 non-playoff teams, allowing the winner to move up a maximum of four positions in the entry draft. The team with the fewest points has the best chance of winning the lottery, with each successive team given a lower chance of moving up in the draft. Between 1986 and 1994, the NHL also held a supplemental draft for players in American colleges.

== Key ==
Played at least one game with the Canadiens
Spent entire NHL career with the Canadiens

General terms and abbreviations
Term or abbreviation	Definition
Draft	The year that the player was selected
Round	The round of the draft in which the player was selected
Pick	The overall position in the draft at which the player was selected
S	Supplemental draft selection

Position abbreviations
Abbreviation	Definition
G	Goaltender
D	Defence
LW	Left wing
C	Centre
RW	Right wing
F	Forward

Abbreviations for statistical columns
Abbreviation	Definition
Pos	Position
GP	Games played
G	Goals
A	Assists
Pts	Points
PIM	Penalties in minutes
W	Wins
L	Losses
T	Ties
OT	Overtime/shootout losses
GAA	Goals against average
—	Does not apply

== First round picks ==
Year	Overall	Player	Nationality	Drafted from
1963	1	Garry Monahan	Canada	St. Michael's Buzzers (MetJHL)
1964	6	Claude Chagnon	Canada	Rosemount Midgets (SAAAMHL)
1965	5	Pierre Bouchard	Canada	St. Vincent de Paul Saints (LHJAA)
1966	5	Phil Myre	Canada	Shawinigan Bruins (QJHL)
1967	8	Elgin McCann	Canada	Weyburn Red Wings (WCJHL)
1968	1	Michel Plasse	Canada	Drummondville Rangers (QJHL)
1968	2	Roger Belisle	Canada	Montreal North Beavers (LHIQ)
1968	3	Jim Pritchard	Canada	Winnipeg Jets (WCJHL)
1969	1	Rejean Houle	Canada	Montreal Junior Canadiens (OHA)
1969	2	Marc Tardif	Canada	Montreal Junior Canadiens (OHA)
1970	5	Ray Martynuik	Canada	Flin Flon Bombers (WCJHL)
1970	6	Chuck Lefley	Canada	Canadian National Development Team
1971	1	Guy Lafleur	Canada	Quebec Remparts (QMJHL)
1971	11	Murray Wilson	Canada	Ottawa 67s (OHA)
1972	4	Steve Shutt	Canada	Toronto Marlboros (OHA)
1972	6	Michel Larocque	Canada	Ottawa 67s (OHA)
1972	8	Dave Gardner	Canada	Toronto Marlboros (OHA)
1972	14	John Van Boxmeer	Canada	Guelph Platers (SOJHL)
1973	8	Bob Gainey	Canada	Peterborough Petes (OHA)
1974	5	Cam Connor	Canada	Flin Flon Bombers (WCHL)
1974	7	Doug Risebrough	Canada	Kitchener Rangers (OHA)
1974	10	Rick Chartraw	United States	Kitchener Rangers (OHA)
1974	12	Mario Tremblay	Canada	Montreal Bleu Blanc Rouge (QMJHL)
1974	15	Gord McTavish	Canada	Sudbury Wolves (QMJHL)
1975	9	Robin Sadler	Canada	Edmonton Oil Kings (WCHL)
1975	15	Pierre Mondou	Canada	Montreal Bleu Blanc Rouge (QMJHL)
1976	12	Peter Lee	Canada	Ottawa 67s (OMJHL)
1976	13	Rod Schutt	Canada	Sudbury Wolves (OMJHL)
1976	18	Bruce Baker	Canada	Ottawa 67s (OMJHL)
1977	10	Mark Napier	Canada	Birmingham Bulls (WHA)
1977	18	Norm Dupont	Canada	Montreal Juniors (QMJHL)
1978	8	Danny Geoffrion	Canada	Cornwall Royals (QMJHL)
1978	17	Dave Hunter	Canada	Sudbury Wolves (OMJHL)
1980	1	Doug Wickenheiser	Canada	Regina Pats (WHL)
1981	7	Mark Hunter	Canada	Brantford Alexanders (OHL)
1981	18	Gilbert Delorme	Canada	Chicoutimi Saguenéens (QMJHL)
1981	18	Jan Ingman	Sweden	Färjestad BK (Elitserien)
1982	19	Alain Heroux	Canada	Chicoutimi Saguenéens (QMJHL)
1983	19	Alfie Turcotte	United States	Portland Winter Hawks (WHL)
1984	5	Petr Svoboda	Czech Republic	CHZ Litvinov (Czech)
1984	8	Shayne Corson	Canada	Brantford Alexanders (OHL)
1985	12	Jose Charbonneau	Canada	Drummondville Voltigeurs (QMJHL)
1985	16	Tom Chorske	United States	Minneapolis Southwest HS (USHS–MN)
1986	15	Mark Pederson	Canada	Medicine Hat Tigers (WHL)
1987	17	Andrew Cassels	Canada	Ottawa 67s (OHL)
1988	20	Eric Charron	Canada	Trois-Rivieres Draveurs (QMJHL)
1989	13	Lindsay Vallis	Canada	Seattle Thunderbirds (WHL)
1990	12	Turner Stevenson	Canada	Seattle Thunderbirds (WHL)
1991	17	Brent Bilodeau	United States	Seattle Thunderbirds (WHL)
1992	20	David Wilkie	United States	Kamloops Blazers (WHL)
1993	21	Saku Koivu	Finland	TPS (SM-Liiga)
1994	18	Brad Brown	Canada	North Bay Centennials (OHL)
1995	8	Terry Ryan	Canada	Tri-City Americans (WHL)
1996	18	Matt Higgins	Canada	Moose Jaw Warriors (WHL)
1997	11	Jason Ward	Canada	Erie Otters (OHL)
1998	16	Eric Chouinard	Canada	Quebec Remparts (QMJHL)
2000	13	Ron Hainsey	United States	UMass-Lowell River Hawks (NCAA)
2000	16	Marcel Hossa	Slovakia	Portland Winterhawks (WHL)
2001	7	Mike Komisarek	United States	Michigan Wolverines (NCAA)
2001	25	Alexander Perezhogin	Russia	Avangard Omsk (RSL)
2002	14	Chris Higgins	United States	Yale Bulldogs (NCAA)
2003	10	Andrei Kostitsyn	Belarus	CSKA Moscow (RSL)
2004	18	Kyle Chipchura	Canada	Prince Albert Raiders (WHL)
2005	5	Carey Price	Canada	Tri-City Americans (WHL)
2006	20	David Fischer	United States	Apple Valley HS (USHS–MN)
2007	12	Ryan McDonagh	United States	Cretin-Derham Hall HS (USHS–MN)
2007	22	Max Pacioretty	United States	Sioux City Musketeers (USHL)
2009	18	Louis Leblanc	Canada	Omaha Lancers (USHL)
2010	22	Jarred Tinordi	United States	London Knights (OHL)
2011	17	Nathan Beaulieu	Canada	Saint John Sea Dogs (QMJHL)
2012	3	Alex Galchenyuk	United States	Sarnia Sting (OHL)
2013	25	Michael McCarron	United States	USA NTDP (USHL)
2014	26	Nikita Scherbak	Russia	Saskatoon Blades (WHL)
2015	26	Noah Juulsen	Canada	Everett Silvertips (WHL)
2016	9	Mikhail Sergachev	Russia	Windsor Spitfires (OHL)
2017	25	Ryan Poehling	United States	St. Cloud State Huskies (NCAA)
2018	3	Jesperi Kotkaniemi	Finland	Assat (Liiga)
2019	15	Cole Caufield	United States	U.S. NTDP (USHL)
2020	16	Kaiden Guhle	Canada	Prince Albert Raiders (WHL)
2021	31	Logan Mailloux	Canada	SK Lejon (Hockeyettan)
2022	1	Juraj Slafkovsky	Slovakia	TPS (Liiga)
2022	26	Filip Mesar	Slovakia	HK Poprad (Tipos Extraliga)
2023	5	David Reinbacher	Austria	EHC Kloten (National League)
2024	5	Ivan Demidov	Russia	SKA Saint Petersburg (KHL)
2024	21	Michael Hage	Canada	Chicago Steel (USHL)
2026	26	Gleb Pugachyov	Russia	Torpedo Nizhny Novgorod (KHL)

== Draft picks ==
Statistics are complete as of the 2025–26 NHL season and show each player's career regular season totals in the NHL. Wins, losses, ties, overtime losses and goals against average apply to goaltenders and are used only for players at that position.

Draft	Round	Pick	Player	Nationality	Pos	GP	G	A	Pts	PIM	W	L	T	OT	GAA
1963	1	1	Garry Monahan	Canada	C	748	116	169	285	484	—	—	—	—	—
1963	2	7	Rodney Presswood	Canada	D	—	—	—	—	—	—	—	—	—	—
1963	3	13	Roy Pugh	Canada	C	—	—	—	—	—	—	—	—	—	—
1963	4	18	Glen Shirton	Canada	D	—	—	—	—	—	—	—	—	—	—
1964	1	6	Claude Chagnon	Canada	D	—	—	—	—	—	—	—	—	—	—
1964	2	12	Guy Allen	Canada	D	—	—	—	—	—	—	—	—	—	—
1964	3	18	Paul Reid	Canada	F	—	—	—	—	—	—	—	—	—	—
1964	4	24	Michel Jacques	Canada	LW	—	—	—	—	—	—	—	—	—	—
1965	1	5	Pierre Bouchard	Canada	D	595	24	82	106	433	—	—	—	—	—
1966	1	5	Phil Myre	Canada	G	495	0	10	10	101	149	198	76	—	3.53
1966	2	11	Moe St. Jacques	Canada	C	—	—	—	—	—	—	—	—	—	—
1966	3	17	Jude Drouin	Canada	C	666	151	305	456	346	—	—	—	—	—
1966	4	23	Bob Pate	Canada	D	—	—	—	—	—	—	—	—	—	—
1967	1	8	Elgin McCann	Canada	RW	—	—	—	—	—	—	—	—	—	—
1968	1	1	Michel Plasse	Canada	G	299	0	9	9	62	92	136	54	—	3.79
1968	1	2	Roger Belisle	Canada	C	—	—	—	—	—	—	—	—	—	—
1968	1	3	Jim Pritchard	Canada	D	—	—	—	—	—	—	—	—	—	—
1968	3	23	Don Grierson	Canada	RW	—	—	—	—	—	—	—	—	—	—
1969	1	1	Rejean Houle	Canada	RW	635	161	247	408	395	—	—	—	—	—
1969	1	2	Marc Tardif	Canada	LW	517	194	207	401	443	—	—	—	—	—
1969	3	32	Bobby Sheehan	United States	C	310	48	63	111	40	—	—	—	—	—
1969	4	44	Murray Anderson	Canada	D	40	0	1	1	68	—	—	—	—	—
1969	5	56	Gary Doyle	Canada	G	—	—	—	—	—	—	—	—	—	—
1969	6	63	Guy Delparte	Canada	D	48	1	8	9	18	—	—	—	—	—
1969	6	68	Lynn Powis	Canada	C	130	19	33	52	25	—	—	—	—	—
1969	7	74	Ian Wilkie	Canada	G	—	—	—	—	—	—	—	—	—	—
1969	7	75	Dale Power	Canada	C	—	—	—	—	—	—	—	—	—	—
1969	8	79	Frank Hamill	Canada	F	—	—	—	—	—	—	—	—	—	—
1969	9	83	Gilles Drolet	Canada	D	—	—	—	—	—	—	—	—	—	—
1969	10	84	Darrel Knibbs	Canada	C	—	—	—	—	—	—	—	—	—	—
1970	1	5	Ray Martynuik	Canada	G	—	—	—	—	—	—	—	—	—	—
1970	1	6	Chuck Lefley	Canada	C	407	128	164	292	137	—	—	—	—	—
1970	3	31	Steve Carlyle	Canada	D	—	—	—	—	—	—	—	—	—	—
1970	4	45	Cal Hammond	Canada	G	—	—	—	—	—	—	—	—	—	—
1970	4	52	John French	Canada	LW	—	—	—	—	—	—	—	—	—	—
1970	4	66	Rick Wilson	Canada	D	239	6	26	32	165	—	—	—	—	—
1970	6	80	Bob Brown	Canada	D	—	—	—	—	—	—	—	—	—	—
1970	7	93	Bob Fowler	United States	RW	—	—	—	—	—	—	—	—	—	—
1970	8	105	Ric Jordan	Canada	D	—	—	—	—	—	—	—	—	—	—
1971	1	1	Guy Lafleur	Canada	RW	1126	560	793	1353	399	—	—	—	—	—
1971	1	7	Chuck Arnason	Canada	RW	401	109	90	199	122	—	—	—	—	—
1971	1	11	Murray Wilson	Canada	LW	386	94	95	189	162	—	—	—	—	—
1971	2	20	Larry Robinson	Canada	D	1384	208	750	958	793	—	—	—	—	—
1971	2	24	Michel DeGuise	Canada	G	—	—	—	—	—	—	—	—	—	—
1971	2	25	Terry French	Canada	C	—	—	—	—	—	—	—	—	—	—
1971	3	31	Jim Cahoon	Canada	C	—	—	—	—	—	—	—	—	—	—
1971	4	45	Ed Sidebottom	Canada	D	—	—	—	—	—	—	—	—	—	—
1971	4	53	Greg Hubick	Canada	D	77	6	9	15	10	—	—	—	—	—
1971	5	67	Mike Busniuk	Canada	D	143	3	23	26	297	—	—	—	—	—
1971	6	81	Ross Butler	Canada	LW	—	—	—	—	—	—	—	—	—	—
1971	7	95	Peter Sullivan	Canada	C	126	28	54	82	40	—	—	—	—	—
1972	1	4	Steve Shutt	Canada	RW	930	424	393	817	410	—	—	—	—	—
1972	1	6	Michel Larocque	Canada	G	312	0	18	18	18	160	89	45	—	3.33
1972	1	8	Dave Gardner	Canada	D	350	75	115	190	41	—	—	—	—	—
1972	1	14	John Van Boxmeer	Canada	D	588	84	274	358	465	—	—	—	—	—
1972	3	46	Ed Gilbert	Canada	C	166	21	31	52	22	—	—	—	—	—
1972	4	62	Dave Elenbaas	Canada	G	—	—	—	—	—	—	—	—	—	—
1972	5	66	Bill Nyrop	United States	D	207	12	51	63	101	—	—	—	—	—
1972	6	94	D'Arcy Ryan	Canada	F	—	—	—	—	—	—	—	—	—	—
1972	7	110	Yves Archambault	Canada	G	—	—	—	—	—	—	—	—	—	—
1972	8	126	Graham Parsons	Canada	G	—	—	—	—	—	—	—	—	—	—
1972	9	142	Eddie Bumbacco	Canada	F	—	—	—	—	—	—	—	—	—	—
1972	10	151	Fred Riggall	Canada	RW	—	—	—	—	—	—	—	—	—	—
1972	11	152	Ron Leblanc	Canada	RW	—	—	—	—	—	—	—	—	—	—
1973	1	8	Bob Gainey	Canada	LW	1160	239	262	501	585	—	—	—	—	—
1973	2	17	Glenn Goldup	Canada	F	291	52	67	119	303	—	—	—	—	—
1973	2	22	Peter Marrin	Canada	C	—	—	—	—	—	—	—	—	—	—
1973	2	32	Ron Andruff	Canada	C	153	19	36	55	54	—	—	—	—	—
1973	3	37	Ed Humphreys	Canada	G	—	—	—	—	—	—	—	—	—	—
1973	4	56	Al Hangsleben	United States	D	185	21	48	69	396	—	—	—	—	—
1973	4	64	Richard Latulippe	Canada	C	—	—	—	—	—	—	—	—	—	—
1973	5	80	Gerard Gibbons	Canada	D	—	—	—	—	—	—	—	—	—	—
1973	6	96	Dennis Patry	Canada	F	—	—	—	—	—	—	—	—	—	—
1973	7	112	Michel Belisle	Canada	C	—	—	—	—	—	—	—	—	—	—
1973	8	128	Mario Desjardins	Canada	F	—	—	—	—	—	—	—	—	—	—
1973	9	143	Bob Wright	Canada	F	—	—	—	—	—	—	—	—	—	—
1973	10	158	Alain Labrecque	Canada	LW	—	—	—	—	—	—	—	—	—	—
1973	11	166	Gord Halliday	Canada	F	—	—	—	—	—	—	—	—	—	—
1973	12	167	Cap Raeder	United States	G	—	—	—	—	—	—	—	—	—	—
1973	13	168	Louis Chiasson	Canada	C	—	—	—	—	—	—	—	—	—	—
1974	1	5	Cam Connor	Canada	RW	89	9	22	31	256	—	—	—	—	—
1974	1	7	Doug Risebrough	Canada	C	740	185	286	471	1542	—	—	—	—	—
1974	1	10	Rick Chartraw	United States	D	420	28	64	92	399	—	—	—	—	—
1974	1	12	Mario Tremblay	Canada	RW	852	258	326	584	1043	—	—	—	—	—
1974	1	15	Gord McTavish	Canada	C	11	1	3	4	2	—	—	—	—	—
1974	2	30	Gary MacGregor	Canada	C	—	—	—	—	—	—	—	—	—	—
1974	2	33	Gilles Lupien	Canada	D	226	5	25	30	416	—	—	—	—	—
1974	3	51	Marty Howe	United States	D	197	2	29	31	99	—	—	—	—	—
1974	4	61	Barry Legge	Canada	D	107	1	11	12	144	—	—	—	—	—
1974	4	69	Mike McKegney	Canada	F	—	—	—	—	—	—	—	—	—	—
1974	6	105	John Stewart	Canada	C	2	0	0	0	0	—	—	—	—	—
1974	7	123	Joe Micheletti	United States	D	158	11	60	71	114	—	—	—	—	—
1974	8	140	Jamie Hislop	Canada	RW	345	75	103	178	86	—	—	—	—	—
1974	9	157	Gord Stewart	Canada	F	—	—	—	—	—	—	—	—	—	—
1974	10	172	Chuck Luksa	Canada	D	8	0	1	1	4	—	—	—	—	—
1974	11	187	Cliff Cox	Canada	F	—	—	—	—	—	—	—	—	—	—
1974	12	199	Dave Lumley	Canada	RW	437	98	160	258	680	—	—	—	—	—
1974	13	209	Mike Hobin	Canada	F	—	—	—	—	—	—	—	—	—	—
1975	1	9	Robin Sadler	Canada	D	—	—	—	—	—	—	—	—	—	—
1975	1	15	Pierre Mondou	Canada	RW	548	194	262	456	179	—	—	—	—	—
1975	2	22	Brian Engblom	Canada	D	659	29	177	206	599	—	—	—	—	—
1975	2	34	Kelvin Greenbank	Canada	RW	—	—	—	—	—	—	—	—	—	—
1975	3	51	Paul Woods	Canada	C	501	72	124	196	276	—	—	—	—	—
1975	3	52	Pat Hughes	Canada	RW	573	130	128	258	646	—	—	—	—	—
1975	4	70	Dave Gorman	Canada	RW	3	0	0	0	0	—	—	—	—	—
1975	5	88	Jim Turkiewicz	Canada	D	—	—	—	—	—	—	—	—	—	—
1975	6	106	Michel Lachance	Canada	D	21	0	4	4	22	—	—	—	—	—
1975	7	124	Tim Burke	United States	D	—	—	—	—	—	—	—	—	—	—
1975	8	142	Craig Norwich	United States	D	104	17	58	75	60	—	—	—	—	—
1975	9	158	Paul Clarke	Canada	F	—	—	—	—	—	—	—	—	—	—
1975	10	173	Bob Ferriter	United States	LW	—	—	—	—	—	—	—	—	—	—
1975	11	187	David Bell	Canada	F	—	—	—	—	—	—	—	—	—	—
1975	12	198	Carl Jackson	Canada	G	—	—	—	—	—	—	—	—	—	—
1975	13	204	Michel Brisebois	Canada	RW	—	—	—	—	—	—	—	—	—	—
1975	14	208	Roger Bourque	Canada	D	—	—	—	—	—	—	—	—	—	—
1975	15	211	Jim Lundquist	United States	D	—	—	—	—	—	—	—	—	—	—
1975	16	214	Don Madson	United States	C	—	—	—	—	—	—	—	—	—	—
1975	17	215	Bob Bain	United States	D	—	—	—	—	—	—	—	—	—	—
1976	1	12	Peter Lee	Canada	LW	431	114	131	245	257	—	—	—	—	—
1976	1	13	Rod Schutt	Canada	LW	286	77	92	169	177	—	—	—	—	—
1976	1	18	Bruce Baker	Canada	F	—	—	—	—	—	—	—	—	—	—
1976	2	36	Barry Melrose	Canada	D	300	10	23	33	728	—	—	—	—	—
1976	3	54	Bill Baker	United States	D	143	7	25	32	175	—	—	—	—	—
1976	4	72	Ed Clarey	Canada	RW	—	—	—	—	—	—	—	—	—	—
1976	5	90	Maurice Barrette	Canada	G	—	—	—	—	—	—	—	—	—	—
1976	6	108	Pierre Brassard	Canada	LW	—	—	—	—	—	—	—	—	—	—
1976	7	118	Rich Gosselin	Canada	C	—	—	—	—	—	—	—	—	—	—
1976	8	123	John Gregory	Canada	D	—	—	—	—	—	—	—	—	—	—
1976	9	125	Bruce Horsch	United States	G	—	—	—	—	—	—	—	—	—	—
1976	10	127	John Tavella	Canada	LW	—	—	—	—	—	—	—	—	—	—
1976	11	129	Mark Davidson	Canada	F	—	—	—	—	—	—	—	—	—	—
1976	12	131	Bill Wells	Canada	LW	—	—	—	—	—	—	—	—	—	—
1976	13	133	Ron Wilson	Canada	C	832	110	216	326	415	—	—	—	—	—
1977	1	10	Mark Napier	Canada	RW	767	235	306	541	157	—	—	—	—	—
1977	1	18	Norm Dupont	Canada	LW	256	55	85	140	52	—	—	—	—	—
1977	2	36	Rod Langway	United States	D	994	51	278	329	849	—	—	—	—	—
1977	3	43	Alain Cote	Canada	LW	696	103	190	293	383	—	—	—	—	—
1977	3	46	Pierre Lagace	Canada	C	—	—	—	—	—	—	—	—	—	—
1977	3	49	Moe Robinson	Canada	D	1	0	0	0	0	—	—	—	—	—
1977	3	54	Gordie Roberts	United States	D	1097	61	359	420	1582	—	—	—	—	—
1977	4	64	Robert Holland	Canada	G	44	0	0	0	2	11	22	9	—	4.08
1977	5	90	Gaetan Rochette	Canada	RW	—	—	—	—	—	—	—	—	—	—
1977	6	108	Bill Himmelright	United States	D	—	—	—	—	—	—	—	—	—	—
1977	7	124	Richard Sevigny	Canada	G	176	0	1	1	94	80	54	20	—	3.21
1977	8	137	Keith Hendrickson	United States	D	—	—	—	—	—	—	—	—	—	—
1977	8	140	Mike Reilly	United States	RW	—	—	—	—	—	—	—	—	—	—
1977	9	152	Barry Borrett	Canada	G	—	—	—	—	—	—	—	—	—	—
1977	9	154	Sid Tanchak	Canada	C	—	—	—	—	—	—	—	—	—	—
1977	10	160	Mark Holden	United States	G	8	0	1	1	0	2	2	1	—	4.03
1977	10	162	Craig Laughlin	Canada	RW	549	136	205	341	364	—	—	—	—	—
1977	11	167	Dan Poulin	Canada	D	3	1	1	2	2	—	—	—	—	—
1977	11	169	Tom McDonell	Canada	F	—	—	—	—	—	—	—	—	—	—
1977	12	173	Cary Farelli	Canada	RW	—	—	—	—	—	—	—	—	—	—
1977	12	174	Carey Walker	Canada	G	—	—	—	—	—	—	—	—	—	—
1977	13	176	Mark Wells	United States	C	—	—	—	—	—	—	—	—	—	—
1977	13	177	Stan Palmer	United States	D	—	—	—	—	—	—	—	—	—	—
1977	14	179	Jean Belisle	Canada	G	—	—	—	—	—	—	—	—	—	—
1977	14	180	Bob Daly	Canada	G	—	—	—	—	—	—	—	—	—	—
1977	15	182	Bob Boileau	Canada	D	—	—	—	—	—	—	—	—	—	—
1977	15	183	John Costello	United States	C	—	—	—	—	—	—	—	—	—	—
1978	1	8	Danny Geoffrion	Canada	RW	111	20	32	52	99	—	—	—	—	—
1978	1	17	Dave Hunter	Canada	LW	746	133	190	323	918	—	—	—	—	—
1978	2	30	Dale Yakiwchuk	Canada	LW	—	—	—	—	—	—	—	—	—	—
1978	2	36	Ron Carter	Canada	RW	2	0	0	0	0	—	—	—	—	—
1978	3	42	Richard David	Canada	LW	31	4	4	8	10	—	—	—	—	—
1978	4	69	Kevin Reeves	Canada	C	—	—	—	—	—	—	—	—	—	—
1978	5	86	Mike Boyd	Canada	D	—	—	—	—	—	—	—	—	—	—
1978	6	103	Keith Acton	Canada	C	1023	226	358	584	1172	—	—	—	—	—
1978	7	120	Jim Lawson	Canada	F	—	—	—	—	—	—	—	—	—	—
1978	8	137	Larry Landon	Canada	LW	9	0	0	0	2	—	—	—	—	—
1978	9	154	Kevin Constantine	United States	G	—	—	—	—	—	—	—	—	—	—
1978	10	171	John Swan	Canada	C	—	—	—	—	—	—	—	—	—	—
1978	11	186	Daniel Metivier	Canada	RW	—	—	—	—	—	—	—	—	—	—
1978	12	201	Viacheslav Fetisov	Russia	D	546	36	192	228	656	—	—	—	—	—
1978	13	212	Jeff Mars	United States	F	—	—	—	—	—	—	—	—	—	—
1978	14	222	Greg Tiganelli	United States	LW	—	—	—	—	—	—	—	—	—	—
1978	15	225	George Goulakos	Canada	LW	—	—	—	—	—	—	—	—	—	—
1978	16	227	Ken Moodie	Canada	F	—	—	—	—	—	—	—	—	—	—
1978	17	229	Serge LeBlanc	Canada	D	—	—	—	—	—	—	—	—	—	—
1978	18	230	Bob Magnuson	United States	F	—	—	—	—	—	—	—	—	—	—
1978	19	231	Chris Nilan	United States	RW	688	110	115	225	3043	—	—	—	—	—
1978	20	232	Rick Wilson	Canada	G	—	—	—	—	—	—	—	—	—	—
1978	21	233	Louis Sleigher	Canada	RW	194	46	53	99	146	—	—	—	—	—
1978	22	234	Doug Robb	Canada	RW	—	—	—	—	—	—	—	—	—	—
1979	2	27	Gaston Gingras	Canada	D	476	61	174	235	161	—	—	—	—	—
1979	2	37	Mats Naslund	Sweden	LW	651	251	383	634	111	—	—	—	—	—
1979	3	43	Craig Levie	Canada	D	183	22	53	75	177	—	—	—	—	—
1979	3	44	Guy Carbonneau	Canada	C	1318	260	403	663	820	—	—	—	—	—
1979	3	58	Rick Wamsley	Canada	G	407	0	9	9	52	204	131	46	—	3.34
1979	4	79	Dave Orleski	Canada	LW	2	0	0	0	0	—	—	—	—	—
1979	5	100	Yvan Joly	Canada	RW	2	0	0	0	0	—	—	—	—	—
1979	6	121	Greg Moffett	United States	G	—	—	—	—	—	—	—	—	—	—
1980	1	1	Doug Wickenheiser	Canada	C	556	111	165	276	286	—	—	—	—	—
1980	2	27	Ric Nattress	Canada	D	536	29	135	164	377	—	—	—	—	—
1980	2	40	John Chabot	Canada	C	508	84	228	312	85	—	—	—	—	—
1980	3	45	John Newberry	Canada	C	22	0	4	4	6	—	—	—	—	—
1980	3	61	Craig Ludwig	United States	D	1256	38	184	222	1437	—	—	—	—	—
1980	4	82	Jeff Teal	United States	RW	6	0	1	1	0	—	—	—	—	—
1980	5	103	Remi Gagne	Canada	RW	—	—	—	—	—	—	—	—	—	—
1980	6	124	Mike McPhee	Canada	LW	744	200	199	399	661	—	—	—	—	—
1980	7	145	Bill Norton	United States	LW	—	—	—	—	—	—	—	—	—	—
1980	8	166	Steve Penney	Canada	G	91	0	1	1	17	35	28	12	—	3.62
1980	9	187	John Schmidt	United States	D	—	—	—	—	—	—	—	—	—	—
1980	10	208	Scott Robinson	Canada	G	1	0	0	0	2	—	—	—	—	—
1981	1	7	Mark Hunter	Canada	RW	628	213	171	384	1426	—	—	—	—	—
1981	1	18	Gilbert Delorme	Canada	D	541	31	92	123	520	—	—	—	—	—
1981	1	19	Jan Ingman	Sweden	F	—	—	—	—	—	—	—	—	—	—
1981	2	32	Lars Eriksson	Sweden	G	—	—	—	—	—	—	—	—	—	—
1981	2	40	Chris Chelios	United States	D	1651	185	763	948	2891	—	—	—	—	—
1981	3	46	Dieter Hegen	Germany	LW	—	—	—	—	—	—	—	—	—	—
1981	4	82	Kjell Dahlin	Sweden	F	166	57	59	116	10	—	—	—	—	—
1981	5	88	Steve Rooney	United States	LW	154	15	13	28	496	—	—	—	—	—
1981	6	124	Tom Anastos	United States	C	—	—	—	—	—	—	—	—	—	—
1981	7	145	Tom Kurvers	United States	D	659	93	328	421	350	—	—	—	—	—
1981	8	166	Paul Gess	United States	LW	—	—	—	—	—	—	—	—	—	—
1981	9	187	Scott Ferguson	United States	D	—	—	—	—	—	—	—	—	—	—
1981	10	208	Dan Burrows	Canada	G	—	—	—	—	—	—	—	—	—	—
1982	1	19	Alain Heroux	Canada	LW	—	—	—	—	—	—	—	—	—	—
1982	2	31	Jocelyn Gauvreau	Canada	D	2	0	0	0	0	—	—	—	—	—
1982	2	32	Kent Carlson	United States	D	113	7	11	18	148	—	—	—	—	—
1982	2	33	David Maley	United States	LW	466	43	81	124	1043	—	—	—	—	—
1982	2	40	Scott Sandelin	United States	D	25	0	4	4	2	—	—	—	—	—
1982	3	61	Scott Harlow	United States	LW	1	0	1	1	0	—	—	—	—	—
1982	4	69	John DeVoe	United States	W	—	—	—	—	—	—	—	—	—	—
1982	5	103	Kevin Houle	United States	LW	—	—	—	—	—	—	—	—	—	—
1982	6	117	Ernie Vargas	United States	RW	—	—	—	—	—	—	—	—	—	—
1982	6	124	Mike Dark	Canada	D	43	5	6	11	14	—	—	—	—	—
1982	7	145	Hannu Jarvenpaa	Finland	RW	114	11	26	37	83	—	—	—	—	—
1982	8	150	Steve Smith	United States	D	—	—	—	—	—	—	—	—	—	—
1982	8	166	Tom Koliouspoulos	United States	C	—	—	—	—	—	—	—	—	—	—
1982	9	187	Brian Williams	United States	C	—	—	—	—	—	—	—	—	—	—
1982	10	208	Bob Emery	United States	D	—	—	—	—	—	—	—	—	—	—
1982	11	229	Darren Acheson	Canada	C	—	—	—	—	—	—	—	—	—	—
1982	12	250	Bill Brauer	United States	D	—	—	—	—	—	—	—	—	—	—
1983	1	17	Alfie Turcotte	United States	C	112	17	29	46	49	—	—	—	—	—
1983	2	26	Claude Lemieux	Canada	RW	1215	379	407	786	1777	—	—	—	—	—
1983	2	27	Sergio Momesso	Canada	LW	710	152	193	345	1557	—	—	—	—	—
1983	2	35	Todd Francis	Canada	RW	—	—	—	—	—	—	—	—	—	—
1983	3	45	Daniel Letendre	Canada	RW	—	—	—	—	—	—	—	—	—	—
1983	4	80	John Kordic	Canada	RW	244	17	18	35	997	—	—	—	—	—
1983	5	101	Dan Wurst	United States	D	—	—	—	—	—	—	—	—	—	—
1983	6	122	Arto Javanainen	Finland	RW	14	4	1	5	2	—	—	—	—	—
1983	7	143	Vladislav Tretiak	Russia	G	—	—	—	—	—	—	—	—	—	—
1983	8	164	Rob Bryden	Canada	W	—	—	—	—	—	—	—	—	—	—
1983	9	185	Grant McKay	Canada	D	—	—	—	—	—	—	—	—	—	—
1983	10	206	Thomas Rundqvist	Sweden	C	2	0	1	1	0	—	—	—	—	—
1983	11	227	Jeff Perpich	United States	D	—	—	—	—	—	—	—	—	—	—
1983	12	248	Jean-Guy Bergeron	Canada	D	—	—	—	—	—	—	—	—	—	—
1984	1	5	Petr Svoboda	Czech Republic	D	1028	58	341	399	1605	—	—	—	—	—
1984	1	8	Shayne Corson	Canada	LW	1156	273	420	693	2357	—	—	—	—	—
1984	2	29	Stephane Richer	Canada	LW	1054	421	398	819	614	—	—	—	—	—
1984	3	51	Patrick Roy	Canada	G	1029	0	45	45	262	551	315	131	—	2.54
1984	3	54	Graeme Bonar	Canada	RW	—	—	—	—	—	—	—	—	—	—
1984	4	65	Lee Brodeur	United States	RW	—	—	—	—	—	—	—	—	—	—
1984	5	95	Gerald Johannson	Canada	D	—	—	—	—	—	—	—	—	—	—
1984	6	116	Jim Nesich	United States	C	—	—	—	—	—	—	—	—	—	—
1984	7	137	Scott MacTavish	Canada	D	—	—	—	—	—	—	—	—	—	—
1984	8	158	Brad McCaughey	United States	C	—	—	—	—	—	—	—	—	—	—
1984	9	179	Eric Demers	Canada	LW	—	—	—	—	—	—	—	—	—	—
1984	10	199	Ron Annear	Canada	D	—	—	—	—	—	—	—	—	—	—
1984	11	220	Dave Tanner	Canada	D	—	—	—	—	—	—	—	—	—	—
1984	12	240	Troy Crosby	Canada	G	—	—	—	—	—	—	—	—	—	—
1985	1	12	Jose Charbonneau	Canada	RW	71	9	13	22	67	—	—	—	—	—
1985	1	16	Tom Chorske	United States	LW	596	115	122	237	225	—	—	—	—	—
1985	2	33	Todd Richards	United States	D	8	0	4	4	4	—	—	—	—	—
1985	3	47	Rocky Dundas	Canada	RW	5	0	0	0	14	—	—	—	—	—
1985	4	75	Martin Desjardins	Canada	F	8	0	2	2	2	—	—	—	—	—
1985	4	79	Brent Gilchrist	Canada	LW	792	135	170	305	400	—	—	—	—	—
1985	5	96	Tom Sagissor	United States	C	—	—	—	—	—	—	—	—	—	—
1985	6	117	Donald Dufresne	Canada	D	268	6	36	42	258	—	—	—	—	—
1985	7	142	Ed Cristofoli	Canada	RW	9	0	1	1	4	—	—	—	—	—
1985	8	163	Mike Claringbull	Canada	D	—	—	—	—	—	—	—	—	—	—
1985	9	184	Roger Beedon	United States	G	—	—	—	—	—	—	—	—	—	—
1985	10	198	Maurizio Mansi	Canada	RW	—	—	—	—	—	—	—	—	—	—
1985	10	205	Chad Arthur	United States	LW	—	—	—	—	—	—	—	—	—	—
1985	11	226	Mike Bishop	Canada	D	—	—	—	—	—	—	—	—	—	—
1985	12	247	John Ferguson Jr.	Canada	LW	—	—	—	—	—	—	—	—	—	—
1986	1	15	Mark Pederson	Canada	RW	169	35	50	85	77	—	—	—	—	—
1986	2	27	Benoit Brunet	Canada	LW	539	101	161	262	229	—	—	—	—	—
1986	3	57	Jyrki Lumme	Finland	D	985	114	354	468	620	—	—	—	—	—
1986	4	78	Brent Bobyck	Canada	LW	—	—	—	—	—	—	—	—	—	—
1986	5	94	Eric Aubertin	Canada	LW	—	—	—	—	—	—	—	—	—	—
1986	5	99	Mario Milani	Canada	RW	—	—	—	—	—	—	—	—	—	—
1986	6	120	Steve Bisson	Canada	D	—	—	—	—	—	—	—	—	—	—
1986	7	141	Lyle Odelein	Canada	D	1056	50	202	252	2316	—	—	—	—	—
1986	8	162	Rick Hayward	United States	D	4	0	0	0	5	—	—	—	—	—
1986	9	183	Antonin Routa	Czech Republic	D	—	—	—	—	—	—	—	—	—	—
1986	10	204	Eric Bohemier	Canada	G	—	—	—	—	—	—	—	—	—	—
1986	11	225	Charlie Moore	Canada	LW	—	—	—	—	—	—	—	—	—	—
1986	12	246	Karel Svoboda	Czech Republic	F	—	—	—	—	—	—	—	—	—	—
1986	S	18	Randy Exelby	Canada	G	2	0	0	0	0	0	1	0	—	4.76
1987	1	17	Andrew Cassels	Canada	C	1015	204	528	732	410	—	—	—	—	—
1987	2	33	John LeClair	United States	LW	967	406	413	819	501	—	—	—	—	—
1987	2	38	Eric Desjardins	Canada	D	1143	136	439	575	757	—	—	—	—	—
1987	3	44	Mathieu Schneider	United States	D	1289	223	520	743	1245	—	—	—	—	—
1987	3	58	Francois Gravel	Canada	G	—	—	—	—	—	—	—	—	—	—
1987	4	80	Kris Miller	United States	D	—	—	—	—	—	—	—	—	—	—
1987	5	101	Steve McCool	United States	D	—	—	—	—	—	—	—	—	—	—
1987	6	122	Les Kuntar	United States	G	6	0	0	0	2	2	2	0	—	3.18
1987	7	143	Rob Kelley	United States	LW	—	—	—	—	—	—	—	—	—	—
1987	8	164	Will Geist	United States	D	—	—	—	—	—	—	—	—	—	—
1987	9	185	Eric Tremblay	Canada	D	—	—	—	—	—	—	—	—	—	—
1987	10	206	Barry McKinlay	Canada	D	—	—	—	—	—	—	—	—	—	—
1987	11	227	Ed Ronan	United States	RW	182	13	23	36	101	—	—	—	—	—
1987	12	248	Bryan Herring	United States	C	—	—	—	—	—	—	—	—	—	—
1987	S	18	Wayne Gagne	Canada	D	—	—	—	—	—	—	—	—	—	—
1988	1	20	Eric Charron	Canada	D	130	2	7	9	127	—	—	—	—	—
1988	2	34	Martin St. Amour	Canada	LW	1	0	0	0	2	—	—	—	—	—
1988	3	46	Neil Carnes	United States	C	—	—	—	—	—	—	—	—	—	—
1988	4	83	Patric Kjellberg	Sweden	LW	394	64	96	160	84	—	—	—	—	—
1988	5	93	Peter Popovic	Sweden	D	485	10	63	73	291	—	—	—	—	—
1988	5	104	Jean-Claude Bergeron	Canada	G	72	0	2	2	4	21	33	7	—	3.69
1988	6	125	Patrik Carnback	Sweden	LW	154	24	38	62	122	—	—	—	—	—
1988	7	146	Tim Chase	United States	D	—	—	—	—	—	—	—	—	—	—
1988	8	167	Sean Hill	United States	D	876	62	236	298	1008	—	—	—	—	—
1988	9	188	Harijs Vitolinsh	Latvia	C	8	0	0	0	4	—	—	—	—	—
1988	10	209	Yuri Krivokhizha	Belarus	D	—	—	—	—	—	—	—	—	—	—
1988	11	230	Kevin Dahl	Canada	D	188	7	22	29	153	—	—	—	—	—
1988	12	251	Dave Kunda	Canada	D	—	—	—	—	—	—	—	—	—	—
1988	S	25	Peter Fish	United States	G	—	—	—	—	—	—	—	—	—	—
1989	1	13	Lindsay Vallis	Canada	RW	1	0	0	0	0	—	—	—	—	—
1989	2	30	Patrice Brisebois	Canada	D	1009	98	322	420	623	—	—	—	—	—
1989	2	41	Steve Larouche	Canada	C	26	9	9	18	10	—	—	—	—	—
1989	3	51	Pierre Sevigny	Canada	LW	78	4	5	9	64	—	—	—	—	—
1989	4	83	Andre Racicot	Canada	G	68	0	2	2	6	26	23	8	—	3.50
1989	5	104	Marc Deschamps	Canada	D	—	—	—	—	—	—	—	—	—	—
1989	7	146	Craig Ferguson	United States	C	27	1	1	2	6	—	—	—	—	—
1989	8	167	Patrick Lebeau	Canada	LW	15	3	2	5	6	—	—	—	—	—
1989	9	188	Roy Mitchell	Canada	D	3	0	0	0	0	—	—	—	—	—
1989	10	209	Ed Henrich	United States	D	—	—	—	—	—	—	—	—	—	—
1989	11	230	Justin Duberman	United States	RW	4	0	0	0	0	—	—	—	—	—
1989	12	251	Steve Cadieux	Canada	C	—	—	—	—	—	—	—	—	—	—
1989	S	25	Craig Charron	United States	C	—	—	—	—	—	—	—	—	—	—
1990	1	12	Turner Stevenson	Canada	RW	644	75	115	190	969	—	—	—	—	—
1990	2	39	Ryan Kuwabara	Canada	RW	—	—	—	—	—	—	—	—	—	—
1990	3	58	Charles Poulin	Canada	C	—	—	—	—	—	—	—	—	—	—
1990	3	60	Robert Guillet	Canada	RW	—	—	—	—	—	—	—	—	—	—
1990	4	81	Gilbert Dionne	Canada	LW	223	61	79	140	108	—	—	—	—	—
1990	5	102	Paul DiPietro	Canada	C	192	31	49	80	96	—	—	—	—	—
1990	6	123	Craig Conroy	United States	C	1009	182	360	542	603	—	—	—	—	—
1990	7	144	Stephen Rohr	United States	C	—	—	—	—	—	—	—	—	—	—
1990	8	165	Brent Fleetwood	Canada	LW	—	—	—	—	—	—	—	—	—	—
1990	9	186	Derek Maguire	United States	D	—	—	—	—	—	—	—	—	—	—
1990	10	207	Mark Kettelhut	United States	D	—	—	—	—	—	—	—	—	—	—
1990	11	228	John Uniac	Canada	D	—	—	—	—	—	—	—	—	—	—
1990	12	249	Sergei Martinyuk	Russia	C	—	—	—	—	—	—	—	—	—	—
1990	S	23	Bruce Coles	Canada	LW	—	—	—	—	—	—	—	—	—	—
1991	1	17	Brent Bilodeau	United States	D	—	—	—	—	—	—	—	—	—	—
1991	2	28	Jim Campbell	United States	RW	285	61	75	136	268	—	—	—	—	—
1991	2	43	Craig Darby	United States	C	196	21	35	56	32	—	—	—	—	—
1991	3	61	Yves Sarault	Canada	LW	106	10	10	20	51	—	—	—	—	—
1991	4	73	Vladimir Vujtek	Czech Republic	RW	110	7	30	37	38	—	—	—	—	—
1991	4	83	Sylvain Lapointe	Canada	D	—	—	—	—	—	—	—	—	—	—
1991	5	100	Brad Layzell	Canada	D	—	—	—	—	—	—	—	—	—	—
1991	5	105	Tony Prpic	United States	RW	—	—	—	—	—	—	—	—	—	—
1991	6	127	Oleg Petrov	Russia	LW	382	72	115	187	101	—	—	—	—	—
1991	7	149	Brady Kramer	United States	C	—	—	—	—	—	—	—	—	—	—
1991	8	171	Brian Savage	Canada	LW	674	192	167	359	321	—	—	—	—	—
1991	9	193	Scott Fraser	Canada	C	72	16	15	31	24	—	—	—	—	—
1991	10	215	Greg MacEachern	Canada	D	—	—	—	—	—	—	—	—	—	—
1991	11	237	Paul Lepler	United States	D	—	—	—	—	—	—	—	—	—	—
1991	12	259	Dale Hooper	United States	D	—	—	—	—	—	—	—	—	—	—
1991	S	23	Jeff Torrey	United States	RW	—	—	—	—	—	—	—	—	—	—
1992	1	20	David Wilkie	United States	D	167	10	26	36	165	—	—	—	—	—
1992	2	33	Valeri Bure	Russia	RW	621	174	226	400	221	—	—	—	—	—
1992	2	44	Keli Corpse	Canada	C	—	—	—	—	—	—	—	—	—	—
1992	3	68	Craig Rivet	Canada	D	923	50	187	237	1171	—	—	—	—	—
1992	4	82	Louis Bernard	Canada	D	—	—	—	—	—	—	—	—	—	—
1992	4	92	Marc Lamothe	Canada	G	4	0	0	0	0	2	1	1	—	3.24
1992	5	116	Don Chase	United States	RW	—	—	—	—	—	—	—	—	—	—
1992	6	140	Martin Sychra	Czech Republic	C	—	—	—	—	—	—	—	—	—	—
1992	7	164	Christian Proulx	Canada	D	7	1	2	3	20	—	—	—	—	—
1992	8	188	Michael Burman	Canada	D	—	—	—	—	—	—	—	—	—	—
1992	9	212	Earl Cronan	United States	LW	—	—	—	—	—	—	—	—	—	—
1992	10	236	Trent Cavicchi	Canada	G	—	—	—	—	—	—	—	—	—	—
1992	11	260	Hiroyuki Miura	Japan	D	—	—	—	—	—	—	—	—	—	—
1993	1	21	Saku Koivu	Finland	C	1124	255	577	832	809	—	—	—	—	—
1993	2	47	Rory Fitzpatrick	United States	D	287	10	25	35	201	—	—	—	—	—
1993	3	73	Sebastien Bordeleau	France	C	251	37	61	98	118	—	—	—	—	—
1993	4	85	Adam Wiesel	United States	D	—	—	—	—	—	—	—	—	—	—
1993	4	99	Jean-Francois Houle	Canada	LW	—	—	—	—	—	—	—	—	—	—
1993	5	113	Jeff Lank	Canada	D	2	0	0	0	2	—	—	—	—	—
1993	5	125	Dion Darling	Canada	D	—	—	—	—	—	—	—	—	—	—
1993	6	151	Darcy Tucker	Canada	LW	947	215	261	476	1410	—	—	—	—	—
1993	7	177	David Ruhly	United States	LW	—	—	—	—	—	—	—	—	—	—
1993	8	203	Alan Letang	Canada	D	14	0	0	0	2	—	—	—	—	—
1993	9	229	Alexandre Duchesne	Canada	LW	—	—	—	—	—	—	—	—	—	—
1993	10	255	Brian Larochelle	United States	G	—	—	—	—	—	—	—	—	—	—
1993	11	281	Russ Guzior	United States	C	—	—	—	—	—	—	—	—	—	—
1994	1	18	Brad Brown	Canada	D	330	2	27	29	747	—	—	—	—	—
1994	2	44	Jose Theodore	Canada	G	648	1	16	17	40	286	254	30	39	2.68
1994	3	54	Chris Murray	Canada	RW	242	16	18	34	550	—	—	—	—	—
1994	3	70	Marko Kiprusoff	Finland	D	51	0	10	10	12	—	—	—	—	—
1994	3	74	Martin Belanger	Canada	D	—	—	—	—	—	—	—	—	—	—
1994	4	96	Arto Kuki	Finland	C	—	—	—	—	—	—	—	—	—	—
1994	5	122	Jimmy Drolet	Canada	D	—	—	—	—	—	—	—	—	—	—
1994	6	148	Joel Irving	Canada	RW	—	—	—	—	—	—	—	—	—	—
1994	7	174	Jessie Rezansoff	Canada	RW	—	—	—	—	—	—	—	—	—	—
1994	8	200	Peter Strom	Sweden	RW	—	—	—	—	—	—	—	—	—	—
1994	9	226	Tomas Vokoun	Czech Republic	G	700	0	23	23	125	300	288	35	43	2.55
1994	10	252	Chris Aldous	United States	D	—	—	—	—	—	—	—	—	—	—
1994	11	278	Ross Parsons	Canada	D	—	—	—	—	—	—	—	—	—	—
1995	1	8	Terry Ryan	Canada	C	8	0	0	0	36	—	—	—	—	—
1995	3	60	Miroslav Guren	Czech Republic	D	36	1	3	4	16	—	—	—	—	—
1995	3	74	Martin Hohenberger	Austria	LW	—	—	—	—	—	—	—	—	—	—
1995	4	86	Jonathan Delisle	Canada	RW	1	0	0	0	0	—	—	—	—	—
1995	5	112	Niklas Anger	Sweden	W	—	—	—	—	—	—	—	—	—	—
1995	6	138	Boyd Olson	Canada	C	—	—	—	—	—	—	—	—	—	—
1995	7	164	Stephane Robidas	Canada	D	937	57	201	258	713	—	—	—	—	—
1995	8	190	Greg Hart	Canada	RW	—	—	—	—	—	—	—	—	—	—
1995	9	216	Eric Houde	Canada	C	30	2	3	5	4	—	—	—	—	—
1996	1	18	Matt Higgins	Canada	C	57	1	2	3	6	—	—	—	—	—
1996	2	44	Mathieu Garon	Canada	G	341	0	7	7	28	144	131	20	11	2.83
1996	3	71	Arron Asham	Canada	RW	789	94	114	208	1004	—	—	—	—	—
1996	4	92	Kim Staal	Denmark	W	—	—	—	—	—	—	—	—	—	—
1996	4	99	Etienne Drapeau	Canada	C	—	—	—	—	—	—	—	—	—	—
1996	5	127	Daniel Archambault	Canada	D	—	—	—	—	—	—	—	—	—	—
1996	6	154	Brett Clark	Canada	D	689	45	141	186	293	—	—	—	—	—
1996	7	181	Timo Vertala	Finland	LW	—	—	—	—	—	—	—	—	—	—
1996	8	207	Mattia Baldi	Switzerland	LW	—	—	—	—	—	—	—	—	—	—
1996	9	233	Michel Tremblay	Canada	LW	—	—	—	—	—	—	—	—	—	—
1997	1	11	Jason Ward	Canada	RW	336	36	45	81	171	—	—	—	—	—
1997	2	37	Gregor Baumgartner	Austria	W	—	—	—	—	—	—	—	—	—	—
1997	3	65	Ilkka Mikkola	Finland	D	—	—	—	—	—	—	—	—	—	—
1997	4	91	Daniel Tetrault	Canada	D	—	—	—	—	—	—	—	—	—	—
1997	5	118	Konstantin Sidulov	Russia	D	—	—	—	—	—	—	—	—	—	—
1997	5	122	Gennady Razin	Ukraine	D	—	—	—	—	—	—	—	—	—	—
1997	6	145	Jonathan Desroches	Canada	D	—	—	—	—	—	—	—	—	—	—
1997	7	172	Ben Guite	Canada	C	175	19	26	45	97	—	—	—	—	—
1997	8	197	Petr Kubos	Czech Republic	D	—	—	—	—	—	—	—	—	—	—
1997	8	202	Andrei Sidyakin	Russia	RW	—	—	—	—	—	—	—	—	—	—
1997	9	228	Jarl Espen Ygranes	Norway	D	—	—	—	—	—	—	—	—	—	—
1998	1	16	Eric Chouinard	Canada	LW	90	11	11	22	16	—	—	—	—	—
1998	2	45	Mike Ribeiro	Canada	C	1074	228	565	793	577	—	—	—	—	—
1998	3	75	Francois Beauchemin	Canada	D	903	76	212	288	490	—	—	—	—	—
1998	5	132	Andrei Bashkirov	Russia	LW	30	0	3	3	0	—	—	—	—	—
1998	6	152	Gordie Dwyer	Canada	LW	108	0	5	5	394	—	—	—	—	—
1998	6	162	Andrei Markov	Russia	D	990	119	453	572	505	—	—	—	—	—
1998	7	189	Andrei Kruchinin	Russia	D	—	—	—	—	—	—	—	—	—	—
1998	8	201	Craig Murray	Canada	LW	—	—	—	—	—	—	—	—	—	—
1998	8	216	Michael Ryder	Canada	RW	806	237	247	484	353	—	—	—	—	—
1998	9	247	Darcy Harris	Canada	RW	—	—	—	—	—	—	—	—	—	—
1999	2	39	Alexander Buturlin	Russia	RW	—	—	—	—	—	—	—	—	—	—
1999	2	58	Matt Carkner	Canada	D	237	4	23	27	556	—	—	—	—	—
1999	4	97	Chris Dyment	United States	D	—	—	—	—	—	—	—	—	—	—
1999	4	107	Evan Lindsay	Canada	G	—	—	—	—	—	—	—	—	—	—
1999	5	136	Dustin Jamieson	Canada	LW	—	—	—	—	—	—	—	—	—	—
1999	5	145	Marc-Andre Thinel	Canada	LW	—	—	—	—	—	—	—	—	—	—
1999	5	150	Matt Shasby	United States	D	—	—	—	—	—	—	—	—	—	—
1999	6	167	Sean Dixon	Canada	D	—	—	—	—	—	—	—	—	—	—
1999	7	196	Vadim Tarasov	Russia	G	—	—	—	—	—	—	—	—	—	—
1999	8	225	Mikko Hyytia	Finland	C	—	—	—	—	—	—	—	—	—	—
1999	9	253	Jerome Marois	Canada	LW	—	—	—	—	—	—	—	—	—	—
2000	1	13	Ron Hainsey	United States	D	1068	58	241	299	431	—	—	—	—	—
2000	1	16	Marcel Hossa	Slovakia	W	237	31	30	61	106	—	—	—	—	—
2000	3	78	Jozef Balej	Slovakia	RW	18	1	5	6	4	—	—	—	—	—
2000	3	79	Tyler Hanchuck	Canada	D	—	—	—	—	—	—	—	—	—	—
2000	4	109	Johan Eneqvist	Sweden	C	—	—	—	—	—	—	—	—	—	—
2000	4	114	Christian Larrivee	Canada	LW	—	—	—	—	—	—	—	—	—	—
2000	5	145	Ryan Glenn	Canada	D	—	—	—	—	—	—	—	—	—	—
2000	6	172	Scott Selig	Canada	C	—	—	—	—	—	—	—	—	—	—
2000	6	182	Petr Chvojka	Czech Republic	D	—	—	—	—	—	—	—	—	—	—
2000	8	243	Joni Puurula	Finland	G	—	—	—	—	—	—	—	—	—	—
2000	9	275	Jonathan Gauthier	Canada	D	—	—	—	—	—	—	—	—	—	—
2001	1	7	Mike Komisarek	United States	D	551	14	67	81	679	—	—	—	—	—
2001	1	25	Alexander Perezhogin	Russia	LW	128	15	19	34	86	—	—	—	—	—
2001	2	37	Duncan Milroy	Canada	RW	5	0	1	1	0	—	—	—	—	—
2001	3	71	Tomas Plekanec	Czech Republic	C	1001	233	375	608	543	—	—	—	—	—
2001	4	109	Martti Jarventie	Finland	D	1	0	0	0	0	—	—	—	—	—
2001	6	171	Eric Himelfarb	Canada	C	—	—	—	—	—	—	—	—	—	—
2001	7	203	Andrew Archer	Canada	D	—	—	—	—	—	—	—	—	—	—
2001	9	266	Viktor Ujcik	Czech Republic	LW	—	—	—	—	—	—	—	—	—	—
2002	1	14	Chris Higgins	United States	LW	711	165	168	333	229	—	—	—	—	—
2002	2	45	Tomas Linhart	Czech Republic	D	—	—	—	—	—	—	—	—	—	—
2002	4	99	Michael Lambert	Canada	LW	—	—	—	—	—	—	—	—	—	—
2002	6	182	Andre Deveaux	Canada	RW	31	0	2	2	104	—	—	—	—	—
2002	7	212	Jonathan Ferland	Canada	RW	7	1	0	1	2	—	—	—	—	—
2002	9	275	Konstantin Korneyev	Russia	D	—	—	—	—	—	—	—	—	—	—
2003	1	10	Andrei Kostitsyn	Belarus	W	398	103	119	222	181	—	—	—	—	—
2003	2	40	Cory Urquhart	Canada	C	—	—	—	—	—	—	—	—	—	—
2003	2	61	Maxim Lapierre	Canada	C	614	65	74	139	586	—	—	—	—	—
2003	3	79	Ryan O'Byrne	Canada	D	308	5	34	39	369	—	—	—	—	—
2003	4	113	Corey Locke	Canada	C	9	0	1	1	0	—	—	—	—	—
2003	4	123	Danny Stewart	Canada	C	—	—	—	—	—	—	—	—	—	—
2003	6	177	Christopher Heino-Lindberg	Sweden	G	—	—	—	—	—	—	—	—	—	—
2003	6	188	Mark Flood	Canada	D	39	3	5	8	10	—	—	—	—	—
2003	7	217	Oskari Korpikari	Finland	D	—	—	—	—	—	—	—	—	—	—
2003	8	241	Jimmy Bonneau	Canada	LW	—	—	—	—	—	—	—	—	—	—
2003	9	271	Jaroslav Halak	Slovakia	G	581	0	13	13	16	295	189	—	69	2.50
2004	1	18	Kyle Chipchura	Canada	C	482	31	73	104	364	—	—	—	—	—
2004	3	84	Alexei Emelin	Russia	D	456	15	66	81	363	—	—	—	—	—
2004	4	100	J.T. Wyman	United States	D	44	2	9	11	8	—	—	—	—	—
2004	5	150	Mikhail Grabovski	Belarus	C	534	125	171	296	312	—	—	—	—	—
2004	6	181	Loic Lacasse	Canada	G	—	—	—	—	—	—	—	—	—	—
2004	7	212	Jon Gleed	Canada	D	—	—	—	—	—	—	—	—	—	—
2004	8	246	Greg Stewart	Canada	LW	26	0	1	1	48	—	—	—	—	—
2004	9	262	Mark Streit	Switzerland	D	786	96	338	434	374	—	—	—	—	—
2004	9	278	Alex Dulac-Lemelin	Canada	D	—	—	—	—	—	—	—	—	—	—
2005	1	5	Carey Price	Canada	G	712	0	13	13	51	361	261	—	79	2.51
2005	2	45	Guillaume Latendresse	Canada	W	341	87	60	147	185	—	—	—	—	—
2005	4	121	Juraj Mikus	Slovakia	C	—	—	—	—	—	—	—	—	—	—
2005	5	130	Mathieu Aubin	Canada	C	—	—	—	—	—	—	—	—	—	—
2005	6	190	Matt D'Agostini	Canada	RW	324	52	55	107	147	—	—	—	—	—
2005	7	200	Sergei Kostitsyn	Belarus	W	353	67	109	176	188	—	—	—	—	—
2005	7	229	Philippe Paquet	Canada	D	—	—	—	—	—	—	—	—	—	—
2006	1	20	David Fischer	United States	D	—	—	—	—	—	—	—	—	—	—
2006	2	49	Ben Maxwell	Canada	C	47	2	6	8	19	—	—	—	—	—
2006	2	53	Mathieu Carle	Canada	D	3	0	0	0	4	—	—	—	—	—
2006	3	66	Ryan White	Canada	C	313	31	30	61	447	—	—	—	—	—
2006	5	139	Pavel Valentenko	Russia	D	—	—	—	—	—	—	—	—	—	—
2006	7	199	Cameron Cepek	United States	D	—	—	—	—	—	—	—	—	—	—
2007	1	12	Ryan McDonagh	United States	D	1058	86	355	441	385	—	—	—	—	—
2007	1	22	Max Pacioretty	United States	LW	939	335	346	681	509	—	—	—	—	—
2007	2	43	P.K. Subban	Canada	D	834	115	352	467	905	—	—	—	—	—
2007	3	65	Olivier Fortier	Canada	C	—	—	—	—	—	—	—	—	—	—
2007	3	73	Yannick Weber	Switzerland	D	499	28	66	94	195	—	—	—	—	—
2007	5	133	Joe Stejskal	United States	D	—	—	—	—	—	—	—	—	—	—
2007	5	142	Andrew Conboy	United States	LW	—	—	—	—	—	—	—	—	—	—
2007	6	163	Nichlas Torp	Sweden	D	—	—	—	—	—	—	—	—	—	—
2007	7	192	Scott Kishel	United States	D	—	—	—	—	—	—	—	—	—	—
2008	2	56	Danny Kristo	United States	RW	—	—	—	—	—	—	—	—	—	—
2008	3	86	Steve Quailer	United States	RW	—	—	—	—	—	—	—	—	—	—
2008	4	116	Jason Missiaen	Canada	G	—	—	—	—	—	—	—	—	—	—
2008	5	138	Maxim Trunev	Russia	RW	—	—	—	—	—	—	—	—	—	—
2008	7	206	Patrick Johnson	United States	F	—	—	—	—	—	—	—	—	—	—
2009	1	18	Louis Leblanc	Canada	C	50	5	5	10	32	—	—	—	—	—
2009	3	65	Joonas Nattinen	Finland	C	1	0	0	0	0	—	—	—	—	—
2009	3	79	Mac Bennett	United States	D	—	—	—	—	—	—	—	—	—	—
2009	4	109	Alexander Avtsin	Russia	RW	—	—	—	—	—	—	—	—	—	—
2009	5	139	Gabriel Dumont	Canada	C	90	4	5	9	48	—	—	—	—	—
2009	6	169	Dustin Walsh	Canada	C	—	—	—	—	—	—	—	—	—	—
2009	7	199	Michael Cichy	United States	C	—	—	—	—	—	—	—	—	—	—
2009	7	211	Petteri Simila	Finland	G	—	—	—	—	—	—	—	—	—	—
2010	1	22	Jarred Tinordi	United States	D	205	4	26	30	234	—	—	—	—	—
2010	4	113	Mark MacMillan	Canada	C	—	—	—	—	—	—	—	—	—	—
2010	4	117	Morgan Ellis	Canada	D	3	0	0	0	2	—	—	—	—	—
2010	5	147	Brendan Gallagher	Canada	RW	911	246	241	487	594	—	—	—	—	—
2010	7	207	John Westin	Sweden	W	—	—	—	—	—	—	—	—	—	—
2011	1	17	Nathan Beaulieu	Canada	D	471	12	86	98	340	—	—	—	—	—
2011	4	97	Josiah Didier	United States	D	—	—	—	—	—	—	—	—	—	—
2011	4	108	Olivier Archambault	Canada	LW	—	—	—	—	—	—	—	—	—	—
2011	4	113	Magnus Nygren	Sweden	D	—	—	—	—	—	—	—	—	—	—
2011	5	138	Darren Dietz	Canada	D	13	1	4	5	3	—	—	—	—	—
2011	6	168	Daniel Pribyl	Czech Republic	C	—	—	—	—	—	—	—	—	—	—
2011	7	198	Colin Sullivan	United States	D	—	—	—	—	—	—	—	—	—	—
2012	1	3	Alex Galchenyuk	United States	C	654	146	208	354	257	—	—	—	—	—
2012	2	33	Sebastian Collberg	Sweden	W	—	—	—	—	—	—	—	—	—	—
2012	2	51	Dalton Thrower	Canada	D	—	—	—	—	—	—	—	—	—	—
2012	3	64	Tim Bozon	France	LW	—	—	—	—	—	—	—	—	—	—
2012	4	94	Brady Vail	United States	C	—	—	—	—	—	—	—	—	—	—
2012	5	122	Charles Hudon	Canada	C	134	14	27	41	58	—	—	—	—	—
2012	6	154	Erik Nystrom	Sweden	W	—	—	—	—	—	—	—	—	—	—
2013	1	25	Michael McCarron	United States	RW	381	36	43	79	515	—	—	—	—	—
2013	2	34	Jacob de la Rose	Sweden	C	242	13	25	38	84	—	—	—	—	—
2013	2	36	Zachary Fucale	Canada	G	4	0	0	0	0	1	1	—	1	1.74
2013	2	55	Artturi Lehkonen	Finland	W	660	165	171	336	204	—	—	—	—	—
2013	3	71	Connor Crisp	Canada	C	—	—	—	—	—	—	—	—	—	—
2013	3	86	Sven Andrighetto	Switzerland	W	216	31	52	83	42	—	—	—	—	—
2013	4	116	Martin Reway	Slovakia	C	—	—	—	—	—	—	—	—	—	—
2013	6	176	Jeremy Gregoire	Canada	C	—	—	—	—	—	—	—	—	—	—
2014	1	26	Nikita Scherbak	Russia	RW	37	6	2	8	10	—	—	—	—	—
2014	3	73	Brett Lernout	Canada	D	21	0	1	1	6	—	—	—	—	—
2014	5	125	Nikolas Koberstein	Canada	D	—	—	—	—	—	—	—	—	—	—
2014	5	147	Daniel Audette	Canada	C	—	—	—	—	—	—	—	—	—	—
2014	6	177	Hayden Hawkey	United States	G	—	—	—	—	—	—	—	—	—	—
2014	7	207	Jake Evans	Canada	C	418	52	100	152	141	—	—	—	—	—
2015	1	26	Noah Juulsen	Canada	D	209	4	23	27	74	—	—	—	—	—
2015	3	87	Lukas Vejdemo	Sweden	C	13	2	0	2	0	—	—	—	—	—
2015	5	131	Matthew Bradley	Canada	C	—	—	—	—	—	—	—	—	—	—
2015	6	177	Simon Bourque	Canada	D	—	—	—	—	—	—	—	—	—	—
2015	7	207	Jeremiah Addison	Canada	LW	—	—	—	—	—	—	—	—	—	—
2016	1	9	Mikhail Sergachev	Russia	D	630	73	296	369	358	—	—	—	—	—
2016	3	70	William Bitten	Canada	C	4	0	1	1	0	—	—	—	—	—
2016	4	100	Victor Mete	Canada	D	248	5	40	45	46	—	—	—	—	—
2016	5	124	Casey Staum	United States	D	—	—	—	—	—	—	—	—	—	—
2016	6	160	Michael Pezzetta	Canada	C	209	15	23	38	276	—	—	—	—	—
2016	7	187	Arvid Henrikson	Sweden	D	—	—	—	—	—	—	—	—	—	—
2017	1	25	Ryan Poehling	United States	C	358	54	77	131	52	—	—	—	—	—
2017	2	56	Josh Brook	Canada	D	—	—	—	—	—	—	—	—	—	—
2017	2	58	Joni Ikonen	Finland	C	—	—	—	—	—	—	—	—	—	—
2017	3	68	Scott Walford	Canada	D	—	—	—	—	—	—	—	—	—	—
2017	3	87	Cale Fleury	Canada	D	100	2	4	6	15	—	—	—	—	—
2017	5	149	Jarret Tyszka	Canada	D	—	—	—	—	—	—	—	—	—	—
2017	7	199	Cayden Primeau	United States	G	58	0	2	2	4	15	25	—	7	3.73
2018	1	3	Jesperi Kotkaniemi	Finland	C	518	78	125	203	242	—	—	—	—	—
2018	2	35	Jesse Ylonen	Finland	RW	111	12	17	29	14	—	—	—	—	—
2018	2	38	Alexander Romanov	Russia	D	369	17	67	84	163	—	—	—	—	—
2018	2	56	Jacob Olofsson	Sweden	C	—	—	—	—	—	—	—	—	—	—
2018	3	66	Cam Hillis	Canada	C	1	0	0	0	0	—	—	—	—	—
2018	3	71	Jordan Harris	United States	D	172	10	30	40	62	—	—	—	—	—
2018	4	97	Allan McShane	Canada	C	—	—	—	—	—	—	—	—	—	—
2018	4	123	Jack Gorniak	United States	LW	—	—	—	—	—	—	—	—	—	—
2018	5	128	Cole Fonstad	Canada	C	—	—	—	—	—	—	—	—	—	—
2018	5	133	Samuel Houde	Canada	C	—	—	—	—	—	—	—	—	—	—
2018	7	190	Brett Stapley	Canada	C	—	—	—	—	—	—	—	—	—	—
2019	1	15	Cole Caufield	United States	RW	368	169	138	307	58	—	—	—	—	—
2019	2	46	Jayden Struble	United States	D	171	7	28	35	167	—	—	—	—	—
2019	3	64	Mattias Norlinder	Sweden	D	6	0	1	1	2	—	—	—	—	—
2019	3	77	Gianni Fairbrother	Canada	D	—	—	—	—	—	—	—	—	—	—
2019	5	126	Jacob LeGuerrier	Canada	D	—	—	—	—	—	—	—	—	—	—
2019	5	131	Rhett Pitlick	United States	LW	—	—	—	—	—	—	—	—	—	—
2019	5	138	Frederik Nissen Dichow	Denmark	G	—	—	—	—	—	—	—	—	—	—
2019	6	170	Arsen Khisamutdinov	Russia	C	—	—	—	—	—	—	—	—	—	—
2019	7	201	Rafael Harvey-Pinard	Canada	LW	85	17	14	31	16	—	—	—	—	—
2019	7	206	Kieran Ruscheinski	Canada	D	—	—	—	—	—	—	—	—	—	—
2020	1	16	Kaiden Guhle	Canada	D	208	18	51	69	171	—	—	—	—	—
2020	2	47	Luke Tuch	United States	LW	—	—	—	—	—	—	—	—	—	—
2020	2	48	Jan Mysak	Czech Republic	C	—	—	—	—	—	—	—	—	—	—
2020	4	102	Jack Smith	United States	C	—	—	—	—	—	—	—	—	—	—
2020	4	109	Blake Biondi	United States	C	—	—	—	—	—	—	—	—	—	—
2020	4	124	Sean Farrell	United States	LW	6	1	0	1	0	—	—	—	—	—
2020	5	136	Jakub Dobes	Czech Republic	G	59	0	0	0	2	36	14	—	7	2.77
2020	6	171	Alexander Gordin	Russia	RW	—	—	—	—	—	—	—	—	—	—
2021	1	31	Logan Mailloux	Canada	D	75	7	11	18	54	—	—	—	—	—
2021	2	63	Riley Kidney	Canada	C	—	—	—	—	—	—	—	—	—	—
2021	2	64	Oliver Kapanen	Finland	C	100	22	17	39	24	—	—	—	—	—
2021	3	87	Dmitri Kostenko	Russia	D	—	—	—	—	—	—	—	—	—	—
2021	4	113	William Trudeau	Canada	D	—	—	—	—	—	—	—	—	—	—
2021	5	142	Daniil Sobolev	Russia	D	—	—	—	—	—	—	—	—	—	—
2021	5	150	Joshua Roy	Canada	RW	38	6	5	11	4	—	—	—	—	—
2021	6	191	Xavier Simoneau	Canada	C	—	—	—	—	—	—	—	—	—	—
2021	7	214	Joe Vrbetic	Canada	G	—	—	—	—	—	—	—	—	—	—
2022	1	1	Juraj Slafkovsky	Slovakia	LW	282	72	112	184	185	—	—	—	—	—
2022	1	26	Filip Mesar	Slovakia	LW	—	—	—	—	—	—	—	—	—	—
2022	2	33	Owen Beck	Canada	C	28	1	1	2	6	—	—	—	—	—
2022	2	62	Lane Hutson	United States	D	166	18	128	146	68	—	—	—	—	—
2022	3	75	Vinzenz Rohrer	Austria	C	—	—	—	—	—	—	—	—	—	—
2022	3	92	Adam Engstrom	Sweden	D	15	0	1	1	8	—	—	—	—	—
2022	4	127	Cedrick Guindon	Canada	C	—	—	—	—	—	—	—	—	—	—
2022	5	130	Jared Davidson	Canada	C	10	0	1	1	10	—	—	—	—	—
2022	6	162	Emmett Croteau	Canada	G	—	—	—	—	—	—	—	—	—	—
2022	7	194	Petteri Nurmi	Finland	D	—	—	—	—	—	—	—	—	—	—
2022	7	216	Miguel Tourigny	Canada	D	—	—	—	—	—	—	—	—	—	—
2023	1	5	David Reinbacher	Austria	D	2	0	1	1	0	—	—	—	—	—
2023	3	69	Jacob Fowler	United States	G	17	0	0	0	0	9	6	2	.908	2.43
2023	4	101	Florian Xhekaj	Canada	LW	5	0	1	1	7	—	—	—	—	—
2023	4	110	Bogdan Konyushkov	Russia	D	—	—	—	—	—	—	—	—	—	—
2023	4	128	Quentin Miller	Canada	G	—	—	—	—	—	—	—	—	—	—
2023	5	133	Sam Harris	United States	LW	—	—	—	—	—	—	—	—	—	—
2023	5	144	Evgenii Volokhin	Russia	G	—	—	—	—	—	—	—	—	—	—
2023	6	165	Filip Eriksson	Sweden	C	—	—	—	—	—	—	—	—	—	—
2023	7	197	Luke Mittelstadt	United States	D	—	—	—	—	—	—	—	—	—	—
2024	1	5	Ivan Demidov	Russia	RW	84	20	44	64	34	—	—	—	—	—
2024	1	21	Michael Hage	Canada	C	—	—	—	—	—	—	—	—	—	—
2024	3	70	Aatos Koivu	Finland	C	—	—	—	—	—	—	—	—	—	—
2024	3	78	Logan Sawyer	Canada	C	—	—	—	—	—	—	—	—	—	—
2024	4	102	Owen Protz	Canada	D	—	—	—	—	—	—	—	—	—	—
2024	5	130	Tyler Thorpe	Canada	RW	—	—	—	—	—	—	—	—	—	—
2024	5	134	Mikus Vecvanags	Latvia	G	—	—	—	—	—	—	—	—	—	—
2024	6	166	Ben Merrill	United States	C	—	—	—	—	—	—	—	—	—	—
2024	7	210	Makar Khanin	Russia	RW	—	—	—	—	—	—	—	—	—	—
2024	7	224	Rasmus Bergqvist	Sweden	D	—	—	—	—	—	—	—	—	—	—
2025	2	34	Alexander Zharovsky	Russia	RW	—	—	—	—	—	—	—	—	—	—
2025	3	69	Hayden Paupanekis	Canada	C	—	—	—	—	—	—	—	—	—	—
2025	3	81	Bryce Pickford	Canada	D	—	—	—	—	—	—	—	—	—	—
2025	3	82	Arseni Radkov	Belarus	G	—	—	—	—	—	—	—	—	—	—
2025	4	113	John Mooney	United States	C	—	—	—	—	—	—	—	—	—	—
2025	5	145	Alexis Cournoyer	Canada	G	—	—	—	—	—	—	—	—	—	—
2025	6	177	Carlos Händel	Germany	D	—	—	—	—	—	—	—	—	—	—
2025	6	189	Andrew MacNiel	Canada	D	—	—	—	—	—	—	—	—	—	—
2025	7	209	Max Vig	United States	D	—	—	—	—	—	—	—	—	—	—
2026	1	26	Gleb Pugachyov	Russia	RW	—	—	—	—	—	—	—	—	—	—
2026	2	57	Timofei Runtso	United States	D	—	—	—	—	—	—	—	—	—	—
2026	3	93	Cooper Cleaves	United States	D	—	—	—	—	—	—	—	—	—	—
2026	4	117	Brayden Klimpke	Canada	D	—	—	—	—	—	—	—	—	—	—
2026	6	189	Parker Trottier	United States	LW	—	—	—	—	—	—	—	—	—	—
2026	6	190	Wesley Royston	Canada	RW	—	—	—	—	—	—	—	—	—	—
2026	7	221	Jean-Samuel Daigneault	Canada	D	—	—	—	—	—	—	—	—	—	—
2026	7	224	Tyler Deakos	Canada	RW	—	—	—	—	—	—	—	—	—	—

== See also ==
- List of Montreal Canadiens players
