= Bruce Baker (ice hockey) =

Canadian ice hockey player (born 1956)

- Born: April 25, 1956 (age 69) Ottawa, Ontario, Canada
- Height: 6 ft 0 in (183 cm)
- Weight: 185 lb (84 kg; 13 st 3 lb)
- Position: Right Wing
- Played for: Nova Scotia Voyageurs (AHL)
- NHL draft: 18th overall, 1976; Montreal Canadiens
- WHA draft: 55th overall, 1976; Calgary Cowboys
- Playing career: 1976–1981

Bruce Keith Baker (born April 25, 1956, in Ottawa, Ontario) is a Canadian former professional ice hockey right winger.

== Playing career ==
Baker was drafted in the first round, 18th overall, by the Montreal Canadiens in the 1976 NHL Amateur Draft. He was also drafted by the Calgary Cowboys of the World Hockey Association. He never played in the National Hockey League or the WHA, however. He spent his entire five-year professional career in the American Hockey League with the Nova Scotia Voyageurs.

== Personal life ==
He lives in Kanata, Ontario with his wife, Kellie.

Preceded by Rod Schutt	Montreal Canadiens first-round draft pick 1976	Succeeded by Mark Napier
