= Gleb Pugachyov =

Russian ice hockey player (born 2008)

- Born: 25 March 2008 (age 18) Almaty, Kazakhstan
- Height: 6 ft 3 in (191 cm)
- Weight: 225 lb (102 kg; 16 st 1 lb)
- Position: Right wing
- Shoots: Left
- KHL team: Torpedo Nizhny Novgorod
- NHL draft: 26th overall, 2026; Montreal Canadiens
- Playing career: 2025–present

Gleb Romanovich Pugachyov (Russian: Глеб Романович Пугачёв; born 25 March 2008) is a Russian-Kazakh professional ice hockey player who is a right winger for Torpedo Nizhny Novgorod of the Kontinental Hockey League (KHL). He was selected in the first round, 26th overall, by the Montreal Canadiens in the 2026 NHL entry draft.

== Playing career ==
=== Russia ===
On 6 January 2026, Pugachyov made his professional debut at age 17 for Torpedo Nizhny Novgorod of the Kontinental Hockey League (KHL) amidst the 2025–26 season. Over the course of his rookie campaign, he registered two goals and one assist in 13 games played. He also contributed one goal and four assists in 15 games with Torpedo-Gorky Nizhny Novgorod of the All-Russian Hockey League (VHL), the country's second-highest professional league. Pugachyov likewise appeared in 33 games with Chaika Nizhny Novgorod of the Junior Hockey League (MHL) ranks, recording 24 points and was named as a league All-Star.

Ranked as the ninth-best European skater prior to the 2026 NHL entry draft by the National Hockey League (NHL) Central Scouting Bureau, he was ultimately selected in the first round (26th overall) by the Montreal Canadiens.

== Career statistics ==
			Regular season					Playoffs
Season	Team	League	GP	G	A	Pts	PIM	GP	G	A	Pts	PIM
2024–25	Chaika Nizhny Novgorod	MHL	42	5	12	17	84	14	5	6	11	8
2025–26	Torpedo-Gorky	VHL	15	1	4	5	11	—	—	—	—	—
2025–26	Chaika Nizhny Novgorod	MHL	33	10	14	24	36	16	3	6	9	23
2025–26	Torpedo Nizhny Novgorod	KHL	13	2	1	3	8	—	—	—	—	—
KHL totals			13	2	1	3	8	—	—	—	—	—

== Awards and honours ==
Award	Year	Ref
MHL
All-Star Game	2026	

Awards and achievements
Preceded by Michael Hage	Montreal Canadiens first-round draft pick 2026	Succeeded by Incumbent
