= Noah Juulsen =

Canadian ice hockey player (born 1997)

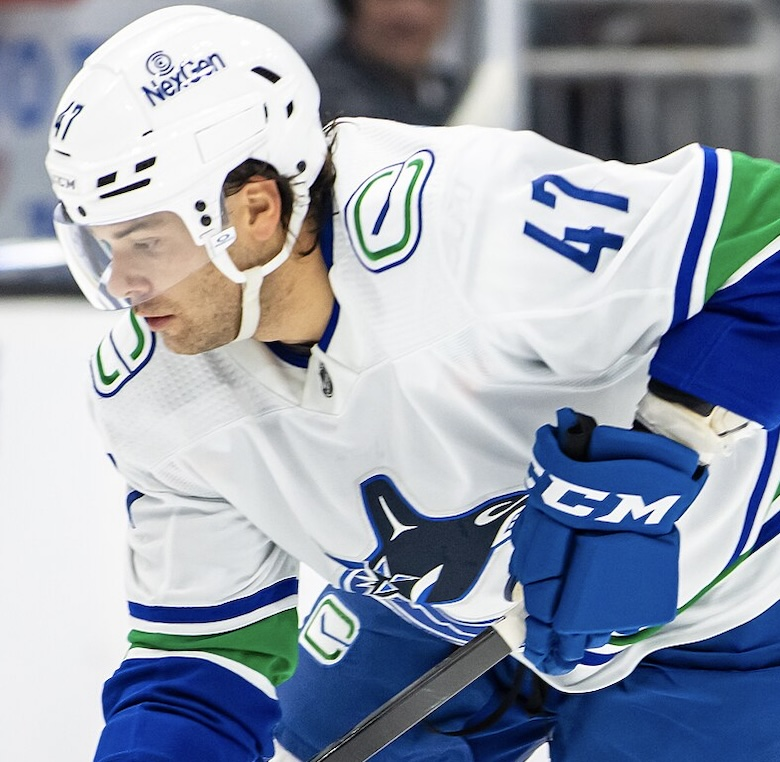
- Juulsen with the Vancouver Canucks in 2023
- Born: April 2, 1997 (age 29) Surrey, British Columbia, Canada
- Height: 6 ft 2 in (188 cm)
- Weight: 201 lb (91 kg; 14 st 5 lb)
- Position: Defence
- Shoots: Right
- NHL team Former teams: Colorado Avalanche; Montreal Canadiens; Florida Panthers; Vancouver Canucks; Philadelphia Flyers
- NHL draft: 26th overall, 2015; Montreal Canadiens
- Playing career: 2017–present

Noah Juulsen (born April 2, 1997) is a Canadian professional ice hockey player who is a defenceman for the Colorado Avalanche of the National Hockey League (NHL). He was selected in the first round, 26th overall, by the Montreal Canadiens in the 2015 NHL entry draft. Juulsen has also previously played for the Florida Panthers, Vancouver Canucks and Philadelphia Flyers.

== Playing career ==
=== Junior ===
Juulsen was drafted by the Everett Silvertips in the fourth round of the 2012 Western Hockey League (WHL) Bantam Draft. During the 2014–15 WHL season his outstanding play was rewarded when he was selected to play in the 2015 CHL/NHL Top Prospects Game. During the 2015 NHL entry draft, the Montreal Canadiens selected Juulsen 26th overall. On July 9, 2015, Juulsen agreed to terms on a three-year, entry- level contract with the Canadiens.

=== Professional ===
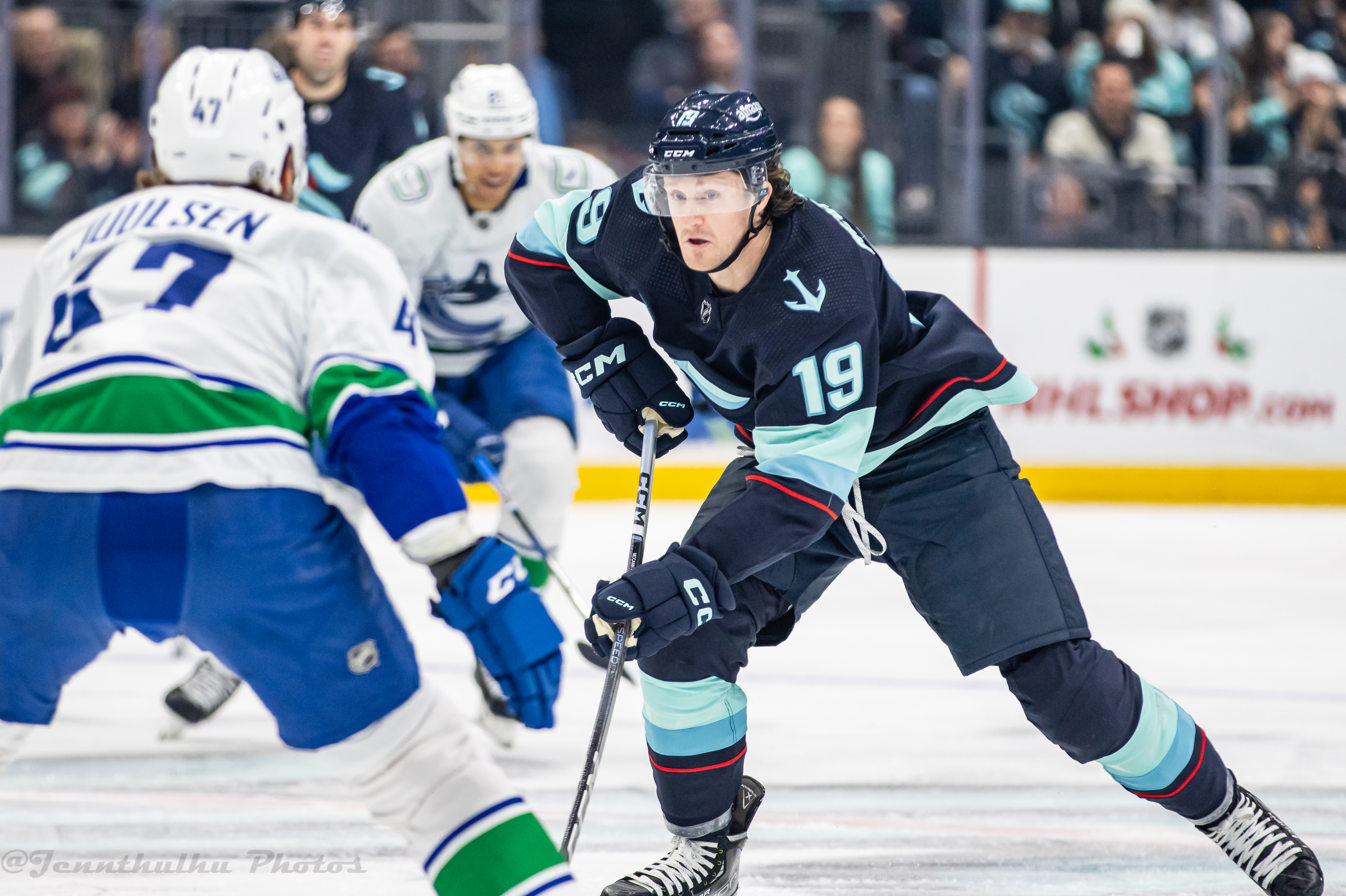
Juulsen (left) defending against the Seattle Kraken in November 2023.

Juulsen made his professional debut during the 2017–18 NHL Season. On February 21, 2018, Juulsen was recalled by the Canadiens and played his first NHL game on February 22, 2018, in a 3–1 win against the New York Rangers. On March 2, Juulsen scored his first career NHL goal during a 6–3 win over the New York Islanders. He recorded an additional two assists in 23 total games for the club.

On February 1, 2019, the Canadiens announced Juulsen was out indefinitely with a vision-related issue following twin puck strikes to the face during the November 19, 2018 match against the Washington Capitals. He skated in a total of 21 games for the Canadiens during the 2018–19 season, scoring one goal and four assists.

On January 11, 2021, the Florida Panthers claimed Juulsen off of waivers from the Canadiens.

Prior to the commencement of the 2021–22 season, on October 10, 2021, Juulsen was traded by the Panthers to the Vancouver Canucks, along with Juho Lammikko, in exchange for Olli Juolevi.

Juulsen signed a one-year, $900,000 contract with the Philadelphia Flyers for the 2025–26 season on July 1, 2025.

He signed a two-year contract with the Colorado Avalanche on July 1, 2026.

== International play ==
Medal record

Representing Canada

Ice hockey

World Junior Championships
Silver medal – second place	2017 Canada	

Juulsen competed with Team Canada Pacific to win a silver medal at the 2014 World U-17 Hockey Challenge.

== Career statistics ==
=== Regular season and playoffs ===
			Regular season					Playoffs
Season	Team	League	GP	G	A	Pts	PIM	GP	G	A	Pts	PIM
2012–13	Fraser Valley Thunderbirds	BCMML	35	6	19	25	24	—	—	—	—	—
2012–13	Everett Silvertips	WHL	1	0	0	0	0	—	—	—	—	—
2013–14	Everett Silvertips	WHL	59	2	8	10	32	3	0	0	0	2
2014–15	Everett Silvertips	WHL	68	9	43	52	42	6	0	1	1	8
2015–16	Everett Silvertips	WHL	63	7	21	28	37	6	0	2	2	10
2016–17	Everett Silvertips	WHL	49	12	22	34	38	10	0	2	2	10
2016–17	St. John's IceCaps	AHL	—	—	—	—	—	2	0	0	0	0
2017–18	Laval Rocket	AHL	31	1	5	6	8	—	—	—	—	—
2017–18	Montreal Canadiens	NHL	23	1	2	3	4	—	—	—	—	—
2018–19	Montreal Canadiens	NHL	21	1	4	5	6	—	—	—	—	—
2018–19	Laval Rocket	AHL	3	0	0	0	0	—	—	—	—	—
2019–20	Laval Rocket	AHL	13	0	3	3	4	—	—	—	—	—
2020–21	Florida Panthers	NHL	4	0	0	0	0	—	—	—	—	—
2020–21	Syracuse Crunch	AHL	5	0	1	1	2	—	—	—	—	—
2021–22	Abbotsford Canucks	AHL	50	3	13	16	63	2	0	0	0	4
2021–22	Vancouver Canucks	NHL	8	0	2	2	0	—	—	—	—	—
2022–23	Vancouver Canucks	NHL	12	0	0	0	6	—	—	—	—	—
2022–23	Abbotsford Canucks	AHL	49	3	17	20	34	5	0	2	2	4
2023–24	Vancouver Canucks	NHL	54	1	6	7	22	2	0	0	0	4
2024–25	Vancouver Canucks	NHL	35	0	0	0	21	—	—	—	—	—
2025–26	Philadelphia Flyers	NHL	52	1	9	10	15	5	0	2	2	0
NHL totals			209	4	23	27	74	7	0	2	2	4

=== International ===
Year	Team	Event	Result	GP	G	A	Pts	PIM
2014	Canada Pacific	U17	2nd place, silver medalist(s)	6	1	1	2	2
2017	Canada	WJC	2nd place, silver medalist(s)	7	0	2	2	4
Junior totals				13	1	3	4	6

== Awards and honours ==
Honours	Year
CHL/NHL Top Prospects Game	2015

Awards and achievements
Preceded by Nikita Scherbak	Montreal Canadiens first-round draft pick 2015	Succeeded by Mikhail Sergachev
