= Gilbert Delorme =

Canadian ice hockey player (born 1962)

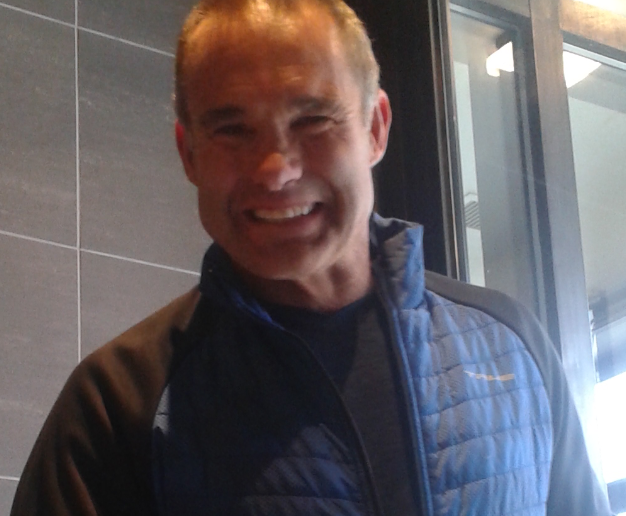
- Gilbert Delorme, photographed outside of the Montréal-based radio station he works at
- Born: November 25, 1962 (age 63) Boucherville, Quebec, Canada
- Height: 6 ft 0 in (183 cm)
- Weight: 203 lb (92 kg; 14 st 7 lb)
- Position: Defence
- Shot: Right
- Played for: Montreal Canadiens; St. Louis Blues; Detroit Red Wings; Quebec Nordiques; Pittsburgh Penguins
- NHL draft: 18th overall, 1981; Montreal Canadiens
- Playing career: 1981–1995

Gilbert Delorme (born November 25, 1962) is a Canadian former professional ice hockey player who was a defenceman for five NHL teams. He played for the Montreal Canadiens, St. Louis Blues, Quebec Nordiques, Detroit Red Wings and Pittsburgh Penguins. Delorme was born in Boucherville, Quebec.

Delorme was selected by Montreal in the 1981 NHL entry draft in the first round (18th overall). He spent nine seasons in the NHL.

He missed the entire 1990–91 season recovering from a broken leg suffered in an auto accident during training in the summer of 1990. Pittsburgh won the Cup in 1991, but Delorme was left off the Cup for missing the whole season

Delorme retired following the 1991–92 season in the minors. He then briefly held a front office position with the Penguins before attempting a comeback in the IHL. He spent three seasons in the IHL as an assistant coach, split between the Cleveland Lumberjacks and Manitoba Moose. He also spent two seasons with the Montreal Rocket of the Quebec Major Junior Hockey League before serving as head coach for one season.

He and his wife now own a Tim Hortons franchise in Saint-Basile-le-Grand, Quebec, on Montreal's south shore.

== Awards and achievements ==
- QMJHL Second All-Star Team (1981)

== Career statistics ==
=== Regular season and playoffs ===
			Regular season					Playoffs
Season	Team	League	GP	G	A	Pts	PIM	GP	G	A	Pts	PIM
1977–78	Richelieu Canotiers	QMAAA	40	7	25	32	32	7	1	4	5	35
1978–79	Chicoutimi Saguenéens	QMJHL	72	13	47	60	53	4	0	3	3	0
1979–80	Chicoutimi Saguenéens	QMJHL	71	25	86	111	68	12	2	10	12	26
1980–81	Chicoutimi Saguenéens	QMJHL	70	27	79	106	77	12	10	12	22	16
1981–82	Montreal Canadiens	NHL	60	3	8	11	55	—	—	—	—	—
1982–83	Montreal Canadiens	NHL	78	12	21	33	89	3	0	0	0	2
1983–84	Montreal Canadiens	NHL	27	2	7	9	8	—	—	—	—	—
1983–84	St. Louis Blues	NHL	44	0	5	5	41	11	1	3	4	11
1984–85	St. Louis Blues	NHL	74	2	12	14	53	3	0	0	0	0
1985–86	Quebec Nordiques	NHL	64	2	18	20	51	2	0	0	0	5
1986–87	Quebec Nordiques	NHL	19	2	0	2	14	—	—	—	—	—
1986–87	Detroit Red Wings	NHL	24	2	3	5	33	16	0	2	2	14
1987–88	Detroit Red Wings	NHL	55	2	8	10	81	15	0	3	3	22
1988–89	Detroit Red Wings	NHL	42	1	3	4	51	6	0	1	1	2
1989–90	Pittsburgh Penguins	NHL	54	3	7	10	44	—	—	—	—	—
1991–92	Muskegon Lumberjacks	IHL	60	6	6	12	89	7	2	2	4	12
1994–95	Kalamazoo Wings	IHL	28	1	5	6	26	—	—	—	—	—
NHL totals			541	31	92	123	520	56	1	9	10	56

=== International ===
Year	Team	Event	GP	G	A	Pts	PIM
1981	Canada	WJC	5	1	0	1	0

Preceded by Mark Hunter	Montreal Canadiens first-round draft pick 1981	Succeeded by Jan Ingman
