= Rod Schutt =

Canadian ice hockey player

- Born: October 13, 1956 (age 69) Sudbury, Ontario, Canada
- Height: 5 ft 10 in (178 cm)
- Weight: 185 lb (84 kg; 13 st 3 lb)
- Position: Left wing
- Shot: Left
- Played for: Montreal Canadiens; Pittsburgh Penguins; Toronto Maple Leafs
- NHL draft: 13th overall, 1976; Montreal Canadiens
- WHA draft: 14th overall, 1976; Cleveland Crusaders
- Playing career: 1976–1986

Rodney Gordon Schutt (born October 13, 1956) is a Canadian former professional ice hockey player who played 286 games in the National Hockey League. He played with the Toronto Maple Leafs, Montreal Canadiens, and Pittsburgh Penguins.

== Career statistics ==
			Regular season					Playoffs
Season	Team	League	GP	G	A	Pts	PIM	GP	G	A	Pts	PIM
1972–73	Pembroke Lumber Kings	CJHL	55	31	55	81	61	—	—	—	—	—
1973–74	Sudbury Wolves	OHA-Jr.	67	15	41	56	47	4	0	0	0	2
1974–75	Sudbury Wolves	OMJHL	69	43	61	104	66	15	13	9	22	2
1975–76	Sudbury Wolves	OMJHL	63	72	63	135	42	17	18	16	34	13
1976–77	Nova Scotia Voyageurs	AHL	80	33	51	84	56	12	8	8	16	4
1977–78	Montreal Canadiens	NHL	2	0	0	0	0	—	—	—	—	—
1977–78	Nova Scotia Voyageurs	AHL	77	36	44	80	57	11	4	7	11	2
1978–79	Pittsburgh Penguins	NHL	74	24	21	45	33	7	2	0	2	4
1979–80	Pittsburgh Penguins	NHL	73	18	21	39	43	5	2	1	3	6
1980–81	Pittsburgh Penguins	NHL	80	25	35	60	55	5	3	3	6	16
1981–82	Pittsburgh Penguins	NHL	35	9	12	21	42	5	1	2	3	0
1981–82	Erie Blades	AHL	35	12	15	27	40	—	—	—	—	—
1982–83	Pittsburgh Penguins	NHL	5	0	0	0	0	—	—	—	—	—
1982–83	Baltimore Skipjacks	AHL	64	34	53	87	24	—	—	—	—	—
1983–84	Pittsburgh Penguins	NHL	11	1	3	4	4	—	—	—	—	—
1983–84	Baltimore Skipjacks	AHL	36	15	19	34	48	10	3	1	4	22
1984–85	Muskegon Lumberjacks	IHL	79	44	46	90	58	17	10	13	23	10
1985–86	Toronto Maple Leafs	NHL	6	0	0	0	0	—	—	—	—	—
1985–86	St. Catharines Saints	AHL	70	21	28	49	44	13	7	4	11	18
NHL totals			286	77	92	169	177	22	8	6	14	26

Preceded by Peter Lee	Montreal Canadiens first-round draft pick 1976	Succeeded by Bruce Baker
