= José Charbonneau =

Canadian ice hockey player (born 1966)

- Born: November 2, 1966 (age 59) Ferme-Neuve, Quebec, Canada
- Height: 6 ft 0 in (183 cm)
- Weight: 195 lb (88 kg; 13 st 13 lb)
- Position: Right wing
- Shot: Right
- Played for: Montreal Canadiens; Vancouver Canucks
- National team: Canada
- NHL draft: 12th overall, 1985; Montreal Canadiens
- Playing career: 1986–2001

Jose Pierre Charbonneau (born November 2, 1966) is a Canadian former professional ice hockey player who spent parts of 4 seasons in the National Hockey League between 1987 and 1995.

== Playing career ==
A scoring winger who also possessed a gritty element to his game, Charbonneau was selected 12th overall in the 1985 NHL entry draft by the Montreal Canadiens. As a Francophone drafted with such a high pick by Montreal expectations were very high. He turned pro in 1986, but experienced a difficult first pro season, scoring just 14 goals for Montreal's American Hockey League (AHL) affiliate in Sherbrooke. He rebounded the next year to score 30 goals for Sherbrooke and received his first NHL action for the Canadiens, although he registered just 2 assists in 16 games. He played 9 more games for Montreal in 1988–89 and scored his first NHL goal, but was traded to the Vancouver Canucks mid-season. In 13 games for the Canucks, he continued to struggle, recording just a single assist.

Charbonneau spent one more season in the Canuck organization, but failed to see any more NHL action and was released by the club in 1990, having produced just 1 goal and 7 points in 38 NHL games. Following his release, he spent the 1990–91 season with the Canadian National Team and had brief stints over the next two seasons in Germany, Switzerland, and Holland. By the summer of 1993, he was playing roller hockey for the Vancouver Voodoo.

Charbonneau's performance with the Voodoo impressed the team's GM, ex-NHL star Tiger Williams, who convinced the Canucks to give him another chance. He was given an invite to the club's 1993 training camp and shocked everyone by making the team. Charbonneau was playing and scoring regularly for the first two months of the season, until back and knee injuries struck and caused him to miss 4 months of action. He returned late in the season but struggled to get back his regular lineup spot. He finished the season with 7 goals and 14 points in 30 games. He was also a member of the Canuck team which went to the Stanley Cup Finals in 1994, playing in 3 playoff games and scoring a goal.

Charbonneau started the 1994–95 season with the Canucks, but played only 3 games before being loaned to Las Vegas of the IHL. Unable to get another NHL contract, he signed in Germany, where he enjoyed 6 productive and successful seasons in the DEL before retiring from the game in 2001.

He finished his career with 9 goals and 22 points in 71 career NHL games, along with 67 penalty minutes.

== Career statistics ==
| | | | Regular season | | | | | Playoffs |
| Season | Team | League | GP | G | A | Pts | PIM | GP | G | A | Pts | PIM |
|---|---|---|---|---|---|---|---|---|---|---|---|---|
| 1981–82 | Laval Insulaires | QMAAA | 42 | 15 | 31 | 46 | 61 | — | — | — | — | — |
| 1982–83 | Laval Insulaires | QMAAA | 48 | 40 | 50 | 90 | 56 | — | — | — | — | — |
| 1983–84 | Drummondville Voltigeurs | QMJHL | 65 | 31 | 59 | 90 | 110 | 10 | 5 | 5 | 10 | 9 |
| 1984–85 | Drummondville Voltigeurs | QMJHL | 46 | 34 | 40 | 74 | 91 | 12 | 5 | 10 | 15 | 20 |
| 1985–86 | Drummondvile Voltigeurs | QMJHL | 57 | 44 | 45 | 89 | 158 | 23 | 16 | 20 | 36 | 40 |
| 1986–87 | Sherbrooke Canadiens | AHL | 72 | 14 | 27 | 41 | 94 | 16 | 5 | 12 | 17 | 17 |
| 1987–88 | Montreal Canadiens | NHL | 16 | 0 | 2 | 2 | 6 | 8 | 0 | 0 | 0 | 4 |
| 1987–88 | Sherbrooke Canadiens | AHL | 55 | 30 | 35 | 65 | 108 | — | — | — | — | — |
| 1988–89 | Sherbrooke Canadiens | AHL | 33 | 13 | 15 | 28 | 95 | — | — | — | — | — |
| 1988–89 | Milwaukee Admirals | IHL | 13 | 8 | 5 | 13 | 46 | 10 | 3 | 2 | 5 | 23 |
| 1988–89 | Montreal Canadiens | NHL | 9 | 1 | 3 | 4 | 6 | — | — | — | — | — |
| 1988–89 | Vancouver Canucks | NHL | 13 | 0 | 1 | 1 | 6 | — | — | — | — | — |
| 1989–90 | Milwaukee Admirals | IHL | 65 | 23 | 38 | 61 | 137 | 5 | 0 | 1 | 1 | 8 |
| 1990–91 | Canadian National Team | Intl | 56 | 22 | 29 | 51 | 54 | — | — | — | — | — |
| 1991–92 | EHC Dynamo Berlin | GER.2 | 11 | 3 | 6 | 9 | 16 | — | — | — | — | — |
| 1991–92 | SC Rapperswil–Jona | SUI.2 | 15 | 20 | 10 | 30 | 42 | — | — | — | — | — |
| 1992–93 | Eaters Geleen | NLD | 7 | 7 | 13 | 20 | — | 17 | 11 | 23 | 34 | — |
| 1992–93 | Canadian National Team | Intl | 1 | 0 | 0 | 0 | 0 | — | — | — | — | — |
| 1993–94 | Hamilton Canucks | AHL | 7 | 3 | 2 | 5 | 8 | — | — | — | — | — |
| 1993–94 | Vancouver Canucks | NHL | 30 | 7 | 7 | 14 | 49 | 3 | 1 | 0 | 1 | 4 |
| 1994–95 | Las Vegas Thunder | IHL | 27 | 8 | 12 | 20 | 102 | 9 | 1 | 1 | 2 | 71 |
| 1994–95 | Vancouver Canucks | NHL | 3 | 1 | 0 | 1 | 0 | — | — | — | — | — |
| 1995–96 | EV Landshut | DEL | 47 | 32 | 24 | 56 | 102 | 11 | 10 | 6 | 16 | 28 |
| 1996–97 | EV Landshut | DEL | 13 | 5 | 4 | 9 | 41 | — | — | — | — | — |
| 1996–97 | Wedemark Scorpions | DEL | 31 | 12 | 23 | 35 | 97 | 6 | 1 | 0 | 1 | 27 |
| 1997–98 | Frankfurt Lions | DEL | 40 | 13 | 16 | 29 | 156 | 7 | 4 | 1 | 5 | 18 |
| 1998–99 | Frankfurt Lions | DEL | 47 | 16 | 19 | 35 | 76 | 2 | 0 | 0 | 0 | 6 |
| 1999–2000 | Frankfurt Lions | DEL | 55 | 18 | 30 | 48 | 98 | 5 | 0 | 1 | 1 | 12 |
| 2000–01 | Frankfurt Lions | DEL | 58 | 19 | 25 | 44 | 85 | — | — | — | — | — |
| AHL totals | | | 167 | 60 | 79 | 139 | 305 | 16 | 5 | 12 | 17 | 17 |
| NHL totals | | | 71 | 9 | 13 | 22 | 67 | 11 | 1 | 0 | 1 | 8 |
| DEL totals | | | 291 | 115 | 141 | 256 | 655 | 31 | 15 | 8 | 23 | 91 |

| Preceded by Shayne Corson | Montreal Canadiens first-round draft pick 1985 | Succeeded by Tom Chorske |
