= Jan Ingman =

Swedish ice hockey player (born 1961)

- Born: November 25, 1961 (age 64) Grums, SWE
- Height: 6 ft 2 in (188 cm)
- Weight: 187 lb (85 kg; 13 st 5 lb)
- Position: Left wing
- Shot: Left
- Played for: Grums IK; Färjestads BK
- NHL draft: 19th overall, 1981; Montreal Canadiens
- Playing career: 1977–1992

Jan Ingman (born November 25, 1961, in Grums, Sweden) is a retired professional ice hockey player.

== Career ==
During his career, he played for Grums IK between 1977–1979 and 1991-1992 and for Färjestads BK between 1979-1991. He won three Swedish Championships with Färjestads, in 1981, 1986, and 1988 . He was drafted by the Montreal Canadiens in the 1981 NHL entry draft, as the 19th pick overall. Though picked in the first round in the draft, he never played for the Canadiens.

== Career statistics ==
=== Regular season and playoffs ===
			Regular season					Playoffs
Season	Team	League	GP	G	A	Pts	PIM	GP	G	A	Pts	PIM
1977–78	Grums IK	SWE.2	15	5	6	11	4	—	—	—	—	—
1978–79	Grums IK	SWE.2	27	15	4	19	8	—	—	—	—	—
1979–80	Färjestad BK	SWE U20
1980–81	Färjestad BK	SEL	30	13	7	20	12	7	5	0	5	13
1981–82	Färjestad BK	SEL	27	7	2	9	6	1	0	0	0	0
1982–83	Färjestad BK	SEL	30	13	11	24	20	8	5	0	5	8
1983–84	Färjestad BK	SEL	36	14	11	25	36	—	—	—	—	—
1984–85	Färjestad BK	SEL	35	19	18	37	14	3	0	0	0	2
1985–86	Färjestad BK	SEL	33	19	12	31	20	7	4	1	5	4
1986–87	Färjestad BK	SEL	28	11	9	20	14	—	—	—	—	—
1987–88	Färjestad BK	SEL	28	6	7	13	14	9	5	3	8	2
1988–89	Färjestad BK	SEL	33	15	17	32	24	2	1	1	2	4
1989–90	Färjestad BK	SEL	32	15	13	28	16	10	5	3	8	2
1990–91	Färjestad BK	SEL	27	3	2	5	14	6	0	0	0	0
1991–92	Grums IK	SWE.2	19	8	10	18	2	—	—	—	—	—
1992–93	IFK Munkfors	SWE.3	11	9	4	13	0	—	—	—	—	—
SEL totals			339	133	111	244	190	53	25	8	33	35

=== International ===
Year	Team	Event	GP	G	A	Pts	PIM
1979	Sweden	EJC	5	2	1	3
1981	Sweden	WJC	5	4	2	6	2

Preceded by Gilbert Delorme	Montreal Canadiens first-round draft pick 1981	Succeeded by Alain Héroux
