= Matt Higgins (ice hockey) =

Canadian ice hockey player (born 1977)

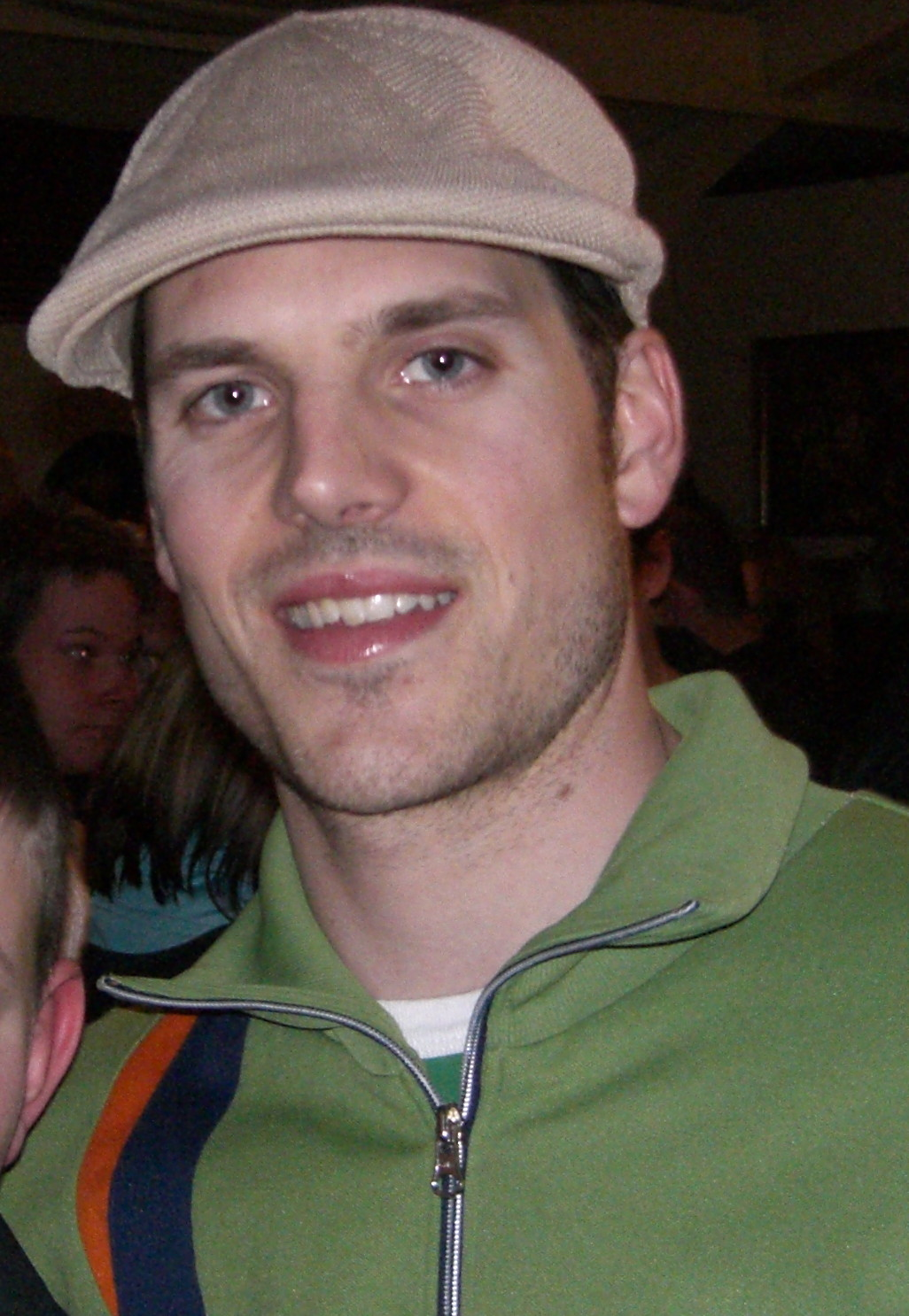
- Born: October 29, 1977 (age 48) Calgary, Alberta, Canada
- Height: 6 ft 2 in (188 cm)
- Weight: 190 lb (86 kg; 13 st 8 lb)
- Position: Centre
- Shot: Left
- Played for: Montreal Canadiens; Iserlohn Roosters; ERC Ingolstadt; HDD Olimpija Ljubljana
- NHL draft: 18th overall, 1996; Montreal Canadiens
- Playing career: 1997–2011

Matthew Warren Higgins(born October 29, 1977) is a Canadian former professional ice hockey centre who played in the National Hockey League (NHL) with the Montreal Canadiens.

== Playing career ==
Higgins was selected 18th overall in the 1996 NHL entry draft by the Montreal Canadiens. He played in 57 regular season NHL games throughout the 1997–98 NHL season to the 2000–01 NHL season. He began his hockey career with the Western Hockey League Moose Jaw Warriors in 1993 where he played until he was drafted.

Higgins then played for the American Hockey League Fredericton Canadiens and Quebec Citadelles. He played through two seasons for the Bridgeport Sound Tigers before moving to Europe to play for the Deutsche Eishockey Liga Iserlohn Roosters. He ended his professional career playing two seasons for HDD Olimpija Ljubljana of the Austrian Hockey League (EBEL).

== Career statistics ==
| | | | Regular season | | | | | Playoffs |
| Season | Team | League | GP | G | A | Pts | PIM | GP | G | A | Pts | PIM |
|---|---|---|---|---|---|---|---|---|---|---|---|---|
| 1993–94 | Moose Jaw Warriors | WHL | 64 | 6 | 10 | 16 | 10 | — | — | — | — | — |
| 1994–95 | Moose Jaw Warriors | WHL | 72 | 36 | 34 | 70 | 26 | 10 | 1 | 2 | 3 | 2 |
| 1995–96 | Moose Jaw Warriors | WHL | 67 | 30 | 33 | 63 | 43 | — | — | — | — | — |
| 1996–97 | Moose Jaw Warriors | WHL | 71 | 33 | 57 | 90 | 51 | 12 | 3 | 5 | 8 | 2 |
| 1997–98 | Fredericton Canadiens | AHL | 50 | 5 | 22 | 27 | 12 | 4 | 1 | 2 | 3 | 2 |
| 1997–98 | Montreal Canadiens | NHL | 1 | 0 | 0 | 0 | 0 | — | — | — | — | — |
| 1998–99 | Fredericton Canadiens | AHL | 11 | 3 | 4 | 7 | 6 | 5 | 0 | 2 | 2 | 0 |
| 1998–99 | Montreal Canadiens | NHL | 25 | 1 | 0 | 1 | 0 | — | — | — | — | — |
| 1999–2000 | Quebec Citadelles | AHL | 29 | 1 | 15 | 16 | 21 | — | — | — | — | — |
| 1999–2000 | Montreal Canadiens | NHL | 25 | 0 | 2 | 2 | 4 | — | — | — | — | — |
| 2000–01 | Quebec Citadelles | AHL | 66 | 10 | 18 | 28 | 18 | 8 | 0 | 1 | 1 | 4 |
| 2000–01 | Montreal Canadiens | NHL | 6 | 0 | 0 | 0 | 2 | — | — | — | — | — |
| 2001–02 | Bridgeport Sound Tigers | AHL | 43 | 13 | 19 | 32 | 24 | 15 | 1 | 0 | 1 | 6 |
| 2002–03 | Bridgeport Sound Tigers | AHL | 45 | 11 | 12 | 23 | 30 | 2 | 0 | 0 | 0 | 2 |
| 2003–04 | Iserlohn Roosters | DEL | 50 | 14 | 17 | 31 | 28 | — | — | — | — | — |
| 2004–05 | Iserlohn Roosters | DEL | 25 | 9 | 14 | 23 | 16 | — | — | — | — | — |
| 2005–06 | Iserlohn Roosters | DEL | 47 | 12 | 32 | 44 | 79 | — | — | — | — | — |
| 2006–07 | ERC Ingolstadt | DEL | 44 | 11 | 29 | 40 | 14 | 1 | 0 | 0 | 0 | 0 |
| 2007–08 | ERC Ingolstadt | DEL | 18 | 7 | 12 | 19 | 6 | 3 | 1 | 2 | 3 | 2 |
| 2008–09 | ERC Ingolstadt | DEL | 32 | 3 | 11 | 14 | 16 | — | — | — | — | — |
| 2009–10 | HDD Olimpija Ljubljana | EBEL | 16 | 3 | 6 | 9 | 16 | — | — | — | — | — |
| 2009–10 | HDD Olimpija Ljubljana | SVN | 4 | 0 | 3 | 3 | 4 | 2 | 1 | 2 | 3 | 0 |
| 2010–11 | HDD Olimpija Ljubljana | EBEL | 48 | 21 | 25 | 46 | 30 | 3 | 1 | 1 | 2 | 0 |
| 2010–11 | HDD Olimpija Ljubljana | SVN | 3 | 5 | 5 | 10 | 4 | 2 | 1 | 0 | 1 | 0 |
| AHL totals | | | 244 | 43 | 90 | 133 | 111 | 34 | 2 | 5 | 7 | 14 |
| NHL totals | | | 57 | 1 | 2 | 3 | 6 | — | — | — | — | — |
| DEL totals | | | 216 | 56 | 115 | 171 | 159 | 4 | 1 | 2 | 3 | 2 |

Awards and achievements
| Preceded by Terry Ryan | Montreal Canadiens first-round draft pick 1996 | Succeeded by Jason Ward |
