= Alain Héroux =

Canadian ice hockey player (born 1964)

- Born: May 20, 1964 (age 61) Terrebonne, Quebec, Canada
- Height: 6 ft 1 in (185 cm)
- Weight: 180 lb (82 kg; 12 st 12 lb)
- Position: Left Wing
- Played for: Nova Scotia Voyageurs (AHL); Sherbrooke Canadiens (AHL)
- NHL draft: 19th overall, 1982; Montreal Canadiens
- Playing career: 1983–1985

Alain Héroux (born May 20, 1964) is a Canadian former professional ice hockey left winger. He was drafted in the first round, 19th overall, by the Montreal Canadiens in the 1982 NHL entry draft. He never played in the National Hockey League, retiring after just one full professional season in the American Hockey League.

His younger brother Yves Héroux played one game in the National Hockey League with the Quebec Nordiques.

== Career statistics ==
=== Regular season and playoffs ===
			Regular season					Playoffs
Season	Team	League	GP	G	A	Pts	PIM	GP	G	A	Pts	PIM
1979–80	Boisbriand-Laurentides	QMAAA	7	1	0	1	2	2	0	0	0	0
1980–81	Boisbriand-Laurentides	QMAAA	48	14	17	31	30	—	—	—	—	—
1981–82	Chicoutimi Saguenéens	QMJHL	58	29	33	62	33	19	3	10	13	4
1982–83	Chicoutimi Saguenéens	QMJHL	61	34	61	95	37	5	3	3	6	8
1983–84	Chicoutimi Saguenéens	QMJHL	59	31	42	73	55	—	—	—	—	—
1983–84	Nova Scotia Voyageurs	AHL	4	1	1	2	2	12	3	2	5	4
1984–85	Sherbrooke Canadiens	AHL	48	7	11	18	20	—	—	—	—	—
QMJHL totals			178	94	136	230	125	24	6	13	19	12
AHL totals			52	8	12	20	22	12	3	2	5	4

Preceded by Jan Ingman	Montreal Canadiens first-round draft pick 1982	Succeeded by Alfie Turcotte
