= Elgin McCann =

Canadian ice hockey player (born 1946)

- Born: July 2, 1946 (age 79) Vancouver, British Columbia, Canada
- Height: 5 ft 8 in (173 cm)
- Weight: 175 lb (79 kg; 12 st 7 lb)
- Position: Right Wing
- Shot: Right
- Played for: New Haven Nighthawks (AHL); Houston Apollos (CHL); Memphis South Stars (CHL); Amarillo Wranglers (CHL); Muskegon Mohawks (IHL); Saginaw Gears (IHL); Columbus Owls (IHL); Kalamazoo Wings (IHL)
- NHL draft: 8th overall, 1967; Montreal Canadiens
- Playing career: 1967–1976

Elgin McCann (born July 2, 1946) is a Canadian former professional ice hockey right winger. He was drafted in the first round, eighth overall, by the Montreal Canadiens in the 1967 NHL Amateur Draft. He never played in the National Hockey League, however, spending his career playing for various minor-league teams.

McCann was born in Vancouver, British Columbia.

== Career statistics ==
Season	Team	Lge	Regular Season					Playoffs				
Season	Team	Lge	GP	G	A	Pts	PIM	GP	G	A	Pts	PIM
1967-68	Houston Apollos	CPHL	12	1	0	1	2	–	–	–	–	–
1967-68	Memphis South Stars	CPHL	8	1	3	4	2	3	0	0	0	0
1968-69	Muskegon Mohawks	IHL	3	0	1	1	0	–	–	–	–	–
1968-69	Amarillo Wranglers	CHL	1	0	0	0	0	–	–	–	–	–
1969-70	New Haven Blades	EHL	70	38	46	84	37	11	6	2	8	2
1970-71	New Haven Blades	EHL	72	35	38	73	43	14	6	6	12	4
1971-72	New Haven Blades	EHL	75	32	35	67	43	7	2	1	3	0
1972-73	Saginaw Gears	IHL	62	19	25	44	27	–	–	–	–	–
1972-73	New Haven Nighthawks	AHL	11	0	1	1	2	–	–	–	–	–
1973-74	Columbus Owls	IHL	72	9	19	28	45	6	0	1	1	4
1974-75	Columbus-Kalamazoo	IHL	75	28	10	38	24	–	–	–	–	–
1975-76	Kalamazoo Wings	IHL	10	0	2	2	4	–	–	–	–	–
1978-79	Brandon Olympics	CSHL	0	0	0	0	0	–	–	–	–	–

Preceded by Phil Myre	Montreal Canadiens first-round draft pick 1967	Succeeded by Michel Plasse
