= Nikita Scherbak =

Russian ice hockey player (born 1995)

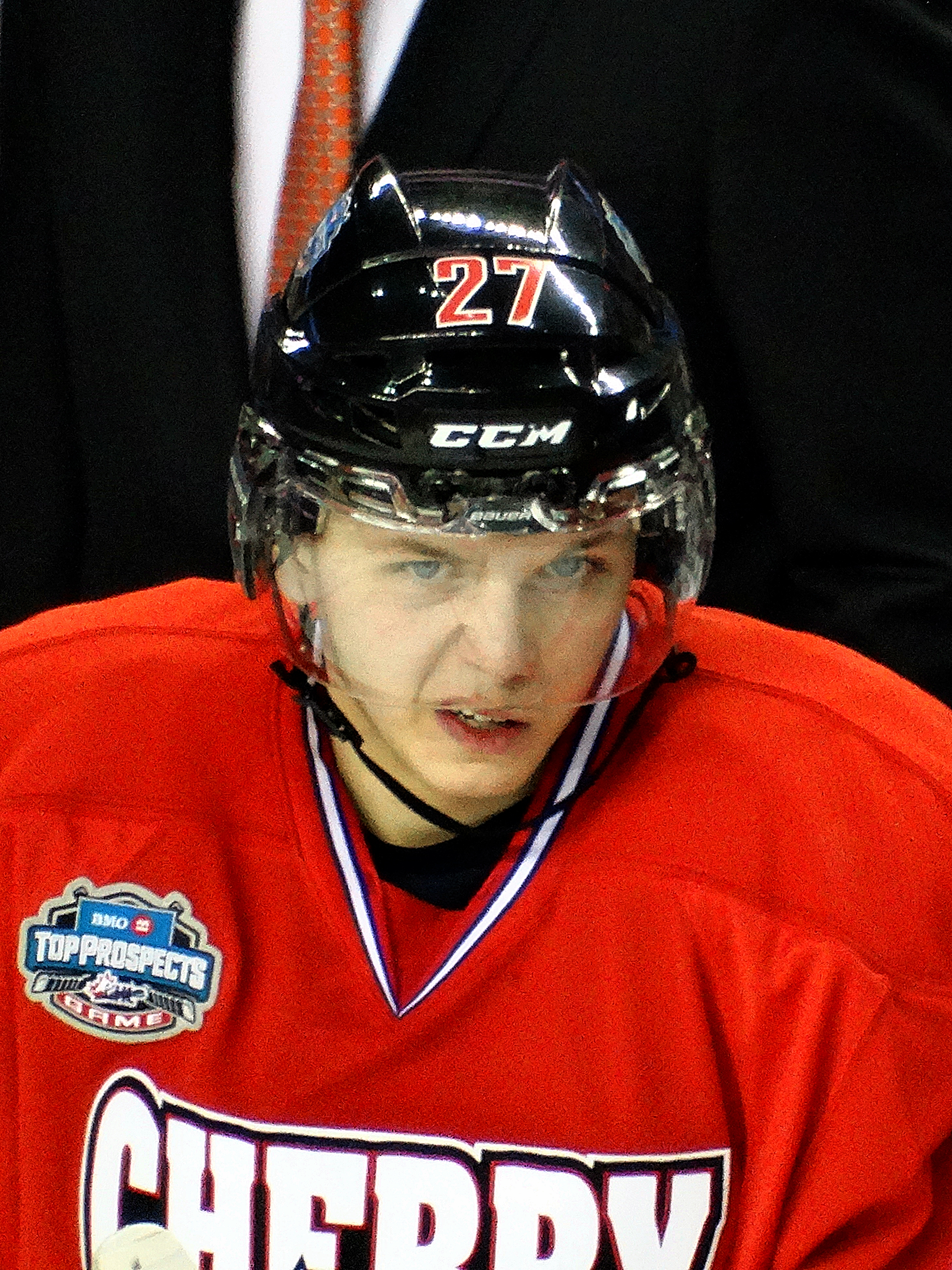
- Scherbak in 2014
- Born: December 30, 1995 (age 30) Moscow, Russia
- Height: 6 ft 1 in (185 cm)
- Weight: 192 lb (87 kg; 13 st 10 lb)
- Position: Right wing
- Shoots: Left
- ICE team Former teams: EC VSV; Montreal Canadiens; Los Angeles Kings; Avangard Omsk; Traktor Chelyabinsk; HC '05 Banská Bystrica; Mountfield HK; HC Slovan Bratislava; Ducs d'Angers
- NHL draft: 26th overall, 2014; Montreal Canadiens
- Playing career: 2015–present

Nikita Sergeevich Scherbak (Russian: Никита Сергеевич Щербак; born December 30, 1995) is a Russian professional ice hockey player for EC VSV of the ICE Hockey League. He was selected in the first round, 26th overall, by the Montreal Canadiens in the 2014 NHL entry draft. Scherbak has also previously played for the Los Angeles Kings.

== Playing career ==
=== Junior ===
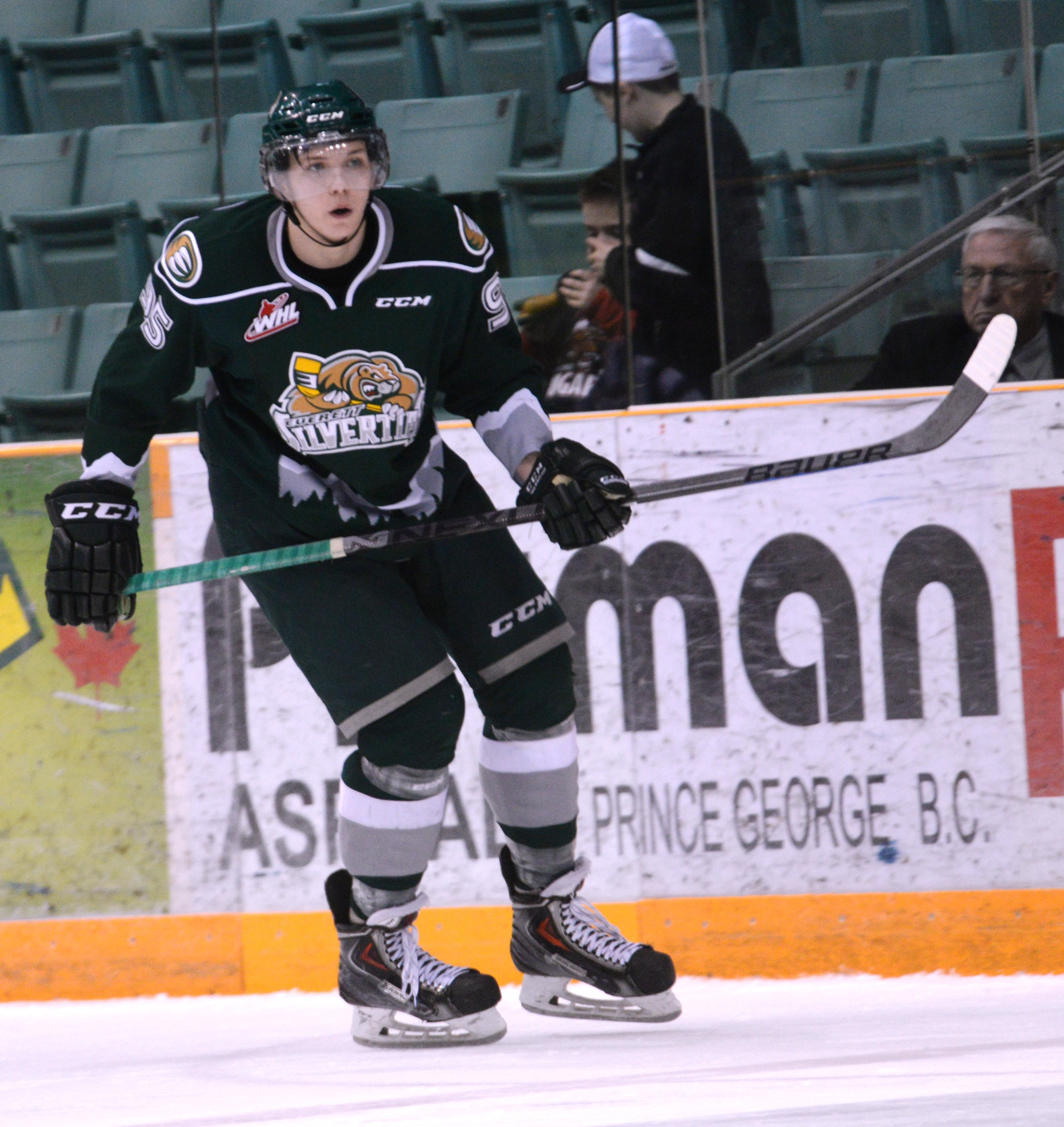
Nikita Scherbak with the Everett Silvertips in 2015

Scherbak began his junior career in 2012 playing with Kapitan Stupino in the Russian Junior Hockey League (MHL). Scherbak was drafted by the Saskatoon Blades of the Western Hockey League (WHL) in the second round of the 2013 Canadian Hockey League (CHL) Import Draft.

He joined the Blades in 2013 where he led all rookies in goals (28), assists (50), and points (78) during the 2013–14 WHL season. His outstanding play was rewarded when he was invited to play the 2014 CHL Top Prospects Game.

Scherbak was rated as a top National Hockey League (NHL) prospect who was viewed as a possible first round selection heading into the 2014 NHL entry draft. After his selection on July 22, 2014, he was signed to a three-year entry-level contract by draft team, the Montreal Canadiens.

On September 22, Scherbak was traded to the Everett Silvertips from Saskatoon based on league rules which state that no more than two non-North American players may be on the same club's roster at any given time.

=== Professional ===
During the 2016–17 season, Scherbak made his NHL debut for Montreal on January 7, 2017, against Toronto Maple Leafs and scored on the power play, on his first NHL career shot, to put the Canadiens up 3–2, with just 0.9 seconds left of the first period. Montreal would win the game by a final score of 5–3.

After starting the first 11 games of the 2018–19 season as a healthy scratch, Scherbak was assigned to the Laval Rocket, Montreal's American Hockey League (AHL) affiliate, for conditioning. He made his season debut on October 31, 2018, in a 2–1 loss against the Belleville Senators. On November 9, 2018, Scherbak scored his first goal of the season in a 5–1 victory over the Cleveland Monsters. He was recalled from the conditioning stint on November 14, 2018, but did not immediately rejoin the Canadiens because of a lower-body injury. On December 1, 2018, Scherbak was placed on waivers by the Canadiens. He was subsequently claimed by the Los Angeles Kings.

On June 25, 2019, having completed his contract with the Kings, Scherbak was not tendered a qualifying offer by the club, releasing him as a free agent. The following day, while opting to return to Russia to continue his career, Scherbak was officially signed to a three-year contract with Avangard Omsk of the Kontinental Hockey League (KHL). In his first KHL season in 2019–20, Scherbak opened with just 2 goals and 6 points through 16 games before being released. On November 5, 2019, Scherbak continued in the KHL, joining fellow club Traktor Chelyabinsk for the remainder of the season.

As an unrestricted free agent entering the pandemic delayed 2020–21 season, Scherbak opted to return to North America, agreeing to a one-year AHL contract with the Texas Stars, affiliate of the Dallas Stars, on January 23, 2021. He was productive during his tenure with Texas, collecting 5 goals and 15 points through 28 appearances in the shortened season.

As a free agent in the offseason, Scherbak returned to Europe in securing a contract with Tipos Extraliga club, HC '05 Banská Bystrica, on September 9, 2021. Scherbak would finish the 2021–22 season with Mountfield HK of the Czech Extraliga, joining the team in January 2022.

With tension rising amidst the Russo-Ukrainian War entering the 2022–23 season, Scherbak would be forced to leave the Czech Republic due to his visa renewal application being denied based on his Russian nationality. As a result, he returned to Tipos Extraliga, signing with HC Slovan Bratislava for the remainder of the season.

In July 2023, Scherbak joined the Ducs d'Angers of the Ligue Magnus, the top men's division of ice hockey in France.

On April 26, 2024, Scherbak agreed to a one-year contract with Austrian-based EC VSV of the ICE Hockey League. In April 2025 his contract with the EC VSV got extended for one year.

== Career statistics ==
			Regular season					Playoffs
Season	Team	League	GP	G	A	Pts	PIM	GP	G	A	Pts	PIM
2012–13	Kapitan Stupino	MHL	50	7	7	14	14	—	—	—	—	—
2013–14	Saskatoon Blades	WHL	65	28	50	78	46	—	—	—	—	—
2014–15	Everett Silvertips	WHL	65	27	55	82	60	11	3	5	8	10
2015–16	St. John's IceCaps	AHL	48	7	16	23	20	—	—	—	—	—
2016–17	St. John's IceCaps	AHL	66	13	28	41	32	4	1	1	2	4
2016–17	Montreal Canadiens	NHL	3	1	0	1	0	—	—	—	—	—
2017–18	Laval Rocket	AHL	26	7	23	30	20	—	—	—	—	—
2017–18	Montreal Canadiens	NHL	26	4	2	6	8	—	—	—	—	—
2018–19	Laval Rocket	AHL	5	1	0	1	2	—	—	—	—	—
2018–19	Los Angeles Kings	NHL	8	1	0	1	2	—	—	—	—	—
2018–19	Ontario Reign	AHL	23	4	7	11	18	—	—	—	—	—
2019–20	Avangard Omsk	KHL	16	2	4	6	10	—	—	—	—	—
2019–20	Traktor Chelyabinsk	KHL	15	1	4	5	12	—	—	—	—	—
2020–21	Texas Stars	AHL	28	5	10	15	12	—	—	—	—	—
2021–22	HC '05 Banská Bystrica	Slovak	25	6	15	21	20	—	—	—	—	—
2021–22	Mountfield HK	ELH	17	4	8	12	4	5	1	1	2	6
2022–23	Mountfield HK	ELH	5	1	4	5	4	—	—	—	—	—
2022–23	HC Slovan Bratislava	Slovak	10	2	6	8	2	4	1	1	2	2
2023–24	Ducs d'Angers	Ligue Magnus	41	10	37	47	63	6	2	1	3	8
NHL totals			37	6	2	8	10	—	—	—	—	—
KHL totals			31	3	8	11	22	—	—	—	—	—

== Awards and honours ==
Award	Year
WHL
CHL Top Prospects Game (Team Cherry)	2014

Awards and achievements
Preceded by Michael McCarron	Montreal Canadiens first-round draft pick 2014	Succeeded by Noah Juulsen
