= Lindsay Vallis =

Canadian ice hockey player (born 1971)

- Born: January 12, 1971 (age 55) Winnipeg, Manitoba, Canada
- Height: 6 ft 3 in (191 cm)
- Weight: 205 lb (93 kg; 14 st 9 lb)
- Position: Right wing
- Shot: Right
- Played for: Montreal Canadiens
- NHL draft: 13th overall, 1989; Montreal Canadiens
- Playing career: 1991–2000

Lindsay Grant Vallis (born January 12, 1971) is a Canadian former professional ice hockey right winger. He was drafted in the first round, thirteenth overall, of the 1989 NHL entry draft by the Montreal Canadiens. He played just one game in the National Hockey League, with the Canadiens during the 1993–94 season, going scoreless.

== Career statistics ==
			Regular season					Playoffs
Season	Team	League	GP	G	A	Pts	PIM	GP	G	A	Pts	PIM
1987–88	Seattle Thunderbirds	WHL	68	31	45	76	65	—	—	—	—	—
1988–89	Seattle Thunderbirds	WHL	63	21	32	53	48	—	—	—	—	—
1989–90	Seattle Thunderbirds	WHL	65	34	43	77	68	13	6	5	11	14
1990–91	Seattle Thunderbirds	WHL	72	41	38	79	119	6	1	3	4	17
1990–91	Fredericton Canadiens	AHL	—	—	—	—	—	7	0	0	0	6
1991–92	Fredericton Canadiens	AHL	71	10	19	29	84	4	0	1	1	7
1992–93	Fredericton Canadiens	AHL	65	18	16	34	38	5	0	2	2	10
1993–94	Montreal Canadiens	NHL	1	0	0	0	0	—	—	—	—	—
1993–94	Fredericton Canadiens	AHL	75	9	30	39	103	—	—	—	—	—
1994–95	Worcester IceCats	AHL	14	0	7	7	28	—	—	—	—	—
1995–96	Worcester IceCats	AHL	65	9	19	28	81	4	0	2	2	4
1996–97	Bakersfield Fog	WCHL	58	26	65	91	82	4	0	3	3	0
1997–98	Bakersfield Fog	WCHL	41	21	24	45	34	4	1	2	3	26
1998–99	Hershey Bears	AHL	4	1	0	1	0	—	—	—	—	—
1998–99	Asheville Smoke	UHL	66	27	73	100	46	4	3	0	3	0
1999–2000	Asheville Smoke	UHL	69	24	52	76	54	2	0	1	1	2
AHL totals			294	47	91	138	334	20	0	5	5	27

== See also ==
- List of players who played only one game in the NHL

Preceded by Éric Charron	Montreal Canadiens first-round draft pick 1989	Succeeded by Turner Stevenson
