= Turner Stevenson =

Canadian ice hockey player

- Born: May 18, 1972 (age 53) Prince George, British Columbia, Canada
- Height: 6 ft 3 in (191 cm)
- Weight: 230 lb (104 kg; 16 st 6 lb)
- Position: Right wing
- Shot: Right
- Played for: Montreal Canadiens; New Jersey Devils; Philadelphia Flyers
- National team: Canada
- NHL draft: 12th overall, 1990; Montreal Canadiens
- Playing career: 1992–2006

Turner Ladd Stevenson (born May 18, 1972) is a Canadian former professional ice hockey right winger who played 13 seasons in the National Hockey League (NHL) for the Montreal Canadiens, New Jersey Devils, and Philadelphia Flyers. He won the Stanley Cup with New Jersey in 2003.

== Playing career ==
Drafted 12th overall in the 1990 NHL entry draft by the Montreal Canadiens, Stevenson played his first nine professional seasons with the Canadiens. Left exposed in the 2000 NHL Expansion Draft, he was claimed by the Columbus Blue Jackets, who then sent him to the New Jersey Devils to complete a previous trade involving Krzysztof Oliwa. He spent the next four seasons with New Jersey, winning the Stanley Cup in 2003. Following the 2003–04 season, he signed a three-year contract with the Philadelphia Flyers. Stevenson only played 31 games with the Flyers during a 2005–06 season in which he struggled due to hip problems and the Flyers bought him out following the season. He retired on April 13, 2007, and became an assistant coach with the Seattle Thunderbirds, the team he played for prior to his professional career.

== Personal Info ==
Born and raised in the small northern community of Mackenzie, British Columbia, Stevenson began playing hockey at an early age on a small skating rink constructed next to his home in the Gantahaz Lake area.

As of 2019, Stevenson lives in Seattle, where he coaches for the Everett Silvertips junior hockey team.

== Awards ==
- 1991–92: West First All-Star Team (WHL)
- 1991–92: Memorial Cup All-Star Team (CHL)
- 2002–03: Stanley Cup New Jersey Devils (NHL)

== Career statistics ==
=== Regular season and playoffs ===
			Regular season					Playoffs
Season	Team	League	GP	G	A	Pts	PIM	GP	G	A	Pts	PIM
1988–89	Seattle Thunderbirds	WHL	69	15	12	27	84	—	—	—	—	—
1989–90	Seattle Thunderbirds	WHL	62	29	32	61	276	13	3	2	5	35
1990–91	Fredericton Canadiens	AHL	—	—	—	—	—	4	0	0	0	5
1991–92	Seattle Thunderbirds	WHL	58	20	32	52	304	15	9	3	12	55
1992–93	Fredericton Canadiens	AHL	79	25	34	59	102	5	2	3	5	11
1992–93	Montreal Canadiens	NHL	1	0	0	0	0	—	—	—	—	—
1993–94	Fredericton Canadiens	AHL	66	19	28	47	155	—	—	—	—	—
1993–94	Montreal Canadiens	NHL	2	0	0	0	2	—	—	—	—	—
1994–95	Fredericton Canadiens	AHL	37	12	12	24	109	—	—	—	—	—
1994–95	Montreal Canadiens	NHL	41	6	1	7	86	—	—	—	—	—
1995–96	Montreal Canadiens	NHL	80	9	16	25	167	6	0	1	1	2
1996–97	Montreal Canadiens	NHL	65	8	13	21	97	5	1	1	2	2
1997–98	Montreal Canadiens	NHL	63	4	6	10	110	10	3	4	7	12
1998–99	Montreal Canadiens	NHL	69	10	17	27	88	—	—	—	—	—
1999–2000	Montreal Canadiens	NHL	64	8	13	21	61	—	—	—	—	—
2000–01	New Jersey Devils	NHL	69	8	18	26	97	23	1	3	4	20
2001–02	New Jersey Devils	NHL	21	0	2	2	25	1	0	0	0	4
2002–03	New Jersey Devils	NHL	77	7	13	20	115	14	1	1	2	26
2003–04	New Jersey Devils	NHL	61	14	13	27	76	5	0	0	0	0
2005–06	Philadelphia Flyers	NHL	31	1	3	4	45	—	—	—	—	—
NHL totals			644	75	115	190	969	67	6	12	18	66

=== International ===
Year	Team	Event	GP	G	A	Pts	PIM
1992	Canada	WJC	7	0	2	2	14

Preceded by Lindsay Vallis	Montreal Canadiens first-round draft pick 1990	Succeeded by Brent Bilodeau
