= Roger Belisle =

Canadian ice hockey player (born 1947)

- Born: October 31, 1947 (age 78) Val-d'Or, Quebec, CAN
- Height: 5 ft 10 in (178 cm)
- Weight: 170 lb (77 kg; 12 st 2 lb)
- Position: Centre
- Shot: Left
- Played for: IHL; Muskegon Mohawks
- NHL draft: 2nd overall, 1968; Montreal Canadiens
- Playing career: 1968–1969

Roger Belisle (born October 31, 1947) is a Canadian former professional ice hockey player. He was selected by the Montreal Canadiens in the 1st round (2nd overall) of the 1968 NHL Amateur Draft.

Belisle played with the Muskegon Mohawks of the International Hockey League during the 1968–69 season.

== Career statistics ==
			Regular season					Playoffs
Season	Team	League	GP	G	A	Pts	PIM	GP	G	A	Pts	PIM
1964–65	Val d'Or Kinsmen	QNWJHL	24	18	29	47	10	—	—	—	—	—
1965–66	Val d'Or Kinsmen	QNWJHL	24	30	40	70	12	—	—	—	—	—
1966–67	Drummondville Rangers	QJAHL	?	?	?	?	?	—	—	—	—	—
1966–67	Montreal North Beavers	MMJHL	14	9	15	24	24	—	—	—	—	—
1968–69	Muskegon Mohawks	IHL	11	2	2	4	0	—	—	—	—	—
IHL totals			11	2	2	4	0	—	—	—	—	—
