= 1999 World Junior Ice Hockey Championships =

1999 IIHF U20 World Championship

Tournament details
- Host country: Canada
- Venues: 6 (in 6 host cities)
- Dates: December 26, 1998 – January 5, 1999
- Teams: 10

Final positions
- Champions: Russia (1st title)
- Runners-up: Canada
- Third place: Slovakia
- Fourth place: Sweden

Tournament statistics
- Games played: 31
- Goals scored: 225 (7.26 per game)
- Attendance: 173,453 (5,595 per game)
- Scoring leader: (United States) Brian Gionta (11 points)

The 1999 World Junior Ice Hockey Championships (1999 WJC) was held in Winnipeg, and five other communities in Manitoba, Canada from December 26, 1998, to January 5, 1999. In the gold medal match at Winnipeg Arena, Russia defeated Canada 3–2 on Artem Chubarov's overtime goal. The bronze medal was claimed by Slovakia, giving the six-year-old country its first medal at an IIHF event.

The playoff round reverted to six teams qualifying, with group leaders getting a bye to the semifinals.

== Pool A ==
=== Group A ===
Pos	Team	Pld	W	D	L	GF	GA	GD	Pts	Qualification
1	Slovakia	4	3	1	0	10	7	+3	7	Semifinals
2	Canada	4	2	1	1	10	9	+1	5	Quarterfinals
3	Finland	4	2	0	2	17	16	+1	4	Quarterfinals
4	Czech Republic	4	1	0	3	11	12	−1	2	Relegation round
5	United States	4	1	0	3	13	17	−4	2	Relegation round

Source: IIHF.net at the Wayback Machine

December 26, 1998	Slovakia	3–2	Czech Republic	Keystone Centre, Brandon

December 26, 1998	Finland	6–3	United States	Winnipeg Arena, Winnipeg

December 27, 1998	Slovakia	0–0 (0–0, 0–0, 0–0)	Canada	Keystone Centre, Brandon; Attendance: 6,000

Ján Lašák	Goalies	Roberto Luongo
36	Shots	31

December 28, 1998	Canada	6–4 (3–0, 1–3, 2–1)	Finland	Winnipeg Arena, Winnipeg; Attendance: 13,225

Roberto Luongo
Goalies
Mika Noronen

Calder) (Stuart, Tkaczuk) (PP) – 1:50	1–0
Chimera (Allen) – 2:37	2–0
Fata (Tkaczuk) – 13:13	3–0
	3–1	22:46 – Somervuori (Gustafsson, Hagman)
	3–2	30:14 – Ahonen (Laatikainen, Somervuori)
Chimera (Leeb, Druken) – 30:59	4–2
	4–3	49:18 – Kauppinen (Koskela, Hagman) (PP)
Tkaczuk (Calder) – 46:54	5–3
Gagné (EN) – 59:50	6–3
	6–4	59:43 – Valtonen (Kauppinen, Väänänen) (PP)

28
Shots
40

December 28, 1998	Czech Republic	6–3	United States	Keystone Centre, Brandon

December 29, 1998	Slovakia	4–3	Finland	Winnipeg Arena, Winnipeg

December 30, 1998	Canada	2–0 (1–0, 0–0, 1–0)	Czech Republic	Winnipeg Arena, Winnipeg; Attendance: 13,225

Roberto Luongo	Goalies	Vlastimil Lakosil
Campbell (Tkaczuk), Calder) – 18:10 / 1–0; Tkaczuk (Fata, Chimera) – 54:25 / 2–0
32	Shots	29

December 30, 1998	Slovakia	3–2	United States	Selkirk Recreation Complex, Selkirk

December 31, 1998	United States	5–2 (1–0, 3–2, 1–0)	Canada	Winnipeg Arena, Winnipeg; Attendance: 13,225

Joe Blackburn
Goalies
Roberto Luongo

Gionta – 14:46	1–0
	1–1	23:42 – Mair
Murphy (Gionta, Gomez) – 26:23	2–1
Heisten (Gomez, Mara) (PP) – 28:03	3–1
Gionta (Murphy, Gomez) – 30:33	4–1
	4–2	37:21 – Tkaczuk (A. Ference, Calder) (PP)
Gomez (Mara, Blackburn) (PP) – 41:15	5–2

33
Shots
38

December 31, 1998	Finland	4–3	Czech Republic	Selkirk Recreation Complex, Selkirk

=== Group B ===
Pos	Team	Pld	W	D	L	GF	GA	GD	Pts	Qualification
1	Sweden	4	4	0	0	25	11	+14	8	Semifinals
2	Russia	4	3	0	1	25	4	+21	6	Quarterfinals
3	Kazakhstan	4	1	1	2	9	20	−11	3	Quarterfinals
4	Switzerland	4	1	0	3	5	17	−12	2	Relegation round
5	Belarus	4	0	1	3	9	21	−12	1	Relegation round

Source: IIHF.net at the Wayback Machine

December 26, 1998	Sweden	4–2	Russia	Winnipeg Arena, Winnipeg

December 26, 1998	Switzerland	4–3	Belarus	Selkirk Recreation Complex, Selkirk

December 27, 1998	Kazakhstan	2–2	Belarus	Centennial Arena, Portage la Prairie

December 28, 1998	Sweden	5–1	Switzerland	Winnipeg Arena, Winnipeg

December 28, 1998	Russia	7–0	Kazakhstan	Centennial Arena, Portage la Prairie

December 29, 1998	Russia	10–0	Belarus	Keystone Centre, Brandon

December 30, 1998	Kazakhstan	3–0	Switzerland	Keystone Centre, Brandon

December 30, 1998	Sweden	5–4	Belarus	Morden Recreation Centre, Morden

December 31, 1998	Russia	6–0	Switzerland	Keystone Centre, Brandon

December 31, 1998	Sweden	11–4	Kazakhstan	Teulon-Rockwood Arena, Teulon

=== Relegation round ===
Pos	Team	Pld	W	D	L	GF	GA	GD	Pts	Relegation
1	Czech Republic	3	3	0	0	21	9	+12	6	
2	United States	3	2	0	1	15	12	+3	4	
3	Switzerland	3	1	0	2	12	13	−1	2	
4	Belarus	3	0	0	3	7	21	−14	0	Relegated to the 2000 Pool B

Source: IIHF.net at the Wayback Machine

December 26, 1998	Switzerland	4–3	Belarus	Selkirk Recreation Complex, Selkirk

December 28, 1998	Czech Republic	6–3	United States	Keystone Centre, Brandon

January 3, 1999	Czech Republic	10–2	Belarus	Winnipeg Arena, Winnipeg

January 3, 1999	United States	5–4	Switzerland	Centennial Arena, Portage la Prairie

January 4, 1999	Czech Republic	5–4	Switzerland	Morden Recreation Centre, Morden

January 4, 1999	United States	7–2	Belarus	Selkirk Recreation Complex, Selkirk

Belarus was relegated for the 2000 World Juniors

=== Final round ===
Quarterfinals
A2	Canada	12
B3	Kazakhstan	2
B2	Russia	3
A3	Finland	2

Semifinals
QF1	Canada	6
B1	Sweden	1
QF2	Russia	3
A1	Slovakia	2

Final
SF1	Canada	2
SF2	Russia	3
Third place
QF1	Sweden	4
QF2	Slovakia	5

==== Quarterfinals ====
January 2, 1999	Canada	12–2 (3–0, 5–0, 4–2)	Kazakhstan	Winnipeg Arena, Winnipeg; Attendance: 13,225

Roberto Luongo
Goalies
Vitali Kolesnik

Bouck (Mair, Ward) – 2:22	1–0
Gagné (Morrow, B. Ference) – 5:39	2–0
Tkaczuk (Fata, Calder – 15:20	3–0
Gagné (Morrow, Leeb) – 21:05	4–0
Ward – 33:25	5–0
Tkaczuk (Calder) – 34:22	6–0
Gagné (Leeb, Morrow) – 34:52	7–0
Leeb (Morrow, Van Ryn) – 35:08	8–0
	8–1	40:50 – Zarzhytsky (Yeremeyev, Litvinenko)
Morrow (Leeb) – 42:30	9–1
Druken (McDonell, Chimera) – 43:24	10–1
Morrow – 46:39	11–1
	11–2	47:27 – Zarzhytsky (Yakovlev, Antropov)
Gagné (Leeb, Morrow) – 58:45	12–2

36
Shots
21

January 2, 1999	Russia	3 – 2 OT (1–0, 0–2, 1–0, 1–0)	Finland	Winnipeg Arena, Winnipeg; Attendance: 6,960

Alexei Volkov
Goalies
Mika Lehto

Lyashenko (Schastlivy, Verenikin) – 10:10	1–0
	1–1	20:34 – Hagman (Mikkola)
	1–2	24:33 – Elomo (Väänänen, Virkkunen)
Kirilenko (Vishnevski) – 53:41	2–2
Denis Arkhipov (Dobryshkin) (PP) – 67:33	3–2

46
Shots
21

==== Semifinals ====
January 4, 1999	Sweden	1–6 (1–1, 0–2, 0–3)	Canada	Winnipeg Arena, Winnipeg; Attendance: 13,225

Andreas Andersson
Goalies
Roberto Luongo

Karlin (Wallin, Persson) – 11:31	1–0
	1–1	15:01 – McDonell (A. Ference, B. Ference)
	1–2	23:18 – Gagné (SH)
	1–3	35:41 – Tkaczuk (Calder, Fata) (PP)
	1–4	41:49 – Leeb (Morrow)
	1–5	43:58 – A. Ference (PP)
	1–6	48:35 – Calder (Tkaczuk)

27
Shots
22

January 4, 1999	Slovakia	2–3 (0–2, 2–1, 0–0)	Russia	Winnipeg Arena, Winnipeg

	0–1	Balmochnykh (Arkhipov, Maslennikov) – 1:29
	0–2	Dobryshkin (Vishnevski, Nikitenko) – 15:04
	0–3	Verenikin (Lyashenko, Donika) (PP) – 23:22
31:29 – Cibak (Sejna, Cakajik) (PP)	1–3
32:03 – Hudec (Hujsa)	2–3

==== 5th place game ====
January 4, 1999	Finland	6–1 (2–1, 2–0, 2–0,)	Kazakhstan	Keystone Centre, Brandon

==== Bronze medal game ====
January 5, 1999	Sweden	4–5 (0–2, 3–1, 1–2)	Slovakia (bronze)	Winnipeg Arena, Winnipeg

==== Gold medal game ====
January 5, 1999	(silver) Canada	2–3 OT (0–1, 1–1, 1–0) (OT: 0–1)	Russia (gold)	Winnipeg Arena, Winnipeg; Attendance: 13,225

	0–1	19:07 – Chubarov (Dobryshkin)
Simon Gagné (Campbell, Luongo) – 29:59	1–1
	1–2	34:23 – Balmochnykh (Zevakhin, Maslennikov)
Bryan Allen – 53:52	2–2
	2–3	65:13 – Chubarov (Afinogenov, Kirilenko)

40
Shots
18

=== Final standings ===
Rank	Country
1st place, gold medalist(s)	Russia
2nd place, silver medalist(s)	Canada
3rd place, bronze medalist(s)	Slovakia
4	Sweden
5	Finland
6	Kazakhstan
7	Czech Republic
8	United States
9	Switzerland
10	Belarus

=== Scoring leaders ===
Player	Country	GP	G	A	Pts	+/-	PIM
Brian Gionta	United States	6	6	5	11	−1	6
Daniel Tkaczuk	Canada	7	6	4	10	+1	10
Daniel Sedin	Sweden	6	5	5	10	+6	2
Scott Gomez	United States	6	3	7	10	+2	4
Henrik Sedin	Sweden	6	3	6	9	+7	10
Tomáš Divíšek	Czech Republic	6	2	7	9	+2	6
Simon Gagné	Canada	7	7	1	8	+9	2
Christian Berglund	Sweden	6	4	4	8	+5	33
Eero Somervuori	Finland	6	4	4	8	0	2
Niklas Hagman	Finland	6	3	5	8	+3	2
Nik Antropov	Kazakhstan	6	3	5	8	−3	14

=== Goaltending leaders ===
(minimum 40% team's total ice time)

Pos	Player	Country	TOI	GA	GAA	Sv%	SO
1	Roberto Luongo	Canada	405:13	13	1.92	94.20	2
2	Alexei Volkov	Russia	407:27	10	1.47	93.55	0
3	Mika Lehto	Finland	206:52	8	2.32	93.28	0
4	Ján Lašák	Slovakia	359:48	14	2.33	92.71	1
5	Vlastimil Lakosil	Czech Republic	358:55	18	3.01	90.77	0

TOI = Time On Ice (minutes:seconds); GA = Goals against; GAA = Goals against average; Sv% = Save percentage; SO = Shutouts

=== Tournament awards ===
	IIHF Directorate Awards	Media All-Star Team
Goaltender	(Canada) Roberto Luongo	(Canada) Roberto Luongo
Defencemen	(Russia) Vitaly Vishnevskiy	(Canada) Brian Campbell (Russia) Vitaly Vishnevskiy
Forwards	(Russia) Maxim Afinogenov	(Canada) Daniel Tkaczuk (United States) Brian Gionta (Russia) Maxim Balmochnykh

== Pool B ==
The Pool B tournament was played in Székesfehérvár and Dunaújváros, Hungary from December 27, 1998, to January 3, 1999. Two groups of four played round robins, and then the top three played each of the top three teams from the other group. All scores carried forward except the results against the lone eliminated team from each group.

=== Preliminary round ===
==== Group A ====
Pos	Team	Pld	W	D	L	GF	GA	GD	Pts	Qualification	Denmark men's national junior ice hockey team	Latvia men's national junior ice hockey team	Germany men's national junior ice hockey team	Hungary men's national junior ice hockey team
1	Denmark	3	2	0	1	8	7	+1	4	Medal round		4–3	2–1	2–3
2	Latvia	3	2	0	1	8	5	+3	4	Medal round	3–4		3–1	2–0
3	Germany	3	1	0	2	10	5	+5	2	Medal round	1–2	1–3		8–0
4	Hungary	3	1	0	2	3	12	−9	2	Relegation round	3–2	0–2	0–8	

Source: IIHF.net at the Wayback Machine
Legend: Blue = home team win; Yellow = draw; Red = away team win.

==== Group B ====
Pos	Team	Pld	W	D	L	GF	GA	GD	Pts	Qualification	Ukraine men's national junior ice hockey team	Poland men's national junior ice hockey team	Norway men's national junior ice hockey team	France men's national junior ice hockey team
1	Ukraine	3	2	1	0	12	8	+4	5	Medal round		3–3	5–3	4–2
2	Poland	3	1	1	1	11	10	+1	3	Medal round	3–3		5–2	3–5
3	Norway	3	1	0	2	12	13	−1	2	Medal round	3–5	2–5		7–3
4	France	3	1	0	2	10	14	−4	2	Relegation round	2–4	5–3	3–7	

Source: IIHF.net at the Wayback Machine
Legend: Blue = home team win; Yellow = draw; Red = away team win.

=== Medal round ===
Pos	Team	Pld	W	D	L	GF	GA	GD	Pts	Promotion	Ukraine men's national junior ice hockey team	Poland men's national junior ice hockey team	Denmark men's national junior ice hockey team	Germany men's national junior ice hockey team	Latvia men's national junior ice hockey team	Norway men's national junior ice hockey team
1	Ukraine	5	4	1	0	26	11	+15	9	Promoted to the 2000 Pool A		3–3	7–3	5–1	6–1	5–3
2	Poland	5	3	2	0	17	11	+6	8		3–3		2–2	3–2	4–2	5–2
3	Denmark	5	3	1	1	16	15	+1	7		3–7	2–2		2–1	4–3	5–2
4	Germany	5	1	0	4	11	14	−3	2		1–5	2–3	1–2		1–3	6–1
5	Latvia	5	1	0	4	10	17	−7	2		1–6	2–4	3–4	3–1		1–2
6	Norway	5	1	0	4	10	22	−12	2		3–5	2–5	2–5	1–6	2–1	

Source: IIHF.net at the Wayback Machine
Legend: Blue = home team win; Yellow = draw; Red = away team win.

Ukraine was promoted to Pool A for 2000.

=== Relegation round ===
France	3–1 (2–0, 1–1, 0–0)	Hungary

France	9–1 (1–0, 4–1, 4–0)	Hungary

Hungary lost two games to none and was relegated to Pool C for 2000.

== Pool C ==
The Pool C tournament was played in Kaunas and Elektrėnai, Lithuania from December 30, 1998, to January 3, 1999.

=== Preliminary round ===
==== Group A ====
Pos	Team	Pld	W	D	L	GF	GA	GD	Pts	Japan men's national junior ice hockey team	Austria men's national junior ice hockey team	Lithuania men's national junior ice hockey team	Croatia men's national junior ice hockey team
1	Japan	3	3	0	0	16	4	+12	6		7–1	4–1	5–2
2	Austria	3	2	0	1	15	11	+4	4	1–7		5–2	9–2
3	Lithuania	3	0	1	2	8	14	−6	1	1–4	2–5		5–5
4	Croatia	3	0	1	2	9	19	−10	1	2–5	2–9	5–5	

Source: IIHF.net at the Wayback Machine
Legend: Blue = home team win; Yellow = draw; Red = away team win.

==== Group B ====
Pos	Team	Pld	W	D	L	GF	GA	GD	Pts	Italy men's national junior ice hockey team	Slovenia men's national junior ice hockey team	Estonia men's national junior ice hockey team	Great Britain men's national junior ice hockey team
1	Italy	3	2	0	1	9	6	+3	4		4–2	0–2	5–2
2	Slovenia	3	2	0	1	13	9	+4	4	2–4		5–4	6–1
3	Estonia	3	1	1	1	9	8	+1	3	2–0	4–5		3–3
4	Great Britain	3	0	1	2	6	14	−8	1	2–5	1–6	3–3	

Source: IIHF.net at the Wayback Machine
Legend: Blue = home team win; Yellow = draw; Red = away team win.

=== Placement games ===
==== 7th place game ====
January 3, 1999	Croatia	1–3 (0–1, 1–1, 0–1)	Great Britain

Croatia was relegated to Pool D for the 2000 World Junior Ice Hockey Championships.

==== 5th place game ====
January 3, 1999	Lithuania	3–4 OT (2–2, 1–1, 0–0) (OT: 0–1)	Estonia

==== 3rd place game ====
January 3, 1999	Austria	2–6 (1–3, 0–3, 1–0)	Slovenia

==== 1st place game ====
January 3, 1999	Japan	0–1 (0–0, 0–1, 0–0)	Italy

Italy was promoted to Pool B for the 2000 World Junior Ice Hockey Championships.

== Pool D ==
The Pool D tournament was played in Novi Sad, FR Yugoslavia from December 29, 1998, to January 4, 1999.

=== Group A ===
Pos	Team	Pld	W	D	L	GF	GA	GD	Pts	Romania men's national junior ice hockey team	South Africa men's national junior ice hockey team	Bulgaria men's national junior ice hockey team
1	Romania	2	2	0	0	30	0	+30	4		5–0	25–0
2	South Africa	2	1	0	1	10	9	+1	2	0–5		10–4
3	Bulgaria	2	0	0	2	4	35	−31	0	0–25	4–10	

Source: IIHF.net at the Wayback Machine
Legend: Blue = home team win; Yellow = draw; Red = away team win.

=== Group B ===
Pos	Team	Pld	W	D	L	GF	GA	GD	Pts	Netherlands men's national junior ice hockey team	Mexico men's national junior ice hockey team	Turkey men's national junior ice hockey team
1	Netherlands	2	2	0	0	44	3	+41	4		7–3	37–0
2	Mexico	2	1	0	1	31	8	+23	2	3–7		28–1
3	Turkey	2	0	0	2	1	65	−64	0	0–37	1–28	

Source: IIHF.net at the Wayback Machine
Legend: Blue = home team win; Yellow = draw; Red = away team win.

=== Group C ===
Pos	Team	Pld	W	D	L	GF	GA	GD	Pts	Serbia and Montenegro men's national junior ice hockey team	Spain men's national junior ice hockey team	Iceland men's national junior ice hockey team
1	FR Yugoslavia	2	2	0	0	21	2	+19	4		6–1	15–1
2	Spain	2	0	1	1	6	11	−5	1	1–6		5–5
3	Iceland	2	0	1	1	6	20	−14	1	1–15	5–5	

Source: IIHF.net at the Wayback Machine
Legend: Blue = home team win; Yellow = draw; Red = away team win.

=== 1st–3rd place group ===
Pos	Team	Pld	W	D	L	GF	GA	GD	Pts	Promotion	Serbia and Montenegro men's national junior ice hockey team	Netherlands men's national junior ice hockey team	Romania men's national junior ice hockey team
1	FR Yugoslavia	2	2	0	0	9	2	+7	4	Promoted to the 2000 Pool C		4–1	5–1
2	Netherlands	2	1	0	1	7	6	+1	2		1–4		6–2
3	Romania	2	0	0	2	3	11	−8	0		1–5	2–6	

Source: IIHF.net at the Wayback Machine
Legend: Blue = home team win; Yellow = draw; Red = away team win.

FR Yugoslavia was promoted to Pool C for 2000.

=== 4th–6th place group ===
Pos	Team	Pld	W	D	L	GF	GA	GD	Pts	Spain men's national junior ice hockey team	Mexico men's national junior ice hockey team	South Africa men's national junior ice hockey team
4	Spain	2	2	0	0	10	4	+6	4		4–2	6–2
5	Mexico	2	1	0	1	9	5	+4	2	2–4		7–1
6	South Africa	2	0	0	2	3	13	−10	0	2–6	1–7	

Source: IIHF.net at the Wayback Machine
Legend: Blue = home team win; Yellow = draw; Red = away team win.

=== 7th–9th place group ===
Pos	Team	Pld	W	D	L	GF	GA	GD	Pts	Bulgaria men's national junior ice hockey team	Iceland men's national junior ice hockey team	Turkey men's national junior ice hockey team
7	Bulgaria	2	2	0	0	21	2	+19	4		9–2	12–0
8	Iceland	2	1	0	1	18	9	+9	2	2–9		16–0
9	Turkey	2	0	0	2	0	28	−28	0	0–12	0–16	

Source: IIHF.net at the Wayback Machine
Legend: Blue = home team win; Yellow = draw; Red = away team win.
