= Rico Fata =

Canadian ice hockey player (born 1980)

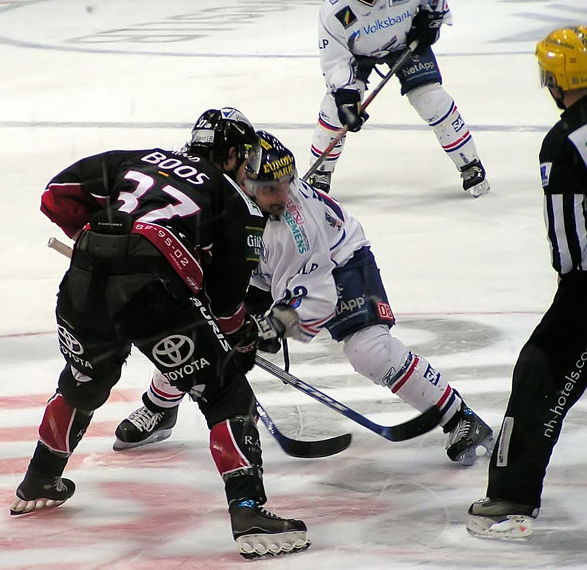
- Born: February 12, 1980 (age 46) Sault Ste. Marie, Ontario, Canada
- Height: 6 ft 0 in (183 cm)
- Weight: 205 lb (93 kg; 14 st 9 lb)
- Position: Right wing
- Shot: Left
- Played for: Calgary Flames; New York Rangers; Pittsburgh Penguins; Atlanta Thrashers; Washington Capitals; Adler Mannheim; EHC Biel; Genève-Servette HC; HIFK
- NHL draft: 6th overall, 1998; Calgary Flames
- Playing career: 1999–2014

Rico Fata (born February 12, 1980) is a Canadian former professional ice hockey player. He played for the Calgary Flames, New York Rangers, Pittsburgh Penguins, Atlanta Thrashers and Washington Capitals of the National Hockey League (NHL).

== Playing career ==
As a youth, Fata played in the 1994 Quebec International Pee-Wee Hockey Tournament with a minor ice hockey team from Sault Ste. Marie, Ontario.

Fata's career started as a 15-year-old, when he played for his hometown Sault Ste. Marie Greyhounds of the Ontario Hockey League (OHL). In the 1996 OHL Entry Draft, Fata was selected first overall by the last place London Knights. In his three seasons in London, the team became a contender, reaching the OHL Finals in 1999, but losing in seven games to the Belleville Bulls.

Rico Fata was drafted in the first round, sixth overall by the Calgary Flames in the 1998 NHL entry draft. Despite his high draft position, he was not able to maintain a spot in the Flames lineup and mostly played in the American Hockey League (AHL). He won the Calder Cup with the Saint John Flames in 2001. He was placed on waivers by Calgary and was claimed by the New York Rangers. He spent one and a half seasons with the Rangers before going to the Pittsburgh Penguins in an eight–player trade. On January 31, 2006, the Atlanta Thrashers claimed him off waivers from the Penguins. On March 9, 2006, the Washington Capitals claimed him off waivers from the Thrashers. He played 10 games at the start of the 2006–07 NHL season with Washington before being waived through the league.

On November 8, 2006 Fata signed a contract with the Adler Mannheim of the Deutsche Eishockey Liga (DEL). On September 8, 2008 he signed a contract with the EHC Biel. On August 1, 2011 he signed a one-year contract with the Genève-Servette HC of the Swiss National League A, with an option for one more year.

On June 17, 2013, after five seasons in the NLA, Fata left to sign a one-year contract with Finnish club, HIFK of the SM-liiga.

== Career statistics ==
=== Regular season and playoffs ===
			Regular season					Playoffs
Season	Team	League	GP	G	A	Pts	PIM	GP	G	A	Pts	PIM
1995–96	Sault Ste. Marie Greyhounds	OHL	62	11	15	26	52	4	0	0	0	0
1996–97	London Knights	OHL	59	19	34	53	76	—	—	—	—	—
1997–98	London Knights	OHL	64	43	33	76	110	16	9	5	14	49
1998–99	London Knights	OHL	23	15	18	33	41	25	10	12	22	42
1998–99	Calgary Flames	NHL	20	0	1	1	4	—	—	—	—	—
1999–00	Saint John Flames	AHL	76	29	29	58	65	3	0	0	0	4
1999–00	Calgary Flames	NHL	2	0	0	0	0	—	—	—	—	—
2000–01	Saint John Flames	AHL	70	23	29	52	129	19	2	3	5	22
2000–01	Calgary Flames	NHL	5	0	0	0	6	—	—	—	—	—
2001–02	Hartford Wolf Pack	AHL	61	35	36	71	36	10	2	5	7	4
2001–02	New York Rangers	NHL	10	0	0	0	0	—	—	—	—	—
2002–03	Hartford Wolf Pack	AHL	9	8	6	14	6	—	—	—	—	—
2002–03	New York Rangers	NHL	36	2	4	6	6	—	—	—	—	—
2002–03	Pittsburgh Penguins	NHL	27	5	8	13	10	—	—	—	—	—
2003–04	Pittsburgh Penguins	NHL	73	16	18	34	54	—	—	—	—	—
2004–05	HC Asiago	ITA	35	18	20	38	36	10	8	5	13	10
2005–06	Pittsburgh Penguins	NHL	20	0	0	0	10	—	—	—	—	—
2005–06	Wilkes–Barre/Scranton Penguins	AHL	25	8	10	18	39	—	—	—	—	—
2005–06	Atlanta Thrashers	NHL	6	0	1	1	4	—	—	—	—	—
2005–06	Washington Capitals	NHL	21	3	3	6	8	—	—	—	—	—
2006–07	Washington Capitals	NHL	10	1	1	2	2	—	—	—	—	—
2006–07	Adler Mannheim	DEL	29	8	10	18	12	11	2	4	6	8
2007–08	Adler Mannheim	DEL	53	7	14	21	67	5	0	2	2	2
2008–09	EHC Biel	NLA	45	18	19	37	44	—	—	—	—	—
2009–10	EHC Biel	NLA	41	15	16	31	28	—	—	—	—	—
2010–11	EHC Biel	NLA	47	13	21	34	16	—	—	—	—	—
2011–12	Genève–Servette HC	NLA	50	17	16	33	26	—	—	—	—	—
2011–12	Lausanne HC	NLB	1	0	0	0	0	—	—	—	—	—
2012–13	Genève–Servette HC	NLA	41	8	16	24	20	1	0	0	0	2
2013–14	HIFK	Liiga	10	2	1	3	2	—	—	—	—	—
NHL totals			230	27	36	63	104	—	—	—	—	—
AHL totals			241	103	110	213	275	32	4	8	12	30
NLA totals			224	71	88	159	134	1	0	0	0	2

=== International ===
Medal record

Ice hockey

Representing Canada

World Junior Championships
Silver medal – second place	1999 Winnipeg	

Year	Team	Event	Result	GP	G	A	Pts	PIM
1999	Canada	WJC	2nd place, silver medalist(s)	7	1	3	4	8
Junior totals				7	1	3	4	8

== Awards and honours ==
Award	Year
American Hockey League
All-Rookie Team	2000
Second All-Star Team	2002

== Personal life ==
Fata's brother Drew also played professional hockey and played eight games for the New York Islanders.

After retiring as a player, Fata opened the Fast By Fata Hockey School. Fata owns 2 Tim Hortons restaurants in Sault Ste. Marie.

Preceded by Daniel Tkaczuk	Calgary Flames' first-round draft pick 1998	Succeeded by Oleg Saprykin
