= Chubarov =

Chubarov (Russian: Чубаров) is a Slavic masculine surname, its feminine counterpart is Chubarova. Notable people with the surname include:

- Artem Chubarov (born 1979), Russian ice hockey player
- Refat Chubarov (born 1957), Ukrainian politician
