= Simon Gagné =

Canadian ice hockey player (born 1980)

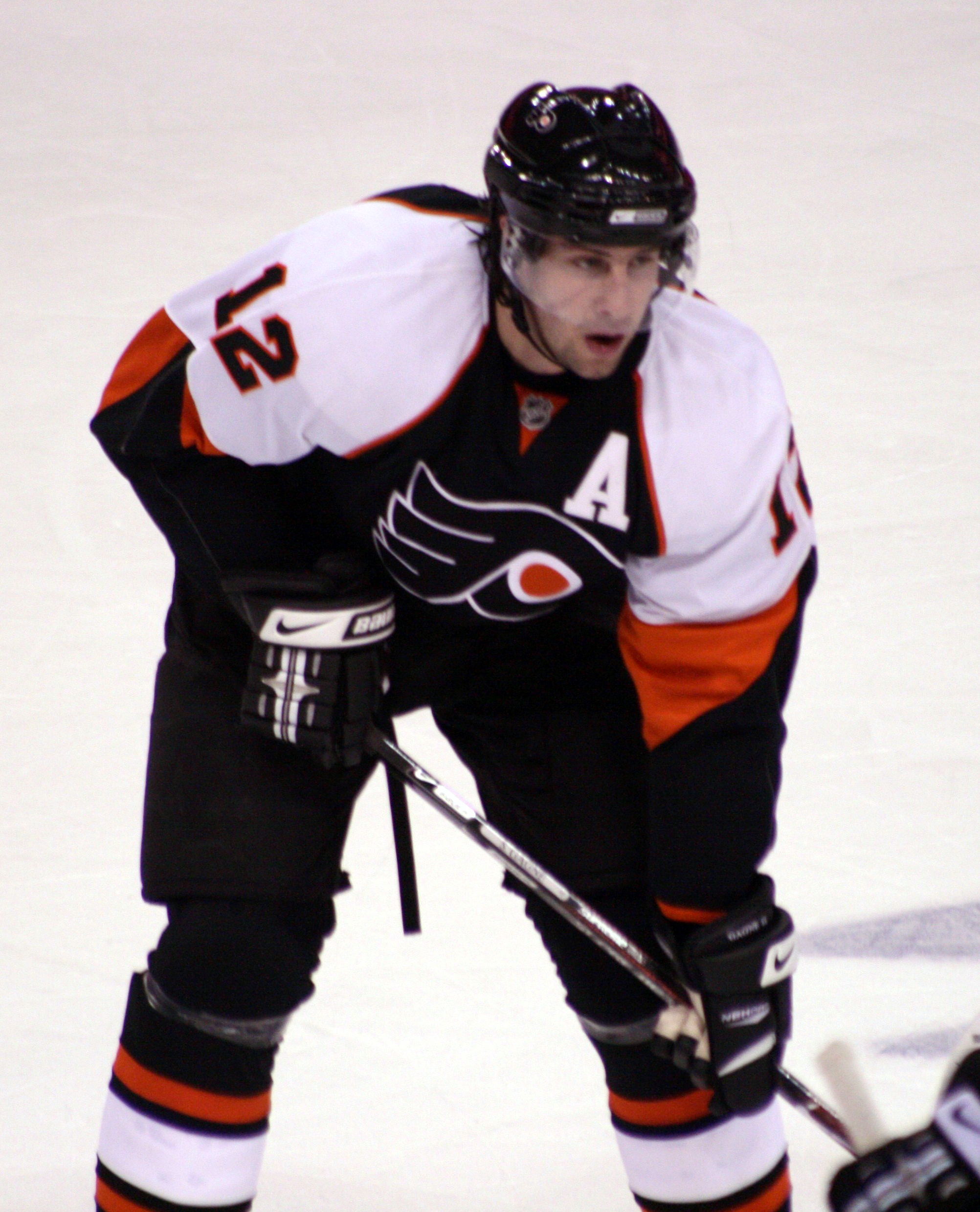
- Gagné with the Philadelphia Flyers in March 2009
- Born: February 29, 1980 (age 46) Sainte-Foy, Quebec, Canada
- Height: 6 ft 1 in (185 cm)
- Weight: 193 lb (88 kg; 13 st 11 lb)
- Position: Left wing
- Shot: Left
- Played for: Philadelphia Flyers; Tampa Bay Lightning; Los Angeles Kings; Boston Bruins
- National team: Canada
- NHL draft: 22nd overall, 1998; Philadelphia Flyers
- Playing career: 1999–2015

Simon Gagné (French pronunciation: [simɔ̃ ɡaɲe]; born February 29, 1980) is a Canadian former professional ice hockey left winger. He played for the Philadelphia Flyers, Tampa Bay Lightning, Los Angeles Kings and Boston Bruins of the National Hockey League (NHL). He spent the first ten seasons of his NHL career with the Flyers (1999–2010), followed by one season with Tampa Bay (2010–11) and two with Los Angeles (2011–13), winning the Stanley Cup in 2012, before returning to Philadelphia via trade for the end of the lockout-shortened 2012–13 season. After not playing in 2013–14, Gagné signed with Boston, briefly playing for them before retiring in 2015.

Drafted out of the Quebec Major Junior Hockey League (QMJHL) 22nd overall in 1998, Gagné played major junior with the Beauport Harfangs and Quebec Remparts for three seasons. He began his NHL career with the Flyers in 1999 and was named to the NHL All-Rookie Team. He has appeared in two NHL All-Star Games and has won two Bobby Clarke Trophies with the Flyers as team MVP.

Internationally, Gagné has represented Canada on five occasions. He has won silver medals at the 1999 World Junior Championships and 2005 World Championships, while winning gold at the 2002 Winter Olympics and a World Cup championship in 2004.

He was named general manager of the Quebec Remparts of the QMJHL on June 15, 2023, replacing Patrick Roy.

== Playing career ==
As a youth, Gagné played in the 1993 and 1994 Quebec International Pee-Wee Hockey Tournaments with a minor ice hockey team from Sainte-Foy, Quebec City.

=== QMJHL ===
Gagné was 16 when he broke into the QMJHL as a member of the Beauport Harfangs during the 1996–97 season. Playing mostly on the third and fourth lines, Gagné finished with 31 points (9 goals and 22 assists) in 51 games. The following two seasons, he would play with the Quebec Remparts, totalling 189 points (80 goals and 109 assists) in 114 games, including a 120-point season in 1998–99. That year, he finished sixth in league scoring, was named to the QMJHL Second All-Star Team and was awarded the Paul Dumont Trophy as the "personality of the year". Gagné also recorded 20 goals and 13 assists for 33 points in 25 career playoff matches with the Remparts. After the 1998–99 season, Gagné graduated to the pro ranks, and the Remparts retired Gagné's #12 jersey during a ceremony early on in the 2001–02 season. Gagné joined Hockey Hall of Famer Guy Lafleur as the only two players that have had their jerseys retired by the Quebec Remparts (Alexander Radulov's number has also since been retired by the Remparts).

=== Philadelphia Flyers (1999–2010) ===
Gagné was drafted 22nd overall by the Philadelphia Flyers in the 1998 NHL entry draft and made the Flyers out of training camp prior to the 1999–2000 season. His rookie season saw him play primarily at centre and score 20 goals and 28 assists in 80 games, good enough to be named to the NHL All-Rookie Team. He contributed 5 goals and 5 assists in 17 games during the playoffs before the Flyers lost in seven games to the New Jersey Devils in the Eastern Conference Finals.

The following season, Gagné was converted from centre to wing. Playing on a line with Mark Recchi and Keith Primeau in the 2000–01 season, Gagné scored 27 goals and 32 assists in 69 games and took part in his first NHL All-Star Game. During the All-Star Game, he scored two goals including the game-winning goal for the North American team. 2001–02 saw him score 33 goals and tally a career high 33 assists in 79 games. A nagging groin injury limited Gagné to 46 games and career lows in goals, assists and points in 2002–03. The next season, Gagné recorded 24 goals and 21 assists in 80 games. He also scored an important overtime goal in game six of the Eastern Conference Finals against the Tampa Bay Lightning. However, the Flyers were eliminated in game seven.

Once the 2004–05 NHL lockout came to an end, Gagné assumed a greater role on the Flyers and played most of the year as the left winger on the top line with Peter Forsberg and Mike Knuble. The line became known as the "Deuces Wild" line due to their numbers (12 [Gagné], 21 [Forsberg] and 22 [Knuble]) and Gagné responded with his best season as a pro with 47 goals and 79 points in 72 games. He was awarded the Bobby Clarke Trophy, which is awarded to the Flyers Team MVP. In the off-season, Gagné signed a five-year contract extension worth over $25 million. Despite not having Forsberg as his centre for much of the 2006–07 season due to injury and Forsberg's eventual trade to the Nashville Predators, Gagné scored 41 goals and 27 assists in 76 games and won his second consecutive Bobby Clarke Trophy. He also played in his second NHL All-Star Game.

In the 2007–08 season, Gagné recorded 18 points in 25 games before being shut down for the year on February 20 after being told to sit out by doctors. Although it was believed Gagné had suffered three concussions in five months, he was told by doctors that he only had one and further injuries re-aggravated the symptoms. He suffered the initial concussion on October 25, 2007, when he was hit in the jaw with a check from Florida Panthers defenceman Jay Bouwmeester. Gagné sat out four games and returned only to be hurt again on November 7. After missing the next 26 games, he was re-injured on his first shift back on February 10, 2008, against the Pittsburgh Penguins. Gagné follows after several previous Flyers player who have suffered serious concussions. Former captain Keith Primeau had his career ended prematurely due to concussions suffered while playing in Philadelphia, while Jeremy Roenick nearly retired after suffering one himself.

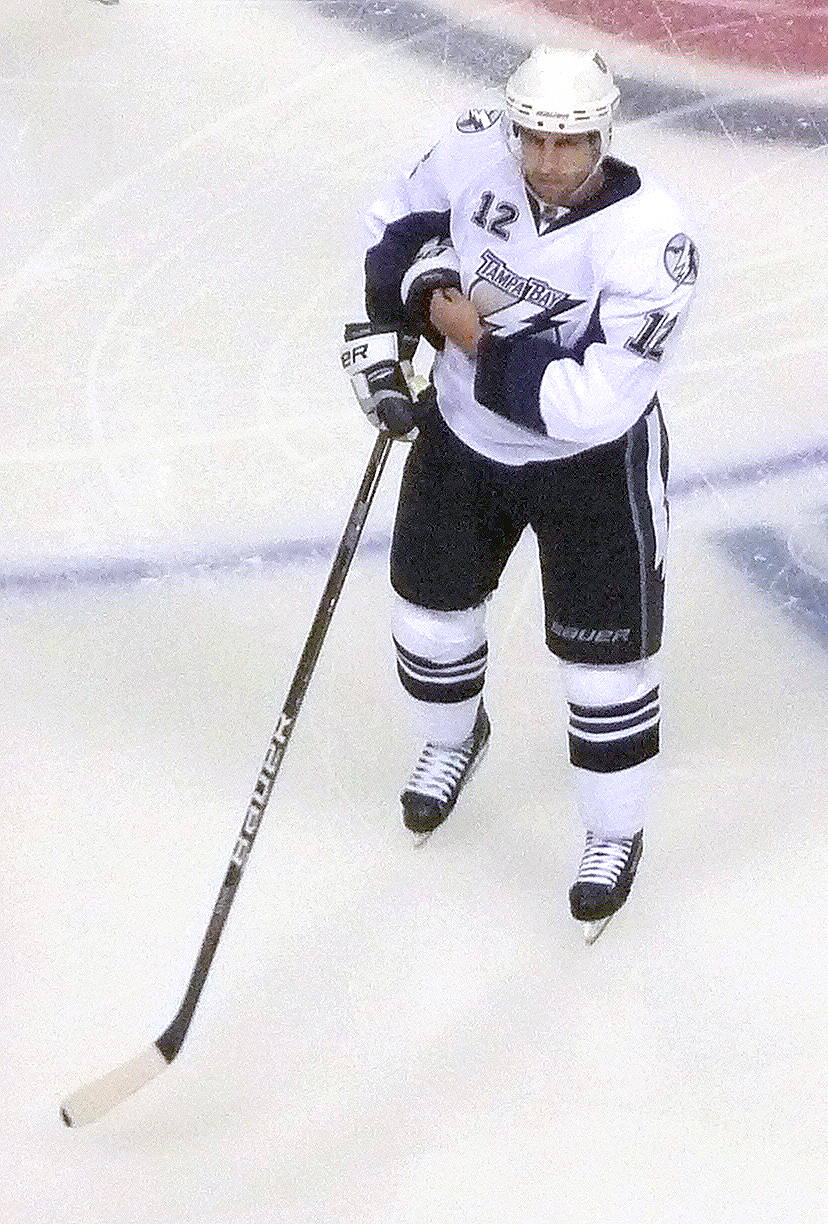
Gagné with the Tampa Bay Lightning in October 2010.

Gagné had a strong return in the 2008–09 season, scoring 34 goals, 74 points and posting a +21 in 79 games. However, injury troubles persisted in 2009–10. Less than a month into the season, he was placed on the injured reserve after being diagnosed with a double hernia in his groin in late-October 2009. Although the Flyers' orthopedic surgeon recommended surgery, Gagné opted for a second opinion with his personal doctor in Montreal. Soon after, Gagné opted for surgery, which was performed on November 3. The surgery repaired the two small hernias in his right groin laparoscopically through his belly button, while reinforcing his rectus abdominis on both sides. Gagné returned to action on December 19 against the New York Rangers after missing 24 games. He scored his third career hat trick and first career natural hat-trick just 11 days after returning from injury against the Rangers, December 30, 2009. He finished the season with 40 points in 58 games. After defeating the second-seeded New Jersey Devils in the opening round of the 2010 playoffs, in which Gagné was injured, the Flyers met the Boston Bruins in the second round. After going down three games to none in the series without Gagné, Gagné returned for game four, scoring the game-winning goal in overtime, then scoring two goals in game five. After the Flyers became just the sixth team to force a game seven after being down three games to none, Gagné scored the series-winning goal in the third period of game seven to advance to the Eastern Conference Finals. The Flyers became the third team in NHL history to come back from a three games to none deficit in a series and win.

=== Tampa Bay Lightning (2010–2011) ===
On July 19, 2010, Gagné was traded to the Tampa Bay Lightning in exchange for Matt Walker and a fourth-round pick in the 2011 NHL entry draft. He recorded 17 goals with 23 assists for the Lightning that year as the Lightning finished as the fifth seed in the East putting them in the playoffs for the first time since 2007, to go with another five goals in the 2011 playoffs as the Lightning defeated the Pittsburgh Penguins in seven games (erasing a 3–1 series deficit in doing so) in the first round and sweeping the top-seeded Washington Capitals in the second round before falling in the third round to the eventual Stanley Cup champion Boston Bruins in seven games, one win short from returning to the Stanley Cup Final.

=== Los Angeles Kings (2011–2013) ===
After just one season in Tampa Bay, Gagné became an unrestricted free agent. On July 2, 2011, he signed a two-year, $7 million contract with the Los Angeles Kings. He scored his first goal as a Kings player on October 13, 2011, against Martin Brodeur of the New Jersey Devils. During the regular season, he appeared in 34 games and scored 10 goals with 17 points overall. On June 11, 2012, he won the Stanley Cup over the Devils, along with former Flyers teammates Jeff Carter and Mike Richards. During the Kings' playoff run, he appeared in four games but did not record a point. During the off-season, he underwent surgery to remove a 5 cm mass from his neck which had been causing him chronic pain.

=== Return to Philadelphia (2013) ===
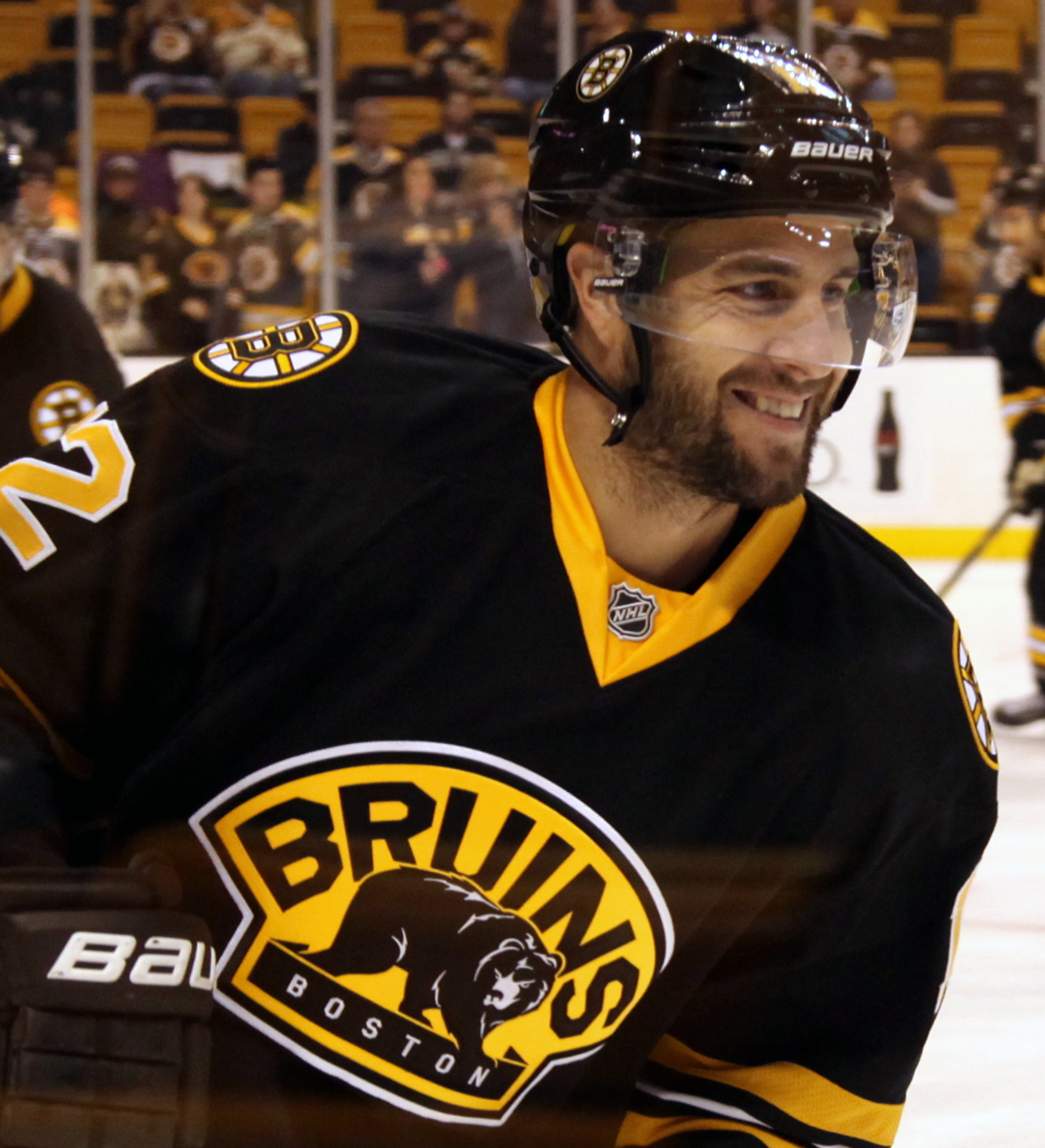
Gagné with the Boston Bruins in October 2014.

In the following 2012–13 lockout-shortened season, Gagné sparingly appeared in 11 games with the Kings before on February 26, 2013, he was traded back to Philadelphia in exchange for a conditional fourth-round draft pick. He appeared in his return to Philadelphia the following night at the Wells Fargo Center, February 27, 2013, against the Washington Capitals. In his first game back, Gagné registered his first goal of the season on a power play, assisted by Brayden Schenn and Daniel Brière, ending a 32-game goalless streak, the longest of his professional career.

=== Boston Bruins (2014–2015) ===
After a year hiatus from professional hockey, Gagné signed a professional try-out contract with the Boston Bruins. After a successful training camp, Gagné was signed to a one-year contract with them on October 14, 2014. After scoring 3 goals in 23 games, it was announced on January 12, 2015, that Gagné would not return to the Bruins in the 2014–15 season after his father's death in December 2014. In a possible signal of the end of his professional career, Gagné's contract was terminated by the Bruins on January 29, 2015. On September 15, 2015, Gagné announced his retirement from professional hockey.

== Personal life ==
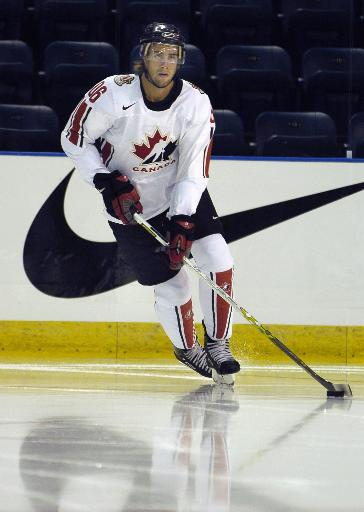
- Gagné represented Canada internationally on five different occasions.

Medal record

Representing Canada

Men's ice hockey

World Championships
| Silver medal – second place | 2005 Austria | |

World Cup
| Gold medal – first place | 2004 Canada | |

Winter Olympics
| Gold medal – first place | 2002 Salt Lake City | |

World Junior Championships
| Silver medal – second place | 1999 Canada | |

Simon is married to Karine and has a son, Matthew, born June 2, 2009, and a daughter, Lily Rose, born February 14, 2011.

== International play ==
Gagné debuted internationally with Team Canada at the 1999 World Junior Championships in Manitoba. Playing as the host country, Canada made it to the gold medal game against Russia, but lost in overtime to earn the silver medal. Gagné scored seven goals and an assist in seven games to finish second in team scoring behind Daniel Tkaczuk's 10 points.

Three years later, Gagné made his senior debut with Team Canada at the 2002 Winter Olympics in Salt Lake City, scoring four points in six games to help Canada to their first Olympic ice hockey gold medal in 50 years over the host country United States.

Prior to the 2004–05 NHL lockout, Gagné competed in the 2004 World Cup, where he captured his second consecutive international championship with Team Canada, contributing two points in six games. Due to the Philadelphia Flyers' consistent playoff runs in the NHL, Gagné did not appear in a World Championships until 2005, with the NHL lockout still in effect. He finished the tournament with an international career-high ten points in nine games, third in team scoring behind Rick Nash and Joe Thornton as the three Canadians finished 1–2–3 in tournament scoring. However, as Canada made it to the gold medal game, they were shut-out by the Czech Republic 3–0.

The following year, Gagné was named to his second national Olympic team to compete at the 2006 Winter Olympics in Turin. Attempting to defend their gold medal from 2002, Canada was defeated in the quarter-finals by Russia and finished in seventh place. Gagné scored three points in five games.

He was named to the 2009 summer camp roster for the 2010 Winter Olympics in Vancouver. On August 25, 2009, Gagné injured his groin and was forced to leave camp.

== Career statistics ==
=== Regular season and playoffs ===
| | | | Regular season | | | | | Playoffs |
| Season | Team | League | GP | G | A | Pts | PIM | GP | G | A | Pts | PIM |
|---|---|---|---|---|---|---|---|---|---|---|---|---|
| 1995–96 | Sainte-Foy Gouverneurs | QMAAA | 27 | 13 | 9 | 22 | 18 | 15 | 7 | 8 | 15 | 8 |
| 1996–97 | Beauport Harfangs | QMJHL | 51 | 9 | 22 | 31 | 39 | — | — | — | — | — |
| 1997–98 | Quebec Remparts | QMJHL | 53 | 30 | 39 | 69 | 26 | 12 | 11 | 5 | 16 | 23 |
| 1998–99 | Quebec Remparts | QMJHL | 61 | 50 | 70 | 120 | 42 | 13 | 9 | 8 | 17 | 4 |
| 1999–2000 | Philadelphia Flyers | NHL | 80 | 20 | 28 | 48 | 22 | 17 | 5 | 5 | 10 | 2 |
| 2000–01 | Philadelphia Flyers | NHL | 69 | 27 | 32 | 59 | 18 | 6 | 3 | 0 | 3 | 0 |
| 2001–02 | Philadelphia Flyers | NHL | 79 | 33 | 33 | 66 | 32 | 5 | 0 | 0 | 0 | 2 |
| 2002–03 | Philadelphia Flyers | NHL | 46 | 9 | 18 | 27 | 16 | 13 | 4 | 1 | 5 | 6 |
| 2003–04 | Philadelphia Flyers | NHL | 80 | 24 | 21 | 45 | 29 | 18 | 5 | 4 | 9 | 12 |
| 2005–06 | Philadelphia Flyers | NHL | 72 | 47 | 32 | 79 | 46 | 6 | 3 | 1 | 4 | 2 |
| 2006–07 | Philadelphia Flyers | NHL | 76 | 41 | 27 | 68 | 30 | — | — | — | — | — |
| 2007–08 | Philadelphia Flyers | NHL | 25 | 7 | 11 | 18 | 4 | — | — | — | — | — |
| 2008–09 | Philadelphia Flyers | NHL | 79 | 34 | 40 | 74 | 42 | 6 | 3 | 1 | 4 | 2 |
| 2009–10 | Philadelphia Flyers | NHL | 58 | 17 | 23 | 40 | 47 | 19 | 9 | 3 | 12 | 0 |
| 2010–11 | Tampa Bay Lightning | NHL | 63 | 17 | 23 | 40 | 20 | 15 | 5 | 7 | 12 | 4 |
| 2011–12 | Los Angeles Kings | NHL | 34 | 7 | 10 | 17 | 18 | 4 | 0 | 0 | 0 | 2 |
| 2012–13 | Los Angeles Kings | NHL | 11 | 0 | 5 | 5 | 2 | — | — | — | — | — |
| 2012–13 | Philadelphia Flyers | NHL | 27 | 5 | 6 | 11 | 6 | — | — | — | — | — |
| 2014–15 | Boston Bruins | NHL | 23 | 3 | 1 | 4 | 4 | — | — | — | — | — |
| NHL totals | | | 822 | 291 | 310 | 601 | 328 | 109 | 37 | 22 | 59 | 32 |

=== International ===
| Year | Team | Event | GP | G | A | Pts | PIM |
|---|---|---|---|---|---|---|---|
| 1999 | Canada | WJC | 7 | 7 | 1 | 8 | 2 |
| 2002 | Canada | OG | 6 | 1 | 3 | 4 | 0 |
| 2004 | Canada | WCH | 6 | 1 | 1 | 2 | 0 |
| 2005 | Canada | WC | 9 | 3 | 7 | 10 | 0 |
| 2006 | Canada | OG | 5 | 1 | 2 | 3 | 4 |
| Junior totals | | | 7 | 7 | 1 | 8 | 2 |
| Senior totals | | | 26 | 6 | 13 | 19 | 4 |

=== All-Star Games ===
| Year | Location | G | A | P |
|---|---|---|---|---|
| 2001 | Colorado | 2 | 0 | 2 |
| 2007 | Dallas | 0 | 0 | 0 |
| All-Star totals | | 2 | 0 | 2 |

== Awards ==
- Named to the QMJHL Second All-Star Team in 1998–99.
- Named to the NHL All Rookie Team in 1999–2000.
- Played in the NHL All-Star Game in 2001 and 2007.
- Won the Pelle Lindbergh Memorial (Philadelphia Flyers' most improved player) in 2000–01.
- Won the Toyota Cup (Philadelphia Flyers' most three stars selections) in 2001–02, 2005–06 and 2006–07.
- Won the Bobby Clarke Trophy (Philadelphia Flyers' MVP) in 2005–06 and 2006–07.
- Won the Stanley Cup in 2012 with the Los Angeles Kings.
- Goal against the Washington Capitals in his first game back as a Flyer voted by fans as the team's "Play of the Year" during the 2012–13 season.

| Preceded by Dainius Zubrus | Philadelphia Flyers' first-round draft pick 1998 | Succeeded by Maxime Ouellet |
| Preceded by Mark Recchi | Winner of the Bobby Clarke Trophy; 2006, 2007 | Succeeded by Mike Richards |
