= Timo Koskela =

Finnish ice hockey player

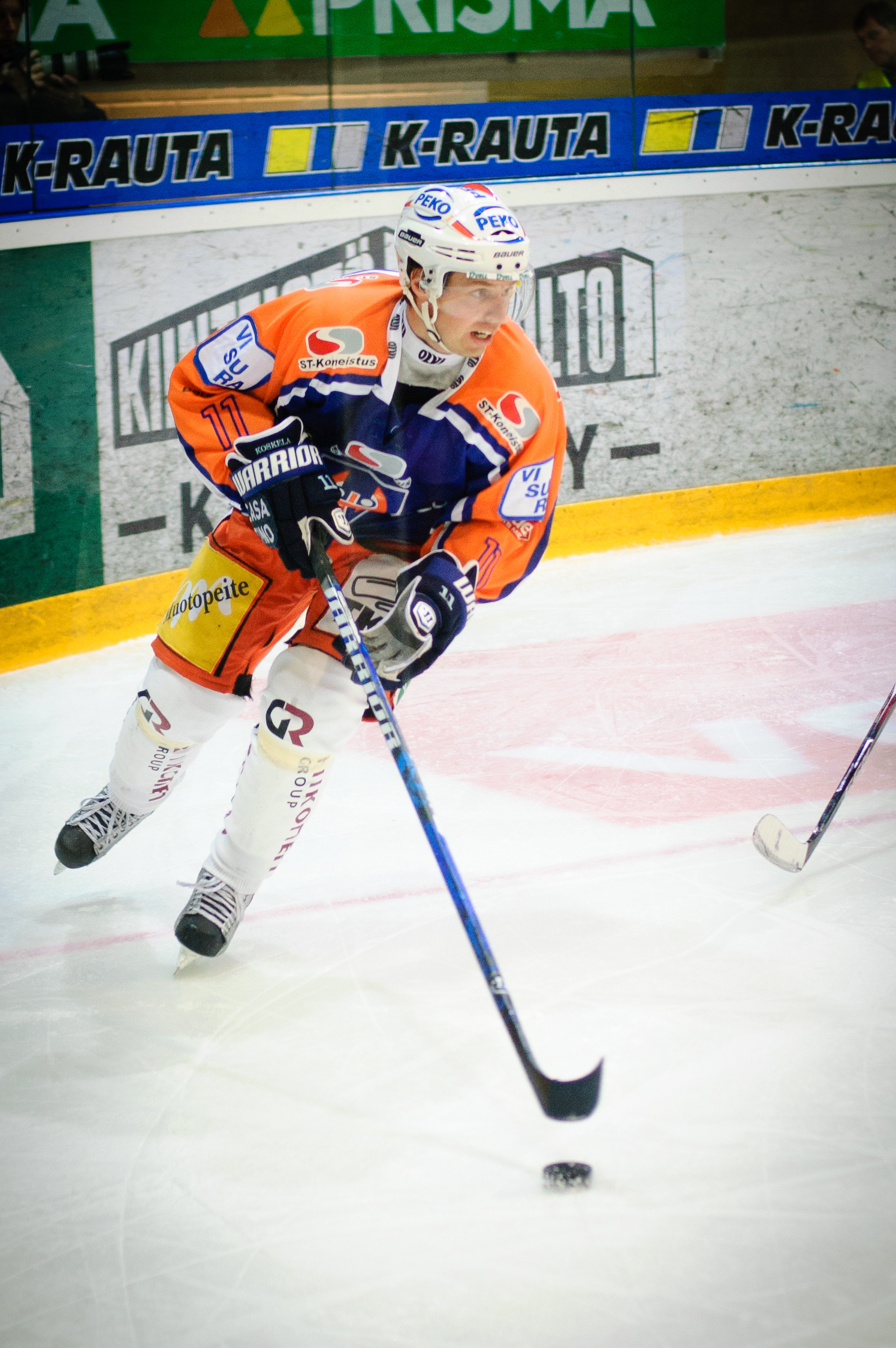
- Born: January 23, 1979 (age 46) Tampere, Finland
- Height: 5 ft 11 in (180 cm)
- Weight: 179 lb (81 kg; 12 st 11 lb)
- Position: Right wing
- Shot: Left
- NLB team Former teams: GCK Lions: Tappara
- Playing career: 1997–2013

Timo Koskela (born January 23, 1979) is a Finnish former professional ice hockey player.

He last played in Switzerland for GCK Lions of the National League B during the 2012-13 season. He also used to play for Tappara of the SM-liiga.

== Career statistics ==
| | | | Regular season | | | | | Playoffs |
| Season | Team | League | GP | G | A | Pts | PIM | GP | G | A | Pts | PIM |
|---|---|---|---|---|---|---|---|---|---|---|---|---|
| 1993–94 | Tappara U16 | U16 SM-sarja | 2 | 1 | 0 | 1 | 0 | — | — | — | — | — |
| 1994–95 | Tappara U16 | U16 SM-sarja | 32 | 35 | 43 | 78 | 20 | 5 | 4 | 6 | 10 | 4 |
| 1995–96 | Tappara U18 | U18 SM-sarja | 31 | 22 | 26 | 48 | 28 | 6 | 2 | 5 | 7 | 2 |
| 1996–97 | HPK U18 | U18 SM-sarja | 14 | 18 | 25 | 43 | 39 | — | — | — | — | — |
| 1996–97 | HPK U20 | U20 SM-liiga | 32 | 17 | 24 | 41 | 8 | 6 | 3 | 0 | 3 | 0 |
| 1996–97 | HPK | SM-liiga | 1 | 0 | 0 | 0 | 0 | — | — | — | — | — |
| 1997–98 | HPK U20 | U20 SM-liiga | 35 | 14 | 36 | 50 | 44 | — | — | — | — | — |
| 1997–98 | HPK | SM-liiga | 10 | 1 | 0 | 1 | 0 | — | — | — | — | — |
| 1997–98 | Kokkolan Hermes | I-Divisioona | 3 | 1 | 1 | 2 | 0 | — | — | — | — | — |
| 1998–99 | HPK U20 | U20 SM-liiga | 5 | 2 | 2 | 4 | 8 | — | — | — | — | — |
| 1998–99 | HPK | SM-liiga | 14 | 0 | 0 | 0 | 0 | 1 | 0 | 0 | 0 | 0 |
| 1998–99 | Ahmat Hyvinkää | I-Divisioona | 10 | 1 | 5 | 6 | 0 | — | — | — | — | — |
| 1998–99 | Kokkolan Hermes | I-Divisioona | 4 | 0 | 4 | 4 | 2 | — | — | — | — | — |
| 1999–00 | Piteå HC | Allsvenskan | 32 | 10 | 19 | 29 | 28 | — | — | — | — | — |
| 1999–00 | Ilves | SM-liiga | 19 | 3 | 2 | 5 | 29 | 3 | 0 | 0 | 0 | 2 |
| 2000–01 | Ilves | SM-liiga | 51 | 6 | 5 | 11 | 20 | 6 | 0 | 0 | 0 | 0 |
| 2000–01 | KOOVEE | Suomi-sarja | 1 | 0 | 1 | 1 | 0 | — | — | — | — | — |
| 2001–02 | Ilves | SM-liiga | 14 | 0 | 1 | 1 | 10 | — | — | — | — | — |
| 2001–02 | FPS | Mestis | 7 | 4 | 5 | 9 | 2 | — | — | — | — | — |
| 2001–02 | Porin Ässät | SM-liiga | 1 | 0 | 0 | 0 | 0 | — | — | — | — | — |
| 2001–02 | Herning Blue Fox | Denmark | 20 | 10 | 15 | 25 | 10 | 12 | 8 | 9 | 17 | — |
| 2002–03 | Herning Blue Fox | Denmark | 27 | 16 | 23 | 39 | 40 | 14 | 0 | 18 | 18 | 14 |
| 2003–04 | Herning Blue Fox | Denmark | 36 | 18 | 22 | 40 | 50 | 13 | 5 | 7 | 12 | — |
| 2004–05 | Herning Blue Fox | Denmark | 36 | 16 | 33 | 49 | 41 | 16 | 8 | 11 | 19 | 8 |
| 2005–06 | Herning Blue Fox | Denmark | 29 | 17 | 27 | 44 | 20 | 13 | 3 | 9 | 12 | 18 |
| 2006–07 | KalPa | SM-liiga | 56 | 11 | 30 | 41 | 34 | — | — | — | — | — |
| 2007–08 | Tappara | SM-liiga | 56 | 20 | 33 | 53 | 42 | 11 | 2 | 4 | 6 | 6 |
| 2008–09 | Tappara | SM-liiga | 44 | 12 | 12 | 24 | 26 | — | — | — | — | — |
| 2009–10 | Tappara | SM-liiga | 55 | 11 | 22 | 33 | 34 | 2 | 0 | 1 | 1 | 0 |
| 2010–11 | Tappara | SM-liiga | 57 | 12 | 21 | 33 | 26 | — | — | — | — | — |
| 2011–12 | GC Küsnacht Lions | NLB | 42 | 15 | 27 | 42 | 14 | 5 | 0 | 4 | 4 | 6 |
| 2012–13 | GC Küsnacht Lions | NLB | 18 | 3 | 14 | 17 | 16 | — | — | — | — | — |
| SM-liiga totals | | | 378 | 76 | 126 | 202 | 221 | 23 | 2 | 5 | 7 | 8 |
| Denmark totals | | | 148 | 77 | 120 | 197 | 161 | 68 | 24 | 54 | 78 | 40 |
