= Juha Gustafsson =

Finnish ice hockey player (born 1979)

- Born: April 24, 1979 (age 47) Helsinki, Finland
- Height: 6 ft 4 in (193 cm)
- Weight: 198 lb (90 kg; 14 st 2 lb)
- Position: Defence
- Shot: Left
- Swe. 3rd team Former teams: Tingsryd AIF; Espoo Blues; Tappara; Sport Ghiaccio Pontebba
- NHL draft: 43rd overall, 1997; Phoenix Coyotes
- Playing career: 1999–2012

Juha Gustafsson (born April 24, 1979) is a Finnish former ice hockey player.

== Career ==
He joined Tingsryd AIF in the Swedish 3rd division in September 2009. He came to Sport Ghiaccio Pontebba from Espoo Blues of the Finnish SM-liiga in January 2009. In season 1999–2000 Gustafsson won the Euro Hockey Tour with Team Finland. In 2007, he won the Tampere Cup. He was drafted 43rd overall by the Phoenix Coyotes in the 1997 NHL entry draft.

== Career statistics ==
| | | | Regular season | | | | | Playoffs |
| Season | Team | League | GP | G | A | Pts | PIM | GP | G | A | Pts | PIM |
|---|---|---|---|---|---|---|---|---|---|---|---|---|
| 1994–95 | Kiekko-Espoo U18 Ch | U18 SM-sarja | 24 | 1 | 4 | 5 | 26 | — | — | — | — | — |
| 1994–95 | Kiekko-Espoo U20 | U20 SM-liiga | 2 | 0 | 0 | 0 | 0 | 4 | 0 | 0 | 0 | 4 |
| 1995–96 | Kiekko-Espoo U18 Ch | U18 SM-sarja | 10 | 1 | 3 | 4 | 10 | — | — | — | — | — |
| 1995–96 | Kiekko-Espoo U20 | U20 SM-liiga | 33 | 1 | 5 | 6 | 28 | 4 | 0 | 0 | 0 | 2 |
| 1995–96 | Kiekko-Espoo | SM-liiga | 1 | 0 | 0 | 0 | 0 | — | — | — | — | — |
| 1996–97 | Kiekko-Espoo U18 Ch | U18 SM-sarja | 7 | 2 | 0 | 2 | 6 | — | — | — | — | — |
| 1996–97 | Kiekko-Espoo U20 | U20 SM-liiga | 32 | 1 | 3 | 4 | 30 | — | — | — | — | — |
| 1996–97 | Kiekko-Espoo | SM-liiga | 3 | 0 | 0 | 0 | 0 | 3 | 0 | 0 | 0 | 0 |
| 1997–98 | Kiekko-Espoo U20 | U20 SM-liiga | 33 | 3 | 3 | 6 | 18 | 5 | 0 | 1 | 1 | 2 |
| 1997–98 | Kiekko-Espoo | SM-liiga | 2 | 0 | 0 | 0 | 0 | — | — | — | — | — |
| 1998–99 | Espoo Blues | SM-liiga | 4 | 0 | 1 | 1 | 2 | — | — | — | — | — |
| 1998–99 | Ahmat Hyvinkää | I-Divisioona | 37 | 3 | 7 | 10 | 36 | — | — | — | — | — |
| 1999–00 | Espoo Blues | SM-liiga | 33 | 1 | 4 | 5 | 26 | — | — | — | — | — |
| 2000–01 | Espoo Blues | SM-liiga | 46 | 1 | 2 | 3 | 34 | — | — | — | — | — |
| 2000–01 | Haukat | Mestis | 6 | 2 | 1 | 3 | 4 | — | — | — | — | — |
| 2001–02 | Espoo Blues | SM-liiga | 53 | 1 | 3 | 4 | 46 | 3 | 1 | 0 | 1 | 6 |
| 2002–03 | Espoo Blues | SM-liiga | 49 | 2 | 1 | 3 | 48 | 7 | 0 | 0 | 0 | 4 |
| 2003–04 | Tappara | SM-liiga | 55 | 3 | 5 | 8 | 58 | 3 | 0 | 0 | 0 | 6 |
| 2004–05 | Tappara | SM-liiga | 55 | 1 | 3 | 4 | 52 | 5 | 0 | 0 | 0 | 0 |
| 2005–06 | Espoo Blues | SM-liiga | 56 | 0 | 2 | 2 | 68 | 9 | 0 | 1 | 1 | 12 |
| 2006–07 | Espoo Blues | SM-liiga | 55 | 1 | 4 | 5 | 42 | 9 | 0 | 0 | 0 | 8 |
| 2007–08 | Espoo Blues | SM-liiga | 25 | 1 | 2 | 3 | 10 | 9 | 0 | 0 | 0 | 2 |
| 2007–08 | HC Salamat | Mestis | 9 | 4 | 3 | 7 | 6 | — | — | — | — | — |
| 2007–08 | Kiekko-Vantaa | Mestis | 5 | 0 | 2 | 2 | 4 | — | — | — | — | — |
| 2007–08 | HPK | SM-liiga | 5 | 1 | 0 | 1 | 4 | — | — | — | — | — |
| 2008–09 | Espoo Blues | SM-liiga | 9 | 0 | 0 | 0 | 4 | — | — | — | — | — |
| 2008–09 | SG Pontebba | Italy | 21 | 1 | 5 | 6 | 14 | — | — | — | — | — |
| 2009–10 | Tingsryds AIF | Division 1 | 39 | 0 | 2 | 2 | 55 | 10 | 0 | 1 | 1 | 4 |
| 2010–11 | Tingsryds AIF | HockeyAllsvenskan | 43 | 1 | 0 | 1 | 10 | 8 | 1 | 0 | 1 | 2 |
| 2011–12 | Kristianstads IK | Division 1 | 41 | 1 | 5 | 6 | 26 | — | — | — | — | — |
| SM-liiga totals | | | 451 | 12 | 27 | 39 | 394 | 48 | 1 | 1 | 2 | 38 |
