= Mikhail Donika =

Russian ice hockey player (born 1979)

- Born: May 15, 1979 (age 47) Yaroslavl, Russia
- Height: 6 ft 0 in (183 cm)
- Weight: 185 lb (84 kg; 13 st 3 lb)
- Position: Defence
- Shot: Left
- Played for: Torpedo Yaroslavl; Dynamo Moscow; Amur Khabarovsk; Spartak Moscow; Molot-Prikamye Perm; Sibir Novosibirsk; Torpedo Nizhny Novgorod; Lada Togliatti
- NHL draft: 272nd overall, 1999; Dallas Stars
- Playing career: 1996–2015

Mikhail Georgievich Donika (Russian: Михаил Георгиевич Доника; born May 15, 1979) is a Russian ice hockey defenceman. He was drafted in the 9th round, 272nd overall by the Dallas Stars in the 1999 NHL entry draft, the last selection of that year's draft.

== Professional play ==
Donika played professional hockey in Russia for Torpedo Yaroslavl of the Russian Superleague starting in 1997. He was not drafted by a National Hockey League (NHL) team in his first year of eligibility, but in 1999, he was selected by the Dallas Stars with the last overall pick in the ninth round (272nd overall) of the 1999 NHL Draft. Donika did not play professional hockey in North America at any level, instead playing in Russia, Belarus and Kazakhstan.

As well as Torpedo Yaroslavl, Donika played in the RSL for Dynamo Moscow, Amur Khabarovsk, Spartak Moscow, Molot-Prikamye Perm, HC Sibir Novosibirsk, Torpedo Nizhny Novgorod and Lada Togliatti.

== International play ==
Donika represented Russia in international competition at the junior level. He played in three consecutive world junior tournaments, playing in 20 games total, and recording three assists. At the 1997 World Junior Championships, he helped Russia capture the bronze medal. In 1998, Russia lost to Finland in overtime during the gold medal game, settling for silver. The 1999 World Junior Championship was Donika's last year of junior eligibility. At the tournament in Winnipeg, Manitoba, Donika and his Russian teammates captured the gold medal by defeating Canada in overtime. With the victory, Donika and his teammate Roman Lyashenko became the only two players in the history of the World Junior Championships to capture gold, silver and bronze medals.
