= Daniel Tkaczuk =

Canadian ice hockey player and coach

- Born: June 10, 1979 (age 47) Toronto, Ontario, Canada
- Height: 6 ft 1 in (185 cm)
- Weight: 189 lb (86 kg; 13 st 7 lb)
- Position: Centre
- Shot: Left
- Played for: Calgary Flames; Lukko; HC Milano; ERC Ingolstadt; Füchse Duisburg; Nottingham Panthers
- National team: Canada
- NHL draft: 6th overall, 1997; Calgary Flames
- Playing career: 1999–2011

Daniel Tkaczuk (born June 10, 1979) is a Canadian ice hockey coach and former centre who played 19 games in the National Hockey League for the Calgary Flames. He served as an associate coach of the Springfield Thunderbirds of the American Hockey League, before being promoted to interim head coach for the remainder of the 2023–24 AHL season. As of November 2024, he is currently serving as a Performance Coach consultant with the Toronto Sceptres in the PWHL.

== Playing career ==
Tkaczuk was born in Toronto, Ontario. As a youth, he played in the 1993 Quebec International Pee-Wee Hockey Tournament with Toronto Marlboros minor ice hockey team.

He was selected sixth overall in the 1997 NHL Entry Draft by the Calgary Flames. He represented Canada at the 1999 World Junior Ice Hockey Championships, where he won a silver medal and led the team in scoring. Tkaczuk was named to the American Hockey League's All-Rookie Team the following season. He played in the National Hockey League for the Calgary Flames during the 2001–02 campaign but suffered a severe concussion in a game against the Arizona Coyotes during his 19th game. He returned to the minors and never saw NHL action again.

Tkaczuk left the Flames system at the end of 2000–01 after winning the Calder Cup when traded along with Fred Brathwaite, Sergei Varlamov, and a 2001 ninth-round pick to the St. Louis Blues for goaltender Roman Turek on June 23, 2001. He would then play two more years in the AHL for the Worcester IceCats and after being released by the St. Louis Blues, for the Bridgeport Sound Tigers.

Unhappy with his shaky status in the minors, he tried his luck in Europe, spending the 2003–04 season with Lukko of Finland's major league, the SM-liiga, where his numbers were respectable, but not impressive enough to earn him a significant profile in Finland.

Tkaczuk then turned to Milan, the highest-paying club in the Italian league, where he enjoyed considerable success, maintaining his preeminence even during the 2004–05 season when the squad was strengthened by the arrival of NHL players during the NHL lockout. He led Milan in goals (23), assists (33), and points (56) during the regular season and playoffs, good enough for third place overall in Serie A scoring. Thanks to those solid numbers, Tkaczuk was one of three Milan players, along with defenceman Marc Savard and veteran forward Ryan Savoia, named to Team Canada's roster for the 2004 Loto Cup in Slovakia. Milan went on to win the national title, their fourth in a row, defeating Cortina in the finals.

In the late summer of 2005, Tkaczuk held talks with Krefeld Pinguine of the Deutsche Eishockey Liga (DEL), Grand Rapids Griffins of the American Hockey League, and Lada Togliatti of the Russian Super League before eventually returning to Milan.

In 2006, Tkaczuk signed for ERC Ingolstadt of the DEL. In 2007, he moved to EV Duisburg Die Füchse and played there until the completion of the 2008–09 season. Tkaczuk was second in goals during the 2007–08 season (17).

After six years abroad, Tkaczuk returned to North America and signed with the Charlotte Checkers of the ECHL on November 13, 2009. He would later be loaned to the Rochester Americans on December 7, 2009. On January 6, 2010, the Hartford Wolf Pack signed Tkaczuk to a professional tryout (PTO) contract. Tkaczuk finished the season with 45 points in 46 games for the Checkers.

In the following season, Tkaczuk signed a one-year contract with the EC TREND-Dornbirn of the second-tier Austrian National League on September 16, 2010 After scoring 33 points in 26 games with Trend, Tkaczuk signed for the Nottingham Panthers of the Elite Ice Hockey League (EIHL) in the United Kingdom, on January 19, 2011.

== Coaching career ==
After retiring, he became an assistant coach with the Owen Sound Attack and the Kitchener Rangers of the OHL. He then became assistant coach of the American Hockey League's Chicago Wolves in 2016 before spending the 2017–18 season as skills coach with the St. Louis Blues. In 2018, he became an assistant coach for the Blues' AHL affiliate the San Antonio Rampage.

== Personal ==
Tkaczuk is the president of iHockeyTrainer.com, an online hockey school for training and skill development. He is also a columnist for The Hockey News, often providing insight from a player's perspective. He is married and has two sons.

== Career statistics ==
=== Regular season and playoffs ===
			Regular season					Playoffs
Season	Team	League	GP	G	A	Pts	PIM	GP	G	A	Pts	PIM
1994–95	Mississauga Reps AAA	GTHL	53	65	66	131	20	—	—	—	—	—
1995–96	Barrie Colts	OHL	61	22	39	61	38	7	1	2	3	8
1996–97	Barrie Colts	OHL	62	45	48	93	49	9	7	2	9	2
1997–98	Barrie Colts	OHL	57	35	40	75	38	6	2	3	5	8
1998–99	Barrie Colts	OHL	58	43	62	105	58	12	7	8	15	10
1999–2000	Saint John Flames	AHL	80	25	41	66	56	3	0	0	0	0
2000–01	Calgary Flames	NHL	19	4	7	11	14	—	—	—	—	—
2000–01	Saint John Flames	AHL	50	15	21	36	48	14	10	9	19	4
2001–02	Worcester IceCats	AHL	75	10	27	37	37	3	1	1	2	2
2002–03	Bridgeport Sound Tigers	AHL	69	9	18	27	44	9	3	7	10	18
2003–04	Lukko	SM-l	36	7	11	18	16	4	0	0	0	18
2004–05	Milano Vipers	ITA	34	24	35	59	34	13	6	10	16	18
2005–06	Milano Vipers	ITA	34	14	33	47	63	7	6	4	10	12
2006–07	ERC Ingolstadt	DEL	48	9	23	32	36	6	1	4	5	16
2007–08	Füchse Duisburg	DEL	44	17	16	33	54	—	—	—	—	—
2008–09	Füchse Duisburg	DEL	37	3	8	11	34	—	—	—	—	—
2009–10	Charlotte Checkers	ECHL	46	11	34	45	18	4	4	1	5	2
2009–10	Syracuse Crunch	AHL	3	0	0	0	2	—	—	—	—	—
2009–10	Rochester Americans	AHL	7	0	2	2	4	—	—	—	—	—
2009–10	Hartford Wolf Pack	AHL	2	0	0	0	0	—	—	—	—	—
2010–11	Dornbirner EC	AUT.2	26	16	17	33	65	—	—	—	—	—
2011–12	Nottingham Panthers	GBR	6	2	4	6	8	4	0	5	5	6
AHL totals			286	59	109	168	191	29	14	17	31	24
NHL totals			19	4	7	11	14	—	—	—	—	—
DEL totals			129	29	47	76	124	6	1	4	5	16

=== International ===
Daniel Tkaczuk
Medal record

Representing Canada

Ice hockey

World Junior Championships
Silver medal – second place	1999 Winnipeg	

Year	Team	Event	GP	G	A	Pts	PIM
1998	Canada	WJC	7	2	1	3	4
1999	Canada	WJC	7	6	4	10	10
Junior totals			14	8	5	13	14

Preceded by Derek Morris	Calgary Flames' first-round draft pick 1997	Succeeded by Rico Fata
