= Adam Mair =

Canadian ice hockey player

- Born: February 15, 1979 (age 47) Hamilton, Ontario, Canada
- Height: 6 ft 2 in (188 cm)
- Weight: 215 lb (98 kg; 15 st 5 lb)
- Position: Right wing
- Shot: Right
- Played for: Toronto Maple Leafs; Los Angeles Kings; Buffalo Sabres; New Jersey Devils
- NHL draft: 84th overall, 1997; Toronto Maple Leafs
- Playing career: 1999–2012

Adam Mair (born February 15, 1979) is a Canadian former professional ice hockey centre who played in the National Hockey League (NHL) with the Toronto Maple Leafs, Los Angeles Kings, Buffalo Sabres and the New Jersey Devils. He was a player development coach for the Buffalo Sabres until October 2025 when he was charged with felony DWI for driving with his children in a car while intoxicated during a traffic accident in September 2025.

== Playing career ==
Mair was drafted 84th overall by the Toronto Maple Leafs in the 1997 NHL entry draft. He joined the Maple Leafs for five games in the 1999 Stanley Cup Playoffs, recording a goal and 14 penalty minutes. However, he spent the majority of the 1999–2000 season in the AHL with the St. John's Maple Leafs. The Leafs traded Mair at the Trade Deadline in 2001, acquiring defenseman Aki Berg from the Los Angeles Kings.

Mair split time in the 2001–02 season between the AHL and NHL, and was hurt for a good amount of the season. In a December 20, 2001, game against the Ottawa Senators, Mair was assessed 47 penalty minutes after he left the Kings bench to join a fight that had broken out between the two teams behind Kings goaltender Felix Potvin. As the two teams fought, Mair's teammate Mikko Eloranta squared off with Senator's enforcer Chris Neil. Seeing that Eloranta was at an obvious disadvantage, Mair left the Kings bench and tackled Neil. The next day it was announced that Mair had received an automatic 10-game suspension for leaving the bench to join a fight. The Kings decided to trade Mair to the Buffalo Sabres on July 24, in exchange for former first round draft pick Erik Rasmussen. Mair became a popular player, with his effort and his aggression.

Mair set a personal high in games played and assists and tied a personal record in goals in 2003–04. His 2005–06 season was plagued by concussions. He missed a total of 31 regular season games due to concussion symptoms after a collision with Tyson Nash of the Phoenix Coyotes on January 12, 2006. He missed the remainder of the 2006 regular season, as well as the first two rounds of the playoffs, and did not appear for his first playoff game until game five of the third round versus the Carolina Hurricanes. Mair was named an alternate captain on February 4, 2008, under the Sabres 2007–08 rotating captains and alternate captains system.

On November 9, 2009, the Buffalo Sabres placed Adam Mair on waivers. The 24-hour deadline passed with no team claiming Mair. The Sabres did have the option of sending him to the AHL Portland Pirates, but head coach Lindy Ruff decided to keep him up with the Sabres instead.

On September 17, 2010, Mair was invited by the New Jersey Devils on a tryout contract for the team, he eventually signed with New Jersey on October 12, 2010.

After his final professional season with the Springfield Falcons of the AHL in 2011–12, Mair announced his retirement and accepted the role of Director of Player Development at Canisius College on October 22, 2012.

== Coaching career ==
On June 17, 2015, Mair was hired by the Buffalo Sabres as a player development coach.

On September 11, 2025, Mair was put on administrative leave by the Sabres after it was discovered that he had been arrested on drunk driving charges a week prior.

== Career statistics ==
=== Regular season and playoffs ===
			Regular season					Playoffs
Season	Team	League	GP	G	A	Pts	PIM	GP	G	A	Pts	PIM
1995–96	Owen Sound Platers	OHL	62	12	15	27	63	6	0	0	0	2
1996–97	Owen Sound Platers	OHL	65	16	35	51	113	4	1	0	1	2
1997–98	Owen Sound Platers	OHL	56	25	27	52	179	11	6	3	9	31
1998–99	Owen Sound Platers	OHL	43	23	41	64	109	16	10	10	20	47
1998–99	Toronto Maple Leafs	NHL	—	—	—	—	—	5	1	0	1	14
1998–99	St. John's Maple Leafs	AHL	—	—	—	—	—	3	1	0	1	6
1999–00	St. John's Maple Leafs	AHL	62	22	27	49	124	—	—	—	—	—
2000–01	St. John's Maple Leafs	AHL	47	18	27	45	69	—	—	—	—	—
2000–01	Toronto Maple Leafs	NHL	16	0	2	2	14	—	—	—	—	—
2000–01	Los Angeles Kings	NHL	10	0	0	0	6	—	—	—	—	—
2001–02	Manchester Monarchs	AHL	27	10	9	19	48	5	5	1	6	10
2001–02	Los Angeles Kings	NHL	18	1	1	2	57	—	—	—	—	—
2002–03	Buffalo Sabres	NHL	79	6	11	17	146	—	—	—	—	—
2003–04	Buffalo Sabres	NHL	81	6	14	20	146	—	—	—	—	—
2005–06	Buffalo Sabres	NHL	40	2	5	7	47	3	0	0	0	0
2006–07	Buffalo Sabres	NHL	82	2	9	11	128	16	1	4	5	10
2007–08	Buffalo Sabres	NHL	72	5	12	17	66	—	—	—	—	—
2008–09	Buffalo Sabres	NHL	75	8	11	19	95	—	—	—	—	—
2009–10	Buffalo Sabres	NHL	69	6	8	14	73	6	1	1	2	4
2010–11	New Jersey Devils	NHL	65	1	3	4	45	—	—	—	—	—
2011–12	Springfield Falcons	AHL	32	3	4	7	58	—	—	—	—	—
NHL totals			615	38	76	114	829	35	3	5	8	36

Medal record

Men's ice hockey

Representing Canada

World Junior Championships
Silver medal – second place	1999 Winnipeg	

=== International ===
Year	Team	Comp	GP	G	A	Pts	PIM
1999	Canada	WJC	7	1	1	2	29
Junior int'l totals			7	1	1	2	29
