= Roman Lyashenko =

Russian ice hockey player (1979–2003)

- Born: May 2, 1979 Murmansk, Soviet Union
- Died: July 5, 2003 (aged 24) Antalya, Turkey
- Height: 6 ft 0 in (183 cm)
- Weight: 189 lb (86 kg; 13 st 7 lb)
- Position: Centre
- Shot: Right
- Played for: Torpedo Yaroslavl; Dallas Stars; New York Rangers
- National team: Russia
- NHL draft: 52nd overall, 1997; Dallas Stars
- Playing career: 1995–2003

Roman Yurievich Lyashenko (Russian: Роман Юрьевич Ляшенко; May 2, 1979 – July 5, 2003) was a Russian ice hockey player. He played professionally in North America for the Dallas Stars and New York Rangers of the National Hockey League (NHL) from 1999 to 2002, and also spent time with affiliate teams in the American Hockey League (Utah Grizzlies and Hartford Wolfpack) and the now-defunct International Hockey League (Michigan K-Wings). Lyashenko also played professionally in Russia for Torpedo Yaroslavl before joining the Stars. He was drafted by the Stars in the second round (52nd overall) of the 1997 NHL entry draft.

Lyashenko represented Russia internationally at both the junior and senior levels, capturing three medals (gold, silver and bronze) at the World Junior Championships and a silver medal at the World Championships. Lyashenko committed suicide while on vacation with his family on July 5, 2003.

== Playing career ==
Lyashenko spent three seasons playing with Torpedo Yaroslavl in his home country of Russia. In 130 games, he recorded 22 goals and 22 assists for 44 points. While playing with Yaroslavl, he was selected in the second round (52nd overall) of the 1997 NHL entry draft by the Dallas Stars. Leading up to the draft, scouts described him as a defensive forward with good character and leadership skills. He was considered an atypical Russian prospect due to his attention to defensive play. One source had him ranked as a first round prospect. He signed with the Stars in July 1999.

Lyashenko made his NHL debut with the Dallas Stars during the 1999–2000 season, seeing action in 58 games, while recording six goals and six assists. He also spent time with the Stars' International Hockey League (IHL) affiliate Michigan K-Wings, notching five points in nine games. During his rookie season in the NHL, Lyashenko played center on the Stars second line, earning praise from coach Ken Hitchcock, "His game has risen beyond his years. He's 20 years old in age only. He looks like a real good fit for us." The Stars went to the Stanley Cup Final that season, but lost to the New Jersey Devils. In the Stars' first round playoff series against the Edmonton Oilers, Lyashenko scored the winning goal in the first game of the series. During the 2000 Western Conference final against the Colorado Avalanche, Lyashenko scored the series clinching goal in game seven. Lyashenko played in 16 playoff games for the Stars. During the playoffs in his rookie season, Hitchcock was happy with Lyashenko's play, saying, "He's an exceptional defensive player – his offensive skills have improved as the season's gone on."

During the 2000–2001 season, Lyashenko again split time between the Stars and the Utah Grizzlies, who were the Stars' new IHL affiliate. At the end of the season, Lyashenko had played 60 games with the Stars and recorded nine points. At the IHL level, he played in six games and had one assist. Lyashenko was popular with his teammates in Dallas, at one point his teammates lobbied Hitchcock to get him more playing time.

On March 12, 2002, Lyashenko and Martin Ručinský were traded to the New York Rangers for Manny Malhotra and Barrett Heisten. During the 2001–2002 season, Lyashenko played for four different teams, the Stars and Rangers at the NHL level as well as the IHL's Grizzlies, and the Hartford Wolfpack of the American Hockey League (AHL). In his last season of professional hockey, Lyashenko played two games with the Rangers, and 71 with the Wolfpack. He put up the best numbers of his career in North America, with 23 goals and 35 assists. He played in the 2003 AHL All-Star Game, despite having asked for a release midway through the season to return to Russia. The request was denied by the Rangers, but his agent, Todd Diamond, said there were other teams interested in the forward's services; "Several teams were interested in him because they knew he wasn't a fourth-line guy."

== International play ==
Medal record

Representing Russia

Ice hockey

World Junior Championships
| Bronze medal – third place | 1997 Geneva | |
| Silver medal – second place | 1998 Helsinki | |
| Gold medal – first place | 1999 Winnipeg | |

World Championships
| Silver medal – second place | 2002 Gothenburg | |

Lyashenko represented Russia internationally at both the junior and senior levels. His first experience with Russia's junior team was at the 1997 World Junior Championships, recording three points in six games as Russia defeated the Czech Republic for the bronze medal. At the 1998 World Junior championships, Lyashenko again represented Russia, as the team captured a silver medal. In seven games at the tournament, he recorded three assists. Lyashenko captained Russia's team at the 1999 World Junior Championships, which were held in Winnipeg. The Russian team captured the gold medal, defeating Canada in overtime. Lyashenko scored three goals and added two assists in seven games. With the gold medal, Lyashenko and teammate Mikhail Donika became the only two players to win a medal of each colour (gold, silver and bronze) at the World Junior Ice Hockey Championships.

Lyashenko played in a single tournament at the senior international level, representing Russia at the 2002 World Championships. He left his AHL team, the Hartford Wolf Pack, during their playoff run to join Russia at the tournament. Wolf Pack general manager Al Coates was disappointed to lose Lyashenko from his club, but understood the decision: "Everyone wants to play for his country, and he shouldn't be portrayed as a bad guy. He's a good guy and a good player." In nine games, he recorded two assists and 14 penalty minutes. Russia captured a silver medal at the tournament after a shocking loss to Slovakia in the final.

== Death ==
While on vacation in Antalya, Turkey, with his mother and sister, Lyashenko was found dead in his hotel room the morning of July 6, 2003. His death was initially reported to be a suicide. Reports by Turkish police confirmed this, stating that Lyashenko had left a suicide note and attempted to cut his arms and wrists before hanging himself. A Turkish police officer, speaking anonymously, said that Lyashenko apologized for killing himself in the note. New York Rangers general manager Glen Sather said of Lyashenko, "Roman was a quality individual who had a positive impact on everyone he touched, both on and off the ice." Dallas Stars general manager Doug Armstrong expressed similar sentiments: "Roman was a quality young man who we were privileged to have in our organization for three years." Lyashenko was buried in Yaroslavl on July 12, 2003.

== Career statistics ==
=== Regular season and playoffs ===
| | | | Regular season | | | | | Playoffs |
| Season | Team | League | GP | G | A | Pts | PIM | GP | G | A | Pts | PIM |
|---|---|---|---|---|---|---|---|---|---|---|---|---|
| 1995–96 | Torpedo Yaroslavl-2 | RUS-2 | 52 | 6 | 4 | 10 | 12 | — | — | — | — | — |
| 1996–97 | Torpedo Yaroslavl | RSL | 42 | 5 | 7 | 12 | 16 | 9 | 3 | 0 | 3 | 6 |
| 1996–97 | Torpedo Yaroslavl-2 | RUS-3 | 2 | 1 | 1 | 2 | 0 | — | — | — | — | — |
| 1997–98 | Torpedo Yaroslavl | RSL | 46 | 7 | 6 | 13 | 28 | 7 | 2 | 0 | 2 | 14 |
| 1998–99 | Torpedo Yaroslavl | RSL | 42 | 10 | 9 | 19 | 51 | 9 | 0 | 4 | 4 | 8 |
| 1999–00 | Dallas Stars | NHL | 58 | 6 | 6 | 12 | 10 | 16 | 2 | 1 | 3 | 0 |
| 1999–00 | Michigan K-Wings | IHL | 9 | 3 | 2 | 5 | 8 | — | — | — | — | — |
| 2000–01 | Dallas Stars | NHL | 60 | 6 | 3 | 9 | 45 | 1 | 0 | 0 | 0 | 0 |
| 2000–01 | Utah Grizzlies | IHL | 6 | 0 | 1 | 1 | 2 | — | — | — | — | — |
| 2001–02 | Dallas Stars | NHL | 4 | 0 | 0 | 0 | 0 | — | — | — | — | — |
| 2001–02 | New York Rangers | NHL | 15 | 2 | 0 | 2 | 0 | — | — | — | — | — |
| 2001–02 | Utah Grizzlies | AHL | 58 | 11 | 25 | 36 | 37 | — | — | — | — | — |
| 2001–02 | Hartford Wolf Pack | AHL | — | — | — | — | — | 4 | 1 | 1 | 2 | 2 |
| 2002–03 | New York Rangers | NHL | 2 | 0 | 0 | 0 | 0 | — | — | — | — | — |
| 2002–03 | Hartford Wolf Pack | AHL | 71 | 23 | 35 | 58 | 44 | 2 | 1 | 1 | 2 | 0 |
| RSL totals | | | 130 | 22 | 22 | 44 | 95 | 25 | 5 | 4 | 9 | 28 |
| NHL totals | | | 139 | 14 | 9 | 23 | 55 | 17 | 2 | 1 | 3 | 0 |

=== International ===
| Year | Team | Event | GP | G | A | Pts | PIM |
|---|---|---|---|---|---|---|---|
| 1997 | Russia | EJC | 6 | 4 | 2 | 6 | 8 |
| 1997 | Russia | WJC | 6 | 1 | 2 | 3 | 4 |
| 1998 | Russia | WJC | 7 | 0 | 3 | 3 | 6 |
| 1999 | Russia | WJC | 7 | 3 | 2 | 5 | 0 |
| 2002 | Russia | WC | 9 | 0 | 2 | 2 | 14 |
| Junior totals | | | 20 | 4 | 7 | 11 | 10 |
| Senior totals | | | 9 | 0 | 2 | 2 | 14 |

== See also ==
- List of ice hockey players who died during their playing careers
