= 2017 Viterra Championship =

- Host city: Portage la Prairie, Manitoba
- Arena: Stride Place
- Dates: February 8–12
- Winner: Team McEwen
- Curling club: Fort Rouge CC, Winnipeg
- Skip: Mike McEwen
- Third: B. J. Neufeld
- Second: Matt Wozniak
- Lead: Denni Neufeld
- Alternate: Jon Mead
- Finalist: Reid Carruthers

The 2017 Viterra Championship, Manitoba's provincial men's curling championship, was held from February 8 to 12 at the Stride Place in Portage la Priarie. The winning team represented Manitoba at the 2017 Tim Hortons Brier in St. John's, Newfoundland and Labrador.

== Teams ==
Teams are as follows:

Skip	Third	Second	Lead	Alternate	Club
Rob Atkins	Curtis Atkins	Nick Curtis	Trevor Grenkow	Justin Twiss	Granite
Ray Baker	Rae Kujanpaa	Wes Jonasson	Sheldon Oshanyk	Terron Stykalo	Dauphin
Travis Bale	Kelly Fordyce	Ian Fordyce	Nigel Milnes	Evan Martin	East St. Paul
David Bohn	Justin Richter	Tyler Forrest	Bryce McEwen		Assiniboine Memorial
Dennis Bohn	Neil Kitching	Kennedy Bird	Daniel Hunt		Assiniboine Memorial
Braden Calvert	Kyle Kurz	Lucas Van Den Bosch	Brendan Wilson		Deer Lodge
Reid Carruthers	Braeden Moskowy	Derek Samagalski	Colin Hodgson		West St. Paul
Matt Dunstone	Alex Forrest	Ian McMillan	Connor Njegovan		Deer Lodge
Wayne Ewasko	Randal Thomas	Dave Beaudoin	Gord Stelmack		Lorette
Rob Fisher	Jason Yates	Mike Csversko	Lawson Yates	Roger Parker	Dauphin
Hayden Forrester	Brennan Sampson	Brett MacDonald	Cole Chandler	Andrew Clapham	Fort Rouge
Kyle Foster	Shawn Magnusson	Bryan Galbraith	Justin Reischek	Kyle Einarson	Arborg
Graham Freeman	Kevin Barkley	Cory Barkley	Dwayne Barkley	Brooks Freeman	Virden
Travis Graham	Grant Brown	Shaun Kennedy	Jeff Ziemanski		Burntwood
Sean Grassie	Andrew Irving	Geoff Lang	Ryan Hlatkey		Fort Rouge
Jason Gunnlaugson	Colton Lott	Kyle Doering	Rob Gordon		Granite
Steve Irwin	Travis Taylor	Travis Brooks	Travis Saban	Tyler Waterhouse	Brandon
Trevor Loreth	Brad Haight	Ryan Lowdon	Brett Cawson	Stu Gresham	Granite
William Lyburn	Richard Daneault	Jared Kolomaya	Braden Zawada	Jim Coleman	Granite
Kelly Marnoch	Joey Witherspoon	Branden Jorgensen	Chris Cameron	Rob Van Kommer	Carberry
Mike McEwen	B. J. Neufeld	Matt Wozniak	Denni Neufeld	Jon Mead	Fort Rouge
Taylor McIntyre	Connor McIntyre	Riley Smith	Jared Hancox		Pembina
Greg Mikolajek	Ian Harkness	Brent Harder	Dean Nero	Pat Carson	Fort Rouge
Richard Muntain	Nathan Asham	Brad Van Walleghem	Rodney Legault	Mike McCaughan	Pinawa
Randy Neufeld	Dean Moxham	Peter Nicholls	Dale Michie	Brett Moxham	Portage
Derek Oryniak	Darren Oryniak	Al Purdy	A. J. Girardin	Weston Oryniak	Granite
Shaun Parsons	Kevin Parsons	Bronston Jonasson	Jim Davidson		Burntwood
Steve Pauls	Clare Reimer	Kevin Friesen	Dylan Reimer	Russell Pauls	Clearwater
Daley Peters	Corey Chambers	Kody Janzen	Stu Shiells	Julien Leduc	East St. Paul
Jim Renwick	Ray McPhail	Greg Rabe	Harvey Heise	Bill Sutherland	Brandon
Howard Restall	Dave Hardy	Bob Boughey	Houg Holmes		Fort Rouge
JT Ryan	Jacques Gauthier	Graham McFarlane	Brendan Bilawka	Kyle Allenby	Assiniboine Memorial

== Knockout Brackets ==
32 team double knockout with playoff round
Four teams qualify each from A Event and B Event

=== A Event ===
First Knockout	Qualifier 1
Kelly Marnoch	7
Steve Irwin	3
Kelly Marnoch	3
Mike McEwen	5
Mike McEwen	8
Greg Mikolajek	2
Mike McEwen	6
Trevor Loreth	2
Steve Pauls	5
Daley Peters	8
Daley Peters	4
Trevor Loreth	6
Trevor Loreth	8
Wayne Ewasko	1

First Knockout	Qualifier 2
Travis Bale	2
Taylor McIntyre	7
Taylor McIntyre	11
Dennis Bohn	4
Dennis Bohn	8
Travis Graham	2
Taylor McIntyre	5
Matt Dunstone	7
Robbie Fisher	1
Matt Dunstone	9
Matt Dunstone	6
Randy Neufeld	2
Randy Neufeld	10
Rob Atkins	3

First Knockout	Qualifier 3
Hayden Forrester	8
JT Ryan	6
Hayden Forrester	1
William Lyburn	7
William Lyburn	8
Jim Renwick	2
William Lyburn	11
Sean Grassie	7
Howard Restall	4
Jason Gunnlaugson	9
Jason Gunnlaugson	5
Sean Grassie	8
Sean Grassie	7
Kyle Foster	4

First Knockout	Qualifier 4
Derek Oryniak	5
Richard Muntain	8
Richard Muntain	2
Reid Carruthers	7
Reid Carruthers	11
Shaun Parsons	1
Reid Carruthers	9
David Bohn	6
Ray Baker	3
David Bohn	6
David Bohn	5
Braden Calvert	4
Braden Calvert	8
Graham Freeman	5

=== B Event ===
Second Knockout	Qualifier 5
Daley Peters	5
Steve Irwin	7	Steve Irwin	8	Trevor Loreth	7
Greg Mikolajek	5	Steve Irwin	6	Steve Irwin	2
Kelly Marnoch	5
Kelly Marnoch	11
Steve Pauls	2	Wayne Ewasko	5
Wayne Ewasko	10

Second Knockout	Qualifier 6
Randy Neufeld	3
Travis Bale	5	Travis Bale	8	Taylor McIntyre	3
Travis Graham	3	Travis Bale	7	Dennis Bohn	5
Dennis Bohn	8
Dennis Bohn	9
Robbie Fisher	4	Robbie Fisher	2
Rob Atkins	3

Second Knockout	Qualifier 7
Jason Gunnlaugson	7
JT Ryan	8	JT Ryan	4	Sean Grassie	3
Jim Renwick	6	Jason Gunnlaugson	8	Jason Gunnlaugson	5
Kyle Foster	4
Hayden Forrester	5
Howard Restall	4	Kyle Foster	7
Kyle Foster	8

Second Knockout	Qualifier 8
Braden Calvert	5
Derek Oryniak	8	Derek Oryniak	8	David Bohn	7
Shaun Parsons	2	Derek Oryniak	7	Derek Oryniak	4
Ray Baker	1
Richard Muntain	5
Ray Baker	8	Ray Baker	7
Graham Freeman	4

== Playoff Brackets ==
8 team double knockout
Four teams qualify into Championship Round

=== A event ===
First Knockout
Q1	Mike McEwen	7
Q6	Dennis Bohn	2
Q2	Matt Dunstone	6
Q5	Trevor Loreth	4

Qualifier 1
Q1	Mike McEwen	7
Q2	Matt Dunstone	2

First Knockout
Q3	William Lyburn	4
Q8	David Bohn	3
Q4	Reid Carruthers	7
Q7	Jason Gunnlaugson	2

Qualifier 2
Q3	William Lyburn	5
Q4	Reid Carruthers	8

=== B event ===
Second Knockout			Qualifier 3
			Q3	William Lyburn	5
Q6	Dennis Bohn	4	Q5	Trevor Loreth	6
Q5	Trevor Loreth	6

Second Knockout			Qualifier 4
			Q2	Matt Dunstone	3
Q8	David Bohn	5	Q7	Jason Gunnlaugson	5
Q7	Jason Gunnlaugson	7

== Championship round ==
Page playoff system
1	Mike McEwen	2
2	Reid Carruthers	4
3	Trevor Loreth	8
4	Jason Gunnlaugson	3

Semifinal
1	Mike McEwen	8
3	Trevor Loreth	2

Final
2	Reid Carruthers	7
1	Mike McEwen	8

=== 1 vs. 2 ===
Saturday, February 11, 6:00 pm

Sheet C	1	2	3	4	5	6	7	8	9	10	Final
Mike McEwen	0	0	0	0	1	0	0	0	1	0	2
Reid Carruthers 🔨	0	0	0	0	0	1	0	2	0	1	4

=== 3 vs. 4 ===
Saturday, February 11, 6:00 pm

Sheet C	1	2	3	4	5	6	7	8	9	10	Final
Trevor Loreth 🔨	0	2	0	3	1	0	1	1	X	X	8
Jason Gunnlaugson	1	0	1	0	0	1	0	0	X	X	3

=== Semifinal ===
Sunday, February 12, 9:00 am

Sheet C	1	2	3	4	5	6	7	8	9	10	Final
Mike McEwen 🔨	3	0	1	1	1	0	2	0	X	X	8
Trevor Loreth	0	0	0	0	0	1	0	1	X	X	2

=== Final ===
Sunday, February 12, 3:00 pm

Sheet C	1	2	3	4	5	6	7	8	9	10	Final
Reid Carruthers 🔨	0	2	0	0	1	0	2	0	1	1	7
Mike McEwen	1	0	1	0	0	2	0	4	0	0	8

2017 Viterra Championship

Mike McEwen
2nd Manitoba Provincial Championship title
