= BDO Centre for the Community =

Recreational facility in Portage la Prairie, Manitoba

- Interactive map of BDO Centre for the Community
- Former names: Portage Centennial Arena (1967-2011)
- Location: 390 1st Street NW; Portage la Prairie, Manitoba
- Coordinates: 49°58′44″N 98°17′31″W
- Owner: City of Portage la Prairie
- Operator: Centennial Community Club, Inc

Construction
- Opened: 1967
- Expanded: 1980

Tenants
- Portage Terriers (MJHL) 1967-2010; Central Plains Capitals (MMHL/MFMHL) 1986-present

Website
- bdocentre.com

The BDO Centre for the Community, more commonly known as the Portage Centennial Arena, is an indoor recreational facility and community centre in the city of Portage la Prairie, Manitoba, Canada.

The Centennial Arena was the city's main ice hockey facility from 1967 to 2010 and was a venue for the 1999 World Junior Ice Hockey Championships. The arena has been the community's secondary indoor recreation facility since the opening of Stride Place in 2010 and since been renamed the BDO Centre.

== History ==
=== 1967-2010 ===
The Portage Centennial Arena was constructed in 1967 and was one of several projects across the country partially funded by the federal government as part of Canada's Centennial celebration. The same year, the Portage Terriers junior "A" hockey team was revived and became one of the arena's major tenants, along with the city's minor hockey teams. The city explored the idea of building a new sports complex to replace the Centennial Arena in the 1970s, however, this project was rejected by local residents. The city then expanded the Centennial Arena in 1980, adding a second indoor rink on the west side of the building.

The east rink, with a maximum capacity of 1,350 and affectionately known by local hockey fans as the "Dog Pound", hosted seven Turnbull Cup (Manitoba Junior Hockey League championship) and five ANAVET Cup series in which the Terriers appeared between 1973 and 2009. The city was one of the several Manitoba communities that co-hosted the 1999 World Junior Ice Hockey Championships with Winnipeg. Russia and the United States both played matches at the Centennial Arena.

=== Current Use ===
The future of the Centennial Arena was uncertain after the city and joined together with the Rural Municipality of Portage la Prairie to build a new state-of-the-art recreational facility, the Portage Credit Union Centre (now Stride Place), which opened in 2010. A group of local residents petitioned Portage la Prairie city council not to decommission the old arena, citing the need for a third indoor rink to accommodate the community's minor hockey and other recreational programs. The city, not willing to provide further funding to the aging arena, agreed to transfer control of the Centennial Arena to the Centennial Community Club Inc. (CCCI), a non-profit organization operated by local volunteers.

Since 2010, CCCI has operated the facility entirely through private fundraising efforts. The naming rights to the Portage Centennial Arena were sold to BDO Canada in 2011, after which it was renamed the BDO Centre for the Community. The older and larger east arena has been converted into a storage shed, while the west arena continues to be used for ice sports.

== Events hosted ==
- 1973 Turnbull Cup Finals
- 1973 ANAVET Cup
- 1973 Abbott Cup
- 1988 Turnbull Cup Finals
- 1990 Turnbull Cup Finals
- 1990 ANAVET Cup
- 1999 World Junior Ice Hockey Championships
- 1999 Safeway Select
- 2003 Safeway Select
- 2005 Turnbull Cup Finals
- 2005 ANAVET Cup
- 2008 Turnbull Cup Finals
- 2008 ANAVET Cup
- 2008 Turnbull Cup Finals
- 2009 ANAVET Cup

== See also ==
- Stride Place
- Portage Terriers
