= Mika Lehto =

Finnish ice hockey goaltender

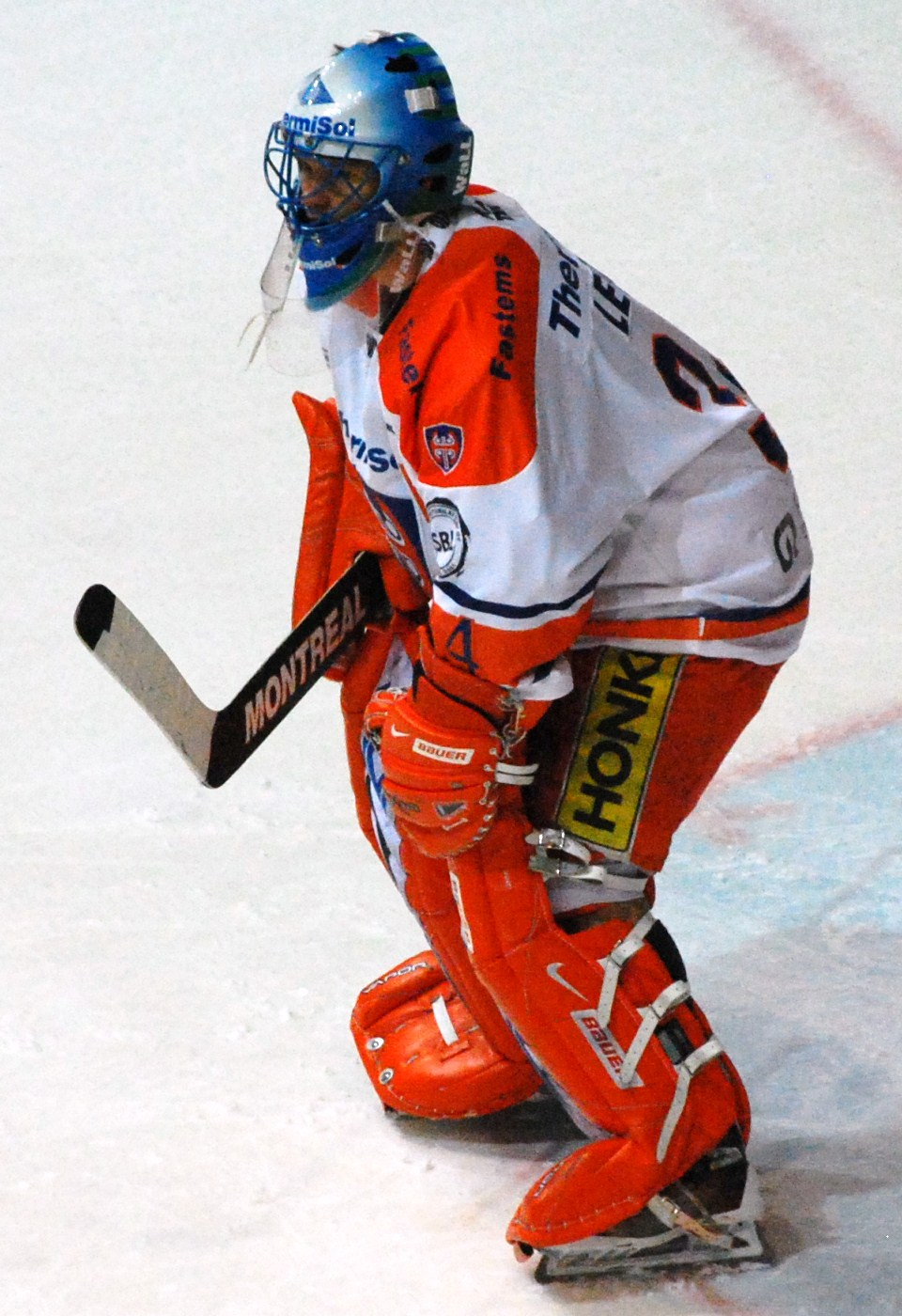
- Born: April 12, 1979 (age 47) Vammala, FIN
- Height: 5 ft 11 in (180 cm)
- Weight: 181 lb (82 kg; 12 st 13 lb)
- Position: Goaltender
- Caught: Left
- Played for: Ässät; JYP; Tappara
- NHL draft: 224th overall, 1998; Pittsburgh Penguins
- Playing career: 1998–2010

Mika Lehto (born April 12, 1979) is a Finnish former professional ice hockey goaltender. He played in the SM-liiga for Ässät, JYP and Tappara. He was drafted 224th overall by the Pittsburgh Penguins in the 1998 NHL entry draft.
