= Martin Čakajík =

Slovak ice hockey player

- Born: December 12, 1979 (age 45); Trenčín, Czechoslovakia
- Height: 5 ft 10 in (178 cm)
- Weight: 190 lb (86 kg; 13 st 8 lb)
- Position: Defence
- Shoots: Left
- PHL team Former teams: GKS Katowice; HK Dukla Trenčín; HC Bílí Tygři Liberec; HC Oceláři Třinec; HC Znojemští Orli; Plzeň HC
- National team: Slovakia
- NHL draft: Undrafted
- Playing career: 1998–present

Martin Čakajík (born December 12, 1979) is a Slovak ice hockey player. He plays for GKS Katowice in the Polska Hokej Liga.

He previously played for HC Dukla Trenčín in his home country, and HC Bílí Tygři Liberec, HC Oceláři Třinec, Plzeň HC, and HC Znojemští Orli in the Czech Republic. A defenceman, he stands 5 ft 10 in (1.78 m) tall.
