= Vlastimil Lakosil =

Czech ice hockey player

- Born: July 4, 1979 (age 47) Uherské Hradiště, Czechoslovakia
- Height: 5 ft 11 in (180 cm)
- Weight: 185 lb (84 kg; 13 st 3 lb)
- Position: Goaltender
- Catches: Left
- EPIHL team Former teams: Hull Pirates; Czech Extraliga; HC Oceláři Třinec; Motor České Budějovice
- NHL draft: Undrafted
- Playing career: 1997–present

Vlastimil Lakosil (born July 4, 1979) is a Czech ice hockey goaltender. He is currently playing with the Hull Pirates of the English Premier Ice Hockey League (EPIHL).

Lakosil made his Czech Extraliga debut with HC Oceláři Třinec during the 1997–98 Czech Extraliga season. He played parts of seven seasons in Třinec. Lakosil then spent the next seven years in the Slovak Extraliga with HK Nitra, Skalica HK 36, and HC České Budějovice.
