= Artem Chubarov =

Russian ice hockey player (born 1979)

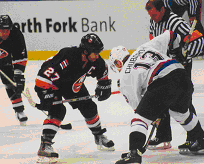
- Chubarov (right) with the Vancouver Canucks in 2003
- Born: December 13, 1979 (age 46) Gorky, Russian SFSR, Soviet Union
- Height: 6 ft 1 in (185 cm)
- Weight: 205 lb (93 kg; 14 st 9 lb)
- Position: Centre
- Shot: Left
- Played for: Torpedo Nizhny Novgorod; Dynamo Moscow; Vancouver Canucks; Avangard Omsk
- NHL draft: 31st overall, 1998; Vancouver Canucks
- Playing career: 1994–2010

Artyom Andreyevich "Artemis" Chubarov (Russian: Артём Андреевич Чубаров; born December 13, 1979) is a Russian former professional ice hockey player. He last played with HC Dynamo Moscow of the Kontinental Hockey League (KHL). He also played for the Vancouver Canucks of the National Hockey League (NHL) and for their minor league affiliates in both the International Hockey League and American Hockey League.

== Playing career ==
Artyom Chubarov was selected 31st overall in the 1998 NHL entry draft. He was the 2nd selection for the Vancouver Canucks. Prior to this, he spent four years playing in Russian ice hockey leagues, including the Torpedo organization in Nizhny Novgorod and HC Dynamo Moscow. Chubarov would spend one final season with Dynamo, which was highlighted by playing for the gold-medal-winning Russian team at the 1999 World Junior Championships in Winnipeg. Chubarov scored the winning goal in overtime of the final game against Canadian goaltender Roberto Luongo in the final game to give his team a 3–2 victory.

He then joined the Canucks for most of the 1999–2000 season, spending the rest with Syracuse of the AHL. He missed most of the 2000–01 season, playing only one game, after a shoulder injury while with Kansas City of the IHL.

Between the 1999–2000 and 2001–02 seasons, Chubarov would switch from the Canucks to their farm teams, playing for Syracuse, Kansas City, and Manitoba. He set a new NHL record by becoming the first player in NHL history to begin his career with four consecutive game-winning goals.

By the 2002–03 season, he finally earned a permanent spot with the Canucks as a faceoff specialist and defensive centre, helping them to the playoffs in both 2002–03 and 2003-2004.

With the 2004–05 NHL lockout, Chubarov joined his former team Dynamo Moscow. At the end of the lockout, it was reported he had refused to rejoin the Canucks, instead choosing to play in Russia. On August 22, 2005, he was signed by Avangard Omsk of the Super League, leaving Dynamo.

Chubarov joined Torpedo Nizhny Novgorod of the newly formed KHL to start the 2008–09 season.

== International play ==
Medal record

Ice hockey

Representing Russia

World Junior Championships
Gold medal – first place	1999 Canada	
Silver medal – second place	1998 Finland	

Chubarov won the gold medal with Russia at the 1999 World Junior Ice Hockey Championships, scoring the tournament-winning goal in overtime. He later took part in 2004 World Cup of Hockey.

== Records ==
- First player in NHL history to begin his career with four consecutive game-winning goals.

== Career statistics ==
=== Regular season and playoffs ===
			Regular season					Playoffs
Season	Team	League	GP	G	A	Pts	PIM	GP	G	A	Pts	PIM
1995–96	Torpedo–2 Nizhny Novgorod	RUS.2	2	0	0	0	0	—	—	—	—	—
1996–97	Torpedo–2 Nizhny Novgorod	RUS.3	42	24	7	31	34	—	—	—	—	—
1997–98	Dynamo Moscow	RSL	29	1	4	5	4	12	1	1	2	12
1997–98	Dynamo–2 Moscow	RUS.2	2	1	0	1	0	—	—	—	—	—
1998–99	Dynamo Moscow	RSL	35	8	2	10	10	12	0	0	0	4
1998–99	Dynamo–2 Moscow	RUS.2	3	1	1	2	2	—	—	—	—	—
1999–2000	Vancouver Canucks	NHL	49	1	8	9	10	—	—	—	—	—
1999–2000	Syracuse Crunch	AHL	14	7	6	13	4	1	0	0	0	0
2000–01	Vancouver Canucks	NHL	1	0	0	0	0	—	—	—	—	—
2000–01	Kansas City Blades	IHL	10	7	4	11	12	—	—	—	—	—
2001–02	Vancouver Canucks	NHL	51	5	5	10	10	6	0	1	1	0
2001–02	Manitoba Moose	AHL	19	7	12	19	4	—	—	—	—	—
2002–03	Vancouver Canucks	NHL	62	7	13	20	6	14	0	2	2	4
2003–04	Vancouver Canucks	NHL	65	12	7	19	14	7	0	1	1	0
2004–05	Dynamo Moscow	RSL	27	4	9	13	10	—	—	—	—	—
2005–06	Avangard Omsk	RSL	47	10	15	25	36	11	5	3	8	10
2006–07	Avangard Omsk	RSL	40	9	27	36	4	9	2	6	8	2
2007–08	Avangard Omsk	RSL	47	10	23	33	34	1	0	0	0	0
2008–09	Torpedo Nizhny Novgorod	KHL	40	4	17	21	2	3	0	0	0	2
2009–10	Dynamo Moscow	KHL	2	0	0	0	0	—	—	—	—	—
RSL totals			225	42	80	122	96	47	9	10	19	48
KHL totals			42	4	17	21	2	3	0	0	0	2
NHL totals			228	25	33	58	40	27	0	4	4	4

=== International ===
Year	Team	Event	GP	G	A	Pts	PIM
1997	Russia	EJC	6	1	3	4	6
1998	Russia	WJC	7	3	2	5	0
1999	Russia	WJC	7	4	3	7	4
2004	Russia	WCH	4	0	1	1	0
Junior totals			20	8	8	16	10
Senior totals			4	0	1	1	0

- All statistics taken from eliteprospects.com
