= 2004–05 Serie A (ice hockey) season =

Italian professional ice hockey season

The 2004–05 Serie A season was the 71st season of the Serie A, the top level of ice hockey in Italy. 10 teams participated in the league, and the HC Milano Vipers won the championship by defeating SG Cortina in the final.

== Regular season ==
	Club	GP	W	T	L	GF–GA	Pts
1.	HC Milano Vipers	36	24	10	2	156:78	58
2.	SG Cortina	36	23	8	5	112:65	54
3.	Asiago Hockey	36	18	9	9	124:98	45
4.	HC Bozen	36	20	5	11	141:101	45
5.	AS Varese Hockey	36	13	9	14	116:110	35
6.	SHC Fassa	36	13	9	14	107:106	35
7.	SV Ritten	36	10	6	20	87:104	26
8.	HC Pustertal	36	10	5	21	106:137	25
9.	HC Alleghe	36	8	6	22	89:153	22
10.	HC Turin	36	6	3	27	84:170	15

== Playoffs ==
Quarter-finals
HC Milano Vipers	4
HC Pustertal	0
HC Bozen	4
AS Varese Hockey	2
SG Cortina	4
SV Ritten	2
Asiago Hockey	4
SHC Fassa	0

Semi-finals
HC Milano Vipers	4
HC Bozen	0
SG Cortina	4
Asiago Hockey	1

Final
HC Milano Vipers	4
SG Cortina	3
