= 1998–99 I-Divisioona season =

The 1998–99 I-Divisioona season was the 25th season of the I-Divisioona, the second level of Finnish ice hockey. 12 teams participated in the league, and Kärpät Oulu won the championship. The top six teams from the regular season qualified for the promotion/relegation round of the SM-liiga.

== Regular season ==
	Club	GP	W	T	L	GF–GA	Pts
1.	Kärpät Oulu	48	41	4	3	265:91	86
2.	Pelicans Lahti	48	30	7	11	178:109	67
3.	Vaasan Sport	48	30	4	14	153:119	64
4.	Diskos Jyväskylä	48	25	5	18	167:154	55
5.	Hermes Kokkola	48	21	10	17	163:148	52
6.	JoKP Joensuu	48	17	7	24	128:161	41
7.	TuTo Hockey	48	17	5	26	158:182	39
8.	FPS Forssa	48	17	5	26	157:187	39
9.	SaPKo Savonlinna	48	17	4	27	131:165	38
10.	Haukat JärvenpääKarhut	48	15	5	28	120:185	35
11.	Jää-Kotkat Uusikaupunki	48	13	4	31	139:198	30
12.	Ahmat Hyvinkää	48	11	8	29	112:172	30
