= List of Los Angeles Kings draft picks =

The Los Angeles Kings are a professional ice hockey franchise based in Los Angeles, California. They play in the Pacific Division of the Western Conference in the National Hockey League (NHL). The franchise was founded in 1967. Since arriving in Los Angeles, the Kings have drafted 463 players. The 2020 draft was the 54th in which Los Angeles participated.

The NHL entry draft is held each June, allowing teams to select players who have turned 18 years old by September 15 in the year the draft is held. The draft order is determined by the previous season's order of finish, with non-playoff teams drafting first, followed by the teams that made the playoffs, with the specific order determined by the number of points earned by each team. The NHL holds a weighted lottery for the 14 non-playoff teams, the winner of the lottery will pick first overall as of 2013. Prior to 2013, the winning team could only move up a maximum of four positions in the entry draft. The team with the fewest points has the best chance of winning the lottery, with each successive team given a lower chance of moving up in the draft. The Kings have won the lottery once in 1995 – the team moved up from the seventh pick overall to the third pick, which they used to select Aki Berg. Between 1986 and 1994, the NHL also held a Supplemental Draft for players in American colleges.

Los Angeles' first draft pick was Rick Pagnutti, taken first overall in the 1967 NHL Amateur Draft; this is also the highest pick that Los Angeles has ever drafted. Thirteen picks went on to play over 1,000 NHL games: Larry Murphy, Luc Robitaille, Darryl Sydor, Martin Gelinas, Rob Blake, Garry Galley, Bernie Nicholls, Dave Taylor, Butch Goring, Jay Wells, Olli Jokinen, Alexei Zhitnik, and Kimmo Timonen. Four of Los Angeles' draft picks, Billy Smith, Larry Murphy, Luc Robitaille, and Rob Blake, have been elected to the Hockey Hall of Fame. Kings' 1984 draft pick Tom Glavine was also drafted by Major League Baseball (MLB)'s Atlanta Braves, choosing a career in MLB over the NHL.

== Key ==
| † | Selected to the Hockey Hall of Fame |
| * | Selected number one overall |
| | Played in at least one NHL game with the Kings |
| | Played in at least one NHL All-Star Game |

General
| Pos | Position |
| S | Supplemental draft selection |

Positions
| G | Goaltender | C | Centre |
| D | Defenceman | LW | Left wing |
| RW | Right wing | F | Forward |

Statistics
| GP | Games played | G | Goals |
| A | Assists | Pts | Points |
| PIM | Penalties in minutes | GAA | Goals against average |
| W | Wins | L | Losses |
| T | Ties | OT | Overtime/Shootout losses |
| GAA | Goals against average | | |

== Draft picks ==
Statistics are complete as of the 2025–26 NHL season and show each player's career regular season totals in the NHL. Wins, losses, ties, overtime losses and goals against average apply to goaltenders and are used only for players at that position. This list includes players drafted by the team in Los Angeles only.

| Draft | Round | Pick | Player | Nationality | Pos | GP | G | A | Pts | PIM | W | L | T | OT | GAA |
|---|---|---|---|---|---|---|---|---|---|---|---|---|---|---|---|
| 1967 | 1 | 1 | Rick Pagnutti* | Canada | D | | | | | | | | | | |
| 1968 | 1 | 7 | Jim McInally | Canada | D | | | | | | | | | | |
| 1969 | 2 | 16 | Dale Hoganson | Canada | D | 344 | 13 | 77 | 90 | 186 | | | | | |
| 1969 | 3 | 27 | Gregg Boddy | Canada | D | 273 | 23 | 44 | 67 | 263 | | | | | |
| 1969 | 4 | 39 | Bruce Landon | Canada | G | | | | | | | | | | |
| 1969 | 5 | 51 | Butch Goring | Canada | C | 1107 | 375 | 513 | 888 | 102 | | | | | |
| 1970 | 2 | 24 | Al McDonough | Canada | RW | 237 | 73 | 88 | 161 | 73 | | | | | |
| 1970 | 3 | 38 | Terry Holbrook | Canada | RW | 43 | 3 | 6 | 9 | 4 | | | | | |
| 1970 | 5 | 59 | Billy Smith† | Canada | G | 680 | 1 | 12 | 13 | 489 | 305 | 233 | 105 | – | 3.17 |
| 1970 | 6 | 73 | Gerry Bradbury | Canada | C | | | | | | | | | | |
| 1970 | 7 | 86 | Brian Carlin | Canada | LW | 5 | 1 | 0 | 1 | 0 | | | | | |
| 1970 | 8 | 98 | Brian Chinnick | Canada | C | | | | | | | | | | |
| 1971 | 3 | 34 | Vic Venasky | Canada | C | 430 | 61 | 101 | 162 | 66 | | | | | |
| 1971 | 4 | 48 | Neil Komadoski | Canada | D | 502 | 16 | 76 | 92 | 632 | | | | | |
| 1971 | 5 | 62 | Gary Crosby | Canada | C | | | | | | | | | | |
| 1971 | 6 | 76 | Camille LaPierre | Canada | C | | | | | | | | | | |
| 1971 | 7 | 89 | Pete Harasym | Canada | LW | | | | | | | | | | |
| 1971 | 7 | 90 | Norm Dube | Canada | LW | 57 | 8 | 10 | 18 | 54 | | | | | |
| 1971 | 8 | 103 | Lorne Stamler | Canada | LW | 116 | 14 | 11 | 25 | 16 | | | | | |
| 1972 | 2 | 30 | Don Kozak | Canada | RW | 437 | 96 | 86 | 182 | 480 | | | | | |
| 1972 | 3 | 36 | Dave Hutchison | Canada | D | 584 | 19 | 97 | 116 | 1550 | | | | | |
| 1972 | 4 | 52 | John Dobie | Canada | D | | | | | | | | | | |
| 1972 | 5 | 68 | Bernie Germain | Canada | G | | | | | | | | | | |
| 1972 | 6 | 84 | Mike Usitalo | USA | LW | | | | | | | | | | |
| 1972 | 7 | 100 | Glen Toner | Canada | LW | | | | | | | | | | |
| 1973 | 3 | 38 | Russ Walker | Canada | RW | 17 | 1 | 0 | 1 | 41 | | | | | |
| 1973 | 4 | 54 | Jim McCrimmon | Canada | D | 2 | 0 | 0 | 0 | 0 | | | | | |
| 1973 | 5 | 70 | Dennis Abgrall | Canada | RW | 13 | 0 | 2 | 2 | 4 | | | | | |
| 1973 | 6 | 86 | Blair MacDonald | Canada | RW | 219 | 91 | 100 | 191 | 65 | | | | | |
| 1973 | 7 | 102 | Roly Kimble | Canada | G | | | | | | | | | | |
| 1974 | 3 | 48 | Gary Sargent | USA | D | 402 | 61 | 161 | 222 | 273 | | | | | |
| 1974 | 4 | 66 | Brad Winton | Canada | C | | | | | | | | | | |
| 1974 | 5 | 84 | Paul Evans | Canada | C | 103 | 14 | 25 | 39 | 34 | | | | | |
| 1974 | 6 | 102 | Marty Mathews | Canada | LW | | | | | | | | | | |
| 1974 | 7 | 120 | Harvey Stewart | Canada | G | | | | | | | | | | |
| 1974 | 8 | 137 | John Held | Canada | D | | | | | | | | | | |
| 1974 | 9 | 154 | Mario Lessard | Canada | G | 240 | 0 | 6 | 6 | 30 | 92 | 97 | 39 | — | 3.74 |
| 1974 | 10 | 169 | Derrick Emerson | Canada | RW | | | | | | | | | | |
| 1974 | 11 | 184 | Jacques Locas | Canada | C | | | | | | | | | | |
| 1974 | 12 | 197 | Lindsay Thomson | Canada | C | | | | | | | | | | |
| 1974 | 13 | 207 | Craig Brickley | Canada | C | | | | | | | | | | |
| 1974 | 14 | 217 | Brad Kuglin | Canada | LW | | | | | | | | | | |
| 1975 | 1 | 16 | Tim Young | Canada | C | 628 | 195 | 341 | 536 | 438 | | | | | |
| 1975 | 2 | 33 | Terry Bucyk | Canada | RW | | | | | | | | | | |
| 1975 | 4 | 69 | Andre Leduc | Canada | D | | | | | | | | | | |
| 1975 | 5 | 87 | Dave Miglia | Canada | D | | | | | | | | | | |
| 1975 | 6 | 105 | Bob Russell | Canada | C | | | | | | | | | | |
| 1975 | 7 | 123 | Dave Faulkner | Canada | C | | | | | | | | | | |
| 1975 | 8 | 141 | Bill Reber | USA | RW | | | | | | | | | | |
| 1975 | 9 | 157 | Sean Sullivan | Canada | D | | | | | | | | | | |
| 1975 | 10 | 172 | Brian Petrovek | USA | G | | | | | | | | | | |
| 1975 | 11 | 186 | Tom Goddard | USA | RW | | | | | | | | | | |
| 1975 | 12 | 197 | Mario Vien | Canada | G | | | | | | | | | | |
| 1975 | 13 | 203 | Chuck Carpenter | USA | C | | | | | | | | | | |
| 1975 | 14 | 207 | Bob Fish | USA | LW | | | | | | | | | | |
| 1975 | 15 | 210 | Dave Taylor | Canada | RW | 1111 | 431 | 638 | 1069 | 1589 | | | | | |
| 1975 | 15 | 213 | Bob Shaw | Canada | D | | | | | | | | | | |
| 1976 | 2 | 21 | Steve Clippingdale | Canada | LW | 19 | 1 | 2 | 3 | 9 | | | | | |
| 1976 | 3 | 49 | Don Moores | Canada | C | | | | | | | | | | |
| 1976 | 4 | 67 | Bob Mears | Canada | G | | | | | | | | | | |
| 1976 | 5 | 85 | Rob Palmer | Canada | D | 320 | 9 | 101 | 110 | 115 | | | | | |
| 1976 | 6 | 103 | Larry McRae | Canada | G | | | | | | | | | | |
| 1977 | 5 | 84 | Julian Baretta | Canada | G | | | | | | | | | | |
| 1977 | 5 | 85 | Warren Holmes | Canada | C | 45 | 8 | 18 | 26 | 7 | | | | | |
| 1977 | 6 | 103 | Randy Rudnyk | Canada | RW | | | | | | | | | | |
| 1977 | 7 | 120 | Bob Suter | USA | D | | | | | | | | | | |
| 1978 | 5 | 77 | Paul Mancini | Canada | LW | | | | | | | | | | |
| 1978 | 6 | 94 | Doug Keans | Canada | G | 210 | 0 | 6 | 6 | 53 | 96 | 64 | 26 | – | 3.51 |
| 1978 | 7 | 111 | Don Waddell | USA | C | 1 | 0 | 0 | 0 | 0 | | | | | |
| 1978 | 8 | 128 | Rob Mierkalns | Canada | C | | | | | | | | | | |
| 1978 | 9 | 145 | Rick Scully | Canada | RW | | | | | | | | | | |
| 1978 | 10 | 162 | Brad Thiessen | Canada | C | | | | | | | | | | |
| 1978 | 11 | 177 | Jim Armstrong | USA | LW | | | | | | | | | | |
| 1978 | 12 | 193 | Claude Larochelle | Canada | C | | | | | | | | | | |
| 1979 | 1 | 16 | Jay Wells | Canada | D | 1098 | 47 | 216 | 263 | 2359 | | | | | |
| 1979 | 2 | 29 | Dean Hopkins | Canada | RW | 223 | 23 | 51 | 74 | 306 | | | | | |
| 1979 | 2 | 30 | Mark Hardy | Canada | D | 915 | 62 | 306 | 368 | 1293 | | | | | |
| 1979 | 3 | 50 | John Kelly | Canada | LW | 400 | 54 | 70 | 124 | 366 | | | | | |
| 1979 | 4 | 71 | John Gibson | Canada | C | 48 | 0 | 2 | 2 | 120 | | | | | |
| 1979 | 5 | 92 | Jim Brown | USA | D | 3 | 0 | 1 | 1 | 5 | | | | | |
| 1979 | 6 | 113 | Jay McFarlane | Canada | D | | | | | | | | | | |
| 1980 | 1 | 4 | Larry Murphy† | Canada | D | 1615 | 287 | 929 | 1216 | 1084 | | | | | |
| 1980 | 1 | 10 | Jim Fox | Canada | RW | 578 | 186 | 293 | 479 | 143 | | | | | |
| 1980 | 2 | 33 | Greg Terrion | Canada | C | 561 | 93 | 150 | 243 | 339 | | | | | |
| 1980 | 2 | 34 | Dave Morrison | Canada | RW | 39 | 3 | 3 | 6 | 4 | | | | | |
| 1980 | 3 | 52 | Steve Bozek | Canada | LW | 641 | 164 | 167 | 331 | 309 | | | | | |
| 1980 | 4 | 73 | Bernie Nicholls | Canada | C | 1127 | 475 | 734 | 1209 | 1292 | | | | | |
| 1980 | 5 | 94 | Alan Graves | France | LW | | | | | | | | | | |
| 1980 | 6 | 115 | Darren Eliot | Canada | G | 89 | 0 | 2 | 2 | 24 | 25 | 41 | 12 | — | 4.59 |
| 1980 | 7 | 136 | Mike O'Connor | Canada | D | | | | | | | | | | |
| 1980 | 8 | 157 | Billy O'Dwyer | USA | C | 120 | 9 | 13 | 22 | 108 | | | | | |
| 1980 | 9 | 178 | Daryl Evans | Canada | RW | 113 | 22 | 30 | 52 | 25 | | | | | |
| 1980 | 10 | 199 | Kim Collins | Canada | LW | | | | | | | | | | |
| 1981 | 1 | 2 | Doug Smith | Canada | C | 535 | 115 | 138 | 253 | 624 | | | | | |
| 1981 | 2 | 39 | Dean Kennedy | Canada | D | 717 | 26 | 110 | 136 | 1118 | | | | | |
| 1981 | 4 | 81 | Marty Dallman | Canada | C | 6 | 0 | 1 | 1 | 0 | | | | | |
| 1981 | 6 | 123 | Brad Thompson | Canada | D | | | | | | | | | | |
| 1981 | 7 | 134 | Craig Hurley | Canada | D | | | | | | | | | | |
| 1981 | 7 | 144 | Peter Sawkins | USA | D | | | | | | | | | | |
| 1981 | 8 | 165 | Dan Brennan | Canada | LW | 8 | 0 | 1 | 1 | 9 | | | | | |
| 1981 | 9 | 186 | Al Tuer | Canada | D | 57 | 1 | 1 | 2 | 208 | | | | | |
| 1981 | 10 | 207 | Jeff Baikie | Canada | C | | | | | | | | | | |
| 1982 | 2 | 27 | Mike Heidt | Canada | D | 6 | 0 | 1 | 1 | 7 | | | | | |
| 1982 | 3 | 48 | Steve Seguin | Canada | RW | 5 | 0 | 0 | 0 | 9 | | | | | |
| 1982 | 4 | 64 | Dave Gans | Canada | C | 6 | 0 | 0 | 0 | 2 | | | | | |
| 1982 | 4 | 82 | Dave Ross | Canada | G | | | | | | | | | | |
| 1982 | 5 | 90 | Darcy Roy | Canada | LW | | | | | | | | | | |
| 1982 | 5 | 95 | Ulf Isaksson | Sweden | LW | 50 | 7 | 15 | 22 | 10 | | | | | |
| 1982 | 7 | 132 | Victor Nechayev | Soviet Union | C | 3 | 1 | 0 | 1 | 0 | | | | | |
| 1982 | 8 | 153 | Peter Helander | Sweden | D | 7 | 0 | 1 | 1 | 0 | | | | | |
| 1982 | 9 | 174 | Dave Chartier | Canada | D | | | | | | | | | | |
| 1982 | 10 | 195 | John Franzosa | USA | G | | | | | | | | | | |
| 1982 | 11 | 216 | Ray Shero | USA | C | | | | | | | | | | |
| 1982 | 12 | 237 | Mats Ulander | Sweden | RW | | | | | | | | | | |
| 1983 | 3 | 47 | Bruce Shoebottom | Canada | D | 35 | 1 | 4 | 5 | 53 | | | | | |
| 1983 | 4 | 67 | Guy Benoit | Canada | C | | | | | | | | | | |
| 1983 | 5 | 87 | Bob Laforest | Canada | RW | 5 | 1 | 0 | 1 | 2 | | | | | |
| 1983 | 5 | 100 | Garry Galley | Canada | D | 1149 | 125 | 475 | 600 | 1218 | | | | | |
| 1983 | 6 | 107 | Dave Lundmark | USA | D | | | | | | | | | | |
| 1983 | 6 | 108 | Kevin Stevens | USA | LW | 874 | 329 | 397 | 726 | 1470 | | | | | |
| 1983 | 7 | 127 | Tim Burgess | Canada | D | | | | | | | | | | |
| 1983 | 8 | 147 | Ken Hammond | Canada | D | 193 | 18 | 29 | 47 | 290 | | | | | |
| 1983 | 9 | 167 | Bruce Fishback | USA | C | | | | | | | | | | |
| 1983 | 10 | 187 | Thomas Ahlen | Sweden | D | | | | | | | | | | |
| 1983 | 11 | 207 | Jan Blaha | Czechoslovakia | RW | | | | | | | | | | |
| 1983 | 12 | 227 | Chad Johnson | USA | C | | | | | | | | | | |
| 1984 | 1 | 6 | Craig Redmond | Canada | D | 191 | 16 | 68 | 84 | 134 | | | | | |
| 1984 | 2 | 24 | Brian Wilks | Canada | C | 48 | 4 | 8 | 12 | 27 | | | | | |
| 1984 | 3 | 48 | John English | Canada | D | 3 | 1 | 3 | 4 | 4 | | | | | |
| 1984 | 4 | 69 | Tom Glavine | USA | C | | | | | | | | | | |
| 1984 | 5 | 87 | David Grannis | USA | RW | | | | | | | | | | |
| 1984 | 6 | 108 | Greg Strome | Canada | G | | | | | | | | | | |
| 1984 | 7 | 129 | Tim Hanley | USA | C | | | | | | | | | | |
| 1984 | 8 | 150 | Shannon Deegan | Canada | C | | | | | | | | | | |
| 1984 | 9 | 171 | Luc Robitaille† | Canada | LW | 1431 | 668 | 726 | 1394 | 1177 | | | | | |
| 1984 | 10 | 191 | Jeff Crossman | Canada | C | | | | | | | | | | |
| 1984 | 11 | 212 | Paul Kenny | Canada | G | | | | | | | | | | |
| 1984 | 12 | 232 | Brian Martin | Canada | LW | | | | | | | | | | |
| 1985 | 1 | 9 | Craig Duncanson | Canada | RW | 38 | 5 | 4 | 9 | 61 | | | | | |
| 1985 | 1 | 10 | Dan Gratton | Canada | C | 7 | 1 | 0 | 1 | 5 | | | | | |
| 1985 | 2 | 30 | Par Edlund | Sweden | LW | | | | | | | | | | |
| 1985 | 4 | 72 | Perry Florio | USA | D | | | | | | | | | | |
| 1985 | 5 | 93 | Petr Prajsler | Czechoslovakia | D | 46 | 3 | 10 | 13 | 51 | | | | | |
| 1985 | 7 | 135 | Tim Flanagan | Canada | RW | | | | | | | | | | |
| 1985 | 8 | 156 | John Hyduke | USA | G | | | | | | | | | | |
| 1985 | 9 | 177 | Steve Horner | Canada | RW | | | | | | | | | | |
| 1985 | 11 | 219 | Trent Ciprick | Canada | RW | | | | | | | | | | |
| 1985 | 12 | 240 | Marian Horvath | Czechoslovakia | F | | | | | | | | | | |
| 1986 | 1 | 2 | Jimmy Carson | USA | C | 626 | 275 | 286 | 561 | 254 | | | | | |
| 1986 | 3 | 44 | Denis Larocque | Canada | D | 8 | 0 | 1 | 1 | 18 | | | | | |
| 1986 | 4 | 65 | Sylvain Couturier | Canada | C | 33 | 4 | 5 | 9 | 4 | | | | | |
| 1986 | 5 | 86 | Brian Ferreira | USA | C | | | | | | | | | | |
| 1986 | 6 | 107 | Robb Stauber | USA | G | 62 | 0 | 2 | 2 | 22 | 21 | 23 | 9 | — | 3.81 |
| 1986 | 7 | 128 | Sean Krakiwsky | Canada | RW | | | | | | | | | | |
| 1986 | 8 | 149 | Rene Chapdelaine | Canada | D | 32 | 0 | 2 | 2 | 32 | | | | | |
| 1986 | 9 | 170 | Trevor Pochipinski | Canada | D | | | | | | | | | | |
| 1986 | 10 | 191 | Paul Kelly | Canada | D | | | | | | | | | | |
| 1986 | 11 | 212 | Russ Mann | USA | D | | | | | | | | | | |
| 1986 | 12 | 233 | Brian Hayton | Canada | LW | | | | | | | | | | |
| 1986 | S | 1 | Bob Kudelski | USA | C | 442 | 139 | 102 | 241 | 218 | | | | | |
| 1987 | 1 | 4 | Wayne McBean | Canada | D | 211 | 10 | 39 | 49 | 168 | | | | | |
| 1987 | 2 | 27 | Mark Fitzpatrick | Canada | G | 329 | 0 | 12 | 12 | 87 | 113 | 136 | 49 | — | 3.12 |
| 1987 | 3 | 43 | Ross Wilson | Canada | RW | | | | | | | | | | |
| 1987 | 5 | 90 | Michael Vukonich | USA | C | | | | | | | | | | |
| 1987 | 6 | 111 | Greg Batters | Canada | RW | | | | | | | | | | |
| 1987 | 7 | 132 | Kyosti Karjalainen | Sweden | LW | 28 | 1 | 8 | 9 | 12 | | | | | |
| 1987 | 9 | 174 | Jeff Gawlicki | Canada | LW | | | | | | | | | | |
| 1987 | 10 | 195 | John Preston | USA | C | | | | | | | | | | |
| 1987 | 11 | 216 | Rostislav Vlach | Czechoslovakia | RW | | | | | | | | | | |
| 1987 | 12 | 237 | Mikael Lindholm | Sweden | C | 18 | 2 | 2 | 4 | 2 | | | | | |
| 1987 | S | 10 | Chris Panek | USA | D | | | | | | | | | | |
| 1988 | 1 | 7 | Martin Gelinas | Canada | LW | 1273 | 309 | 351 | 660 | 820 | | | | | |
| 1988 | 2 | 28 | Paul Holden | Canada | D | | | | | | | | | | |
| 1988 | 3 | 49 | John Van Kessel | Canada | D | | | | | | | | | | |
| 1988 | 4 | 70 | Rob Blake† | Canada | D | 1270 | 240 | 537 | 777 | 1679 | | | | | |
| 1988 | 5 | 91 | Jeff Robison | USA | D | | | | | | | | | | |
| 1988 | 6 | 109 | Micah Aivazoff | Canada | C | 92 | 4 | 6 | 10 | 46 | | | | | |
| 1988 | 6 | 112 | Robert Larsson | Sweden | D | | | | | | | | | | |
| 1988 | 7 | 133 | Jeffrey Kruesel | USA | G | | | | | | | | | | |
| 1988 | 8 | 154 | Timo Peltomaa | Finland | RW | | | | | | | | | | |
| 1988 | 9 | 175 | James Larkin | USA | LW | | | | | | | | | | |
| 1988 | 10 | 196 | Brad Hyatt | Canada | D | | | | | | | | | | |
| 1988 | 11 | 217 | Douglas Laprade | Canada | RW | | | | | | | | | | |
| 1988 | 12 | 238 | Joseph Flanagan | USA | C | | | | | | | | | | |
| 1988 | S | 12 | Sean Fitzgerald | USA | LW | | | | | | | | | | |
| 1989 | 2 | 39 | Brent Thompson | Canada | D | 121 | 1 | 10 | 11 | 352 | | | | | |
| 1989 | 4 | 81 | Jim Maher | USA | D | | | | | | | | | | |
| 1989 | 5 | 102 | Eric Ricard | Canada | D | | | | | | | | | | |
| 1989 | 5 | 103 | Thomas Newman | USA | G | | | | | | | | | | |
| 1989 | 6 | 123 | Daniel Rydmark | Sweden | C | | | | | | | | | | |
| 1989 | 7 | 144 | Ted Kramer | USA | RW | | | | | | | | | | |
| 1989 | 8 | 165 | Sean Whyte | Canada | RW | 21 | 0 | 2 | 2 | 12 | | | | | |
| 1989 | 9 | 182 | Jim Giacin | USA | LW | | | | | | | | | | |
| 1989 | 9 | 186 | Martin Maskarinec | Czechoslovakia | D | | | | | | | | | | |
| 1989 | 10 | 207 | Jim Hiller | Canada | RW | 63 | 8 | 12 | 20 | 116 | | | | | |
| 1989 | 11 | 228 | Steve Jacques | Canada | D | | | | | | | | | | |
| 1989 | 12 | 249 | Kevin Sneddon | Canada | D | | | | | | | | | | |
| 1989 | S | 23 | Carl Repp | Canada | G | | | | | | | | | | |
| 1990 | 1 | 7 | Darryl Sydor | Canada | D | 1291 | 98 | 409 | 507 | 755 | | | | | |
| 1990 | 2 | 28 | Thomas Semchuk | Canada | RW | 1 | 0 | 0 | 0 | 0 | | | | | |
| 1990 | 3 | 49 | Robert Berg | Canada | LW | | | | | | | | | | |
| 1990 | 5 | 91 | David Goverde | Canada | G | 5 | 0 | 1 | 1 | 0 | 1 | 4 | 0 | – | 6.25 |
| 1990 | 6 | 112 | Erik Andersson | Sweden | RW | 12 | 2 | 1 | 3 | 8 | | | | | |
| 1990 | 7 | 133 | Robert Lang | Czechoslovakia | C | 989 | 261 | 442 | 703 | 422 | | | | | |
| 1990 | 8 | 154 | Dean Hulett | USA | RW | | | | | | | | | | |
| 1990 | 9 | 175 | Denis Leblanc | Canada | C | | | | | | | | | | |
| 1990 | 10 | 196 | Patrik Ross | Sweden | RW | | | | | | | | | | |
| 1990 | 11 | 217 | Kevin White | Canada | C | | | | | | | | | | |
| 1990 | 12 | 238 | Troy Mohns | Canada | D | | | | | | | | | | |
| 1990 | S | 12 | Peter Sentner | USA | D | | | | | | | | | | |
| 1991 | 2 | 42 | Guy Leveque | Canada | C | 17 | 2 | 2 | 4 | 21 | | | | | |
| 1991 | 4 | 79 | Keith Redmond | Canada | LW | 12 | 1 | 0 | 1 | 20 | | | | | |
| 1991 | 4 | 81 | Alexei Zhitnik | Soviet Union | D | 1085 | 96 | 375 | 471 | 1268 | | | | | |
| 1991 | 5 | 180 | Pauli Jaks | Switzerland | G | 1 | 0 | 0 | 0 | 0 | 0 | 0 | 0 | 0 | 3.00 |
| 1991 | 6 | 130 | Brett Seguin | Canada | C | | | | | | | | | | |
| 1991 | 7 | 152 | Kelly Fairchild | United States | C | 34 | 2 | 3 | 5 | 6 | | | | | |
| 1991 | 9 | 196 | Craig Brown | Canada | G | | | | | | | | | | |
| 1991 | 10 | 218 | Mattias Olsson | Sweden | D | | | | | | | | | | |
| 1991 | 11 | 240 | Andre Boulianne | Canada | G | | | | | | | | | | |
| 1991 | 12 | 262 | Michael Gaul | Canada | D | 3 | 0 | 0 | 0 | 4 | | | | | |
| 1991 | S | 26 | Brendan Creagh | USA | D | | | | | | | | | | |
| 1992 | 2 | 39 | Justin Hocking | Canada | D | 1 | 0 | 0 | 0 | 0 | | | | | |
| 1992 | 3 | 63 | Sandy Allan | Bahamas | G | | | | | | | | | | |
| 1992 | 4 | 87 | Kevin Brown | United Kingdom | RW | 64 | 7 | 9 | 16 | 28 | | | | | |
| 1992 | 5 | 111 | Jeff Shevalier | Canada | LW | 32 | 5 | 9 | 14 | 8 | | | | | |
| 1992 | 6 | 135 | Rem Murray | Canada | LW | 560 | 94 | 121 | 215 | 161 | | | | | |
| 1992 | 9 | 207 | Magnus Wernblom | Sweden | RW | | | | | | | | | | |
| 1992 | 10 | 231 | Ryan Pisiak | Canada | RW | | | | | | | | | | |
| 1992 | 11 | 255 | Jukka Tiilikainen | Finland | RW | | | | | | | | | | |
| 1993 | 2 | 42 | Shayne Toporowski | Canada | RW | 3 | 0 | 0 | 0 | 7 | | | | | |
| 1993 | 3 | 68 | Jeff Mitchell | USA | RW | 7 | 0 | 0 | 0 | 7 | | | | | |
| 1993 | 4 | 94 | Bob Wren | Canada | C | 5 | 0 | 0 | 0 | 0 | | | | | |
| 1993 | 5 | 105 | Frederik Beaubien | Canada | G | | | | | | | | | | |
| 1993 | 5 | 117 | Jason Saal | USA | G | | | | | | | | | | |
| 1993 | 5 | 120 | Tomas Vlasak | Czech Republic | LW | 10 | 1 | 3 | 4 | 2 | | | | | |
| 1993 | 6 | 146 | Jere Karalahti | Finland | D | 149 | 8 | 19 | 27 | 97 | | | | | |
| 1993 | 7 | 172 | Justin Martin | USA | RW | | | | | | | | | | |
| 1993 | 8 | 198 | Travis Dillabough | Canada | LW | | | | | | | | | | |
| 1993 | 9 | 224 | Martin Strbak | Slovakia | D | 49 | 5 | 11 | 16 | 46 | | | | | |
| 1993 | 10 | 250 | Kimmo Timonen | Finland | D | 1108 | 117 | 454 | 571 | 654 | | | | | |
| 1993 | 11 | 276 | Patrick Howald | Switzerland | LW | | | | | | | | | | |
| 1994 | 1 | 7 | Jamie Storr | Canada | G | 219 | 0 | 3 | 3 | 26 | 85 | 86 | 23 | 0 | 2.54 |
| 1994 | 2 | 33 | Matt Johnson | Canada | LW | 473 | 23 | 20 | 43 | 1523 | | | | | |
| 1994 | 3 | 59 | Vitali Yachmenev | Russia | LW | 487 | 83 | 133 | 216 | 88 | | | | | |
| 1994 | 5 | 111 | Chris Schmidt | Canada | C | 10 | 0 | 2 | 2 | 5 | | | | | |
| 1994 | 7 | 163 | Luc Gagne | Canada | F | | | | | | | | | | |
| 1994 | 8 | 189 | Andrew Dale | Canada | C | | | | | | | | | | |
| 1994 | 9 | 215 | Jan Nemecek | Czech Republic | D | 7 | 1 | 0 | 1 | 4 | | | | | |
| 1994 | 10 | 241 | Sergei Shalamai | Russia | LW | | | | | | | | | | |
| 1994 | S | 7 | Quinn Fair | Canada | D | | | | | | | | | | |
| 1995 | 1 | 3 | Aki Berg | Finland | D | 606 | 15 | 70 | 85 | 374 | | | | | |
| 1995 | 2 | 33 | Donald MacLean | Canada | C | 41 | 8 | 5 | 13 | 6 | | | | | |
| 1995 | 2 | 50 | Pavel Rosa | Czech Republic | RW | 36 | 5 | 13 | 18 | 6 | | | | | |
| 1995 | 3 | 59 | Vladimir Tsyplakov | Russia | LW | 331 | 69 | 101 | 170 | 90 | | | | | |
| 1995 | 5 | 118 | Jason Morgan | Canada | C | 44 | 2 | 5 | 7 | 18 | | | | | |
| 1995 | 6 | 137 | Igor Melyakov | Russia | F | | | | | | | | | | |
| 1995 | 7 | 157 | Benoit Larose | Canada | D | | | | | | | | | | |
| 1995 | 7 | 163 | Juha Vuorivirta | Finland | F | | | | | | | | | | |
| 1995 | 9 | 215 | Brian Stewart | Canada | D | | | | | | | | | | |
| 1996 | 2 | 30 | Josh Green | Canada | RW | 341 | 36 | 40 | 76 | 206 | | | | | |
| 1996 | 2 | 37 | Marian Cisar | Slovakia | RW | 73 | 13 | 17 | 30 | 57 | | | | | |
| 1996 | 3 | 57 | Greg Phillips | Canada | RW | | | | | | | | | | |
| 1996 | 4 | 84 | Mikael Simons | Sweden | RW | | | | | | | | | | |
| 1996 | 4 | 96 | Eric Belanger | Canada | C | 820 | 138 | 220 | 358 | 361 | | | | | |
| 1996 | 5 | 120 | Jesse Black | Canada | D | | | | | | | | | | |
| 1996 | 5 | 123 | Peter Hogan | Canada | D | | | | | | | | | | |
| 1996 | 8 | 190 | Steve Valiquette | Canada | G | 46 | 0 | 1 | 1 | 4 | 16 | 14 | 0 | 5 | 2.74 |
| 1996 | 8 | 193 | Kai Nurminen | Finland | F | 69 | 17 | 11 | 28 | 24 | | | | | |
| 1996 | 9 | 219 | Sebastien Simard | Canada | F | | | | | | | | | | |
| 1997 | 1 | 3 | Olli Jokinen | Finland | C | 1231 | 321 | 429 | 750 | 1071 | | | | | |
| 1997 | 1 | 15 | Matt Zultek | Canada | LW | | | | | | | | | | |
| 1997 | 2 | 29 | Scott Barney | Canada | RW | 27 | 5 | 6 | 11 | 4 | | | | | |
| 1997 | 4 | 83 | Joe Corvo | USA | D | 708 | 92 | 218 | 310 | 241 | | | | | |
| 1997 | 4 | 99 | Sean Blanchard | Canada | D | | | | | | | | | | |
| 1997 | 6 | 137 | Richard Seeley | Canada | D | | | | | | | | | | |
| 1997 | 6 | 150 | Jeff Katcher | Canada | D | | | | | | | | | | |
| 1997 | 8 | 193 | Jay Kopischke | USA | LW | | | | | | | | | | |
| 1997 | 9 | 220 | Konrad Brand | Canada | D | | | | | | | | | | |
| 1998 | 1 | 21 | Mathieu Biron | Canada | D | 253 | 12 | 32 | 44 | 177 | | | | | |
| 1998 | 2 | 46 | Justin Papineau | Canada | C | 81 | 11 | 8 | 19 | 12 | | | | | |
| 1998 | 3 | 76 | Alexei Volkov | Russia | G | | | | | | | | | | |
| 1998 | 4 | 103 | Kip Brennan | Canada | LW | 61 | 1 | 1 | 2 | 222 | | | | | |
| 1998 | 5 | 133 | Joe Rullier | Canada | D | | | | | | | | | | |
| 1998 | 6 | 163 | Tomas Zizka | Czech Republic | D | 25 | 2 | 6 | 8 | 16 | | | | | |
| 1998 | 7 | 190 | Tommi Hannus | Finland | F | | | | | | | | | | |
| 1998 | 8 | 217 | Jim Henkel | USA | C | | | | | | | | | | |
| 1998 | 9 | 248 | Matthew Yeats | Canada | G | 5 | 0 | 0 | 0 | 2 | 1 | 3 | 0 | 0 | 3.03 |
| 1999 | 2 | 43 | Andrei Shefer | Russia | LW | | | | | | | | | | |
| 1999 | 3 | 74 | Jason Crain | USA | D | | | | | | | | | | |
| 1999 | 3 | 76 | Frantisek Kaberle | Czech Republic | D | 523 | 29 | 164 | 193 | 218 | | | | | |
| 1999 | 3 | 92 | Cory Campbell | Canada | G | | | | | | | | | | |
| 1999 | 4 | 104 | Brian McGrattan | Canada | RW | 317 | 10 | 17 | 27 | 609 | | | | | |
| 1999 | 4 | 125 | Daniel Johansson | Sweden | D | | | | | | | | | | |
| 1999 | 5 | 133 | Jean-Francois Nogues | Canada | G | | | | | | | | | | |
| 1999 | 7 | 193 | Kevin Baker | Canada | RW | | | | | | | | | | |
| 1999 | 8 | 222 | George Parros | USA | RW | 474 | 18 | 18 | 36 | 1092 | | | | | |
| 1999 | 9 | 250 | Noah Clarke | USA | LW | 21 | 3 | 1 | 4 | 4 | | | | | |
| 2000 | 1 | 20 | Alexander Frolov | Russia | LW | 579 | 175 | 222 | 397 | 218 | | | | | |
| 2000 | 2 | 54 | Andreas Lilja | Sweden | D | 580 | 16 | 71 | 87 | 563 | | | | | |
| 2000 | 3 | 86 | Yanick Lehoux | Canada | C | 10 | 2 | 2 | 4 | 6 | | | | | |
| 2000 | 4 | 118 | Lubomir Visnovsky | Slovakia | D | 883 | 128 | 367 | 495 | 373 | | | | | |
| 2000 | 5 | 165 | Nathan Marsters | Canada | G | | | | | | | | | | |
| 2000 | 7 | 201 | Evgeny Fedorov | Russia | C | | | | | | | | | | |
| 2000 | 7 | 206 | Tim Eriksson | Sweden | LW | | | | | | | | | | |
| 2000 | 7 | 218 | Craig Olynick | Canada | D | | | | | | | | | | |
| 2000 | 8 | 245 | Daniel Welch | USA | F | | | | | | | | | | |
| 2000 | 8 | 250 | Flavien Conne | Switzerland | F | | | | | | | | | | |
| 2000 | 9 | 282 | Carl Grahn | Finland | G | | | | | | | | | | |
| 2001 | 1 | 18 | Jens Karlsson | Sweden | LW | | | | | | | | | | |
| 2001 | 1 | 30 | David Steckel | USA | C | 425 | 33 | 46 | 79 | 129 | | | | | |
| 2001 | 2 | 49 | Michael Cammalleri | Canada | C | 906 | 294 | 348 | 642 | 425 | | | | | |
| 2001 | 2 | 51 | Jaroslav Bednar | Czech Republic | RW | 102 | 10 | 25 | 35 | 30 | | | | | |
| 2001 | 3 | 83 | Henrik Juntunen | Sweden | LW | | | | | | | | | | |
| 2001 | 4 | 116 | Richard Petiot | Canada | D | 15 | 0 | 3 | 3 | 25 | | | | | |
| 2001 | 5 | 152 | Terry Denike | Canada | G | | | | | | | | | | |
| 2001 | 5 | 153 | Tuukka Mantyla | Finland | D | | | | | | | | | | |
| 2001 | 7 | 214 | Cristobal Huet | France | G | 272 | 0 | 3 | 3 | 10 | 129 | 90 | 11 | 21 | 2.46 |
| 2001 | 8 | 237 | Mike Gabinet | Canada | D | | | | | | | | | | |
| 2001 | 9 | 277 | Sebastien Laplante | Canada | G | | | | | | | | | | |
| 2002 | 1 | 18 | Denis Grebeshkov | Russia | D | 234 | 17 | 68 | 85 | 114 | | | | | |
| 2002 | 2 | 50 | Sergei Anshakov | Russia | LW | | | | | | | | | | |
| 2002 | 3 | 66 | Petr Kanko | Czech Republic | D | 10 | 1 | 0 | 1 | 0 | | | | | |
| 2002 | 4 | 104 | Aaron Rome | Canada | D | 226 | 6 | 22 | 28 | 185 | | | | | |
| 2002 | 4 | 115 | Mark Rooneem | Canada | LW | | | | | | | | | | |
| 2002 | 5 | 152 | Gregory Hogeboom | Canada | C | | | | | | | | | | |
| 2002 | 5 | 157 | Joel Andresen | Canada | D | | | | | | | | | | |
| 2002 | 6 | 185 | Ryan Murphy | USA | RW | | | | | | | | | | |
| 2002 | 7 | 215 | Mikhail Lyubushin | Russia | D | | | | | | | | | | |
| 2002 | 8 | 248 | Tuukka Pulliainen | Finland | F | | | | | | | | | | |
| 2002 | 9 | 279 | Connor James | Canada | C | 16 | 1 | 0 | 1 | 2 | | | | | |
| 2003 | 1 | 13 | Dustin Brown | USA | RW | 1296 | 325 | 387 | 712 | 738 | | | | | |
| 2003 | 1 | 26 | Brian Boyle | USA | C | 871 | 141 | 111 | 252 | 615 | | | | | |
| 2003 | 1 | 27 | Jeff Tambellini | Canada | LW | 242 | 27 | 36 | 63 | 88 | | | | | |
| 2003 | 2 | 44 | Konstantin Pushkarev | Kazakhstan | RW | 17 | 2 | 3 | 5 | 8 | | | | | |
| 2003 | 3 | 82 | Ryan Munce | Canada | G | | | | | | | | | | |
| 2003 | 5 | 152 | Brady Murray | Canada | F | 4 | 1 | 0 | 1 | 6 | | | | | |
| 2003 | 6 | 174 | Esa Pirnes | Finland | C | 57 | 3 | 8 | 11 | 12 | | | | | |
| 2003 | 8 | 231 | Matt Zaba | Canada | G | 1 | 0 | 0 | 0 | 0 | 0 | 0 | 0 | 0 | 3.56 |
| 2003 | 8 | 244 | Mike Sullivan | Canada | C | | | | | | | | | | |
| 2003 | 9 | 274 | Marty Guerin | USA | F | | | | | | | | | | |
| 2004 | 1 | 11 | Lauri Tukonen | Finland | RW | 5 | 0 | 0 | 0 | 0 | | | | | |
| 2004 | 3 | 95 | Paul Baier | USA | D | | | | | | | | | | |
| 2004 | 4 | 110 | Ned Lukacevic | Serbia | LW | | | | | | | | | | |
| 2004 | 5 | 143 | Eric Neilson | Canada | RW | | | | | | | | | | |
| 2004 | 6 | 174 | Scott Parse | USA | RW | 73 | 14 | 16 | 30 | 36 | | | | | |
| 2004 | 7 | 205 | Mike Curry | USA | LW | | | | | | | | | | |
| 2004 | 7 | 221 | Daniel Taylor | Great Britain | G | 4 | 0 | 0 | 0 | 0 | 1 | 2 | 0 | 0 | 3.63 |
| 2004 | 8 | 238 | Yutaka Fukufuji | Japan | G | 4 | 0 | 0 | 0 | 0 | 0 | 3 | 0 | 0 | 4.37 |
| 2004 | 9 | 264 | Valtteri Tenkanen | Finland | C | | | | | | | | | | |
| 2005 | 1 | 11 | Anze Kopitar | Slovenia | C | 1521 | 452 | 864 | 1316 | 358 | | | | | |
| 2005 | 2 | 50 | Dany Roussin | Canada | LW | | | | | | | | | | |
| 2005 | 2 | 60 | T. J. Fast | Canada | D | | | | | | | | | | |
| 2005 | 3 | 72 | Jonathan Quick | USA | G | 829 | 0 | 23 | 23 | 92 | 410 | 307 | 0 | 90 | 2.51 |
| 2005 | 5 | 139 | Patrik Hersley | Sweden | D | | | | | | | | | | |
| 2005 | 6 | 184 | Ryan McGinnis | USA | D | | | | | | | | | | |
| 2005 | 7 | 206 | Josh Meyers | USA | D | | | | | | | | | | |
| 2005 | 7 | 226 | John Seymour | Canada | LW | | | | | | | | | | |
| 2006 | 1 | 11 | Jonathan Bernier | Canada | G | 404 | 0 | 8 | 8 | 14 | 165 | 163 | 0 | 40 | 2.78 |
| 2006 | 1 | 17 | Trevor Lewis | USA | C | 1034 | 104 | 133 | 237 | 243 | | | | | |
| 2006 | 2 | 48 | Joey Ryan | USA | D | | | | | | | | | | |
| 2006 | 3 | 74 | Jeff Zatkoff | USA | G | 48 | 0 | 1 | 1 | 0 | 18 | 21 | 0 | 4 | 2.72 |
| 2006 | 3 | 86 | Bud Holloway | Canada | LW | 1 | 0 | 0 | 0 | 0 | | | | | |
| 2006 | 4 | 114 | Niclas Andersen | Sweden | D | | | | | | | | | | |
| 2006 | 5 | 134 | David Meckler | USA | LW | | | | | | | | | | |
| 2006 | 5 | 144 | Martin Nolet | Canada | D | | | | | | | | | | |
| 2006 | 6 | 164 | Constantin Braun | Germany | LW | | | | | | | | | | |
| 2007 | 1 | 4 | Thomas Hickey | Canada | D | 456 | 22 | 95 | 117 | 190 | | | | | |
| 2007 | 2 | 52 | Oscar Moller | Sweden | C | 87 | 12 | 14 | 26 | 22 | | | | | |
| 2007 | 2 | 61 | Wayne Simmonds | Canada | RW | 1037 | 263 | 263 | 526 | 1313 | | | | | |
| 2007 | 3 | 82 | Bryan Cameron | Canada | C | | | | | | | | | | |
| 2007 | 4 | 95 | Alec Martinez | USA | D | 862 | 88 | 201 | 289 | 250 | | | | | |
| 2007 | 4 | 109 | Dwight King | Canada | C | 365 | 53 | 56 | 109 | 98 | | | | | |
| 2007 | 5 | 124 | Linden Rowat | Canada | G | | | | | | | | | | |
| 2007 | 5 | 137 | Joshua Turnbull | USA | D | | | | | | | | | | |
| 2007 | 7 | 184 | Josh Kidd | Canada | D | | | | | | | | | | |
| 2007 | 7 | 188 | Matt Fillier | Canada | LW | | | | | | | | | | |
| 2008 | 1 | 2 | Drew Doughty | Canada | D | 1279 | 165 | 544 | 709 | 829 | | | | | |
| 2008 | 1 | 13 | Colten Teubert | Canada | D | 24 | 0 | 1 | 1 | 25 | | | | | |
| 2008 | 2 | 32 | Slava Voynov | Russia | D | 190 | 18 | 63 | 81 | 72 | | | | | |
| 2008 | 3 | 63 | Robbie Czarnik | USA | F | | | | | | | | | | |
| 2008 | 3 | 74 | Andrew Campbell | Canada | D | 42 | 0 | 2 | 2 | 12 | | | | | |
| 2008 | 3 | 88 | Geordie Wudrick | Canada | LW | | | | | | | | | | |
| 2008 | 5 | 123 | Andrei Loktionov | Russia | C | 155 | 22 | 26 | 48 | 22 | | | | | |
| 2008 | 6 | 153 | Justin Azevedo | Canada | C | | | | | | | | | | |
| 2008 | 7 | 183 | Garrett Roe | USA | LW | | | | | | | | | | |
| 2009 | 1 | 5 | Brayden Schenn | Canada | C | 1102 | 296 | 428 | 724 | 660 | | | | | |
| 2009 | 2 | 35 | Kyle Clifford | Canada | LW | 753 | 66 | 78 | 144 | 905 | | | | | |
| 2009 | 3 | 84 | Nicolas Deslauriers | Canada | D | 708 | 53 | 53 | 106 | 799 | | | | | |
| 2009 | 4 | 95 | Jean-Francois Berube | Canada | G | 40 | 0 | 1 | 1 | 0 | 12 | 12 | 0 | 4 | 3.50 |
| 2009 | 4 | 96 | Linden Vey | Canada | RW | 138 | 14 | 30 | 44 | 24 | | | | | |
| 2009 | 5 | 126 | David Kolomatis | USA | D | | | | | | | | | | |
| 2009 | 6 | 156 | Michael Pelech | Canada | F | | | | | | | | | | |
| 2009 | 6 | 179 | Brandon Kozun | Canada | RW | 20 | 2 | 2 | 4 | 6 | | | | | |
| 2009 | 7 | 186 | Jordan Nolan | Canada | C | 375 | 24 | 28 | 52 | 347 | | | | | |
| 2009 | 7 | 198 | Nic Dowd | USA | C | 657 | 89 | 108 | 197 | 380 | | | | | |
| 2010 | 1 | 15 | Derek Forbort | USA | D | 552 | 19 | 87 | 106 | 346 | | | | | |
| 2010 | 2 | 47 | Tyler Toffoli | Canada | RW | 969 | 309 | 315 | 624 | 254 | | | | | |
| 2010 | 3 | 70 | Jordan Weal | Canada | C | 218 | 32 | 37 | 69 | 56 | | | | | |
| 2010 | 5 | 148 | Kevin Gravel | USA | D | 139 | 1 | 14 | 15 | 16 | | | | | |
| 2010 | 6 | 158 | Maxim Kitsyn | Russia | LW | | | | | | | | | | |
| 2011 | 2 | 49 | Christopher Gibson | Finland | G | 16 | 0 | 0 | 0 | 0 | 4 | 5 | 0 | 3 | 3.33 |
| 2011 | 3 | 80 | Andy Andreoff | Canada | C | 188 | 14 | 13 | 27 | 225 | | | | | |
| 2011 | 3 | 82 | Nick Shore | USA | C | 299 | 18 | 41 | 59 | 98 | | | | | |
| 2011 | 4 | 110 | Michael Mersch | USA | LW | 17 | 1 | 2 | 3 | 0 | | | | | |
| 2011 | 5 | 140 | Joel Lowry | Canada | LW | | | | | | | | | | |
| 2011 | 7 | 200 | Michael Schumacher | Sweden | LW | | | | | | | | | | |
| 2012 | 1 | 30 | Tanner Pearson | Canada | LW | 778 | 157 | 170 | 327 | 265 | | | | | |
| 2012 | 4 | 121 | Nikolai Prokhorkin | Russia | LW | 43 | 4 | 10 | 14 | 6 | | | | | |
| 2012 | 5 | 151 | Colin Miller | Canada | D | 590 | 43 | 140 | 183 | 368 | | | | | |
| 2012 | 6 | 171 | Tomas Hyka | Czech Republic | RW | 27 | 2 | 5 | 7 | 2 | | | | | |
| 2012 | 6 | 181 | Paul LaDue | USA | D | 70 | 5 | 13 | 18 | 22 | | | | | |
| 2012 | 7 | 211 | Nick Ebert | USA | D | | | | | | | | | | |
| 2013 | 2 | 37 | Valentin Zykov | Russia | LW | 55 | 7 | 10 | 17 | 10 | | | | | |
| 2013 | 4 | 103 | Justin Auger | Canada | RW | 2 | 0 | 0 | 0 | 0 | | | | | |
| 2013 | 4 | 118 | Hudson Fasching | USA | RW | 175 | 17 | 23 | 40 | 30 | | | | | |
| 2013 | 5 | 146 | Patrik Bartosak | Czech Republic | G | | | | | | | | | | |
| 2013 | 5 | 148 | Jonny Brodzinski | USA | RW | 264 | 33 | 38 | 71 | 56 | | | | | |
| 2013 | 6 | 178 | Zachary Leslie | Canada | D | | | | | | | | | | |
| 2013 | 7 | 191 | Dominik Kubalik | Czech Republic | LW | 357 | 93 | 83 | 176 | 93 | | | | | |
| 2014 | 1 | 29 | Adrian Kempe | Sweden | C | 711 | 230 | 244 | 474 | 429 | | | | | |
| 2014 | 2 | 50 | Roland McKeown | Canada | D | 16 | 0 | 3 | 3 | 27 | | | | | |
| 2014 | 2 | 60 | Alex Lintuniemi | Finland | D | | | | | | | | | | |
| 2014 | 3 | 90 | Michael Amadio | Canada | C | 522 | 83 | 91 | 174 | 107 | | | | | |
| 2014 | 4 | 120 | Steven Johnson | USA | D | | | | | | | | | | |
| 2014 | 5 | 150 | Alec Dillon | Canada | G | | | | | | | | | | |
| 2014 | 6 | 157 | Jake Marchment | Canada | C | | | | | | | | | | |
| 2014 | 6 | 180 | Matthew Mistele | Canada | LW | | | | | | | | | | |
| 2014 | 7 | 209 | Spencer Watson | Canada | RW | | | | | | | | | | |
| 2014 | 7 | 210 | Jacob Middleton | Canada | D | 381 | 24 | 70 | 94 | 360 | | | | | |
| 2015 | 2 | 43 | Erik Cernak | Slovakia | D | 502 | 26 | 94 | 120 | 441 | | | | | |
| 2015 | 3 | 74 | Alexander Dergachyov | Russia | C | | | | | | | | | | |
| 2015 | 4 | 99 | Austin Wagner | Canada | LW | 178 | 23 | 19 | 42 | 70 | | | | | |
| 2015 | 5 | 134 | Matt Schmalz | Canada | RW | | | | | | | | | | |
| 2015 | 7 | 187 | Chaz Reddekopp | Canada | D | | | | | | | | | | |
| 2015 | 7 | 194 | Matt Roy | United States | D | 517 | 29 | 120 | 149 | 155 | | | | | |
| 2016 | 2 | 51 | Kale Clague | Canada | D | 94 | 2 | 19 | 21 | 52 | | | | | |
| 2016 | 4 | 112 | Jacob Moverare | Sweden | D | 109 | 2 | 9 | 11 | 18 | | | | | |
| 2016 | 5 | 142 | Michael Eyssimont | United States | C | 269 | 33 | 41 | 74 | 261 | | | | | |
| 2016 | 7 | 202 | Jacob Friend | Canada | D | | | | | | | | | | |
| 2017 | 1 | 11 | Gabriel Vilardi | Canada | C | 352 | 120 | 124 | 244 | 88 | | | | | |
| 2017 | 2 | 41 | Jaret Anderson-Dolan | Canada | C | 134 | 15 | 14 | 29 | 22 | | | | | |
| 2017 | 3 | 72 | Matt Villalta | Canada | G | 3 | 0 | 0 | 0 | 0 | 0 | 1 | 1 | 0 | 4.17 |
| 2017 | 4 | 103 | Mikey Anderson | United States | D | 425 | 21 | 81 | 102 | 146 | | | | | |
| 2017 | 4 | 118 | Markus Phillips | Canada | D | | | | | | | | | | |
| 2017 | 5 | 134 | Cole Hults | United States | D | | | | | | | | | | |
| 2017 | 5 | 138 | Drake Rymsha | United States | C | 1 | 0 | 0 | 0 | 0 | | | | | |
| 2018 | 1 | 20 | Rasmus Kupari | Finland | C | 217 | 14 | 24 | 38 | 52 | | | | | |
| 2018 | 2 | 51 | Akil Thomas | Canada | C | 32 | 4 | 3 | 7 | 9 | | | | | |
| 2018 | 3 | 82 | Bulat Shafigullin | Russia | LW | | | | | | | | | | |
| 2018 | 4 | 113 | Aidan Dudas | Canada | C | | | | | | | | | | |
| 2018 | 5 | 144 | David Hrenak | Slovakia | G | | | | | | | | | | |
| 2018 | 6 | 165 | Johan Sodergran | Sweden | RW | | | | | | | | | | |
| 2018 | 6 | 175 | Jacob Ingham | Canada | G | | | | | | | | | | |
| 2019 | 1 | 5 | Alex Turcotte | United States | C | 162 | 13 | 30 | 43 | 54 | | | | | |
| 2019 | 1 | 22 | Tobias Björnfot | Sweden | D | 153 | 3 | 16 | 19 | 32 | | | | | |
| 2019 | 2 | 33 | Arthur Kaliyev | United States | RW | 204 | 38 | 38 | 76 | 65 | | | | | |
| 2019 | 2 | 50 | Samuel Fagemo | Sweden | LW | 21 | 3 | 1 | 4 | 0 | | | | | |
| 2019 | 3 | 87 | Lukas Parik | Czech Republic | G | | | | | | | | | | |
| 2019 | 4 | 95 | Jordan Spence | Canada | D | 253 | 15 | 77 | 92 | 52 | | | | | |
| 2019 | 4 | 119 | Kim Nousiainen | Finland | D | | | | | | | | | | |
| 2019 | 6 | 157 | Braden Doyle | United States | D | | | | | | | | | | |
| 2019 | 7 | 188 | Andre Lee | Sweden | LW | 26 | 2 | 3 | 5 | 11 | | | | | |
| 2020 | 1 | 2 | Quinton Byfield | Canada | C | 339 | 75 | 116 | 191 | 186 | | | | | |
| 2020 | 2 | 35 | Helge Grans | Sweden | D | 6 | 0 | 1 | 1 | 2 | | | | | |
| 2020 | 2 | 45 | Brock Faber | United States | D | 242 | 33 | 94 | 127 | 88 | | | | | |
| 2020 | 3 | 66 | Kasper Simontaival | Finland | RW | | | | | | | | | | |
| 2020 | 3 | 83 | Alex Laferriere | United States | RW | 240 | 52 | 57 | 109 | 84 | | | | | |
| 2020 | 4 | 112 | Juho Markkanen | Finland | G | | | | | | | | | | |
| 2020 | 5 | 128 | Martin Chromiak | Slovakia | RW | | | | | | | | | | |
| 2020 | 5 | 140 | Ben Meehan | United States | D | | | | | | | | | | |
| 2020 | 7 | 190 | Aatu Jamsen | Finland | RW | | | | | | | | | | |
| 2021 | 1 | 8 | Brandt Clarke | Canada | D | 185 | 15 | 66 | 81 | 125 | | | | | |
| 2021 | 2 | 42 | Francesco Pinelli | Canada | C | | | | | | | | | | |
| 2021 | 2 | 59 | Samuel Helenius | Finland | C | 103 | 9 | 7 | 16 | 75 | | | | | |
| 2021 | 3 | 84 | Kirill Kirsanov | Russia | D | | | | | | | | | | |
| 2022 | 2 | 51 | Jack Hughes | United States | C | | | | | | | | | | |
| 2022 | 4 | 103 | Kenny Connors | United States | C | 2 | 0 | 0 | 0 | 0 | | | | | |
| 2022 | 4 | 116 | Angus Booth | Canada | D | 1 | 1 | 0 | 1 | 0 | | | | | |
| 2022 | 5 | 148 | Otto Salin | Finland | D | | | | | | | | | | |
| 2022 | 6 | 169 | Jared Wright | United States | RW | 23 | 0 | 4 | 4 | 4 | | | | | |
| 2022 | 6 | 180 | Jack Sparkes | Canada | D | | | | | | | | | | |
| 2022 | 7 | 215 | Kaleb Lawrence | Canada | C | | | | | | | | | | |
| 2023 | 2 | 54 | Jakub Dvorak | Czech Republic | D | | | | | | | | | | |
| 2023 | 3 | 78 | Koehn Ziemmer | Canada | RW | | | | | | | | | | |
| 2023 | 4 | 118 | Hampton Slukynsky | United States | G | | | | | | | | | | |
| 2023 | 5 | 150 | Matthew Mania | United States | D | | | | | | | | | | |
| 2023 | 6 | 182 | Ryan Conmy | United States | RW | | | | | | | | | | |
| 2024 | 1 | 26 | Liam Greentree | Canada | RW | | | | | | | | | | |
| 2024 | 2 | 57 | Carter George | Canada | G | | | | | | | | | | |
| 2024 | 6 | 164 | Jared Woolley | Canada | D | | | | | | | | | | |
| 2024 | 7 | 198 | James Reeder | United States | RW | | | | | | | | | | |
| 2025 | 1 | 31 | Henry Brzustewicz | United States | D | | | | | | | | | | |
| 2025 | 2 | 59 | Vojtech Cihar | Czech Republic | LW | | | | | | | | | | |
| 2025 | 3 | 88 | Kristian Epperson | United States | LW | | | | | | | | | | |
| 2025 | 4 | 120 | Caeden Herrington | United States | D | | | | | | | | | | |
| 2025 | 4 | 125 | Jimmy Lombardi | Canada | C | | | | | | | | | | |
| 2025 | 5 | 152 | Petteri Rimpinen | Finland | G | | | | | | | | | | |
| 2025 | 6 | 184 | Jan Chovan | Slovakia | C | | | | | | | | | | |
| 2025 | 7 | 196 | Brendan McMorrow | United States | LW | | | | | | | | | | |
| 2025 | 7 | 216 | Will Sharpe | Canada | D | | | | | | | | | | |
| 2026 | 1 | 19 | Elton Hermansson | Sweden | RW | | | | | | | | | | |
| 2026 | 2 | 46 | Liam Lefebvre | Canada | C | | | | | | | | | | |
| 2026 | 2 | 49 | Adam Goljer | Slovakia | D | | | | | | | | | | |
| 2026 | 3 | 80 | Blake Zielinski | United States | C | | | | | | | | | | |
| 2026 | 3 | 89 | Yegor Rybkin | Russia | G | | | | | | | | | | |
| 2026 | 4 | 103 | Thomas Vandenberg | Canada | C | | | | | | | | | | |
| 2026 | 5 | 145 | Vertti Svensk | Finland | D | | | | | | | | | | |
| 2026 | 5 | 153 | Giorgos Pantelas | Canada | D | | | | | | | | | | |
| 2026 | 6 | 177 | Alex Kostov | Canada | RW | | | | | | | | | | |
| 2026 | 7 | 209 | Tobias Krestan | Germany | RW | | | | | | | | | | |
| 2026 | 7 | 223 | Lucas Ambrosio | Canada | D | | | | | | | | | | |

== See also ==
- List of Los Angeles Kings players
- 1967 NHL Expansion Draft
