= Terry Caffery =

Canadian ice hockey player (1949–2022)

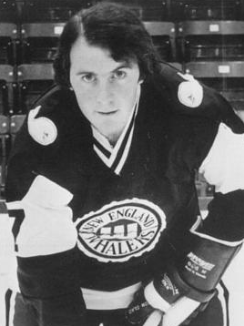
- Born: April 1, 1949 Toronto, Ontario, Canada
- Died: August 3, 2022 (aged 73) Thornhill, Ontario, Canada
- Height: 5 ft 9 in (175 cm)
- Weight: 165 lb (75 kg; 11 st 11 lb)
- Position: Centre
- Shot: Right
- Played for: Chicago Black Hawks; Minnesota North Stars; New England Whalers; Calgary Cowboys
- National team: Canada
- NHL draft: 3rd overall, 1966; Chicago Black Hawks
- Playing career: 1969–1976

Terrance Michael Caffery (April 1, 1949 – August 3, 2022) was a Canadian professional ice hockey player. He played for the New England Whalers and the Calgary Cowboys of the World Hockey Association, as well as for the Chicago Black Hawks and the Minnesota North Stars of the National Hockey League between 1969 and 1976.

== Playing career ==
After an impressive junior career with the Toronto Marlboros of the Ontario Hockey Association, during which Caffery was drafted third overall by the Black Hawks in the 1966 NHL Amateur Draft behind Barry Gibbs and Brad Park, he played a season for the Canadian National team. He made his NHL debut with the Black Hawks in 1969, but spent most of the next three seasons in the minor leagues with the Dallas Black Hawks of the Central Hockey League and the Cleveland Barons of the American Hockey League, averaging over a point a game and winning the AHL's Dudley "Red" Garrett Memorial Award as rookie of the year in 1972.

The following season Caffery signed with the Whalers and met with his greatest success as a pro, scoring 100 points to finish in the WHA's top ten in the loop's inaugural season and proving a key component in the Whalers' league championship that year. He was awarded the Lou Kaplan Trophy as the league's rookie of the year. However, he suffered a knee injury late that year that, despite him starring in the playoffs, forced him to miss the entire 1974 season. He returned to play for the Whalers the year after that, but remained seriously impaired, and retired during the 1976 season.

His brother was Jack Caffery, a two-sport player who also played minor league baseball in the Milwaukee Braves organization and was credited with inventing the backward grip for faceoffs.

Caffery died on August 3, 2022, in his home at Thornhill, Ontario.

== Career statistics ==
=== Regular season and playoffs ===
| | | | Regular season | | | | | Playoffs |
| Season | Team | League | GP | G | A | Pts | PIM | GP | G | A | Pts | PIM |
|---|---|---|---|---|---|---|---|---|---|---|---|---|
| 1965–66 | Toronto Marlboros | OHA | 43 | 14 | 25 | 39 | 36 | 13 | 3 | 6 | 9 | 18 |
| 1966–67 | Toronto Marlboros | OHA | 39 | 16 | 29 | 45 | 29 | 17 | 10 | 15 | 25 | 10 |
| 1966–67 | Toronto Marlboros | M-Cup | — | — | — | — | — | 9 | 4 | 13 | 17 | 4 |
| 1967–68 | Toronto Marlboros | OHA | 48 | 36 | 47 | 83 | 64 | 2 | 0 | 0 | 0 | 0 |
| 1968–69 | Ottawa Nationals | OHA Sr | 5 | 4 | 8 | 12 | 0 | — | — | — | — | — |
| 1969–70 | Chicago Black Hawks | NHL | 6 | 0 | 0 | 0 | 0 | — | — | — | — | — |
| 1969–70 | Dallas Black Hawks | CHL | 42 | 12 | 28 | 40 | 4 | — | — | — | — | — |
| 1970–71 | Dallas Black Hawks | CHL | 40 | 13 | 34 | 47 | 22 | — | — | — | — | — |
| 1970–71 | Minnesota North Stars | NHL | 8 | 0 | 0 | 0 | 0 | 1 | 0 | 0 | 0 | 0 |
| 1971–72 | Cleveland Barons | AHL | 65 | 29 | 59 | 88 | 18 | 6 | 1 | 3 | 4 | 0 |
| 1972–73 | New England Whalers | WHA | 74 | 39 | 61 | 100 | 14 | 8 | 3 | 7 | 10 | 0 |
| 1974–75 | New England Whalers | WHA | 67 | 15 | 37 | 52 | 12 | — | — | — | — | — |
| 1975–76 | New England Whalers | WHA | 2 | 0 | 0 | 0 | 0 | — | — | — | — | — |
| 1975–76 | Calgary Cowboys | WHA | 21 | 5 | 13 | 18 | 4 | — | — | — | — | — |
| WHA totals | | | 164 | 59 | 111 | 170 | 30 | 8 | 3 | 7 | 10 | 0 |
| NHL totals | | | 14 | 0 | 0 | 0 | 0 | 1 | 0 | 0 | 0 | 0 |

=== International ===
| Year | Team | Event | GP | G | A | Pts | PIM |
|---|---|---|---|---|---|---|---|
| 1969 | Canada | WC | 10 | 4 | 4 | 8 | 8 |
| Senior totals | | | 10 | 4 | 4 | 8 | 8 |

== Awards ==
1972: Dudley "Red" Garrett Memorial Award

| Preceded by Andy Culligan | Chicago Black Hawks first-round draft pick 1966 | Succeeded by Bob Tombari |
