= Ron Barkwell =

Canadian ice hockey player (born 1946)

- Born: December 14, 1946 (age 79) Moose Jaw, Saskatchewan, Canada
- Height: 5 ft 10 in (178 cm)
- Weight: 175 lb (79 kg; 12 st 7 lb)
- Position: Centre/Right wing
- Played for: Port Huron Flags; Johnstown Jets; Nelson Maple Leafs
- NHL draft: 9th overall, 1967; Detroit Red Wings
- Playing career: 1967–1973

Ron Barkwell (born December 14, 1946) is a former ice hockey centre who was drafted 1st (9th overall) by the Detroit Red Wings, but never played in the National Hockey League.

== Playing career ==
Barkwell starting play in his hometown of Moose Jaw with the Moose Jaw Canucks of the TBJHL. He was soon moved to the Flin Flon Bombers of the MJHL where he was a proficient at both centre and right wing. The Detroit Red Wings took a gamble by selecting Barkwell with their first pick in the 1967 NHL entry draft. The Wings hoped that Barkwell would continue to develop and become an active member of the organization. However, Barkwell would never play in the NHL. He joined the Johnstown Jets of the Eastern Hockey League in 1967 and only put up 8 points in 21 games. The following season he joined the Port Huron Flags of the International Hockey League and only put up 3 points in 18 games. He was quickly downgraded to the WIHL, where he joined the Nelson Maple Leafs. He continued to disappoint and was dropped after the 1968–69 season. Barkwell would retire from hockey, having never found a way to excel in the higher leagues.

Preceded by Steve Atkinson	Detroit Red Wings first-round draft pick 1967	Succeeded by Steve Andrascik
