= Pulliainen =

Pulliainen is a Finnish surname. Notable people with the surname include:

- Erkki Pulliainen (1938–2022), Finnish biologist and politician
- Vesa Pulliainen (1957–2010), Finnish footballer
- Tuukka Pulliainen (born 1984), Finnish professional ice hockey forward
