= Tim Young (ice hockey) =

Canadian ice hockey player (born 1955)

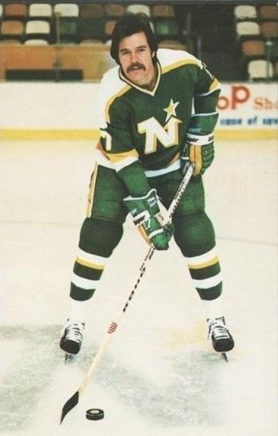
- Born: February 22, 1955 (age 71) Scarborough, Ontario, Canada
- Height: 6 ft 1 in (185 cm)
- Weight: 190 lb (86 kg; 13 st 8 lb)
- Position: Centre
- Shot: Right
- Played for: Minnesota North Stars; Winnipeg Jets; Philadelphia Flyers
- NHL draft: 16th overall, 1975; Los Angeles Kings
- WHA draft: 13th overall, 1974; New England Whalers
- Playing career: 1975–1986

Timothy Michael Young (born February 22, 1955) is a Canadian former professional ice hockey forward who played ten seasons in the National Hockey League (NHL) for the Minnesota North Stars, Winnipeg Jets and Philadelphia Flyers.

== Playing career ==
As a youth, Young played in the 1967 Quebec International Pee-Wee Hockey Tournament with the Toronto Shopsy's minor ice hockey team.

=== Junior hockey ===
Young began his junior hockey career with the Ottawa 67's of the Ontario Hockey Association (OHA) in 1973–74. Young had a very solid rookie season, earning 106 points in 69 games, helping the 67's to the playoffs. In seven playoff games, Young had five points. After the season, Young was drafted by the New England Whalers in the 1974 WHA Amateur Draft with the 13th overall pick.

Rather than join the Whalers, Young returned to Ottawa for the 1974–75 season, in which he led the league with 106 assists, and the second highest point total at 163, behind only Bruce Boudreau of the Toronto Marlboros. In the playoffs, Young had seven points in five games as the 67's lost to the Sudbury Wolves in the first round. Young was then selected 16th overall by the Los Angeles Kings in the 1975 NHL entry draft. He would not stay a King for long, as on August 15, 1975, the Kings traded Young to the Minnesota North Stars for Minnesota's second round choice in the 1976 NHL entry draft.

=== Professional career ===
==== Minnesota North Stars ====
Young began the 1975–76 season with the New Haven Nighthawks of the American Hockey League (AHL), earning 20 points in 13 games before being called up to the North Stars. He had a solid rookie season in Minnesota, earning 51 points in 63 games to lead the team in scoring. The North Stars failed to reach the playoffs.

Young had a breakout season in 1976–77, as he once again led the North Stars in scoring with a career high 95 points, as he scored 29 goals with 66 assists, and played in the 30th National Hockey League All-Star Game. Young helped the North Stars reach the preliminary round of the playoffs, however, Minnesota was swept in two games by the Buffalo Sabres. Young had a goal and an assist in the series.

The 1977–78 season saw Young's numbers slip, as he recorded 58 points in 78 games, and finished second in team scoring. Minnesota struggled throughout the season, and failed to make the post-season. The 1978–79 season was more of the same, as Young had 56 points in 73 games, as Minnesota once again missed the playoffs.

The highlight of Young's season came on January 15, 1979 when he scored five goals in a game at the New York Rangers. It was his first career hat trick and he also added an assist for a six-point night. In doing so, he became the second player in NHL history to score five goals on five shots.

In 1979–80, Young had his highest point total since 1976-77, as he earned 74 points in 77 games, helping the North Stars to a record over .500 for the first time since he joined the team, and a playoff berth. In the post-season, Young had seven points in 15 games, as Minnesota lost in the third round to the Philadelphia Flyers.

In the 1980–81 season he had 66 points in 74 games to finish second in team scoring, as Minnesota made the playoffs again. The North Stars had a long playoff run, advancing to the 1981 Stanley Cup Finals, before losing to the powerful New York Islanders in five games. Young missed some time in the playoffs, however, he had a strong playoff performance, earning 17 points in 12 games.

Young had an injury plagued 1981–82 season, a season in which he was named captain of the North Stars, appearing in 49 games, in which he earned 41 points. In the playoffs, Young had two points in four games. In 1982-83, Young stayed relatively healthy, as he played in 70 games, earning 53 points, however he appeared in only two playoff games, earning two assists.

On August 3, 1983, the North Stars traded Young to the Winnipeg Jets for Craig Levie and Tom Ward.

==== Winnipeg Jets ====
In Young's only season in Winnipeg in 1983–84, he appeared in only 44 games, earning 34 points, as the Jets snuck into the playoffs. Young appeared in only one playoff game, earning an assist.

On October 16, 1984, Young was traded to the Philadelphia Flyers for future considerations.

==== Philadelphia Flyers ====
Injuries continued to take a toll on Young's career, as he split the 1984–85 season between Philadelphia and the Hershey Bears of the AHL. In 20 games with the Flyers, Young had eight points before finishing the season with the Bears. Young was productive with Hershey, earning 48 points in 49 games, however, he decided to retire at the conclusion of the season at the age of 30.

== Career statistics ==
| | | | Regular season | | | | | Playoffs |
| Season | Team | League | GP | G | A | Pts | PIM | GP | G | A | Pts | PIM |
|---|---|---|---|---|---|---|---|---|---|---|---|---|
| 1973–74 | Ottawa 67's | OHA-Jr. | 69 | 45 | 61 | 106 | 161 | 7 | 4 | 1 | 5 | 6 |
| 1974–75 | Ottawa 67's | OMJHL | 70 | 56 | 107 | 163 | 127 | 5 | 3 | 4 | 7 | 8 |
| 1975–76 | New Haven Nighthawks | AHL | 13 | 7 | 13 | 20 | 16 | — | — | — | — | — |
| 1975–76 | Minnesota North Stars | NHL | 63 | 18 | 33 | 51 | 71 | — | — | — | — | — |
| 1976–77 | Minnesota North Stars | NHL | 80 | 29 | 66 | 95 | 58 | 2 | 1 | 1 | 2 | 2 |
| 1977–78 | Minnesota North Stars | NHL | 78 | 23 | 35 | 58 | 64 | — | — | — | — | — |
| 1978–79 | Minnesota North Stars | NHL | 73 | 24 | 32 | 56 | 46 | — | — | — | — | — |
| 1979–80 | Minnesota North Stars | NHL | 77 | 31 | 43 | 74 | 24 | 15 | 2 | 5 | 7 | 4 |
| 1980–81 | Minnesota North Stars | NHL | 74 | 25 | 41 | 66 | 40 | 12 | 3 | 14 | 17 | 9 |
| 1981–82 | Minnesota North Stars | NHL | 49 | 10 | 31 | 41 | 67 | 4 | 1 | 1 | 2 | 10 |
| 1982–83 | Minnesota North Stars | NHL | 70 | 18 | 35 | 53 | 31 | 2 | 0 | 2 | 2 | 2 |
| 1983–84 | Winnipeg Jets | NHL | 44 | 15 | 19 | 34 | 25 | 1 | 0 | 1 | 1 | 0 |
| 1984–85 | Hershey Bears | AHL | 49 | 19 | 29 | 48 | 56 | — | — | — | — | — |
| 1984–85 | Philadelphia Flyers | NHL | 20 | 2 | 6 | 8 | 12 | — | — | — | — | — |
| NHL totals | | | 628 | 195 | 341 | 536 | 438 | 36 | 7 | 24 | 31 | 27 |

| Preceded by Blake Dunlop | New England Whalers first-round draft pick 1974 | Succeeded by Terry McDonald |
| Preceded by Jim McInally | Los Angeles Kings first-round draft pick 1975 | Succeeded by Jay Wells |
| Preceded by Paul Shmyr | Minnesota North Stars captain 1981–82 | Succeeded by Craig Hartsburg |
