= Bob Tombari =

Canadian ice hockey player (born 1946)

- Born: August 2, 1946 Sault Ste. Marie, Ontario, Canada
- Height: 5 ft 11 in (180 cm)
- Weight: 185 lb (84 kg; 13 st 3 lb)
- Position: Left wing
- Shot: Left
- Played for: Muskegon Mohawks (IHL)
- NHL draft: 7th overall, 1967; Chicago Black Hawks
- Playing career: 1967–1978

Bob Tombari (born August 2, 1946) is a Canadian former professional ice hockey left winger. He was drafted in the first round, 7th overall, by the Chicago Black Hawks in the 1967 NHL Amateur Draft. He never played in the National Hockey League, however; he spent his entire professional hockey career in the International Hockey League with the Muskegon Mohawks.

== Career statistics ==
                                            --- Regular season ---  ---- Playoffs ----
Season   Team                        Lge    GP    G    A  Pts  PIM  GP   G   A Pts PIM
--------------------------------------------------------------------------------------
1964-65  Sault Ste. Marie Greyhoun   NOJHA  40   20   25   45   23
1965-66  Sault Ste. Marie Greyhoun   NOJHA   0    0    0    0    0
1967-68  Muskegon Mohawks            IHL    65   19   33   52   67   9   1   5   6   8
1968-69  Muskegon Mohawks            IHL    65   35   46   81   60  11   4   3   7   6
1969-70  Muskegon Mohawks            IHL    72   36   35   71   83   6   5   1   6  17
1970-71  Muskegon Mohawks            IHL    72   26   39   65   69   6   1   2   3   6
1971-72  Muskegon Mohawks            IHL    72   25   42   67   62  11   8   2  10  27
1972-73  Muskegon Mohawks            IHL    74   35   65  100   71  --  --  --  --  --
1973-74  Muskegon Mohawks            IHL    76   22   43   65   55   3   1   2   3   0
1974-75  Muskegon Mohawks            IHL    74   33   55   88   14  12   5   9  14  13
1975-76  Muskegon Mohawks            IHL    78   26   31   57   31   5   1   1   2   2
1976-77  Muskegon Mohawks            IHL    78   12   22   34   51   7   1   4   5   0
1977-78  Muskegon Mohawks            IHL    79   12   25   37   51   6   0   1   1   0
--------------------------------------------------------------------------------------

Preceded by Terry Caffery	Chicago Blackhawks first-round draft pick 1967	Succeeded by John Marks
