= Jude Drouin =

Canadian retired ice hockey forward

- Born: October 28, 1948 (age 77) Murdochville, Quebec, Canada
- Height: 5 ft 10 in (178 cm)
- Weight: 160 lb (73 kg; 11 st 6 lb)
- Position: Centre
- Shot: Right
- Played for: Montreal Canadiens; Minnesota North Stars; New York Islanders; Winnipeg Jets
- NHL draft: 17th overall, 1966; Montreal Canadiens
- Playing career: 1967–1981

Joseph Jude Drouin (born October 28, 1948) is a Canadian former professional ice hockey forward. He helped the New York Islanders reach the NHL playoff semifinals three-straight seasons from 1975 to 1977.

== Early life ==
Drouin was born in Murdochville, Quebec. As a youth, he played in the 1961 Quebec International Pee-Wee Hockey Tournament with Murdochville. Drouin was drafted in the third round (17th overall) of the 1966 NHL Amateur Draft by the Montreal Canadiens. He played for their junior team, the Montreal Junior Canadiens of the Ontario Hockey Association (OHA) in the 1966–67 season, playing in 47 games and recording 32 goals and 36 assists.

== Career ==
Drouin turned professional with the Houston Apollos of the Central Hockey League (CHL), scoring 68 points in 60 games, and earning his first NHL playing time with the Canadiens in the 1968–69 season. The 1969–70 season found Drouin in the minors again, this time for the powerhouse Nova Scotia Voyageurs, where he dominated with 106 points in 65 games, winning the Dudley "Red" Garrett Memorial Award for rookie of the year and leading the American Hockey League (AHL) in scoring.

With no place for him in the powerful Montreal lineup, Drouin was traded to the Minnesota North Stars for the 1970–71 season, and he became one of the team's early stars, scoring 68 points and adding 12 points in 12 games in the playoffs. Drouin was a mainstay of the North Stars for four and a half seasons in all, his best season coming in 1972–73, when he scored career highs of 27 goals and 73 points.

His production fell thereafter, and he was traded in mid-season in 1975 to the New York Islanders. The trade rejuvenated Drouin, and he was an effective two-way player for three seasons with the up-and-coming Islanders.

Drouin's production sharply dropped in the 1977–78 season, and disgruntled with his declining role with the Islanders, he sat out the following season in order to become a free agent. He signed with the Winnipeg Jets thereafter, but retired early in the 1980–81 season.

== Career statistics ==
=== Regular season and playoffs ===
			Regular season					Playoffs
Season	Team	League	GP	G	A	Pts	PIM	GP	G	A	Pts	PIM
1966–67	Montreal Junior Canadiens	OHA	47	32	36	68	64	—	—	—	—	—
1967–68	Houston Apollos	CHL	68	22	38	60	59	—	—	—	—	—
1968–69	Houston Apollos	CHL	53	23	31	54	117	3	1	1	2	23
1968–69	Montreal Canadiens	NHL	9	0	1	1	0	—	—	—	—	—
1969–70	Montreal Voyageurs	AHL	65	37	69	106	88	8	0	6	6	2
1969–70	Montreal Canadiens	NHL	3	0	0	0	2	—	—	—	—	—
1970–71	Minnesota North Stars	NHL	75	16	52	68	49	12	5	7	12	10
1971–72	Minnesota North Stars	NHL	63	13	43	56	31	7	4	4	8	6
1972–73	Minnesota North Stars	NHL	78	27	46	73	61	6	1	3	4	0
1973–74	Minnesota North Stars	NHL	65	19	24	43	30	—	—	—	—	—
1974–75	Minnesota North Stars	NHL	38	4	18	22	16	—	—	—	—	—
1974–75	New York Islanders	NHL	40	14	18	32	6	17	6	12	18	6
1975–76	New York Islanders	NHL	76	21	41	62	58	13	6	9	15	0
1976–77	New York Islanders	NHL	78	24	29	53	27	12	5	6	11	6
1977–78	New York Islanders	NHL	56	5	17	22	12	5	0	0	0	5
1979–80	Winnipeg Jets	NHL	78	8	16	24	50	—	—	—	—	—
1980–81	Winnipeg Jets	NHL	7	0	0	0	4	—	—	—	—	—
NHL totals			666	151	305	456	346	72	27	41	68	33
