= Phil Myre =

Canadian ice hockey player (born 1948)

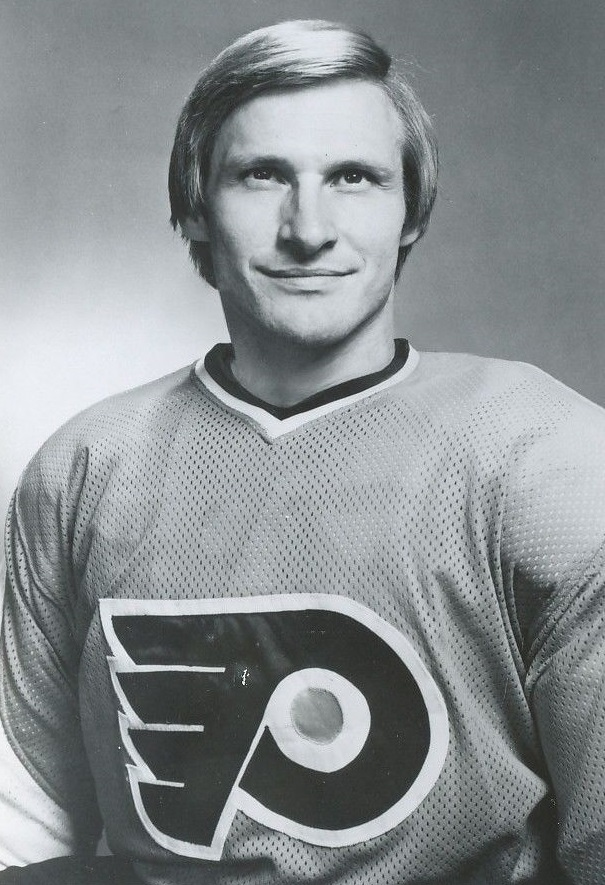
- Myre in 1980
- Born: November 1, 1948 (age 77) Sainte-Anne-de-Bellevue, Quebec, Canada
- Height: 6 ft 1 in (185 cm)
- Weight: 185 lb (84 kg; 13 st 3 lb)
- Position: Goaltender
- Caught: Left
- Played for: Montreal Canadiens; Atlanta Flames; St. Louis Blues; Philadelphia Flyers; Colorado Rockies; Buffalo Sabres
- National team: Canada
- NHL draft: 5th overall, 1966; Montreal Canadiens
- Playing career: 1968–1984

Philippe Louis Myre (born November 1, 1948) is a Canadian former professional ice hockey goaltender who played 14 seasons in the National Hockey League (NHL) for the Montreal Canadiens, Atlanta Flames, St. Louis Blues, Philadelphia Flyers, Colorado Rockies and Buffalo Sabres. He featured in the 1980 Stanley Cup Final with the Flyers.

== Playing career ==
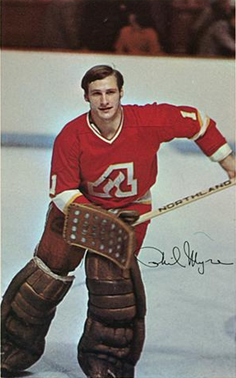
Phil Myre for Atlanta Flames in 1972

Originally selected by the Montreal Canadiens in the 1966 NHL entry draft, Myre played parts of three seasons with the Canadiens. In 1970-71, because of an injury to Rogatien Vachon, he played 30 regular season games and dressed for 70. However, during the playoffs, the Canadiens went with rookie Ken Dryden. When Montreal won the Cup, Myre was included in the team picture and was given a Stanley Cup ring, but his name was left off the Cup, even though he qualified, because he did not dress for any playoff games.

He was claimed by the Atlanta Flames in the 1972 NHL Expansion Draft, where he played for almost six seasons. Although Myre began as the starting goaltender for the expansion club, he spent most of his time in Atlanta sharing the net equally with Dan Bouchard. He was traded along with Curt Bennett and Barry Gibbs from the Flames to the Blues for Bob MacMillan, Dick Redmond, Yves Bélanger and a second‐round selection in the 1979 NHL entry draft (23rd overall–Mike Perovich) on December 12, 1977. Myre also played for the Philadelphia Flyers, Colorado Rockies, and Buffalo Sabres.

In the 1979–80 NHL season, Myre and rookie goalie Pete Peeters backstopped the Flyers through an undefeated streak of 35 games, both an NHL and a professional sports record. Myre saw some action in the playoffs that year, including a game three 6-2 loss in the Final, which the Flyers lost to the New York Islanders in six games.

After his playing career ended in 1984, Myre was a goaltending coach for the Los Angeles Kings, Detroit Red Wings and Florida Panthers.

== Career statistics ==
=== Regular season and playoffs ===
			Regular season									Playoffs
Season	Team	League	GP	W	L	T	MIN	GA	SO	GAA	SV%	GP	W	L	MIN	GA	SO	GAA	SV%
1963–64	Victoriaville Bruins	QJHL	—	—	—	—	—	—	—	—	—	2	1	1	120	12	0	6.00	—
1963–64	Victoriaville Bruins	M-Cup	—	—	—	—	—	—	—	—	—	1	0	1	60	8	0	8.00	—
1964–65	Victoriaville Bruins	QJHL	21	14	7	0	1,260	82	3	3.90	—	9	7	2	540	36	0	4.00	—
1964–65	Victoriaville Bruins	M-Cup	—	—	—	—	—	—	—	—	—	3	0	3	180	24	0	8.00	—
1965–66	Shawinigan Bruins	QJHL	44	38	6	0	2,620	136	1	3.11	—	12	8	4	730	34	3	2.79	—
1965–66	Shawinigan Bruins	M-Cup	—	—	—	—	—	—	—	—	—	15	11	4	900	41	0	2.73	—
1966–67	Niagara Falls Flyers	OHA-Jr.	34	—	—	—	2,010	135	1	4.03	—	9	—	—	540	44	0	4.89	—
1967–68	Niagara Falls Flyers	OHA-Jr.	50	—	—	—	2,970	153	4	3.09	—	19	—	—	1,140	72	0	3.79	—
1967–68	Niagara Falls Flyers	M-Cup	—	—	—	—	—	—	—	—	—	10	7	3	621	34	1	3.29	—
1968–69	Houston Apollos	CHL	53	24	19	10	3,150	150	2	2.86	—	2	0	2	119	7	0	3.53	—
1969–70	Montreal Canadiens	NHL	10	4	3	2	503	19	0	2.27	.923	—	—	—	—	—	—	—	—
1969–70	Montreal Voyageurs	AHL	15	—	—	—	900	37	0	2.47	—	—	—	—	—	—	—	—	—
1970–71	Montreal Canadiens	NHL	30	13	11	4	1,677	87	1	3.11	.904	—	—	—	—	—	—	—	—
1971–72	Montreal Canadiens	NHL	9	4	5	0	528	32	0	3.64	.884	—	—	—	—	—	—	—	—
1972–73	Atlanta Flames	NHL	46	16	23	5	2,736	138	2	3.03	.902	—	—	—	—	—	—	—	—
1973–74	Atlanta Flames	NHL	36	11	16	6	2,020	112	0	3.33	.889	3	0	3	186	13	0	4.19	.885
1974–75	Atlanta Flames	NHL	40	14	16	10	2,400	114	5	2.85	.909	—	—	—	—	—	—	—	—
1975–76	Atlanta Flames	NHL	37	16	16	4	2,129	123	1	3.47	.880	—	—	—	—	—	—	—	—
1976–77	Atlanta Flames	NHL	43	17	17	7	2,422	124	3	3.07	.886	2	1	1	120	5	0	2.50	.891
1977–78	Atlanta Flames	NHL	9	2	7	0	523	43	0	4.93	.839	—	—	—	—	—	—	—	—
1977–78	St. Louis Blues	NHL	44	11	25	8	2,620	159	1	3.64	.883	—	—	—	—	—	—	—	—
1978–79	St. Louis Blues	NHL	39	9	22	8	2,259	163	1	4.33	.864	—	—	—	—	—	—	—	—
1979–80	Philadelphia Flyers	NHL	41	18	7	15	2,367	141	0	3.57	.875	6	5	1	384	16	1	2.50	.920
1980–81	Philadelphia Flyers	NHL	16	6	5	4	900	61	0	4.07	.864	—	—	—	—	—	—	—	—
1980–81	Colorado Rockies	NHL	10	3	6	1	580	33	0	3.41	.884	—	—	—	—	—	—	—	—
1981–82	Colorado Rockies	NHL	24	2	17	2	1,256	112	0	5.35	.839	—	—	—	—	—	—	—	—
1981–82	Fort Worth Texans	CHL	10	4	5	1	615	40	0	3.90	—	—	—	—	—	—	—	—	—
1982–83	Buffalo Sabres	NHL	5	3	2	0	300	21	0	4.20	.862	1	0	0	57	7	0	7.37	.759
1982–83	Rochester Americans	AHL	43	28	8	5	2,541	156	0	3.68	.866	—	—	—	—	—	—	—	—
1983–84	Rochester Americans	AHL	33	19	9	1	1,803	104	4	3.46	—	—	—	—	—	—	—	—	—
NHL totals			439	149	198	76	25,220	1,482	14	3.53	.884	12	6	5	747	41	1	3.29	.895

=== International ===
Year	Team	Event	GP	W	L	T	MIN	GA	SO	GAA
1981	Canada	WC	7	2	5	0	359	26	0	4.35

"Myre's stats". The Goaltender Home Page.

Preceded by Pierre Bouchard	Montreal Canadiens first-round draft pick 1966	Succeeded by Elgin McCann
