= Rick Pagnutti =

Canadian ice hockey player (born 1946)

- Born: November 14, 1946 (age 79) Sudbury, Ontario, Canada
- Height: 6 ft 1 in (185 cm)
- Weight: 185 lb (84 kg; 13 st 3 lb)
- Position: Defence
- Played for: AHL; Springfield Kings; Rochester Americans; WHL; Salt Lake Golden Eagles; CHL; Oklahoma City Blazers; IHL; Fort Wayne Komets; NAHL; Broome Dusters
- NHL draft: 1st overall, 1967; Los Angeles Kings
- Playing career: 1967–1977

Rick Pagnutti (born November 14, 1946) is a Canadian former professional ice hockey player who was drafted first overall in the 1967 NHL Amateur Draft by the Los Angeles Kings but never played in the NHL.

Pagnutti spent a ten-year career in the minor leagues, primarily for the Rochester Americans and Springfield Kings of the American Hockey League. He won the Governor's Trophy as the top defenceman in the International Hockey League in 1972. His son Matt Pagnutti played college hockey in the NCAA ranks and professionally in the ECHL.

== Career statistics ==
			Regular season					Playoffs
Season	Team	League	GP	G	A	Pts	PIM	GP	G	A	Pts	PIM
1963–64	Sudbury Wolves	NOJHA	36	8	16	24	49	5	0	2	2	6
1964–65	Sudbury Wolves	NOJHA	37	3	21	24	73	—	—	—	—	—
1965–66	Sudbury Wolves	NOJHA	7	0	0	0	10	—	—	—	—	—
1965–66	Garson Falconbridge Native Sons	NOJHA	21	14	13	27	37	—	—	—	—	—
1966–67	Garson Falconbridge Native Sons	NOJHA	39	30	50	80	92	7	2	11	13	9
1967–68	Springfield Kings	AHL	54	4	13	17	20	4	0	1	1	8
1968–69	Springfield Kings	AHL	65	4	14	18	63	—	—	—	—	—
1969–70	Salt Lake Golden Eagles	WHL	60	4	9	13	44	—	—	—	—	—
1969–70	Oklahoma City Blazers	CHL	3	0	0	0	0	—	—	—	—	—
1970–71	Fort Wayne Komets	IHL	57	9	23	32	45	5	1	2	3	2
1971–72	Fort Wayne Komets	IHL	64	13	45	58	86	8	1	2	3	6
1972–73	Rochester Americans	AHL	72	18	37	55	64	6	3	2	5	4
1973–74	Rochester Americans	AHL	68	11	43	54	57	6	0	2	2	6
1974–75	Rochester Americans	AHL	74	12	40	52	59	12	3	5	8	16
1975–76	Rochester Americans	AHL	63	4	29	33	46	7	0	2	2	9
1976–77	Binghamton Dusters	NAHL	68	8	44	52	50	10	2	4	6	5
AHL totals			396	53	176	229	309	35	6	12	18	43

Preceded by Barry Gibbs	NHL first overall draft pick 1967	Succeeded by Michel Plasse
Preceded by None	Los Angeles Kings first-round draft pick 1967	Succeeded by Jim McInally
