= Bob Dickson (ice hockey) =

Canadian ice hockey player (born 1947)

- Born: November 1, 1947 (age 78) Gananoque, Ontario, Canada
- Height: 6 ft 1 in (185 cm)
- Weight: 185 lb (84 kg; 13 st 3 lb)
- Position: Left wing
- Played for: Oshawa Generals (OHL); Fort Wayne Komets (IHL); Salem Rebels (EHL); Kingston Aces (OHASr)
- NHL draft: 6th overall, 1967; New York Rangers
- Playing career: 1965–1974

Bob Dickson (born November 11, 1947) is a Canadian retired professional ice hockey player. He was selected by the New York Rangers in the first round (sixth overall) of the 1967 NHL Amateur Draft, but never played in the National Hockey League.

Preceded by Brad Park	New York Rangers first-round draft pick 1967	Succeeded by Andre Dupont
