= Jim McInally (ice hockey) =

Canadian ice hockey player (1948–2021)

- Born: April 6, 1948 Simcoe, Ontario, Canada
- Died: October 8, 2021 (aged 73) Brandon, Florida, U.S.
- Height: 6 ft 0 in (183 cm)
- Weight: 190 lb (86 kg; 13 st 8 lb)
- Position: Defence
- Played for: Springfield Kings (AHL); Toledo Blades (IHL)
- NHL draft: 7th overall, 1968; Los Angeles Kings
- Playing career: 1968–1971

Jim McInally (April 6, 1948 – October 8, 2021) was a professional ice hockey defenceman. He was drafted in the first round, 7th overall by the Los Angeles Kings in the 1968 NHL Amateur Draft. He never played in the National Hockey League. McInally was born in Simcoe, Ontario.

== Career statistics ==
			Regular season					Playoffs
Season	Team	League	GP	G	A	Pts	PIM	GP	G	A	Pts	PIM
1966-67	Hamilton Red Wings	OHA	48	0	3	3	54
1967-68	Hamilton Red Wings	OHA	53	2	17	19	32
1968-69	Springfield Kings	AHL	47	0	8	8	34	—	—	—	—	—
1969-70	Nashville Dixie Flyers	EHL	30	5	10	15	60	—	—	—	—	—
1969-70	Toledo Blades	IHL	10	0	1	1	26	—	—	—	—	—
1970-71	Nashville/Jacksonville/Jersey	EHL	46	7	19	26	72

Preceded by Rick Pagnutti	Los Angeles Kings first-round draft pick 1968	Succeeded by Tim Young
