= 1966 NHL amateur draft =

1966 North American ice hockey draft

General information
- Date: April 25, 1966
- Location: Mount Royal Hotel; Montreal, Quebec, Canada

Overview
- 24 total selections in 4 rounds
- First selection: (Canada) Barry Gibbs (Boston Bruins)
- Hall of Famers: 1: D Brad Park

The 1966 NHL amateur draft was the fourth draft for the National Hockey League. It was held at the Mount Royal Hotel in Montreal on the off-day between games one and two of the 1966 Stanley Cup Final.

This draft is notable for being the first in which the majority of the players selected (19 of 24 picks) came from top-tier junior teams which would, in the succeeding years, reorganize into Major Junior Hockey in Canada. Perhaps anticipating these changes, and looking to make the draft more competitive in advance of the 1967 NHL expansion, league president Clarence Campbell announced a plan eight months later to restructure rookie contracts and phase out direct sponsorship of junior hockey teams by NHL clubs.

The last active player in the NHL from this draft class was Brad Park, who played his last NHL game in the 1984–85 season.

== Selections by round ==
Listed below are the selections in the 1966 NHL amateur draft.

| = NHL All-Star team · | = NHL All-Star (Note: Players are identified as an All-Star if they were selected for the All-Star game at any time in their career.) · | = Hall of Famers |

=== Round one ===
| # | Player | Nationality | NHL team | College/junior/club team |
|---|---|---|---|---|
| 1 | Barry Gibbs (D) | Canada | Boston Bruins | Estevan Bruins (SJHL) |
| 2 | Brad Park (D) | Canada | New York Rangers | Toronto Marlboros (OHA) |
| 3 | Terry Caffery (C) | Canada | Chicago Black Hawks | Toronto Marlboros (OHA) |
| 4 | John Wright (C) | Canada | Toronto Maple Leafs | West Clair Gaels (OHA) |
| 5 | Phil Myre (G) | Canada | Montreal Canadiens | Shawinigan Bruins (QJHL) |
| 6 | Steve Atkinson (RW) | Canada | Detroit Red Wings | Niagara Falls Flyers (OHA) |

=== Round two ===
| # | Player | Nationality | NHL team | College/junior/club team |
|---|---|---|---|---|
| 7 | Rick Smith (D) | Canada | Boston Bruins | Hamilton Red Wings (OHA) |
| 8 | Joey Johnston (LW) | Canada | New York Rangers | Peterborough Petes (OHA) |
| 9 | Ron Dussiaume (LW) | Canada | Chicago Black Hawks | Oshawa Generals (OHA) |
| 10 | Cam Crosby (LW) | Canada | Toronto Maple Leafs | Toronto Marlboros (OHA) |
| 11 | Maurice St. Jacques (C) | Canada | Montreal Canadiens | London Nationals (OHA) |
| 12 | Jim Whittaker (D) | Canada | Detroit Red Wings | Oshawa Generals (OHA) |

=== Round three ===
| # | Player | Nationality | NHL team | College/junior/club team |
|---|---|---|---|---|
| 13 | Garnet Bailey (LW) | Canada | Boston Bruins | Edmonton Oil Kings (AJHL) |
| 14 | Don Luce (C) | Canada | New York Rangers | Kitchener Rangers (OHA) |
| 15 | Larry Gibbons (D) | Canada | Chicago Black Hawks | Markham Waxers (OHA) |
| 16 | Rick Ley (D) | Canada | Toronto Maple Leafs | Niagara Falls Flyers (OHA) |
| 17 | Jude Drouin (C) | Canada | Montreal Canadiens | Verdun Maple Leafs (QJHL) |
| 18 | Lee Carpenter (D) | Canada | Detroit Red Wings | Hamilton Red Wings (OHA |

=== Round four ===
| # | Player | Nationality | NHL team | College/junior/club team |
|---|---|---|---|---|
| 19 | Tom Webster (RW) | Canada | Boston Bruins | Niagara Falls Flyers (OHA) |
| 20 | Jack Egers (RW) | Canada | New York Rangers | Kitchener Greenshirts (OHA) |
| 21 | Brian Morenz (LW) | Canada | Chicago Black Hawks | Oshawa Generals (OHA) |
| 22 | Dale MacLeish (C) | Canada | Toronto Maple Leafs | Peterborough Petes (OHA) |
| 23 | Bob Pate (D) | Canada | Montreal Canadiens | Montreal Junior Canadiens (OHA) |
| 24 | Grant Cole (G) | Canada | Detroit Red Wings | St. Michael's Buzzers (OHA) |

| = NHL All-Star team · | = NHL All-Star · | = Hall of Famers |

== See also ==
- 1966–67 NHL season
- List of NHL players
