= Barry Gibbs =

Canadian ice hockey player (born 1948)

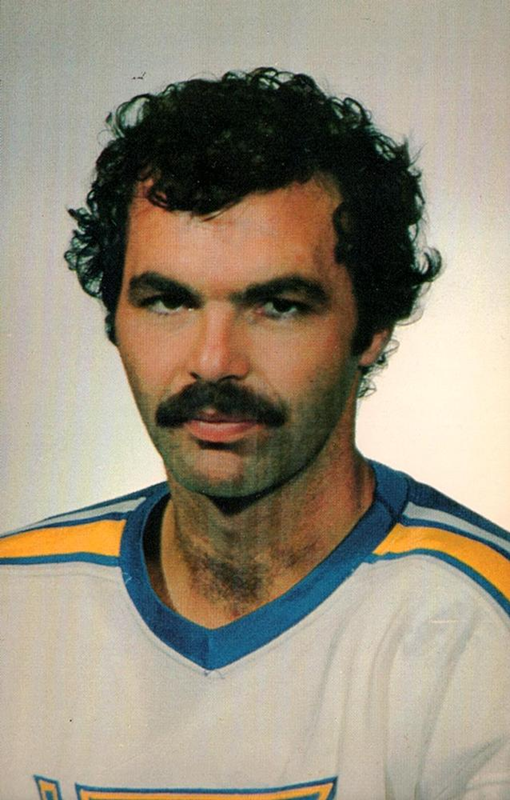
- Gibbs in 1978 postcard for St. Louis Blues
- Born: September 28, 1948 (age 77) Lloydminster, Saskatchewan, Canada
- Height: 5 ft 11 in (180 cm)
- Weight: 195 lb (88 kg; 13 st 13 lb)
- Position: Defence
- Shot: Right
- Played for: Boston Bruins; Minnesota North Stars; Atlanta Flames; St. Louis Blues; Los Angeles Kings
- NHL draft: 1st overall, 1966; Boston Bruins
- Playing career: 1967–1980

Barry Paul "Gibby" Gibbs (born September 28, 1948) is a Canadian former professional ice hockey defenceman. He was selected first overall in the 1966 NHL Amateur Draft.

== Playing career ==
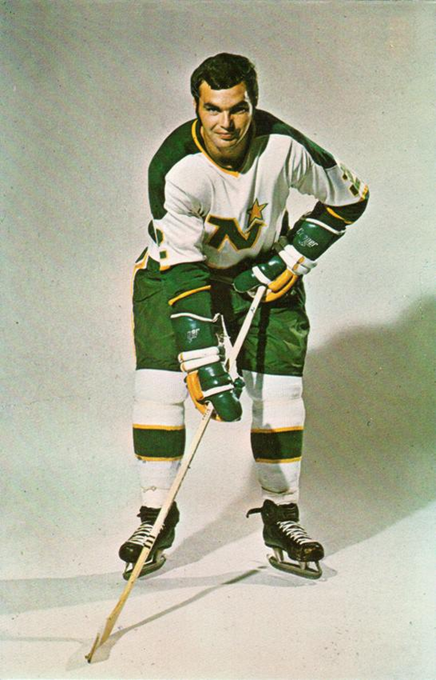
1970 card of Gibbs for Minnesota North Stars

During his NHL career, Gibbs played for the Boston Bruins, Minnesota North Stars, Atlanta Flames, St. Louis Blues and Los Angeles Kings. He retired in 1981.

Gibbs came to Minnesota from Boston in the deal that brought Tom Williams to the North Stars. He played junior hockey at Estevan, Sask. and in the Boston organization at Oklahoma City of the CHL. He comes from a family of seven, four boys and three girls. His nephew, Darren Gibbs, has worked as an on-ice official in the National Hockey League since 1997.

On the final weekend of the 1969-70 season, Gibbs scored the only goal in Minnesota's 1-0 victory over the Philadelphia Flyers on April 4. The goal came on an 80-foot shot that somehow eluded Flyers' goalie Bernie Parent. The loss eliminated the Flyers from playoff contention. He was traded along with Phil Myre and Curt Bennett from the Flames to the Blues for Bob MacMillan, Dick Redmond, Yves Bélanger and a second-round selection in the 1979 NHL entry draft (23rd overall–Mike Perovich) on December 12, 1977.

== Career statistics ==
			Regular season					Playoffs
Season	Team	League	GP	G	A	Pts	PIM	GP	G	A	Pts	PIM
1964–65	Estevan Bruins	SJHL	51	3	4	7	56	6	0	1	1	6
1965–66	Estevan Bruins	SJHL	59	3	23	26	45	12	0	2	2	14
1965–66	Estevan Bruins	M-Cup	—	—	—	—	—	13	1	0	1	14
1966–67	Estevan Bruins	CMJHL	56	10	32	42	81	13	2	2	4	21
1967–68	Boston Bruins	NHL	16	0	0	0	2	—	—	—	—	—
1967–68	Oklahoma City Blazers	CPHL	41	7	16	23	154	7	1	2	3	24
1968–69	Boston Bruins	NHL	8	0	0	0	2	—	—	—	—	—
1968–69	Oklahoma City Blazers	CHL	55	3	25	28	194	12	0	4	4	53
1969–70	Minnesota North Stars	NHL	56	3	13	16	182	6	1	0	1	7
1970–71	Minnesota North Stars	NHL	68	5	15	20	132	12	0	1	1	47
1971–72	Minnesota North Stars	NHL	75	4	20	24	128	7	1	1	2	9
1972–73	Minnesota North Stars	NHL	63	10	24	34	54	5	1	0	1	0
1973–74	Minnesota North Stars	NHL	76	9	29	38	82	—	—	—	—	—
1974–75	Minnesota North Stars	NHL	37	4	20	24	22	—	—	—	—	—
1974–75	Atlanta Flames	NHL	39	3	13	16	39	—	—	—	—	—
1975–76	Atlanta Flames	NHL	76	8	21	29	92	2	1	0	1	2
1976–77	Atlanta Flames	NHL	66	1	16	17	63	3	0	0	0	2
1977–78	Atlanta Flames	NHL	27	1	5	6	24	—	—	—	—	—
1977–78	St. Louis Blues	NHL	51	6	12	18	45	—	—	—	—	—
1978–79	St. Louis Blues	NHL	76	2	27	29	46	—	—	—	—	—
1979–80	Los Angeles Kings	NHL	63	2	9	11	32	1	0	0	0	0
1980–81	Houston Apollos	CHL	33	1	6	7	43	—	—	—	—	—
1980–81	Oklahoma City Stars	CHL	17	0	3	3	16	3	0	1	1	9
NHL totals			797	58	224	282	945	36	4	2	6	67

== Awards ==
- CMJHL First All-Star Team – 1967

Preceded by André Veilleux	NHL first overall draft pick 1966	Succeeded by Rick Pagnutti
Preceded by Joseph Bailey	Boston Bruins first-round draft pick 1966	Succeeded by Steve Atkinson
Preceded by Red Berenson	St. Louis Blues captain 1978–79	Succeeded by Brian Sutter
