= 1967 NHL amateur draft =

1967 North American ice hockey draft

General information
- Date: June 7, 1967
- Location: Queen Elizabeth Hotel; Montreal, Quebec, Canada

Overview
- 18 total selections in 3 rounds
- First selection: (Canada) Rick Pagnutti (Los Angeles Kings)

The 1967 NHL amateur draft was the fifth draft for the National Hockey League. It was held June 7, 1967, the day after the 1967 expansion draft, at the Queen Elizabeth Hotel in Montreal.

The last active player in the NHL from this draft class was Serge Bernier, who played his last NHL game in the 1980–81 season.

== Selections by round ==
Listed below are the selections in the 1967 NHL amateur draft.

=== Round one ===
#	Player	Nationality	NHL team	College/junior/club team
1	Rick Pagnutti (D)	Canada	Los Angeles Kings	Garson-Falconbridge Native Sons (NOJHL)
2	Steve Rexe (G)	Canada	Pittsburgh Penguins	Belleville Mohawks (OHA Sr. A)
3	Ken Hicks (F)	Canada	California Seals	Brandon Wheat Kings (MJHL)
4	Wayne Cheesman (D)	Canada	Minnesota North Stars	Whitby Dunlops (MetJHL)
5	Serge Bernier (RW)	Canada	Philadelphia Flyers	Sorel Black Hawks (QJHL)
6	Bob Dickson (LW)	Canada	New York Rangers	Chatham Maroons (WOJBHL)
7	Bob Tombari (LW)	Canada	Chicago Black Hawks	Sault Ste. Marie Greyhounds (NOJHL)
8	Elgin McCann (RW)	Canada	Montreal Canadiens	Weyburn Red Wings (WCJHL)
9	Ron Barkwell (F)	Canada	Detroit Red Wings	Flin Flon Bombers (MJHL)
10	Meehan Bonnar (RW)	Canada	Boston Bruins	St. Thomas Stars (WOJBHL)

=== Round two ===
#	Player	Nationality	NHL team	College/junior/club team
11	Bob Smith (C)	Canada	Pittsburgh Penguins	Sault Ste. Marie Greyhounds (NOJHL)
12	Gary Wood (D)	United States/ Canada	California Seals	Fort Frances Royals (MJHL)
13	Larry Mick (RW)	Canada	Minnesota North Stars	Pembroke Lumber Kings (CJAHL)
14	Al Sarault (D)	Canada	Philadelphia Flyers	Pembroke Lumber Kings (CJAHL)
15	Brian Tosh (D)	Canada	New York Rangers	Smiths Falls Bears (CJAHL)
16	J. Bob Kelly (LW)	Canada	Toronto Maple Leafs	Port Arthur Marrs (TBJHL)
17	Al Karlander (C)	Canada	Detroit Red Wings	Michigan Tech Huskies (NCAA)

=== Round three ===
#	Player	Nationality	NHL team	College/junior/club team
18	Kevin Smith (D)	Canada	California Seals	Halifax Colonels (MVJBHL)

== See also ==
- 1967–68 NHL season
- 1967 NHL expansion draft
- List of NHL players
