= Steve Atkinson =

Canadian ice hockey player (1948–2003)

- Born: October 16, 1948 Toronto, Ontario, Canada
- Died: May 6, 2003 (aged 54) Niagara Falls, Ontario, Canada
- Height: 5 ft 11 in (180 cm)
- Weight: 170 lb (77 kg; 12 st 2 lb)
- Position: Right wing
- Shot: Right
- Played for: NHL; Boston Bruins; Buffalo Sabres; Washington Capitals; WHA; Toronto Toros
- NHL draft: 6th overall, 1966; Boston Bruins
- Playing career: 1968–1978

Steven John Atkinson (October 16, 1948 – May 6, 2003) was a Canadian ice hockey player who played the positions of centre and right wing. He played in both the National Hockey League and World Hockey Association from 1969 to 1976.

== Early life ==
Atkinson was born in Toronto, Ontario, but grew up in Barrie, Ontario. Guided by Hap Emms in Barrie, Emms brought Atkinson along with him when he moved the Flyers from Barrie to Niagara Falls. On April 26, 1968, he scored the winning goal in Game 8 to eliminate the Kitchener Rangers in the OHL Championship Series on the way to a Flyers Memorial Cup title. Atkinson had 19 goals in 29 playoff games that year.

== Career ==
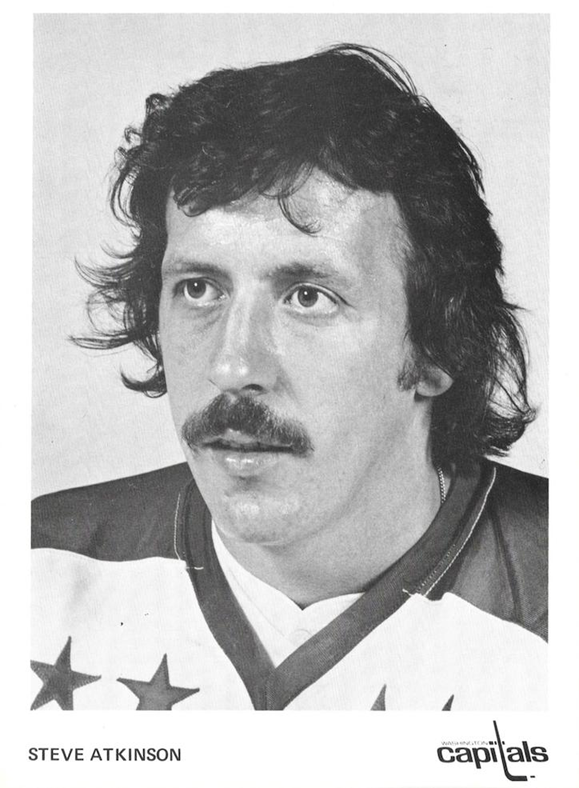
1974-75 headshot of Atkinson for Washington Capitals

Originally drafted in 1966 by the Boston Bruins, after the Bruins acquired the pick from the Detroit Red Wings in February 1966. In 1968-69 he joined the Bruins' affiliate the Oklahoma City Blazers of the Central Hockey League and scored 80 points in 65 games, winning rookie of the year.

Atkinson joined two expansion teams during his career. He was claimed by the Buffalo Sabres in the 1970 NHL Expansion Draft, and he spent four seasons with them. In the 1974 NHL Expansion Draft he was claimed by the Washington Capitals. During his only season with the Capitals, he became the first player in franchise history to score on a penalty shot on February 1, 1975, against the Vancouver Canucks. Atkinson also had a one-season stint with the Toronto Toros of the World Hockey Association.

== Personal ==
Atkinson died of a heart attack on May 6, 2003, at the age of 54.

== Career statistics ==
=== Regular season and playoffs ===
			Regular season					Playoffs
Season	Team	League	GP	G	A	Pts	PIM	GP	G	A	Pts	PIM
1964–65	Niagara Falls Flyers	OHA	15	1	0	1	0	—	—	—	—	—
1965–66	Niagara Falls Flyers	OHA	39	8	7	15	12	6	5	2	7	2
1966–67	Niagara Falls Flyers	OHA	44	31	35	66	42	10	6	5	11	4
1967–68	Niagara Falls Flyers	OHA	50	37	36	73	61	19	14	10	24	15
1968–69	Boston Bruins	NHL	1	0	0	0	0	—	—	—	—	—
1968–69	Oklahoma City Blazers	CHL	65	40	40	80	62	12	4	0	4	13
1969–70	Oklahoma City Blazers	CHL	63	29	23	52	63	—	—	—	—	—
1970–71	Buffalo Sabres	NHL	57	20	18	38	12	—	—	—	—	—
1971–72	Buffalo Sabres	NHL	67	14	10	24	26	—	—	—	—	—
1972–73	Buffalo Sabres	NHL	61	9	9	18	36	1	0	0	0	0
1973–74	Buffalo Sabres	NHL	70	6	10	16	22	—	—	—	—	—
1974–75	Richmond Robins	AHL	22	11	18	29	6	7	1	4	5	15
1974–75	Washington Capitals	NHL	46	11	4	15	8	—	—	—	—	—
1975–76	Toronto Toros	WHA	52	2	6	8	22	—	—	—	—	—
1975–76	Buffalo Norsemen	NAHL	37	30	31	61	38	—	—	—	—	—
1976–77	Erie Blades	NAHL	28	18	20	38	19	—	—	—	—	—
1976–77	Brantford Alexanders	OHA Sr	11	9	13	22	6	—	—	—	—	—
1977–78	Brantford Alexanders	OHA Sr	33	15	28	43	4	—	—	—	—	—
WHA totals			52	2	6	8	22	—	—	—	—	—
NHL totals			302	50	51	111	104	1	0	0	0	0

Preceded by Barry Gibbs	Boston Bruins first-round draft pick 1966	Succeeded by Meehan Bonnar
