= Tuukka Pulliainen =

Finnish ice hockey player

- Born: 25 August 1984 (age 41) Turku, Finland
- Height: 5 ft 11 in (180 cm)
- Weight: 196 lb (89 kg; 14 st 0 lb)
- Position: Centre
- Shot: Left
- Played for: TUTO Hockey; TPS; Jokipojat; Lausitzer Füchse; HPK; HC '05 Banská Bystrica
- NHL draft: 248th overall, 2002; Los Angeles Kings
- Playing career: 2002–2017

Tuukka Pulliainen (born 25 August 1984) is a Finnish former professional ice hockey forward who played for TPS and HPK in the Liiga. He also had periods abroad in Slovakia and Germany. Pulliainen ended his active career in 2017 after five consecutive seasons with Finnish second-tier team TuTo. He was drafted 248th overall in the 2002 NHL entry draft by the Los Angeles Kings.

== Career statistics ==
=== Regular season and playoffs ===
			Regular season					Playoffs
Season	Team	League	GP	G	A	Pts	PIM	GP	G	A	Pts	PIM
1999–2000	TUTO Hockey	FIN U16	14	9	17	26	28	3	1	2	3	27
1999–2000	TUTO Hockey	FIN.2 U20	1	0	0	0	0	1	0	0	0	0
1999–2000	TUTO Hockey	FIN.2	1	0	0	0	0	—	—	—	—	—
2000–01	TUTO Hockey	FIN.2 U18	2	1	0	1	0	—	—	—	—	—
2000–01	TUTO Hockey	FIN U20	37	3	11	14	8	—	—	—	—	—
2001–02	TUTO Hockey	FIN U20	3	0	2	2	0	—	—	—	—	—
2001–02	TUTO Hockey	Mestis	41	11	8	19	8	—	—	—	—	—
2002–03	TUTO Hockey	FIN.2 U20	2	5	0	5	0	—	—	—	—	—
2002–03	TUTO Hockey	Mestis	42	15	17	32	12	—	—	—	—	—
2003–04	TPS	FIN U20	1	0	0	0	0	—	—	—	—	—
2003–04	TPS	SM-liiga	2	0	0	0	0	—	—	—	—	—
2003–04	Suomi U20	Mestis	4	1	2	3	0	—	—	—	—	—
2003–04	TUTO Hockey	Mestis	38	5	21	26	10	—	—	—	—	—
2004–05	TPS	FIN U20	4	2	2	4	0	—	—	—	—	—
2004–05	Jokipojat	Mestis	12	4	4	8	4	—	—	—	—	—
2004–05	TUTO Hockey	Mestis	29	4	11	15	6	6	1	1	2	0
2005–06	TPS	SM-liiga	56	6	5	11	16	2	0	0	0	4
2006–07	TPS	SM-liiga	46	1	1	2	6	1	0	0	0	0
2007–08	Lausitzer Füchse	GER.2	52	10	34	44	36	—	—	—	—	—
2008–09	TUTO Hockey	Mestis	43	13	34	47	32	10	1	8	9	8
2009–10	TUTO Hockey	Mestis	45	15	41	56	14	4	1	5	6	10
2010–11	HPK	SM-liiga	50	3	14	17	16	2	0	0	0	6
2011–12	HPK	SM-liiga	41	2	3	5	45	—	—	—	—	—
2011–12	HC ’05 Banská Bystrica	SVK	10	2	1	3	4	5	1	1	2	2
2012–13	TUTO Hockey	Mestis	44	10	32	42	20	11	3	7	10	6
2013–14	TUTO Hockey	Mestis	46	16	36	52	46	13	2	13	15	8
2014–15	TUTO Hockey	Mestis	35	12	32	44	16	14	1	8	9	2
2015–16	TUTO Hockey	Mestis	20	1	11	12	16	7	1	5	6	2
2016–17	TUTO Hockey	Mestis	44	5	31	36	12	11	2	7	9	4
SM-liiga totals			195	12	23	35	83	5	0	0	0	10
Mestis totals			443	112	280	392	196	76	12	54	66	40

=== International ===
Year	Team	Event	GP	G	A	Pts	PIM
2002	Finland	WJC18	8	2	6	8	8
Junior totals			8	2	6	8	8
